= Dress of the Year =

Annual fashion award

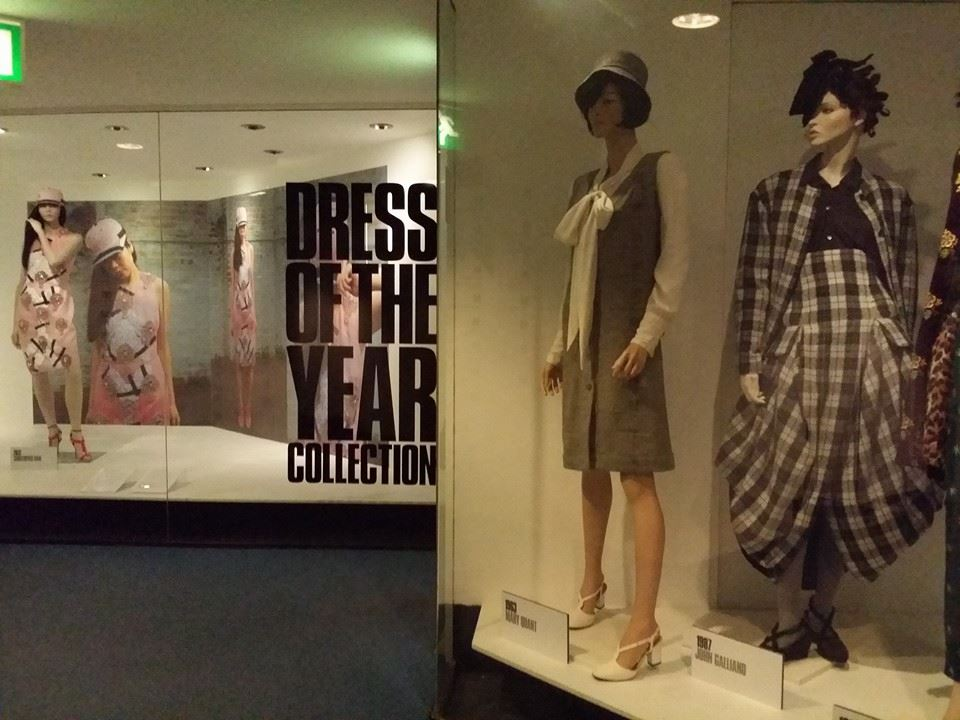
Dress of the Year exhibit at the Fashion Museum, Bath. From left to right, outfits by Christopher Kane (2013), Mary Quant (1963), and John Galliano (1987).

The Dress of the Year is an annual fashion award run by the Fashion Museum, Bath since 1963. Each year since 1963, the Museum has asked a fashion journalist to select a dress or outfit that best represents the most important new ideas in contemporary fashion. For 2010 the Museum broke with tradition by asking the milliner Stephen Jones, rather than a journalist, to choose an outfit; and again in 2014 when the fashion blogger, Susanna Lau of Style Bubble, was asked to choose an outfit for 2013. The outfit is then donated to the Fashion Museum along with an Adel Rootstein mannequin to represent that year's total look.

== Selections in chronological order ==
Year	Designer(s)	Brief description	Selected by:	Associated publication
1963	Mary Quant Reed Crawford (hat) Anello & Davide (boots)	Grey wool 'Rex Harrison' pinafore dress & cream blouse.	Members of The Fashion Writers' Association	
1964	Jean Muir for Jane & Jane Charles Jourdan for Dior (shoes)	Dress in printed Liberty silk.	Members of The Fashion Writers' Association	
1965	John Bates for Jean Varon Anello & Davide (shoes)	Printed linen dress with mesh midriff.	Members of The Fashion Writers' Association	
1966	Michèle Rosier of V de V (coat) Young Jaeger (dress) Simone Mirman (hat) Elliott (boots) John Bates for Echo (tights)	Clear plastic raincoat and boots worn with black & white rayon linen dress, white tights and white hat with red plastic visor.	Ernestine Carter	The Sunday Times
1967	David Bond for Slimma Edward Mann (hat) Saxone (shoes)	Woman's trouser suit, hat & blouse in striped cotton.	Felicity Green	The Daily Mirror
1968	Jean Muir Bally (shoes)	Black-spotted white cotton voile dress.	Ailsa Garland	Fashion
1969	Ossie Clark for Quorum Rayne (shoes)	Woman's silk chiffon and satin trouser suit in Celia Birtwell print.	Prudence Glynn	The Times
1970	Bill Gibb for Baccarat Kaffe Fassett (knitwear) The Chelsea Cobbler (boots)	Plaid wool skirt and blue and white blouse, knitted waistcoat, blue suede boots.	Beatrix Miller	British Vogue
1971	Female: Graziella Fontana for Judith Hornby Ravel (sandals) Male: Rupert Lycett Green for Blades	Female: Hot pants suit in checked Liberty cotton. Male: Black velvet evening suit & boots.	Serena Sinclair and Patrick Lichfield	The Daily Telegraph
1972	Teenage girl:Biba Young girl: Bobby Hillson Young boy: Orange Hand for Montague Burton	Teenage girl: Dress, hat & boots, red & white spotted cotton. Young girl: Checked cotton dress & pinafore. Young boy: Trousers, jumper and tank top.	Moira Keenan	The Sunday Times
1973	Female: Marc Bohan for Christian Dior London Male: Yves Saint Laurent Rive Gauche	Female: White wool coat & hat. Male: Wool jacket, trousers & sweater.	Alison Adburgham	The Guardian
1974	Ottavio and Rosita Missoni Pasquali (shoes)	Male & female ensembles in knitted wool & rayon.	Jennifer Hocking	Harper's Bazaar and Queen
1975	Female: Gina Fratini Male: Tommy Nutter The Chelsea Cobbler (shoes)	Female: Wedding dress, veil & posy basket, cream silk organza with mimosa print. Male: Bridegroom's frock coat suit, eau de nil wool.	Anna Harvey	Brides
1976	Female: Kenzo Takada of Jungle Jap Male: Fiorucci	Female: Two printed cotton ensembles with wooden jewellery. Male: Hand-knitted sweater, two shirts and jeans.	Helena Matheopoulos	The Daily Express
1977	Kenzo Takada of Jungle Jap	Shirt-dress in khaki cotton, straw hat & plimsolls.	Ann Boyd	The Observer
1978	Female: Gordon Luke Clarke Male: Cerruti	Female: Printed cotton & polyester jersey tunic, skirt and trousers worn with black leather skirt and coat. Male: Coat, jacket, waistcoat & trousers, knitted wool and wool tweed.	Barbara Griggs	The Daily Mail
1979	Jean Muir Manolo Blahnik for Zapata (shoes)	Black rayon jersey dress & beret with black leather jacket.	Geraldine Ranson	The Sunday Telegraph
1980	Calvin Klein Diego della Valle (sandals)	Red & brown striped silk dress with leather belt & wooden jewellery.	Michael Roberts	The Sunday Times
1981	Karl Lagerfeld for Chloé Walter Steiger (shoes) Ugo Correani (necklace)	Printed white silk dress.	Vanessa de Lisle	Harper's & Queen
1982	Margaret Howell Nigel Preston of Maxfield Parrish (leather wear) Mulberry (belt) Manolo Blahnik for Zapata (shoes)	Two women's ensembles, a linen skirt, shirt and waistcoat and a blue suede and fawn chamois leather skirt & jacket with cotton shirt.	Grace Coddington	British Vogue
1983	Sheridan Barnett Manolo Blahnik (shoes)	Linen dress and coat.	Sally Brampton	The Observer
1984	Female: BodyMap Female: Betty Jackson Brian Bolger: (scarf) Male: Katharine Hamnett	Female: Ensemble comprising skirt, jumper, stockings, hat, waxed jacket & earrings (BodyMap). Female: Dress, cardigan & hat and scarf (Jackson & Bolger). Male: T-shirt, shirt and cotton trousers.	Brenda Polan	The Guardian
1985	Female: Bruce Oldfield Charles Jourdan (shoes) Maria Buck (jewellery) Male: Scott Crolla	Female: Black silk & gold lamé evening dress. Male: Shirt, crushed velvet trousers and ikat mules.	Suzy Menkes	The Times
1986	Giorgio Armani	Female: Checked wool jacket, skirt, and black suede shoes. Male: Jacket, trousers, shirt and brogues.	Colin McDowell	Country Life
1987	John Galliano Patrick Cox (shoes)	Checked cotton coat, skirt, shirt & hat.	Debbi Mason	Elle
1988	Jean-Paul Gaultier for Junior Gaultier	Black denim dress, mesh T-shirt, hat, tights & shoes.	Jeff Banks	The Clothes Show (BBC)
1989	Rifat Ozbek	Woman's embroidered velvet evening ensemble.	Kathryn Samuel	The Daily Telegraph
1990	Romeo Gigli	Woman's dark blue velvet trouser suit with organza blouse.	Joan Burstein	Browns
1991	Karl Lagerfeld for Chanel	Pink lurex & wool tweed jacket & shoes, denim skirt & hat, belt & costume jewellery.	Elizabeth Tilberis	Vogue
1992	Ralph Lauren	Woman's black and white pinstripe trouser suit & shirt.	Liz Smith	The Times
1993	Donna Karan	Purple wool & stretch velvet dress, hat & boots.	Glenda Bailey	Marie Claire
1994	John Galliano	Black silk strapless evening dress.	Meredith Etherington-Smith	Harper's & Queen
1995	Female: Catherine Rayner Emma Hope (shoes) Male: Tom Gilbey	Female: Beaded ivory silk satin wedding dress. Male: Ivory silk frock coat, cream wool trousers and embroidered waistcoat.	Sandra Boler	Brides
1996	Female: Alexander McQueen Male: Paul Smith	Female: Floral brocade top with red 'bumster' trousers. Male: Bright blue two-piece suit and shirt	Tamsin Blanchard	The Independent
1997	Female: Hussein Chalayan Female: Julien MacDonald Female: Lainey Keogh Female: Deborah Milner Philip Treacy (bonnet) Mr Pearl (corset) Shaun Leane (mouthpiece)	Female: Purple evening dress with sunburst bead embroidery (Chalayan). Female: 'Mermaid' evening dress, gold knitted rayon & horsehair (MacDonald). Female: Evening dress and coat, black knit with beading (Keogh). Female: Evening coat, purple velvet, with fur collar (Milner). Sculptural black bonnet Black satin corset Silver sculptural mouthpiece	Isabella Blow	The Sunday Times
1998	Female: Sonia Rykiel Male: Chris Bailey for Jigsaw Menswear	Female: Black knitted sweater & combat trousers, with pink marabou stole. Male: Silver-grey suit, white T-shirt and ankle-length puffa jacket.	Iain R. Webb	Elle
1999	Alexander McQueen	Cream lace dress with brown leather collar and sandals.	Susannah Frankel	The Independent
2000	Donatella Versace for Versace	Bamboo-print silk chiffon evening dress and jeweled mules.	Lisa Armstrong	The Times
2001	Tom Ford for Yves Saint Laurent Rive Gauche	'Peasant' ensemble of gauze top and velvet & satin skirt, with boots and velvet scarf.	Alexandra Shulman	Vogue
2002	Junya Watanabe	Dress, pieced together knit & jersey fabrics, with distressed cow-hide shoes.	Hilary Alexander	The Daily Telegraph
2003	Marni	Colorful printed dress.	Lucinda Chambers	Vogue
2004	Tom Ford for Yves Saint Laurent Rive Gauche	Evening dress in Chinese dragon print satin.	Sarajane Hoare	Vanity Fair
2005	Female: Alber Elbaz for Lanvin Male: Thom Browne	Female: Blue silk faille dress with full skirt. Male: Suit with covered buttons and seersucker lining.	Charlie Porter	GQ; The Guardian
2006	Prada	Woman's olive green coat with fur patch pockets.	Sarah Mower	
2007	Giles Deacon at GILES	Orange 'Troubadour' dress with accompanying orange scarf.	Hywel Davies	
2008	Karl Lagerfeld for Chanel (trouser ensemble) Kate Moss for Topshop (dress)	Gold star and navy blue trouser ensemble. Long sleeved black dress with heart-print.	Paula Reed	Grazia
2009	Antonio Berardi	White and black trompe l'oeil corset dress.	Lucy Yeomans	Harper's Bazaar
2010	Vivienne Westwood	Green ribbed shot-silk deconstructed dress.	Stephen Jones	
2011	Sarah Burton for Alexander McQueen	White embroidered ivory tulle and organza ballgown.	Hamish Bowles	Vogue
2012	Raf Simons for Christian Dior	Embroidered and appliquéd silk cut-off ballgown and black cigarette pants.	Vanessa Friedman	Financial Times
2013	Christopher Kane (dress) Nasir Mazhar (hat) Sophia Webster (shoes)	Sugar-pink silk organza dress trimmed with white lace, diamanté and black duct tape. Pink canvas cap with cartoon character motif. Pink and black sandals with striped stiletto heel.	Susanna Lau	Style Bubble
2014	Gareth Pugh	'Look 41' ensemble in plastic sheeting and calico.	Katie Grand	LOVE
2015	Craig Green	Two menswear/gender-neutral ensembles shown on male and female mannequins.	Gordon Richardson, design director of Topman.	
2016	Female: JW Anderson for LOEWE Male: JW Anderson	Female: Cream mohair tweed dress with gilded Nappa leather bustier, tan leather bag and wire and coin jewellery. Male: Cream oversized cardigan, trousers, white shirt and red trainer-boots. Perspex choker.	Kate Phelan	British Vogue
2017	Maria Grazia Chiuri for Christian Dior	"We Should All be Feminists" T-shirt.	Sarah Bailey	Red
2018	Female: Nicolas Ghesquière for Louis Vuitton Male: Kim Jones for Dior Homme	Female: Ensemble comprising an embroidered pink silk coat, white silk cropped long-sleeve blouse and blue jersey shorts, with 'Archlight' sneakers. Male: "Look 27," a pink cashmere double-breasted suit, canvas and calfskin duffle bag, pink calfskin and mesh sneakers, and chunky metal and rhodonite necklace.	Alexander Fury	Another Magazine and Financial Times
2019	Giambattista Valli for H&M	Evening dress in pink pleated tulle.	Donna Wallace	British Vogue
2020	Female: Riccardo Tisci for Burberry & PPE Neutral: Ian Jeffries for Marine GARMENT Neutral: Black Lives Matter T-shirt Male: Francesco Colucci Female: Daisy Robbins for Daisy Sunshine Female: Gareth Wrighton & Ib Kamara Female: Iain R. Webb Documentary film: Nick Knight	Female: "Apocalypse Outfit" as worn by Naomi Campbell: Burberry cashmere cape with Tyvek overall; latex gloves, face mask. Neutral: Gender-neutral khaki T-shirt and trousers with fishing cap, mask, and cotton bag inscribed "BLACK LIVES MATTER". Neutral: Unisex T-shirt with Black Lives Matter slogan. Male: Ensemble from Colucci's "Isolation Portraits" series, assembled from an orange down jacket, PVC trousers, a jumpsuit and a sculptural mask. Female: Patchwork cotton and cashmere kimono, embroidered sweater and painted cotton shorts. Female: "A Dress of Hope" designed by Wrighton & styled by Kamara, using found table linens. Female: Dress from Iain R. Webb's graduate collection of 1980. Documentary film: "SWALK", about John Galliano at Martin Margiela.	Iain R. Webb	
2021	Armani	Black silk georgette dress with lotus flower embroidery.	Ib Kamara and Gareth Wrighton	Dazed
2022	Miuccia Prada for Miu Miu	Brown cotton twill micro-miniskirt, blue slashed cotton shirt and grey cashmere cable knit cropped sweater.	Kenya Hunt	Elle
2023	Simone Rocha and Bianca Saunders	pink and green silk, tulle and sequin gown by Simone Rocha, and printed cotton menswear outfit by Bianca Saunders	Caroline Rush, Chief Executive of the British Fashion Council	
2024	Male: Sabato De Sarno for Gucci Female: Jun Takahashi for UNDERCOVER	Casual menswear ensemble of short shorts and blue cotton shirt; woman's jumpsuit with trompe l'oeil jeans.	Tim Blanks	

== See also ==
- List of fashion awards
