= Christopher Kane =

Scottish fashion designer

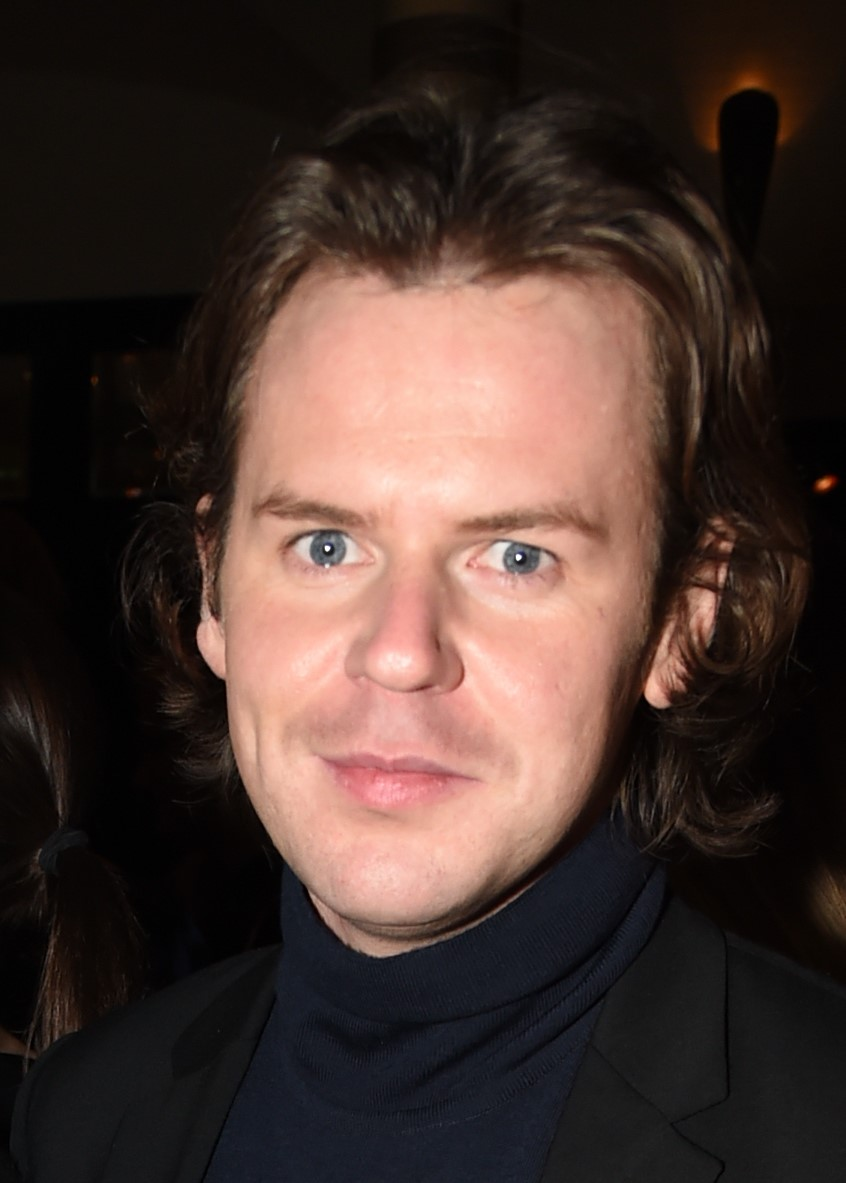
- Christopher Kane in 2014
- Born: Christopher John Kane; 26 July 1982 (age 44); Newarthill, North Lanarkshire, Scotland
- Education: Central Saint Martins College of Art and Design
- Label: Christopher Kane
- Awards: New British Designer of the year 2006, Scottish New Designer of the year 2006

Christopher John Kane (born 26 July 1982) is a Scottish fashion designer based in London.

== Biography ==
Kane was born as the youngest of five children in Newarthill, North Lanarkshire, to an engineer and draughtsman father and housewife mother.

Kane attended Taylor High School. While still in college, he worked for fellow designers Russell Sage and Giles Deacon and attracted the attention of Donatella Versace by winning the Lancôme Colour Award in 2005.

Kane subsequently won the Harrods Design Award for his MA Graduate collection, consisting of £1,500 and a showpiece window in Harrods from 24 February to 8 March 2006. The collection consisted of stretch-lace dresses decorated with brass rings. He was immediately hired by Versace to work on the label's Atelier couture collection as well as consulting on shoes and accessories. He graduated from Central Saint Martins College of Art and Design in 2006.

In December 2006, Kane was photographed by David Bailey for British Vogue alongside Antony Price, whose 1980s bombshell evening dresses and curvaceous feminine styles foreshadowed Kane's bandage-tight tailoring. In August 2014, Kane was one of 200 public figures who were signatories to a letter to The Guardian opposing Scottish independence in the run-up to September's 2014 Scottish independence referendum.

== Career ==
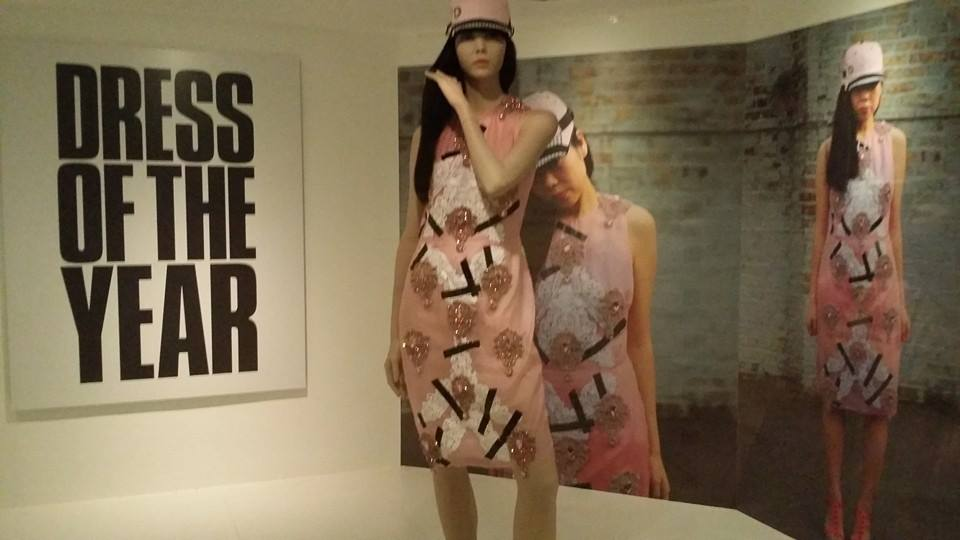
Christopher Kane dress chosen by Susanna Lau to represent 2013 in the Fashion Museum, Bath's Dress of the Year collection.

Kane established his namesake label in 2006, with his sister Tammy Kane who studied at the Scottish College of Textile Design, running the financial side of the business and also assisting in his fabric creation and design process. His first independent show, presented on 20 September 2006, consisted of super-short bandage dresses in neon shades. Kane said of his collection that he "only used neon last year because it was my first collection and I wanted to go as bright as possible." The collection was lauded by prominent international fashion critics and credited by various sources as a major contributor to summer 2007's 'fluoro' trends.

In 2006, the designer launched a capsule collection for British high-street clothing store Topshop.

His second collection, showcased on 13 February 2007, once again received positive reviews from leading critics. Moving away from his signature tight-fitted look, Kane showcased a collection of velvets and leathers in a more relaxed silhouette. This was also his first collaboration with prominent shoe designer Manolo Blahnik, who created the shoes for the show.

Kane collaborations extend into music: He designed costumes for Kylie Minogue's music video "2 Hearts"; On 18 October 2007, he collaborated with Beth Ditto for luxury label Swarovski's Fashion Rocks show held at the Royal Albert Hall to critical acclaim. In addition to designing his own label and consulting at Versace, he is also part of Atlier Swarovski, a small collective of designers who create special jewelry collections for Swarovski.

On 10 September 2007, days before Kane was scheduled to show his third collection, it was reported that 23 pieces from the Spring-Summer 2008 show had been stolen from his London studio. In addition to cashmere and leather pieces, a laptop was also stolen. No fingerprints were found upon inspection. However, the designer proceeded his third show and second collaboration with Blahnik seven days later on 17 September 2007, once again changing directions and introducing snake skin printed chiffon and denim in yet another collection that won rave reviews.

Known to be a passionate promoter of his home country, the designer was appointed as an ambassador for VisitScotland in January 2008. He celebrated Burns Night by showcasing a special trunk show of his Spring-Summer 2008 collection as well as hosting an exclusive party at Harvey Nichols the ambassador for VisitScotland. Furthering his role, Kane collaborated with Lancôme to create a limited edition Juicy Tube lip gloss. The finished product, called Burns Night, is a tangerine colour with a beautiful illustration printed on the tube along with Kane's signature and was launched in February 2008.

On 12 February 2008, the designer presented his fourth collection which departed again from his previous themes. Featuring dresses of layered organdy and plastic sequins, cable woven cashmere tops and dresses along with heavily embellished jackets, the show was greeted with similar praise from fashion critics.

On 16 September 2008, Kane showcased his fifth collection, this time building upon his previous theme of circular sequins which "had grown into even bigger circles of chiffon and leather that rippled like scales around the models or created scalloped contours down their bodies to oscillating – and very short – hemlines." Inspired by "Planet of the Apes" and "The Flintstones", it was met with similar praise from fashion critics. Commercially, the collection was a massive success, selling out within 24 hours of launch on Net-A-Porter.com on 13 February 2009.

Kane presented his sixth collection on 21 February 2009, a show labelled as another "Best Ever". The collection featured nude chiffon dresses and was praised for its construction as a more mature offering. He also collaborated with Versace, producing a capsule collection of accessories for the younger Versus (Versace) line showcased on 2 March 2009. Donatella Versace later compared him to her late brother Gianni Versace.

In 2009 and 2010, he collaborated with the professional British haircare brand Catwalk by TIGI to create an advertising campaign for the brand's three new product collections.

On 15 January 2013, Kering and Kane jointly announced that they have signed an agreement by which Kering acquired 51% of the designer's luxury brand, in order to develop the business in partnership with its creator. Kering plans to open Kane’s first freestanding boutique.

In 2018, Phoebe Tonkin wore a red dress from 2018 collection of Christopher Kane. In 2019, Kering sold its 51% ownership of the Christopher Kane brand back to its founder.

A pink dress by Kane trimmed with lace and gaffer tape was selected by the blogger Susanna Lau to represent 2013 in the Fashion Museum, Bath's Dress of the Year collection. It was accessorized with a Nasir Mazhar hat and shoes by Sophia Webster.

In 2023 it was reported that the brand had appointed insolvency firm FTS Recovery to help secure an investor to refinance its debt or buy out the business.

In 2024, Kane designed a capsule collection for London-based fashion label Self-Portrait.

In 2026, British brand Mulberry announced Kane as their new creative director His debut collection was shown at London Fashion Week on September 20th, 2026, in Mulberry's first catwalk show since 2017.

== Awards ==
In April 2006, Kane was awarded the Young Designer of the Year at the Scottish Fashion Awards.

On 27 November 2007, he was awarded New Designer of The Year at the British Fashion Awards.

On 2 December 2013, Kane was awarded the Women’s Wear Designer of the Year award at the 2013 British Fashion Awards at the London Coliseum.
