= Sophia Webster =

British shoe and accessories designer (born 1985)

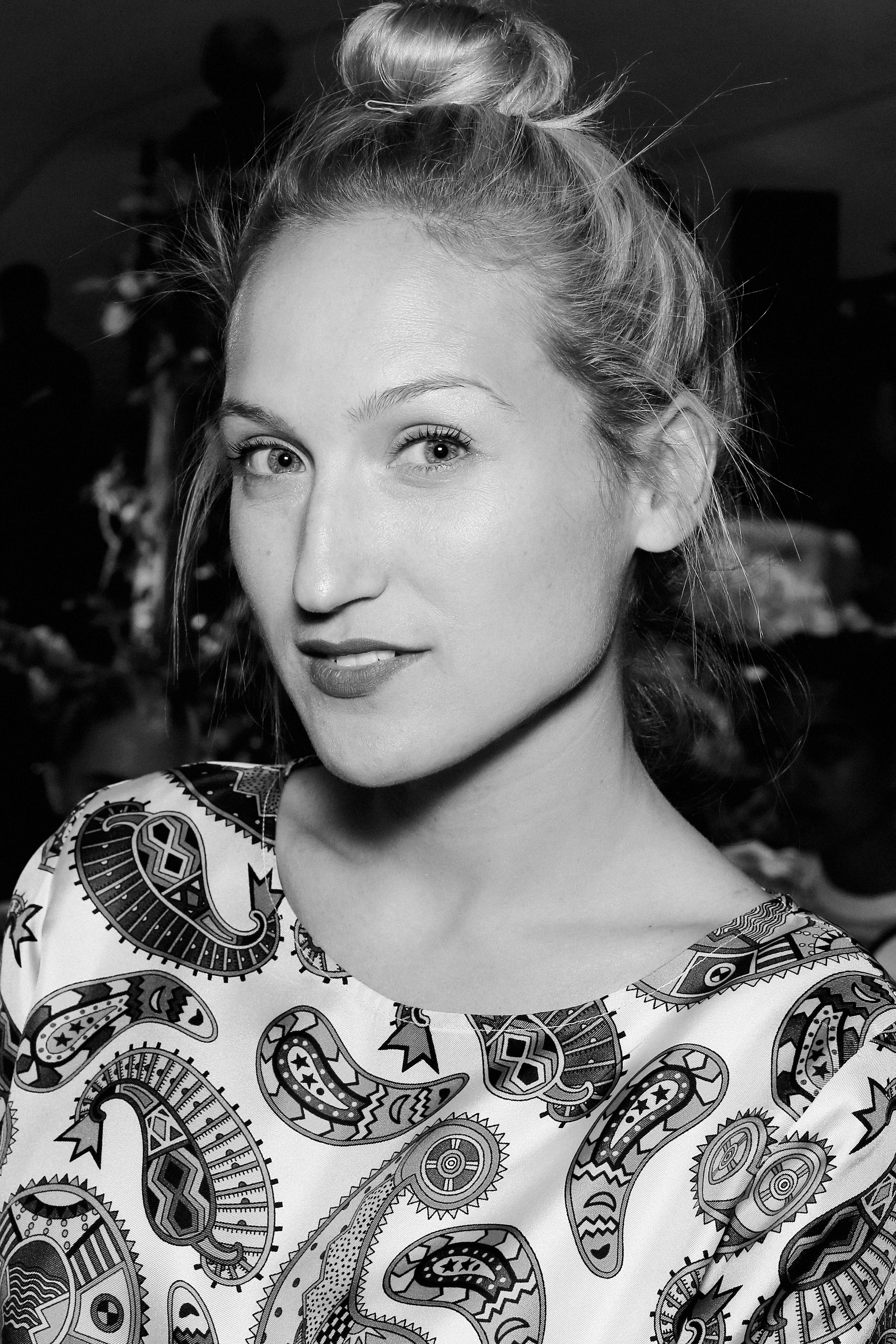
- Sophia Webster
- Born: 18 March 1985 (age 40); South Africa
- Education: London College of Fashion
- Label: Sophia Webster

Sophia Grace Webster (born 18 March 1985) is a British shoe and accessories designer who launched her eponymous footwear line in September 2012. She is renowned for a feminine, bold yet playful design approach which has led to distribution at over 200 retailers worldwide.

As a teenager, Webster was a competitive dancer. She attended The Rochester Grammar School before going on to study art and sculpture at Camberwell College of Arts in London. Realising she wanted to create shoes, Webster went on to Cordwainers' College at the London College of Fashion, and then studied for her MA at Royal College of Art. Afterwards she worked as an apprentice with Nicholas Kirkwood before setting out on her own. Footwear News named Webster the "Emerging Footwear Designer of the Year" of 2013, and she also appeared on The Times 2013 New Power List as someone to watch. In 2014, Marie Claire named Webster as one of 7 designers who represented the future of British fashion.

In 2013, Sophia Webster was awarded the British Fashion Award for Emerging Accessories Designer.

Webster's shoes were selected as part of the Dress of the Year ensemble for 2013 at the Fashion Museum, Bath. Chosen by the fashion blogger Susanna Lau, the pink-and-black sandals with stiletto heels accompanied a Christopher Kane dress and hat by Nasir Mazhar.

In June 2015 Webster's Riri shoe went on display at the Victoria & Albert Museum as part of their 'Shoes: Pleasure and Pain' exhibition.

In March 2016, Sophia Webster was the recipient of the BFC Vogue Fashion Fund award. The fund helps support emerging British designers with financial support as well as mentoring from industry experts. In May later that year she opened her first official store on Mount Street Mews in Mayfair. As of September 2016, Sophia Webster products were available through over 200 retailers around the world. In June 2018, Sophia Webster opened her second boutique in Chelsea, London.
