= Susanna Lau =

Chinese-British journalist and blogger

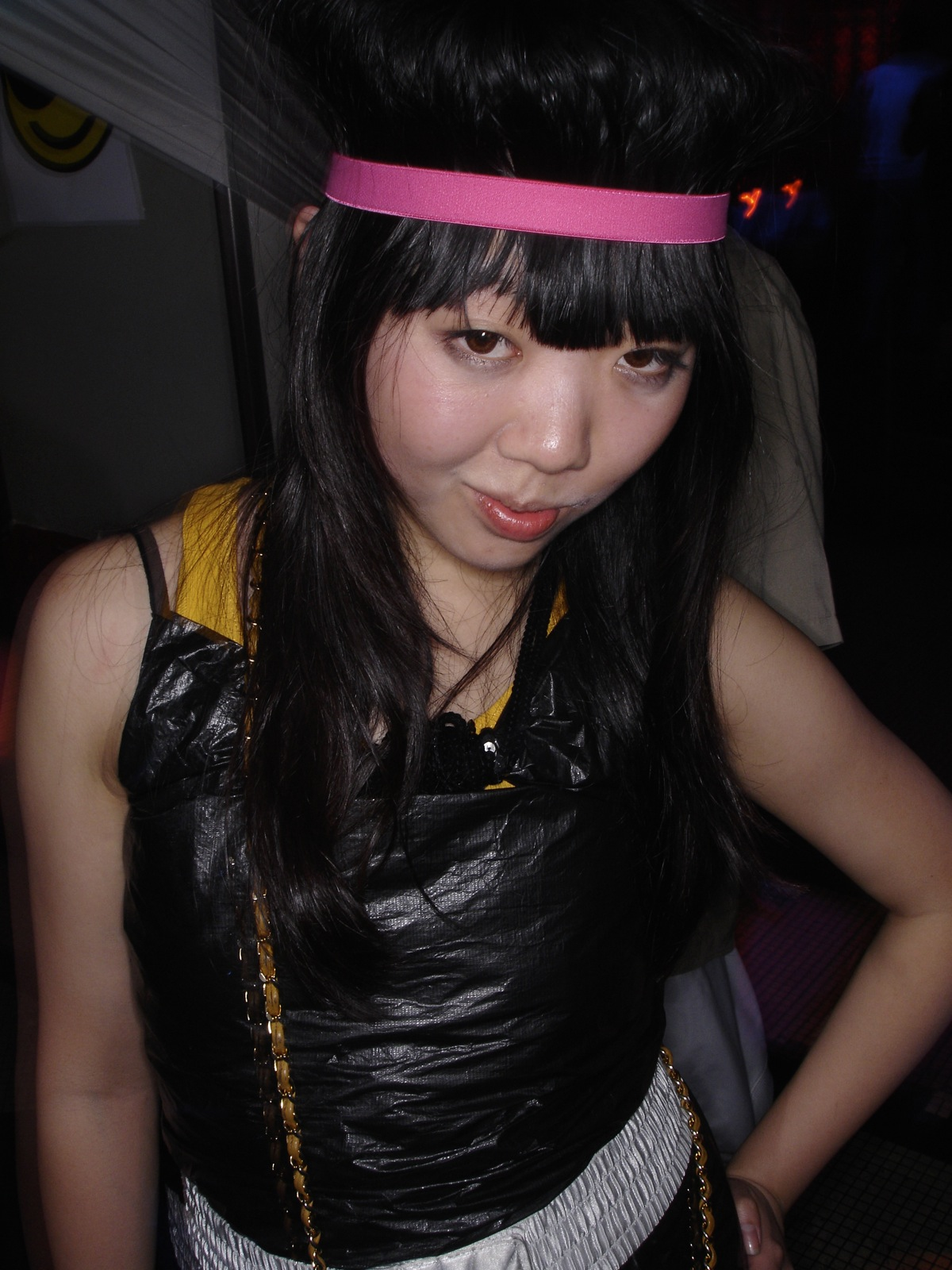
- Lau in 2007
- Born: Susanna Wing-Shi Lau; 1983 (age 42–43)
- Other names: Susie Bubble; Susie Lau
- Education: University College London
- Occupations: Journalist; blogger
- Years active: 2006–present
- Children: 2
- Website: stylebubble.co.uk

Susanna Wing-Shi Lau (born 1983) (known as Susie Bubble) is a British journalist and blogger. She got her start as a fashion blogger.

== Early life and education ==
Lau was born to a Hong Kong family and grew up in Camden Town, North London above her parents' takeaway shop before the family moved out to Finchley. Lau attended the Henrietta Barnett School. She went on to study history at University College London.

== Career ==
=== Style Bubble ===
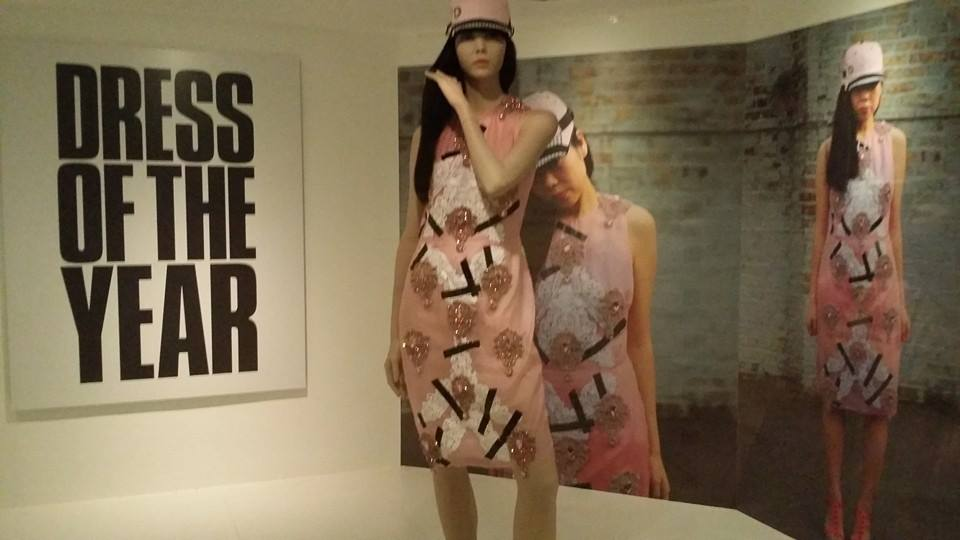
Christopher Kane dress chosen by Lau to represent 2013 in the Fashion Museum, Bath's Dress of the Year collection.

In March 2006, Lau got her start as a fashion blogger via her blog, Style Bubble. By 2010, it was attracting tens of thousands of daily visitors, with 300,000 unique users per month.

In March 2010 Lau left her role as commissioning editor of DazedDigital.com in order to focus on blogging full-time. Lau also has a Twitter account, which made 69th place in The Independent's 2012 Twitter 100 List, where she was called "the self-made queen of independent UK fashion blogging," and was noted as having over 151,000 followers. By 2013, this had increased to 214,000.

Followers of Style Bubble included the fashion designers Christopher Kane and Nanette Lepore, who told the New York Times in 2010 that Style Bubble showed a "fun approach that is at the same time realistic," and that she and her staff were regular readers.

Through Style Bubble, Lau became an occasional consultant and freelance writer, stating in January 2011 that 65 per cent of her income came from special projects, such as work for Gap, Dr. Martens, Armani, and the department store Selfridges; the rest from advertising revenue and freelance writing. For the Gap advertising campaign in 2010, she was one of the "demi-celebrities" who gave quotes while modelling their clothing, describing style as "the wrapping paper of my life". She was also involved in the launch of Google's Boutiques.com site, where alongside other celebrities, she was invited to set up her own online boutique on the site.

Lau has also gained notoriety for her unique home decor and living style.

In 2012, Lau collaborated on a book with journalist William Oliver called Style Feed: The World's Top Fashion Blogs, where they curated top fashion blogs.

In 2014 Lau was the first blogger (rather than a journalist) to be asked by the Fashion Museum, Bath to select an outfit to reflect 2013 for their Dress of the Year collection. Her choice was a pink dress by the 2013 Designer of the Year, Christopher Kane trimmed with lace and gaffer tape, with a hat by Nasir Mazhar and pink and black shoes by Sophia Webster.

=== Post-Style Bubble ===
Lau currently works as a freelance journalist and posts regularly on Instagram. She covers international fashion weeks including New York Fashion Week, London Fashion Week, Paris Fashion Week, and fashion events in China like Shanghai Fashion Week.

== Personal life ==
Lau lives in London.

== Works and publications ==
- Oliver, William; Bubble, Susie (2012). Style Feed: The World's Top Fashion Blogs. Munich: Prestel. ISBN 978-3-791-34718-9. OCLC 1086220206.

=== Selected articles ===
- Lau, Susie (25 October 2011). "The enduring appeal of trainers". The Guardian.
- Lau, Susie (20 November 2011). "Coming round to the idea of polka dots". The Guardian.
- Lau, Susie (18 December 2011). "Party frocks are failing us". The Guardian.
- Lau, Susie (8 February 2016). "Monkey business: how fashion is cashing in on Chinese new year". The Guardian.
- Lau, Susie (15 September 2017). "Breastfeeding on the front row: a beginner's guide". The Guardian.
- Lau, Susie (2 October 2018). "Saint Laurent's Dreams of the Orient: 'When you know a culture, you can't make mistakes'". The Guardian.
