= Vanessa de Lisle =

British fashion journalist

Vanessa de Lisle is a British fashion journalist. She was fashion editor for Harpers & Queen for 12 years, and then worked for British Vogue.

As a representative of Harpers & Queen, she was the fashion journalist asked to choose the Dress of the Year for 1981, for which she picked a printed silk dress by Karl Lagerfeld at Chloé, with shoes by Walter Steiger and a chunky necklace by Ugo Correani.

In 1996, de Lisle was a consultant on fashion for the House of Fraser chain. As of the 2010s, she is working as a stylist and fashion consultant.
