= Ernestine Carter =

British journalist (1906–1983)

Ernestine Carter OBE
- Carter in 1974
- Born: Ernestine Marie Fantl; 10 October 1906; Savannah, Georgia, US
- Died: 1 August 1983 (aged 76); Chelsea, London, UK
- Education: Wellesley College
- Occupations: Museum curator, journalist, fashion editor
- Known for: Editor/Associate Editor of The Sunday Times; Fashion editor of Harpers Bazaar; Newspaper columnist The Observer; Design Exhibition Britain Can Make It
- Spouse: John Waynflete Carter

Ernestine Marie Carter OBE (née Fantl; 10 October 1906 – 1 August 1983) was an American-born British museum curator, journalist, and fashion writer. She became hugely influential in her roles as women's editor, and later associate editor of The Sunday Times.

Her obituary described her as not only influencing British taste, but also putting her authority behind emerging fashion talent, becoming: "not only the acknowledged leader among women's fashion writers but also created a reputation for British fashion at a time when this country was considered a desert". In particular, she was instrumental in adding her authority to bolster the growing reputation of designers such as Mary Quant, Jean Muir, Gina Fratini and John Bates.

== Early life and career ==
Ernestine Marie Fantl was born on 10 October 1906 in Savannah, Georgia, US, where she was brought up. She studied modern and contemporary art and design at Wellesley College, Massachusetts, from which she graduated in 1927. She started out as a curatorial assistant at the newly formed Museum of Modern Art (MoMA), New York City in 1932, and held the title Curator between 1935 and 1937. As Ernestine M. Fantl, she curated these exhibitions at MOMA:

- 1935: Contemporary Architecture in California
- 1935: The Recent Work of Le Corbusier
- 1936: Posters by Cassandre
- 1936: Cubism and Abstract Art
- 1936: Architecture in Government Housing
- 1936: Exposition Architecture
- 1937: Modern Architecture in England

In 1936 she married a British antiquarian book dealer, John Waynflete Carter (1905–1975), and the Carters eventually moved to London.

== Wartime: 1939–1945 ==
During the Second World War Carter was employed by the British Ministry of Information. She worked on exhibitions and edited a book of photographs by Lee Miller titled Grim Glory: Pictures of Britain Under Fire (published London, 1941). The book, which included a foreword by Edward R. Murrow, went into five printings. Later in the war, Carter went to work for the U.S. office of war information in London.

== Post-war: 1946–1955 ==
Carter worked on the important design exhibition Britain Can Make It, organised by the Council of Industrial Design and held at the Victoria and Albert Museum in 1946. That same year she became fashion editor for Harper's Bazaar. Her first trip to Paris for the magazine was to report on Christian Dior's landmark New Look collection, launched 12 February 1947. From 1952 to 1954, she wrote her first newspaper column, a cookery section for The Observer, during which time she published a cookbook called Flash In The Pan (1953).

== Later career: 1955–1972 ==
In 1955, Carter began editing the women's page of The Sunday Times. She became well known for the high standard of her journalism and writing, and eventually became associate editor of the paper in 1968. Carter's editorial team, including Moira Keenan, was credited with having changed the face of fashion reporting in newspapers, presenting articles that emphasised excellence of design at all price levels. Carter encouraged the emergence of London as a major centre of fashion in the 1960s. Her intelligent prose and high standards led to her being recognised as an authoritative figure in the world of fashion. At a time when widespread intellectual snobbery led to the dismissal of fashion as a subject not worthy of serious consideration, Carter argued that fashion was "surely no more frivolous than architecture, to which it is closely related".

In 1962, Carter was appointed to the National Council for Diplomas in Art and Design, a post awarded by the Minister of Education. She was appointed an OBE in 1964. In the same year, she became a fellow of the Royal Society of Arts.

In 1966, she was the first individual fashion journalist to be invited to select an outfit for the Dress Of The Year, for which she chose a futuristic PVC and linen ensemble by Michèle Rosier, Young Jaeger and Simone Mirman. Two years later, she was appointed associate editor of The Sunday Times, a role she held until her retirement from the paper in 1972.

=== Retirement and death ===
After her retirement in 1972, Ernestine Carter wrote several books on fashion history (see Bibliography section). She died on 1 August 1983 at her home in Chelsea, London.

== Legacy ==
The Fashion Museum, Bath holds an important archive of more than 2000 fashion photographs from The Sunday Times during Carter's tenure there. This is known both as the Ernestine Carter Collection and as The Sunday Times Fashion Archive. The Fashion Museum and the Victoria and Albert Museum both own garments from Carter's wardrobe.

== Bibliography ==
=== Cookery ===
- Flash In The Pan (1953)

=== Fashion history ===
- 20th Century Fashion: a Scrapbook (1975)
- The Changing World of Fashion (1977)
- Magic Names of Fashion (1980)

=== Autobiography ===
- With Tongue in Chic (1974)
