= Tamsin Blanchard =

English fashion journalist, author, and lecturer

Tamsin Blanchard is a English fashion journalist, author, and lecturer. She is particularly known for her work on sustainability and ecological issues in fashion.

== Early life and education ==
Blanchard was born in Liverpool and took a fashion journalism course at Central Saint Martins.

== Journalism ==
In 1998, Blanchard started up a biannual fashion and visual arts magazine titled IT, for which she was publisher and co-editor. She was also at The Independent as a fashion editor, and from 1999 to 2005 was Style Editor at The Observer. She then joined The Daily Telegraph as style director for their magazine.

The Fashion Museum, Bath, chose Blanchard as the fashion journalist to select the most defining looks of 1996 for their Dress of the Year collection. She picked out an Alexander McQueen tunic and 'bumster' trousers from his "Hunger" collection for the womenswear look, and a man's Paul Smith electric blue two-piece suit and shirt. At the press launch, the clothes were modelled by Jimmy Pursey and his then partner Tizer Bailey, the model who had originally worn the McQueen ensemble in the designer's catwalk presentation. Blanchard said at the time that McQueen, who had recently succeeded John Galliano as the designer for Givenchy, was one of the strongest representations of mid-nineties "cutting-edge style," whilst Smith's suit represented the revolution in menswear where the male consumer was increasingly aware of labels and design.

Blanchard is also a fashion correspondent for the Victoria and Albert Museum's magazine and a contributing editor to 10 Magazine. She has also contributed to Vogue, Marie Claire, Harper's Bazaar and Rubbish.

Blanchard has been invited to teach fashion journalism at the University of Westminster and Central Saint Martins.

== Author ==
Blanchard's best-known book is probably Green is the New Black: How to Change the World with Style, published in 2007 and dealing with ecological awareness in a fashion-conscious lifestyle. TreeHugger reviewed the book favourably, noting that while Blanchard was not as authoritative on eco-issues as Lucy Siegle, she had still written a well-informed, fair-handed book that wrote accessibly about how to be both fashion-conscious and environmentally aware, and the EcoSalon website listed it as among their top 15 books on eco-fashion. The book established Blanchard as an authority on the subject of eco-consciousness in fashion, leading to her being approached for commentary on the topic.

=== Selected bibliography ===
- Graham, Tim; Blanchard, Tamsin (1998). Dressing Diana. Welcome Rain Publishers. ISBN 9781566492935.
- Blanchard, Tamsin (1999). Antonio Berardi: Sex and Sensibility. Watson-Guptill. ISBN 9780823012077.
- Blanchard, Tamsin (2000). The Shoe: Best Foot Forward. Carlton Books, Limited. ISBN 9781847329660.
- Blanchard, Tamsin (2004). Love Your Home. Conran Octopus. ISBN 9781840913743.
- Blanchard, Tamsin (2007). Green is the New Black: How to Save the World in Style. Hodder & Stoughton. ISBN 9781444719710.
- Blanchard, Tamsin (2019). 100 Styles, 100 Women. Laurence King Publishing. ISBN 9781786274854.

== Personal life ==
Blanchard lives in London with her partner and their children.
