= Cuban heel =

Cuban heel may refer to:

- Stocking with a heel made with folded over and sewn reinforcement
- High-heeled footwear

== See also ==
- Beatle boots
