= Ib Kamara =

Sierra Leonean fashion journalist and stylist

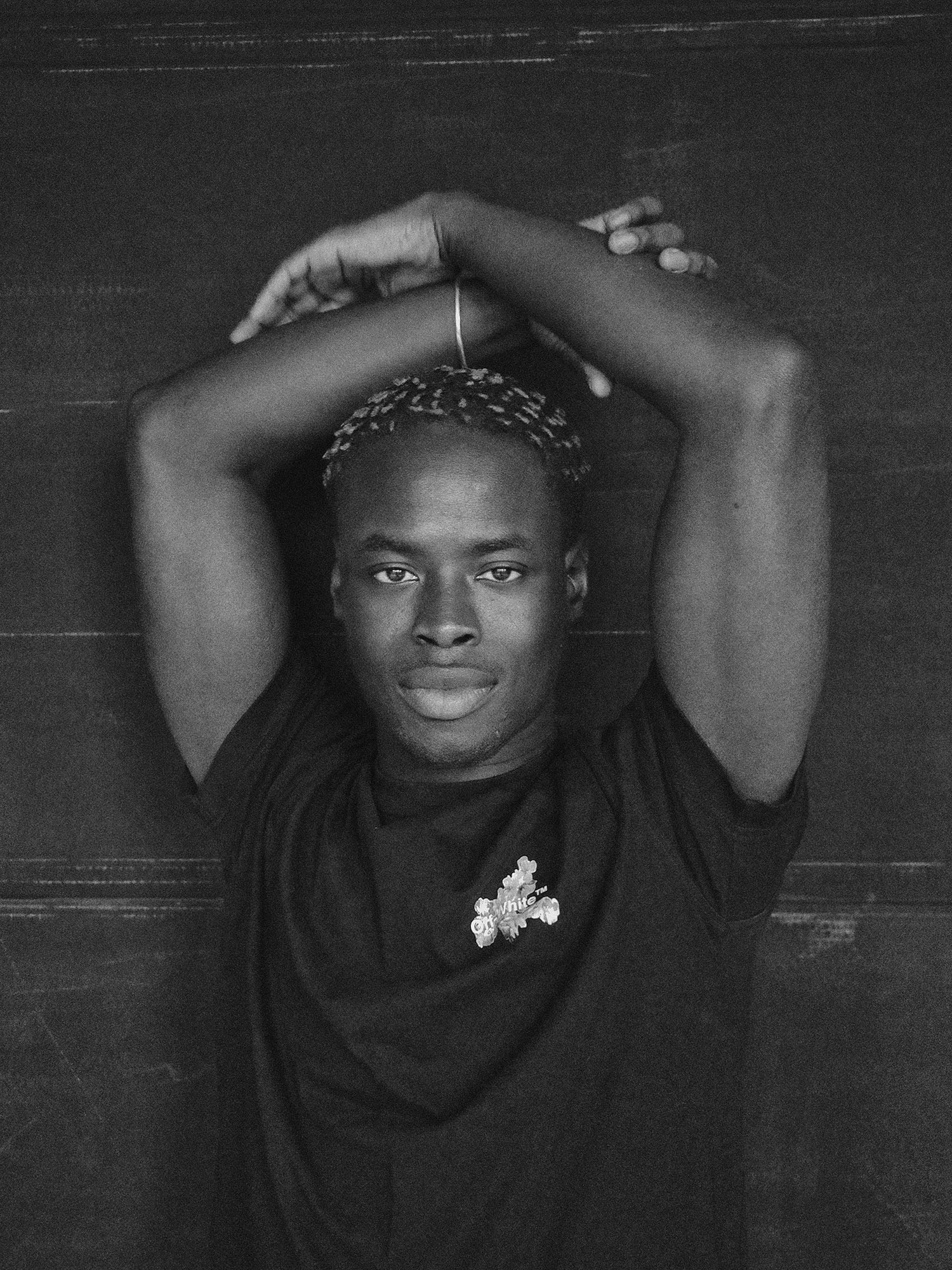
Kamara in 2024

IB Kamara, pronounced I.B. (born 1990) is a Sierra Leone-born, London-based stylist, journalist, musician, model and creative director. In January 2021, he was named editor-in-chief of Dazed magazine and in 2024 was announced as creative director for Off-White following the death of Virgil Abloh in November 2021.

== Early life and education ==
Born Ibrahim Kamara in Sierra Leone in 1990, Kamara and his parents took refuge with relatives in The Gambia after civil war broke out, before settling in London when Kamara was sixteen years old.

Kamara attributes his turbulent early years and growing up watching world affairs develop via CNN and BBC news programmes with inspiring his focus on current affairs. Before coming to London, he spent three years studying sciences with the intention of becoming a doctor, but ultimately decided to pursue fashion as a career option. After enrolling on an art & design course at Westminster Kingsway College, Kamara studied fashion and communication at Central Saint Martins.

== Career ==
=== Fashion ===
Kamara's approach is based upon gender identity, fluidity and exploration, queerness and also upon Blackness and African identity and beauty. He attributes his early studies of science with helping him develop his focus and attention to detail. While he originally thought he might become a designer, Kamara became an assistant to the stylist Barry Kamen which established his early career as a stylist. His inspirations include the composer Hans Zimmer, the film director Quentin Tarantino and the American fashion journalist Diana Vreeland, who Kamara admires for their ability to create instantly identifiable worlds.

Kamara was first noticed in 2016 when he curated an exhibition in London titled "2026" which focused upon Black African masculinity. The models, recruited off the street of Soweto, dressed in outfits made using second-hand clothing, and photographed by Kristin-Lee Moolman, helped Kamara address and challenge conventional ideas of race, gender and sexuality in fashion while also aiming to suggest what menswear would look like a decade later. The exhibition was shown at Somerset House, which led to him being introduced by Jamie Morgan to Robbie Spencer of Dazed who gave Kamara his first fashion editorial.

As a stylist, Kamara was popular with the late Virgil Abloh of Louis Vuitton menswear and Off-White, and also styled catwalks and advertising campaigns for Riccardo Tisci of Burberry and Erdem. Other clients include Chanel, Stella McCartney, Dior, Kenneth Ize and Lorenzo Serafini. Comme des Garçons invited him to design hats for their show, and H&M signed him up to direct their first circularly-designed (zero-waste) collection. He worked with Rihanna, both for her label Fenty, and as her personal stylist when she was featured on the cover of Dazed. Abloh described Kamara as a prime example of how "diversity can bring out the best of the fashion industry". For his work as a stylist, Kamara was awarded the Isabella Blow Award by the British Fashion Council on 29 November 2021. Following the passing of Virgil Abloh, Kamara was appointed Art & Image Director for Off-White on 30 April 2022.

In 2021, Iain R. Webb was asked by the Fashion Museum, Bath to choose garments representing 2020 for their Dress of the Year collection. Among the outfits he chose to represent 2020 was a unique dress called "A Dress of Hope", designed by Dazed's art director, Gareth Wrighton and styled by Kamara out of vintage table-linens and doilies collected by Webb.

=== Journalism ===
Kamara worked as a senior editor-at-large for i-D magazine from 2019 to 2021, and has also worked for Vogue British Vogue, Vogue Italia, System, and W. In January 2021 he became editor in chief for Dazed.

His first issue of Dazed celebrated the National Health Service and people working together for change, and Kamara's aim is for the magazine to be globally relevant to readers from a wide range of backgrounds and cultures. When he received the Isabella Blow award in 2021, he said he was proud to be a beneficiary of the WWD awards' new focus on individual change-makers rather than companies and brands. As part of his approach to running Dazed, Kamara tries to secure contributors from all around the world, especially from underrepresented fashion centres such as those in Africa and the Middle East.

In addition to having their collaborative design chosen as a look for 2020, Kamara and Wrighton were the journalists chosen by the Fashion Museum, Bath to select the Dress of the Year for 2021. They chose the Armani wrap dress worn by Meghan, Duchess of Sussex for her and her husband's interview with Oprah Winfrey. Kamara and Wrighton argued that because Oprah with Meghan and Harry became an "iconic" and "definitive anti-establishment moment" that would endure in the British collective memory, it made sense to consider the dress worn by the pregnant Duchess as part of this story.
