= Anello & Davide =

British footwear company

- Type: Private
- Industry: Performance footwear
- Founded: 1922; 104 years ago in London
- Founders: Anello and Davide Gandolfi
- Headquarters: London
- Area served: Worldwide
- Products: Dance shoes, boots, custom shoes
- Website: www.handmadeshoes.co.uk

Anello & Davide (founded 1922) is a footwear company based in Covent Garden, London. It specialises in ballet shoes and theatrical footwear as well as making high quality fashion footwear for men and women. They are perhaps best known as the shoemakers responsible for the Beatle boot. The shop is seen briefly in the opening shot of the 1953 film Street of Shadows.

== Company history ==
Anello & Davide was founded in 1922 by Anello and Davide Gandolfi. They supplied bespoke dance shoes to London theatres and went on to provide shoes for films from the 1930s onwards. From the 1960s onwards the performance footwear that Anello & Davide sold became fashionable street wear. One particularly successful woman's style was the tap-dancer's shoe with a bar strap and ribbon bows. These shoes were able to be easily customised by the wearer. It was a mark of recognition for Anello & Davide's footwear when two of their designs were selected to complete two of the first three Dress Of The Year ensembles. They provided black leather kinky boots to accompany a Mary Quant ensemble in 1963, and a pair of shoes for a John Bates dress in 1965.

=== Notable clients ===
Beatle boots originated at Anello & Davide in the early 1960s. When the Beatles first saw Chelsea boots with Cuban heels worn by a London band playing in Hamburg they were told where they were purchased from. They visited and purchased their own and they later commissioned their own variation. This modified version of a Chelsea boot is now known as a Beatles boot. After their visits to the shop they realised that they could commission any variety of clothes or shoes by simply requesting or providing specific material.

Anello & Davide footwear is frequently mentioned in passing in theatrical memoirs and biographies of the mid-20th century London scene. The Beatle boots had a particular mystique, with Mark Feld (later Marc Bolan) purchasing his first pair from Anello & Davide after a London-wide search for the perfect footwear to complete his Mod outfit. Barbara Orbison, the widow of the singer Roy Orbison, remembered how when she met her future husband in 1968, his boots were always made by Anello & Davide.

In addition to the Beatles, Anello & Davide list Marilyn Monroe, Peter Ustinov, Orson Welles, Margaret Rutherford, Jane Fonda and David Niven as having been amongst their celebrity customers. They have also provided footwear to stage musicals such as Cats and Mamma Mia and to films including the Indiana Jones and Star Wars franchises.

Anello & Davide are occasionally credited as the shoemakers who made the ruby slippers worn by Judy Garland as Dorothy Gale in The Wizard of Oz. This is not the case, as surviving shoes for the 1939 film are clearly labelled as being from the Innes Shoe Company in Los Angeles. On their website, Anello & Davide simply state they have been "called upon to create unforgettable cinema icons—such as Dorothy's unforgettable red slippers form [sic] The Wizard of Oz." It is more probable that the firm provided the plain red leather shoes with Louis heels that were customised for the 1985 film Return To Oz, or at the very least, made replicas for stage productions.

=== Production ===
It takes an average of six months to make each pair of custom shoes using a cast of the client's foot. On 15 February 2009 Anello & Davide's warehouse in Park Royal was seriously damaged by fire, destroying their stock, machinery and their collection of celebrity foot casts. Among the casts lost were those of Queen Elizabeth II and Queen Elizabeth the Queen Mother.

In May 2004, Anello & Davide produced their first ready-to-wear shoe collection for men. They offered 25 contemporary/classic designs, including slip-on loafers and scooter boots.

=== Royal warrants granted ===
- 1997: Royal Warrant for the Queen Mother
- 2001: Royal Warrant for Her Majesty the Queen.
