= Katie Grand =

British stylist and fashion journalist (born 1971)

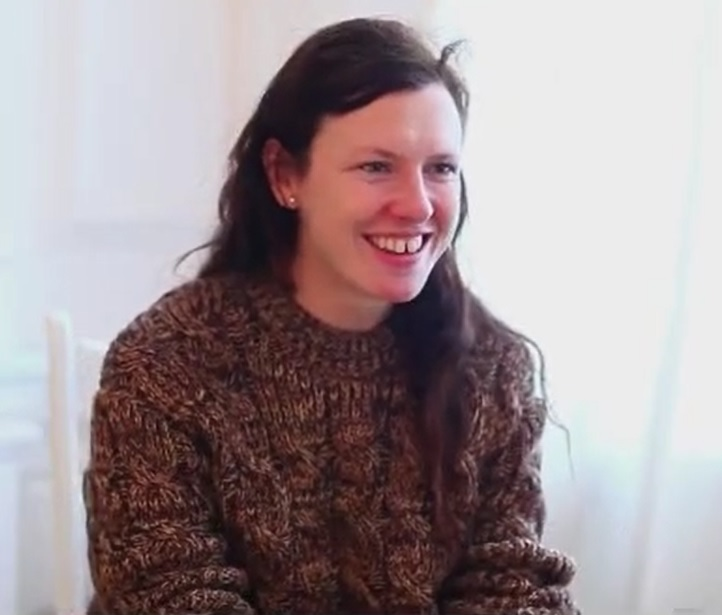
- Grand in 2010
- Born: April 1971 (age 55); Leeds, England
- Occupations: stylist and fashion journalist
- Years active: 1991–present
- Spouse: Steve Mackey (m. 2009; died 2023)

Katie Grand (born April 1971) is a British stylist, creative director and fashion journalist. She founded the fashion magazine LOVE in 2009, followed by fashion bible and creative agency Perfect in 2020.

== Early life and education ==
Katie Grand was born in Leeds, England, April 1971 and grew up in Selly Oak, Birmingham. She discovered fashion aged 12, saying:

I was really nerdy. And then, kind of overnight, I can clearly remember thinking, "I just want to be cool." Around that time, my dad's girlfriend moved up from London and I thought she was terribly chic. She always used to wear Warehouse, which had just opened and was really good, because Jeff Banks was still in charge. So there are photos of me aged twelve wearing waist-high tight red jeans with a puffed-sleeved blue sweater and awful hair, and then aged thirteen in an ankle-length black gathered skirt, white shirt tucked in, braces, a black tie, black lace tights, navy blue stilettos and a black beret with a veil. So it was quite quick! And I really got into going to London and going to the Great Gear Market and all that kind of thing.

At secondary school, she stated her strongest subjects were maths, history and English. On deciding her career, she said, "around fifteen I decided that I wanted to do something in art or fashion", so she began taking night classes at the local college in sculpture, life drawing, jewelry making and pottery to improve her design skills. After completing sixth form, Grand began a foundation course at Birmingham's Bournville College of Art, where she was named Student of the Year, achieving 96%.

Grand then moved on to Central Saint Martins College of Art and Design where she found it hard to settle on a single subject—"I tried design, marketing, journalism, knitwear... and ended up doing print, which I still find weird."

== Career ==
Named by British newspaper The Daily Telegraph as "one of the most powerful stylists in the world", Grand began fashion styling while still at St. Martins, directing and styling fashion shoots for newly launched magazine, Dazed & Confused in the 1990s. She was later bought by style magazine The Face as Fashion Director.

Soon after this, Grand was made Editor-in-Chief of POP, a biannual fashion magazine. This position brought Grand many friendships, including with celebrities Madonna and Agyness Deyn, and designers Stella McCartney, Luella Bartley, Miuccia Prada and Giles Deacon. She convinced actress Elizabeth Hurley to pose nude on the cover of POP, just six weeks after giving birth.

Grand is the former editor of LOVE, a bi-annual fashion magazine she launched herself in 2009. She left the publication in 2020. Grand styles many fashion photo shoots and shows including Giles and Unique at Topshop. She has also worked on fashion shows for Louis Vuitton and Prada. As editor of LOVE, she was the fashion journalist chosen to select 2014's Dress of the Year for the Fashion Museum, Bath.

Since leaving LOVE, Grand has launched her own successful independent magazine and creative agency “Perfect Magazine”.

== Personal life ==
Grand lives in Tufnell Park, North London. She was married to Pulp bassist Steve Mackey until his death in 2023. Grand has one step-son, born in 1996, who is Mackey’s son with longtime partner artist and former model Zoe Grace.

== Awards ==
In 2022, Grand won the Isabella Blow Award for Fashion Creator at the Fashion Awards.
