= Helena Matheopoulos =

Opera journalist

Helena Matheopoulos is a Greek-born, London-based journalist, author, biographer, public speaker and opera specialist. She has worked for a number of high-profile publications including Tatler, The Sunday Times, and Greek Vogue, as well as writing a number of books mainly on opera, but including a biography of Juan Carlos I of Spain. She has also worked in an advisory capacity for the Athens Megaron and the Philharmonia Orchestra and is often asked to speak publicly on opera and related subjects.

== Early life and education ==
Helena Matheopoulos was born in Athens. She went to PIERCE College in Athens, and gained her Bachelor's and master's degrees in Medieval History from University College London. She has mostly lived in London.

== Journalism ==
Mathepoulos became Fashion Editor at Tatler and after three years, moved to The Daily Express for two years. Whilst at the Express, she was the fashion journalist selected by the Fashion Museum, Bath to choose the defining looks of 1976 for their Dress of the Year collection. Declaring the mid-1970s as the "age of Jap," she chose two women's ensembles by Kenzō Takada for his influential label Jungle Jap, and a man's outfit by Fiorucci. She then moved on to The Evening News where she had a regular column for Arts-themed celebrity interviews. Matheopoulos also wrote for The Sunday Times, Gramophone and Opera Now, and between 1992-3, had a Saturday column in The Times magazine. She then became International Editor-at-Large for Greek Vogue.

== Books ==
Matheopoulos' first book, Maestro: Encounters with Conductors of Today was chosen as the Music Book of the Year 1983 by Stereo Review. Her second book, Bravo: Today's Tenors, Baritones and Basses Discuss their Roles, was also published in UK and US editions, and translated into various languages. The radio program Live from the Metropolitan Opera chose Bravo as a season prize for winners of their weekly interval quiz in 1986. British Book News reviewed Bravo as an "agreeable read," despite occasional moments of carelessness. Diva: Today's Sopranos and Mezzos Discuss their Art (1991) went into three hardback editions and two paperback editions in both the UK and the USA in its year of publication. In 1999, the sequel, Diva: The New Generation was reviewed by Classic CD as an example of Matheopoulos' consistently good interview-based writing. In 2011 she published Fashion Designers at the Opera, which The Austin Chronicle described as "deliriously lovely." A review in the New York Journal of Books described it as "scholarly yet highly entertaining."

Mathepoulos has also written two biographies, including a 1996 life of Juan Carlos I of Spain in collaboration with the King. Her second biography of the operatic tenor Plácido Domingo was released across eight countries.

== Public speaking and opera advising ==
Matheopoulos has regularly given public speeches on opera related subjects including Maria Callas; Don Giovanni; and Greek mythology in opera. Between 1991 and 1995, she worked for the Athens Megaron as their first Artistic Advisor. She then joined the Philharmonia Orchestra as a Special Advisor for Vocal Projects, before returning to the Athens Megaron as a Resident and Director of the Athens Residency. In 2005, she was made Artistic Administrator of Apollonian Enterprises, a musical event organisers which has set up events such as operatic concerts at the Teatro Dal Verme and Cadogan Hall.
