= Judy Hornby =

Model and fashion designer

Judy Hornby, also known as Judith Hornby, is a British-born American-based former model, fashion designer and boutique owner. In 1971 one of her ensembles, designed for her by Graziella Fontana, was chosen as the Dress of the Year. She then went on to become a successful American fashion designer.

== Career ==
Hornby was originally a model, before entering fashion design and retail. She commissioned samples and garments from freelance designers such as Graziella Fontana.The Fashion Museum (Bath) asked Serena Sinclair, who had been voted Fashion Writer of The Year in 1970, to choose the defining look for 1971 to add to their Dress of the Year collection. Sinclair selected one of Fontana's Liberty-print cotton hotpants ensembles for Hornby as her womenswear look, alongside a Blades man's suit.

As a designer, Hornby enjoyed mixing printed textiles, and in 1972, the unisex quality of some of her work was noted by The Baltimore Sun.

By 1975, due to export regulations, she had left the United Kingdom to live and work in the United States. She opened a small boutique with only one in-house seamstress on East 60th Street, Manhattan, called Hornby of Plenty, in September 1975, which was well received by buyers who had formerly had to travel to London to see her wholesale collections. Hornby of Plenty swiftly gained a good reputation due to its dedicated customer service and willingness to alter and even make new garments to fit clients at no extra cost, meaning that by December 1975, Hornby had to employ eight additional seamstresses to meet demand. In 1979, Hornby was selling her work to over 40 shops across the United States, and was described as a master of unexpected colour and pattern mixes which looked anything but haphazard. By the 1980s, she was considered a leading designer alongside Zandra Rhodes and Stephen Burrows. Women's Wear Daily reported in 1994 that Hornby had stepped in to take over the Chicago-based Becky Bisoulis brand after Bisoulis fell ill.

== Later life ==
By 2005, Hornby had moved to Connecticut and opened an antiques shop there, also offering antique-buying trips to France (where she owned an apartment in Aix-en-Provence) for American collectors. Her husband, Jerry Larrabure, is a vintage watch dealer.
