= Michèle Rosier =

French fashion designer (1929 - 2017)

- Born: 3 June 1929; Paris, France
- Died: 2 April 2017 (aged 87); Paris
- Mother: Hélène Gordon-Lazareff

Michèle Rosier (French: [miʃɛl lazaʁɛf ʁozje]; born Michèle Raudnitz, 3 June 1929 – 2 April 2017) was a French fashion journalist and designer who founded the V de V sportswear label. In addition to this, she worked as a film director and screenwriter since 1973.

== Early life and education ==
Born Michèle Raudnitz in 1929, her mother was the journalist Hélène Gordon (1909–1988). Michèle was the child from Hélène's first marriage to Jean-Paul Raudnitz.

Hélène's second marriage was to Pierre Lazareff (1907–1972). At age 10, Michèle was the first child to read The Little Prince by Antoine de Saint-Exupéry, a close friend of the family. She studied at the Nightingale-Bamford School in New York.

Her mother later founded Elle magazine in Paris.

== Journalism ==
Rosier started out as a journalist for her father's daily paper, France Soir before becoming chief editor of the magazine Le Nouveau Femina that took its name from the earlier French woman's magazine Femina launched in 1901 by Pierre Lafitte and discontinued in 1954.

== Fashion ==
In the early 1960s, Rosier founded V de V (which stands for Vêtements de Vacance, or 'Vacation Wear'). She also designed for at least two other lines: dresses for Chloe D'Alby, and a line of affordable furs called Monsieur Z which included pink and blue-dyed rabbit fur coats. However, her V de V designs, including both fashionable sportswear and activewear such as swimwear and ski-wear, were very successful. She was noted as an early adopter of vinyl and stretch fabrics, with one New York reporter commenting in 1965 on the close similarity between her two-colour jersey dresses and Yves Saint Laurent's subsequent Mondrian dresses. Due to her love of plastics, she was nicknamed the "Vinyl Girl," and has been credited with introducing vinyl to Paris fashion before André Courrèges, to whom she was compared by the International Herald Tribune for her "style without nostalgia." She was credited with being the first designer to use outsize industrial zippers deliberately. A contemporary press piece in 1968 ranked Rosier alongside Emmanuelle Khanh and Christiane Bailly as part of a "new race" of innovative and exciting young French designers, described as "stylists who work for ready-to-wear."

Rosier, herself a keen skier, produced particularly distinctive ski-wear whose streamlined design was in stark contrast to previous models. In 1966 Eugenia Sheppard proclaimed that Rosier's slimline skiwear had "defeated the old-time bulky teddy-bear look". Other suits were made in quilted nylon velvet and vivid colours with detachable face panels such as the one featured on the front cover of Sports Illustrated magazine for 13 November 1967. She offered helmets with rotating green-to-clear visors (designed by Monique Dofny) and her "stainless steel" and silver suits in nylon and lurex were described as "pure James Bond," and having "cosmic flair."

Rosier also designed for White Stag in the US, and Jaeger in the UK. One of her clear PVC raincoats for Young Jaeger was chosen by Ernestine Carter as part of the Dress of the Year for 1966, along with a Simone Mirman hat and a Young Jaeger black and white dress. She designed parachute jumpsuits for Raquel Welch to wear in the 1967 film Fathom. In 1988, V de V was purchased by Sergio Tacchini.

== Films ==
Since 1973, Rosier worked as a film director and screenwriter for French-language cinema. Her first two films George Who?, a biography of George Sand, and Mon coeur est rouge (My Heart is Red), which deals with a female market researcher, have been described as feminist. She then produced television documentaries before returning to films with Embrasse-moi (Kiss Me) (1989).

=== As producer, director & writer ===
- Mon coeur est rouge a.k.a. Paint my Heart Red(1976)

=== As director & writer ===
- George qui? a.k.a. George Who? (1973)
- Embrasse-moi (1989)
- Pullman paradis (1995)
- Malraux, tu m'étonnes! (2001)

=== Director only ===
- Ah! La libido (2009)

=== Television documentaries ===
- Le Futur des Femmes (1975)
- La Demoiselle aux Oiseaux (1976)
- Mimi (1979)
- Un Café Un! (1981)
- Le Gros Départ (1982)
- Botaniques (series of five short documentaries, 1982)

== Biography ==
- Lydia Kamitsis, Michèle Rosier, Paris, Editions du Regard, 2014, 136 p. (ISBN 9782841053230)
