= Maxfield Parrish (clothing) =

British clothing company

- Industry: Fashion design and retail
- Founded: 1972
- Founder: Nigel Preston
- Headquarters: London, England
- Key people: Nigel Preston, Brenda Knight

Maxfield Parrish was a British fashion brand founded by Nigel Preston in the early 1970s. With an international reputation – especially for its work in leathers – it was selected as part of the Dress of the Year in 1982.

== Establishment and early years ==
Maxfield Parrish was established just off the King's Road in 1972. The brand was named after the American artist and illustrator Maxfield Parrish, who was admired by founder Nigel Preston.

Preston, who had trained in art and then dabbled in the music industry – once supporting Hawkwind at a gig in Hampstead – began with a stall on Portobello Road selling women's tops made of chamois leather. He was self taught and had made clothes for many years, learning pattern making by deconstructing clothes. Originally the store focused on what Preston's obituary described as men's clothes "of dandyesque theatricality". He was soon attracting pop stars of both sexes and his clothes were worn by, among others, Suzi Quatro. Another fan was Julie Andrews who, it was reported, would only buy her leather trousers from Maxfield Parrish. In the early days the business was underfunded and Preston lived out of a suitcase; he received financial support from David Ford, who was his business partner until 1984.

== Move into high fashion ==
By 1978, Preston's wife Brenda Knight – who had first met him when she provided some fashion PR that secured Maxfield Parrish coverage in Vogue – began to move the brand towards more mainstream fashion, spotting its potential in international markets. It began showing at the London Designer Collections – forerunner to London Fashion Week – and by 1981 it was attracting coverage for its suede and leather fashions. Suzy Menkes said in October that year: "Nigel Preston of Maxfield Parrish has some superb ideas in suede and leather, especially pin-striped suede and big skirts in the softest chamois, but the collection needs editing".

The label very quickly found an audience – thanks in part to a huge revival of interest in wearing suede and leather at the start of the 1980s. A 1982 article, also by Suzy Menkes, said that leather trousers had become a "classic" and suede jackets were no longer a luxury item; it said this was a British fashion story – most Italian designers were buying their skins from the UK. The article singled out Jean Muir, Roland Klein and Maxfield Parrish, saying: "Now Maxfield Parrish have a thriving wholesale business with impressive export orders and show everything from seductive long skirts to simple T-shirts, pin-striped blazers and even jewel-coloured sheepskins, which are a fashion gallop away from heavy, horsey ginger suede".

=== Dress of the Year and Pirelli Calendar ===
In 1982, the brand was selected to be part of the Dress of the Year at Fashion Museum, Bath. That year two outfits were chosen – one comprised a linen ensemble by Margaret Howell and Maxfield Parrish supplied a chamois leather outfit; the selector was Grace Coddington of Vogue.

In 1984, Maxfield Parrish was among 14 British designers chosen to create garments and accessories for a revival of the Pirelli Calendar. The company designed a fur cape featuring a tyre track motif and a wrap dress in chamois leather. The calendar was photographed by Norman Parkinson and the Maxfield Parrish designs created for the photography are now housed in the Victoria and Albert Museum, having earlier been auctioned for charity. All calendar designs were also displayed in the museum in 1986–87.

== International reputation and innovation ==
Preston continued to develop new techniques and ways of working with leathers. His obituary noted that he invented washed leather as a fashion item and later experimented with techniques such as painting, waxing and brocading leather, also looking for ways to increase its suppleness. He was successful in the Italian market and considered a high-fashion brand in Los Angeles. By 1991, Liz Smith in The Times said: "Nigel Preston's sarong skirts, bush shirts and jackets in supple suede have long been classics collected by fashion purists".

By this stage, Maxfield Parrish designs were available in the UK via retailers such as Joseph and Harvey Nichols. Preston, speaking in 1991, described how he continued to try to work suede into new shapes: "It is difficult to get fullness and suede does not float... I have just spent a week on one set of patterns trying to make the pattern 'kick' – with fabric it would have been easy". By this stage, most of the company's leathers were sourced from France and its biggest turnover was in Italy.

=== Later years ===
The brand was continued by Preston and Knight after their move to France in 1993 – they had bought a chateau there in the 1980s. Preston died in 2008 and Knight continued to work under the Preston label.
