= Gordon Luke Clarke =

Fashion designer

Gordon Luke Clarke, also known as Luke, was a New Zealand fashion designer based in London during the 1970s.

Clarke was born in Auckland on 9 August 1945 to a Scottish father and Māori mother. At the age of 18, he went to work for the British couturier Hardy Amies as a designer of ready-to-wear for five years, before going on a tour of India. He also worked for Valentino. On his return to London, he launched his ready-to-wear boutique Luke, on the King's Road, Chelsea. He also sold his clothing exclusively through Bonwit Teller in the United States in 1973, stating that although his work had been compared to American sportswear, he felt it was more refined and had a more couture-like appearance.

In 1978, along with a man's outfit by Cerruti, one of Clarke's womenswear ensembles was chosen by Barbara Griggs of the Daily Mail to represent the year in the Fashion Museum, Bath's Dress of the Year collection. Griggs considered Clarke to be one of the very few notable designers of the time, praising his ability to make attractive garments that followed the "big, baggy and bulky" multi-layered fashions of 1977–78. The ensemble she chose was a printed cotton tunic, skirt and leggings, worn in combination with a black leather skirt and coat, which represented Clark's focus on very simply shaped, versatile mix-and-match separates for the career woman.
