= Chelsea boot =

Close-fitting ankle boot with elastic panels

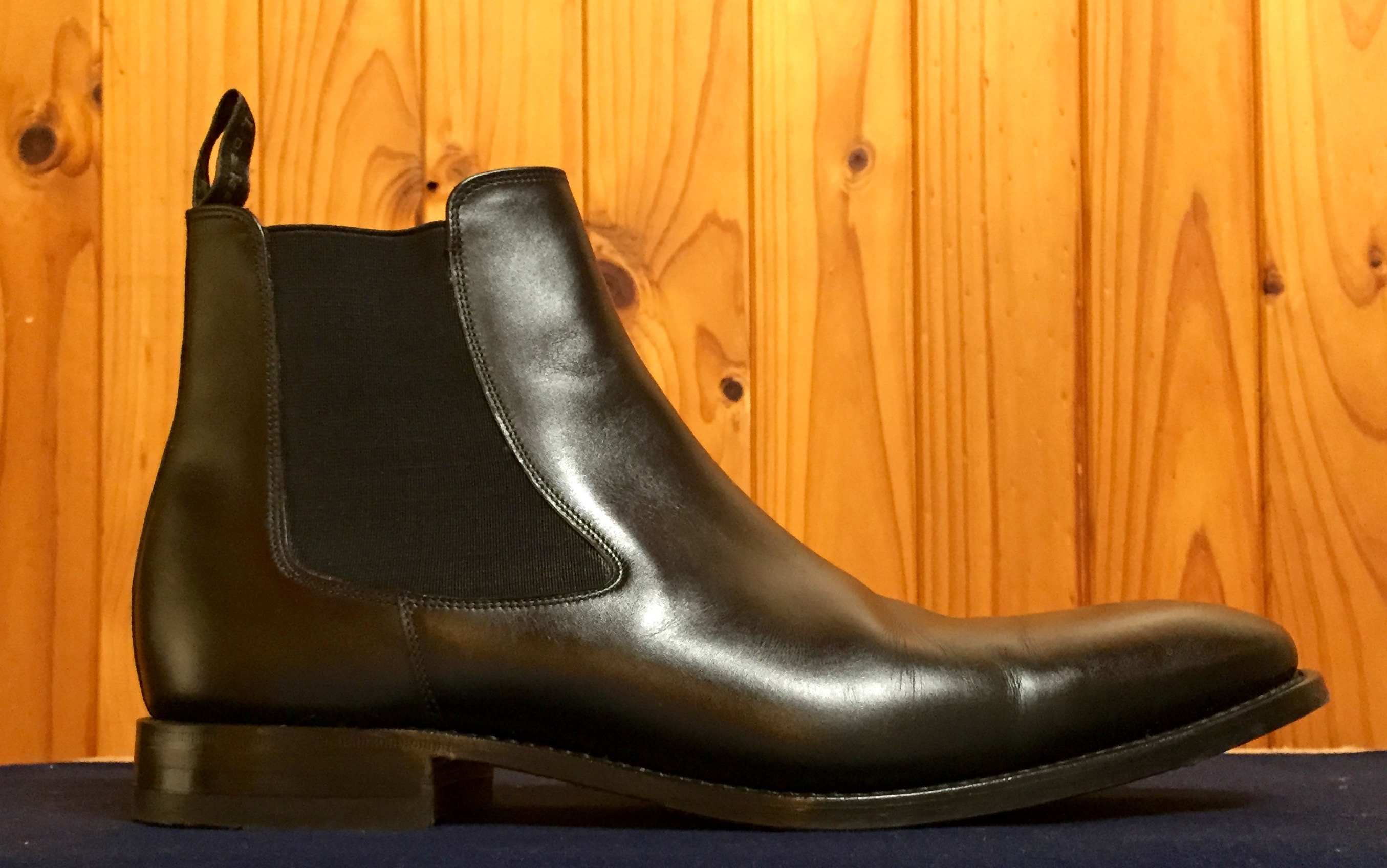
Chelsea boot in black calf leather

Chelsea boots are close-fitting, ankle-length boots with elastic side panels, a low heel and a snug fit around the ankle. They often have a loop or tab of fabric on the back of the boot, enabling the boot to be pulled on. The boot dates back to the Victorian era, when it was worn by both men and women.

Chelsea boots and some of their variants were considered an iconic fashion element of the 60s in Britain, particularly in the mod scene.

== History ==
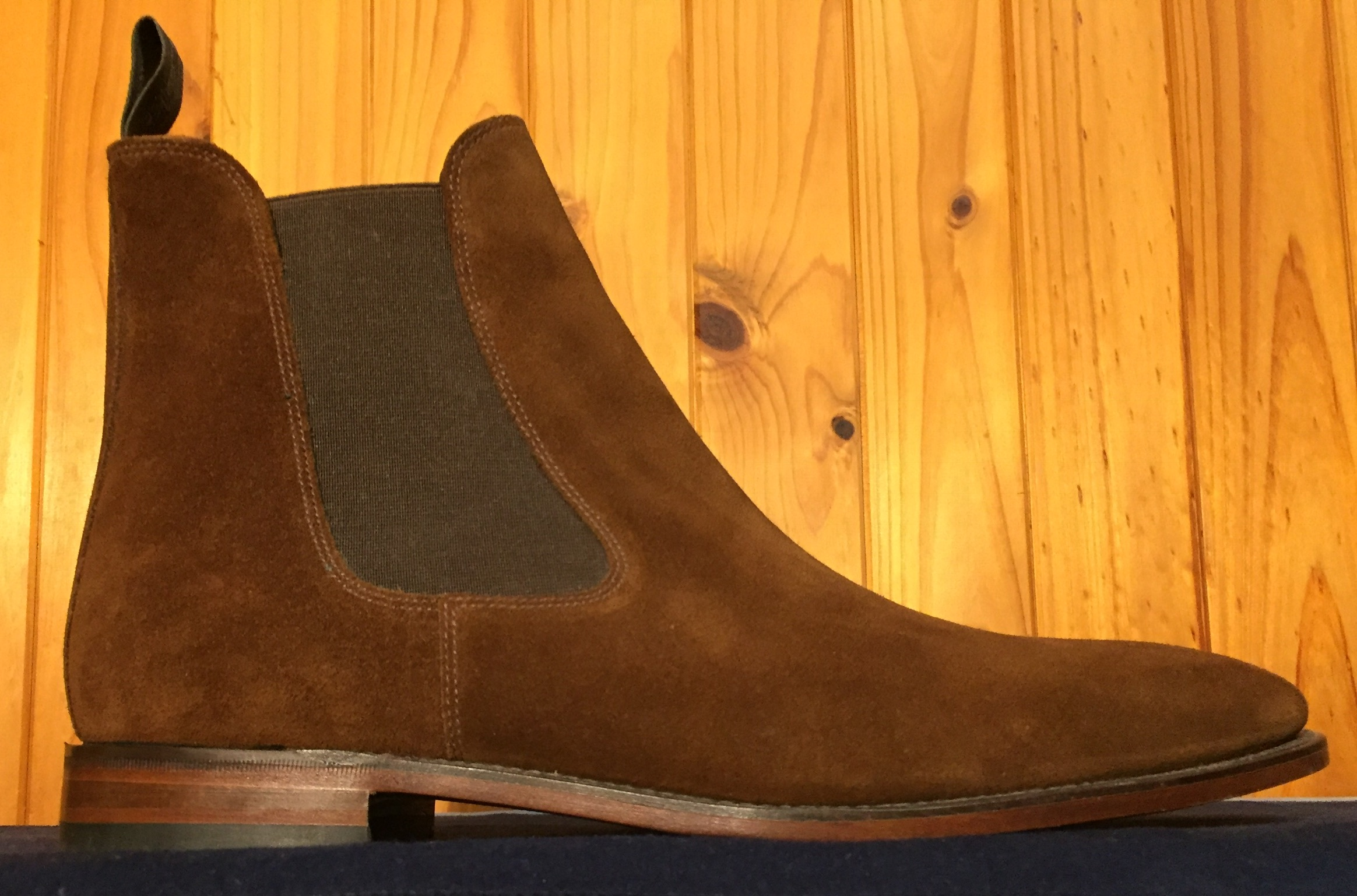
Chelsea boot in brown suede

The design is credited to Queen Victoria's shoemaker Joseph Sparkes Hall. Hall claimed that "She (Queen Victoria) walks in them daily and thus gives the strongest proof of the value she attaches to the invention". In his advertising they are branded J. Sparkes Hall's Patent Elastic Ankle Boots. The boot became popular for horse riding as well as walking.

Charles Goodyear's development of vulcanised rubber enabled the invention of the elastic gusset boot. The advantage of elasticised boots meant they could be readily removed and put on. By the late 1840s they had become fashionable, and it remained a prominent style in the West until the onset of World War I.

In the 1950s and 1960s, Chelsea boots enjoyed a resurgence in the UK – and their association with trendy King's Road (a street in Chelsea and Fulham in inner western London) social set of Swinging London – worn by everyone from the Rolling Stones to Jean Shrimpton – is when Chelsea became contemporary name of the boot.

== Variations and similar styles ==
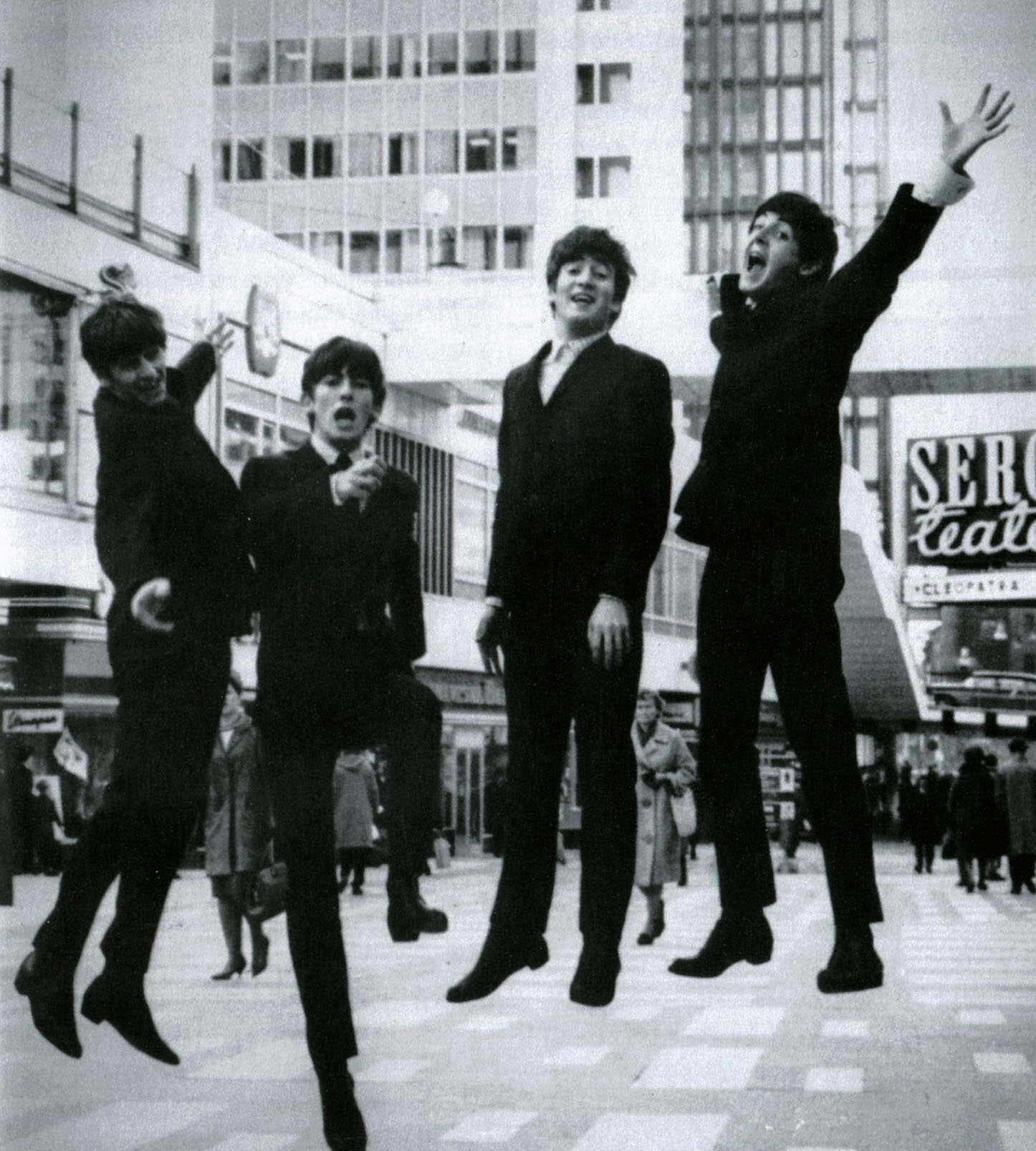
The Beatles, seen here in 1963, helped to popularise Chelsea boots.

=== Beatle boots ===
Theatrical and ballet shoe maker Anello & Davide created a variant of the Chelsea boot in 1961 with Cuban heels and pointed toes for the Beatles, after John Lennon and Paul McCartney saw some Chelsea boots in its shop window and commissioned four pairs with higher, Cuban heels – this style became known as Beatle boots.

Beatle boots, along with Chelsea boots, were frequently adopted by mods and rockers and worn with tailored suits.

=== Work boots ===
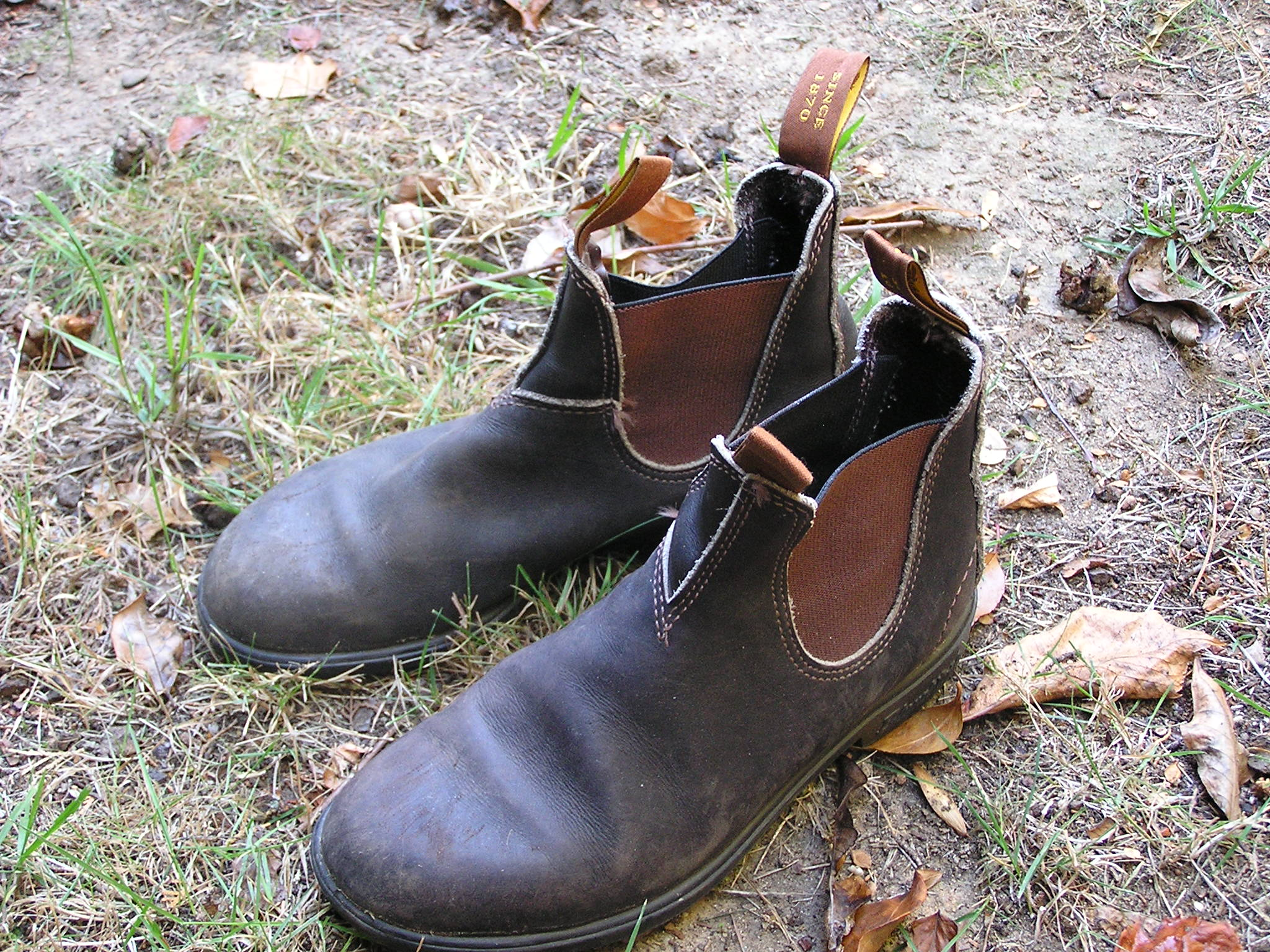
Australian work boots are a variation of the Chelsea boot.

Variants used as work boots include a type of riding boot called Jodhpur boots, originating from India, as well as other designs, including Australian work boots like those manufactured by R.M. Williams, Blundstone and other companies. Such work boots may have steel toes. In Brazil this kind of boot is known as a botina. Often rugged and utilitarian in design, and similar to Australian work boots, they are commonly associated with caipiras or the rural population in general.

== See also ==
- List of boots
- List of shoe styles
- Side-gusset shoes
- Beatle boots and Winklepickers
- Riding boots, Jodhpur boots, and Australian work boots
