= Paolo Carzana =

Welsh fashion designer (born 1995)

- Born: 1995 (age 30–31); Cardiff, Wales
- Education: University of Westminster (BA); Central Saint Martins (MA)
- Label: Paolo Carzana
- Awards: Finalist, LVMH Prize (2024)
- Website: paolocarzana.com

Paolo Carzana (born 1995) is a Welsh fashion designer based in London. He founded his eponymous label, Paolo Carzana, in 2022 and shows his collections at London Fashion Week. His clothes are made by hand from organic, antique, and repurposed materials colored with natural dyes. Vogue critic Sarah Mower has compared his talent to that of Alexander McQueen and John Galliano. Carzana was a finalist for the LVMH Prize in 2024, and pieces from his Fall/Winter 2023 collection are held by the Metropolitan Museum of Art's Costume Institute.

== Early life and education ==
Carzana was born in 1995 in Cardiff, the capital of Wales, and raised there. His mother is Welsh and worked as a civil servant; his father, a builder, is of Italian descent, and the family keeps ties to Macugnaga, a village in the Piedmont region of northern Italy where his great-grandfather built a house. His grandfather was the first of the family to move to England, and eventually became head waiter at the Café Royal in London. Carzana has said that he identifies as Welsh rather than British through his mother's family. Bullied at school, he spent lunch breaks in the art room, where teachers showed him books on McQueen, Gianni Versace, and milliner Philip Treacy. His upbringing included churchgoing and religious schooling. He became a vegan in 2016, out of concern for animal welfare.

Carzana moved to London to study fashion design at the University of Westminster, interning at Walter Van Beirendonck in Antwerp and at Versus Versace during his degree. His 2018 graduate collection, "The Boy You Stole: The Land We Fill", was vegan and organically sourced and was shown at London Fashion Week that year. He then took the MA fashion course at Central Saint Martins, where his studies were supported by the British Fashion Council and Kering's Scholarship for Sustainability, the LVMH Grand Prix Scholarship, and the James Pantyfedwen Scholarship, and where milliner Nasir Mazhar was one of his tutors. Carzana made every garment of his MA collection himself, without using the school's technicians; the collection, built from Welsh tapestry cloth, pineapple leather, and cellulose fibers, was shown at the Central Saint Martins MA show during London Fashion Week in February 2020, and he graduated that year.

== Career ==
=== "Another World" and first presentations ===
After graduating, Carzana returned to Cardiff for a year and a half during the COVID-19 pandemic. Working alone in a studio on the Cardiff docks, he made a collection of eighteen looks titled "Another World", hand-sewn from bamboo silk, organic cotton, pineapple leather, and antique Welsh tapestry blankets he had collected and dyed with natural pigments, and presented it with a self-shot film in London Fashion Week's digital program in June 2021. Reviewing the collection for Vogue, Mower called Carzana "a wonder to the fashion world" and likened his talent to that of McQueen and Galliano in their student days.

Back in London, Trino Verkade offered Carzana a residency at the Sarabande Foundation, the charity established by Lee Alexander McQueen, and helped him develop his business. In 2021 he also joined the British Fashion Council's NEWGEN incubator scheme, which supported his label until he graduated from the program in 2025. He founded his eponymous label in 2022, after running a unisex atelier line called Farfallapaolino in 2020. That September he presented his own label at London Fashion Week for the first time, with the Spring/Summer 2023 collection "Imagine We Could Be the Ones to Change It All", its title taken from a note he had written in his BA portfolio in 2018. The collection included coats tailored from Welsh tapestry blankets and "open heart" shirts cut to tug open on the torso, was shown with headwear by Mazhar, and was dedicated to McQueen.

=== "Queer Symphony" and the LVMH Prize ===
Carzana made his catwalk debut in February 2023 with the Fall/Winter 2023 collection "Queer Symphony", fifteen looks colored with vegetable dyes, some of them cut and tailored from Welsh blankets, with wired, gauze-covered shapes fixed to the backs of several models. Writing for The Cut, critic Cathy Horyn named Carzana and Steven Stokey-Daley the most promising of London's new designers. He presented his Spring/Summer 2024 collection that September; Carzana told Horyn he had created the collection alone, with friends and interns joining for the final days, and that the shoes, strips of fabric laced around the models' feet, had been made that morning.

His Fall/Winter 2024 collection "Melanchronic Mountain" took the ascent of a mountain as its theme and was presented at the NEWGEN space at Selfridges. His graduate collection was featured in "REBEL: 30 Years of London Fashion" at the Design Museum, an exhibition marking thirty years of the NEWGEN program.

In February 2024, Carzana was named one of twenty semifinalists for the 2024 LVMH Prize, chosen from more than 2,500 applicants. He reached the final eight in April, and presented his label to the jury at the Louis Vuitton Foundation in Paris on September 10, 2024; the prize went to the Swedish label Hodakova. That year, the Costume Institute at the Metropolitan Museum of Art acquired works from "Queer Symphony", including an ensemble and a sculpture titled "Guardian Angel", made from silk and willow. Four pieces from the collection were shown in the museum's 2024 exhibition Sleeping Beauties: Reawakening Fashion.

=== "Trilogy of Hope" ===
Carzana grouped his collections from Fall/Winter 2024 to Fall/Winter 2025 as a "Trilogy of Hope", which moved from heaven to the underworld to purgatory. The second part, "How to Attract Mosquitos", was shown in September 2024 in the back garden of his East London home; his parents had spent the previous month clearing the garden, and a local pub hosted the hair and makeup team. The show opened with a model kneeling at a pond, a reworking of Caravaggio's Narcissus. Reviewing the season for The Cut, Horyn called Carzana "a defiant kink in the fashion system".

The trilogy closed with "Dragons Unwinged at the Butchers Block", shown in February 2025 at the Holy Tavern, an eighteenth-century pub in Clerkenwell. Carzana hand-painted and sprayed the collection's colors, drawn from dyes including logwood, madder, turmeric, and cochineal, and described the dragon as a metaphor for humanity's destruction of the earth and for LGBTQ+ rights, a theme tied to Y Ddraig Goch, the red dragon of Wales.

His Spring/Summer 2026 collection, "The Last Pangolin on Earth", was shown in September 2025 in the reading rooms of the British Library, where Carzana had spent the summer researching images of extinct and endangered animals.

=== Dover Street Market ===
By 2025, the label counted Dover Street Market in Paris and Tokyo among its stockists, alongside sales through its own website and Fantastic Toiles, the nomadic London retail project founded by Mazhar. In August 2026, Carzana released "Il Risotto", a see-now-buy-now collection sold through Dover Street Market's seven stores, each piece delivered with a hand-written label styled as a waiter's order; the concept drew on the cucina povera cooking of his Italian aunt. The label presented its Spring/Summer 2027 collection in September 2026 at St Cuthbert's, a nineteenth-century Arts and Crafts church in Earls Court, whose history of sheltering people during the AIDS crisis informed the choice of venue.

== Design approach ==
Carzana makes his garments himself, often working alone or with a small team of friends and interns, draping and sculpting pieces directly on the body. His clothes are frequently cut on the bias, built without fusing, shoulder construction, or internal scaffolding, and fasten with ribbons and knots rather than zippers and buttons. His best-known design is the "open heart" shirt, cut to expose the chest.

His materials are organic, plant-based, antique, or repurposed, among them bamboo silk, organic cotton, pineapple leather, and antique Welsh tapestry blankets and quilts saved from his student years. He favors peace silk, produced without killing the silkworm, over recycled synthetics made from fossil fuels. He dyes fabrics himself with natural ingredients such as madder, turmeric, logwood, onion skins, avocado stones, and cochineal, using mordants such as vinegar or citric acid to shift the colors. He works from a small studio above the Smithfield Market meat market in London. Mazhar has created the headwear for his shows since 2022.

His collections draw on Welsh mythology and religious imagery and are built around a contrast of strength and fragility. He has said that he tries to move "from darkness into the light" with each collection. Horyn has written that his clothes are "wrapped, knotted, and stitched in the most natural and unforced ways", while WWD has described his collections as "fit for museums, couture workrooms and period films".

== Awards ==
Carzana won the Fashion Makes Sense Award in 2018. He was a recipient of the British Fashion Council's NEWGEN scheme from 2021, appearing on its 2023/24 recipient list, and graduated from the program in 2025. In 2024 he was a finalist for the LVMH Prize.

== Personal life ==
Carzana's partner is the photographer Joseph Rigby, who has photographed his collections.
