= Meredith Etherington-Smith =

British fashion and art journalist (1946–2020)

- Born: Meredith Dups; 30 January 1946 Barmouth, Wales
- Died: 25 January 2020 (aged 73) London, England
- Occupation: Journalist; editor; biographer; auction executive
- Education: Royal College of Art
- Spouse: Nick Etherington-Smith (m. 1967, divorced); Jeremy Pilcher (m. 1981)

Meredith Etherington-Smith (née Dups, 30 January 1946 – 25 January 2020) was a British fashion and art journalist and biographer.

== Early life ==
Meredith Dups was born in Barmouth, Wales, on 30 January 1946, and grew up in Kent. She attended the Royal College of Art. In 1967, she married designer Nick Etherington-Smith, and kept his surname after their divorce.

== Career ==
Her career as a journalist began in the 1960s at The Ambassador, and by the 1970s she was the London editor for Vogue Paris and for a year the only female editor of the American men's magazine GQ. After relocating back to London in the early 1980s, she wrote for a wide range of publications including The Times, The Daily Telegraph, and The New York Times, before taking the post of Deputy and Features editor at Harpers & Queen in 1983. As a representative of the magazine, she was the fashion journalist asked to choose the Dress of the Year for 1994, for which she picked a black bias-cut strapless dress by John Galliano.

By the early 1990s, Etherington-Smith was established as an art journalist. She was a founder of Art Fortnight, and has been an editor of ArtReview. In 2006, she was the editor-in-chief of Christie's Magazine and the London editor of Artinfo.com. Whilst at Christie's, Etherington-Smith worked with Diana, Princess of Wales regarding the charity auction of her clothes in 1997, and also curated the 1999 sale of Marilyn Monroe's clothing and personal effects and the 2011 auction of Elizabeth Taylor's wardrobe and jewels.

As a biographer Etherington-Smith has written about the fashion designer Lucy, Lady Duff-Gordon and her sister, novelist Elinor Glyn in The "It" Girls; and about Salvador Dalí in The Persistence of Memory, which was translated into twelve languages.

== Personal life, health and death ==
In 1981, Etherington-Smith married for the second time, to banker Jeremy Pilcher. They lived in Chelsea, London.

In 1990, Etherington-Smith had a mastectomy after being diagnosed with breast cancer, which she wrote about for The Daily Telegraph.

A longtime smoker, Etherington-Smith died from a heart attack at Chelsea and Westminster Hospital on 25 January 2020, at the age of 73.
