= Doris Langley Moore =

British fashion historian (1902–1989)

Doris Langley Moore OBE
- Doris Langley Moore (photo by Lafayette, 1928)
- Born: 1902; Lancashire, England
- Died: 1989 (aged 86–87)
- Occupations: Author, biographer, and fashion historian
- Writing career
- Subjects: Fashion history; Lord Byron

Doris Langley Moore OBE (1902–1989), also known as Doris Langley-Levy Moore, was one of the first important female fashion historians. She founded the Fashion Museum, Bath (as The Museum of Costume), in 1963. She was also a novelist, a well-respected Lord Byron scholar, and author of a 1940s ballet, The Quest. As a result of these wide-ranging interests, she had many connections within fashionable, intellectual, artistic and theatrical circles.

== Early life and career ==
Doris Langley Moore was born in 1902 in Lancashire, England. She was educated in South Africa, where her father was a newspaper editor. At the age of 18, she returned to England to study classical languages at university.

In her twenties, Langley Moore wrote a few lifestyle books, one of which, The Technique of the Love Affair (1928), was reprinted in 1999/2002. This was a tongue-in-cheek self-help book which suggested ways in which love affairs in the post-World War I era could be successfully conducted. Dorothy Parker, reviewing for The New Yorker, commented: "The Technique of the Love Affair makes, I am bitterly afraid, considerable sense. If only it had been placed in my hands years ago, maybe I could have been successful instead of just successive."

Subsequent books included Pandora's Letter-Box (1929) and, in 1933, co-written with her sister June, a guide for society hostesses called The Pleasure of your Company.

== Fashion collection ==
Langley Moore was one of the first major female fashion historians and curators along with Anne Buck. In contrast to male fashion historians such as her friend James Laver and C. Willett Cunnington, Langley Moore favoured a hands-on object-based approach where she drew her conclusions after personally examining surviving artefacts. In 1949, she debunked the myth of the 18-inch (46 cm) waist, which almost all Victorian women were supposed to have had, by measuring over 200 surviving dresses and bodices in collections across the country. Her survey revealed that the average 19th century waist measurement sat comfortably within the 20–30-inch (51–76 cm) range, and that almost none of her subjects had a waist measurement less than 21 inches (53 cm).

Her collection began with fashion plates in the early 1920s, and in 1928 she was given her first period dress. A 1963 Guardian article about the Fashion Museum, Bath, by Alison Adburgham described how this came about: "It was Christmas 1928 and her mother-in-law produced some old dresses out of a trunk for charades. Lady Moore was so surprised that the seemingly shapeless figure of a young woman of the nineteen-twenties could fit into an elegantly waisted Parisian gown of 1877, that she told Doris she might keep it". Some while later, she found a period dress in a shop in Harrogate which she planned to adapt to wear herself. But, as she described it to Adburgham: "As my scissors hovered over the rich lilac damask, I suddenly knew that I was about to do wrong and, with extraordinary effects upon my whole subsequent life, I desisted...if one is born with the sort of acquisitiveness collectors are plagued with, to have two of anything is to set up a mysterious kind of compulsion to multiply".

This led her to embark upon a dedicated quest for further examples of fashion and dress. Until about 1940, she actively sought out material to collect. Langley Moore had a large house in London, which she filled up with her collection, living in a small flat nearby. She recounted to Adburgham how her collection saw out the war in two barns in Berkshire, safe from bombs but not a nest-building hornet.

After the war, there was much greater interest in period clothing. Some of her costumes were borrowed by television companies, or were featured in exhibitions and charity fashion shows. This was when she began receiving gifts to add to her collection, both from unknown and well known people.

Her collecting policy was firm:

A good specimen is one which is not only in sound condition and of nice quality, but which embodies the features of its period in an entirely representative way. A good specimen is completely of its period. If it was ever meant to be fashionable, then it will carry with it still the aura of fashion.

=== Establishment of the museum ===
From 1949 onwards, Langley Moore actively sought to establish a museum dedicated to fashion in the United Kingdom. Apart from the Gallery of Costume in Manchester, opened in 1947, there were no museums in England (and very few worldwide) dedicated solely to dress. In her Proposal for a Museum of Costume, Langley Moore laid out her wishes for an institution which offered facilities for the study of costume, not simply of the past, but also contemporary fashion, and offered displays of both historical and up-to-date fashion. Fundraising began in earnest, and one of the chief triumphs of the campaign was when Christian Dior brought his couture collection and house mannequins to the Savoy Hotel in London, hosting a fashion show in aid of Langley Moore's museum fund.

Langley Moore's collection travelled to various locations during her search for a home for her museum. In 1955, an exhibition opened at Eridge Castle in Kent; the opening was attended by the Queen Mother who had followed Langley Moore's project with interest. It was also briefly displayed at the Royal Pavilion in Brighton and the Octagon Chapel, Bath. The collection was eventually donated to the City of Bath and found a home at the Bath Assembly Rooms, where it opened for the first time in 1963.

== BBC television series ==
In 1957, Men, Women, and Clothes, the BBC's first colour series, was filmed, with Langley Moore presenting examples from her collection. Unfortunately, the BBC did not begin broadcasting colour programmes until eight years later, but Langley Moore invited the Queen Mother to come and watch the series at the BBC studios before it was aired to the public. A copy of the Queen Mother's thank-you letter to Langley Moore is online at the BBC website.

== Biographies ==
In addition to her other interests, Langley Moore was a well-respected Byron scholar and wrote a number of books on Byron and his world. As well as a biography of Byron's legitimate daughter Ada Lovelace, Langley Moore wrote biographies of the author E. Nesbit, the 19th-century ballerina Carlotta Grisi, and Marie Bashkirtseff, the Russian artist, sculptor and diarist. The title of this last book, Marie & the Duke of H, focused on Bashkirtseff's childhood infatuation with William Douglas-Hamilton, 12th Duke of Hamilton.

== Ballet ==
Langley Moore shared Laver's passion for the theatre, ballet and the performing arts. During the Second World War, she wrote the scenario for a ballet, The Quest, which was choreographed by Frederick Ashton for Sadler's Wells and set to music by William Walton, with costumes and sets by John Piper. Langley Moore based her story upon Edmund Spenser's epic allegorical poem The Faerie Queene. The Quest premiered on 6 April 1943 at the New Theatre in London. The ballet provided Moira Shearer with her first created role (Pride) for the company. The cast also included Margot Fonteyn, who created the role of Una, Beryl Grey, and Robert Helpmann.

== Later life ==
Langley Moore remained closely involved with the Museum of Costume after its opening. In addition to this, she continued her work on Byron, publishing three books in the 1970s, including a biography of Byron's daughter, Ada Lovelace.

She died in 1989.

== Honours ==
Langley Moore was appointed an Officer of the Order of the British Empire (OBE) in the 1971 Birthday Honours.

== Selected works ==
=== Film wardrobe ===
- The African Queen (1951) (Wardrobe for Katharine Hepburn)
- Freud: The Secret Passion (1962)

=== Titles on fashion history ===
- The Woman in Fashion (London, 1949)
- The Child in Fashion (London, 1953)
- Fashion Through Fashion Plates 1771–1971 (London, 1971) ISBN 0-7063-1805-6
- Gallery of Fashion 1790–1822: from Plates by Heideloff & Ackermann (1949)

=== Titles on Lord Byron ===
- The Great Byron Adventure (1959)
- The Late Lord Byron: Posthumous Dramas (1961)
- Lord Byron (1971)
- Lord Byron Accounts Rendered (1974)
- Ada, Countess of Lovelace (1977) ISBN 0-06-013012-1

=== Other biographies ===
- E. Nesbit (1933)
- Carlotta Grisi (1947)
- Marie & the Duke of H: The Daydream Love Affair of Marie Bashkirtseff (1966)

=== Other ===
- The Technique of the Love Affair (1928, reprinted 1999, 2002) ISBN 0-7858-1615-1
- Pandora's Letter-Box: Being a Discourse on Fashionable Life (1929)
- A Winter's Passion (1932)
- The Unknown Eros (1935)
- The Pleasure of Your Company: A Textbook of Hospitality (with June Langley Moore) (1933)
- The Vulgar Heart: An Enquiry into the Sentimental Tendencies of Public Opinion (1945)
- Not At Home (1948)
- All Done by Kindness (1951)
- A Game of Snakes and Ladders (1955)
- My Caravaggio Style (1959)
