= Graziella Fontana =

Italian fashion designer

- Occupation: Fashion designer

Graziella Fontana is a Genoese Italian fashion designer who was active in the London Mod fashion scene in the 1960s and early 1970s. One of her designs, a hotpants suit in check Liberty cotton, was chosen as the Dress of the Year in 1971.

== Early life ==
Fontana worked for a number of manufacturers and design houses in France and Britain during the 1960s and early 1970s, including Chloé, where she was a co-designer with Karl Lagerfeld from 1965 to 1972. Although Italian, and associated with the French house of Chloé, she was also listed alongside Ossie Clark and Foale and Tuffin as one of "England's young mod designers". She also designed for the Italian fashion house Max Mara in the mid-1960s, the Scottish knitwear brand Lyle & Scott, and the English designer Judith Hornby, for whom the Dress of the Year hot-pants outfit was created. Fontana was particularly known for her sharply tailored suits.
