= Mondrian Collection =

1965 fashion collection by Yves Saint Laurent

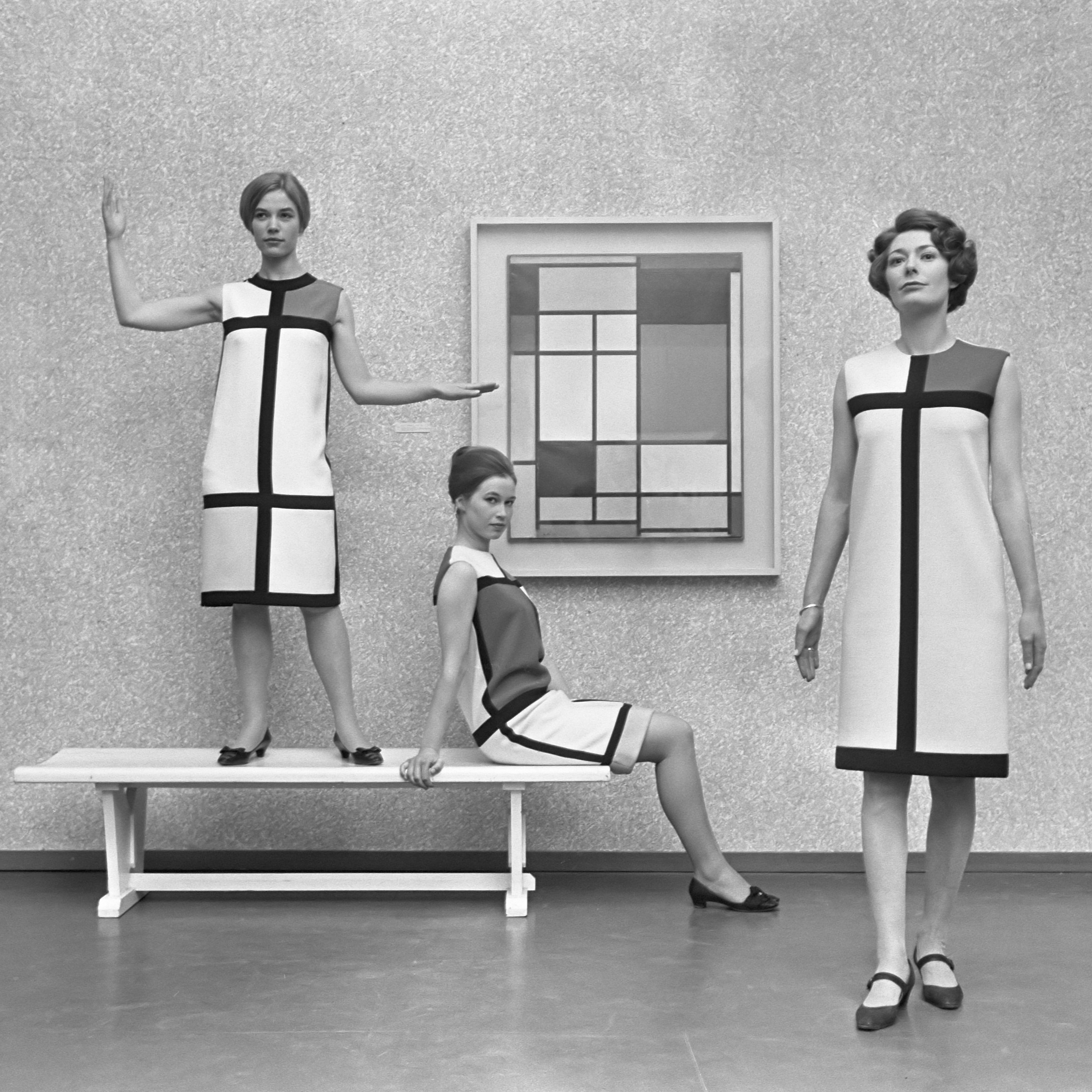
Mondrian dresses by Yves St Laurent (1966)

The Mondrian Collection was designed by French fashion designer Yves Saint Laurent (1936–2008) in 1965. This collection was a homage to the work of several modernistic artists. Part of this collection were six cocktail dresses that were inspired by the paintings of Piet Mondrian (1872–1944). Because these six shift dresses played a major role in this collection, the collection is called the Mondrian Collection. In academic literature it has been questioned whether this name fully covers the aim of the collection, since there are other artists who inspired Saint Laurent such as Poliakoff and Malevich. However, Mondrian seemed to play a leading role in this collection. The dresses were famously accessorized with low-heeled, black pumps with large, geometric-looking metallic buckles across the vamp, produced by Roger Vivier.

== Design and construction ==
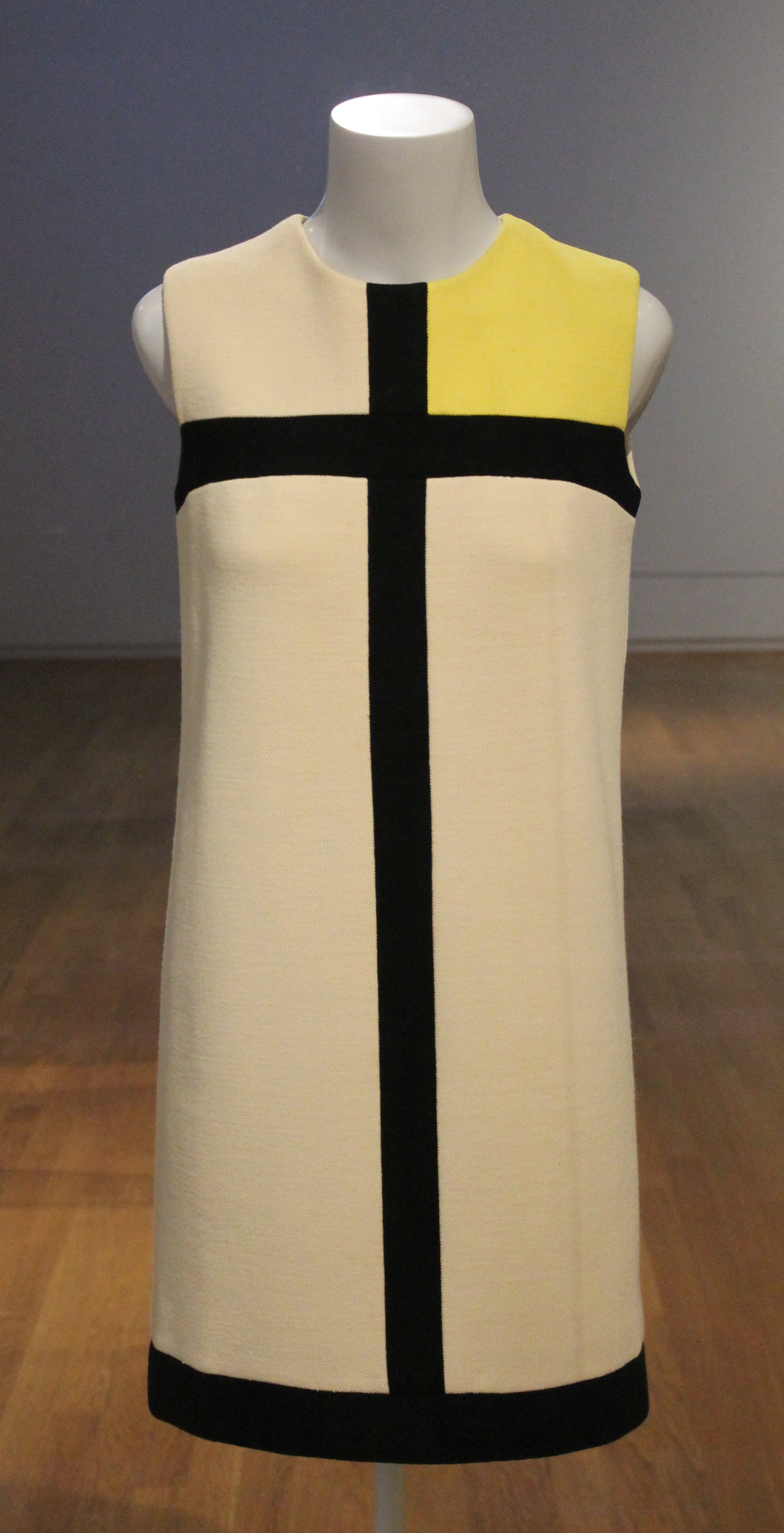
1965 Mondrian dress by Saint Laurent, Rijksmuseum

The six wool jersey and silk A-line Mondrian dresses consisted of graphic black lines and blocks of white and primary colour, directly referencing the work of Mondrian. Rather than being printed, the dresses were made of pre-dyed fabrics, each colour in their design being an individual piece of fabric. Assisted by Azzedine Alaïa, Saint Laurent experimented with the interplay of lines by integrating them into the seams of the garment and giving a seemingly seam-free construction. The weight of the fabrics used ensured that the dresses hung straight, without draping or movement to distort the simplicity of the effect—features that enhanced the Modernism theme of the designs. In interviews Saint Laurent acknowledged that Mondrian inspired him to focus on simple dresses with minimal decoration. Although the overall effect appeared simple, the technique was complex and required precision cutting and work-intensive haute couture techniques to achieve successfully, making the dresses expensive.

=== Precedents ===
Although Saint Laurent's Mondrian dresses were very successful, it was noted that several other designers had produced very similar works beforehand. In 1965, a New York reporter noted that the Mondrian dresses closely resembled two-colour jersey dresses that had already been produced and widely retailed by the French designer Michèle Rosier. The New York Times claimed that the effect of the Mondrian dresses had been achieved two years previously by the American designer John Kloss.

== Convergence of fashion and art ==
The convergence of fashion and art in the Mondrian dresses is significant. Whilst reflecting the fashionable Western silhouette, the designs also reflect the significance of the work of artists like Mondrian during the 1960s. The abstract, geometric visual language of the modernistic Dutch movement De Stijl to which Mondrian belonged was applied to the design of the six dresses.

Saint Laurent was known for his love of fine art, and had an extensive collection covering a wide range of periods and styles which had important influence on his work. He said of Mondrian: ‘Mondrian is purity and one can go no further in purity in painting. This is a purity that joins with that of the Bauhaus. The masterpiece of the twentieth century is a Mondrian’. The dresses have been described as a canvas on which Saint Laurent experimented with his artistic ideas, and have become regarded as having captured the Zeitgest of their era. As icons of 1965 fashion the dresses have been described as giving a new perspective on haute couture—namely that it didn't have to consist of a total look any more, and that it could be easy to wear.

== Popularity ==
The Mondrian collection was widely published in many fashion magazines, with one dress featuring on the cover of Vogue in 1965. Mondrian style dresses became very popular, with many mass manufacturers producing copies of the designs for lower prices, which were then widely circulated. The copying was so widespread that Saint Laurent became a little disenchanted with this collection during the peak of its success, saying at one point, "I hate Mondrian now."

In 2018, the American company Mattel, manufacturer of the Barbie doll, and the Yves Saint Laurent Museum created a joint mini-collection of dolls dressed in replicas of famous outfits designed by the French couturier: the “Mondrian” dress, the 1968 “Safari” jacket, and the 1983 “Paris” evening gown.

== In museums ==
The original Mondrian dresses can be found in several museums around the world, including the Rijksmuseum in Amsterdam, the Victoria and Albert Museum in London, and the Metropolitan Museum of Art in New York.
