= Simone Mirman =

British milliner (1912–2008)

Simone Mirman (née Parmentier)
- Mirman with her designs, late 1950s
- Born: 18 May 1912; Paris, France
- Died: 1 August 2008 (aged 96); France

Simone Mirman (1912–2008) was a Paris-born milliner based in London, chiefly known for her designs for the British royal family.

== Early life ==
Simone Parmentier was born in Paris on 18 May 1912 to middle-class Catholic parents.

Simone had an apprenticeship with Rose Valois, one of the leading Parisian milliners of the 1920s and 1930s, where she developed her talent for designing hats to suit the trickiest faces, considering her first success to be a design which worked for her mother's features.

In her early 1920s Simone met a Jewish medical student, Serge Mirman, whose communist beliefs made him undesirable to her parents. Despite neither speaking English, the couple eloped to London in 1937, but only married in 1939.

== Millinery ==
=== Early career ===
In London, Simone worked with the couturiere Elsa Schiaparelli, who was renowned for her bold millinery designs and concepts. She headed the hat department of Schiaparelli's London branch in Upper Grosvenor Street, Mayfair until it closed down at the outbreak of war in 1939. However, Schiaparelli generously gave Simone the contact details of her English clientele, enabling her to successfully launch her own business.

=== Business ===
During the Second World War the newly-wed, impoverished Mirmans lived in a small attic on Spring Street in Paddington. Each morning, they hid the evidence of their real life and transformed the attic into a millinery salon for Simone to serve customers seeking off-ration hats. As clothing coupons were not required for hats, there was a steady demand for the designs Mirman created out of scraps and oddments.

In 1947, Mirman was able to afford better premises near Hyde Park. In 1952, she moved to Chesham Place, Belgravia, where her salon and workroom remained for the rest of her professional career.

By the early 1950s Mirman was supplying hats to the designers Norman Hartnell, Hardy Amies, and Christian Dior. She also supplied faithfully copied Dior model hats to John Cavanagh's 1952 debut fashion show – the first time Dior had allowed a copy of his hat design to be used by another couturier. It was through Serge Mirman that Dior's licensed hosiery became established upon the London retail scene.

Aside from royalty, her notable clients included the actresses Vivien Leigh and Valerie Hobson, as well as members of the English aristocracy and society. On a less exalted level, Mirman designed caps to accompany the 1967 policewoman uniforms designed by Norman Hartnell.

Through the 1960s and 1970s Mirman continued making fashionable hats. She created fun versions of the 1960s helmet hats encrusted with plastic gems, and ultra-modern leather or plastic helmets with clear tinted PVC visors in 1966. Ernestine Carter chose one of these hats to complete the 1966 Dress of the Year ensemble. Serge also helped his wife design, and he was probably responsible for the more outlandish and eccentric Mirman hats that attracted the attention of the press.

In 1978 she also designed another women's cap for the Metropolitan Police, this time with a soft top, but its impracticality led to its rapidly gaining the nicknames 'butcher's boy' or 'Smurf' and it was withdrawn 18 months later. After Serge died in 1980, Simone Mirman closed down her Belgravia salon, and ran a small shop for leather goods and simple headgear with the assistance of her daughter, Sophie Mirman. Sophie went on to found Sock Shop and the childrenswear boutique Trotters.

=== Royalty ===
In 1952, after Princess Margaret reportedly decided that their usual milliner, Aage Thaarup, was too expensive, Simone Mirman was invited to Buckingham Palace to show her hats to Queen Elizabeth, her mother, and Princess Margaret. Despite a nervous Mirman breaking protocol by entering through the front door of the palace, the royals became regular customers. Mirman was later granted the royal warrants of Queen Elizabeth II and the Queen Mother in recognition of her services.

Mirman's designs for royalty took into account their individual preferences – light and airy hats lavishly trimmed with flowers and feathers for the Queen Mother; and the very latest fashions for Princess Margaret. The Queen insisted on hats that would please photographers – off-the-face brims (if any), clear colours to co-ordinate with her Norman Hartnell and Hardy Amies outfits, and unusual fabrics to make her stand out in a crowd. A typical Mirman design for the Queen was the cloche hat densely covered with small flowers. Perhaps the best-known individual Simone Mirman hats for the Queen are the dramatic 1969 Tudor gable hood-inspired hat the Queen wore at the investiture of Charles, Prince of Wales and the pink hat with 25 fabric bells that the Queen wore to mark her Silver Jubilee at a thanksgiving service at St Paul's Cathedral. In 2003 several Mirman hats were displayed alongside clothes worn by the Queen in an exhibition at the Kensington Palace State Apartments.

== Retirement and death ==
Simone Mirman retired in 1990 and returned to France, where she took up oil painting as a hobby until losing her eyesight. She died in 2008 at the age of 96.

== Simone Mirman quote ==
"If your features are even, you can wear a small hat even though your face is large. A small woman can wear a big hat in spite of all the warnings against it; but it must be in proportion to her size. She should never try to wear a hat to make her look taller. She'll fool no one about her size that way."
