= John Bates (designer) =

English fashion designer (1935–2022)

John Bates (11 January 1935 – 5 June 2022) was an English fashion designer who, working as Jean Varon, was part of the boutique scene that blossomed in London in the 1960s.

== Biography ==
Bates was born in Ponteland, Northumberland, on 11 January 1935. From 1951 to 1952, he worked as a trainee journalist and office assistant in London.

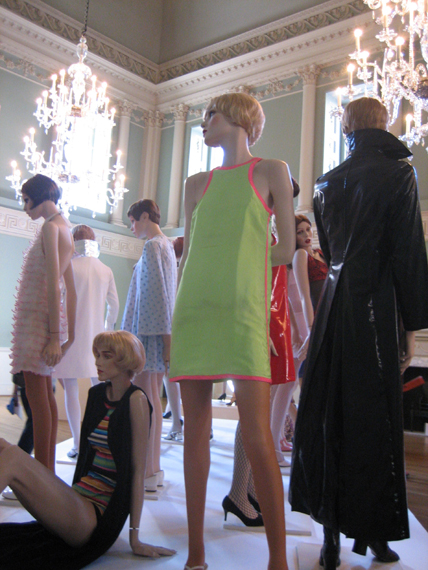
Group of 1960s minidresses designed by John Bates for Jean Varon, including a 1966 fluorescent green micro-mini worn by Marit Allen. Exhibited at the Fashion Museum, Bath, 2006

From 1953 to 1955, he served in the British Army. Since 1956, Bates apprenticed under Gérard Pipart at Herbert Sidon. From 1959 he began designing under the name Jean Varon.

Bates' work as Jean Varon in the 1960s was particularly modernistic. He designed dresses with bare midriffs, sheer panels, and very short hemlines, and as early as 1962 was designing high-fashion plastic garments. In 1965, one of his dresses with a mesh midriff was chosen as the Dress of the Year and donated to the Fashion Museum, Bath, which in 2006 held a major retrospective show of his work.

One of Bates' most influential champions was Marit Allen, the editor of British Vogue's Young Ideas spread, who considered Bates the true inventor of the miniskirt, rather than Mary Quant or André Courrèges. Ernestine Carter also observed Bates' originality, noting that the Paris fashion collections for 1967 contained many looks which Bates had done first.

In 1965 Bates designed memorable outfits for Diana Rigg to wear for her role as Emma Peel in The Avengers, including Op-Art mini-coats and accessories in graphic black and white, and a silver ensemble comprising a bra bodice, low-slung trousers, and a jacket. In the same vein he designed a modernistic space-age wedding outfit for Marit Allen in 1966 consisting of a white gabardine mini-coat and matching dress with silver PVC collar and lapels.

From 2002 until his death, Bates lived in Wales with his partner, John Siggins. He died from cancer on 5 June 2022, at the age of 87.
