= Gina Fratini =

English fashion designer (1931–2017)

- Born: Georgina Caroline Eve Butler; 22 September 1931; Kobe, Japan
- Died: 25 May 2017 (aged 85); London, England
- Occupation: Fashion designer
- Spouses: David Goldberg (m. 1954; div. 1961) Renato Fratini (m. 1961; div. 1968) Jimmy Logan (m. 1969; div. 1977)
- Partner: Anthony Newley (1993–1999)

Gina Fratini (born Georgina Caroline Eve Butler, 22 September 1931 – 25 May 2017) was a Japanese-born British fashion designer.

== Early life ==
She was born in Kobe, Japan, the daughter of the Somerset Butler (son of Charles Ernest Alfred French Somerset Butler, 7th Earl of Carrick) and his wife Barbara, and spent most of her childhood in India. Her godfather was Sir Victor Sassoon. On her return to the UK, she studied at the Royal College of Arts.

== Career ==
She set up her own business in 1964 and became one of the top British designers of the early 1970s, winning the Dress of the Year Award in 1975; some of her garments from the period are held in the Victoria & Albert Museum's costume collection. Among the top personalities who wore Fratini designs was Elizabeth Taylor, who wore a Fratini wedding dress for her second wedding to Richard Burton. Diana, Princess of Wales, also wore Fratini designs to public events.

As a designer, she was known for her use of natural fabrics such as cotton and silk and her long "fantasy"-style dresses, which were not easily reproduced by cheaper dressmakers. In 1989, she closed down her business but continued to work for individual clients such as the Princess of Wales, who wore one of her creations for a 1990 official portrait by Terence Donovan; she also produced some designs for Norman Hartnell.

== Marriages ==
Gina's first marriage was in 1954, to David Goldberg. They were divorced in 1961, and Fratini married the Italian illustrator Renato Fratini, but they divorced in 1968. Finally, in 1969, she married James Alan Short, a Scottish actor/comedian better known as Jimmy Logan; they divorced in 1977. She was romantically involved with the actor Anthony Newley from 1993 onwards. The couple had known each other in the 1950s. Following Newley's death, Fratini was quoted as saying: "We came back together at the perfect time, I suppose ... But it ended too soon."

== Later life ==
Following the closure of Fratini's fashion house November 1989, she had no regular employment. She lived with Anthony Newley in Jensen Beach, Florida, from 1993 until his death in 1999. Her long-time assistant and housekeeper, Marie, accompanied her on the move to the United States. Fratini died on 25 May 2017 in London.
