= Beatle boot =

Style of footwear

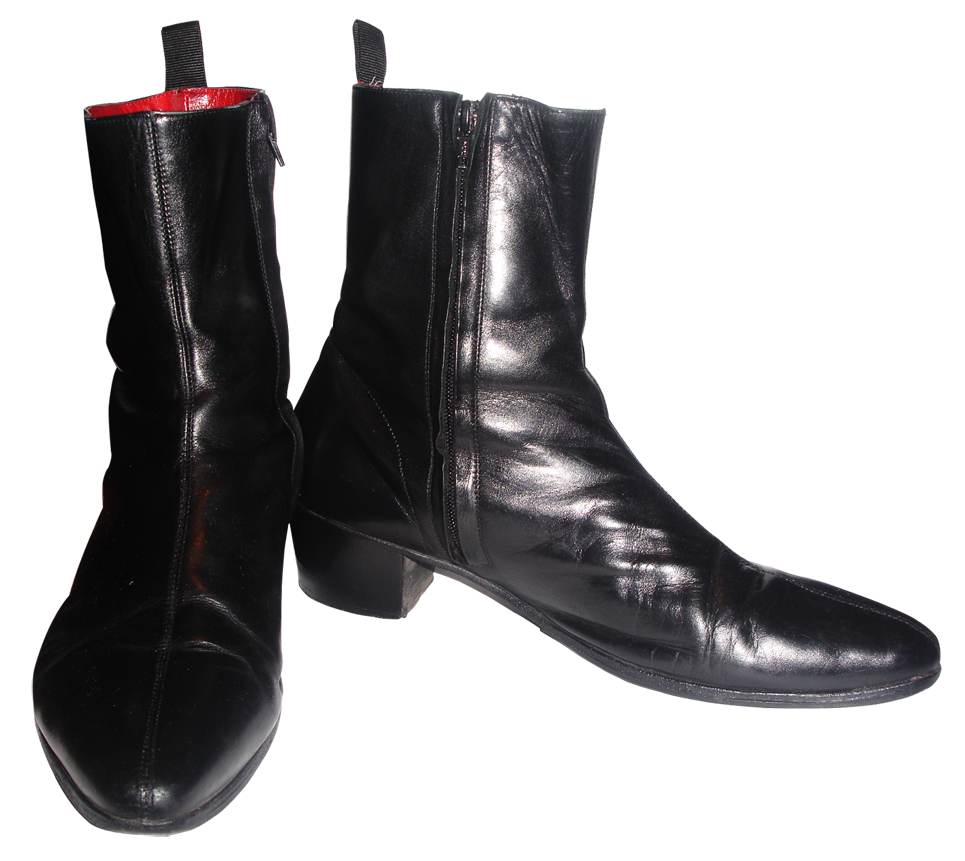
A pair of Beatle boot replicas

A Beatle boot or Cuban boot is a style of boot that has been worn since the late 1950s but made popular by the English rock group the Beatles in the 1960s. The boots are a variant of the Chelsea boot: they are tight-fitting, Cuban-heeled, ankle-high boots with a sharp pointed toe. The style can feature either elastic or zipped sides.

Beatle boots saw the reintroduction of high-heeled footwear for men.

== History ==
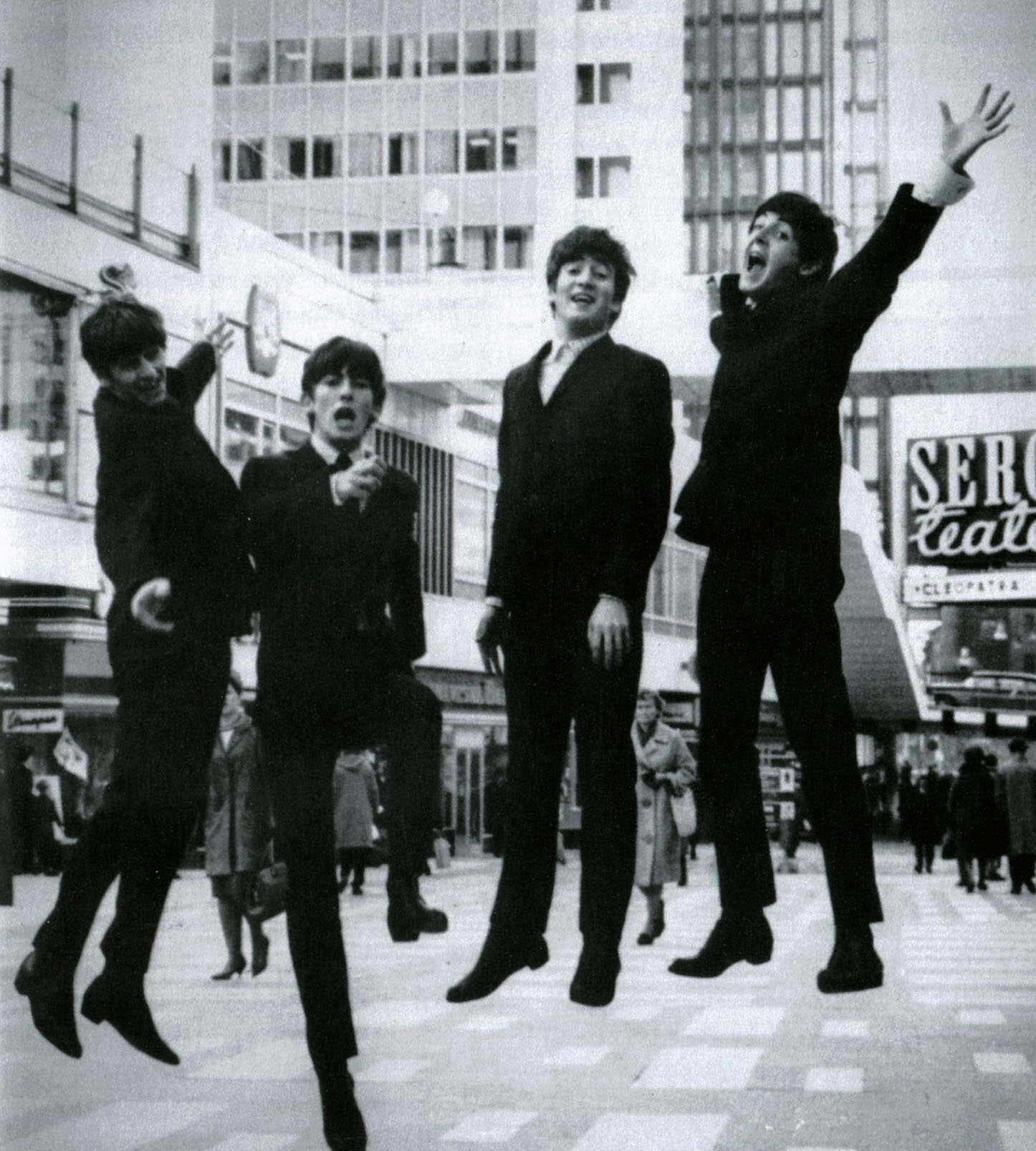
The Beatles, seen here in 1963

Beatle boots are a direct descendant of the Chelsea boot, but have an even more pointed toe—compare the slightly earlier winklepickers—and a centre seam stitch running from ankle to toe, and the flamenco boot, from which its Cuban heel was derived. Beatle boots originated in 1958, but in October 1961 English musicians John Lennon, George Harrison and Paul McCartney saw Chelsea boots while in Hamburg, being worn by a London band, and then went to the London footwear company Anello & Davide to commission four pairs (with the addition of Cuban heels) for the Beatles, to complement their new suit image upon their return from Hamburg.

Beatle boots were very popular with rock bands and artists during the late 1950s, but started to decline during the late 1960s. They were worn by subcultures such as Teddy Boys, beatniks, rockers and psyches etc. The boots saw a surge of popularity during the punk movement in the late 1970s and early 1980s, but again started to decline throughout the 1990s. During the late 2000s and early 2010s, the boots saw a steady surge in popularity.

== See also ==
- Pointed shoes
- Chelsea boots
- List of shoe styles
- 1960s in fashion
- Music and fashion
