= Ugo Correani =

Italian fashion designer

- Born: 1935; Frascati, Italy
- Died: 18 September 1992 (aged 56–57); Milan, Italy
- Occupation: Fashion designer
- Known for: Accessories and jewelry design

Ugo Correani (1935 – 18 September 1992) was an Italian fashion designer specializing in accessories and jewelry design.

== Life and career ==
Born in Frascati, at 20 years old Correani moved to Milan to work in the atelier of Germana Marucelli. In 1973, fashion designer Walter Albini convinced him to use his creativity in accessories, and from then Correani specialized in making necklaces, bracelets and earrings. His jewellery was often inspired by nature and he used materials such as driftwood, coral and stones.

In 1976, Correani started a long professional relationship with Gianni Versace, also becoming a close friend of him. In 1984, they also began collaborating with La Scala making the costumes and the jewelry for its theater productions. Correani used to say "The day that I die I want to be buried in a red suit and a shirt by Versace." He also collaborated with Valentino, Chanel, Fendi, Chloé, Christian Lacroix among others.

Struck by AIDS, Correani died on 18 September 1992 of heart attack in his house in Milan.
