= Walter Steiger =

French shoe company

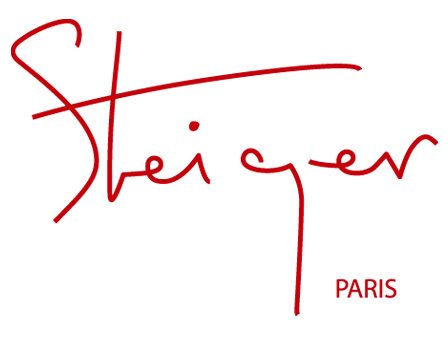
Steiger logo

Walter Steiger is a French shoe company, founded in Geneva in 1932 by Walter Steiger senior.

Walter Steiger was founded in Geneva in 1932 by Walter Steiger senior, making made-to-measure shoes for men and women.

His eldest son, also Walter Steiger, started the ready-to-wear line in 1966, and opened the first shop in Paris in 1974, followed by stores in New York and London. Walter Steiger junior is primarily responsible for the growth and success of the brand.

In 1966, the director Michelangelo Antonioni, used Steiger's designs in his movie Blow-Up, and Steiger have had collaborations with Ungaro, Nina Ricci, Sonia Rykiel, Chloé, Calvin Klein, Claude Montana, Oscar de la Renta, Kenzo, Alaïa, Karl Lagerfeld and Victoria Beckham.

Since 2019, the company has been run by Walter's daughter Laura, the third generation of the family, and she has launched the new TANK line.
