= Nasir Mazhar =

British fashion designer

Nasir Mazhar is a British fashion designer. He is best recognised for his inventive approaches to sports caps and headwear. Lady Gaga has worn a few of Nasir Mazhar's hats.

== Biography ==
Mazhar was born in East London and brought up in Leytonstone, London, to Turkish Cypriot parents. Once he left school Mazhar began an apprenticeship at Vidal Sassoon. While working in a Brick Lane salon, he started designing headpieces and soon progressed to hats. He recently created the hats for the 2012 Summer Olympics opening ceremony (the clubbing scene), and launched his first full clothing for men and women in his 2013 collection at London Fashion Week.

Mazhar has collaborated with the Welsh designer Paolo Carzana, creating the headwear for Carzana's London Fashion Week collections.
