= Fashion Museum Bath =

Museum of costume in Bath, Somerset, England

Fashion Museum
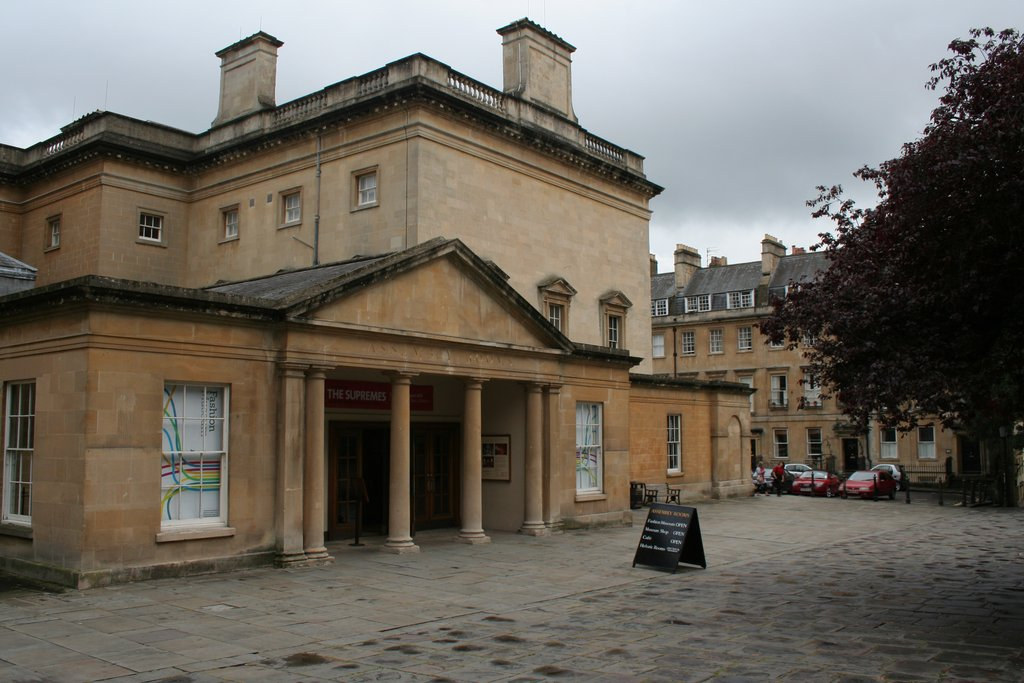

- Location within Somerset and the United Kingdom
- Established: 1963
- Location: Assembly Rooms, Bennett Street, Bath, Somerset, BA1 2QH
- Coordinates: 51.3862°N 2.3624°W
- Website: www.fashionmuseum.co.uk

The Fashion Museum (known before 2007 as the Museum of Costume) was housed in the Assembly Rooms in Bath, Somerset, England.

The collection was started by Doris Langley Moore, who gave her collection of costumes to the city of Bath in 1963. The museum focuses on fashionable dress for men, women and children from the late 16th century to the present day, and has more than 100,000 objects. The earliest pieces are embroidered shirts and gloves from c. 1600. The museum receives about 100,000 visitors annually.

== Dress of the Year ==
Every year from its creation in 1963, an independent fashion expert has been asked to select a dress for entry into this part of the collection. The designers whose work is represented include: Mary Quant, John Bates, Ossie Clark, Jean Muir, Bill Gibb, Giorgio Armani, John Galliano, Ralph Lauren, Alexander McQueen, Donatella Versace and Alber Elbaz.

== Location ==
In 2019, the National Trust, who owns the Assembly Rooms, exercised a break clause in the museum's contract to make room for a new museum about Georgian Bath. The museum announced that it would leave the Assembly Rooms in March 2023 and look for a new building.

The new site chosen was the Old Post Office in Bath; whilst work was undertaken to ready the new location, the collection was temporarily housed and displayed at the headquarters of luxury glovemakers, Dents in Warminster.
