= Bond (surname) =

Bond is a surname of English origin. It was derived from the Old Norse (or rather, Icelandic) Bóndi, meaning 'farmer' or 'husbandman'. These Bóndi were generally considered the core of Norse/Viking society. This word and personal name evolved into the personal name (and eventually, surname) Bonde with the Norman Conquest of 1066. Notable people with the surname include:

- Bond (1810 cricketer), English first-class cricketer
- Annabelle Bond (born 1969), English mountain climber
- Annie B. Bond (born 1953), American writer
- Arthur J. Bond (1939–2012), American academic
- Ashlee Bond (born 1985), American-Israeli Olympic show jumping rider who competes for Israel
- Brian Bond (1936–2025), British military historian and professor
- Brian Bond (activist) (born 1961), American LGBT rights activist
- Brock Bond (born 1985), American baseball player
- Bruce Bond (born 1954), American poet
- Casey Bond (born 1984), American actor and baseball player
- Cathi Bond, Canadian writer
- Chad Bond (born 1987), Welsh footballer
- Chrystelle Trump Bond, American dancer, choreographer and dance historian
- Colin Bond (born 1942), Australian racing driver
- Colin Bond (footballer) (born 1941), Australian rules footballer
- Dario Bond (born 1961), Italian racing driver
- Darwin Bond (born 1951), American sprinter
- Dennis Bond (1947–2025), English footballer
- Derek Bond (1920–2006), British actor
- Derek Bond (bishop) (1927–2018), English Anglican bishop
- Dick Bond (Kansas politician) (1935–2020), American politician
- Douglas Bond (born 1958), American writer
- Eddie Bond (1933–2013), American musician
- Eleanor Bond (born 1948), Canadian artist
- Elizabeth Bond (born 1942), Australian broadcaster
- Eric Bond, (born 1953), American economist
- Etta Bond (born 1989), English singer
- Felicia Bond (born 1954), American writer
- Frederick Bond (naturalist) (1811–1889), English naturalist
- Frederick Bligh Bond (1864–1945), English architect
- Gemma Bond (born 1982), English ballet dancer
- Gerald Bond (1909–1965), South African cricketer
- Gordon C. Bond (1939–1997), American historian
- Graeme Bond (born 1949), Australian rules footballer
- Graham Bond (1937–1974), English musician
- Grahame Bond (born 1943), Australian actor
- Grant Bond (born 1974), American comics artist and writer
- Gwenda Bond (born 1976), American writer
- Hamish Bond (born 1986), New Zealand rower
- Helen Bond, British historian
- Iain Bond (born 1973), English cricketer
- Isaiah Bond (born 2004), American football player
- Jack Bond (1932–2019), English cricketer
- Jacki Bond, English singer
- Jackson Bond (born 1996), American actor
- Jamie Bond (footballer) (born 1971), Australian rules footballer
- Jason Bond, American biologist
- Jennie Bond (born 1950), English journalist and television presenter
- Jay Bond (c. 1885–1955), American college sports coach
- Johanna Bond, American law professor and academic administrator
- Jonathan Bond (born 1993), English footballer
- Julian Bond (1940–2015), American social activist
- Justin Vivian Bond (born 1963), American singer-songwriter
- Jy Bond (born 1979), American football player
- Kerry Bond (1945–2018), Canadian ice hockey player
- Kit Bond (1939–2025), American politician
- Langhorne Bond (1937–2022), Administrator of the U.S. Federal Aviation Administration
- Larry Bond (born 1952), American writer and video game designer
- LaToya Bond (born 1984), American women's basketball player
- LeBron Bond (born 2007), American football player
- Len Bond (born 1954), English footballer
- Lewis Bond (born 2003), American football player
- Liam Bond (born 1970), Welsh golfer
- Linda Bond (born 1946), former General of The Salvation Army
- Lloyd Bond, American psychologist
- Luke Bond, British organist
- Maisie Bond (born 2007), British diver
- Nancy Bond (born 1945), American writer
- Nigel Bond (born 1965), English snooker player
- Nola Bond, New Zealand sprinter
- Oliver Bond (died 1798), Irish revolutionary
- Patrick Bond (born 1961), American economist
- Phil Bond (born 1954), American basketball player
- Philip Bond (born 1966), British comic book artist
- Philip Bond (actor) (1934–2017), English actor
- Raymond Bond (born 1944), English cricketer
- Robert Bond (1857–1927), Premier of Newfoundland
- Robert Richard Bond (1918–1969), American lawyer
- Rose Bond, Canadian-born American animator
- Ruskin Bond (born 1934), Indian author
- Samantha Bond (born 1961), English actress
- Scott Bond, British record producer
- Sheila Bond (1928–2017), American actress
- Shirley Bond, Canadian politician
- Steve Bond (born 1953), Israeli American actor and model
- Sudie Bond (1928–1984), American actress
- Sue Bond (born 1945), British singer and actress
- Susan G. Bond (born 1942), British scientific researcher and computer programmer
- Tim Bond, New Zealand rugby player
- Timothy Bond (professor), American theater director
- Tony Bond (rugby union) (born 1953), English rugby union player
- Travis Bond (born 1990), American football player
- Troy Bond (born 1973), Australian rules footballer
- Victoria Bond (born 1945), American conductor and composer
- Walt Bond (1937–1967), American baseball player
- Walter Bond (born 1969), American basketball player
- Ward Bond (1903–1960), American actor
- Wayne Bond (born 1986), Papua New Guinean rugby league player
- Bond baronets
  - Sir Thomas Bond, 1st Baronet
  - Sir James Bond, 1st Baronet
- Chelsea Watego (born 1978/1979, formerly Bond), Aboriginal Australian academic and writer

== Disambiguation pages ==
- Alan Bond (disambiguation)
- Andrew Bond (disambiguation)
- Anthony Bond (disambiguation)
- Arthur Bond (disambiguation)
- Charles Bond (disambiguation)
- Christopher Bond (disambiguation)
- David Bond (disambiguation)
- Denis Bond (disambiguation)
- Edward Bond (disambiguation)
- Ernie Bond (disambiguation)
- Francis Bond (disambiguation)
- Frank Bond (disambiguation)
- Frederick Bond (disambiguation)
- George Bond (disambiguation)
- Graham Bond (disambiguation)
- Henry Bond (disambiguation)
- Hugh Bond (disambiguation)
- Jack Bond (disambiguation)
- James Bond (disambiguation)
- John Bond (disambiguation)
- Kevin Bond (disambiguation)
- Mark Bond (disambiguation)
- Michael Bond (disambiguation)
- Richard Bond (disambiguation)
- Samuel Bond (disambiguation)
- Sarah Bond (disambiguation)
- Shane Bond (disambiguation)
- Simon Bond (disambiguation)
- Stanley Bond (disambiguation)
- Stephanie Bond (disambiguation)
- Thomas Bond (disambiguation)
- William Bond (disambiguation)

== See also ==
- Bond family tree showing the relationship between some of the above
