= Linnell =

Linnell is an English surname. People bearing this name include:

- Albert Paul Linnell (1922–2017), American astronomer
- Derek Linnell (born 1968), Canadian ice hockey player
- Francis John Linnell (1892–1944), RAF commander
- Jim Linnell, American leather craftsman
- John Linnell, multiple people including:
  - John Linnell (cabinet maker) (1729–1796), English cabinet-maker
  - John Linnell (painter) (1792–1882), English landscape painter, who was father of:
    - John Linnell the Younger (1821–1906), English botanist
  - John Wycliffe Linnell (1878–1967), British physician
  - John Linnell (born 1959), American rock musician who co-founded the band They Might Be Giants
- Stuart Linnell (born 1947), British broadcaster
