= John Linnell (disambiguation) =

John Linnell (born 1959) is an American musician and a member of the band They Might Be Giants.

John Linnell may also refer to:

- John Linnell (painter) (1792–1882), English landscape and portrait painter, who was father of:
  - John Linnell the Younger (1821–1906), English botanist
- John Linnell (cabinet maker) (1729–1796), English cabinet maker
- John Wycliffe Linnell, British physician

== See also ==
- John Linnell Bond, architect
