= John Bond =

John Bond may refer to:

== Politics ==
- John Bond (MP for Leominster), Member of Parliament (MP) for Leominster in 1402
- John Bond (MP for Coventry), MP for Coventry
- John Bond (1678–1744), British MP for Corfe Castle, 1721–1722
- John Bond (1717–1784), British MP for Corfe Castle, 1727–1761 and 1764–1780
- John Bond (1753–1824), British MP for Corfe Castle, 1780–1801
- John Bond (1802–1844), British MP for Corfe Castle, 1823–1828

== Science ==
- John Bond (classicist) (1550–1612), English classical scholar, physician and Member of Parliament
- John Bond (physicist) (born 1956), English forensic scientist
- Dick Bond (astrophysicist) (John Richard Bond, born 1950), Canadian astrophysicist and cosmologist

== Sport ==
- John Bond (American football coach) (born 1962), American football coach
- John Bond (footballer) (1932–2012), English footballer and club manager
- John Bond (quarterback) (born 1961), American football quarterback
- John Bond (rugby league) (1931–2024), New Zealand rugby league player
- Jack Bond (cricketer) (John David Bond, 1932–2019), English cricketer
- John Kerry Bond (1945–2018), Canadian ice hockey forward
- John Bond (rugby union) (1892–1963), Australian rugby union player

== Others ==
- John Bond (banker) (born 1941), British banker with HSBC and company chairman, Chairman of Vodafone
- John Bond (jurist) (1612–1676), Master of Trinity Hall, Cambridge and Professor of Law at Gresham College
- John Adikes Bond (born 1955), American author, writer, poker player
- John James Bond (1810–1883), English chronologist
- John Bond (judge) (born 1960), judge of the Supreme Court of Queensland, Australia
- John Linnell Bond (1764–1837), English architect
- John Bond (priest) (born 1945), Dean of Connor
- John Bond Jr. (1770–1862), American military officer, Mississippi pioneer and legislator
- Johnny Bond (1915–1978), American country music singer
