= Thomas Bond =

Thomas Bond may refer to:

- Thomas Bond (British surgeon) (1841–1901), British surgeon
- Thomas Bond (American physician) (1712–1784), American physician and surgeon
- Thomas Bond (topographer) (1765–1837), British topographical writer
- Thomas Bond Walker (1861–1933), Irish painter
- Tommy Bond (1926–2005), American actor
- Tommy Bond (baseball) (1856–1941), Irish-born Major League Baseball pitcher
- Sir Thomas Bond, 1st Baronet (died 1685), English aristocrat and property developer
- Sir Thomas Bond, 3rd Baronet (1709–1734), of the Bond baronets
- Sir Thomas Bond, 2nd Baronet (1776–1823), of the Bond baronets
- Thomas Bonde, MP for Malmesbury
- Thomas Bond (MP for Coventry) for Coventry (UK Parliament constituency)
- Thomas Hinckley Bond (1804–1882), New York and Connecticut politician

== See also ==
- Bond (disambiguation)
