= General Bond =

General Bond may refer to:

- Charles Bond (pilot) (1915–2009), U.S. Air Force major general
- Henry Bond (British Army officer) (1873–1919), British Army brigadier general
- Lionel Bond (1884–1961), British Army lieutenant general
- Robert M. Bond (1929–1984), U.S. Air Force lieutenant general
- William R. Bond (1918–1970), U.S. Army brigadier general

== See also ==
- Thord Bonde (1900–1969), Swedish Army general
- General obligation bond, a common type of municipal bond in the United States
