= George Bond (mayor) =

English politician

Sir George Bond (1534 – 1592) was a 16th-century English politician who served as Lord Mayor of London in 1587/8. A native of Somerset, he was the younger son of William Bond of Buckland and younger brother of William Bond, alderman and Sheriff of London. He was a member of the Haberdasher's Company. Prior to becoming mayor, he was elected as Sheriff of London in 1579 and alderman of Walbrook in 1584. At the time of his election in 1587, the usual Mayoral Feast was cancelled, on account of plague within the city of London.

Sir George Bond married Winifred Leigh, the daughter of another Lord Mayor, Sir Thomas Leigh. Among his children were Thomas Bond, MP for Launceston and Southampton, and William Bond, alderman, whose grandson Thomas was the first of the Bond Baronets of Peckham. He died in 1592 and was buried in the Mercers' Chapel. His daughter, Dionise, 1565-1609 married Sir Henry Winston. Their daughter, Sarah married John Churchill. John & Sarah were the grandparents of John Churchill, 1st Duke of Marlborough and they are also the direct ancestors of Sir Winston Churchill, the British war time leader, d 1965, and Princess Diana Spencer of Wales.

After his death, his widow married John Colles of Barton Grange, Corfe, Somerset, MP for Minehead.

Civic offices
Preceded by George Barne	Lord Mayor of London; 1587–1588	Succeeded by Martin Calthorpe
