= James Bond (disambiguation) =

James Bond is a media franchise based on the fictional British Secret Service agent created in 1953 by writer Ian Fleming.

James Bond may also refer to:

== In Ian Fleming fiction ==
- James Bond (literary character), information about the literary character
- Portrayal of James Bond in film, information about various portrayals of the character in films
  - James Bond (Daniel Craig), information about the reimagined film character portrayed by Daniel Craig
- Inspirations for James Bond, the people who Ian Fleming used as an inspiration for James Bond
- Production of the James Bond films, for production background of the film series
- List of James Bond films, for plot synopses, awards, and box office information for each film in the series
- Motifs in the James Bond film series, the motifs that appear in the series of Bond films
- James Bond (games), the series of video and computer games based on the character and the film series
- James Bond music, the music for the James Bond movies
- James Bond comic strips
- James Bond (comics)
- "James Bond Theme", the main theme for the James Bond movies
- James Bond (Dynamite Entertainment), a spy thriller comic book line

== Gaming ==
- James Bond in video games
- James Bond 007 (role-playing game), a 1983 table-top role-playing game published by Victory Games
- James Bond 007 (1984 video game), published by Parker Brothers
- James Bond 007: The Duel, a 1992 video game for the Sega Genesis
- James Bond 007 (1998 video game), published by Nintendo for the Game Boy

== Other fictional characters ==
- James Bond Jr., the fictional character's nephew.
- Jimmy Bond (The Lone Gunmen), a fictional character on The X-Files spin-off TV series, The Lone Gunmen
- James Pond, a secret agent fish on the 1990 video game James Pond: Underwater Agent
- James Bond, a character in Agatha Christie's The Rajah's Emerald

== People ==
- H. James Bond, thoroughbred racehorse trainer and three-time winner of the Saratoga Breeders' Cup Handicap
- James Bond (American football) (1894–1956), former coach of the Buffalo Bulls college football team
- James Bond (Canadian football) (born 1949), CFL player with the Calgary Stampeders
- James Bond (naval officer) (1945–2016), Royal Australian Navy officer
- James Bond (ornithologist) (1900–1989), author of Birds of the West Indies, whose name was borrowed by Fleming for the character
- James Bond (speedway rider) (born 1938), British motorcycle speedway rider
- James Bond (priest) (1785–1829), Irish Anglican priest
- James Bond III (born 1966), American actor and director of Def by Temptation
- Sir James Bond, 1st Baronet (1744–1820), Irish MP
- James A. C. Bond (1844–1930), justice of the Maryland Court of Appeals
- James Henry Robinson Bond (1871–1943), British soldier
- James Bond Kamwambi (1967–2021), Malawian politician
- James Bond Stockdale (1923–2005), US Navy officer, thinker, and political candidate
- Jim Bond (rugby league), New Zealand rugby league international
- Jim Bond (born 1936), American minister
- Jimmy Bond (musician) (1933–2012), American jazz and session musician
- Terance James Bond (1946–2023), British painter of birds

== Other uses ==
- 9007 James Bond, an asteroid (or minor planet) named after the character
- James Bond (1999 film), a Malayalam language comedy film
- James Bond (2015 film), a Telugu language film
- St. James-Bond Church, Toronto
- James Bond (card game), a matching card game

== See also ==
- Jamie Bond (born 1971), Australian rules footballer
