= Arthur Bond =

Arthur Bond may refer to:

- Arthur J. Bond (1939–2012), American academic
- Arthur D. Bond (1902–1983), American football player
- Arthur James F. Bond (1888–1958), English artist
