= George Bond =

George Bond may refer to:

- George Bond (pirate) (fl. 1683–1684), English pirate in the Caribbean
- George Edward Bond (1853 –1914), British architect
- George Bond (footballer) (1910–1982), English professional footballer
- George Allan Bond, founder of Bonds (clothing) in Australia
- George John Bond (1850–1933), Canadian Methodist minister and missionary
- George Phillips Bond (1825–1865), American astronomer
- George H. Bond (1873–1954), head coach of the Syracuse college football program, 1894
- George Hawkesworth Bond (1845–1891), British MP for East Dorset, 1886–1891
- George F. Bond (1915–1983), US Navy doctor and "father of saturation diving"
- George W. Bond (1891–1974), president of Louisiana Tech University, 1928–1936
- George Harwell Bond (1891–1952), American architect
- George Bond (mayor) (1534–1592), Lord Mayor of London
