= Haynes King =

Haynes King may refer to:

- Haynes King (painter) (1831–1904), English genre painter
- Haynes King (American football) (born 2001), American football quarterback
