= Henry Bond (disambiguation) =

Henry Bond (born 1966) is an English writer, photographer, and visual artist.

Henry Bond may also refer to:

- Henry Bond (physician) (1801–1883), British physician and academic
- Henry Bond (Master of Trinity Hall, Cambridge) (1853–1938), British academic
- Henry Whitelaw Bond (1848–1919), Missouri Supreme Court justice
- Henry Bond (British Army officer) (1873–1919), Irish cricketer and British Army officer
- Sir Henry Bond, 2nd Baronet (died 1721), English Jacobite and politician
- Henry Stanley Bond (1876-1954), 8th Commandant of the North Borneo Armed Constabulary
