= Graham Bond (disambiguation) =

Graham Bond (1937–1974) was an English musician

Graham, Graeme or Grahame Bond may also refer to:

- Graham Bond (footballer) (1932–1998), English footballer
- Graham Bond (gymnast) (1937–2018), Australian Olympic gymnast
- Graeme Bond (born 1949), Australian rules footballer and radio commentator
- Graeme Bond (rugby union) (born 1974), Australian rugby union player
- Grahame Bond (born 1943), Australian actor, writer, director, musician and composer, known primarily for his role as Aunty Jack.
