= Anthony Bond =

Anthony or Tony Bond may refer to:

== Sports ==
- Tony Bond (footballer, born 1888), English footballer
- Tony Bond (footballer, born 1913) (1913–1991), English footballer
- Tony Bond (rugby union) (1953–2025), English rugby union player

== Fictional characters ==
- Anthony Bond, character in Afraid of Love (film)
- Tony Bond, character in Afraid of Love (film)
