= Andrew Bond =

Andrew Bond may refer to:

- Andy Bond (businessman) (born 1965), former chief executive officer of Asda
- Andrew Bond, founder of Bond Electraglide
- Andrew Bond, father of James Bond and a character in SilverFin
- Andrew Bond (cricketer) (born 1978), Australian cricketer
- Andy Bond (footballer) (born 1986), English footballer
- Andrew Bond (rugby union)
