= Edward Mann (designer) =

London-based hatmaker

Edward Mann was a London-based hatmaker and milliner popular in the second half of the 20th century.

While Mann was working as a milliner in the 1950s, he became particularly known for his creative 1960s designs, such as designs with incorporated pockets and lace baby-bonnet-style caps. In 1967 he produced a collection inspired by the Common Market, which was shown in Germany as well as in London, and presented on models from across Europe. He was also the designer of the hats worn by Diana Rigg as Emma Peel in the 1960s TV series The Avengers. This led to Mann becoming, briefly, one of the most desirable milliners in London at that time. In 1967, one of Mann's hats was chosen by Felicity Green of The Daily Mirror as part of her Dress of the Year selection for the Fashion Museum, Bath. The hat was made to match an orange and pink striped trouser suit by David Bond for Slimma. In the mid-1970s Edward Mann owned a clothing brand called Buckle Under. By 1982, the Edward Mann company operated as a concessionary brand, selling its hats through eighteen department stores and other retailers, rather than having their own shops.
