= David Bond Walker =

Irish painter (1891–1977)

- Born: 6 December 1891; Belfast, Ireland
- Died: 9 January 1977 (aged 85)
- Known for: Painting
- Parent: Thomas Bond Walker

David Bond Walker (6 December 1891 - 9 January 1977) was an Irish portrait and landscape painter.

== Life ==
David Bond Walker was born in Belfast on 6 December 1891. His father was the artist, Thomas Bond Walker. His mother died when Walker was young, and he was raised by his father. His father also taught painting with Paul Henry being his most famous pupil. Walker attended St Jude's National School, Belfast. He studied art under his father and Hans Iten, having begun to paint at age 14. Iten advised that he concentrate on portraiture, and in 1920 four of his portraits were exhibited at the Belfast Art Society. That year, Walker had been selected by John Lavery as one of the first group of 10 members of the Belfast Art Society.

In 1921, he began exhibiting with the Royal Hibernian Academy. Over the next five years he exhibited 8 works, 4 of which were portraits. In the 1930s, he received commissions for a number of portraits including Sir Joseph Davison, Lord Justice Best, Sir Ernest Herman, George Borrow, and Robert Hugh Henderson.

Walker moved to Newcastle, County Down during World War II, working in a cottage between Dinnewater and the Silent Valley on the Head Road. He opened the Bond Walker Gallery at Pedlar's Bridge, Dinnewater, and taught art at Mourne Grange School, Kilkeel and evening classes in Rathfriland.

Walker died on 9 January 1977. Examples of Walker's works are held in the collections of the Ulster Museum, the Armagh County Museum, and the National Trust.
