= Edith Mabel Gabriel =

British artist

- Born: 1882; Richmond, London
- Died: 1972 (aged 89–90); London, England
- Education: Heatherley School of Fine Art
- Known for: Sculpture

Edith Mabel Gabriel (1882-1972) was a British sculptor.

== Biography ==
Gabriel was born in England at Richmond and studied at the Heatherley School of Fine Art in London and then in Paris. Her sculptures were classical in style and she regularly exhibited in Paris from 1925 onwards, often at the Salon des Artistes Francais. Her sculpture Mother and Child featured in the 1939 volume Modern British Sculpture published by the Royal Society of British Sculptors. Gabriel eventually became a fellow of the Society. As well as in Paris, she exhibited at the Royal Academy, the Royal Scottish Academy, the Royal Glasgow Institute of the Fine Arts and at the Walker Art Gallery in Liverpool. Gabriel died in London, where she had rented a studio in Hampstead since 1915.
