= Heatherley School of Fine Art =

Art school in London, England

Coordinates: 51.4787°N 0.1847°W

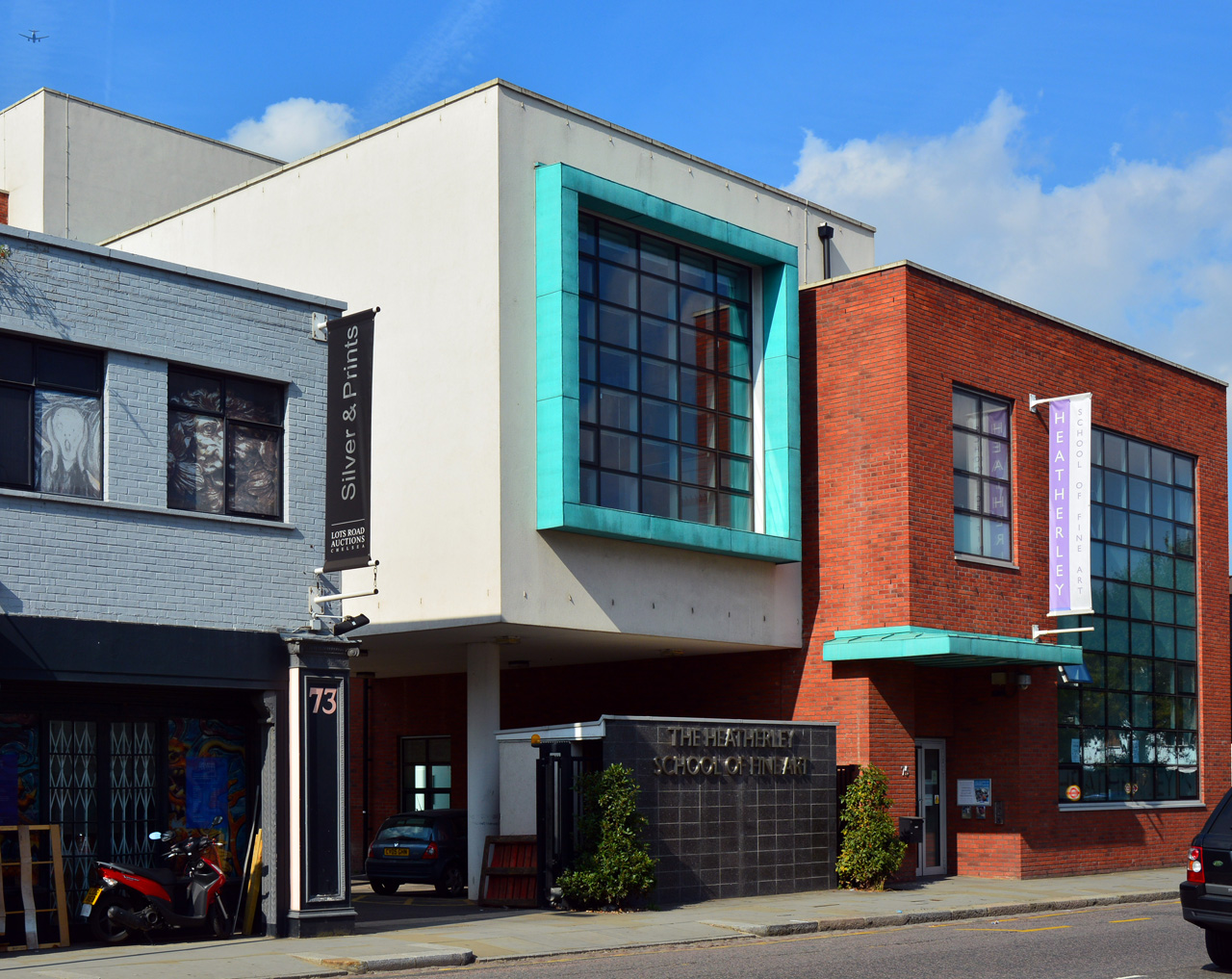
The Heatherley School of Art, Lots Road

The Heatherley School of Fine Art is an independent art school in London.

The school was named after Thomas Heatherley who took over as the school's principal from James Mathews Leigh (when it was named "Leigh's"). Founded in 1845, the school is affectionately known as Heatherleys. It is one of the oldest independent art schools in London and is among the few art colleges in Britain that focus on portraiture, figurative painting and sculpture.

It opened a new school, on George Street (off Baker Street), London, in November 1927 after previously being located on Newman Street. In 2008 the school moved to a purpose designed building in Lots Road, Chelsea.

== Alumni ==
- Evelyn Abelson
- Adebanji Alade
- Edith Lovell Andrews
- Sybil Andrews
- Mabel Lucie Attwell
- Michael Ayrton
- Nicolas Bentley
- Daisy Radcliffe Beresford
- Anna Blunden
- Arthur James F. Bond
- Gregoire Boonzaier
- Henry Alexander Bowler
- Dorothea Braby
- Angela Brazil
- Dorothy Burroughes
- George Francis Carline
- Hugh Carter
- Victor Child
- Joseph Clark
- Jensine Costello
- Gladys Dawson
- William Russell Flint
- Edith Mabel Gabriel
- Sir Alfred Gilbert
- Caroline Gotch
- Alec Carruthers Gould
- Andrew Carrick Gow
- Mary Gow
- Kate Greenaway
- John Martin Harvey
- Claude Hayes
- Edward Robert Hughes
- Edward Burne Jones
- Haynes King
- Edmund Leighton
- Frederic, Lord Leighton
- James Le Jeune
- Elyse Ashe Lord
- John Everett Millais
- Iain Macnab
- William Snell Morrish
- Margaret Graeme Niven
- Dennis H. Osborne
- George John Pinwell
- Edward Poynter
- A. R. Quinton
- Henrietta Rae
- Hazel Reeves
- Frank Reynolds
- Dante Gabriel Rossetti
- Adolfine Mary Ryland
- Henry Ryland
- Frank O. Salisbury
- John Scott
- E. H. Shepard
- Frank Sherwin
- Walter Sickert
- Solomon Joseph Solomon
- Steven Spurrier
- George E. Studdy
- Margaret Tarrant
- Albert Chevallier Tayler
- Elizabeth Thompson Butler
- Clive Uptton
- Frederick Arthur Verner
- Billie Waters
- Evelyn Waugh
- Walter Wright
