= Gladys Dawson =

British artist (1909–1993)

- Born: 1909; Castleton, Greater Manchester, England
- Died: 1993 (aged 83–84)
- Education: Heatherley's School of Art
- Known for: Painting, illustration

Gladys Dawson (1909-1993) later Gladys Woodruff, was a British artist known as a painter and illustrator of children's books.

== Biography ==
Dawson was born in Castleton in Rochdale and, after a private school education, she attended Heatherley's School of Art from 1936 to 1939. After graduation, Dawson worked as a commercial artist for a number of different clients. She created fabric designs for both the Liberty department store in London and for the Courtaulds textile company, as well as greeting cards for Raphael Tuck & Sons and also book jackets. As a painter Dawson produced watercolours of British historic buildings including castles and windmills and also of British birds and wildlife. She had solo exhibitions at Colwyn Bay in 1947 and 1954, in Trinidad in 1954, in Kenya 1963 and at Bourne Hall in Epsom in 1974. Dawson's work was also exhibited at the Royal Institution and the Walker Art Gallery in Liverpool. She was elected an associate member of the Royal Cambrian Academy in 1943. Three years later she was elected a full member of the academy. In 1952 she became a fellow of the Royal Society of Arts.

From the early 1950s, Dawson was active in the Society of Women Artists, being elected an associate member in 1953 and a full member in 1955. She served as the Society's president from 1982 to 1985.
