= Northern Voice =

- Frequency: Annual
- Locations: Vancouver, British Columbia, Canada
- Years active: 2005-2013
- Budget: Non-Profit
- Organizer: Northern Voice Conference Societ
- Website: northernvoice.ca

Northern Voice was an annual blogging, social software and online communities conference held in Vancouver, British Columbia, Canada from 2005 to 2013. The conference was organized by members of the Vancouver blogging community, who attempted to keep the event accessible to as many people as possible. Keynote speakers at Northern Voice included Anil Dash (then of Six Apart), Matt Mullenweg of WordPress, Nora Young of CBC Radio, Chris Messina, April Smith and Chris Wilson.

Northern Voice events:

- Northern Voice 2005 - February 19, 2005
- Northern Voice 2006 - February 11 and 12, 2006
- Northern Voice 2007 - February 23 and 24, 2007
- Northern Voice 2008 - February 22 and 23, 2008
- Northern Voice 2009 - February 20 and 21, 2009
- Northern Voice 2010 - May 7 and 8, 2010
- Northern Voice 2011 - May 13 and 14, 2011
- Northern Voice 2012 - June 15 and 16, 2012
- Northern Voice 2013 - June 14 and 15, 2013

== About Northern Voice ==
The idea for a Canadian blogging conference was first mentioned on Darren Barefoot's blog in March 2004.

Conference organizers included Darren Barefoot, Kris Krug, Brian Lamb, Cyprien Lomas, Boris Mann, James Sherret, Travis Smith, Julie Szabo, Roland Tanglao, Lauren Wood, Dale McGladdery, Shane Birley, Allyson McGrane, and Jonathon Narvey.

Northern Voice started as a one-day event, held on Saturdays. In 2007, a second day was added, for an unconference known as Moose Camp.

Discussion topics included "how blogging interacts with family life, education, travel, photography, community building and establishing professional profiles."
