= Denis Bond =

Denis Bond may refer to:

- Denis Bond (writer) (born 1946), British children's author
- Denis Bond (President of the Council) (died 1658), English politician who was a member and later president of Cromwell's Council of State
- Denis Bond (MP) (1676–1747), English Member of Parliament for Corfe Castle, Dorchester and Poole

== See also ==
- Dennis Bond (1947–2025), English footballer
