= Charles Bond =

Charles Bond may refer to:

- Sir Charles Bond, 4th Baronet (1734–1767), of the Bond baronets
- Charles Henry Bond (1846–1908), American businessman who was president and general manager of Waitt & Bond
- Charles John Bond (1856–1939), British doctor
- Sir Hubert Bond (Charles Hubert Bond, 1870–1945), British psychiatrist and mental health administrator
- Charles Anson Bond (1873–1943), American businessman and 37th mayor of Columbus, Ohio
- Charles G. Bond (1877–1974), United States Representative from New York
- Chuck Bond (1914–1989), American football player
- Charles Bond (pilot) (1915–2009), aviator and member of the American Volunteer Group
- Derek Bond (bishop) (Charles Derek Bond, 1927–2018), Church of England bishop, bishop of Bradwell, 1976–1993
