= David Bond =

David Bond may refer to:

- David P. Bond (1951–2020), Journalist, historian and author
- David Bond (sailor) (1922–2013), British sailor and Olympic Champion
- David Bond (journalist), British sports journalist
- David Bond (designer), British fashion designer and historian
- David Bond (actor) (1914–1989), American actor, known for The Stranger
