= David Bond (designer) =

English fashion designer

David Bond is an English fashion designer who was known for his trouser suits in the 1960s (one of which was chosen as Dress of the Year in 1967). Since the 1980s he has also written several books on fashion and design history.

Bond was born close to Wales, in the area that would become Merseyside, and won a scholarship to the Royal College of Art, where he was one of Janey Ironside's first students. He then went on to become a designer for Slimma, a middle-market brand originally founded in 1935. Under the Slimma Group One label, Bond gained a reputation for his "Total Look" of tight, slender tailoring, often in elasticated fabrics, which was modelled by Twiggy for the fashion press.

In 1967 the fashion journalist Felicity Green was asked by the Fashion Museum, Bath to choose the most representative look for that year for their Dress of the Year collection. Green worked for the Daily Mirror, and wanted to pick something that reflected the type of quality ready-to-wear clothing available from good department stores anywhere in the country, rather than expensive high-end clothing that the average Mirror reader could never afford. She had also noticed that trouser ensembles were increasingly accepted in a wider range of contexts, and therefore, chose Bond's slim-cut orange, pink and yellow striped trousers, jacket and blouse for the Slimma label. The shoes were made by Saxone, also a widely known and accessible High Street brand, although the hat was a custom one-off design by Edward Mann. 1967 marked the first time that the Dress of the Year was widely reported in the British fashion press, with Green contributing a significant article for the Mirror discussing her decision to select something that did not include an actual dress. The Adel Rootstein mannequin selected to model the look represented the African-American model Donyale Luna.

In 1976 Bond designed and presented his first collection for Craftcentre Wales, an organisation founded by David Lewis and based in Porthmadog, North Wales to specialise in Welsh-produced artisan goods. Although he was not Welsh, Bond had close links to North Wales due to regular childhood holidays there, and loved working with natural fibres and traditional Welsh textiles. The Craftcentre designs were made up from exclusive fabrics woven in Penmachno in a conscious effort to preserve the dying skills of the village craftspeople. During the 1980s he became an author, publishing several books on the history of fashion and design.

== Bibliography ==
- Bond, David (1984). The Guinness guide to 20th century homes. Middlesex: Guinness. ISBN 9780851124131.
- Bond, David (1988). The Guinness guide to 20th century fashion. Middlesex: Guinness. ISBN 9780851123561.
- Bond, David (1992). Glamour in fashion. Enfield: Guinness. ISBN 9780851125169.
- Bond, David (1994). Coco Chanel and Chanel. Watford: Exley. ISBN 1850154821.
