= Edith Lovell Andrews =

British artist (1886–1980)

- Born: 7 November 1886; Newport, Wales
- Died: 1980 (aged 93–94); Camborne, Cornwall
- Education: Worcester School of Art; Glasgow School of Art; Heatherley's School of Art
- Known for: Painter, Decorative artist

Edith Lovell Andrews (7 November 1886 – 1980) was a Welsh painter and decorative artist.

== Biography ==
Andrews was born in Newport in Monmouthshire and was educated at the Forest Gate Collegiate School. She studied at the Worcester School of Art from 1903 to 1907 and then at the Glasgow School of Art for two years before attending Heatherley's School of Art in London until 1914. She painted landscapes and flower subjects in watercolours and tempera. Andrews also produced posters in tempera, decorative lettering and works on vellum.

Andrews exhibited extensively in international shows, in Canada and in Stockholm and Turin, and also in Britain, notably at St Ives where she lived. She was elected a member of the St Ives Society of Artists and had a solo exhibition in 1957. The British Museum holds examples of her work.
