= Henry Ryland =

British painter

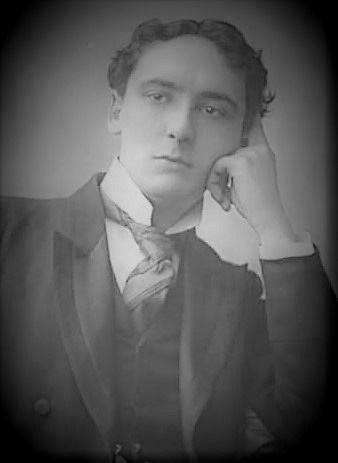
Henry Ryland

Henry Ryland (1856–1924) was a British painter, book illustrator, decorator and designer. He was the son of John Benjamin and Elizabeth Ryland and was born in Biggleswade, Bedfordshire in 1856.

He studied in London at the South Kensington Art School, and at Heatherley's. He also studied in Paris under Jean-Joseph Benjamin-Constant, and at the Académie Julian under Gustave Boulanger and Lefebvre.

He exhibited at the Grosvenor Gallery, and from 1890 at the Royal Academy. He also was a regular exhibiter at the New Gallery and the Royal Institute of Painters in Water Colours (formerly the New Society of Painters in Water Colours). He became a full member of the latter institution.

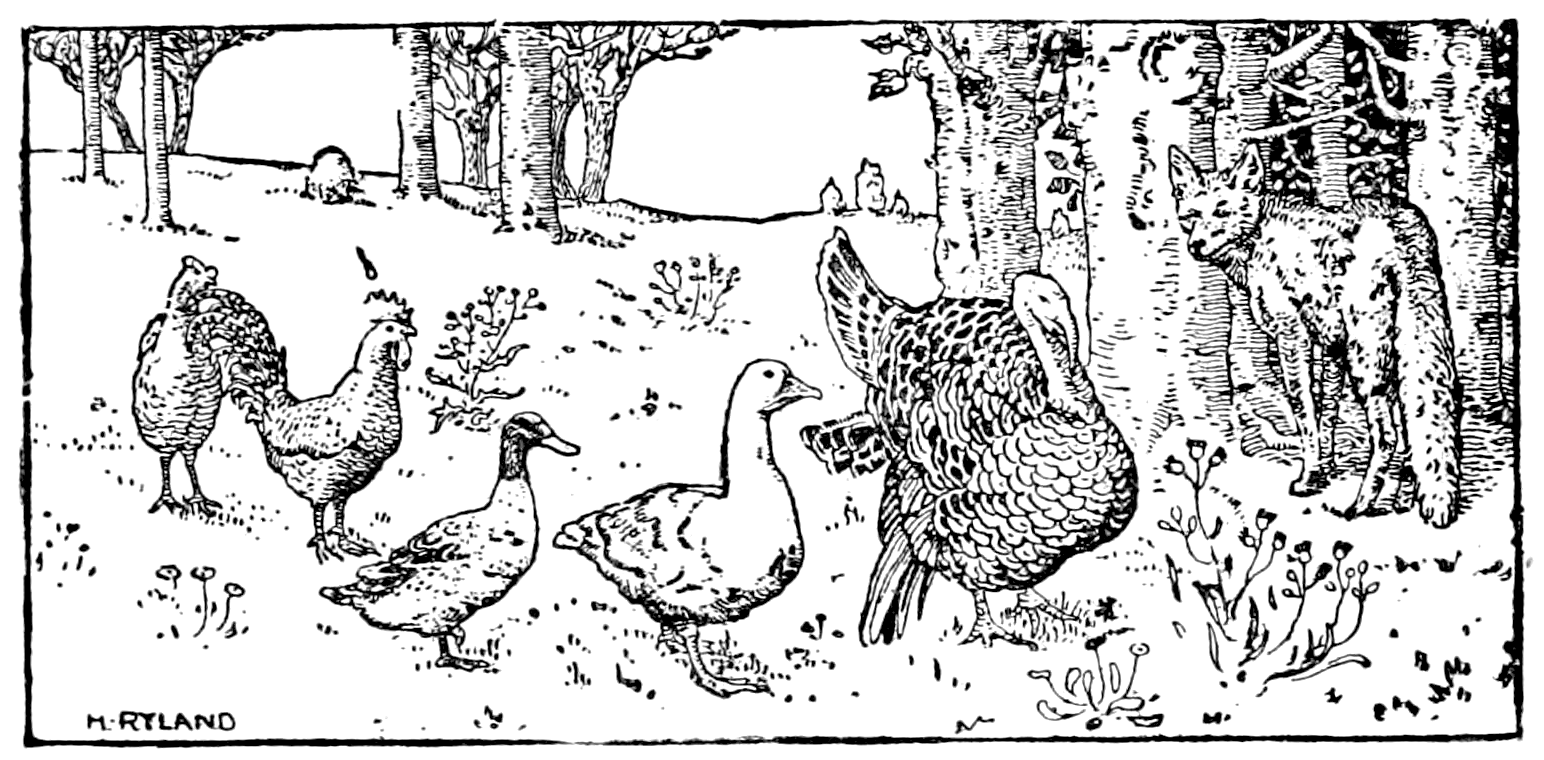
Illustration in English Fairy Tales, for "Henny-Penny"

Although he did paint in oils, he specialized in highly finished watercolour paintings containing images of young women in classical draperies on marble terraces. Subjects of this type were popularized by Lawrence Alma-Tadema, Albert Moore and J. W. Godward. Unlike Moore he rarely painted nudes. His watercolours were widely reproduced as prints.

Ryland also designed stained glass and his woodcuts were used in a number of magazines, including the English Illustrated Magazine in the 1880s and 1890s.

In 1901 he married Mabel Louise Mann and had one son and one daughter. In 1911 he was living at 32 Fairfax Road, Bedford Park, London, according to Who's Who. He died on 23 November 1924.

== Influences and style ==
Ryland's style mixed themes and subjects from the very different spheres of the Neo-Classical and Pre-Raphaelite movements. His influences include Puvis de Chavanne and Alma-Tadema. Ryland is recognised as the foremost of the neo-classical painters working in watercolour, and is frequently exhibited at the Royal Academy.

== Gallery ==
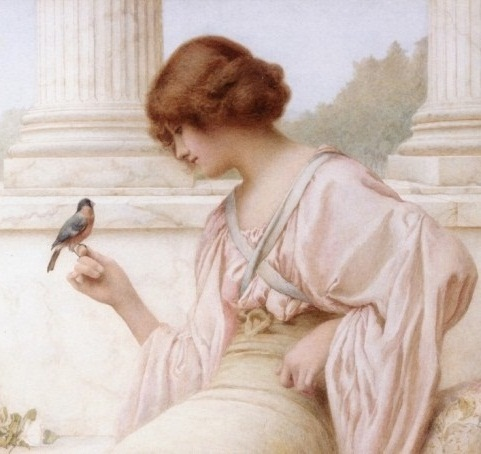
The Captives Return, circa 1890

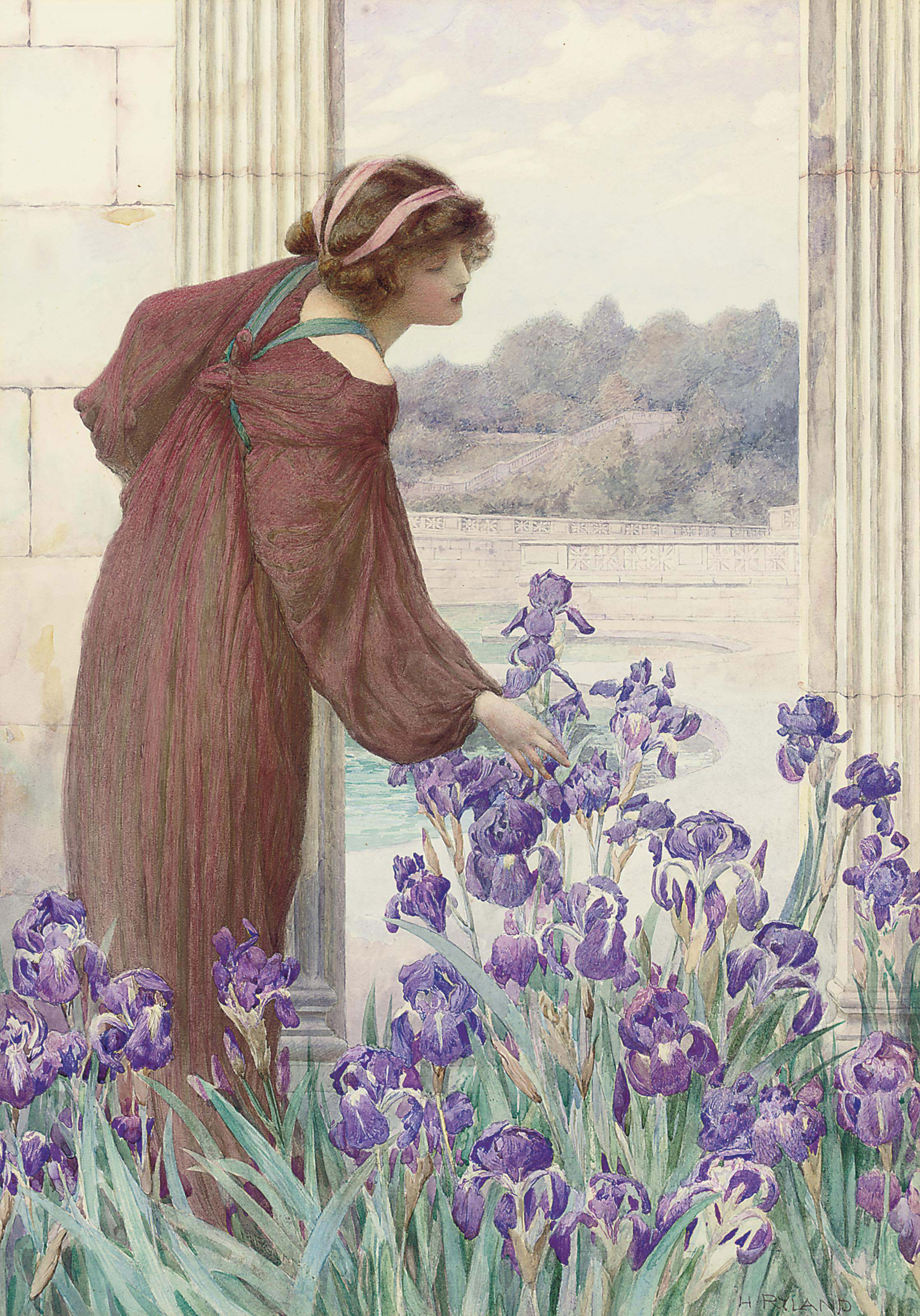
An Allegory of Spring

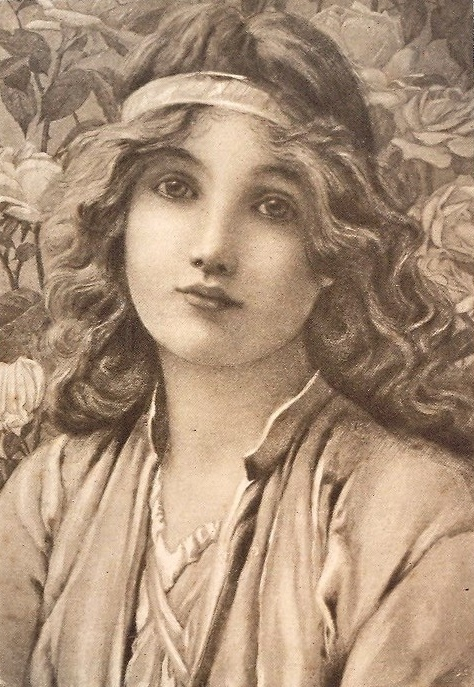
Summer, 1890

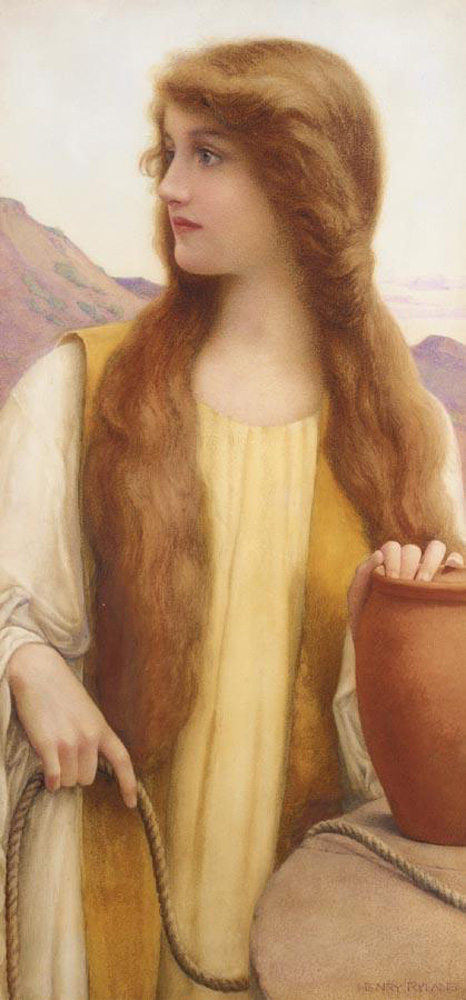
Rachel at the Well, 1890

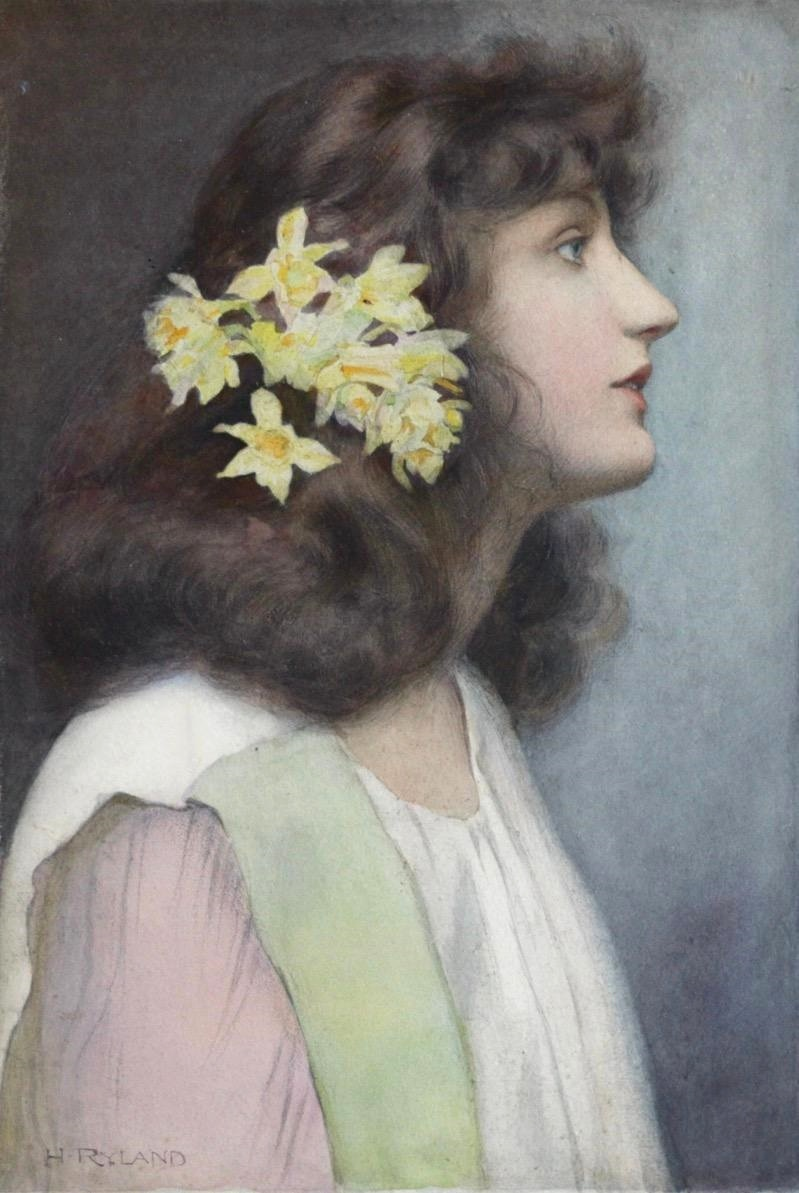
Asphodel

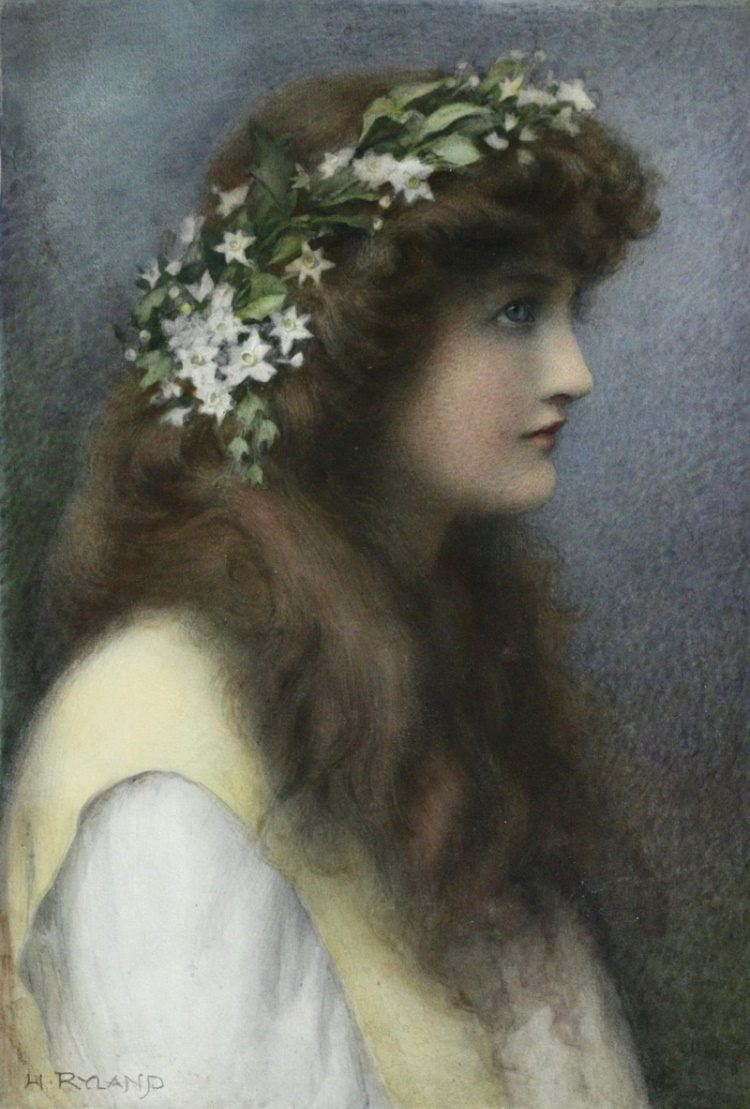
Campaspe
