= Nora Young =

Canadian broadcaster and writer

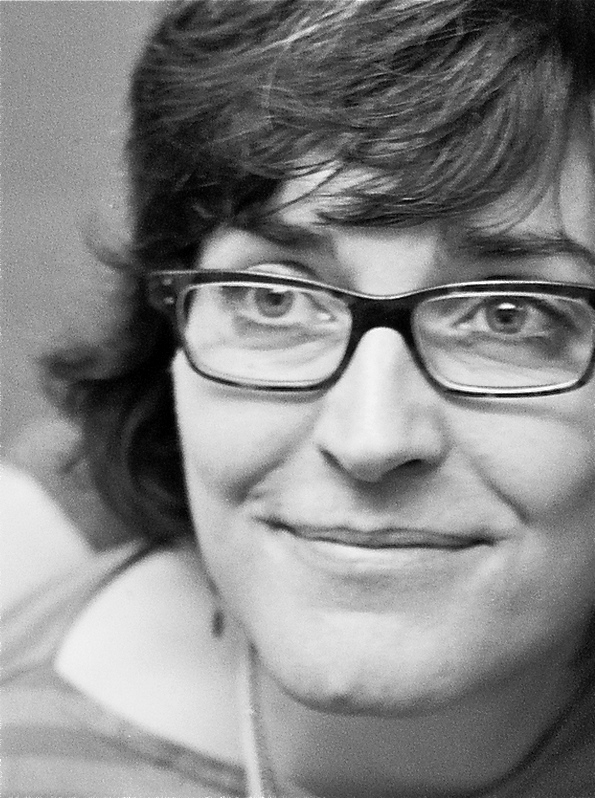
- Young in February 2009
- Presenting career
- Show: Spark
- Network: CBC Radio One
- Website: norayoung.ca

Nora Young is a Canadian broadcaster and writer. She was the first host of CBC Radio's Definitely Not the Opera, from 1994 to 2002. From 2007 to 2024, she was the host of Spark on CBC Radio One; after the conclusion of that program, she continued as a technology reporter for the CBC until her retirement in August 2026.

Nora Young was born and raised in Toronto. She earned an MA in political science from McGill University. In the early 1990s, she worked as a freelance commentator for CBC Radio's new program Brand X, aimed at younger listeners from Generation X. Brand X was cancelled after its first season and was replaced by Definitely Not The Opera (nicknamed DNTO) in 1994. Young was hired as the first host of DNTO, and relocated to Winnipeg where it was recorded. When it began, DNTO was a four-hour magazine-style program about pop culture, aimed at a slightly older audience than Brand X had targeted. In September 2002, Young was replaced by Sook-Yin Lee as host.

In September 2007, Young, Elizabeth Bowie, Tom Howell, and Dan Misener launched Spark on CBC Radio One. The show, which Young hosts, focuses on "the way technology affects our lives, and the world around us". The show utilizes a unique format, in which users can contribute to future shows by posting ideas, interview questions for upcoming guests, and stories on Spark's blog.

Young also hosts a podcast called The Sniffer with Cathi Bond. The podcast focuses on technology and trends and airs five-minute segments two or three times a week.

In 2012, Young wrote a book called The Virtual Self. She has spoken about her experiences in various media at events such as the Podcasters Across Borders and Northern Voice conferences, and has contributed to the Toronto Star.
