= Elyse Ashe Lord =

- Born: 1900
- Died: 1971 (aged 70–71)
- Education: Heatherley School of Fine Art
- Style: Watercolours and drypoint etching

Elyse Ashe Lord (1900–1971) was a British artist and illustrator who worked in watercolours and drypoint etching.

== Biography ==
Lord trained at the Heatherley School of Art in Chelsea, and the first public exhibition of her work was in 1919. Her drawings were exhibited at the Brook Street Gallery in 1921. In 1922 she became a member of the Royal Institute of Painters in Water Colours. Various large exhibitions of her works were held during her lifetime.

Lord's images typically draw on the Art Deco movement and ideas of Oriental culture, despite the fact that she never visited the Far East. She was a popular artist, even during a time period when the art market, and decorative arts particularly, was suffering from the economic crisis of the 1930s.

She was a resident of Bexley in Kent.
