= Richard Bond =

Richard or Dick Bond may refer to:

- Richard Bond (architect) (1798–1861), American architect in Boston, Massachusetts
- Dicky Bond (1883–1955), English footballer
- Dick Bond (Washington politician) (1921–2015), American politician, member of the Washington House of Representatives
- Dick Bond (Kansas politician) (1935–2020), American politician, Kansas state senator
- Dick Bond (cricketer) (born 1948), English cricketer
- Dick Bond (astrophysicist) (born 1950), Canadian astrophysicist and cosmologist
- Richard L. Bond, American businessman, president and CEO of Tyson Foods
- Richard Bond (political executive) (born 1950/1), American political executive, chairman of the Republican National Committee

== See also ==
- Bond (surname)
