= Jensine Costello =

Norwegian artist (born 1886)

Jensine Costello (born 7 May 1886) was a Norwegian painter of portraits and figure subjects who spent her career in Great Britain.

== Biography ==
Costello was born and grew up in Norway and, after spending time in the United States, moved to England where she studied at Heatherley's School of Art in London. She painted portraits and figure subjects, usually in oils, and exhibited widely. From 1936 to 1938, Costello showed works in Paris at the Paris Salon. She also exhibited with the Royal Institute of Oil Painters, the Society of Women Artists, the National Society of Painters, Sculptors and Gravers. For a time Costello lived at Ilford in Essex and then at Exmouth in Devon.
