= Billie Waters =

English painter (1896-1979)

- Born: Phyllis Mary Waters; 6 April 1896; Richmond, Surrey
- Died: 1979 (aged 82–83)
- Known for: Painting

Phyllis Mary Waters (6 April 1896 – 1979), known as Billie Waters was a British artist.

== Biography ==
Waters was born in Richmond, Surrey and studied art at the Heatherley School of Fine Art and then at the Grosvenor School of Modern Art. From 1926 to 1931 she lived in Newlyn, Cornwall and studied with the artists Ernest Procter and Harold Harvey at their art school for some time. For a period Waters worked as an apprentice to Proctor and learnt several techniques from him.

Waters first exhibited at the Royal Academy in London in 1928 and showed there annually throughout her working life. She also exhibited with the New English Art Club, the Royal Institute of Oil Painters and the Society of Women Artists. Waters was an elected member of the National Society of Painters, Sculptors and Gravers. In 1933, she had her first solo exhibition at the Leicester Galleries in London. In 1934 Waters was commissioned to create a mural for the Knightsbridge Grille in London.

Waters lived in London but continued to visit Cornwall on a regular basis and eventually moved to Lelant in the county. Waters was a frequent visitor to both France and Italy and became interested in fresco techniques early in her artistic career. She developed a distinct style of working in oils which created the appearance of tempera works. Meeting Ben Nicholson in Cornwall led Waters to experiment with abstraction, but the majority of her works are realistic and representational.
