= Henry Alexander Bowler =

English painter

Henry Alexander Bowler (30 November 1824 – 6 August 1903) was an English artist. He was a teacher at the Royal Academy of Arts for many years, and exhibited paintings there.

== Life ==
Bowler was born in the Kensington district of London, son of Charles and Frances Anne Bowler. After education at private schools he studied art at Leigh's School and the Government School of Design at Somerset House. In 1851 he was appointed headmaster of the Stourbridge College of Art, but was soon transferred to a teaching appointment in the school at Somerset House, where he had received his training. In 1855 he was appointed an inspector in the Science and Art Department, and in 1876 became assistant director for art at South Kensington. From 1861 to 1899 Bowler was teacher of perspective at the Royal Academy of Arts. He also held important posts in organising the 1862 International Exhibition and subsequent exhibitions.

From 1847 to 1871 Bowler exhibited ten pictures, mostly landscapes, at the Royal Academy, and others at the British Institution and elsewhere. A notable work is The Doubt: "Can these Dry Bones Live?" of 1854, exhibited at the Royal Academy in 1855, and again at the 1862 International Exhibition. It was presented to the Tate Gallery by a member of the family in 1921.

Bowler retired from the Science and Art Department in 1891. He died at his home in Kensington on 6 August 1903, and was buried at Kensal Green Cemetery.

In 1853 he married Ellen Archer Archer, daughter of Thomas Archer, J.P., vicar of Whitchurch, Buckinghamshire, and had three sons and one daughter.
