= Cathi Bond =

Canadian writer, broadcaster, and novelist

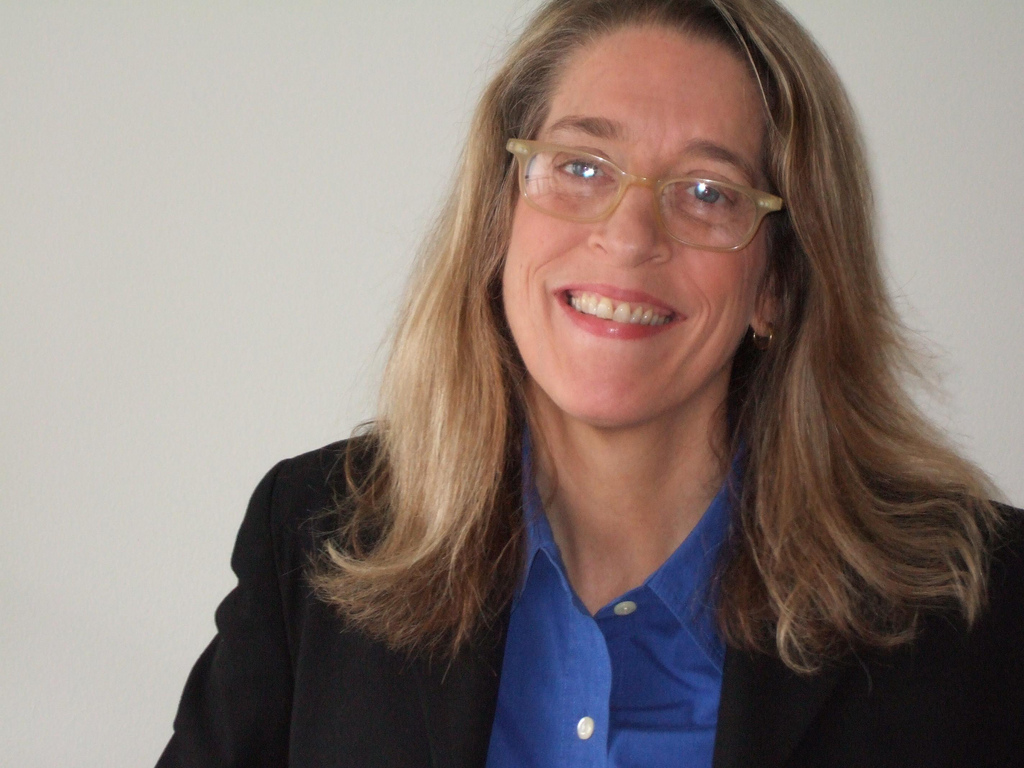
- Cathi Bond, 2007
- Born: Canada
- Occupations: writer; broadcaster; novelist

Cathi Bond is a Canadian writer, broadcaster, and novelist.

Bond is noted for employing both "old media" radio broadcasting and "new media" podcasting. She is a regular contributor to CBC Radio's Spark, and writes for Rabble.ca. On CBC Radio, she was a frequent film and cultural critic on Definitely Not the Opera, and sometimes appeared as a panelist on Saturday Night at the Movies beginning in 1999. As a podcaster, she co-hosts Reel Women, a bi-weekly movie podcast with Canadian feminist and author Judy Rebick. She also co-hosts The Sniffer, a podcast about technology and trends, with Nora Young, since at least 2006. She was the host of the podcast "Prosecast", a series of interviews with Canadian authors sponsored by HarperCollins Canada. Bond's novel Night Town was published by Iguana Books in 2013. It is a queer coming-of-age story set in 1970s Toronto.
