= John Scott (1849–1919) =

English painter

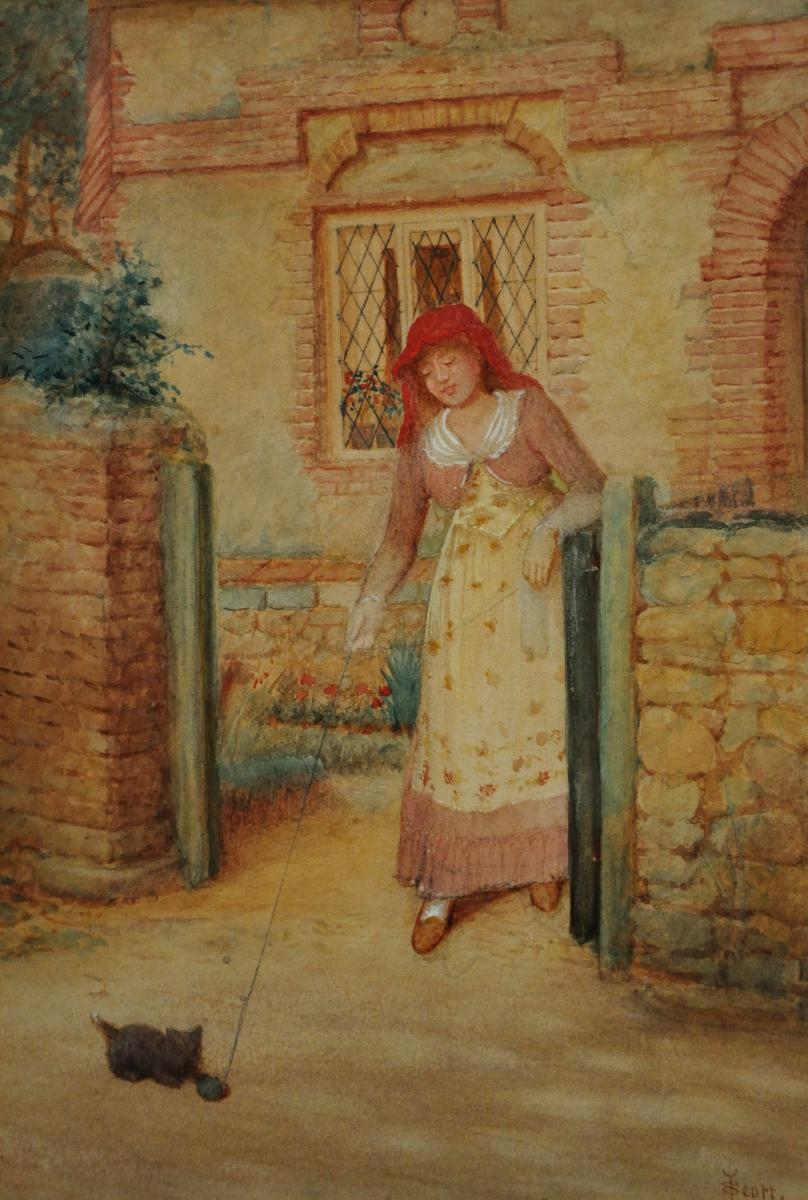
Playing with a kitten

John Scott RI, RBA (1849–1919) was an English artist, born in Carlisle.

== Life ==
Scott was born at 23 Rickergate, Carlisle, Cumberland, on 23 August 1849. His father and grandfather, both also named John Scott, had a business as gilders and manufacturers of stained glass. He had his early education at Hannah's Academy in Carlisle. He later studied at the Carlisle School of Art, while also working in the family business. He exhibited at the Royal Academy from 1872, and also showed works at the Carlisle School of Art's exhibition. The local newspaper described his Preparing for Market as "of considerable dimensions, very ambitious, but possessed of the elements of real success."

He continued his studies in London at Heatherley’s Studio and at the Royal Academy Schools. By 1879 he was living at Cannon Street, London. In that year he exhibited works both at the Royal Academy and in Dublin. He was elected a member of the Royal Society of British Artists (RBA) in 1882 of the Royal Institute of Painters in Watercolours (RI) in 1885.

He painted landscapes, religious scenes and genre works in oil and watercolour, exhibiting at the Royal Academy and the Royal Institute of Oil Painters (R.O.I.). Scott's watercolours range from rapid sketches to the highly finished works such as "The Convent Garden" 1911, and "Loves Young Dream".

=== Family ===
He married Georgiana Ellen Miller of Lechlade, Gloucestershire, at Kensington in August 1887. They had no children.
