= Derek Linnell =

Canadian ice hockey player

- Born: November 15, 1968 (age 57) Calgary, Alberta, Canada
- Height: 6 ft 1 in (185 cm)
- Weight: 210 lb (95 kg; 15 st 0 lb)
- Position: Defence
- Shot: Left
- Played for: Raleigh IceCaps (ECHL); Albany River Rats (AHL); Minnesota Moose (IHL); Alaska Gold Kings (WCHL)
- NHL draft: Undrafted
- Playing career: 1992–1996

Derek Linnell (born November 15, 1968) is a Canadian former professional ice hockey defenceman.

Linnell attended University of Alaska Fairbanks where he played NCAA Division I hockey with the Alaska Nanooks. In February 1992 he was forced to leave the team after it was found he was in violation of NCAA rules by playing while in his sixth year of college.

Linnell began his professional career with the 1992–93 season, playing three seasons with the ECHL team, before jumping to the West Coast Hockey League to play the 1995–96 season with the Alaska Gold Kings.
