= Terance James Bond =

British painter (1946-2023)

Terance James Bond (born September 1946 in Suffolk, died April 2023) was a British painter, best known for his paintings of birds, catalogued in his publications Birds: The Paintings of Terance James Bond (1989), Birds: An Artist's View (1997), and A Life in Detail: The Art of Terance James Bond (2006).
