= Frank Bond (disambiguation) =

Frank Bond (1863–1945) was a Canadian businessman and entrepreneur.

Frank Bond may also refer to:

- Frank Bond (politician) (1856–1931), Australian politician
- Frank Bond Centre

== See also ==
- Francis Bond (disambiguation)
