= Graham Bond (footballer) =

English footballer

Personal information
- Full name: Graham Charles Bond
- Date of birth: 30 December 1932
- Place of birth: Torquay, England
- Date of death: June 1998 (aged 65)
- Place of death: Torbay, Devon, England
- Position: Inside forward

Youth career
- Hele Spurs

Senior career*
Years	Team	Apps	(Gls)
1951–1960	Torquay United	128	(46)
1960–1961	Exeter City	10	(4)
1961–1962	Torquay United	5	(1)
- Weymouth
- Bideford
- * Club domestic league appearances and goals

Graham Charles Bond (30 December 1932 – June 1998) was an English professional footballer who played as an inside forward, most notably for Torquay United in the 1950s.
