= Colin Bond (footballer) =

Australian rules footballer

Personal information
- Full name: Colin Bond
- Born: 5 November 1941 (age 84)
- Original team: East Coburg
- Height: 180 cm (5 ft 11 in)
- Weight: 73 kg (161 lb)

Playing career^{1}
Years	Club	Games (Goals)
1961–1966	Fitzroy	54 (0)
- ^{1} Playing statistics correct to the end of 1966.

Colin Bond (born 5 November 1941) is a former Australian rules footballer who played for Fitzroy in the Victorian Football League (VFL).

Bond made his debut for Fitzroy in Round 6 of the 1961 VFL season, playing two matches in his debut year. He followed up in 1962 with seven matches and 1963 with four matches before becoming more of a regular player in 1964. He played his final VFL match in 1967 having played 54 league matches.
