= James Henry Robinson Bond =

British Army doctor

Colonel James Henry Robinson Bond, CBE, DSO, MRCS, LRCP (London) (21 July 1871 – 14 January 1943) was a British Army officer who served with the Royal Army Medical Corps during World War I.

Born on 21 July 1871, Bond was commissioned a lieutenant in the Royal Army Medical Corps on 18 July 1899. From late 1899 to 1902 he served in the Second Boer War in South Africa, and was awarded the Queen's South Africa Medal with six clasps and the King's South Africa Medal with two clasps. After the end of the war, he was promoted to captain on 28 July 1902, and left Point Natal for British India on the SS Ionian in October 1902.

He reached the rank of lieutenant colonel in 1915, and from 1915 to 1918 he served in the Mesopotamian campaign, being mentioned in despatches, receiving the Distinguished Service Order (DSO) in 1917 and being made a commander of the Order of the British Empire (CBE) in 1919. He went on retired pay in 1924 and died on 14 January 1943. His address was Kenelm, Eldorado Crescent, Cheltenham.

== Sources ==
- Who Was Who, vol. IV
