= Arthur James F. Bond =

English artist

Arthur James F. Bond RSMA
- Born: 29 April 1888; Devonport, England
- Died: 24 March 1958 (aged 69)
- Education: Heatherley School of Fine Art, Central School of Art and Design
- Alma mater: Goldsmiths College
- Known for: Oil painting, watercolour, etching Maritime art

Arthur James F. Bond, RSMA (29 April 1888 – 24 March 1958) was an English artist who worked in oils, watercolour and etching.

== Life and work ==
Bond was born in 1888 in Devonport, Devon, England. His father, Richard Bond was the vicar of St James' Church, Devonport. When he was of age, Arthur was sent to a boarding school in Somerset.

After leaving school, Bond moved to London to concentrate on his artistic career, studying art at Heatherley's, at Goldsmiths College and at the Central School of Arts and Crafts. He first London address was in St Margarets-on-Thames, before moving to Twickenham in 1913, then Barnes, before settling in Richmond, in 1918. During the First World War, Bond served in the Royal Navy, mainly on the minelaying fleet operating from Harwich. Like many artists, London proved a muse for Bond which is evident in his numerous etchings and paintings of the city. Bond also favoured maritime subjects and was elected a member of the Royal Society of Marine Artists and the Wapping Group of Artists. He established a studio on Gravesend Pier in the same building used by Thames river pilots. During 1956, this pier-head studio became the setting for a number of Wapping Group invited meetings where members could chat to many of the pilots. Bond exhibited often in the capital, with six paintings shown at the Royal Academy between 1912 and 1918.
