= Thomas Bond Walker =

Irish painter (1861–1933)

- Born: 1861; London, England
- Died: 1933 (aged 71–72)
- Known for: Painting
- Children: David Bond Walker

Thomas "Tom" Bond Walker (1861 London - 1933) was a British portrait painter and teacher who lived and worked in Belfast.

== Life ==
Thomas Bond Walker, known as Tom, was born in London and studied at the Royal College of Art, London. He moved to Belfast in the 1880s following his marriage to an Irish woman. He was widowed, and raised his son, David Bond Walker (1892-1977). His son also became a painter.

He exhibited regularly with Belfast Art Society from 1892 to 1896, becoming a member in 1893. He later the Royal Ulster Academy. He exhibited once with the Royal Hibernian Academy in 1926.

To supplement his income he tutored private pupils, one of whom was Paul Henry. Henry recalled Walker as "a shy, retiring, ineffectual little man with a genuine enthusiasm for teaching". Henry was sixteen when he first met Walker, an encounter which Henry later described as having "changed the whole course" of his life by being introduced to oil paints. After the death of Henry's father, Walker continued to teach him free of charge.

Walker later introduced Henry to the paintings of Robert Winchester Fraser, whose work he greatly admired. Fraser often painted scenes of rivers, estuaries and boats. Henry's seascapes date from this period and the influence of Fraser is evident.

Walker died in Belfast in 1933.

== Gallery ==
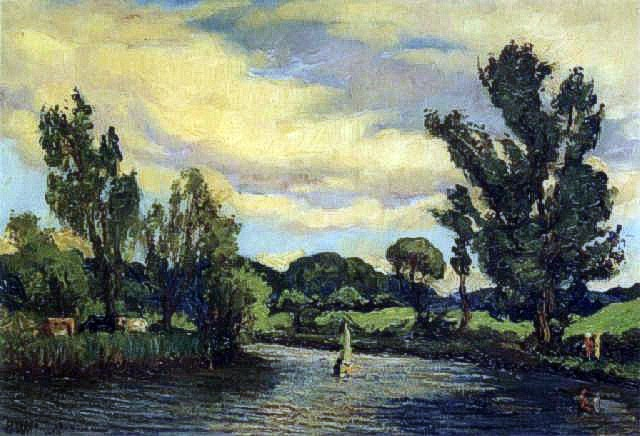
Sailing boat on River Lagan, Belfast

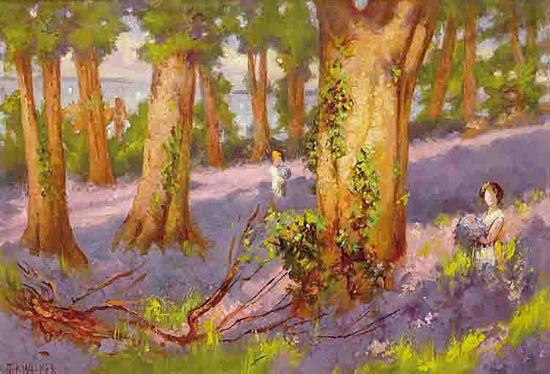
Bluebells with view of Belfast lough

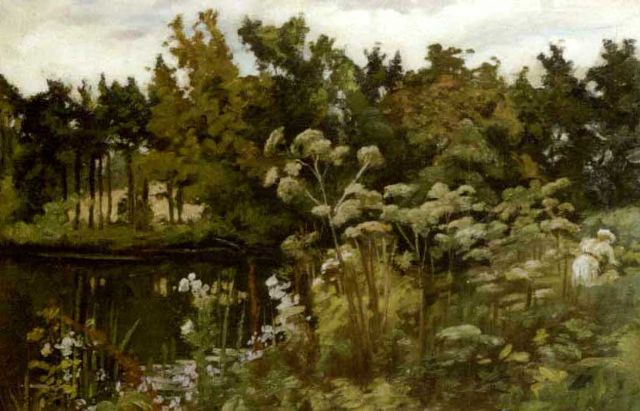
Lady in shrubbery

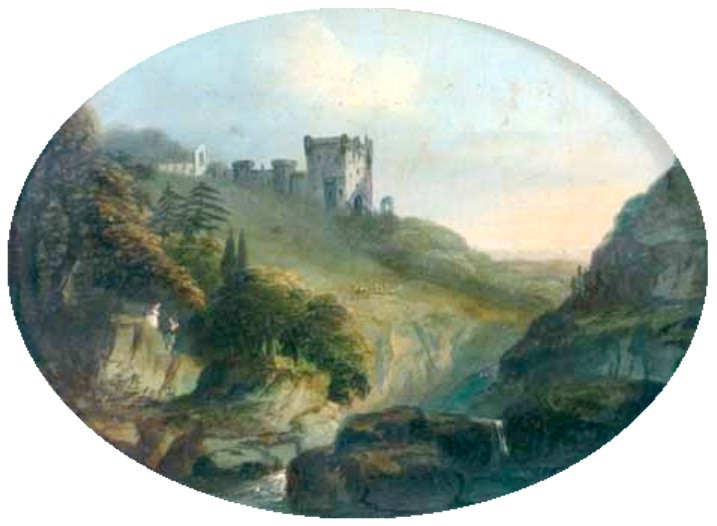
Roslin Castle
