= Mark Bond =

Mark Bond may refer to:

- Mark Bond, musician in the band De Novo Dahl
- Mark Bond, see Freemen on the land#Court cases
