= Lloyd Bond =

American researcher

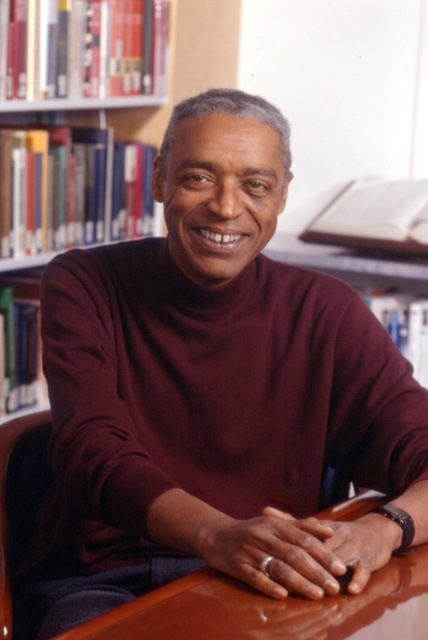
Dr. Lloyd Bond

Lloyd Bond was an American researcher in the field of psychometrics (educational and psychological measurement). As of 2009, he was a consulting scholar at the Carnegie Foundation for the Advancement of Teaching in Stanford, California; he served as a senior scholar at the foundation from 2002 to 2008.

Bond gained his PhD in psychology from Johns Hopkins University in 1976, specializing in psychometrics and quantitative models. His early positions were at the University of Pittsburgh. From 1988, he held a professorship in the Department of Educational Research Methodology at the University of North Carolina at Greensboro.

A fellow of the American Psychological Association and the American Educational Research Association, Bond is noted for research on the assessment of teaching ability, bias in testing, and cognitive processes underlying standardized test performance. He has served on committees of the National Academy of Sciences, the American Psychological Association and the American Educational Research Association.

Bond died on September 28, 2023.

== Key papers ==
Bond, L., Smith, T., Baker, W. K., & Hattie. J. (2000). The certification system of the National Board for Professional Teaching Standards: A construct and consequential validity study, Center for Educational Research and Evaluation, University of North Carolina, Greensboro.

Hattie, J., Jaeger, R. M., & Bond, L. (1999). Persistent methodological questions in educational testing, Review of Educational Research, 24, 393–446.

Bond, L. (1988). The effects of special preparation on measures of scholastic ability. In R. Linn (Ed.), Educational Measurement, 3rd ed. New York: American Council on Education/Macmillan.
