= Christopher Bond (disambiguation) =

Christopher Bond (born 1945) is a British playwright and theatre director.

Christopher or Chris Bond may also refer to:

- Kit Bond (born 1939), United States Senator from Missouri
- Chris Bond (footballer) (born 1969), Australian rules footballer
- Chris Bond (wheelchair rugby) (born 1986), Australian wheelchair rugby player
- Christopher Bond (composer) (born 1992), British composer
- Chris Bond, contemporary Australian artist, winner of the Arthur Guy Memorial Painting Prize in 2013
- Chris Bond, guitarist on the 1973 hit "She's Gone"
