= Spark (radio show) =

Canadian radio talk show

- Genre: Talk show
- Running time: 54 minutes
- Country of origin: Canada
- Language(s): English
- Home station: CBC Radio One
- Hosted by: Nora Young
- Created by: Nora Young
- Produced by: Michelle Parise, Adam Killick, Kent Hoffman and Nora Young
- Original release: September 5, 2007 – September 2024
- No. of episodes: 501 (as of February 26, 2021)
- Website: cbc.ca/spark
- Podcast: cbc.ca/podcasting

Spark was a Canadian radio talk show about "technology and culture." Hosted by Nora Young, the program made its CBC Radio One début on September 5, 2007. The show was also broadcast on Sirius Satellite Radio 159 and, since January 9, 2010, on Vermont Public Radio's network of stations in the United States. It was also broadcast in Australia on the Australian Broadcasting Corporation's Radio National network. Spark was produced in Toronto by Young and a team that consisted of Michelle Parise, Adam Killick, and Kent Hoffman. The show ended in September 2024 after 17 seasons.

The program was made collaboratively with its audience. Nora Young often encouraged listeners to become "Spark Contributors" by participating in the active conversations on the Spark Blog, notifying the Spark Team of interesting ideas to investigate, or even recording interviews and letting Spark use them on the show. The show often played phone messages left by Spark listeners and featured comments left on the Spark Blog. Its episodes made use of Creative Commons music until October 2010, when CBC management realized that Spark was available on some platforms considered to be commercial, violating use restrictions of most of the music available under the Creative Commons licenses. This prompted Spark to limit its use to the APM Music library.

Spark sometimes comments on proposed legislation that affects widely used technology. An example was the Copyright Modernization Act and the bills leading up to it.

== Producers ==
In addition to Nora Young, producers included Michelle Parise, Adam Killick, Kent Hoffman Dan Misener, Elizabeth Bowie and Carma Jolly.

== Multiple podcasts ==
The on-air version was available as a weekly podcast, augmented with two additional audio feeds: Spark Plus (which featured "bonus audio" such as full interviews), and "Bandwidth with Anshuman Iddamsetty", a weekly technology column by one of Spark's producers.

Spark Lite, a low-bandwidth podcast of the on-air version powered by blip.tv, was available from November 2008 to October 2011; it ended due to changes in blip.tv policy.
