= George Bond (footballer) =

English footballer

Personal information
- Full name: George Albert Bond
- Date of birth: 11 February 1910
- Place of birth: Ilford, England
- Date of death: 1982 (aged 71–72)
- Position: Defender

Senior career*
Years	Team	Apps	(Gls)
1930–1931	Redhill		
1931–1933	Millwall	60	(23)
1933–1934	Northfleet United		
1934–1935	Gillingham	9	(2)
1935–1938	Floriana	12	(4)
1938–1939	Ħamrun Spartans	2	(3)
1939–1940	Sliema Wanderers	4	(3)
Total		87	(35)
- * Club domestic league appearances and goals

George Albert Bond (11 February 1910 – 1982) was an English professional footballer. He played for Millwall and Gillingham between 1931 and 1936, making 69 appearances in the Football League, before emigrating to Malta.
