= Edward Bond (disambiguation) =

Edward Bond (1934–2024) was a British playwright.

Edward Bond may also refer to:

- Edward A. Bond (1849–1929), NY State Engineer and Surveyor 1899–1904
- Edward Augustus Bond (1815–1898), English librarian
- Edward Bond (politician) (1844–1920), British Conservative politician
