= Sir Henry Bond, 2nd Baronet =

English Jacobite

Sir Henry Bond, 2nd Baronet (died 1721) was an English Jacobite.

== Biography ==
He was the eldest son of Sir Thomas Bond, 1st Baronet, and succeeded his father in the baronetcy in 1685. He was receiver-general in Ireland for King James II, and represented Portarlington in the Patriot Parliament of 1689. A non-juror, he accompanied James to France, for which he was attainted and his title and lands forfeited, though these were restored to him in 1707. He mostly lived abroad, and sold the family estate of Peckham to the Trevor family. On his death in 1721 he was succeeded by his son, Thomas.

Parliament of Ireland
New constituency	Member of Parliament for Portarlington; 1689; With: Thomas Hackett	Succeeded by Daniel Gahan; Richard Warburton
Baronetage of England
Preceded by Thomas Bond	Baronet (of Peckham); 1685–1721	Succeeded by Thomas Bond
