= Iain Bond =

English cricketer (born 1973)

Personal information
- Full name: Iain Anthony Bond
- Born: 7 November 1973 (age 53); Barnstaple, Devon, England
- Batting: Right-handed
- Bowling: Right-arm fast-medium

Domestic team information
- Years: Team
- 1996–2003: Devon

Career statistics
| Competition | List A |
|---|---|
| Matches | 2 |
| Runs scored | – |
| Batting average | – |
| 100s/50s | –/– |
| Top score | – |
| Balls bowled | 102 |
| Wickets | 3 |
| Bowling average | 25.66 |
| 5 wickets in innings | – |
| 10 wickets in match | – |
| Best bowling | 2/38 |
| Catches/stumpings | 1/– |
- Source: Cricinfo, 4 February 2011

Iain Anthony Bond (born 7 November 1973) is an English cricketer. Bond is a right-handed batsman who bowls right-arm fast-medium. He was born at Barnstaple, Devon.

Bond made his debut for Devon in the 1996 Minor Counties Championship against Cornwall. From 1996 to 2003, he represented Devon in twenty-one Championship matches, the last of which came against Dorset. The following season he made his MCCA Knockout Trophy debut for Devon, which came against Wales Minor Counties. From 1997 to 1999 he represented Dorset in eight Trophy matches, the last of which came against the Warwickshire Cricket Board.

In 1999, he made his List A debut for Devon, playing two against Berkshire in the 2nd round of the 1999 NatWest Trophy and Worcestershire in the 3rd round of the same competition. In his two List A matches, he took 3 wickets at a bowling average of 25.66, with best figures of 2/38.

Bond played Second XI Championship cricket for the Somerset Second XI in 1993 and 1994. He currently plays club cricket for Braunton Cricket Club in the Devon Cricket League.
