= Francis Bond =

Francis Bond may refer to:

- Francis Godolphin Bond (1765–1839), rear-admiral
- Francis Bond (architectural historian) (1852–1918)
- Sir Francis George Bond (1856–1930), British soldier and amateur football player
- Francis Bond (governor) on List of governors of Barbados

== See also ==
- Frank Bond (disambiguation)
- Francis Bond Head (1793–1875), Lieutenant-Governor of Upper Canada
