= John Bond (rugby union) =

Australian rugby union player (1892–1963)

- Born: John Herbert Bond; 6 August 1892 Newcastle, New South Wales
- Died: 17 September 1963 (aged 71)

Rugby union career
- Position: Hooker
International career
Years	Team	Apps	(Points)
1920–21	Australia	4	(3)

John Herbert Bond (6 August 1892 – 17 September 1963), nicknamed "Plumb", was an Australian rugby union player. A hooker, Bond claimed a total of four international rugby caps for Australia.

Bond was born in Newcastle, New South Wales. During the First World War, he served as a quartermaster in the Australian Imperial Force (AIF).
