= Douglas Bond =

American author

- Born: October 29, 1958 (age 67)
- Occupation: Author
- Children: Brittany; Rhodri; Cedric; Desmond; Giles; Gillian
- Website: www.bondbooks.net

Douglas E. Bond (born October 29, 1958) is an American author. He is not to be confused with the musician and singer-songwriter, Douglas Burke Bond Jr., who goes by the stage name, Hatchatorium, and is also a writer/author. Douglas E. Bond has written more than 30 books, primarily of historical fiction.

He earned a master's degree in Teaching (MIT) from St. Martin's University, and a Preliminary Certificate in Theology from Moore Theological College.

He was the English and history instructor at Covenant High School (CHS) in Tacoma, Washington from 1993 to 2015, receiving the 2005 Teacher Award from the Pierce County Library Foundation and Arts Commission, and the 2015 Teacher of the Year award from the Optimist Club. After more than two decades of positive performance reviews, he was terminated without process from CHS after the release of his book Grace Works! (And Ways We Think It Doesn't). Along with full-time writing and editing duties, he is Director for the Oxford Creative Writing Master Class.

Bond is lyricist for New Reformation Hymns and wrote the hymns for the 2017 Rise & Worship album, with music composed by Gregory Wilbur. Several of his books are translated and published in Dutch, Portuguese, and Korean. He speaks at churches and conferences, including Ligonier conferences, and in 2018 in schools and churches in Perth, Western Australia. Additionally, since 1996, he has led numerous history tours in Europe.

His articles have appeared in periodicals, including Modern Reformation and Tabletalk, and he has spoken at conferences with Ted Tripp, Joel Beeke, Steven Lawson, Robert Godfrey, Derek Thomas, and R. C. Sproul. He was featured in a CBS news report in 2010 when a group of students he was leading on a Great Britain tour were delayed from coming home by volcanic activity in Iceland. He has served on the advisory board of Glorious Films in Montreal and Reformed University Fellowship.

He is a ruling elder in the Presbyterian Church in America. In 2015, he was elected to the General Assembly committee for Reformed University Ministries, which oversees the campus ministry of Reformed University Fellowship.

== Bibliography ==
- Mr. Pipes and the British Hymn Makers
- Mr. Pipes and Psalms and Hymns of the Reformation
- Mr. Pipes Comes to America
- Duncan’s War
- King’s Arrow
- Rebel’s Keep
- The Accidental Voyage
- Hostage Lands
- Guns of Thunder
- Guns of the Lion (2008)
- Stand Fast In the Way of Truth (2008)
- Hold Fast In a Broken World (2008)
- Guns of Providence (2010)
- The Betrayal (2009)
- The Mighty Weakness of John Knox (2011)
- The Thunder (2012)
- The Poetic Wonder of Isaac Watts (2012)
- Augustus Toplady: Debtor to Mercy Alone (2012)
- Hand of Vengeance (2012)
- Forgotten Songs: Reclaiming the Psalms for Worship (2012)
- Girolamo Savonarola: Heart Aflame (2013)
- Grace Works! (And Ways We Think It Doesn't) (2014)
- War in the Wasteland (2016)
- Luther in Love (2017)
- Rise & Worship, New Reformation Hymns (cd album) (2017)
- The Resistance (2018)
- God Sings! (And Ways We Think He Ought To) (2019)
- The Hobgoblins (2020)
- Hostage Lands
