= Simon Bond =

Simon Bond may refer to:

- Simon Bond (1947–2011), author of 101 Uses for a Dead Cat
- Simon Bond (Doctors), a character from Doctors
