= Tony Bond (footballer, born 1888) =

English footballer

Personal information
- Date of birth: 1888
- Place of birth: Preston, England
- Position: Outside right

Senior career*
Years	Team	Apps	(Gls)
- Ashton Town
1910–1911	Bradford City	1	(0)
- Lancaster Town
- * Club domestic league appearances and goals

Anthony Bond (born 1888) was an English professional footballer who played as an outside right.

== Career ==
Born in Preston, Bond played for Ashton Town, Bradford City and Lancaster Town. For Bradford City, he made one appearance in the Football League.

== Sources ==
- Frost, Terry (1988). Bradford City A Complete Record 1903-1988. Breedon Books Sport. ISBN 0-907969-38-0.
