= Haynes King (painter) =

English genre painter (1831–1904)

- Born: December 1831; Barbados
- Died: 17 May 1904 (aged 72); London, England
- Occupation: Painter
- Spouse: Annie Elizabeth Wilson (m. 1866)

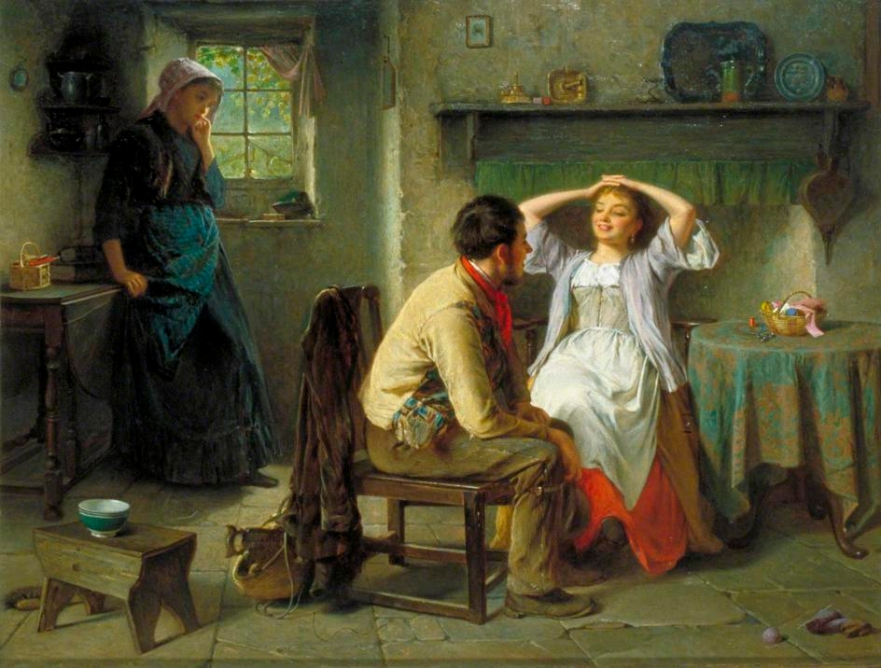
Jealousy and Flirtation, 1874, oil on canvas

Haynes King (December 1831 – 17 May 1904) was an English genre painter. Apart from genre subjects, he painted interiors, landscapes, and coast scenes with figures.

== Biography ==
King was born at Barbados in December 1831, son of Robert M. King by his wife Maria. Coming to London in 1854, he became a student at Leigh's (afterwards Heatherley's) Academy in Newman Street, London. He first exhibited in 1857 at the Society of British Artists, of which he was elected a member in 1864; many of his works appeared at its exhibitions, and forty-eight were shown at the Royal Academy between 1860 and 1904. He worked at one period with Thomas Faed whose influence is seen in his work.

King resided latterly at 103 Finchley Road, Hampstead, N.W., with the painter Henry Yeend King. He married Annie Elizabeth Wilson in 1866, a widow, and left no family.. After months of ill health he committed suicide on 17 May 1904

== Works ==
Among King's works were Looking Out (1860), The Laco Maker (1866), A Water-Carrier, Rome (1869), Homeless (1872), News from the Cape (1879), Approaching Footsteps (1883), Getting Granny's Advice (1890), The New Gown (1892), and Latest Intelligence, which appeared at the Royal Academy in 1904. His Jealousy and Flirtation (a cottage interior dated 1874) went to the Bethnal Green Museum, and An Interesting Paragraph to the City Art Gallery, Leeds.
