= Andrew Bond (rugby union) =

Rugby union player from Northern Ireland

- Full name: Andrew Thomas Bond
- Born: 17 August 1871 Derry, Ireland
- Died: 21 August 1931 (aged 60) South Africa

Rugby union career
- Position: Forward
International career
| Years | Team | Apps | (Points) |
| 1894 | Ireland | 2 | (0) |

Andrew Thomas Bond (17 August 1871 – 21 August 1931) was an Irish international rugby union player.

== Life and career ==
A Derry forward, Bond was capped twice for Ireland, both during their triple crown–winning 1894 Home Nations campaign. He featured in Ireland's final two fixtures, against Scotland in Dublin and Wales in Belfast.

Bond served with a Yeomanry regiment during the Second Boer War. Remaining in South Africa, Bond was a member of the local police force and became a district commissioner. He was married with two daughters.

== See also ==
- List of Ireland national rugby union players
