= Andrew Bond (cricketer) =

Australian former first-class cricketer

Personal information
- Full name: Andrew Nicholas Bond
- Born: 13 September 1978 (age 48); Melbourne, Victoria, Australia
- Batting: Right-handed
- Bowling: Right-arm medium

Domestic team information
- Years: Team
- 1999: Oxford University

Career statistics
Competition	First-class
Matches	1
Runs scored	6
Batting average	6.00
100s/50s	–/–
Top score	6
Balls bowled	102
Wickets	2
Bowling average	37.00
5 wickets in innings	–
10 wickets in match	–
Best bowling	2/41
Catches/stumpings	1/–
- Source: Cricinfo, 23 January 2020

Andrew Nicholas Bond (born 13 September 1978) is an Australian former first-class cricketer.

Bond was born at Melbourne in September 1978. He studied in England at St Catherine's College at the University of Oxford. While studying at Oxford, he made a single appearance in first-class cricket for Oxford University against Glamorgan at Oxford in 1999. Bond batted once in the match, scoring 6 runs in Oxford's first-innings before he was dismissed by Mike Powell, while with his right-arm medium pace bowling, he took the wickets of David Harrison and Ismail Dawood in Glamorgan's second-innings, finishing with match figures of 2 for 74.
