= Alan Bond (disambiguation) =

Alan Bond (1938–2015) was an Australian businessman.

Alan Bond is also the name of:

- Alan Bond (engineer) (born 1944), British aerospace engineer
- Alan Bond, British jockey who was British flat racing Champion Apprentice
- Alan Bond, musician on Blackgrass album
