= Gordon C. Bond =

American historian

Gordon C. Bond (1939–1997) was an American historian who specialized in studies of Napoleon. He was a professor of history and dean of the College of Liberal Arts at Auburn University.

Bond received his bachelor's degree, masters and Ph.D. degrees from Florida State University. He spent a year teaching at the University of Southern Mississippi before joining the Auburn University faculty in 1967. He was a visiting professor at the University of Utah for one year. Bond was chair of the Auburn University Faculty Senate in 1982 when it was often at odds with President Hanley Funderburk. He served as head of the history department before being named dean of the College of Liberal Arts from 1992 until his death.

Among the works by Bond was The Grand Expedition: The British Invasion of Holland in 1809.
