= Kevin Bond =

Kevin Bond may refer to:

- Kevin Bond (English footballer) (born 1957), former English footballer and manager
- Kevin Bond (Australian footballer) (1928–1991), Australian rules footballer
- Kevin Bond (musician), musician with Superjoint Ritual
