= Michael Bond (disambiguation) =

Michael Bond (1926–2017) was an English author.

Michael Bond may also refer to:

- Michael Bond (hurler) (born 1948), retired Ireland hurling manager and former player
- Michael Bond (physician) (born 1936), British physician and medical researcher
- Michael Bond (American politician), Democratic member of the Illinois Senate
- Michael Bond (South African politician), South African MP
- Michael Bond (rugby union) (born 1987), Australian rugby union player
- Mike Bond, American novelist and journalist
