= John Bond (physicist) =

English physicist and forensic scientist

John W. Bond OBE (born 1956) is an English physicist and forensic scientist. He developed a technique for lifting fingerprints off of metal years after they are left by virtue of the corrosion caused to the metal by the fingerprint sweat. He has several patented inventions related to metal corrosion. His invention was named a Times magazine best invention of 2008. In 2011, he received an OBE in the Queen's Birthday Honours list for services to Forensic Science.
