= Robert Richard Bond =

American lawyer

Robert R. Bond (September 26, 1918 – October 18, 1969) was the first graduate of what is today called North Carolina Central University School of Law (NCCU School of Law). He graduated in 1943, and was the only African American to successfully pass the North Carolina bar exam that same year.

== Early life ==
Bond was born on September 26, 1918, to John Bond, Sr. and Mary Bond, both school teachers. John Sr. also served as a principal of a Rosenwald School, and the John B. Bond High School was named after him. Robert Bond graduated from high school in 1935 and began attending North Carolina College for Negroes (today NCCU) in 1937, pursuing a degree in business administration. He originally planned to attend medical school after college, but was persuaded to instead pursue a career in law.

== Law school ==
Bond registered to attend NCCU School of Law beginning in 1939, but because he was the only student to register at the new school, the school's opening was delayed until September 1940. The school had been opened in response to State of Missouri ex. rel. Gaines v. Canada, a 1938 U.S. Supreme Court decision, which held that states must provide blacks facilities for legal education that are "substantially equal" to those available to whites.

The lack of resources at the new school made the experience difficult for Bond. The new law school only had a small amount of space in the North Carolina Central University administration building. It did not have the benefit of an established faculty so he often went to neighboring law schools such as the University of North Carolina at Chapel Hill (UNC) and Duke University and sat in the back of the class, even though he was not able to participate. Professors from UNC and Duke would sometimes go to NCCU School of Law's campus to test Bond and occasionally offer instruction, but Bond usually had to learn the material on his own. NCCU School of Law did not have its own library, so he was forced to use the libraries of other schools at night, since African Americans were not allowed to be there during the day. Despite these challenges, Bond became the first graduate of NCCU School of Law in 1943.

== Professional career ==
Bond was the only African American to successfully pass the North Carolina bar exam in 1943. He then moved to Washington, D.C., where he worked for the Social Security Administration until 1947, when he moved to Wilmington, North Carolina, to go into private practice.

Bond was the only black attorney in Wilmington during his lifetime. He was a strong civil rights advocate, and because of this, often faced threats and harassment. He commonly found notes on his car saying "the KKK is watching you." Bond married Margaret Farnsworth in 1953 and the couple had a daughter named Michele. He worked hard to desegregate the New Hanover County Schools by filing a lawsuit and convincing black families to send their children to their neighborhood schools, forcing desegregation. He also worked to free jailed demonstrators during the civil rights demonstrations in Wilmington.

He worked on the first case of hospital discrimination to go to court. He, along with Conrad Pearson, another prominent black attorney, represented three African American plaintiffs in Eaton v. Board of Managers of the James Walker Memorial Hospital, a case brought by three African American physicians who argued that they could not be excluded from courtesy staff privileges at the hospital solely because of their race, as such discrimination was unconstitutional under the Fourteenth Amendment. The court eventually dismissed the case, but it still encouraged other lawyers to support the abolition of racial discrimination in public places.

Richard Bond was a member of various professional, social, and fraternal organizations. These included the North Carolina Lawyer's Association, the Wilmington, North Carolina Bar Association, the New Hanover County Democratic Party, and the Guardsmen. He was also a member of Omega Psi Phi fraternity and was a 33rd Degree Mason. A portrait of Robert Bond hangs in the NCCU School of Law today recognizing him as the first graduate of the school.

Bond died on October 18, 1969.
