= Shane Bond (disambiguation) =

Shane Bond may refer to:

- Shane Bond (born 1975), retired New Zealand cricketer
- Shane Bond (footballer, born 1954), former Australian rules footballer who played for Collingwood and North Melbourne
- Shane Bond (footballer, born 1975), former Australian rules footballer who played for West Coast and Port Adelaide
