= Jack Bond =

Jack Bond may refer to:

- Jack Bond (cricketer) (1932–2019), English cricketer
- Jack Bond (director) (1937–2024), British film producer and director
