= William Bond =

William, Will, or Bill Bond may refer to:

== Law and politics ==
- William Bond (Massachusetts politician) (1625–1695), American politician in Massachusetts
- William K. Bond (1792–1864), U.S. representative for Ohio
- William West Bond (1884–1975), American lawyer and politician in Tennessee
- Will Bond (born 1970), American politician

== Military ==
- William S. Bond (Medal of Honor) (1839–1892), American Civil War soldier
- William Bond (RFC officer) (1889–1917), English World War I fighter ace
- William R. Bond (1918–1970), American military general

== Others ==
- William Bond (engraver) (fl. 1772–1827), British engraver
- William Cranch Bond (1789–1859), American astronomer
- William Bond (bishop) (1815–1906), Canadian archbishop
- Bill Bond (tennis) (1876–1951), American tennis player
- William Langhorne Bond (1893–1985), American airline executive and aviator
- William A. Bond (1917–1992), American big game hunter
- William D. Bond (born 1931), American inventor and mechanical engineer
- William Bond (author) (born 1946), British spiritual and religious writer

== Other uses ==
- Billy Bond y La Pesada del Rock and Roll, Argentine music group
