= Tony Bond (footballer, born 1913) =

English footballer

Personal information
- Full name: Anthony Bond
- Date of birth: 23 December 1913
- Place of birth: Preston, England
- Date of death: 6 July 1991 (aged 77)
- Position: Right winger

Youth career
- Dick Kerr's

Senior career*
Years	Team	Apps	(Gls)
	Preston North End	0	(0)
?–1932	Dick Kerr's XI		
1932–?	Blackburn Rovers	0	(0)
- Dick Kerr's XI
?–1936	Chorley		
1936–1937	Wolverhampton Wanderers	0	(0)
1937–?	Torquay United	15	(0)
- Chorley
	Preston North End	0	(0)
?–1945	Leyland Motors		
1945–1946	Southport	29	(12)
1946–1947	Accrington Stanley	29	(4)
- Fleetwood Town
- Bacup Borough
- Bamber Bridge
- * Club domestic league appearances and goals

Anthony Bond (23 December 1913 – 6 July 1991) was an English professional footballer who played as a right-winger. He appeared in the Football League for Torquay United, Southport and Accrington Stanley.
