= Henry Bond (British Army officer) =

Irish cricketer and British Army general

Brigadier-General Henry Bond DSO
- Born: Henry Hendley Bond; 13 June 1873
- Died: 10 November 1919 (aged 46); Glasnevin, Ireland
- Cricket career

Cricket information
- Batting: Unknown
- Bowling: Unknown

Domestic team information
- Years: Team
- 1898/99–1900/01: Europeans (India)

Career statistics
| Competition | First-class |
|---|---|
| Matches | 5 |
| Runs scored | 107 |
| Batting average | 15.28 |
| 100s/50s | –/– |
| Top score | 41 |
| Balls bowled | 30 |
| Wickets | 0 |
| Bowling average | – |
| 5 wickets in innings | – |
| 10 wickets in match | – |
| Best bowling | – |
| Catches/stumpings | 3/– |
- Source: ESPNcricinfo, 18 December 2018

Brigadier-General Henry Hendley Bond DSO (13 June 1873 – 10 November 1919) was a British Army officer and an Irish first-class cricketer. He came from a military family – his father was Major-General Henry Bond – and attended the Royal Military Academy, Woolwich. He was commissioned as an officer in the Royal Artillery and served in India, England, Ireland and during the Second Boer War. During his time in India he played first-class cricket for the Europeans cricket team. He was later a gunnery instructor and a champion racquets player.

Upon the outbreak of the First World War he was recalled to field service and commanded the 17th Battery of the Royal Field Artillery during the Battle of Mons, for which he was mentioned in dispatches by Field Marshal French. Bond later served with the British forces at Salonica and was promoted to the rank of lieutenant-colonel, brevet colonel and temporary brigadier-general. Bond received the Distinguished Service Order and was appointed as commander of the Order of the Crown of Romania for his service. Towards the end of the war he began to suffer from a degenerative neurological condition and died in Dublin in 1919.

== Early life ==
According to some sources, Bond was born at Ahmedabad in British India on 13 June 1873, but the registration of his birth indicates he was born in Ballymahon, County Longford. He was the son of Major General Henry Bond and his wife Mary Earbery Bond (née Hendley). Both of his parents were born in Ireland.

He was educated in England at Wellington College. Bond later attended the Royal Military Academy at Woolwich as a gentleman cadet and played in the academy's cricket team (including matches against the Royal Military College, Sandhurst in 1891 and 1892).

== Military career ==
After graduation Bond entered the Royal Artillery as a second lieutenant on 22 July 1892. He was promoted to the rank of lieutenant in August 1895. He was posted to British India in 1898, where he debuted in first-class cricket for the Europeans in the 1898/99 Bombay Presidency tournament against the Parsees at Bombay Gymkhana. He made a further four first-class appearances for the Europeans, all against the Parsees, up to 1900. Across his five matches, he scored a total of 107 runs at an average of 15.28, with a high score of 41.

Bond was promoted to the rank of captain on 6 April 1900. In 1902 he was serving with 136 Battery at Woolwich under the command of a Major Elton. Later that year, he served in the closing stages of the Second Boer War. Bond was seconded to the Colonial Office on 9 July 1904 and did not return to regular army service until 25 August 1907. He was attached to the Royal Artillery's 15th Battery at Dundalk, Ireland in 1908, which was then attached to the Sierra Leone Battalion. He was appointed unit adjutant on 23 April 1908 and promoted to the rank of major on 10 October 1909. Bond was seconded to the general staff on 1 April 1911 as a gunnery instructor. In the Irish Census of 1911 he is listed as living with his mother and sisters in Castlelyons, County Cork. In August 1911 he was chief umpire of a field artillery competition arranged by the National Artillery Association on Salisbury Plain. He declared the winner of the King's Prize for Field Artillery to be the 7th London Battery, who beat ten other units. In 1912 he played racquets for the Royal Artillery against the Royal Engineers in an annual match that was won by the engineers. At one stage he was the army racquets champion. By April 1914 he was the gunnery instructor at Larkhill Camp.

== First World War and death ==
Bond returned to general service (from his staff/instructor position) on 5 August 1914, after the outbreak of the First World War. On 20 November he was mentioned in dispatches by Field Marshal Sir John French, commander-in-chief (C-in-C) of the British Expeditionary Force (BEF), for his service during the Battle of Mons as commander of the 17th Battery of Royal Field Artillery. He served in the temporary rank of lieutenant-colonel from 21 December 1914 to 4 January 1915. Bond returned to the general staff on 27 February 1915 and was appointed a 2nd grade staff officer on 4 April 1915 when he became a brigade major. He returned to his unit on 21 July 1915 and served with the British force at Salonica. Bond was again granted the temporary rank of lieutenant-colonel from 22 August, before receiving promotion to the permanent rank on 11 September. He was on 9 September 1916 made a brigadier general, Royal Artillery (BGRA) and was granted the temporary rank of brigadier general while employed in this role.

He was awarded the Distinguished Service Order (DSO) in the 1917 New Year Honours and promoted to brevet colonel on 3 June 1917 "for distinguished service in the Field".

Soon after this, his health began to deteriorate due to a degenerative neurological condition. He suffered with the disease for eighteen months, before dying at Glasnevin in Dublin on 10 November 1919, at which point he held the temporary rank of brigadier general. When his death was registered, the cause of death was given as "general paralysis of the insane". Two months prior to his death, he had been appointed a commander of the Order of the Crown of Romania. He was buried in the churchyard near his family's home at Castlelyons, County Cork.
