= Arthur J. Bond =

- Born: 1939
- Died: December 30, 2012 (aged 73)
- Education: Purdue University, BSEE, MSEE, PhD
- Occupations: Electrical Engineer, Academic
- Known for: Dean of Engineering and Technology at Alabama A&M University, Co-Founder of the National Society of Black Engineers

Arthur J. Bond (1939 – December 30, 2012) was the dean of the School of Engineering and Technology at Alabama A&M University in Alabama, United States, and an activist in the cause of increasing black enrollment and retention in engineering and technology. He was a founding member of the National Society of Black Engineers and part of the team that fought for state funding of engineering at Alabama A&M University.

== Education ==
Bond came to Purdue University in 1957 to study electrical engineering on National Merit Scholarship and Purdue's Special Merit Scholarship. He describes always having been interested in electrical engineering, and ending up at Purdue by luck, recounting that "My high school principal's son was interested in engineering at Purdue... One day they were going for a visit to campus, and they asked me if I wanted to come."

After two years, however, he had to drop out due to a softball injury. After he recovered, he joined the army, "because Vietnam was looming on the horizon," he would later recount.

Bond returned to Purdue in 1966, was graduated with a bachelor's degree in electrical engineering (BSEE) in 1968, a master's degree in electrical engineering (MSEE) in 1969, and Ph.D. in 1974. At the time Bond was the 42nd African-American to earn a PhD in engineering, and only the 12th to earn it in electrical engineering.

== Student organizing ==
Bond was a student leader at Purdue during the time when the civil rights movement was in full swing. He would become a founding member of Purdue's Black Cultural Center and a founder of the National Society of Black Engineers.

At Purdue, Bond led students to demand that Purdue open up its engineering schools to more blacks and women. Frederick L. Hovde, Purdue's president at the time, was sympathetic to the cause. He appointed Bond to a steering committee, which organized the first national effort to increase minority participation in engineering.

Bond remembers "When you would go to class, you would never see another Black student from the day you entered Purdue until you graduated. So we didn't know what other black student was studying engineering." Responding to students' need for a place where minority students could network and study, Purdue provided black students with a house, which Bond and his friends would "move in and decorate it and call it a Black Cultural Center," Bond later said.

When two undergraduate black engineering students approached the dean of engineering to create a Black Society of Engineers, the dean agreed and assigned Bond, then a graduate student, to be the group's advisor. In 1971, working from other engineering association's constitutions, they wrote the constitution for the original chapter of the NSBE. This group would grow into a national organization that is now the National Society of Black Engineers, which as of 2011 had over 30,000 members.

== Career ==
Upon receiving his doctorate, Bond became an assistant professor of electrical engineering at Purdue for five years, and then an associate professor at Purdue Calumet. He then went to work in industry for RCA, AlliedSignal, and Bendix.

In 1989, Bond joined Tuskegee University as head of its department of electrical engineering, where he helped the Electrical Engineering Department regain full accreditation from the Accrediting Board for Engineering and Technology (ABET).

In 1992, Bond joined Alabama A&M as Dean of Engineering and Technology. At the time, the land-grant university was involved in the notorious Knight v. Alabama lawsuit, in which the plaintiff class, joined by the U.S. Justice Department argued that the State of Alabama's system of public university funding is a violation of equal rights.

The case resulted in a 1995 decree that ordered Alabama to fund engineering at Alabama A&M. The ruling further ordered that whatever level of the engineering program that would be built up in nine years would constitute the required level of funding by the state.

As dean, Bond played a pivotal role in meeting the nine-year challenge. A&M's efforts bore fruit in 1997, when it was able to offer the first engineering courses. In 2000 mechanical and electrical engineering at A&M was accredited with the effective date made retroactive to 1998.

Bond retired from Alabama A&M in 1996.

== Honors ==
- 1968: Bachelor of Science in Electrical Engineering, Purdue University.
- 1969: Masters of Science in Electrical Engineering, Purdue University.
- 1971: Co-Founder of The Society of Black Engineers (now NSBE).
- 1974: Assistant Professor, Purdue University.
- 1979: Associate Professor, Purdue University, Calumet Campus.
- 1984: Principal Engineer, Bendix Engine Control Systems.
- 1989: Head of Electrical Engineering Department, Tuskegee University.
- 1992-96: Dean of Engineering and Technology, Alabama A&M University.
- 1994: Minorities in Engineering Award (formerly Vincent Bendix Award), American Society for Engineering Education.
- 1994: NACME Reginald Jones Distinguished Service Award for Minorities in Engineering for service above the call of duty
- 2000: Golden Torch Award for Academic Visionary, National Society of Black Engineers
- 2000: Outstanding Electrical and Computer Engineer, Purdue University
- 2005: Distinguished Engineering Alumni, Purdue University.
- 2009: Doctor of Engineering (Honoris Causa), Purdue University.
- 2010: Alabama A&M University named new Engineering & Technology Building Arthur J. Bond Hall.
