= Felicity Green =

British journalist (1926–2026)

Felicity Green

Felicity Green OBE (26 June 1926 – 10 September 2026) was a British fashion journalist and newspaper executive.

== Early life and career ==
Green was born on 26 June 1926 and raised in Dagenham, Essex, in rooms above a bike shop. She came from an impoverished Jewish background; her father ran a local shoe shop while her mother, though deaf, was the more formidable parent. Her father was cruel to her mother, although Green, their only child, attempted to control his behaviour. She did share a love of the cinema with him, and they saw two double features together each Thursday. From the movies, Green acquired her interest in glamour and fashion.

Initially a short hand typist and secretary at Woman & Beauty in the 1940s, she was promoted to fashion editor within two years. After this she joined Housewife, where she assumed the same post, and then W.S. Crawford, the advertising agency, for a time.

== Mirror Group journalist ==
In 1955, Hugh Cudlipp asked Green's opinion of Woman's Sunday Mirror, a publication for which he was responsible. Following a severe analysis, she was hired as Fleet Street's first female associate editor. The title was short-lived, being folded into Woman magazine.

Green moved on to the Sunday Pictorial (as the Sunday Mirror was then named) in 1959 filling the same post as before. Since 1955, her immediate boss had been Lee Howard, and she became associate editor of the Daily Mirror in 1961 when Howard was appointed the newspaper's editor. Green recalled her new colleagues' response to her: "They were all being as helpfully 'feminine' as they could, which was the last thing I wanted. My plan was to make the pages interesting to men, too."

Her responsibilities included women's editor, and to promote the interests of women in all areas of the newspaper's activities. Her writing for the paper included fashion, although Green wrote in 2011 that she was really more interested in style, and admitted to modelling herself on film star Audrey Hepburn. For including the miniskirts of Mary Quant in the Mirror, Green was effectively threatened with the sack by Cecil King, then chairman of the International Publishing Corporation, of which the Mirror Group of Newspapers was a part. Cudlipp, by then chairman of the Mirror Group, supported her. According to Roy Greenslade, Cuidlipp told Green in December 1964: "I don't understand what you're doing but I trust you. So I've decided to give you the front and back pages of the Mirror to tell our readers what the Swinging 60s are all about."

Sex, Sense and Nonsense, published in November 2014, is Green's anthology of her 1960s work for the Daily Mirror.

== Executive posts and later career ==
Green felt that she retained a distance as a journalist and avoided being fully absorbed into the fashion industry. "Fashion is not a bloody religion, as most fashion editors seem to think it is," she told Anna Murphy of The Daily Telegraph in 2014. "There is a difference between fashion and clothes. One is the real stuff, which is the clothes. Then there is fashion, which is some kind of mesmeric stuff out there that persuades the world to go in certain directions rather mysteriously. It's all big business. And I'd rather people spent money on clothes than arms."

Later Green became executive women's editor across the three Mirror titles, and in 1973, the group's publicity director. She joined the newspaper's board, the first woman to achieve such a position, at this point. Green had some initial trouble, as the only woman, using the directors' lift. She felt it was impossible to inform some wholesalers who objected that she was indeed so entitled. "You can't", she told Katharine Whitehorn for a 1978 article, "when you are five foot one and a half." She survived at the Mirror so long "by being nice to people. Don't start arguments. People can either help or hinder you. Well, you are an idiot if you cause them to hinder you. So I'm very tactful - if you are tactful people are always ready to help you."

In 1978, she resigned after discovering that a new male journalist had been appointed to the board at £30,000, more than twice her own salary of £14,000. "Apparently, I was supposed to be honoured simply to be a director", she observed years later.

Meanwhile, in December 1977, Green joined Vidal Sassoon as managing director of operations in Europe and Executive Vice-President of the American company. Later she advised the board of the Telegraph and worked for the M&S (Marks & Spencer) magazine, which included interviewing Margaret Thatcher about her fashion interests. In the early 1990s Green was a senior lecturer in fashion journalism at the Central St. Martins College of Art and Design.

== Personal life and death ==
Green married the cigar importer Geoffrey Hill around 1952; the couple remained married until Hill died in 1992.

She was appointed an Officer of the Order of the British Empire (OBE) in the Queen's 2012 Birthday Honours for services to journalism.

Green died at her home in London on 10 September 2026, at the age of 100.
