= John Linnell the Younger =

British botanist (1822–1906)

- Born: 25 November 1821; London, U.K.
- Died: 4 April 1906 (aged 84); Redhill, Surrey, U.K.
- Occupations: Botanist; Entomologist; Artist; Teacher

John Linnell (1821–1906) also known as John Linnell the Younger or John Linnell junior was a British artist, botanist, lithographer, teacher, and entomologist. Linnell's father was the artist John Linnell (1792–1882), and he was a brother-in-law of the artist Samuel Palmer (1805–1881).

== Early life and education ==
Linnell's parents were the artist John Linnell (1792–1882) and Mary Anne Linnell (née Palmer, 1796–1865). John Linnell Senior was a religious non-conformist, and the couple had married in a Civil Ceremony in Scotland in 1817.

John Linnell junior was born at Cirencester Place, London, on 25 November 1821: the Linnell family resided at number 6. Cirencester Place was later renamed and its location corresponds today with the northern part of Great Titchfield Street in the West End.

John Jnr. was the oldest son of John and Mary, and he had eight other siblings, many of whom were also artists: Hannah (1818–1893, who married Samuel Palmer in 1837), Mary Elizabeth (known as Elizabeth or Eliza, 1820–1903), James Thomas (1823–1905), William (1826–1906), Mary (1828–1883), Sarah (1831–1917), Phebe (1835–1911, who married William Mackee in 1868) and Thomas George (1835–1911). Phebe and Thomas George were twins, recorded as being born on the same day.

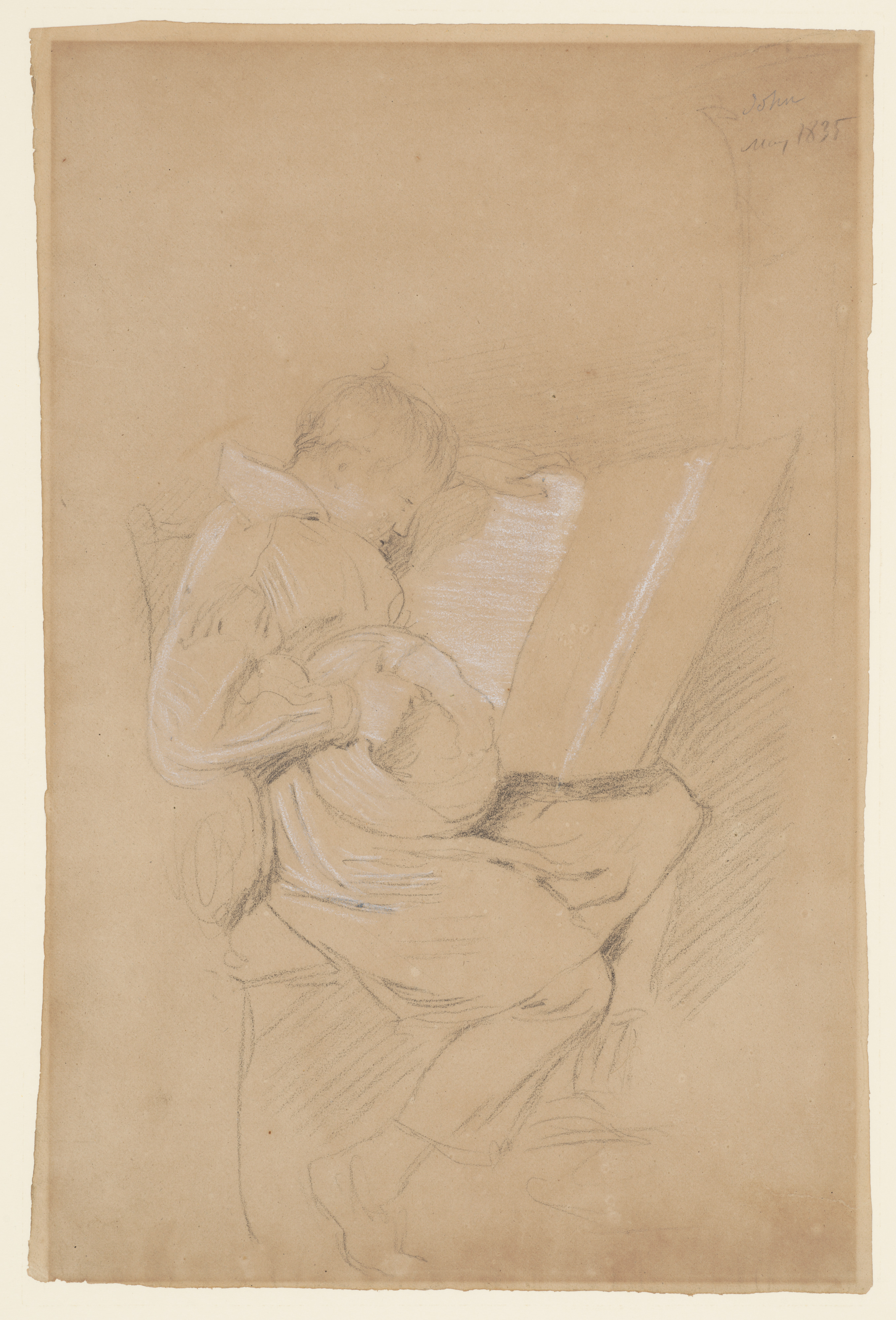
"Study of the artist's son, John", by John Linnell senior, made in May 1835

In May 1835, while the Linnell family were living at Bayswater, John Linnell Jnr. was sketched by his father in a portrait which is now part of the collection at the Metropolitan Museum of Art, with young John's country smock suggesting perhaps his father had caught him in his art studies, or working at the family's smallholding.

The Linnell family moved from London to Redhill, Surrey at the beginning of the 1850s, with John Linnell Snr. building a new residence named Redstone Wood in the Redstone area north of Redhill town (the house was completed in 1851). The unmarried adult Linnell children, including John Jnr., lived with their parents. John Linnell Snr. built two residences for his sons James and William close by to Redstone Wood, named Redstone Wood South [demolished in the interwar period] and Hillsbrow [demolished c. 1964]. After the death of John Linnell Snr. in 1882, John Linnell Jnr. lived with his sisters Elizabeth, Mary, and Sarah in Redstone Wood House.

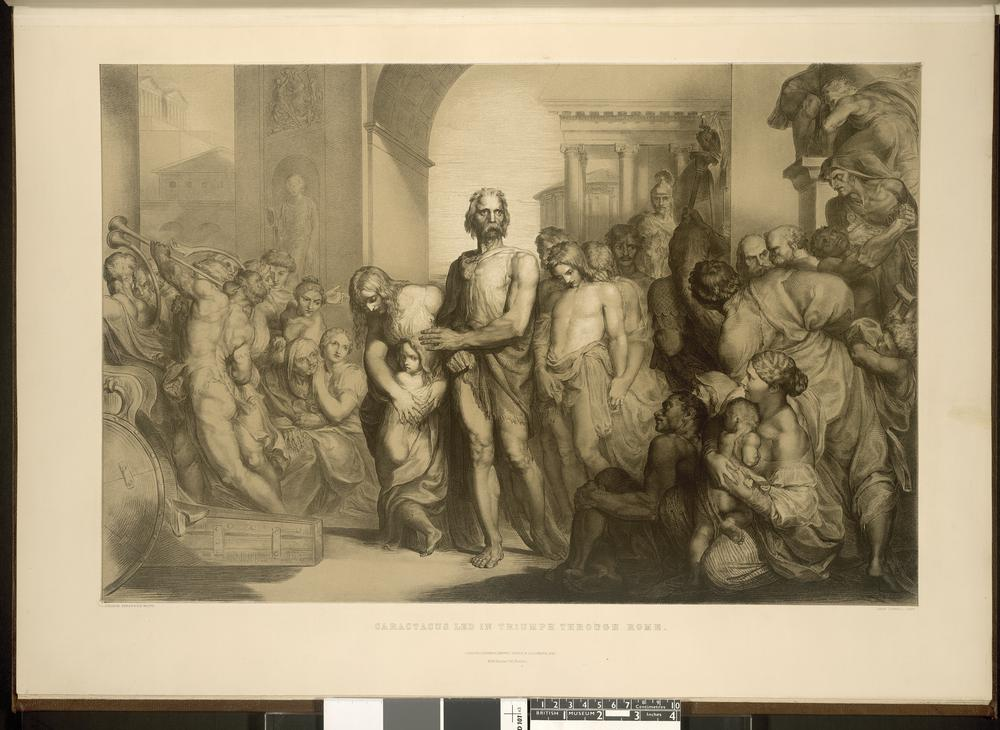
Caractacus led in triumph through Rome (BM 1854,1211.134). A print made by John Linnell the Younger after a work by George Frederic Watts.

== Career as an artist ==
John Linnell Jnr. and his brothers William and James Thomas Linnell all received art instruction at the Royal Academy Schools. During the late 1840s to the early 1850s John Jnr. was working as a printmaker making lithographs after works by established artists like George Frederic Watts, Joseph Severn and William Mulready, the latter of whom was a friend of John Linnell Snr.

Linnell also exhibited his work in public: on 12 August 1857, the American Consul and writer Nathaniel Hawthorne visited an exhibition in Manchester where he was particularly struck by one of Linnell's pictures:

I went to the exhibition on Wednesday with U-----, and looked at the pencil sketches of the old masters; also at the pictures generally, old and new. I particularly remember a landscape by John Linnell the younger. It is wonderfully good; so tender and fresh that the artist seems really to have caught the evanescent April and made her permanent. Here, at least, is eternal spring. [Nathaniel Hawthorne, English Notebooks, 1857]

To support himself in later life Linnell Jnr. worked as a drawing teacher. Linnell's friend Edward Saunders described his professional conduct like this: "a good artist, taking after the genius of his celebrated father, and as a teacher he was most patient and understanding." In the 1970s, Surrey Mirror local historian Guy Bingham specified that Linnell Jnr. had taught at Reigate Grammar School.

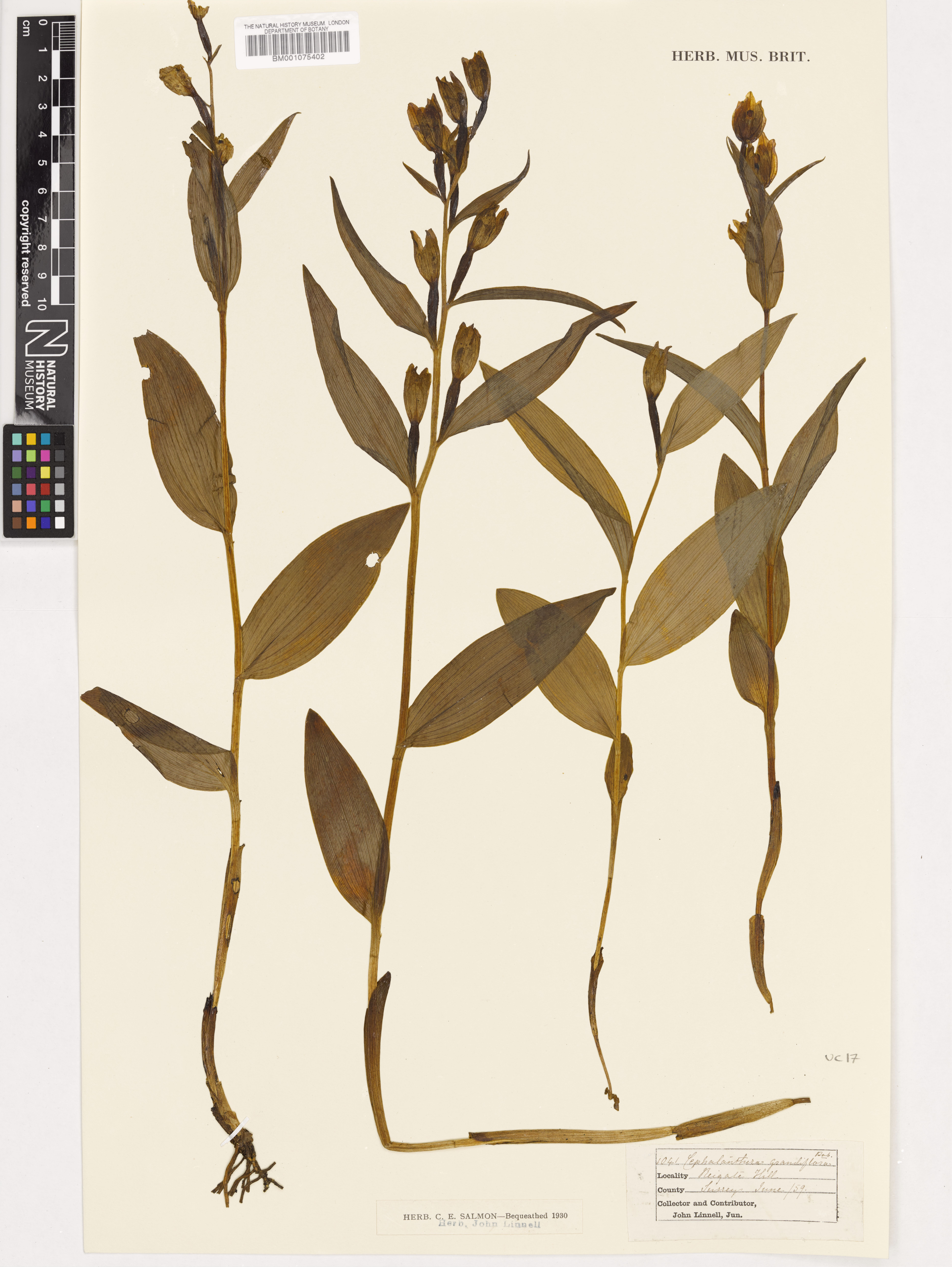
A specimen of Cephalanthera damasonium (Mill.) Druce collected at Reigate by John Linnell the younger in 1859 [BM001075402]

== Career as a naturalist ==
Linnell Jnr.'s botanical and entomological collecting activity concentrated around Surrey. Examples of specimens from Linnell's herbarium include a 'man orchid' Orchis anthropophora collected from Buckland in 1858, a musk orchid Herminium monorchis collected from Norbury Park in July 1859 and the orchid species Cephalanthera damasonium collected at Reigate in June 1859.

Edward Saunders recounted how he sometimes accompanied Linnell on beetle collecting trips in the neighborhood of Reigate and Redhill, searching for species which were known to live in sand pits (up until the twentieth century, the Reigate area was known for its sand mines).

In 1899 through the Holmesdale Natural History Club of Reigate, where he worked as a Curator, Linnell published a list of locally-found beetles from the family Staphylinidae.

== Death ==
John Linnell Jnr. died on 4 April 1906 at Redstone Wood House, and was laid to rest in the Linnell family plot at Reigate Cemetery. A contemporary report in the Surrey Mirror noted that Linnell's funeral was attended by his nieces and nephews and also "a number of old gardeners" who had worked for him.

== Legacy ==
After Linnell's death, his entomological collections were passed to his nephew Alfred Herbert Palmer (1853–1932) of Sennen in Cornwall. Some of Linnell's botanical specimens collected in the 1850s became part of the collection of the botanist Charles Edgar Salmon (1872–1930), a president of the Holmesdale Natural History Club, who bequeathed his herbarium to the Natural History Museum, London in 1930.

Lithographs created by Linnell Jnr. during the 1840s and early 1850s are held in the collection of the British Museum and the Metropolitan Museum of Art. The Metropolitan Museum of Art also has an 1866 photographic portrait of John Linnell the Younger by Elliott and Fry in their collection [as of September 2024, the portrait is catalogued but is not available to view online].

After the Second World War, Linnell's former Redhill home Redstone Wood house was demolished after having stood derelict for some time, and the site was later used as a sand quarry and developed for housing. Today the presence of the Linnell family in Redhill is commemorated by the street name Linnell Road.
