= John Wycliffe Linnell =

John Wycliffe Linnell FRCP MC
- John Wycliffe Linnell
- Born: 31 October 1878; Pavenham, Bedfordshire, England
- Died: 1 December 1967 (aged 89); Pavenham, Bedfordshire, England
- Occupation: Surgeon
- Known for: Military Cross; Cardiologist; Thyroid specialist

John Wycliffe Linnell FRCP MC (31 October 1878 – 1 December 1967) was Consulting Physician at the Metropolitan Hospital, Mildmay Mission Hospital and New End Hospital Hampstead.

== Biography ==
Linnell was born in Pavenham on 31 October 1878, the son of the Rev. John Edward Linnell. He was educated at Bedford Modern School, the University of London and St John’s College, Cambridge.

During World War I he served in France, Gallipoli and Egypt, attaining the rank of Major. He was mentioned in despatches and won a Military Cross.

After the war, Linnell became Medical Registrar at the London Hospital. His main interest at that point was cardiology and he worked with the esteemed cardiologists Sir James Mackenzie and Sir John Parkinson. Thereafter he was appointed Consulting Physician at the Metropolitan Hospital, Mildmay Mission Hospital and New End Hospital Hampstead. He was later to specialise in the thyroid gland and published several papers on the treatment of thyroid disorders. He became the founder of the Thyroid Club.

Linnell died in Pavenham, Bedfordshire on 1 December 1967.
