= John Linnell Bond =

English architect

John Linnell Bond (14 September 1764 – 6 November 1837) was an English architect.

== Life ==
Bond was educated at the Royal Academy, where he gained a gold medal in 1786. He occasionally exhibited at the academy up to 1797. After devoting some years to the study of ancient architecture in Italy and Greece he set up as an architect in London, and designed several large mansions.

Following a fire at Exton Hall in 1810, its owner, Sir Gerard Noel, moved into a nearby 17th century house, and commissioned Bond to make alterations. Bond also designed the Stamford Hotel, at Stamford, Lincolnshire for Noel. It is in the Greek revival style, with a giant order derived from the Choragic Monument of Lysicrates. Many other designs which he made for Noel were never carried out.

Bond also prepared an architectural design for the Strand Bridge - later known as Waterloo Bridge - in collaboration with the engineer George Dodd. The project was later taken over by John Rennie.

He contributed papers on architectural subjects to the Literary Gazette. He was well versed in the classics and made a translation of Vitruvius. He died in Newman Street, London. An obituary in the Gentleman's Magazine called him "one of the most peaceful and amiable of mankind".
