= Graeme Bond =

Australian rules footballer

Personal information
- Born: 27 November 1949 (age 76); St Omer Private Hospital, Camberwell, Victoria
- Original team: Burwood United Juniors
- Height: 175 cm (5 ft 9 in)
- Weight: 76 kg (168 lb)

Playing career^{1}
Years	Club	Games (Goals)
1967–1977	Richmond	115 (61)
1977–1980	St Kilda	56 (28)
Total		171 (89)
- ^{1} Playing statistics correct to the end of 1980.

Career highlights
- Richmond Premiership Player 1969

Graeme Bond (born 27 November 1949) is a former Australian rules football player who played in the VFL for both the Richmond Football Club and the St Kilda Football Club.

== Family ==
The son of Ray Salmond Bond (1918-2010), and Lily Pauline Bond (1916-2003), née Bedford, Graeme Bond was born at the St Omer Private Hospital, in Prospect Hill Road, Camberwell, Victoria on 27 November 1949.

== Footballer ==
=== Richmond (VFL) ===
Having begun playing with the Richmond Third XVIII in 1966, and the Richmond Second XVIII in 1967, he played with the Richmond First XVII in two separate stints: between 1967 and 1973, and between 1975 and 1977. Altogether he played in 201 games for the Richmond Football Club: Thirds, 17 games; Seconds, 69 games; and Firsts, 115 games.

=== Dandenong (VFA) ===
He played 8 games for Dandenong (kicking 22 goals) in 1973.

=== St Kilda (VFL) ===
He played for St Kilda from mid-1977 until 1980 for the St Kilda Football Club.

=== Frankston (VFA) ===
He played 7 games for Frankston (kicking 9 goals) in 1981.

== Athlete ==
An accomplished professional sprinter and winner of the Dandenong, Leongatha, and Maryborough Gifts. He finished second in the (130 yards) Dandenong Gift on Sunday, 17 December 1967, the day that Australian Prime Minister, Harold Holt, disappeared while swimming at Cheviot Beach.

== Post-football ==
In 1989 he joined 3AW as a football commentator and now mainly acts as an analyser of football statistics.
