= Dennis Bond =

English footballer (1947–2025)

Personal information
- Full name: Dennis Joseph Thomas Bond
- Date of birth: 17 March 1947
- Place of birth: Walthamstow, England
- Date of death: 2 March 2025 (aged 77)
- Height: 5 ft 7 in (1.70 m)
- Position: Midfielder

Senior career*
Years	Team	Apps	(Gls)
1964–1966	Watford	93	(17)
1967–1970	Tottenham Hotspur	23	(1)
1970–1972	Charlton Athletic	75	(3)
1972–1977	Watford	179	(21)
Total		370	(42)
- * Club domestic league appearances and goals

Dennis Joseph Thomas Bond (17 March 1947 – 2 March 2025) was an English professional footballer who played as a midfielder for Watford, Tottenham Hotspur, Charlton Athletic and represented England at School and Youth level.

== Career ==
Bond joined Watford as an apprentice in March 1964. The midfielder made 93 appearances and scored 17 goals between 1964 and 1967 in his first spell with the Hornets. He joined Tottenham Hotspur in March 1967 in a then record £30,000 transfer deal for the Hertfordshire club. Bond, a skilful and neat passer of the ball featured in 27 matches and found the net once in all competitions. The highlight of his White Hart Lane career was when he featured in a European Cup Winners' Cup match against Olympique Lyonnais in December 1967. In October 1970 he transferred to Charlton Athletic where he went on to make a further 75 appearances and netted three goals.

Bond returned to Watford in February 1973, initially on loan. He played 179 matches and scored on 21 occasions in his second spell with the club. After leaving Watford in 1978, Bond played Non-league football for Dagenham, Highfield Sports, Boreham Wood and Waltham Abbey.

== Death ==
Dennis Bond died on 2 March 2025, at the age of 77.
