= Sir Thomas Bond, 1st Baronet =

English landowner

Sir Thomas Bond, 1st Baronet (c. 1620–1685) was an English landowner and Comptroller of the household of Queen Henrietta Maria.

== Biography ==
The son of Dr. Thomas Bond (1580–1662), by his marriage to Catherine, daughter of John Osbaldeston, Bond was born about 1620 at Peckham. The exact dates of his birth, death and marriage are unknown.

On 9 October 1658, before the Restoration of the monarchy in 1660, Bond was created by King Charles II a Baronet in the Baronetage of England. He also became Comptroller of the household of Queen Henrietta Maria, the mother of Charles II, an appointment which it was suggested he had obtained by the payment of one thousand pistoles, a very large sum, to Henry Jermyn, a favourite of the Queen who had recently been created Earl of St Albans.

After the Restoration, Bond had a house in Pall Mall, assessed for Hearth Tax in 1674 as having 20 hearths, and a country estate in Peckham and Camberwell. He also owned land in Yorkshire, at Kirkby Malham, Malham Dale, and Fountains Fell. He bought a large estate from his brother-in-law Sir Thomas Crymes (or Grimes), Baronet, and Westminster's Bond Street is named after one of his developments. He built a new manor house at Peckham, long since demolished and now the site of Peckham Hill Street. After his death, his estate was plundered by "a fanatic Whig mob".

Sir Thomas Bond was buried on 3 June 1685, in Saint Giles Church, Camberwell.

== Marriage ==
Bond married a French woman, Marie de la Garde (died 1696), a daughter of Charles Peliot, Sieur de la Garde, of Paris, one of the maids of the Queen Mother's privy chamber. They had two sons, Henry (died childless 1721) and Thomas (died 1732), who respectively succeeded in the baronetcy, and a daughter, Mary Charlotte (c. 1656–1708), who married Sir William Gage, 2nd Baronet of Hengrave Hall in Suffolk.

== Arms and motto ==
The arms of the Bond family (argent, on a chevron sable three bezants) and their crest (a winged demi-horse ensigned with six stars), with the motto Orbis non sufficit ("The world is not enough"), were emblazoned in a window of the church of St Giles, Camberwell, destroyed by a fire in the 19th century.

The phrase orbis non sufficit is thought to originate from the Pharsalia by Lucan. It appears twice, both with uncomplimentary associations: the first reference is to a group of villainous mutineers, and the second is to the ambitious Julius Caesar. It was then applied to Alexander the Great by Juvenal in his collection of satirical poems, the Satires: "The world was not big enough for Alexander the Great, but a coffin was". This motto was also used previously by Philip II of Spain. A medal struck in 1583 bore the inscriptions PHILIPP II HISP ET NOVI ORBIS REX ("Philip II, King of Spain and the New World") and NON SUFFICIT ORBIS ("The world is not enough").

== Mention in Pepys ==
Bond is mentioned in the diary of Samuel Pepys, in the entry for 26 December, Boxing Day, 1660, some months after the Restoration.

In the morning to Alderman Backwell's for the candlesticks for Mr. Coventry, but they being not done I went away, and so by coach to Mr. Crew's, and there took some money of Mr. Moore's for my Lord, and so to my Lord's, where I found Sir Thomas Bond (whom I never saw before) with a message from the Queen about vessells for the carrying over of her goods ...

== Legacy ==
Bond Street, Westminster, is named after Bond. However, he may be best known today as the supposed ancestor of the fictional spy James Bond. His family motto Orbis non sufficit is shown as Bond's family motto in the film On Her Majesty's Secret Service, and also became the title for the Bond film The World Is Not Enough.

== Sources ==
- B. H. Johnson, From Berkeley Square to Bond Street - the Early History of the Neighbourhood (London: John Murray & London Topographical Society, 1952)
- Philip Crymes, C(h)rimes C(h)rymes (London: 1985)

Baronetage of England
New creation	Baronet (of Peckham); 1658–1685	Succeeded by Henry Bond
