= Bond baronets =

Extinct baronetcy in the Baronetage of Ireland

There have been two baronetcies created for persons with the surname Bond, such as the Baronetage of England.

The Bond Baronetcy, of Peckham in the County of Surrey, was created in the Baronetage of England on 9 October 1658 for Thomas Bond, Comptroller of the Household of Queen Henrietta Maria. The 2nd Baronet represented Portarlington in the Irish House of Commons. The title became extinct on the death of the fourth Baronet in 1767.

The Bond Baronetcy, of Coolamber in the County of Longford, was created in the Baronetage of Ireland on 21 January 1794 for James Bond, who represented Naas in the Irish House of Commons. The title became extinct on the death of the second Baronet in 1823.

== Bond baronets, of Peckham (1658) ==
Escutcheon of the Bond baronets of Peckham

- Sir Thomas Bond, 1st Baronet (died 1685)
- Sir Henry Bond, 2nd Baronet (died 1721)
- Sir Thomas Bond, 3rd Baronet (1709–1734)
- Sir Charles Bond, 4th Baronet (1734–1767)

== Bond baronets, of Coolamber (1794) ==
Escutcheon of the Bond baronets of Coolamber

- Sir James Bond, 1st Baronet (1744–1820)
  - James Hornby Bond (died 1792)
- Sir Thomas Bond, 2nd Baronet (1776–1823)
