= List of alumni of Central Saint Martins =

This is a list of notable people who have studied at Central Saint Martins since its formation in 1989 by amalgamation of the Central School of Art and Design and Saint Martin's School of Art.

For alumni of the original schools before the merger, please see the List of alumni of the Central School of Art and Design and List of alumni of Saint Martin's School of Art.

== A ==
- Faisal Abdu'Allah
- Kossi Aguessy
- Sadik Ahmed
- Bora Aksu
- AL and AL (performance art)
- Johan Andersson
- Eugene Ankomah
- Estrella Archs
- Kali Arulpragasam
- Daniel Askill
- Tom Aspaul
- Ed Atkins
- Dana Awartani

== B ==
- Faris Badwan
- Elena Bajo
- Bobby Baker
- Luella Bartley
- Sarah Beddington
- Sunara Begum
- Laura Belém
- Antonio Berardi
- Sara Berman
- Wales Bonner
- Phoebe Boswell
- Jason Brooks
- Jessica Brown Findlay
- Miriam Buether
- Jay Burridge
- Sarah Burton

== C ==
- Bonnie Camplin
- Jane Carr
- Robert Cary-Williams
- Paolo Carzana
- Charlie Casely-Hayford
- Ella Catliff
- Hussein Chalayan
- Li Chevalier
- Madeleine Child
- Sandra Choi
- Jarvis Cocker
- Michal Cole
- Sacha Craddock

== D ==
- Giles Deacon
- Richard Deacon
- Danielle Dean
- Heavenli Denton
- Es Devlin
- Amelia Dimoldenberg
- Emma Dodd
- Jonny Dodge
- Lina Dorado (film-maker)
- Mich Dulce
- Nic Dunlop

== E ==
- Sarah Edwards, Member of Parliament elected in 2023

== F ==
- Paloma Faith
- Anna Fleischle (stage designer)
- Frankmusik
- Rie fu

== G ==
- John Galliano
- Babak Ganjei
- Nick Gentry (artist)
- Opashona Ghosh
- Gilbert & George
- Noémie Goudal
- Ferry Gouw
- Craig Green

== H ==
- Luke Edward Hall
- Michael van der Ham
- Michael Halpern (fashion designer)
- Katharine Hamnett
- PJ Harvey
- Tim Hatley (theatre designer)
- Giles Hattersley
- Emma Healey (novelist)
- Nadia Hebson
- HK119
- Rachael House
- Rok Hwang
- Henry Hudson
- Lutz Huelle
- Frieda Hughes

== I ==
- Roksanda Ilinčić

== J ==
- Anthony James
- Charles Jeffrey (fashion designer)
- Richard E. Jennings (comic book artist)
- Peter Jensen
- Clare Johnson (artist, writer)
- Masato Jones
- Stephen Jones

== K ==
- Christopher Kane
- Mary Katrantzou
- Jane Kelly
- Darren Kennedy
- Annie Kevans (artist)
- Rachel Khoo (chef)
- Kissy Sell Out (graphic designer)
- Sophia Kokosalaki
- David Koma
- Kiko Kostadinov
- Matthew Krishanu
- Eleni Kyriacou
- Egor Kraft

== L ==
- Dimitri Launder (artist)
- Frank Leder
- Daniel Lee
- Tanya Ling
- Chet Lo (fashion designer)
- Cathy Lomax (artist)
- Todd Lynn

== M ==
- Masha Ma
- Goshka Macuga (artist)
- Aida Mahmudova
- Jennie Maizels
- Richard Malone
- Martin Maloney
- Shantell Martin (visual artist)
- Nabel Martins (fashion designer)
- Michal Martychowiec (artist)
- Reba Maybury
- Stella McCartney
- Gary McKendry
- Joss McKinley
- Alexander McQueen
- M.I.A.
- Alex Michon
- Ruth Millar
- Savannah Miller
- MRK

== N ==
- Navia Nguyen (model)
- Niyi
- Nima Nourizadeh
- Sonja Nuttall

== O ==
- Mowalola Ogunlesi
- Joshua Oppenheimer (film director)
- Rifat Ozbek

== P ==
- Anita Pallenberg
- Elisa Palomino
- Laura Pannack
- Sohee Park
- Phoebe Philo
- Andy Picci
- Zac Posen
- Laure Prouvost (artist; Turner Prize winner)
- Gareth Pugh
- Marcella Puppini

== R ==
- Sara Rahbar
- Jo Ratcliffe
- Harris Reed (fashion designer)
- Marcus Reeves
- Emma Rendel (artist)
- Clements Ribeiro
- Jatun Risba (artist)
- Lucinda Rogers
- Tal Rosner

== S ==
- Bilarab bin Haitham Al Said (Omani royal)
- Jonathan Saunders
- Burkhard Schittny (visual artist)
- Christopher Shannon
- Raqib Shaw
- Ed Skrein
- Anna Sorokin
- Teresa Nunes Alves de Sousa
- Anna Span (pornographic film producer)
- Helga Stentzel
- Stuart Stockdale
- Isabella Summers
- Tamar and Natasha Surguladze

== T ==
- Lucy Tammam
- Wendy Tan White (entrepreneur)
- Jeremy Tankard (type designer)
- Riccardo Tisci
- Mark Titchner (artist)

== V ==
- Elise Valmorbida
- Tom Vek
- Henrik Vibskov
- Lotta Volkova

== W ==
- Suling Wang (artist)
- Anoma Wijewardene (artist)
- Matthew Williamson
- Louise Wilson
- Joe Wright (filmmaker)
- Hanna Werning (art designer)

== Y ==
- Yeule
- Esme Young

== Z ==
- Haris Zambarloukos
- Natasha Zinko
