= Andrew Groves =

British fashion designer (born 1968)

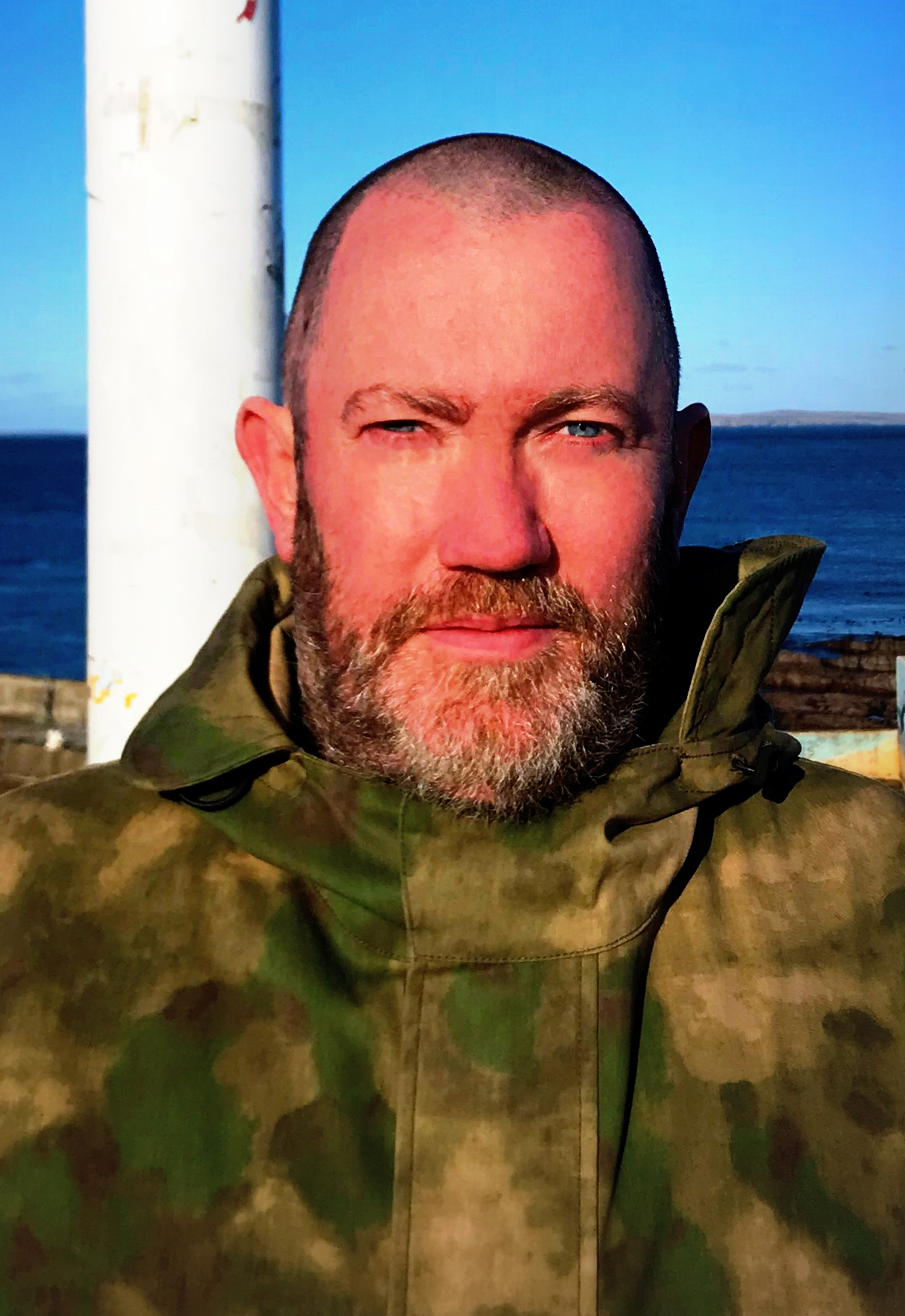
- Born: Andrew Groves; 27 February 1968 (age 58); Maidstone, Kent, England
- Occupations: Designer, academic

Academic background
- Education: Central Saint Martins

Academic work
- Institutions: University of Westminster
- Main interests: Fashion design, Menswear, Archives
- Website: www.andrewgroves.com

Andrew Groves (born 27 February 1968) is a British professor of fashion design, currently based at the University of Westminster, where he is the director of the Westminster Menswear Archive, the world's first publicly accessible menswear archive. His former students include Ashley Williams, Claire Barrow, Liam Hodges, Roberta Einer and Priya Ahluwalia.

== Career ==
=== Academic ===
Groves is Professor of Fashion Design at the University of Westminster and is the director of the Westminster Menswear Archive. He was the course director for the BA Fashion Design course between 2003 and 2019. Alumni of the course include Christopher Bailey, Stuart Vevers, Markus Lupfer, Liam Hodges, Ashley Williams, Claire Barrow, and Roberta Einer. He is the director of the Westminster Menswear Archive, which he launched in 2015. It holds over 2000 examples of British menswear including garments from Craig Green, Joe Casely-Hayford, Kim Jones, Aitor Throup, Vivienne Westwood, Nigel Cabourn, and Meadham Kirchhoff.

In 2016 he developed the MA Menswear programme, the world's first and only two-year menswear course which shows at London Fashion Week Mens.

In 2018 the University of Westminster BA Fashion Design course became the first undergraduate course to show on schedule at London Fashion Week.

In 2019 he co-curated the exhibition Invisible Men: An Anthology from the Westminster Menswear Archive, the UK's largest exhibition devoted to menswear, featuring over 170 garments to explore the past 120 years of British menswear.

Groves sits on the steering committee of the British Fashion Council's Colleges Council, which advises the British Fashion Council on education issues.

=== Design ===
Before worked as the head assistant to Alexander McQueen between 1994 and 1996, while also designing under the pseudonym 'Jimmy Jumble'. He graduated from the MA Fashion Design course at Central Saint Martins in 1997 and launched his label, Andrew Groves, showing at London Fashion Week between 1997 and 2000. The confrontational themes of his collections at London Fashion Week ensured that he caught people's attention and enhanced his notoriety. His first scheduled show at LFW in February 1998 was titled "Ourselves Alone" (translated from the Gaelic "Sinn Féin") and referred to The Troubles in Ireland, combining the colours of the rival factions of Irish unionists and Irish republicans. The models wore orange sashes, grey suits, and charred green taffeta, with one model setting herself on fire during the show. Erected outside the show, were 30-foot burning crucifixes.

His following show in September 1998 "Cocaine Nights", (named after J.G. Ballard's novel, and also inspired by the film Face/Off) had the models walking on a catwalk spread with sugar-like cocaine with a model wearing a dress made of razor blades. At the time, Bill Clinton, then President of the United States, had condemned the fashion industry for glamorising drug use, so this was seen as a deliberate provocation.

In addition to his runway collections, Groves created costumes for Robbie Williams, Kylie Minogue, Suede, and The Spice Girls. He has worked freelance as a creative consultant for fashion design companies in the UK and Japan, and as a design consultant for companies such as Nokia, Wedgwood, and The Coca-Cola Company.

The National Collection of Textiles and Fashion at the Victoria & Albert Museum, and at the Fashion Museum in Bath both hold examples of Groves designs.
