= Supriya Lele =

British-Indian designer

- Born: 1987 (age 38–39)
- Education: University of Edinburgh; Royal College of Art
- Label: Supriya Lele
- Awards: Finalist, LVMH Prize (2020)
- Website: supriyalele.com

Supriya Lele (born 1987) is a British fashion designer. She founded her eponymous London-based label in 2016, after completing an MA at the Royal College of Art. Her work draws on the dialogue between her Indian heritage and her British cultural identity. In 2020 she was a finalist for the LVMH Prize, whose 300,000 euro fund was divided equally among the eight finalists after the final was cancelled because of the COVID-19 pandemic. In 2023, she was one of four designers enlisted by Victoria's Secret for its reimagined runway show, and she returned to London Fashion Week that September after an 18-month absence.

== Early life and education ==
Lele was born in 1987 to Indian parents who had moved to the United Kingdom before she was born, and she grew up in Meriden, West Midlands. Both of her parents are from India's central region, her mother from Nagpur and her father from Jabalpur, and the family took yearly trips to India during the holidays. Her parents were both medics: her mother is a clinical director and her late father was a consultant specialist surgeon. Coming from a family of doctors, her parents once suggested she become a lawyer, but she was stronger in the arts at school.

Lele enrolled at the University of Edinburgh to study architecture, but switched to an art foundation course after a year. After graduating, she spent a few years working for fashion houses including Nicole Farhi and Roksanda in London and New York. She went on to complete an MA in womenswear at the Royal College of Art in July 2016.

== Career ==
Lele founded her label in 2016, after completing her MA. Her MA collection caught the eye of Fashion East director Lulu Kennedy, and in 2017 Lele made her London Fashion Week debut as part of the Fashion East show, with a presentation at Tate Modern. She showed under the Fashion East scheme for three seasons before being awarded full NewGen sponsorship from the British Fashion Council in 2018.

Lele staged her first standalone show in September 2019, for the Spring/Summer 2020 season. Her first campaign, shot by Jamie Hawkesworth, was released the same month, and Hawkesworth shot a follow-up campaign in 2020. She later self-published "Narmada", a book made in collaboration with Hawkesworth, and worked with documentary photographer Sohrab Hura on her Spring/Summer 2022 campaign.

In 2020, Lele was a finalist for the LVMH Prize for Young Fashion Designers; after the final was cancelled because of the pandemic, the prize fund was divided equally among the eight finalists, four of them London-based. Her Fall/Winter 2022 show in February 2022, held at the Old Selfridges Hotel, drew front-row guests including Victoria Beckham, and Paloma Elsesser walked the runway. That year, Lele's clothes appeared on two Vogue covers: Zinnia Kumar wore a green look on the January 2022 issue of Vogue India, and Yasmin Finney wore an azure minidress from the Fall/Winter 2022 collection on the December 2022 issue of British Vogue. In 2022, she was added to the BoF 500, The Business of Fashion's list of people shaping the fashion industry.

In 2023, Lele was one of four designers enlisted by Victoria's Secret for its reimagined runway show; she produced eleven looks for the project and worked alongside stylist Camilla Nickerson. In May 2023, she opened Qrystal Partners, a gallery in a former pharmacy in Camberwell, south London, with Donald Ryan and Parinaz Mogadassi. Lele returned to the London Fashion Week schedule in September 2023, after an 18-month absence, showing her Spring/Summer 2024 collection at the Barbican Centre; the collection included her first accessories and her first knitwear, and used leather off-cuts sourced from Bentley Motors. For Fall/Winter 2024, she skipped the formal show schedule and presented the collection through private appointments at the Qrystal Partners space. Reviewing the collection, Sarah Mower of Vogue called the clothes "skimpy, but with fashion substance".

== Design approach ==
The LVMH Prize describes Lele's approach to textiles, cut and fabrication as "deliberately lo-fi and subversive". She has said she looks at her culture "from a skeletal perspective", reworking elements such as sari draping, bleached dupion silk, and Madras checks into sheer, pared-back garments. Her designs frequently play on concealing and revealing the body, an idea she has traced back to the sari.
