= Lulu Kennedy =

UK based fashion designer and magazine editor

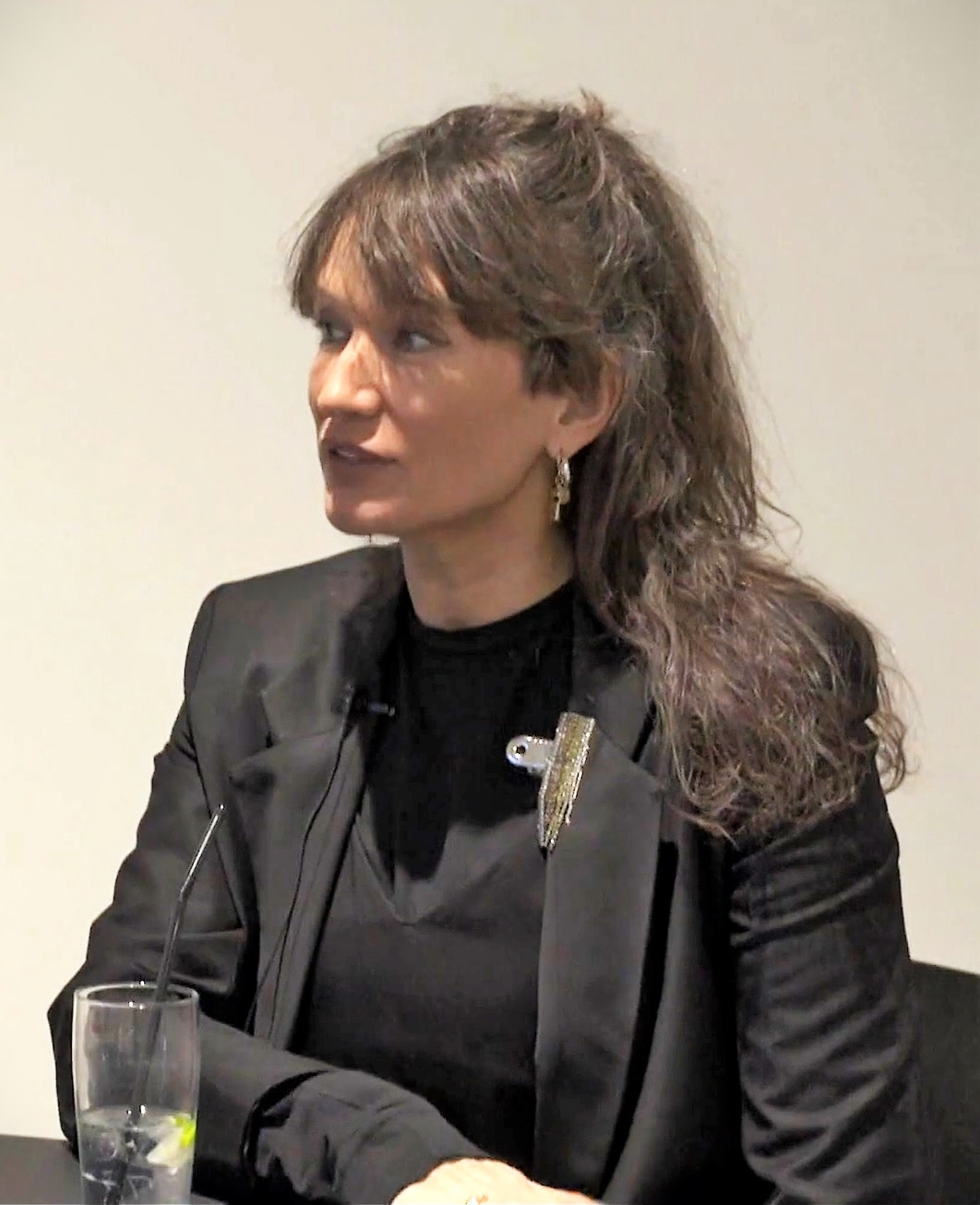
Kennedy at the Copenhagen International Fashion Fair in 2017

Lulu Kennedy is a British fashion designer who is the founder and director of Fashion East & MAN & the Lulu & Co clothing line. She is also editor-at-large of Condé Nast's biannual LOVE magazine as well as working as a consultant for brands.

== Early life ==
Born in 1969, Lulu Kennedy grew up between Ibiza, Devon, & Sicily, spending the early 1990s, a decade she was heavily influenced by, working on raves in Naples, Italy. Upon returning to the UK in 1995, she got a job in a vintage shop at Kensington Market and found herself drawn into fashion.

== Career ==
In 1996 Kennedy started working for the owners of the Old Truman Brewery on Brick Lane in East London. Together in 2000 they launched a non-profit initiative, Fashion East, dedicated to scouting and nurturing young designers, enabling them to show at London Fashion Week.

She set up MAN in 2005 in partnership with Topman – an identical support scheme for emerging menswear designers. Kennedy launched Jonathan Saunders, House of Holland, Roksanda Ilincic, Gareth Pugh, Richard Nicoll, Christopher Shannon, Charles Jeffrey, and Craig Green.

Kennedy launched her own clothing brand Lulu & Co in 2010 to mark Fashion East's 10th anniversary. Initially created as a limited edition capsule collection of ten archive dresses by ten Fashion East designers, Kennedy went on to develop the line in house, often collaborating with friends such as artists Tim Noble & Sue Webster, Barry Reigate, Bella Freud & Susie Bick, art director Boyo Studio, and photographer Mary McCartney. It is carried internationally at stockists including Liberty and Net-a-Porter.

== Personal life ==
Kennedy was married to artist and photographer Mat Collishaw from 2007 to 2008.

Kennedy's daughter was born in March 2014. They live in East London.
