= Fashion East =

Fashion East is a non-profit designer support and showcasing scheme, a project established by the Old Truman Brewery and Lulu Kennedy MBE in 2000. Designers can apply for support across three different programmes. Each programme offers fashion week showcasing opportunities, business mentoring & financial sponsorship for menswear and womenswear designers. Designers are selected by Lulu Kennedy and a panel of industry people.

Fashion East has supported and launched brands including: JW Anderson, Gareth Pugh, Jonathan Saunders, Roksanda Ilincic, Richard Nicoll, House of Holland, Cassette Playa, Christopher Shannon, Nasir Mazhar, Martine Rose, Marques'Almeida, Claire Barrow, Charles Jeffrey, Craig Green, and Maximilian Davis.. Fashion East has also worked with Kim Jones (now Creative Director of Dior Homme), Judy Blame and Gosha Rubchinskiy as special guests.

== Fashion East Womenswear ==
Each season the Fashion East womenswear scheme offers three designers the opportunity to present a collection to international press and buyers on schedule at London Fashion Week. Designers also receive business mentoring, financial sponsorship and inclusion in a top Paris sales showroom.

Womenswear designers are selected by Lulu Kennedy and a panel of womenswear industry people including: Brix Smith-Start (Owner, START Boutique), Charlie Harrington (Stylist & Creative Director), Charlie Porter (Men’s Fashion Critic, Financial Times), Francesca Burns (Contributing Fashion Editor, British Vogue), Kay Barron (Fashion Features Director, Net-a-Porter), Lauren Cochrane (Assistant Fashion Editor, The Guardian), Mandi Lennard (PR & Consultant, Mandi’s Basement), Richard Sloan (Creative Consultant & Stylist) and Sarah Mower (Contributing Editor, Vogue USA).

Topshop has been the headline sponsor of Fashion East's womenswear scheme since 2003. Fashion East also receives funding from the Greater London Authority.

== Fashion East & Topman’s MAN ==
In September 2005 the team behind Fashion East launched ‘MAN’ in partnership with Topman. The joint initiative is an identical support scheme for three emerging menswear designers to showcase their work via a group catwalk show at London Collections Men. This was the first menswear scheme of its kind. Starting with a place on London's womenswear schedule, by September 2009 MAN began London's first menswear day of shows and is now credited with the launch of London Collections Men in June 2012.

Menswear designers are selected by Lulu Kennedy and a panel of menswear industry people including: Andrew Davis (Men’s Fashion Director, Wonderland Magazine), Ben Reardon (Editor, Man About Town), Charlie Porter (Men’s Fashion Critic, Financial Times), Gordon Richardson (Creative director, Topman), Luke Day (Editor, GQ Style), Sam Lobban (Contemporary Buyer, Mr Porter) and Tim Blanks (Editor-at-Large, Style.com).

== Fashion East Men’s Presentations ==
In February 2009 Fashion East introduced their Fashion East Men's Presentations (formerly known as Menswear Installations) as an accompaniment to the MAN show for London Fashion Week's first menswear showcase (Autumn/Winter 2009). The first London menswear showcase was co-curated by Fashion East's founder & director Lulu Kennedy with the British Fashion Council.

The showcase spearheaded London Fashion Week's first menswear day in September 2009 (Spring/Summer 2010) and in June 2012, MAN, Fashion East and Lulu Kennedy were credited as the catalyst in the launch of London Collections Men (Spring/Summer 2013). Fashion East Men's Presentations gives additional menswear designers a platform to present their collections in a group exhibition at London Collections Men.

== Venues ==
Fashion East has held events at many venues across London including: Old Truman Brewery, Tate Modern's Turbine Hall and Tate Tanks, Natural History Museum, Institute of Contemporary Arts, Electric Ballroom, Curzon Mayfair Cinema, Haunch of Venison Gallery and Blacks Members Club Soho. Internationally, Fashion East has hosted events in Moscow and Paris, including a collaboration with Colette in Paris.
