= Charles Jeffrey (fashion designer) =

Scottish fashion designer

Charles Jeffery
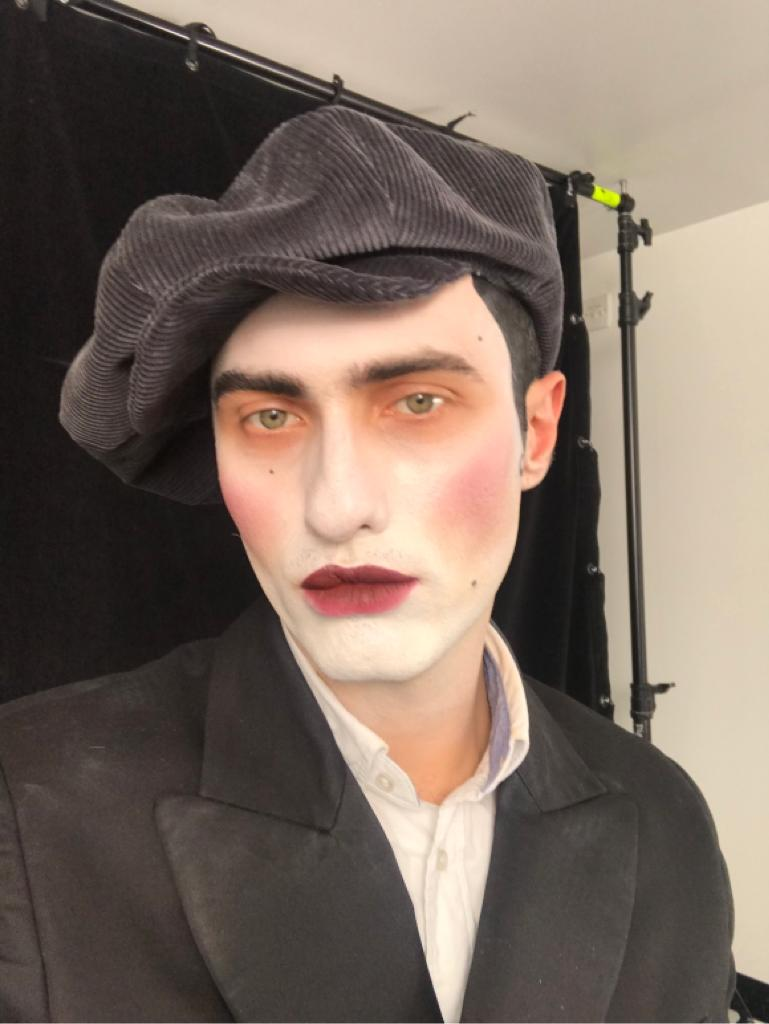
- Jeffery in 2019
- Born: Charles Jeffery; 1 August 1990; Bellshill, North Lanarkshire, Scotland
- Education: Central Saint Martins (BA) (MA)
- Occupations: Fashion designer; couturier
- Years active: 2015-present

Charles Jeffrey (born 1 August 1990) is a Scottish fashion designer known for his punk-inspired, gender-fluid designs influenced by his Scottish heritage and London's queer club scene.

Jeffrey launched his label Charles Jeffrey LOVERBOY in 2015, after graduating from Central St Martins. He has been nominated for and won numerous industry awards. Charles Jeffrey LOVERBOY has been worn by figures as wide-ranging as Harry Styles, Tilda Swinton, Bimini Bon Boulash, and K-pop star J-Hope of BTS. Jeffrey has been described as "speaking to young London the way Alexander McQueen spoke to his generation," and by Vogue as "the upholder of all that is human, creative and cheerful about British fashion."

== Early life and education ==
Charles Jeffrey was born 1 August 1990 in Bellshill, North Lanarkshire. As a child he moved frequently, due to his father being in the British Army, living in Germany, England and Wales. He spent his teenage years in Cumbernauld. Jeffrey drew from a young age, and became interested in fashion as a teenager. At eighteen, he moved to London.

Jeffrey studied for an Art Foundation BA and an MA in Fashion at Central St Martins, where he was tutored by Louise Wilson, who had also tutored Christopher Kane and Alexander McQueen. As a student, Jeffrey interned for four months at Dior's haute couture ateliers in Paris. Jeffrey's graduation show at Central St Martins in 2015 attracted the attention of Fashion East Director Lulu Kennedy. He was also named as one of the "3 designers to watch" out of that year's graduates by Vogue, with his collection described as "an exciting new amalgamation of pop and provocation". It was also during his MA at Central St Martins that Charles Jeffrey developed the Charles Jeffery LOVERBOY label, which emerged from a monthly club night of the same name that Jeffrey began at Vogue Fabrics in Dalston.

== Career ==
Having caught the attention of Lulu Kennedy at his graduation show in February 2015, Charles Jeffrey's work was showcased in a presentation at the Institute of Contemporary Arts as part of Fashion East's and Topman's joint talent platform MAN, at London Collections: Men (now London Fashion Week Men's) in June 2015. Jeffrey said the platform changed his life: “Had Lulu [Kennedy, Fashion East founder] and Natasha [Booth] not encouraged me to be braver, smarter, and taught me so much of what I now know, my label wouldn't exist." Jeffrey would continue to show as part of Fashion East and Topman's MAN for three seasons, until his first solo show in June 2017. In 2016, Charles Jeffrey was included on the Business of Fashion 500 list as one of the most influential people in fashion. Jeffrey's shows for LOVERBOY have gained a reputation for being theatrical performances as well as fashion shows, often working with theatre and dance professionals. His "Tantrum" show in 2017, working with director Theo Adams, was described as "one of those shows that will be talked about for years."

In November 2017, Charles Jeffrey's first solo exhibition, THE COME UP, opened at the NOW Gallery in Greenwich. Incorporating Jeffrey's "emotive and vibrant illustrations" with "large sculptural pieces hang[ing] from the gallery's seven-meter ceiling," the installation was "an interactive and three-dimensional representation of the Charles Jeffrey LOVERBOY brand and cult club night." Jeffrey has contributed as editor and creative director to several editions of LOVE Magazine, including a Maison Margiela retrospective shoot (in collaboration with John Galliano), and as Creative Director of a Vivienne Westwood archive story for Another Man. In December 2017, Jeffrey won the British Fashion Award's Emerging Talent: Menswear Award.

In 2018, Charles Jeffrey LOVERBOY launched its first womenswear capsule collection, Awrite Hen? exclusively for Matches Fashion. ""The women in my life have been wearing our collections since the beginning but it's been a thrill to develop these pieces specifically with a woman in mind," Jeffrey commented. In October 2018, Jeffrey won the GQ Man of the Year Award for Breakthrough Designer.

With the COVID-19 pandemic forcing London Fashion Week to hold its first digital fashion week in 2020, Jeffrey used the occasion to raise money for UK Black Pride, in light of rising consciousness around the Black Lives Matter movement. Jeffrey held a live-streamed fundraiser from the basement of Vogue Fabrics, where the LOVERBOY club nights began, spotlighting Black artists, performers, and fashion designers from his extended queer community. Jeffrey said of his decision, "Loverboy's always been a happening, a place where people club together to do something great...I thought if I could do it then, I can do it now.”

In 2021, Theatre Royal Drury Lane owners, Andrew and Madeleine Lloyd Webber, commissioned Jeffrey to redesign the uniforms worn by the theater's hospitality staff, known as the Red Coats, as part of the venue's ￡60 million restoration. The redesign consisted of a red tartan, frock coat, paired with either trousers or a kilt worn over a white dress shirt. Jeffrey said the design drew on theatre's art collection, including costume illustrations by Cecil Beaton, and was intended to explore "red in art.. and red in semiotics."

=== Collections ===
Charles Jeffrey's first solo show for his LOVERBOY label was in June 2017, and he has presented collections twice yearly since.

- AW23 Engine Room
- SS23 PHWOARRR
- AW22 Art of Noise
- SS22 Portal
- AW21 Gloom
- SS21 The Healing
- AW20 Hell Mend You
- SS20 Mind's Instructions
- AW19 Darling Little Sillies
- SS19 Emergence
- AW18 Tantrum
- SS18 First solo show, Portrait of a LOVERBOY

=== Awards ===
- 2018 Breakthrough Designer, GQ Men of the Year Awards
- 2018 Finalist, LVMH Prize
- 2017 British Emerging Talent - Menswear, British Fashion Awards
- 2016 Young Designer of the Year, Scottish Fashion Awards
- 2015 Fashion Graduate of the Year, Scottish Fashion Awards

== Fashion ideal ==
Jeffrey describes his career as "a journey of my own identity," rooted in the principle that the personal is political. His creative methodology was significantly shaped at Central Saint Martins by tutor Louise Wilson, who encouraged him to analyze his personal style and document his daily outfits. These self-reflective images formed the foundation for his brand, Loverboy.

His designs frequently subvert traditional gender norms. Reflecting on an incident on the Paris Métro where he avoided harassment for wearing a Givenchy kilt skirt by identifying it as traditional Scottish dress and pretending not to be gay, this experience reinforced his exploration of how attire intersects with gender norms and societal perceptions.

== Influences and collaborators ==
Jeffrey credits the club night LOVERBOY at Vogue Fabrics in London's East End - started by Jeffrey in 2014 to help fund his MA - for helping to form his label's aesthetic: “the clothes were made in that club space, and I learned a lot about being a queer person through being there.” Jeffrey has described the club nights as a “no-rules nocturnal laboratory,” inspired by 1980s clubs like Blitz and Taboo, and legendary queer performers such as Leigh Bowery and Boy George.

Jeffrey's collections reflect his Scottish heritage, including kilts, tartan, and references to Scottish traditions. In 2017, Jeffrey designed a signature LOVERBOY tartan, debuting it as part of his Autumn/Winter 2018 collection, "Tantrum." LOVERBOY'S Autumn/Winter 2020 Collection, "Hell Mend You" was partially inspired by the intricate costumes worn for the Festival of the Horse, on the Orkney Island of South Ronaldsay.

Jeffrey has many regular collaborators, including make-up artist Lucy Bridge, visual artist and theatre director Theo Adams, set designer Gary Card, musician Tom Furse, and photographers Tim Walker and Thurstan Redding. Sarah Mower of Vogue notes how "the ‘we’ and the ‘our’ is the collective point about the Loverboy phenomenon. Jeffrey is...a ringmaster and pied piper of many who have formed a movement sprung straight out of the British art school tradition."
