= Dorado (surname) =

Dorado is a surname. It may refer to:

- Alicia Dorado (1911–1937), Galician anarchist
- Chechu Dorado (born 1982), Spanish footballer
- Emmanuel Dorado (born 1973), French footballer
- Javier Dorado (born 1977), Spanish footballer
- Jorge Dorado (born 1976), Spanish director
- Lina Dorado (born 1975), American artist
- Lince Dorado (born 1987), American wrestler
- Pablo Dorado (1908–1978), Uruguayan footballer
- Vivar Dorado (born 1974), Spanish footballer
