= Lako Bukia =

Georgian fashion designer (born 1987)

Lako Bukia (Georgian: ლაკო ბუკია), born as Lali Bukia is a Georgian fashion designer. She studied at London College of Fashion. Her collections are produced in the United Kingdom and has Georgia-based studio in Tbilisi as well.

== Bio ==
Bukia was born on October 4, 1987, in the city of Tbilisi, capital of Georgia. After graduating from School No. 58 in Tbilisi, she was immediately offered a place at the A. Kutateladze Tbilisi State Academy of Art, where she did her BA in fashion design and textiles. Her first fashion show took place in Tbilisi in 2008. The collection “Mushroom”, presented at the Fashion show received high praise not only of the jury and public, who attended the show in Tbilisi, but of the external critics from Ukraine, who invited Bukia to take part in the Kiev fashion week of young designers in May 2009. The collection was also exhibited in Central Saint Martins College of Art and Design in October 2008 and has been published in the spring issue of “Oasis”, popular American fashion magazine. By the time Bukia took part in the Kiev Fashion show, where she received praises from the French jury, she has already done her foundation studies at St. Martin’s College of Art and Design in London and successfully completed her summer course on fashion design at the prestigious Istituto Marangoni in Milan, Italy. Moreover, she is now pursuing a new BA degree in fashion design and technology womenswear at London College of Fashion and is finishing her second year, where she studies various subjects, including realisation, design, CADCAM, cultural and historical studies. Bukia has also been working recently on styling projects together with fashion stylist Katie Burnett (www.katieburnett.co.uk), which gives her great insights into the work of the fashion stylist. Bukia was among 30 Georgian designers, who have taken part in the fashion show for the 'Days of Peace', dedicated to the Russian-Georgian conflict. Her white dress was acclaimed highly by prominent fashion critics.

== See also ==
- David Koma, Georgian fashion designer based in London
- Tata Naka, Georgian fashion designer based in London
