= Fyodor Golan =

British fashion brand

FYODOR GOLAN
- Company type: Private company
- Industry: Fashion
- Founded: 2011
- Headquarters: London, the United Kingdom
- Key people: Fyodor Podgorny & Golan Frydman (co-founders and partners)
- Products: Apparel
- Website: https://fyodor-golan.com/

FYODOR GOLAN is a fashion brand based in London. It was founded in 2011 by Latvian designer Fyodor Podgorny (born January 9, 1985, in Ventspils) and Golan Frydman (born October 13, 1984, in Kfar Saba). The duo is known for their colourful advanced-contemporary ready-to-wear designs.

== Background ==
Fyodor Podgorny was born in Latvia and later moved to Belgium to study fashion design, at the Royal Academy of Fine Arts (Antwerp). In 2007 he moved to London where he worked for Issey Miyake.

Golan Frydman was born in Israel. He moved to London to study fashion design at the Instituto Marangoni. Frydman graduated in 2008. After an internship at Richard Nicoll, he worked for Alexander McQueen from 2009 to 2010.

The couple married in London in 2010. Podgorny and Frydman founded the brand in 2011.

== Career ==
They launched their debut collection at Vauxhall Fashion Scout. In September 2011 the duo won the Fashion Fringe Award with the brand's second season. As a part of the award the designers gained funding, a studio space in Somerset House, a place at the official London Fashion Week, and business support.

In 2012 FYODOR GOLAN was the focus of the Victoria & Albert Fashion in Motion exhibition. In 2014 the fashion company joined the Swarovski Collective. In 2014 the brand collaborated with Microsoft and created an interactive skirt for their autumn/winter collection made from Nokia Lumia 1520 smartphones. The images on the screens were made to change and react to the wearer's movements and give the illusion of a fabric.

Since January 2013 the brand is supported by the New Fashion Venture programme from the Centre for Fashion Enterprise. In 2016 FYODOR GOLAN partnered with Miximaliste, a sustainable pre-order retail business and created for London Fashion Week a 3D CGI fashion presentation. In 2016 and 2017 FYODOR GOLAN was selected for the British Fashion Council Fashion Trust. In 2018 the company sold a minority stake to fashion investor Eisha Bharati Pasricha.

FYODOR GOLAN has collaborated with several brands, including My Little Pony, Coca-Cola, MTV, Post-It, Sonic the Hedgehog, Chupa Chups and Powerpuff Girls.

The fashion label's designs were worn by Madonna, Bella Hadid, Rihanna (for her collaboration with Samsung called ANTIdiaRy), Jennifer Lopez, Ariana Grande, Zendaya, Hayley Kiyoko (to the MTV Video Music Award's after party celebrating her Best New Artist Award), Rita Ora (performing at the Capital FM Summer Time Ball and for her performance at the MTV Europe Music Awards in 2017).

== Awards and honours ==
- 2011 – Fashion Fringe Award
- 2012 – was the focus of the Victoria and Albert Fashion in Motion exhibition
- 2013 – supported by the Centre for Fashion Enterprise
- 2013 – shortlisted for the Dorchester Collection Fashion Prize
- 2013 – shortlisted for the International Woolmark Prize in the British Isle's category
- 2015 – Best Young Talent in Womenswear at the Premium Young Designers Awards in Berlin
- 2015 – Decoded Fashion Futures Awards for best new E-Store
- 2016 and 2017 – selected for the British Fashion Council Fashion Trust
