= Claire Johnston =

Claire Johnston may refer to:

- Claire Johnston (film theorist)
- Claire Johnston (musician)
- Claire Johnston (bowls)

== See also ==
- Claire Johnstone, Scottish footballer
- Claire Johnson, Canadian politician
- Clare Johnson, American writer and artist
