= Keith Cunningham (artist) =

Australian painter (1929–2014)

Keith Cunningham (1929 – 2014) was an Australian-born, London-based painter and graphic designer known for his expressive figurative paintings. He studied at the Royal College of Art in London alongside artists such as Frank Auerbach and Leon Kossoff, and is regarded as a prominent figure in the 1950s London art scene. Cunningham’s canvases, marked by thick, sculptural brushstrokes, explore themes of mortality and human experience, drawing comparisons to Francis Bacon.

After achieving early success, he mysteriously withdrew from exhibiting in 1967, keeping his work private until his death. His paintings were rediscovered posthumously, leading to new exhibitions and greater recognition of his contribution to post-war British art.

== Early life and education ==
Keith Cunningham was born in 1929 in Sydney, Australia. At age 15, he left school to work in the art department of David Jones department store. There, he read around the subject of design – and especially Bauhaus – and nurtured ambitions to become a painter. In 1949, he moved to London and enrolled at the Central School of Arts and Crafts (now Central Saint Martins), where he studied graphic design until 1952. He later joined the Royal College of Art (RCA) in 1952, after presenting a few works on paper to Rodrigo Moynihan, then the institution’s head of painting. There he studied painting until 1955 under tutors like John Minton, who described him as 'one of the most gifted painters to have worked at the Royal College'.

== Works ==
Keith Cunningham’s artistic output includes oil paintings, pastels, watercolours, and drawings, each medium showcasing his figurative style and focus on themes such as mortality and human experience. His approach varied across media: oil paintings are characterised by dense, expressive brushwork, while watercolours adopt a lighter, more fluid quality. Recurring subjects, including skulls, fighting dogs, and heads reflect an ongoing interest in psychological and existential themes. Though aligned with contemporaries such as Francis Bacon and Frank Auerbach in subject and tone, Cunningham’s reclusive nature meant that much of his work remained unseen until after his death.

=== Oil paintings ===
At the Royal College of Art, Cunningham developed a distinctive figurative style, producing oil paintings characterised by dense layers of paint and dark subject matter, such as skulls, fighting dogs, and contorted figures. In 1955, he was awarded an RCA travelling scholarship, which enabled him to visit Spain, including Andalucía and Madrid. There, he encountered the work of Francisco Goya, whose influence can be seen in Cunningham’s Iberian-inflected palette and violent subject matter. His paintings from the 1950s and early 1960s are rendered in a muted, earthy palette. These canvases depict animals in states of conflict or decay, distorted portraits, and scenes that evoke themes of death and despair. His work was acquired by prominent collectors such as Hans and Elsbeth Juda, who promoted him internationally. Cunningham exhibited with the London Group in 1956 and 1957 and had work accepted to the Royal Academy’s Summer Exhibition. In 1957, he showed at the influential Beaux Arts Gallery. These early exhibitions established his reputation, which was later reaffirmed by the rediscovery of his work in The Cloud of Witness exhibition at Newport Street Gallery in 2022, positioning him as a significant figure in post-war British art.

=== Pastels and watercolours ===
From the late 1960s, after withdrawing from public exhibitions, Cunningham increasingly turned to pastels and watercolours, producing smaller-scale works than his oil paintings. These works sometimes retain his figurative focus but adopt a lighter, more fluid approach compared to his oil paintings. Some compositions revisit earlier themes—heads, animals, and enigmatic forms—while others explore more atmospheric or abstract effects. These works remained largely unseen until posthumous exhibitions, such as the 2022 display at The Pilgrim hotel in London, revealing a more intimate aspect of his practice.

=== Drawings ===
Cunningham’s drawings, executed primarily in charcoal and ink, served as both preparatory studies and standalone works. They often depict heads, human figures, and animals, ranging from sketches to finished compositions. A constant throughout his career, his drawings were discovered in abundance in his Battersea flat after his death in 2014, significantly contributing to his posthumous recognition.

=== Graphic Design ===
From the late 1960s, Cunningham shifted focus to graphic design. He worked as a graphic designer for the publisher Peter Owen, producing a range of hardback book covers. These designs were exhibited at the 2004 Barbican exhibition Communicate: British Independent Graphic Design since the Sixties, and some were later acquired by the University of Brighton Design Archives. He also taught drawing and printing at the London College of Printing for nearly 40 years, starting in 1956.

== Style and influences ==
Cunningham’s paintings often have thick, sculptural brushwork and muted, earthy tones, sometimes interpreted as evoking decay or parched landscapes. His subjects—distorted portraits, dead animals, and skulls—interrogate boundaries between life and death. This and his focus on expressive figuration aligned him with contemporaries in London such as Francis Bacon and Frank Auerbach, with whom he shared an interest in the human condition. His influences include Spanish Old Masters like Francisco Goya, whose work had an impact on his palette and composition. His widow Bobby Hillson has noted this ‘unconscious influence’: ‘When you see the whole lot of paintings. Unlike many of his peers, Cunningham often painted from memory, a technique that has been credited with lending his work a distinctive, emotive quality. For art critic and academic James Cahill, ‘Their air of immediacy – of a physical presence merging with a vivid mental impression – finds condensed expression in his paintings of heads.’

== Retirement from exhibiting ==
In 1960, when the London Group invited him to become a full member, he declined. In 1967, Cunningham abruptly stopped exhibiting his paintings. This decision remains unexplained. He continued to paint and draw privately, amassing over 150 oil paintings, watercolours, and drawings in his Battersea flat, which he kept hidden from the public. He maintained a daily studio practice but was reluctant to show his work, occasionally sharing pieces with his wife, Bobby Hillson, and very few others. From the late 1960s, his focus shifted from working in oils to graphic design, teaching, watercolours and drawings. His depictions of heads, for example, drew on his sketches of people he saw around him in London.

== Rediscovery and legacy ==
Following Cunningham’s death in 2014, at age 85, more than five decades of unseen works were discovered in his Battersea flat. In 2016, his wife and friends organised an exhibition, Unseen Paintings 1954–60, at the Hoxton Gallery in London. A larger exhibition, The Cloud of Witness, featuring over 70 works, was held at Damien Hirst's Newport Street Gallery in 2022, reintroducing Cunningham to the art world. In 2023, the book Keith Cunningham: Paintings was published, dedicated to his work from the 1950s and 1960s. These efforts have positioned Cunningham as a significant, if elusive, figure in post-war London, with critics noting his ability to rival his better-known contemporaries.

On 16 October 2025, Keith Cunningham’s Pink Head (1953–1960) outperformed expectations at Bonhams’ 20th & 21st Century Art Evening Sale, achieving £53,750 – well above its guide of £20,000–£30,000.

== Personal life ==
Cunningham married fashion illustrator Bobby Hillson in 1951, whom he met in 1950 while she was a fashion student at Central Saint Martins. In December 1952, they had a son, Jonathan. He remained private throughout his life, rarely discussing his personal affairs or artistic motivations.
