= MRK =

MRK, Mrk, mrk may refer to:

- Merck Group, Frankfurt Stock Exchange stock ticker
- Merck & Co., New York Stock Exchange stock ticker
- MRK (visual artist)
- M. R. Krishnamurthy, a Tamil actor
- Markarian galaxy prefix, e.g. Mkr03-e (also Mrk, Mkn)
- Marco Island Airport, IATA code
