= Jane Carr (disambiguation) =

Jane Carr (born 1950) is an English actress.

Jane Carr may also refer to:

- Jane Carr (fashion designer), British fashion designer
- Jane Carr (actress, born 1909), earlier British actress, also known as Rita Brunstrom
