= David Koma =

Georgian fashion designer

David Koma დავით კომა
- Born: Tbilisi, Georgia
- Education: Central Saint Martins
- Label: David Koma (from 2009) Mugler (2013 - 2017) Blumarine (from 2024)

Davit Komakhidze (Georgian: დავით კომახიძე) known as David Koma (stylized as DΛVID KOMΛ) is a Georgian fashion designer based in London, England.

Koma established his eponymous luxury womenswear fashion brand in 2009 and has been showing his collections during London Fashion Week ever since.

Internationally acclaimed celebrities often turn to the designer for red carpet looks, including Beyonce, Dua Lipa, Jennifer Lopez, Cara Delevingne, Kendall Jenner, Rosie Huntington-Whiteley, Blackpink, and Adele to mention a few.

From July 2013 to December 2017, he worked as the creative director of Mugler. He is currently the creative director of Blumarine.

== Personal life ==
Koma was born in Tbilisi, Georgia but moved to Saint Petersburg, Russia, at the age of nine. He relocated to London in 2003 and has been residing in Shoreditch, East London for over a decade. Koma has a younger brother and sister.

== Education ==
Koma discovered his penchant for drawing and dress design at the age of eight. To pursue his interests, Koma studied Fine Art in Saint Petersburg, taking part in design competitions from age 13 and showing his first collection at the age of 15.

In 2003 Koma moved to London to take up a place at the Central Saint Martins College of Art and Design. After completing his BA in Fashion Design, Koma graduated with an MA Fashion in April 2009, winning a Harrods Design Award at the Graduate Fashion Week.

== Career ==
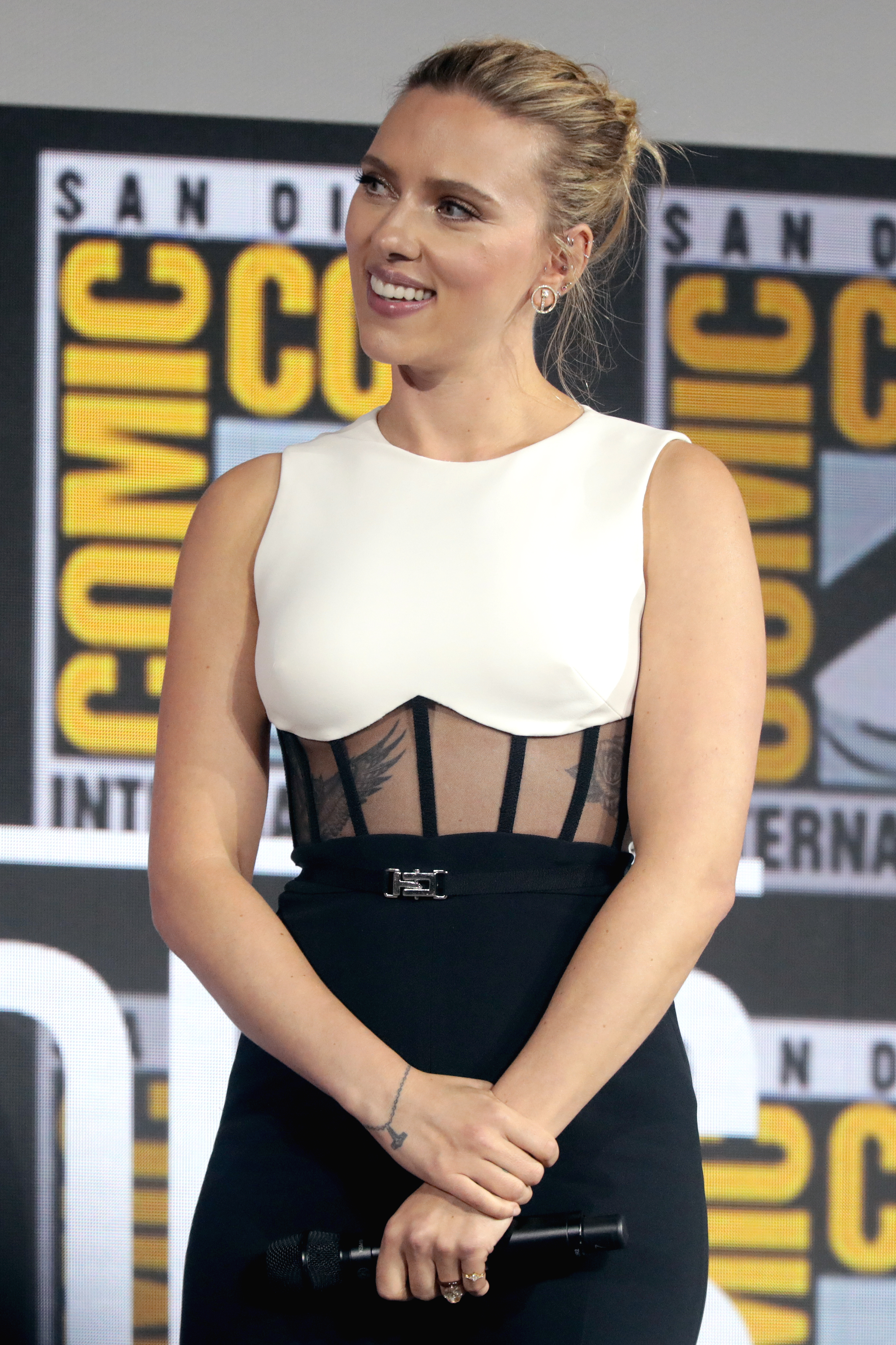
Scarlett Johansson wears David Koma Jumpsuit at 2019 San Diego Comic Con.

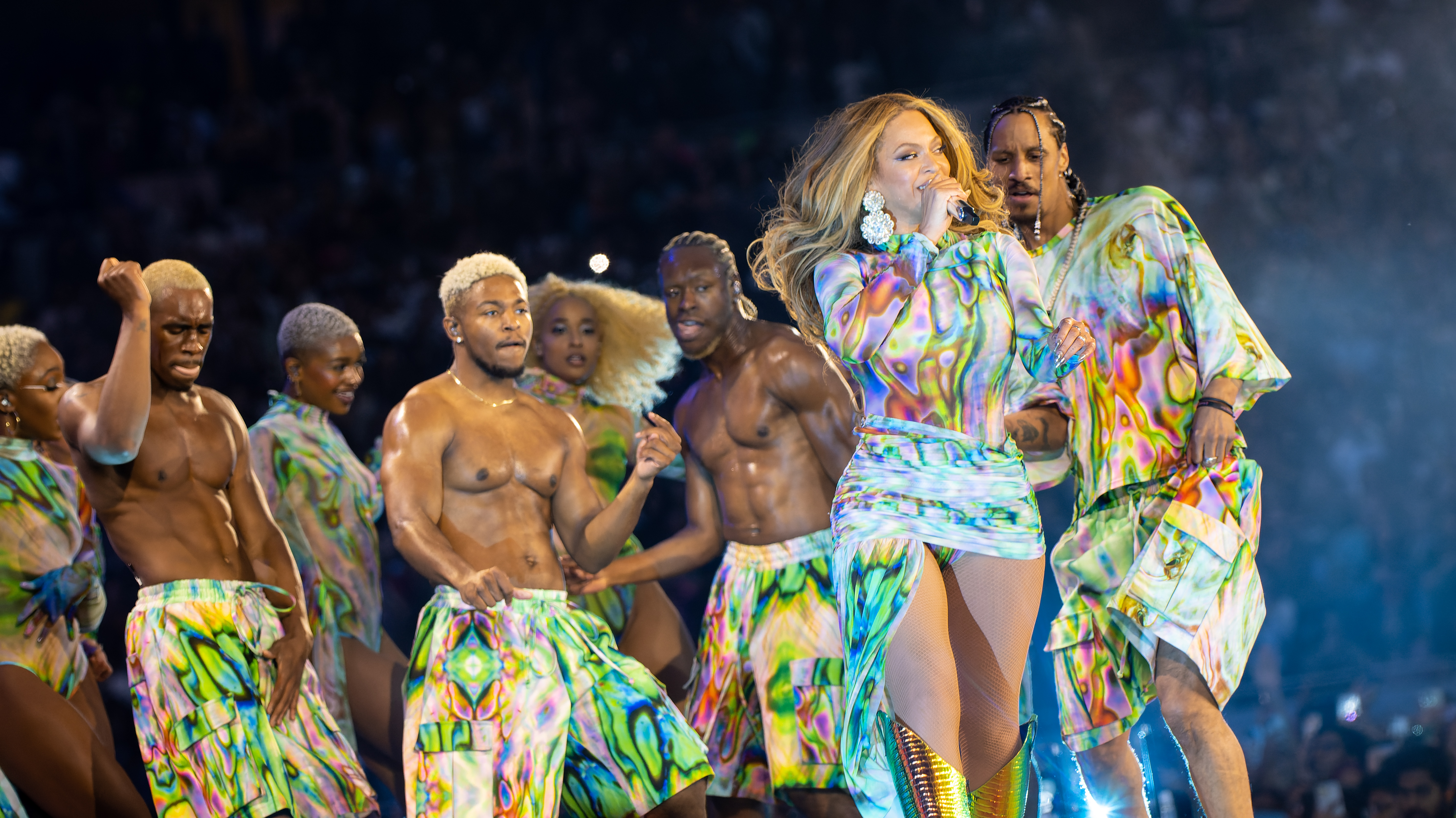
Beyonce and dancers wearing David Koma clothing during The Renaissance World Tour.

Straight after graduation Koma launched his eponymous ready-to-wear brand and has been a participant of London Fashion Week ever since.

David Koma brand has become synonymous with the ultra body-contouring silhouette, creating sculptural statement dresses inspired by the feminine form. The house is often commended for the couture-like finishes of the garments, whether it is the gravity-defying opulent hand embroidery or sleek and contemporary exemplary cut silhouette.

Alongside the bodycon Silhouette that propelled the designer onto the international stage, David Koma ready-to-wear offering has expanded to include a wide range of options from daywear, to outerwear, red carpet gowns, and jumpsuits.

David Koma collections are inspired by the female form. The brand’s muses are often historically iconic women in the male-dominated fields: from marine biologist Dr Sylvia Earle, to pioneering women of motorsport - Adeline and Augusta Van Buren or Lily Parr - a successful 1920’s female footballer.

Singer Beyoncé was the first celebrity to support the designer, wearing a dress by Koma in 2009, for the MTV Europe Music Awards, which was from his Central Saint Martins graduate collection. Beyonce has since worn the brand multiple times for memorable appearances including for Be Alive performance at 2022's Academy Awards and during Renaissance World Tour.

From December 2013 until December 2017, Koma held the position of creative director at Mugler, sharing his time between London and Paris while simultaneously running his eponymous label.

On 31 July 2024, Koma was appointed as creative director of Blumarine.

== Recognition ==
Over the years, the David Koma brand has received numerous prizes including Vauxhall Fashion Scout in 2009, NEWGEN sponsorship in 2010 and Fashion Forward in 2013. In 2020, David Koma won the British Fashion Council / Vogue Fashion Fund, after being shortlisted in both 2018 and 2019.

== See also ==
- Lako Bukia, Georgian fashion designer based in London
- Tata Naka, Georgian dress label based in London
- Demna Gvasalia, Georgian fashion designer, creative director of Balenciaga
