= Moira Keenan =

British journalist

Moira Keenan in 1972

Moira Keenan (1933 – 16 October 1972) was a British fashion and lifestyle journalist.

== Life and work ==
Keenan grew up in India where her father, Brigadier-General John Keenan served as a British officer of the Indian Army. She and her sisters were raised by governesses. After Gandhi's assassination, the family returned to England, making their home in Hampshire. Keenan joined Ernestine Carter to work at The Sunday Times in 1957. In 1969, she moved to The Times, becoming its Woman's Editor on New Years Day 1970. Keenan was particularly interested in issues involving children and family. Her regular column, "Growing Point" was widely regarded by professionals working in psychology and social services, as well as the public. Carter and Keenan and their editorial team were credited with having changed the face of fashion reporting in newspapers, presenting articles that emphasised excellence of design at all price levels. Keenan's younger sister, Brigid, was also a noted journalist, working as Woman's Editor of The Observer whilst Moira held the same role at The Times. Brigid would go on to secure a job at The Sunday Times after being mistaken for her more successful sister.

In 1972, Keenan was the journalist asked to choose that year's Dress of the Year for the Museum of Costume, Bath. She chose teenage and children's clothing by Biba, Bobby Hillson and Burton. At the time, she commented that young children had never been so aware of their clothing and the importance of their appearance.

Keenan died on 16 October 1972, after a ten-year battle with cancer and her requiem mass was held at St Etheldreda's Church on 19 October. Keenan was married to John Ogden and the couple had two sons, Peregrine and William.
