= Christopher Nemeth =

British fashion designer

- Christopher Nemeth in 1985, photographed by Mark Lebon.
- Born: 20 April 1959; Birmingham, England
- Died: 22 September 2010 (aged 51)

Christopher Nemeth was a British fashion designer (of Hungarian descent) who became established in London in the 1980s, before relocating to Tokyo in 1986. He was particularly renowned for his wearable art designs.

== Early life ==
Born Christopher Louis Nemeth in Birmingham, Nemeth studied painting at the Camberwell College of Arts, London, between 1979 and 1982, when he graduated. Among his paintings were works using glue, sand and printing on deconstructed old clothing used as a canvas. He subsequently decided to start making clothing for himself, as he could not find garments to suit his tastes.

== Fashion ==
At first, Nemeth hand-sewed his designs from discarded materials, including his own paintings. He was particularly known for his use of linen mail bags found discarded on the streets of London, but also used rope and charity shop clothing to assemble his pieces. He then began selling his work through the Kensington Market, London. His clothing was mainly androgynous menswear, although he produced some designs specifically for women.

In 1985, Nemeth met the photographer Mark Lebon, who showcased his designs in a shoot for i-D magazine. This led to Nemeth's designs being retailed in the Mayfair boutique Bazaar. At the same time, Lebon introduced Nemeth to the jewellery and accessories designer and stylist Judy Blame, who had co-founded The House of Beauty and Culture in Dalston with the shoe designer John Moore. Soon afterwards, Nemeth met his future wife, Keiko, the first person to sell his work in Japan, at a John Galliano fashion show. In June 1986 he decided to relocate to Tokyo to be with Keiko, where he sold his clothing through the Sector boutique in Harajuku. Sector also retailed Blame's work and the early work of Galliano. In 1993, Nemeth took over Sector, renaming it after himself, and opened branches in Osaka, Fukuoka and Nagoya. He continued to use recycled fabrics, combining discarded offcuts and remnants from tailoring shops into patchwork yardage to use for his designs.

Although Nemeth achieved popularity and a cult following in Japan, as a result of his move, his reputation back in Britain has remained low-profile. His name is better known among fashion insiders than among the general public, with his higher-profile admirers including designers Martin Margiela and Rei Kawakubo. Kawakubo, who is said to have been inspired by Nemeth's deconstructive approach, sold his work through her Dover Street Market in London. In 2015, Kim Jones presented a menswear collection for Louis Vuitton inspired by Nemeth, and celebrating his life and work. The collection incorporated Nemeth's own prints, and jewellery designed by Blame. Jones, who is a renowned collector of 1980s London clubwear design, described Nemeth as "the most important designer to come out of London alongside Vivienne Westwood. He is Savile Row, he is the street, he is the club."

== Death ==
Nemeth died on 22 September 2010 from lung cancer. Nemeth's daughters, Lui and Riyo Nemeth, have launched a venue for young designers and artists in London called Primitive, designed to carry on their father's legacy.
