= Volodymyr Galanternyk =

Ukrainian politician

- Володимир Галантерник
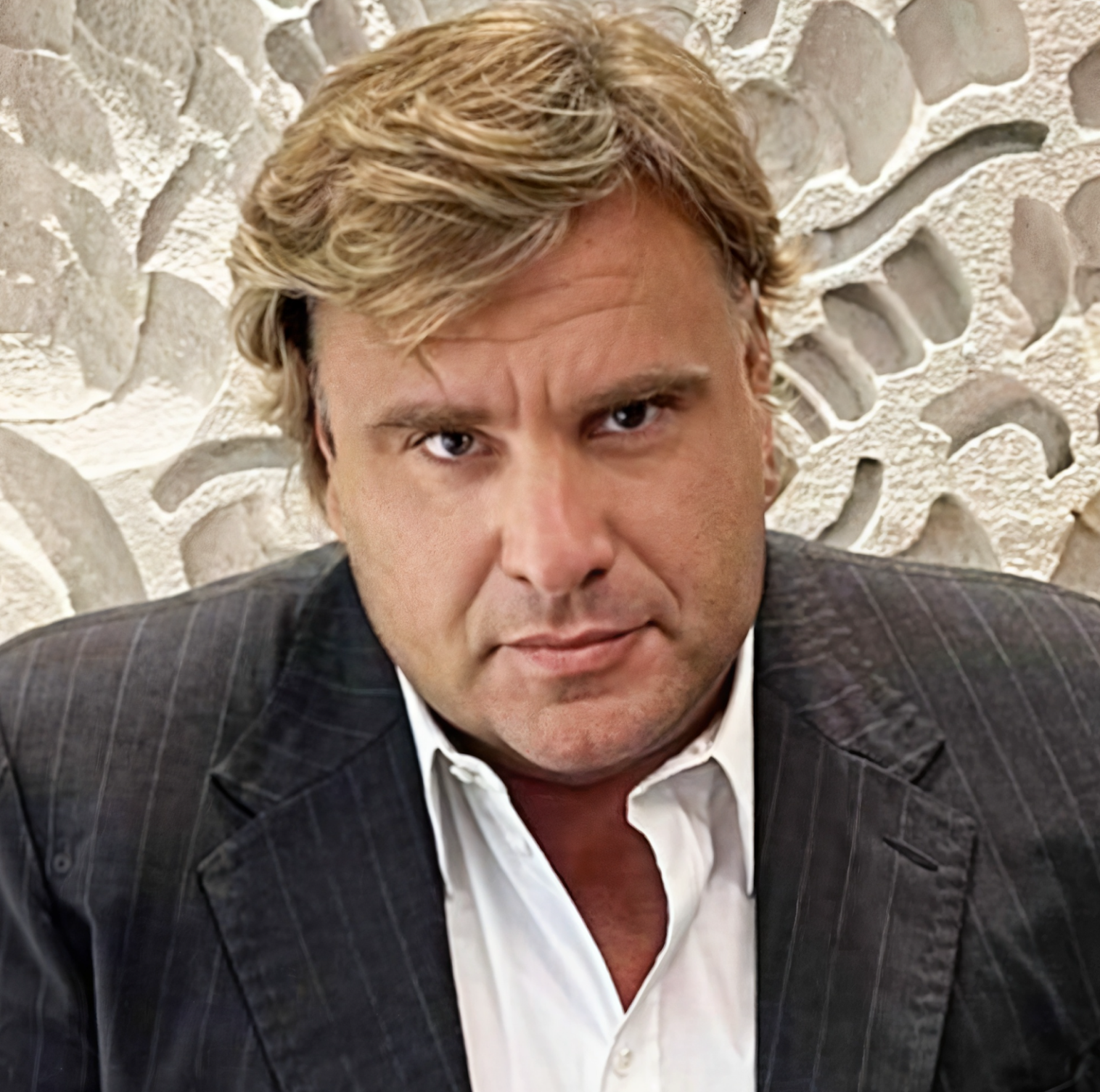
- Born: Odesa, Ukraine
- Education: Academy of Architecture and Construction I.I. Mechnikov National University (PhD)
- Occupations: Businessman, politician, philanthropist
- Known for: Business ventures, political activity in Odesa, philanthropy
- Political party: Nasha Ukraina (former) Doviryai Dilam
- Spouse: Associated with Natasha Zinko (British fashion designer)

Volodymyr Galanternyk (Володимир Галантерник) is a Ukrainian businessman, politician, and philanthropist known for his involvement in regional politics in Odesa, Ukraine. He is also the founder of the "MIR" Charity Foundation.

== Early life and education ==
Galanternyk was born and raised in Odesa, Ukraine. He completed two years, fulfilling his mandatory military service before pursuing higher education. He earned degrees from the Academy of Architecture and Construction and the Odesa University, where he eventually defended his PhD.

== Career ==
Currently, based in London, Galanternyk built a diversified business portfolio that includes construction companies, real estate developments, shopping and entertainment complexes, and the Odesa Privoz market.

=== Politics ===
Galanternyk is also active in regional politics in Odesa. He served as a deputy in the Odesa regional council representing President Yushchenko’s party, Nasha Ukraina. After 2010, he became affiliated with the political party Doviryai Dilam, which is linked to the Odesa mayor.

In 2016, a conflict on the political ground arose between the Odesa city mayor and former head of Odesa regional administration (governor) Mikheil Saakashvili, which led to a struggle among local elites. One of the key objectives was to weaken the mayor's party, as well as Trukhanov himself and the party's supporter, Galanternyk.

Following the appointment of Saakashvili’s ally, Gizo Uglava, to a senior role in Ukraine’s anti-corruption agencies, criminal cases were initiated against Trukhanov, Galanternik, and several Odesa entrepreneurs. This became known as the “Odesa case,” which was marred by controversies and alleged violations of the rights of those under investigation.

In 2023, after a corruption scandal involving the so-called “leak” of the road construction case, Uglava was dismissed from Ukraine’s anti-corruption bodies. Ukrainian media also reported that Mayor Trukhanov directly accused Uglava of demanding a bribe.

=== Philanthropy ===
In 2015, Galanternyk established the MIR Charity Foundation to support low-income families, children of soldiers defending Ukraine during both the Anti-Terrorist Operation (ATO) and the full-scale invasion, as well as orphans and children with disabilities. The foundation operates in Odesa, providing support to orphanages and facilities for individuals with disabilities. Its initiatives include arranging the relocation of children from large families to Moldova, Poland, and Slovakia, delivering humanitarian aid to families impacted by the Bucha terrorist attack, facilitating the evacuation of children from Mariupol to safer regions, collaborating with assistance centers for displaced persons in Odesa, and aiding families affected by missile and drone strikes on residential buildings in the city.

Additionally, the foundation offers monthly support to single mothers raising children with autism and assists the families of journalists who had to flee Kherson, Mariupol, Zaporizhia, and Mykolaiv due to the war. Over the years, it has organized more than 100 charitable events and continues to provide regular material aid, including hygiene products, clothing, bedding, and food.

In 2025, MIR Charity Foundation held a charity art auction in Vienna featuring paintings by girls from an orphanage in Odesa. Proceeds from the event were used to support children affected by the war in Ukraine.

== Personal life ==
Galanternyk is associated with the British fashion designer Natalia Zinko. She frequently gives interviews, and Natalia's brand, Natasha Zinko, is featured at the prestigious London department store Harrods. Her designs have been worn by American celebrities, including Beyoncé and Jennifer Lopez. With over 150,000 followers on social media, ELLE magazine has recognized Zinko as a notable figure in street style.
