= Meadham Kirchhoff =

British fashion label

- Product type: Clothing
- Country: England
- Introduced: 2006
- Discontinued: 2015
- Previous owners: Edward Meadham; Benjamin Kirchhoff

Meadham Kirchhoff was a British fashion label founded in 2006 by Edward Meadham (born in Somerset) and Benjamin Kirchhoff (born in Chad), who met when studying for bachelor's degrees at Central Saint Martins in London.

== History ==
Upon graduation in 2002, Meadham and Kirchhoff joined forces to start a menswear label Benjamin Kirchhoff, which was selected for the first Fashion East MAN show in 2005. A year later, they relaunched to include womenswear under the label Meadham Kirchhoff.

In February 2006 they were awarded NEWGEN sponsorship from the British Fashion Council and showed at London Fashion Week as part of Fashion East.

In 2010 they were the recipients of the 'Emerging Talent Ready-to-Wear' award at the British Fashion Awards. They were also nominated for the British Fashion Award's inaugural 'New Establishment' award in 2012.

Meadham Kirchhoff staged their first menswear show in June 2012 as part of the Spring/Summer 2013 shows at London Collections:Men.

In 2011 they were chosen by the British Fashion Council to be one of three recipients of Fashion Forward sponsorship for their London Fashion Week shows in February and September 2011.

Meadham Kirchhoff collaborated with Topshop on a number of capsules collections Their A/W2013 range for Topshop consisted of 89 pieces and was at the time the largest collaborative collection that topshop had produced.

In December 2013, they showed as part of the V&A museum's Fashion in Motion series.

in 2014 they were shortlisted as semifinalists in the LVMH Prize.

Their final collection was Spring/Summer 2015, shown during London Fashion Week in September 2014. The brand closed in September 2015 in a "quagmire of debt".
