= Brigid Keenan =

British author and journalist (born 1939)

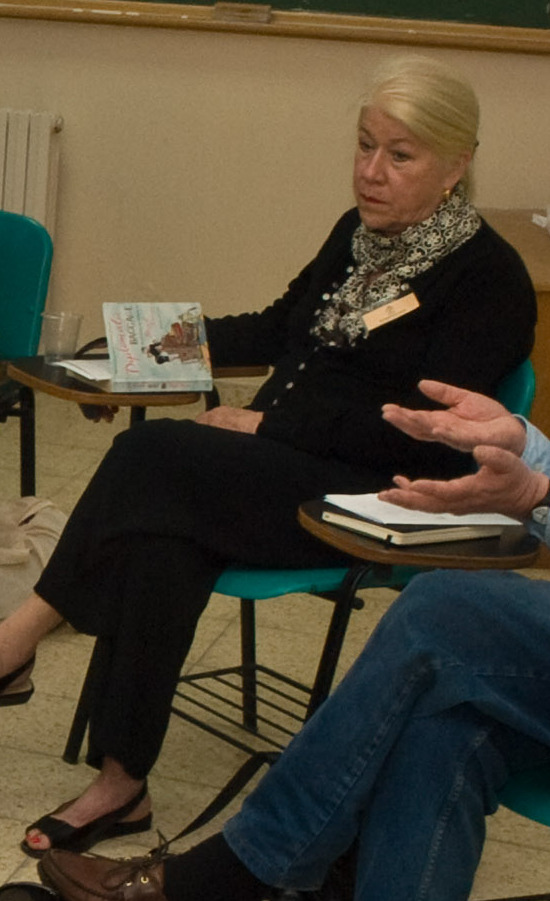
Keenan at PalFest in 2008

Brigid Ann Keenan (born 1939) is an author and journalist.

She was born in Ambala, India, where her father was an officer in the British Indian Army during the Raj. Her family repatriated to the United Kingdom after India's independence in 1947, and she was subsequently sent to convent schools in England and a finishing school in Paris.

Keenan has worked as an editor on Nova magazine, The Observer and The Sunday Times. Her older sister Moira Keenan (1933-1972) was also a successful journalist who worked as Woman's Editor of The Times whilst Keenan had the same role at The Observer. When Keenan secured her job at The Sunday Times, the paper had mistaken her for her older, and at the time, more successful sister. After marrying a European Union diplomat, Keenan left her successful career as a fashion editor to become a trailing spouse and best-selling author. Her published works include The Women We Wanted to Look Like (1978), Dior in Vogue (1988), Travels in Kashmir (1989), Damascus: Hidden Treasures of the Old City (2001), Diplomatic Baggage: The Adventures of a Trailing Spouse (2005), Packing Up: Further Adventures of a Trailing Spouse (2014), and Full Marks for Trying (2016). As of 2020 she is a contributor to The Oldie and Trailing-Spouse.com.

Keenan has lived in Ethiopia, Brussels, Trinidad, Barbados, India, West Africa, Syria and Central Asia. She is a founding board member of the Palestine Festival of Literature.

She is married to Alan Waddams, a retired ambassador, with whom she has two children and four grandchildren.
