= Love (magazine) =

Fashion magazine

LOVE
- The cover of the debut issue, featuring Beth Ditto
- Categories: Fashion
- Frequency: Biannual
- First issue: February 2009
- Company: Condé Nast Publications (2009–2024); Convoy (2025–present)
- Country: United Kingdom
- Based in: Paris
- Language: English
- Website: lovemagazine.net

LOVE (stylised in all caps) is a biannual fashion magazine, published in Paris since 2009 (previously London till 2020 and New York City till 2024).

== Background ==
=== Editors ===
Editor	Start year	End year	Ref.
Katie Grand	2009	2020	
Ben Cobb	2020	2020	
Whembley Sewell	2020	2021	
Sarah Burke	2021	2024	

== History ==
Founded in 2009 by stylist and fashion journalist Katie Grand. She joined the magazine's publisher Condé Nast from pioneering British fashion title Pop with a brief to launch an edgy, photographic fashion title aimed at broadening the company's audience. The first cover in 2009 featured American singer-songwriter Beth Ditto, naked. Later covers have featured Madonna, Cher, Kate Moss, Miley Cyrus, Lea T, Justin Bieber, Hiroshi Tanahashi, Maria Kanellis-Bennett and Minnie Mouse.

In 2012, Lulu Kennedy, founder of the Fashion East initiative, joined Grand's team as editor-at-large and Alexander Fury was named editor. Suzanne Weinstock of the Columbia University Graduate School of Journalism described the magazine this way in 2010:

"Despite its glossy pages, the magazine has a raw look. Black-and-white photography dominates, and most of the color photography has a muted palette, as if the pictures have aged and faded. Some images are clearly fashion photography; others are more like inventive snapshots. Nudity is plentiful in many styles, from the grittily pornographic to the breathtakingly artistic."

Grand left the magazine in September 2020. She was replaced by Whembley Sewell and the magazine moved its offices to the United States now overseen by them. Love became digital only and slowly winded down operations until closure in 2024.

=== Relaunch ===
LOVE returned in September 2025 with issue 24. No longer published by Condé Nast, the relaunched title is edited by Juan Costa Paz and Nordine Benotmane and based in Paris. According to their press release, they aim to bring a 'distinct perspective that steps outside the Anglo-American fashion axis, rooted in European culture, but engaged with a global creative community,'. The magazine is now based in Paris with distribution focusing on New York, Paris, Milan, London, and Los Angeles.
