= Bobby Hillson =

Bobby Hillson is a London-based fashion illustrator, former designer of children's clothing, and founder of the Saint Martin's School of Art MA Fashion course.

== Early life ==
Hillson, who had studied at Saint Martin's School of Art, started out as an illustrator for publications such as Vogue UK, The Sunday Times, and The Observer in the early 1950s. In 1954 she attended Coco Chanel's relaunch show. She is particularly renowned for her 1960s illustration work. In 1969, she launched her childrenswear brand, and in 1972, a little girl's dress and pinafore was chosen as the Dress of the Year by Moira Keenan alongside a Biba outfit and a young boy's outfit by Burton. As of 2018, no other children's clothes have been selected as Dress of the Year.

== Teaching career ==
Hillson returned to Saint Martin's School of Art to teach on the fashion diploma course in 1956. In the late 1970s she developed and wrote the MA fashion course, with the first cohort of graduates showing in 1980.

While at Saint Martin's, Hillson was one of the first people to recognise the potential of Alexander McQueen, offering him a place on the course when he approached her about a cutter's job. When McQueen received an honorary doctorate from Saint Martins, he thanked Hillson first of all. In addition to McQueen, Hillson's former students include John Galliano, Stephen Jones, Rifat Özbek and Sonja Nuttall. She was succeeded as course director of the MA Fashion course by another former student, Louise Wilson in 1992.
