= Ashley Williams (designer) =

British fashion designer (born 1988)

- Born: 28 July 1988 (age 37); Dubai, United Arab Emirates
- Education: University of Westminster
- Occupation: Fashion designer
- Known for: Fashion design
- Website: https://ashleywilliamslondon.com/

Ashley Williams (born 28 July 1988) is a British fashion designer.

== Early life ==
Williams was born in Dubai and lived there until age 12. She graduated with a bachelor's degree in fashion design from the University of Westminster in 2012.

== Career ==
Williams showed her first collection as part of Fashion East in February 2013, who she showed for three seasons before making her first solo runway show at London Fashion Week in September 2014 with her S/S 2015 collection.

She was a recipient of the British Fashion Council's Newgen award in 2014, and continued to receive this for a number of seasons. Williams won Emerging Designer of The Year at the ELLE Style Awards 2015.

Georgia May Jagger, Lili Sumner, and Claire Barrow have all modelled for her.

Williams has collaborated with Superga, Red or Dead and others.
