= Judy Blame =

British fashion stylist (1960–2018)

- Born: 12 February 1960; Leatherhead, Surrey
- Died: 19 February 2018 (aged 58)
- Occupations: British fashion stylist, accessories designer and punk iconoclast.

Judy Blame (12 February 1960 – 19 February 2018) was a British fashion stylist, accessories designer and punk iconoclast.

== Early life ==
Judy Blame was born Christopher Barnes in 1960 in Leatherhead, Surrey, and grew up in Spain and Devon. He ran away to London at age 17 “to become a punk”, but because he knew nobody there he decided to spend the next two years in Manchester, which had its own lively scene. Among influences he encountered was graphic designer Peter Saville. “It was freedom for me so I was really happy. I came back to London at the time of the New Romantic look and that’s when I became more aware of fashion,” Blame says in the SHOWstudio video made in 2010.

== Career ==
On returning to London and its club scene, Barnes changed his name to Judy Blame; "Judy" was a nickname given to him by designer Antony Price, and the surname "Blame" was suggested by Scarlett Cannon, a hairdresser friend. Blame said he deliberately assumed a female name in order to confuse people. When asked his birth name, Blame refused to answer.

Along with Scarlett, in 1981, Blame ran a fashion-forward club-night called "Cha-Cha" at the London nightclub Heaven.

Blame's punk aesthetic as a stylist and image-maker helped influence magazines such as The Face and i-D throughout the 1980s and 1990s. During the mid-1980s, along with designers John Moore and Christopher Nemeth, Blame was part of a collective called "The House of Beauty and Culture".

Blame's creations, often on a large scale, deployed a wide range of scrap metal and found objects to create statement pieces. During the 1980s he worked closely with the stylist Ray Petri, who was a significant figure on the London club scene of the 1980s, and also collaborated with Leigh Bowery. Blame designs were worn by Duran Duran and The Transmitters. Blame also worked as a stylist for Neneh Cherry, Boy George, Björk and Kylie Minogue.

Among the designers Blame collaborated with are John Galliano, Richard Nicoll, Christopher Shannon and Louis Vuitton. For Rei Kawakubo at Comme des Garçons Blame designed a male accessories line. In 2005, he was selling his work through Kawakubo's Dover Street Market, and also provided designs for Gareth Pugh.

Blame's work was exhibited at the V&A and in 2016 was the subject of a retrospective at London's Institute of Contemporary Arts, where curator Matt Williams described him as “a polymath and an inspiration”, with an ability “to respond to the detritus of the everyday or an image that touches upon pertinent social and political themes of its time”.

== Death and tributes ==
Judy Blame died on 19 February 2018, aged 58, one week after his 58th birthday. Dylan Jones, editor-in-chief of GQ, wrote: “He was an artist, a genuine one, someone who could cherry pick cultural detritus and then mix it all together to create something new, something lasting.” Caroline Rush, Chief Executive British Fashion Council, said of Blame: “The fashion world has lost a creative genius and many in the industry have lost a dear friend. His contribution to fashion, art and design saw him collaborate with music legends and fashion’s brightest stars. He was a true innovator and an incredible part of London’s creative community.” Nick Knight, photographer and director of SHOWstudio, said of Blame: “Always totally unique, always a champion of the underdog, always fiercely anti-fascist and anti-establishment, always inspiring, always so immensely talented and always one hundred % brilliant.”

Blame's obituary in The Times explains his preoccupation with objets trouvés fashioned into fantastical necklaces, outré earrings, outrageous brooches and other items of bricolage. “I didn’t have any fear about using something that wasn’t classic jewellery material,” he said. “Because I had no training, I didn’t have any parameters. When we haven’t got the money, we have to use our imagination.” Certainly bling was never this thing. “I don’t think that a diamond is better than a safety pin; to me it’s just a thing or a shape. I see beauty in everything,” he said. It was a punk aesthetic that meant buttons, bits of string, tin foil, champagne corks, etc. were featured in his creations.

The editor-in-chief of British Vogue magazine Edward Enninful wrote: “Judy never fell out of touch with what was going on in the world: whether he was working for i-D in the Eighties, creating pieces for the first Dover Street Market or collaborating with Louis Vuitton and Moschino over the past few years, he has always been at the forefront of the creativity zeitgeist, and he’s never lost sight of the next generation.”

In 2024, Boy George composed a song in tribute and performed it live at every show of his USA tour that year. The song, still unreleased but already recorded as a dance track and a country version, is called "Mrs. Blame".
