= Markus Lupfer =

German fashion designer

Markus Lupfer is a German fashion designer and founder of the eponymous company, based in London, United Kingdom.

== Life and career ==
Lupfer was born in Kisslegg, a small town in Southern Germany. After attending the University of Trier he moved to the UK to study fashion design at London's University of Westminster. Notable alumni include well-known designers such as Vivienne Westwood and Burberry's former chief executive officer Christopher Bailey.

After graduating from Westminster in 1997 with a first-class honors degree, his final year collection was bought by Koh Samui, a London-based boutique, and sold out within two weeks.

In 1999, Lupfer made his prêt-à-porter debut at the London Fashion Week.

== Brand ==
Lupfer is sold in many high-end retailers worldwide including Harrods, Selfridges, Harvey Nichols, Net-A-Porter, IT Hong Kong, Le Bon Marche Paris, Isetan, Hanwha Galleria, Shopbop, and Tsum. The brand launched an e-commerce store in 2014.

== Awards ==
Lupfer won his first award in 2001, the British Fashion Council's New Generation Award, shortly after leaving university.

In 2008, Lupfer received the Best Designer of the Year Award at the Prix de la Mode Awards in Spain and two years later, in June of 2010, became the International Designer of the Year at the Scottish Fashion Awards.

== Notable Clients ==
Lupfer's designs have been worn by celebrities such as Rihanna, Madonna, Beyoncé, Miley Cyrus, Jennifer Lopez, Katy Perry, Olivia Palermo, Ellie Bamber, Maisie Williams, Cara Delevingne, Elle Macpherson, Salma Hayek and Claudia Schiffer. In addition, the Duchess of Cambridge has worn the brand during her Royal Tour to Germany in 2017.
