= Natasha Zinko =

Ukrainian artist

- Education: Central Saint Martins College of Art & Design in London, UK
- Occupations: Jewellery and fashion designer
- Spouse: Volodymyr Galanternyk
- Awards: Fashion Show 2008 Central St.Martins, London; Swarovski Trend Forecast Award 2007/8, London 2007
- Website: natashazinko.com

Natasha Zinko (born in Odesa, Ukraine) is a London-based fashion and jewelry designer. She specialises in women’s wear and jewellery design with her main boutique in London, United Kingdom.

== Early life ==
In her early life, Zinko studied law, but ultimately became a fashion designer.

Natasha pursued fashion design at the Central Saint Martins, where she learned the basics of jewellery design. Zinko later created her own jewellery brand and ready-to-wear clothes for women.

She stated, “When I was doing my foundation at Chelsea College of Art and Design I discovered I was good with 3D sculpture, but since I don’t like working with big things, small-scale design really felt like the right thing. When I applied to Central Saint Martin’s to study jewellery design that was my main focus“.

“Jewellery design always comes through my emotions and feelings. I believe that jewellery could have a protective power, like a charm. Designing jewellery, you are thinking 3D on a smaller scale, while making clothes gives you the opportunity to play with bigger dimensions. Clothing is always inspired by my day-to-day life and surroundings.”

== Awards and achievements ==
- 2009–Winner of ‘Cool Diamonds’Award, London, UK
- 2008–Winner of First Jewellery Prize of Harold Hobbs Memorial Process Award 2007/8
- The Workshopfil Company of Tin Plate
- Workers Alias Wire Workers, London, UK
- Fashion Show 2008 Central St.Martins, London
- Swarovski Trend Forecast Award 2007/8, London 2007
- British Art Medal Society touring exhibition
