= Christopher Shannon =

English fashion designer

- Born: Liverpool
- Website: http://www.christophershannon.co.uk

Christopher Shannon is an English fashion designer specialising in menswear.

== Early life and education ==
A Liverpudlian, Shannon graduated from Central Saint Martins with an MA in Menswear, studying under Louise Wilson.

== Career ==
After working with the designers Judy Blame, Kim Jones, William Baker, and the fashion label Helmut Lang, he launched his business at the end of the first decade of the 2000s with sponsorship from NEWGEN MEN, a programme launched by the British Fashion Council and Topman for supporting up-and-coming British menswear designers. When Shannon presented his Spring/Summer 2011 collection at Men's Day at London Fashion Week in September 2010, the fashion journalist Charlie Porter named him as one of the two key designers of the day for his contemporary, colour-blocked streetwear-influenced pieces. His work combines elements of masculine sportswear with unexpected details such as traditionally feminine frills, folklore influences, or patchwork and embroidery.

Along with Nasir Mazhar and Michael van der Ham, Shannon was asked by Danny Boyle to design costumes for dancers in the 2012 Summer Olympics opening ceremony.

In additional to his mainline collection Shannon has consulted for and collaborated with many brands including Reebok, Colette (boutique), Opening Ceremony (brand), Eastpak, Cambridge Satchel Company, Kickers, Caterpillar Inc., Zippo, River Island, Topman and in 2017 launched his first fragrance with Mark Buxton and Verduu. He has also contributed in a styling capacity to magazines such as Arena Homme Plus, i-D and Man About Town.

== Recognition ==
Shannon was the recipient of the inaugural BFC/GQ Designer Menswear Fund, supported by Vertu, in June 2014. He has been nominated for the Emerging Menswear Award at the British Fashion Awards and the LVMH Young Fashion Designer Prize, and been involved in the innovative MAN, NEWGEN and Fashion Forward sponsorship schemes.

Celebrities who have worn his designs include Drake, Rihanna, Tyga, Rae Sremmurd J Hus, Chris Brown, Stormzy, Labrinth, Kylie Minogue, ASAP Rocky, Olly Alexander, Louis Tomlinson, Iggy Azalea, Neneh Cherry, and Mabel.
