= Alicia Dorado =

Galician anarchist

- Born: December 1911; A Coruña
- Died: 10 July 1937 (aged 25); A Coruña
- Cause of death: Shot in house raid
- Political party: Federación Anarquista Ibérica

Alicia Dorado or Alicia Dorado Viso, (December 1911 - 10 July 1937), was a Galician anarchist.

A notable member of the Federación Anarquista Ibérica (FAI) in Galicia, she was murdered along with her partner and other anarchists during a Civil Guard raid on her home

== Biography ==
She was born in December 1911. Dorado was in a relationship with another anarchist, Julio Acevedo Veiga. She seemed to take on a coordinating role in the Federación Anarquista Ibérica (FAI), as she established connections between key figures of the movement in Galicia. During this time, she rented an apartment at 6 del Carmen Street in La Coruña and worked as a baker, having been dismissed from her job as a weaver due to her revolutionary activities.

=== Death ===
Dorado was at home, where she was hiding two FAI leaders, when a Civil Guard raid hit the neighborhood. She was betrayed by someone who was captured and tortured. The guards entered the building, shooting and killing all the anarchists present. Her partner managed to escape after defending himself, fleeing across a rooftop, but he was caught in a nearby street and shot in the back.
