= Masato Jones =

British fashion designer (born 1978)

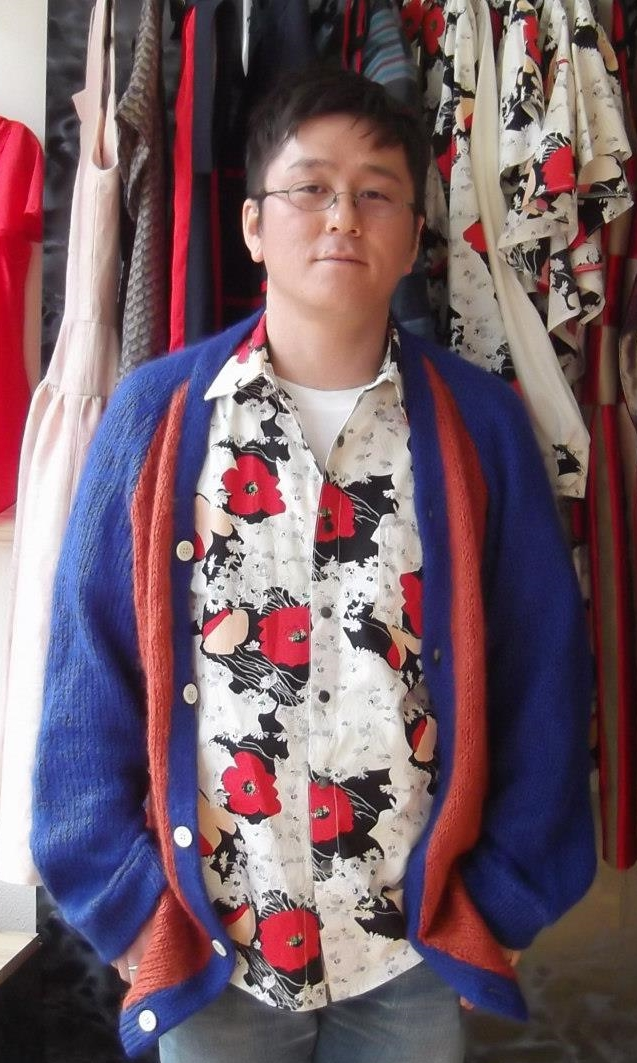
- Jones in 2013
- Born: 1978 (age 47–48); Tokyo, Japan
- Education: Central Saint Martins College of Art and Design
- Label: MASATO LONDON

Masato Jones (born 1978) is a British-based fashion designer, who started his own label MASATO in 2011 after graduating from Central Saint Martins College of Art and Design. His collections have been showcased at several Fashion Weeks including in the UK: Brighton, Cheltenham, Essex, Leeds, Liverpool and Manchester, and also at Nürnberg in Germany.

== Early life ==
Masato was born in Tokyo, Japan, where he grew up before training and qualifying as a hairdresser. After a visit to the UK Masato decided to move to Brighton, East Sussex, to learn English and subsequently made the decision that his future lay in fashion.

== Career ==
In 2005 Masato enrolled on a fashion degree at Central Saint Martins College of Art and Design. After passing his degree, Masato took an internship with Giles Deacon in September 2007 and was one of the creative pattern cutters in the team, taking a break from Giles for a season to be head designer at the London fashion label Ghost from October 2011 to April 2012. He has also worked with the designer Kinder Agguguni, and designed and created costumes for a promotional campaign for the English National Ballet. Masato decided to set up his own haute couture label in 2011 which he launched at Essex Fashion Week, which was followed by Brighton Fashion Week 2 months later. Masato has designed for the singer Beverley Knight MBE and he also teaches at Ravensbourne (College) in London

=== Style and collections ===
His Spring/Summer 2013 collection was shown at the finale of Liverpool Fashion Week in October 2012 and Sameena Bruce subsequently praised the collection in the 'Style etc.' Magazine. The collection was also shown at 'Fashion Days' in Nürnberg, Germany in February 2013 and he was the showcase designer at the finale of the 'Cheltenham Fashion Week' in April.

Masato opened the Leeds Fashion Show 'Dress Me Beautiful MMXIII' event in October 2013 where he showcased his Spring 2014 collection and was subsequently the personal favourite on a list of notable designers from the event

His new store opened in Thornton's Arcade Leeds in May 2021.

=== Collaborations ===
Masato has collaborated with the UK couture jewellery designer LATIMER.
