= Claire Barrow =

English artist and fashion designer

- Education: University of Westminster
- Known for: Art, fashion

Claire Barrow is an English artist. Known for her unique hand-painted leather jackets and caricature illustrations, Barrow does not view being an artist and a designer as mutually exclusive, but rather integrates both aspects into her work. Barrow is currently based in London, using British culture as an inspiration in her art. Barrow is, also, inspired by the idea of consumerism and its effect on art. She, like Burberry, has rejected traditional ideas of the fashion system and announced in 2021 that she would no longer show her designs in accordance with the traditional seasonal model, preferring to focus on creating fashion and art without the motivation of consumerism.

== Life ==
Barrow grew up in Stockton-on-Tees, in northeast England. She studied at Conyers School in Middlesbrough and did a BTEC National Diploma in Fashion Design at Cleveland College of Art and Design (now the Northern School of Art), before she moved to London in 2008 to study Fashion at the University of Westminster. In 2012, she graduated from the University of Westminster with a degree in Fashion Design. Before graduating, she received her first big break from the fashion editor at British Vogue, Fransesca Burns. One of her hand-painted leather jackets was featured in Vogue, another in i-D and another on Rihanna. Despite the break in her career, Barrow still finished her degree. After her graduate collection was featured on the catwalk, Fashion East founder Lulu Kennedy quickly picked her up. Just one year after her graduate collection she made her London Fashion Week debut with Fashion East and then began exhibiting with NEWGEN.

== Style ==
Barrow has defined her own style as "car boot sale". Others have described her style as neo-primitivism. Barrow has grown tired of people inquiring whether she is a fashion designer or artist. She explained in an interview, "The question is always, 'Is it fashion or art?'" This prompted "the Retro-Spective" her own fake retrospective, which combined the two demonstrating that she's both an artist and a fashion designer.

== Selected works ==
- 2015: Same Shoes, M Goldstein Gallery, London.
- 2017: Dancing with Dreams, Galeria Melissa, London.

== Selected exhibitions ==
- 2016: Fish Wifes, (with Reba Maybury) Paramount Ranch, Agoura Hills, California.
- 2016: Retro-Spective, Institute of Contemporary Arts, London.
- 2016: The Bed, the Bath and The Beyond, M Goldstein Gallery, London.

== List of Barrow's collections ==
- Spring/Summer 2013 – Untitled
- Autumn/Winter 2013 – Untitled
- Spring/Summer 2014 – Untitled
- Autumn/Winter 2014 – Untitled
- Spring/Summer 2015 – Untitled
- Autumn/Winter 2015 – High Flyers
- Spring/Summer 2016 – Broken Machines
- Autumn/Winter 2016 – Untitled
