= Gary Card (artist) =

British artist

- Born: 21 July 1981 (age 44); Bournemouth, England
- Education: Central Saint Martins, London
- Website: garycard.co.uk

Gary Card (born 1981) is a British artist and set designer.

== Career ==
=== Early commercial work ===
Card graduated from Central Saint Martins in 2001 in Theatrical Design and initially worked as a graphic designer. His first major commission was a series of mask-like covers for the 2006 Penguin re-print of Franz Kafka's novels.

=== Set design ===
Early set design opportunities came via stylist Nicola Formichetti, for whom Card produced latex "bone masks" and other sculptural props later featured in Lady Gaga's The Monster Ball Tour (2009–11). In 2011 he conceived the plywood-tunnel interior for concept store LN-CC in Dalston, an "enchanted-forest" retail space shortlisted for the Design Museum's Designs of the Year award (2012) and redesigned by Card in 2024.

Card has designed runway and campaign environments for fashion houses including Louis Vuitton, Comme des Garçons and Gucci. His production design for Jean Paul Gaultier's "Divine" fragrance film received a 2024 D&AD Wood Pencil for Fashion Film (Production Design).

=== Art practice ===
Card's multidisciplinary practice includes painting, sculpture and installation, frequently engaging with themes of consumerism, nostalgia, popular culture and excess. He is known to work using non-typical materials such as masking tape and found objects.

His first major exhibition, Hysterical (Phillips, London 2019), was an immersive installation showcasing his sculptures and paintings alongside works by Cindy Sherman, George Condo, Paul McCarthy and Erik Parker, among others. The show explored comedic and cartoonish themes through new site-specific works and limited-edition art toys.

In 2024, Card staged People Mountain People Sea at Oi! Art Space in Hong Kong, his first large-scale solo exhibition. The show featured paintings, sculptures, digital animations and a large-scale outdoor sculpture, examining visual influences drawn from Hong Kong's blend of Eastern and Western cultural elements.

Card has also exhibited internationally at spaces including Museum of Contemporary Art Tokyo, Nanzuka Underground (Tokyo), Plaster Store (London), MIMA (Brussels), Chi K11 Art Museum (Shanghai).

== Exhibitions ==
- Homunculand, W1 Curates London, UK (2025)
- Gathering Dust, Plaster London, UK (2025)
- People Mountain, People Sea, Oi! (Hong Kong) Hong Kong (2024)
- Hysterical, Phillips London, UK (2019)
