= Reba Maybury =

Artist, writer, lecturer, feminist and political dominatrix

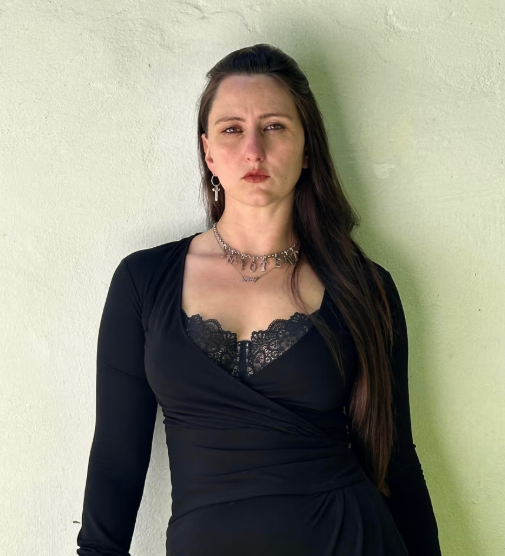
- Born: Oxford, England
- Education: Central Saint Martins
- Occupation: Artist
- Years active: 2015–present
- Website: rebamaybury.com

Reba Maybury (born 1990), is a British-Pakistani artist, writer, lecturer, and dominatrix, sometimes known as Mistress Rebecca. Maybury's work has garnered international attention for the ways in which it deconstructs the economic-capitalist underpinnings of both sex work and the commercial art world. Maybury has exhibited internationally and describes men as her medium, reflecting that much of her artwork is made by her male submissives through her control and direction.

== Early life and education ==
Maybury was born in Oxford in 1990 to a Pakistani mother and a Welsh father and has a younger sister. She graduated in Fashion History and Theory in 2013 at the faculty of arts and design Central Saint Martins in London.

== Artistic practice ==
A central focus of Maybury’s artistic practice is the tension between the power she wields as a dominatrix and the gendered dynamics of such an interaction between men and women, as in the case of sex work. In subjecting her male submissives to such menial tasks of labour (for instance, drawing the cover art for a show in pencil), Maybury transforms her position as an object of fantasy in men’s eyes into a tangible power over them.

In 2018 Maybury gained widespread unwanted attention when a tabloid reported on her apparent ‘political re-education’ of her typically conservative submissives; Maybury has written not only about the hypocrisy of such submissives who find themselves sexually attracted to dominant women yet deny their rights outside of session, but also the vitriolic reaction and hateful abuse she suffered in the right-wing press because of it. She writes, “Sex is about play and I want to play with politics too.” This has earned her the moniker of ‘political dominatrix’.

Her work has drawn comparison with Toulouse-Lautrec’s famous compositions of sex workers, often captured in moments of repose between their acts of sexual labour. Maybury’s configuration is far more provocative, however, as here men — the clients — are the ones made to work on these as paint-by-number kits, the final product then given to Maybury as her property.

Ugelvig describes how Maybury’s ‘Used Men’ series (2021) depicts the clothes of a presumably naked male submissive, an image we are left to imagine for ourselves, strewn across the floor of the gallery space, “safely re-branded as artwork”. Though Maybury’s submissives are in fact her mutual, consenting collaborators, the joke is very much on them and, in a spirit of reactionary feminism, they do not receive credit. Maybury, then, simultaneously lampoons stereotypes about the art world whilst illuminating the discontinuous imbalances of power in sex work. This approach is arguably materialist in nature, stressing the labour at play in any such interactions, both visible and invisible.

She teaches a class on critical thinking through Central Saint Martins’ MA Fashion course and has previously taught at HEAD, Geneva, Kunstakademie Düsseldorf, University of Applied Arts Vienna and Copenhagen Art Academy, Sculpture School.

== Exhibitions ==
Solo/duo exhibitions

- From Paris With Love: The Book, Tiny Mutual Admiration Societies, Vienna, 2024
- From Paris With Love, Treize, Paris, 2022
- Faster than an erection, Museum of Contemporary Art (MACRO), Rome, 2021
- Moralists at a Costume Party, Huset for Kunst og Design, Holstebro, Denmark, 2021
- A-good-individual, schwarzescafé LUMA Westbau, Zürich, 2019
- My Deep Secret (with Will Sheldon), Arcadia Missa, London, 2018
- Fish Wives (with Claire Barrow), Paramount Ranch (with Shoot The Lobster), United States, 2016

Group exhibitions

- SexKino Roland, NEXPO, Zürich, 2022
- In the Company of, Eden Eden Isabella Bortolozzi, Berlin, 2022
- The Puppet Show, Centre d’art Contemporain, Geneva, 2022
- Isabella, Associazione Barriera, Turin, 2022
- The Baroness, Mimosa House, London, 2022
- sub/dominium curated by SoiL Thornton, Chateau Shatto, Los Angeles, 2021
- Put A Sock In It!, Sophie Tappinier, Vienna, 2021
- Exhibition For Your Apartment, Dawid Radziszewski Gallery, Warsaw, 2021
- In Excess, 3hD, Power Play, Berlin, 2021
- Witchhunt, Kunsthal Charlottenborg, Copenhagen, 2020
- The Monstrous Bouquet, Omstand, Arnhem, 2020
- Do You Love Me?, P.P.O.W, New York, 2019
- Paint, Also Known as Blood, Museum of Modern Art, Warsaw, 2019
- I, I, I, I, I, I, I, Kathy Acker, ICA, London, 2019
- Putting Out, Gavin Brown’s Enterprise, New York, 2018
- Prick Up Your Ears!, Karma International, Los Angeles, 2018
- Hardcore, Sadie Coles HQ, London, 2023

== Bibliography ==
- From Paris with Love, Wet Satin Press, 2024
- Faster than an erection, with a poem by Cassandra Troyan, Wet Satin Press and MACRO, 2021
- BINTS! A Conversation Between Mistress Rebecca and the Elysium Harvester, Wet Satin Press, 2019
- Dining with Humpty Dumpty, Wet Satin Press, 2017 and Arcadia Missa, 2019
- The Goddess and the Worm, Wet Satin Press, 2015
