= Lina Dorado =

Colombia-born American photographer

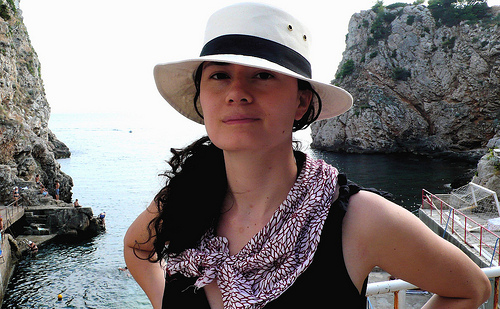
- Lina Dorado-August 2008
- Born: Lina Isabel Dorado; April 2, 1975 (age 51); Bogotá, Colombia, South America
- Occupations: Artist, filmmaker
- Years active: 1994–present

Lina Dorado (born April 2, 1975) is a contemporary artist and filmmaker based in New York City noted for her multimedia work and travel photography, Lina Dorado has authored two books in bilingual editions: Doble Vista / Second Sight (Arte Dos Gráfico-Editores) and Drawing Only, Solo Dibujo (Villegas Editores) alongside her long-term collaborator: Luis Cantillo. Their book Doble Vista / Second Sight written by Dorado and photographs by both was acquired by the New York Public Library Museum of Modern Art in New York MOMA and the Whitney Museum for their Artists' Books Collection. In August 2018 her first feature film Pelucas y Rokanrol was theatrically released in Colombia, the film was directed by Mario Duarte and written by Mario Duarte and Lina Dorado .

== Early life and education ==
Born in Bogotá she attended a screenwriting seminar at 16 years old with the writer and producer Juana Uribe and landed a job writing for television as part of the creative writing team behind the TV series "De Pies a Cabeza", that went on to write many T.V hits including Colombia's Betty la Fea ( Now the American comedy-drama television series Ugly Betty).

Dorado entered the B.A program in Fine Arts at the Universidad Nacional de Colombia, where she was awarded for three consecutive terms the academic recognition matricula de honor (gaining top marks in her class with the right to free registration the following year). Dorado then moved to London earning a BA(Hons.) degree in Fine Arts specialized in Film and Video at Central Saint Martins College of Art and Design.

With a First Class Honours degree from Central Saint Martins, Dorado applied to the graduate film program at Columbia University in New York City. She graduated from Columbia University in 2006 earning an MFA in film directing.

== Filmmaking ==
After publishing two books and widely exhibiting her art work, she concentrated on her film work for which she is best known: She directed 2 AM, Two Around The Mountain (2005), premiered in New York at the Brooklyn Museum her first feature documentary: Dalai Lama, Colombia. Backstage previewed in New York city at the Maysles Institute in March of 09 and in the Tibet Center in DUMBO. Dorado has acted as a story editing advisor for films such as: Gogol Bordello Non-Stop (2008), Directed by Margarita Jimeno, and Abraham-Obama (2009) Directed by Kevin Chapados.In April 2009 Dorado traveled to India where she shot and directed a series of shorts about Tibetan Communities in exile, documenting the program of the Namgyal Monastery "The Heart of Tibet in Exile", organized by the Monastery of the 14th Dalai Lama.

As a music video film director she collaborated with musician and actor Mario Duarte Mario Duarte and his rock band La Derecha La Derecha, she wrote and directed a video titled The Specialist and the Eye". for their song "El Puñal". As of November 2012, the video had surpassed the one million views on YouTube. and the song was nominated as best rock alternative song of the year 2012 by the Colombian music magazine Shock

In August 2018 her first feature film Pelucas y Rokanrol had a theatrical release in cinemas in diverse cities of Colombia, the film was directed by Mario Duarte and written by Mario Duarte and Lina Dorado .

== Short films ==
In 2012, Dorado directed a short documentary video about the Abbot Investiture of Tibetan Buddhist monk and photographer [Nicholas Vreeland]] commissioned by the Tibet Center This is a small document of an event of historic importance since Vreeland is the first Westerner appointed abbot of a Tibetan Buddhist monastery

== Personal life ==
Born in Bogotá, Colombia, she is the daughter of actor and screenwriter Humberto Dorado and painter Maria Moran. She worked alongside contemporary artist Luis Cantillo for over ten years they claim to "continue to comment and participate in each others endeavors" but each of them currently pursues their own individual work while admitting that their career "continues to be informed and influenced by their extraordinary artistic collaboration". Dorado lives in New York city with her long-term partner, whom she married in 2011.

== Selection of exhibitions and projects ==
- 2005 – Viper Video and New Media Festival, Basel, Switzerland
- 2005 – Brooklyn International Film Festival, Brooklyn Museum, Brooklyn, USA
- 2005 – Independents Film Festival, Tampa, Florida, USA
- 2005 – 2 AM (Dos Alrededor de la Montaña), Alliance Française, Bogotá, Colombia (solo)
- 2004 – Doble Vista, Galería Diners, Bogotá, Colombia (solo)
- 2004 – Field of depth, Latin Collector, New York
- 2004 – Urbes Interiores, Luis Angel Arango, Bogotá, Colombia
- 2004 – A deux, Web Project, Forum de l’Image, Toulouse, Francia
- 2004 – Errancias, Centro Cultural Comfandi, Cali, Colombia
- 2003 – Afuera, Museo de Arte Universidad Nacional, Bogotá, Colombia (solo)
- 2003 – Errancias, Valenzuela y Klenner Arte Contemporaneo, Bogotá, Colombia
- 2003 – Still Life / Naturaleza Muerta, Biblioteca Luis Angel Arango, Bogotá, Colombia
- 2003 – V Bienal de Venecia Bogotá, Centro Comunal Venecia, Bogotá, Colombia
- 2003 – Solo Dibujo, Museo de Arte Universidad Nacional, Bogotá, Colombia
- 2003 – 16 FilmWinter, Stuttgart, Alemania
- 2002 – Airborne, Midlanda KonstHall, Timra, Suecia
- 2002 – File 2002, Instituição Cultural Paço das Artes, São Paulo, Brazil
- 2002 – EntreCasa, Galeria SantaFe, Bogotá, Colombia
- 2002 – Portatil, Museo de Arte Universidad Nacional, Bogotá, Colombia
- 2001 – What we did on our holidays, Hastings Museum of Art, Inglaterra
- 2001 – Travellers’ Tales InIVA, Londres, Inglaterra
- 2001 – Mobil Art, Gallery Rocket, Harajuku, Tokyo, Japan
- 2000 – A.U.R.E.L.S. Galerie d'Aurel, Francia
- 2000 – Transito, Museo de Arte Universidad Nacional, Bogotá, Colombia
- 2000 – Wigs, Diamonds and a Frozen Turkey, W.i.s.h. Gallery, Londres, Inglaterra
- 1999 – X-hibit 99, London Institute Gallery, Londres, Inglaterra
- 1999 – Barclays Drawing Award, Northampton, Inglaterra
- 1999 – Walk, Lambeth Walk, Londres, Inglaterra
- 1999 – Dislocation, Notting Hill Arts Club, Londres, Inglaterra
- 1998 – Emergencia, Museo de Arte de La Universidad Nacional, Bogotá, Colombia
- 1997 – 2nd Portobello Film & Video Festival, Londres, Inglaterra

== Books ==
2004

Doble Vista/Second Sight, Written by Lina Dorado. Photos by Lina Dorado and Luis Cantillo.Publisher: Arte Dos Grafico, Bogotá, Colombia

2001

Sólo Dibujo, Author. Original Concept :Lina Dorado curated by Luis Cantillo, Villegas Editores, Bogotá, Colombia

== Awards ==
Best Director Award, Columbia University (New York, 2004)

First Prize Fine Arts Short Film, New Screen TV (USA, 2006)

II Bienal Inter-Americana de Video (Washington D.C., 2004)

File Festival (Brazil, 2004).The Queen Elizabeth Scholarship, England.

Poporo Animation Story by Lina Dorado 1st Award, Inter-American Biennial of Video Art, Washington DC, USA 2004

2nd Award, Salón de Fotografía ´El Municipal´, Bogotá, Colombia 2002

Mención de honor, Barclays Drawing Award, Northampton, Inglaterra 1999

1st Award, XXIII Salón Francisco Antonio Cano, Bogotá, Colombia 1996

== Bibliography ==
El Tiempo Newspaper, Bogota, Colombia January 17, 2005

Semana Libros No.2, Cuando el libro es un objeto de arte, Luis A. Parra, Nov 4

NY Art Magazine, Carlos Motta, Summer 2004

Revista Cromos, 'Los que vuelven', Dominique Rodriguez, June-04

ArtNexus Magazine No.53, Review of "Still Life", Marta Rodríguez, Summer 2004

El Tiempo, Los recorridos de dos artistas nómadas, Paola Villamarín, 16-03-04

Revista Diners, 'Arte a duo' Margarita Garcia, March 2004

Revista Cromos, Dominique Rodriguez, 12-03-04

El Tiempo, Lecturas Dominicales, Trabajo Fotográfico de Dorado-Cantillo, Graham Ellard, 14-03-04

ArtNexus Magazine No.49, Review of "Solo Dibujo", Marta Rodríguez, Summer 2003

Arte en Colombia, Review of "Solo Dibujo", Marta Rodríguez, Summer 2003

Periodico UN, Miguel Huertas, Sólo Dibujo, April 20, 2003, p. 24.

Revista Cambio, Más allá del dibujo, Nelly Peñaranda, April 2003

Zona de Distención, Primer salón abierto de Fotografía, Carlos Sanabria, January 2003

A6, Revista Asterisco, 'Dibujo:Aforismo pretencioso, Jose Roca, 2002

Le Monde, Jeunes artistes en liberté à la Galerie d'Aurel, Jacques Bugier, August 25, 2000

== Collections ==
Biblioteca Luis Angel Arango, Bogotá, Colombia Museo de Arte Universidad Nacional, Bogotá, Colombia Museum of Modern Art (Colección libros de artista), Nueva York, EU Whitney Museum of American Art (Colección libros de artista), Nueva York, EU
