= Markos Kay =

Markos Kay (née Markos Christodoulou) is a visual artist, creative director, illustrator and lecturer based in London, best known for his artificial life video art experiment "aDiatomea" (2007), a permanent exhibit at the Phyletic Museum in Jena, Germany. His 3D generative short "The Flow" (2011) has been shown internationally as part of "Resonance" a collaboration of over 30 independent visual artists and sound designers. MRK's films have been exhibited worldwide, including OFFF Barcelona, Pause Fest Melbourne, Onedotzero London, Stroke Artfair Berlin and Viedram Rome.

== Biography ==
MRK graduated with a Master of Arts in Communication Design from Central St. Martins in 2007 and is currently working as a creative director, motion designer and lecturer.

In 2008, MRK released “aDiatomea,” an experimental piece that simulates diatoms consisting of realistic 3d generated diatoms. Each variant of these mathematical creatures is classified in actual taxonomies, giving Victorian diatom art a 21st-century redux. Granular sound is 'injected' into the diatoms affecting their form and movement, creating a dynamic system. In 2012, "aDiatomea" was part of the official selection at Imagine Science Films in New York.

In 2011, he took part in "Resonance," an international collaboration of over 30 independent visual artists and sound designers, with the short film "The Flow." Resonance premiered at the OFFF 2011 festival, and went on to become an international success. The Flow deals with the idea of emergence and supervenience in the quantum and physical worlds. In 2012, a segment of "The Flow" was featured in Breaking Bad season 5, episode 3. This coincided with the release of an annotated and extended version of the film. "The Flow" composers Echoic Audio won Best Sound Design at the Van d'Or Awards 2012.

During 2012, in collaboration with seeper, he directed large scale projection mapping events including the launch of Titanic Belfast, Birmingham's Wings of Desire and the Vimeo Awards 2012. Other commercial endeavours included work for the likes of Warner Bros., MTV, Nickelodeon and Channel 4. He also collaborated in the direction of the main titles for Dutch digital arts festival Playgrounds, which premiered in Amsterdam in November 2012. Later on that year he took part in another international collaboration "The Powers Project," a visual re-imagining of the Eames classic Powers of Ten. His segment was the first to be released as part of the promotion of the film.

MRK's work fuses science with visual art. He deals with themes of emergence, evolution and complexity, as well as artificial life and generative art processes. He is inspired by biological forms and processes, life and natural cycles, and deconstruction is a major influence. Other areas of interest include: molecular biology, digital physics, information theory and complexity science.

== Filmography ==
Notable Works

- Playgrounds Main Titles (2012)
- Powers Project (2012)
- Vimeo Awards (2012)
- Titanic 100th Anniversary (2012)
- Insect Traps (2012)
- The Flow (2011)
- aDiatomea (2008)
- Soundway: Introductory Video (2007)
- SuprEgo (2006)
- Yogoid (2005)

== Exhibits, screenings, publications ==
- Playgrounds Festival 2012 Amsterdam-Tilburg
- Imagine Science Films 2012 New York
- Refraction Kopparberg Unestablishment 2012 London
- Van D'Or Awards 2012 London
- Stash Magazine Issue 93
- Jotta Publication: Issue 1
- Screen Social 2012 London
- OFFF 2012 Book
- Resonance 2011 (International)
- Onedotzero 2011 London
- OFF 2011 Barcelona
- Cut out Festival 2011
- Pause Fest 2011 Melbourne
- Sonar 2011 Barcelona
- Viedram 2011 Rome
- Stroke Artfair 2001 Munich/Berlin
- Wallace Space 2010 London
- Phyletic Museum 2009–present Berlin
- MACD 2008 London
- We Are Here 2008 London
