= Jane Carr (fashion designer) =

British fashion designer

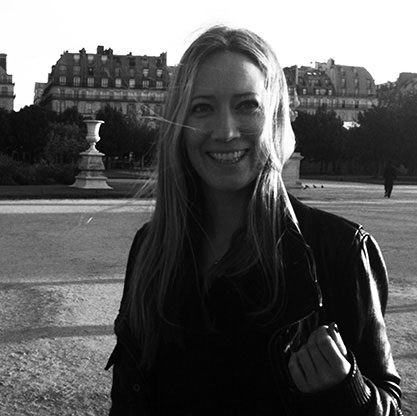
- Occupation: Fashion designer

Jane Carr, is a British fashion designer specialising in hand-finished accessories for men and women. Carr established a reputation through showing at London Fashion Week, Premiere Classe and Tranoi in Paris, as well as Pitti Uomo in Florence. She trained at Central St Martins, and graduated in 1999. After winning the International Wool Secretariat prize in 2000, she was hired by Donatella Versace to work as the Head of Prints at Fashion House Versace for 4 years. She then consulted for Balenciaga and Jil Sander before establishing her own label Jane Carr in 2005. Started as a hobby, designing for friends like model Sophie Dahl and Princess Alexandra of Greece, Carr's label soon earned a large following. Carr introduced modern, handmade Italian gloves to coordinate with her scarves and create a complete look at Paris Fashion Week in 2010. In 2011, Carr launched the men's range Jane Carr Homme.

Carr's silk scarves and leather gloves are produced by artisans in Northern Italy. With a strong focus on artisanal production, her labels continues to support the high craftsmanship of Italian silk and leather production and promote the concept of Made in Italy.

Her collections are now available worldwide in over 100 high-end fashion shops, including Selfridges, Harrods, Harvey Nichols, Brown Thomas, Colette, Printemps, Barneys, Neiman Marcus, Bergdorf Goodman, Bloomingdales, Joyce, Antonioli, Beymen and in 22 countries. A bespoke collection for men was launched exclusively for Tomorrowland Japan in autumn/winter 2012. She then collaborated with Wooyoungmi on an exclusive design for the brand's Paris pop-up store. Carr's work has been featured in publications including Vogue, GQ, and Grazia and have been worn by celebrities such as Miranda Kerr, Diane Kruger, and Sarah Jessica Parker.

In 2013, Carr joined the committee of Performance Art at the Whitney Museum of American Art in New York.
