= Charlie Porter (journalist) =

Fashion journalist (born 1973)

- Born: 1973; United Kingdom
- Occupations: Fashion journalist, editor, blogger.
- Years active: 1996–present
- Website: charlieporter.net

Charlie Porter (born 1973) is a British fashion journalist.

== Career ==
As he could not afford to study fashion journalism at Central Saint Martins, Porter became a researcher for The Daily Express in the mid-1990s. He eventually became an arts reporter, as commissioning editor for The Times and arts editor for Esquire. His first fashion-related post was as deputy fashion editor for The Guardian in 2000. Following this, Porter became an associate editor for GQ and deputy editor for the Amsterdam-based magazine Fantastic Man. By 2012, Porter had become a freelance journalist and also dedicated himself to fashion blogging. As of 2014, Porter writes for The Financial Times as their menswear critic. He has also contributed to i-D. He has been described as one of the most influential fashion journalists of his time.

As a representative of The Guardian and GQ, Porter was the journalist invited to choose the most representative looks for 2005 for the Fashion Museum, Bath's Dress of the Year collection. He chose a man's suit by Thom Browne and a green faille dress by Alber Elbaz for Lanvin. He is openly gay.

In recent years, Porter has published two nonfiction books about fashion. His book Bring No Clothes explores the clothing choices of the Bloomsbury Group from a philosophical perspective, while What Artists Wear examines the clothes of various artists, including Agnes Martin, Jean-Michel Basquiat, Georgia O'Keeffe, Cindy Sherman, and David Hammonds. His debut novel, Nova Scotia House, was published in March 2025, and was the winner of the Lambda Literary Award for Gay Fiction at the 38th Lambda Literary Awards in 2026.

== Bibliography ==
=== Nonfiction ===
- What Artists Wear, Penguin UK, 2021. ISBN 978-0141991252
- Bring No Clothes, Penguin UK, 2023. ISBN 978-0241602751

=== Fiction ===
- Nova Scotia House, Penguin UK, 2025. ISBN 9780241721049
