= Craig Green (designer) =

English fashion designer

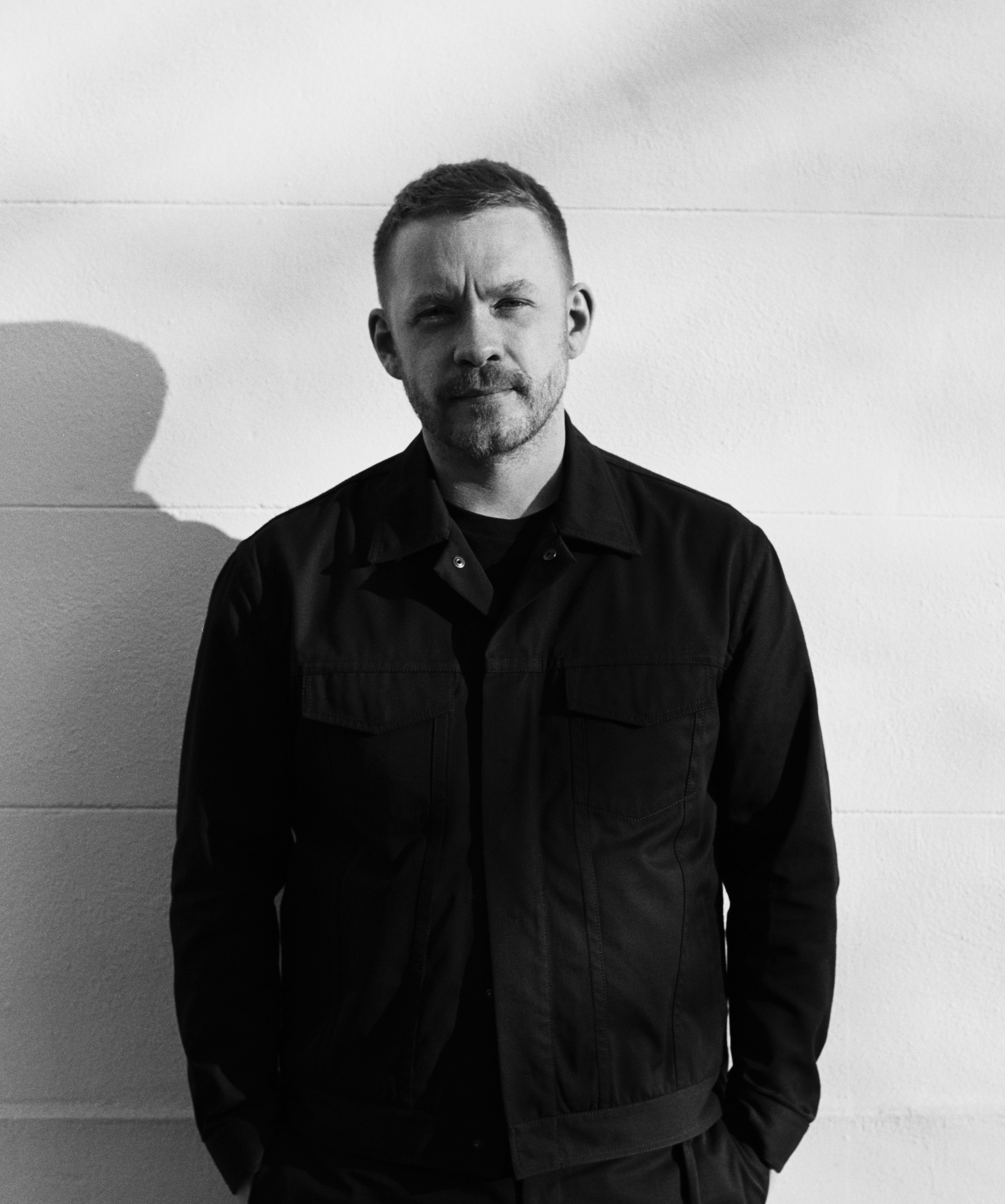
- Craig Green - 2018 Photographer: Jack Davison.
- Born: August 21, 1986. London, England
- Education: Central Saint Martins
- Occupation: Fashion designer
- Website: Official website

Craig Green MBE (born 1986) is a British fashion designer known for his conceptual approach to menswear, exploring themes of utility, vulnerability, and identity. Recognised as one of the most influential voices in contemporary menswear his work is noted for its emotive, sculptural forms and its reimagining of workwear and ceremonial dress.

Since establishing his eponymous label in 2012, Green has received several awards, including Emerging Menswear Designer at the British Fashion Awards (2014), Winner of the BFC/GQ Designer Menswear Fund (2016), British Menswear Designer at the Fashion Awards (2016, 2017, 2018), and an appointment as Member of the Order of the British Empire (MBE) in 2022 for services to fashion.

In 2023, Green was appointed Professor of Fashion Design and head of the Fashion Department (Modeklasse) at the University of Applied Arts Vienna.

== Early life ==
Born in London in 1986, Green grew up in the Hendon and Colindale areas of northwest London. He attended Hendon Secondary School before studying at Central Saint Martins., where he completed a Bachelor’s degree in Fashion Design (BA Fashion Design:Print) in 2010 and a Master’s in Fashion (MA Fashion) under Professor Louise Wilson, OBE, graduating in 2012. Green's MA graduation collection won the L’Oréal Professionnel Talent Award in 2012.

== Career ==
Green launched his eponymous label in 2012 and presented his debut collection in 2013 through Fashion East’s MAN initiative, a platform supporting emerging menswear designers. His early work drew critical acclaim for its sculptural silhouettes, hand-crafted detailing, and reinterpretations of workwear and uniforms.

Since then, Green has presented seasonal collections at both London and Paris Fashion Week, establishing a reputation for cohesive storytelling and concept-driven design.

Green has collaborated with brands including Adidas Originals, Moncler, Valentino, Fred Perry, Eastpak, Champion, and Ecco, producing footwear, apparel, and accessories that reflect a distinctive design language while demonstrating adaptability across diverse products and brand identities.

Green’s work also resonates within wider creative spheres. His designs have been featured in a range of major exhibits including the Metropolitan Museum of Art’s China: Through the Looking Glass in 2015, and 2018’s HEAVENLY BODIES: Fashion and the Catholic Imagination . The brand has also been commissioned to create costumes for Wayne McGregor’s Obsidian Tear at the Royal Opera House in 2016 and Ridley Scott’s Alien: Covenant in 2017.

== Collaborations ==
- adidas Originals (2019–2024)
- Moncler (2017–2022)
- Champion (Fall/Winter 2020)
- Valentino Garavani (Spring/Summer 2021)
- Eastpak (Spring/Summer 2025)
- Fred Perry (2024–2026)
- ECCO (2025-2026)

== Museum exhibitions ==
- The Metropolitan Museum of Art – **China: Through the Looking Glass** (2015).
- The Metropolitan Museum of Art – **Heavenly Bodies: Fashion and the Catholic Imagination** (2018).
- Victoria & Albert Museum – **Fashioning Masculinities: The Art of Menswear** (2022).
- Fashion Museum Antwerp – **Fashion & Interiors: A Gendered Affair** (2025).

== Awards ==
- 2014: Winner Emerging Menswear Designer, British Fashion Awards
- 2015: Winner Dress of the Year, Fashion Museum, Bath
- 2016: Winner BFC/GQ Designer Menswear Fund
- 2016: Winner Menswear Designer of the Year, British Fashion Awards
- 2017: Winner Menswear Designer of the Year, British Fashion Awards
- 2018: Winner Menswear Designer of the Year, British Fashion Awards
- 2022: appointed Member of the Order of the British Empire
- 2025: Winner of WALLPAPER*Design Awards

== Costume Design ==
- 2016: Costume design for Obsidian Tear by Wayne McGregor, The Royal Ballet, London.
- 2017: Costume design for Alien: Covenant by Ridley Scott.

== Key Shows ==
Autumn/Winter 2013 as part of London Collections: Men and Fashion East.

Spring/Summer 2015 as part of London Collections: Men and NEWGEN.

Spring/Summer 2018 at London Fashion Week Men's.

Spring/Summer 2019 Guest Designer at Pitti Uomo 94, Florence.

Autumn/Winter 2020 Debut show at Paris Fashion Week

Spring/Summer 2026 at Paris Fashion Week.

== Celebrities Wearing Craig Green ==
=== Music Artists ===
- Rihanna – ANTI Tour & V Festival
- Drake – Wireless festival & Would You Like a Tour?
- Jay-Z – 4:44 Tour
- Pusha T – DAYTONA Tour & Coachella
- Kendrick Lamar – The Damn Tour & Grammys performance 2018
- FKA Twigs – M3LL155X visual EP
- Skepta – Craig Green x Moncler
- Justin Bieber – Coachella
- The Weeknd – Worker Jacket

=== Other Celebrities & Personalities ===
- Bella Hadid – Adidas x Craig Green
- Steve McQueen – Tate retrospective & The Standard editorial
- Timothée Chalamet – Adidas x Craig Green
