= Sonja Nuttall =

British fashion designer (born 1964)

- Born: 28 January 1964 (age 62); Liverpool, England
- Education: St. Martin's College
- Website: www.sonjanuttall.com

Sonja Nuttall is a British fashion designer.

== Early life ==
Nuttall was born in Liverpool, England. She attended St. Martin's College and, in 1991, completed a Bachelor of Arts in Fashion Design and Textiles.

== Career ==
Nuttall had her first fashion show on the London catwalks in 1993 and was referred to as a "young Jil Sander." By 1996, she began selling her services as a consultant.

In 2004, Nutall, was one of Jill Sander's in-house design team. The team was responsible for fronting the designer temporarily, after the departure of Jill Sander. Nuttall had a fashion career in the nineties, which included consulting for companies like Marks & Spencer and Furla, in the fields of fashion and product design.

In 2010, Nutall helped other Urban Zen employees to set up a resting spot for attendees of the inaugural TEDWomen conference in Washington D.C.

== Charity work ==
As early as 1998, Nuttall participated in such causes as Put Smoking out of Fashion. In 2007-2012 Nuttall was employed by the Urban Zen Foundation. Nuttall currently makes leather and recycled watches which she sells online

Nuttall is also an active Buddhist and has studied under Myokyo-ni.
