= Clare Johnson =

American writer and artist

Clare Johnson is an American writer and artist from Seattle, Washington. Her work deals with parallel themes of memory.

== Early life ==
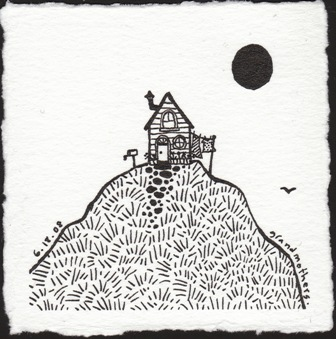
Grandmothers

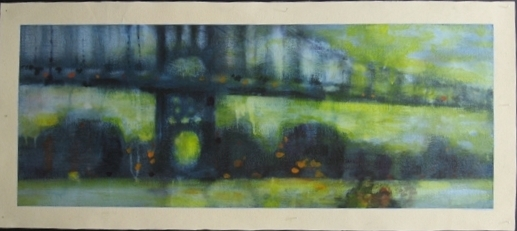
Long weekends

Johnson was technically trained at Brown University, Slade School of Fine Art, and Central St Martins College of Art and Design.

== Themes ==
Her ink drawings deal with the themes of loneliness, comfort, and disconsolation. Her work was originally inspired by imagery from nightly drawings on post-it notes. Johnson's drawings have been described as "intimate both in content and nature. Exploring personal illness and anxieties, her work is much more than art therapy, but a delicate, illustrative analysis of vulnerability, fear and the looming dangers of life both physical and metaphorical."

== Media ==
Johnson's paintings are exhibited on unframed, stretched canvas, which is intended to remind viewers that pictures miss as much as they reveal. On the subject of painting, she writes "I object to the belief that a painting should always be a statement about painting itself. If one has to extract such a statement from my paintings, it would be simply that paintings should relate to something significant about life, something worth spending that time on. They should be for anyone - for an unrestricted potential audience, rather than an elite group of experts."

== Career ==
She won numerous awards for her art and her writing, including the Michael S. Harper Poetry Prize in 2004. She was published in Blithe House Quarterly and Cranky Literary Journal, for which she was briefly an assistant editor.

Her artwork has been exhibited at Lauderdale House, the Jerwood Space and The Bargehouse Gallery in London. Johnson's 35 drawing piece, My Parents Told Me to Stay Calm, which formed part of the Deep Inspiration benefit for Asthma UK in 2007, received special mention by the organisers, including Gavin Turk. In 2009, her exhibitions included the Oxford Contemporary at Ovada (7 February to 21 March 2009) and Will I Live Here When I Grow Up? a solo show at The North Wall Gallery, Oxford (11–29 May 2009).

== Activism ==
Johnson has been a campaigner for LBGTQ rights since high school. At university, Johnson advocated for reforming her resident hall's gender criteria, arguing that the existing binary choices between male and female were discriminatory towards transgender students. In 2009, Johnson taught a children's stories class for Tower Hamlets Council Children's Services as part of LGBT History month.
