= Tata Naka =

Tata Naka (Georgian: თათა ნაკა) is a dress label owned by Georgian twin sisters Tamara and Natasha Surguladze based in London, UK.

Born in Tbilisi, Georgia the sisters moved in 1996 to London where they graduated from Central Saint Martins and created their label.
