= Louise Wilson =

British professor of fashion design (1962–2014)

Louise Wilson OBE
- Born: Louise Janet Wilson; 23 February 1962; Cambridge, England
- Died: 16 May 2014 (aged 52); Scotland
- Occupation: Professor of fashion design

Louise Janet Wilson OBE (23 February 1962 – 16 May 2014) was a British professor of fashion design. Wilson was based at Central Saint Martins College of Arts and Design in London, where she was the course director of their MA in Fashion from 1992 until 2014. Her former students include Alexander McQueen, Kanye West, Jonathan Saunders, Christopher Kane, Peter Jensen, Richard Nicoll, and Sophia Kokosalaki.

== Life and career ==
Wilson was born in Cambridge, England, moving to the Scottish Borders later in her childhood. After initially studying textiles at Galashiels Technical College, she went on to take a degree in fashion at Preston Polytechnic (later the University of Central Lancashire), graduating in 1984 with first class honours. In 1986 she gained an MA in Fashion with distinction from Saint Martin's School of Art (later Central St Martins).

She worked for various designers including Les Copains, Gianfranco Ferré and Daniel Hechter and as a designer for Guess jeans before becoming an associate lecturer at St Martins in the early 1990s. In 1992 she succeeded Bobby Hillson as the course director of the MA degree programme in Fashion Design. She moved to New York City in 1997 to become creative director for Donna Karan. After two years she returned to Central St Martins and was made a full professor in 1999, although she simultaneously continued to work for Donna Karan until 2002.

== Awards and honours ==
Wilson was appointed Officer of the Order of the British Empire (OBE) in the 2008 Birthday Honours for services to education and the fashion industry. In 2012 she received the Isabella Blow Award for Fashion Creator at the British Fashion Awards; on announcing the award the British Fashion Council described her as "one of the foremost educators of her generation".

== Personal life ==
Wilson had a long-term partner and a son who was in his twenties at the time of her death. She was treated for breast cancer, but continued to work during her treatment.

== Death and legacy ==
Wilson died in her sleep while visiting her sister in Scotland on 16 May 2014, aged 52.
