= Roksanda Ilinčić =

Serbian fashion designer (born 1975)

Roksanda Ilinčić MBE
- Роксанда Илинчић
- Born: 1975 (age 50–51); Belgrade, SR Serbia, SFR Yugoslavia
- Education: University of Arts in Belgrade, Central Saint Martins
- Occupations: Fashion designer, businesswoman
- Awards: 2012 Red Carpet Award, British Fashion Awards

Roksanda Ilinčić Bueno de Mesquita MBE (née Ilinčić; Serbian Cyrillic: Роксанда Илинчић, pronounced [rǒksaːnda ǐliːntʃitɕ]; born 1975) is a Serbian-born fashion designer based in London, England. She owns the fashion brand Roksanda (stylised in all caps), which she introduced in 2005 at London Fashion Week.

== Personal life ==
Roksanda Ilinčić was born in Belgrade, Serbia, and travelled extensively with her parents; her father Lazar was a businessman and her mother Ranka worked in public relations.

Ilinčić lives in north London with her husband and their daughter.

== Career ==
Ilinčić studied architecture and design at the Faculty of Applied Arts, University of Arts in Belgrade, before coming to study at Central Saint Martins in London in 1999, where she earned her master's degree in Womenswear.

She has been showing her collections on the London Fashion Week schedule since 2005, later adding leather goods to the ready-to-wear offering.

The first Roksanda store – a collaboration with architect David Adjaye – opened in June 2014 at 9 Mount Street in London's Mayfair.

In 2012, she won the Red Carpet Award at the British Fashion Awards. In 2013, she won the Red Carpet Designer Award at the British Elle Style Awards. In November 2014, she was named Business Woman of the Year at the Harper's Bazaar UK Women of the Year Awards, and in 2016, she won British Designer of the Year at Elle Style Awards.

In April 2016, Ilinčić's name was mentioned in the Panama Papers.

Roksanda designs were on display at the Women, Fashion, Power exhibit at the Design Museum; they have also been featured in the Victoria & Albert Museum's exhibition Ballgowns: British Glamour since 1950.

== Notable clients ==
The brand has been worn by Catherine, Princess of Wales, Rajwa Al Saif, Michelle Obama, Samantha Cameron, Cate Blanchett, Emily Blunt, Kristen Stewart, Amy Adams, Keira Knightley, and Melania Trump.

== Honours and awards ==
In 2018, Ilinčić received the Knight of the St. Sava Order of Diplomatic Pacifism award from the Serbian Minister of Foreign Affairs Ivica Dačić.

She was appointed Member of the Order of the British Empire (MBE) in the 2023 Birthday Honours for services to fashion design.
