= Richard Nicoll =

English fashion designer

- Born: Richard Philip Nicoll; 15 September 1977; Camden, London, England
- Died: 21 October 2016 (aged 39); Darlinghurst, Sydney, Australia
- Education: Central Saint Martins College of Art and Design
- Occupation: Fashion designer
- Label: Richard Nicoll
- Awards: 3 ANDAM prizes; Elle Style Awards Best Young Designer
- Website: richardnicoll.com

Richard Philip Nicoll (15 September 1977 – 21 October 2016) was an English fashion designer, best known for his work on modernist classics with the coined term "night-to-day" versatility.

Nicoll was awarded three Association Nationale pour le Développement des Arts de la Mode (ANDAM) prizes in 2008 and was named "Best Young Designer" at the Elle Style Awards during London Fashion Week 2009, along with twice being a BFC Vogue Fashion Fund finalist. Celebrities who have worn his designs include; Kylie Minogue, Kate Bosworth, Julianne Moore, Diane Kruger, Rosie Huntington-Whiteley, Sienna Miller, Emma Stone, Florence Welch, and Keira Knightley.

== Early life ==
Born to parents Alan Nicoll and Robyn Lynch, who works as a lawyer. His parents divorced when he was young. Nicoll was primarily raised by his father and stepmother.

== Career ==
Nicoll graduated from Central Saint Martins College of Art and Design in 2002 with an MA in Womenswear. His experience beyond the eponymous label included the creative direction of Cerruti Paris womenswear,(AW10, PRE SS11, SS11) freelance design for Marc Jacobs at Louis Vuitton (SS05 collection) and designing successful capsule collections for Topshop, and the top end Laurel line for Fred Perry.

He made his debut at London Fashion Week in February 2006 and continued to show every season thereafter until his death.

Nicoll had collaborated with artist Linder Sterling since AW09 on seasonal prints, and external projects such as designing costumes for her Darktown Cakewalk performance at the Chisenhale Gallery in London and for the subsequent Tim Walker Frieze Art Fair/Channel 4 film. The Richard Nicoll / Linder collaborative i-D Magazine shoot was awarded the cover in October 2009.

More recently he collaborated with Vodafone in the design of a mobile phone-charging handbag.

Nicoll's initial menswear training means he originally became known for his masculine spin on womenswear and has since evolved into a designer with a finely tuned, perfectly balanced feminine edge. Maintaining the integrity of his design vision whilst also creating a product that customers relate to is at the heart of the Richard Nicoll brand. His most recent work was for Jack Wills, as their new creative director; as of spring 2015, Nicoll parted ways with the company amicably in Autumn 2015.

== Death ==
Nicoll died suddenly in Darlinghurst, Sydney, Australia on 21 October 2016.
