= Sandra Boler =

Fashion journalist

Sandra Boler is an Australian-born British fashion journalist and former editor of Brides magazine from 1983 to the early 21st century. In this role she was a widely consulted authority on wedding-related matters from the 1980s to the early 21st century.

== Early life and education ==
Boler was born in Australia in 1943 and educated in Paris and London. At the age of 14, Boler and her Francophile father moved to France.

== Career ==
When she was 20, Boler worked for British Vogue as underwear editor under the supervision of Beatrix Miller.

In 1983, Boler became the editor of Brides magazine, another Condé Nast publication. In June 1999, the New Statesman commented that Boler had been editor of Brides for sixteen years, a typical example of the longevity of Condé Nast's editors. She stayed at Brides into the early 21st century, supervising the magazine's expansion into e-commerce in 2000. Boler recalled that she had been one of the first people to photograph Naomi Campbell, but did not use the pictures as she did not think Campbell likely to succeed, and that her failure to recognise the future supermodel's potential was a lasting regret.

In 1986, Boler was consulted over Sarah Ferguson's wedding dress. As an authority on the subject, she has been approached for commentary on other high-profile weddings, including that of Sophie Rhys-Jones to Prince Edward, Earl of Wessex in 1999, and Liza Minnelli's fourth marriage to David Gest in 2002. She has also commented on wedding-related issues including divorce ceremonies, the wedding boom of 1999, vow renewals, and even alternative wedding cakes.

In 1994, Boler was that year's chair of the British Society of Magazine Editors. The following year, the Fashion Museum, Bath invited her to choose the 1995 Dress of the Year for their permanent collection. Twenty years earlier, Anna Harvey, Boler's predecessor at Brides, had chosen a Gina Fratini bridal gown and Tommy Nutter bridegroom suit for the 1975 Dress of the Year. Boler's choice of a Catherine Rayner gown, Emma Hope shoes, and a man's cream wool and silk damask ensemble with embroidered waistcoat by Tom Gilbey twenty years later, was only the second time that bridal wear had been chosen for the award. Boler described her choices as representative of the 1995 trend for nostalgic, period-style bridal wear.

== Personal life ==
Boler's husband was one of her colleagues from Vogue.
