= Muzik =

Former British dance music magazine

- Muzik magazine cover promoting the Chemical Brothers, April 2002
- Editor: Push (1995–1998); Ben Turner (1998–2000); Conor McNicholas (2000–2003)
- Frequency: Monthly
- First issue: June 1995
- Final issue: August 2003
- Company: IPC Media
- Country: United Kingdom
- Based in: London, England
- Language: English
- ISSN: 1358-541X

Muzik was a British dance music magazine published by IPC Media from June 1995 to August 2003. The magazine hosted an annual dance music awards.

== History ==
Muzik was created by two former Melody Maker journalists, Push and Ben Turner. Shortly after launch, Muzik won the "Title of the Year" category at the 1995 ITC annual awards. Push was the editor of Muzik from its launch until he left the magazine in 1998, at which point Turner took over as editor. The title was subsequently edited by Dave Fowler, then Chris Elwell-Sutton for less than a year, before Conor McNicholas, who went on to edit NME, took over.

Aimed at serious dance music fans rather than weekend clubbers, Muzik's writers included a number of well-known DJs, including Kris Needs, Rob da Bank, Spoony, Terry Farley, Bob Jones, Jonty Skrufff and Dave Mothersole. The magazine sold over 50,000 copies a month at its peak, but was closed down by IPC Media just one issue short of its 100th edition.

=== Muzik Magazine Dance Awards ===
Muzik magazine organised and hosted an annual dance music award ceremony. Voted for by the magazine readers, categories included record labels, artists, parties, and books. Winners have included Basement Jaxx, Fatboy Slim, Spiller, and the Chemical Brothers. In 2001, DJ Annie Nightingale won the award for "Caner of the Year" in recognition of her hard partying at age 61.
