= SS Jaguar 100 =

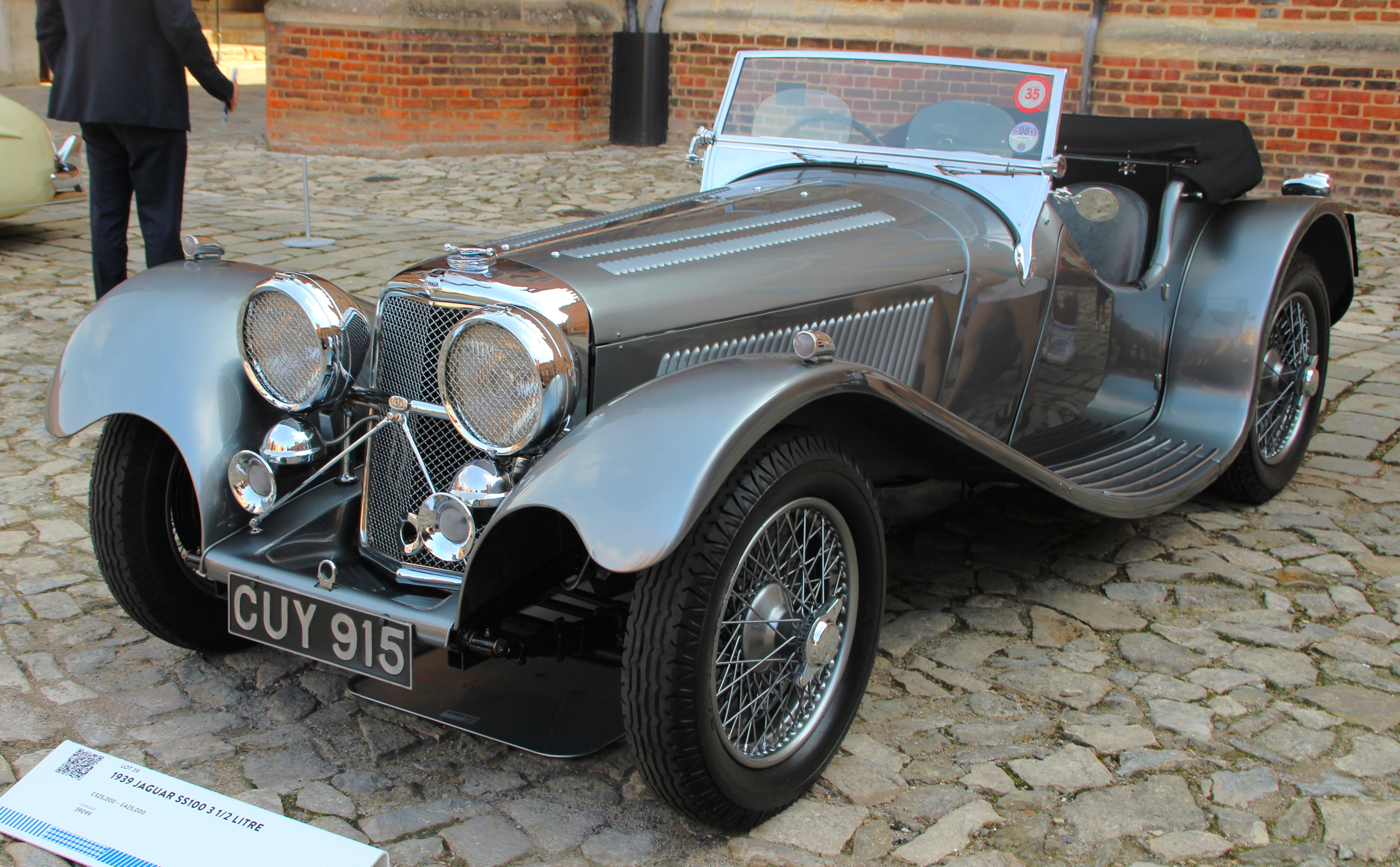
- 1939 SS Jaguar 100

Overview
- Manufacturer: SS Cars Ltd
- Also called: SS Jaguar 2½ Litre 100 Model
- Production: 1936–1939
- Assembly: United Kingdom: Coventry

Body and chassis
- Class: Sports car
- Body style: open two-seater; 2-seater fixed head coupé (one-off)

Powertrain
- Engine: 2663 cc I6 (1936–1938); 3485 cc I6 (1938–1939)
- Transmission: 4-speed manual

Dimensions
- Wheelbase: 104 in (2,642 mm)
- Length: 153 in (3,886 mm)
- Width: 63 in (1,600 mm)

Chronology
- Predecessor: SS 90
- Successor: Jaguar XK120

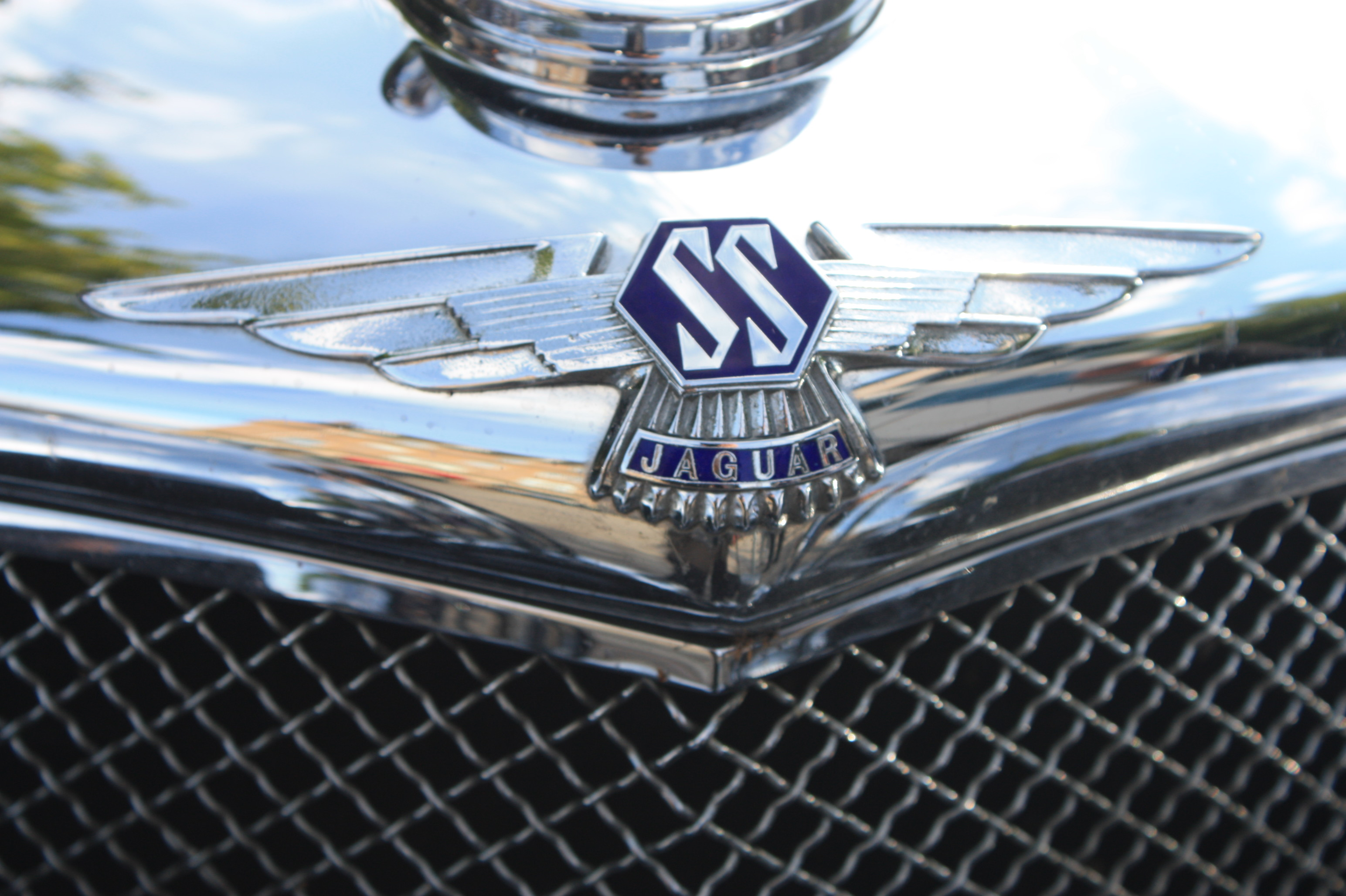
An SS Jaguar radiator badge

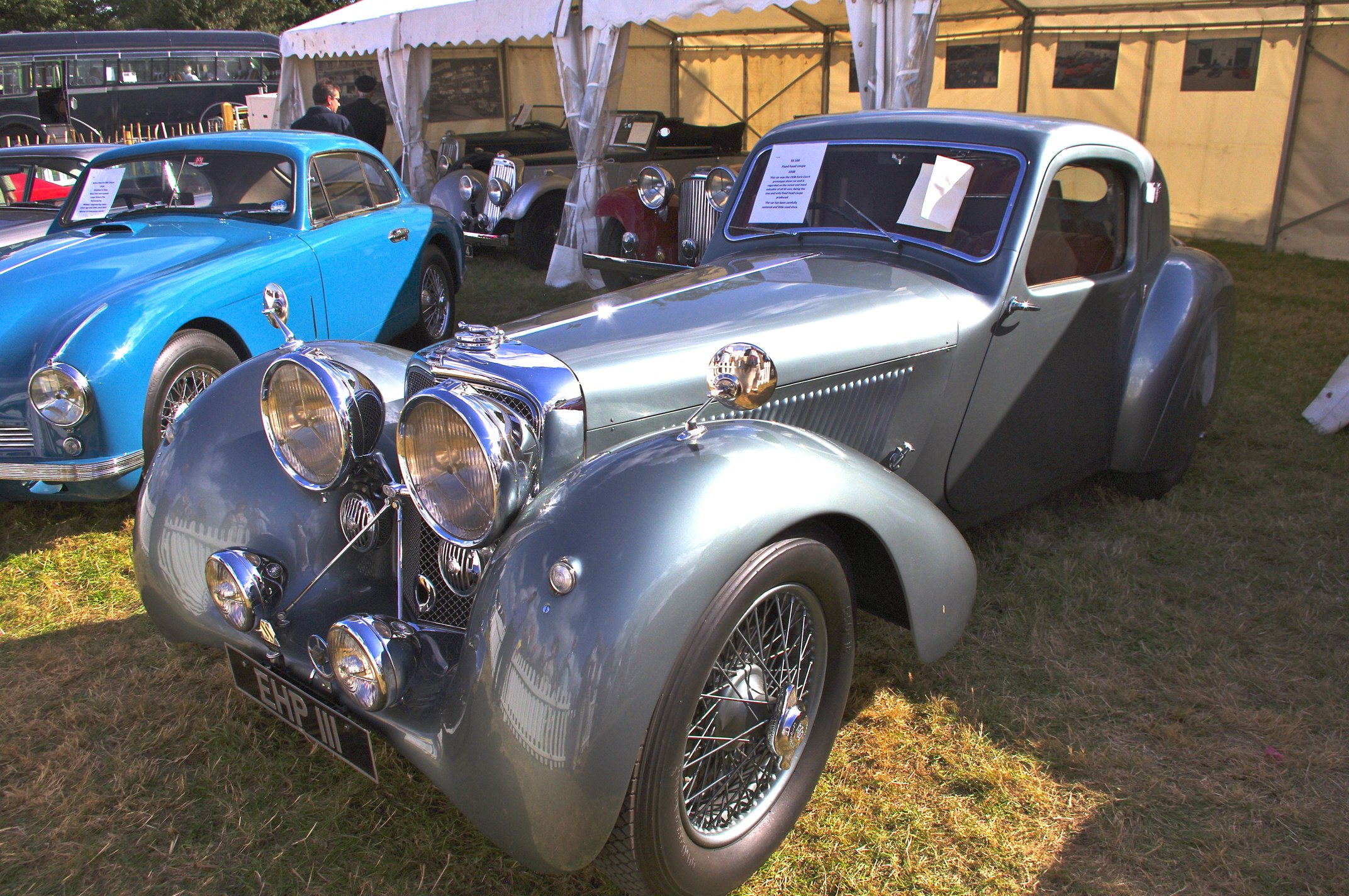
The only fixed head coupé

A publicity shot of CKV250 outside the SS Cars building in 1937. This is considered to be the first recorded use of the Jaguar 'leaper' mascot.

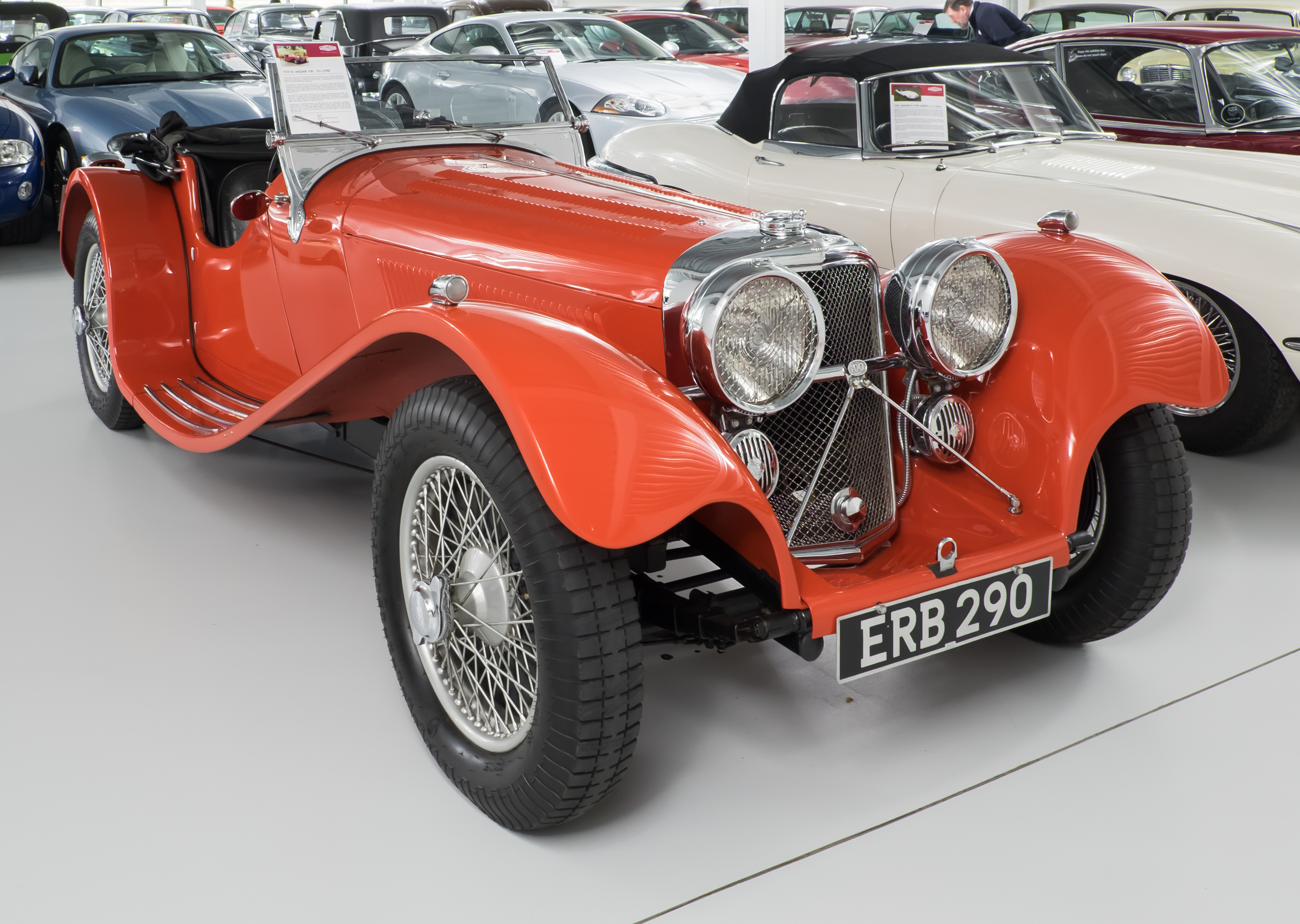
A 1938 SS Jaguar 100 - 2 1/2 Litre

The SS Jaguar 100 is a British 2-seat sports car built between 1936 and 1939 by SS Cars Ltd of Coventry, England. The manufacturer's name 'SS Cars' used from 1934 maintained a link to the previous owner, Swallow Sidecar, founded in 1922 by Walmsley and Lyons to build motorcycle sidecars. In March 1945 the S. S. Cars shareholders agreed to change the name to Jaguar Cars Limited.

In common with many products of the thirties, the adoption of an animal name was deemed appropriate and the model name "Jaguar" was given to a new SS saloon car in 1935, and then to all new SS models. The '100' was for the theoretical 100 mph maximum speed of the vehicle.

== Construction ==
The chassis had a wheelbase of 8 feet 8 inches (2.64 m), and was essentially a shortened version of the one designed for the 2½-litre saloon, a car produced in much greater numbers, and first seen in the SS 90 of 1935. When leaving the factory it was originally fitted with 5.50 or 5.25 × 18 inch tyres on 18 inch wire wheels. Suspension was on half-elliptical springs all round with rigid axles. The engine was a development of the old 2½-litre Standard pushrod unit converted from side valve to overhead valve with a new cylinder head designed by William Heynes and Harry Weslake. The power output was increased from 70 bhp (52 kW) to 100 bhp (70 kW). Twin SU carburettors were bolted directly to the cylinder head. In 1938 the engine was further enlarged to 3½ litres and the power increased to 125 bhp (93 kW). The four-speed gearbox had synchromesh on the top 3 ratios. Brakes were by Girling. The complete car weighed just over 23 cwt (2600 pounds, 1150 kg).

On test by Autocar magazine in 1937 the 2½-litre (20 RAC hp rating) car was found, with the windscreen lowered, to have a maximum speed of 95 mph (153 km/h) and a 0–60 mph (97 km/h) time of 13.5 seconds. With the 3½-litre (25 RAC hp rating) the top speed reached 100 mph (160 km/h) with a best of 101 mph (163 km/h) over the quarter mile and the 0–60 mph (97 km/h) coming down to 10.4 seconds.

In 1937 the 2½-litre car cost £395 and in 1938 the 3½-litre £445. The fixed head coupé, of which only one was made, was listed at £595. A few examples were supplied as chassis-only to external coachbuilders.

== Legacy ==
The SS100 is considered rare with only 198 2½-litre and 116 3½-litre models made. While most stayed in the home market, 49 were exported. Cars in good condition will now regularly fetch in excess of £300,000. A near concours example was auctioned by Bonhams at the 2007 Goodwood Festival of Speed for £199,500. Due largely to its rarity, auction prices for the SS100 have since risen strongly.

More recently a restored former Pebble Beach concours winning 1937 S.S. Jaguar 100 3½ Litre Roadster - was sold by Gooding & Co. at their August 2010 Pebble Beach auction. It fetched £666,270 ($1,045,000).

It was on an SS100 that the famous Jaguar 'leaper', the marque's signature feline bonnet mascot, was first displayed. In mid 1936 the first version of the Jaguar mascot was reputedly described by Sir William Lyons, founder of the company, as "looking like a cat shot off a fence". A later publicity photograph of the new Model 100 "Jaguar" (registration mark CKV 250) parked outside the offices of SS Cars Ltd in early 1937 shows a revised Jaguar 'leaper' mounted on the radiator cap. It is this more stylised 'leaper' that became the trade mark for Jaguar Cars, Ltd., remaining in use to this day. The CKV 250 car was ordered as a gift for the 16th anniversary birthday of young king Mihai the 1st of Romania. As a car enthusiast, he declared that this was his favorite car and drove it consistently until he left power and fled Romania forced by the communists forces.

The late Alan Clark (1928–1999) MP owned an SS Jaguar 100, and during his time in Margaret Thatcher's government was often to be seen piloting his SS100 away from the House of Commons after late Parliamentary sittings.

Of the 49 exported models, one notable example, CNP 947, was driven and raced by pioneering American television host Dave Garroway. His white 3 1/2 Litre car still bears the alligator hide trim on its instrument panel, seat surfaces and steering wheel from his ownership. Jaguar Motorcars provided Garroway the first XK 3.8 litre engine sold privately, a race prepared unit which remains with the car. At Gooding's January 2017 auction in Scottsdale, Arizona, the Garroway SS100, with both the XK engine and a correct 3 1/2 litre Standard engine, sold for £493,000.

== Replicas and recreations ==
A number of Jaguar SS100 replicas and recreations of varying material quality and execution have been manufactured since the 1960s. Significant makers include the Birchfield Motor Company, the Steadman Motor Company, Suffolk Sportscars and the Finch Motor Company. In recent years, even these replicas regularly bring in excess of £50,000.

Comparison of SS100 replicas and recreations
	Birchfield Sports	Steadman TS100	Suffolk SS100	Finch SS100
Production Years	1982–2004	late 1980s to late 1990s	1990–2020	1992–present
Chassis	In-house design to suit donor XJ6	In-house design to suit donor XJ6	In-house design to suit donor XJ6	Original 1939 SS100 design
Body	Alloy cladding on steel-tube frame	Alloy cladding on steel-tube frame	Glass-reinforced plastic (GRP)	Alloy cladding on timber frame
Engine	XK 4.2-litre	XK 2.8, 3.8 or 4.2 litre	XJ6 3.4 or 4.2 litre	Mk IV or SS 2½ or 3½ litre
Gearbox	XJ6 automatic gearbox	4 speed manual or 3 speed automatic XJ6	4 or 5 speed manual XJ6 Short Compact Box	4 speed manual Moss Box

=== Birchfield Motor Company ===
In 1982, the first Birchfield Sports was produced but it was only intended to be a one-off. A company called Shapecraft in Northampton, UK, then developed the concept further as a (small) production-run vehicle using Jaguar XJ6 mechanicals, with the looks of the SS Jaguar.

Due to the complexity of the design, and the advanced degree of engineering knowledge needed to deal with the Jaguar parts, the car was not very successful as a kit car. For this reason, only 18 were ever produced in the UK.

After production ceased in the UK, a Shapecraft employee emigrated to Australia taking with him the Birchfield drawings and the last production car (#18) to use as a pattern. By 2004, at least two cars had been completed in Australia and two more were in production.

=== Steadman Motor Company ===
The Steadman TS100 manufactured during the late 1980s and early 1990s by Ottercraft Ltd in Hayle, Cornwall, United Kingdom, is described as a 'reproduction' of the SS100.

The actual build numbers for this car are unknown, but it is thought that a maximum of twenty-eight of these vehicles were assembled, and were also referred to as the Jaguar Steadman TS100. The Steadman TS100 was never intended to be a replica of the SS100 of the 1930s, but was designed to be a sports car in its own right.

With a hand-built aluminium body, the Steadman TS100 used unadapted Jaguar XJ6 running gear and was sold as a high quality, more modern version of the SS Jaguar 100. Dimensionally and visually, the Steadman TS100 was quite different from the original SS Jaguar 100. These differences occurred because the manufacturers were forced to change the original proportions to both accommodate the wider track of the donor car and allow the use of more readily available smaller, wider wheels. Attention was paid to styling detail during design (such as the use of appropriately large headlights) and at the time of production, the Steadman TS100 was regarded as more successful than most other evocations. With an unknown number surviving, this re-creation is a rare sight at classic car events.

The Steadman TS100 Enthusiasts Club was established in 2011 to maintain the vehicle's marque and to bring together owners from around the world.

=== Suffolk Sportscars ===
Suffolk Sportscars were based in Woodbridge, Suffolk, United Kingdom and built glass-reinforced plastic (GRP) SS100 replicas. Upon receiving an order, the replica car was built individually by hand to the customer's own specifications. Alternatively, a replica could be ordered in component form for skilled home assembly.

The Suffolk SS100 used the Jaguar XK6 engine, and commonly the 4-speed Jaguar 'Short Compact' gearbox as the drivetrain. Some examples of the Suffolk were built with automatic transmissions, 5-speed gearboxes or in LHD. The company were even able to offer further modern comforts such as electric power steering and air conditioning.

The Suffolk Sportscars SS100 was probably the most prolific replica of the SS Jaguar 100. As of 2017, Suffolk Sportscars Ltd. report that they have built over 315 examples of their Suffolk SS100, therefore outproducing the original SS100s production run of 314 vehicles.

However, Suffolk Sportscars went into liquidation in 2020.

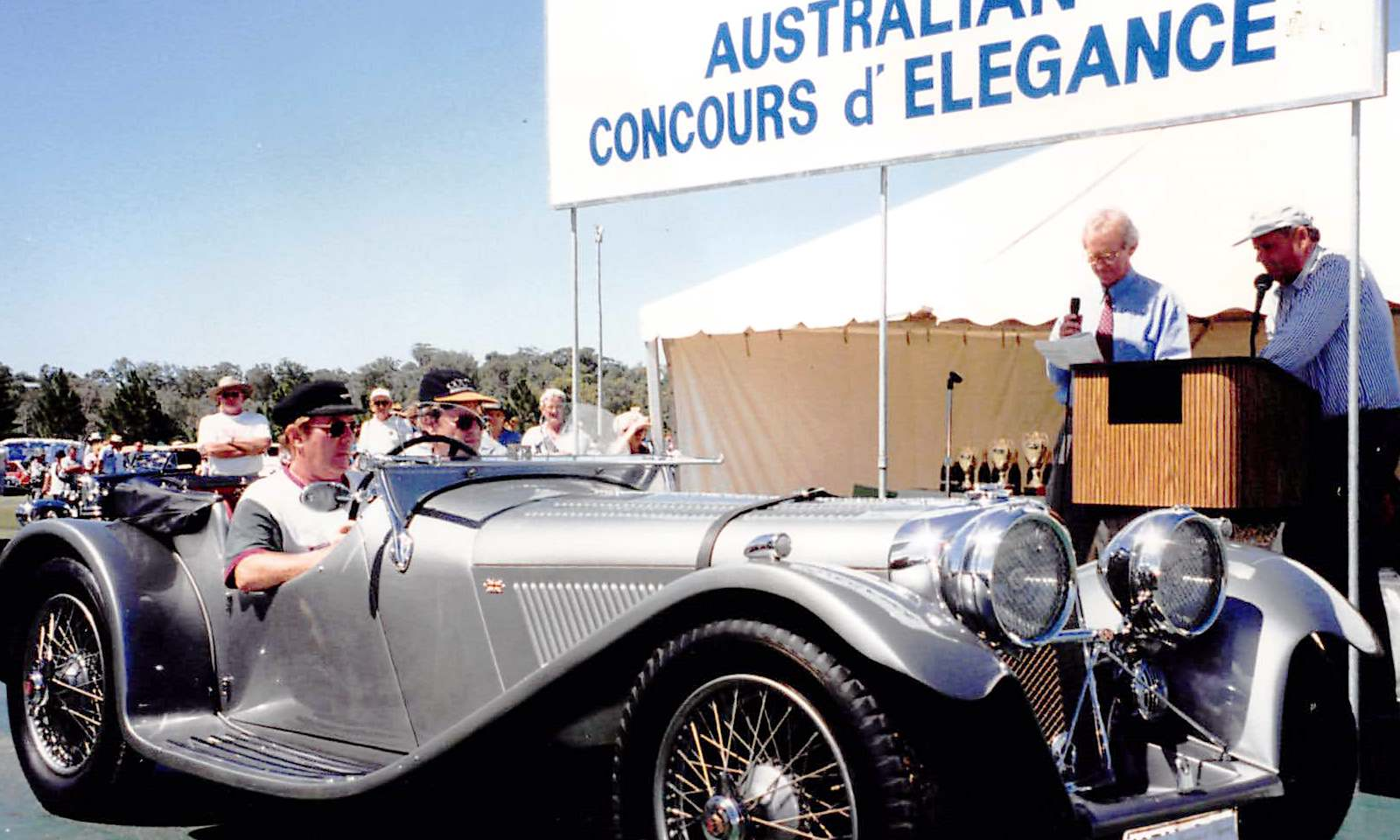
A Finch SS100 winning the Australian Concours d' Elegance (Gold Coast)

=== Finch Motor Company ===
The Finch Motor Company is based in Mount Barker, South Australia.

Finch's approach to the Finch SS100 is somewhat different from the other SS100 replica manufacturers. Finch endeavoured to recreate their Finch SS100 as faithfully as possible and do not use the XJ6 as the base donor car. Finch sourced original factory drawings and build their SS100 chassis to the original design. The bodies of the Finch SS100 are made from aluminium-shaped to fit the traditional wooden frames built by Finch. Finch SS100 mechanicals are sourced from 'deceased' MkIV and SS Jaguars to obtain contemporary components.

A Finch SS100 won the Australian Concours d' Elegance.
