= Evidence Based Birth =

Pregnancy and childbirth information source

- Website type: Pregnancy and childbirth resource
- Available in: English
- Founded: 2012
- Headquarters: United States
- Owner: Rebecca Dekker
- Website: evidencebasedbirth.com
- Registration: Optional
- Current status: Online

Evidence Based Birth is an online pregnancy and childbirth resource. It was founded in 2012 by nurse Rebecca Dekker.

== History ==
According to The Cut, the organization also "trains thousands of pregnancy and childbirth professionals."

The website was used as a resource in Microbia: A Journey into the Unseen World Around You.

== Reception ==
In 2020, Brides magazine ranked Evidence Based Birth one of the "6 websites every pregnant women should know about."
