= David McKendrick =

British art director and graphic designer

David McKendrick is a British art director and graphic designer. He is the founder of David McKendrick Studio and founder and editor of Paperboy Magazine.

In 2021 McKendrick founded and launched Paperboy Magazine. The magazine features a combination of accomplished, world renowned writers, photographers and artists as well as high school kids and undergraduates.

Prior to starting David McKendrick Studio, he founded BAM, a London-based creative agency, with business partner and fellow art director Lee Belcher in 2014.

Previously, David was the creative director at British Esquire, where he won Best Magazine Design at the Magazine Design & Journalism Awards in 2007 for Esquire's relaunch. He was also named the Periodical Publishers Association's Designer of the Year in 2008 and the British Society of Magazine Editors' Art Director of the Year in 2009.

McKendrick was made an honorary Doctor of Design at Southampton Solent University in 2015. He is also a visiting lecturer and guest tutor at Southampton Solent University, Glasgow School of Art, Bath School of Art and Design and Nottingham Trent University.

He was born in Clydebank, Scotland and graduated from the Glasgow School of Art in 2000.
