= Sarah Hedley =

Editor and columnist

Sarah Hedley is a British editor and columnist.

== Career ==
She began her career at Maxim and was a columnist and editor for several men's lifestyle magazines in the UK. She was later commissioned by The Sun to write a weekly column, and also worked for Cosmopolitan UK, Men's Fitness US, and Scarlet. As editor she was nominated for the British Society of Magazine Editors' New Editor of the Year Award.

On screen, Hedley has appeared as a social commentator on television shows including Richard & Judy, The Oprah Winfrey Show and the BBC News, and was selected by Time Out as a contributor to the book 1000 Books to Change Your Life with the novelists Ali Smith, Jonathan Coe, Jonathan Franzen, and Maggie O'Farrell.

== Selected works ==
- Time Out 1000 Books That Will Change Your Life (2007) - Contributing author
