= Emma Hope =

British shoe designer (born 1962)

- Born: Emma Mary Constance Hope; July 1962 (age 63); Portsmouth, England
- Education: Sevenoaks School
- Alma mater: Cordwainers College
- Occupation: shoe designer

Emma Mary Constance Hope MBE (born July 1962) is a British shoe designer.

== Early life ==
Emma Hope was born in July 1962 in Portsmouth. Her father, who died in 2005, was a Captain in the Royal Navy, and her mother is a former fashion journalist. They lived in Singapore until she was five.

She was educated at Sevenoaks School, and Cordwainers College, London. When Hope graduated, Harper's and Queen named her alongside John Galliano as someone to be aware of.

== Career ==
Hope started out designing shoes for Laura Ashley, Betty Jackson and Jean Muir. Her first shop was opened in Islington in 1985. In 2002, she designed shoes for Paul Smith, and opened two more shops in London, in Sloane Square and Notting Hill.

Hope's 1988 shoes featuring embroidered depictions of the dancer Josephine Baker were exhibited by the Victoria and Albert Museum in 1990 as an example of the work of "one of Britain's leading young shoe designers." In 1995, Sandra Boler, editor of Brides magazine, chose a pair of Emma Hope shoes to accompany the Catherine Rayner bridal gown selected to represent 1995 in the Dress of the Year collection at the Fashion Museum, Bath.

== Personal life ==
Hope goes "hunting every weekend during the season" and is a keen surfer.
