= Catherine Rayner (designer) =

British fashion designer

Catherine Rayner was a British fashion designer who specialized in wedding dresses. Rayner's designs were retailed through her boutique and through London department stores such as Dickins & Jones.

In 1995, one of her bead-embroidered satin gowns was chosen by Sandra Boler, the editor of Brides magazine, (along with shoes by Emma Hope and a bridegroom's outfit by Tom Gilbey) to represent 1995's Dress of the Year in the Fashion Museum, Bath's collection. At the time, Boler described her choice as representing that year's nostalgic and period-costume-influenced trends.

In 1999, The Independent noted her designs as having "classic elegance and romantic flair," stylized by fitted bodices and flattering cuts.

Another of Rayner's designs, a pale pink strapless dress, was included in the Victoria and Albert Museum's fashion collection, featured on the poster for its Wedding Dress exhibition in 2014.
