= British Society of Magazine Editors =

Industry body

The British Society of Magazine Editors (BSME) is a professional association of print and online magazine editors in the United Kingdom. Established in 1981, as of 2016 the BSME has 148 members. Its annual awards—the BSME Awards and the BSME Talent Awards—are highly regarded in the British magazine industry.

== Chairs of the BSME ==
- 2024 - Gideon Spanier (Global Head of Media, Campaign)
- 2023 - Deborah Joseph (European editorial director, GLAMOUR UK)
- 2022 - Tim Pollard (Digital Editorial Director, Bauer Automotive and Specialist)
- 2021 - Hattie Brett (Editor, Grazia)
- 2020 - Maria Piera (National Geographic Traveller, National Geographic Traveller)
- 2018/19 – Alex Mead (Content Director, Eric)
- 2017 – Catherine Westwood (Editorial Director, Time Inc. UK)
- 2016 – Claire Irvin (Editorial Content Director, The River Group)
- 2015 – Dickon Ross (Editor-in-Chief, E&T)
- 2015 – Sally Eyden (Editor, Now)
- 2014 – Guy Woodward (Editor, Food & Travel; Associate Editor, Harrods Publishing)
- 2013 – Diane Kenwood (Editor, Woman's Weekly)
- 2012 – Kitty Finstad (Group Editor, August Media)
- 2011 – Lisa Smosarski (Editor, Stylist)
- 2010 – Juliet Warkentin (Content Director, WGSN)
- 2009 – Conor McNicholas (Editor, Top Gear Magazine)
- 2008 – Jane Johnson (Editorial Director, Fabulous; Deputy Editor, News of the World)
- 2007 – Jane Bruton (Editor, Grazia)
- 2006 – Celia Duncan (Editor, CosmoGIRL!)
- 2005 – Dylan Jones (Editor, GQ)
- 2004 – Sue Peart (Editor, YOU Magazine)
- 2003 – Rachel Shattock (Editor-in-Chief, John Brown Citrus Publishing)
- 2002 – Sarah Miller (Editor, Condé Nast Traveller)
- 2001 – Orlando Murrin (Editor, BBC Good Food)
- 2000 – Fiona McIntosh (Editor, Elle)
- 1999 – Ian Birch (Editor-in-Chief, Emap Elan)
- 1998 – Sharon Ring (Emap Elan; Former Editor, OK! Magazine)
- 1997 – Lindsay Nicholson (Editor, Prima)
- 1996 – David Durman (Editor-in-Chief, Woman/Woman's Own/Chat/Now)
- 1995 – Rosie Boycott (Editor, Esquire)
- 1994 – Sandra Boler (Editor, Brides and Setting up Home)
- 1993 – Gill Hudson (Editor, New Woman)
- 1992 – Nicholas Brett (Editor, Radio Times)
- 1991 – Francine Lawrence (Editor, Country Living)
- 1990 – Jo Foley (Editor, Options)
- 1989 – Russell Twisk (Editor-in-Chief, Reader's Digest)
- 1988 – Dee Nolan (Editor, Sunday Express Magazine)
- 1987 – Linda Kelsey (Editor, Cosmopolitan)
- 1986 – Michael Clayton (Horse & Hound)
- 1985 – Richard Barber (Woman)
- 1984 – Bridget Rowe (Sunday)
- 1983 – Anthony Peagam (TV Times)
- 1982 – Maggie Goodman (Company)
- 1981 – Ray Hutton (Autocar)
- 1980 – Patience Bulkely (Slimming Magazine)
- 1979 – Jill Churchill (Home & Freezer Digest)
