= Mike Williams (journalist) =

British journalist, born 1979

- Born: Michael John Williams; Wrexham, Wales, United Kingdom
- Occupations: Journalist and editor
- Years active: 2003 to present
- Notable work: Kruger, NME, Time Out, Sight and Sound

Mike Williams (born 4 February 1979) is a British journalist and editor, currently editor in chief of Sight and Sound. Williams was previously the editor in chief of the NME, which became a free title under his leadership before ceasing publication in print just weeks after his departure.

== Career ==
Williams studied film and television at University of Wales, Aberystwyth, before moving to Cardiff and launching the independent music magazine Kruger in 2003. Kruger was a mix of music reviews, interviews and features about music and culture. It closed in April 2010.

Williams joined NME as features editor in September 2010, was promoted to deputy editor in July 2011, and replaced Krissi Murison as editor in June 2012.

While Williams was editor, the NME responded to a continuing fall in readers by removing its cover price and becoming a free publication, "hoping that a boost in ads and sponsorship, both online and in print, can make up for the loss of cover price income".

With thousands of copies given out for free at train stations, universities and businesses throughout the UK, the NME went on to hit its highest ever circulation at 307,217.

In the end, it was not enough to save the print product which would soon cease publication, but not before Williams had been named Editor Of The Year at the BSME Awards 2016 with the judges saying that the NME had "bounced back from an uncertain future and established itself confidently and creatively in a new market."

During the general election of 2017, Williams interviewed Jeremy Corbyn. It was suggested that this helped engaged young people in the election, which resulted in a minority Conservative government.

The following year, on 26 February 2018, Williams stepped down from his position claiming "I leave in the knowledge that NME matters again, that it sets the agenda again, and that it's doing exactly what it always should again: turning the young people of Britain onto the music that's going to change their lives."

Just weeks later, on 7 March 2018, it was announced that the NME was to cease publication in print after 66 years, as the magazine was "no longer financially viable," instead becoming an online only publication". The move was met with dismay by many within the music industry, with Kasabian saying it was "a truly sad day that such an icon is no more".

The following year, Williams joined Time Out as Interim Editor. In July 2019 it was announced that Williams would become the new Editor in Chief of Sight and Sound magazine.

Following a successful redesign of the magazine in 2021, Williams was named Editor of the Year by The British Society of Magazine Editors three years in a row, in 2022, 2023 and 2024.

In 2022, Williams led on Sight and Sound's "Greatest Films of All Time" poll, telling The New York Times that surprise winner Jeanne Dielman's triumph was as a result of “Our list is becoming more reflective of the wider world of film-making, enjoyment, criticism and conversation.”

== Stormzy controversy ==
In March 2017, the NME, then edited by Williams, used a photograph of British rapper, singer and songwriter Stormzy on its frontpage along with the headline, "Depression: It's time to talk".

Stormzy responded on Twitter saying, "You lot know I don't rant or open my mouth up for no reason but serious @NME magazine are the biggest bunch of sly, foul PAIGONS" and "using my face as a poster boy for it to sell your magazine is so foul and below the belt I will never respect you lot." He also said, "You lot are a bunch of real life fucking pussyholes. Proper dickheads” and claimed that the NME had been "begging" him to be on the cover but he had "refused".

According to The Guardian, "the phrasing of the NME cover created the impression the magazine had interviewed him, which it had not". A feature in the magazine instead used quotes from Stormzy taken from a different interview.

Andrew Trendell, the journalist who wrote the feature, said he "had absolutely no part in the cover itself, the photos used nor the cover lines."

However, responding to Stormzy via the NME's official Twitter account, Williams said, “I'm really sorry this has happened. We're a free magazine and were not trying to shift copies, just talk about something important.”

Stormzy replied saying, "DEAD. You're NOT a non-profit organisation. The more copies you dish out the more you charge for advertising. You will make money from this".

While Perez Hilton, founder of the Perez Hilton website, interjected to tell Williams, "this response is wack!!"

Stormzy later referenced the incident on the song "One Second" from his album Heavy is the Head saying, "The cover of the NME, that shit made me resent myself. There's people tryin' to spread the word and people that pretend to help."

== Awards ==
- Editor of the Year (Record of the Day Music Journalism and PR Awards, November 2009)
- Editor of the Year (British Society of Magazine Editors' Awards, 2016)
- Editor of the Year (British Society of Magazine Editors' Awards, 2022)
- Editor of the Year (British Society of Magazine Editors' Awards, 2023)
- Editor of the Year (British Society of Magazine Editors' Awards, 2024)

Media offices
Preceded by Krissi Murison	Editor of the NME; 2012–2018	Succeeded by Charlotte Gunn
