= Krissi Murison =

British journalist

Krissi Murison (born 1981) is a British journalist. She is the deputy editor of The Sunday Times and the former editor of the NME.

Murison attended The Abbey School in Reading from 1993–2000, before studying English literature at Bristol University, where she edited the music pages of student newspaper Epigram. Murison joined the NME in 2003 as a staff writer. In July 2009, she became the first female editor of the NME. The Guardian reported in February 2012 that there is "a widespread consensus [...] that Murison has done a decent job since taking over in July 2009." Previously she worked for Nylon magazine in New York as music director.

On 12 April 2012 it was announced that Murison would be leaving NME to join The Sunday Times Magazine as Features Editor. She became Editor of the magazine in 2019.

On 19 January 2023 it was announced that Murison was appointed The Sunday Times deputy editor.

Media offices
Preceded by Conor McNicholas	Editor of the NME; 2009–2012	Succeeded by Mike Williams
