= NME =

British music, film, gaming and culture website

New Musical Express

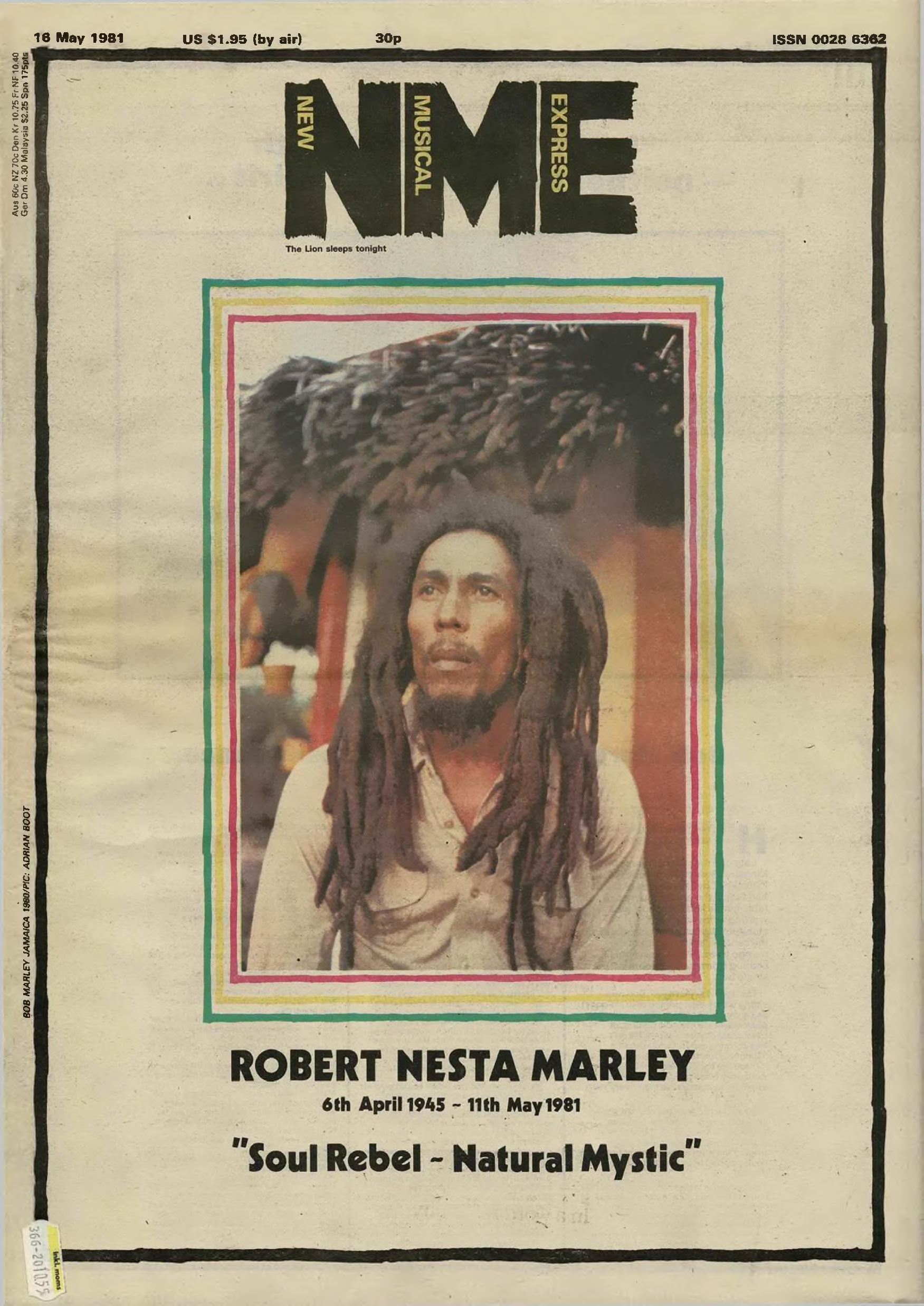
- Issue from 16 May 1981 commemorating Bob Marley
- Categories: Music and pop culture media
- Frequency: Weekly (1952–2018); Bimonthly (2023–present)
- Founder: Theodore Ingham
- First issue: 7 March 1952
- Company: NME Networks
- Country: United Kingdom
- Based in: London, England
- Language: English
- Website: www.nme.com
- ISSN: 0028-6362
- OCLC: 60624023

New Musical Express (NME) is a British music, film, gaming and culture website, and bimonthly magazine. Founded as a newspaper in 1952, with the publication being referred to as a "rock inkie", the NME would become a magazine that ended up as a free publication as well as a webzine, and the brand has also been used for their NME Awards show, the NME Tours and the former NME Radio station.

As a "rock inkie", NME was the first British newspaper to include a singles chart, adding that feature in the edition of 14 November 1952. In the 1970s, it became the best-selling British music newspaper. It became closely associated with punk rock through the writings of Julie Burchill, Paul Morley, and Tony Parsons. It started as a music newspaper, and gradually moved toward a magazine format during the 1980s and 1990s, changing from newsprint in 1998.

The magazine's website NME.com was launched in 1996, and became Britain's most popular commercial music site on the web, and had 1.6 million users worldwide in 2006. With newsstand sales falling across the UK magazine sector in the early 21st century, the NME magazine was relaunched in 2015 to be distributed nationally as a free publication. The first average circulation published in February 2016 of 307,217 copies per week was the highest in NME's history, beating the previous best of 306,881, recorded in 1964 at the height of the Beatles' fame. However, in March 2018, the publisher announced that the print edition of NME would cease publication after 66 years and become an online-only publication. In July 2023, the print edition of NME was revived, now as a bimonthly release.

NME was acquired in 2019 by Singaporean music company BandLab Technologies, which put all of its music publications under the NME Networks brand in December 2021, when the company was restructured.

== History ==
The paper was established in 1952. The Accordion Times and Musical Express was bought by London music promoter Maurice Kinn for £1,000, just 15 minutes before it was due to be officially closed. It was relaunched as the New Musical Express, and was initially published in a non-glossy tabloid format on standard newsprint. Under the editorship of Ray Sonin, the paper began publishing artist interviews, industry gossip and, on 14 November 1952, taking its cue from the US magazine Billboard, it created the first UK Singles Chart, a list of the Top Twelve best-selling singles. Sales of the magazine jumped by 50%. The first of these singles charts was, in contrast to more recent charts, a top twelve sourced by the magazine itself from sales in regional stores around the UK. The first number one was "Here in My Heart" by Al Martino.

=== 1960s ===
During the 1960s, the paper championed the new British groups emerging at the time. The NME circulation peaked under Andy Gray (editor 1957–1972) with a figure of 306,881 for the period from January to June 1964. The Beatles and the Rolling Stones were frequently featured on the front cover. These and other artists also appeared at the NME Poll Winners' Concert, an awards event that featured artists voted as most popular by the paper's readers. The concert also featured a ceremony where the poll winners would collect their awards. The NME Poll Winners' Concerts took place between 1959 and 1972. From 1964 onwards, they were filmed, edited, and transmitted on British television a few weeks after they had taken place.

In the mid-1960s, the NME was primarily dedicated to pop while its older rival, Melody Maker, was known for its more serious coverage of music. Other competing titles included Record Mirror, which led the way in championing American rhythm and blues, and Disc, which focused on chart news. The latter part of the decade the paper charted the rise of psychedelia and the continued dominance of British groups of the time. During this period some sections of pop music began to be designated as rock. The paper became engaged in a sometimes tense rivalry with Melody Maker; however, NME sales were healthy, with the paper selling as many as 200,000 issues per week, making it one of the UK's biggest sellers at the time.

=== 1970s ===
Cover featuring Patti Smith for the week of 21 February 1976

By the early 1970s, NME had lost ground to Melody Maker, as its coverage of music had failed to keep pace with the development of rock music, particularly during the early years of psychedelia and progressive rock. In early 1972, the paper was on the verge of closure by its owner IPC (which had bought the paper from Kinn in 1963). According to Nick Kent (soon to play a prominent part in the paper's revival):

After sales had plummeted to 60,000 and a review of guitar instrumentalist Duane Eddy had been printed which began with the words "On this, his 35th album, we find Duane in as good voice as ever," the NME had been told to rethink its policies or die on the vine.

Alan Smith was made editor in 1972, and was told by IPC to turn things around quickly or face closure. To achieve this, Smith and his assistant editor Nick Logan raided the underground press for writers such as Charles Shaar Murray and Nick Kent, and recruited other writers such as Tony Tyler, Ian MacDonald and Californian Danny Holloway. According to The Economist, the New Musical Express "started to champion underground, up-and-coming music....NME became the gateway to a more rebellious world. First came glamrock, and bands such as T. Rex, and then came punk....by 1977 it had become the place to keep in touch with a cultural revolution that was enthralling the nation's listless youth. Bands such as Sex Pistols, X-Ray Spex and Generation X were regular cover stars, eulogised by writers such as Julie Burchill and Tony Parsons, whose nihilistic tone narrated the punk years perfectly." By the time Smith handed the editor's chair to Logan in mid-1973, the paper was selling nearly 300,000 copies per week and was outstripping Melody Maker, Disc, Record Mirror and Sounds.

According to MacDonald:

I think all the other papers knew by 1974 that NME had become the best music paper in Britain. We had most of the best writers and photographers, the best layouts, that sense of style of humour and a feeling of real adventure. We also set out to beat Melody Maker on its strong suit: being the serious, responsible journal of record. We did Looking Back and Consumer Guide features that beat the competition out of sight, and we did this not just to surpass our rivals but because we reckoned that rock had finished its first wind around 1969/70 and deserved to be treated as history, as a canon of work. We wanted to see where we'd got to, sort out this huge amount of stuff that had poured out since the mid '60s. Everyone on the paper was into this.

Led Zeppelin topped the "NME Pop Poll" for three consecutive years (1974–76) under the category of the best "Vocal Group".

In 1976, NME lambasted German pioneer electronic band Kraftwerk with this title: "This is what your fathers fought to save you from ..." The article said that the "electronic melodies flowed as slowly as a piece of garbage floating down the polluted Rhine". The same year also saw punk rock arrive on what some people perceived to be a stagnant music scene. The NME gave the Sex Pistols their first music press coverage in a live review of their performance at the Marquee in February that year, but overall it was slow to cover this new phenomenon in comparison to Sounds and Melody Maker, where Jonh Ingham and Caroline Coon respectively were early champions of punk. Although articles by the likes of Mick Farren (whose article "The Titanic Sails at Dawn" called for a new street-led rock movement in response to stadium rock) were published by the NME that summer, it was felt that younger writing was needed to credibly cover the emerging punk movement, and the paper advertised for a pair of "hip young gunslingers" to join their editorial staff. This resulted in the recruitment of Tony Parsons and Julie Burchill. The pair rapidly became champions of the punk scene and created a new tone for the paper. Parsons' time at NME is reflected in his 2005 novel Stories We Could Tell, about the misadventures of three young music-paper journalists on the night of 16 August 1977 – the night Elvis Presley died.

The logo that has been used with slight variation since 1978

In 1978, Logan moved on, and his deputy Neil Spencer was made editor. One of his earliest tasks was to oversee a redesign of the paper by Barney Bubbles, which included the logo still used on the paper's masthead today (albeit in a modified form) – this made its first appearance towards the end of 1978. Spencer's time as editor also coincided with the emergence of post-punk acts such as Joy Division and Gang of Four. This development was reflected in the writing of Ian Penman and Paul Morley. Danny Baker, who began as an NME writer around this time, had a more straightforward and populist style.

The paper also became more openly political during the time of punk. Its cover would sometimes feature youth-orientated issues rather than a musical act. It took an editorial stance against political parties like the National Front. With the election of Margaret Thatcher in 1979, the paper took a broadly socialist stance for much of the following decade.

=== 1980s ===
In the 1980s, the NME became the most important music paper in the country. It released the influential C81 in 1981, in conjunction with Rough Trade Records, available to readers by mail order at a low price. The tape featured many then up-and-coming bands, including Aztec Camera, Orange Juice, Linx, and Scritti Politti, as well as many more established artists such as Robert Wyatt, Pere Ubu, the Buzzcocks and Ian Dury. A second tape titled C86 was released in 1986. From 1981 to 1988 the magazine released 36 cassette compilations.

The NME responded to the Thatcher era by espousing socialism through movements such as Red Wedge. In the week of the 1987 election, the paper featured an interview with the leader of the Labour Party, Neil Kinnock, who appeared on the paper's cover. He had appeared on the cover once two years before, in April 1985.

Writers at this time included Mat Snow, Chris Bohn (known in his later years at the paper as 'Biba Kopf'), Antonella Gambotto-Burke (known by her pseudonyms Antonella Black and, because of her then-dyed orange hair, Ginger Meggs), Barney Hoskyns, Paolo Hewitt, Don Watson, Danny Kelly, Steven Wells, and David Quantick.

However, sales were dropping, and by the mid-1980s, NME had hit a rough patch and was in danger of closing. During this period (now under the editorship of Ian Pye, who replaced Neil Spencer in 1985), they were split between those who wanted to write about hip-hop, a genre that was relatively new to the UK, and those who wanted to stick to rock music. Sales were apparently lower when photos of hip-hop artists appeared on the front and this led to the paper suffering as the lack of direction became even more apparent to readers. Many features entirely unrelated to music appeared on the cover in this era, including a piece by William Leith on computer crime and articles by Stuart Cosgrove on such subjects as the politics of sport and the presence of American troops in Britain, with Elvis Presley appearing on the cover not for musical reasons but as a political symbol.

The NME was generally thought to be rudderless at this time, with staff pulling simultaneously in many directions in what came to be known as the "hip-hop wars". It was haemorrhaging readers who were deserting NME in favour of Nick Logan's two creations The Face and Smash Hits. This was brought to a head when the paper was about to publish a poster of an insert contained in the Dead Kennedys' album Frankenchrist, consisting of a painting by H.R. Giger called Penis Landscape, then a subject of an obscenity lawsuit in the US. In the summer and autumn of 1987, three senior editorial staff were sacked, including Pye, media editor Stuart Cosgrove, and art editor Joe Ewart. Former Sounds editor Alan Lewis was brought in to rescue the paper, mirroring Alan Smith's revival a decade and a half before.

Some commented at this time that the NME had become less intellectual in its writing style and less inventive musically. Initially, NME writers themselves were ill at ease with the new regime, with most signing a letter of no confidence in Lewis shortly after he took over. However, this new direction for the NME proved to be a commercial success and the paper brought in new writers such as Andrew Collins, Andrew Harrison, Stuart Maconie, Mary Anne Hobbs and Steve Lamacq to give it a stronger identity and sense of direction. Lewis prioritised readership over editorial independence, and Mark Sinker left in 1988 after Lewis refused to print his unfavourable review of U2's Rattle and Hum ("the worst album by a major band in years"), replacing it with a glowing Stuart Baillie review intended to be more acceptable to readers. Initially many of the bands on the C86 tape were championed as well as the rise of gothic rock bands but new bands such as the Happy Mondays and the Stone Roses were coming out of Manchester. One scene during these years was acid house, which spawned "Madchester" and helped to give the paper a new lease of life. By the end of the decade, Danny Kelly had replaced Lewis as editor.

=== 1990s ===
Blur vs Oasis, August 1995. NME started 1990 in the thick of the Madchester scene, covering the new British indie bands and shoegazers.

Björk, April 1995. The magazine heavily championed Björk's breakthrough in the 1990s.

By the end of 1990, the Madchester scene was dying off, and NME had started to report on new bands coming from the US, mainly from Seattle. These bands would form a new movement called grunge, and by far the most popular bands were Nirvana and Pearl Jam. The NME took to grunge very slowly ("Sounds" was the first British music paper to write about grunge with John Robb being the first to interview Nirvana. Melody Maker was more enthusiastic early on, largely through the efforts of Everett True, who had previously written for NME under the name "The Legend!"). For the most part, NME only became interested in grunge after Nevermind became popular. Although it still supported new British bands, the paper was dominated by American bands, as was the music scene in general.

Although the period from 1991 to 1993 was dominated by American bands like Nirvana, British bands were not ignored. The NME still covered the indie scene and was involved with a war of words with a new band called Manic Street Preachers, who were criticising the NME for what they saw as an elitist view of bands they would champion. This came to a head in 1991, when, during an interview with Steve Lamacq, Richey Edwards would confirm the band's position by carving "4real" into his arm with a razor blade.

By 1992, the Madchester scene had died and, along with the Manics, some new British bands were beginning to appear. Suede were quickly hailed by the paper as an alternative to the heavy grunge sound and hailed as the start of a new British music scene. Grunge, however, was still the dominant force, but the rise of new British bands would become something the paper would focus on more and more.

In 1992, the NME also had a very public dispute with Morrissey due to allegations by NME's Dele Fadele that Morrissey had used racist lyrics and imagery. This erupted after the Madness reunion concerts, Madstock!, at Finsbury Park where Morrissey was seen to drape himself in a Union Jack while performing as a support act. The series of articles (starting with Fadele's one) which followed in the next edition of NME (featuring the story on the front cover) soured Morrissey's relationship with the paper, and this led to Morrissey not speaking to the paper again for the next 12 years (i.e., until 2004).

Later in 1992, Steve Sutherland, previously an assistant editor of Melody Maker, was brought in as the NME's editor to replace Danny Kelly. Andrew Collins, Stuart Maconie, Steve Lamacq, and Mary Anne Hobbs all left the NME in protest, and moved to Select; Collins, Maconie and Lamacq would all also write for Q, while Lamacq would join Melody Maker in 1997. Kelly, Collins, Maconie, Lamacq and Hobbs would all subsequently become prominent broadcasters with BBC Radio 1 as it reinvented itself under Matthew Bannister.

In April 1994, Nirvana frontman Kurt Cobain was found dead, a story which affected not only his fans and readers of the NME, but would see a massive change in British music. Grunge was about to be replaced by Britpop, a new genre influenced by 1960s British music and culture. The term was coined by NME after the band Blur released their album Parklife in the month of Cobain's death. Britpop began to fill the musical and cultural void left after Cobain's demise, and with Blur's success and the rise of a new group from Manchester called Oasis, Britpop would continue its rise for the rest of 1994. By the end of the year, Blur and Oasis were the two biggest bands in the UK, and sales of the NME were increasing thanks to the Britpop effect. In 1995, NME covered these new bands, many of whom played the NME Stage at that year's Glastonbury Festival, where the paper had been sponsoring the second stage at the festival since 1993. This would be its last year sponsoring the stage; subsequently, the stage would be known as the 'Other Stage'.

In August 1995, Blur and Oasis planned to release singles on the same day in a mass of media publicity. Steve Sutherland put the story on the front page of the paper, and was criticised for playing up the duel between the bands. Blur won the "race" for the top of the charts, and the resulting fallout from the publicity led to the paper enjoying increased sales during the 1990s as Britpop became the dominant genre. After this peak, the paper experienced a slow decline as Britpop burned itself out fairly rapidly over the next few years. This left the paper directionless again, and attempts to embrace the rise of DJ culture in the late 1990s only led to the paper being criticised for not supporting rock or indie music. The paper did attempt to return to its highly politicised 1980s incarnation by running a cover story in March 1998 condemning Tony Blair, who had previously associated himself with Britpop bands such as Oasis, and this received a certain level of attention in the wider media.

Sutherland did attempt to cover newer bands, but a 1998 cover feature on the Canadian post-rock band Godspeed You! Black Emperor saw the paper dip to a sales low, and Sutherland later stated in his weekly editorial that he regretted putting them on the cover. For many, this was seen as an affront to the principles of the paper, and sales reached a low point at the turn of the millennium. From the issue of 21 March 1999, the paper was no longer printed on newsprint, and more recently, it has shifted to tabloid size with glossy colour covers.

=== 2000s ===
In 2000, Steve Sutherland left to become brand director of the NME, and was replaced as editor by 26-year-old Melody Maker writer Ben Knowles. In the same year, Melody Maker officially merged with the NME, and many speculated the NME would be next to close, as the weekly music-magazine market was shrinking - the monthly magazine Select, which had thrived especially during the Britpop era, was closed down within a week of Melody Maker. In the early 2000s, the NME also attempted somewhat to broaden its coverage again, running cover stories on hip-hop acts such as Jay-Z and Missy Elliott, electronic musician Aphex Twin, Popstars winners Hear'say, and R&B groups such as Destiny's Child. However, as in the 1980s, these proved unpopular with much of the paper's readership, and were soon dropped. In 2001, the NME reasserted its position as an influence in new music, and helped to introduce bands including the Strokes, the Vines, and the White Stripes.

In 2002, Conor McNicholas was appointed editor, with a new wave of photographers including Dean Chalkley, Andrew Kendall, James Looker, and Pieter Van Hattem, and a high turnover of young writers. It focused on new British bands such as the Libertines, Franz Ferdinand, Bloc Party, and the Kaiser Chiefs, which had emerged as indie music continued to grow in commercial success. Later, Arctic Monkeys became the standard-bearers of the post-Libertines crop of indie bands, being both successfully championed by the NME and receiving widespread commercial and critical success.

Also in 2002, NME relaunched in a smaller format in an attempt to boost falling sales, along with a redesigned logo.

In December 2005, accusations were made that the NME end-of-year poll had been edited for commercial and political reasons. These criticisms were rebutted by McNicholas, who claimed that webzine Londonist.com had got hold of an early draft of the poll.

In October 2006, NME launched an Irish version of the magazine called NME Ireland. This coincided with the launch of Club NME in Dublin. Dublin-based band Humanzi was first to appear on the cover of NME Ireland. The Irish edition of the magazine could not compete with local competitors such as Hot Press therefore it was discontinued after its fourth issue in February 2007.

After the 2008 NME Award nominations, Caroline Sullivan of The Guardian criticised the magazine's lack of diversity, saying:

"NME bands" fall within very narrow parameters. In the 80s, the paper prided itself on its coverage of hip hop, R&B and the emerging dance scene which it took seriously and featured prominently – alongside the usual Peel-endorsed indie fare. Now, though, its range of approved bands has dramatically shrunk to a strand embodied by the [Arctic] Monkeys, Babyshambles and Muse – bands who you don't need specialist knowledge to write about and who are just "indie" enough to make readers feel they're part of a club. Like everything else in publishing, this particular direction must be in response to reader demand, but it doesn't half make for a self-limiting magazine.

In May 2008, the magazine received a redesign aimed at an older readership with a more authoritative tone. The first issue of the redesign featured a free seven-inch Coldplay vinyl single.

=== 2010s ===
Krissi Murison was appointed editor in June 2009, launching a new redesigned NME in April 2010. The issue had 10 different covers, highlighting the broader range of music the magazine would cover, and featured Jack White, Florence and the Machine, LCD Soundsystem, Rihanna, Kasabian, Laura Marling, Foals, M.I.A., Biffy Clyro and Magnetic Man.

Murison was replaced as editor in July 2012 by Mike Williams, who had previously been the magazine's deputy. Williams is now Editor in Chief, with full responsibility for NME's cross platform output. Under Williams, NME has launched the NME Daily app, a new career focussed event called Lifehacks, and successfully relaunched both the NME magazine and NME's website, NME.com.

In 2013, NME's The 500 Greatest Albums of All Time was criticized by the media. The Guardian pointed out that Features Editor Laura Snapes included, in her top 5 "greatest albums of all time", four albums from the same band which was The National. Consequence of Sound similarly observed that "if Laura Snapes had her wish, the top four would all be The National albums".

The magazine's paid circulation in the first half of 2014 was 15,830.

=== Free title ===
In February 2015, it was reported that the NME was in discussions about removing the cover price and becoming a free publication. This was confirmed in July 2015.

The free NME launched on 18 September 2015, with Rihanna on the cover. Distributed nationwide via universities, retail stores and the transport network, the first circulation numbers published in February 2016 of 307,217 copies per week were the highest in the brand's history. Since relaunch the magazine has featured many high-profile international pop stars on the cover such as Coldplay, Taylor Swift, Lana Del Rey, Kanye West and Green Day alongside emerging talent like Zara Larsson, Years & Years, Lady Leshurr and Christine and the Queens.

The free, pop-oriented NME magazine was praised for reconnecting NME with its target audience, and was awarded a silver at the 2016 Professional Publishers Association Awards for its historic first-ever cover as a free title, featuring Rihanna. Editor in Chief Mike Williams received the Editor Of The Year Award at the BSME Awards 2016, the judges stating that under Williams' leadership, NME had "bounced back from an uncertain future and established itself confidently and creatively in a new market."

By December 2017, according to the Audit Bureau of Circulations, average distribution of NME had fallen to 289,432 copies a week, although its then-publisher Time Inc. UK claimed to have more than 13 million global unique users per month, including 3 million in the UK.

In March 2018, The Guardian reported that the NME was to cease publication in print after 66 years. The online publication would continue.

In 2019, TI Media, the successor to IPC, sold NME and Uncut to Singaporean company BandLab Technologies.

=== 2020s ===
In 2021, the NME became the main brand for the music publishing division of Caldecott Music Group, when BandLab Technologies was reorganised. As well as publishing print magazines in the United Kingdom and Australia, NME Networks is responsible for a trio of online music publications and the main NME.com website, which now also has an area devoted to the Asian music scene and acts such as The Itchyworms, SEVENTEEN, Voice Of Baceprot, Sponge Cola and I Belong To The Zoo from countries such as South Korea, the Philippines and Indonesia.

On 20 July 2023, NME announced that it would be relaunching its print magazine that summer. Starting with a July/August issue featuring D4vd, each bimonthly issue will showcase a rising musical talent. NME Networks' chief operating and commercial officer Holly Bishop explained that the company was "inspired by the resurgence we've seen in vinyl and cassette tapes" to bring a physical edition back for music fans.

== NME Australia ==
In December 2018, BandLab Technologies announced the launch of NME Australia. Initially a website only, new interviews were given covers and numbered as issues, with Amyl & The Sniffers on the inaugural cover. At the time BandLab announced the Australian edition would not have a local editor, and would instead be controlled by a team in London and Singapore, with content from Australian contributors.

A print edition was announced in April 2020, beginning with issue #5, following their online covers numbering. Tash Sultana became the first cover artist for the print edition, which have gone on to feature artists such as The Avalanches, Jaguar Jonze, Tkay Maidza, and Lorde on future covers.

The magazine publishes six issues each year, with new content added to the website frequently.

== NME.com ==
In 1996, the NME launched its website NME.com under the stewardship of editor Steve Sutherland and publisher Robert Tame. Its first editor was Brendan Fitzgerald. Eewei Chen was the first designer of the website. Later, Anthony Thornton redesigned the site, focusing on music news. In November 1999, the site hosted the UK's first webcast, of Suede "Live in Japan". In 2001, the site gave away a free MP3 of the Strokes' single "Last Nite" a week before its release.

The website was awarded Online Magazine of the Year in 1999 and 2001; Anthony Thornton was awarded Website Editor of the Year on three occasions – 2001 and 2002 (British Society of Magazine Editors) and 2002 (Periodical Publishers Association).

In 2004, Ben Perreau joined NME.com as the website's third editor. He relaunched and redeveloped the title in September 2005 and the focus was migrated towards video, audio and the wider music community. It was awarded Best Music Website at the Record of the Day awards in October 2005. In 2006, it was awarded the BT Digital Music Award for Best Music Magazine and the first chairman's Award from the Association of Online Publishers awarded by the chairman Simon Waldman in recognition of its pioneering role in its 10-year history.

In 2007, NME.com was launched in the US with additional staff.

In October 2007, David Moynihan joined as the website's fourth editor. In 2008, the site won the BT Digital Music Award for Best Music Magazine, plus the Association of Online Publishers' Best Editorial Team Award, the British Society of Magazine Editors Website Editor of the Year and the Record of the Day Award for Best Music Website. In June 2009, NME.com won the Periodical Publishers Association (PPA) award for Interactive Consumer Magazine of the Year. In 2010, it won both the AOP and PPA website of the year award. That same year, NME.com expanded its coverage to include movies and TV as well as music.

Luke Lewis took over as editor of NME.com in March 2011, bringing a new focus on video content and user engagement, bringing comments to the fore and introducing user ratings on reviews. In 2011, NME.com had over seven million monthly unique users (source: Omniture SiteCatalyst, 2011).

In May 2011, NME.com launched NMEVideo.com, a sister site dedicated to video, and released the NME Festivals smartphone app. Sponsored by BlackBerry, it featured line-ups, stage times, photo galleries and backstage video interviews, and was downloaded 30,000 times. The following month, NME launched its first iPad app, dedicated to Jack White.

In September 2011, NME.com organised and live-blogged a real-time Twitter listening party of Nirvana's 1991 album Nevermind to mark that album's 20th anniversary. The site also launched a new series of self-produced band documentary films, entitled The Ultimate Guide.

In October 2011, the site celebrated its 15th birthday by publishing a list of the 150 best tracks of NME.com's lifetime. The number one song was Radiohead's "Paranoid Android".

In 2015, NME appointed Charlotte Gunn as digital editor, replacing Greg Cochrane. Under Gunn, NME.com doubled in size and with a focus on social and video built a sustainable future as an online only brand. Gunn was appointed Editor in March 2018, after the closure of the weekly print magazine, and left the post in February 2020.

In 2020, NME.com began its Gaming channel. NME Networks' Chief Operating and Commercial Officer Holly Bishop stated that it would include "long reads, hero content, franchises, reviews and interactive streams".

== NME Awards ==
NME Awards is an awards show held every year to celebrate the best new music of the past year. The nominations and eventual winners are voted for by the readers of the magazine. The 2022 ceremony, branded as the BandLab NME Awards 2022, took place on 2 March 2022 at the O2 Academy Brixton.

== NME Tours ==
NME sponsors a tour of the United Kingdom by up-and-coming bands each year.

== NME Originals ==
In 2002, the NME started publishing a series of themed magazines reprinting vintage articles, interviews and reviews from its archives. The magazine special editions were called NME Originals, with some featuring articles from other music titles owned by IPC, including Melody Maker, Rave and Uncut magazines. Notable issues so far have featured Arctic Monkeys, Radiohead, the Beatles, punk rock, gothic rock, Britpop, the Rolling Stones, mod, Nirvana, and the solo years of the Beatles. The series has had several editors, the most prominent of whom have been Steve Sutherland and Chris Hunt. The most recent issue of NME Originals was published in 2005, as these themed archive magazines have been issued under the Uncut associated titles The Ultimate Music Guide and Ultimate Genre Guide instead.

== NME Radio ==
NME Radio, the first NME-branded radio station launched in 2008, owned by DX Media. The station came to a sudden end five years later, but NME relaunched in 2018. Since 2023, the second iteration of the radio station no longer carries the NME brand and it is now known as TMM (The Music Machine).

== NME Networks ==
In December 2021, BandLab Technologies became Caldecott Music Group (CMG) with the publisher's former name now being used for CMG's music technology division. The NME brand was put under a new division called NME Networks, which also includes Guitar.com, and MusicTech. It also formerly included Uncut magazine, until this was sold in 2023.

In 2022, NME Networks hired Jeremy Abbott as Managing Editor, a role in which he would be "responsible for leading the day-to-day editorial operations for all titles such as NME, NME Asia, NME Australia, Guitar.com and MusicTech, with the aim of building and maintaining a world-class music and pop culture new media group." He departed NME Networks in 2023.

== Editors ==
1952: Ray Sonin
1957: Andy Gray
1971: Alan Smith
1973: Nick Logan
1978: Neil Spencer
1985: Ian Pye
1987: Alan Lewis
1990: Danny Kelly
1992: Steve Sutherland
2000: Ben Knowles
2002: Conor McNicholas
2009: Krissi Murison
2012: Mike Williams
2018: Charlotte Gunn

== See also ==
- NME Album of the Year
- NME Single of the Year
