= Anna Harvey =

Editorial Director of Condé Nast

- Born: 12 September 1944
- Died: 9 October 2018 (aged 74)
- Employer: Condé Nast Publications
- Title: Vice-President & Editorial Director, Condé Nast New Markets

Anna Harvey (12 September 1944 – 9 October 2018) was a British fashion journalist. She became Editorial Director of Condé Nast New Markets in 1997.

Harvey was Deputy Editor of British Vogue, and also stylist and confidante to Diana, Princess of Wales. Her career at Condé Nast Publications spanned more than 30 years and she was regarded as one of the most significant contributors to the fashion industry.

== Career ==
Harvey began her career at Harper’s & Queen magazine (now Harper's Bazaar) where she worked alongside Anna Wintour as Junior Fashion Editor. On the recommendation of Norman Parkinson, she joined Condé Nast Publications in 1970 as Fashion Director of Brides magazine.

Following a brief stint at Good Housekeeping, she returned to Condé Nast working at different times as Deputy Editor of Tatler magazine and Fashion Director of British Vogue, alongside Grace Coddington, Liz Tilberis and Sheila Wetton.

While at Vogue, she became personal style advisor to Diana, Princess of Wales, and eventually became Deputy Editor of Vogue under Alexandra Shulman, a role which was created specifically for her. Whilst at Vogue, she worked with many well-known figures including photographers Patrick Demarchelier and Arthur Elgort as well as Kate Moss, Naomi Campbell and Linda Evangelista whose first appearances in Vogue she directed. With her appetite whetted by the expansion of Vogue on a worldwide scale, she joined Condé Nast International as Editorial Director in 1997.

== Recognition ==
Having met Diana for the first time as Lady Diana Spencer in 1980 whilst Fashion Director of British Vogue, Harvey was chosen by her editor at the time, Beatrix Miller, to advise Diana on her choice of wardrobe, a role she continued throughout Diana's marriage to the Prince of Wales and subsequent divorce.

Enlisting the help of designers such as Catherine Walker, Jacques Azagury and Versace, she turned Princess Diana from a Laura Ashley-sheathed Sloane into an international style icon. Anna said of Diana, "She knew what she liked and what she wanted and it was nothing necessarily to do with what was fashionable".

She was known for having brought a number of well-known photographers, designers and fashion figures to Vogue and to the attention of the wider public including Steven Meisel, Bruce Weber, Isabella Blow and fashion-writer Plum Sykes. Both Tamara Mellon and Isabella Cawdor (née Stanhope) were former assistants.

In 1986, Harpers & Queen named Harvey as the 23rd most influential person in Britain (with the Princess of Wales eight places behind her).
