= Finch Restorations =

Australian car restoration company

Finch Motor Company Pty. Ltd.
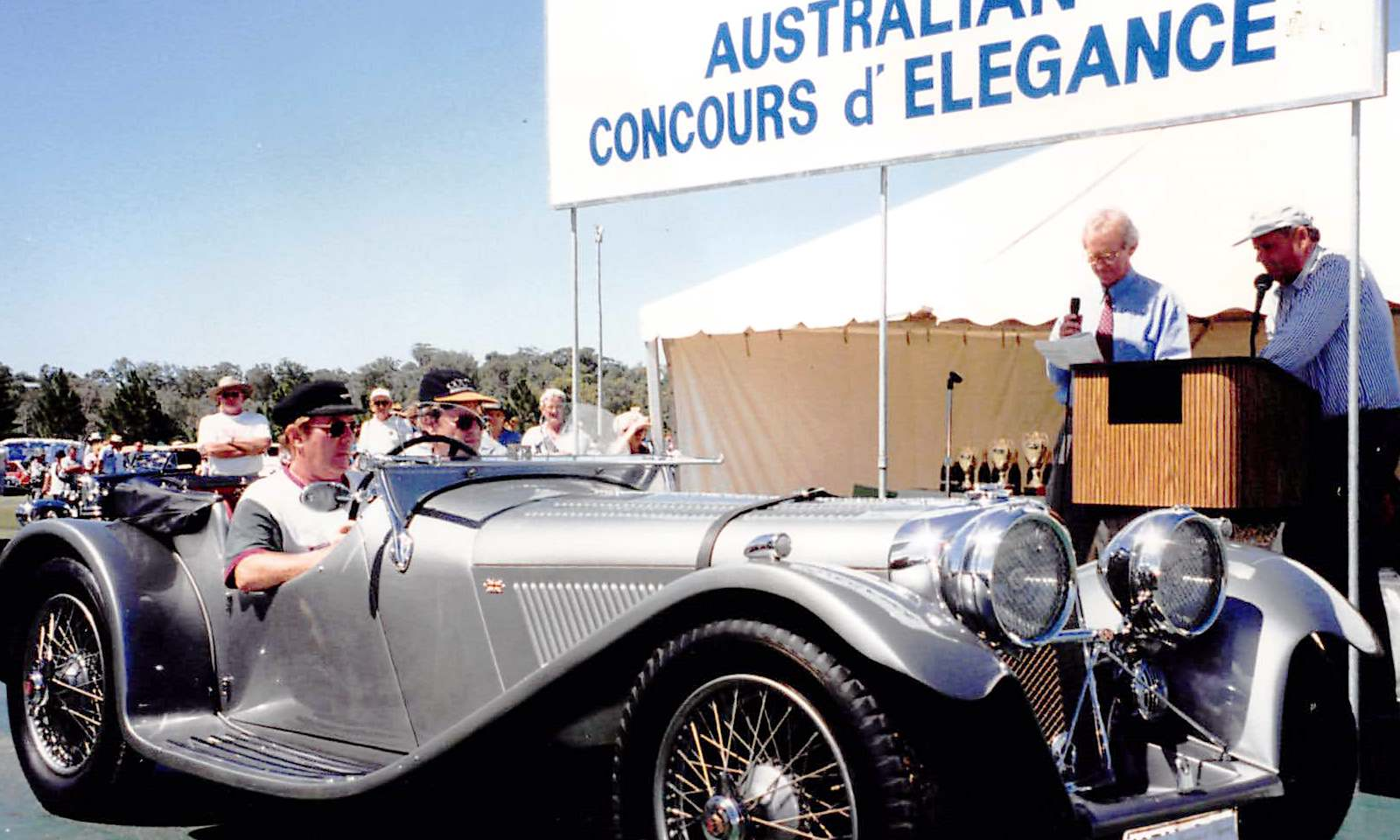
- Finch SS100 winning Australian Concours d'Elegance
- Industry: Automotive
- Founded: 1964/65
- Founder: Ray Finch
- Headquarters: Hindmarsh, South Australia
- Products: SS Jaguar 100 & Ferrari Replicas and car restorations
- Number of employees: 10-20 (estimate)
- Website: www.finchrestorations.com.au

Finch Restorations is an Australian car restoration company headquartered in Hindmarsh, South Australia, with additional operations in Woodside. It also builds 1939 SS100 Jaguar and 1959 Ferrari Testa Rossa replicas. The company has been owned by Peter and Harbinda Roberts since 2014.

The business was founded in 1965 by Ray Finch in Mount Gambier.

Finch Restorations has specialised in ground-up rebuilds of cars and trucks, with a focus on classic and vintage vehicles as well as restoration of long-owned personal vehicles.

Finch Restorations formerly operated several adjacent facilities at its Mount Barker headquarters, while Finch Powerhouse operated from Woodside, providing vehicle maintenance, engine rebuilding and tuning services.

The company began relocating operations to Hindmarsh in 2024, initially transferring its Paint Shop, followed by its Trim Shop and Project Management Office in 2025. The relocation from Mount Barker was completed by 30 June 2026, with staff and workshop operations transferred to its Hindmarsh flagship facility and Finch Powerhouse at Woodside.

The company has also introduced advanced engineering and project management systems, including the use of 3D scanning technology to reproduce rare or unavailable parts, reflecting a shift toward more complex and large-scale restoration projects.

By the early 2020s, Finch Restorations had grown from a small workshop into one of the largest vehicle restoration businesses in Australia, employing close to 30 staff.

The company has highlighted an ongoing shortage of skilled tradespeople in the automotive restoration sector, particularly in traditional crafts such as coachbuilding, metal finishing, and mechanical work on older vehicles. According to its management, the decline of "old-school" skills and training programs has made it increasingly difficult to recruit workers capable of restoring vintage vehicles using traditional techniques.
