= SS 90 =

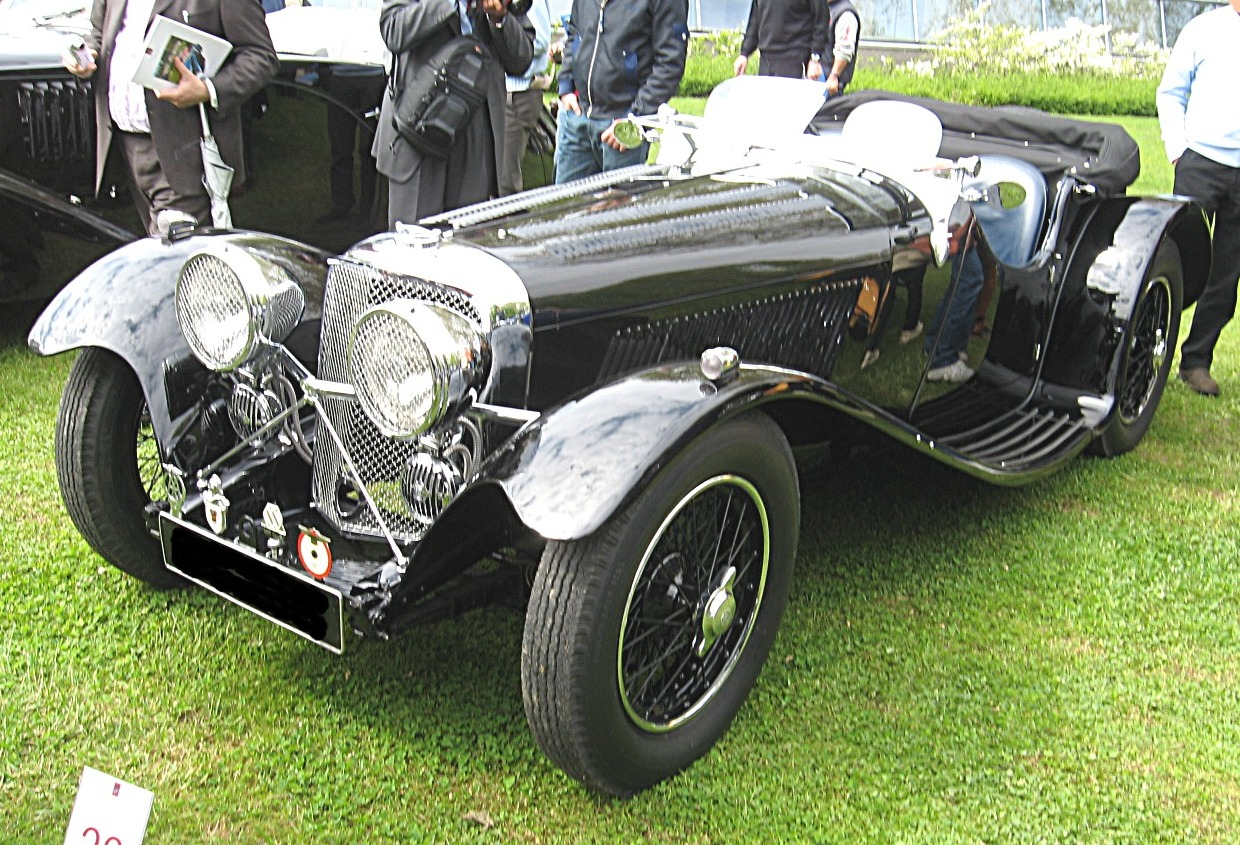

Overview
- Manufacturer: SS Cars Ltd
- Production: 1935–1936
- Assembly: United Kingdom: Coventry

Body and chassis
- Class: Sports car (S)
- Body style: 2-seat Tourer
- Layout: FR layout
- Related: SS 1; SS Jaguar 100

Powertrain
- Engine: 2,663 cc Straight-six

Dimensions
- Wheelbase: 2,642 mm
- Length: 3,810 mm
- Width: 1,600 mm
- Kerb weight: 1,143 kg

Chronology
- Successor: SS Jaguar 100

The SS 90 is a British sports car that was built by SS Cars in Coventry, England, in 1935. In 1945, the company changed its name to Jaguar.

The car has a six-cylinder side-valve Standard engine of 2,663 cc with an output of 50 kW. The engine differs from that used in the ordinary cars by having Dural connecting rods, an aluminium cylinder head with 7:1 compression ratio, and twin RAG carburettors. The chassis is 2,642 mm long; a shortened version of the one used on the SS 1, and was also supplied by Standard. Suspension is by half-elliptical springs all round, with an underslung back axle. The braking system is Bendix.

The model rapidly gained attention for its elegant sporting styling, but was not well regarded by the sporting fraternity as its performance did not match its appearance. True sports car performance came with the SS Jaguar 100, which had similar styling and suspension but an engine with an overhead-valve cylinder head.

The SS 90 does not seem to have been tested independently by any magazines, so contemporary performance figures are unknown. However, it was widely believed to be capable of reaching 150 km/h (93 mph).

The factory originally fitted 139.7 × 457.2 Dunlop tyres on 457.2 mm wire wheels. The prototype SS 90, ARW 395, was owned by Hugh Kennard from 1938 until at least November 1940. 23 were built, of which 16 survive, including the prototype.

== Gallery ==
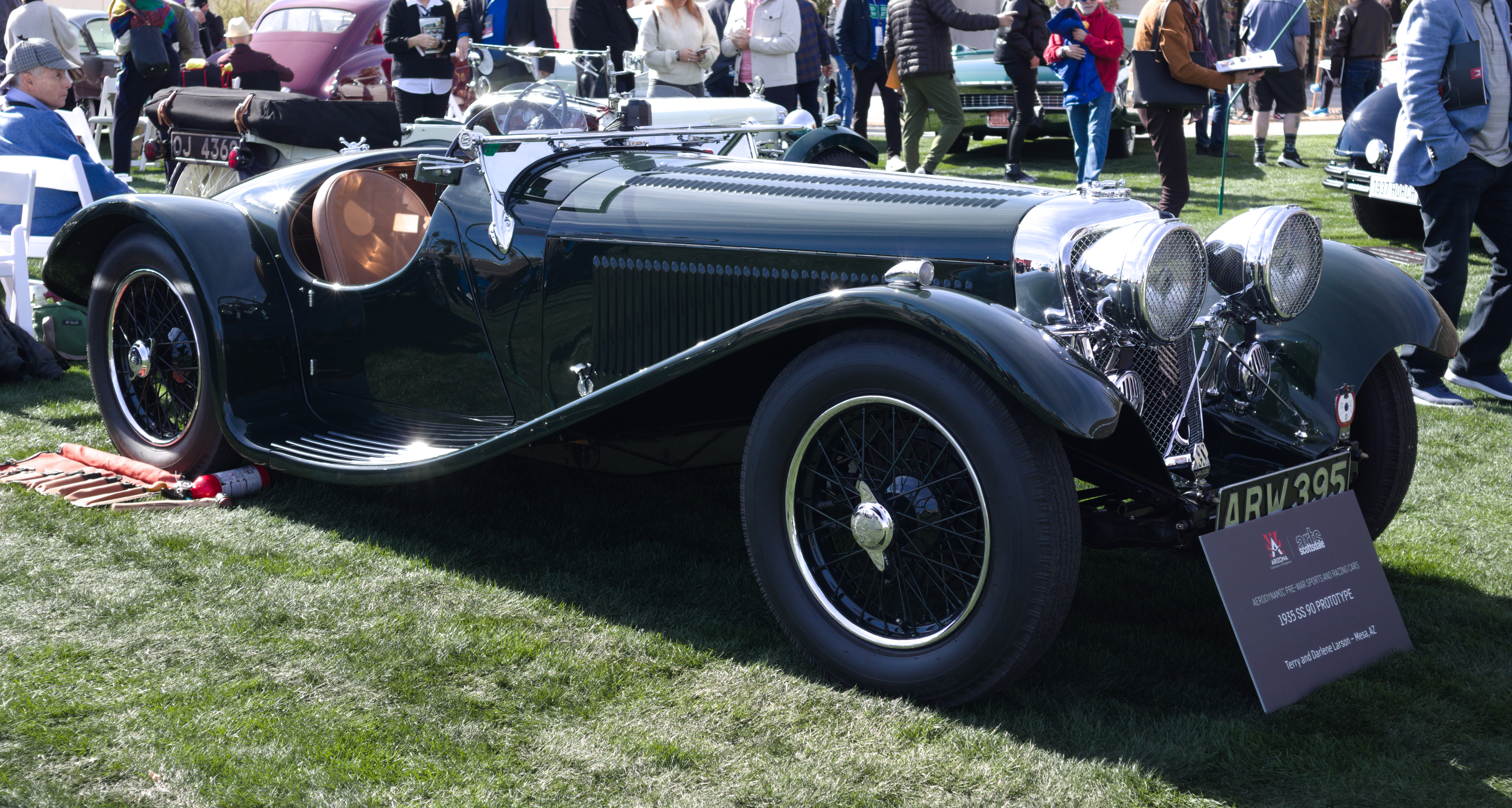
1935 SS 90 prototype

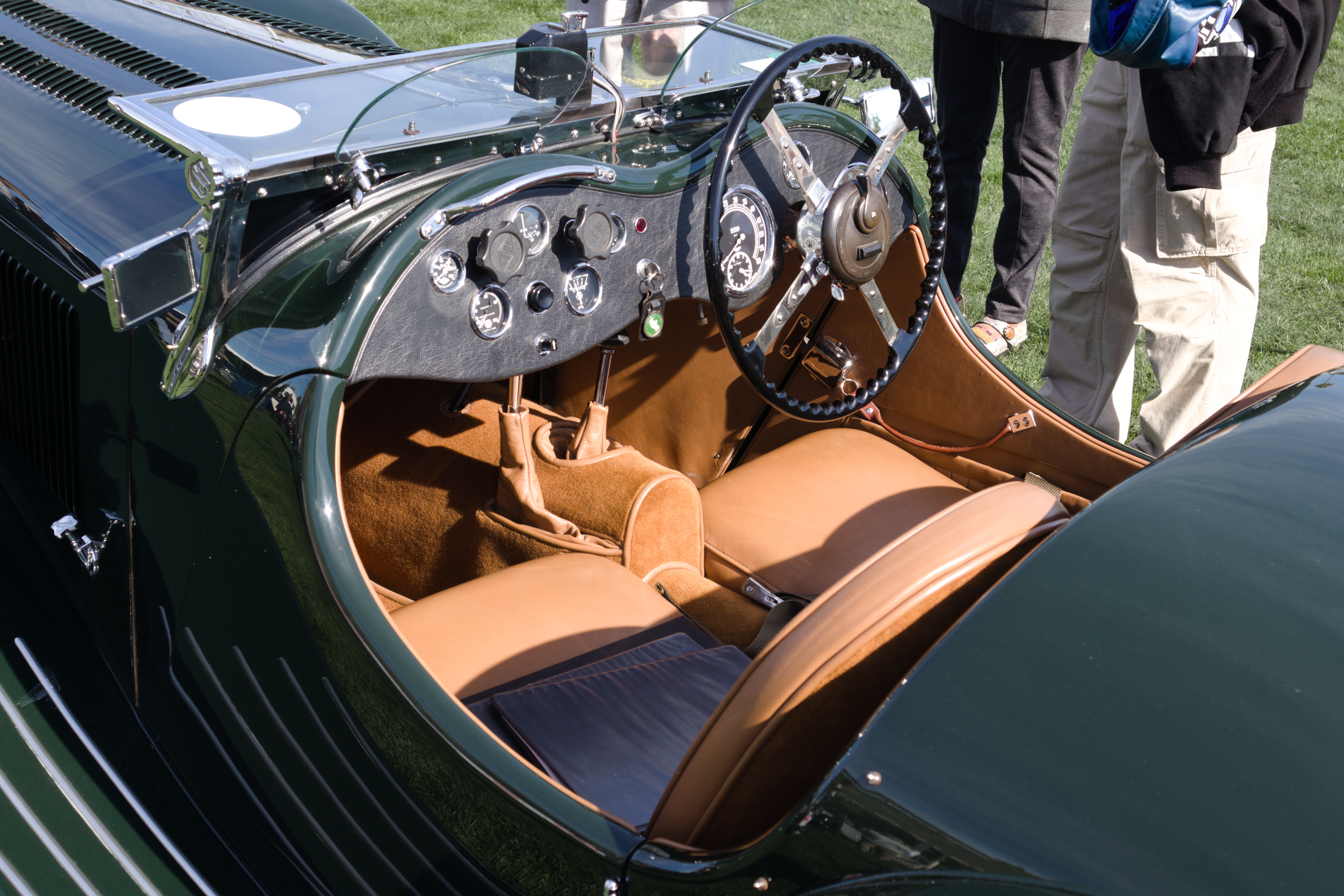
SS 90 prototype interior

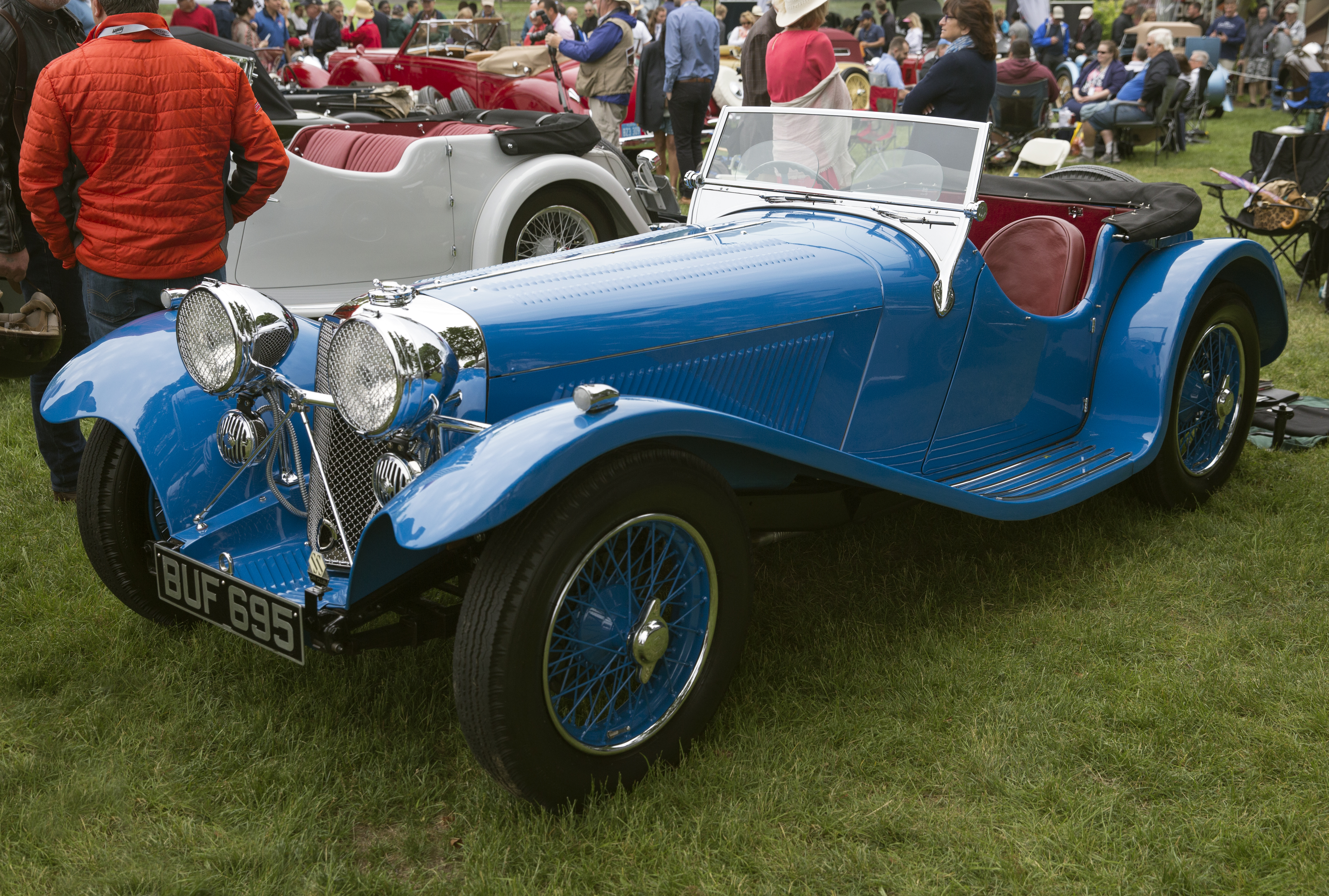
1935 SS 90
