= Jewels in the Crown =

2013 book by Ray Hutton

Jewels In The Crown
- Author: Ray Hutton
- Language: English
- Genre: Non Fiction
- Publisher: Elliott & Thompson
- Publication date: 2013
- Publication place: England
- Media type: Print (Hardback)
- ISBN: 978-1-908739-82-7

Jewels In The Crown is a non-fiction book by English author Ray Hutton.

== Summary ==
The work explores Jaguar's early success under William Lyons, the man behind the creation of the Swallow Sidecar Company in 1922 (Jaguar's predecessor), and Jaguar's struggles following failed changes in leadership. It also covers the several changes in ownership the company experienced between its sale to Ford in 1989 and its sale, as Jaguar Land Rover, to Tata Motors in 2008.

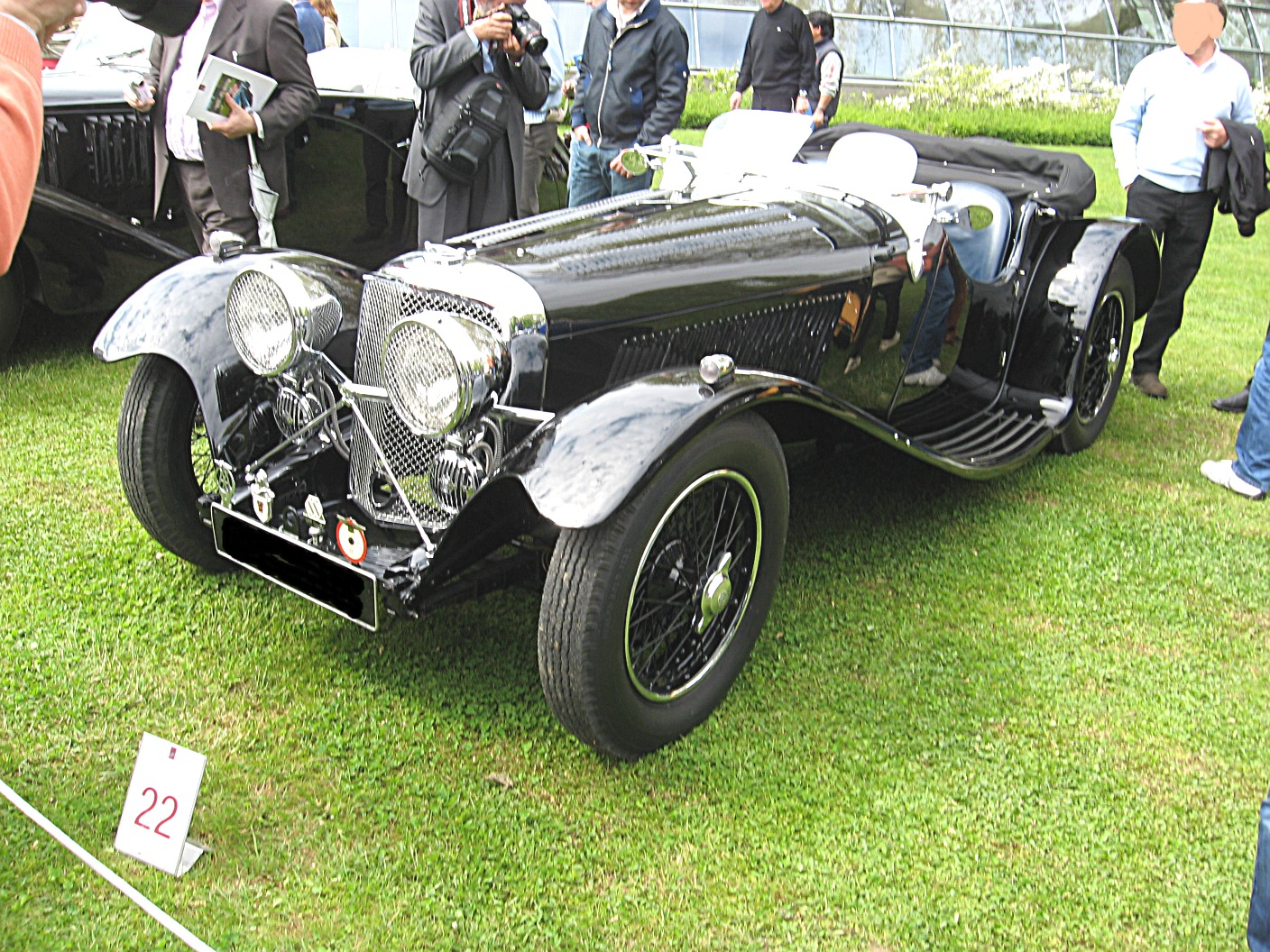
The 2.5-litre, 68 hp 1935 SS 90

== About the author ==
Ray Hutton has been writing about the motor industry for more than 35 years. A former editor-in-chief of Autocar magazine, his work appears in publications all over the world, including the Sunday Times, Motor Trader, Car & Driver and Overdrive. Ray is the honorary president of the international Car of the Year Jury and vice president of the UK Guild of Motoring Trophy, awarded by the Guild of Motoring Writers, and, on two occasions, the Bentley International Award.

== Reviews ==
- Business Standard News
