= Tom Gilbey (designer) =

British fashion designer (1938–2017)

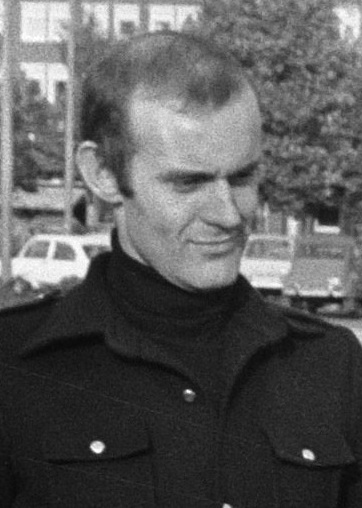
- Tom Gilbey in 1969
- Born: 19 May 1938; New Cross, London, England
- Died: 24 May 2017 (aged 79)
- Occupation: Fashion designer

Tom Gilbey (19 May 1938 – 24 May 2017) was a British fashion designer associated with Savile Row tailoring of the 1960s. His designs have featured in the Fashion Museum, Bath, and are in the collections of the Victoria & Albert Museum and the Museum of London.

== Early life ==
Tom Gilbey was born and grew up in a working-class family in New Cross, London. He left school at the age of fifteen.

== Career ==
Gilbey entered the fashion industry in the 1960s.

In an article by Robin Dutt in London Portrait, entitled 'Major Tom', Gilbey recalled that 'the sixties was a decade of intense brilliance and horrific mistakes-in those days everybody was a somebody, and somebody was nobody'

Of his early days as a young designer Gilbey in a BBC documentary entitled Going to Work, The Rag Trade, states...'I started in a small, bespoke workshop in South London, and learned cutting and tailoring...all the practical and technical side'...’from there I attended Shoreditch Clothing college'. Emphasising at a young age, the practicalities of producing an actual garment Gilbey sagaciously advises potential designers…'it's all right doing sketches and things on paper, but you've got to sit down and get your form and get your line, and this is what you've got to convey to a machinist'…

Described as an iconoclast in the book, The Savile Row Story by Richard Walker, Gilbey describes the world into which he entered in 1968; 'It was a gentleman's world, a gentleman's club'. Based in Sackville Street at an address that was once the headquarters of the Masini Brothers, who controlled the seedier West End clubs in the 1920s, Tom explains the link between the number of fittings required for a suit and the underworld: ‘..and in the back, or round the corner, would be something else – in lots of cases that's where the dozens of fittings came from’. Expanding on this link between tailoring and the underworld, Tom continues: ‘those Chicago gangsters like Al Capone in the tailor’s shop, with all the action out at the back’

Speaking about new entrants to the Savile Row area then, Gilbey commented in The Independent, "You had Tommy Nutter, Rupert Lycett Green, Michael Fish and myself ... Tommy Nutter wasn't a tailor and a cutter. He came from the sales side."

Putting down an early marker as to his design philosophy in the 1967 book by Rodney Bennett-England, entitled Dress Optional; the revolution in menswear, Gilbey says "More people than ever are working, and harder too. They want clothes they can put on and forget about, but clothes that nevertheless look right and help them do the job. Such clothes must have ease of movement, easy-care properties, accent on design simplicity."

In the Tom Gilbey First Couture Programme notes of May 1968, Gilbey expands on his philosophy in 'The Tom Gilbey Concept': ' One-case-manship is an instant guide to how we have to dress. Clothes must be light and interchangeable but correctly co-ordinated so that a man's basic clothes have a many purpose life; they must take him, often without the need to change, from hard work to hard play.’

Rave reviews followed Gilbey's first Mens Couture Collection, amongst them Christopher Ward in the Daily Mirror, heralded Gilbey as 'one of Britain's more avant garde designers',...'a pioneer of the polo-neck, the cat suit, and the zip-up jacket'

A 1968 suit of his is in the collection of the Victoria & Albert Museum, which writes of it, "Worn with a silk rollneck shirt, this suit exemplifies the informal dress codes of the later 1960s. The revolutionary idea of replacing the shirt and tie reached even to Savile Row establishments. Gilbey uses a traditional tweed for a futuristic design, incorporating zipped front and pocket fastenings.".

A 1969 suit in the Museum of London comes from Gilbey's shop in Sackville Street, where it required four fittings. It was made to be worn on a Queen Elizabeth II sailing from New York to Southampton on 8 October 1969, for dinner at the captain's table – "The wearer later regretted his choice, which looked totally out of place at a formal occasion where dinner jackets were the norm."

However, as Gilbey pointed out to Cliff Waller in The News, Mexico City the same year: ‘a man will always be more comfortable if he is wearing the clothes – not the clothes wearing him’

There were further positive reviews from Gilbey's 1970 show. In July, the Evening Standard reported: Softly, Slouchy-that's the message. Tom Gilbey, one of London's most successful and consistently interesting menswear designers, says that men's clothes should be languid, moody and slouchy...presented in his couture collection-a white jump suit that looks as though your vest has grown trousers...comfortable wear for a long hot summer-and slouchy enough.

Later the same month, Men's Wear magazine reported in an article entitled ‘Gilbey for every occasion’, ‘This was, above all, a collection of really wearable designs without sacrificing originality. I will be surprised if the couturiers in Rome and Paris between them, produce anything better.’

In the early 1970s, the snooker player Alex Higgins wore a Gilbey outfit whilst playing a match in a packed hall in Bombay. In high temperatures without air conditioning, Higgins found it unsuitable, and "sweated off another eight ounces in weight" with every ball he hit.

In 1995 one of his bridegroom's outfits was chosen, along with a Catherine Rayner wedding gown, to represent the Dress of the Year for 1995 in the Fashion Museum, Bath. He is particularly known for designing waistcoats.

Reminiscing to Joshua Sims in Rock Fashion in 1999, Gilbey recalls a number of anecdotes from his long career: ‘It wasn’t until Bill Haley came to Britain that Teddy Boys became the archetypal ruffian. Before that it had been about posing, but the music gave people a reason to dress up other than to parade around looking in shop windows at yourself.’ Regarding The Beatles ‘I think it’s fair to say that they did steal that collarless look from Pierre Cardin. But their look did evolve from that. I was involved in making other funny collars for them at the time, and made the Capes for ‘Help’’ ‘The Mod look was very functional in a way. The bum-freezer jacket with its double vents facilitated sitting on a scooter. It was derived from the British hunting jacket, of course’ ‘I was asked to design a look for The Kinks and decided that a Regency look would go with their haircuts, so I made those high collared jackets and put them with frilly-fronted shirts. I’m still owed £1,500 for doing that’

The Fashion Book, an informative and definitive compendium of international designers, summarised Gilbey's career thus: ‘With his trademark simplicity and almost militaristic neatness, Gilbey was an important force in menswear in the 1960s…Gilbey is one of fashions visionaries’.

== Personal life ==
Gilbey's second marriage was to literary agent Sally Riley in Kensington and Chelsea in 2005. The couple lived in London and had a second home on the Isle of Wight.

He died from cancer on 24 May 2017, at the age of 79.
