= Linda Kelsey (journalist) =

British journalist, magazine editor and author

Linda Kelsey (born 15 April 1952) is a British journalist and author, and a former editor of the UK edition of Cosmopolitan.

== Early life ==
Kelsey was born in north London, and lived in Finchley. She attended a co-educational grammar school in north London.

== Career ==
She became a sub-editor of Good Housekeeping in 1970 for two years. In 1972 she joined Cosmopolitan, then owned by the National Magazine Company (Nat Mags); there were seven staff. In 1975 she became a features editor on Cosmopolitan until 1978. She became Editor of Cosmopolitan in 1985. She became Editor of She in 1989.

Cosmopolitan was launched in the UK in 1972, with Joyce Hopkirk as its Editor.

== Publications ==
- Fifty is Not a Four-letter Word, 2007
- The Twenty Year Itch, 2010

== Personal life ==
She married in 1972, and divorced in 1980, aged 26. She married Christian Testorf in 1999 and they have one son (born July 1988).

Media offices
Preceded by	Editor of She; 1989–1995	Succeeded by
Preceded by	Editor of Cosmopolitan (UK); 1985–1989	Succeeded by Marcelle D'Argy Smith
Preceded by	Deputy Editor of Cosmopolitan (UK); 1983–1985	Succeeded by
