= Autocar (magazine) =

Oldest car magazine

- Cover of 6 November 2024 issue
- Editor: Mark Tisshaw
- Categories: Automobile
- Frequency: Weekly
- Circulation: 14,366 (Jan–Dec 2023)
- Publisher: Haymarket Media Group
- Founded: 1895; 131 years ago
- Country: United Kingdom
- Language: English
- Website: www.autocar.co.uk
- ISSN: 1355-8293

Autocar (stylized in all caps) is a weekly British automobile magazine published by Haymarket Media Group. It was first published in 1895 and refers to itself as "the world's oldest car magazine". Mark Tisshaw is editor and other team members include Steve Cropley, Rachel Burgess, James Attwood, Matt Prior, Matt Saunders and Felix Page.

Autocar has several international editions, including China, India, New Zealand, and South Africa.

== History ==
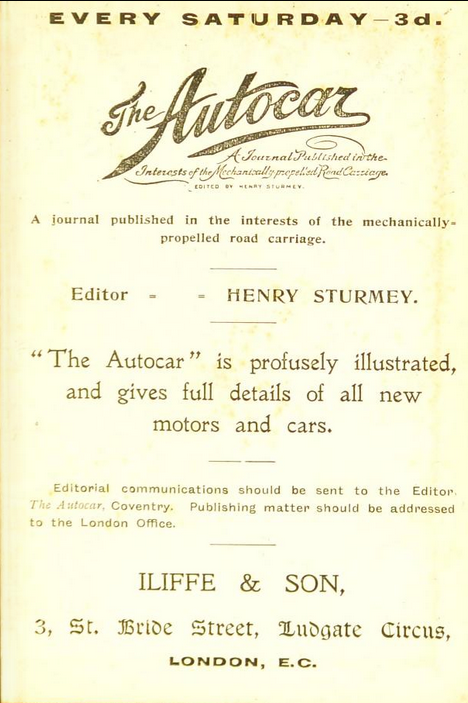
1897 advert for Autocar

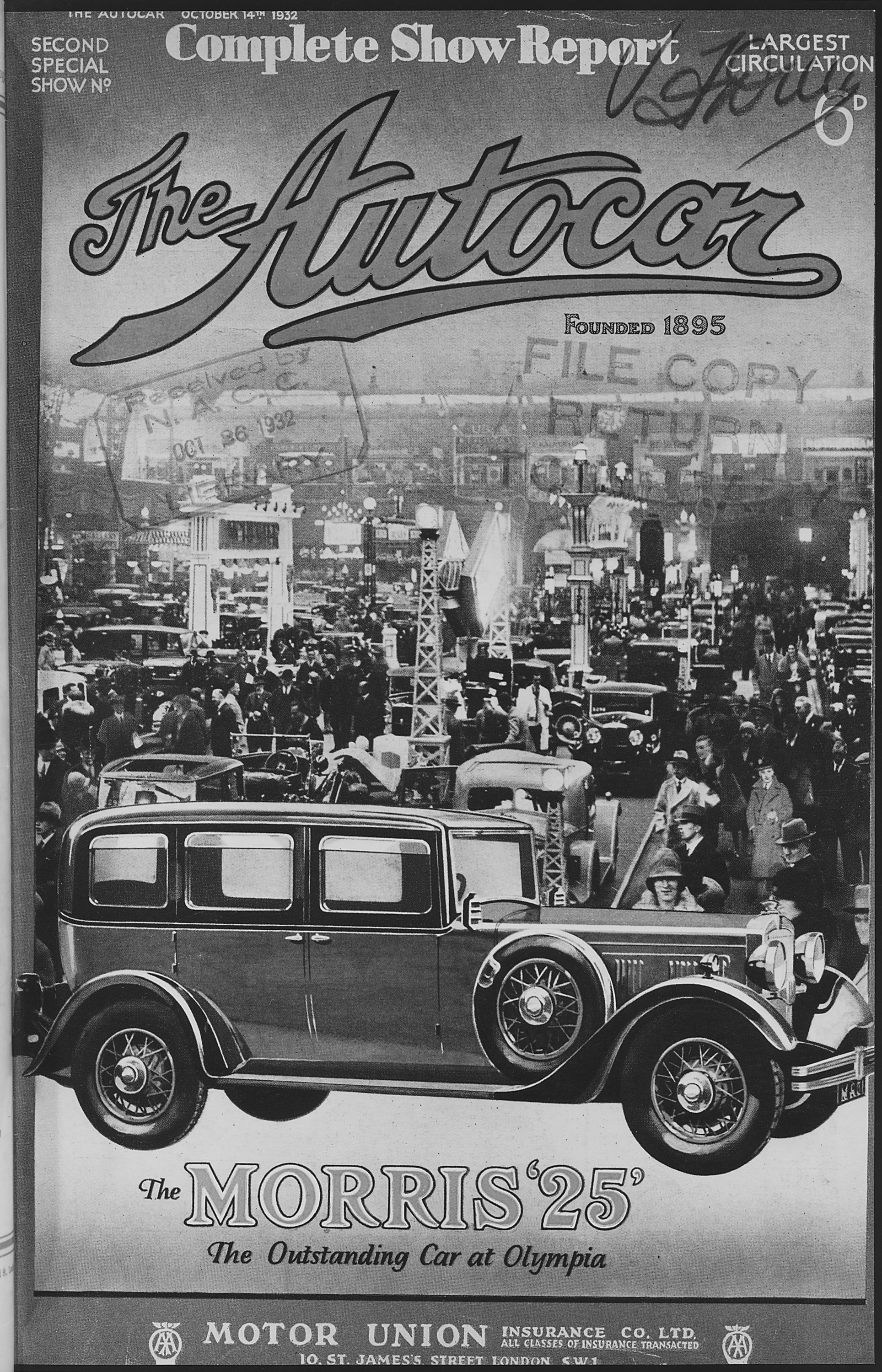
14 October 1932 issue

Cover of the 19 October 2004 issue, showing previous design

The publication was launched as The Autocar by Iliffe and Son Ltd. "in the interests of the mechanically propelled road carriage" on 2 November 1895 when, it is believed, there were only six or seven cars in the United Kingdom. L. J. K. Setright suggests that the magazine was set up by Henry Sturmey as an organ of propaganda for Harry J. Lawson, founder of the Daimler Company and a journalist on the magazine in its early days. Henry Sturmey stood down as editor of The Autocar magazine and left the company in 1901.

Autocar claims to have invented the road test in 1928 when it analysed the Austin 7 Gordon England Sunshine Saloon. Autocar has been published weekly throughout its life with only strikes in the 1970s interrupting its frequency.

The magazine's name was changed from The Autocar to Autocar at the start of 1962.

In 1988 Autocar absorbed the rival magazine Motor, with which it had done battle on the newsstands since 1903. From the 7 September 1988 issue the magazine became Autocar & Motor. It reverted to Autocar for the 21 September 1994 issue.

The magazine has scored many firsts in its history, including the first full road tests and independent performance tests of the Jaguar XJ220, McLaren F1, and the Porsche 911 GT1.

It was also the first magazine to produce independently recorded performance figures for the Bugatti Veyron, which were published in the 31 May 2006 issue.

In 2023, Autocar digitised its entire archive dating back to 1895. The Autocar Archive is available to subscribers online.

== Regular features ==
- News – includes "scoop" photographs and information about still-secret future models
- First drives – brief road tests of new models
- Group tests – analysis of how a model compares relative to rivals
- Motorsport – summaries of current racing news, predominantly in Formula 1 and rallying
- Road tests – Thorough test and analysis of one new model per issue. In the issue closest to Christmas, Autocar traditionally publishes a "road test" of a more unusual vehicle. These have included tests of New Routemaster, HMS Ark Royal, Concorde, and HMS Diamond.
- Used car news
- Long term car tests
- New car data

== Writers and illustrators ==
In the 1950s, the magazine's sport editor, John Cooper, used Cooper T11 parts to create the Cooper-Alta. Former Autocar writers include Russell Bulgin, Chris Harris, and former Top Gear presenter James May.

In 1992, May was fired from Autocar after he added an acrostic into the 1992 "Road Test Yearbook". May had to write every review in the issue. Each spread featured four reviews and each review started with a big red capital letter known as a rubricated initial. May was bored and to alleviate the boredom, he wrote the reviews so the first four spreads would spell the words "ROAD", "TEST", "YEAR" and "BOOK". The other pages had another acrostic but that was not immediately recognizable as it was spread over the rest of the magazine, spelling seemingly random letters starting with "SOYO" and "UTHI". After it was published, readers discovered it. This was the one that got James May fired because it used profanity. The message, when punctuated was: "So you think it's really good, yeah? You should try making the bloody thing up; it's a real pain in the arse."

Current Autocar writers include Richard Bremner, used car expert James Ruppert, Editor at Large Matt Prior and Editor in Chief Steve Cropley.

The current editor is Mark Tisshaw, a former deputy editor, news editor and reporter for the magazine.

=== Editors ===
- 1895–1901 Henry Sturmey
- 1901–?[after 1914] Herbert Walter Staner
- ?–? Hugo Massac Thomas Buist
- 1930–1938 Harold Carlisle Lafone
- 1955–1968 Maurice Armstrong Smith
- 1968–1975 Peter Garnier
- 1975–1985 Ray Hutton
- ?1985–?1991 Bob Murray
- 1991–1997 Michael Harvey
- 1997–2001 Patrick Fuller
- 2001–2006 Rob Aherne
- 2006–2011 Chas Hallett (editor of What Car? 2011–2014)
- 2011–2013 Jim Holder (editor of What Car? 2014–2016)
- 2014–2017 Chas Hallett
- 2017–present Mark Tisshaw

== International editions ==
Autocar has been licensed to publishers around the world, and is now published in sixteen countries outside the United Kingdom, including China, India, Indonesia, Japan, Malaysia, and Vietnam.
