= Conor McNicholas =

British journalist and editor

Conor McNicholas is a British journalist and editor. He formerly edited Top Gear and the IPC-run music magazine New Musical Express (NME).

== Career ==
In 2007, Morrissey announced that he was going to sue both McNicholas and NME for libel over an article on the singer's views on immigration. The case was settled in June 2012 when NME issued a statement saying "we apologise to Morrissey if he or anyone else misunderstood our piece".

In 2009 McNicholas left the NME to take over as the editor of Top Gear magazine. He left after less than a year to work at News International on the launch of Buzz magazine at The Sun.

He later served as Executive Content Director at the content agency Redwood before going on to be CEO of the full service digital engagement agency AllTogetherNow within the WPP Group, which he founded in 2014.

Media offices
| Preceded by Ben Knowles | Editor of the NME; 2002–2009 | Succeeded by Krissi Murison |
