= Brides (magazine) =

American magazine founded 1934

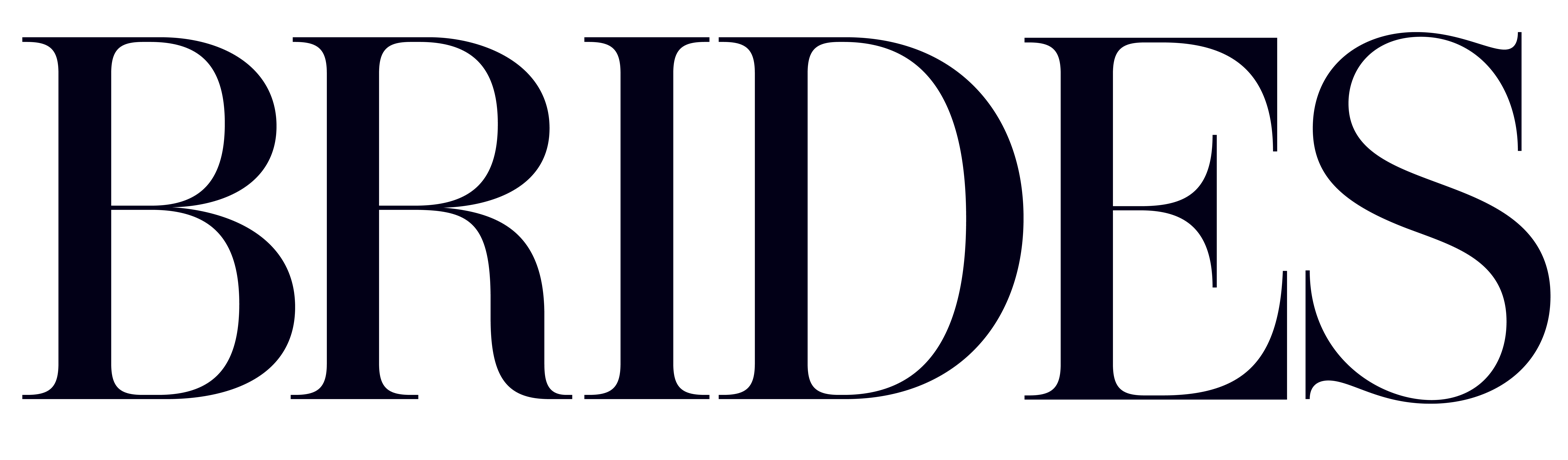

- March 2009 cover of Brides
- Editor: Gabriella Rello Duffy; (Editorial Director); Corinne Pierre-Louis; (Senior Fashion Editor); Jessica Chassin; (Senior Social Media Editor)
- Frequency: Quarterly
- Publisher: People Inc.
- Total circulation (2013): 330,605
- Founded: 1934
- Company: IAC
- Country: US
- Language: English
- Website: www.brides.com

Brides (stylized in all caps) is an American website published by Dotdash Meredith, who purchased the title in 2019. Originally a magazine, Brides is now an online-only publication, with quarterly digital issues.

As with many similar bridal magazines, it was designed to be an in-depth resource for brides-to-be, with many photographs and articles on wedding dresses, cakes, ceremonies, receptions, and honeymoons.

== History ==
In 1934, the name of the magazine was 'So You’re Going to Be Married'. It was later renamed 'The Bride’s Magazine', and then shortened to 'Bride’s'. The apostrophe was eventually dropped and it is now called Brides.

Brides publication was originally owned by Condé Nast, publishers of magazines such as Vogue, Vanity Fair, and The New Yorker.

It was the sister publication of Modern Bride and Elegant Bride magazines, until the demise of those titles in October 2009. Then, the frequency of Brides changed to monthly. The magazine was published monthly until 2013 when the frequency was switched to bimonthly.

A spinoff, Brides Local magazines, began publishing in 2006; these local companion magazines were published and sold in 16 regional areas of the United States. The local magazines were shuttered in 2011.

In May 2019, the magazine was sold to Dotdash Meredith, part of Barry Diller’s IAC Corp, which ceased publication of the print version and began to focus on digital platforms.

== Topics covered ==
Brides online publication contains many topics that are of interest to brides and their bridal party. The magazine contains information on bridal party dresses, bouquets, wedding paperwork, engagement rings, alterations, fitness, budgeting, shoes, cosmetics, hairstyles, fashion accessories, and fashions.
