= Project Catwalk series 1 =

Project Catwalk
- Series 1
- No. of tasks: 10
- No. of contestants: 12
- Winner: Kirsty Doyle
- No. of episodes: 10

Release
- Original network: Sky One
- Original release: January 12 – March 16, 2006

Series chronology
- Next → Series 2

The first series of Project Catwalk premiered on 12 January 2006, featured 12 fashion designers in a competition finding who was the most talented for fashion designers. Elizabeth Hurley was the host of this series and was judged by a panel including designer Julien Macdonald and Elle editor-in-Chief Lorraine Candy. The series narrator was Fiona Allen.

Kirsty Doyle is the winner of the competition. She received a mentorship from Topshop, featured in the British version of Elle and a cash prizes of £20,000 courtesy from Tecni.Art Styling.

== Casts ==
(Ages and names stated are at time of contest)

The 12 fashion designers competing in the first series were:

Contestants	Age	Place finished
Rami Tavakdi	27	12th
Zoe Hamilton-Peters	44	11th
Sushino Techakosit	31	10th
Lesley de Freitas	36	9th
Gemma Carver	23	8th
Shakeel Rabbaney	39	7th
Marianne Fay	22	6th
Renato Termenini	33	5th
Christopher Raeburn	22	4th
Debi Walker	24	3rd
Matthew Bowkett	20	Runner-up
Kirsty Doyle	21	Winner

The 12 models competing for an Elle magazine spread in the first series were:

- Jessica Roffey
- Ana Korzun
- Gemma Chan
- Lynsey Clark
- Kate Mahoney
- Sherene Lawrence
- Erika Lucas
- Lisa
- Caroline Green
- Yvonne Morton
- Kelly
- Charity

Celebrity guests or judges are listed in chronological order:

Episode 1

- Isabella Blow, Fashionista
- Giles Deacon, Fashion Designer

Episode 2

- Frost French
- Sadie Frost
- Jemima French

Episode 3

- Steve Buck, managing director of Barbour

Episode 4

- Kelly Osbourne

Episode 5

- Elizabeth Emanuel

Episode 6

- Robert Cary-Williams

Episode 7

- Giles Deacon, Fashion Designer
- AA Gill, Travel Writer & Food Critic
- Jutta Asta, Executive Housekeeper of the Savoy Hotel Group

Episode 8

- Karen Bonser, Head of Design of Topshop
- Deepi Sekhon, Chief Buyer of Topshop

Episode 9

- Richard Young, Celebrity Photographer
- Georgina Chapman, Fashion Designer
- Keren Craig, Fashion Designer

== Challenges ==
Designer Elimination Progress
Designer	1	2	3	4	5	6	7	8	9	10	Episodes
Kirsty	WIN	HIGH	IN	LOW	IN	HIGH	LOW	LOW	IN	WINNER	10 – Fashion Week (Finale)
Matthew	HIGH	WIN	HIGH	LOW	LOW	IN	WIN	LOW	WIN	RUNNER-UP	10 – Fashion Week (Finale)
Debi	HIGH	LOW	WIN	HIGH	HIGH	LOW	HIGH	HIGH	LOW	3RD PLACE	10 – Fashion Week (Finale)
Christopher	IN	HIGH	IN	LOW	WIN	HIGH	LOW	HIGH	OUT		9 – Design for the Red Carpet
Renato	IN	IN	HIGH	LOW	LOW	WIN	HIGH	OUT			8 – Design a Collection
Marianne	LOW	IN	IN	WIN	IN	LOW	OUT				7 – Savoy Hotel Challenge
Shakeel	IN	LOW	LOW	LOW	HIGH	OUT					6 – Rags to Riches
Gemma	IN	IN	LOW	HIGH	OUT						5 – "Model" Clients
Lesley	IN	IN	IN	OUT							4 – Collaboration
Sushino	HIGH	IN	OUT								3 – Commercial Appeal
Zoe	IN	OUT									2 – Vision
Rami	OUT										1 – Innovation

Green background and WINNER means the challenge won the Project Catwalk.
Red background and OUT means this model wore the losing design in the episode.
Blue background and WIN means this model wore the winning design in the episode.
Light blue background and HIGH means this wore the losing design and was eliminated.
Orange background and LOW means this model was eliminated.
Pink background and LOW means the model was the same eliminated.

Model Elimination Progress
Model	1	2	3	4	5	6	7	8^{1}	9	10
Jessica	IN	IN	IN	IN	WIN	IN	IN	IN	IN	WINNER
Ana	IN	WIN	IN	WIN	IN	IN	IN	IN	WIN	OUT
Gemma	IN	IN	WIN	IN	IN	IN	IN	IN	IN	OUT
Lynsey	WIN	IN	IN	IN	IN	WIN	IN	IN	OUT	
Kate	IN	IN	IN	IN	IN	IN	WIN	OUT		
Sherene	IN	IN	IN	IN	IN	IN	OUT			
Erika	IN	IN	IN	IN	IN	OUT				
Lisa	IN	IN	IN	IN	OUT					
Caroline	IN	IN	IN	OUT						
Yvonne	IN	IN	OUT							
Kelly	IN	OUT								
Charity	OUT									

Yellow background and WINNER means the model won Project Catwalk.
Blue background and WIN means this model wore the winning design in this episode.
Red background and IN means this model wore the losing design in this episode.
Pink background and OUT means this model was eliminated.
Hot pink background and OUT means this model wore the losing design and was eliminated.

== Episodes ==
=== Episode 1: Innovation ===
Original airdate: 12 January, 2006

Designers created a glamorous outfit for a garden party dress made only from materials bought at B&Q Warehouse. They had a budget of £50 and one half hour (30 minutes) to make their purchases. They have two days to complete the design.

- Judges: Giles Deacon, Lorraine Candy, and Isabella Blow.
- Winner: Kirsty
- Out: Rami

=== Episode 2: Vision ===
Original airdate: 19 January, 2006

Designers must build a garment that conveys "frisky". They had a budget of £100 and two days to complete the design.

- Judges: Julien Macdonald, Lorraine Candy, Sadie Frost, and Jemima French
- Winner: Matthew
- Out: Zoe

=== Episode 3: Commercial Appeal ===
Original airdate: 26 January, 2006

Designers created a city women's outfit to fit with Barbour's current line. They had to pick their fabrics at the studios and have 12 hours to complete the designs.

- Judges: Julien Macdonald, Lorraine Candy, and Steve Buck
- Winner: Debi
- Out: Sushino

=== Episode 4: Collaboration ===
Original airdate: 2 February, 2006

- Team Christopher: Kirsty and Shakeel
- Team Marianne: Debi and Gemma
- Team Lesley: Renato and Matthew

The designers created a new look for pop star Kelly Osbourne. But only 3 looks will be chosen to showcase and that 3 designers will each form a team of 3, with them being a lead designer and two assistants. Each team had £300 and 15 hours to complete the design.

- Judges: Julien Macdonald, Lorraine Candy, Patrick Cox, and Kelly Osbourne
- Winner: Marianne
- Out: Lesley

=== Episode 5: "Model" Clients ===
Original airdate: 9 February, 2006

Working with the models that chose them, the designers created a wedding dress for that model. The designers had 20 hours to complete the design.

- Judges: Julien Macdonald, Lorraine Candy, and Elizabeth Emanuel
- Winner: Christopher
- Out: Gemma

=== Episode 6: Rags to Riches ===
Original airdate: 16 February, 2006

This episode's challenge is to design a fabulous outfit for a photoshoot using secondhand clothing from TRAID (Textile Recycling for Aid and International Development). The designers have 10 hours to complete the design.

- Judges: Julien Macdonald, Lorraine Candy, and Robert Cary-Williams
- WINNER: Renato
- Out: Shakeel

=== Episode 7: Savoy Hotel Challenge ===
Original airdate: 23 February, 2006

Designers created a new Room Attendant uniforms for the Housekeepers of the Savoy Hotel. Each designer had a budget of £35 and 18 hours to complete the uniform.

- Judges: Giles Deacon, AA Gill, and Jutta Asta
- Winner: Matthew
- Out: Marianne

=== Episode 8: Design a Collection ===
Original airdate: 2 March, 2006

The designers were asked to work in a team to design a themed capsule collection for Spring/Summer 2006 for Topshop, a store focusing on Women's fashions in the UK. One designer is randomly selected to be Team Leader. The designers have 15 hours to complete the design.

- Judges: Julien Macdonald, Lorraine Candy, Karen Bonser, and Deepi Sekhon
- Winner: None
- Out: Renato

=== Episode 9: Design for the Red Carpet ===
Original airdate: 9 March, 2006

Designers created a dress for the host of Project Catwalk, Elizabeth Hurley, to wear on the red carpet. The designers have £350 and 16 hours to complete the design.

- Judges: Julien Macdonald, Lorraine Candy, Georgina Chapman, and Keren Craig
- Winner: Matthew
- Out: Christopher

=== Episode 10: Fashion Week (Finale) ===
Original airdate: 16 March, 2006

The final three designers, Matthew, Kirsty, and Debi, were visited by Elizabeth Hurley at their homes to show their progress of their collection. The final three are given £4,000, five months, and the assistance of professional pattern cutters and fashion technicians to create their twelve piece collection for a show at London Fashion Week.

- Judges: Julien Macdonald, Lorraine Candy, and Ben de Lisi
- Winner of Project Runway Series 1: Kirsty
- Out: Matthew (1st Runner-Up), Debi (2nd Runner-Up)
