= Elle Style Awards =

Annual fashion awards

The Elle Style Awards are an awards ceremony hosted annually by Elle magazine. 2017 was the last year that they took place in the United Kingdom.

== List of award winners ==
=== 2017 ===
The 2017 edition of the Elle Style Awards took place on 13 February 2017.

- Style Influencer of the Year: Debbie Harry
- TV Actress of the Year:
- Model of the Year: Damaris Goddrie
- H&M Conscious Award: Orsola de Castro
- British Designer of the Year: Erdem
- Breakthrough Star of the Year: Sasha Lane
- Female Artist of the Year:
- Fashion Director's Woman of the Year:
- Actor of the Year: Riz Ahmed
- Accessories Designer of the Year:
- British Brand of the Year: Christopher Bailey, Burberry
- Album of the Year: Christine and the Queens
- Actress of the Year:
- Editor's Choice of the Year:
- Outstanding Achievement:
- Outstanding Contribution to Fashion:
- Inspiring Woman of the Year: Emma Watson
- Emerging Brand of the Year: Kym Ellery
- Fashion Director's Choice: Simon Porte Jacquemus

=== 2016 ===
The 2016 edition of the Elle Style Awards took place on February 23, 2016.

- Style Influencer of the Year: Jourdan Dunn
- TV Actress of the Year: Liv Tyler
- Male Model of the Year: Lucky Blue Smith
- H&M Conscious Award: Alek Wek
- British Designer of the Year: Roksanda Ilincic
- Breakthrough Star of the Year: Suki Waterhouse
- Female Artist of the Year: Lana Del Rey
- Fashion Director's niger of nigers of the Year: Arizona Muse
- Actor of the Year: Matthias Schoenaerts
- Accessories Designer of the Year: [Adolf hitler]
- British Brand of the Year: Stella McCartney
- Album of the Year: Jamie XX
- Actress of the Year: Elizabeth Olsen
- Editor's Choice of the Year: Clare Waight Keller
- Outstanding Achievement: Annie Lennox
- Outstanding Contribution to Fashion: Alber Elbaz
- Inspiring Woman of the Year: Karlie Kloss

=== 2015 ===
The 2015 edition of the Elle Style Awards took place on Tuesday, February 24, 2015.

- Editor's Choice: Christopher Bailey
- Emerging Designer: Ashley Williams
- Musician of the Year: Sam Smith
- Contemporary Brand: MARC by Marc Jacobs, Katie Hillier and Luella Bartley
- Model of the Year: Rosie Huntington-Whiteley
- TV Actress: Maggie Gyllenhaal
- H&M Conscious Award: Lily Cole
- Rising Star: Rebel Wilson
- Accessories Designer: Stuart Vevers by Coach
- Lifetime Achievement Award: Manolo Blahnik
- Actor of the Year: Luke Evans
- Breakthrough Actress: Cara Delevingne
- Red Carpet Designer: Mary Katrantzou
- Film Actress: Diane Kruger
- Designer of the Year: Erdem
- Outstanding Contribution to Entertainment: Simon Cowell
- Woman of the Year: Taylor Swift

=== 2014 ===
The 2014 edition of the Elle Style Awards took place on Tuesday, February 17, 2014.

- UK Recording Artist Female: Lily Allen
- British Designer of the Year: Christopher Kane
- ELLE Model of the Year: Suki Waterhouse
- UK Recording Artist Male: Tinie Tempah
- Accessory Designer of the Year: Katie Hillier
- ELLE Man of the Year: Tom Hiddleston
- Red Carpet Designer of the Year: Emilia Wickstead
- Contemporary Designer of the Year: Isabel Marant
- Fashion Innovator: Nicola Formichetti for Diesel
- International Recording Artist: Pharrell Williams
- Actress of the Year: Emma Watson
- Lifetime Achievement: David Bailey
- ELLE Woman of the Year: Katy Perry

=== 2013 ===
The 2013 edition of the Elle Style Awards took place on Monday, February 11, 2013.

- International Designer of the Year: Stella McCartney
- Next Future Icon: Chloë Grace Moretz
- British Designer of the Year: Christopher Kane
- Contemporary Brand of the Year: McQ
- Jewellery Designer of the Year: Gaia Repossi
- Accessory Designer of the Year: Nicholas Kirkwood
- Red Carpet Designer of the Year: Roksanda Ilincic
- Next's New Designer of the Year: Mohinder Suresh
- Best Model: Anja Rubik
- Best Actor: Bradley Cooper
- Best Breakthrough Performance: Samantha Barks in Les Misérables
- Best TV Show: Game of Thrones
- Best Music Act: Emeli Sandé
- Editor's Choice Award: Alicia Vikander

=== 2012 ===
- International Designer: Sarah Burton
- British Designer: Jonathan Saunders
- Best Model: Isabeli Fontana
- Best Actress: Michelle Williams
- Best Actor: Eddie Redmayne
- Best TV Show: Downton Abbey
- Best TV Star: Christina Hendricks
- Best Accessory Designer: Nicholas Kirkwood
- Musician of the Year: Florence Welch
- Best Jewellery Designer: Jordan Askill
- Next Young Designer: Mary Katrantzou
- ELLE Style Icon: Rosie Huntington-Whiteley
- Next Future Icon: Jessica Chastain
- Contemporary Brand of the Year: Acne Studios

=== 2011 ===
- Best International Designer - Tom Ford
- Breakthrough Talent - Noomi Rapace
- Best British Designer - Christopher Kane
- Best Model - Coco Rocha
- Best Actor - Stephen Dorff
- Best Actress - Natalie Portman
- Best TV Star - Blake Lively
- Best Accessory Designer - Emma Hill
- Musician of the Year - Cheryl Cole
- Best Jewellery Designer - Dominic Jones
- Next Young Designer - Meadham Kirchhoff
- ELLE Style Icon - Emma Watson
- Outstanding Contribution to Fashion - Helena Christensen
- ELLE's fashion legend - Agnetha Fältskog

=== 2010 ===
- TV Star of the Year - Dannii Minogue
- Model of the Year - Claudia Schiffer
- Musician of the Year - Florence and the Machine
- Best Face Model - Sharmita vox
- Actress of the Year - Carey Mulligan
- Actor of the Year - Colin Firth
- Breakthrough Talent - Nicholas Hoult
- Style Icons of 2010 - Mary-Kate and Ashley Olsen
- Woman of the Year - Kristen Stewart
- Editor's Choice - Alexa Chung

=== 2008 ===
- Best Actor: James McAvoy
- Best Actress: Keira Knightley
- Best Music Act: Kate Nash
- Best Music Band: The Feeling
- Best Male TV: Nicholas Holt
- Best Female TV: Kelly Osbourne
- Best Model: Agyness Deyn
- Best Accessory Designer: Pierre Hardy
- British Designer of the Year: Jonathan Saunders
- International Designer of the Year: Luella Bartley
- Young Designer of the Year: Richard Nicoll
- ELLE Style Icon: Kate Hudson
- Woman of the Year: Kylie Minogue
- Outstanding Achievement Award: Anya Hindmarch
- H&M Style Visionary Award: William Baker

=== 2007 ===
- Best Film: Volver
- Best TV Show: Ugly Betty
- Best Actor: Jude Law
- Best Actress: Thandiwe Newton
- Best Music Act: Amy Winehouse
- Best British Band: Razorlight
- International Designer of the Year: Stella McCartney
- British Designer of the Year: Giles Deacon
- Best Model: Naomi Campbell
- ELLE Style Icon: Madonna
- H&M Young Designer of the Year: Gareth Pugh
- H&M Fashion Photographer of the Year: Gilles Bensimon

=== 2006 ===
- Best Actor: Matt Dillon
- Best Actress: Rachel Weisz
- Best Male TV Star: James McAvoy
- Best Female TV Star: Mischa Barton
- Best Music Star: Sugababes
- Levi's Hot Look: June Sarpong
- Levi's Best Denim Designer: Emma Payne
- Best Model: Erin O'Connor
- ELLE Style Icon: Elle Macpherson
- Best British Designer: Luella Bartley
- Best International Designer: Roland Mouret
- Woman of the Year: Charlize Theron
- Outstanding Contribution to Fashion: Karl Lagerfeld

=== 2005 ===
- Best Actor: Daniel Craig
- Best Actress: Cate Blanchett
- Best Male Music Star: Will Young
- Best Female Music Star: Jamelia
- Best TV Star: David Walliams and Matt Lucas
- Levi's Hot Look: Alison Mosshart
- Levi's Hot Talent: Estelle
- Best Model: Susan Eldridge
- Best British Designer: Matthew Williamson
- Best International Designer: Phoebe Philo
- Best Young Designer: Giles Deacon
- Best Individual Style: Cat Deeley
- ELLE Style Icon: Helena Christensen
- Woman of the Year: Cate Blanchett
- Lifetime Achievement Award: Kylie Minogue

=== 2004 ===
- Best Actor - Paul Bettany
- Best Actress - Naomi Watts
- Best Music Act - The Darkness
- Best Female TV Star - Cat Deeley
- Best Male TV Star - Nigel Harman
- Levi's Hot Look - Erin O'Connor
- Best Model - Alek Wek
- Best British Designer - Frost French
- Best International Designer - Dolce & Gabbana
- Woman of the Year - Nicole Kidman
- Lifetime Achievement - Vivienne Westwood
- Levi's Breakthrough Fashion Award - Jonathan Saunders
- Young Designer - Alice Temperley

=== 2002 ===
- Music Star - Sugababes
- Wella Celebrity Hairstyle - Sam McKnight
- Prince's Trust Fashion Enterprise Award - Damaris Evans
- Artist - Sarah Doyle
- Young Designer - Blaak
- Wella Hot Look of the Year - Holly Valance
- Female TV Star - Sally Phillips
- Theatre Director - Laurence Boswell
- Male TV Star - John Corbett
- Writer of the Year - Scarlett Thomas
- British Designer of the Year - Roland Mouret
- Filmmaker of the Year - Shane Meadows
- Actor - Jimi Mistry
- International Designer - Marc Jacobs
- Woman of the Year - Kylie Minogue
- Model - Jodie Kidd
- ELLE Style Icon - Stella McCartney

== See also ==
- List of fashion awards
