= Project Catwalk series 2 =

Project Catwalk
- Series 2
- No. of tasks: 10
- No. of contestants: 12
- Winner: Wayne Aveline
- No. of episodes: 10

Release
- Original network: Sky One
- Original release: January 8 – March 19, 2007

Series chronology
- ← Previous; Series 1 Next → Series 3

The second series of Project Catwalk premiered on 8 January 2007 on Sky One, featured 12 fashion designers in a competition finding who was the most talented for fashion designers. Kelly Osbourne replaced Elizabeth Hurley as the host of this series and was judged by a panel including designer Julien Macdonald and Grazia editor-in-Chief Paula Reed.

Wayne Aveline is the winner of the competition. He received a cash prizes of £20,000, featured in the British version of Grazia and a chance to create his own lines at Designers At Debenhams.

== Casts ==
(Ages and names stated are at time of contest)

The 12 fashion designers competing in the second series were:

Contestants	Age	Place finished
Christine Newman	21	12th
Tymoor Gharbo	22	11th
Grant Lilley	23	10th
Henry James Blogg	22	9th
Tyla Schneider	25	8th
Luisa Fici	22	7th
Fatz Kassim	31	6th
Shawla Ahad	31	5th
Giles Pearson	28	4th
Luke Youngblood	20	3rd
Monika Patrycja Rene	28	Runner-up
Wayne Aveline	33	Winner

The 12 models competing for an Grazia magazine spread in the second series were:

- Betsie Dsane
- Dasha Zeromska
- Erica Harrison
- Gabriella Riggon
- Khiara Parker
- Liana Goss
- Mary (Voluntarily left, ep.2)
- Nicola Vernon
- Rachel Ritfeld
- Ruth Waterfall-Brown
- Sally Kettle (Eliminated, ep.2 but then replaced Mary)
- Simona Ehmann-Swims

== Challenges ==
Designer Elimination Progress
Designer	1	2	3	4	5	6	7	8	9	10
Wayne	WIN	LOW	LOW	IN	IN	WIN	LOW	LOW	HIGH	WINNER
Monika	HIGH	LOW	LOW	WIN	WIN	IN	HIGH	LOW	WIN	RUNNER-UP
Luke	IN	IN	HIGH	LOW	HIGH	LOW	WIN	WIN	LOW	3RD PLACE
Giles	IN	IN	IN	HIGH	IN	IN	HIGH	LOW	OUT	
Shawla	IN	IN	IN	IN	LOW	IN	HIGH	OUT		
Fatz	IN	WIN	WIN	LOW	IN	LOW	OUT			
Luisa	IN	HIGH	IN	IN	LOW	OUT				
Tyla	LOW	IN	IN	LOW	OUT					
Henry	IN	IN	LOW	OUT						
Grant	LOW	LOW	OUT							
Tymoor	LOW	OUT								
Christine	OUT									

Green background and WINNER means the overall winner.
Blue background and WIN means the designer won that challenge.
Red background and OUT means the designer lost and was out of the competition.
Light blue background and HIGH means the designer had one of the highest scores for that challenge.
Pink background and LOW means the designer had one of the lowest scores for that challenge.
Orange background and LOW means the designer had the second lowest score for that challenge.
