= Project Catwalk series 3 =

Project Catwalk
- Series 3
- No. of tasks: 10
- No. of contestants: 13
- Winner: Jasper Garvida
- No. of episodes: 10

Release
- Original network: Sky One
- Original release: 9 January – 19 March 2008

Series chronology
- ← Previous; Series 2

The third series of Project Catwalk premiered on 9 January 2008, featured 13 fashion designers in a competition finding who was the most talented for fashion designers. Kelly Osbourne continue her role as the host of this series and was judged by a panel including fashion stylist Nick Ede and Grazia editor-in-Chief Paula Reed.

Jasper Garvida is the winner of the competition. He received a cash prizes of £25,000, a full feature fashion spread in the British version of Grazia of and a chance to create his own lines at Oli.co.uk.

== Casts ==
(Ages and names stated are at time of contest)

The 13 fashion designers competing in the first series were:

Designer	Age	Finish
James Gardner	21	13th
Keko Hainswheeler	26	12th
Julie-Ann "Jules" Murray	27	11th
Deborah "Debbie" Debonair	38	10th
Angie Morris-Winmill	37	9th
Fionnuala Bourke	23	8th
Tom Lipop	22	7th
Clinton Lotter	35	6th
Katy O'Grady	23	5th
Ross Hancock	31	4th
Vivienne "Viv" Farrell Whelan	42	3rd
Chelsey Christine Oliver	21	Runner-up
Jasper Garvida	30	Winner

The 13 models competing for an Grazia magazine spread in the first series were:

- Akos Asumadu-Sakyi
- Ashley
- Gemma
- Jo Lawden
- Kristina Lomax
- Lezel
- Lynda Murray
- Rachel Ritfeld
- Sammy Bennett
- Sarah Butler
- Tanita Baptiste
- Xenia
- Tash Wilson

== Designer progress ==
Designer Elimination Progress
Designer	1	2	3	4	5	6	7	8 (Note: In Episode 8, no contestants were eliminated as the judges decided to keep Viv and Ross remains. As the result, two designers will be eliminated in the next episode.)	9	10	Task
Jasper	HIGH	WIN	LOW	IN	HIGH	WIN	HIGH	IN	LOW	WINNER	10 – London Fashion Week Finale
Chelsey	IN	WIN	HIGH	IN	IN	IN	WIN	IN	WIN	RUNNER-UP	10 – London Fashion Week Finale
Viv	HIGH	HIGH	HIGH	WIN	IN	LOW	LOW	LOW	HIGH	3RD PLACE	10 – London Fashion Week Finale
Ross	WIN	HIGH	WIN	LOW	IN	IN	LOW	LOW	OUT		9 – Kelly Osbourne Dress Challenge
Katy	IN	LOW	WIN	IN	LOW	HIGH	LOW	WIN	OUT		8 – Airline Challenge
Clinton	IN	LOW	IN	WIN	LOW	LOW	OUT				7 – Show Stopper
Tom	LOW	HIGH	IN	LOW	WIN	OUT					6 – A Fashionable Cause
Fionnuala	LOW	HIGH	IN	IN	OUT						5 – Fashion Future
Angie	HIGH	LOW	LOW	OUT							4 – Fireworks with Firetrap
Debbie	IN	LOW (Note: Even though she was on a low scoring team, Debbie received positive critiques from the judges.)	OUT								3 – Mac Daddy
Jules	IN	OUT									2 – Re-Designing Nancy
Keko	IN	OUT									2 – Re-Designing Nancy
James	OUT										1 – A Catfight on the Catwalk

Green background and WINNER means the designer won the competition
Blue background and WIN means the designer won that challenge.
Red background and OUT means the designer lost and was out of the competition.
Turquoise background and HIGH means the designer was either in the top two, or first announced to be in the top for that challenge.
Light blue background and HIGH means the designer had one of the highest scores for that challenge.
Pink background and LOW means the designer had one of the lowest scores for that challenge.
Orange background and LOW means the designer had the second lowest score for that challenge.

== Episodes ==
=== Episode 1: A Catfight on the Catwalk ===
Original airdate: 9 January 2008

The designers had to create an outfit that reflected their personalities. However, the only fabrics they had access to for the task would be garments from each others wardrobes.

- Guest Judge: Zandra Rhodes
- Winner: Ross
- Out: James

=== Episode 2: Re-Designing Nancy ===
Original airdate: 16 January 2008

The designers had to create a dress for Nancy Dell'Olio to get her from the worst dressed list to the best dressed list. They have to work in teams of two. This week there would be a double elimination.

The Teams were:

- Viv with Fionnuala
- Katy with Angie
- Clinton with Keko
- Jules with Debbie
- Jasper with Chelsey
- Ross with Tom
- Guest Judge: Nancy Dell'Olio
- Winner: Jasper and Chelsey
- Out: Jules and Keko

=== Episode 3: Mac Daddy ===
Original airdate: 23 January 2008

The designers had to re-invent the Macintosh. Half of the group design womenswear, the other half design menswear.

- Guest Judge: Gary Bott
- Winner: Katy and Ross
- Out: Debbie

=== Episode 4: Fireworks With Firetrap ===
Original airdate: 30 January 2008

The designers had to work in teams of three to create a capture collection for a Firetrap customer shopping for a music festival.

The Teams were:

- Fionnuala with Jasper and Angie
- Viv with Ross and Chelsey
- Katy with Clinton and Tom
- Guest Judge: Sophie Clinch
- Winner: Viv and Clinton
- Out: Angie

=== Episode 5: Fashion Future ===
Original airdate: 6 February 2008

The designers use vintage clothing as material to create new trend setting looks.

- Guest Judge: Henry Holland
- Winner: Tom
- Out: Fionnuala

=== Episode 6: A Fashionable Cause ===
Original airdate: 13 February 2008

The designers designed a shirt for the "Fashion Targets Breast Cancer" charity incorporating the charity's signature target logo (consisting of a variety of blue rings).

- Guest Judge: Vanja Strok
- Winner: Jasper
- Out: Tom

=== Episode 7: Show Stopper ===
Original airdate: 27 February 2008

The designers make a stage costume for a pop star Sophie Ellis-Bextor.

- Guest Judge: Sophie Ellis-Bextor
- Winner: Chelsey
- Out: Clinton

=== Episode 8: Airline Challenge ===
Original airdate: 5 March 2008

The designers make an airline flight attendant uniform for Flybe.

- Guest Judge: Niall Duffy
- Winner: Katy
- Out: None

=== Episode 9: Kelly Osbourne Dress Challenge ===
Original airdate: 12 March 2008

The designers create an evening-gown for Kelly Osbourne.

- Guest Judge: Jade Bien-Aimee Sutherland
- Winner: Chelsey
- Out: Ross and Katy
- Note: This episode was dedicated to the guest judge Jade Bien-Aimee Sutherland, the former stylist to Naomi Campbell, who committed suicide in December 2007 by jumping off Albert Bridge in London.

=== Episode 10: Finale ===
Original airdate: 19 March 2008

In the final episode of the series, Viv, Chelsey and Japser must produce and showcased their twelve piece collections to exhibit at London Fashion Week. Viv's was inspired by the British seaside town of Whitby, Chelsey's by Venice, and Jasper's by Salvador Dalí's surrealist castle.

- Winner of Project Runway Series 3: Jasper
- Out: Chelsey (1st Runner-Up), Viv (2nd Runner-Up)
