= Kim West =

British fashion designer

- Born: 1959 (age 66–67); Gloucester, England
- Occupation: Fashion designer
- Known for: Bringing latex into mainstream fashion
- Spouse: Adam Boome
- Children: 2
- Website: http://www.kimwest.co.uk

Kim Elizabeth Boome (4 February 1959 – 21 September 2022), known professionally as Kim West, was a cult British fashion designer who worked mostly in latex. She was one of the first designers to bring latex into mainstream fashion.

== Early life ==
Although having no formal training in fashion, West had designed clothes for herself from an early age. When she made a dress out of latex in 1984, it received so much attention that she began making it for others.

== Fashion ==
Her designs found early success with such notables as Adam Ant, Samantha Fox and Tony James, but she wanted to reach ordinary women. In 1986 her latex cowgirl dress made the front cover of the Telegraph magazine. However, the association of latex with fetish was too much for many of the Telegraph's readers, and the cover prompted a flurry of complaints. A later photoshoot for the Tatler even prompted a complaint from Cardinal Basil Hume.

In 1987 West opened her first shop in Kensington Market. By then her clothes were appearing regularly in publications such as ID, 19, Company, Sky Magazine, Honey, and Sunday Mirror Magazine. Although gaining acceptability, latex was still controversial enough to warrant comments in the press such as "Kim has even sold an outfit to Kylie 'pure-as-the-driven-snow' Minogue". The battle to get into the mainstream was helped when designs were worn by establishment celebrities such as Janet Street-Porter, swimmer Sharron Davies, Helena Bonham Carter, and Isabella Rossellini. They were seen in films such as Mona Lisa. Oscar-winning costume designer Sandy Powell used her clothes for avant garde dance groups the Cholmondeleys and Featherstonehaughs.

West was the first designer to print onto latex, an expensive and difficult process due to the elasticity of rubber.

In 1988, she went into partnership with Jessamy Calkin, opening the shop Heels of London, which sold shoes to the likes of Madonna. She also made clothes for designer Vivienne Westwood.

== Television ==
In 1992 West closed down Kim West Clothing in order to make a controversial documentary for Channel 4. The Sex Hunters depicted the "new lad" in a way which had never been shown on television. The subject of the documentary was quoted as saying: "In the weeks before the documentary I began to get worried we were going to get lynched... The day after [transmission] we went to London, the reaction was just incredible, people were stopping us in the street."

== Personal life ==
In 1994 West moved to Los Angeles. She returned to London in 2000.

== Re-launch ==
In 2009, Kim West Clothing was re-launched on the internet. By this time latex was considered more acceptable, and prompted no complaints when the story was picked up by the Telegraph: "THE LATEX NEWS Twenty-five years after she pioneered the idea, Kim West is launching a new collection of latex clothing for the discerning female."

In 1992 West was asked by Jonathan Ross in a television interview if women would be wearing latex to the supermarket by the time she was 60. She replied confidently, "Absolutely." She remains the only designer to be making predominantly latex clothing which can be worn in everyday situations.
