= Kelly Osbourne =

English television personality (born 1984)

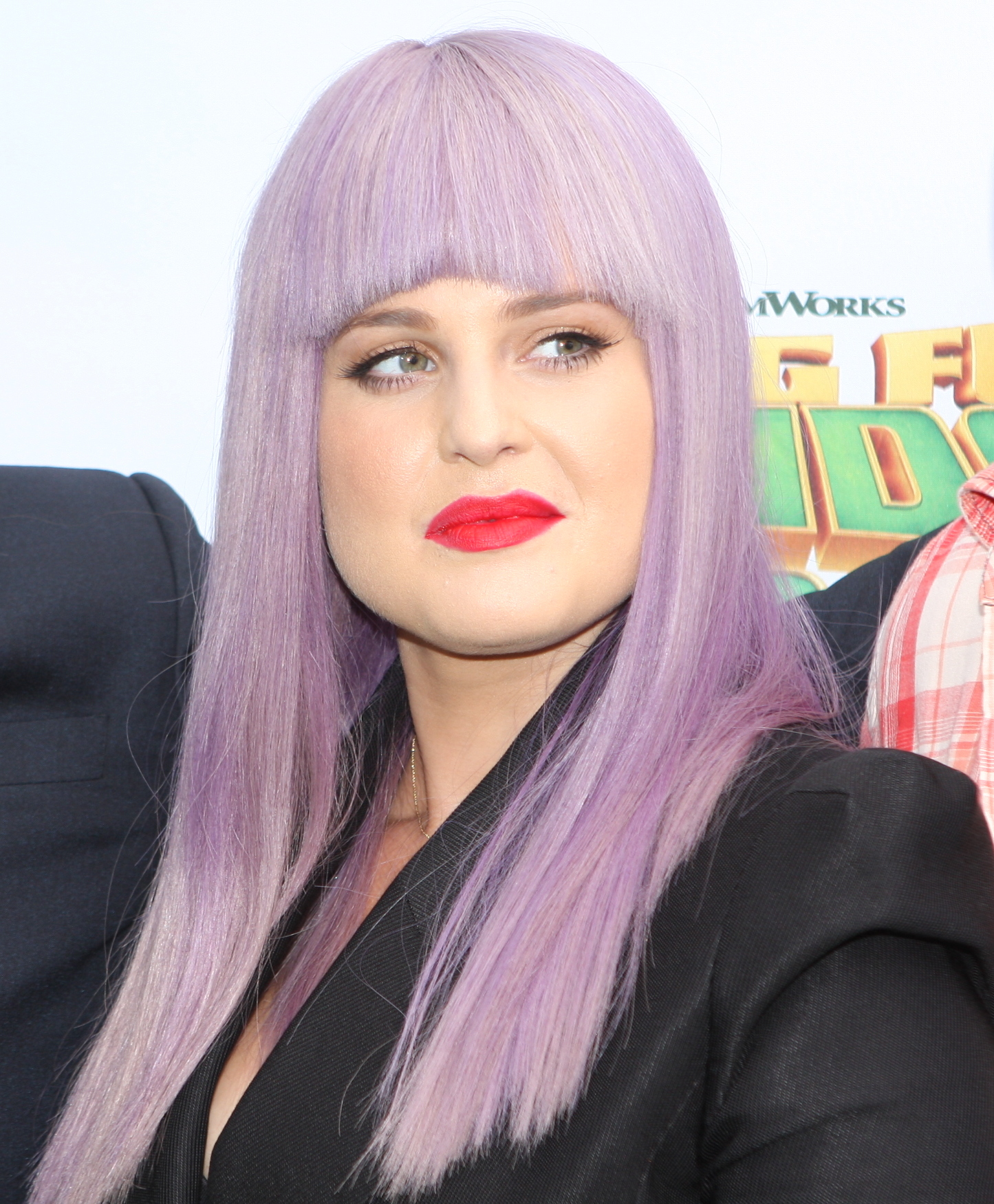
- Osbourne in 2016
- Born: Kelly Michelle Lee Osbourne; 27 October 1984 (age 42); Westminster, London, England
- Occupations: Television personality; singer; actress; fashion designer
- Years active: 1991–present
- Partner: Sid Wilson (2022–2026)
- Children: 1
- Parents: Ozzy Osbourne (father); Sharon Osbourne (mother)
- Relatives: Aimee Osbourne (sister); Jack Osbourne (brother); Don Arden (maternal grandfather)
- Musical career
- Genres: Pop-punk; synth-pop
- Instruments: Vocals; guitar
- Labels: Epic; Sanctuary; Universal
- Website: kellyosbourne.net

Kelly Michelle Lee Osbourne (born 27 October 1984) is an English television personality, singer, actress, and fashion designer. She came to prominence while appearing on the reality show The Osbournes (2002–2005) with her family, which won a 2002 Emmy Award for Outstanding Reality Program. She is the daughter of late heavy-metal musician Ozzy Osbourne and television personality Sharon Osbourne.

Osbourne's television work includes hosting Project Catwalk (2007–2008) and Fashion Police (2010–2015), competing on the ninth season of Dancing with the Stars (2009), and judging on Project Runway Junior (2015–2017) and Australia's Got Talent (2016). She played the voice role of Hildy Gloom in the Disney XD animated series The 7D (2014–2016).

As a singer, Osbourne has released two studio albums: Shut Up (2002) and Sleeping in the Nothing (2005). In 2003, she collaborated with her father Ozzy (Osbourne) on the single "Changes" (a Black Sabbath song) which reached number one on the UK Singles Chart.

== Early life ==
Kelly Michelle Lee Osbourne was born on 27 October 1984 at Portland Hospital in Westminster, London, to Sharon Osbourne (née Levy) and Ozzy Osbourne. She has an older sister, Aimee, and a younger brother, Jack. From Ozzy's first marriage, she also has two half-siblings. She had an unofficially "adopted" brother, Robert Marcato, whom Sharon and Ozzy took in after Marcato's mother died. Osbourne spent much of her childhood travelling with her father on tour and lived in more than 20 homes across both the United Kingdom and the United States. Her maternal grandfather was Don Arden (born Harry Levy), an English music manager. Her mother is of Irish and Jewish descent.

Osbourne attended several private schools in England, including Pipers Corner School.

== Career ==
=== 2002–2005: The Osbournes and Shut Up ===
Osbourne and the rest of her family (minus Aimee) starred on the MTV reality show The Osbournes, which aired from 2002 to 2005. The series chronicled their day-to-day life, portraying an unconventional family. Kelly, the middle child, emerged (according to Rolling Stone) as "a wickedly funny, brutally honest, pint-size, potty-mouthed spitfire." The series started when she was seventeen, and ended when she was twenty. Kelly said in an interview for The Osbournes DVD that the crew were only actually supposed to be there for a few weeks but ended up staying for a few months. She found the constant cameras focusing on her and her family stressful. In 2002, during the second season of The Osbournes, Kelly dated The Used lead singer Bert McCracken. The show was filmed in California, United States, where the family has had their residence for several decades.

Both she and her family were parodied in Channel 4 comedy Bo' Selecta in which the rubber-masked Kelly, played by Leigh Francis, has her own show and is always being censored for swearing with bleeps. After her appearance on the reality show, Osbourne quickly began to be noted for her varied and trendy style among fashion commentators like Steven Cojocaru. In 2004, Osbourne launched her own fashion line, Stiletto Killers, with her friend and former sponsor, Ali Barone. Stiletto Killers was a rock-inspired line of tees, knickers, hoodies and sweatpants designed by Osbourne and Barone, emblazoned with cartoonish designs and punk rock phrases. There was also a more sophisticated couture branch, the SK Collection. Stiletto Killers closed in April 2006.

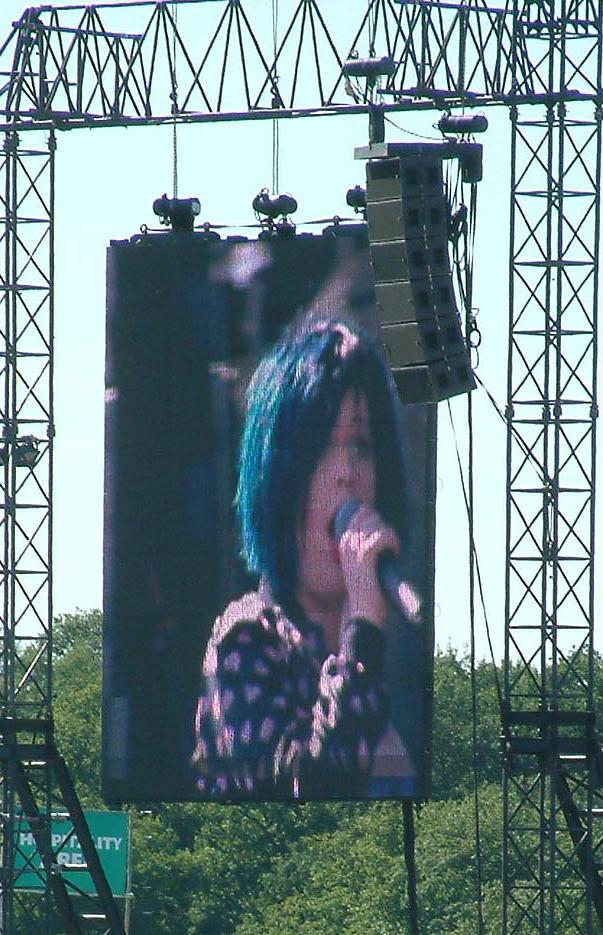
Osbourne in concert in 2003

Her debut album, Shut Up, was released by Epic Records in 2002 to moderate US sales, but good European sales. The lead single, a cover of Madonna's "Papa Don't Preach", debuted with Houston rock band Pure Rubbish at the 2002 MTV Film Awards. The album, which debuted at No. 1 on Billboard's Heatseekers chart, was met with mixed critical reviews and, by May 2003, Osbourne was dropped from Epic Records. By autumn she was on the Sanctuary label, later recording a duet of "Changes" (a Black Sabbath song) with her father.

The duet reached No 1 in the UK charts, which resulted in a reissue of Shut Up, titled Changes. "Changes" was one of a few tracks to have fallen down the charts (from 1–3) while selling more copies than the week it reached number 1. Osbourne was the first artist to top all three of the Billboard charts dance surveys in the same week with the "Chris Cox Club Remix" of "One Word". Her second album Sleeping in the Nothing was not without controversy, due to its reportedly heavily altered album cover, in which Osbourne appeared slimmer, despite her previous assertions of being happy with her size.

Osbourne made her debut as an actress with a starring role on 7 October 2004 on the ABC high school teenage drama Life as We Know It, where she played the supporting role of Deborah Beatrice Tynan. During an interview in late 2005, Osbourne denied reports she was ending her music career, saying: "I don't know where the quit rumours came from – I've just recorded a version of 'Girls Just Want to Have Fun' with Cyndi Lauper." Despite this, Osbourne's third studio album titled Miss Kelly Kelly: The Osbourne Boombox was shelved in late 2006 ahead of its official release. Reflecting on this period in her career during a 2024 episode of The Osbournes Podcast, Kelly expressed that, "I've definitely thought about it and what life would have been like if I hadn't stopped. It's definitely a regret. Will I do anything about that regret? I don't know."

On 2 April 2004, Osbourne entered the Malibu rehab facility Promises after admitting that she was addicted to painkillers. Over a year later, on 2 June, she checked into Las Encinas Hospital, a drug treatment centre in Pasadena, California, after a relapse. She entered another drug treatment facility in January 2009; she stayed for a month and later acknowledged that she had a relapse of her painkiller addiction. After 30 days, she was released; she has been quoted as saying that this was the first time she really thought rehab had helped her.

=== 2006–2009: Acting, hosting duties, and Dancing with the Stars ===
In spring 2006, Osbourne modelled for Heatherette in a catwalk show. In June, she played the role of Wendy from Peter Pan in The Queen's Handbag and provided her voice for the animated film Live Freaky Die Freaky. Later that year, she became the face of the high street chain Accessorize. Osbourne co-hosted the 2006 edition of I'm a Celebrity...Get Me Out of Here! NOW!, a spin-off show of the main ITV programme. She hosted alongside Jeff Brazier in Australia, and Mark Durden-Smith in the London studio.

Her one-off gigs include the 2002 MTV Film Awards, Top of the Pops Saturday, MTV's Isle of MTV, MTV UK and Ireland's red carpet coverage of the 2003 MTV Europe Music Awards, Popworld, The Sunday Night Project, the 2005 MTV Australia Video Music Awards and Zane Lowe's BBC Radio 1 show. In spring 2006, Osbourne was one of the judges on Making Your Mind Up. At the September 2006 Electric Picnic festival in Ireland, Osbourne and her boyfriend, Matty Derham of the band Fields, held a wedding ceremony. Her representative later denied that the ceremony was legally binding because it did not meet Irish legal requirements, as at that time in Ireland, a couple couldn't get married in an outdoor venue. She later went on to date Matt Walker, a promoter and tour manager.

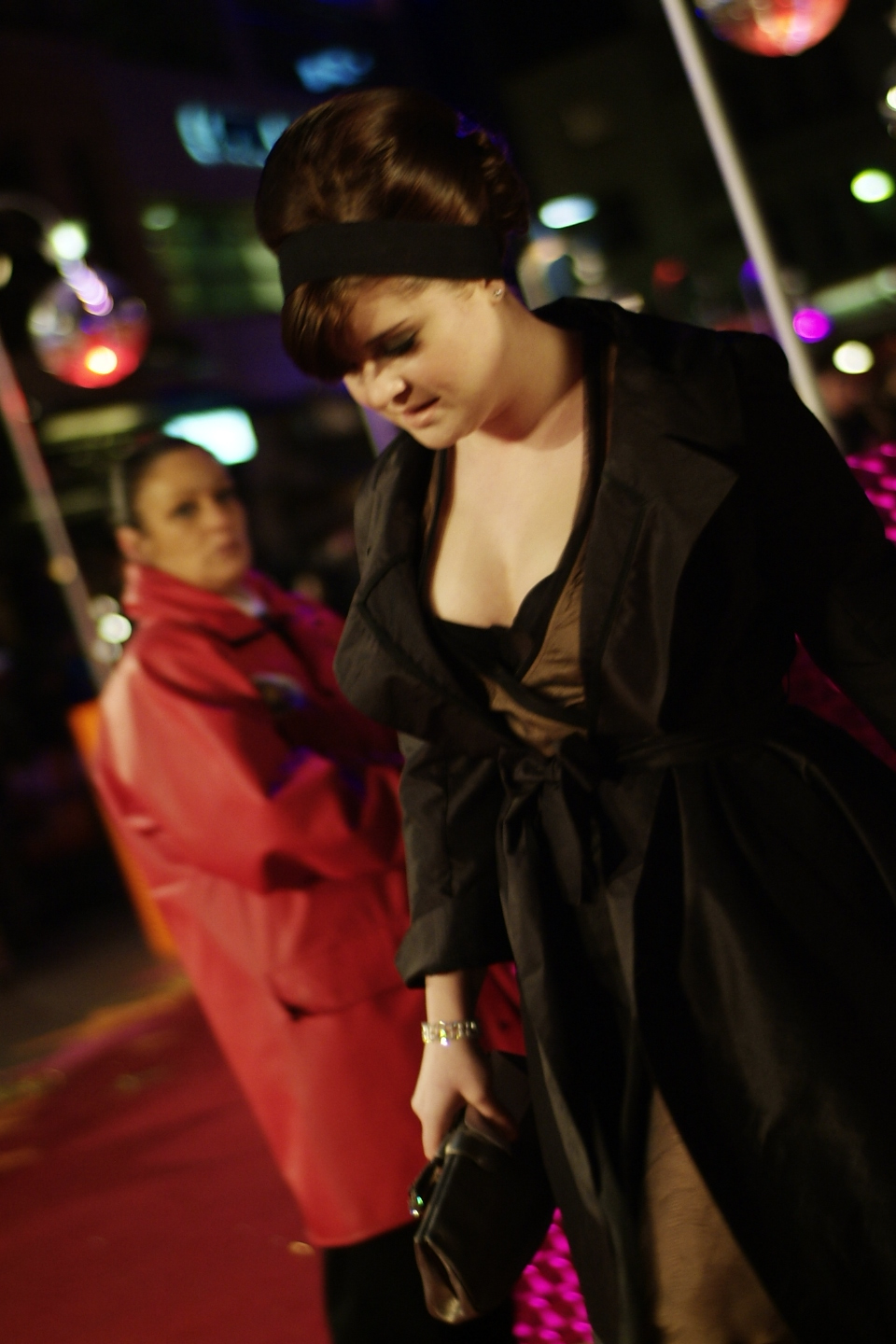
Osbourne at the premiere of the film Dreamgirls in 2007

In February 2006, Osbourne was a guest judge for the Season One Episode Four of Project Catwalk on Sky1. She went on to host Seasons Two and Three of Project Catwalk in 2007 and 2008 respectively. In July 2007, Osbourne portrayed the role of prison matron Mama Morton in the musical drama Chicago for seven weeks at the Cambridge Theatre. In autumn 2007, Osbourne signed to BBC Radio 1 to host the Sunday night show, The Surgery. On 7 October 2007, she went on air for the first time with the issue of self-harm. She was scheduled to return to the show in early 2009 and while she was away, Aled Haydn Jones from The Chris Moyles Show presented the show. Aled subsequently became the full-time presenter.

In 2008, she featured in the short musical film The Town that Boars Me by photographer Ben Charles Edwards. The film also features Sadie Frost, Jodie Harsh, Sophie Ellis-Bextor, and Zandra Rhodes, among others. The film debuted in late summer at the Portobello Film Festival. In 2009, she appeared in an episode of Hotel Babylon, a British TV show aired on BBC One. She played Jo, a character very similar to herself.

On 19 January 2009, Osbourne was arrested for assault after allegedly slapping Daily Mirror columnist Zoe Griffin at a club in August 2008 after Griffin wrote a story that mocked Osbourne's then-boyfriend, Luke Worrall. In March 2009, Osbourne and Worrall were engaged, but later separated in July 2010 after he had an affair with model Elle Schneider. Osbourne presented ITV2's coverage of the National Television Awards with her brother Jack, and a documentary on Japanese pop culture called Kelly Osbourne: Turning Japanese for the same channel. In March 2009, Osbourne returned to television with the rest of the Osbourne family on Osbournes: Reloaded. On 1 September 2009, Osbourne released her first autobiography, Fierce, via Virgin Books. The book contains autobiographical elements, as well as advice and guidance through tough periods.

In September 2009, she started writing a weekly column giving advice and celebrity gossip in the British magazine Closer.

On 17 August 2009, co-hosts Tom Bergeron and Samantha Harris announced the cast of stars for the 2009 autumn series of Dancing with the Stars. Osbourne was to be one of the 16 celebrity contestants. A week later, her professional partner was announced: Dutch ballroom champion Louis van Amstel. The competition, starting 21 September 2009, entailed 10 weeks of training and dancing. On 17 November 2009, the final three were announced: Osbourne, singer Mýa and pop singer Donny Osmond. In the final, Osbourne and her partner placed third.

=== 2010–2025: Fashion Police and other endeavours ===
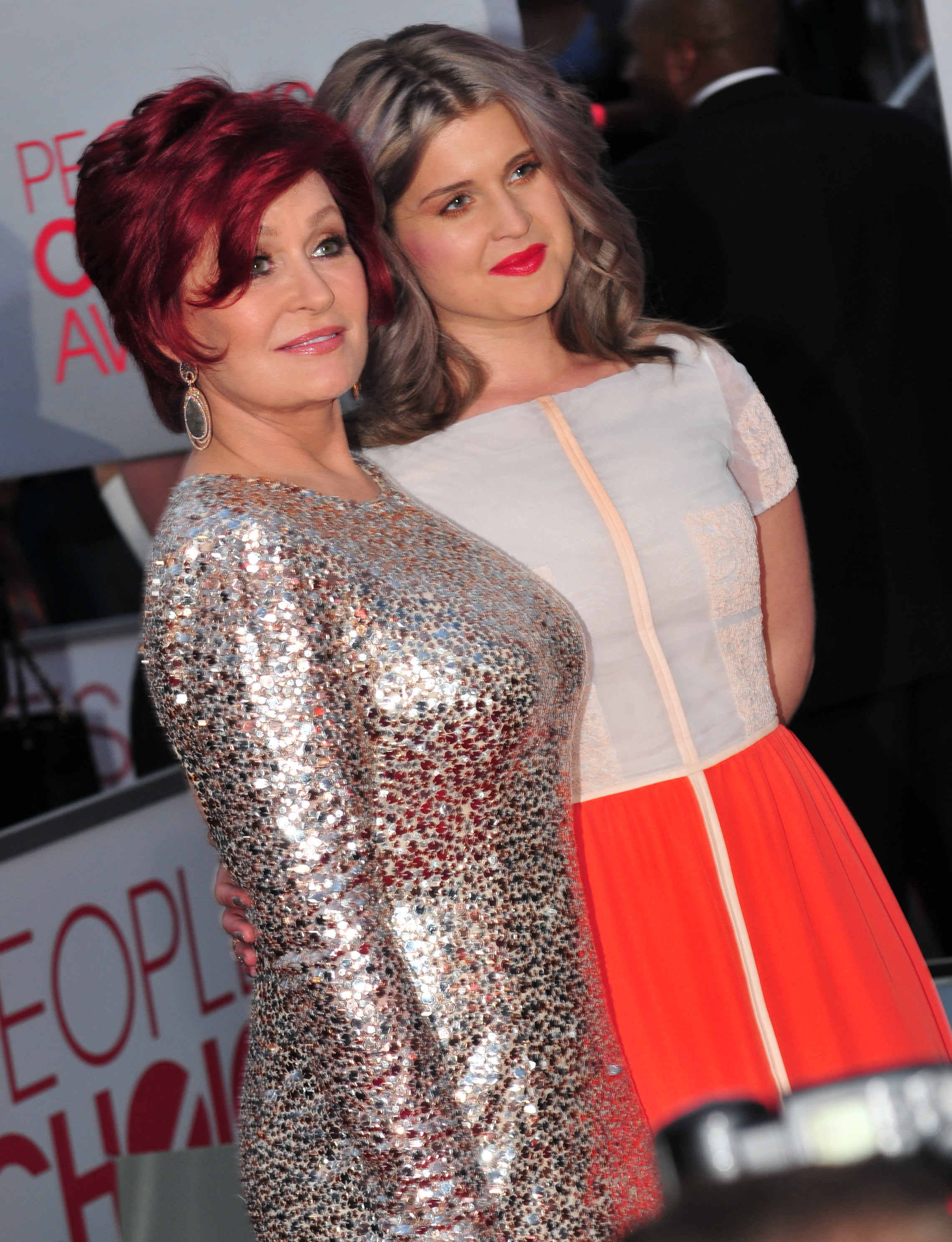
Osbourne with her mother Sharon in 2012

In August 2010, Osbourne began filming the comedy Should've Been Romeo, her first major Hollywood role, in which she played Nicole, a fun-loving groupie. The film was released in the US on 28 April 2012. In December 2010, it was confirmed that she would appear alongside Disney star Miley Cyrus in So Undercover, playing one of Cyrus' sorority sisters. Filming began later that month, and the film was released on 6 December 2012.

In 2010, she modelled a Chris Benz dress for Naomi Campbell's Fashion For Relief runway show, held in support of the White Ribbon Alliance to raise funds for mothers in Haiti. In 2011, Osbourne became a fashion correspondent for the cable network E!, serving as a co-host, with Joan Rivers, on the series Fashion Police. In June 2011, Osbourne co-hosted the Miss USA pageant at the Planet Hollywood Resort and Casino in Las Vegas with Susie Castillo.

In 2012, she appeared as a guest judge in season 4 of RuPaul's Drag Race, and hosted the New Now Next Awards. In September 2012, US rapper Lil' Kim confirmed she and Osbourne were to join forces for a rock-rap cover of Elton John's 1974 hit "The Bitch Is Back". In 2013, Osbourne walked the runway for The Heart Truth Red Dress Fashion Show. On 7 March 2013, while filming an episode of Fashion Police with guest Melissa Rivers, Osbourne collapsed and began experiencing a seizure that reportedly lasted thirty seconds, after which she was taken to a local Los Angeles hospital for testing.

In August 2013, Osbourne was a guest judge on the 12th season of Project Runway. She was a guest judge on the October 2014 premiere episode of Project Runway: Threads. She is a regular judge on Project Runway: Junior. In February 2015, Osbourne exited Fashion Police after complaints about her co-host's comments on the show.

In August 2015, Osbourne garnered controversy while discussing Donald Trump's immigration policy on The View. Osbourne said, to backlash from the show's co-hosts, "If you kick every Latino out of this country, then who is going to be cleaning your toilet, Donald Trump?" Osbourne soon backtracked on this statement, which was widely condemned as racist, and later apologised on Twitter. Her comments on the show later became a widespread TikTok meme in 2024, prompting Osbourne to recall the incident in an interview with Rolling Stone as "the most cringe moment of [her] entire life" and "the worst thing [she's] ever done."

On 28 October 2015, it was confirmed that Osbourne would replace Dawn French as a judge on Australia's Got Talent for its eighth season on Channel Nine. In 2018, Osbourne joined her father and brother in their televised global tour that is documented in the series Ozzy & Jack's World Detour. On 13 November 2019, Osbourne competed in season two of The Masked Singer as "Ladybug".

=== 2025–present: Lego Masters Jr. ===
Following her father's death in July 2025, Osbourne and Ozzy's duet "Changes" debuted at number 8 on the UK Singles Downloads Chart. She began hosting Lego Masters Jr. in August and appeared in Ozzy Osbourne: Coming Home, a documentary about her father's life.

In 2026, she was brought up on stage by Scissor Sisters.

== Personal life ==
In 2003, Osbourne dated Bert McCracken, singer of The Used, who briefly appeared on her family's reality series. In 2006, she dated Matty Derham of the band Fields. In 2008, she began a relationship with model Luke Worrall; they became engaged in 2009 but separated in 2010. She later dated Don Broco front man Rob Damiani in 2011.

In July 2013, Osbourne became engaged to Matthew Mosshart, a chef whom she met at the 2011 wedding of model Kate Moss to Jamie Hince. Osbourne and Mosshart ended their engagement in January 2014.

In 2018, she described herself as experiencing misophonia, a neurobehavioural condition associated with an intolerance of specific sounds or related stimuli.

In July 2025, Osbourne became engaged to Slipknot DJ Sid Wilson. The proposal took place backstage at her father Ozzy's final concert with Black Sabbath at Villa Park in Birmingham and was later shared on her Instagram account. The couple, who had been friends since 1999, began dating in early 2022 and have a son who was born later that year. In March 2026, it was reported that Osbourne and Wilson had ended their engagement. People reported in August 2026 that Osbourne's relationship with Wilson was now in a turbulent stage and that she was "not happy" with him.

Osbourne owns a farm in Indianola, Iowa.

== Activism and charity work ==
On 1 April 2010, Osbourne and her mother Sharon joined Cyndi Lauper in launching the Give a Damn campaign, part of Lauper's True Colours Fund to raise wider awareness of discrimination faced by the LGBT community. The initiative encouraged straight people to stand alongside, lesbian, gay, bisexual, and transgender individuals in opposing discrimination. Other public figures involved in the campaign included Whoopi Goldberg, Jason Mraz, Elton John, Judith Light, Cynthia Nixon, Kim Kardashian, Anna Paquin, and Clay Aiken.

In December 2010, she appeared on the ITV gameshow The Cube, where she won £20,000 for The Prince's Trust.

Following Hurricane Sandy, Osbourne volunteered with the Salvation Army in Staten Island, New York, during their recovery efforts in November 2012.

== Discography ==
=== Albums ===
List of albums, with selected details and chart positions
Title	Details	Peak chart positions					
Title	Details	UK	AUS	FIN	GER	US	US Elec.
Shut Up	Released date: 26 November 2002; Label: Epic	31	100	16	30	101	—
Sleeping in the Nothing	Released date: 7 June 2005; Label: Sanctuary	57	—	—	—	117	2
"—" denotes releases that did not chart or were not released in that territory.

=== Singles ===
List of singles as lead artist, with selected chart positions and certifications, showing year released and album name
Title	Year	Peak chart positions								Certifications	Album
Title	Year	UK	AUS	GER	NOR	NZ	SWE	SWI	US	Certifications	Album
"Papa Don't Preach"	2002	3	3	24	—	31	19	65	74	ARIA: Platinum	Shut Up
"Shut Up"	2003	12	34	52	15	44	19	81	—		Shut Up
"Changes" (with Ozzy Osbourne)	2003	1	—	15	15	—	26	—	— (Note: "Changes" did not enter the Billboard Hot 100, but the Felix da Housecat Remix peaked at number 43 on the US Billboard Dance Club Songs Chart.)	BPI: Gold	Changes
"One Word"	2005	9	38	60	—	—	48	—	— (Note: "One Word" did not enter the Billboard Hot 100, but peaked at number 21 on the Bubbling Under Hot 100 chart.)		Sleeping in the Nothing
"—" denotes releases that did not chart or were not released in that territory.

== Filmography ==
=== Television ===
Year	Title	Role	Notes
1991	The Joan Rivers Show	Herself	1 episode
1994–2004	Howard Stern	Herself	9 episodes
2002–2005	The Osbournes	Herself	Main role
2003–2006	The Sharon Osbourne Show	Herself	4 episodes
2003–2006	Top of the Pops	Herself	5 episodes
2004	Life as We Know It	Deborah Tynan	Main role
2005	The Muppets' Wizard of Oz	Dorothy Gale	Television film
2005	Bo' Selecta!	Herself	Episode: "A Bear's Tail"
2006	Kelly Osbourne: Turning Japanese	Herself	Documentary
2006	I'm a Celebrity...Get Me Out of Here! NOW!	Herself	Presenter (season 6)
2006	Making Your Mind Up	Herself	Judge (season 8)
2006–2011	8 Out of 10 Cats	Herself	5 episodes
2007–2008	Project Catwalk	Herself	Host (season 2–3)
2009	Osbournes Reloaded	Herself	Host; also executive producer
2009	Hotel Babylon	Jo	1 episode
2009	Dancing with the Stars	Herself	Contestant (season 9)
2009–2010	The Ellen DeGeneres Show	Herself	4 episodes
2009–2011	Fashion News Live	Herself	7 episodes
2009–2021	Chelsea Lately	Herself	5 episodes
2009–2021	Entertainment Tonight	Herself	11 episodes
2010	RuPaul's Drag U	Herself	Episode: "Super Sisters"
2010	Piers Morgan's Life Stories	Herself	Episode: "Kelly Osbourne"
2010	The Spin Crowd	Herself	Episode: "Give and Take"
2010–2015	Fashion Police	Co-host / Panellist	201 episodes
2010–2020	The Talk	Herself - Guest	30 episodes
2011	Miss USA 2011	Co-host	Television special
2012	America's Next Top Model	Herself	Episode: "Kelly Osbourne"
2012	RuPaul's Drag Race	Herself	Episode: "Float Your Boat"
2012	Miss USA 2012	Herself	Television special
2012	RuPaul's Drag Race: All Stars	Herself	Episode: "All Star Girl Groups"
2012	Jane by Design	Herself	Episode: "The Second Chance"
2012	Are We There Yet?	Megan Jackson	5 episodes
2012	Drop Dead Diva	Joyce Keck	Episode: "Jane's Getting Married"
2013	Phineas and Ferb	Herself	Episode: "Phineas and Ferb's Musical Cliptastic Countdown Hosted by Kelly Osbourne"
2013	Sweat the Small Stuff	Herself	2 episodes
2014	Global Threads	Herself	Television special
2014–2016	The 7D	Hildy Gloom (voice)	Main role; 42 episodes
2015	Australia's Next Top Model	Herself	1 episode
2015–2017	Project Runway: Junior	Herself	Judge
2015–2019	Celebrity Juice	Herself	5 episodes
2016	Australia's Got Talent	Herself	Judge (season 8)
2016	CSI: Cyber	Stella Kaine	Episode: "The Walking Dead"
2016	The Eric Andre Show	Herself	Episode: "Warren G; Kelly Osbourne"
2017	Snoop Dogg presents the Joker's Wild	Herself	3 episodes
2017	Home & Family	Herself	1 episode
2017	Battle of the Network Stars	Herself - Contestant	1 episode
2018	Ozzy & Jack's World Detour	Herself	Main role (season 3)
2018	Loose Women	Herself	2 episodes
2019	The Masked Singer	Herself	Contestant (season 2)
2019	The $100,000 Pyramid	Herself	1 episode
2020	The Masked Singer UK	Herself	1 episode
2020	Legendary	Herself	Episode: "Remember the Times"
2020	Celebrity Ghost Stories	Herself	Episode: "Tom Arnold, Dee Snider, Carnie Wilson and Nia Long"
2020	Celebrity Watch Party	Herself	Episode: "The Celebrity Watch Party Has Begun"
2020	Celebrity Call Center	Herself	Episode: "The Shift with the Flashing Moms"
2020	The Osbournes: Night of Terror	Herself	Television special
2020, 2022	I Can See Your Voice	Herself	2 episodes
2022	Name That Tune	Herself	Episode: "TV Royalty and Gridiron Champs"
2022	The Very VERY Best of the 80s	Host	3 episodes
2023	Beat Shazam	Herself - Guest DJ	12 episodes
2023	Lego Masters Celebrity Holiday Bricktacular	Herself	
2025	Lego Masters Jr.	Herself	4 episodes
2025	Sharon and Ozzy Osbourne: Coming Home	Herself	Documentary
2025	Ozzy: No Escape From Now	Herself	Documentary

=== Film ===
Year	Title	Role	Notes
2001	We Sold Our Souls for Rock 'n Roll	Herself	Documentary
2002	Austin Powers in Goldmember	Herself	
2006	Live Freaky! Die Freaky!	Sharon (voice)	Direct-to-video film
2007	Punk's Not Dead	Herself	Documentary
2008	The Town That Boars Me	Model Citizen Judge 1	Short film
2011	The Muppets	Herself	
2012	The Tents	Herself	Documentary
2012	Should've Been Romeo	Nicole	
2013	So Undercover	Becky Slotsky	
2014	Sharknado 2: The Second One	Flight Attendant	

=== Music videos ===
Year	Music video	Role	Artist
1991	"No More Tears"	Little Girl on TV	Ozzy Osbourne
2003	"Fall Back Down"	Girl Playing Dominoes	Rancid
2013	"Happy"	Girl in Street	Pharrell Williams
2014	"Marilyn Monroe"	Herself	Pharrell Williams
2014	"L.A. Love (La La)"	Partygoer	Fergie

== Awards and nominations ==
Year	Association	Category	Nominated work	Result
2002	VH1 Big in 2002 Awards	You Kiss Your Mother with That Mouth?	Herself	Nominated
2002	Smash Hits Poll Winners Party	Best Rock Act	Herself	Nominated
2002	Teen Choice Awards	Choice Breakout Star Female	The Osbournes	Won
2003	Teen Choice Awards	Favorite TV Personality	The Osbournes	Nominated
2003	Teen Choice Awards	Choice TV Reality/Variety Star – Female	The Osbournes	Won
2003	Teen Choice Awards	Choice Reality Babe	The Osbournes	Nominated
2003	Teen Choice Awards	Choice Fashion Icon: Female	Herself	Nominated
2003	MTV Video Music Brasil	Best Video International	"Papa Don't Preach"	Nominated
2003	NME Awards	Worst Dressed	Herself	Nominated
2003	NME Awards	Worst Hair	Herself	Nominated
2003	Smash Hits Poll Winners Party	Flop Pop Mop	Herself	Won
2005	Smash Hits Poll Winners Party	Worst Dressed Star	Herself	Nominated
2005	Billboard Music Awards	Top Hot Dance Singles Sales Artist	Herself	Nominated
2005	Billboard Music Awards	Top Hot Dance Single Sales Track	"One Word"	Nominated
2005	Billboard Music Awards	Top Hot Dance Airplay Track	"One Word"	Nominated
2007	Whatsonstage.com Theatregoers' Choice Awards	Best Takeover in a Role	Chicago	Nominated
2008	Sony Radio Academy Awards	Rising Star Award	Herself	Nominated
2008	LK Today High Street Fashion Awards	Best Dressed Celebrity in High Street Fashion	Herself	Won
2008	Glamour	Theatre Actress of the Year	Chicago	Won
2013	Young Hollywood Awards	Style Icon	Herself	Won

== See also ==
- List of artists who reached number one on the US dance chart
- List of number-one dance hits (United States)
