= One Word =

2005 single by Kelly Osbourne

Single by Kelly Osbourne

from the album Sleeping in the Nothing
- B-side: "Sound of the Crowd"
- Released: 9 May 2005
- Genre: Synth-pop
- Length: 4:03
- Label: Sanctuary
- Songwriter: Linda Perry
- Producer: Linda Perry

Kelly Osbourne singles chronology
"Changes" (2003)	"One Word" (2005)

"One Word" is a song by the English singer Kelly Osbourne, released as the only single from her second studio album, Sleeping in the Nothing (2005), on 9 May 2005. Unlike the pop-punk sound Osbourne sported in the past, "One Word" is a synth-pop song that showed Osbourne embracing dance music. The chorus melody samples the song "Fade to Grey" (1980) by British new wave pop band Visage. Charting in ten countries, the single debuted and peaked at number nine on the UK Singles Chart, and at number one on the UK Independent Singles Chart. To date it is Osbourne's last single release.

== Critical reception ==
"One Word" received positive reviews from music critics, even some of Osbourne's harshest critics. On the track, Billboard said "she glides through the space-age number like she's the princess of the new wave dancefloor". Similarly, Malinda Lo said the track "eases you in with a spacey, synthesized intro" and "makes use of computer assistance in the best possible way". Brian Hiatt with Rolling Stone remarked, "Turns out her affectless vocals are better suited to...Eurythmics-biting synth-pop". While the single was not successful on the US Billboard Hot 100, it was highly successful on the US dance charts where it reached number one on three US dance charts. It was consistently played at nightclubs across the nation, due to a remix by acclaimed DJ Chris Cox.

Slant Magazine ranked it as the fourth best single of 2005.

== Chart performance ==
On 15 May 2005, "One Word" debuted and peaked at number nine on the UK Singles Chart becoming Osbourne's third top 10 hit in the United Kingdom. A week later, it dropped to number 16 and the week after, it fell to number 21. Then on 11 June it fell nine places to number 30 and then eleven places to number 41. The following week, it dropped to number 62 and the song made its last appearance on the chart on 2 July at number 98, lasting seven weeks on the chart. Additionally, "One Word" debuted at number one on the UK Independent Singles Chart, and went on to appear for ten weeks on that chart. The single placed at number 157 on the year-end charts.

In the United States, "One Word" failed to chart on the US Billboard Hot 100 but peaked at number 21 on Bubbling Under Hot 100 chart, a continuation of the Billboard Hot 100.

In total, the single charted in ten countries.

== Music video ==
The music video to "One Word" was filmed in early 2005 and was directed by Chris Applebaum. The video, which is filmed in black and white and is based on several themes and scenes from the 1965 French cult sci-fi movie Alphaville, une étrange aventure de Lemmy Caution (Alphaville: Strange Adventure of Lemmy Caution, mostly known simply as Alphaville) by Jean-Luc Godard.

The video begins with Osbourne sitting in the back of a black taxi with two men sitting in front of her as it rains outside. She then opens a book onto a page with a picture of a man and on the other page is words handwritten in French. The two men then walk into a building followed by Osbourne and they enter a room where Osbourne sings to two microphone speakers. While she's doing this, scientific shapes start appearing on a black screen with subtitles below which reads "What is the privilege of the dead?, To die... no more". After this, she, along with the two men, walk down a spiral staircase and then she enters an elevator with a woman inside. Kelly then notices that the woman has the code 37164 tattooed on her neck and as she and the men exit the elevator, she takes out her camera necklace and takes a picture of the woman. She then walks down the corridor singing the chorus while sliding her hands on the walls. After this, she and the men enter a room and the two men sit in front of a table with a woman standing on it with a scientist positioning her.

Osbourne is shown taking notes of what is happening but as she's doing this, it is shown that a picture is above her but it's the same picture of the man that was shown in her book at the beginning of the video. She then gets her camera necklace out again and takes a picture of the scientist positioning the woman. She and the two men enter another room where three women who are dressed in swimsuits are shown placing roses on three men. A bird is then shown flying around the room but while this is happening, one of the men exhales a cloud of smoke. Kelly and the two men then walk out of the room and enter another room where an audience of men are scoring a woman who is modelling and posing for them. Towards the end of the video, Osbourne is shown laying on a bed, but she pulls out a ball from under her sleeve with the number one marked on it. She then rolls it over to the woman modelling for the men and she bends over to pick it up. The model goes over to a man and sits on his lap to distract him. While he's not looking, she places the ball into a hole which causes a series of television screens to display random numbers. After this, Kelly and the two men leave the building and get back in the taxi. As they are driving, she looks out the back window and sees that the street lights they drive past the turn off as the screen fades to black.

== Track listing ==
- iTunes EP
1. "One Word" (Chris Cox remix) – 7:56
2. "One Word" – 4:03
3. "One Word" (Favela Funk remix) – 4:16
4. "One Word" (instrumental) – 4:05
5. "Sound of the Crowd" (Human League cover) – 3:55
- CD single
1. "One Word" (Chris Cox club remix) – 7:57
2. "One Word" (album version) – 4:03
3. "One Word" (Favela Funk remix) – 4:16
4. "One Word" (album instrumental) – 4:05
5. "Sound of the Crowd" (Human League cover) – 3:55

- One Word Pt. 1
1. "One Word" (radio edit) – 3:35
2. "One Word" (Chris Cox's radio edit) – 3:57
- One Word Pt. 2
1. "One Word" (album version) – 4:03
2. "Sound of the Crowd" – 3:55
3. "One Word" (Chris Cox's club remix) – 7:57
4. "One Word" (music video)

== Charts ==
=== Weekly charts ===
Chart (2005)	Peak position
Australia (ARIA)	38
Belgium (Ultratip Bubbling Under Flanders)	12
Belgium (Ultratip Bubbling Under Wallonia)	17
Germany (GfK)	60
Ireland (IRMA)	19
Netherlands (Dutch Top 40 Tipparade)	6
Netherlands (Single Top 100)	83
Scottish Singles Sales (Official Charts)	7
Spain (Promusicae)	9
Sweden (Sverigetopplistan)	48
UK Singles (Official Charts)	9
UK Indie (Official Charts)	1
US Bubbling Under Hot 100 (Billboard)	21
US Dance Club Songs (Billboard) Chris Cox/M. Rizzo mixes	1
US Dance Singles Sales (Billboard)	1
US Dance Airplay (Billboard)	1
US Pop 100 (Billboard)	82

=== Year-end charts ===
Chart (2005)	Position
UK Singles (OCC)	157
US Dance Club Play (Billboard)	20
US Dance Singles Sales (Billboard)	4
US Hot Dance Airplay (Billboard)	2
