= Jonathan Saunders =

Scottish fashion designer

- Born: 1977 (age 48–49); Glasgow
- Education: Stonelaw High School; Glasgow School of Art; Central Saint Martins College of Art and Design
- Occupation: Fashion designer
- Awards: Elle Style Awards British Designer of the Year 2008; British Fashion Council/Vogue Designer Fashion Fund Award 2012
- Website: www.jonathan-saunders.com

Jonathan Saunders (born 1977) is a Scottish fashion designer, known for his work with prints and use of traditional silk screening techniques. Celebrities who have worn his designs include Madonna, Kylie Minogue, Sienna Miller and Michelle Obama.

== Career ==
Saunders graduated from Glasgow School of Art in 1999 with a BA in printed textiles, and went on to gain an MA in the subject at Central Saint Martins College of Art and Design in 2002. His graduate collection, which featured a series of brightly printed chiffon kaftans inspired by the Beatles' Yellow Submarine album cover, won him the 2002 Lancome Colour Award. Within two days of his graduation show Saunders was commissioned to design prints for Alexander McQueen and produced a bird-of-paradise print for McQueen's 2003 collection. Saunders was also enlisted as a consultant for fashion houses Chloé and Pucci under the direction of Christian Lacroix.

Saunders made his debut at London Fashion Week in September 2003. British Vogue featured one of Saunders' designs on the cover of the January 2004 issue, and Harrods and Harvey Nichols placed orders for his designs.

Saunders continued to show regularly at London Fashion Week until 2008, when he decided to take his collection to New York Fashion Week in a move he described as "a natural progression". He returned to London Fashion Week in 2010.

Saunders was previously creative director of Milan-based fashion house Pollini, for whom he designed ranges for retail chains Target and Topshop. He was succeeded by Nicholas Kirkwood.

On 8 December 2015 Saunders announced the closure of his eponymous label, citing 'personal reasons'.

== Accolades ==
- 2005 Scottish Fashion Designer of the Year - Scottish Style Awards
- 2006 Designer of the Year - Scottish Fashion Awards
- 2008 British Designer of the Year - Elle Style Awards
