= Nicholas Kirkwood =

British footwear designer (born 1980)

Nicholas Matthew Schneidau Kirkwood (born July 1980) is a British footwear designer. He lives in Bethnal Green, London.

== Early life ==
Nicholas Matthew Schneidau Kirkwood was born in July 1980. He learned the craft of shoemaking at London-based Cordwainers College.

== Career ==
Kirkwood formed his eponymous British brand in 2004, together with his business partner Christopher Suarez. In 2013, LVMH acquired a majority stake in his company for an undisclosed sum. Kirkwood’s collections are distributed in 150 leading department and specialty stores around the world as well as three flagship stores in London, New York and Las Vegas.

In 2010, Kirkwood succeeded Jonathan Saunders as creative director of Milan-based fashion house Pollini. He left the company in 2014.

== Recognition ==
Kirkwood has twice been named Accessories Designer of the Year at the British Fashion Awards, and in 2013 became the first Accessories Designer to be awarded the British Fashion Council/Vogue Designer Fashion Fund.

=== Awards ===
- 2005: Conde Nast / Footwear News - Vivian Infantino Award for Emerging Talent
- 2007: Vogue Italia / Alta Roma - Who’s on Next Award for Accessory Designer
- 2008: Conde Nast / Footwear News - Designer of the Year
- 2008: British Fashion Awards - Swarovski Award for Emerging Talent - Accessories
- 2008: British Fashion Council - S/S 2009 - New Gen
- 2008: British Fashion Council - A/W 2008 - New Gen
- 2009: British Fashion Council - A/W 2009 - New Gen
- 2010: British Fashion Award - Accessory Designer of the Year Award
- 2010: DWGSN Global Fashion Awards - Most Influential Designer - Accessories
- 2011: Conde Nast / Footwear News - Designer of the Year
- 2012: British Fashion Award - Accessories Designer of the Year Award
- 2012: Elle UK Style Awards - Accessories Designer of the Year
- 2013: BFC and Vogue Designer Fashion Fund - Prize winner
- 2013: Elle Style Awards - Accessories Designer of the Year
- 2013: British Fashion Awards - Accessory Designer of the Year.
