= William Chambers (milliner) =

Scottish hat designer (born 1979)

- Born: William Chambers; 1979 (age 46–47); Shotts, North Lanarkshire, Scotland
- Education: Scottish College of Textiles; Glasgow Metropolitan College
- Occupations: Milliner, hat designer
- Years active: 2007–present
- Known for: Founder of William Chambers Millinery
- Notable work: Handmade hats and headpieces stocked in Harrods and Fortnum & Mason
- Awards: Accessory Designer of the Year, Scottish Fashion Awards (2010, 2012, 2014)

William Chambers (born 1979) is a Scottish milliner, from Shotts in North Lanarkshire, now based in Glasgow. He creates handmade hats and headpieces that are stocked in the country’s top department stores such as Harrods and Fortnum & Mason, Coast as well as in his own hat shop and atelier in Glasgow city centre. He studied textile design at the Scottish College of Textiles in Galashiels, and millinery at Glasgow Metropolitan College before setting up his own brand in 2007. He was nominated for Accessory Designer of the Year at the Scottish Fashion Awards in 2008, and later won in 2010, 2012 and 2014. His designs have appeared in Vanity Fair, Vogue, Elle, Harpers Bazaar, Glamour, Tatler and Wallpaper.

In 2018 he exhibited a collection at the Lighthouse in Glasgow celebrating the 150th anniversary of the birth of Charles Rennie Mackintosh. Between July and October 2023 his 'Glove' hat was part of the 'Beyond the Little Black Dress' exhibition at the National Museum of Scotland.

His hats have been worn by a number of celebrities including Kate Moss, Meghan Markle, Lauryn Hill, Roisin Murphy, Geri Halliwell, Kelis, Judy Murray, Motsi Mabuse on a Halloween episode of Strictly Come Dancing in 2022, and as costume in the tv show Good Omens.
