= Project Catwalk =

- Starring: Julien Macdonald; Ben de Lisi; Elizabeth Hurley (Series 1); Lorraine Candy (Series 1); Kelly Osbourne (Series 2–3); Paula Reed (Series 2–3)
- Country of origin: United Kingdom
- Original language: English
- No. of series: 3
- No. of episodes: 30

Production
- Running time: 60 minutes (incl. commercials)
- Production company: Shine TV

Original release
- Network: Sky One
- Release: 12 January 2006 – 19 March 2008

Project Catwalk is a competitive reality television show focusing on fashion design. In the UK it is shown on the digital station Sky One. The show follows a group of fashion designers as they compete against each other to avoid being "the next fashion victim" and win the competition. The programme is based upon the US reality show Project Runway. The show was cancelled after the third series.

== Format ==
Project Catwalk is hosted by a celebrity and judged by a panel with two permanent judges and a third guest judge – typically a fashion designer, fashion model or celebrity from the fashion industry. Ben de Lisi, fashion designer, appears as a mentor for the designers giving his criticism of their garments and offering support. The program takes place in London with designers using a workroom in Istituto Marangoni, shopping for materials at a large fabric store in London's garment district, and living together in a four-storey Georgian townhouse in Central London.

The fashion models who work with the designers throughout the series are also in competition. At the beginning of each episode, the designer who won the previous week's challenge is compelled to switch two models (not necessarily including his/her own), and at the end, the model who wore the losing design is automatically eliminated. Included in the prize package for the winning model is coverage in the British edition of ELLE magazine.

Sky1 has confirmed that Project Catwalk will not be returning for a fourth series.

Channel controller Richard Woolfe hinted at the Edinburgh International Television Festival that the show had reached a conclusion and would be replaced by other female-skewing shows in the lineup.

"What we really need are some female-friendly formatted shows," he said. "8pm is a real opportunity. We're doing really well at 9pm and 10pm but I'd really like to see some long-running returnable series. We've done three seasons of Catwalk; I want some other shows for that slot."

A spokesperson for the channel has subsequently confirmed that the programme will not return because it "had come to a natural end". The show lasted for a total of three series.

== Series overview ==
Project Runway series overview
Season	Contestants	Episodes	Originally released			Winner	Runner(s)-up
Season	Contestants	Episodes	First released	Last released	Network	Winner	Runner(s)-up
1	12	10	January 12, 2006	March 16, 2006	Sky One	Kirsty Doyle	Matthew Bowkett
2	12	10	January 8, 2007	March 19, 2007	Sky One	Wayne Aveline	Monika Patrycja Rene
3	13	10	January 9, 2008	March 19, 2008	Sky One	Jasper Garvida	Chelsey Oliver

=== Series 1 ===
The first series of Project Catwalk featured Elizabeth Hurley as the host and was judged by a panel including designer Julien Macdonald and ELLE magazine Editor-in-Chief Lorraine Candy. 12 contestants competed in a series of competitions.

=== Series 2 ===
Series 2 of Project Catwalk premiered on 8 January 2007 on Sky One. It was hosted by Kelly Osbourne and Lorraine Candy was replaced by Grazia magazine's editor Paula Reed.

=== Series 3 ===
Series 3 of Project Catwalk premiered 9 January 2008, and featured 13 contestants vying for the prizes. Nick Ede replaced MacDonald as judge. Kelly Osbourne returned as the show's host.
