= Scottish Fashion Awards =

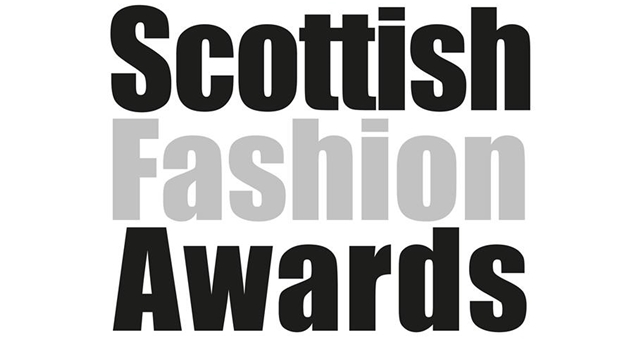
- Awarded for: Excellence in the Scottish fashion industry
- Country: Scotland
- Presented by: Hartmann Media
- First award: May 2006
- Website: scottishfashionawards.com

The Scottish Fashion Awards was an annual awards ceremony honouring Scottish designers, photographers, models and fashion industry leaders. Founded in 2006, the event organiser was Tessa Hartmann, owner of a Scottish-based PR firm to promote her clients and their friends. Their mission is "...to provide an outstanding platform for Scottish creatives, from designers and photographers, to models, fashion communicators and industry leaders."

== Awards events ==
=== 2006 ===
The inaugural event was held at Stirling Castle with GMTV presenter Jenni Falconer acting as emcee. Entertainment was provided by Sandi Thom and electric fiddle player Laura McPhee.

The winners were:

- Designer of the Year - Jonathan Saunders
- Model of the Year - Kirsty Hume
- Young Designer - Christopher Kane
- Textiles/Cashmere Designer - Jennifer Lang
- Communicator of the Year - Joe McKenna
- Fashion Icon - Lulu
- Retailer of the Year - USC
- International Designer of the Year - Viktor & Rolf
- Hall of Fame - Albert Watson

=== 2007 ===
Jenni Falconer once again hosted the event which was held at Stirling Castle on 9 September. The judges included Kate Phelan, fashion director of British Vogue, and Jennifer Uner, founder of the Los Angeles Fashion Show.

Winners included:

- Designer of the Year - Christopher Kane
- Retailer of the Year - Schuh
- Fashion Icon - Sharleen Spiteri of the group ‘Texas’

=== 2008 ===
The third annual event was held at Stirling Castle on 29 June.

The winners were:

- Designer of the Year - Christopher Kane
- Lifetime Achievement Award/Hall of Fame - Sam McKnight
- Best Use of Tartan - Henry Holland
- Model of the Year - Emily McWilliams
- Young Designer of the Year - Graeme Armour
- Textiles Brand of the Year - Johnstons of Elgin
- Communicator of the Year - David Eustace
- Fashion Icon - Darius Danesh
- Retailer of the Year - Norton & Sons
- Accessory Designer of the Year - Bebaroque Hoisery
- Best Use of Tartan - House of Holland

=== 2009 ===
The 2009 event was held in Stirling Castle in June with Graeme Black, Siouxsie Sioux and Pam Hogg providing entertainment. The judging panel included GANT creative director Brian Rennie, Vogue.com editor Dolly Jones and Janette Harkess, deputy editor of The Herald.

The winners were:

- Hall of Fame - Pam Hogg
- Designer of the Year - Graeme Black
- Textile Brand of the Year - Harris Tweed Hebrides
- Young Designer of the Year - Holly Fulton
- Retailer of the Year - Ultimo
- Model of the Year - Gillian Cook, The Model Team
- Communicator of the Year - Nick Ede
- Graduate of the Year - Neil Young, Central St Martins
- Accessory/Jewellery Designer of the Year - Joyce Paton
- Best Use of Scottish Fabric - Paul Smith
- Style Icon - Jenni Falconer
- New Face - Christina Chalk

=== 2010 ===
On 20 June, after four years at Stirling Castle, the event was moved to the Glasgow Science Centre and was hosted by Laura Whitmore. The judges included Brian Duffy, (president of Ralph Lauren Europe), Nathalie Colin (creative director of Swarovski), designer Amanda Wakeley, Professor Wendy Dagworthy (Fashion & Textiles at the Royal College of Art), Brigitte Stepputis (head of couture at Vivienne Westwood), Robert Johnston (associate editor of GQ) and VOGUE.COM's editor Dolly Jones.

The winners were:

- Designer of the Year - Jonathan Saunders
- Young Designer of the Year - Holly Fulton
- Accessory Designer of the Year - William Chambers
- Model of the Year - Lisa Omond
- International Designer of the Year/Best Use of Scottish Textile - Markus Lupfer
- Fashion Hall of Fame - Malcolm Edwards
- Fashion Icon - Paolo Nutini
- Communicator of the Year - Eilidh McAskill
- Retailer of the Year - Cruise
- New Face - Terri McGlone
- Graduate of the Year - Jett Sweeney

=== 2011 ===
The 2011 event was again held in the Glasgow Science Centre and was once again hosted by Laura Whitmore.

The winners were:

- Designer of the Year - Jonathan Saunders
- Young Designer of the Year - Henrietta Ludgate
- Scottish Retailer of the Year - Rox
- International Designer of the Year - House of Holland
- Fashion Icon - Freya Mavor
- Fashion Graduate of the Year - Campbell Dunn
- Scottish Textile Brand of the Year - Harris Tweed Hebrides

=== 2012 ===
The event was held at Glasgow's Clyde Auditorium.

The winners were:

- Designer of the Year - Christopher Kane
- Young Designer of the Year - Hayley Scanlan
- Fashion Ambassador - Colin McDowell
- Hall of Fame - Stella Tennant
- Textile Brand of the Year - Dashing Tweeds
- Accessory Designer of the Year - William Chambers
- Fashion Icon - Karen Gillan
- Communicator of the Year - Faye McLeod
- Model of the Year - Tali Lennox
- Retailer of the Year - Shhh-Oohs
- Fashion Photographer - Jonathan Daniel Pryce
- New Face - Kerry O'May
- Graduate of the Year - Joanne McGillivary from Herriot Watt, David Black was awarded a high commended certificate.
- International Designer of the Year (for use of a Scottish fabric) - Mulberry
- Fashion Innovator - Brian Rennie, creative director of Basler

=== 2013 ===
The event was held at London's Dover House with Laura Whitmore returning as the host.

The winners were:

- Scottish Designer of the Year - Christopher Kane
- International Designer of the Year (For Best Use of Scottish Fabric) - Chanel
- Model of the Year - Mary Charteris
- Fashion Icon - Emeli Sandé
- Creative Excellence Award - Pam Hogg
- Innovator of the Year - Louise Gray
- Young Designer of the Year - Jennifer Morris
- Textile Designer of the Year - Alice Palmer
- Retailer of the Year - Schuh
- Communicator of the Year - Penny Martin
- Accessory Designer of the Year - Finlay & Co.

=== 2014 ===
The event was held in London on 1 September with Laura Whitmore returning as host.

The winners were:

- Designer of the Year - Christopher Kane
- Young Designer of the Year - Hayley Scanlan
- Textile Brand of the Year - Dhu
- Communicator of the Year - Avril Mair, Harper's Bazaar
- Retailer of the Year - Abandon Ship Apparel
- Accessory Designer of the Year - William Chambers Millinery
- Fashion Graduate of the Year - Colleen Leitch
- International Designer of the Year - Simone Rocha
- Model of the Year - Jean Campbell
- Exporter of the Year - Mackintosh
- Luxury Retailer - Harvey Nichols, Edinburgh
- Fashion Icon 2014 - Amy Macdonald
- Hall of Fame 2014 - Dame Vivienne Westwood
- Fashion Ambassador 2014 - Professor Christopher Moore on behalf of Professor Pamela Gillies, British School of Fashion and Belinda Earle on behalf of Marc Bolland, Marks & Spencer
- Founders Awards 2014 - David Gandy

=== 2015 ===
The 2015 event was held at the Corinthia Hotel in London on 3 September 2015.

The winners were:

- Designer of the Year - Christopher Kane
- Scottish Textile Brand / Manufacturer of the Year - Barrie Knitwear
- Communicator of the Year - Lynsey Alexander (Make Up Artist)
- Young Designer of the Year - Cats Brothers
- Fashion Graduate of the Year - Charles Jeffrey (Central Saint Martins)
- Retailer of the Year - Walker Slater
- Model of the Year - Misha Hart (VIVA Model Management)
- Accessory Designer of the Year - Hunter Boot Ltd
- Fashion Philanthropist - Nick Ede
- Fashion Icon - Connor Ball (The Vamps)
- Luxury Retailer of the Year - Belstaff (Glasgow)
- International Designer (for best use of Scottish fabric) - Topman
- Founders Award - Pringle of Scotland
- Hall of Fame - David Eustace

== Reception ==
In 2011, the blogsite World Fashion Awards described the Scottish Fashion Awards as a "...globally recognised tartan carpet." In 2014, Vogue stated that the awards highlight Scotland's "...substantial contribution to the fashion industry."

When the 2014 nominees were announced, Alistair Carmichael (Secretary of State for Scotland) stated, "These awards are now recognized around the world as the benchmark of success within the global fashion community and are without a doubt the most high-profile showcase of Scottish fashion, design and textile talent in the country."

== See also ==
- List of fashion awards
