= Sleeping in the Nothing =

Studio album by Kelly Osbourne
- Released: 7 June 2005
- Recorded: 2004–2005
- Genres: New wave; synth-pop; dance-rock
- Length: 43:09
- Label: Sanctuary
- Producer: Linda Perry

Kelly Osbourne chronology
Shut Up (2002)	Sleeping in the Nothing (2005)

Singles from Sleeping in the Nothing
- 1. "One Word" Released: 19 April 2005

Sleeping in the Nothing is the second studio album by English singer Kelly Osbourne, released on 7 June 2005 by Sanctuary Records. Unlike the pop-punk sound of her debut album, Shut Up, Sleeping in the Nothing features Osbourne singing to 1980s-inspired electro beats. For the role of producer, Osbourne worked with Linda Perry.

The Japanese edition of the album contains a cover of the 1986 Stacey Q song "Two of Hearts" as a bonus track.

Not long after the album's release, Osbourne was dropped by Sanctuary Records.

== Promotion ==
Osbourne promoted the album with several appearances on TV shows and award ceremonies, including CD:UK, and the MTV Australia Video Music Awards 2005. Osbourne also made an appearance on Friday Night with Jonathan Ross, during which Ross made comments on Osbourne's weight in regards to the album cover, saying she had been "airbrushed". Osbourne later said of the appearance: "The band that was performing was New Order and they refused to play until he apologised. A lot of it wasn't shown on TV because if they saw what he really said to me, I don't think any parent in the world would ever watch his show again. What he said to me destroyed me for two years". Osbourne also said Ross' comments caused her to "sabotage" her record deal: "I thought, 'What the fuck is the point in me doing this shit when a grown man insults me in this way? I'm not strong enough to do this. I'd rather be the trust-fund kid that everyone thinks I am than work my arse off to get insulted'". She admitted herself to rehab in June 2005, which stopped any further promotion for the album.

== Critical reception ==
Professional ratings
Review scores
Source	Rating
AllMusic	3/5 stars
Blender	3/5 stars
Entertainment Weekly	C+
Rolling Stone	3/5 stars
Slant Magazine	2.5/5 stars
Star-News	favourable
Stylus	A−

The album received mixed to positive reviews from music critics, many of which began with an admonition to forget about her previous work. Billboard said "the singer sounds incredibly at home in such surroundings". Giving the album three out of five stars, Rolling Stone called it an "occasionally invigorating disc of shiny dance rock". In a C+ review, Entertainment Weekly writer Timothy Gunatilaka wrote: "'Redlight' and 'I Can't Wait' make for fine party starters, and there are fairly groovy beats throughout.

== Commercial performance ==
Sleeping in the Nothing debuted and peaked at number fifty-seven on the UK Albums Chart, lasting one week in the chart. In the United States, the album reached number 117 on the US Billboard 200.

The only single from the album, "One Word", peaked at number one on three Billboard dance charts, making Osbourne the first artist in the history of the Billboard charts to top all three dance surveys in the same week. The single also reached number nine on the UK Singles Chart.

== Track listing ==
All songs written by Linda Perry

1. "One Word" – 4:01
2. "Uh Oh" – 3:12
3. "Redlight" – 3:42
4. "Secret Lover" (Kelly Osbourne, Linda Perry) – 3:24
5. "I Can't Wait" – 4:00
6. "Edge of Your Atmosphere" (Kelly Osbourne, Linda Perry) – 3:45
7. "Suburbia" (Kelly Osbourne, Linda Perry) – 3:34
8. "Don't Touch Me While I'm Sleeping" – 3:19
9. "Save Me" (Kelly Osbourne, Linda Perry) – 3:47
10. "Entropy" – 3:19
11. "One Word" (Chris Cox remix) – 7:55 (hidden track)

Japanese edition bonus track

11. "Two of Hearts" (John Mitchell, Sue Gatlin, Tim Greene) – 3:56
12. "One Word" (Chris Cox remix) – 7:55

== Charts ==
Chart performance for Sleeping in the Nothing
Chart (2005)	Peak position
UK Albums (Official Charts)	57
US Billboard 200	117
US Top Dance Albums (Billboard)	2
US Heatseekers Albums (Billboard)	2
