= Frost French =

Defunct British fashion label

- Type: Privately held company
- Industry: Apparel
- Founded: 1999; 27 years ago
- Defunct: 2011; 15 years ago
- Headquarters: London, United Kingdom
- Key people: Sadie Frost and Jemina French
- Products: Clothing, Accessories, Lingerie

Frost French was a British fashion label established in 1999 and run by British actress Sadie Frost and Jemima French.

== History ==
Frost French was created by Sadie Frost and Jemima French, who have been friends since they were fifteen. The fashion label began in London as a design based studio in 1999. At first the company sold only knickers and lingerie, though later expanded to a full women's wear collection. The company had an Autumn/Winter debut show, which featured Kate Moss's strip tease, on 17 February 2001 at the Duke of York's Theatre in the West End of London.

During the London fashion week in 2003, they named their show the "Frost French Tea Party" at Regent's Park Open Air Theatre. After the exhibition ended, they hosted an afternoon tea party in collaboration with the Tea Council of Great Britain. In 2004, they won the Elle Style Award for "Best British Designer". In 2006, Frost and French appeared as guest judges on Project Catwalk's season 1, episode 2. In September 2007, Frost French opened a boutique store in Islington, London.

The fashion label fell into administration due to £4.2 million worth of debt in 2008 until John Jaokim, a Norwegian film producer and a property investor, bailed out Frost French by investing in the company. John Jaokim joined the board of directors after helping the fashion label financially. In 2009, they sought help from sales agents to reposition their brand and improve product distribution. In the same year, they decided to open their second boutique at Soho in London. The fashion label designed their second store to reflect the playful aesthetic side of Frost French.

Although Frost French recovered in 2008, the company continued to face troubles in 2010 as they suffered a £500,000 loss. Also, John Jaokim and Dominic McVey had resigned, as directors, leaving only Frost and French. Their Spring/Summer 2011 collection was discontinued. As a result, all of Frost French's stores in Islington and Soho had closed down.

After the company disappeared, Frost and French continued to design lingerie, swimwear, and nightwear for the company's sister brands Floozie and Iris & Edie. Early in 2014, the owners gave an official statement of Frost French's plans to relaunch the company. The fashion label said that the relaunch would happen around September 2014 with the first design meeting being held in February 2014. As of 2016, the label had not relaunched, but continued to live on under the Floozie by Frost and French brand.

== Products ==
Frost French described their products as: "classical with a twist of pop." According to the designers, their clothing appeals to the likes of a youthful London girl. They originally produced knickers for women, but they expanded their product line to a full women's wear collection, which includes coats, dresses, lingerie, shirts, and accessories. They have collaborated with Peugeot, GHD, 17 Cosmetics, and Olay in a variety of projects. They also had a contract with Liptons and they sold lipstick-stained teacups, which was an activity for their 'drink gorgeous' campaign.
