= Rox Jewellers =

Scottish jewelry company

ROX Diamonds & Thrills
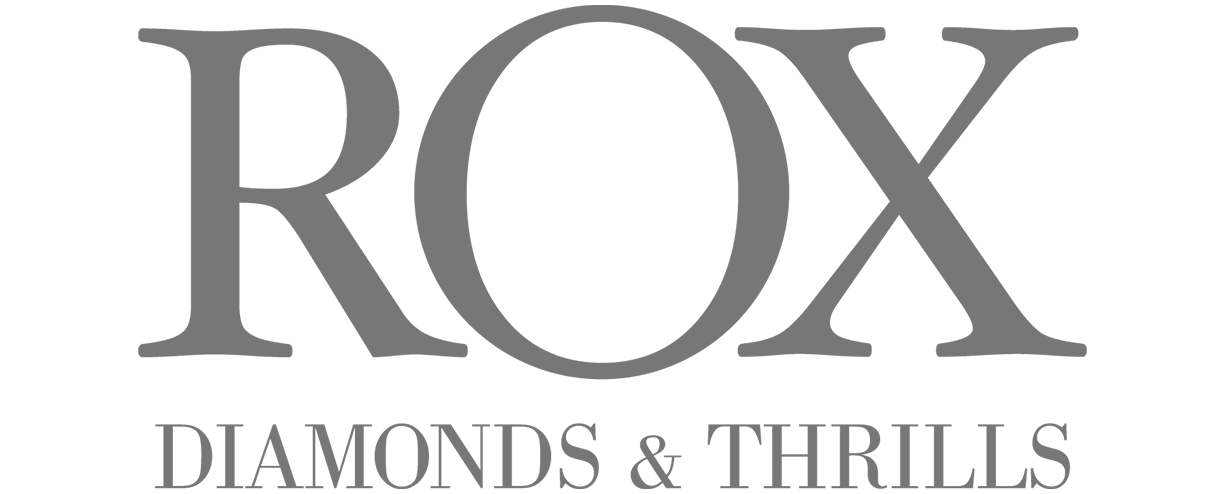
- Type: Private company
- Industry: Jewelry, e-commerce
- Founded: 2002; 24 years ago
- Founder: Kyron Keogh, Grant Mitchell
- Headquarters: Glasgow, United Kingdom
- Website: www.rox.co.uk

ROX is a British jewellers, established in 2002 by Kyron Keogh and Grant Mitchell, that specialises in diamonds and luxury watches – stocking brands such as Hublot, Chopard, Bulgari, Zenith (watchmaker), TAG Heuer, Tudor and Gucci.

== Stores ==
ROX currently operates eight stores across Scotland and England - in Edinburgh, Glasgow, London, Liverpool, Newcastle upon Tyne and Leeds - with an expected turnover in excess of £20m in 2022.

== Awards ==
- Retailer of the Year, Scottish Fashion Awards in 2011.
- Independent Jeweller of the Year, UK Jewellery Awards 2011.

== See also ==
- Jewellery Maker
