= Luke Worrall =

English model (born 1989)

Luke Worrall (born 26 December 1989) is an English model and DJ.

Luke worked as an electrical apprentice in 2008 with Barton Electrical services.

== Modelling ==
Worrall has modelled for companies including Cacharel, DKNY Jeans, Vivienne Westwood, Juicy Couture, go-lo and Dior. He has also starred in editorials for numerous print magazines including GQ Style, Fiasco, Sheer, Arena Homme +, Dazed & Confused, Vogue Italia and Electric Youth Magazine. Luke was also featured in two consecutive issues of Boys by Girls Magazine 'The 4th Floor' and in editorial "Luke in Colour" by photographer Georgie Wileman for the most recent issue 'A Place Called Youth'.

== Acting ==
Worrall starred alongside Nathaniel Brown and Byrdie Bell in the short film Blinders. Directed by Jacob Brown, it was described as "a study of beauty and youth and the special privileges that come with both."

== Personal life ==
He was formerly engaged to Kelly Osbourne.
