= Pam Hogg =

Scottish fashion designer (1951–2025)

- Born: Pamela Elizabeth Hogg; 4 January 1951; Paisley, Renfrewshire, Scotland
- Died: 26 November 2025 (aged 74); London, England
- Education: Glasgow School of Art; Royal College of Art (MA)
- Occupations: Fashion designer; musician
- Years active: c. 1970s–2023
- Awards: 2013 Scottish Fashion Awards Creative Excellence Award
- Website: www.pamhogg.com

Pamela Elizabeth Hogg (4 January 1951 – 26 November 2025) was a Scottish fashion designer who launched her first fashion collection in 1981. Also a musician who played in several bands, she created clothes for Ian Astbury, Paula Yates, Marie Helvin, Siouxsie Sioux and Debbie Harry.

== Early life and education ==
Pamela Elizabeth Hogg was born in Paisley, Renfrewshire, on 4 January 1951. (Note: Hogg never disclosed her age or date of birth publicly. There are conflicting reports about her date of birth: 1951, 1959, 4 January 1959, c. 1959, 1958 or 1959, or 1951.) After studying Fine Arts and Printed Textiles at the Glasgow School of Art, Hogg won the Newbury Medal of Distinction, the Frank Warner Memorial Medal, the Leverhulme Scholarship and the Royal Society of Arts Bursary, and subsequently went on to gain a Master of Arts degree at the Royal College of Art in London.

== Music career ==
Hogg joined her first band, Rubbish, at the end of the 1970s; they regularly supported The Pogues during their early days.

She had a minor hit with Britain's first acid house band, The Garden of Eden, with Kiss FM DJ Steve Jackson, vocalist Angela McCluskey and record producer Mark Tinley.

After concentrating on fashion design during the 1980s, she shifted focus back to music after a brief appearance on stage in Nashville with industrial noise band Pigface in 1990 reaffirmed her love of performing. Unexpectedly landing the support act with Debbie Harry in 1993, she formed a new band, Doll, in five days, and in 1994 with the band firmly established, opened for the post punk band The Raincoats.

In 2003, Hogg was approached by Jarvis Cocker collaborator Jason Buckle to form a "Cramps like band" which would become known as Hoggdoll. Using his swamplike Rockabilly sounds as a backdrop, she wrote and recorded 6 tracks in as many weeks and built up an international underground following. Her song "Honeyland" was included on the 2006 Girlmonster compilation by Berlin-based Art Riot band Chicks on Speed.

== Fashion career ==
Hogg launched her first fashion collection in 1981 at the age of 30. Along with Bodymap, she was part of a new wave of designers who emerged in London at the beginning of the 1980s. She first sold her designs at Hyper Hyper at Kensington Market and later from her own shop in the West End, always refusing to "sell out" to the mainstream fashion industry. Her collections bore names such as Psychedelic Jungle (1981), Warrior Queen (1989), Best Dressed Chicken in Town, And God Created Woman and Wild Wild Women of the West.

Her solo show at the Kelvingrove Art Galleries in 1990 was the first fashion design exhibition to be held there and was well attended. In 1991, Terry Wogan introduced her on his TV show as "one of the most original, inventive, creative designers in Britain", adding, "She has reached what is called Cult Status".

Returning to fashion in 1999, she had two catwalk collections and her first fashion film, Accelerator starring Anita Pallenberg, Bobby Gillespie and Patti Palladin. In the early 2000s, she branched into script writing and directing and towards the end of 2002 she clinched cameo roles with Daryl Hannah, David Soul and Primal Scream.

She designed the costumes for Siouxsie Sioux's 2004 Dreamshow world tour.

In 2006, the Spanish curator Xabier Arakistain invited Hogg to exhibit in the travelling art exhibition Switch on the Power alongside Yoko Ono, Leigh Bowery, Andy Warhol and Kraftwerk. This allowed her to return to the video medium, producing and directing two promos incorporating her clothes and music. She cast a host of friends including Siouxsie Sioux and Alison Mosshart from the Kills to appear alongside her in the new twin collections inspired by shiny metals and reflective surfaces. The resulting videos "Opel Eyes" and "Electricman" were viewed by a whole new unexpected audience via YouTube and Myspace as well as at the exhibition. This direct access and exposure regenerated a newfound interest in Hogg's work.

In 2007, Kylie Minogue appeared in Hogg's black mesh metal-studded cat suit in her "2 Hearts" video, and Siouxsie Sioux wore numerous distinctive Pam Hogg signature cat suits throughout her 2008 tour.

In October 2008, the prestigious fashion store Browns of South Molton Street was the first to stock the new Hogg-Couture collection. She was further asked to dress their windows for Halloween, an honour rarely given to one designer. Hogg's collections were subsequently worn by a new generation of celebrities including Lady Gaga, Jessie J, Kelly Rowland, Tyra Banks, Alice Dellal, Jamie Winstone, Björk, Rihanna, Daisy Lowe, Lily Allen, Peaches Geldof, Naomi Campbell and Claudia Schiffer. In February 2011, Kate Moss, the day after London Fashion Week, wore a Hogg black leather dress to the NME Awards on the same night as Alison Mosshart, wearing a Pam Hogg fur coat, picked up the prize for Hottest Woman.

A wedding dress designed by Hogg for Lady Mary Charteris in 2012 is held by the Victoria and Albert Museum.

In April 2013, Hogg was honoured during "BritWeek" in Los Angeles for her achievements. As part of an art installation featuring British artists from Los Angeles and London, Opfashart, she was given a fashion show; models included Lady Victoria Hervey. In October the same year she won the Creative Excellence prize from the Scottish Council.

Hogg designed the Britannia trophy statuettes for the 2016 Brit Awards.

== Death ==
Hogg died from pancreatic cancer at a hospice in Hackney, London, on 26 November 2025, at the age of 74.
