= Damaris Evans =

British fashion designer

- Born: 18 March 1975 (age 51); London, England
- Education: Central Saint Martins College of Arts and Design
- Labels: Damaris; Mimi Holliday
- Awards: Elle Style Awards (2002, 2003)

Damaris Alice Turle Evans (born 18 March 1975) is a British fashion designer who founded the lingerie brands Damaris and Mimi Holliday.

== Background ==
Evans' father was James Martin Evans (born 1933), a writer who graduated from Peterhouse, University of Cambridge. Her mother was Frances Rachel Evans (Holiday) (born 1939), an artist and the granddaughter of Sir William Rothenstein. Evans has three sisters.

Evans' great grandfather Sir William Rothenstein was Principal of the Royal College of Art from 1920 to 1935. Rothenstein's family were all involved in the arts, one brother being the painter Albert Rutherston and siblings Charles Rutherston and Emily Hesslein both art collectors. Evans' great grandmother was the actress Lady Alice Mary Rothenstein (known professionally as Alice Kingsley), daughter of the Pre-Raphaelite artist Walter John Knewstub and the Pre-Raphaelite muse Emily Renshaw.

Evan's maternal grandmother, Betty Holiday, studied at the Royal College of Art and was a sculptor. Betty Holiday was a contemporary of Henry Moore and Barbara Hepworth. Betty's father, Sir William Rothenstein was Henry Moores mentor at the Royal College of Art.

== Career ==
Evans studied Fashion Design with Print Making at Central Saint Martins College of Art and Design. In 2001, she started her business with a £5,000 loan from The Prince's Trust.

Evans showcased the Damaris collection at London Fashion Week September 2001 and was sponsored by The Prince's Trust. The collection was showcased at London Fashion Week's New Generation, sponsored by the British Fashion Council in September 2003 and February 2004. It received the 'Young Enterprise of the Year' award for the Spring/Summer 2003 collection at Elle Style Awards. In 2005 Evans was invited to Buckingham Palace to meet the Queen for a Celebration of British Design.

The diffusion line Mimi Holliday was then founded in 2004 which went on to introduce Mimi Holliday Beachwear in 2008.
