= Nick Ede =

Scottish television presenter

- Ede in 2015
- Born: Nicholas John Ede; May 1973 (age 53); Edinburgh, Scotland
- Occupations: PR practitioner; presenter; speaker

Nicholas John Ede (born May 1973), best known as Nick Ede, is a Scottish public relations practitioner, popular culture expert and television presenter. He runs the London-based PR agency East of Eden and he lives in Hackney.

== Biography ==
Ede was born in Edinburgh, where he attended Edinburgh Academy. He studied at Glasgow School of Art and Bretton Hall College in Leeds. He moved to Stoke Newington in 1996 to try to become an actor, but his mother died from a stroke in 1997 when he was 22 and he moved back to Edinburgh. He did work for the Stroke Foundation and joined Apollo Leisure in marketing, before moving back to Hackney in 1998 to become head of entertainment at Lastminute.com. In 2000, he became a marketing manager at Mondi Associates, then in 2001 he became head of packages at ATC Management.

In 2003, he did six months work experience at Shine Television, including co-presenting The Russell Grant Show on Sky One. Shortly afterwards, actress Jennifer Ellison asked him to host a party to highlight her appearance on Hell's Kitchen, which was his introduction to PR work. He launched Eden Lifestyle in 2004, then worked with Nick Fulford, merging their businesses in 2006. He was named Scottish Communicator of the Year at the 2009 Scottish Fashion Awards.

He has appeared on Project Catwalk since 2008 (gaining the nickname "the Simon Cowell of fashion"), Diet on the Dancefloor and Lorraine Kelly's morning show LK Today. He holds an annual celebrity fundraising night for the Stroke Association called "A Night with Nick", and is a patron for Jeans for Genes; his father, Donald Ede, was a developmental geneticist.

He created the campaign styleforstroke which has fans including Mel B, Kelly Osbourne, Lilah Parsons, Sarah Harding, Ashley James, Vogue Williams and many more. He has been instrumental is building brands and has worked with the philanthropist Eva Longoria and Maria Bravo.

Recently Ede has appeared as a Matchmaker on the hit TV Show Ultimate Matchmaker on W Channel for UK TV. He is currently an expert on the Yahoo show The Royal Box. In 2018, Ede launched Style For Stroke as a charitable foundation and launched THE FALL BALL - a charity gala to raise funds and awareness for those who have suffered from stroke.

He is openly gay.
