= Kensington Market, London =

Former market hall in the UK

Coordinates: 51.5020°N 0.1895°W

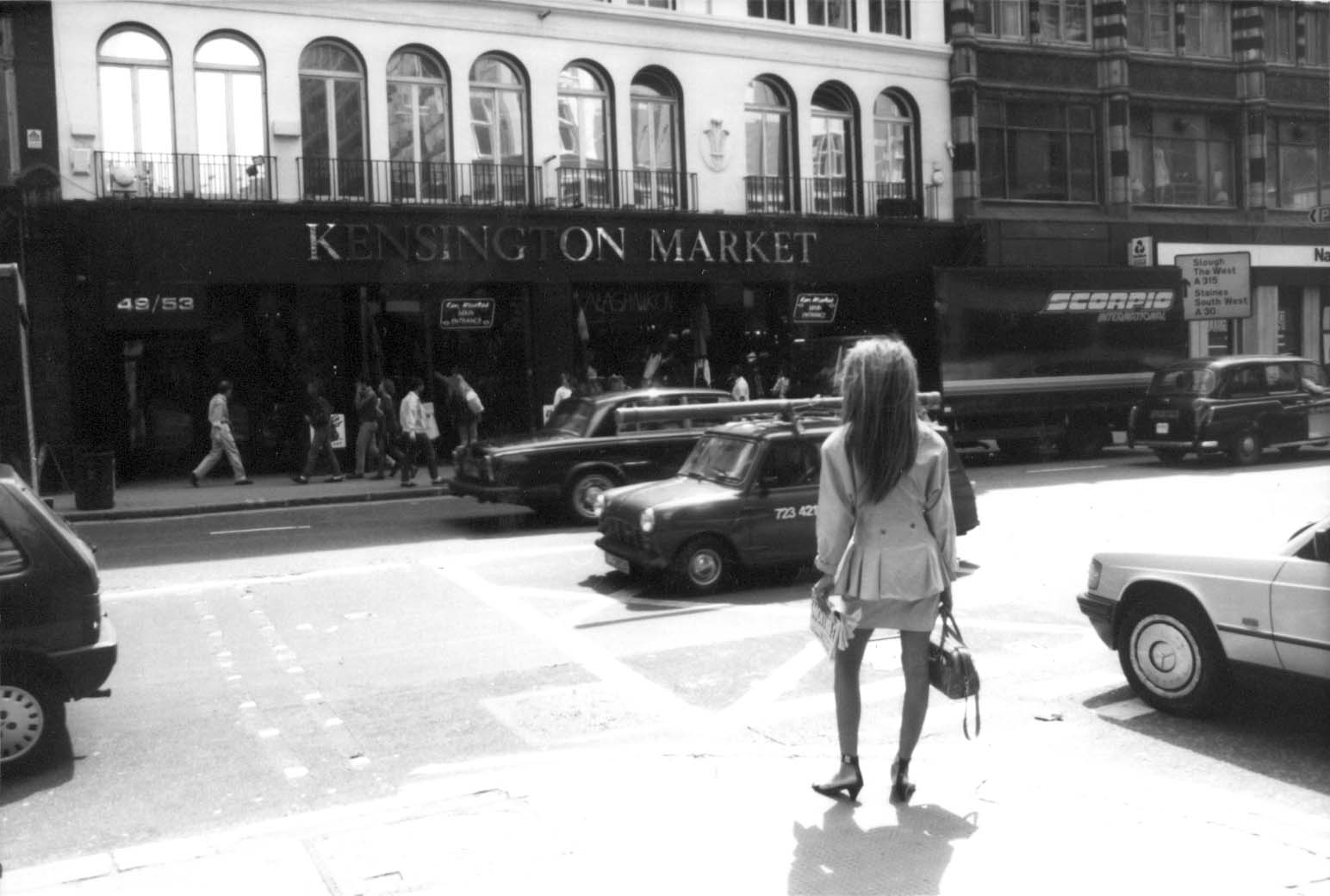
Kensington Market in the 1980s

Kensington Market was a three-story indoor market at 49/53 Kensington High Street, in the Kensington area of London, England. It opened in 1967.

In the 1960s and 1970s, it catered to hippie and bohemian culture. From the 1980s to the end of the 1990s, it catered to punks, new romantics, metal heads, ravers, and goths, as well as other sub-cultures of contemporary music, fashion, hair stylists, body arts, and crafts and accessories.

In 1969, before the band Queen had formed, Roger Taylor ran a stall at the market, also enlisting Freddie Mercury to work on it. In a 2006 interview, Lemmy, the founder of Motörhead, stated he sold dope at the market during the 1960's.

Hyper Hyper was a unit that provided stall space for many new designers, including Fiona Cartledge (Sign of the Times), Pam Hogg, Rachel Auburn and Leigh Bowery, before moving to its own premises across the road in October 1996.

The market finally closed on 29 January 2000. The building was left derelict following its closure, and was demolished in 2001.
