= Katie Hillier =

British fashion designer

- Born: Katie Jane Hillier; 2 May 1974 (age 52); Hammersmith, London, England
- Occupation: Fashion designer

Katie Jane Hillier (born 2 May 1974) is a British fashion designer, mostly of bags and accessories.

== Career ==
Hillier has created bags, jewellery and other accessories for labels including Marc Jacobs, Loewe, Asprey, and Victoria Beckham.

In 2010, she launched her own jewellery label, Hillier.

In May 2013, she became creative director of Marc by Marc Jacobs, but the label closed in March 2015.

In 2015, she launched Hillier Bartley with fellow designer and friend Luella Bartley. Both designers had been creative directors for Marc by Marc Jacobs before they launched their own line, which retails at Liberty, Matches, and Selfridges in the UK, among other locations in the United States, United Arab Emirates, and Japan.

In 2019, Hillier was named creative director of J&M Davidson, and designed her first collection of ready-to-wear and accessories for the brand in autumn of that year.

In 2021, Hillier was appointed as the Creative Director of AHKAH, a Japanese fine jewelry brand. In this role, she led the brand's overall creative direction and designed a new jewelry line called "AHKAH Signature," which debuted in June 2021.

== Personal life ==
Hillier was in a relationship with fellow designer Patrick Grant from 2007 to 2015.

She has been in a relationship with American artist Jeff West since 2016, and they held a commitment ceremony in Kenya on 20 April 2019. They live in Hudson, New York.
