= Ben de Lisi =

American fashion designer

- Born: 31 May 1955 (age 71); New York, United States
- Education: Pratt Institute of Art
- Years active: 1992－

Ben de Lisi (born 31 May 1955) is an American-born fashion designer based in London. He is best known for his collections with high street store Debenhams, and as a mentor and judge on the television series Project Catwalk.

== Early life ==
De Lisi was born in New York and grew up in Long Island. He moved in with his grandmother when studying sculpture at the Pratt Institute in Brooklyn. He became interested in fashion when his grandmother taught him how to sew and recreate a pair of trousers he could not afford to buy.

== Career ==
De Lisi started designing his own menswear range in 1979, and he moved to London in the fashion industry in 1982. He started working with Debenhams in 1992.

De Lisi made his debut at the London Fashion Week in 1994, won the British Glamour Designer of the Year award in both 1994 and 1995. He went on to establish his own company in 1998, which had provided evening dresses for Kate Winslet (2002 Oscars red dress), Helena Bonham Carter and Anjelica Huston. In 2009, he closed his womenswear label as well his flagship London store to focus on his "BDL by Ben de Lisi" collection for Debenhams.

In 1997, de Lisi began designing a successful speciality occasion-wear diffusion line, BDL by Ben de Lisi, in conjunction with Debenhams. In 2009, the collaboration with Debenhams was extended to include a homeware collection based on his own house in Battersea. The collection has a logo based on his first French Bulldog, Ella. He subsequently asked to redesign the Principles range, which became the most successful launch Debenhams has ever made.

In 2010, de Lisi was approached by the Department of Health and offered an open agenda to pick any project he wanted to redesign. Instead of designing a bathroom as assumed, De Lisi helped the NHS to redesign their hospital gown.

== TV appearances ==
He acted as a mentor to budding fashion designers in the British TV series Project Catwalk. He has also appeared on the UK television show Come Dine with Me. In 2010, de Lisi began to make regular appearances in the fashion slot on It Takes Two, the spin-off to the BBC One show Strictly Come Dancing.

== Personal life ==
De Lisi lives in a Victorian cottage by the River Thames close to Battersea Bridge, which he used as the inspiration for his Debenhams homeware range. He has a long-term relationship with Gerardo Vidaurre.

Ben received an honorary doctorate from the University of Northampton, 14 July 2006. On 17 July 2009, de Lisi was conferred with an honorary degree by the Robert Gordon University, Aberdeen.
