= Jasper Garvida =

Filipino fashion designer

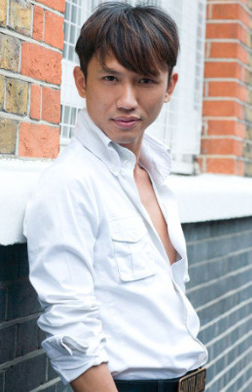
- Born: 3 January 1977 (age 49); Philippines
- Education: Central St. Martins College of Art and Design
- Occupation: Fashion designer
- Label: Éthologie

Jasper Garvida (born 3 January 1977) is a fashion designer.

== Early life ==
He was born in the Philippines, grew up in Canada before moving to London to study Fashion Design at Central St. Martins College of Art and Design. Garvida graduated from Central St. Martins in 2004 with a BA honours in fashion design womenswear.

== Career ==
After graduation, Garvida took the opportunity to work with labels such as John Galliano, Alexander Mc Queen and Vivienne Westwood. Upon graduating, he swiftly gained the role of head designer for Michiko Koshino. In 2008, Garvida was named the winner of Project Catwalk series 3 and established his eponymous fashion label in September 2008, known for its bold, highly embellished womenswear.

In 2009, Garvida was a finalist for Fashion Fringe and debuted his first collection at London Fashion Week. Garvida is now runs his own fashion label Éthologie by Jasper Garvida, a contemporary fashion brand that appeals to those who have a strong sense of individuality.'

Jasper Garvida has exhibited his collection worldwide including Vienna, Toronto, Düsseldorf, London, Paris, and Tokyo. His A/W11 collection was showcased at the British Museum curated by Grayson Perry. The exhibition was formed by a series of images and interactive installation inspired by Harajuku girls. He presented an installation of a hundred models wearing his collections at the Natural History Museum, in the summer of 2010.

In 2013, Garvida was commissioned by the Baselworld (the luxury international watch and jewellery in Switzerland) to design, manufacture and supply outfits for the entire front of house team for the prestigious annual event.

Most recent collections include; the pre-Spring/Summer '15 collection - Resort 2015, Spring/Summer '15 'Gradiva', Autumn/Winter '15 'Unity in Time and Space' and Spring/Summer '16 'When time stands still'. The Éthologie collections have been featured on Vogue UK, The Glass Magazine and have been exhibited at trade shows such as Paris Sur Mode, Zip Zone and Trace Paris showroom. Garvida also shows each season at London fashion week.

Garvida's designs have appeared in Vogue Italia, Russian Vogue, ELLE, i-D, V magazine, Dazed and Confused, The Telegraph, Grazia and other fashion publications. His garments have been seen on Katy Perry, Rhianna, Britney Spears, Florence Welch, Lady Gaga, Elizabeth Hurley, Sophia Coppola, Pixie Lott, Jess Glynne, Cheryl Cole, Sophie Ellis-Bextor, Sugababes, The Saturdays, Girls Aloud and Helena Christensen, to name a few.
