= Robert Cary-Williams =

British fashion designer

Robert Cary-Williams is an avant-garde British fashion designer.

Robert Cary-Williams studied fashion design at Central Saint Martin’s College of Art and Design, and set up his own-name label in 1998. In 1999, he won the British Fashion Council's New Generation Award.

His clothes have been described as experimental, severe, "yet surprisingly wearable." In 2001 he was invited to present designs from his Spring/Summer 2002 collection at the Victoria & Albert Museum for their regular "Fashion In Motion" live shows. This event, held several times a year since 1999, showcases the work of leading current fashion designers. For his presentation at the Museum, Cary-Williams showed historically inspired garments made from antique fabrics combined with leather and rusted metal.
