= Zandra Rhodes =

British fashion designer (born 1940)

Dame Zandra Rhodes DBE RDI
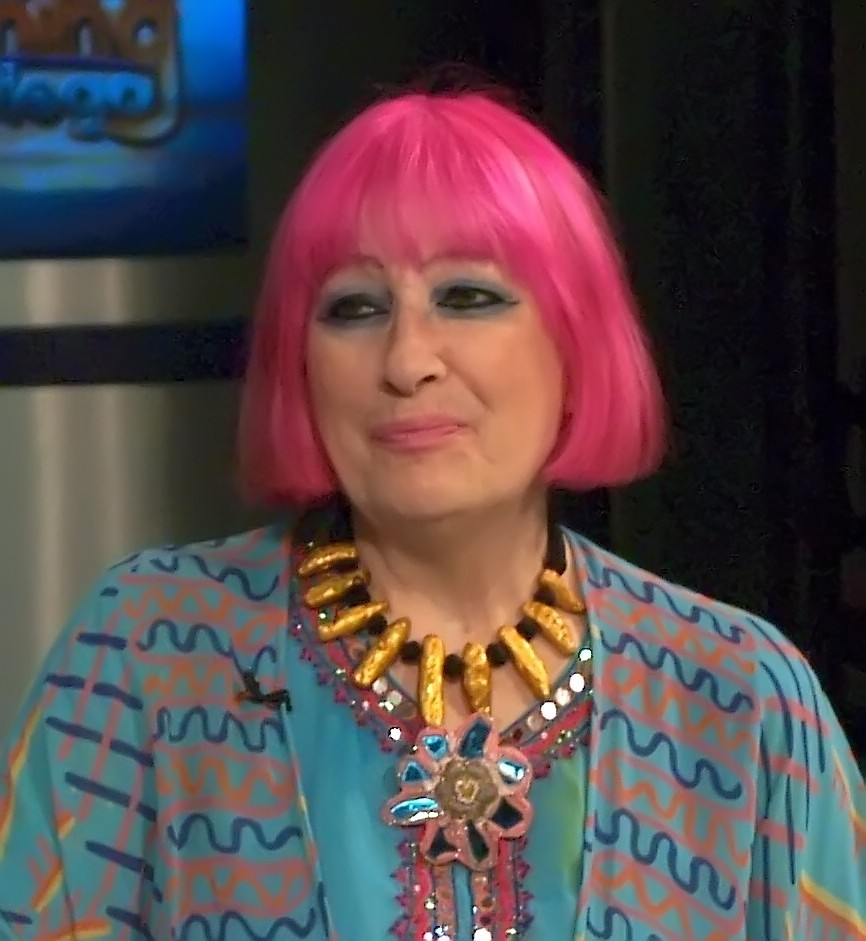
- Rhodes in 2008
- Born: Zandra Lindsey Rhodes; 19 September 1940 (age 86); Chatham, Kent, England
- Occupation: Fashion designer
- Years active: 1968–present
- Partner: Salah Hassanein (1975–2019; his death)

Dame Zandra Lindsey Rhodes DBE RDI (born 19 September 1940), is an English fashion and textile designer. Her early education in fashion set the foundation for a career in the industry creating textile prints. Rhodes has designed garments for Diana, Princess of Wales, and numerous celebrities such as rock stars Freddie Mercury and Marc Bolan. She has also designed textiles for interiors, featuring her prints on furniture and homewares. In 2003 Rhodes founded the Fashion and Textile Museum in London.

Over her 50 year career Rhodes has won numerous awards recognising contribution within the fashion industry, including Daytime Emmy Award for Outstanding Individual Achievement in the Performing Arts – Costume Design 1979, Designer of The Year in 1972 and the Walpole British Luxury Legend Award 2019. A Rhodes dress featured on a commemorative UK postage stamp issued by Royal Mail in 2012 celebrating Great British Fashion.

== Early life and education ==
Rhodes was born 19 September 1940, in Chatham, Kent, England. Her mother was a fitter at the House of Worth in Paris and later became a professor at Medway College of Art, now the University for the Creative Arts, Rochester. Her father was in the air force in Egypt and later became a lorry driver. Three years after Rhodes was born, her mother gave birth to her sister Beverley Rhodes. Rhodes' mother having an occupational background in fashion, the industry was instilled in her as an adolescent; she has described her mother as one of her greatest influences, to whom she owes her career.

Rhodes first studied at Medway College of Art; her major area of study was printed textile design in England. Pop artist Roy Lichtenstein, Andy Warhol, and textile designer Emilio Pucci were a few of Zandra Rhodes' early influences. Textile design instructor Barbara Brown inspired her interest in textile designs during the course of her studies. Rhodes later furthered her education under a scholarship at Royal College of Art. She strayed away from the traditional patterns many designers were producing to create furniture. Rhodes utilised her skill towards designing patterns to create garments. In 1964, Zandra Rhodes graduated with a degree in home furnishing textile design.

== Career ==
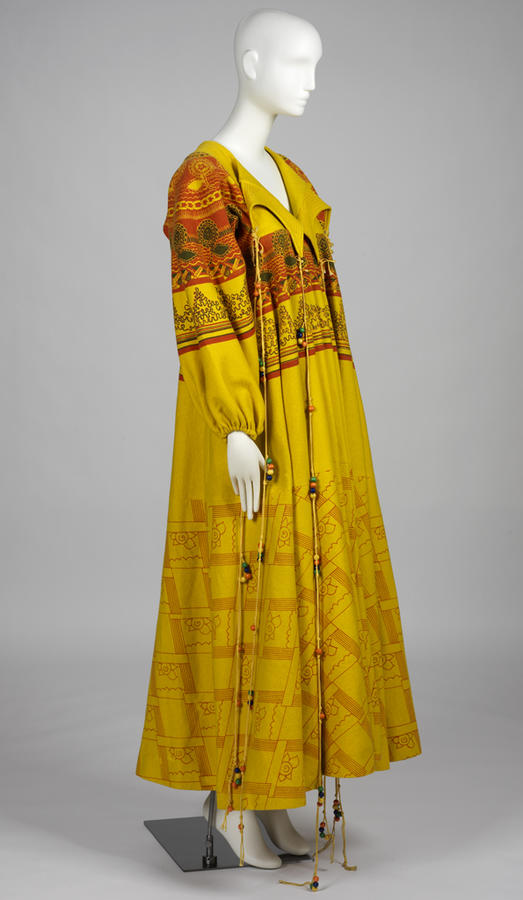
Circular coat, screen-printed yellow felt, 1969. (RISD Museum)

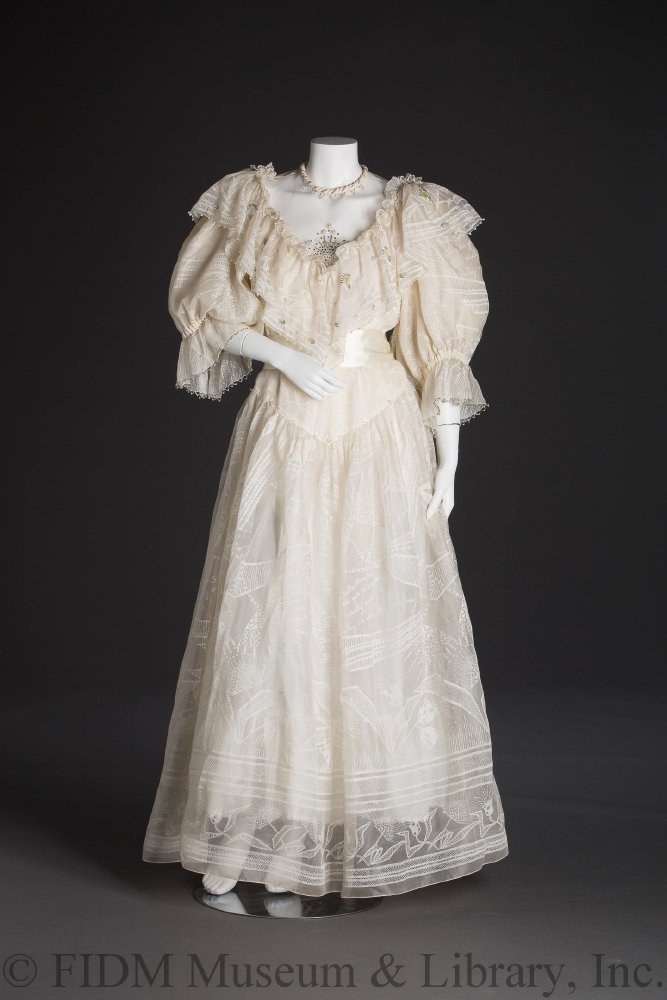
Screen-printed silk chiffon & silk satin evening gown worn by Gloria Vanderbilt, c. 1972 (ASU FIDM Museum)

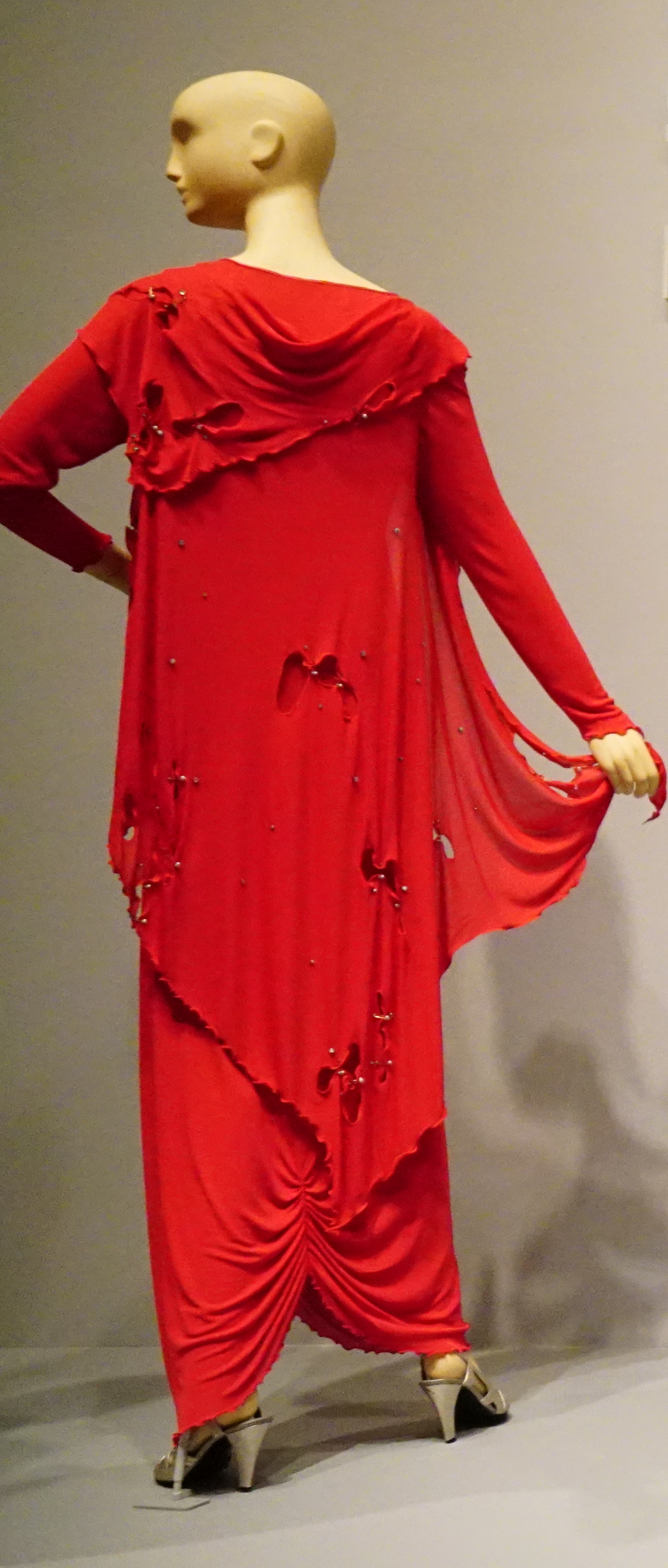
Zandra Rhodes Conceptual Chic evening ensemble, 1977–1978

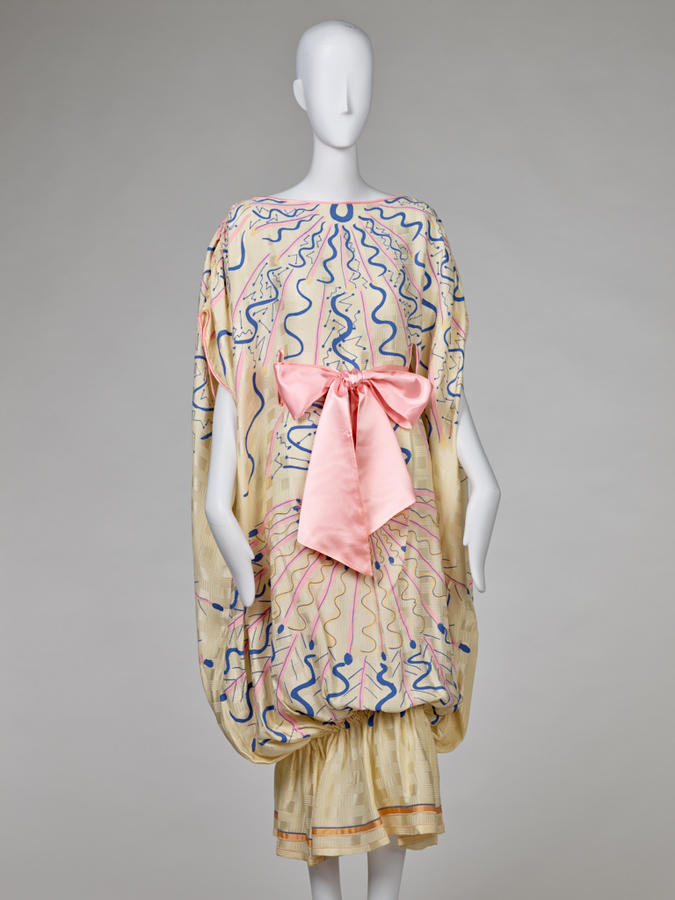
Bubble dress, Autumn-Winter 1978 collection, (RISD Museum)

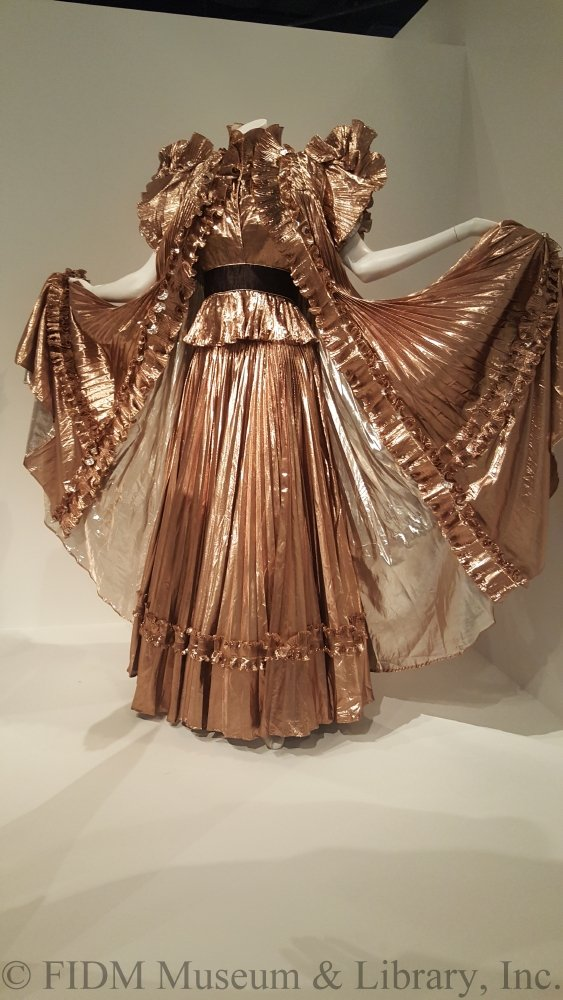
Synthetic gold lamé evening ensemble, "Modern Renaissance" Collection, Fall 1981 (ASU FIDM Museum)

Rhodes' early textile fashion designs were considered outrageous by the traditional British manufacturers, which made it hard to find work. In 1968 Rhodes started a business with fashion designer Sylvia Ayton. The two designers opened a boutique called Fulham Road Clothes Shop. The business allowed Rhodes to create her textile designs onto garments designed by Sylvia Ayton. She produced her first collection showing loose, romantic garments.

In 1969, Rhodes and Ayton went their separate ways, with Rhodes establishing her own studio in Paddington in west London. As a freelancer she released her first solo collection. The collection of garments received recognition from both the British and American market. Marit Allen, editor of American Vogue at the time featured pieces of Rhodes’s collection in an issue. Receiving recognition by Marit Allen persuaded high end retailers like Henri Bendel, Fortnum and Mason, Neiman Marcus, and Saks to purchase her collection. Rhodes's own lifestyle proved to be as dramatic, glamorous and extrovert as her designs. With her hair a vivid shade of bright green (later changed to pink, and sometimes red or other colours), her face painted with theatrical makeup and audacious art jewellery swinging from her neck, ears and arms, she stamped her identity on the international world of fashion.

Rhodes was one of the new wave of British designers who put London at the forefront of the international fashion scene in the 1970s. Her designs are considered clear, creative statements; dramatic but graceful; audacious but feminine. Rhodes's inspiration has been from organic material and nature. Her unconventional and colourful prints were often inspired by travel; chevron stripes from Ukraine and the symbols of the North American Indigenous, Japanese flowers, calligraphy and shells. Her approach to the construction of garments can be seen in her use of reversed exposed seams and in her use of jewelled safety pins and tears during the punk era.

Rhodes created handmade evening wear using her unique feminine textiles. Each garment created incorporates different types of feminine style into place. She made her biggest splash in 1977 with the establishment take on punk, which she called Conceptual Chic. She created dresses with holes and beaded safety pins – 10 years before Versace – to form a sort of embroidery, mixed with loosely drawn figures screen-printed on silk jersey, or on the newly developed Ultra suede fabric. When she creates her garments a lot of thought goes into the construction. Simplistic shapes help mould the foundation of Rhodes's garments. The foundation of the shapes, functions as an enhancer that maximizes the effects of her prints. She achieves this look by using techniques including layering, smocking, and shirring. All of Zandra Rhodes's garments are constructed around the design of her distinct prints, despite being structured around the formation of the dress.

Rhodes designed for Diana, Princess of Wales, and continues to design for royalty and celebrities. She has notably designed costumes for rock musicians, glam rock pioneer Marc Bolan of T. Rex, and Freddie Mercury and Brian May of Queen.

=== Multidisciplinary design ===
Rhodes has branched out from fashion, bringing her textiles into other design disciplines. In 1976 Rhodes designed her first interior home décor collection, licensed under Wamsutta. The collection featured household linens, glassware, cushions, throws, and rugs. Zandra Rhodes also used her signature prints to create, ties, lingerie, and a fragrance. In 1995 she established a studio in California to develop an interior design business.

The San Diego Opera commissioned her to design the costumes for their production of Mozart's The Magic Flute in 2001. In 2004 she designed the set and costumes for the San Diego Opera performance of Bizet's Les pêcheurs de perles. She designed for Verdi's Aida at the Houston Grand Opera and English National Opera. In 2002 Rhodes designed a poster for Transport for London showing the River Thames as a woman wearing London landmarks as jewellery.

Rhodes is the founder of the Fashion and Textile Museum in London, which opened in May 2003. The four-million-dollar project took approximately seven years for architect Ricardo Legorreta to build. The museum provides exhibitions and educational programs for fashion students. Contained in the museum is a library and lecture room that will help immerse people into the ways fashion has impacted society throughout the years. In the first exhibit titled "My Favourite Dress" there are dresses from over seventy fashion designers including Oscar de la Renta, Donna Karan, Valentino, and Giorgio Armani. Zandra Rhodes personally asked each designer to choose one of their favourite dresses for the exhibit. It was important for Rhodes to incorporate other designers into the exhibit so the museum provided a nuance of design besides from her own, although the museum withholds a variety of designers' garments. Rhodes included three thousand of her own original garments, and her sketch books and silk screens. The Fashion and Textile Museum produces shows a year, with changing exhibits. On 22 September 2006 she appeared as herself on the long-running BBC Radio 4 soap opera The Archers. Rhodes received an honorary doctorate from Heriot-Watt University in 2007. She appeared, as herself, in an episode of Absolutely Fabulous during the BBC show's second season. Rhodes was a guest judge for the first episode of the third season of Project Catwalk.

In November 2010, Rhodes was appointed chancellor of the University for the Creative Arts, one of the UK's newest universities and only the second to focus specifically on art and design. An official installation ceremony was held in June 2010 in the Banquet House, Whitehall, accompanied by a fashion show.

Marks and Spencers introduced the upmarket Zandra Rhodes collection, modelled and made by Rhodes, into the bigger stores by late 2009. She has her own collection of jewellery. The Zandra Rhodes jewelry includes five separate collections, which are Oriental Whisper collection, Punk Chic collection, Lovely Lilies collection, Signature collection and Manhattan Lady collection.

A more recent jewellery collection created in collaboration with Adele Marie London, called Zandra Rhodes for Adele Marie, launched in August 2011. This collection features iconic pieces of Rhodes's early textiles work remade as jewellery. Rhodes launched a handbag range made under licence by Blueprint in 2010 and has also collaborated to produce a bed linen range and a new improved outdoor clothing range.

On 26 March 2013, Rhodes launched a Digital Study collection of 500 of her iconic garments from her private archive, as well as drawings and behind-the-scenes interviews and tutorials in her studio. The Zandra Rhodes Digital Study collection was developed through a project led by the University for the Creative Arts and funded by Jisc, making key garments she designed available for student study worldwide.

In September 2021, Rhodes launched a 26-piece homeware collection with Ikea of Sweden, available globally in-stores and online.

== Honours and awards ==
Rhodes was appointed Commander of the Order of the British Empire (CBE) in the 1997 Birthday Honours for services to the fashion industry, and promoted to Dame Commander of the Order of the British Empire (DBE) in the 2014 Birthday Honours for services to British fashion and textiles.

=== Other honours ===
- 1972 Designer of the Year, English Trade Fashion
- 1972 Royal Designer for Industry, Royal Society of Arts
- 1978 Fellow of the Society of Industrial Arts, Moore College of Art Award, Philadelphia
- 1979 Daytime Emmy Award for Outstanding Individual Achievement in the Performing Arts Costume Design
- 1983 British Designer, Clothing and Export Council and National Economic Development Committee
- 1985 Alpha award for Best Show of the Year, Saks Fifth Avenue, New Orleans
- 1986-Women of Distinction Award, Northwood Institute, Dallas
- 1990 Number One Textile Designer, Observer Magazine
- 1995 Hall of Fame Award, British Fashion Council
- 1997 Golden Hanger award for lifetime achievement, Fashion Careers of California College, San Diego
- 1998 Leading Woman Entrepreneur of the World by the Star Group U.S.A., Honor award from the National Terrazzo and Mosaic Association Honor for Del Mar Terrace
- 2006 Montblanc de la Culture Arts Patronage Award
- 2019 Walpole British Luxury Legend Award

== Personal life ==
Rhodes describes former president of Warner Brothers Salah Hassanein (1921–2019) as having been her long-standing partner, and the greatest love of her life, until his death in 2019.

She was arrested for growing cannabis in 1986.

On 30 June 2009, Rhodes crashed her car into a hardware store in La Jolla, California, injuring a woman. Rhodes is a survivor of a rare and aggressive cancer called Cholangiocarcinoma which affects the bile duct. In early 2025 she teamed up with AMMF a bile duct cancer charity to continue to educate and raise awareness of this cancer that generally has an extremely poor prognosis.

== See also ==
- List of Marks & Spencer brands
- fashion houses
- Per Una
- punk era

== Notes ==
- Morgan, Ann Lee (ed.) (1984) "Rhodes, Zandra (1940–)" Contemporary Designers First edition, Gale Research, Detroit;
- O'Hara, Georgina (1986) "Rhodes, Zandra (1940–)" The Encyclopaedia of Fashion Harry N. Abrams, New York;
- Parry, Melanie (ed.) (1997) "Rhodes, Zandra (1940–)" Chambers Biographical Dictionary Sixth edition, Larousse Kingfisher Chambers, New York;
- Crystal, David (ed.) (1998) "Rhodes, Zandra (1940–)" The Cambridge Biographical Encyclopedia Second edition, Cambridge University Press, Cambridge, England;
- San Diego Opera News Release:
- The Art of Zandra Rhodes
- Zandra Rhodes: A Lifelong Love Affair with Textiles

== Sources ==
- Zandra Rhodes profile, make-me-beautiful.co.uk
- Interview, vogue.co.uk
- Profile, University for the Creative Arts website
- Profile, bbc.co.uk

Academic offices
Preceded by New position	Chancellor of the University for the Creative Arts; 2009–present	Succeeded by Incumbent
