= Julien Macdonald =

Welsh fashion designer

Julien Macdonald OBE
- Born: 19 March 1971 (age 55); Merthyr Tydfil, Wales, United Kingdom
- Label: Julien Macdonald

Julien Macdonald OBE (born 19 March 1971) is a British fashion designer from Merthyr Tydfil, Wales, who has appeared as judge on the television programme, Britain & Ireland's Next Top Model. In 2001, he was named "British Fashion Designer of the Year", and on 15 March 2001, was appointed as chief designer at Givenchy (Alexander McQueen's successor). His atelier is at Old Burlington Street, London.

== Business liquidation ==
In July 2023, Julien Macdonald Limited, the fashion label fronted by Julien Macdonald, was placed into creditors' voluntary liquidation. The company’s winding-up proceedings commenced on 12 July 2023, with joint liquidators Alan Coleman and Marco Piacquadio of FTS Recovery appointed to oversee the process. The business had faced financial difficulties following a loss of revenue during the COVID-19 pandemic and the collapse of key retail partners, including Debenhams.

In February 2026, Macdonald returned to London Fashion Week, presenting his autumn/winter 2026 collection at The Shard in London.

== Early life ==
Julien Macdonald was born in Merthyr Tydfil, where he attended Cyfarthfa High School. When Macdonald finished High School he studied Art at The College Merthyr Tydfil, where he developed his design skills with lecturer Martyn Jones. He was taught knitting by his mother and soon became interested in design.

Macdonald was also interested in a career as a dancer, but, instead, studied textiles at the Faculty of Arts and Architecture, Brighton. He then became a student at the Royal College of Art, where he gained a master's degree.

== Career ==
Soon after graduation, Macdonald was recruited by Karl Lagerfeld to work for Chanel, a role that was accompanied with creating knitwear for Alexander McQueen.

In 2001, Macdonald was appointed to the position of chief designer at the Paris Haute Couture house of Givenchy (as successor to Alexander McQueen); and, in 2001, he was named British Fashion Designer of the Year. He forms part of the media profile given to Welsh figures in the Cool Cymru movement.

He was selected by British Airways in 2001 to redesign their cabin crew's uniforms.

In 2014, Macdonald launched an eyewear range in collaboration with Vision Express.

Fur use

Macdonald attracted much criticism for his extensive use of fur, including one incident in which he and Paris Hilton were flour-bombed. He stated in 2006 that fur provides the majority of his revenue and that his label would collapse were he not to use it. In 2017, MacDonald apologized for his previous use of fur, telling Reuters, "You do not need to kill animals to wear nice clothes."

== Celebrity clients ==
Macdonald's dresses have been worn by celebrities including Beyoncé Taylor Swift, Suki Waterhouse, Kylie Minogue and Jennifer Lopez. In 2009 MacDonald was the chief designer for the costumes of Pop group Girls Aloud during their Out of Control Tour.

== Media appearances ==
Macdonald appeared as a judge on the British version of Project Runway, known as Project Catwalk, that was broadcast on Sky One.

In February 2010, Macdonald was appointed as a new judge on Britain's Next Top Model, alongside new host and former supermodel, Elle Macpherson.

In September 2013, MacDonald was revealed as one of the contestants on the dancing competition television show Strictly Come Dancing. Janette Manrara is his professional partner and the designer explained in a 17 September interview: "she’s [Manrara] the one that literally keeps me on my toes ... after only two weeks of training, parts of me hurt that I didn't even know existed." The couple were eliminated in the fourth week of the competition after losing to Countdown presenter Rachel Riley.

== Awards ==
In June 2006, MacDonald was awarded an OBE in the Queen's Birthday Honours for services to fashion.

In May 2016, MacDonald was awarded the GENLUX/BRITWEEK Designer of the Year Award.
