= Zoom =

Zoom may refer to:

== Arts, entertainment and media ==
=== Film ===
- Zoom (2006 film), starring Tim Allen
- Zoom (2015 film), a Canada-Brazil film by Pedro Morelli
- Zoom (2016 Kannada film), a Kannada film
- Zoom (2016 Sinhala film), a Sri Lankan film

=== Music ===
- Zoom (dance music group), a Eurodance group formed in Denmark
- Zoom (The Knack album), 1998
- Zoom (Electric Light Orchestra album), 2001
- Zoom (Noah23 album), 2011
- Zoom (Rachid Taha album)
- Zoom, an album by Alvin Lee
- "Zoom" (Dr. Dre song), 1998
- "Zoom" (Fat Larry's Band song), 1982
- "Zoom" (Jessi song), 2022
- "Zoom" (Lil Boosie song), 2006
- "Zoom", a song by the Commodores from their self-titled album
- "Zoom", a song by Last Dinosaurs from the album In a Million Years
- "Zoom", a song by Red Velvet from the extended play The ReVe Festival 2022 – Birthday
- "Zoom!", a song by Super Furry Animals from the album Love Kraft
- "Zoom", a song by Soda Stereo from the album Sueño Stereo
- "Zoom", a song by Tata Young from the album Temperature Rising
- Zoom In, a 2021 EP by Ringo Starr
- Zoom (formerly Avant Garde), a band formed by Rivers Cuomo and Justin Fisher in 1987

=== Television ===
- Zoom (1972 TV series),
  - Zoom (1999 TV series), a remake of the 1972 series
- Zoom the White Dolphin, a 1971 Japanese–French anime series, of 13 episodes
- Zoom (Indian TV channel)
- Zoom (Israeli TV channel)
- Zoom (Ukrainian TV channel)

=== Other uses in arts, entertainment and media ===
- Zoom! (poetry book), a 1989 poetry collection by Simon Armitage, now Poet Laureate
- Zoom, commonly associated with variations of the Reverse-Flash, an enemy of the DC Comics character the Flash
- Zoom!, a computer game
- Zoom, a wordless children's picture book by Istvan Banyai
- Zoom Schwartz Profigliano, a drinking game often referred to as just "Zoom"
- Zoom, a French photography magazine first published in 1978

== Businesses and organisations ==
- Zoomcar, a carsharing company in India
- Zoom (video game company), a Japanese video-game company
- Zoom Airlines Inc., a former Canadian airline
  - Zoom Airlines Limited, its former British sister company
- Zoom Corporation, a Japanese audio company
- ZOOM Erlebniswelt Gelsenkirchen, a zoological park in Gelsenkirchen, Germany
- ZoomInfo (formerly Zoom Information), an American software company
- Zoom Systems, an American manufacturer of automated retail kiosks
- Zoom Telephonics, an American networking equipment manufacturer
- Zoom Communications, American provider and developer of the Zoom videoconferencing app

== Technology ==
=== Computing ===
- Zoom (software), videoconferencing application
- Page zooming, the ability to magnify or shrink a portion of a page on a computer display
- Zooming user interface, a graphical interface allowing for image scaling
- Digital zoom, an electronic emulation of a zoom lens

=== Optics ===
- Zoom ratio, the maximum relative to the minimum magnification factor of an optical system
- Zoom lens, a lens system with a variable focal length, and hence variable magnification and angle of view
- Zooming (filmmaking), a cinematographic effect
- Maxx Zoom, a camera system

== Other uses ==
- Bergen op Zoom, a municipality in North Brabant, Netherlands
- Billy Zoom (born 1948), American guitarist and founding member of punk band X
- Zoom climb, in aviation
- Zooming (writing skill), especially used in descriptive writing
- ZooMS (zooarchaeology by mass spectrometry), a scientific method that identifies animal species from a protein found in bone and antler

== See also ==
- Xoom (disambiguation)
- Zoom TV (disambiguation)
- Zoom Zoom (disambiguation)
- "Rump Shaker" (song), a 1992 song by Wreckx-N-Effect that features the expression "Zooma-Zoom-Zoom-Zoom" in its chorus
