= Zoomer =

Zoomer may refer to:

== Electronics ==
- Tandy Zoomer, a personal digital assistant
- Zoomer (NES accessory), a joystick peripheral for the Nintendo Entertainment System

== Media ==
- ZoomerMedia, a Canadian media group
- Zoomer Radio, a Canadian Radio station (also known as CFZM)

== Music ==
- Zoomer (album), by Schneider TM
- "Zoomer" (song), a single by the duo Les Jumo
- At Mount Zoomer, album released by Wolf Parade

== Other uses ==
- A former Philadelphia-based restaurant delivery company, now merged with EatStreet
- Honda Zoomer, a motorscooter
- Zach's Zoomer, a roller coaster in Michigan, US
- An alternate name for a member of Generation Z
  - Broccoli haircut, also known as the Zoomer haircut for its association with Generation Z

== See also ==
- Zooomr, a photo-sharing website
- Zoom (disambiguation)
- Zoomers
