= Hanna Bezliudna =

Ukrainian journalist

Hanna Bezliudna Ганна Безлюдна
- Born: 15 July 1972 (age 54); Sumy, Sumy Oblast, Ukraine SSR, Soviet Union

Hanna Vitaliyivna Bezliudna (Ukrainian: Ганна Віталіївна Безлюдна, born on 15 July 1972) is a Ukrainian media manager, producer, and public figure. Starting from 2013 – Head of Inter Media Group, Member of the Supervisory Board of the private corporation "Inter TV Channel", President of the Federation of Employers of Media Industry of Ukraine, Member of the Supervisory Board of the private corporation "Inter TV Channel", Merited Journalist of Ukraine.

Bezliudna has worked on television since 1991. She worked as an editor, editor in chief, television producer, correspondent, including at hotspot of tension. Hanna Bezliudna created and headed the editorial office of the information and analytical service of Inter TV Channel, headed the TV agency “Profi TV” (from 2001 to 2004). Created from scratch and managed television channels K1 and K2.

More than 130 documentaries, nine television series and over 80 television projects, one third of which is cyclical, were produced under Bezliudna’s guidance. Among the projects that are significant for Ukrainian television are annual concerts to the Victory Day (9 May) “Victory. One at All”, concerts to the Independence Day “Dream of Ukraine”, ”Ukraine from A to Z”, broadcasting of Easter and Christmas religious services, the Cross Procession to the Day of Christianization of Rus, projects “Great Ukrainians”, ”Concerns Everybody”.

Bezliudna annually falls into the ratings of the most influential women in the country. In 2017, Bezliudna ranked first in the rating of the most successful women of the Corporate Sector, compiled by Novoe Vremya magazine. Media market experts have described her as the most professional TV manager of Ukraine.

== Biography ==
Hanna Bezliudna was born on 15 July 1972 in the city of Sumy (then – Ukrainian SSR). Holds degree in journalism from Kiev State Taras Shevchenko University.

In 1991 was employed as a show editor with UT-1 TV Channel, eventually moving to work as a journalist and anchor with Studio "Hart". Continued her journalist's career with Ukraine's first commercial TV station UT-3, authoring and hosting a series of high-rating TV shows produced to original formats.

Starting from 1994 – a TV producer with Associated Press TV in Ukraine. Worked in Russia, Kazakhstan, covered First Chechen War in 1994.

In 1997 Hanna Bezliudna was appointed editor-in-chief of the Information and Analytical Service of Inter TV Channel, an unmatched leader in Ukraine's television market [7][8]. In this capacity, she initiated and led the formation of the network's information service and production of the nation's most watched shows like Podrobnosti ("In Details"), Podrobnosti Nedeli ("In Details Weekly"), "Kilometer N", "The Right To Choose", "Freedom on Inter"[9] and others[10] . To date, Podrobnosti ("In Details"), Podrobnosti Nedeli ("In Details Weekly") remain the top-rated news programs in Ukraine

In 1999 Hanna Bezliudna was awarded the title of the Merited Journalist of Ukraine.

In 2001 employed as Chief Production Officer with the TV information agency Profi TV[11] established in 1999. At present, Profi TV[12] has a portfolio of documentaries and TV programs including: “Special Features”, “Village of Glukhovka”, «Not The Boondocks”, and a documentaries series about the European Union “The New Old World”, a widely spoken-of documentary series “The War and Peace”, etc. A number of TV projects were produced on commission of networks in Ukraine and Russia, including NTV, Channel 5 (Saint-Petersburg).

In 2004, new TV channels – К1 and К2 created by professionals from Profi TV under Hanna Bezliudna’s guidance emerge in Ukraine.

In 2005, Hanna Bezliudna is appointed General Director of the Ukrainian Media Company being founder of K1 and K2 channels.

In 2007 — Chief Production Officer of TV channel “Inter”.

In 2012–2014 Member of the Constitutional Assembly.

Since 14 February 2013 – Member of the Supervisory Board of the private corporation "Inter TV Channel" in charge of the TV business development strategy head of Inter Media Group.

Since 14 February 2013 – Director for Development, Inter Media Group (consolidating Inter, Inter+, K1, K2, Mega, NTN, Pixel and Zoom Ukraine TV channels).

In the interview to "Komsomolskaya Pravda in Ukraine" from 2 June 2014, Hanna Bezliudna said that during the year she was planning to expand production of original programs on the Inter TV channel. "I hope that Inter will have its own auteur programs; there will be more high-quality documentary. Previously, information and entertainment television prevailed in Ukraine – or news, or entertainment, or something in between. There were almost no interesting auteur projects. But subjective author's view can be more popular than purchased formats now", she said in the interview. Speaking about the plans for the niche channels development, she told about the planned re-branding of the K1 channel and launch of five new auteur projects. Also the head of Inter Media Group noted the uniqueness of the popular science television channel "Mega", which would continue occupying this niche.

== Public Activity ==
For many sequential years, Hanna Bezliudna's name ranks among the Ukraine's 100 Most Influential Ladies rating published by Focus magazine[14].

In 2011–2016 – Vice-President of the Federation of Employers of Ukraine.

In 2012 Hanna Bezliudna initiated the establishment and chaired the Federation of Employers of Media Industry of Ukraine – an organization aiming to promote interests of business and media owners.
