= Winter Wonderland =

1934 song written by Felix Bernard and Richard B. Smith

- 1934 sheet music cover

Song
- Published: 1934 by Bregman, Vocco and Conn
- Genre: Christmas
- Composer: Felix Bernard
- Lyricist: Richard Bernhard Smith

"Winter Wonderland" is a song written in 1934 by Felix Bernard and lyricist Richard Bernhard Smith. Due to its seasonal theme, it is commonly regarded as a Christmas song in the Northern Hemisphere. Since its original recording by Richard Himber, it has been covered by over 200 different artists. Its lyrics are about a couple's romance during winter.

A later version of "Winter Wonderland" (which was printed in 1947) included a "new children's lyric" that transformed it "from a romantic winter interlude to a seasonal song about playing in the snow". The snowman mentioned in the song's bridge was changed from Parson Brown to a circus clown, and the promises the couple made in the final verse were replaced with lyrics about frolicking. Singers such as Johnny Mathis connected both versions, adding a verse and chorus.

== History ==
Smith, a native of Honesdale, Pennsylvania, was reportedly inspired to write the lyrics after seeing Honesdale's Central Park covered in snow. He wrote the lyrics while being treated for tuberculosis in the West Mountain Sanitarium in Scranton.

In 1968, Tony Bennett recorded the song for his album Snowfall: The Tony Bennett Christmas Album. In 2008, he recorded it again with the Count Basie Orchestra for the album A Swingin' Christmas, while in 2014, he recorded it as a duet with Lady Gaga, released as a standalone promotional single.

In 1971, Elvis Presley recorded the song on his album Elvis Sings The Wonderful World of Christmas.

In 1999, Jewel recorded the song for her album Joy: A Holiday Collection.

In 2003, Ozzy Osbourne and Jessica Simpson recorded a duet version of the song for The Osbourne Family Christmas Special. Mike Rampton of Kerrang! called the cover "completely baffling."

In 2009, Selena Gomez & The Scene covered the song for the “All Wrapped Up: Volume 2” EP.

In 2023, Chlöe covered the song for Amazon Music as part of their Amazon Original Music series. The cover peaked at number 87 on the Billboard Hot 100, making her version of the song the first to enter the chart.

Also in 2023, Laufey covered the song for Spotify as part of their Spotify Singles Holiday series. The cover became the highest-charting version of the song in the Core Anglosphere countries, excluding the United States.

In a November 2025 survey, 18 versions of "Winter Wonderland" were being played on Christmas music radio stations, the second-most of any song after "Have Yourself a Merry Little Christmas."

== Sheet music ==
The sheet music for the song is in the key of E♭ major for the verses and chorus and G major for the first half of the bridge, with a moderate tempo of 72 bpm and a time signature of cut-time, according to Musicnotes.com.

== Awards and achievements ==
In November 2007, the American Society of Composers, Authors and Publishers (ASCAP) listed "Winter Wonderland" as the most-played ASCAP-member-written holiday song of the previous five years, and the Eurythmics' 1987 version as the one most commonly played.

== Charts ==
=== Tony Bennett version ===
Chart (1968–2023)	Peak position
Australia (ARIA)	40
Denmark (Tracklisten)	35
Hungary (Stream Top 40)	34
Ireland (IRMA)	69
Italy (FIMI)	44
Lithuania (AGATA)	98
Netherlands (Single Top 100)	55
New Zealand (RMNZ)	39
Norway (VG-lista)	35
Portugal (AFP)	68
Sweden (Sverigetopplistan)	42
Switzerland (Schweizer Hitparade)	64
UK Singles (Official Charts)	94
US Holiday 100 (Billboard)	87

=== Tony Bennett and Lady Gaga version ===
Chart (2014)	Peak position
US Holiday Digital Song Sales (Billboard)	20

=== Bing Crosby version ===
Chart (2017–2026)	Peak position
Australia (ARIA)	89
Global 200 (Billboard)	125
Hungary (Stream Top 40)	21
Latvia (DigiTop100)	27
US Holiday 100 (Billboard)	66

=== Michael Bublé version ===
Chart (2017–2025)	Peak position
Australia (ARIA)	84
Germany (GfK)	60
Global 200 (Billboard)	142
Netherlands (Single Tip)	5
Portugal (AFP)	118
Sweden (Sverigetopplistan)	83
US Holiday 100 (Billboard)	93

=== Darlene Love version ===
Chart (2018–2026)	Peak position
Global 200 (Billboard)	79
US Billboard Hot 100	40
US Holiday 100 (Billboard)	31
US Rolling Stone Top 100	41

=== Chlöe version ===
Chart (2023–2024)	Peak position
US Billboard Hot 100	87
US Holiday 100 (Billboard)	57
US Hot R&B/Hip-Hop Songs (Billboard)	19

=== Laufey version ===
Chart (2023–2025)	Peak position
Australia (ARIA)	28
Canada (Canadian Hot 100)	55
France (SNEP)	106
Global 200 (Billboard)	70
Greece International (IFPI)	33
Ireland (IRMA)	7
Lithuania (AGATA)	22
Luxembourg (Billboard)	24
Netherlands (Single Top 100)	47
New Zealand (RMNZ)	26
Portugal (AFP)	78
Singapore Regional (RIAS)	9
Sweden (Sverigetopplistan)	91
Switzerland (Schweizer Hitparade)	59
UK Singles (OCC)	18
UK Independent Singles (OCC)	3
US Bubbling Under Hot 100 (Billboard)	2
US Holiday 100 (Billboard)	72

== Certifications ==
=== Tony Bennett ===
Region	Certification	Certified units/sales
Denmark (IFPI Danmark)	Platinum	90,000^{‡}
United Kingdom (BPI)	Gold	400,000^{‡}
^{‡} Sales+streaming figures based on certification alone.

=== Michael Bublé ===
Region	Certification	Certified units/sales
New Zealand (RMNZ)	Gold	15,000^{‡}
United Kingdom (BPI)	Silver	200,000^{‡}
^{‡} Sales+streaming figures based on certification alone.

=== Bing Crosby ===
Region	Certification	Certified units/sales
United Kingdom (BPI)	Silver	200,000^{‡}
^{‡} Sales+streaming figures based on certification alone.

=== Darlene Love ===
Region	Certification	Certified units/sales
United States (RIAA)	Platinum	1,000,000^{‡}
^{‡} Sales+streaming figures based on certification alone.

=== Laufey ===
Region	Certification	Certified units/sales
United Kingdom (BPI)	Silver	200,000^{‡}
United States (RIAA)	Gold	500,000^{‡}
^{‡} Sales+streaming figures based on certification alone.
