= Zoom TV =

Zoom TV may refer to:

- Zoom (Israeli TV channel)
- Zoom (Ukrainian TV channel)
- Zoom (Indian TV channel)
- Zoom TV (Poland)
