= Piddubny =

Piddubny, Piddubnyi, or Poddubny is a surname. Notable people with the surname include:

- Dmytro Piddubnyi (born 2000), Ukrainian footballer
- Igor Piddubny (born 1965), Ukrainian journalist
- Maryna Piddubna (born 1998), Ukrainian Paralympic swimmer
- Volodymyr Piddubnyy, Ukrainian Paralympic athlete
- Aleksandr Poddubny (born 1960), Kyrgyzstani fencer
- Evgeniy Poddubny (born 1983), Russian war correspondent and propagandist
- Ivan Poddubny (1871–1949), Ukrainian wrestler of Russian Empire and later Soviet Union
- Viktor Poddubny (born 1965), Soviet judoka
- Walt Poddubny (1960–2009), Canadian ice hockey player

== Related surnames ==
Language	Masculine	Feminine
Belarusian (Romanization)	Паддубны (Paddubny)	Паддубная (Paddubnaya, Paddubnaja)
Russian (Romanization)	Поддубный (Poddubny, Poddubnyi, Poddubnyy, Poddubnyj)	Поддубная (Poddubnaya, Poddubnaia, Poddubnaja)
Ukrainian (Romanization)	Піддубний (Piddubny, Piddubnyi, Piddubnyy, Piddubnyj)	Піддубна (Piddubna)
