= The Osbournes =

American reality television series (2002–2005)

- Season 4 title card
- Directed by: Donald Bull; CB Harding; Sarah Pillsbury; Todd Stevens
- Starring: Ozzy Osbourne; Sharon Osbourne; Kelly Osbourne; Jack Osbourne
- Theme music composer: Ozzy Osbourne; Randy Rhoads; Bob Daisley
- Opening theme: "Crazy Train" performed by Lewis LaMedica
- Country of origin: United States
- No. of seasons: 4
- No. of episodes: 52 (list of episodes)

Production
- Executive producers: R. Greg Johnston; Jeff Stilson; Sharon Osbourne; Lois Clark Curren
- Producer: Ann Meek
- Cinematography: Robert Erbeznik; Zach Kovek
- Editor: Charles Kramer
- Running time: 24 minutes
- Production companies: iCandy TV; Big Head Productions; JOKS Productions; MTV

Original release
- Network: MTV
- Release: March 5, 2002 – March 21, 2005

The Osbournes is an American reality television series featuring the domestic life of English heavy metal singer Ozzy Osbourne and his family— his wife Sharon, their daughter Kelly, and their son Jack. The series premiered on MTV on March 5, 2002, and, in its first season, was cited as the most-viewed series ever on MTV. The final episode aired on March 21, 2005.

The Osbournes is considered to be a pioneering reality television series which ushered in an era of shows focusing on celebrity family life. The show was developed as a result of the success of the Osbourne family being featured in the September 2000 pilot episode of MTV Cribs.

== Overview ==
The show was filmed from October 2001 to March 2005, and documents the daily lives of the Osbourne family, primarily in their Beverly Hills home. In addition to heavy metal singer Ozzy Osbourne, the show features his wife and manager Sharon, and their children Jack and Kelly. The couple's other child, Aimee, declined to participate in the show and publicly criticised her parents for their antics on the show. In most family photos shown on the show, she is either absent or blurred. The series also followed the family as they dealt with major events such as Sharon's battle with colon cancer, the aftermath of a 2003 ATV accident that nearly killed Ozzy, and Kelly's entry into rehab for addiction to painkillers. In May 2009, Ozzy confirmed in an interview on BBC Radio he was "stoned during the entire filming of The Osbournes" and would not watch the episodes for this reason.

Jack and Kelly's friend Robert Marcato made regular appearances on the show; Sharon took him in during the second season after his mother died of cancer. While a constant presence in front of the camera, few plots revolved around Robert and he had few lines. After the series ended, it was reported that the Osbournes had sent Robert back to Rhode Island to live with his father after spending a week at a psychiatric ward. The Osbournes were assumed to have adopted Robert, but Sharon has denied this. Another person who makes recurring appearances on the show is Melinda, Sharon's Australian-born executive assistant and nanny, married to Ozzy's former tour manager. She is often seen trying to get Jack out of bed while he berates and belittles her, telling her to "get a real job."

Contrary to popular belief, veteran singer Pat Boone never covered "Crazy Train" for the show's theme. The version audiences heard was actually performed by session singer Lewis LaMedica, who flew to Los Angeles specifically for the recording. Boone had previously covered "Crazy Train" for his 1997 album In a Metal Mood: No More Mr. Nice Guy, but this is not used in the series, although LaMedica would adopt Boone's big band style for his own version. Boone, a former neighbour of the Osbournes, later lamented "I'm flattered, but I wish they had used me. I would have done it for free," while the show's executive producer Greg Johnston stated "We never suspected Pat Boone would give us that."

Another common misconception is that Scottish singer Owen Paul was the inconsiderate neighbour who disturbed the Osbournes with an all-night singalong from his own backyard. While he was indeed present during the chaos which saw the family hurl various items—including a large baked ham—into their neighbour's garden, the actual homeowner confronted across the fence was Paul's friend, Charles Lewis. Paul has described this incident as the one aspect of his life that is most frequently misunderstood, claiming "Viewers thought I was [Ozzy's] multi-millionaire neighbour, but the truth is I was staying with a friend."

Concurrent with the success of the series, Kelly launched a brief career as a singer, Jack presented his own series Union Jack, and Sharon hosted The Sharon Osbourne Show. The family also parodied their TV series during cameo appearances at awards shows and in the film Austin Powers in Goldmember.

== Criticism ==
The show was both famous and controversial for the family's frequent use of profanity, which was censored in MTV broadcasts of the series in the United States. In an interview, Ozzy stated that while he was happy that the Canadian broadcasts were uncensored, he preferred the censored version because the cursing was more noticeable due to the bleeps. The Canadian broadcasts on CTV and UK broadcasts on MTV and Channel 4 are uncensored. Some episodes were also aired uncensored to Australian audiences when shown on Network Ten. It is broadcast uncensored on MTV Australia.

== Episodes ==
Series	Episodes	Originally released	
Series	Episodes	First released	Last released
1	10	5 March 2002	7 May 2002
2	22	5 November 2002	11 December 2003
3	10	27 January 2004	4 May 2004
4	10	17 January 2005	21 March 2005

== Staging ==
Jack and Kelly stated in an interview that some of the situations on the show, including the visit from the dog therapist, were arranged by MTV producers. Ozzy Osbourne's publicist denied that any reactions were staged.

== After filming ==
On November 30 and December 1, 2007, items belonging to the Osbournes and featured in the show were auctioned off to the public. The two-day event listed memorabilia as well as furnishings of the home. Bidders could bid through the Auction Network.

In 2009, the Osbournes reunited for the debut of their new variety show Osbournes Reloaded for the Fox network. Produced by Fremantle Media North America, the series debuted on March 31, 2009, at 9:25PM ET/PT, following American Idol. It consisted of sketches, stunts, celebrity cameos, music performances, and pretaped segments. The show was canceled after airing its first episode. On its debut, 26 Fox affiliates pre-empted or delayed the program due to its racy content, which the stations felt was more appropriate for older viewers.

From 2016 to 2018, Ozzy and Jack starred in Ozzy & Jack's World Detour, a reality-series that initially aired on History before moving to A&E for its second season. On January 23, 2018, Jack revealed on his official Instagram page that the series had been picked up for a third season. The eight-episode third season premiered on A&E on June 13, 2018, with Jack's sister Kelly Osbourne joining the cast.

More recently, The Osbournes Want to Believe was released on August 2, 2020, on Travel Channel. The show focused on Ozzy, Sharon and Jack reacting to video clips and photographs purportedly containing supernatural and unexplained phenomena before determining if they are either real, fake or inconclusive.

== Planned revival ==
In October 2015, Kelly Osbourne stated that she was open to the idea of a revival that was new and different, saying that "we did it on MTV and that had never been done before so if we're going to come back, we'd want to do it in a way that has never been done before either."

In August 2025, the BBC announced that it planned to air a documentary called Ozzy Osbourne: Coming Home, which was released on BBC One and BBC iPlayer on 2 October 2025. Filmed over a three-year period, it follows his return to the UK, efforts to perform one last time, and his death shortly after a final concert in Birmingham. Originally planned as a series called Home to Roost, it was released as a one-hour film.

== Broadcast and distribution ==
=== Home releases ===
In July 2002, the Osbourne family secured a $7 million home video deal with Miramax Films to release the first two seasons on DVD through Buena Vista Home Entertainment. Season 1 was released as a single ten-episode set in both censored and uncensored versions, while Season 2 was released in two sets, a single-release version and a double-release version containing the 2.5 DVD.)

=== YouTube ===
Beginning on 29 March 2025, 20 years after the show ended, full episodes were uploaded to The Osbournes' official YouTube channel. Since 16 July 2025, all episodes are available to watch.

=== International airings ===
The series aired on CTV and MusiquePlus in Canada, Channel 4 in the UK and MTV UK and Ireland in Ireland and the UK, VH1 India in India, RTÉ Two in Ireland, Network Ten and MTV Australia in Australia, TV2 Denmark, MTV Finland and Nelonen in Finland, MTV Latin America in Latin America, MTV Portugal in Portugal, TV2 in New Zealand, MTV Germany in Germany, MTV Ukraine in Ukraine, MTV Poland in Poland, MTV Brasil in Brazil, MTV Italia in Italy, MTV Nederland in the Netherlands and MTV Europe.

== Compilation album ==
The Osbourne Family Album, a various artists compilation based on the show, was released in June 2002.

== Awards and nominations ==
As well as achieving the highest ratings in MTV history, The Osbournes won the 2002 Primetime Emmy Award for Outstanding Reality Program.

== In popular culture ==
The retro looking typeface used for the main title is called Swanky and was designed by Stuart Sandler of Font Diner. In the South Park episode "My Future Self 'n' Me", Stan Marsh is watching the show on MTV before his mom changes the channel by force.

== See also ==
- Hogan Knows Best (2005)
- Gene Simmons Family Jewels (2006)
- Rock of Love with Bret Michaels (2007)
