= Igor Piddubny =

Ukrainian journalist, media manager, politician, and film director

- Ігор Миколайович Піддубний
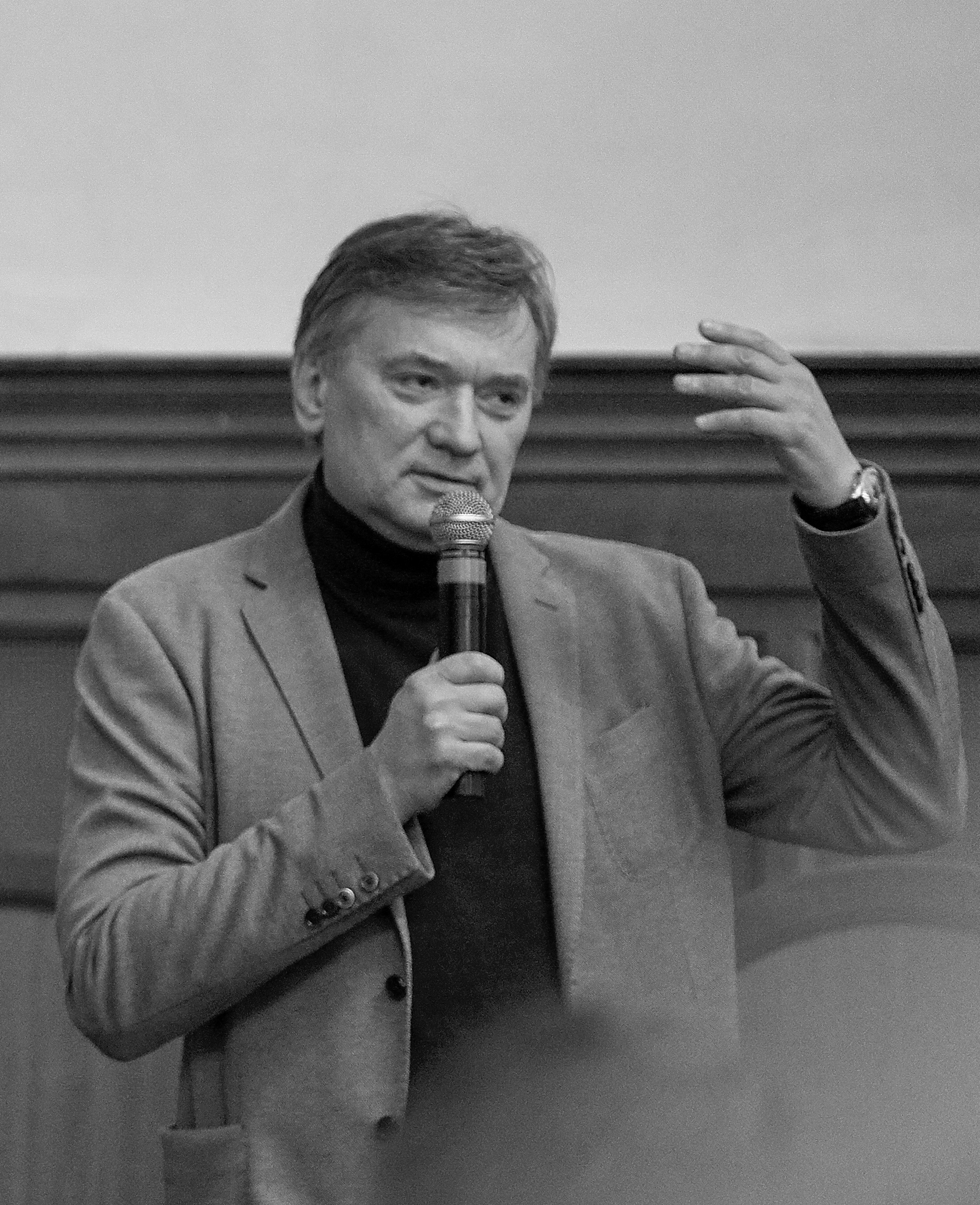
- Born: June 18, 1965 (age 61); Kharkiv, Ukraine
- Citizenship: Ukraine
- Education: Kharkiv National University of Radioelectronics
- Occupations: Journalist; Film director; Politician
- Political party: All-Ukrainian Union "Fatherland" 2005–2015

Igor Piddubny (also spelled Poddubny; Ukrainian: Ігор Миколайович Піддубний; born June 18, 1965) is a Ukrainian journalist, media manager, politician, and film director known for a number of documentaries that covered controversial topics in Ukrainian history and were aimed at Russophone audiences in both Ukraine and Russia. One of these documentaries, which delves into the life of Stepan Bandera, one of the leaders of Ukrainian nationalists, topped the ratings of UA:First, the national television channel in Ukraine, for the year 2015. Piddubny was also one of the founders of Robinzon TV, the first streaming television website in Ukraine. He received Merited Journalist of Ukraine award in 2015.

== Media and political career ==
=== Early career: 1991–1999 ===
Piddubny was born in Kharkiv on June 18, 1965. He graduated from Kharkiv National University of Radioelectronics in 1991, and later took courses in journalism from the University of Vienna.

Piddubny's career in journalism started amid the economic chaos, hyperinflation, and uncertainty that followed the dissolution of the Soviet Union in 1991. In 1992, he worked for the newly formed Kharkiv newspaper ATV and became the deputy head of the Kharkiv office of Nika TV, a newly formed cable television company headquartered in Moscow. As both media projects failed and were restructured, Piddubny moved to the FM radio business. In March 1995, he became CEO of Radio 50, a local radio station, but after a period of media asset consolidation, the station changed its ownership, and in 1997, Piddubny had to leave. He briefly attempted his own advertising business, but returned to radio in 1998.

=== Politics and media: 2000–2010 ===
From the early 2000s, Piddubny partnered with Arsen Avakov, a Ukrainian businessman and politician, identified with the "Orange" political block. The block was then at the core of the opposition Ukrainian politics, mainly formed by Viktor Yushchenko's "Our Ukraine" and Yulia Tymoshenko's All-Ukrainian Union "Fatherland". Piddubny simultaneously headed several media projects sponsored and controlled by Avakov, including TV station TRK Kharkiv News, radio station Novaya Volna, TV and radio company Radio-Artel, etc. Piddubny's longest involvement was with the currently defunct Kharkiv weekly newspaper, Pyatnica, where he served as an editor-in-chief from 2003 to 2011 (in paper format) and then until 2015 when it continued (as an online publication).

After the success of the Orange Revolution in 2005, Avakov was appointed the Governor of Kharkiv Oblast by newly elected president Viktor Yushchenko. However, due to regional political differences, the Orange political block was in the minority in Kharkiv Oblast. Considerable tension grew between centrally-appointed Avakov the two leaders of local government Hennadiy Kernes and Mykhailo Dobkin. Amidst this tension, Avakov-controlled media and Kernes-controlled media continuously attacked their respective opponents. In early 2007, Piddubny's new Opel Signum vehicle parked next to his home was burned in a night-time arson attack. Both Piddubny and Avakov denounced the attack and alluded that only two people could have behind it; however, seven years after the arson, the perpetrators had still not been found.

Meanwhile, in late 2005, Piddubny began his own political career in Kharkiv local government, joining All-Ukrainian Union "Fatherland" in December. In 2006 he was elected to the Kharkiv Oblast Council; later he became the caucus leader for the "Fatherland" minority in the council. In 2009, one of Piddubny's projects in the council was the electronic condolence book of Kharkiv Oblast which aimed to preserve information about local victims of World War II.

In the summer of 2010, Piddubny helped defending Kharkiv's urban forest from the road laying and the associated tree-cutting initiated by Hennadiy Kernes. The attempt to defend the forest failed, however, as the protesters were beaten and their camp destroyed by pro-Kernes titushky, and the road was eventually built. In 2010, Piddubny also served as an assistant to People's Deputy of Ukraine Volodymir Filenko

In the fall of 2010, Ukraine experienced a political shift when Viktor Yanukovych was elected president, reversing the Orange Revolution. In simultaneously held local elections, Piddubny was elected to Kharkiv City Council, but his patron, Arsen Avakov, lost his head-to-head controversial and contested electoral battle with Hennadiy Kernes for the position of Kharkiv mayor. As freedom of the press in Ukraine deteriorated, by 2011, most Avakov-controlled media were forced off the air or out of circulation.

=== Media and politics: 2011–present ===
After the demise of most of Avakov's media, Piddubny remained the editor-in-chief of (online only) Pyatnycya at least until 2015.

By 2012, Piddubny's main project has become Robinzon.TV, the first Ukrainian streaming television website. It utilized YouTube as its underlying platform, and offered a mix of studio programs and live news, often from unpaid stringers armed only with mobile phones. In an interview, Piddubny said that the idea came from a Russian TV channel, TV Rain. He said that rather than create Robinzon.TV as a "political mouthpiece," his aim was something akin to a public broadcasting service. After the Ukrainian revolution of 2014, Robizon.TV was purchased by businessman and politician Yevheniy Murayev.

Piddubny remained in opposition in the Kharkiv City Council; occasionally, his verbal altercations with Hennadiy Kernes attracted national attention. In 2015, Piddubny was re-elected to the Kharkiv City Council; his current term ends in 2020. However, he no longer represents the All-Ukrainian Union "Fatherland", and is listed as an independent member of the Council.

In 2015, Piddubny received the Merited Journalist of Ukraine award from the Ukrainian president Petro Poroshenko. As of 2016, Piddubny considered film-making his primary work.

== Film making ==
Piddubny's career as a film director began in 2010 with an hour-long documentary, Undesirables (Russian: Неугодные), inspired by his work on the electronic condolence book of Kharkiv Oblast. Undesirables spotlights how many contemporary Ukrainians have ancestors who were persecuted by communists or Nazis, resulting in significant omissions in ancestry knowledge. The film was positively received.

Although Piddubny's documentaries deal with Ukrainian history, they are filmed in Russian and specifically aimed at Russophone audiences in both Ukraine and Russia. Piddubny gave two reasons for this decision. First, Ukrainian-speaking audiences know Ukrainian history much better and do not have as many questions (or hold as controversial opinions) as the Russian-speaking Ukrainians. Second, because the Russian audience is considerably larger, Piddubny could make more money.

=== Stepan Bandera: Ukraine between red and black ===
External videos
- Stepan Bandara: Ukraine Between Red and Black, YouTube video

The documentary Stepan Bandera: Ukraine between red and black delves into the life of Stepan Bandera, a militant ideologist of Ukrainian nationalism. The documentary was filmed in 2014 in multiple locations, including Bandera's birthplace, Staryi Uhryniv; other Ukrainian towns associated with Bandera and his followers; Jezkazgan in Kazakhstan (the location of the largest Soviet labor camps for Ukrainian political prisoners); and inside Moscow archives. Like other Piddubny films, it was primarily aimed at the Russophone audiences of Eastern Ukraine and Russia.

The film received overall positive reviews from critics, who thought Piddubny managed to maintain an independent viewpoint free of propaganda for either side, and that such an account of Stepan Bandera was long overdue. Boris Bahteev, a Detector Media critic, believes, however, that Piddubny hadn't completely freed his worldview from the Soviet propaganda and mythology created around Bandera.

The documentary topped the ratings of UA:First, the national television channel in Ukraine, for the year 2015. It gained additional audience on YouTube and on 1+1 TV channel, and is being used in Ukraine in secondary schools as an educational aid. As of 2016, it remained the most-watched Piddubny film.

=== Crimea: Maximum Security Resort ===
External videos
- Crimea: Maximum Security Resort, YouTube video

Premiering in October 2015, the documentary Crimea: Maximum Security Resort is a four-part miniseries that explores 250 years of the Crimean history. It investigates the question who had a more righteous claim to the Crimean peninsula, which was annexed by Russia in 2014. The miniseries received positive reviews from Ukrainian critics.

The miniseries utilizes many previously unpublished NKVD archive documents, prompting Inna Dolzhenkova, a Ukrainian Association of Cinematographers critic, to call the documentary "a painful slap in the face" to Ukrainians who became interested in the history of Crimea only after its annexation.

=== Ivan Mazepa: I appoint you a traitor ===
External videos
- Ivan Mazepa: I appoint you a traitor, YouTube video

Filmed for 18 months between 2017 and 2019, the documentary Ivan Mazepa: I appoint you a traitor explores the life of Ivan Mazepa, a controversial Hetman of Zaporizhian Host who is asymmetrically portrayed in Russian and Ukrainian histories. Piddubny's film crew worked in Ukraine, Austria, Romania, Russia, and Sweden to present a comprehensive image of Mazepa. Two Russian historians, Evgeniy Anisimov and Tatyana Tairova-Yakovleva appeared in the film as consultants.

The documentary premiered in a Kharkiv theater in March 2019. Aside from Ukrainian television, the film was shown internationally within the Ukrainian diaspora in United States and in Europe, including Vienna, Budapest, and Stockholm. In 2019, it received Gran Prix at the historical film festival Poza Chasom and was the subject of masterclasses at the Kharkiv State Academy of Culture.

The documentary received positive reviews from Ukrainian historians Oleksandr Halenko and Sergiy Pavlenko and Russian historian Boris Sokolov The documentary was criticized, however, because it was filmed in Russian rather than Ukrainian.

== Full filmography ==
Original title (in Russian)	Ukrainian title	English title	Year	Ref
Неугодные	Неугодні	Undesirables	2010	
Неоднозначные	Неоднозначні	Controversials	2011	
Живая душа	Жива душа	Living Soul	2012	
Несчастливая звезда	Нещаслива зірка	Unlucky Star	2012	
В августе 43-го	У серпні 43-го	In August 1943...	2013	
Увековечить нельзя забыть	Увічнити не можна забути	Memorialize or Forget?	2013	
Харьков 1941–43. Жизнь как она есть.	Харків 1941–43. Життя як воно є.	Kharkiv 1941–43: Life in the Raw	2014	
Степан Бандера: Украина между красным и чёрным	Степан Бандера: Україна між червоним і чорним	Stepan Bandera: Ukraine between red and black	2015	
Крым. Курорт строгого режима	Крим. Курорт суворого режиму	Crimea: Maximum Security Resort	2015	
Вечный огонь	Вічний вогонь	Eternal Flame	2016	
Иван	Іван	Ivan	2016	
УКРАЯ	УКРАЯ	Borderland	2016	
Возвращение	Повернення	Restitution	2017	
Иван Мазепа. Назначаю тебя предателем.	Іван Мазепа. Призначаю тебе зрадником.	Ivan Mazepa: I appoint you a traitor	2019	

== See also ==
- Merited Journalist of Ukraine
- Cinema of Ukraine
- Media of Ukraine
- Arsen Avakov

== Literature cited ==
- Dorovskykh, Olha (September 21, 2010), Pejic, Nenad (ed.), "Concerns Mount About Press Freedom in Ukraine As Journalist Attacked", Radio Free Europe/Radio Liberty, Prague: United States Congress
- Avakov, Arsen (February 1, 2007), Kostenko, Tatyana (ed.), "Zapugivanie i ugrozy stali normoi v Kharkove" Запугивание и угрозы сталин нормой жизни в Харькове [Intimidations and threats are becoming new norm in Kharkiv], Vecherniy Kharkov Вечерний Харьков [Evening Kharkov] (in Russian), Kharkiv: ТОВ "Редакція газети 'Вечірній Харків'", OCLC 762014020
- Kobzar, Natalia, ed. (September 14, 2011), "Telekanal A/TVK propal iz efira" Телеканал "А/ТВК" пропал из эфира [TV channel "A/TVK" disappears from air], Status Quo (in Russian), Kharkiv
- Kobzar, Natalia, ed. (November 11, 2010), "Film kharkovchanina I. Poddubnogo priznan luchshei dokumental'noy lentoy na festivale "Stupeni"" Фильм харьковчанина И. Поддубного признан лучшей документальной лентой на фестивале "Ступени" [I. Piddubny's film is awarded first place on "Steps" festival], Status Quo (in Russian), Kharkiv
- Mirer, Polina (July 10, 2011), Fedorkova, Tat'jana (ed.), Nichego lichnogo, tolko biznes Ничего личного, только бизнес [Nothing personal, strictly business] (in Russian), Kharkiv: MediaPort
- Mavrichev, Vjacheslav (December 3, 2009), Shapovalova, Juliana (ed.), "Chtoby pamjat' ne zarastala bur'janom. U Har'kovskoj oblasti pojavilas' jelektronnaja kniga pamjati" Чтобы память не зарастала бурьяном. У Харьковской области появилась электронная книга памяти [To prevent memory from overgrowing with weeds. Kharkov region has an electronic memorial book], Ob#ektiv Объектив [Lens] (in Russian), Kharkiv: Simon
- Serdjuk, Anna (July 22, 2014), Shapovalova, Juliana (ed.), "Har'kovskij rezhisser snimet fil'm o Bandere" Харьковский режиссер снимет фильм о Бандере [Kharkiv director will make a film about Bandera], Ob#ektiv Объектив [Lens] (in Russian), Kharkiv: Simon
- Butusov, Jurіj [in Ukrainian], ed. (January 9, 2015), "Ukraina mezhdu krasnym i chernym" Украина между красным и черным [Ukraine between red and black], Cenzor.net Цензор.нет [Censor.net] (in Russian), Kyiv
- Kas'janenko, Rostislav [in Ukrainian], ed. (November 25, 2019), "Poddubnyj Igor' Nikolaevich" Поддубный Игорь Николаевич [Poddubny Igor Nikolaevich], Gorodskoj Dozor Городской Дозор [City Watch] (in Russian), Kharkiv: Dozor.kharkov.ua
- Gorovaja, Inna (June 25, 2010), Annenkova, Ol'ga (ed.), "Rukovoditelem frakcii BJuT v oblsovete izbran Igor' Poddubnyj" Руководителем фракции БЮТ в облсовете избран Игорь Поддубный [Igor Poddubny was elected a head of BYuT faction in the regional council], Novosti Har'kova Новости Харькова [Kharkiv news] (in Russian), Kharkiv: news.kh.ua
- "Har'kovskij rezhisser snimaet fil'm o Bandere" Харьковский режиссер снимает фильм о Бандере [Kharkov director is making a film about Bandera], ROBINZON.TV (in Russian), Kharkiv: Неправительственное информационное агентство Украины ROBINZON.TV, July 30, 2014
- "Fil'my i programmy Igorja Poddubnogo" Фильмы и программы Игоря Поддубного [Films and programs of Igor Poddubny], tv.kh.ua Харьков-ТВ (in Russian), Kharkiv: Kharkiv-TV, 2018
- "Ukaz Prezidenta Ukraїni: Pro vіdznachennja derzhavnimi nagorodami Ukraїni z nagodi Dnja Konstitucії Ukraїni" Указ Президента України: Про відзначення державними нагородами України з нагоди Дня Конституції України [President's Decree: On awarding the state awards of Ukraine on the occasion of the Constitution Day of Ukraine], Офіційне інтернет-представництво Президента України, Kyiv: Office of the President of Ukraine, June 27, 2015
- Losev, Igor (January 16, 2015), Ivshina, Larisa [in Ukrainian] (ed.), "Contra omnes", Den' День [Day] (in Russian), Kyiv: ТОВ "Українська прес-група", OCLC 977515570
- Sventah, Anna (October 23, 2015), Ivshina, Larisa [in Ukrainian] (ed.), "Krym. Kurort strogogo rezhima" Крым. Курорт строгого режима [Crimea. High Security Resort], Den' День [Day] (in Russian) (№192 ed.), Kyiv: ТОВ "Українська прес-група", OCLC 977515570
- Gordejchik, Evgenij, ed. (November 2, 2010), "U Avakova podozrevajut otkuda pojavjatsja "pravil'nye" dannye" У Авакова подозревают откуда появятся "правильные" данные [Avakov's surrogates suspect where the "correct" data will come from], Focus ФОКУС [Focus] (in Russian), Kyiv: Ukrainian Media Holding
- Ruban, Volodimir [in Ukrainian], ed. (December 17, 2014), "Na TV pojavitsja dokumental'nyj serial o Bandere" На ТВ появится документальный сериал о Бандере [A documentary series about Bandera will appear on TV], Gazeta.ua (in Russian), Kyiv: Нова інформація, Телекритика
- "Vsja pravda o poiske ostankov Jaroslava Mudrogo. Novyj fil'm-rassledovanie Igorja Poddubnogo" Вся правда о поиске останков Ярослава Мудрого. Новый фильм-расследование Игоря Поддубного [The whole truth about the search for the remains of Yaroslav the Wise. New film investigation of Igor Poddubny], Glavnoe Главное [The main thing] (in Russian), Kharkiv: Glavnoe.ua, September 5, 2017
- "Rukovoditelem frakcii BJuT v Har'kovskom oblsovete stal Igor' Poddubnyj" Руководителем фракции БЮТ в Харьковском облсовете стал Игорь Поддубный [Igor Poddubny became the head of the BYuT faction in the Kharkov regional council], Glavnoe Главное [The main thing] (in Russian), Kharkiv: Glavnoe.ua, June 25, 2010
- Ovcharenko, Andrіj, ed. (November 2, 2010), "Bat'kіvshhina: V Har'kove rezul'taty podgonjajut pod dannye Dobkina" Батьківщина: В Харькове результаты подгоняют под данные Добкина [Fatherland: In Kharkiv, the results are manipulated to fit Dobkin's data], Korrespondent Корреспондент [Correspondent] (in Russian), Kyiv: UMH group, ISSN 2305-3364, OCLC 53342614
- Gannickij, Mihail, ed. (April 6, 2012), "V Kieve prezentovano pervoe v Ukraine internet-televidenie Robinzon.TV" В Киеве презентовано первое в Украине интернет-телевидение Robinzon.TV [The first in Ukraine Internet television Robinzon.TV is presented in Kyiv], UNIAN УНІАН (in Russian), Kyiv: 1+1 Media Group
- "Ukrainskaja gosudarstvennost' v upadok, no narod ne ischez – istorik o Poltavskoj bitve" Украинская государственность в упадок, но народ не исчез — историк о Полтавской битве [Ukrainian statehood was in decline, but people have not disappeared – a historian about the Battle of Poltava], Samye svezhie novosti Rossii, Ukrainy, Belarusi Самые свежие новости России, Украины, Беларуси [The latest news from Russia, Ukraine, Belarus] (in Russian), qwerty.gdn, June 30, 2019
- Pilipenko, Marina (March 29, 2019), Kostenko, Tatyana (ed.), "Na telekanale R1 – prem'era istoricheskogo detektiva" На телеканале Р1 – премьера исторического детектива [On the P1 channel – the premiere of a historical detective story], Vecherniy Kharkov Вечерний Харьков [Evening Kharkov] (in Russian), Kharkiv: ТОВ "Редакція газети 'Вечірній Харків'", OCLC 762014020
- Kljuchko, Aleksandr (February 7, 2007), Kostenko, Tatyana (ed.), "Podzhog avtomobilja deputata Igorja Poddubnogo: huliganstvo ili mest'?" Поджог автомобиля депутата Игоря Поддубного: хулиганство или месть? [The arson of deputy Igor Poddubny's car: vandalism or revenge?], Vecherniy Kharkov Вечерний Харьков [Evening Kharkov] (in Russian), Kharkiv: ТОВ "Редакція газети 'Вечірній Харків'", OCLC 762014020, archived from the original on September 23, 2021
- Omel'chenko, Oksana, ed. (July 25, 2014), "Har'kovskij rezhisser snimaet fil'm o Bandere" Харьковский режиссер снимает фильм о Бандере [A Kharkiv director is making a film about Bandera], Vesti Вести [News] (in Russian), Kyiv: ТОВ "Вісті Мас-Медіа", OCLC 913568734
- "Krym. Kurort strogogo rezhima" Крым. Курорт строгого режима [Crimea: A High Security Resort], Blini Bioscoop (in Russian), Rotterdam: blinibioscoop.nl, March 12, 2016, archived from the original on December 20, 2016
- Fedorkova, Tat'jana (March 23, 2015), Fedorkova, Tat'jana (ed.), Sovety byvalyh Советы бывалых [Veterans share tips] (in Russian), Kharkiv: MediaPort
- Gokova, Evgenija (March 23, 2019), Shapovalova, Juliana (ed.), "Geroj ili predatel': har'kovchan priglashajut na dokumental'nyj fil'm o Mazepe" Герой или предатель: харьковчан приглашают на документальный фильм о Мазепе [Hero or traitor: Kharkovites are invited to a documentary about Mazepa], Ob#ektiv Объектив [Lens] (in Russian), Kharkiv: Simon
- Musayeva, Sevgіl', ed. (November 2, 2010), ""Bat'kivshhina": rezul'taty "podgonjajut" pod dannye Dobkina" "Батькивщина": результаты "подгоняют" под данные Добкина ["Fatherland": the results are manipulated to fit Dobkin's data], Ukrayinska Pravda (in Russian), Kyiv: Kyiv MediaHub, OCLC 1066371688
- Ermolenko, Oksana (October 20, 2010), Guk, Ol'ga; Panjushkina, Svetlana (eds.), "Kernes: sekretarja smenit Krivcov ili Novak" Кернес – секретаря сменит Кривцов или Новак [Kernes: the secretary will be replaced by Krivtsov or Novak], Segodnya Сегодня [Today] (in Russian), Kyiv: Media Group Ukraine, archived from the original on December 28, 2019
- Makarenko, Anna (December 3, 2013), Guk, Ol'ga; Panjushkina, Svetlana (eds.), "Kernes na sessii prosil uspokoitel'noe dlja oppozicionera i obzyval Bogoslovskuju" Кернес на сессии просил успокоительное для оппозиционера и обзывал Богословскую [Kernes at the session asked for a sedative for a member of the opposition and insulted Bogoslovskaja], Segodnya Сегодня [Today] (in Russian), Kyiv: Media Group Ukraine, archived from the original on December 6, 2013
- Gannickij, Mihail, ed. (April 5, 2012), "Anons na 6 aprelja" Анонс на 6 апреля [Preview for April 6], UNIAN УНІАН (in Russian), Kyiv: 1+1 Media Group
- Migacheva, Elena (November 3, 2010), Gannickij, Mihail (ed.), "Vybory v Har'kove: vopros zhizni i smerti dlja Regionov" Выборы в Харькове: вопрос жизни и смерти для Регионов [Elections in Kharkov: a matter of life and death for the Party of Regions], UNIAN УНІАН (in Russian), Kyiv: 1+1 Media Group
- Alasanija, Zurab [in Ukrainian] (December 14, 2007), Mostovaja, Julija [in Ukrainian] (ed.), "Jeh, hvost, cheshuja..." Эх, хвост, чешуя... [Oh, tails and scales ...], ZN.UA (in Russian), Kyiv: Dzerkalo Tyzhnia, ISSN 1563-6437, OCLC 977906967
- Butusov, Jurіj [in Ukrainian], ed. (January 31, 2007), "V Har'kove podozhgli mashinu deputata i soseda Dobkina" В Харькове подожгли машину депутата и соседа Добкина [In Kharkiv, a deputy's car is set on fire in Dobkin's neighborhood], Cenzor.net Цензор.нет [Censor.net] (in Russian), Kyiv
- Pavlenko, Sergіj [in Ukrainian] (March 28, 2019), "Z novoї dokumentalіstiki pro Іvana Mazepu" З нової документалістики про Івана Мазепу [From new documentary about Ivan Mazepa], Hvilja Desni Хвиля Десни [The Desna Wave] (in Ukrainian), Desna: hvilya.com
- Kosachova, Olga; Kolyakina, Ul'ana (April 19, 2019), "Majster-klas rezhisera Іgorja Pіddubnogo – pokaz fіl'mu "Priznachaju tebe zradnikom"" Майстер-клас режисера Ігоря Піддубного – показ фільму "Призначаю тебе зрадником" [Igor Poddubny: director's master class – screening of the movie "I appoint you a traitor"], Fakul'tet kіno-, telemistectva Harkіvs'koї derzhavnoї akademії kul'turi Факультет кіно-, телемистецтва Харківської державної академії культури [Faculty of Cinema and Television Art of Kharkiv State Academy of Culture] (in Ukrainian), Kharkiv: Kharkiv State Academy of Culture
- Sokolov, Boris (April 14, 2019), Ivshina, Larisa [in Ukrainian] (ed.), "Get'man Mazepa: bez gnіvu j uperedzhennja" Гетьман Мазепа: без гніву й упередження [Hetman Mazepa: without anger and prejudice], Den' День [Day] (in Ukrainian), Kyiv: ТОВ "Українська прес-група", OCLC 977515570
- Vashulenko, Inna (April 30, 2019), Pejic, Nenad (ed.), "Get'man Іvan Mazepa і vіjna na Donbasі. Shho skandal'nogo u fіl'mі "Priznachaju tebe zradnikom"?" Гетьман Іван Мазепа і війна на Донбасі. Що скандального у фільмі "Призначаю тебе зрадником"? [Hetman Ivan Mazepa and the war in the Donbass. What's shocking in the movie "I Appoint You a Traitor"?], Радіо Свобода (in Ukrainian), Prague: United States Congress, Radio Free Europe/Radio Liberty
- Musayeva, Sevgіl', ed. (June 30, 2019), "Ukraїns'ka derzhavnіst' zanepadala, ale narod ne znik – іstorik pro Poltavs'ku bitvu" Українська державність занепадала, але народ не зник – історик про Полтавську битву [Ukrainian statehood declined, but the people did not disappear – a historian about the Battle of Poltava], Ukrayinska Pravda (in Russian), Kyiv: Kyiv MediaHub, OCLC 1066371688
- L'vova, Elena (October 12, 2010), "Har'kovshhina: "regionaly" podbirajut perebezhchikov" Харьковщина: "регионалы" подбирают перебежчиков [Kharkiv region: Party of Regions picks up defectors], UkrRudProm УкрРудПром [UkrRudProm] (in Russian), Kyiv: Ukrrudprom.com
- Nikitin, Anton [in Ukrainian], ed. (June 2, 2010), "V Har'kove izbili zashhitnikov parka, gospitalizirovana zhenshhina" В Харькове избили защитников парка, госпитализирована женщина [Park defenders are beaten in Kharkov, a woman hospitalized], Podrobnosti (in Russian), Kyiv: Inter Media Group
- Kozachenko, Pavel (September 2, 2014), Kas'janenko, Rostislav [in Ukrainian] (ed.), "Evgenij Muraev priobrel internet-kanal Robinzon TV" Евгений Мураев приобрел интернет-канал Робинзон ТВ [Evgeny Muraev acquired Robinzon TV Internet Channel], Gorodskoj Dozor Городской Дозор [City Watch] (in Russian), Kharkiv: Dozor.kharkov.ua
- Zelenskaja, Dar'ja (December 4, 2012), Rumjanceva, Іrina (ed.), "Igor' Poddubnyj: "Robinzon. TV. — 25 chasov sobstvennogo jefira!"" Игорь Поддубный: "Robinzon. TV. — 25 часов собственного эфира!" [Igor Poddubny: "Robinzon TV – 25 hours of your own broadcast!"], Время (газета) (in Russian), Kharkiv: ЗАТ "Врємя"
- Zinenko, Jurij (July 8, 2014), Bogdanova, Oksana (ed.), ""Leksusy" i "Infiniti" har'kovchan podzhigajut s dvuh do treh nochi" "Лексусы" и "Инфинити" харьковчан поджигают с двух до трех ночи ["Lexus" and "Infinity" cars are set on fire from two to three o'clock in the morning], KP (in Russian), Kyiv: UMH group
- Zaharov, Evgenij (June 2, 2010), Zakharov, Yevgen (ed.), "Nochnoe napadenie na zashhitnikov parka v Har'kove" Ночное нападение на защитников парка в Харькове [Night attack on the defenders of the park in Kharkiv], Prava Ljudini v Ukraїnі. Іnformacіjnij portal Harkіvs'koї pravozahisnoї grupi Права Людини в Україні. Інформаційний портал Харківської правозахисної групи [Human Rights in Ukraine. Information portal of Kharkiv Human Rights Group] (in Russian), Kharkiv: Kharkiv Human Rights Protection Group
- Noskov, Vladimir (October 11, 2015), Pejic, Nenad (ed.), "Kto prevratil Krym v kurort strogogo rezhima?" Кто превратил Крым в курорт строгого режима? [Who turned Crimea into a high-security resort?], Radio Free Europe/Radio Liberty (in Russian), Prague: United States Congress
- Magrilov, Igor (July 16, 2016), "Dokumental'noe kino Igorya Poddubnogo" Документальное кино Игорь Поддубного [Igor Piddubny's documentaries], Berlin-Visual (in Russian), Kyiv: Центр политического консалтинга
- Bahteev, Boris (January 8, 2015), Lygachova, Natalia [in Ukrainian] (ed.), "Stepan Bandera: mezhdu chernym i chernym" Степан Бандера: между чёрным и чёрным [Stepan Bandera: between black and black], Detector Media, Kyiv: ГО "Детектор медіа"
- "Stepan Bandera: Ukraina mizh chervonym i chornym" Степан Бандера: Україна між червоним і чорним [Stepan Bandera: Ukraine between red and black], osvitportal.loda.gov.ua (in Ukrainian), Lviv: Lviv Oblast Council, Ministry of Education and Science of Ukraine, December 26, 2018
- Dan'kova, Natalia (January 11, 2016), Vlaschenko, Sergey (ed.), "Novyny, Biatlon i film pro Banderu" Новини, біатлон і фільм про Бандеру [News, Biathlon, and a movie about Bandera], PRportal (in Ukrainian), Kyiv: Центр Политических Исследований
- Dolzhenkova, Inna (October 24, 2015), "Krym vymagae zhertv" Крим вимагає жертв [Crimea comes at a price], ukrkino.com.ua, Kyiv: Ukrainian Association of Cinematographers
- Dolzhenkova, Inna (August 24, 2016), "Film "Ukraya" – provokacia chi shizofreniya?" Фільм "Украя" — провокація чи шизофренія? ["Borderland": Provocation or multiple personality disorder?], ukrkino.com.ua, Kyiv: Ukrainian Association of Cinematographers
