= Xoom =

Xoom may refer to:

- Motorola Xoom, an Android-based tablet computer by Motorola
- Xoom (web hosting), an early dot-com that primarily provided free unlimited space web hosting
- Xoom Corporation, a San Francisco–based digital money transfer company
- Hero Xoom, a series of 110cc, 125cc and 160cc scooters produced by Hero MotoCorp

== See also ==
- Zoom (disambiguation)
