= NTN (TV channel) =

Ukrainian TV channel

- Country: Ukraine
- Headquarters: Kyiv, Ukraine

Programming
- Language: Ukrainian
- Picture format: 576i SDTV

Ownership
- Owner: Inter Media Group

History
- Launched: November 1, 2004; 21 years ago May 2022; 4 years ago (NTN International)

Links
- Website: Website

Availability

Terrestrial
- Zeonbud: MX-2 (15)

NTN is a Ukrainian-language TV broadcaster based in Ukraine. It is a general entertainment channel transmitting daytime programming, sports, and other entertainment programs. It is available as a live stream.

The channel is part of GDF Media Limited, owned by Dmytro Firtash.

Due to the Russian invasion of Ukraine, from February 24 to April 17, 2022, the TV channel broadcast the United News marathon around the clock. There was no advertising on the air. In 2022, Inter Media Group announced the launch of NTN International in May 2022, an international version of NTN.
