= Schneider TM =

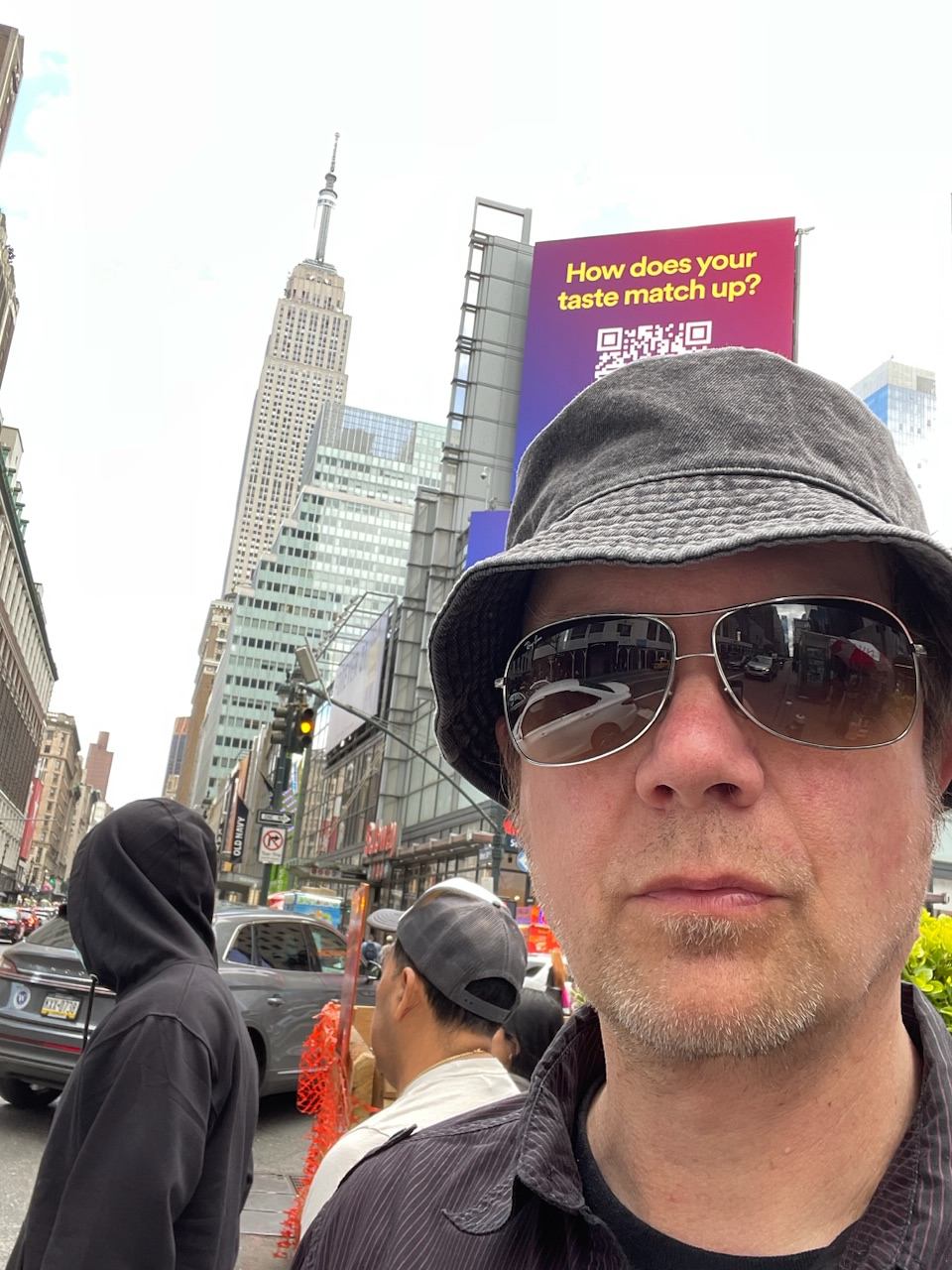
- Manhattan (New York City), 2023

Background information
- Born: Dirk Dresselhaus; 28 August 1970 (age 55); Bielefeld, Germany
- Genres: Independent music, electronic music, pop music, experimental music, post-punk, krautrock, songwriter, sound art
- Occupation: Musician
- Instruments: Multi-instrumentalist, guitar, electronics, vocals
- Years active: 1996 - current (Schneider TM), 1985 - current (Dirk Dresselhaus)
- Member of: Schneider TM, Krautfuzz, Faust, Locust Fudge, die ANGEL, Feedbackorchester (FBO), Kreisfrequenz ((ω)), and others
- Formerly of: Hip Young Things, Sharon Stoned, and others
- Website: www.schneidertm.net

Dirk Dresselhaus (born 28 August 1970 in Bielefeld), better known by his stage name Schneider TM, is a German musician from Berlin.

== Discography ==
Year	Album(s)	EP(s)	Single(s)
1997			"Schneider TM" (12")
1998	Moist (CD/LP)		"Up-Tight" (12"), Masters (CD)
1999			
2000		Binokular (CD/10" w/ Kptmichigan)	
2001			
2002	Zoomer (CD/LP)	6 Peace (CD)	"Frogtoise" (12"/CD), "Reality Check" (12"/CD)
2003			"The Light 3000" (7" w/ Kptmichigan)
2004	Reconfigures (CD/LP)		"The SchneiderTM Experience" (7")
2005	Release (2xCD)		"Dr. Drek" (7")
2006	Škoda Mluvit (CD/ 2xLP)		"Pac Man/Shopping Cart" (7")
2007			"Schneider TM und Lustfaust" (7")
2008			"Jede Nacht" (12“ w/ Station 17)
2012	Construction Sounds (CD/LP)		
2012	Cäcilie Awestruck (20-CD box set w/ Ilpo Väisänen, Kptmichigan, Ronald Lippok, Tomoko Nakasato)		
2012	Live At HBC (limited CD w/ Jochen Arbeit & Claas Großzeit)		
2013	Guitar Sounds (CD/LP)		
2013	Louis & Bebe (download w/ Joanna Dudley)		
2014	撫平塵暴 (Live at N.K., download)		
2014			"Bootleg" (split 12" w/ Automat)
2015	Mobilee (limited CD)		
2016	A S S (CD/LP w/ Jochen Arbeit & Günter Schickert)		
2016	CON-STRUCT (CD/LP w/ Conrad Schnitzler)		
2018	Remainder - Original Motion Picture Soundtrack (LP+CD)		
2019	RA, Schneider TM & Jochen Arbeit (w/ Julia Kent, Lucio Capece, LP/CD/download)		
2021	The 8 Of Space (LP/CD/download)		
2023	Ereignishorizont (LP/CD/download)		
