= Honored Journalist of Ukraine =

Ukrainian distinction

Merited Journalist of Ukraine Заслужений журналіст України
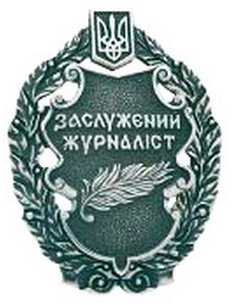
- Merited Journalist of Ukraine badge

Awarded by President of Ukraine
- Type: Order of merit
- Country: Ukraine
- Eligibility: A person with ten years of experience in journalism and a college degree
- Criteria: Vital contribution in Ukrainian journalism
- Status: Currently constituted

Statistics
- First induction: 1982

The Honored Journalist (also translated as The Merited Journalist of Ukraine, Ukrainian: Заслужений журналіст України, romanized: Zasluzhenyi zhurnalist Ukrainy) is an honorary title bestowed by Ukraine (before 1991 by the Ukrainian SSR) for "vital contribution" in the country's journalism. The title is awarded by the President of Ukraine and accompanied by a 35 mm × 45 mm (1.4 in × 1.8 in) silver badge.

== History ==
The honorary title was established by the Supreme Soviet of the Ukrainian SSR on May 7, 1981. By that time, four republics of the former USSR (the Estonian SSR, the Lithuanian SSR, the Georgian SSR, and the Armenian SSR) had already established such an award, whereas the Russian SSR hadn't done so until the dissolution of the Soviet Union. From its inception in 1981, the title required a recipient to have worked in the field of journalism for at least ten years. Originally, a recipient also had to be a member of the "Union of Journalists" of the Ukrainian SSR.

After the dissolution of the USSR in 1991, Merited Journalist of Ukraine was one of 29 honorary titles that newly independent Ukraine inherited from the Ukrainian SSR. Since July 1994, the recipients of the title also receive a silver badge. The first design of the badge, awarded from July 1994 to June 2001, was a 26 mm × 28 mm (1.0 in × 1.1 in) image of a woman's head, wearing a wreath composed of ears of wheat. In June 2001, the silver badge was redesigned to its present form and enlarged to 30 mm × 40 mm (1.2 in × 1.6 in); in 2007, the badge was further enlarged to its present size.

== Prerequisites and procedure ==
As of 2020, the honorary title is awarded in accordance with the Law of Ukraine Regarding the State Awards of Ukraine and the Decree of the President of Ukraine Regarding Honorary Titles of Ukraine. Recipients of the title must have at least ten years' experience in journalism and have a college degree. The decoration is awarded by the President of Ukraine for a candidate's "vital contribution" to Ukraine journalism. The award is accompanied by a 34 mm × 45 mm (1.3 in × 1.8 in) silver badge.

In the case of Ukrainian candidates, recipients are chosen by the Office of the President of Ukraine from lists of journalists submitted by editorial staff of non-profit and commercial media organizations. Then the lists are sanctioned by municipal and regional governments and/or various bodies of the executive or judicial branches. For non-Ukrainian citizens seeking the award, submissions come from the Ukrainian Ministry of Foreign Affairs.

== Notable recipients ==
- Oleksandr Abdullin
- Hanna Bezliudna
- Boris Lozhkin
- Igor Piddubny
- Savik Shuster
- Valentyna Davydenko

== See also ==
- Merited Artist of Ukraine
- Honorary titles of Ukraine
- Media of Ukraine

== Literature cited ==
- Ukaz Prezidenta Ukraїni: Pro vіdznachennja derzhavnimi nagorodami Ukraїni pracіvnikіv zasobіv masovoї іnformacії Указ Президента України: Про відзначення державними нагородами України працівників засобів масової інформації [Decree of the President of Ukraine: On awarding the state awards to media workers], Kyiv: Office of the President of Ukraine, 4 June 2003
- Davidenko, Boris, ed. (18 November 2014), "Abdullin Aleksandr" Абдуллин Александр [Abdullin Alexander], uk:Ligamedia (in Russian), Kyiv: uk:Група Компаній «ЛІГА»
- Ukaz №1870-X: Pro zatverdzhennja Polozhennja pro derzhavnі nagorodi Ukraїns'koї RSR Указ №1870-X: Про затвердження Положення про державні нагороди Української РСР [Decree 1870-X: On adoption of the Regulation on State Awards of the Ukrainian SSR], Kyiv: Ukrainian parliament, 7 May 1981
- Zakon Ukraїni: Pro derzhavnі nagorodi Ukraїni Закон України: Про державні нагороди України [Law of Ukraine Regarding the State Awards of Ukraine], Kyiv: Ukrainian parliament, 5 June 2017
- Ukaz Prezidenta Ukraїni: Pro pochesnі zvannja Ukraїni Указ Президента України: Про почесні звання України [President's Decree: Regarding honorary titles of Ukraine], Kyiv: Office of the President of Ukraine, 5 July 2016
- Zhaleiko, Boris (1972), Prokhorov, Aleksandr (ed.), "Zvanija pochjotnye" Звания почётные [Honorary titles], Bolshaya Sovetskaya Entsiklopediya Большая советская энциклопедия [Great Soviet Encyclopedia], vol. 9 (3rd ed.), Moscow: Советская энциклопедия, LCCN 71485835, OCLC 810278
- Stolbetsov, Oleg (20 July 2018), "V Rossii uchrezhdeno zvanie "Zasluzhennyj zhurnalist"" В России учреждено звание «Заслуженный журналист» [The title of Merited Journalist established in Russia], kursktv.ru, Kursk: Alekhin and Co
- Buzalo, Viktor (2011), "Pochesnі zvannja Ukraїni" Почесні звання України [Honorary titles of Ukraine], Enciklopedіja іstorії Ukraїni Енциклопедія історії України [Encyclopedia of Ukrainian History], vol. 8, Kyiv: Naukova Dumka, pp. 472–473, ISBN 9789660011427, OCLC 1110099116
- Ukaz Prezidenta Ukraїni: Pro vіdznachennja derzhavnimi nagorodami Ukraїni Указ Президента України: Про відзначення державними нагородами України [Decree of the President of Ukraine: On the awarding of state awards], Kyiv: Office of the President of Ukraine, 15 August 2012
- "Bezljudnaja Anna Vital'evna" Безлюдная Анна Витальевна [Bezlyudnaya Anna Vitalievna], uk:UBR (in Russian), Kyiv: Мультимедіа-інвест Груп, 25 November 2019
- Ukaz Prezidenta Ukraїni: Pro vіdznachennja derzhavnimi nagorodami Ukraїni z nagodi Dnja Konstitucії Ukraїni Указ Президента України: Про відзначення державними нагородами України з нагоди Дня Конституції України [President's Decree: On awarding the state awards of Ukraine on the occasion of the Constitution Day of Ukraine], Kyiv: Office of the President of Ukraine, 27 June 2015
