= Valentyna Davydenko =

Ukrainian journalist, poet and artist (born 1955)

- Валенти́на Давиде́нко
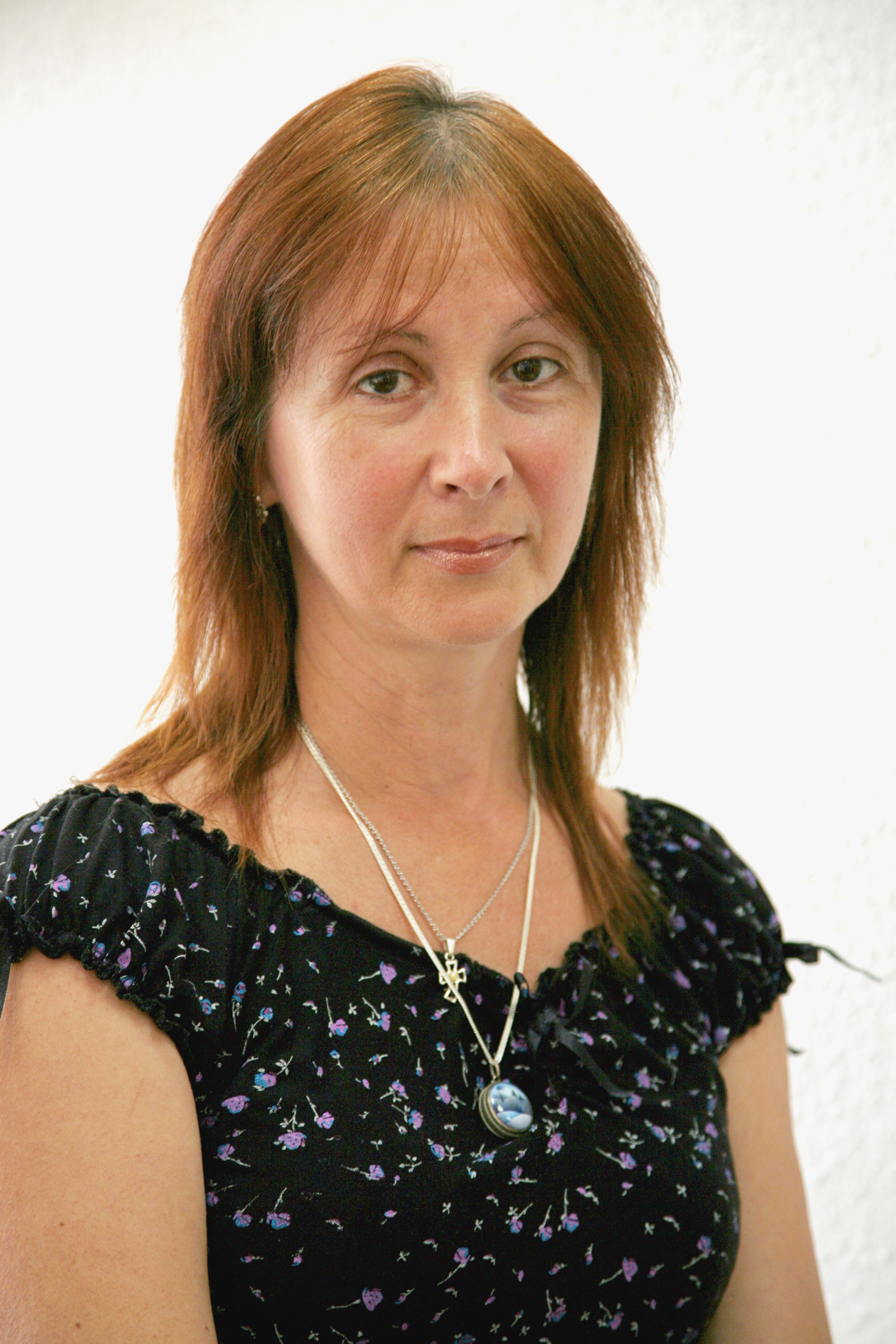
- Valentyna in 2007
- Born: Valentyna Ivanivna Davydenko; 5 April 1955 (age 71); Lesky, Cherkasy Oblast, Ukrainian SSR, Soviet Union (now Ukraine)
- Education: Taras Shevchenko National University of Kyiv
- Occupations: Journalist poet and artist
- Honours: Honored Journalist of Ukraine
- Website: valentinadavidenko.com.ua

Valentyna Ivanivna Davydenko (Ukrainian: Валенти́на Іва́нівна Давиде́нко; born 5 April 1955) is a Ukrainian poet, journalist and artist. As of 2016, she is the author of fourteen TV shows on Ukrainian artists, eight solo art exhibitions, and four volumes of poetry.

== Early life and education ==
Valentyna was born in Lesky, in the Cherkasy Oblast, on 5 April 1955. She received her degree from the Taras Shevchenko National University of Kyiv's Faculty of Journalism in 1977. She works in radio and television journalism after graduating. Head of the Main Editorial Office for TV Radio "Voice of Kyiv" Publicistic Programs. She also became the writer and host of "Voice of Kyiv" radio's popular art shows.

== Works ==
When Valentyna ran upon Roman poet Titiana Colosso at the worldwide Poetry Festival in Kyiv, she volunteered to work with her on the worldwide online poetry publication Formafluens, which she later directed. She initially translated a number of other contemporary Italian authors' poetry into Ukrainian. Her goal is to properly portray the Italian text's stylistic elements, melodies, and figurative language. She has read a lot of poetry since she was a little girl, but have not personally been influenced by literature in any way.

In May 2008, Svetlana Loboda, Marta Vashchuk, Valentyna, and twenty-three other women artisans showcased their canvases and photos during a charity event held at the Ukrainian House.

Valentyna has authored several books on fine arts and culture, including "Formafluens" (2011), "Нічна вежа" (1999), "Зелена зірка березня" (1988), "Флейта Евтерпи" (2004), and "Білу лампу внесу тобі в ніч" (2012). She has also translated modern Italian poets, including Titiana Colusso's "La lingua langue" Roma 2009 and "Казкові світлини" books for children. Additionally, she has participanted in several international painting initiatives and domestic and international events.

Writer and host of twelve television documentaries on modern Ukrainian artists from the "Мистецька мансарда" cycle (TV company ICTV, "Альтернатива"). Together with Ivan Taranenko, they collaborated on several jazz tracks, including "Майстер снів" and "Зеленаві твої небеса". The original song audio CD was made available. Their English-language CD (2007–2011) was subsequently made available in the UK.

== Awards and honours ==
Valentyna has earned the following awards and honours:

- Honored Journalist of Ukraine (2018)
- Member of the National Union of Journalists of Ukraine (1998)
- Member of the National Writers' Union of Ukraine
