= Zoom Zoom =

Zoom Zoom may refer to:

- Mazda catchphrase/trademark
- Joel Zumaya's nickname
- Zoom-Zoom-Zoom, song
- Mazda Zoom-Zoom Stadium Hiroshima
- Zoom Zoom, a character in the animated TV series The Little Green Man
