= Mega (Ukrainian TV channel) =

Ukrainian television channel

Mega Мега
- Country: Ukraine
- Broadcast area: Ukraine
- Headquarters: Kyiv, Ukraine

Programming
- Picture format: 16:9 (576i, SDTV)

Ownership
- Owner: GDF Media Limited

History
- Replaced: Megasport

Links
- Website: http://megatv.ua/about/

Availability

Terrestrial
- Zeonbud: MX-2 (16)

Mega (Ukrainian: Мега), previously known as Megasport, is a television channel in Ukraine, a member of the "Inter" TV-Family. Until 2010, it was known as "Megasport" and positioned itself as a sport channel.

The channel is part of GDF Media Limited, owned by Dmytro Firtash.
