= List of The Osbournes episodes =

The American reality television series The Osbournes aired on MTV from March 5, 2002, to March 21, 2005. It ran for four seasons, with a total of 52 episodes.

== Series overview ==
Series	Episodes	Originally released	
Series	Episodes	First released	Last released
1	10	5 March 2002	7 May 2002
2	22	5 November 2002	11 December 2003
3	10	27 January 2004	4 May 2004
4	10	17 January 2005	21 March 2005

== Episodes ==
=== Season 1 (2002) ===
No. overall	No. in series	Title	Original release date
1	1	"There Goes the Neighborhood"	5 March 2002
The debut episode opens with a brief introduction of the family with a voice-over and scenes of each member. After the introductions, the episode deals with the family moving into their new Beverly Hills home. The family deal with problems that could arise from such a situation - finding valuable furniture broken due to lousy packing and trying to set up the TV with no instructions. Ozzy appears on The Tonight Show with Jay Leno as a performer. Kelly and Sharon come with Ozzy to the show, but Jack stays at home, watching a documentary about marijuana instead. The episode also shows Jack and Kelly's love-hate relationship, and their constant fighting. While the Osbournes are still settling in, Kelly nearly sets the kitchen on fire, and Jack wanders around the background clad in pseudo Army gear in a daze. The two constantly fight, chasing each other around the house. Jack and Kelly then go out clubbing, on Sunset Strip, using fake IDs. Ozzy warns them not to drink or take drugs and to wear condoms if they have sex. In spite of all the problems, Sharon is happy and content that they're finally 'home'.
2	2	"Bark at the Moon"	12 March 2002
The episode starts with a brief scene of Ozzy and Sharon trying to turn on their new vacuum cleaner. Kelly lends a hand and switches on the vacuum, and Ozzy complains about the loudness of the vacuum. The family's numerous dogs has been excreting far too many times in the house, and ruining valuable furniture in the process. The worst dog is Lola, a bull dog which belongs to Jack. Lola has already demolished a valuable sofa. Sharon threatens Jack she'll give Lola away. Jack says Lola is demolishing the furniture because Kelly has bought a new cat into the house, and Lola is angry. Kelly gets busted for not stopping at a stop sign while driving, and is not far from having her license taken away. Elijah Wood and his sister Hannah visit the Osbournes. Lola does a massive 'crap' in Ozzy and Sharon's bedroom and urinates on the family sofas. Sharon threatens to give the dog away but later decides to hire a dog trainer. The dog trainer says that the dogs are spoiled rotten and untrained, and briefly trains Lola. As the dog trainer leaves, Lola urinates on a carpet. It is revealed Kelly has bought two cats, and Ozzy sees them. His yell of horror can be heard beyond Beverly Hills...
3	3	"For the Record"	19 March 2002
Ozzy releases his first solo album in six years. Ozzy and Sharon arrive at an in-store gig. Ozzy signs autographs and takes photos with fans, including an entire squad of security guards. Afterwards, Ozzy and Sharon go to KROQ-FM and have an interview on Loveline. Jack listens to the interview over the radio in a friend's car. Ozzy and Sharon discuss their sex life, and how Ozzy has been using Viagra excessively because he had been 'shooting blanks'. Jack winces in embarrassment as the Osbournes go on to say how Ozzy would get 'hard' at inconvenient times when Sharon is sleeping and not interested. On the day Jack goes to camp, Melinda tries to wake up Jack. But Jack is very depressed for some unknown reason and it becomes a struggle for Melinda to get him up. Jack manages to get to the school bus in time and is off to camp, but Sharon is very worried that Jack may need medication. Afterwards Sharon and Kelly take a private flight to New York to be with Ozzy. Ozzy appears on a TRL show with daughter Kelly, who is told backstage not to swear on stage. Kelly's 17th birthday is coming up and Sharon has arranged a themed party back at home. While going over the development of Kelly's party, Sharon gets a call from Jack's school that Jack is coming back from camp. Jack had been complaining that he didn't like the students, he threw rocks at students and tents and he cursed at the school captain. The morning after her 17th birthday party, Kelly reveals to Ozzy that she has a tattoo on her hip. Sharon is disappointed and says she's a very stupid person. Ozzy finishes the episode saying, with advice about tattoos, that he doesn't want an eagle on his daughter's buttock.
4	4	"Won't You Be My Neighbor?"	26 March 2002
Kelly complains that elder sister Aimee had booked her a gynaecologist appointment. Ozzy thinks it's a practical joke. The Osbournes have new neighbours, and they had been playing loud European dance music late at night. Sharon confronts them over the fence and tells them to go in their "perfectly big house" to play their music. The neighbours refuse to go inside, and Ozzy declares war. One night the neighbours play camp songs, and Jack finally has enough. He plays Meshuggah (whom he erroneously refers to as a "death metal [band] from Norway") on full volume to upset the neighbours. It wakes Kelly who comes running out of the house and throwing tantrums. Next, Jack and Sharon start throwing ham across the fence. This catches the attention of the police, and they tell Sharon they are powerless to do anything about the loud noise UNLESS they are there when it happens. They also warn the family not to throw "the good food" over the fence, and to call them when the neighbours start playing up again. Ozzy, who had been sleeping through all this, awakes and grabs a piece of firewood and throws it over the fence. Even though Sharon insists that he throws the fruit. Something smashes, the cops come back and they all run into the house!
5	5	"Tour of Duty"	2 April 2002
Ozzy is working out with a personal trainer in preparation for an upcoming tour. Sharon talks with a friend over the phone saying that the original name for Ozzy's tour was going to be 'Black Christmas', but was inappropriate because of the 9/11 attacks and its aftermath, so they renamed it 'Merry Mayhem'. Sharon adds that Ozzy will come on stage in a sleigh that will go around the stadium. On a day off, Sharon and Kelly go on a shopping spree at Saks Fifth Avenue, and loses Ozzy's credit card in the process. Panic-stricken, Kelly takes the blame for the missing card and frantically searches her car and finally finds it under the driver's seat - in the middle of the night. The next day, Ozzy goes to band rehearsal for the tour, warning that guitarist Zakk plays louder than Satan. Later, he does a Moulin Rouge skit for more promotional purposes. Ozzy prepares to leave for tour, and Sharon remarks that he finds it very stressful when embarking on a tour. During the rehearsal, Sharon shows to Ozzy all the special effects for the shows. Ozzy is angry by all the special side effects, thinking it will distract the fans from his music. He refuses to perform two nights in a row with the silly special effects. He says Sharon only cares about the money rolling in. Somehow Sharon persuades him to do the two shows anyway, and they become a success.
6	6	"Trouble in Paradise"	9 April 2002
Ozzy is touring while Sharon returns home, planning to reunite with Ozzy in Houston because she misses him so much. Kelly complains about her twisted ankle after falling into a hole exactly the same size as her foot. When Sharon and Ozzy reunite in Houston, Ozzy says he had injured his leg during a concert. Back at the house, Jack and nanny Melinda are at each other's throats. Melinda blames Jack's moodiness on him being tired and sticking to a busy schedule, which is hardly true. Jack parties out late, orders pizza in early morning, sleeps in, and plays games. Melinda calls Ozzy and Sharon and says that Jack has left the house and hasn't returned for hours. She's worried that Jack might be dead out there. Ozzy contacts Jack on his mobile. He tells Jack it's no such big deal to apologise to Melinda for being bratty. Jack refuses to apologise anyway, not wanting to appear sensitive and mushy. Ozzy eventually returns home and despite a broken leg, he has to fetch the cat while walking around the dangerous unfinished pool. He wanders around the backyard until Sharon finally comes to help. Both Sharon and Ozzy become fed up with Jack and Kelly's constant partying and bringing friends over in the middle of the night. They order a family meeting and despite concerns that Kelly would cause problems, it is Jack that becomes outraged and leaves the meeting.
7	7	"Get Stuffed"	16 April 2002
Ozzy mixes alcohol with the pain medication for his foot injury and winds up stoned. He tries to take Lola for a walk, but Sharon sends Jack to retrieve him. The Osbournes suffer through a miserable Thanksgiving. Ozzy works on the video for his song "Dreamer," and adamantly refuses to wear a bat coat. Kelly grows frustrated when the media continually mentions Jack's work with Epic Records, as she feels they are implying that she isn't doing anything with her life. She angrily insists that she actually discovered the band that Jack is helping, and that he hasn't given her any credit. She turns to Ozzy for sympathy, but he isn't quite sure what he wants her to say. Ozzy grows fed up with the family and insists on returning to the tour alone. Sharon, Jack and Kelly decide to surprise him in Chicago for his birthday. They hide from him until his birthday because they fear he would become angry if he saw them before his birthday dinner. When the event finally arrives, Ozzy is surprised and pleased to see his family.
8	8	"No Vagrancy"	23 April 2002
Jack invites his friend Jason Dill, a professional skateboarder, to stay at the house after he is kicked out of the home of yet another of his friends. Ozzy and Sharon are more than a little put off by the fact that Jack just lets Dill come over without telling them, let alone asking for permission. Dill is obnoxious and slovenly, and creeps out Ozzy and others with his habit of always scratching his head. Dill also smokes and drinks a lot, and Sharon is annoyed to find a bottle of Jack Daniels with his belongings. She decides that she is going to urinate in the bottle, but Kelly pleads with her not to do this. Dill accidentally starts a fire in the kitchen, doing damage to a pan and the stove top. Jack is irritated by the fact that Dill is the only one who doesn't seem to be helping clean up the mess, although Dill points out that he would only make things worse. Ozzy and Sharon finally persuade Jack to ask Dill to leave the house. Jack is upset when Sharon and Ozzy give away Lola because she keeps leaving horrific messes around the house. Jack tries to make arrangements to spend time with the dog on weekends, but Ozzy finally agrees to let Lola come back to the house, provided that Jack looks after her.
9	9	"A Very Ozzy Christmas"	30 April 2002
The Osbournes are packing their stuff at the Peninsula Hotel in New York, and Sharon tells Ozzy and Jack that one of their tour truck drivers had an accident the other day. He was getting a blow job from a hooker he had picked up, and was driving in the nude. Later they are on a tour bus driving around New York, and Sharon is informed that Michael, their security guard, had been arrested for robbing a house behind theirs. Ozzy immediately suspects that Michael may have stolen his jewelry. Ozzy embarks on his last promotional concert for his new album in New York. Back at the hotel, Ozzy is flabbergasted when he sees all the designer branded shopping bags Sharon has. Ozzy, Sharon, and Jack return home, managing to get all the bags onto the plane. When Christmas finally arrives, presents are exchanged, and the Osbournes are paid a visit by Ozzy's son from his first marriage, techno DJ Louis Osbourne. For dinner, Ozzy repeats: "We did really great with that gravy!" and Sharon sighs: "We're gonna hear about this fucking gravy for the next year". Ozzy opens a champagne bottle, and almost breaks something when the cork flies across the room. Sharon starts talking about Christina Aguilera's album 'My Kind Of Christmas'. Jack flips Kelly the finger for no reason. Kelly pouts, gets up, and leaves the dining room. After the dinner, Jack's and Kelly's girlfriends visit and talk with the Osbournes in the sitting room. Jack gets a pocket knife from one of his friends for Christmas. He plans to go out with it, but Sharon and Ozzy warns that if he goes out with an army-style haircut, a tee with 'Cocaine' on it, and holding a pocket knife, he will get arrested by the police. The day after Christmas, Sharon and Kelly meet up with Michael, their security guard. Michael explains how he had never been in the house behind theirs and never took anything.
10	10	"Dinner with Ozzy"	7 May 2002
The episode starts with Ozzy sitting in his dining room and enjoying dinner and recounts a time when a stray cat entered their house. Note we actually hear and see Aimee (Whose face is blurred due to her not wanting to participate in the show) in this segment. Ozzy then introduces and discusses Sharon, and there scenes of her giving him a breath strip. The next scene shows Sharon kissing and snuggling Ozzy while Jack tries to watch TV. Then, Ozzy talks to Kelly and Melinda about being put in jail for stealing. Ozzy then starts to talk about Jack. Jack is then shown walking around with a rifle and wearing army gear. Kelly then complains that "15-year-old boys shouldn't be playing with rifles and knives" She then brings up an old situation in which Jack had shot Kelly with a pellet gun six years earlier and she still holds a grudge. Ozzy then briefly talks about how much Kelly and Jack fight, and that they should outgrow it. In the next scene, it's revealed that Jack hasn't gotten up to go to school. Ozzy walks into Jack's room, wakes him up, and tells him that he has to go to school. Ozzy then talks about Sharon disliking cooking. This brings up a scene with Kelly complaining to her mom that she doesn't cook. Ozzy then says that the first thing that attracted him to Sharon was her laugh. Then a scene is shown with Sharon and Kelly talking about their chests. Ozzy then comes back and says that Kelly doesn't take after her mom and she definitely doesn't take after Ozzy. Ozzy comes back again and says that people think he lives in a Bavarian castle like a bat, but he does chores like everyone else. He is then shown grinding coffee, collecting firewood, and making microwave popcorn. Then Ozzy says that sometimes he feels invisible. Ozzy then finishes his dinner with a cup of tea and a montage of scenes from the season is shown. Ozzy then says, "That's the way we are. We're The Osbournes. I love it."

=== Season 2 (2002–03) ===
No. overall	No. in series	Title	Original release date
11	1	"Catching Up with the Osbournes"	5 November 2002
Season 2 starts off with a recap of the first season.
12	2	"What Goes Up..."	26 November 2002
Sharon and the dogs are in the backyard. Lola then vomits on the grass. Ozzy then tries to show off his knife-throwing skills by trying to throw knives into logs. As Jack is in the car going somewhere, he makes a call saying there are fans on the lawn and the sprinklers should be turned on to scare them away. Sharon then shows Melinda a gold filling that she had accidentally swallowed. Ozzy then announces that he and Sharon have been invited to Washington D.C. for a press dinner at the White House. Ozzy doesn't know how to handle it as he doesn't know proper etiquette; he's a street guy. Sharon helps Ozzy pick out a watch to wear to the dinner. Jack then announces that Kelly has covered Madonna's "Papa Don't Preach" and that she would be singing it at the MTV Movie Awards. This leads to a scene of Ozzy dancing with Kelly while the song plays in the background. Jack then tells us that he had a part in Kelly getting signed to a record contract and Kelly discusses that she doesn't want a chick band. Ozzy and Sharon leave to go to Washington D.C. and Sharon tells Ozzy that she got President Bush some cuff links as a gift. Ozzy asks how she's going to give Bush a gift. Ozzy says that "He's the President, he's not allowed to accept gifts." They arrive in Washington D.C. and drive past the Washington Monument and Lincoln Monument. Sharon admits that she doesn't know who President Bush is and that Ozzy is starting to get stage fright. Back home, Jack continues his playful attitude with the fans and the sprinklers. Kelly then goes to rehearsal and she steals Jack's spritz bottle. Jack tells Kelly, "Just because you have a hit song doesn't mean you can steal my spritz bottle." Back in Washington, Ozzy and Sharon are getting ready for their dinner and Sharon says that Ozzy "looks like Harrison Ford." Ozzy says he looks more like Glenn Close. He then calls Sharon a cunt, but then quickly apologizes. He then looks into the camera and says, "I found out you can say anything to a woman. But you mention the "C" word and you suddenly get this feeling of death come over you." At the dinner, President Bush says: "What a fantastic audience we have tonight. Washington power brokers, celebrities, Hollywood stars, and Ozzy Osbourne." This causes Ozzy to stand up with a big smile on his face and the crowd applauds him. Ozzy then flies to England as Sharon joins Kelly and Jack. At the movie awards, all the attention goes to Kelly, while Jack is on a quest to find Natalie Portman. Ozzy introduces Kelly and she does a great performance. That night on the ride home they pass a McDonald's and Jack is happy to see that the McRib is back. This irks Kelly and he tells Kelly that it's the little things in life that make people happy. The episode then ends with Jack continuing his antics with people outside his house with sprinklers as Kelly flies to New York to promote her album.
13	3	"Must Come Down"	3 December 2002
Sharon recuperates at the family's Malibu beach house while undergoing treatment for colon cancer. She vows to beat the disease, and tries to maintain as normal a life as possible. Everyone talks about their reactions to the news of her diagnosis. Ozzy struggles to remain sober while on tour with Ozzfest. He had already been going through detox, and the news of Sharon's illness has made a difficult situation much worse. A family friend/employee tries to help Ozzy by helping him get into yoga and reading him poetry, but Ozzy is decidedly less than impressed. Some people try to talk to him about how religion helped them overcome their addictions, but he does not want any part of it. He is terrified by the prospect of losing Sharon, and doesn't want to be away from her. However, he elects to tough it out and stay on tour because he doesn't want to cause Sharon any further stress. Ozzy comes home for a few days during a break in the tour. Sharon tries to have a fire going in the fireplace for his arrival, but it ends up getting a little bit out of control. Jack takes up surfing while on vacation. He and his friends jump off a pier, but Jack winds up breaking his elbow.
14	4	"The Ozz Man and the Sea"	10 December 2002
Kelly travels to Europe for a series of interviews and appearances. She is upset when her bag is lost (apparently seized by security because of concerns over her gun-shaped pin), leaving her without any extra underwear. She first visits Germany, where she deals with several adoring fans and tries to fake her way through a radio interview conducted in German ("That's amazing. I always don't know what to say"). Kelly then goes to England to perform "Papa Don't Preach" on Top of the Pops. Jack heads to North Carolina to film a guest spot for Dawson's Creek. Sharon is depressed about the fact that everyone is away at the same time. Ozzy tries to cheer her up by building a fire outside the beach house so that she can spend some time outside. The fire department gives him some advice on building a pit for the fire, but the ocean is not very cooperative ("Fuck! Go to Alaska! No, no, no, no. You fucking asshole ocean! No!"). When the fire finally gets going, Ozzy gives Sharon a good laugh when he tries to catch a fish in the ocean—and ends up falling on his butt.
15	5	"Beauty and the Bert"	17 December 2002
Kelly begins dating Bert McCracken, lead singer of the band The Used. Sharon worries after hearing some stories about Bert ("They call him cauliflower dick. Cauliflower dick!? Dont you get that from virg-, virginia, virginial, Venereal disease mum. Venereal disease! Why do I keep thinking fucking virginial?"), while Jack thinks that Bert is weird because he professed his love to Kelly after only a few weeks of dating. Kelly warns that she will run off to Vegas and marry before the end of the year. Sharon actually encourages this, saying that she needs some excitement. Sharon worries about the situation, but Ozzy encourages her to relax and just focus on living one day at a time. Sharon wants Bert to stay at the house (and sleep in Jack's room) when his band comes to town. Kelly refuses to bring him over to meet the family because she fears they will threaten or embarrass him. She finally tries to sneak him into the house, but Sharon catches them. She asks Bert about his nickname, leaving Kelly mortified. Meanwhile, Ozzy has more problems with the television set, which winds up stuck on a cooking channel (or the Bread Baking Channel, as he calls it). He develops a strange fascination for the series Two Fat Ladies.
16	6	"Smells Like Teen Spirits"	7 January 2003
Sharon makes amends with her father after not speaking with him for over twenty years. Kelly keeps going out and getting drunk every night, despite Sharon's pleas. Ozzy tries to warn her of the consequences of her actions, as they can't protect her if she gets arrested for underage drinking. Pop star Mandy Moore comes over to the house to hang out with Jack. Jack also spends a lot of time partying, and ignores his trainer's repeated efforts to get him to change his lifestyle. Kelly and Robert annoy Ozzy when they disturb his sleep with their loud, drunken behavior. Sharon's father tries to give her advice on how to rein in the kids. Kelly becomes very ill after drinking too much, and claims that she is going to stay in all weekend. Sharon intentionally tortures her throughout her hangover by talking about disgusting food items. Ozzy becomes a grandfather when his oldest daughter, Jessica, has a baby girl. Ozzy later becomes addicted to burritos ("Your father can't eat just 1 burrito, he has to have 900 burritos").
17	7	"Meow Means No!!"	14 January 2003
Kelly recruits her friend Sarah to play the drums in her band. However, Sarah has never had any formal lessons, and can't seem to keep up with the others during rehearsals. Everyone becomes very frustrated, and reaches the conclusion that Sarah must be replaced by someone with more experience. Kelly can't bring herself to fire her friend, so Sharon volunteers to handle it. Sarah gets $10,000 for her services, and a job handling the slate during the filming of Kelly's video for "Shut Up." Dill returns to town, and Jack invites him to stay at the house. Ozzy is not thrilled about this, but doesn't stand in his way. Dill and Jack engage in a political debate that seems to bore the rest of their friends. They later engage in a bizarre wrestling match in the driveway that finds them stripping half-naked. One of the dogs, Arthur, becomes too frisky as he deals with leftover "feelings" after being fixed. The family believes that Arthur has raped Gus the cat, although a veterinarian insists that this is impossible.
18	8	"It's a Hard Knock Life"	21 January 2003
Kelly grows frustrated with all of the appearances she must make as a recording artist. She yells and screams at everyone. Sharon sympathizes with her, noting that she just wants to be a teenager and is having a hard time handling all of the demands being placed on her. She asks Ozzy to go talk to Kelly and reassure her. Kelly quickly sends him scampering away as she throws a screaming fit. Kelly flies to New York to work on her album. She does a photo shoot for Vanity Fair, and ends up storming off and having another tantrum. She later meets P. Diddy at a party. He asks her to be his guest and gives her an expensive watch as an apology after one of his security guards knocks her down. Sharon becomes fascinated with the idea of becoming P. Diddy's mother-in-law, and embarrasses Kelly by refusing to stop talking about it. Ozzy and Kelly listen to some of her songs together. He tells her that she has done well and expresses his pride. Meanwhile, Jack has problems with a band that he is trying to sign, as the guitar player is very reluctant to hand over the demos.
19	9	"Cleanliness Is Next to Ozzyness"	28 January 2003
Ozzy grows increasingly tired of the dogs and their tendency to defecate in the house. Because Sharon's immune system is very weak due to the chemo, he fears that all of the germs will cause her to develop an infection. He constantly cleans everything and tries to get everyone to wear gloves around Sharon. He also urges Sharon not to let the dogs on the bed, but she ignores him. Ozzy meets with a contractor about plans to build an outdoor kennel for all of the dogs, but Sharon quickly kills this idea. Jack and Sharon argue when she insists on going out to dinner. He believes she should rest, but she is feeling well and can't stand to be cooped up in the house. Sharon takes Robert shopping for furniture for his new room. She explains that Robert was a good friend to Aimee and Kelly after the Osbournes moved from England, so they have taken him in after his mother's death (from colon cancer). Jack bonds with Robert and shows him how to make one of his favorite treats, beans on toast. Sharon goes to the doctor. At a special dinner that night, she announces that her cancer is in remission and that she will finish her treatment in January.
20	10	"Viva Ozz Vegas"	4 February 2003
The Osbournes pack their bags for Sin City as Ozzy prepares for a concert and Kelly celebrates her 18th birthday. Before heading to Vegas, Kelly discovers that she has been made to sign a contract with The Venetian Resort Hotel Casino as the hotel clearly states that if anyone is seen to be drinking underage, then they would all be thrown out of the hotel. The family charter a private jet to Vegas. When Kelly and friend Sara head out for a wild night on the town, Jack gets left behind because he's still not of legal age. Jack is deeply annoyed by this as he had been told by a friend that they would all be meeting "some Penthouse chicks" while in Vegas. As Jack watches television with some friends, Kelly and Sara run wild. Shocking onlookers with a revealing table dance before falling to the floor in front of a disapproving Ozzy and Sharon, Sara horrifies onlookers shortly before Kelly and Jack go toe-to-toe.
21	11	"My Big Fat Jewish Wedding"	11 February 2003
Sharon and Ozzy decide to renew their wedding vows at a hotel on New Year's Eve. Kelly is to serve as flower girl, with Jack and Robert as ushers. Kelly objects to the fact that the ceremony will be conducted by a rabbi; although Sharon's father is Jewish, Kelly insists that a person cannot be Jewish unless their mother is (Sharon: "Excuse me, my husband is circumcised"). Ozzy is not at all enthused about the ceremony. Kelly and Sarah are less than impressed with Jack's latest female "friend," particularly because she once dated Jack's best friend. Sharon catches the girl in bed with Jack, and later finds condoms in the room. She tries to encourage Jack to settle down and find a steady girlfriend, but he would rather juggle several girls because the idea of a relationship freaks him out. Ozzy and Jack have various body parts plucked, shaved and waxed before the wedding. Sharon recalls the couple's first wedding night, when Ozzy passed out drunk in the hallway. Ozzy insists that he will not drink this time. Sharon recites her own vows, leaving Ozzy clearly touched. The hotel hosts a celebrity-filled reception. Sharon is especially excited about the presence of Justin Timberlake. She asks him to marry Kelly. Ozzy gets completely plastered, causing mayhem such as making out with Marilyn Manson. History repeats itself, as Ozzy falls asleep on a couch and Sharon laments that she has again been cheated out of her wedding night.
22	12	"What a Boy Wants"	10 June 2003
The Osbournes struggle to come up with a gift for Jack's birthday that he will actually like. Kelly strongly objects when Jack dances with Christina Aguilera at a club, whom Kelly had previously insulted on a number of occasions. Kelly complains that Jack is disrespecting her by hanging around someone that she dislikes, and insists that she would never do this to Jack. Jack tries to explain that Christina actually had nice things to say about Kelly. The kids get into a brawl, which Sharon must break up. Meanwhile, Ozzy visits the dentist and gets intoxicated from the nitrous oxide, and he appears to take the rinse water and tries to pour it over his right ear. The family visits the Medieval Times Dinner and Tournament in Buena Park to celebrate Jack's birthday. Sharon ends up buying him a knight suit there, complete with sword. Jack later tries out his new sword by dueling with a buddy in the street.
23	13	"Flea's a Crowd"	17 June 2003
The pets suffer from a flea infestation, creating havoc around the house and leaving everyone itchy and miserable. Kelly prepares to go on a trip to Philadelphia to visit her boyfriend, Bert. Sharon does not want her to go away alone (she prefers her to have security at all times), and drives Kelly crazy as she somewhat jokingly nags her. Sharon has Robert and Jack move a heavy statue out to the garden, but never seems satisfied by the location. She forces them to move it several times. The main family room is redecorated due to the flea infestation and Ozzy finds himself extremely bewildered by a giant statue of a hand placed near the middle of the room. Kelly goes against her parents' wishes and gets a nose ring, which Sharon wants her to remove. Kelly later mistakes the nose ring for something on her nose and accidentally flicks it out.
24	14	"Run Ozzy Run"	24 June 2003
Ozzy continues to work out with his trainer, Pete, who Ozzy jokes may be a robot because he never stops talking, sweats, eats or goes to the bathroom. Ozzy is to run five miles on his 54th birthday. He runs almost two miles before he is stopped by a foot injury. The family throws a party for Ozzy's birthday, complete with a fireworks display by Jack and Robert. Ozzy eventually tries to run the five miles again, and succeeds this time. Meanwhile, Ozzy has problems with his new car, as the voice recognition system can't understand a word he says.
25	15	"Fists of Fury"	1 July 2003
Ozzy and Sharon prepare to leave for a few days on a Hawaiian vacation. Ozzy tells Jack that he is no longer to have people over at the house after 11 PM. Kelly is afraid that Jack will turn the house into a nonstop party while their parents are gone. Sharon promises to talk to him, but this does little to reassure Kelly. Jack has a lot of people over late at night, and they soon begin using the pool and making a lot of noise. Kelly becomes very upset because she is tired of Jack and his friends keeping her from sleeping. He refuses to listen to Melinda when she asks them to be quiet. When Kelly confronts Jack, he dares her to hit him, so she nails him in the face. They get into a fight, and the staff has to pry them apart. Kelly calls Sharon for sympathy, but Jack gets on the line and complains about the cuts to the face he sustained from the punch. Kelly feels Jack deserved what he got; Melinda agrees somewhat, but warns Kelly to be careful about her temper. Sharon and Ozzy come home, and Sharon teases Kelly about the incident. Kelly and Jack quickly patch things up, as they hang out in the kitchen and share some Easy Mac.
26	16	"Mama, I'm Staying Home"	8 July 2003
Ozzy decides to stay home while Sharon, Melinda and the kids travel to New York. Sharon hopes that Ozzy and Robert will spend more time together, but the two mostly avoid one another because they have little in common. Robert spends a lot of time listening to music and dancing in his guest house, and Ozzy cannot get one of the songs out of his head. Ozzy buys a lot of kitchenware, and spends over $600 on candy for Sharon. Meanwhile, Melinda learns that she is pregnant, and annoys Kelly by talking about her pregnancy nonstop. Kelly also gets into a playful wrestling match with Sharon.
27	17	"Tennis Racket"	15 July 2003
Sharon receives a peace offering from one of her folk-singing neighbors, but the neighbors on the other side begin to drive the family crazy by playing tennis at all hours of the day and night. Jack tries playing drums outside, and Ozzy blasts the loudest, most obnoxious music he can find. However, nothing seems to have an effect on the neighbors. Jack shoots at the court with his paintball gun, leading to a visit from the police. Sharon suspects that the neighbors are responsible when three of the Osbournes' cats disappear, although the coyotes seem the more likely culprit. Kelly brings home another cat, but Ozzy isn't very happy about it.
28	18	"A Little Ditty About Jack and Brieann"	22 July 2003
Jack visits the home of singer/actress Courtney Love. He begins dating Kurt Cobain's half-sister Brieann, who is staying with Courtney. They get along very well, and Jack teaches her some of his favorite recipes, including beans on toast. Sharon is touched to learn that Jack has a tattoo of the word "Mum" with a heart around it. (He got it right after she was diagnosed with cancer.) Ozzy tries out some song lyrics on Sharon, who is too busy talking on the phone to give him her attention at the time. He later plays a demo of the new song for Jack and Brieann. Ozzy is bewildered by a rotisserie turkey as it cooks in the kitchen.
29	19	"Angler Management"	29 July 2003
After 17 years of waiting, Ozzy fulfills his dream of taking Jack on a fishing trip. They get in trouble with the captain for throwing firecrackers at the pelicans. Everyone on board places bets on who can catch the largest fish, and a friend of Jack's wins the contest. Ozzy winds up catching some tin cans and a bird. He also momentarily mistakes a seal for a shark. Nevertheless, they both have a great time on the trip.
30	20	"Bye Bye Babies"	5 August 2003
Jack and Robert fly to England to spend time at the Osbournes' other home. Jack shows Robert the house and introduces him to the family's oldest dog, Sugar. Some of Jack's friends also come over to hang out with them and drink. Lola grows lonely and bored because she misses Jack so much. Sharon also laments the departures of both Jack and Kelly, who is away on tour. Meanwhile, Ozzy uncovers an old keyboard from his Black Sabbath days and tries to get it working again. He also becomes fascinated with carrot cake, but Pete tries to stop him from overdoing it. Jack and Kelly return home and are reunited with their loved ones.
31	21	"Ozz Well That Ends Well"	12 August 2003
Kelly experiences problems in her relationship with Bert. He finally breaks up with her over the phone on Valentine's Day, claiming that no one took him seriously because he was dating her. Kelly becomes extremely irritable and depressed, and takes her anger out on the family. She argues with Sharon, who suggests that she find another manager; and bites Jack on the arm. She overhears her family talking about her and decides to leave home. Meanwhile, Jack is alarmed when he acts out violently in his sleep. He wakes up one night to find himself beating up Lola. On another night, he attacks Minnie; and is horrified to wake up and discover that he has killed her. He flees the house with the body. A devastated Sharon retreats to the family's Malibu home to escape memories of Minnie. Ozzy is left all alone, with no one to help him fix the television. Suddenly, the director yells, "Cut!" Ozzy rejoins his family (including Minnie) in another room, and it is revealed that this episode has been scripted. Everyone pretends that the entire series has been fake: Ozzy expresses relief at no longer having to say the f-word, and tells someone to pick up the "fake" dog doo.
32	22	"The Osbourne Family Christmas Special"	11 December 2003
The Osbournes prepare for Christmas in a series of skits. The dogs are dressed in festive attire; Sharon horrifies Kelly by trying to make her dress "Christmas-y" for the family's upcoming party; Mandy Moore tries in vain to get Jack and Kelly into the holiday spirit; and Ozzy very reluctantly performs a holiday duet with fellow MTV reality star Jessica Simpson. The family hosts a blow-out celebrity bash for the holidays, complete with cooking segments, a visit from Santa, Christmas carols, and a unique version of "'Twas the Night Before Christmas."

=== Season 3 (2004) ===
No. overall	No. in series	Title	Original release date
33	1	"The Show Must Go Oz"	27 January 2004
Sharon faces pressure from the powers that be behind her talk show, who are disappointed in her performance and expect her to work harder. She refuses to incorporate their suggestions into the show. Kelly and Jack grow tired of appearing on Sharon's show; both refuse her request for a co-hosting appearance. Ozzy very reluctantly agrees to appear in the Halloween episode. He believes that he is going to just be a guest, and is furious when he learns (at the last minute) that he is to serve as co-host. Meanwhile, the Osbournes' property undergoes some re-decorating. The workmen struggle to move a gigantic Buddha statue across the yard.
34	2	"Car Jacked"	3 February 2004
Jack turns 18 and receives a car as a birthday present. Kelly doesn't believe that he will pass his driver's test because he is such a poor driver, but Sharon disagrees. Jack practices parallel parking with his assistant, and winds up crashing into another car. Jack passes his test, receiving a perfect score on the driving portion of the exam. Meanwhile, Kelly frets about yet another confrontation with Christina Aguilera, this time during the MTV Europe Awards.
35	3	"Rebel Without an Ozz"	10 February 2004
Ozzy and Sharon fret about all of the time they must spend apart as she works on her talk show. One of Sharon's scheduled guests, rapper/actor DMX, runs late and is in danger of not making it to the show on time. He has a history of being late or skipping out on events, and Sharon finds the whole situation very amusing. Ozzy gives everyone who stops by the house a tour of his new home studio. He enjoys watching porn on the state-of-the-art TV. Ozzy also buys a new motorcycle, but isn't quite sure how to start it. Meanwhile, Jack and his friends find new and disgusting ways to entertain themselves.
36	4	"Return of the Ring"	17 February 2004
Ozzy loses a diamond pinkie ring that is worth over $100,000. He becomes obsessed with trying to find it, and pleads with Sharon not to buy any more jewelry. She doesn't pay attention to his decree, and also buys his and her Bentleys. Ozzy eventually finds the ring, but is upset to learn that Sharon plans to buy Kelly a ring for her birthday. Meanwhile, one of the dogs, Colin, has to be fixed because he continuously humps everything in sight.
37	5	"The Accidental Tourist"	24 February 2004
Kelly and Ozzy plan to travel to England, where they are to perform a duet of "Changes," the title track from Kelly's second album, on Top of the Pops. Ozzy upsets Kelly by saying that he doesn't want to come with her, but Sharon assures her that he will change his mind. Kelly's boyfriend, Rob, joins her on the trip. Everyone seems pleased with their duet, and Ozzy predicts that it could hit number one on the U.K. charts. Before a talk show appearance, Kelly gets into a fight with Rob. They apparently break up, and he returns to the U.S. Ozzy annoys Kelly when he immediately complains of boredom and says that he wants to go back to Los Angeles. They later get along well while riding ATVs on the family's estate. Ozzy suffers an accident while riding one of the ATVs. His bodyguard finds him lying on the ground, unconscious.
38	6	"The English Patient"	6 April 2004
After three weeks in the hospital, Ozzy is released and continues to convalesce at his home in England. He and Sharon miss each other desperately. Ozzy develops a craving for éclairs, and cannot get enough of them. Meanwhile, Jack finally gets a hair cut after two years. Sharon experiences more problems with her talk show. Publicists begin pulling their clients from the show because they do not approve of Sharon's behavior, and Sharon grows tired of the constant tinkering with the show (adding cooking segments and makeovers). She decides to quit the show, and no one really fights her on it. She and Ozzy agree that they will no longer work unless it is a project they can take together. Ozzy is able to fly back home to Los Angeles, and is greeted warmly by the family.
39	7	"Scent of a Woman"	13 April 2004
Kelly annoys everyone, particularly Sharon, with her disgusting lack of personal hygiene as she refuses to shower for a long period of time. She is upset when Sharon accuses her of smoking. Ozzy receives a letter supposedly from the Prime Minister of Canada asking him to come to Canada to receive an award. Ozzy, however, suspects that the whole thing is a hoax.
40	8	"Pain in the Neck"	20 April 2004
Ozzy grows increasingly frustrated about being cooped up around the house. He misses Sharon, who is busy working on her show, and is upset about the weight he has been gaining because he cannot work out. He also hates the bulky neck brace that he is forced to wear. Jack gets another tattoo and reveals it to Ozzy. Ozzy is so bored that he goes out grocery shopping with his assistant, Tony, even though he hates to shop. He later joins Jack at the shooting range. Ozzy is soon able to begin using the treadmill again, and receives the good news that he can take off the neck brace.
41	9	"Ozzy Knows Best"	27 April 2004
Ozzy is upset by Kelly's tendency to wear revealing outfits when she goes out to clubs and parties. She feels that he is being overprotective. Ozzy worries about the behavior of one of the bulldogs, Colin, as he is attacking the other dogs (especially Lola). He tries to give him away to an employee, but Jack strongly objects. Ozzy grows frustrated, as he feels that no one pays attention to anything he says. He and Jack eventually patch things up, and Sharon tries to get through to Kelly.
42	10	"Valentine Daze"	4 May 2004
Kelly continues to spend time with Rob, but doesn't want to be his girlfriend because he wants a committed relationship and she feels that she is too young to settle down. Sharon and Melinda try to convince her to change her mind. Jack heads off to Las Vegas. Ozzy and Sharon worry that he will spend too much time gambling. Kelly tells her parents that she is going to drive to San Diego. They don't want her to go, but eventually offer their approval. It turns out she has lied and is also headed to Vegas. Ozzy becomes annoyed with Sharon for trying to decorate his studio. Ozzy and Sharon spend Valentine's Day together and express the hopes that their kids will meet someone special soon. They reflect on their years together.

=== Season 4 (2005) ===
No. overall	No. in series	Title	Original release date
43	1	"Sleepless in Beverly Hills"	17 January 2005
Ozzy begins suffering from insomnia. He eventually undergoes testing with a sleep disorder expert to determine the cause. Jack gets a tattoo of a cross on his chest, but Ozzy and Sharon do not like it.
44	2	"Have Ozz Will Travel"	24 January 2005
The family tries to decide where to go on vacation. Sharon turns down Fiji because none of the hotels meet her standards, while Ozzy nixes a number of other locations for various reasons. Sharon ultimately decides on Hawaii, although Ozzy is still reluctant to go. Meanwhile, Kelly wins a major role in a television pilot. She must miss out on the family's vacation to go to Vancouver for filming.
45	3	"Hawaii Five Ozz"	31 January 2005
Ozzy, Sharon and Jack head to Hawaii for their vacation. Ozzy continues to be miserable for a while, but cheers up following a private luau. Jack goes diving in a shark cage. His friends invite strippers to the luau, and behave in ways that embarrass him. The traveling party winds up leaving without Jack's friends when they fail to show up on time for their flight.
46	4	"Kelly Interrupted"	7 February 2005
Kelly irritates her mother by getting a lip ring. Ozzy and Jack are convinced that Kelly's erratic behavior and chronic illness are the result of drug use, but Sharon refuses to hear of it. Kelly eventually admits the truth to Sharon and enters rehab. Ozzy and Sharon don't believe she will stay at the facility for long.
47	5	"28 Days Later"	14 February 2005
Kelly struggles to adjust to life in rehab, and frequently calls home requesting various personal belongings. She wants to leave, but Jack urges her to tough it out. Jack celebrates both his birthday and a year of sobriety. Kelly arrives home and becomes frustrated by the curfew and other rules she must follow. She clashes with her mother often, and accuses Sharon of messing with her head when she expresses her concerns.
48	6	"Charity Case"	21 February 2005
Sharon and Kelly plan a trip to Kenya on behalf of a charity organization. Ozzy doesn't want them to go, as he fears they will be kidnapped or contract malaria. Sharon also has second thoughts after hearing more details about the trip. The family receives a visit from Elton John, who gives Ozzy an expensive necklace that leaves him feeling a bit embarrassed; and goes on a shopping spree with Sharon, Jack and Kelly. Ozzy, Sharon and Kelly later attend an event in honor of Covenant House, where Sharon receives an award and Kelly bids on a puppy.
49	7	"Number One Fan"	28 February 2005
A 25-year-old fan wins a charity auction for the right to spend the day with Sharon. Sharon is touched by the woman's generosity and invites her to spend the night at the Osbourne home. Meanwhile, Jack must attend an online traffic school after getting a speeding ticket.
50	8	"Lozt in Translation"	7 March 2005
The family travels to Japan, where Ozzy is to receive the Legend Award at the Video Music Awards. Kelly also makes several personal appearances. One of the employees, Sam, meets with some family members whom he hasn't seen in years, but can only communicate with them through a translator.
51	9	"The Show Must Go Off!"	14 March 2005
Sharon's talk show tapes its final episodes. Feeling mistreated, Sharon clashes with her bosses to the very end, showing up late on purpose and demanding money upfront. She takes her mind off of things by shopping, including the purchase of a state-of-the-art toilet. Kelly feels hurt when Sharon repeatedly criticizes her wardrobe. Ozzy pays another visit to the dentist.
52	10	"A Farewell to Ozz"	21 March 2005
Dr. Phil McGraw pays a visit to the house, where he holds a frank discussion with the Osbournes about drug abuse and other issues that have affected the family's relationships with one another. Examples are given through clips from previous episodes. Unlike the rest of the shows from the fourth season, featuring footage shot in the previous year, this episode was taped just weeks before it aired. Episode also was listed as "Family Therapy" in some listings.
