= Podrobytsi =

Podrobytsi (Ukrainian: Подробиці, lit. 'Details'), often referred to as podrobnosti.ua, is a Ukrainian news portal, one of the leading Internet news projects in the nation. As of early 2007 the site was visited by more than 30,000 viewers daily.

It is affiliated with a leading privately held national TV channel Inter, whose analytic department operates the site as well as the eponymous analytical TV-program that runs on the channel.

== Time and language ==
The program is broadcast daily at 20:00 in Ukrainian language (from October 13, 2018).
