= Zooming (writing skill) =

Zooming is a writing skill, as outlined in secondary education, that gives the reader the feeling of moving through space towards or away from a character or object, especially used in descriptive writing. It can be divided into two types: zooming in and zooming out. The idea of zooming finds and analog in the cinematic technique of the same name widely used in film.

== Zooming in ==
When zooming in, the narrator guides the reader in following a point of view. A conventional use of the technique might first create in the reader's mind a bird's eye view, or aerial shot, of the setting . The narrator might then delimit the reader's scope, before leading the reader to the object of focus. Since the introduction of the object is suspended, there might be a surprise ending.

== Zooming out ==
When zooming out, a single object might be the initial focus. The narrator then widens the view of the reader, and might eventually introduce the overview of the setting or fictional world.
