= MTV (Ukrainian TV channel) =

MTV Ukraine
- Country: Ukraine
- Broadcast area: Ukraine
- Headquarters: Kyiv

Programming
- Language: Ukrainian
- Picture format: 4:3 (576i, SDTV)

Ownership
- Owner: MTV Networks Europe; GDF Media Limited; Emerging Europe Growth Fund

History
- Launched: 24 August 2007; 19 years ago
- Replaced: MTV Europe
- Closed: 1 June 2013; 13 years ago
- Replaced by: Zoom (free-to-air); MTV Europe (pay television)

Links
- Website: mtv.ua

MTV Ukraine (Ukrainian: MTV Україна) was a Ukrainian free-to-air television music channel operated by GDF Media Limited under licence from VIMN Europe. The channel was launched on 24 August 2007, 6:00 a.m., replacing MTV Europe in Ukraine, and was replaced on 31 May 2013 by a new youth-orientated music and general entertainment channel called Zoom.

== Channel rebrand ==
On 31 May 2013 the operators of MTV in Ukraine, 'GDF Media' announced that the channel would cease operating from 23:00 on 31 May 2013 and would be rebranded as Zoom. The decision to replace MTV with a new channel was decided by GDF Media, as the owners of the licence to operate the Ukrainian version of MTV felt the brand is no-longer relevant to the demographic the channel was targeting. The decision to replace MTV Ukraine with Zoom came shortly after MTV Russia was closed down as a free-to-air television network and relaunched on pay television. At the same year, MTV Brasil was also closed down as a free-to-air television network by Grupo Abril and relaunched on pay television by Viacom Latin America.
