= The Day (Kyiv) =

Ukrainian daily newspaper

- Frequency: Daily
- First issue: 1996; 29 years ago
- Country: Ukraine
- Based in: Kyiv
- Language: Ukrainian, Russian, English
- Website: day.kyiv.ua
- ISSN: 2305-7289

Den' (Ukrainian: День, pronounced [dɛnʲ]; lit. The Day) is a Kyiv-based daily broadsheet newspaper.

The newspaper is published in three languages: Ukrainian, Russian and English.

== History and profile ==
Den was founded in 1996.

Larysa Ivshyna is the paper's editor-in-chief. The paper was linked to former prime minister Yevhen Marchuk, her husband.

Notable staff writers include linguist and pro-democracy advocate Anna Danylchuk.

The paper is also notable for its annual photography contest, being the main photo event in Ukraine.

Den is a member of UAPP.

== See also ==
- List of newspapers in Ukraine
