= Zoomer (album) =

Album by Schneider TM

Studio album by Schneider TM
- Released: 20 August 2002
- Genre: Electropop
- Length: 45:44
- Label: City Slang; Mute
- Producer: Dirk Dresselhaus

Schneider TM chronology
Moist (1998)	Zoomer (2002)	Škoda Mluvit (2006)

Singles from Zoomer
- 1. "Frogtoise" Released: 29 July 2002; 2. "Reality Check" Released: 27 January 2003

Professional ratings
Aggregate scores
Source	Rating
Metacritic	71/100
Review scores
Source	Rating
AllMusic	4/5 stars
Drowned in Sound	9/10
Muzik	4/5 stars
Now	4/5
Pitchfork	8.5/10
Q	2/5 stars
Stylus Magazine	5.3/10
Uncut	4/5 stars

Zoomer is the second studio album by German electronic music artist Schneider TM. It was released on 20 August 2002 in the United States by Mute Records and on 2 September 2002 by City Slang.

== Track listing ==
All lyrics are written by Dirk Dresselhaus, except where noted; all music is composed by Dresselhaus.

1. "Reality Check" – 4:23
2. "Frogtoise" – 6:59
3. "Abyss" – 6:28
4. "DJ Guy?" – 6:47
5. "Turn On" (lyrics by Max Turner) – 5:49
6. "Hunger" – 5:07
7. "999" – 5:16
8. "Cuba TM" – 4:55

== Personnel ==
Credits are adapted from the album's liner notes.

- Dirk Dresselhaus – production, mixing (tracks 3, 6, 7), booklet illustrations
- Cathi Aglibut – viola on "Cuba TM"
- Vredeber Albrecht – electric piano on "Cuba TM"
- D. D. Allin – cover design
- Matthias Arfmann – mixing (tracks 1, 2, 4, 5, 8)
- Elger Emig – cover design
- Bo Kondren – mastering
- Paul Niehaus – slide guitar on "Cuba TM"
- Max Turner – vocals on "Turn On"
- Christopher Uhe – bass on "999"
- Tina Winkhaus – photography
