= Zoom (dance music group) =

Danish Eurodance group

- Origin: Denmark
- Genres: Eurodance
- Years active: 1998–1999
- Labels: BMG Records
- Past members: Ali Movasat; Anja; Brandon Kirkham

Zoom were a Eurodance group formed in Denmark. Their top hit was "Words", a cover version of the 1982 song by F.R. David. It reached number 7 in Denmark.

== Discography ==
=== Studio albums ===
Title	Details	Peak chart positions
Title	Details	DEN
Zoom	Release date: 1999; Label: BMG Records; Formats: CD	29
"—" denotes releases that did not chart

=== Singles ===
Year	Single	Peak chart positions	Album
Year	Single	DEN	Album
1998	"Take Everything"	—	Zoom
1999	"Words"	7	Zoom
1999	"I Can't Help Myself"	—	Zoom
1999	"Hold Tight"	—	Zoom
"—" denotes releases that did not chart
