= Inter (TV channel) =

Ukrainian television channel

Inter Інтер
- Country: Ukraine
- Broadcast area: Ukraine; Europe (As Inter+); United States (As Inter+)
- Headquarters: Kyiv

Programming
- Picture format: 16:9 (576i, SDTV)

Ownership
- Owner: GDF Media Limited
- Sister channels: Domestic : NTN; K1; K2; Zoom; Mega; Pixel TV; Enter-Film; International : Inter+

History
- Founded: 1996; 30 years ago
- Launched: 20 October 1996; 30 years ago
- Replaced: ORT (Channel One Russia)
- Closed: Inter+: January 1, 2021 (Russia); December 1, 2021 (Ukraine on HD); December 3, 2021 (Denmark); January 23, 2022 (Romania, Sweden, Turkey); January 31, 2022 (on Dish Network); February 2, 2022 (Colombia, Uruguay); February 20, 2022 (Peru); February 28, 2022 (Mexico); March 1, 2022 (Macedonia, Poland, Latin America)
- Replaced by: Inter in the context of the 2014 annexation of Crimea: Channel One Russia (in Sevastopol); NTV (in Simferopol)

Links
- Website: Official website

Availability

Terrestrial
- Zeonbud: MX-1 (7)

Streaming media
- Inter Live: Watch live

Inter (Ukrainian: Інтер) is a Ukrainian television channel. It covers 99.7 percent of Ukraine's territory. (Note: According to the channel's own information) According to the Kyiv Post, it is among the most-watched television channels in Ukraine.

Since February 26, 2022, Inter became part of a state-coordinated United News telethon that broadcasts around the clock to provide information to the public regarding the Russo-Ukrainian War. Since then, the broadcasting grid, program, and editorial policies have been radically changed. Inter also agreed to decode the satellite signals so that people from all over the world could see what is really happening in Ukraine.

Inter is part of Inter Media Group, owned in turn by oligarch Dmytro Firtash. At the beginning of 2024—2025, Inter Media Group reported an increase in the performance of its channels. On July 10, 2025, due to staff reductions and financial problems related to the news program and the media group, it was announced from August 1, 2025, the correspondent and journalistic bureaus in the United Kingdom, Germany, and Belgium (except in the USA) would be closed, with some employees laid off.

== History ==
The channel was founded by the Ukrainian Independent TV-Corporation in 1996. It broadcast on the former UT-3 network. At the time of the channel's founding, the 29% of the Ukrainian Independent Television Corporation was held by ORT, who also supplied Inter with programming. In 2015 this part of the shares was bought out, because the Ukrainian parliament raised the need to completely eliminate Russia's information influence.

Besides its international version of the channel as the business project, Inter now consists of several similar projects. Those are 07 Production – a studio of the documentary films, NIS – an information studio featuring Podrobytsi, Pirat Production – a studio of entertainment shows. There were also over five other independent channels such as NTN, K1, K2, Megasport, Enter-Film, and Enter-Music (a Ukrainian version of MTV).

In February 2022, the Russian invasion of Ukraine brought Inter to the brink of survival, with operations at the channels almost paralysed – only thirty of the two hundred people who used to make news on Inter were at work. The channel then subsequently joined the United News telethon, which has been funded by the state since 2022 and was widely seen as an element of defense against Russia's attempt to subjugate Ukraine. During the meeting with the Ukrainian journalists (including the representatives of Inter) President of Ukraine Volodymyr Zelenskyy called the United News one of the key stages in the history of invincibility of Ukraine.

== Inter Plus ==

Inter Plus (Ukrainian: Інтер+) is the international network of Inter Channel that broadcasts the "best of Inter" programming to Ukrainians abroad in North America & Europe. The channel first started broadcasting on January 13, 2003, available via Dish Network in the United States and in Germany through Kabel Deutschland and encrypted in Europe & Russia on Sirius 2 & ABS 1 satellites. As of March 30, 2011, Inter Plus is no longer available on Dish Network.

Inter+ is also available in Canada via IMB+ Records, an IPTV provider.

== Ownership ==
The channel was founded by the Ukrainian Independent TV-Corporation in 1996. The Ukrainian independent TV-corporation's shareholders were Dilovyi Svit 51%, Russian Channel One 29%, Pegas Television 20%. About 82.5% of Pegas Television was the personal property of Ihor Pluzhnikov. The other shares of the company were split between Pegas and Overseas sales Ltd. 17.3% and Bersted Ukraina 0.2%. Those two companies were his property as well. Besides Pegas, he had some shares in Dilovyi Svit which consisted of Bersted Ukraina, RIF-Service, Play Enterprise, insurance company Sindek, and legal services of Konnov and Sozanovskyi. In 2005, Ihor Pluzhnikov unexpectedly died. His death caused a lot of discussions on the political level. In August all of the shares Dilovyi Svit and half of Pegas Television (total of 61%) became a property of what later became known as Ukrainian Mediaproject headed by Valeriy Khoroshkovsky. Pegas was taken over by Pluzhnikov's wife, Svitlana, who has 10% ownership of the Ukrainian independent TV-corporation. There is speculation that she does not have any influence on the business of the telechannel, Inter. As of December 2012, 61% of the shares are owned by Ukrainian Mediaproject, 29% by Channel One and 10% by Pluzhnikov's widow. According to Yaroslav Porokhniak, head of the management board of Inter, the Russian shareholders have no say in the channel's editorial or programming policies.

In September Valeriy became the head of the Observing Council and in 2006 made some changes in the management. In 2007, on the base of Ukrainian Mediaproject was established U.A. Inter Media Group financial holdings.

General producers

- Oleksandr Zinchenko (October 20, 1996 – May 27, 2002)
- Vladyslav Riashyn (October 20, 1996 – January 15, 2006)
- Leonid Mazor (March 24-December 31, 2006)
- Hanna Bezliudna (January 1, 2007 – September 6, 2009)

Information service managers

- Hanna Bezliudna (1997–2001)
- Oleksiy Mustafin (2001–2005)
- Maksym Karyzhskyi (2006)
- Anton Nikitin (2006–2009)
- Oleksandr Pylypets (2009)

The channel is part of GDF Media Limited; since Dmytro Firtash bought 100 percent of Inter Media Group Limited (back) from Valeriy Khoroshkovskyi on February 1, 2013. In June 2007 Khoroshkovskyi had expanded his U.A. Inter Media Group Ltd with various other channels bought from Firtash.

GDF Media Limited also owns NTN, K1, Mega, Enter-Film, K2, Pixel and Zoom.

== Controversies ==
According to critics, the channel used to be directly controlled by the Social Democratic Party of Ukraine (united) until the 2004 Orange Revolution.

In January 2009 the former Ukrainian Prime Minister Yulia Tymoshenko refused to appear on Inter television programs criticizing the channel's associates of their professional ethics.

On February 21, 2014, 16 journalists of the channel claimed to have been the victim of censorship (in the form of having been forced to make "pro-government propaganda") and called on the higher management to objectively cover events concerning Euromaidan. On February 22, 2014, the channel's normal programming was replaced, amid rumours of a possible attack or arson on its headquarters, by the live broadcast of parliamentary sessions. On February 22, 2014, as a part of the "Maidan revolution", President Viktor Yanukovych (the one that the 16 journalists had complained about being forced to create propaganda for) was removed from office.

Early September 2016 the Inter studios were attacked and then blockaded for three days by St Mary's battalion who accused it of being too pro-Russian amidst the Russo-Ukrainian War.

=== Criticism ===
In 2014, Inter's informational policy repeatedly caused a negative reaction from the society. There even was a Facebook group created called Blacklist Inter (Ukrainian: «Інтер в ігнор»). Also, Euromaidan activists called for boycott of the TV channel and asked its employees not to lie in air. Censorship on "Inter" was reported earlier.

=== Russian and Russian-language broadcasting content ===
Since 2014, Inter was criticized for the broadcasting of Russian serials. According to results of monitoring made by "Boycott Russian cinema" activists, in September Inter took 3rd place among top 10 nationwide TV-channels which demonstrate Russian films and serials. During the period from September 8 to 14 Russian content lasted in average 11 hours and 15 minutes per day. According to the data, on September 27 Russian content took about 67% on this channel.

On December 11, 2014 "Boycott Russian Films" activists were picketing Inter's main office in Kyiv. During the action named "Do not kill our protectors by Russian propaganda!" young people placed photos of Ukrainian soldiers, killed during the 2014 Russian military intervention in Ukraine, on the main entrance. Activists claimed that Inter takes second place among TV channels concerning the amount of Russian origin content. Protesters announced that Russian films and serials on Inter glorify Russian armed forces, which is unacceptable during the war.

According to monitoring results held from December 1 to 7 the amount of Russian origin content increased up to 13 hours and 15 minutes per day.

=== Scandal on New Year's night TV shows ===
From December 31, 2014, to January 1, 2015, during celebration of the New Year the channel broadcast a New Year show titled "Wait for me in the New Year" (Russian: «Жди меня в Новый год») with Russian stars who had supported the occupation of Crimea by Russia (Joseph Kobzon, Oleg Gazmanov, Valeriya, etc.). This event immediately caused a burst of resentment in Ukrainian blogosphere and social network. On January 1, a number of Ukrainian high-ranked officials, politicians and cultural workers reacted to the show. Particularly, the secretary of the National Security and Defense Council of Ukraine Oleksandr Turchynov announced that National Council of Television and Radio of Ukraine must consider about cancellation of channel's licence immediately. In the evening the news program of the channel "Podrobnosti" publicly dissociated from New Year shows with Russian stars participating, and announced that the timetable of TV programs was changed incorrectly.

Member of expert commission on distributing and showing films Serhiy Osnach claimed that Inter violated regulation about compulsorily having 50% of Ukrainian content (article 9 of Constitution of Ukraine "About television and radiobroadcasting"). From December 5 to 11, 2015 activists of "Boycott Russian Films" campaign conducted monitoring, results of which confirmed what experts had said. Activists calculated that there is 17% Ukrainian content on Inter.

On January 15, 2015, the National Council for Radio and Television of Ukraine gave a warning to Inter for program broadcasting.

In January 2015, the telecommunications company Kyivstar cancelled booking its advertising slots on Inter: "We stopped placing advertisement movies on Inter. It is important for us that our advertisement correspond with patriotic values, which Kyivstar puts in advertisement as a national Ukrainian operator."

== See also ==
- List of Ukrainian language television channels
- Channel One (Russia)
