= Zoom (Israeli TV channel) =

ZOOM
- Country: Israel
- Broadcast area: Nationwide

Programming
- Language: Hebrew

Ownership
- Owner: Imagine Media

History
- Launched: December 2, 2012 (HOT); June 3, 2013 (Yes)

Links
- Website: ZOOM TV

ZOOM (זום) is an Israeli kids cable television channel. It launched on December 2, 2012 (HOT) and launched on June 3, 2013 (Yes). It is owned by Imagine Media.
