= Zoom (Ukrainian TV channel) =

Zoom Ukrainian: Zoom
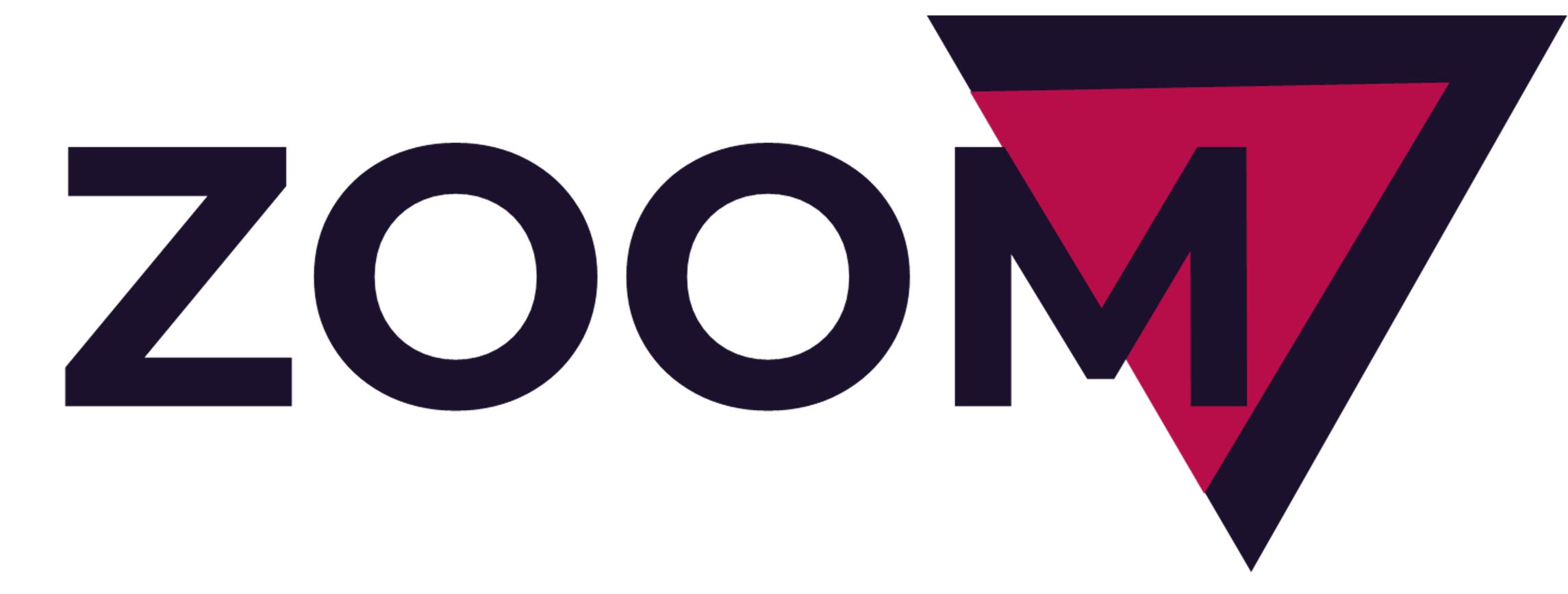
- Country: Ukraine
- Broadcast area: Ukraine
- Headquarters: Kyiv

Programming
- Language: Ukrainian
- Picture format: 16:9 (576i SDTV)

Ownership
- Owner: GDF Media Limited

History
- Launched: 1 June 2013
- Replaced: MTV Ukraine

Links
- Website: zoomua.tv

Availability

Terrestrial
- Zeonbud: MX-3 (24)

Zoom (Ukrainian: Zoom) is a Ukrainian youth entertainment television channel. The channel began broadcasting June 1, 2013, at the former frequency channel of MTV Ukraine.

Content is broadcast in Ukrainian. The channel can be received in the territory of Ukraine on digital terrestrial television DVB-T2 (nationwide multiplex MX-2), and also via cable television, where Zoom, under the relevant contracts and licenses, replaced MTV Ukraine. Abroad, the channel reception is available by the AMOS-3 satellite.

The channel is part of GDF Media Limited, owned by Dmytro Firtash.

Because of the Russian invasion of Ukraine, from February 24, 2022 to December 31, 2024, the TV channel broadcast the informational marathon "United News". Until June 14, 2024, there was no advertising on the air.

On March 1, 2024, the TV channel stopped satellite broadcasting. On March 28, the National Council of Ukraine on Television and Radio Broadcasting changed the broadcasting technology to OTT/IPTV.

On January 1, 2025, the channel was relaunched, changing its format from entertainment to educational and informational, and at the same time resuming independent broadcasting. Russian-language programs are now broadcast in Ukrainian dubbing.
