= Ozzy Osbourne filmography =

List of performances

During his lifetime, Ozzy Osbourne appeared in several reality television shows and documentary films, alongside a number of cameo appearances.

== Television ==
Television appearances
Year	Title	Role	Notes
1986	WrestleMania 2	Himself	PPV
1998	South Park	Himself	Episode: "Chef Aid"
2002	Saturday Night Live	Himself (musical guest)	Episode: "Brittany Murphy/Ozzy Osbourne"
2002	The Bernie Mac Show	Himself	Episode: "Stand-Up Guy"
2002–2005	The Osbournes	Himself	Main cast (52 episodes); MTV reality series
2003	Punk'd	Himself	Episode: "Ashton Kutcher, Kelly Osbourne, Ozzy Osbourne"
2005	Live & Kicking	Himself	Guest appearance
2006	Brad Meltzer's Decoded	Himself	Episode: "The Conspiracy"
2009	WWE Raw	Himself	Guest co-host
2011	Fish Hooks	The Earth Troll (voice)	Episode: "Legend of the Earth Troll"
2013	Haunted Highway	Himself	Guest appearance; uncredited (Season 2)
2013	Behind the Music: Remastered	Himself	Episode: "Motörhead"
2013	CSI: Crime Scene Investigation	Himself	Episode: "Skin in the Game"
2014	The Osbournes: Reloaded	Himself	Pilot
2015	Bubble Guppies	Sid Fishy (voice)	Episode: "Super Guppies!"
2016	The 7D	Duke the Drear (voice)	Episode: "Bummer Vacation/They Growl by Night"
2016–2018	Ozzy & Jack's World Detour	Himself	Co-host (3 seasons); also executive producer
2019–2020	Portals to Hell	Himself	Guest appearance (various episodes)
2020–2021	The Osbournes Want to Believe	Himself	Co-host; also executive producer
2020	The Conners	Himself	Episode: "Beards, Thrupples and Robots"
2021	Home Sweet Home	Himself	Guest
2022	The Kelly Clarkson Show	Himself	Guest
2023	The Osbournes: Home for the Holidays	Himself	TV special
2024	Jack Osbourne's Haunted Holiday	Himself	Host; TV special
2025	Lego Masters Jr.	Himself - Posthumously	Announcing that there was only 1 hour left in the Finale build. Show hosted by Kelly Osbourne
2025	Ozzy Osbourne: Coming Home	Himself - Posthumously	Dedicated to his memory
2025	Ozzy: No Escape from Now	Himself - Posthumously	Dedicated to his memory

== Film ==
Film appearances
Year	Title	Role	Notes
1986	Trick or Treat	Rev. Aaron Gilstrom	
1988	The Decline of Western Civilization Part II: The Metal Years	Himself	Documentary
1995	The Jerky Boys: The Movie	Band Manager	
1997	Private Parts	Himself	Cameo
2000	Little Nicky	Himself	Cameo
2001	Moulin Rouge!	The Green Fairy	Voice
2002	Austin Powers in Goldmember	Himself	Cameo; uncredited
2011	God Bless Ozzy Osbourne	Himself	Documentary; also executive producer
2011	Gnomeo & Juliet	Fawn	Voice
2016	Ghostbusters	Himself	Cameo
2018	Sherlock Gnomes	Fawn	Voice
2020	Trolls World Tour	King Thrash	Voice
2021	The Nine Lives of Ozzy Osbourne	Himself	Documentary; executive producer
2021	We Need to Do Something	Good Boy	Voice
2026	Back to the Beginning: Ozzy's Final Bow	Himself - Posthumously	Documentary/Concert film; final film role

== Music videos ==
Music video appearances
Year	Title	Artist	Role / Notes
1981	"Flying High Again"	Ozzy Osbourne	Himself
1982	"Over the Mountain"	Ozzy Osbourne	Himself
1982	"You Can't Kill Rock and Roll"	Ozzy Osbourne	Himself
1983	"Bark at the Moon"	Ozzy Osbourne	Himself / Werewolf
1986	"Shot in the Dark"	Ozzy Osbourne	Himself
1988	"Miracle Man"	Ozzy Osbourne	Himself
1989	"Breaking All the Rules"	Ozzy Osbourne	Himself
1991	"No More Tears"	Ozzy Osbourne	Himself
1992	"Mama, I'm Coming Home"	Ozzy Osbourne	Himself
1993	"Changes"	Black Sabbath	Himself
1995	"I Just Want You"	Ozzy Osbourne	Himself
1995	"Perry Mason"	Ozzy Osbourne	Himself
2001	"Gets Me Through"	Ozzy Osbourne	Himself
2001	"Dreamer"	Ozzy Osbourne	Himself
2002	"Dream On"	Aerosmith	Himself
2002	"God Bless America"	Ozzy Osbourne	Himself
2007	"I Don't Wanna Stop"	Ozzy Osbourne	Himself
2007	"Crazy Train" (Guitar Hero III version)	Ozzy Osbourne	Himself (animated)
2010	"Let Me Hear You Scream"	Ozzy Osbourne	Himself
2010	"Life Won't Wait"	Ozzy Osbourne	Himself
2010	"Changes" (re-release)	Ozzy Osbourne & Kelly Osbourne	Himself
2019	"Under the Graveyard"	Ozzy Osbourne	Himself
2020	"Ordinary Man"	Ozzy Osbourne feat. Elton John	Himself
2020	"Straight to Hell"	Ozzy Osbourne	Himself
2020	"It's a Raid"	Ozzy Osbourne feat. Post Malone	Himself
2021	"Hellraiser" (30th Anniversary Edition)	Ozzy Osbourne feat. Lemmy	Himself (animated)
2022	"The Funeral"	Yungblud	Himself (cameo)
