= List of Postman Pat characters =

Postman Pat and his cat, Jess, in the original series

The following is a list of characters in the British animated TV series Postman Pat. The main character, Postman Pat, was created by author John Cunliffe.

== Main ==
=== Pat Clifton ===
Patrick "Pat" Clifton (voiced by Ken Barrie from series 1–5, Lewis MacLeod from series 6–8, Stephen Mangan (speaking) and Ronan Keating (singing) in Postman Pat: The Movie, and Bradley Clarkson in various stage productions) is the main character and primary protagonist who is a postman, the husband of Sara and father of Julian. He always manages to land himself in difficult and amusing situations and is friends with nearly everyone in Greendale and the surrounding countryside.

=== Jess ===
Jess (voiced by Melissa Sinden from series 3–8, Mike Disa in Postman Pat: The Movie, and Charlie George in Guess with Jess) is Pat's pet black-and-white cat. He is very clever and always seems to be able to help people when they are in need.

== Adults ==
=== Sara Clifton ===
Sara Clifton (voiced by Carole Boyd in the TV series and Susan Duerden in Postman Pat: The Movie) is the wife of Pat and the mother of Julian. In the early episodes, Sara was a stay-at-home mother, but from series 3 onwards, she has a part-time job in the station café with her new friend, Nisha.

=== Mrs. Goggins ===
Mrs. Goggins (voiced by Ken Barrie in series 1, Carole Boyd in series 2 onwards, and Jane Carr in Postman Pat: The Movie is the village postmistress in Greendale who moved from Scotland and has a small West Highland Terrier named Bonnie.

=== Ted Glen ===
Ted Glen (voiced by Ken Barrie from seasons 1-6, Bradley Clarkson from series 7-8, and Dan Hildebrand in Postman Pat: The Movie) is the local handyman and Pat's best friend who sings "The Handyman Song", in which he has the line, "leave it with me, hehe, leave it with me, I'll try to fix that up for you as easy as can be". He is also something of an inventor and enjoys inventing strange contraptions, mostly occupying himself with general pottering about in his workshop or fixing his ageing Land Rover.

=== Alf Thompson ===
Alf Thompson (voiced by Ken Barrie from series 1-6 and Lewis MacLeod from series 7 onwards, and Darren Richardson in Postman Pat: The Movie) is a farmer who works with his wife, Dorothy, on his farm to make sure his sheep do not get into trouble.

=== Dorothy Thompson ===
Dorothy Thompson (voiced by Ken Barrie in series 1, Carole Boyd in series 2 onwards, and Olivia Poulet in Postman Pat: The Movie) is Alf's blonde wife and Bill's mother who runs Thompson Ground with him.

=== Reverend Timms ===
Reverend Peter Timms (voiced by Ken Barrie from series 1-6, Dan Milne from series 7-8, and Enn Reitel in Postman Pat: The Movie) is the white-haired local Church of England parish vicar.

=== P.C. Selby ===
P.C. Arthur Selby (voiced by Ken Barrie from series 2-6, Bradley Clarkson from series 7 onwards, and Enn Reitel in Postman Pat: The Movie) is a black-haired London-accented policeman and the father of Lucy Selby who patrols in Greendale and Pencaster. He is highly incompetent, but still takes his business very seriously.

=== Doctor Gilbertson ===
Dr. Sylvia Gilbertson (voiced by Ken Barrie in series 1, Carole Boyd from series 2 onwards, and Anastasia Griffith n Postman Pat: The Movie) is Greendale's blonde Welsh doctor and the mother of Sarah Gilbertson, whom P.C. Selby has a crush on.

=== Jeff Pringle ===
Jeff Pringle (voiced by Ken Barrie) is a school teacher and the father of Charlie.

=== Julia Pottage ===
Julia Pottage (voiced by Ken Barrie in series 1 and Carole Boyd in series 2 onwards) is a black-haired orchard farmer and the mother of Katy and Tom.

=== Miss Hubbard ===
Miss Rebecca Hubbard (voiced by Ken Barrie in series 1, Carole Boyd in series 2, and Jean Giplin in Postman Pat: The Movie) is a friend of Pat who also lives in a cottage in the countryside. She has her own bike and is the town's verger.

=== George Lancaster ===
George Lancaster (voiced by Ken Barrie in the TV series and Jacob Witkin in Postman Pat: The Movie) is a farmer at Intake Farm.

=== Major Forbes ===
Major Forbes (voiced by Ken Barrie in the TV series and Jacob Witkin in Postman Pat: The Movie) is a retired army major who lives at Garner Hall.

=== Granny Dryden ===
Granny Dryden (voiced by Ken Barrie) is a friendly old lady who lives in a cottage in the Greendale countryside. She is mildly infirm, hence her asking Pat to help her with assorted household jobs. She is also hard of hearing, be getting the need for Pat to talk loudly to her. She has many old belongings, many of which she has given to Pat and many others.

=== Sam Waldron ===
Sam Waldron (voiced by Ken Barrie) is the owner of a mobile shop and a good old friend of Pat; they once assisted each other by delivering together. Pat often picks up the odd pack of biscuits or cough medicine from the shop.

=== Peter Fogg ===
Peter Fogg (voiced by Ken Barrie) is a farmer who works at Greendale Farm with the Pottages and lives with his wife, Jenny. He plays the guitar and rides a motorcycle.

=== Ajay Bains ===
Ajay Bains (voiced by Kulvinder Ghir in the TV series and Brian George and TJ Ramini in Postman Pat: The Movie) is a train driver from India who is in charge of the Pencaster Flyer as well as his beloved steam train, The Greendale Rocket.

=== Nisha Bains ===
Nisha Bains (voiced by Archie Panjabi in the TV series and Parminder Nagra in Postman Pat: The Movie) is Ajay's wife and Sara's friend who combines running the Station Café with looking after her two children, Meera and Nikhil.

=== Amy Wrigglesworth ===
Amy Wrigglesworth (voiced by Angelina Griffin in the TV series and Aimee Osbourne in Postman Pat: The Movie) is a Veterinary physician who has come to work from Skegness.

=== Ben Taylor ===
Ben Taylor (voiced by Lewis MacLeod in the TV series and TJ Ramini in Postman Pat: The Movie) is the General Manager of the Pencaster Sorting Office who works with Pat for the Special Delivery Service.

=== Lauren Taylor ===
Lauren Taylor (voiced by Janet James in the TV series and Anastasia Griffith in Postman Pat: The Movie) is a new schoolteacher who is the wife of Ben and the mother of Lizzy.

=== Michael Lam ===
Michael Lam (voiced by Kulvinder Ghir in the TV series and Kieron Elliot in Postman Pat: The Movie) is a Chinese man who runs the mobile phone shop and library.

=== Chris Beacon ===
Chris Beacon (voiced by Joel Trill) is a lighthouse keeper.

== Children ==
=== Julian Clifton ===
Julian Clifton (voiced by Carole Boyd in series 2, Janet James from series 3 onward, and Sandra Teles in Postman Pat: The Movie) is a school-boy and the son of Pat and Sara.

=== Bill Thompson ===
Bill Thompson (voiced by Ken Barrie in series 1, Carole Boyd in series 2, Kulvinder Ghir from series 3 onwards, and Steven Kynman in Postman Pat: The Movie) is a black-haired school-boy and the son of Alf and Dorothy.

=== Charlie Pringle ===
Charlie Pringle (voiced by Ken Barrie in series 1, Carole Boyd from series 2 onwards, and Charlie Woodward in Postman Pat: The Movie) a smart young boy who loves science.

=== Sarah Gilbertson ===
Sarah Gilbertson (voiced by Ken Barrie in series 1 and Carole Boyd from series 2 onwards) is a brunette school-girl who is the daughter of Dr. Sylvia Gilbertson. She can be very bossy and full of herself, sometimes with disastrous results, but is good friends with all the local children.

=== Lucy Selby ===
Lucy Selby (voiced by Ken Barrie in series 1, Carole Boyd in series 2, Janet James from series 3 onwards, and Teresa Gallagher in Postman Pat: The Movie) is a brunette schoolchild and the seven-year-old soft-voiced daughter of P.C. Selby.

=== Katy and Tom Pottage ===
Katy and Tom Pottage (voiced by Ken Barrie in series 1, Carole Boyd in series 2, and Archie Panjabi and Kulvinder Ghir (respectively) from series 3-5) are blond-haired twins and Julia Pottage's daughter and son.

=== Meera Bains ===
Meera Bains (voiced by Archie Panjabi in the TV series and Jo Wyatt in Postman Pat: The Movie) is the daughter of Ajay and Nisha and Nikhil's big sister. She is also Julian's pen pal.

=== Nikhil Bains ===
Nikhil Bains is the baby son of Ajay and Nisha and the brother of Meera who adores his plush green rabbit.

=== Lizzy Taylor ===
Lizzy Taylor (voiced by Angela Griffin in the TV series and Becky Wright in Postman Pat: The Movie) is a school-girl and the daughter of Ben and Lauren, who uses a wheelchair.

== Animals ==
=== Bonnie ===
Bonnie (voiced by Mellisa Sinden) is Mrs. Goggins' West Highland White Terrier.

=== Pumpkin ===
Pumpkin is Amy Wrigglsworth's Welsh Mountain Pony.
