= Sharon Osbourne Management =

Talent management company

Sharon Osbourne Management is a talent management company set up by Sharon Osbourne that manages acts in the entertainment industry. It has represented The Smashing Pumpkins, Coal Chamber, Queen, Gary Moore, Motörhead, Lita Ford, and ELO., as well as Osbourne's late husband Ozzy Osbourne and children Kelly Osbourne and Jack Osbourne.
