= Postman Pat: The Movie =

2014 film by Mike Disa

- British theatrical release poster
- Directed by: Mike Disa
- Written by: Nicole Dubuc
- Story by: Annika Bluhm; Kim Fuller
- Based on: Postman Pat by John Cunliffe and Ivor Wood
- Produced by: Robert Anich
- Starring: Stephen Mangan; Jim Broadbent; Rupert Grint; David Tennant; Ronan Keating
- Edited by: Robert David Sanders
- Music by: Rupert Gregson-Williams
- Production companies: Classic Media; RGH Pictures; Timeless Films
- Distributed by: Icon Film Distribution; Lionsgate (United Kingdom); Shout! Factory (United States)
- Release date: 23 May 2014 (United Kingdom)
- Running time: 88 minutes
- Countries: United Kingdom; United States
- Language: English
- Box office: $8.6 million

Postman Pat: The Movie is a 2014 animated comedy film based on the British television series Postman Pat by John Cunliffe and Ivor Wood. It was directed by Mike Disa, produced by Robert Anich Cole, written by Nicole Dubuc, with music by Rupert Gregson-Williams. It was co-produced by Classic Media, RGH Pictures and Timeless Films.

The film stars Stephen Mangan, Jim Broadbent, Rupert Grint, David Tennant, Ronan Keating, Susan Duerden, Sandra Teles, TJ Ramini and Peter Woodward. It was released in the UK on 23 May 2014 by Lionsgate UK and Icon Film Distribution respectively and in the US by Shout! Factory, and received mixed reviews from critics. The film grossed $8.6 million worldwide.

== Plot ==
Patrick "Pat" Clifton, also known as "Postman Pat", is a friendly postman who delivers letters in the English village of Greendale with his cat Jess. One day, Pat plans to take his wife, Sara, on a late honeymoon to Italy, and intends to afford it through a bonus from his employer, the Special Delivery Service. However, their new boss, Edwin Carbunkle, has cancelled all bonuses, and plans to make SDS more efficient and profitable by replacing its human workers with machinery.

When Pat gets home and tries to tell Sara the news, his son Julian shows him a television talent show, You're the One. Its host, Simon Cowbell, states the next auditions will take place in Greendale and that the winner of the finals will be awarded with a holiday to Italy and a recording contract. Pat takes part in the contest in hopes of winning the holiday tickets and his unexpected singing voice wins the contest. Pat is to sing again in the finale in a head-to-head contest with another winner named Josh. Josh's manager, Wilf, is jealous of Pat and is keen to make sure that Josh wins at all costs.

Having seen Pat's performance with Mr. Brown, the chief executive officer of the SDS, Carbunkle invents robot look-alikes of Pat and Jess, named the "Patbot 3000" and "Jessbot" respectively, to take over Pat's job during his absence. They cause chaos and anger the villagers as they do so, and everyone except Pat and Carbunkle is oblivious to Pat's replacement. Ben Taylor, the manager of SDS, and his co-workers are later fired by Carbunkle and replaced by Patbot. Shortly after, Carbunkle unleashes an array of multiple Patbots and Pat grows guilty about entering the contest as he becomes distant from his family and disliked by his friends.

Shortly after Pat's departure for the final competition, Ben and Jess witness the multiple Patbots before watching as Wilf causes a Patbot to malfunction by using a magnet. Ben later explains the situation to the whole town of Greendale, and they all agree to attend the London finals to support Pat. Meanwhile, just as Pat regrets his decisions, Carbunkle reveals his intentions to Pat and has him replaced with a Patbot, who locks Pat inside a dressing room. However, Jess frees Pat and they try to break into the show, only to be pursued by multiple Patbots. As Pat and Jess reach the roof, they are ambushed by Jessbot who attempts to shoot Pat with a laser, but a ricochet off of Pat’s hat causes it to set itself on fire.

Patbot performs in Pat's place before being exposed by Wilf. The real Pat interrupts the performance and attempts to explain, ultimately giving a speech on the importance of the "human touch". As Carbunkle commands his army of Patbots to kill Pat, Simon, and Brown, Carbunkle's remote is knocked out of his hands and used by Josh to demobilise the robots. Brown fires Carbunkle before the latter is taken away, and Wilf gives up his jealousy. As Pat expresses his reason for entering the contest, he regains his confidence upon seeing Sara, Julian, and the Greendale residents in the audience. Pat decides to continue his act, in which he sings "Signed, Sealed, Delivered I'm Yours". Pat and Sara win the holiday to Italy and pass the recording contract to Josh and Wilf.

== Voice cast ==
- Stephen Mangan as Pat Clifton and Patbot 3000
- Jim Broadbent as Mr. Brown
- Rupert Grint as Josh
- David Tennant as Wilf
- Ronan Keating as himself (credited as "Ronan") and Pat's singing voice
- Susan Duerden as Sara Clifton
- Sandra Teles as Julian Clifton
- Mike Disa as Jess, UDM 3000, and Jessbot 3000
- TJ Ramini as Ben Taylor and Ajay Bains (rapping voice and additional lines)
- Peter Woodward as Edwin Carbunkle and Judge (uncredited)
- Robin Atkin Downes as Simon Cowbell
- Brian George as Ajay Bains
- Parminder Nagra as Nisha Bains
- Jo Wyatt as Meera Bains
- Enn Reitel as PC Arthur Selby, Reverend Timms, Raed, and Pat Wanna Be #2
- Jane Carr as Mrs Goggins and Granny
- Dan Hildebrand as Ted Glenn
- Darren Richardson as Alf Thompson and SDS Employee #2
- Jacob Witkin as George Lancaster and Major Forbes
- Jean Gilpin as Miss Hubbard, Crowd Lady, and Pat Wanna Be #3
- Anastasia Griffith as Dr. Sylvia Gilbertson and Lauren Taylor
- Laura Solon as Chat Host
- Olivia Poulet as Dorothy Thompson
- Aimee Osbourne as Amy Wrigglesworth
- Becky Wright as Lizzy Taylor
- Steve Kynman as Bill Thompson
- Teresa Gallagher as Lucy Selby
- Charlie Woodward as Charlie Pringle
- Kieron Elliott as Michael Lam and SDS Employee #1
- Chris Evans as Radio Announcer
- Craig Ferguson as himself (credited as "Craig") and Not a Dalek
- Robert Anich as Escapologist
- Adam Smyth as Cameraman #1
- Lucy Davis as Director #1
- Julian Stone as Director #2 and Stagehand #2
- Tony Curran as Paparazzi #2
- Kelly Beckett as Reporter and SDS Employee #3
- Dee Bradley Baker as Pat Wanna Be #1

Additional voices were provided by Alison Dowling, Becky Wright, Charlie Woodward, Jo Wyatt, Jon Glover, Kristopher Milnes (credited as "Kris Milnes"), Rachel Louise Miller, Ross Lee, Steve Kynman, Teresa Gallagher, and Tim Bentinck.

== Production ==
=== Development ===
On 11 October 2004, it was announced that Entertainment Rights was in discussions with several American film studios, including 20th Century Fox, Warner Bros. and Universal Pictures, who had approached the company to acquire the rights to produce film adaptations of their television series, including the television series Postman Pat, created by John Cunliffe and Ivor Wood. On 7 October 2009, Simon Reynolds of Digital Spy reported that a Postman Pat film was in the works. The film was being produced by Classic Media using a combination of stop motion animation and CGI animation, and was initially set for release in 2011. However, Cosgrove Hall Films, the company that produced the new version of the series, was closed down by ITV plc on 26 October 2009. Production dropped the stop-motion element and switched to making the film in full CGI.

On 16 September 2011, RGH Pictures and Timeless Films were announced to have been selected to co-produce the film, then titled Postman Pat: The Movie – You Know You're The One, with Mike Disa as the director. Prior to directing the film, Disa was a fan of the British science fiction series Red Dwarf in the 1980s. To obtain bootlegged copies of British television programmes in the United States, he traded video tapes with other enthusiasts and at fan conventions. While attempting to compile a complete collection of Red Dwarf, he acquired tapes that also included episodes of Postman Pat and Thomas & Friends, becoming familiar with the former series in the process.

The screenplay was written by Nicole Dubuc, based on a story written by series producer Annika Bluhm and Kim Fuller. A workprint of the film reveals that it initially had a different story. The film was produced on a very limited budget in contrast to animated films made by studios, which led to the script being rewritten to focus on the relationship between Pat Clifton and his family, and the film being scaled down to limit the number of sets and characters. Disa stated that he avoided using tropes from American animated feature films, choosing to balance the film's action scenes with the established British aesthetic of the original series. Dubuc added the idea of a robotic version of Jess, named "Jessbot 3000", to the script, feeling that the audience would not believe that the robotic version of Pat, named "Patbot 3000", was actually him. The script initially did not have a central antagonist, so the character of Edwin Carbunkle was created.

=== Casting ===
The voices in the film were set as Stephen Mangan, who was cast as Pat; Jim Broadbent, Rupert Grint, and David Tennant. Gary Barlow was originally going to provide Pat's singing voice, and Kate Winslet was originally cast as Sara Clifton. Ronan Keating, Susan Duerden, Robin Atkin Downes, and Greg Ellis later joined the cast, with Keating cast as Pat's singing voice instead of Barlow and Duerden cast as Sara instead of Winslet. Keating makes a cameo appearance in the film as an auditioner for You're the One being turned down by Simon Cowbell, which was done as a prank at Simon Cowell. Cowell was actually asked to voice Cowbell, but he declined because he was not much of a voice actor.

Disa thought that Peter Woodward had a good villain voice, and created Edwin Carbunkle specifically for him. Because of the film's budget, Disa used table reads and recording sessions in a "radio play" format with the actors rather than having them record their voices separately, allowing them to improvise dialogue and humor that would later be used in the final film. During the table read, Woodward was suffering from allergies, and developed his voice for Carbunkle based on the congestion, using a "slightly adenoidal" tone in favour of a deep, breathy, evil one to make Carbunkle distinct from the other characters. The audience and judges' reactions during Pat's interview were taken from the table read, with Woodward voicing a judge who says, "I wish I had a cat." Woodward's son Charlie was cast as Charlie Pringle. Disa also provided the vocal effects for Jess. Craig Ferguson contacted the filmmakers and asked to be cast in the film, driven by his love for the Daleks from Doctor Who. He voiced a fictionalised version of himself and the robot character "Not a Dalek".

=== Animation ===
Animation production was originally handled by Xing Xing Digital Corporation, but RGH Pictures later decided to move production to Prana Studios. The 3D character models and assets were designed using Autodesk Maya. Disa had to get the original creators of the series and Classic Media to approve and sign off on the plot and character designs.

== Release ==
Postman Pat: The Movie was originally going to be released on 24 May 2013, but it was pushed back to 23 May 2014. In the United Kingdom, it was theatrically released by Lionsgate and Icon Film Distribution jointly. In the United States, it entered a limited theatrical release from Shout! Factory in Los Angeles and New York on 27 June 2014, and was released on DVD by Paramount Home Media Distribution on 23 September.

The film was released in the United Kingdom on DVD and Blu-ray by Lionsgate Home Entertainment on 29 September 2014.

== Reception ==
=== Box office ===
Postman Pat: The Movie grossed £774,450 in its opening weekend, ranking #4 in the box office in the United Kingdom led by X-Men: Days of Future Past with £9,144,971. The film grossed $5,515,679 in the United Kingdom and a total of $8,660,022 globally.

=== Critical response ===
On the review aggregator website Rotten Tomatoes, 43% of 28 critics' reviews are positive, with an average rating of 4.7/10. The website's consensus reads: "A nearly passable attempt at children's entertainment that pales in comparison to less pandering fare, Postman Pat: The Movie doesn't get the job done." Metacritic, which uses a weighted average, assigned the film a score of 44 out of 100, based on nine critics, indicating "mixed or average" reviews.

Patrick Smith, writing for The Daily Telegraph, gave the film two stars, commenting "where the TV series was charming in its simplicity, this seems over-egged". Andrew Pulver of The Guardian gave it two stars, calling it "a misjudgment, a serious overestimation of the development of the four-year-old's irony circuit". In The Observer, Mark Kermode gave it the same rating, criticising "bland digimation" and lack of the "charm" of the television series, and saying that the film had "little to entice the over-sixes and plenty to scare the under-fives". In the Daily Mirror, David Edwards gave the film two stars, writing "Boasting spectacularly shoddy animation and gags that wouldn’t amuse a dim-witted five-year-old, this is one to be thrown out with the junk mail".

Allan Hunter of the Daily Express gave it three stars, and said "Kids are going to love Postman Pat: The Movie even if adults might find it sacrilegious in its treatment of their beloved childhood favourite... It's a bit Wallace & Gromit, a bit Doctor Who and just as silly and overexcited as a four-year-old after an excess of fizzy drinks." The Los Angeles Times' Gary Goldstein wrote "First-class Postman Pat delivers in fine style". The Mareel review written by Caroline Malcolm wrote "Postman Pat: The Movie, was a surprise from start to finish...Mike Disa, who is known for his children's animations showed off his artistic style by yet again creating a movie that captivated children with CGI pleasures, but also enticed adults with intensely intelligent sociobites disguised as entertainment."

=== Accolades ===
Postman Pat: The Movie's production groups, Timeless Films and Zealot Productions, were nominated for Best Foreign Animation/Family Trailer at the Golden Trailer Awards in 2014.

=== Legacy ===
In 2025, the film experienced a resurgence in Internet culture, becoming a viral meme across social media platforms like Twitter. Users humorously re-evaluated its plot elements (such as Pat being replaced by robotic versions of himself) and voice cast, viewing the former as "ironic" as it mirrored their fears of corporations using AI to replace human jobs.
