= Ozzy Osbourne: Coming Home =

2025 British documentary film

- Genre: Documentary film
- Directed by: Paula Wittig
- Starring: Ozzy Osbourne; Sharon Osbourne; Kelly Osbourne; Jack Osbourne
- Country of origin: United Kingdom
- Original language: English

Production
- Executive producers: Rachael Barnes; Colin Barr; Louisa McKay; Ben Wicks
- Editor: Garry Crystal
- Running time: 59 minutes
- Production company: Expectation TV

Original release
- Network: BBC One
- Release: 2 October 2025

Ozzy Osbourne: Coming Home is a documentary film produced by Expectation TV for BBC One. The documentary features footage of the Osbourne family filmed over three years prior to Ozzy Osbourne's death in July 2025.

The film is one hour in length and had originally been conceived as a series titled Home to Roost but was changed to a one-off special when Ozzy's health rapidly declined. The series was intended to show Osbourne family's return to the United Kingdom after many years living in the United States. On the planned day of transmission, 18 August 2025, it was announced by the BBC that it would be postponed but broadcast at a future date. The documentary was rescheduled to be broadcast on 2 October 2025. This documentary is also dedicated in Ozzy's memory.
