= Jack Osbourne: Adrenaline Junkie =

British television series (2005–2009)

- Series 1 & 2 DVD cover
- Starring: Jack Osbourne
- No. of series: 5
- No. of episodes: 29

Production
- Running time: 60 minutes (including adverts)
- Production company: Ginger Productions

Original release
- Network: ITV2
- Release: 1 October 2005 – 20 October 2009

Jack Osbourne: Adrenaline Junkie is a British reality television series on ITV2, series 1 focused on Jack Osbourne's globe-trekking six-month quest to get in physical and mental shape to climb the rockface of California's El Capitan mountain, the show documents Osbourne running with the bulls in Pamplona, Spain, following a strict exercise regimen, Muay Thai training in Thailand, and "an overall 180-degree mental make-over".

The show was broadcast by MuchMusic in Canada, and the Travel Channel in the United States, and Series 1 and 2 were repeated on the ITV Network late at night. The programme is also broadcast on the Extreme Sports Channel in the UK.

== Series 1 ==
The first series of Jack Osbourne: Adrenaline Junkie began on ITV2 on Saturday 1 October 2005. The last episode of the series was broadcast on ITV2 on Saturday 15 October 2005.

Episode 1

Follows Jack through daily five-mile runs, six-hour training sessions, fasting and enemas during an intense stay at a sweltering Muay Thai boxing camp near Bangkok.

Episode 2

Kelly Osbourne visits her brother in Spain to watch him risk his life running with the bulls in Pamplona. Jack also confronts his tear-inducing phobia of heights during a training session in the French Alps.

Episode 3

Tensions mount as Ozzy and Sharon watch their son quiver his way up the jagged rockface of California's El Capitan mountain.

== Series 2 ==
The second series of Jack Osbourne: Adrenaline Junkie began on ITV2 on Saturday 19 August 2006. The last episode of the series was broadcast on ITV2 on Saturday 9 September 2006.

Episode 1

Jack Osbourne heads around the world for the next three months testing his adrenaline-fuelled resolve. He challenges himself with the world's biggest bungee jump and the Marathon des sables, a 150-mile ultra-marathon through the Sahara Desert.

Episode 2

Osbourne takes on a gruelling jungle expedition in Central America with Trekforce.

Episode 3

The adventure continues in New Zealand where Jack tries some white-water kayaking before heading to Japan for a series of gruelling trials.

Episode 4

India challenges Jack, where he tries the ancient and hard-core combat sport of Kushti Wrestling. After that there is one more ordeal he must pass before heading home...

== Series 3 ==
The third series of Jack Osbourne: Adrenaline Junkie began on ITV2 at 9:40pm on Saturday 18 August 2007. The last episode of the series was broadcast on ITV2 at 8:45pm on Saturday 6 October 2007.

Episode 1

Jack Osbourne heads around the world testing his adrenaline-fuelled resolve, but this time he is taking five young recruits with him. This episode kicks off in the mountains of New Zealand, where Jack pushes his fledgling recruits' fear of heights to terrifying new levels.

Episode 2

Jack Osbourne takes five young recruits around the world on a series of adrenaline-fuelled adventures. Jack leads his recruits deep into the heart of the Sarawak jungle to meet the nomadic Penan people. Throughout the five-day trek, the recruits have to face blood sucking leeches, learn how to hunt for wild boar and are driven to the brink of exhaustion.

Episode 3

Jack Osbourne travels the world with a group of young people, testing their nerve in a series of adrenaline-fuelled adventures. Jack takes his recruits on a two-day crash course in the urban sport of free running, before they head off to Finland. Once there, they make plans to undertake a husky expedition to the Arctic Circle. But a mysterious illness begins to consume Jack, which jeopardises the expedition.

Episode 4

Jack Osbourne takes a group of young people on a life-changing odyssey around the globe, testing their nerve in a series of adrenaline-fuelled challenges along the way. In the Arctic Circle, Jack comes down with a suspected case of malaria and has to be taken to hospital. Is the adventure over for the young explorers?

Episode 5

Jack Osbourne takes five young people around the world to experience a life-changing odyssey as they engage in a series of adrenaline-fuelled adventures. Jack enlists his recruits on a week of hard knocks at China's toughest kung fu school, in what may be their most difficult challenge yet.

Episode 6

Jack Osbourne takes five young recruits around the world on a series of adrenaline-fuelled adventures. Jack takes his recruits to the Mongolian outback for a week-long traditional nomadic cattle drive.

Episode 7

Jack Osbourne takes the recruits to Hawaii, challenging them to a dive in shark infested waters.

Episode 8

Jack Osbourne takes five young people around the world to experience a life-changing odyssey as they engage in a series of adrenaline-fuelled challenges. Jack and his recruits round up their global adventure by sky diving from a World War II aircraft into the blue skies of California.

=== Mongol Rally ===
Jack Osbourne: Mongol Rally began on ITV2 Saturday 13 October 2007. The last episode of the series was broadcast on ITV2 Saturday 20 October 2007.

Episode 1

Jack and 5 friends attempt to drive from Hyde Park in London all the way to Ulanbattar, Mongolia in 4 weeks. They have to do this in the biggest piece of shit they find; Jack's Fiat Panda only costing £350. In the first episode they reach 6500 miles but there were melt downs and break downs.

Episode 2

Jack and his friends reach Mongolia, however Jack's Fiat Panda died and Jack and his friend had to go buy a mini bus.

== Series 4 ==
The fourth series Jack Osbourne: Celebrity Adrenaline Junkie began on ITV2 at 9:00pm on Wednesday 24 September 2008. The last episode of the series was broadcast on ITV2 at 9:00pm on Wednesday 12 November 2008.

Episode 1

Jack Osbourne and the gang of well known faces take on some of the toughest adrenaline thrills challenges the world can offer. In this episode, he is joined by Hollywood star Elijah Wood as they go white water rafting on the Zambezi River, cross the world's largest waterfall on a rope, and undertake a terrifying canyon swing.

Episode 2

Jack Osbourne and his celebrity companions take on more of the toughest adrenaline thrills challenges the world can offer. In the Alps he is joined by Happy Mondays icon Bez, Ex-EastEnder Charlie Brooks and Shameless's Jody Latham. They take on the world's biggest bungee down the front of the dam which featured in GoldenEye, build their very own ice hotel in the mountains, and undertake a terrifying mid-air jump from one cable car to another.

Episode 3

Jack Osbourne and his celebrity companions take on more of the toughest adrenaline thrills challenges the world can offer. Still in the Alps with Happy Mondays icon Bez, ex-EastEnder Charlie Brooks and Shameless's Jody Latham, the adrenaline kicks up a notch as they attempt a terrifying leap from one cable car to another, before taking on the most dangerous motor racing circuit in Europe. They round off their adventure with some Swiss pant wrestling and a spot of wing walking.

Episode 4

Jack Osbourne and his celebrity companions take on more of the toughest challenges the world can offer. He is joined by fashion model Jodie Kidd, actor John Thomson and ex-Busted band member Matt Willis in New Zealand, where they fly through the mountains suspended under a helicopter, climb ice walls, cross a raging river on a tightrope and bungee jump from a cable car.

Episode 5

Jack Osbourne and his celebrity mates continue their quest to seek out the world's biggest adrenaline rushes. Jack is still in New Zealand with supermodel Jodie Kidd, actor John Thomson, and ex-Busted bandmember Matt Willis, where they undertake a gruelling 24-hour adventure race involving sea kayaking, cycling, waterfall jumping and running, followed by a terrifying bungy jump from a cable car. After kayaking John quits and then it's left to Jack, Matt and Jodie to continue. Then they have to traverse from a huge rock or they face a 20-minute penalty. Soon it's back to biking then caving which they do with a heavy heart.

Episode 6

Jack Osbourne and his celebrity companions continue their quest to seek out the world's biggest adrenaline challenges. R&B star Craig David, presenter Emma Griffiths, and Huey from the Fun Lovin' Criminals join Jack to spend a terrifying night strapped to the side of a cliff, descend into the world's biggest hole, and learn how to box in Mexico City.

Episode 7

Jack Osbourne and his celebrity companions continue their quest to seek out the world's biggest adrenaline challenges. He continues to learn how to box in Mexico City's tough gyms with Craig David, presenter Emma Griffiths and Huey from the Fun Lovin' Criminals. Their training involves getting in the ring with a bull, and taking part in an Indian fire ceremony, before their tuition culminates in a fierce bout against a professional opponent.

Episode 8

Jack Osbourne takes a gang of famous friends on a mission to find the toughest adrenaline challenges in the world. In Africa he is joined by ex-Hollyoaks babe Gemma Atkinson, Harry Potter star Tom Felton and Coronation Street's Wendi Peters; where they bunjee jump from a terrifyingly high bridge, go nose-to-nose with great white sharks and freefall parachute from a helicopter.

== Series 5 ==
The fifth series Jack Osbourne: Celebrity Adrenaline Junkie 2 began on ITV2 at 9:00pm on Tuesday 15 September 2009. The last episode of the series was broadcast on ITV2 at 9:00pm on Tuesday 20 October 2009.

Episode 1

Reality TV star Jack Osbourne returns with a new series of the show in which he and a select bunch of fearless stars travel the world to experience the most extreme sports and death-defying feats they can. Today it is a family affair, as Jack is joined by his rock star dad Ozzy and mum Sharon. His parents are certainly up for the globe-trotting adventure, but will they be so keen after a few days of skydiving, rock crawling and even floating in zero gravity?

Episode 2

Reality TV star Jack Osbourne continues his adventures with his parents Ozzy and Sharon. They head to the southern tip of Argentina, to go on a two-day dog-sledding expedition into the remote mountains in the freezing cold. They will sleep in a basic log cabin without water or electricity. But first they will have to learn how to handle a dog team, which is no easy matter - as they find out when first Sharon, then Ozzy is slammed into the snow. Has Jack finally pushed his parents too far?

Episode 3

Jack Osbourne heads to New Zealand for some action-packed adventures with Gavin & Stacey star Joanna Page, Desperate Housewives Jesse Metcalfe and presenter and DJ Reggie Yates. The celebs are thrown in the deep end straight away, with a bungee jump from Auckland Harbour Bridge. Then they go to Queenstown to brave the world's largest canyon swing. And after a freezing night, the group face dangling off the side of a mountain attached to a helicopter. Will they have the bottle for Jack's most dangerous stunt yet?

Episode 4

Jack Osbourne, Joanna Page, Jesse Metcalfe and Reggie Yates continue their adrenaline-pumping experiences. Jack decides to put the others through one more test in New Zealand before they leave for fresh challenges, so they get ready for a night-time bungee jump high above Queenstown. Then they head to Dubai, for more competitive adventures. After a game of camel polo, they go deep into the desert for a spot of dune bashing before facing off in a powerboat race - who will come out on top?

Episode 5

Jack Osbourne heads into the Canadian Rockies with Natalie Imbruglia, The Lord of the Rings star Billy Boyd, and Konnie Huq. Their first challenge is climbing the 8000 foot high Mount Fable, but it is not long before they run into trouble - including a dangerous electrical storm. Next they face a home-made canyon swing thousands of feet up, before going into the woods for some high-speed mountain biking. Jack rounds the trip off by taking the celebs deep underground for a caving expedition.

Episode 6

Jack Osbourne, Natalie Imbruglia, Billy Boyd and Konnie Huq head to Hawaii for more adrenaline-fuelled adventures. They try out the dangerous challenge of free diving - deep diving without breathing apparatus. Next Jack takes the team on a kayaking trip down the remote volcanic coastline, ending up in a night on a deserted beach. Finally they indulge in a famous Hawaiian pastime - surfing. How will the celebs get on?
