= Mike Disa =

American director, screenwriter and animator

- Born: Michael Disa; United States
- Education: St. Joseph High School
- Alma mater: Northern Illinois University
- Occupations: Director, screenwriter, animator
- Spouse: Laura Hogan
- Website: mikedisa.com

Michael Disa is an American director, screenwriter and animator. He began working as an animator at Disney in the mid-1990s, where he was involved with several films up until the late-2000s. During this time, he also worked on non-Disney animated films, including Looney Tunes: Back in Action, and Barnyard. He made his directorial debut with The Origin of Stitch, Disney's 2005 direct-to-DVD short sequel to Lilo & Stitch. At one point he was attached to direct an animated prequel to Disney's 1937 film Snow White and the Seven Dwarfs, but he dropped out due to creative differences, and the project was cancelled. After growing disillusioned with Disney, Disa left the studio to become an independent filmmaker. His first feature film, Hoodwinked Too! Hood vs. Evil was released in 2011. Disa followed this with Postman Pat: The Movie, which was released in 2014.

== Early life ==
Disa was raised on the south side of Chicago, Illinois, near Marquette Park. His parents, Mike and Judy, were both graduates of Northern Illinois University, and his father worked as an art teacher for forty-two years at Curie Metropolitan High School and Harper High School. He grew up in a large Irish Catholic family and served as an altar boy at St. Francis of Assisi Parish, where his uncle was a pastor.

Disa attended St. Joseph High School and graduated from Northern Illinois University in 1987 with degrees in art and computer programming.

== Career ==
Disa moved to Los Angeles, California in 1990, where he was homeless for six months until he found a job doing digital cleanup of individual animation frames on educational CDs for $1.50 a frame. He went on to do effects works on films, video game design, freelance work on the animated television series Tiny Toon Adventures, and animation for Hanna-Barbera Productions. He eventually joined as an animator at the Walt Disney Company, where he worked on Pocahontas (1995), The Hunchback of Notre Dame (1996), Hercules (1997), Mulan (1998), Tarzan (1999), Fantasia 2000 (2000), The Tigger Movie (2000), Atlantis: The Lost Empire (2001), Treasure Planet (2002), Home on the Range (2004), and Pooh's Heffalump Movie (2005). He also worked on Looney Tunes: Back in Action (2003), before spending a year developing a film called Wings with Warner Bros. that ultimately was not produced. He then directed and co-wrote The Origin of Stitch (2005), a direct-to-DVD short sequel to Disney's 2002 Oscar-nominated film Lilo & Stitch. The Origin of Stitch earned a DVDX award nomination for best additional original material.

Disa worked as a storyboard artist on Nickelodeon's animated film Barnyard (2006) and Disney's direct-to-DVD, animated film Tinker Bell (2008). He left Disney for a time, but was asked to return to the studio to develop The Seven Dwarfs, an animated prequel to Snow White and the Seven Dwarfs, which would have been produced by DisneyToon Studios. He left over creative differences when executives wanted Dopey to talk, a decision that he felt disrespected the original film in which the character is silent. The film was cancelled by 2007. Growing frustrated with the creative restraints of working on studio produced films, Disa left to become an independent filmmaker. He spent a year working on Rob Zombie's animated film The Haunted World of El Superbeasto (2009), and was then asked to direct a sequel to the 2005 independent, animated film Hoodwinked!. Although he had not previously seen the original film, he was impressed with the script for the sequel and was announced as the film's director in March 2007. The film finished production in 2009 and was originally scheduled for release in January 2010, but its release was delayed by its distributor, The Weinstein Company. The film's production company, Kanbar Entertainment, claimed that this breached an agreement and sued The Weinstein Company in March 2010. This gave Disa six months to direct the direct-to-DVD animated films Dante's Inferno: An Animated Epic and Dead Space: Aftermath, both adaptations of video games by EA. Hoodwinked Too! Hood vs. Evil was released in April 2011.

Disa also voiced several characters in Hoodwinked Too! Hood vs. Evil such as Helmut, Spider, Rhino and HEA Agents 1 and 2.

In September 2011, Disa was announced as the director of Postman Pat: The Movie — You Know You're the One, an animated, feature film adaptation of the British stop motion, children's television series Postman Pat. The film's release date was originally scheduled for May 2013, but was moved until May of the following year.

Disa also teaches at the California Institute of the Arts.

== Personal life ==
Disa met his wife, Laura Hogan, while at Northern Illinois University. He is a Catholic and his patron saint is St. Michael, the patron saint of police officers. Many of his family members were police officers, including his grandfather, and St. Michael was his father's patron saint as well.

== Filmography ==
Year	Title	Credits	Characters
1991	Taz-Mania (TV Series)	Animation Posing Artist - 1 Episode	
1991	Yo Yogi! (TV Series)	Storyboard Artist - 19 Episodes / Assistant Storyboard Artist - 4 Episodes	
1992	Cool World	Effects Animator	
1992	Bebe's Kids	Effects Animator	
1995	Casper	Digital Reference Technician	
1995	Pocahontas	Breakdown Artist	Native Americans
1996	The Hunchback of Notre Dame	Breakdown Animator	Phoebus
1997	Hercules	Breakdown Artist	Hercules
1998	Mulan	Additional Rough Inbetweener	
1999	Tarzan	Additional Rough Inbetweener	
2000	Fantasia 2000	Animating Assistant	
2000	The Tigger Movie	Additional Animator	
2001	Atlantis: The Lost Empire	Animator	Mrs. Wilhelmina Bertha Packard and Mister Fenton Q. Harcourt
2002	Treasure Planet	Animator	Long John Silver's Pirate Crew
2003	Captain Sturdy: The Originals (TV Short)	Additional Animator	
2003	Looney Tunes: Back in Action	Animator	
2004	Home on the Range	Animator	Alameda Slim and Junior the Buffalo
2004	Cartoon Monsoon (TV Series)	Writer / Director - 1 Episode	
2004	Mickey, Donald, Goofy: The Three Musketeers (Video)	Character Animator	
2005	Pooh's Heffalump Movie	Key Animator	
2005	The Origin of Stitch (Video short)	Director / Animator	
2006	Barnyard	Storyboard Artist	
2008	Tinker Bell (Video)	Storyboards	
2009	The Haunted World of El Superbeasto (Video)	Co-Director / Sequence Director	
2010	Dante's Inferno: An Animated Epic (Video)	Co-Director	
2011	Dead Space: Aftermath (Video)	Supervising Director / Story / Sequence Director / Voice Director / CG Storyboard Artist	
2011	Hoodwinked Too! Hood vs. Evil	Director / Screenplay / Voiceover Actor / Storyboard Artist	Helmut (voice) / Spider (voice) / Rhino (voice) / Agent 1 & 2 (voice)
2014	Space Dogs: Adventure to the Moon	English Version Director / Writer / Additional Voice	
2014	Postman Pat: The Movie	Director	Jess / UMD 300 (voice)
2017	Space Dogs Family (TV Series)	Producer / Writer	
2017	Wacky Races (TV Series)	Director - 2 Episodes / Producer / Story by - 2 Episodes / Written by - 1 Episode	
2021	Space Jam: A New Legacy	Animator	
