= Jack Osbourne =

British television personality (born 1985)

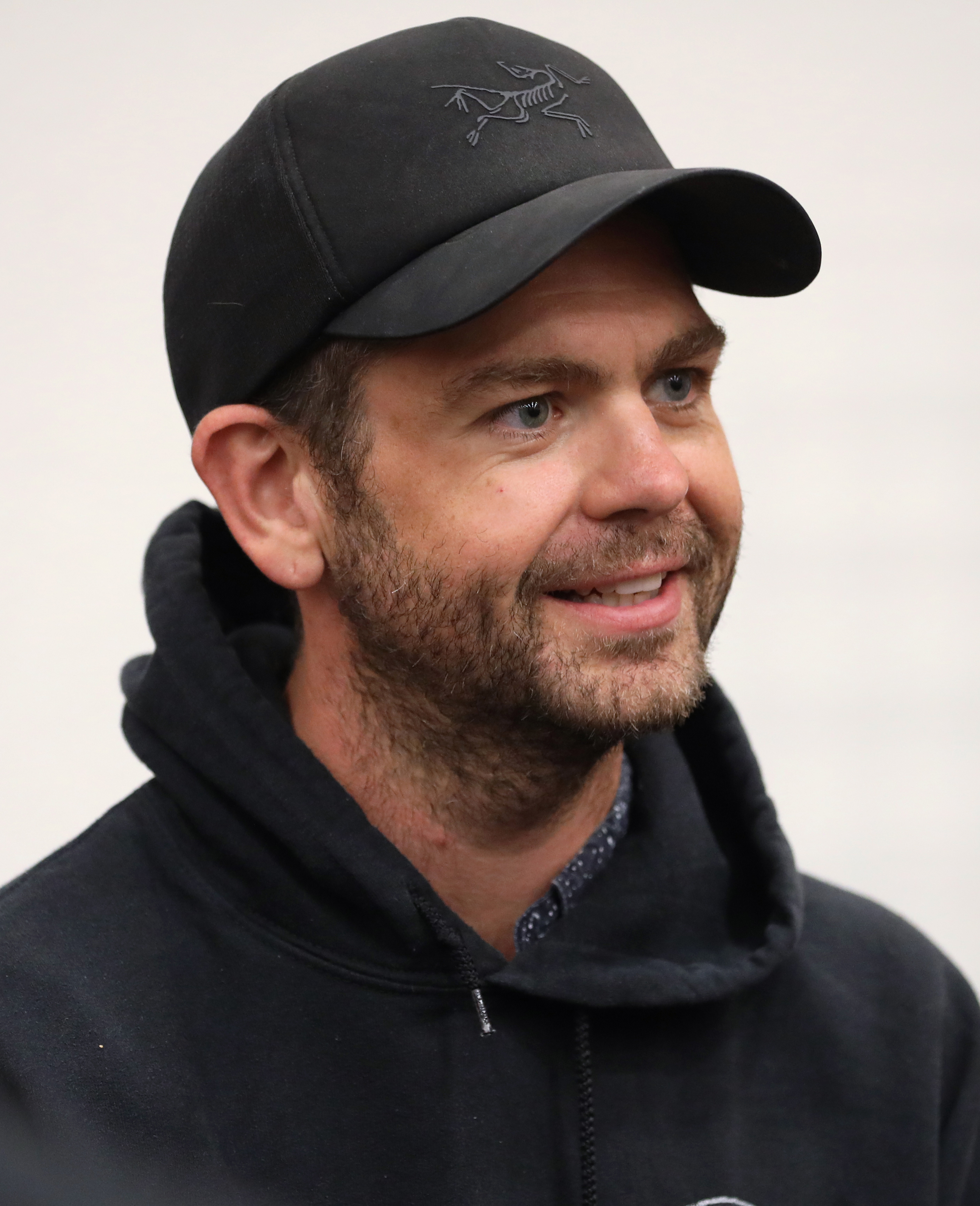
- Osbourne in 2024
- Born: Jack Joseph Osbourne; 8 November 1985 (age 41); London, England
- Citizenship: United Kingdom; United States
- Occupation: Media personality
- Years active: 2001–present
- Spouses: Lisa Stelly (m. 2012; div. 2019); Aree Gearhart (m. 2023)
- Children: 5
- Parent(s): Ozzy Osbourne (father); Sharon Osbourne (mother)
- Relatives: Aimee Osbourne (sister); Kelly Osbourne (sister); Don Arden (maternal grandfather)

Jack Joseph Osbourne (born 8 November 1985) is a British-American media personality. He is the youngest child of Ozzy Osbourne and Sharon Osbourne. He starred on MTV's reality series The Osbournes (2002–2005), along with his father, mother Sharon, and sister Kelly. Osbourne has since pursued a career as a fitness and travel reporter, presenting shows such as Jack Osbourne: Adrenaline Junkie (2005–2009) and BBC's Saving Planet Earth (2007). In 2016, he and his father travelled the world in the History Channel reality series Ozzy & Jack's World Detour.

== Early life ==
Osbourne was born in London to Ozzy Osbourne and his wife and manager, Sharon (née Levy). He said that his childhood was "perfectly happy and contented". For the first six years of his life, he lived in the Chiltern Hills in Buckinghamshire, then his parents moved the family to Los Angeles, but a year later the family returned to Buckinghamshire. When Osbourne was 11, the family moved back again to Southern California, this time to Beverly Hills. In spite of moving so many times at a young age, Osbourne did not find it disruptive.

One aspect of his life affected by the constant moving was his school life, although Osbourne wasn't perturbed by this, since he "hated" school. He was diagnosed with dyslexia, and ADHD as a child, which, for him, were more reasons not to attend school. At one time, he attended a Christian school in Los Angeles. He returned to England for a year before returning to Los Angeles, where he was enrolled into the special needs Park Century School. At 14, he was offered an internship at Virgin Records, where his mother was managing the band The Smashing Pumpkins. After Sharon stopped managing that band, Osbourne started Scouting for Epic Records, where his father had been on for many years. Osbourne also helped his mother in managing his father's annual touring Variety show, Ozzfest, advising her about promising musical acts.

On his 13th birthday, Osbourne got drunk for the first time on whisky; by the time he was 14, he was drinking regularly and had started smoking marijuana. He started partying heavily, and made headlines on 21 April 2003, when he was admitted to a child psychiatric ward for an addiction to OxyContin. Osbourne's drug addiction escalated after his mother was diagnosed with cancer; he was as well battling with his own depression. His self-destructive behaviour came to a head when he attempted suicide by taking a cocktail of prescription pills and cutting his hands with shards of glass after hearing his girlfriend's ex-boyfriend pick up her phone when he called her. He woke up 12 hours later. Osbourne continued with his drug use until he realised that he "never wants to feel this way ever again" and admitted himself into an adolescent psychiatric ward. He spent 10 days detoxing and was moved to an adolescent rehabilitation centre in Malibu, where he enrolled in a recovery program.

== Career ==
Osbourne gained high visibility in 2002 after appearing in his family's reality television show The Osbournes, which aired on MTV and won an Emmy Award in 2002. In the show, Osbourne was mostly shown as a rebellious teenager who liked to party and to fight with sister Kelly Osbourne. In a song by Tenacious D advertising The Osbournes, Jack Black sings the line "and he's got a big 'fro on his head" to describe Osbourne's curly hair that grew longer until he eventually shaved it off in the third season of the show. In 2002, Osbourne briefly appeared in Austin Powers: Goldmember along with the rest of his family, and subsequently starred in a Super Bowl XXXVI advertisement for Pepsi Twist with sister Kelly. From 2002 to 2003, Osbourne appeared in Season 6 of Dawson's Creek, playing Audrey's childhood friend. He also made cameos in The X Factor (as a "Goth rapper" who sings "Ice Ice Baby"), the fifth season of That '70s Show as a DMV customer and as a dining room guest in the eighth season of Hell's Kitchen. Post-rehab, Osbourne went on in 2003 to star in his own show on Channel 4, Union Jack. In 2004 he played a small role in New York Minute, a film starring the Olsen twins, in which he plays a music promoter named Justin.

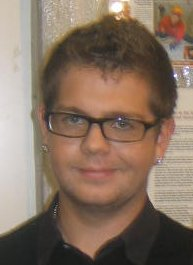
Osbourne at the signing of his autobiography, 21 Years Gone, in 2006

In 2005, Osbourne started to show more of an interest in fitness through co-hosting the ITV2 show, Celebrity Wrestling: Bring It On! In February that year, he appeared in Extreme Celebrity Detox in which he took part in tai chi and climbing exercises. He later appeared in his own programme, Jack Osbourne: Adrenaline Junkie produced by the same production company (Ginger Productions) as Extreme Celebrity Detox. Osbourne lost (50 lb) 23 kg in Thailand at a Muay Thai martial arts camp in Pattaya to be fit enough to climb El Capitan (which he achieved) while filming the first series of Jack Osbourne: Adrenaline Junkie. It aired on ITV2 in the UK, the Travel Channel in the United States, The LifeStyle Channel in Australia, GOtv in South Africa and on MuchMusic in Canada. Adrenaline Junkie focuses on Osbourne's training for sports like rock climbing, mountaineering and a jungle trek in Belize from the Chiquibul Chamber through dense jungle ending at Caracol ruins (guided by the UK extreme conservation organisation Trekforce). He showcased the effects of his weight loss with the two semi-naked photo shoots for Cosmopolitan magazine in 2005 to raise awareness of testicular cancer. The first, taken in June 2005, shows him sitting on a motorbike; the second appeared in the December 2005 issue. After the first series of Adrenaline Junkie he began filling in for Stephen Mulhern on CITV's Saturday morning kids' show Holly & Stephen's Saturday Showdown (which has since ended). Osbourne took part in Sport Relief and faced former singer in the band S Club 7, Bradley McIntosh, in a boxing match of three one-minute rounds to raise money for the charity. Osbourne won by a unanimous decision.

He once claimed to be considering a career in law enforcement and was on reality television show Armed & Famous. The show was pulled from CBS in January 2007, and Osbourne was sued by a woman from Muncie, Indiana, whose house was accidentally raided during filming. Osbourne also filmed a programme in Namibia for the BBC's Saving Planet Earth series. He also took part in the Mongol Rally with News Corporation director Andrew Knight's daughter, Amaryllis Knight. Osbourne and his family reunited with reality TV show Osbournes Reloaded, which debuted 31 March 2009 and was cancelled after the first episode.

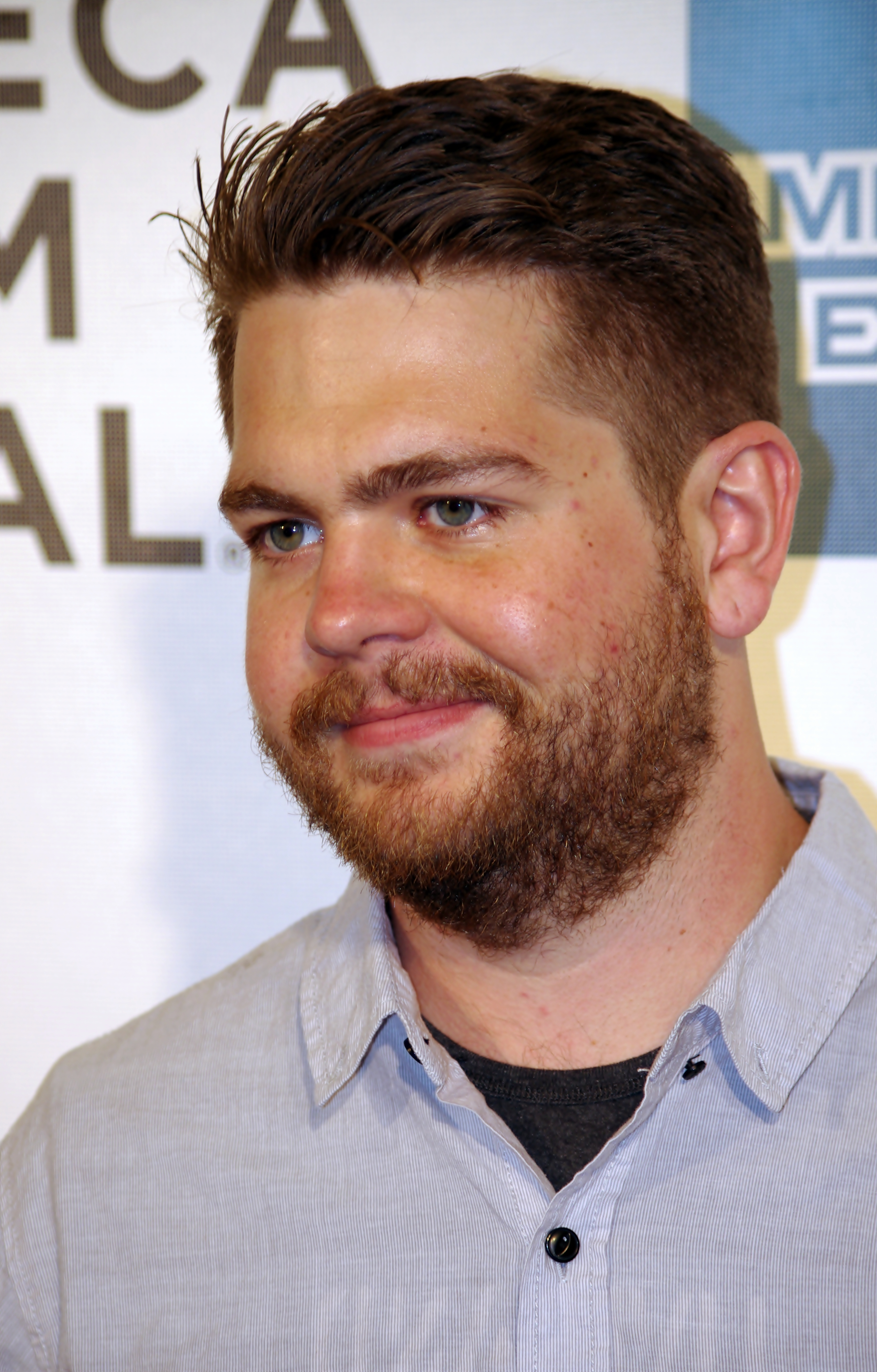
Osbourne in 2011

Osbourne made and produced a documentary about his father that was originally to be titled to Wreckage of My Past: The Ozzy Osbourne Story, but was changed to God Bless Ozzy Osbourne. This film premiered in April 2011 at the Tribeca Film Festival and was released on DVD in November 2011. In early August 2010, Osbourne directed his first music video, for his dad's song "Life Won't Wait" from the album Scream. The video debuted on 23 August. Osbourne worked for Fuse News from February 2013 to early 2014. Osbourne also had a paranormal investigation show titled Haunted Highway that aired on Syfy for two six-episode seasons, during the summers of 2012 and 2013.

Between 2016 and 2018, Osbourne appeared with his father Ozzy in the US worldwide buddy travelogue series Ozzy & Jack's World Detour on the History Channel. He currently has three paranormal television shows featured on the Travel Channel, which are Jack Osbourne's Night of Terror, Portals To Hell and The Osbournes Want To Believe that starred both of his parents, until Ozzy’s death on 22 July 2025.

In November 2025, Osbourne joined the cast of the twenty-fifth series of I'm a Celebrity... Get Me Out of Here!. He was eliminated on 5 December, alongside Lisa Riley finishing in sixth place.

== Personal life ==
Osbourne became a naturalised citizen of the United States in 2012.

In 2012, Osbourne and his then-girlfriend, actress Lisa Stelly, had their first child, and married in Hawaii. On 6 September 2013, Stelly said she had suffered a miscarriage in her second trimester; they had been expecting a son. Their next child was a daughter and they had a third daughter. The couple announced their separation on 18 May 2018. Their divorce was finalised on 5 March 2019.

Osbourne became engaged to interior designer Aree Gearhart in December 2021. They welcomed their first child. Osbourne and Gearhart subsequently secretly married at the San Ysidro Ranch in California in September 2023. In December 2025, it was announced that he and Gearhart were expecting their second child; his fifth and her second. Their second daughter was subsequently born.

In June 2012, Osbourne announced that he had been diagnosed with relapsing-remitting multiple sclerosis. He had experienced symptoms for a number of years including blindness in one eye; numbness in both legs; and problems with his bladder, bowel, and stomach. Osbourne injects Copaxone medication daily, uses vitamin supplements and hormone replacement therapy, and has travelled to Europe for stem cell therapy. He has also made lifestyle changes such as minimising stress, exercising regularly, and significantly altering his diet. However, he has spoken of his fear of a rapid decline and has admitted that his doctors have urged him to stop participating in highly intensive physical workouts: "Right now am I going to be in a wheelchair? No. But if I don't take care of myself, who knows?" While appearing on Dancing with the Stars in October 2013, Osbourne said that he did not suffer from "any severe symptoms other than the odd bit of tingling down my leg and the occasional bout of fatigue."

== Filmography ==
=== Television ===
Television appearances
Year	Title	Role	Notes
2002–2005	The Osbournes	Himself	Main cast (52 episodes)
2002	Dawson's Creek	Himself	Episode: "The Kids Are Alright"
2003	That '70s Show	Andy	Episode: "Misty Mountain Hop"
2003	Union Jack (UK)	Host	TV series
2004	The X Factor (UK)	Himself	Guest judge (Series 1, episode 1)
2004	The F Word (UK)	Himself	Contestant
2005	Jack Osbourne: Adrenaline Junkie	Himself	Host; also executive producer (2 seasons)
2007	Ozzy & Jack's World Detour (Pilot)	Himself	Unaired pilot for a travel series
2007	Monty Python: Almost the Truth (The Lawyers Cut)	Himself	Documentary miniseries
2008	Gonzo: The Life and Work of Dr. Hunter S. Thompson	Himself	Documentary
2009	Jack Osbourne's Celebrity Adrenaline Junkie	Himself	Host
2009	You Don't Know Jack	Himself	Documentary miniseries
2010	Jack Osbourne: Fearless	Himself	Host; documentary series
2012–2013	Haunted Highway	Himself	Co-host; investigator (2 seasons); also executive producer
2013–2014	Fuse News	Himself	Correspondent
2013	Dancing with the Stars	Himself	Contestant (Season 17)
2014	The Osbournes: Reloaded	Himself	Pilot
2014	Jack Osbourne's Night of Terror	Himself	TV special
2015	Ozzy & Jack's World Detour	Himself	Co-host (3 seasons); also executive producer
2019–2020	Portals to Hell	Himself	Co-host / Lead Investigator
2020–2021	The Osbournes Want to Believe	Himself	Host; also executive producer
2021	Home Sweet Home	Himself	Guest
2021	Jack Osbourne's Haunted Homecoming	Himself	Host; TV special
2022	The Conners	Himself	Episode: "The Wedding of Dan and Louise"
2022	The Kelly Clarkson Show	Himself	Guest
2023	Special Forces: World's Toughest Test	Himself	Contestant: Season 2 (6 episodes)
2023	The Osbournes: Home for the Holidays	Himself	TV special
2024	Jack Osbourne's Haunted Holiday	Himself	Host; TV special
2025	Cooking with the Stars	Himself	Runner-up
2025	Ozzy Osbourne: Coming Home	Himself	Documentary
2025	Ozzy: No Escape From Now	Himself	Documentary
2025	I'm a Celebrity... Get Me Out of Here!	Himself	Contestant (Series 25)

=== Film ===
Film appearances
Year	Title	Role	Notes
2002	Austin Powers in Goldmember	Himself	Uncredited cameo
2004	New York Minute	Justin	Film
2011	God Bless Ozzy Osbourne	Himself	Documentary; also executive producer
2021	The Nine Lives of Ozzy Osbourne	Himself	Documentary; also executive producer

== Books ==
- Osbourne, Jack (2006). 21 Years Gone | The Autobiography. Pan Macmillan. ISBN 9781743299920.
