= Aimee Osbourne =

English actress and singer (born 1983)

- Born: Aimee Rachel Osbourne; 2 September 1983 (age 42); London, England
- Occupations: Actress; singer
- Years active: 1991–present
- Parents: Ozzy Osbourne (father); Sharon Osbourne (mother)
- Relatives: Kelly Osbourne (sister); Jack Osbourne (brother); Don Arden (maternal grandfather)
- Musical career
- Genres: Synth-pop; trip hop
- Instrument: Vocals
- Label: Epic

Aimee Rachel Osbourne (born 2 September 1983) is an English actress and singer. She is the eldest of three children of Ozzy and Sharon Osbourne, and has three older half-siblings from her father's first marriage.

== Early life ==
Aimee Rachel Osbourne was born on 2 September 1983 at Wellington Hospital in St John's Wood. She is the eldest child of Ozzy and Sharon Osbourne, and the sister of Jack and Kelly Osbourne. She has three half-siblings from her father's 11-year marriage to his first wife, Thelma Riley: Elliot Kingsley, Riley's son whom Ozzy adopted; Louis Osbourne; and Jessica Osbourne. She is Ozzy's second daughter, the oldest being half-sister Jessica. Osbourne's maternal grandfather was the English music manager Don Arden.

== Career ==
Osbourne's first role was as Raquelle in MTV's 2003 adaptation of Wuthering Heights. She later provided voiceover work in the 2014 animated film Postman Pat: The Movie. In addition to her work as an actress, she has been seen in videos, documentaries and reality programs relating to her father's musical career, though she declined to appear on the family's MTV reality series The Osbournes (2002–2005), feeling that doing so would typecast her and affect her musical career. She has expressed discomfort with some of her parents' behaviour on television.

Around 2010, she formed a band and began recording and releasing music under the name ARO (her initials). In contrast to her father's heavy metal music, ARO's music has been described as synth pop, and is influenced by artists like Kate Bush, Portishead, Bjork, and Talking Heads, as well as PJ Harvey and Massive Attack. She has appeared in her own music videos, and her video for "Raining Gold" received two million hits in just two months.

As of July 2020, ARO has performed only three live shows: Union Pool, Brooklyn on 1 April 2015, Mercury Lounge, New York City, on 2 April 2015, and The Echo, Los Angeles, on 9 February 2016.

After ARO released three songs in 2016, ("Raining Gold", "I Can Change" and "Cocaine Style"), very few updates have been posted about ARO's projects. On 17 October 2018, ARO posted a comment on their Instagram page thanking fans for their two years of patience while awaiting new musical releases. ARO released new material on 5 December 2018 with a snippet of a new song called "Beats of My Heart".

ARO's next post, almost two years later on 13 February 2020, announced that a debut album, on the indie record label "Makerecords", would be released soon.

The next update came six months later, on 24 July 2020, when ARO released their first single in four years, "Shared Something With the Night". At the same time, Osbourne revealed that ARO's upcoming LP would be Vacare Adamaré. It was to be released in "EP-like chapters, built around videos for each song", and a live show was also being planned. Vacare Adamaré was released on 30 October 2020.

== Personal life ==
In May 2022, Osbourne narrowly escaped a fire in a Hollywood recording studio. She was saved by fellow record producer and rapper Jamal Rajad. While Osbourne and Rajad survived, producer Nathan Avery Edwards, Rajad's friend, was killed in the blaze, along with Rajad's four cats. Two other people experienced minor smoke inhalation.

== ARO band members ==
- Aimée Osbourne – lead vocals (2015–present)
- Billy Mohler – guitar, bass (2015–present)
- Rene Arsenault – keyboards, programming (2015–present)
- Brendan Buckey – drums (2015–present)
- Kyle Wylde – lead guitar (2019–present)

== Discography ==
=== ARO ===
Studio albums

- Vacare Adamaré (2020)

Singles

- "Raining Gold" (2015)
- "I Can Change" (LCD Soundsystem cover) (2016)
- "Cocaine Style" (2016)
- "Shared Something With the Night" (2020)
- "House of Lies" (2020)
- "Against Mine" (2022)

=== Other ===
- Officially Osbourne: Opening the Doors to the Land of Oz (2002) (Audiobook narration)

== Filmography ==
- Wuthering Heights (2003) - Raquelle
- Postman Pat: The Movie (2014) - Amy Wrigglesworth (voice role)
- Ozzy: No Escape From Now (2025) - Herself
