= Sharon Osbourne =

English and American television personality, music manager, and author (born 1952)

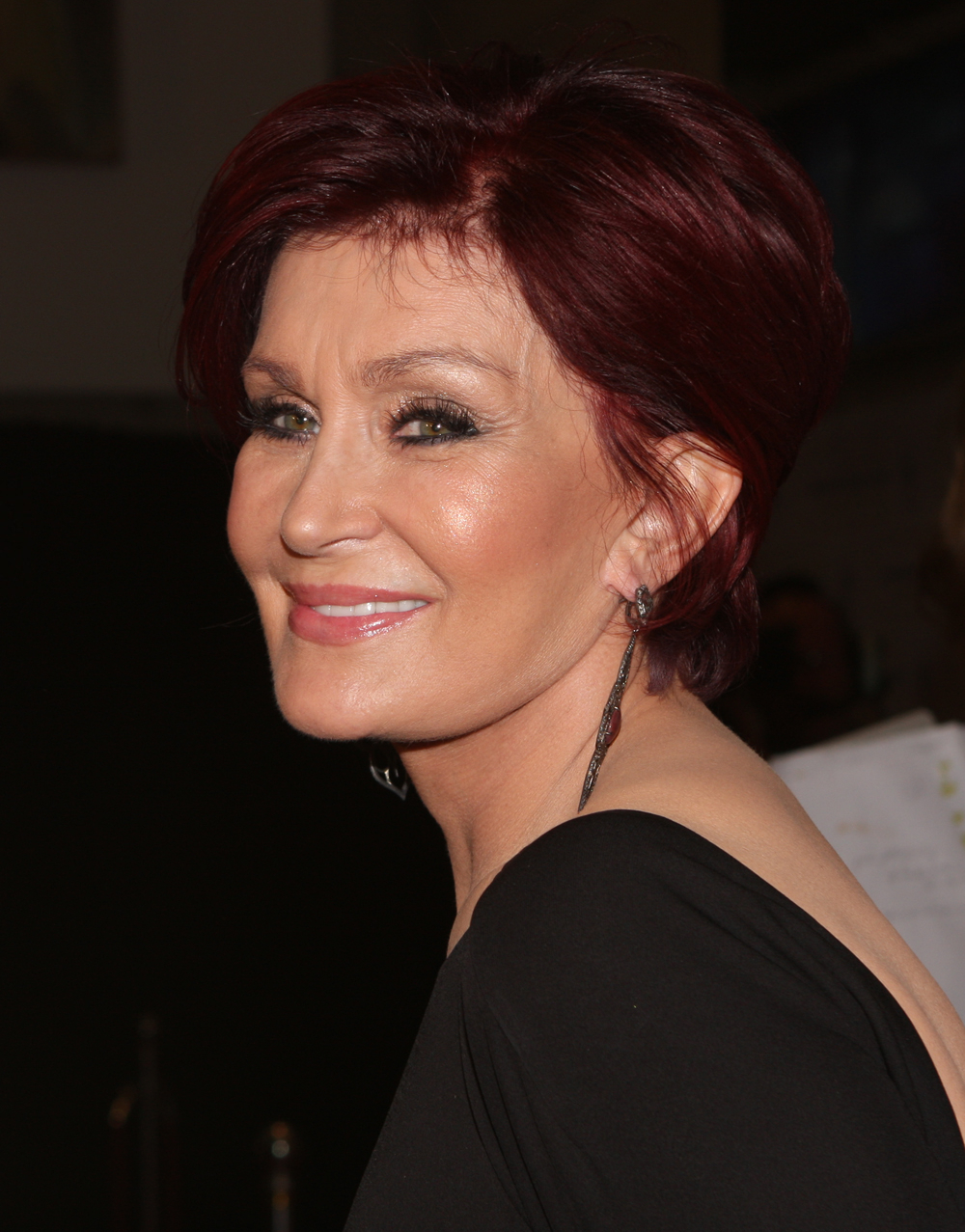
- Osbourne in 2012
- Born: Sharon Rachel Levy; 9 October 1952 (age 74); London, England
- Citizenship: United Kingdom; United States
- Occupations: Television personality; businesswoman; author
- Years active: 1979–present
- Organisation: Sharon Osbourne Management
- Spouse: Ozzy Osbourne (m. 1982; died 2025)
- Children: Aimee; Kelly; Jack
- Father: Don Arden
- Website: sharonosbourne.com

Sharon Rachel Osbourne (née Levy, later Arden; born 9 October 1952) is an English and American television personality, businesswoman and author. She came to prominence while appearing on The Osbournes (2002–2005), a reality television show that aired on MTV, which followed her family's daily life. Osbourne later became a judge on television talent competition shows, including The X Factor (2004–2007, 2013, 2016–2017) and America's Got Talent (2007–2012).

Osbourne was married to heavy metal singer Ozzy Osbourne from 1982 until his death in 2025. She is credited with reviving her husband's heavy metal career by founding the summer Ozzfest tour, which was held almost annually between 1996 and 2018. In light of her success managing her husband, she branched out into managing other acts, such as Gary Moore, Motörhead, Lita Ford, The Quireboys and The Smashing Pumpkins, through her company Sharon Osbourne Management.

From 2003 to 2004, Osbourne hosted her own television talk show The Sharon Osbourne Show, which was syndicated to various American channels and also shown in the UK on Sky One. In 2010, she was a contestant on the NBC reality show The Celebrity Apprentice, and became a co-host on the CBS talk show The Talk, hosting until her termination in 2021. In 2022, she joined TalkTV, hosting a prime time show also titled The Talk. In 2024, she appeared as a celebrity lodger on the twenty-third series of the ITV reality show Celebrity Big Brother. As an author, Osbourne has released three autobiographies and two novels.

== Early life ==
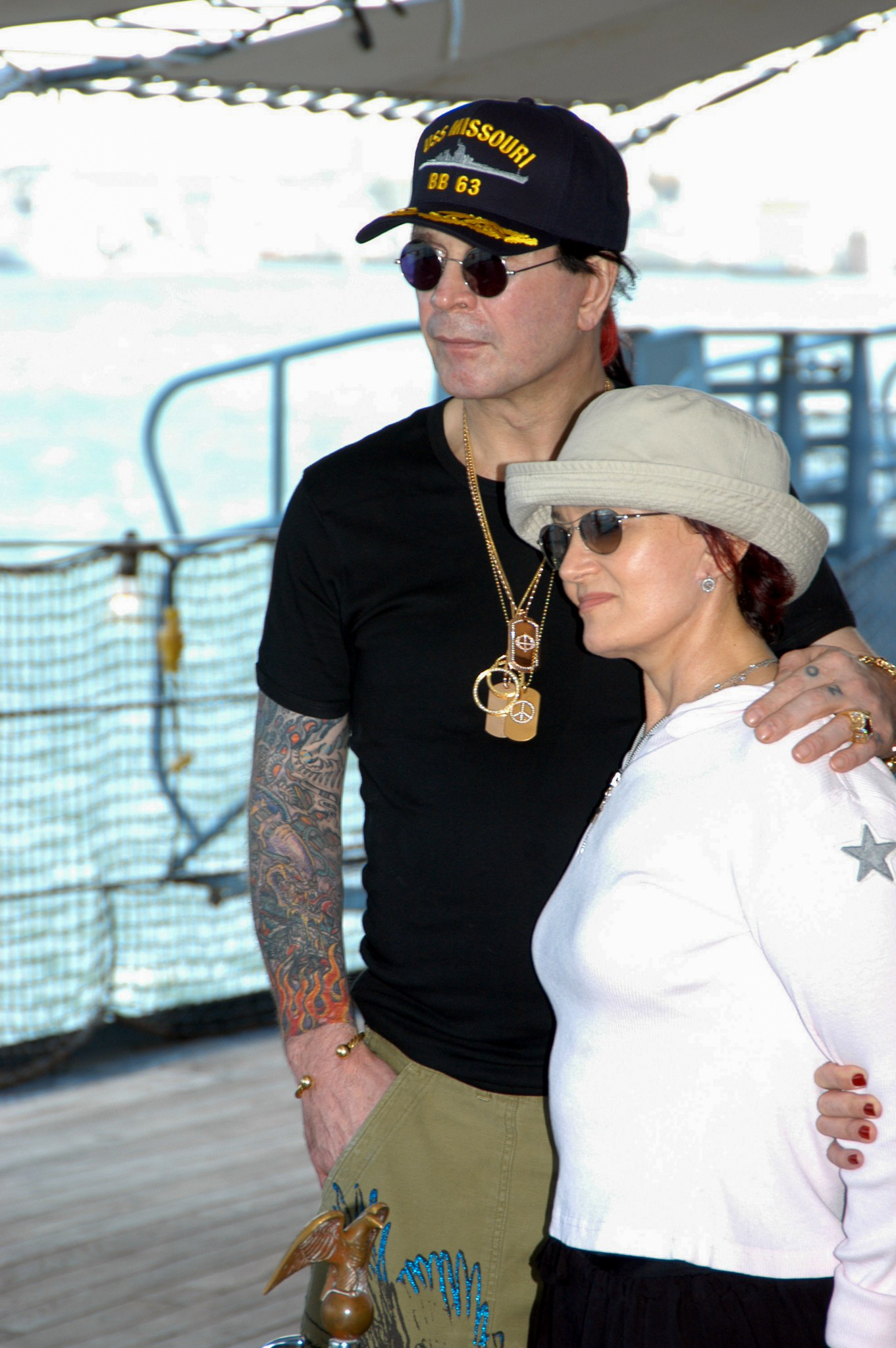
Sharon and Ozzy Osbourne in March 2004

Sharon Rachel Levy was born on 9 October 1952 in London, United Kingdom, the daughter of music promoter and rock and roll entrepreneur Don Arden (born Harry Levy; 1926–2007) and his wife, Hope (née Shaw; 1916–1999). She has a brother, David. Her mother was of Irish descent and her father was Ashkenazi Jewish.

Osbourne revealed she was surrounded by violence during her childhood and that it was a normal occurrence to see her father threatening someone, or brandishing a firearm. Her father managed Black Sabbath and fired Ozzy Osbourne from the group. Subsequently, she began dating Ozzy in 1979, and eventually took over his management from the Arden organisation. She coordinated the recruitment of a backing band (Randy Rhoads, Bob Daisley, and Lee Kerslake) for the recording of the Blizzard of Ozz album and helped Ozzy launch what became a successful solo career. Arden resented his daughter for dating Ozzy and for managing his career. In her memoir, Osbourne relates that her father had robbed her, once tried to kill her, and once told Ozzy that she had tried to seduce him, to turn Ozzy against her. She soon lost contact with her father and did not speak to him for 20 years. In an interview in 2001, she commented that her father has never seen her children and that "he never will". Osbourne had told her children that their grandfather was dead but they unknowingly saw him for the first time when Osbourne was shouting abuse at him on a street in Los Angeles. When asked who she was shouting at, she replied Tony Curtis. They were reunited in 2001 and he then had a role in their reality show, The Osbournes. In August 2004, Osbourne stated her father had Alzheimer's disease and she paid for his care in the last years of his life.

Osbourne's relationship with her mother was also damaged. At the age of 17, Osbourne lost her virginity and realised two months later that she was pregnant. By her account, pressure from others, principally her mother, influenced her decision to have an abortion, which Osbourne has described as the biggest mistake in her life. While visiting her parents on a later occasion, her mother's dogs attacked her and it was some time before her mother appeared to call them off. She was pregnant at the time and subsequently lost the baby. According to a 2009 article in The Guardian, Hope Arden was a cold woman who became even stranger after a serious car accident, something which Osbourne said "unhinged her". When Osbourne was informed of her mother's death, she said "Oh, what a shame" and simply put the phone down.

== Career ==
=== Ozzfest ===
A series of high-selling albums and world tours followed through the 1980s, eventually bringing about Ozzy's popularity. In 1996, Osbourne created the Ozzfest summer touring festival. It went on to become a regular rock occasion and celebrated a 10th anniversary in 2006. By 2007, the ticket prices had reached £76 and Osbourne announced that the tickets would be free to allow more people the opportunity to attend the concert. Prior to the founding of Ozzfest, Osbourne approached Lollapalooza, another rock/pop festival, to request that Ozzy play at that year's festival, only to be rejected and told that Ozzy was "uncool" and too drugged up. It was then that she decided to launch her own festival. Controversy ensued when she pulled the plug on Iron Maiden's set three times in one performance. She also harassed the singer Bruce Dickinson, and threw eggs at the band.

=== Sharon Osbourne Management ===
In light of her success managing her husband, Osbourne branched out into managing other acts by creating Sharon Osbourne Management. The new company, with Osbourne as its sole employee, managed artists such as Gary Moore, Motörhead, Lita Ford, The Smashing Pumpkins, The Quireboys and Coal Chamber. She co-managed a band called Cube, with Cud guitarist Mike Dunphy. Cube were signed to Polydor Records but had limited success. She has also turned down career guidance requests from Fred Durst, Guns N' Roses, and Courtney Love.

=== Television work (2002–2007) ===
Osbourne gained celebrity status as one of the stars of MTV's reality show, The Osbournes, which followed her family's daily life and had a national audience. As the person who negotiated with MTV to screen the show, she is often credited with bringing about her husband's emergence from heavy metal icon into mainstream celebrity. The show began airing in early 2002, and when, in July 2002, Osbourne was diagnosed with cancer, she insisted that filming should continue. The final episode of the show aired in the US on 21 March 2005. MTV's British affiliate has been airing the show since 2003. The show brought MTV its highest ratings ever in both America and Britain.

The Osbournes' Beverly Hills home (made famous on the show) has since been sold and the Osbournes have taken up residence in another home in Beverly Hills. Her Beverly Hills home was later seen in The X Factor during series two. The show saw that Osbourne was responsible for the livelihood of 12 dogs and employs a dog walker named Cherie. From the mid-1990s until the end of The Osbournes in 2005, she was primarily based in Los Angeles with the rest of her family. Osbourne earned an estimated £11.5 million from The Osbournes.

In 2009, she was included in Yahoo!'s Top 10 TV Moms from Six Decades of Television for the time period 2002–2005. In 2003, Osbourne became the host of her own television talk show, The Sharon Osbourne Show, which was syndicated to various US channels and also shown in the UK on Sky One. The show was meant to be a reflection of her personality and home life, similar to her reality show but with the inclusion of guest interviews and performances. During the episodes, she conducted some of her interviews on a giant bed. However, the ratings were never successful and critics panned her inability to perform the basic tasks required of a talk show host, such as reading cue cards and conducting interviews. The show was cancelled in early 2004 after one season.

In 2006, UK TV network ITV commissioned a new chat show, initially to be called Mrs Osbourne Presents, but eventually just named The Sharon Osbourne Show. Osbourne signed a deal with ITV for a reputed £2 million. The show began on Tuesday 29 August 2006, and was scheduled to run for six weeks in the 5 pm weekday timeslot. The premiere episode proved a close competition as the show received 1.9 million viewers with 17% share – 400,000 viewers (and 3% share) ahead of Richard & Judy on Channel 4. Her second show attracted 2.1 million viewers. However, ratings appeared to decrease after Channel 4 moved its game show Deal Or No Deal, hosted by Noel Edmonds, into the timeslot, with Osbourne managing 1.2 million viewers compared to Deal Or No Deal's 2.9m. Channel 4's The New Paul O'Grady Show returned on Monday 25 September 2006 with 2.3 million viewers compared to Osbourne's 1.6 million.

Osbourne was a judge and mentor on the UK's The X Factor every year, from 2004 through to 2007. In the first series she mentored the 16–24s and chose Roberta Howett, Cassie Compton and Tabby Callaghan to represent her in the live rounds of the show. The best placed of these was Tabby, who became the last contestant eliminated. The final was contested between Simon Cowell's act Steve Brookstein and Louis Walsh's act G4, with Steve winning. Osbourne's outburst against Steve on the night of the final is widely credited with helping him to win, although according to her autobiography he was well ahead at all stages of the voting.

In the second series she mentored the 25-and-overs, and selected Andy Abraham, Brenda Edwards, Chico Slimani and Maria Lawson to contest the final rounds. Andy Abraham finished in second place to Louis Walsh's act Shayne Ward. During this series, the judges were again required to bring the selected candidates to their homes. Osbourne chose her Beverly Hills home as a suitable location, which saw Osbourne inviting her neighbours and husband Ozzy Osbourne to attend live performances by the candidates. During Chico's performance, he jumped into her functioning fountain with a live microphone and proceeded to splash water.

Osbourne also appeared in the spin-off show The X Factor: Battle of the Stars. She was not required to choose her celebrity singing contestants but was selected to manage the 16–24s which were made up of Nikki Sanderson, Matt Stevens and Michelle Marsh.

In the third series of The X Factor in 2006, she was mentoring the 25-and-overs, and selected Ben Mills, Dionne Mitchell, Robert Allen and Kerry McGregor. Kerry and Dionne were voted out in a double elimination on 28 October, Robert was voted out on 18 November and Ben was voted out on 9 December, sending Osbourne out of the competition. During the filming of the third series, Osbourne lived at the Dorchester Hotel in central London.

Osbourne was criticised for her outbursts on the show, where before a live show in series three she reportedly spoke out against Who Wants to Be a Millionaire? presenter Chris Tarrant, who was in the show's audience prior to filming. Tarrant had made a joke about her husband Ozzy to which Osbourne took offence, but most of her outburst focused on criticising Tarrant's recent infidelity to his wife Ingrid from whom he was in the process of separating. It was rumoured that Cowell, fellow judge and creator of the show, was displeased with her performance in series three, and was thinking of replacing her and Walsh for the next series. However, it was confirmed that Osbourne had been contracted to return for the fourth series of the show. She then appeared in the fourth series along with judges Cowell, Walsh and new judge, Dannii Minogue, and mentored the Girls category during the series.

During the first live show, aired on 20 October 2007, Osbourne walked out on the panel after learning of two of her own contestants, Kimberley Southwick and Alisha Bennett, being in the bottom two. However, on The Paul O'Grady Show, aired on 23 October 2007, Osbourne confirmed she would return on the next episode and stated that it is part of her personality to say things in the heat of the moment and not to contrive anything that she says. Two weeks into the live shows, a number of happy slapping videos of Emily Nakanda, the only other contestant in Osbourne's category, appeared in the media, apparently showing her beating another teenaged girl. The resulting backlash resulted in Nakanda withdrawing from the show. On 17 November, Bennett was voted out of the competition, leaving Osbourne with no acts halfway through the series.

=== Later work (2007–present) ===
Osbourne joined the judging panel on the second season of America's Got Talent, along with Piers Morgan and David Hasselhoff, replacing Brandy Norwood. Osbourne later worked on the show with Howie Mandel and Howard Stern as judges and Nick Cannon as host.

The season premiered in the United States on 5 June 2007. In her first episode, Osbourne came into a conflict with Piers Morgan when she felt he judged a child contestant too harshly. She threatened to leave the show in the middle of filming, saying "I didn't sign up for this", but was talked out of it. The incident was shown on air. Osbourne has since stayed with the show for its third, fourth, fifth, sixth, and seventh seasons. The new season was announced in a promotional video shown during a commercial break for season seven's second live show. Osbourne initially stated that she will not return for the season, but later said that she was staying with the show "for now". Following this, she announced she was quitting after a dispute with NBC and the producers of Stars Earn Stripes involving what she believed was disability discrimination against her son Jack.

On 6 June 2008, it was announced in a statement on behalf of Osbourne that she has decided to step down as an X Factor judge after four series on the show. The statement read "Sharon would like to thank the wonderful British public for their enormous support during what's been an exciting ride. She would also like to take this opportunity to thank Simon Cowell and ITV while wishing them all the best for the next series." A spokesman from ITV commented "She has been a tremendous judge and mentor on the programme, but we respect her wish to leave and wish her the very best." Osbourne was replaced by Cheryl Cole. During an interview on Piers Morgan's Life Stories, broadcast on 22 February 2009, Osbourne admitted that the reason for her departure from The X Factor was her fractured relationship with Minogue. She stated "I didn't enjoy working with her at all and didn't fancy the prospect of spending six months sitting next to her."

Osbourne hosted the second season of Rock of Love: Charm School with co-hosts Riki Rachtman and Daniella Clarke on VH1. Osbourne had a physical altercation on 13 December 2008 with contestant Megan Hauserman on the reunion special for the show after Hauserman made derogatory statements about Osbourne's husband, Ozzy. Hauserman reportedly filed a report with the Los Angeles Police Department and has since filed a lawsuit against Osbourne, claiming battery, negligence and infliction of emotional distress. In 2011, Osbourne reached a settlement with Hauserman. In July 2008, Fox announced that the Osbourne family would be hosting a new variety show titled Osbournes: Reloaded (working title was Osbournes: Loud and Dangerous). The show started filming at CBS Studios in Hollywood in December 2008 before a live audience. The show premiered in March 2009. Fremantle Media North America is producing the show. The show was cancelled after its premiere episode. In March 2010, Osbourne appeared on NBC's The Celebrity Apprentice, coming in third place.

From its inception on 18 October 2010 until her departure in 2021, Osbourne co-hosted the CBS talk show The Talk. This decision came after CBS cancelled the soap opera As the World Turns. The show is similar to The View and seeks to address motherhood and other contemporary issues. Osbourne was the last original co-host following the departure of fellow co-host and series creator Sara Gilbert.

In September 2010, Osbourne made a return to The X Factor at the Judges' Houses round of series 7 where she assisted Walsh at Adare Manor, County Limerick, Ireland to pick the final 3 contestants of the Over 28s category, Then in September 2012, she joined Walsh again this time in Las Vegas, for the 9th series Judges' Houses segment of the competition, to help him choose his final 3 groups.

Osbourne has expressed interest in reprising her role on the judging panel, notably in September 2012, when she said that she would 'love' to return for the show's tenth series. Media outlets reported in December 2012 that X Factor producers had approached Osbourne for a return in 2013, reportedly to replace Tulisa. In April 2013, the show's creative director Brian Friedman said that he was "confident" of Sharon Osbourne's return, following her departure from America's Got Talent and replacement by Heidi Klum. It was later announced by ITV that Osbourne would indeed be returning for the tenth series of the show, replacing Tulisa. She returned to the judging panel alongside Gary Barlow, Nicole Scherzinger, and original panellist Walsh. During the live shows, she mentored the Over 25s category which included Lorna Simpson, Shelley Smith and Sam Bailey. Bailey was eventually announced as the winner of the show on 15 December, marking Osbourne's first victory as a mentor in the show's ten-year history. Osbourne did not return for the eleventh series of The X Factor UK and was replaced by Cheryl Fernandez-Versini.

In 2014 and 2017, Osbourne appeared as a guest panellist on ITV's daytime programme Loose Women.

On 1 June 2016, it was announced that once again, Osbourne would return to The X Factor for the show's thirteenth series to replace Cheryl Fernandez-Versini. She judged alongside Cowell, Walsh (who replaced Nick Grimshaw) and Scherzinger (who replaced Rita Ora). She once again mentored the Over 25s category, choosing Saara Aalto, Relley C and Honey G as her top three contestants. Aalto went on to become the series' runner-up. Although initially casting doubt on returning for another series due to her commitments with The Talk, Osbourne returned to The X Factor for the fourteenth series. This time she again mentored the Girls category; her last contestant Grace Davies finished as the runner-up. Osbourne was initially confirmed to return for the fifteenth series as the fifth judge during the live shows portion of the competition but later declined the offer to return, feeling she wasn't needed on the panel and was replaced by Ayda Field.

In 2020, she portrayed herself in season 5, episode 2 of Lucifer.

In March 2022, Osbourne joined TalkTV hosting a new weekly prime time show named "The Talk".

=== Writing ===
Sharon Osbourne's first autobiography, Extreme (co-authored by Penelope Dening), was published in October 2005 and tells of her difficult childhood growing up with her father, Don Arden, and also documents the highs and lows of her marriage to husband Ozzy Osbourne, shedding light on areas of her life previously not commented on. Domestic violence, drug abuse, alcoholism, affairs, bribery, colon cancer, robberies, a plane crash, therapy, and cosmetic surgery are also documented in the autobiography.

Published by Time WarnerBooks, it went to Number 1 on the Sunday Times Bestseller List (UK) where it remained for 15 weeks and sold over 621,000 copies in hardback, becoming the biggest-selling autobiography since British records began, beating the previous record set by David Beckham's autobiography by 100,000 copies. In March 2006 it won Biography of the Year at the British Book Awards. The autobiography has proceeded to sell in excess of two million copies which has become the most successful female autobiography ever.

Osbourne later released another autobiography named Survivor, the title coming from surviving cancer. It was released in 2007. In August 2013, Osbourne announced on Twitter that her third autobiography named Unbreakable, would be released on 10 October 2013.

== Public image ==
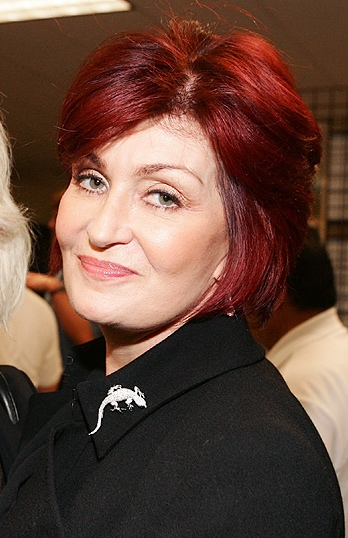
Osbourne in February 2007

On the Sunday Times Rich List 2006, Osbourne was listed as the 44th richest woman in Britain and the 60th richest woman on the 2007 list. In the overall British list in 2006, Osbourne and her husband appeared together as the 554th richest people with a combined wealth of £100 million. As of 2008, the couple was ranked as the 724th richest people in Britain with an estimated joint wealth of £110 million.

Osbourne has sent her son's or daughter's feces in Tiffany boxes on more than one occasion to people she felt had unreasonably criticised her or her family. When a journalist criticised her teenage children, Osbourne sent a box of excrement with a note saying, "I heard you've got an eating disorder. Eat this."

The popular British comedy Dead Ringers, features and spoofs Osbourne (played by Jan Ravens) quite prominently alongside her husband (played by Jon Culshaw). Also, she was spoofed by impressionist Ronni Ancona on Alistair McGowan's Big Impression and was also featured in comedy 2DTV. On Saturday Night Live, Amy Poehler played her on "Celebrity Jeopardy!" skit on 14 May 2005.

Sharon Osbourne appeared in season nine of Celebrity Apprentice. On 16 May 2010, she was fired during the double elimination round. Impressionist Francine Lewis performed an impression of her in the seventh series of Britain's Got Talent. 2003, Osbourne and the rest of her family hosted the 30th Annual American Music Awards. The night was marked with constant "bleeping" due to some of the lewd and raunchy remarks made by both Osbourne and Ozzy. Additionally, the night was met with some controversy, as critics panned their hosting and presenter Patricia Heaton walked out midway in disgust.

In January 2005, she was contracted to feature in a television advertising campaign for UK supermarket chain, Asda and later in 2007, Osbourne became the new face of Galabingo when she was featured in television advertisements promoting the gambling website. She has co-hosted one of the Royal Variety Performances with Jonathan Ross. Osbourne appeared in Days of Our Lives, It's a Boy Girl Thing.

On Friday 15 June 2007, Osbourne guest hosted The Friday Night Project with Justin Lee Collins and Alan Carr. Osbourne also made a cameo appearance on 23 June 2007 in an episode of the science fiction series Doctor Who. The episode "The Sound of Drums" saw her appearing in a spoof party political broadcast, which featured testimonials from British celebrities such as Osbourne and the band McFly showing their support for Mr Saxon to become prime minister.

On 20 February 2008, Sharon Osbourne co-hosted the 28th edition of the BRIT Awards at Earls Court in London, along with her husband and daughter Kelly. During the awards Osbourne caused controversy and sparked complaints by calling Vic Reeves, who was presenting one of the awards, a "piss head" and a "bastard" after he appeared to be drunk, although he claimed that he was having trouble reading the autocue. On 22 August 2008, Osbourne took part in the 2008 MediaGuardian Edinburgh International Television Festival in Scotland. In 2009 she co-hosted WWE Raw with her husband Ozzy.

On 1 April 2010, Sharon Osbourne (along with Kelly Osbourne) joined Cyndi Lauper in the launch of her Give a Damn campaign to bring a wider awareness of discrimination of the LGBT community as part of her True Colors Fund. The organisation campaigns to urge straight people to stand up with the gay, lesbian, bisexual, and transgender community and stop discrimination. Other names included in the campaign are Whoopi Goldberg, Jason Mraz, Elton John, Judith Light, Cynthia Nixon, Kim Kardashian and Clay Aiken. Anna Paquin is also part of the campaign and came out as bisexual. This news clogged the Give A Damn website.

Osbourne has a recurring voice role as Mama Hook in the animated television series Jake and the Never Land Pirates, which was broadcast in 2012.

In 2016, Osbourne appeared in two videos for PETA, explaining why she gave up wearing fur and encouraging others to do the same.

In 2024, Osbourne was among 400 signatories of an open letter urging the organisers of the Eurovision Song Contest to allow Israel's participation and reject calls to bar the country from the competition. In 2025, she was among more than 1,200 entertainment professionals who signed an open letter by Creative Community for Peace opposing a proposed boycott of the Israeli film and television industry and criticising a pledge by Film Workers for Palestine to boycott Israeli cultural institutions.

=== Controversies ===
==== Iron Maiden ====
At Iron Maiden's last Ozzfest performance, on 20 August 2005 at the Hyundai Pavilion at Glen Helen in San Bernardino, California, several negative events took place, allegedly the fault of Sharon Osbourne. Osbourne's actions were reportedly in retaliation to lead singer Bruce Dickinson slighting reality TV, with claims that this was an attack on Ozzy Osbourne himself.

During the first Iron Maiden song, several members of the front row of the crowd (reportedly a combination of Osbourne's entourage and a few members from other bands persuaded by Osbourne or her entourage) were reported to have bombarded the band with eggs, bottle caps, and ice. Some reports also say that Sharon's daughter, Kelly, was throwing objects at the band. During three of Iron Maiden's songs, the PA system was switched off, cutting power to Dickinson's microphone and the band's instruments. In audio captured during the concert, it is reported that Dickinson can be heard accusing the festival's organisers of deliberately cutting off the band's power. Also unknown to Iron Maiden, played secretly through the PA at the very beginning and end of their set was a tape with the chant "Ozzy – Ozzy – Ozzy". On Iron Maiden's departure, Sharon made a few statements on stage in front of the 40,000 people in attendance. She told the audience that while she "absolutely loved Iron Maiden," she thought lead singer Bruce Dickinson was a "prick" and had "disrespected Ozzfest since they began their stint with the tour." Her words were met with booing, and soon afterwards she walked off the stage.

Iron Maiden's manager, Rod Smallwood, issued a statement shortly after the debacle condemning the attack on the band as "vile, dangerous, criminal and cowardly" as well as disrespectful to fans who had paid to see the band perform "a full unhindered performance.". Dickinson later denied making a personal attack on Ozzy Osbourne; "Did I have a go at Ozzy and Black Sabbath? No. Why would I? But I do find The Osbournes TV series loathsome, and the whole cult of reality TV celebrities disgusting."

==== The Smashing Pumpkins ====
In 2000, Osbourne resigned from managing The Smashing Pumpkins by releasing a memo which said, "It was with great pride and enthusiasm that I took on management of the Pumpkins back in October, but unfortunately I must resign today due to medical reasons ... [The Smashing Pumpkins frontman] Billy Corgan was making me sick!!!" In an October 2008 interview, Osbourne revealed that she and Corgan had recently made up: "I saw him at the Scream Awards. We hadn't seen each other since that whole thing in Germany. The first time we ran into each other and we hugged and kissed and laughed."

==== The Talk ====
In July 2011, Osbourne and some of her fellow The Talk panellists were criticised for their conduct when discussing the story of Catherine Kieu. Osbourne described Kieu's cutting off of her husband's penis and putting it in a garbage disposal as "quite fabulous", Osbourne also laughed about the incident with her fellow panellists and members of the audience. Osbourne's cohost Sara Gilbert offered the counterpoint "Not to be a total buzz kill, but it is a little bit sexist. If somebody cut a woman's breast off, nobody would be sitting laughing." Osbourne replied by saying "It's different". Osbourne later apologised for her behaviour, stating "she was sorry she offended people" and that she "did not condone genital mutilation".

Osbourne's co-hosts on The Talk, Leah Remini and Holly Robinson Peete were released from their contracts in 2011. Osbourne spoke of their dismissals in December 2011 on The Howard Stern Show, stating: "Some people don't really know who they are, and you have to know who you are when you're in something like this. You can't pretend to be something you're not. You have to know your brand. You can't be all things to everyone." Remini later protested her dismissal and levelled accusations aimed at Osbourne through a series of tweets.

On 10 March 2021, while speaking on The Talk, Osbourne defended Piers Morgan's negative comments towards Meghan, Duchess of Sussex, resulting in a heated exchange with co-host Sheryl Underwood. Osbourne's behaviour towards Underwood during the argument was criticised as harsh and aggressive. In the same month, a 2018 clip from The Talk resurfaced in which Osbourne was discussing the Duchess of Sussex's skin colour. Osbourne said that Markle "ain't Black" and that "she doesn't look Black". In response, The Talk went on hiatus while CBS conducted a review on Osbourne. In a statement made 26 March 2021, CBS concluded that Osbourne's "behavior toward her co-hosts during the March 10 episode did not align with [CBS] values for a respectful workplace". Ultimately, Osbourne decided to depart from the program.

In the midst of her scandal and termination from The Talk, both Holly Robinson Peete and Leah Remini, Osbourne's former cohosts, took to social media to reproach Osbourne over her conduct in relation to her removal from the show, pointing out that they had been treated similarly by her, citing additional acts of discriminatory behaviours from her towards additional cast members. Osbourne responded with threats of defamation lawsuits against both Peete and Remini, but ultimately did nothing.

==== Fired assistant revelation ====
In 2019, Osbourne appeared on the British panel show Would I Lie to You? in which guests make statements about themselves and fellow panellists guess whether or not the statements are true. She claimed that during a house fire she made her assistant go back into the house to save pieces of art. She also claimed that she ripped an oxygen mask off the assistant and gave it to her dog. She then proceeded to fire him when he did not find the situation funny, believing he might have lung damage from smoke inhalation, saying "he showed absolutely no sense of humour" during the fire. After the usual deliberations by fellow panellists, she confirmed the incident to be true.

The clip of Osbourne's story on the show that was uploaded by the official BBC YouTube Channel was met with an overwhelmingly negative reception. There was also a considerable backlash from Twitter users. Following the backlash, Osbourne backtracked on her claims on The Talk in January 2020. She said: "I told a true story about a fire I had in my house. He went in, he got the paintings out. And then, just to be precocious, I said at the end of this little thing I was doing, 'Oh, and then I fired him.' It was a joke because I was on a comedy show. I fired him about 15 years later." Her response was met with scepticism.

==== Kneecap ====
In April 2025, Osbourne criticised the Coachella organiser Goldenvoice for booking the Irish rap group Kneecap. Their performance included "Free Palestine" chants and projected messages condemning the Gaza war and the Israeli and US governments, which were censored in the livestream. Goldenvoice claimed to be "blindsided" by the solidarity messages in Kneecap's performance, which Osbourne said was "implausible" as she was aware of "certain people in the industry" who had expressed concern about Kneecap's inclusion in the line-up. Osbourne called for the revocation of the band members' work visas. In a response to Rolling Stone, Kneecap member Mo Chara reaffirmed the group's commitment to Palestine solidarity and suggested that Osbourne listen to "War Pigs".

==== Centrepoint ====
Osbourne was previously an ambassador for the homeless charity Centrepoint before it cut ties with her in April 2026 after her support for a far-right march.

== Personal life ==
Sharon Osbourne (then Sharon Levy) met her future husband, Black Sabbath vocalist Ozzy Osbourne, at the age of 18, while working for her father, Don Arden (born Harry Levy), who was managing Black Sabbath at the time. When Ozzy was fired from Black Sabbath in 1979, Sharon started to date him and took over his management as a solo artist. The two were married in Maui, Hawaii, on 4 July 1982. Together, Sharon and Ozzy have three children: Aimee (1983), Kelly (1984) and Jack (1985). Before her successful pregnancies Osbourne had tried three times previously to have children with her husband, each resulting in a miscarriage. Afterwards she had an operation to deal with cervical weakness. The first miscarriage happened after she was attacked by her parents' two dogs. Osbourne attributed her weak cervix to an abortion she had at age 17, which she regrets and felt her mother coerced her into having. Ozzy died on 22 July 2025 after suffering from Parkinson's disease for years.

In July 2002, colon cancer claimed the life of Reagan Erin Marcato, mother of then-18-year-old son Robert who was a friend of Osbourne's daughter Kelly. Osbourne told the BBC that she had adopted Robert. However, when he was later sent to live with his biological father following a nervous breakdown, Osbourne denied having legally adopted him.

Osbourne has taken up falconry, which she has described as helping her cope following Ozzy's death.

=== Health ===
Osbourne had dealt with bulimia for many years. In 1999, Osbourne lost 100 pounds (45 kg) after lap-band surgery (adjustable gastric band). Osbourne commented that being large was an essential part of her persona when she worked for her father and that when she was larger, she made a more dramatic entrance. On 26 October 2006, she went on The Howard Stern Show and revealed that she gained 15 pounds in the last year and would be having her plastic band removed.

In July 2002, Osbourne had surgery for cancer. She announced it was colon cancer and had spread to her lymph nodes and was more serious than originally thought. She survived the disease against a 33% survival prognosis. She insisted that the MTV cameras document her illness during the filming of the second season of The Osbournes. When Osbourne's hair fell out during her subsequent treatment, her wigs were custom made by Cher's wigmaker. Ozzy Osbourne admitted that he "fell apart" during her treatment and recovery, and it was revealed that her son, Jack Osbourne, tried to commit suicide because of depression stemming from his mother's condition.

In August 2004, she founded the Sharon Osbourne Colon Cancer Program at Cedars Sinai Hospital. In addition, she was the honoured guest at the Multiple Myeloma Research Foundation's 2003 Fall Gala, where she spoke of her cancer. Osbourne has lent her support to design limited edition T-shirts or vests for the 'Little Tee Campaign' for Breast Cancer Care which donates money for breast cancer research.

Osbourne has freely admitted to having extensive cosmetic surgery. As well as documenting this in her autobiography, she appeared on Dr. Phil on 14 December 2006, and commented on everything that had been surgically changed on her body to improve her appearance. She stated that she had had a full rhytidectomy, abdominoplasty, mastopexy, as well as many other procedures, but commented that she would not have any surgery performed on her eyes or lips. She has admitted to spending £300,000 on plastic surgery. In early November 2012, Osbourne revealed she had undergone a double mastectomy after learning she had a gene that increases the risk of developing breast cancer.

=== Household incidents ===
For years, the Osbourne marriage was plagued by alcohol, drug use, and violence, with Osbourne having even been arrested for driving while intoxicated. The couple used to physically fight regularly and, according to Osbourne, they would "beat the shit out of each other." She has described herself as "a beaten woman" when she was at the hands of husband Ozzy where he once knocked out her front teeth. She once retaliated by throwing a full bottle of scotch at his head. The most notorious incident arose in August 1989, when Ozzy was arrested for attempted murder after he had returned from the Moscow Music Peace Festival, and tried to strangle his wife in a haze of alcohol and drugs. After the incident, Ozzy spent six months in rehabilitation as a result of his actions, after which time Sharon Osbourne said she regained her strength in their relationship and did not press charges.

In 2004, Osbourne's home in Jordans, Buckinghamshire, was burgled by a man who stole gems worth £2 million. The burglar managed to get away with the gems despite being put in a headlock by Ozzy. Items taken during the burglary included wedding rings, an engagement ring, pearl and diamond necklaces, a large 52 carat (10g) sapphire ring and two pairs of diamond earrings. After the incident, Osbourne appeared on Crimewatch and offered a reward of £100,000 for the return of her valuable jewellery.

In March 2005, there was an incident in the Osbournes' mansion in Jordans, Buckinghamshire. Ozzy and Sharon were forced to flee their mansion when a blaze broke out as they slept. They were not injured but had to be treated for smoke inhalation. In 2006, another fire broke out at the Osbourne's mansion; however, none of the family was at home.

In February 2024, Osbourne revealed that she tried to take her own life in 2016 after learning of her husband's affair with hairdresser Michelle Pugh.

== Filmography ==
=== Television ===
Year	Title	Role	Notes
1996	Rock Wives	Herself	
1998	Behind the Music	Herself	1 episode
2001	Fan Club	Herself	1 episode
2002–2005	The Osbournes	Herself	Main role, also executive producer
2003–2004	The Sharon Osbourne Show	Presenter	Chat show
2004	Days of Our Lives	Herself	2 episodes
2004	Battle for Ozzfest	Herself	Also executive producer
2004	Bo' Selecta!	Herself	2 episodes
2004	Will & Grace	Nonny	Episode: "No Sex 'N' the City"
2004–2016	Ant & Dec's Saturday Night Takeaway	Herself / Guest Announcer	6 episodes
2004–2007, 2013, 2016–2017	The X Factor	Judge	
2005	Top of the Pops	Guest Presenter	1 episode
2006	The X Factor: Battle of the Stars	Judge	
2006	The Sharon Osbourne Show (U.K.)	Presenter	Chat Show
2006–2010	The Big Gay Sketch Show	Herself	8 episodes
2007	Doctor Who	Herself	Episode: "The Sound of Drums"
2007	Shrink Rap	Herself	1 episode
2007	The Friday Night Project	Guest Presenter	2 episodes
2007–2012	America's Got Talent	Judge	Seasons 2–7
2008–2009	Rock of Love: Charm School	Host	
2009	WWE Raw	Co-host	Alongside Ozzy Osbourne; 2 episodes
2009	Osbournes Reloaded	Herself	Main role, also executive producer
2009	Dog Whisperer with Cesar Millan	Herself	Episode: "Inside Puppy Mills"
2009	Piers Morgan's Life Stories	Herself	1 episode
2009–2023	The One Show	Herself	Guest; 6 episodes
2010–2021	The Talk	Co-host	Seasons 1–11
2010	The Celebrity Apprentice	Contestant	Season 9, 3rd place
2010	A Comedy Roast	Herself	Episode: "Sharon Osbourne: A Comedy Roast"
2011	RuPaul's Drag Race	Guest Judge	1 episode
2011	After Lately	Herself	1 episode
2011	God Bless Ozzy Osbourne	Herself	Also executive producer
2011	Same Name	Herself	1 episode
2012	Up All Night	Herself	1 episode
2012–2015	Jake and the Never Land Pirates	Mama Hook (voice)	
2013	The Millers	Herself	1 episode
2013	Family Guy	Herself (voice)	Episode: "No Country Club for Old Men"
2014	The Comeback	Herself	1 episode
2014	CSI: Crime Scene Investigation	Elsie Massey	Episode: "Dead Rails"
2014–2024	Loose Women	Herself	Guest; 10 episodes
2016	Supergirl	Herself	Episode: "Falling"
2016	The Price Is Right	Herself	Celebrity edition
2016	The 7D	Duchess of Drear (voice)	1 episode
2017	Celebrity Gogglebox	Herself	1 episode
2018	Happy Together	Herself	1 episode
2018	Jane the Virgin	Herself	Episode: "Chapter Seventy-Four"
2018	Ozzy & Jack's World Detour	Herself	1 episode
2019	Who Do You Think You Are?	Herself	Documentary
2019	Would I Lie to You?	Herself	Guest; 1 episode
2020	Lucifer	Herself	Cameo appearance; 1 episode
2020	The Masked Singer UK	Guest Judge	Series one, episode 5
2020	The Conners	Herself	1 episode
2020	Kidding	Herself	1 episode
2020–2021	The Osbournes Want to Believe	Herself	28 episodes
2021	Celebrity Watch Party	Herself	6 episodes
2021	Let's Make a Deal	Guest; 1 episode	
2022–2023	The Talk	Host	Weekdays
2022	Shopping with Keith Lemon	Herself	Special guest; 1 episode
2022	The Five	Guest Co-host	1 episode
2024	Celebrity Big Brother	Celebrity Lodger	Series 23

=== Film ===
Year	Title	Role	Notes
2001	We Sold Our Souls for Rock 'n Roll	Herself	Also producer
2002	Austin Powers in Goldmember	Herself	Cameo
2006	Garfield: A Tail of Two Kitties	Christophe	Voice role
2006	It's a Boy Girl Thing	Della Deane	
2012	Sunset Strip	Herself	Documentary

== Awards and recognition ==
- Sharon Osbourne and Ozzy Osbourne were honoured for their contribution to the music industry at a ceremony in London when the couple won a Silver Clef Award.
- Osbourne was voted "the most amazing woman of 2003", according to a poll published by Handbag.com, a website for women, taking almost a third of the votes cast. More than 7,000 votes were cast in a range of categories.
- While Osbourne was suffering from cancer, she attended an award ceremony to collect an award for the success of her family's television show The Osbournes. She attended the Creative Arts Emmy Awards in Los Angeles with her daughter Kelly Osbourne, to receive the best reality television show award.
- In late 2004, Osbourne attended the Woman of the Year awards in London to collect an award that she had previously won at the 2002 event, but was unable to accept due to illness.
- Osbourne was voted Freemans Celebrity mother of the Year in 2006, fending off competition from Jordan, Kate Moss and the Duchess of Cornwall.
- In 2006, Osbourne's autobiography won Biography of the year at the British Book Awards.
- There is a wax figure of Osbourne at Madame Tussauds.
- She is an honorary board member of the Multiple Myeloma Research Foundation.

== Bibliography ==
- Extreme (Sphere, 2006) ISBN 978-0-7515-3766-6
- Survivor (Sphere, 2008) ISBN 978-0-7515-4054-3
- Revenge (Sphere, 2010) ISBN 978-0-7515-4233-2
- Unbreakable (Sphere, 2014) ISBN 978-0-7515-4294-3

Media offices
First	The Talk co-host 2010–2021	Succeeded by Jerry O'Connell
