= Ozzy & Jack's World Detour =

American television series (2016–2018)

- Genre: Reality
- Starring: Ozzy Osbourne; Jack Osbourne; Kelly Osbourne (since Season 3)
- Country of origin: United States
- Original language: English
- No. of seasons: 3
- No. of episodes: 28

Production
- Running time: 42 minutes
- Production companies: Osbourne Media; T Group Productions

Original release
- Network: History (season 1); A&E (seasons 2 & 3); AXS TV
- Release: July 24, 2016 – August 8, 2018

Ozzy & Jack's World Detour is an American reality television series starring Ozzy Osbourne and his son Jack Osbourne. The first season, consisting of 10 episodes, premiered on July 24, 2016, on History. A second season of 10 episodes began airing on A&E on November 8, 2017. On January 23, 2018, Jack revealed on his official Instagram page that the series had been picked up for a third season. The eight-episode third season premiered on A&E on June 13, 2018, with Jack's sister Kelly Osbourne joining the cast.

During each episode, the Osbournes, who are interested in history, visit one or more sites to learn about their history from experts and explore unusual or quirky aspects of their background.

== Series overview ==
Season	Episodes	Originally released	
Season	Episodes	First released	Last released
1	10	July 24, 2016	October 2, 2016
2	10	November 8, 2017	January 3, 2018
3	8	June 13, 2018	August 8, 2018

== Episodes ==
=== Season 1 (2016) ===
No. overall	No. in season	Title	Original release date	U.S. viewers (millions)
1	1	"Like Forefathers, Like Sons"	July 24, 2016	0.93
The duo's first outing takes them to Jamestown, Virginia, where they both get fitted for wigs, among other highlights. The trip comes with a few detours, including one to the largest private collection of classic tanks in the U.S. (where Ozzy & Jack get to drive one).
2	2	"Remember the Alamo?"	July 31, 2016	1.26
Stops in Texas include the Alamo (where Ozzy readdresses the hilarious 1982 public urination incident there), NASA's Johnson Space Center (where they test drive the Mars Rover) and the Museum of Funeral History.
3	3	"Father Knows West"	August 7, 2016	1.06
Travels in South Dakota include engaging in a quick-draw shootout, panning for gold, seeing Wild Bill Hickok's grave, touring a Minuteman nuclear missile site, and visits to both Mount Rushmore and the Crazy Horse monument.
4	4	"Unidentified Flying Ozzy"	August 14, 2016	0.78
Ozzy and Jack search for signs of extraterrestrial life on a trip to Roswell, New Mexico; stops include the Petroglyphs National Monument, the UFO Museum and the supposed alien crash site near Area 51.
5	5	"Iron Mountain Men"	August 21, 2016	1.31
Jack plans the "perfect" trip for Ozzy's birthday, which includes a visit to a museum of medical oddities, a penitentiary, a 220-foot-deep underground bunker and a key item from Ozzy's past.
6	6	"Sir Prince of Darkness"	August 28, 2016	1.05
On a trip back to their homeland in the UK, Ozzy wants to see Alan Turing's Nazi code breaking machine, while Jack wants to see "Superhenge" and tries to get Ozzy knighted.
7	7	"The Last Two Samurai"	September 4, 2016	1.00
Ozzy and Jack travel to Japan; stops include visiting a Samurai Master, making a Katana, and getting Jack a tattoo from a Tebori tattoo master.
8	8	"Misters Osbourne Go to Washington"	September 18, 2016	1.02
A trip to Washington, D.C. includes a visit to the FBI Training Academy, meeting local legend "Little Ozzy", a residence that hosted the Beatles, a park with giant concrete heads of the Presidents, and trying to get a tour of the White House.
9	9	"Cuba or Busted"	September 25, 2016	0.87
A trip to Cuba lets Ozzy & Jack see classic autos, Cold War weapons, Ernest Hemingway's residence and the presidential palace. Meanwhile, Jack wants to bring a little bit of Cuba home in his suitcase--namely some hand-rolled Cuban cigars.
10	10	"The Devil Made Me Do It"	October 2, 2016	0.96
The Osbourne men hit Memphis, Tennessee to visit Sun Studios and the infamous location where the devil supposedly made a deal that changed the history of modern music. Plus, an instrument maker's special gift to Ozzy inspires him to make a little of his own music.

=== Season 2 (2017–18) ===
No. overall	No. in season	Title	Original release date	U.S. viewers (millions)
11	1	"Like Father, Like Sun"	November 8, 2017	0.69
The trip starts in Florida, where the guys do some deep-sea fishing and RV shopping in Key West, python hunting in the Everglades and a visit to Trump's "Winter White House" in Mar-a-Lago. They also visit the East Martello Museum in Key West, Florida. They have an audience with Robert the Doll which is supposedly haunted. Jack buys a replica doll from the gift shop, much to Ozzy's dismay.
12	2	"Speed Demons"	November 15, 2017	0.59
The duo's adventures in Georgia include dirt-track driving, touring an Elvis museum & visiting a diddley bow artisan; a side trip to Texas has Ozzy & Jack serving as Honorary Race Drivers at a NASCAR event, where Ozzy forgets the lyrics to the Star Spangled Banner
13	3	"Texas, Bloody Texas"	November 22, 2017	0.60
The RV breaks down in Texas; Ozzy meets with a Texas-Based Black Sabbath cover band; the guys play a very weird game of bingo and discover the Lone Star State's version of CSI.
14	4	"Kentucky Fried Osbournes"	November 29, 2017	0.60
The GMC is replaced by a Mercedes RV; in Kentucky, the guys come across a sperm-donating stallion, visit a medical oddities museum, tour a life-size replica of Noah's Ark, and Jack shows his law enforcement skills as a reserve police officer.
15	5	"Spicy In-Laws"	December 6, 2017	0.73
The Osbournes visit Jack's in-laws in New Orleans, and Ozzy meets one of his friends from his early touring days. The duo then tour a house in the French Quarter that is reportedly one of the most haunted houses in America.
16	6	"Pearls of Wisdom"	December 13, 2017	0.78
Ozzy and Jack take Jack's daughter, Pearl, on an Arizona camping trip, before visiting Ozzy's friend Billy Idol in Las Vegas.
17	7	"Mission to Mars"	December 20, 2017	0.73
The Osbournes visit the Mars Desert Research Station in Utah.
18	8	"Illin' and Chillin'"	December 27, 2017	0.63
Jack and Ozzy tour the Pacific Northwest, while Jack battles the flu. Ozzy blames his son's illness on the Robert replica doll and places it in a microwave. While Jack recuperates, Ozzy makes time by doing the laundry and visiting a coffee shop. After Jacks gets well, father and son spend time using axes to chop wood and knife-throwing practice and getting geoducks from the beach.
19	9	"Blizzard of Oz"	January 3, 2018	0.72
The Osbournes abandon the RV and fly to Juneau, Alaska. They enjoy feeding bald eagles, whale watching, interacting with sled dogs and experiencing a glacier.
20	10	"Aloha, Osbournes"	January 3, 2018	0.64
Ozzy and Jack take their wives, Sharon and Lisa (respectively), to Kona, Hawaii. Ozzy attempts to get rid of the Robert replica doll on the beach.

=== Season 3 (2018) ===
No. overall	No. in season	Title	Original release date	U.S. viewers (millions)
21	1	"Twisted Sister"	June 13, 2018	0.76
Since Ozzy must prepare for his "No More Tours II Tour" and Jack must stay in Los Angeles to await his daughter's birth, Jack asks sister Kelly to accompany their father.
22	2	"Kelly of the Beast"	June 20, 2018	0.65
While keeping in touch with Jack regarding the birth, Ozzy is looking forward to getting away from all the promotional obligations and Kelly is excited to hit the road with her father. They head for Arizona, where they tour Biosphere 2 and bond over a night of facial masks.
23	3	"New Kid on the Block"	June 27, 2018	0.55
Ozzy and Kelly receive a call from Jack that the baby will soon be born. They make the five-hour trek back to Los Angeles to welcome the newest Osbourne, Minnie Theodora.
24	4	"Kelly Makes Three"	July 11, 2018	0.62
Following his baby's birth, Jack returns to traveling with Ozzy and Kelly. In New Mexico, they sample chili milkshakes and learn to make pistachios, and Kelly finds a way to make a profit from the guys' humor.
25	5	"I Am Ice Cream Man"	July 18, 2018	0.76
The Osbournes arrive in Missouri, and Jack and Kelly have agreed to plan each alternate days' activities. Kelly takes them to eat some fresh ice cream, but Jack arranges a mining trip that involves explosives; Ozzy finally rids themselves of the Robert replica doll by blowing it up, much to Jack's disappointment. Both also plan some surprises for Ozzy.
26	6	"Grand Ole Osbournes"	July 25, 2018	0.66
In Nashville, Tennessee, the Osbournes have a drag queen brunch and restyle Ozzy's Madame Tussauds' wax figure. Kelly also plans a musical surprise for Ozzy, followed by a visit to the largest ashram in America.
27	7	"Lizard of Oz"	August 1, 2018	0.72
Ozzy, Jack, and Pearl head to Alabama, where Jack's childhood dream will be fulfilled at Huntsville's Space Camp. Before they can launch into space, Ozzy has a surprise for Jack: a visit with Dave Turner, the "Rock and Roll Redneck".
28	8	"Florida Finale"	August 8, 2018	0.60
In Florida, Jack and Kelly meet with a chocolate sculptor who makes a bust of Ozzy and visit the famed Fountain of Youth to retrieve some magical water; a psychic attempts to remove any bad luck before Ozzy takes the stage at a music festival.
