= Haunted Highway =

American reality television series

- Genre: Documentary; Reality; Paranormal; Mystery
- Starring: Jack Osbourne; Dana Workman; Jael de Pardo; Devin Marble
- Country of origin: United States
- Original language: English
- No. of seasons: 2
- No. of episodes: 12

Production
- Executive producers: John Brenkus; Mickey Stern; Ron Ziskin
- Running time: 46 minutes
- Production companies: BASE Productions; Thunder Road Productions; Realand Productions

Original release
- Network: Syfy
- Release: July 3, 2012 – December 18, 2013

Haunted Highway (originally called Paranormal Highway) is an American paranormal investigation reality television series produced by BASE Productions. It began airing on the Syfy network on July 3, 2012.

The series features two teams of investigators; Jack Osbourne, investigator Dana Workman, and Fact or Faked: Paranormal Files investigators Jael de Pardo and Devin Marble.

On the 5th episode of the series, Osbourne announced that he was diagnosed with multiple sclerosis (MS) and temporarily stepped down as host of the series.

On April 22, 2013, Syfy renewed the show for a six-episode second season which premiered on November 27, 2013.

== Format ==
The two teams drive across America's highways and back roads, investigating cases of various alleged cryptid sightings. During the intro, Osbourne states that he has had an interest in the paranormal since he was a child and that the show takes a unique investigative approach whereby the teams film their own video footage and do not rely on camera crews.

Opening Introductions:

I'm Jack Osbourne and I've been obsessed with the paranormal since I was a kid. I've wanted to investigate some of America's scariest cases. But I decided it had to be done differently. I've put together two teams--myself and my researcher Dana and my friends Jael and Devin. We shot everything ourselves; just us. This is what we discovered and it completely blew my mind.

Premiere episode intro:

Two teams of paranormal investigators out on the road...alone. No camera crew. No backup. Searching for things...that don't want to be found.

Main episode intro:

The following footage was shot entirely by investigators. Two teams of paranormal investigators hunting for the truth behind two terrifying cases...alone. No camera crew. No backup. Searching for things...that don't want to be found.

== Cast ==
- Jack Osbourne - Team Leader
- Dana Workman - Researcher
- Jael de Pardo - Investigator
- Devin Marble - Investigator

== Episodes ==
| Season | Episodes | Originally aired | |
| Season | Episodes | Season premiere | Season finale |
|---|---|---|---|
| 1 | 6 | July 3, 2012 | August 7, 2012 |
| 2 | 6 | November 27, 2013 | December 18, 2013 |

=== Season 1 (2012) ===
| No. overall | No. in season | Title | Original release date |
|---|---|---|---|
| 1 | 1 | "Bear Lake Beast/Vergas Hairy Man" | July 3, 2012 |
In the series premiere, Jack and Dana go to Garden City, Utah, and search Bear Lake, (located at the Utah/Idaho border), for an alleged reptilian lake monster, so-called the "Bear Lake Beast," that is described by eye witnesses to be 20 feet long. Meanwhile, near Vergas, Minnesota, Jael and Devin investigate sightings of an 8-foot tall, 300-pound hairy man said to be lurking in the nearby forests.
| 2 | 2 | "Darkman of Standing Rock/Blackstar Shadow Man" | July 10, 2012 |
Jael and Devin travel to Fort Yates, North Dakota to investigate Standing Rock, the Native American reservation of the Lakota Sioux tribe, and the home of the "Dark Man" legend; an alleged grim reaper-like entity. In the next segment, Jack and Dana search for a shadow being supposedly haunting Black Star Canyon in Orange, California.
| 3 | 3 | "Utah Skinwalker/Ozark Howler" | July 17, 2012 |
Jack and Dana head to the "Devil's Soup Bowl" canyon and "Skinwalker Ridge" in Fort Duchesne, Utah to search for signs of the "Skin-walker," a shape-shifting spirit of Native American legend. Meanwhile, Jael and Devin travel to Jasper, Arkansas to investigate the Ozark Howler, a giant cat-like creature, sometimes called the "Devil Cat," that allegedly prowls Camp Wallpac.
| 4 | 4 | "El Dorado Hellhounds/Georgia Skinstealer" | July 24, 2012 |
Jack and Dana go searching for hellhounds said to guard old gold mines on the land near El Dorado Canyon in Nelson, Nevada. Next, Jael and Devin go through Ebenezer Swamp in Gullah territory in Savannah, Georgia to track down the alleged "Skin Stealer," a flesh-taking entity said to drain the souls of victims during sleep and leaving them incapacitated.
| 5 | 5 | "Louisiana Swamp Woman/Pioneer Cemetery" | July 31, 2012 |
Jael and Devin go hunting for the "Swamp Woman" of Cotile Lake in Alexandria, Louisiana, an alleged victim of a massacre whose screams are said to be heard in swamp. In the next part, they head to Coloma, California to investigate paranormal activity in the 250-year-old pioneer cemetery.
| 6 | 6 | "Silver City Ghost Town/Shunka Warakin" | August 7, 2012 |
Jael and Devin investigate an old west ghost town of Silver City, Idaho that used to be a mining town in the 1800s. The alleged paranormal activity may surround people murdered, or killed in the Idaho Hotel and the Masonic Lodge. Later, they travel to Ennis, Montana to track down a Native American prairie monster called the Shunka Warakin (meaning "carries off dogs"), a canine creature that mutilates livestock in Beaverhead National Forest.

=== Season 2 (2013) ===
| No. overall | No. in season | Title | Original release date |
|---|---|---|---|
| 7 | 1 | "Island of Lost Souls" | November 27, 2013 |
In the second season premiere, Jack and Dana team up with Jael and Devin to investigate poltergeist activity at Fort Jefferson, a ruined Civil War stronghold used by the Union Army as a prison on a small island in the Dry Tortugas 80 miles off of the Florida coast that is a day-long boat ride to get there. One of the prison's infamous inmates was Dr. Samuel Mudd whose cell is said to be the cause of most of the physical attack hauntings.
| 8 | 2 | "Manchac Swamp/Moonville Tunnel" | December 4, 2013 |
Jack and Dana travel to Manchac, Louisiana to investigate the Manchac Swamp which is haunted by the "Woman in White", believed to be voodoo witch Julia Brown who just before she died sang a song of death causing a hurricane to wipe out the town and its townspeople in 1915. Next, Jael and Devin head to McArthur, Ohio to capture evidence of the ghosts of train engineer Frank Lawhead who died in a train collision in 1880 and town bully Baldy Keaten who are both haunting an abandoned train tunnel in the destroyed town of Moonville.
| 9 | 3 | "Beast of Bray Road/Tonopah Mine" | December 10, 2013 |
Jael and Devin travel to Elkhorn, Wisconsin to gather evidence on alleged sightings of the "Beast of Bray Road", said to be a 6-8 foot tall werewolf-like creature that was first reported in 1936. Their search continues in Kettle Moraine State Forest where they follow a deer trail to track the foul-smelling beast. Next, Jack and Dana investigate the old silver ore mining town of Tonopah, Nevada and home of the Tonopah Mine which suffered a major fire named the Bellmont Fire in 1911 and is haunted by the ghost of miners and the ghost of a murderous prostitute called, "Bloody Babs".
| 10 | 4 | "Lake Murray Beast/The Donner Party" | December 11, 2013 |
Jael and Devin travel to Lexington, South Carolina to track down a supposed snake-like "lake monster" that's said to inhabit Lake Murray since it was first spotted in 1933 by some fisherman while fishing near Dreher Island. Meanwhile, Jack and Dana head to Donner Memorial Park in Truckee, California to investigate hauntings that are connected to the infamous Donner Party, one family out of 90 stranded settlers that had to resort to cannibalism in the snow-covered Sierra Mountains in 1846.
| 11 | 5 | "Shades of Death/Bridge of Doom" | December 17, 2013 |
Jael and Devin travel to Ashtabula, Ohio to investigate the Ashtabula Bridge that was the site of one of the most tragic railroad disasters in American history in 1876. They also visit Chestnut Grove Cemetery where the 92 passengers who died in the train crash were buried near the bridge's designer Charles Collins who committed suicide soon after. Next, Jack and Dana head to Belvidere, New Jersey to investigate a stretch of highway called Shades of Death Road that is the home of several local legends including hooded figures and ghost lights. They also visit "Ghost Lake" which is haunted by pillars of mist believed to be the Lenape Native Americans who were massacred by Dutch settlers.
| 12 | 6 | "Black Angel/Arizona Domes" | December 18, 2013 |
Jael and Devin travel to Iowa City, Iowa to investigate the Oakland Cemetery that features a statue called "The Black Angel of Death" which was erected by a woman rumored to have killed her husband and son and it's said to curse those who touch it with failing health. Next, Jack and Dana head to Casa Grande, Arizona to investigate reports of paranormal activity inside a series of dome-shaped abandoned structures known as "The Domes" that's by the Casa Grande National Monument where the Hohokam tribe left without reason after using the land to perform human sacrifices.
