= The Osbournes Want to Believe =

American television series (2020–2021)

- Genre: Reality, Paranormal
- Created by: Jack Osbourne (concept)
- Presented by: Jack Osbourne
- Starring: Ozzy Osbourne; Sharon Osbourne
- Country of origin: United States
- Original language: English
- No. of seasons: 2
- No. of episodes: 28

Production
- Executive producers: Jason Cilo; Elaine White; Ron Simon
- Running time: 42 minutes
- Production company: Meetinghouse Productions

Original release
- Network: Travel Channel; Discovery+; HBO Max
- Release: August 2, 2020 – October 31, 2021

The Osbournes Want to Believe is an American reality television series that premiered on August 2, 2020, on the Travel Channel. The show features Jack Osbourne as he attempts to convince his famously skeptical parents, Ozzy and Sharon Osbourne, of the existence of various paranormal phenomena. Each episode showcases Jack presenting a series of "jaw-dropping" supernatural videos to Ozzy and Sharon, ranging from UFOs, Bigfoot, poltergeists, and haunted dolls, to unexplained apparitions and cryptids. The series highlights the family's unique and often humorous reactions and critiques to the footage, with Jack serving as the "paranormal investigator" and his parents offering their often disbelieving or comical commentary. The show ran for two seasons, totaling 28 episodes, concluding its original broadcast run on October 31, 2021.

== Premise ==
The core concept of The Osbournes Want to Believe centers on Jack Osbourne's personal mission to convert his parents, Ozzy and Sharon, into believers in the supernatural. Jack, who has a well-documented interest and career in paranormal investigation (including hosting shows like Portals to Hell), curates a selection of alleged real-life footage. These videos depict a wide range of inexplicable events and creatures, such as alien encounters, Sasquatch sightings, ghostly interactions, and other unexplained phenomena.

Ozzy and Sharon, both known for their strong personalities and often cynical outlooks, watch these clips alongside Jack from their home. Their reactions form the central entertainment of the series. While Jack earnestly tries to present compelling evidence, his parents frequently offer unfiltered, humorous, and sometimes skeptical commentary, often leading to lively family banter. The show aims to blend elements of paranormal investigation with the established comedic and chaotic family dynamic that made The Osbournes a cultural phenomenon, but with a new thematic focus. The segments often include brief educational moments where Jack explains common paranormal terms or theories to his parents.

== Cast ==
- Ozzy Osbourne (himself): The legendary heavy metal musician, often portrayed as highly skeptical and easily bewildered by the presented phenomena, but always with a characteristic dry wit.
- Sharon Osbourne (herself): The outspoken music manager and television personality, who shares Ozzy's skepticism but often adds sharp, humorous remarks and observations.
- Jack Osbourne (himself): The show's host and the driving force behind the investigations. A seasoned paranormal enthusiast, he is dedicated to convincing his parents with various video evidence.

== Episodes ==
The series consists of two seasons, totaling 28 episodes.

=== Season 1 (2020) ===
The first season premiered on August 2, 2020, and featured 8 episodes.

List of The Osbournes Want to Believe episodes
No. overall	No. in season	Title	Original air date	Short summary
1	1	Believer	August 2, 2020	Jack shares video evidence of poltergeists, haunted dolls, and unidentifiable beasts, hoping to convert his skeptical parents.
2	2	Breaking All the Rules	August 9, 2020	Features clips of UFOs, aggressive poltergeist activity, and a humanoid creature that defies physics. Jack educates Ozzy and Sharon on Aswangs.
3	3	Fairies Wear Boots	August 16, 2020	The Osbournes debate the existence of fairies and lizard people, and whether soldier spirits can inhabit dolls or ghosts can do math.
4	4	Back On Earth	August 23, 2020	Undeniably odd videos of UFOs, giant cryptids, and curious ghosts lead Ozzy to believe his own house might be haunted.
5	5	Crazy Babies	August 30, 2020	Jack presents video evidence of alleged alien abductions and other bizarre phenomena.
6	6	Bark at the Moon	September 6, 2020	Ozzy and Sharon are stunned by footage of UFO armies on the moon and engage in a discussion about souls.
7	7	See You On the Other Side	September 13, 2020	Jack challenges his parents' perception of reality with footage of a levitating girl.
8	8	Now You See It (Now You Don't)	September 20, 2020	Jack reveals shocking footage including a real-life vampire, mysterious crop circles, and a purported Jesus Christ sighting.

=== Season 2 (2021) ===
The second season premiered on August 22, 2021, and featured 20 episodes.

List of The Osbournes Want to Believe episodes
No. overall	No. in season	Title	Original air date	Short summary
9	1	Lost in Space	August 22, 2021	The Osbournes examine footage related to the 1969 moon landing, dusting off their tinfoil hats.
10	2	Great Balls of Fire	August 29, 2021	A UFO sighting strikes too close to home for the Osbournes' comfort; the family ponders alien pets.
11	3	The Osbournes Live Again	September 5, 2021	Eerie evidence leaves the family contemplating the possibilities of time travel and the dangers of playing with spirits.
12	4	Ground Control to Major Oz	September 12, 2021	The Osbournes are baffled by undeniable proof of alleged extraterrestrial activity; Jack shares footage of a ghost that speaks English.
13	5	Playing With Dolls	September 19, 2021	Jack attempts to convince Ozzy and Sharon with video evidence of haunted dolls, while a Bigfoot sighting leaves them baffled.
14	6	Dead Man's Party	September 26, 2021	The Osbournes witness a bone-chilling exorcism, then contemplate a zombie apocalypse; Jack has an announcement.
15	7	Something Wicked This Way Comes	October 3, 2021	Jack presents his parents with Bigfoot sightings and an aggressive poltergeist; Ozzy and Sharon debate the existence of an alien species.
16	8	Spooky and the Beast	October 10, 2021	The family watches footage of a mythical creature and a ghostly figure; Ozzy reveals his own strange encounter.
17	9	Night of the Cryptids	October 17, 2021	Jack shows his parents a compilation of Bigfoot sightings and a mythical beast that brings them to the brink of belief.
18	10	Zombie Stomp	October 17, 2021	The Osbournes watch footage of an alleged zombie, the elusive Ohio Grassman, and even the devil himself.
19	11	The Exorcism of Ozzy	October 24, 2021	Jack puts the paranormal to the test, and the Osbournes decide which cryptid is the scariest.
20	12	Today Is the End	October 31, 2021	The Osbournes get chills watching ghostly photo-bombs, a mutant shark, and an ominous fleet of UFOs; Jack attempts to convince his parents that lizard people are real.
21	13	The Uninvited Guest	October 31, 2021	Jack tries to convince his parents that haunted houses are real; the Osbournes decide if a ghost can haunt a human.
22	14	Attack of the Space Bugs	October 31, 2021	The Osbournes get a real shock when Jack shows them footage of alleged alien space bugs; a sea monster makes them question reality.
23	15	Demon Possession	October 31, 2021	Jack presents his parents with compelling evidence of demon possession and a real-life gargoyle.
24	16	Ghost Hunters and Seekers	October 31, 2021	The Osbournes watch footage of Bigfoot, UFOs, and a ghostly figure; Jack gives his parents a new look at paranormal phenomena.
25	17	The Night the Lights Went Out	October 31, 2021	The Osbournes watch footage of ghostly figures and UFOs; Jack gives his parents a new look at paranormal phenomena.
26	18	Close Encounters of the Ozzy Kind	October 31, 2021	Jack shows his parents footage of alleged alien encounters and a sea monster; the Osbournes debate the existence of an alien species.
27	19	The Oz-Men	October 31, 2021	The Osbournes watch footage of mythical creatures and a ghostly figure; Jack gives his parents a new look at paranormal phenomena.
28	20	The Blair Witch Project	October 31, 2021	Jack shows his parents footage of alleged alien encounters and a sea monster; the Osbournes debate the existence of an alien species.

== Production ==
The Osbournes Want to Believe was greenlit by the Travel Channel, with the concept originating from Jack Osbourne, building on his established interest in paranormal investigation. The series is produced by Meetinghouse Productions. Jason Cilo, Elaine White, and Ron Simon serve as executive producers for the show.

The production style of the series is characterized by its intimate, home-based setting, largely filmed within the Osbourne family's residence. This approach allows for authentic and unscripted reactions from Ozzy and Sharon as they watch the presented footage. The show leverages advanced visual effects and graphic overlays to enhance the presented video evidence for viewer clarity.

== Release ==
The series premiered on the Travel Channel on August 2, 2020. Following its initial broadcast, episodes became available on various streaming platforms, including Discovery+, HBO Max, Amazon Prime Video, Apple TV, Philo, and Sling TV. The show completed its two-season run on October 31, 2021, with its final original broadcast.

== Reception ==
While The Osbournes Want to Believe did not receive extensive critical analysis from major media outlets, it was generally received by audiences as a lighthearted and entertaining addition to the paranormal reality genre. Viewers appreciated the unique family dynamic of the Osbournes, particularly the comedic interplay between Jack's earnest attempts to convince his parents and Ozzy and Sharon's often disbelieving, yet always candid, reactions. The show capitalized on the enduring appeal of the Osbourne family, offering fans a new format to experience their signature banter and irreverence. Some viewer discussions online indicate mixed reception, with some finding the premise engaging and humorous, while others perceived Ozzy and Sharon's skepticism as occasionally disengaged or the presented footage as unconvincing. However, its overall tone is generally seen as more comedic and less serious than traditional paranormal investigation shows.

== See also ==
- The Osbournes - The original reality television series starring the Osbourne family.
- Portals to Hell - Another paranormal investigation series hosted by Jack Osbourne.
