= Shut up (disambiguation) =

Shut up is a phrase meaning "be quiet".

Shut Up may also refer to:

- Shut Up (LaFee album), 2008
- Shut Up (Kelly Osbourne album), 2002
- "Shut Up" (The Black Eyed Peas song), 2003
- "Shut Up" (LaFee song), 2008
- "Shut Up" (Madness song), 1981
- Shut Up (Nettspend song), 2024
- "Shut Up" (Kelly Osbourne song), 2002
- "Shut Up" (R. Kelly song), 2011
- "Shut Up!" (Simple Plan song), 2005
- "Shut Up" (Stormzy song), 2015
- "Shut Up" (Trick Daddy song), 1999
- "Shut Up" (Unnies song), 2016
- "Shut Up", a song by Christina Aguilera from Lotus, 2012
- "Shut Up", a song by Blink-182 from Take Off Your Pants & Jacket, 2001
- "Shut Up", a song by The Bloodhound Gang from One Fierce Beer Coaster, 1996
- "Shut Up", a song by Ariana Grande from Positions, 2020
- "Shut Up", a song by Nick Lachey from SoulO, 2003
- "Shut Up", a song by Lush
- "Shut Up", a song by The Stranglers, b-side to Nice 'n' Sleazy, 1978
- "Shut Up", a song by Vixen from Tangerine, 1998
- "Shut Up", a song by Joe Walsh from Songs for a Dying Planet, 1992
- "Shut Up (and Sleep with Me)", a 1995 song by Sin with Sebastian
- "Shut Up!!" (시끄러!!), a song by U-KISS from the EP Break Time, 2010
- "Shut Up – The Footy's on the Radio", a 1987 song by TISM
- Shut Up, a 2023 Japanese television series starring Miho Watanabe

== See also ==
- ¿Por qué no te callas?, a phrase uttered by King Juan Carlos I of Spain (translated as "Why don't you shut up?")
- Ruby & Quentin or Tais-toi! (literally "shut up!" in French), a 2003 film
- Shut Your Mouth (disambiguation)
- "Shut It", a 1996 song by The Damned
- Shut the fuck up (disambiguation)
- Shut Up and Dance (disambiguation)
- STFU (disambiguation)
