= STFU =

STFU may refer to:

- "Shut the fuck up", an expletive

== Music ==
- "STFU", a song by A$AP Rocky from the 2026 album Don't Be Dumb
- "STFU", a 2022 song by Neck Deep
- "STFU!", a 2019 song by Rina Sawayama
- "STFU", a 2014 song by Kim Petras
- "STFU", a 2019 song by Julie Bergan
- "STFU", a song by Pink Guy from the 2017 album Pink Season
- "STFU", a song by Rico Nasty from the 2020 album Nightmare Vacation
- "STFU", a song by Lizzo featuring Lil Jon from the 2025 mixtape My Face Hurts from Smiling

== Other uses ==
- Southern Tenant Farmers Union, a civil farmer's union (1934–1970)
- Southern Tenant Folk Union, a musical band

== See also ==
- Shut up (disambiguation)
- Shut the fuck up (disambiguation)
