= Shut the fuck up (disambiguation) =

Shut the fuck up is an expletive form of "shut up".

Shut the fuck up may also refer to:

- "Shut the Fuck Up", a song by Basshunter
- Shut the Fuck Up Tour, also known as the Ghost of Tom Joad Tour, featuring Bruce Springsteen
- "Shut the fuck up, TERF," an internet meme featuring fictional character Lily Hoshikawa
- "Shut the Fuck Up", a 1984 video by artist group General Idea.

== See also ==
- Shut up (disambiguation)
- STFU (disambiguation)
