= Changes (Black Sabbath song) =

1972 song by Black Sabbath

Song by Black Sabbath

from the album Vol. 4
- Released: September 1972
- Recorded: 1972
- Genre: Soft rock
- Length: 4:43
- Label: Vertigo (UK) Warner Bros. (US)
- Songwriters: Ozzy Osbourne; Tony Iommi; Geezer Butler; Bill Ward
- Producers: Patrick Meehan; Black Sabbath

"Changes" is a song by English heavy metal band Black Sabbath. A ballad, it first appeared on Vol. 4, which was released in 1972. In 1993, Ozzy Osbourne released a live version as a single from the Live & Loud album. In 2003, a version with his daughter, Kelly Osbourne was released as a single.

== Overview ==
The song's piano melody was composed by guitarist Tony Iommi, who was experimenting with the instrument in the studio. The lyrics were by bassist Geezer Butler, and vocalist Ozzy Osbourne has referred to the song as "heartbreaking". Quite different from Sabbath's previous work, the song was described as a "forlornly pretty" ballad by critic Barney Hoskyns. It was inspired mainly by drummer Bill Ward's break-up with his first wife.

Notably, "Changes" was not recorded with a real string ensemble. Instead, Geezer Butler and Tony Iommi used a Mellotron to create the sound of an orchestra. The ballad is generally an outlier in the band's discography as it does not feature guitar or drums. To alleviate concerns about the band departing their well-known heavy sound, Osbourne promised in a 1972 interview "We're certainly not going to get any less heavy, we will probably do 'Changes' on stage with a Mellotron, but we'll never take strings on stage with us or anything like that."

The band first performed the song live in 1973.

== Personnel (original version) ==
- Ozzy Osbourne – vocals
- Tony Iommi – piano, Mellotron
- Geezer Butler – bass guitar, Mellotron

== Charts ==
Chart performance for "Changes"
Chart (2025)	Peak position
Sweden Heatseeker (Sverigetopplistan)	11

== Cover versions ==
=== Ozzy and Kelly Osbourne version ===
"Changes"

Single by Ozzy and Kelly Osbourne

from the album Changes
- Released: 8 December 2003
- Length: 4:07
- Label: Sanctuary
- Songwriters: Ozzy Osbourne; Tony Iommi; Geezer Butler; Bill Ward
- Producer: Mark Hudson

Ozzy Osbourne singles chronology
"Stillborn" (2003)	"Changes" (2003)	"In My Life" (2005)

Kelly Osbourne singles chronology
"Shut Up" (2003)	"Changes" (2003)	"One Word" (2005)

Three decades later, Ozzy recorded another version of the song, this time with his daughter, Kelly Osbourne as a duet. The revised lyrics for this version, released on 8 December 2003, reflect the moments of their life together. Ozzy said Kelly wanted a song about her after he made songs about her siblings on Ozzmosis—"Aimee" about Aimee Osbourne and "My Little Man" about Jack Osbourne—and so he decided to help her career re-recording "one of my favourite songs of all time". The single reached number one on the UK Singles Chart, becoming the second father-daughter duet to top the chart after Frank and Nancy Sinatra did so with "Somethin' Stupid" in 1967. "Changes" also reached the top 20 in Germany, Ireland, and Norway.

According to the Ozzy Osbourne official website, the single sold over one million copies. Maura Johnston of The Village Voice ranked the song at number 27 on her list of the "50 Worst Songs of the '00s".

Following Ozzy Osbourne's death in July 2025, the song debuted at number eight on the UK Singles Downloads Chart, peaking at number seven, one week later.

==== Track listings ====
- UK CD1
1. "Changes" – 4:07
2. "Changes" (Felix da Housecat's dance mix) – 6:11
3. "Come Dig Me Out" (live) – 3:54
- UK CD2
1. "Changes" – 4:07
2. "Changes" (Who's the Daddy dub mix) – 5:41
3. "Changes" (enhanced video) – 4:07

==== Charts ====
===== Weekly charts =====
Chart (2003–2004)	Peak position
Austria (Ö3 Austria Top 40)	31
Europe (Eurochart Hot 100)	4
Germany (GfK)	15
Ireland (IRMA)	7
Norway (VG-lista)	15
Scottish Singles Sales (Official Charts)	1
Sweden (Sverigetopplistan)	26
UK Singles (Official Charts)	1
UK Independent (Official Charts)	1
UK Rock & Metal (Official Charts)	2
US Dance Club Songs (Billboard) Felix da Housecat Remix	31

Chart (2025)	Peak position
UK Singles Downloads (Official Charts)	7

===== Year-end charts =====
Chart (2003)	Position
Ireland (IRMA)	82
UK Singles (OCC)	7

Chart (2004)	Position
UK Singles (OCC)	35

==== Certifications ====
Region	Certification	Certified units/sales
United Kingdom (BPI)	Gold	400,000^{^}
^{^} Shipments figures based on certification alone.

==== Release history ====
Region	Date	Format(s)	Label(s)	Ref(s).
United Kingdom	8 December 2003	CD	Sanctuary	
United States	19 January 2004	Contemporary hit; hot adult contemporary radio	Sanctuary	

=== Back to the Beginning version ===
"Changes"

Single by Yungblud, Nuno Bettencourt, and Frank Bello featuring Adam Wakeman and II
- Released: 18 July 2025
- Recorded: 5 July 2025
- Venue: Villa Park (Birmingham)
- Length: 5:40
- Label: Capitol
- Songwriters: Ozzy Osbourne; Tony Iommi; Geezer Butler; Bill Ward
- Producer: Matt Schwartz

Yungblud singles chronology
"Zombie" (2025)	"Changes" (2025)	"My Only Angel" (2025)

Music video
- "Changes" (Live From Villa Park / Back To The Beginning) on YouTube

A live recording of Yungblud's performance of the song from the Back to the Beginning concert was released as a charity single on 18 July 2025, featuring Frank Bello on bass, Nuno Bettencourt on guitar, Sleep Token II on drums, and Adam Wakeman on keyboards.

Rhys Buchanan of Rolling Stone said Yungblud's performance at the 5 July 2025 benefit concert, which he dedicated to Diogo Jota, "stopped the stadium in its tracks".

Following Ozzy Osbourne's death in July 2025, the song debuted at number 1 on the UK Singles Downloads Chart. All proceeds will go to benefit Acorns Children's Hospice, Birmingham Children's Hospital and Cure Parkinson's.

This version won the Grammy Award for Best Rock Performance at the 68th Annual Grammy Awards.

==== Charts ====
Weekly chart performance for "Changes"
Chart (2025)	Peak position
New Zealand Hot Singles (RMNZ)	17
UK Singles (Official Charts)	90
US Hot Rock & Alternative Songs (Billboard)	42

=== Charles Bradley version ===
Charles Bradley recorded a cover of the song in a soul music style. It was first released as a Record Store Day Black Friday single in 2013, and would later be released as the title track of Bradley's 2016 album Changes.

The following year, Bradley's cover received increased exposure when it was used as the theme song to the Netflix-produced adult animated sitcom Big Mouth. The series' cast members Maya Rudolph and Jordan Peele also performed a version of the song for the series' soundtrack in character as Connie the Hormone Monstress and the Ghost of Duke Ellington, respectively.

Charles Bradley's version of the song is featured in the 5th episode of the 4th season of the show Black-ish and the end credits for the 2nd episode of the 6th season of Suits.

Bradley's version of the song also appeared in an episode of the HBO series Big Little Lies, and was featured on the soundtrack album of the show's second season.

This version saw further use in an April 2022 promo for Turner Classic Movies.

=== Other uses ===
- Jazz Sabbath, the jazz trio led by Adam Wakeman, recorded an instrumental jazz version of the song on their 2020 self-titled album.
- Country musician Billy Walker recorded a version of the song on his 1973 album The Hand of Love.
- Eminem sampled "Changes" on "Going Through Changes", a track on his 2010 album Recovery.
- Country band 49 Winchester released a cover of the song as a single on November 7, 2025.
- Susanna recorded a version of the song on the 2008 album Flower of Evil.
