= Embassy of Spain, Caracas =

Embassy of Spain, Caracas Embajada de España en Venezuela
- Location: Caracas, Venezuela
- Address: 4ª Avenida, entre 3ª y 4ª Transversal, Torre España, Altamira, Caracas 1060
- Coordinates: 10°30′2″N 66°51′5″W
- Ambassador: Ramón Santos
- Website: www.exteriores.gob.es/Embajadas/caracas

The Embassy of Spain, Caracas (Spanish: Embajada de España en Venezuela) is the official diplomatic mission of Spain in Venezuela.

== History ==
In 1846, Spain and Venezuela officially established relations.

On 4 August 2017, the day that the Maduro-backed Constituent National Assembly was established, there were explosive devices that detonated near the Spanish embassy building.

=== Refuge for Venezuelan opposition ===
The Spanish embassy has served as a refuge destination for Venezuelan opposition figures facing repression from the Venezuelan government. In April 2019, the embassy extended protection to opposition leader Leopoldo López after he faced arrest for calling on a rebellion to unseat Nicolas Maduro. Similarly, opposition figure Edmundo González sought refuge in the embassy in 2024 following the disputed results from the presidential election and the resulting political crisis, as he faced arrest from the Maduro regime for claiming to have won the election.

== Ambassador ==
In 2022, Spanish prime minister Pedro Sánchez appointed Ramón Santos as ambassador to Venezuela.

== See also ==
- Spain–Venezuela relations
- Embassy of Venezuela, Madrid
- List of diplomatic missions of Spain
- List of diplomatic missions in Venezuela
