= Shut Your Mouth =

Shut Your Mouth may refer to:

- Shut Your Mouth (album), a 2000 album by Frenzal Rhomb
- "Shut Your Mouth" (song), a 2001 song by Garbage
- "Shut Your Mouth", a song by Attack Attack! from the 2010 album Attack Attack!
- "Shut Your Mouth", a song by Made in London
- "Shut Your Mouth", a song by Motörhead from the 2002 album Hammered
- "Shut Your Mouth", a song by Pain from the 2002 album Nothing Remains the Same
- Shut Yo' Mouth!, a 1981 album by jazz bassist Slam Stewart

== See also ==
- Shut Your Mouth and Open Your Eyes, a 1998 album by AFI
- Shut up
- World Shut Your Mouth (disambiguation)
- WWE SmackDown! Shut Your Mouth, a 2002 professional wrestling video game
