= Guiana Brasileira (meme) =

Internet meme

Brazil (in green) was a colony of Portugal (in yellow) for three centuries.

"Guiana Brasileira" (lit. 'Brazilian Guiana') is an Internet meme that emerged on social media in 2025, satirizing Portugal as if it were an extension of Brazil. The joke began after a controversy involving the signing of Portuguese player Kika Nazareth by Barcelona's women's team, which was announced with the Brazilian expression Fala galera! (lit. 'Hey, folks!'). This sparked criticism from Portuguese users, who considered the expression inappropriate and "too Brazilian". In response, Brazilian internet users distorted the term "Guiana Brasileira" to refer to Portugal, playfully suggesting a Brazilian colonization of the European country. Originally, Guiana brasileira refers to the Brazilian portion of the Guiana Shield, which comprises part of the states of Amazonas, Amapá, Pará, and Roraima; until 1823, this region, known as Portuguese Guiana, belonged to the State of Grão-Pará and Rio Negro, which was separate from the State and Kingdom of Brazil.

== Origin ==
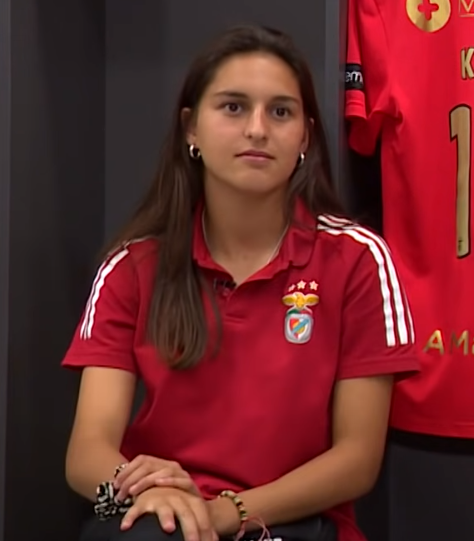
Kika Nazareth in 2021

The meme began in November 2024, when Barcelona announced the signing of Kika Nazareth with the greeting "Fala, galera!" (lit. 'Hey, folks!'), a phrase that is typically Brazilian. Following this, many Portuguese fans expressed their dissatisfaction, accusing Barcelona of "Brazilianism" and of disrespecting European Portuguese. adding to the growing concerns in Portugal over the influence of Brazilian Portuguese, especially through YouTubers watched by children. and fuelling Anti-Brazilian sentiment in Portugal. In January 2024, a Portuguese anti-immigration page on X went viral after criticizing the use of Brazilian Portuguese on traffic signs in Sintra, in the Lisbon region. The post sparked controversy by accusing Brazilian expressions of undermining European Portuguese. The negative reaction from some Portuguese users led Brazilians to coin the term "Guiana Brasileira" (lit. 'Brazilian Guiana'), referencing French Guiana, a French overseas department in South America. The joke quickly spread across social media, especially on TikTok, X (formerly Twitter), and Instagram.

Another point of contention is the Portuguese-Language Orthographic Agreement of 1990, which aimed to unify spelling across Portuguese-speaking countries. Although implemented in Portugal over a decade ago, the agreement remains controversial. In 2025, a new working group was created to "refine" the agreement, citing ambiguities, flaws, and omissions in its current form.

== Development ==
As the meme gained popularity, various nicknames and playful variations for Portugal emerged, such as "Pernambuco em Pé" (lit. 'Pernambuco standing upright', alluding to the territorial shape of Pernambuco and Portugal), "Mato Grosso do Norte" (lit. 'Northern Mato Grosso', given the existence of the two Brazilian states of Mato Grosso and Mato Grosso do Sul), "Faixa de Gajos" (lit. 'Guys' Strip', a pun on Faixa de Gaza, meaning the Gaza Strip), "Rio Grande de Fora" (lit. 'Outer Rio Grande', given the existence of the two Brazilian states of Rio Grande do Norte and Rio Grande do Sul), and "Porto de Gajinhas" (lit. 'Little Girls' Port', a pun intended on the municipality of Porto de Galinhas), among others, all referencing Brazilian states or cultural elements. Lisbon was humorously renamed "Vitória da Reconquista" (lit. 'Victory of the Reconquest', in reference to the city of Vitória da Conquista), and other cities were also given satirical names, like "Ouro Roubado" (lit. 'Stolen Gold'; a nod to Ouro Preto) and "Raparigas Gerais" (lit. 'General Girls'; playing on the name Minas Gerais, the term Minas as slang for young women, and the fact that "rapariga", which also means young in Portugal, has a negative connotation in Brazil). Users also created fictional flags, currencies, anthems, and mottos, such as "Ordem e Bacalhau" (lit. 'Order and Codfish'; a play on Brazil's motto "Order and Progress"), as well as maps showing Portugal integrated into Brazilian territory. AI-generated videos depicted Portuguese public figures, like Cristiano Ronaldo, "running" for the office of governor of the supposed 27th Brazilian state.

The meme also pokes fun at the large number of Brazilians currently living in Portugal, as well as the historical ties between the two countries. The jokes extend beyond geography and demographics—many users claimed that Brazil would now speak "Brazilian", while Portugal would be relegated to speaking "archaic Brazilian" or "prehistoric Brazilian". Additionally, the old accusation that "Portugal stole Brazil's gold" resurfaced in the humor.

The joke even made its way onto Google Maps, where users created a location entry that allowed people to find Portugal by searching for "Guiana Brasileira". It also appeared on Wikipedia, where users created fictitious pages about "Guiana Brasileira", and edited various articles to rename Portugal accordingly, even inventing a supposed "historic agreement" for the annexation of Portugal. These edits remained live for a few minutes to several hours. A satirical website was also created to promote the country as a tourist destination under the name "Guiana Brasileira".

== Reception ==
The reaction to the meme was mixed. While many Brazilians saw it as harmless fun, a number of Portuguese users expressed dissatisfaction, calling it disrespectful, offensive, and "cringe-inducing". Portuguese influencer Nokas went viral by posting videos questioning the name "Guiana Brasileira", and quickly gained tens of thousands of new followers.

== See also ==
- URSAL
- ¿Por qué no te callas?
- Královec Region
