= Spain–Venezuela relations =

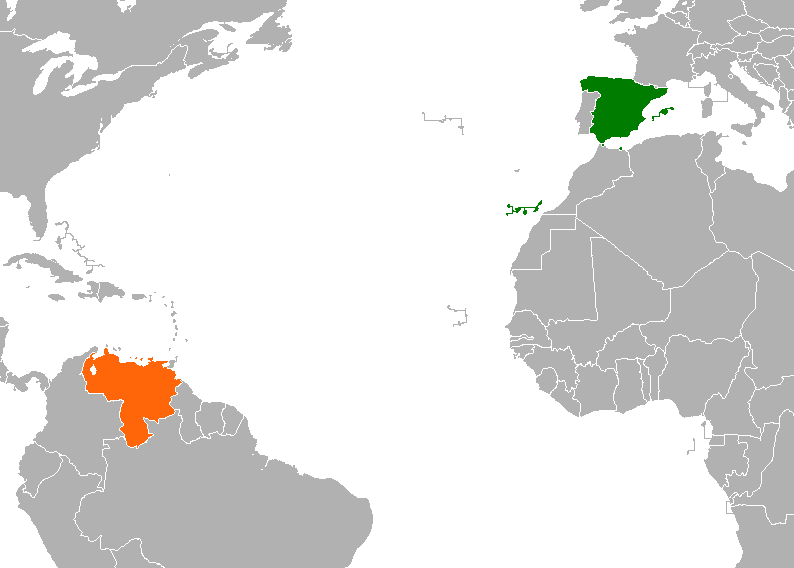
- Spain: Venezuela

Diplomatic mission
- Spanish embassy, Caracas: Venezuelan embassy, Madrid

The Kingdom of Spain and the Bolivarian Republic of Venezuela maintain bilateral relations. They also interact through multinational venues, as both nations are members of the Association of Spanish Language Academies and the Organization of Ibero-American States.

== History ==
=== Colonial times ===
A Spanish expedition led by Alonso de Ojeda, while sailing along the length of the northern coast of South America in 1499, gave the name Venezuela ("little Venice" in Spanish) to the Gulf of Venezuela, because of its imagined similarity to the famed Italian city.

Spain's colonization of mainland Venezuela started in 1522. Spain established its first permanent South American settlement in the present-day city of Cumaná. When Spanish colonists began to arrive, indigenous people lived mainly in groups as agriculturists and hunters: along the coast, in the Andean mountain range, and along the Orinoco River. In 1527, Santa Ana de Coro was founded by Juan de Ampíes, the first governor of the Spanish Empire's Venezuela Province. Coro would be the Province's capital until 1546 followed by El Tocuyo (1546–1577), until the capital was moved to Caracas in 1577 by Juan de Pimentel.

Klein-Venedig (Little Venice) was the most significant part of the German colonization of the Americas, from 1528 to 1546, in which the Augsburg-based Welser banking family obtained colonial rights in Venezuela Province in return for debts owed by Charles I of Spain. The primary motivation was the search for the legendary golden city of El Dorado. The venture was initially led by Ambrosius Ehinger, who founded Maracaibo in 1529. After the deaths of first Ehinger (1533) and then his successor Nikolaus Federmann, Georg von Speyer (1540), Philipp von Hutten continued exploration in the interior, and in his absence from the capital of the province the crown of Spain claimed the right to appoint the governor. On Hutten's return to the capital, Santa Ana de Coro, in 1546, the Spanish governor Juan de Carvajal had Hutten and Bartholomeus VI Welser executed, and Charles subsequently revoked Welser's charter.

=== Independence ===
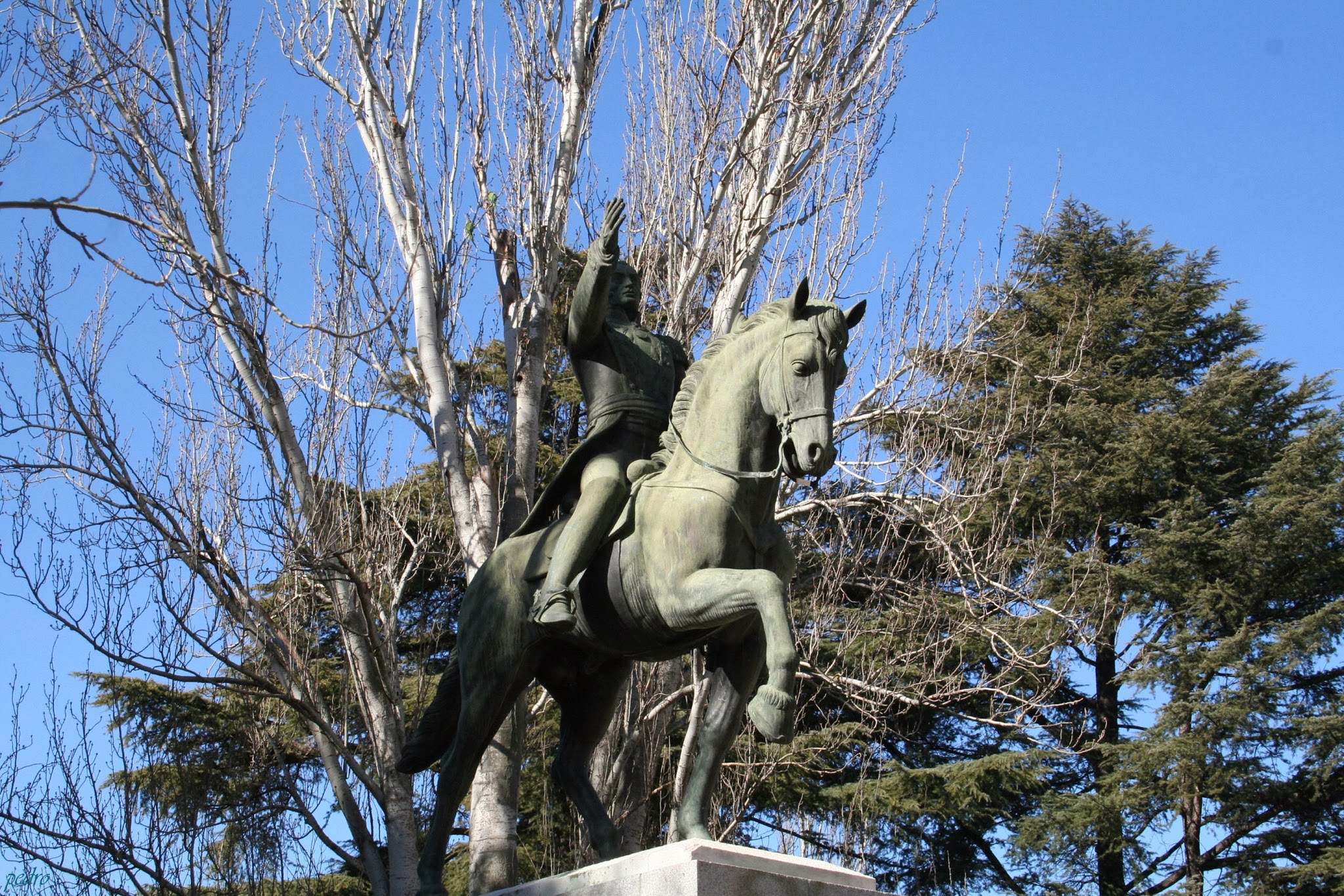
Statue of Simón Bolívar in Madrid

News of Spanish losses in the 1808 Napoleonic Wars soon reached Latin America, but only on 19 April 1810 did the "cabildo" (city council) of Caracas decide to follow the example set by the Spanish provinces two years earlier. On 5 July 1811, seven of the ten provinces of the Captaincy General of Venezuela declared their independence in the Venezuelan Declaration of Independence. The First Republic of Venezuela was lost in 1812 following the 1812 Caracas earthquake and the Battle of La Victoria (1812). Simón Bolívar led an "Admirable Campaign" to retake Venezuela, establishing the Second Republic of Venezuela in 1813, but this did not last long either, falling to a combination of a local uprising and Spanish royalist reconquest.

In December 1819, the Congress of Angostura declared Gran Colombia an independent country. After two more years of war, which killed half of Venezuela's white population, the country achieved independence from Spain in 1821 under the leadership of Simón Bolívar. Bolívar's campaign to liberate New Granada from 1819 to 1820 enabled Venezuela to achieve a lasting independence from Spain. Venezuela, along with the modern-day Colombia, Panama, and Ecuador, formed part of the Republic of Gran Colombia until 1830, when Venezuela separated and became a separate sovereign country.

=== Post independence ===
Spain and Venezuela established diplomatic relations in 1846 after the signing of a Treaty of Peace and Friendship. During the Spanish Civil War (1936–1939), Venezuela, under President Eleazar López Contreras maintained diplomatic relations with General Francisco Franco. From 1946–1958, Venezuela was the second biggest recipient of Spanish migrants (after Argentina) with over 45,000 Spanish migrants arriving to the country.

In October 1976, Spain King Juan Carlos I paid an official visit to Venezuela (his first of four visits). In February 1999, Hugo Chávez became President of Venezuela. Relations between Spain and Venezuela reached its low during President Chávez's time in power. In March 2010, Spain Prime Minister José María Aznar accused the Venezuelan government of supporting, aiding and harboring members of the Spanish terrorist group ETA (Euskadi Ta Askatasuna). In November 2007, during the Ibero-American Summit in Santiago, Chile, while President Chávez was accusing former Spanish Prime Minister Aznar of being a “fascist", Spanish King Juan Carlos I spoke out to President Chávez and in Spanish said ¿Por qué no te callas? (in English: "Why don't you shut up?"). Relations between both nations improved slightly under the government of Mariano Rajoy. In March 2013, Chávez died and Spanish Crown Prince Felipe attended his funeral on behalf of the Spanish government.

Under the Presidency of Nicolás Maduro, relations between Spain and Venezuela are once again at a low point. In February 2017, Prime Minister Rajoy summoned the Venezuelan ambassador in Madrid after President Maduro insulted the Prime Minister after he requested that Venezuela should free the opposition leader Leopoldo López. In January 2018, the Venezuelan government expelled the Spanish ambassador accusing him of interfering in the internal affairs of Venezuela.

On 26 January 2019, in the context of the Venezuelan presidential crisis, the Spanish premier Pedro Sánchez asked Nicolás Maduro for the calling of an election within a 8-day deadline. Shall Maduro not do it, Sánchez announced that the Spanish Government would recognise Juan Guaidó as the (Venezuelan) President. In January 2019, Spain was so the first leading EU country to recognize Venezuelan opposition leader Juan Guaido as interim president.

In January 2026, the Spanish government strongly condemned the United States intervention in Venezuela and the removal of President Nicolás Maduro from the country. In September 2026, Venezuelan acting President Delcy Rodríguez met with Prime Minister Pedro Sánchez while both were attending the Eighty-first session of the United Nations General Assembly in New York City. In November 2026, Venezuelan Foreign Minister Oliver Blanco attended the Ibero-American Summit in Madrid.

== High-level visits ==
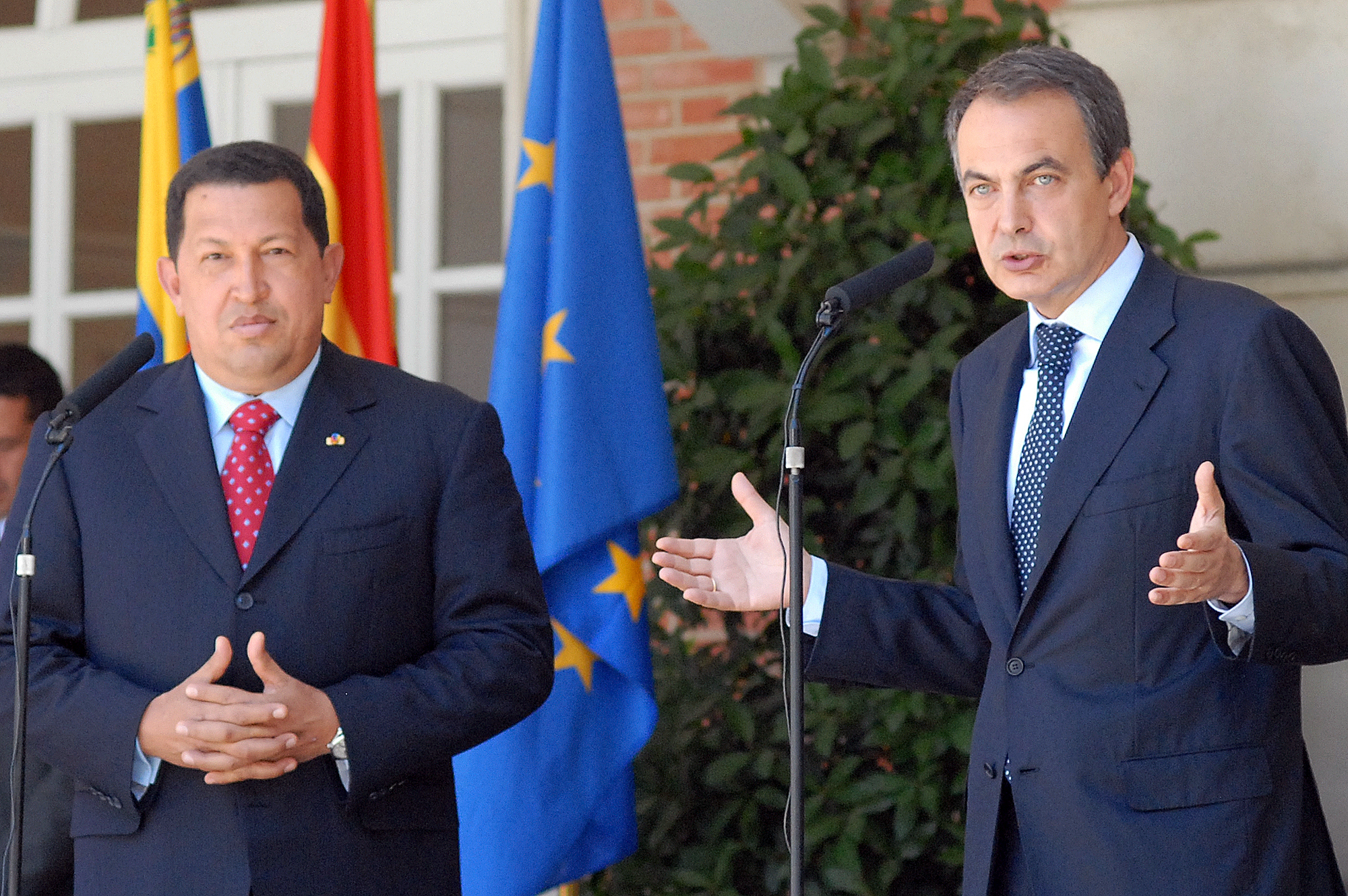
Spanish Prime Minister José Luis Rodríguez Zapatero and Venezuelan President Hugo Chávez in Madrid; 2008.

Royal and Prime Ministerial visits from Spain to Venezuela

- Prince Ferdinand of Bavaria (1921)
- King Juan Carlos I (1976, 1977, 1991, 1997)
- Prime Minister Adolfo Suárez (1978)
- Prime Minister Felipe González (1989)
- Prime Minister José María Aznar (1997)
- Prime Minister José Luis Rodríguez Zapatero (2005)

Presidential visits from Venezuela to Spain

- President Carlos Andrés Pérez (1976, 1990, 1992)
- President Jaime Lusinchi (1986)
- President Rafael Caldera (1996)
- President Hugo Chávez (1999, 2004, 2005, 2008, 2009)

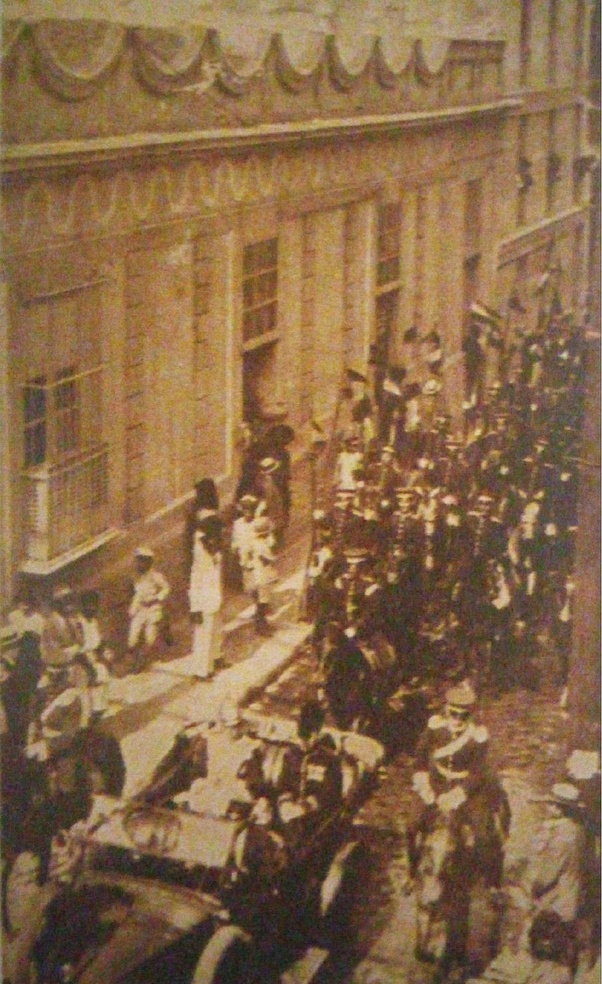
Prince Ferdinand of Bavaria in Caracas; 1921.

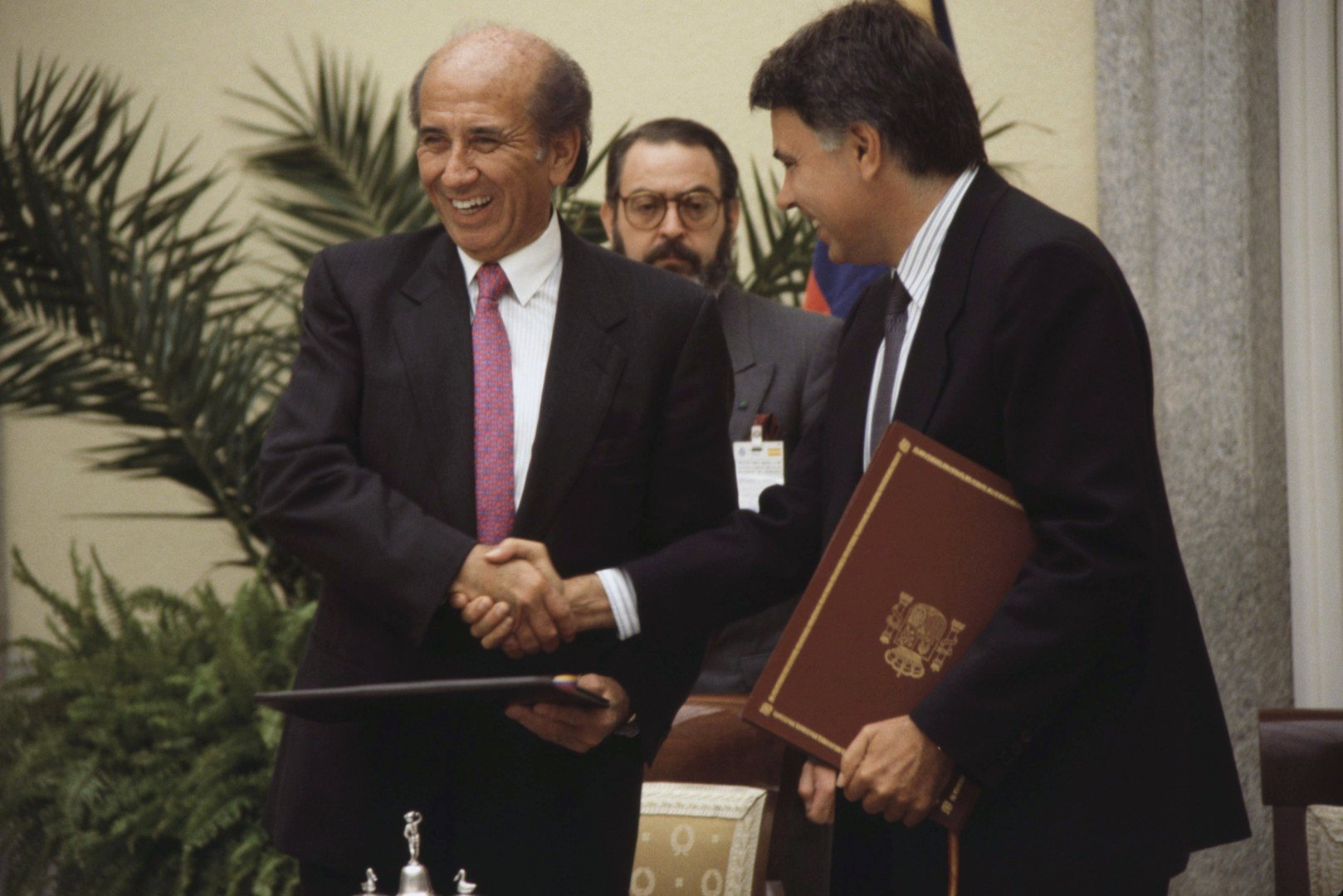
President Carlos Andrés Pérez and Prime Minister Felipe González in Madrid; 1990.

== Bilateral agreements ==
Over the years, several agreements and treaties have been signed by both nations such as a Treaty of Commerce and Navigation (1882); Air Transportation Agreement (1972); Technical Cooperation Agreement (1974); Cultural Cooperation Agreement (1976); Extradition Treaty (1990); Agreement on Visa Suppression (1995) and an Agreement to avoid Double-Taxation (2008).

== Transportation ==
There are direct flights between Spain and Venezuela through the following airlines: Air Europa and Iberia.

== Trade ==
In 2024, trade between Spain and Venezuela totaled €2.3 billion. Spanish exports to Venezuela include: food, automobile parts and electronic equipment. Venezuelan exports to Spain include: oil, fish, aluminum, chemical based products, iron and cacao. Spanish multinational companies such as Banco Bilbao Vizcaya Argentaria, Mapfre and Zara operate in Venezuela.

== Resident diplomatic missions ==
of Spain in Venezuela

- Caracas (Embassy)
- Caracas (Consulate-General)

of Venezuela in Spain

- Madrid (Embassy)
- Madrid (Consulate-General)
- Barcelona (Consulate-General)
- Bilbao (Consulate-General)
- Santa Cruz de Tenerife (Consulate-General)
- Vigo (Consulate-General)

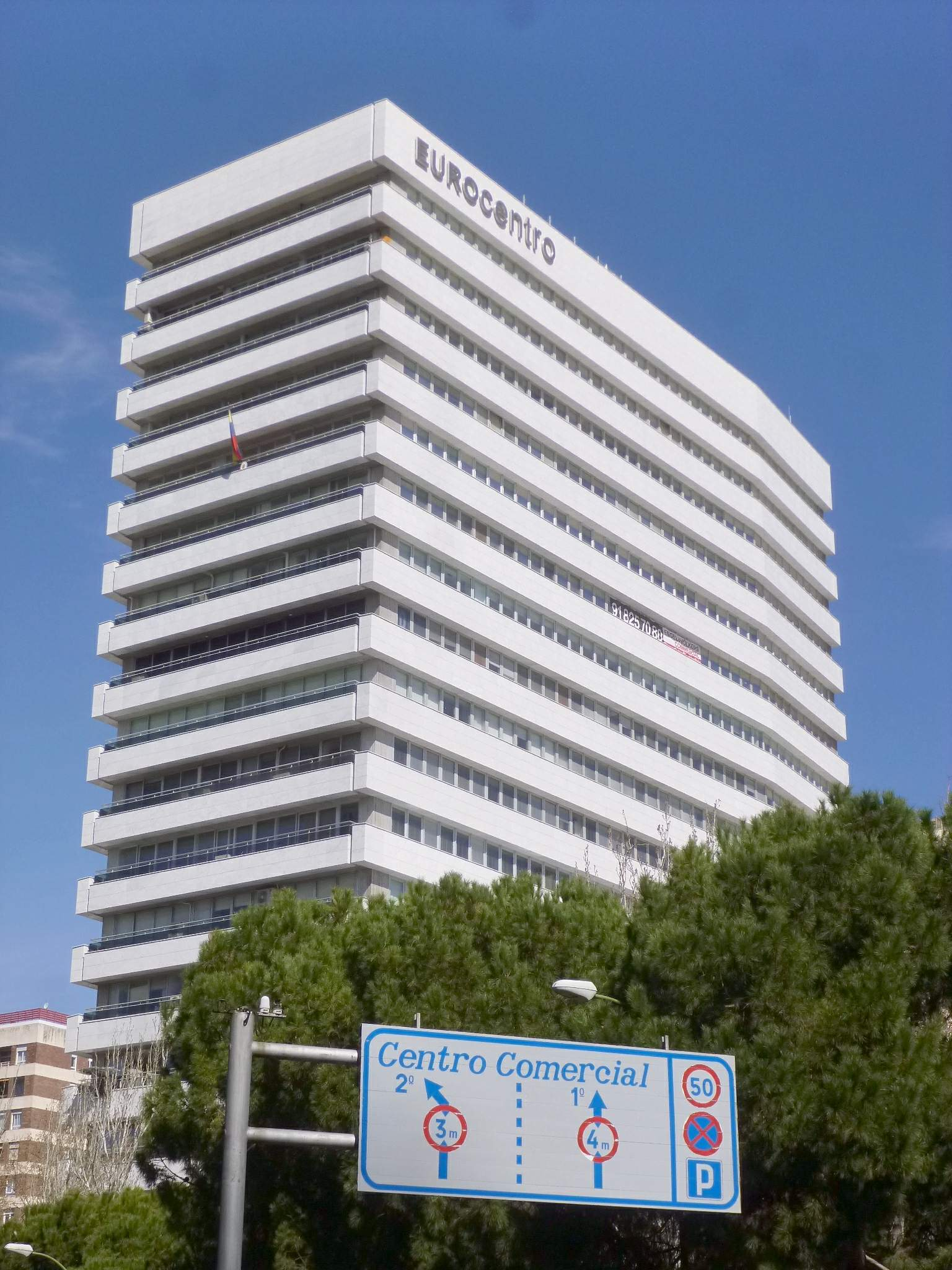
Building hosting the Embassy of Venezuela in Madrid

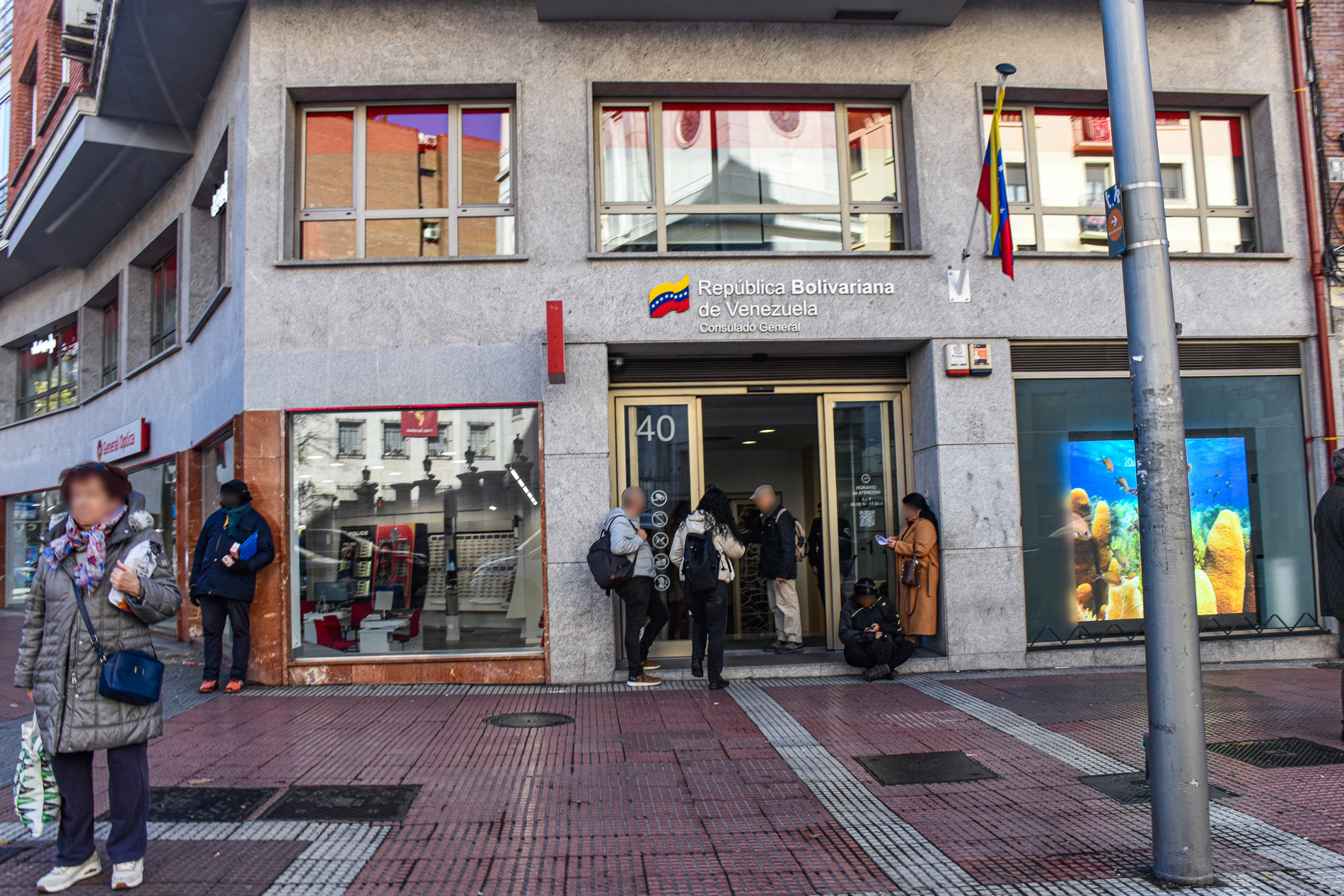
Consulate-General of Venezuela in Madrid

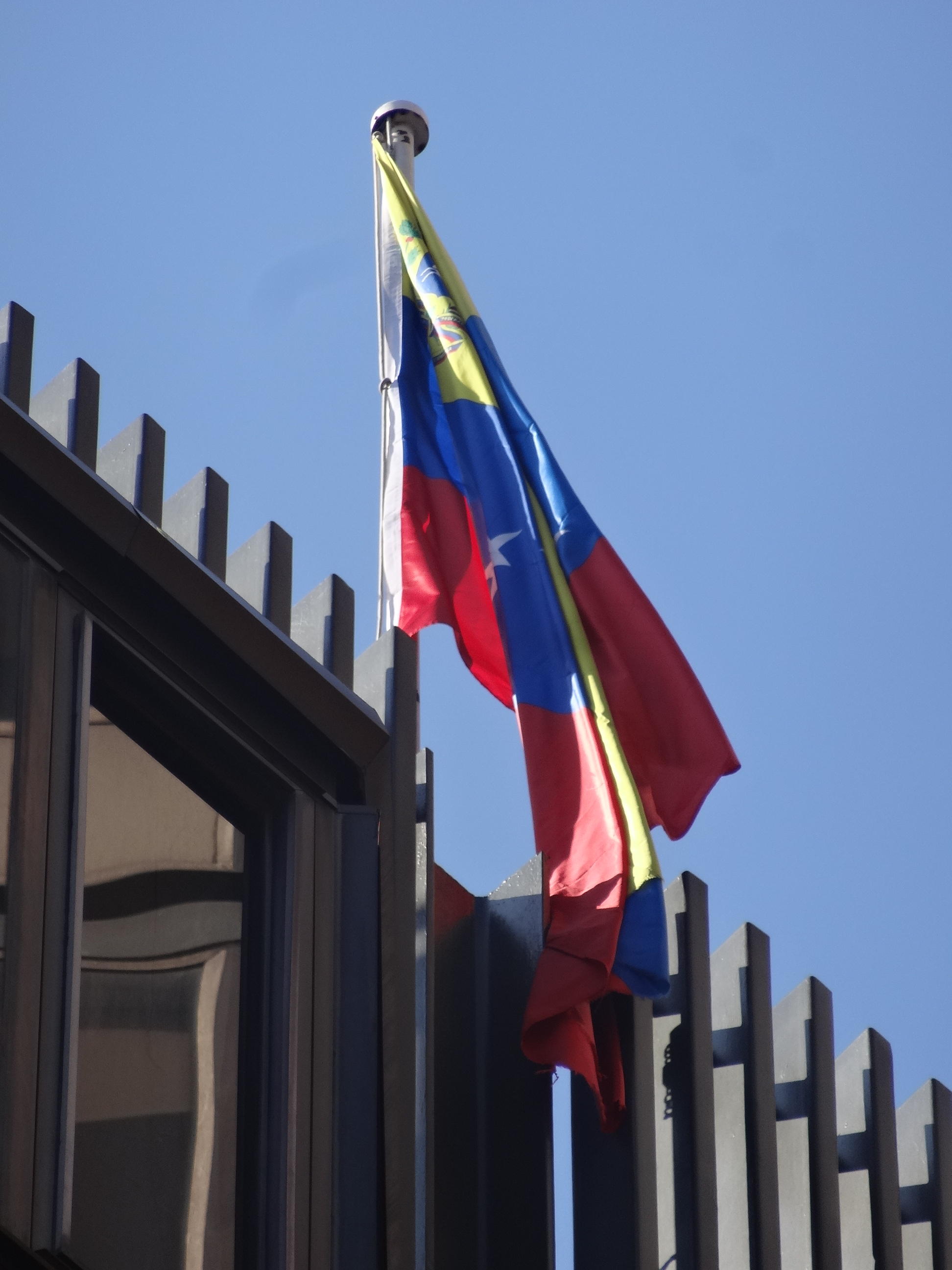
Consulate-General of Venezuela in Barcelona

== See also ==
- Foreign relations of Spain
- Foreign relations of Venezuela
- Spanish immigration to Venezuela
- Venezuelans in Spain
