= Královec Region =

Satirical Czech annexation of Kaliningrad Oblast

Weather report by TV Nova showing Kaliningrad Oblast (named "Královec") as part of the Czech Republic

Map of the Czech Republic (light green) and Kaliningrad Oblast (dark green) in Europe

The Královec Region (Czech pronunciation: [ˈkraːlovɛts]; Czech: Královecký kraj) is an internet meme consisting of a satirical annexation of Russia's Kaliningrad Oblast by the Czech Republic. The meme originated in 2022, as a way to poke fun at the Russian invasion of Ukraine.

== History ==
On 27 September 2022, the Czech satirical website AZ247.cz made a petition for the Czech Republic to send soldiers to Kaliningrad Oblast, hold an annexation referendum that would have a 98% vote in favor, and make the region a formal part of the country renamed as Královec, thus gaining access to the sea. This was in response to the annexation referendums in Russian-occupied Ukraine and the subsequent annexation of the Donetsk, Kherson, Luhansk, and Zaporizhzhia oblasts by Russia during its invasion of Ukraine.

Satirical calls for Czech annexation also extended to Franz Josef Land (Czech: Země Františka Josefa), an Arctic archipelago discovered during an expedition by a group including Czech individuals in 1873. It was named after Franz Joseph I, the Emperor-King of Austria-Hungary, the state the modern Czech Republic was part of at the time.

Various official figures and entities, including Jana Černochová (Czech Minister of Defence), Zuzana Čaputová (President of Slovakia), and the Embassy of the United States in Prague (as a followup to the planned F-35 acquisition by the Czech Republic) made satirical comments regarding the movement on Twitter.

On 10 October 2022, a few hundred people attended a mock referendum to perform the annexation of the region in front of the Embassy of Russia in Prague.

During an interview between the Czech journalists Petr Koubský and Filip Titlbach in an article for the Czech newspaper Deník N, it was attempted to find out if the proposal had any real or historical basis that could justify the satire. The city of Kaliningrad was originally named Königsberg (German for "King's Mountain") at its founding in honor of King Ottokar II of Bohemia, who attended the first crusade into the region. The predominantly German crusaders did so out of the pride of accompanying such an important person as the King of Bohemia, who was a respected person in the Holy Roman Empire, of which Bohemia was part, as his mother belonged to the prominent Hohenstaufen noble family. The satire was based on the fact that the Kingdom of Bohemia is a Czech kingdom preceding the modern Czech Republic. The name Královec is a calque of "Königsberg", from král "king", having seen use as a historical exonym. It is similar to the Polish exonym Królewiec, also a calque.

== See also ==
- Listenbourg
- Proposed Danish acquisition of California
- Whisky War
- Guiana Brasileira (meme)
