= Shut Up and Dance =

Shut Up and Dance may refer to:

== Music ==
- Shut Up and Dance (duo), an English dance music duo

=== Albums ===
- Shut Up and Dance (Victoria Duffield album) or the title song, 2012
- Shut Up and Dance: Mixes, by Paula Abdul, 1990

=== Songs ===
- "Shut Up and Dance" (Aerosmith song), 1994
- "Shut Up and Dance" (Walk the Moon song), 2014
- "Shut Up and Dance", by Better Than Ezra from All Together Now, 2014
- "Shut Up and Dance", by Pearl Harbor and the Explosions from Pearl Harbor and the Explosions, 1980
- "Shut Up and Dance", by the Pointer Sisters from Serious Slammin', 1988
- "Shut Up and Dance", by the Victorious cast from Victorious 2.0: More Music from the Hit TV Show, 2012

== Television ==
- "Shut Up and Dance" (Black Mirror), a 2016 episode
