= World Shut Your Mouth =

World Shut Your Mouth may be:

- World Shut Your Mouth (album), an album by Julian Cope
- "World Shut Your Mouth" (song), a single by Julian Cope from his album Saint Julian
- World Shut Your Mouth (TV series), a 2005 television series starring Dom Joly
- World Shut Your Mouth (DVD), a 2003 DVD by punk rock band The Dickies
