= Papa Don't Preach =

1986 single by Madonna

Single by Madonna

from the album True Blue
- B-side: "Pretender"; "Ain't No Big Deal"; "Think of Me"
- Released: June 11, 1986
- Studio: Channel Recording (Los Angeles)
- Genre: Dance-pop
- Length: 4:29
- Label: Sire; Warner Bros.
- Composer: Brian Elliot
- Lyricists: Elliot; Madonna
- Producers: Madonna; Stephen Bray

Madonna singles chronology
"Live to Tell" (1986)	"Papa Don't Preach" (1986)	"True Blue" (1986)

Music video
- "Papa Don't Preach" on YouTube

"Papa Don't Preach" is a song by American singer Madonna from her third studio album, True Blue (1986). It was written by Brian Elliot and Madonna and produced by Madonna and Stephen Bray. "Papa Don't Preach" blends dance-pop with elements of baroque, post-disco and classical music. Its lyrics tell the story of a teenage girl who confesses her unintended pregnancy to her father, pleading for him to withhold judgment while asserting her intention to keep her child.

"Papa Don't Preach" was inspired by teenage conversations Elliot overheard outside his recording studio. Originally written for a singer named Christina Dent, it was offered to Madonna after the Warner Bros. executive Michael Ostin intervened. Madonna adjusted portions of the lyrics. The music video, directed by James Foley, introduced a more muscular and mature look for Madonna, as she portrayed a conflicted young woman confronting her father, played by Danny Aiello. These scenes are intercut with shots of Madonna singing in a dark studio setting.

"Papa Don't Preach" was released on June 11, 1986, in the United States and shortly after in most European countries. It received acclaim, with particular praise for Madonna's more controlled vocals. It became Madonna's fourth number-one hit on the Billboard Hot 100 and topped the charts in countries such as Canada, the United Kingdom, and Australia.

The subject matter drew criticism from women's and family planning organizations, who accused Madonna of glamorizing teenage pregnancy. Conversely, pro-life groups praised it for seemingly endorsing motherhood over abortion. Madonna has performed "Papa Don't Preach" in five of her concert tours, the last being 2019–2020's Madame X Tour. During the Who's That Girl World Tour (1987), she dedicated the song to Pope John Paul II, prompting backlash from the Vatican and a call for Italian fans to boycott her concerts. In 2002, the English television personality Kelly Osbourne released a successful cover version.

== Recording ==
"Papa Don't Preach" was written by Brian Elliot, who drew inspiration from conversations he overheard among teenage girls outside his North Hollywood recording studio, which had a mirrored front window frequently used by high school students. Describing it as a "love song, maybe framed a little bit differently", Elliot said the lyrics focused on a young woman facing a difficult life decision.

In 1986, while working with the aspiring Warner Bros. artist Christina Dent, Elliot presented the demo of "Papa Don't Preach" to the A&R executive Michael Ostin, who had previously championed the Madonna song "Like a Virgin". Ostin saw potential and played the track for Madonna, who was creating her third studio album, True Blue. She expressed interest, prompting Ostin to negotiate its transfer. Though hesitant, Elliot agreed, later calling the opportunity to have Madonna record one of his songs "hard to resist". While her lyrical contributions were minimal, Madonna received a co-writing credit. She later said: "[The song] just fit right in with my own personal zeitgeist of standing up to male authorities, whether it's the pope, or the Catholic Church or my father and his conservative, patriarchal ways [...] That's why I thought it was so great."

The song was recorded at Channel Recording Studios in Los Angeles alongside the rest of True Blue. Upon meeting in the studio, Madonna reportedly asked Elliot if she had "wrecked his song", leading to a short but amicable discussion. The recording featured Patrick Leonard and Stephen Bray on keyboards and percussion, with Fred Zarr and Jonathan Moffett also contributing. Guitarists included David Williams, Bruce Gaitsch, and John Putnam, while backing vocals were performed by Siedah Garrett and Edie Lehmann. Zarr, who had worked on Madonna's 1983 debut album, created the signature string introduction while experimenting on an Emulator II synthesizer. Madonna, impressed, used it in the opening; Zarr was not credited.

== Composition ==
"Papa Don't Preach"
27-second audio sample of "Papa Don't Preach", featuring Madonna singing the chorus as she rejects her father's moralizing and asserts her decision to keep her unborn child.

"Papa Don't Preach" has been noted a dance-pop song that incorporates elements of baroque pop, post-disco, classical music, and 1960s-inspired psychedelia. Written in the key of F minor, the song is set in common time with a moderate tempo of 116 beats per minute. Madonna's vocal range spans from F_{3} to C_{5}, and her performance is marked by a more mature and restrained delivery than in her previous singles. It follows a standard verse-chorus form structure and opens with an orchestral string introduction described as "Vivaldian" in character, setting a dramatic tone before transitioning into a synth-driven arrangement with programmed drums and bass.

The lyrics are presented from the perspective of a teenage girl who confesses to her father that she is pregnant and has decided to keep the child. She pleads for understanding while asserting her independence: "Papa don't preach, I'm in trouble deep / But I've made up my mind, I'm keeping my baby". The verses depict her emotional turmoil, while the pre-chorus and bridge add intensity through increasingly dramatic vocal delivery. A Spanish-inspired acoustic guitar section appears mid-song, cited as one of Madonna's earliest incorporations of Latin musical influences.

In the second verse, the narrator describes her boyfriend's promise to marry and raise a family with her, while also acknowledging peer pressure to abandon the pregnancy. Some scholars have identified queer subtexts, noting that themes of secrecy, fear of rejection, and affirmation of identity can resonate with LGBTQ+ listeners.

== Release ==
"Papa Don't Preach" was released as the second single from True Blue on June 11, 1986, in the United States, and five days later in most European territories. (Note: See sources cited on "Weekly charts" section) It was included on Madonna's compilations The Immaculate Collection (1990) and Celebration (2009).

== Critical reception ==
"Papa Don’t Preach" was acclaimed. Rolling Stone's Davitt Sigerson praised it as the only song on True Blue with a hook as strong as Madonna's earlier hits, likening it to Michael Jackson's "Billie Jean" (1983). The Chicago Tribune deemed it "stunning", while AllMusic's Stephen Thomas Erlewine called it a "masterstroke". Entertainment Weekly's David Browne highlighted the unexpected emotional depth Madonna brought to the role of a pregnant teen, calling it a "perfectly conceived pop record". Peter Piatkowski from PopMatters described the track as an "idiosyncratic tune" that shares the maturity of Madonna's previous single, "Live to Tell".

Critics praised the departure from Madonna's earlier work. Adam Sexton, author of Desperately Seeking Madonna, deemed it the album's "boldest" track, comparing it to punk and new wave milestones like "Bodies" (1977) by Sex Pistols and Graham Parker's "You Can't Be Too Strong" (1979). From Slant Magazine, Sal Cinquemani wrote that with "Papa Don’t Preach", Madonna proved she had moved from pop star to consummate artist. The Observer–Reporter noted its shift away from Madonna's "sugar-coated" past, while The Guardian's Caroline Sullivan hailed it as her "first socially controversial single, and one of her best tunes to boot". Stereogum's Tom Breihan called it a "masterful piece of pop craftsmanship", showcasing Madonna's unique ability to convey emotion despite her limited vocal range.

Vocally, the track was also a breakthrough. The New York Times' Stephen Holden praised Madonna's "passionate, bratty sob", while the Los Angeles Times' Robert Hilburn noted her newfound vocal control. Author Matthew Rettenmund described it as featuring "some of the strongest vocals Madonna ever recorded". The Arizona Republic's Ed Masley noted that the track contained "More soul than was expected at the time", and Albumism's Justin Chadwick deemed it "arguably the most unforgettable of True Blue's many memorable moments". People magazine summed it up: "Arguably the best track from the True Blue album, ['Papa Don’t Preach'] gets straight to the heart of a lot of what makes Madonna, Madonna: sex, rebellion against the patriarchy, and a whole lot of Catholicism thrown in. [...] It’s a fantastic song, and it will always be one of [her] best".

There were a few critics who offered more mixed or dismissive takes. Author Rikky Rooksby felt that, while the chorus was "punchy enough" and the acoustic guitar solo "pleasant", the song overall was "musically a trifle under-powered". Jeff Hamilton from The Daily Iowan questioned whether Madonna's music could be taken seriously, claiming that, "in terms of scrutable ideology, ['Papa Don't Preach'] doesn't represent a change from 'Like a Virgin'". The Record-Journal's Jim Zebora panned the track as "perfectly annoying".

=== Recognition ===
The song also earned industry recognition, receiving a nomination for Best Female Pop Vocal Performance at the 29th Grammy Awards, though it ultimately lost to Barbra Streisand's The Broadway Album. In retrospective rankings, "Papa Don’t Preach" is frequently cited as one of Madonna's finest singles. Billboard ranked it 28th among her best songs, while Parade placed it at number 25, with Samuel R. Murrian commending its humane and serious approach to a complicated subject. Both Entertainment Weekly's Chuck Arnold and Slant Magazine ranked it as Madonna's 21st greatest song, with the latter's Paul Schrodt noting it may be the only pop track about choosing not to have an abortion that feels "rebellious, even dangerous". Additional praise came from HuffPost (ranked 14th), Gay Star News (10th), The Guardian (5th), and PinkNews, where Nayer Missim ranked it third, calling it a "rare example of Madonna-as-storyteller", with lyrics that are "personal, open and interesting". (Note: Per multiple sources)

== Chart performance ==
"Papa Don’t Preach" debuted on the Billboard Hot 100 at number 42 on June 28, 1986, after being added to 174 of 226 reporting pop radio stations. Within a month, it rose to number six, marking Madonna's ninth consecutive top-ten single. This achievement made her the fourth female artist in the rock era to reach that milestone, following Brenda Lee, Aretha Franklin, and Donna Summer. The song reached number one on August 16 (Madonna's birthday), where it remained for two weeks, becoming Madonna's fourth chart-topper and eighth consecutive top-five hit in the United States. It also peaked at number four on the Adult Contemporary chart and number 16 on the Dance/Disco Club Play chart. By year's end, it ranked 29th on the Hot 100's annual list and was certified gold by the Recording Industry Association of America (RIAA) for shipments exceeding 500,000 units. In Canada, "Papa Don't Preach" climbed to number one on the RPM 100 Singles chart and stayed there for two weeks, becoming Madonna's fourth number-one single in the nation. It placed 13th on the year-end ranking.

Internationally, the song was equally successful. It debuted at number 13 on the UK Singles Chart and peaked at number one two weeks later, holding the top spot for three weeks and remaining on the chart for 15 weeks total. It was certified Gold by the British Phonographic Industry (BPI) and has sold over 629,000 copies in the UK as of 2008. Across Europe, the track topped the charts in Belgium, Ireland, and Norway, and reached the top five in Austria, France, Germany, the Netherlands, Spain, and Switzerland. It also spent 11 weeks atop the European Hot 100 Singles chart. Outside Europe, it reached number one in Australia and charted within the top five in both South Africa and New Zealand.

== Music video ==
=== Background ===
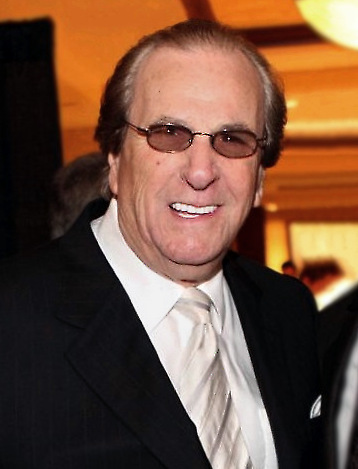
Danny Aiello played Madonna's father in the video.

The music video for "Papa Don’t Preach" was directed by James Foley, with David Naylor and Sharon Oreck as producers, and Michael Ballhaus as director of photography. Having previously worked with Foley on "Live to Tell", Madonna wanted a video that felt more realistic and emotionally grounded, in contrast to her earlier, more stylized visuals. The team decided to shoot in Staten Island to reflect a working-class setting. Filming took three days, including scenes aboard the ferry. Actor Danny Aiello was cast as her father —a decision influenced by Madonna's then-husband Sean Penn and Aiello's own daughter, who was a fan. Alex McArthur played Madonna's romantic interest, and her close friends Debi Mazar, Erika Belle, and Bianca Hunter made brief appearances.

The video marked Madonna's first full image transformation, trading her layered accessories and flamboyant style for a leaner, more minimalist look inspired by the gamine look of 1950s icons like Audrey Hepburn and Shirley MacLaine. (Note: Per multiple sources) The narrative centers on an Italian American teenager who becomes pregnant and seeks her father's understanding. The video juxtaposes this storyline with stylized black-and-white shots of Madonna performing the chorus in a small dark studio. Author David James noted that Madonna intentionally included these performance scenes to highlight her fitness and distance herself from the "streetwise tramp" image of her early years. Foley later recalled their literal approach to the song's lyrics, explaining:

We took the script literally from the lyrics of the song, and I remember having a moment's hesitation about doing that because most videos are not literal interpretations. But I just felt like it was something that tied into her desire to dip into the working-class world. [We] did have the idea that there should be a segment of the video where she was Madonna —not the character in the story— and that's where it cuts to the black and white stuff of her dancing around for the chorus.

=== Synopsis ===
Screenshot of the "Papa Don't Preach" video, showcasing Madonna's new look, reminiscent of Marilyn Monroe, Jean Seberg and Kim Novak, as noted by Georges-Claude Guilbert.

The video opens with aerial shots of New York City, including the skyline, the Statue of Liberty, and the Staten Island Ferry. Madonna portrays a tomboyish sixteen-year-old in the early stages of pregnancy, walking with a "determined" gaze through the streets. She wears tight jeans, a striped boatneck sweater, and casually slings a leather jacket over her shoulder; her hair is styled in a short, pixie cut. At home, flashbacks reveal her upbringing as the only child of a single father (Aiello). The narrative is intercut with stylized footage of Madonna performing the song in front of a black backdrop. In these scenes, her look is more "glamorous", featuring a black bustier, pedal pushers, curled hair, red lips, and heavily glossed eyes.

In another flashback, the protagonist meets and falls for a mechanic (McArthur), while wearing a black T-shirt emblazoned with the phrase "Italians do it better". She skips out on time with her girlfriends to be with him, and the couple shares a romantic moment aboard the ferry, reflecting on their future after watching an elderly couple nearby. As the story progresses, the teenager decides to keep the baby but grows increasingly anxious about telling her father. A symbolic scene shows her climbing a long stone staircase before the camera pans over the neighborhood. Upon confessing to her father, he is initially shocked and withdraws. In the closing moments, he returns, visibly emotional, and the video ends with a heartfelt hug between father and daughter.

=== Reception and analysis ===
Critical reception of the music video for "Papa Don't Preach" was generally positive. Stephen Holden described Madonna's performance as "virtuoso", drawing parallels to "Billie Jean" in terms of cultural impact. Author Mary Gabriel praised the visual for echoing the song's emotional complexity, while also noting it broke with traditional depictions of teen pregnancy by refusing to frame the protagonist with shame. Gabriel added that Madonna began drawing comparisons to Bruce Springsteen for how she addressed working-class experiences. Rolling Stone wrote that the video marked a shift in Madonna's approach, treating music videos more like short films. Others, like Hal Marcovitz, Mark Bego, and Slant Magazine's Eric Mason saw the video as a stark departure from her earlier, glamorous image; a move Madonna managed without alienating her audience. The leather jacket, short blonde hair, and "Italians Do It Better" T-shirt have since been recognized by critics and publications as an "iconic" part of her evolving visual identity. (Note: Per multiple sources)

Retrospective commentary has ranked the video among Madonna's finest. It placed at number 12 on Slant Magazine's list, number 16 on TheBacklot.com's, and number 15 on Parade's. The Odyssey named it Madonna's fourth-best video, praising its depiction of New York life and more serious tone. Critics like Louis Virtel highlighted the "urgency" and "Ciccone angst" in Madonna's performance, while others, including HuffPost and Slant's Sal Cinquemani, labeled it among her most controversial. A The Independent retrospective summed it up: "Tackling the subject of an unplanned pregnancy, ['Papa Don't Preach'] was heavy on storyline, and set Madonna out as an artist who could do serious as well as sexy and fun. It is a testament to her stardom at this point that the video brought much excitement simply because she had dyed her hair blonde". The video is included in her compilations The Immaculate Collection (1990) and Celebration: The Video Collection (2009).

The video has drawn varied analytical interpretations over time. Journalist Ellen Goodman criticized it as a "commercial for teen-age pregnancy", arguing it glamorized a situation few teenagers would realistically experience, while singer Cyndi Lauper echoed this sentiment, stressing that real-life teen motherhood is far more complex and difficult. A 1993 study found that racial and gender perspectives influenced how young viewers interpreted the video: African American teens were more likely to view it as a story about father–daughter dynamics, whereas white teens primarily associated it with pregnancy. Scholars such as Susanne Hamscha and Amy Robinson have explored the video's ideological ambivalence —highlighting its tension between feminism and patriarchy, private and public spheres, and parental consent in the abortion debate. Carol Vernallis compared the narrative ambiguity in the video to that of No Doubt's "Don't Speak" (1995), noting how both rely on visual and lyrical vagueness that invites viewers to fill in the emotional and temporal gaps.

== Controversy ==
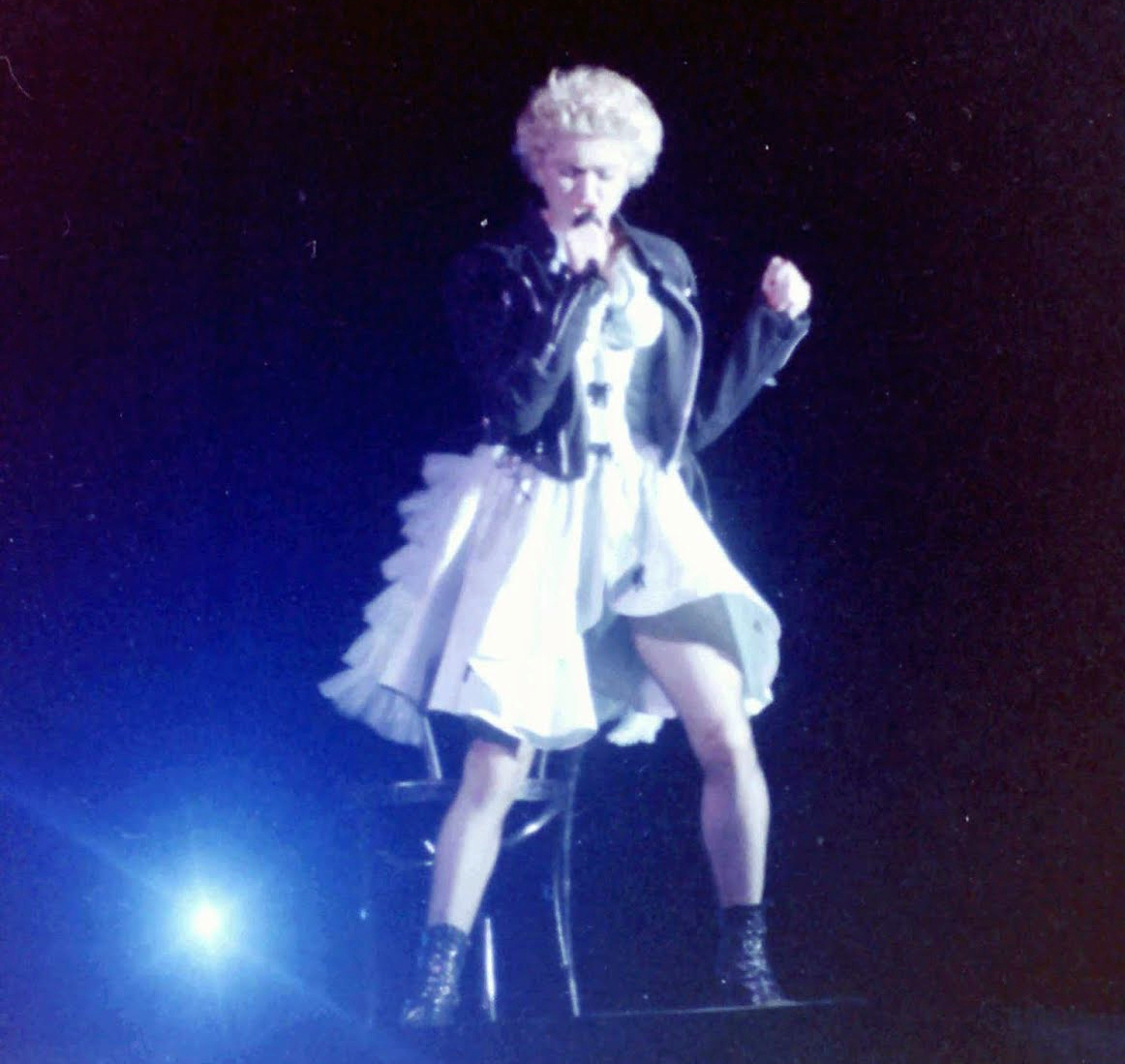
The song's performance on the Who's That Girl World Tour (1987) marked Madonna's first conflict with the Vatican.

As the popularity of "Papa Don't Preach" grew in the United States, it drew both praise and criticism from groups engaged in debates over pregnancy and abortion. Conservative voices interpreted the song as promoting a pro-life message, while feminist and family planning organizations accused Madonna of glamorizing teenage pregnancy. Gloria Allred, representing the National Organization for Women (NOW), called for Madonna to offer a counterstatement, while Planned Parenthood's Alfred Moran urged radio and television stations to reconsider airing the song and video, claiming it portrayed pregnancy as fashionable and defiant. Anticipating controversy, Madonna told The New York Times: "['Papa Don't Preach'] is a message song that everyone is going to take the wrong way. Immediately they're going to say I am advising every young girl to go out and get pregnant", but clarified it was about a young woman making her own choice while preserving her relationship with her father. Though she declined further comment on the political interpretation, her publicist stated, "[she's] singing a song, not taking a stand".

Meanwhile, anti-abortion advocates welcomed the song's perceived message. Susan Carpenter-McMillan, of Feminists for Life (FFL), praised it for presenting an alternative to abortion, while Mary Elizabeth "Tipper" Gore —who had previously condemned Madonna's 1985 single "Dress You Up" as sexually explicit— described "Papa Don't Preach" as an "important song" that addressed a real social issue. Elliot himself remarked, "if [Madonna] has influenced [pregnant] young girls to keep their babies, I don't think that's such a bad deal". Critics like Joyce Millman lauded it not only for tackling teen pregnancy, but for emphasizing the importance of communication between parents and children. Mary Gabriel noted that in a decade dominated by religious discourse on abortion and Roe v. Wade, Madonna's portrayal returned agency to the woman. Still, controversy persisted: during 1987's Who's That Girl World Tour, Madonna dedicated the performance to Pope John Paul II, prompting Vatican condemnation and calls for concert boycotts. In 2016, Spin magazine included "Papa Don't Preach" among the most controversial songs of all time.

== Live performances ==
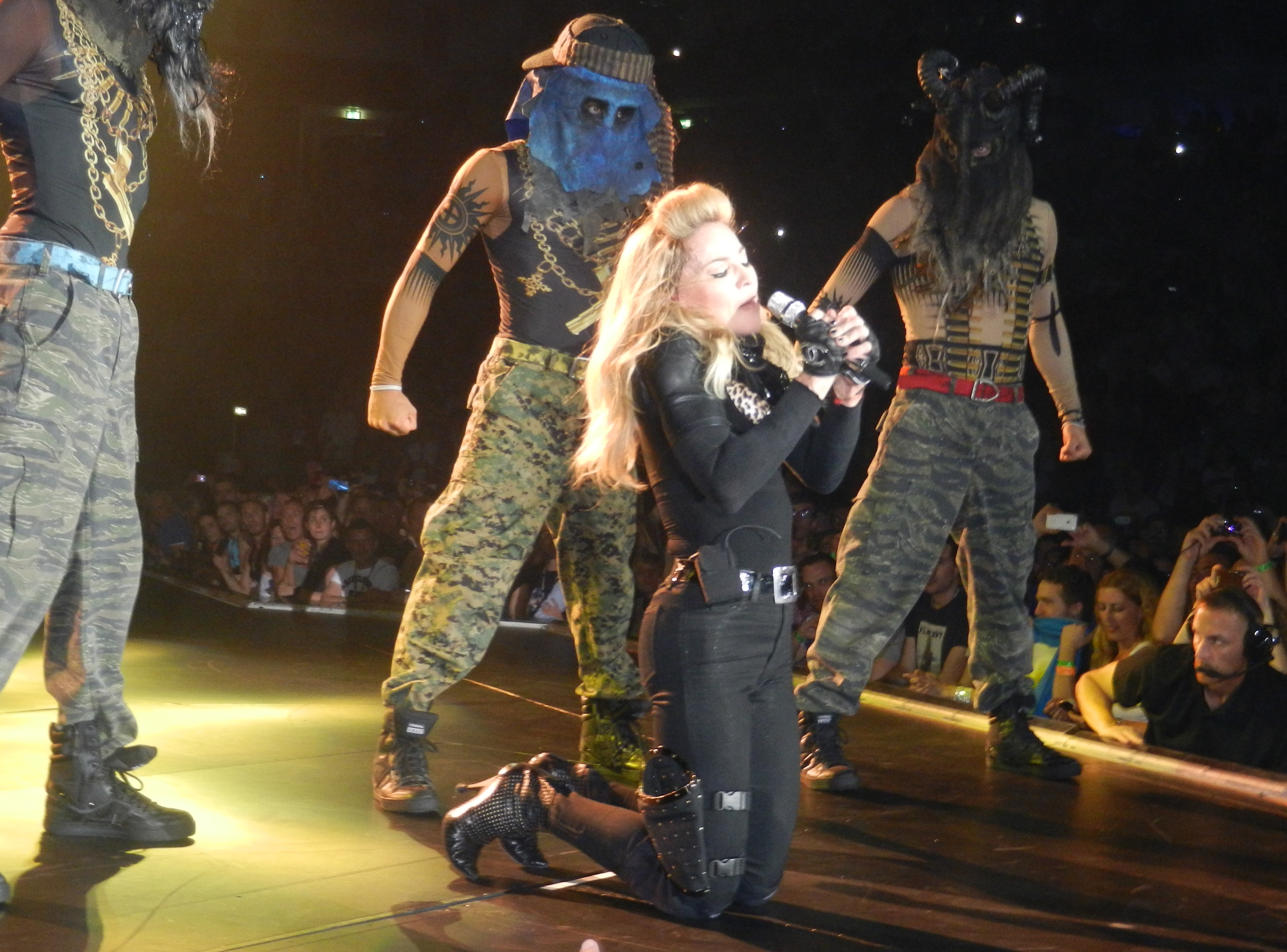
Madonna performing "Papa Don't Preach" on the MDNA Tour (2012)

"Papa Don't Preach" has been included in five of Madonna's concert tours: Who's That Girl, Blond Ambition (1990), Re-Invention (2004), MDNA (2012), and Madame X (2019―2020). On the first one, she sang wearing a 1950s-style blue dress and leather jacket, against visuals that included images of Pope John Paul II, President Ronald Reagan, the White House, and the phrase "Safe sex". Jon Pareles of The New York Times noted that she mimicked the True Blue cover art by tilting her chin during the number. This rendition was captured in Who's That Girl: Live in Japan and Ciao Italia: Live from Italy, filmed in Tokyo and Turin, respectively.

On the Blond Ambition Tour, the song was reimagined with Catholic imagery. Madonna wore black clerical robes and performed in a cathedral-like set, accompanied by seven dancers in a routine that blended classical ballet and modern choreography. The Orlando Sentinel highlighted the performance's gospel energy and gothic organ backing. This version appeared in the tour videos Blond Ambition Japan Tour 90 and Blond Ambition World Tour Live.

In subsequent tours, Madonna continued to reinvent the performance. On the Re-Invention Tour, she wore a plaid kilt and a "Kabbalists Do It Better" shirt ―a nod to the music video― incorporating a whimsical circle dance. Newsday praised the number's playful tone. The MDNA Tour's performance featured a darker staging, with Madonna bound by military figures in a dystopian setting; The Kansas City Star called it a crowd-pleasing moment. A recording of the song appears in the MDNA World Tour live album (2013). "Papa Don't Preach" was one of the songs performed during Madonna's visit to The Late Late Show with James Corden in December 2016.

Madonna performed a brief, altered version on the Madame X Tour, changing the lyric to "I'm not keeping my baby" as a pro-choice statement, set against a backdrop of Susanna and the Elders by Artemisia Gentileschi. The Chicago Sun-Times commended the reinterpretation's political edge. Three years later, the string introduction was repurposed as a coda to "Erotica" (1992) on the Celebration Tour (2023―2024), accompanying a provocative routine that referenced the Blond Ambition choreography and costume. Some critics, however, lamented the absence of the full track.

== Covers ==
=== Kelly Osbourne ===
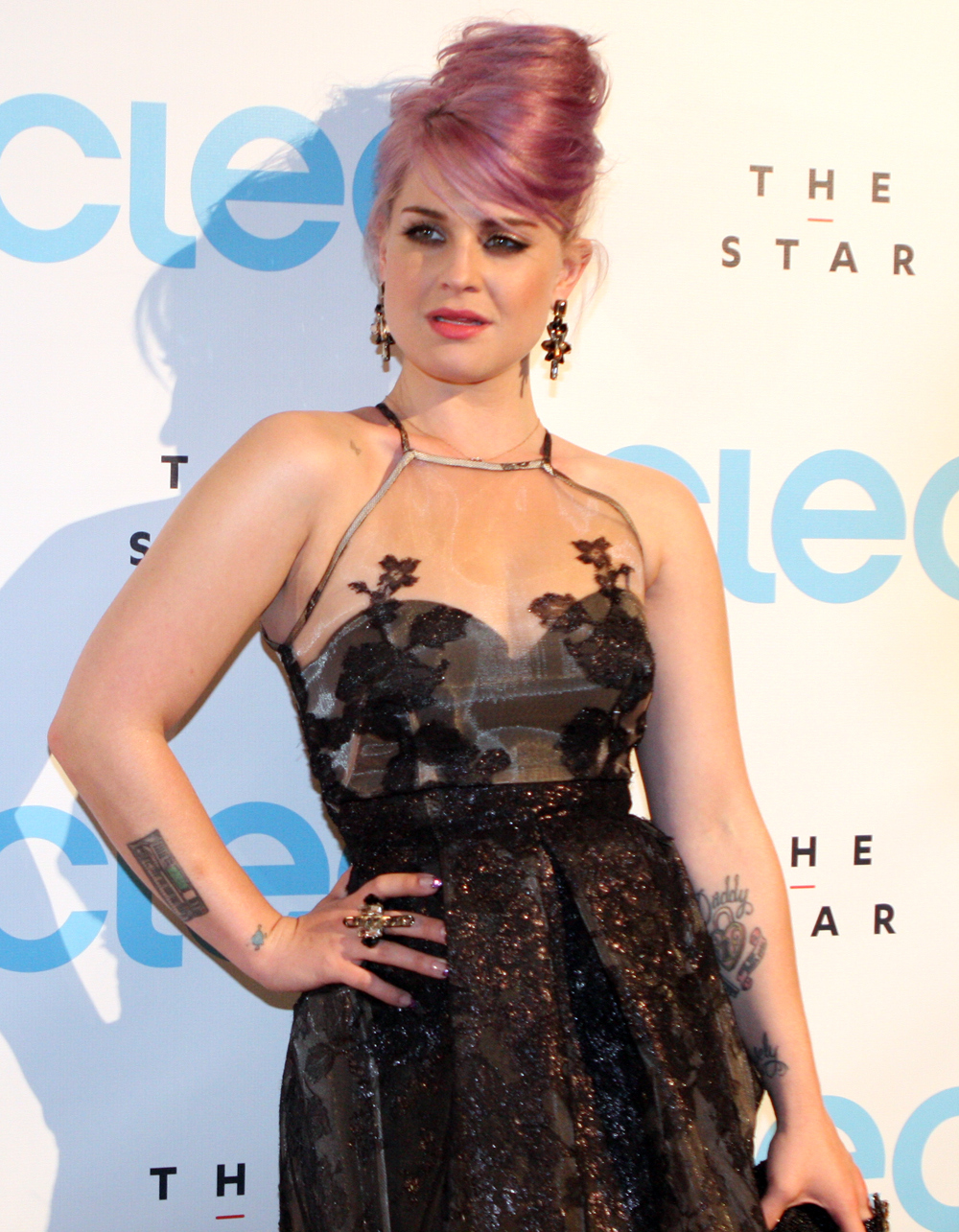
Kelly Osbourne's (picture) 2002 cover received mixed critical reviews but achieved commercial success in both the United Kingdom and Australia.

British personality Kelly Osbourne recorded a pop-metal cover of "Papa Don't Preach" in 2002, originally as a rough demo suggested by her mother, Sharon Osbourne. Produced by her brother Jack and featuring Incubus members Mike Einziger and Jose Pasillas, the initial version caught the attention of MTV executives, who requested a studio recording for The Osbourne Family Album soundtrack. According to Osbourne, the project was first offered to her sister Aimee, who declined and recommended Kelly instead. The final version, recorded without the Incubus musicians, was released as a single on August 13, 2002, and later included as a hidden bonus track on Osbourne's debut album Shut Up (2003). A music video directed by Marcos Siega accompanied the release, alongside promotional performances on The Tonight Show with Jay Leno and the MTV Movie Awards. Asked about the decision to cover the track, Osbourne remarked, "I love Madonna. Who doesn't?"

Critical reception to the cover was mixed. Billboard's Chuck Arnold described it as an "aggressive post-punk anthem" with appeal, while NME's Peter Robinson and Entertainment Weekly's Rob Brunner dismissed it as unnecessary and incoherent. Despite this, the single achieved significant commercial success, peaking at number three in both the United Kingdom and Australia, where it was certified platinum. It also charted within the top ten in Ireland and Finland, and reached the top 40 in several other countries, including Germany, Italy, and New Zealand.

=== Other artists and versions ===
In 1986, American artist "Weird Al" Yankovic included "Papa Don't Preach" as part of his polka medley "Polka Party!", on the album of the same name. That same year, Danny Aiello released an answer song titled "Papa Wants the Best for You", written by Artie Schroeck and told from the father's perspective. Aiello explained that the characters in the original seemed "unable to talk to one another about something that is going to change their lives forever", prompting him to offer his own interpretation. He recorded a music video for the song and invited Madonna to appear, though she declined. In 1987, Dutch heavy metal band Angus released a rendition titled "Papa Don't Freak!", while Canadian singer Céline Dion performed a comedic tribute on a sketch show, dressed in a costume inspired by Madonna's video look.

In the UK, television adverts for Vauxhall in 1999 used the orchestral introduction from "Papa Don't Preach" as a jingle. Following this, the same orchestral part was sampled by the Derby-based act Progress Presents the Wunder Boy on their dance single "Everybody", which released number seven on the UK Singles Chart in December 1999. Chart watcher James Masterton described the use of the sample as "a concept so simple you wondered why nobody thought of it before."

In subsequent years, "Papa Don't Preach" continued to inspire reinterpretations across genres. In 2002, French–Dutch group Mad'House recorded a Eurodance version for their album Absolutely Mad. A year later, Irish band Picturehouse covered the song for the compilation Even Better Than the Real Thing Vol. 1. In 2004, American singer Mario Winans sampled it in his track "Never Really Was". Tribute albums also featured versions by Brook Barros (The Music of Madonna, 2005) and jazz act Bo.Da (Bo.Da Plays Madonna in Jazz, 2007). The song was performed by Dianna Agron in the 2009 Glee episode "Hairography", and in 2019, Palestinian artist and activist Shahd Abusalama released a parody titled "Madonna Don't Go", which urged Madonna to cancel her scheduled performance at the Eurovision Song Contest in Israel.

== Track listing and formats ==
- US 7-inch single
1. "Papa Don't Preach" – 4:27
2. "Pretender" – 4:28
- UK 7-inch single
1. "Papa Don't Preach" – 4:27
2. "Ain't No Big Deal" – 4:12
- Japan 7-inch single
1. "Papa Don't Preach" (Radio Edit) – 3:47
2. "Think of Me" – 4:54
- International CD Video single
1. "Papa Don't Preach" – 4:27
2. "Papa Don't Preach" (Extended Remix) – 5:43
3. "Pretender" – 4:28
4. "Papa Don't Preach" (Video) – 5:00
- US 12-inch maxi-single
1. "Papa Don't Preach" (Extended Remix) – 5:43
2. "Pretender" – 4:28
- European limited edition 12-inch single
1. A1."Papa Don't Preach" (Extended Version) – 5:45
2. B1."Ain't No Big Deal" – 4:12
3. B2."Papa Don't Preach" – 4:27
- Germany CD Maxi-single (1995)
1. "Papa Don't Preach" (Extended Version) – 5:45
2. "Ain't No Big Deal" – 4:12
3. "Papa Don't Preach" – 4:27
- Digital Single (2024)
1. "Papa Don't Preach" – 4:28
2. "Ain't No Big Deal" – 4:13
3. "Papa Don't Preach" (Extended Remix) – 5:42

== Personnel ==
Personnel are adapted from the liner notes of both the True Blue album and US twelve-inch single.

- Brian Elliot – Music and lyrics
- Madonna – additional lyrics, producer, lead vocals
- Stephen Bray – producer, keyboards, synth bass, drums, percussion
- Reggie Lucas – producer of "Ain't No Big Deal"
- David Williams – rhythm guitar
- Bruce Gaitsch – electric guitar
- John Putnam – acoustic guitar, electric guitar
- Fred Zarr – additional keyboards
- Jonathan Moffett – percussion
- Billy Meyers – string arrangements
- Siedah Garrett – background vocals
- Edie Lehmann – background vocals
- Herb Ritts – photography
- Jeri McManus – design

== Charts ==
=== Weekly charts ===
Chart (1986)	Peak position
Australia (Kent Music Report)	1
Austria (Ö3 Austria Top 40)	4
Belgium (Ultratop 50 Flanders)	1
Brazil (ABPD)	9
Canada Top Singles (RPM)	1
Canada Retail Singles (The Record)	1
Denmark (IFPI)	1
Ecuador (UPI)	8
El Salvador (AP)	2
European Hot 100 Singles (Music & Media)	1
European Airplay Top 50 (Music & Media)	1
Finland (Suomen virallinen lista)	1
France (SNEP)	3
Guatemala (AP)	1
Greece (IFPI)	1
Iceland (RÚV)	2
Italy (Musica e dischi)	1
Japan (Oricon Singles Chart)	36
Ireland (IRMA)	1
Netherlands (Dutch Top 40)	2
Netherlands (Single Top 100)	1
New Zealand (Recorded Music NZ)	3
Norway (VG-lista)	1
Panama (UPI)	1
Portugal (AFP)	1
South Africa (Springbok Radio)	4
Spain (AFYVE)	4
Sweden (Sverigetopplistan)	6
Switzerland (Schweizer Hitparade)	2
UK Singles (Official Charts)	1
US Billboard Hot 100	1
US Adult Contemporary (Billboard)	16
US Dance Club Songs (Billboard)	4
US Dance Singles Sales (Billboard)	1
US Cash Box Top 100	1
US CHR & Pop (Radio & Records)	1
West Germany (GfK)	2

=== Year-end charts ===
Chart (1986)	Position
Australia (Kent Music Report)	9
Austria (Ö3 Austria Top 40)	21
Belgium (Ultratop 50 Flanders)	6
Brazil (Brazilian Radio Airplay)	70
Canada Top Singles (RPM)	13
Denmark (Hitlisten)	6
European Hot 100 Singles (Music & Media)	1
France (SNEP)	35
Italy (Musica e dischi)	6
Netherlands (Dutch Top 40)	9
Netherlands (Single Top 100)	13
New Zealand (RIANZ)	13
Norway (VG-lista)	9
Switzerland (Schweizer Hitparade)	14
UK Singles (OCC)	8
US Billboard Hot 100	29
US 12-inch Sales Singles (Billboard)	29
US Dance/Disco Club Play (Billboard)	43
US Cash Box Top 100	18
West Germany (Media Control)	18

=== Decade-end charts ===
Chart (1980–1989)	Position
Netherlands (Dutch Top 40)	75

== Certifications and sales ==
Certifications and sales for "Papa Don't Preach"
Region	Certification	Certified units/sales
Belgium (BRMA)	Gold	100,000
France (SNEP)	Silver	300,000
Japan (Oricon Charts)	—	34,410
New Zealand (RMNZ)	Gold	15,000^{‡}
United Kingdom (BPI)	Gold	651,000
United States (RIAA)	Platinum	1,000,000^{‡}
^{‡} Sales+streaming figures based on certification alone.

== Bibliography ==
- Aiello, Dany (2015). I Only Know Who I Am When I Am Somebody Else: My Life on the Street, On the Stage, and in the Movies. Gallery Books. ISBN 9781476751917.
- Bego, Mark (2000). Madonna: Blonde Ambition. Cooper Square Press. ISBN 978-0-8154-1051-5.
- Bielen, Kenneth G. (1999). The Lyrics of Civility: Biblical Images and Popular Music Lyrics in American Culture. Routledge. ISBN 0-8153-3193-2.
- Buddenbaum, Judith M. (2009). Scandals in American History: Religious Scandals. ABC-Clio. ISBN 978-0-313-34688-0.
- Chapman, Roger (2010). Culture Wars: An Encyclopedia of Issues, Viewpoints, and Voices. M. E. Sharpe. ISBN 9780765622501.
- Clerk, Carol (2002). Madonnastyle. Omnibus Press. ISBN 0-7119-8874-9.
- Cooper Owens, Deirdre; de Londras, Fiona; Gutierrez-Romine, Alicia; Schoen, Johanna; Tillet, Salamishah; Wulf, Karin (2024). Roe v. Wade: Fifty Years After. University of Georgia Press. ISBN 978-0820365695.
- Crawford, Sue (2013). Sharon Osbourne: Unauthorized, Uncensored - Understood. Michael O'Mara Books. ISBN 9781782432029.
- Easlea, Daryl (2012). Madonna: Blond Ambition. Backbeat Books. ISBN 9781617130342.
- Fouz-Hernández, Santiago; Jarman-Ivens, Freya (2004). Madonna's Drowned Worlds. Ashgate Publishing, Ltd. ISBN 0-7546-3372-1.
- Gabriel, Mary (2023). Madonna: A Rebel Life. Hachette UK. ISBN 978-0316456449.
- Guilbert, Georges-Claude (2002). Madonna as Postmodern Myth. McFarland. ISBN 0-7864-1408-1.
- Hamscha, Susanne (2013). The Fiction of America: Performance and the Cultural Imaginary in Literature and Film. Campus Verlag. ISBN 978-3-593-39872-3.
- Hart, Lynda; Phelan, Peggy (1993). Acting Out: Feminist Performances. University of Michigan Press. ISBN 0-472-06479-7.
- James, David (1991). Madonna: Her complete story - An unauthorized biography. Publications International. ISBN 0451822404.
- Jamieson, Patrick; Rober, Daniel (2008). The Changing Portrayal of Adolescents in the Media Since 1950. Oxford University Press. ISBN 978-0190451103.
- Lauper, Cyndi (2011). Cyndi Lauper: A Memoir. Simon & Schuster. ISBN 978-1-4391-4785-6.
- Mansour, David (2005). From Abba to Zoom: A Pop Culture Encyclopedia of the Late 20th Century. Andrews McMeel Publishing. ISBN 0-7407-5118-2.
- Marcovitz, Hal (2012). The History of Music Videos. Greenhaven Publishing LLC. ISBN 9781420509762.
- Metz, Allen; Benson, Carol (1999). The Madonna Companion: Two Decades of Commentary. Music Sales Group. ISBN 0-8256-7194-9.
- Mitchell, Jolyon P. (2000). Visually Speaking: Radio and the Renaissance of Preaching. Westminster – John Knox Press. ISBN 0-664-22244-7.
- McKeen, William (2000). Rock and Roll is Here to Stay. W. W. Norton & Company. ISBN 0-393-04700-8.
- Rettenmund, Matthew (1995). Encyclopedia Madonnica. St. Martin's Press. ISBN 0-312-11782-5.
- Rooksby, Rikky (2004). The Complete Guide to the Music of Madonna. Omnibus Press. ISBN 0-7119-9883-3.
- Sexton, Adam (1992). Desperately Seeking Madonna: In Search of the Meaning of the World's Most Famous Woman. Random Penguin. ISBN 0-307-48374-6.
- Taraborrelli, Randy J. (2002). Madonna: An Intimate Biography. Simon & Schuster. ISBN 0-7432-2880-4.
- Vernallis, Carol (2004). Experiencing Music Video: Aesthetics and Cultural Context. Columbia University Press. ISBN 978-0-231-11799-9.
- Voller, Debbi (1999). Madonna: The Style Book. Omnibus Press. ISBN 0-7119-7511-6.
