= Shut Up (Kelly Osbourne album) =

Studio album by Kelly Osbourne
- Released: 26 November 2002
- Studio: Record Plant
- Genre: Pop-punk
- Length: 39:46
- Label: Epic
- Producers: Ric Wake; Marc Russell; Thomas R. Yezzi

Kelly Osbourne chronology
Shut Up (2002)	Sleeping in the Nothing (2005)

Singles from Shut Up
- 1. "Papa Don't Preach" Released: June 2002; 2. "Shut Up" Released: 28 October 2002; 3. "Come Dig Me Out" Released: March 2003; 4. "Changes" Released: 30 September 2003

Changes

Professional ratings
Review scores
Source	Rating
AllMusic	link
Rolling Stone	link
Robert Christgau	(3-star Honorable Mention)

Shut Up is the debut studio album by British singer-songwriter Kelly Osbourne. The album is a pop-punk album, released by Epic Records. Released on 26 November 2002, the album was met with a mixed reception from music critics, however, the album was met with poor sales which led to her consequent drop from Epic Records. Shut Up was later re-released in 2003 as Changes, featuring her and her father Ozzy's cover of the Black Sabbath song of the same name. The album features a cover of Madonna's song "Papa Don't Preach".

== Reception ==
Shut Up received mixed reviews by critics. People magazine said "it takes a whole lot more than the right pedigree and the right haircut to make credible punk rock". The album had sold 155,000 copies in the US by 11 September 2003, according to Nielsen SoundScan.

== Track listing ==
All songs written by Kelly Osbourne and PowerPack (Mike Beans Benigno, Chris Goercke, Tom Yezzi, Marc Russell), except where noted.

1. "Disconnected" – 3:52
2. "Come Dig Me Out" (Teddy Kumpel, Michelle Lewis) – 3:31
3. "Contradiction" – 3:14
4. "Coolhead" – 2:57
5. "Right Here" – 3:30
6. "Shut Up" – 2:47
7. "On the Run" – 2:41
8. "On Your Own" – 3:02
9. "Too Much of You" – 3:07 (Osbourne, Kara DioGuardi, Jonnie Most)
10. "Everything's Alright" – 2:40
11. "More Than Life Itself" – 4:25
12. "Papa Don't Preach" – 3:28 (Brian Elliot, Madonna)

Changes bonus tracks

13. "Dig Me Out" (live) – 3:54
14. "Disconnected" (live) – 4:07
15. "Too Much of You" (live) – 3:34
16. "On the Run" (live) – 4:12
17. "Changes" (with Ozzy Osbourne) – 4:07 (Ozzy Osbourne, Tony Iommi, Geezer Butler, Bill Ward)

== Personnel ==
- Kelly Osbourne – vocals, vocal arrangements
- Chris Goerce – guitar
- Mike "Beans" Benigno – drums
- Marc Russell – bass

=== Production ===
- Thomas R. Yezzi – production
- Marc Russell – production
- Ric Wake – production
- J.D. Andrew – engineering
- Andy Manganello – engineering
- Jim Annunziato – engineering
- Juan Francisco – engineering
- Eric Sanicola – engineering
- Dave Scheuer – engineering
- Thomas R. Yezzi – recording, mixing
- Vladimir Meller – mastering
- Mark Weiss – photography

== Chart positions ==
=== Album ===
Chart (2002–03)	Peak position
Australian Albums (ARIA)	100
Austrian Albums (Ö3 Austria)	56
Finnish Albums (Suomen virallinen lista)	16
German Albums (Offizielle Top 100)	30
Swiss Albums (Schweizer Hitparade)	89
UK Albums (Official Charts)	31
US Billboard 200	101
US Heatseekers Albums (Billboard)	1

=== Singles ===
Year	Single	Chart	Peak position
2002	"Papa Don't Preach"	Australian Singles Chart	3
2002	"Papa Don't Preach"	Finnish Singles Chart	5
2002	"Papa Don't Preach"	UK Singles Chart	3
2003	"Shut Up"	Australian Singles Chart	34
2003	"Shut Up"	Irish Singles Chart	18
2003	"Shut Up"	Norwegian Singles Chart	15
2003	"Shut Up"	UK Singles Chart	12

Year	Single	Chart	Peak position
2003	"Changes" (Felix da Housecat remix)	US Hot Dance Music/Club Play	43
2003	"Changes"	Irish Singles Chart	7
2003	"Changes"	UK Singles Chart	1
