= ¿Por qué no te callas? =

Famous remark by Juan Carlos I to Hugo Chavez

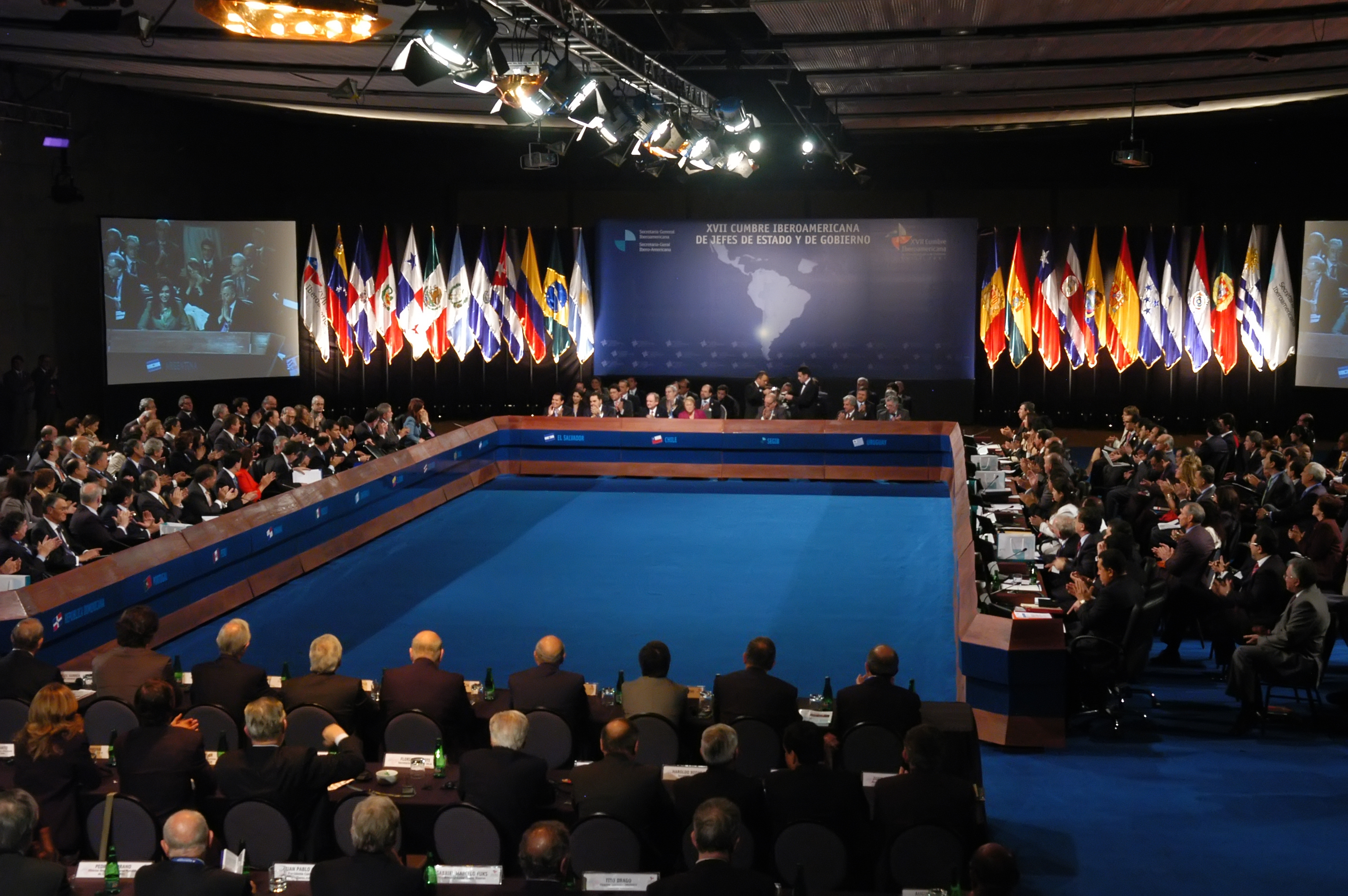
Ibero-American Summit, 2007: Juan Carlos, Zapatero and Chávez are seated on the right side of the chamber. (Chávez is seated at the table in the bottom-right corner clapping.)

Audio clip of the phrase

¿Por qué no te callas? (Spanish: [poɾˈke no te ˈkaʎas]; English: "Why don't you shut up?") is a phrase that was uttered by King Juan Carlos I of Spain to Venezuelan President Hugo Chávez, at the 2007 Ibero-American Summit in Santiago, Chile, when Chávez was repeatedly interrupting Spanish Prime Minister José Luis Rodríguez Zapatero's speech. Following international attention, the phrase became an overnight sensation, gaining cult and meme status as a mobile-phone ringtone, spawning a domain name, a contest, T-shirt sales, a television program and YouTube videos.

== Incident ==
At the meeting on 10 November 2007, Chávez repeatedly interrupted Zapatero to call Zapatero's predecessor, José María Aznar, a "fascist" and "less human than snakes", and accuse Aznar of having supported a failed coup d'état aimed at removing Chávez from power. Zapatero had earlier irritated Chávez by suggesting that Latin America needed to attract more foreign capital to combat its "chronic, deepening poverty", and claimed that Chávez's policies scared investors out of Latin America.

Chávez's attacks became so strong that Zapatero rose to Aznar's defence, even though he had been severely critical of Aznar in the past. Zapatero pointed out that Aznar had been democratically elected and was "a legitimate representative of the Spanish people".

Although organizers switched off Chávez's microphone, he continued to interrupt as Zapatero defended Aznar. Juan Carlos leaned forward, turned towards Chávez, and said, "¿Por qué no te callas?" The King's rebuke received applause from the general audience. He addressed Chávez using the familiar form of "you" (in Latin American Spanish, tú and te are usually used in informal chat, among young people or when addressing close friends, family, or children, and can be perceived as insulting when used in other circumstances. However, in European Spanish the use of "tú" is more extended and considered the standard). Shortly thereafter, he left the hall, as Nicaraguan President Daniel Ortega accused Spain of intervention in his country's elections and complained about the presence of Spanish energy companies in Nicaragua. The incident was unprecedented, as never before had the King displayed such anger in public.

For the King, the incident was part of an annus horribilis for the royal image, according to the Chilean newspaper La Nación. The New York Times argued that the incident exposed "the unendingly complicated relations between Spain and its former colonies".

== Reaction ==
After the events at the summit, Hugo Chávez made statements against King Juan Carlos I, questioning his democratic legitimacy, and whether he knew about and endorsed the attempted coup d'état in Venezuela in 2002. Chávez defended his accusations against Aznar, arguing that prohibiting criticism of an elected official such as Aznar would be similar to prohibiting criticism of Adolf Hitler. He stated that he would revise Venezuela's position towards Spain and increase surveillance of the activities of Spanish companies in Venezuela, where Spain had been the main investor and trade partner in the last decade.

The Spanish government showed appreciation for the reaction of the King and for Zapatero's defense of the dignity of Spanish elected representatives like Aznar.

Several days after the event, Chávez demanded an apology from King Juan Carlos and warned Spain that he would review diplomatic ties and take action against Spanish companies, such as Banco Santander and Banco Bilbao Vizcaya Argentaria, in Venezuela. He accused the King of displaying the kind of Spanish arrogance that led to Spain's ejection from South America at the hands of Venezuela's hero, Simón Bolívar. Spanish diplomats were concerned that Chávez would replace his socialism and attacks on "American imperialism" with attacks on what he called "Spanish imperialism". Speaking about Venezuela's indigenous peoples, Chávez said of the Spanish, "They slit our people's throats and chopped them into little bits and left them on the outskirts of towns and villages – that was what the Spanish empire did here." The Spanish foreign ministry denied that the "¿Por qué no te callas?" incident was indicative of Spanish–Latin American relations. Some analysts say Chávez used such incidents to "fire up his support base among the majority poor at home with blunt language that played on their misgivings of rich countries' investments in Latin America".

According to the Los Angeles Times, it is uncertain which of the two men came out of the incident looking worse: "Chávez for his boorish lack of etiquette", or the King for insulting another leader. The King's words raised questions as the "200th anniversary of independence for the former Spanish colonies" approached. Several days after the incident, Venezuela's state-run television ran footage of Juan Carlos with Francisco Franco. The King was depicted as the dictator's lackey; but the fact that the Spanish Constitution of 1978, which preserved the monarchy, had been approved by a referendum, and the key role played by the King in putting down an attempted military coup in 1981, were not mentioned.

The King's outburst received divided reactions from other leaders. Brazil's President Luiz Inácio Lula da Silva defended Chávez, while Peru's and El Salvador's presidents Alan García and Antonio Saca supported the King.

== Popularity of phrase ==
Zapatero said he did not realize what an influential moment it had been until he returned home and his eldest daughter greeted him with "¿Por qué no te callas?", which made them both laugh.

The King's phrase gained cult slogan status, ringing from mobile phones; appearing on T-shirts; and being used as a greeting. The domain, porquenotecallas.com, had reached US$4,600 on eBay as of 16 November 2007. The phrase became a YouTube sensation overnight and a song was written to a traditional tune. The phrase spawned countless media articles, jokes, songs and video clips, and in Spain an estimated 500,000 people downloaded the phrase as a ringtone, generating €1.5 million (US$2 million) in sales as of November 2007. As of 14 November 2007, Google generated 665,000 webhits on the phrase and YouTube had 610 videos. Entrepreneurs in Florida and Texas put the slogan on T-shirts, and marketed them on eBay and elsewhere; the phrase became a greeting among Venezuelan expats in Miami and Spain and a slogan for Chávez opponents.

Less than 24 hours after the event, the king's words were used by sports commentators during the radio transmission of Spanish language football games to describe controversial events. A contest for the best audiovisual depiction of the event was announced in Spain. The Cincinnati Enquirer editorial page suggested that the phrase would have the power to change the course of history, as has been credited to Ronald Reagan's, "Mr. Gorbachev, tear down this wall!"

The Los Angeles Times said "the Spanish-speaking world can hardly stop talking about [the incident]", which provided "fodder for satirists from Mexico City to Madrid". An editor for the Washington Post noted the "Spanish-speaking world has been abuzz about [this] verbal slapdown" and suggested that King Juan Carlos "should have asked the assembled heads of state: 'Why don't you speak up?'" The reaction was apparent "in newspaper headlines, cable television and on YouTube. His phrase was reproduced on T-shirts, and cellphone ring tones. In Mexico City, the dust-up became a satirical skit, "El Chabo del 8". In El Salvador's capital, the phrase became a playful greeting." In Australia The Sydney Morning Herald reported the King could earn a multimillion-euro business if he claimed rights over the phrase, which generated a Benny Hill Show-style skit and a Nike ad, "Juan do it. Just shut up", with the Brazilian football star, Ronaldinho. Canada's CBC News said an actor's voice was used to mimic the king's voice in the ringtone to avoid legal problems over the use of the phrase, which also generated sales of coffee mugs.

Protesters against the Chávez government adopted the phrase as their slogan; T-shirts in Venezuela had the slogan with the "no" in capital letters, representing a call to vote against amendments in the December 2007 constitutional referendum and the phrase was used as a taunt when more than 100,000 marched in protest against Chávez's proposed constitutional changes.

== Aftermath ==
=== Immediate ===
One week after the event, The Wall Street Journal wrote that King Abdullah of Saudi Arabia delivered Chávez's second rebuke from a king in one week, when he reminded Chávez that oil should not be used as a tool for conflict. The remarks came minutes after Chávez called for OPEC to "assert itself as an active political agent" at the OPEC summit in Saudi Arabia's capital, Riyadh. In a followup at the OPEC summit, Reuters wrote that "Spain's king cannot shut Chavez up but bladder can", and that Chávez said to a throng of reporters at the OPEC summit, "For a while now, I have needed to go to the bathroom and I am going to pee ... Do you want me to pee on you?"

Two weeks after the event, Chile's President Michelle Bachelet revealed that she had politely requested that Chávez abstain from making some statements at the summit, indicating frankly that she felt "let down" by the subsequent discussions at the OPEC meeting, considering the effect that the price of oil has on countries like Chile. Also just weeks after the incident, Chávez was "accused of breaking a protocol accord" with Colombia's President Álvaro Uribe and "exhaust[ing] his Colombian counterpart's patience by speaking out of turn once too often", formally ending Chávez's mediation in hostage negotiations with the Colombian Revolutionary Armed Forces of Colombia (FARC) guerrilla group.

In Argentina, a television program called Por qué no te callas began broadcasting on 6 December 2007.

=== Enduring ===
The phrase was seen at the 2010 FIFA World Cup when a Spanish fan raised a scarf bearing the slogan. In 2013, Infobae named the incident among those most noted to have captured public attention in the history of the Ibero-American Summit. Entorno Inteligente invoked the phrase in 2014, paying homage to Spain for the "immortal lexicon", and referring to Venezuelan politician Nicolás Maduro as in-maduro (a play on the Spanish word immature). A 2020 Spanish newspaper characterized the incident as one of the 20 most memorable televised moments of Juan Carlos.

A 2017 journal paper used the incident as an example of the definition of intensification as a "pragmatic strategy that contributes to the rhetorico–argumentative aspect reinforcing what has been said or the speaker's or somebody else's point of view". A study published in 2019 in the journal Normas about the expression of courtesy in language remarked that neither party had measured the impact their words would have during the summit.

== Alternative forms ==
According to Fundéu BBVA, the Urgent Spanish Foundation, and the director of the Chilean Academy of the Spanish language, the phrase uttered by the King, given the situation under which it was said, should be written with exclamation marks instead of question marks: ¡Por qué no te callas! Alternatively, it could be written using a combination of both exclamation and question marks (the interrobang): ¡¿Por qué no te callas?! or ¿¡Por qué no te callas!?

== See also ==
- Shut up
- Spain–Venezuela relations
- "Will you shut up, man?"
- Guiana Brasileira (meme)
