= Shut Up (Kelly Osbourne song) =

Single by Kelly Osbourne

from the album Shut Up
- Released: 28 October 2002
- Recorded: 2002
- Genre: Pop-punk
- Label: Epic
- Songwriter(s): Kelly Osbourne; Mike Beans Benigno; Chris Goercke; Tom Yezzi; Marc Russell
- Producer(s): PowerPack

Kelly Osbourne singles chronology
| "Papa Don't Preach" (2002) | "Shut Up" (2002) | "Come Dig Me Out" (2003) |

"Shut Up" is the second single released by Kelly Osbourne. It is from her debut album Shut Up. It reached the top 20 of some European charts, but only reached number 34 in Australia. It was not as successful as her debut single, a cover of "Papa Don't Preach" by Madonna.

Reportedly, Kelly wrote the song about her brother Jack Osbourne, and his annoyance of her when she was a child.

== Track listing ==
1. "Shut Up" (album version)
2. "Too Much of You" (album version)
3. "Shut Up" (karaoke version)
4. "Shut Up" (music video)

== Charts ==
| Chart (2003) | Peak position |
|---|---|
| Australia (ARIA) | 34 |
| Austria (Ö3 Austria Top 40) | 38 |
| Denmark (Tracklisten) | 96 |
| Germany (Official German Charts) | 52 |
| Ireland (Irish Singles Chart) | 18 |
| New Zealand (Recorded Music NZ) | 44 |
| Norway (VG-lista) | 15 |
| Sweden (Sverigetopplistan) | 19 |
| Switzerland (Schweizer Hitparade) | 81 |
| UK Singles (Official Charts Company) | 12 |
| UK Rock & Metal Chart (Official Charts Company) | 1 |
