= Shut up =

Command with meaning akin to "be quiet"

A Wiktionary poster adapting Keep Calm and Carry On, encouraging users to contribute rather than getting involved in disputes

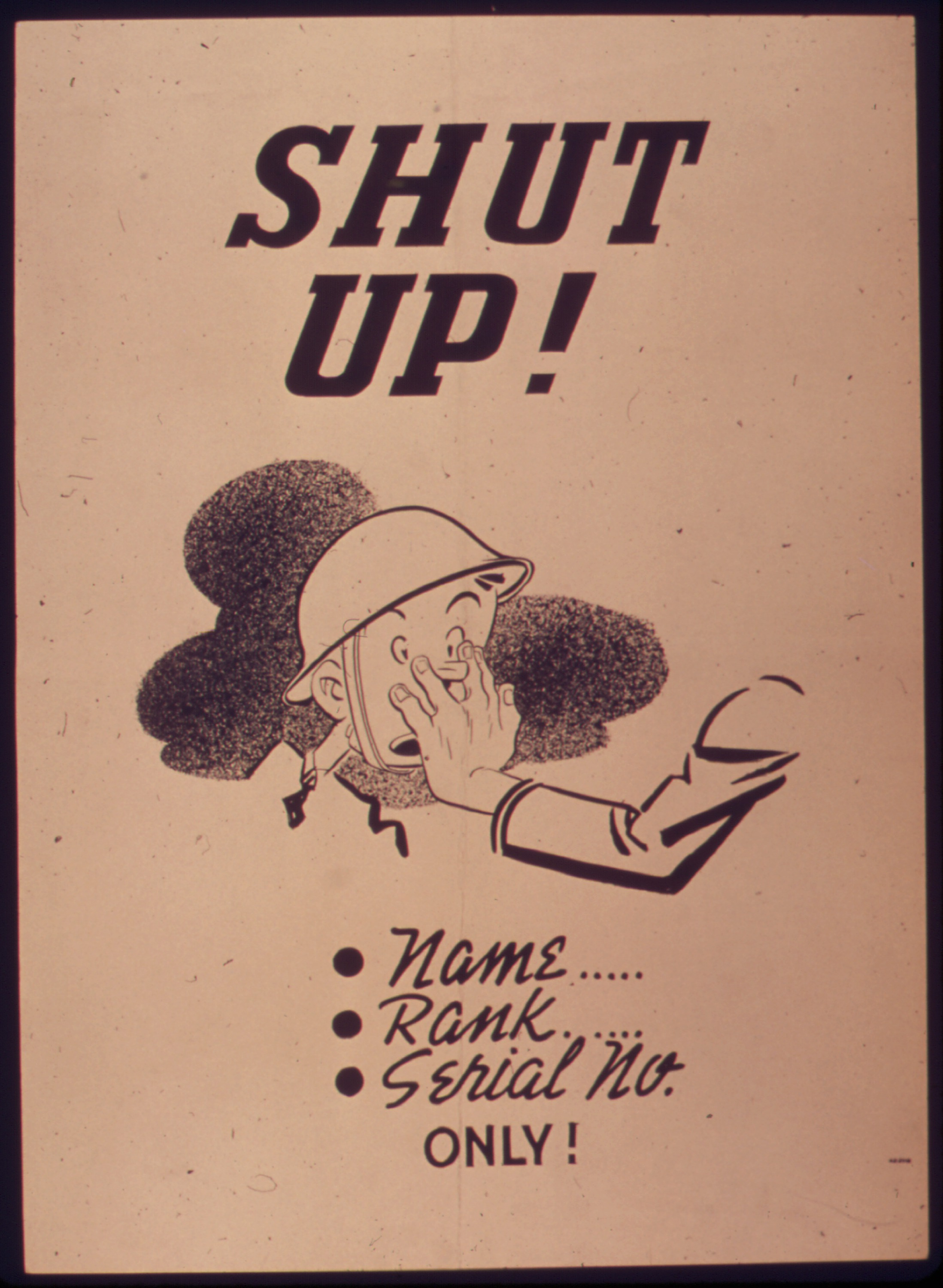
World War II–era United States Army poster instructing soldiers on the information they are obligated to give under the Geneva Conventions if taken as a prisoner of war

"Shut up" is a direct command with a meaning very similar to "be quiet" and "be silent", but which is commonly perceived as a more forceful command to stop making noise or otherwise communicating, such as talking. The phrase is probably a shortened form of "shut up your mouth" or "shut your mouth up". Its use is generally considered rude and impolite, and may also be considered objectionable enough by some to be deemed inappropriate for formal proceedings.

== Initial meaning and development ==
Before the twentieth century, the phrase "shut up" was rarely used as an imperative, and had a different meaning altogether. To say that someone was "shut up" meant that they were locked up, quarantined, or held prisoner. For example, several passages in the King James Version of the Bible instruct that if a priest determines that a person shows certain symptoms of illness, "then the priest shall shut up him that hath the plague of the scall seven days". This meaning was also used in the sense of closing something, such as a business, and it is also from this use that the longer phrase "shut up your mouth" likely originated.

One source has indicated this:

The use of the phrase "shut up" to signify "hold one's tongue" or "compel silence" dates from the sixteenth century. Among the texts that include examples of the phrase "shut up" in this context are Shakespeare's King Lear, Dickens's Little Dorrit, and Kipling's Barrack-Room Ballads.

However, Shakespeare's use of the phrase in King Lear is limited to a reference to the shutting of doors at the end of Scene II, with the characters of Regan and Cornwall both advising the King, "Shut up your doors". The earlier meaning of the phrase, to close something, is widely used in Little Dorrit, but is used in one instance in a manner which foreshadows the modern usage:

'Altro, altro! Not Ri-' Before John Baptist could finish the name, his comrade had got his hand under his chin and fiercely shut up his mouth.

In another instance in that work, the phrase "shut it up" is used to indicate the resolution of a matter:

Now, I'll tell you what it is, and this shuts it up...

The Routledge Dictionary of Historical Slang cites an 1858 lecture on slang as noting that "when a man... holds his peace, he shuts up." As early as 1859, use of the shorter phrase was expressly conveyed in a literary work:

A sneering infidel, who uses Scripture for a jest-book, raves about "cant," and retails and details every inconsistency, real or imaginary, that he hears respecting parsons and hypocrites, will be told to "shut up" for a few times; but will, if he persevere, make an impression on a workshop.

One 1888 source identifies the phrase by its similarity to Shakespeare's use in Much Ado About Nothing of "the Spanish phrase poeat palabrât, 'few words,' which is said to be pretty well the equivalent of our slang phrase 'shut up'". The usage by Rudyard Kipling appears in his poem "The Young British Soldier", published in 1892, told in the voice of a seasoned military veteran who says to the fresh troops, "Now all you recruities what's drafted to-day,/You shut up your rag-box an' 'ark to my lay".

== Variations ==
More forceful and sometimes vulgar forms of the phrase may be constructed by the infixation of modifiers, including "shut the hell up" and "shut the fuck up". In instant messenger communications, these are in turn often abbreviated to STHU and STFU, respectively. In shut the heck up and shut the fudge up, heck or fudge is substituted for the more aggressive modifiers.

Similar phrases include "hush" and "shush" or "hush up" and "shush up" (which are generally less aggressive). Another common variation is "shut your mouth", sometimes substituting "mouth" with another word conveying similar meaning, such as head, face, teeth, trap, yap, chops, crunch, cake-hole (in places including the UK and New Zealand), pie-hole (in the United States), or, more archaically, gob. Another variation, shut it, substitutes "it" for the mouth, leaving the thing to be shut to be understood by implication.

Variations produced by changes in spelling, spacing, or slurring of words include shaddap, shurrup, shurrit, shutup, and shuttup. By derivation, a "shut-up sandwich" is another name for a punch in the mouth. On The King of Queens, Doug Heffernan (the main character played by Kevin James) is known for saying shutty, which is also a variation of the phrase that has since been used by the show's fans.

A dysphemism, shut the front door, was used often by Stacy London of TLC's What Not to Wear during the U.S. show's run from 2003 to 2013. It was also used in an Oreo commercial on American TV in 2011, prompting some commentators to object.

A similar phrase in Spanish, ¿Por qué no te callas? (English: "Why don't you shut up?"), was said by King Juan Carlos I of Spain to Venezuelan president Hugo Chávez, in response to repeated interruptions by Chávez at a 2007 diplomatic conference. The blunt comment from one head of state to another surprised many, and received "general applause" from the audience.

== Objectionability ==
The objectionability of the phrase has varied over time. For example, in 1957, Milwaukee morning radio personality Bob "Coffeehead" Larsen banned the song "Mama Look at Bubu" from his show for its repeated inclusion of the phrase, which Larsen felt would set a bad example for the younger listeners at that hour. In 1968, the use of the phrase on the floor of the Australian Parliament drew a rebuke that "The phrase 'shut up' is not a parliamentary term. The expression is not the type which one should hear in a Parliament".

== Alternative meanings ==
An alternative modern spoken usage is to express disbelief, or even amazement. When this (politer) usage is intended, the phrase is uttered with mild inflexion to express surprise. The phrase is also used in an ironic fashion, when the person demanding the action simultaneously demands that the subject of the command speak, as in "shut up and answer the question". The usage of this phrase for comedic effect traces at least as far back as the 1870s, where the title character of a short farce titled "Piperman's Predicaments" is commanded to "Shut up; and answer plainly". Another seemingly discordant use, tracing back to the 1920s, is the phrase "shut up and kiss me", which typically expresses both impatience and affection.

== See also ==
- Shut your mouth (disambiguation)
- Silence
- Talk to the hand
- ¿Por qué no te callas?
