= List of fashion designers =

This is a list of notable fashion designers sorted by nationality. It includes designers of haute couture and ready-to-wear.

For haute couture only, see the list of grands couturiers. For footwear designers, see the list of footwear designers.

== Afghanistan ==
- Safia Tarzi

== Argentina ==
- Sofia Achaval de Montaigu
- Gustavo Cadile
- Delia Cancela
- Lucio Castro
- Jazmín Chebar
- Alan Faena
- Franc Fernandez
- Ante Garmaz
- Paco Jamandreu
- Roberto Piazza
- Dalila Puzzovio
- Elsa Serrano
- Vanessa Seward
- Aitor Throup
- Pilar Zeta

== Armenia ==
- Emin Bolbolian
- Kevork Shadoyan

== Australia ==
- Prue Acton
- Peter Alexander
- Yeojin Bae
- Jenny Bannister
- Nadia Bartel
- Zara Bate
- Lucas Bowers
- Leigh Bowery
- Linda Britten
- Ray Brown
- Claudia Chan Shaw
- Flora Cheong-Leen
- Susien Chong
- Christopher Chronis
- Sarah-Jane Clarke
- Lorna Jane Clarkson
- Kay Cohen
- Wayne Cooper
- Keri Craig-Lee
- John Crittle
- Perri Cutten
- Liz Davenport
- Rachel Dean
- Collette Dinnigan
- Leona Edmiston
- Pip Edwards
- Christopher Essex
- Nicola Finetti
- Camilla Freeman-Topper
- Frederick Fox
- Camilla Franks
- Karen Gee
- Enid Gilchrist
- Joshua Goot
- Lisa Gorman
- Juli Grbac
- Melanie Greensmith
- Colette Hayman
- Alannah Hill
- Elvie Hill
- Jessie Hill
- Lisa Ho
- Jennifer Hocking
- Bon Hull
- Akira Isogawa
- Linda Jackson
- Peter Jackson
- Beril Jents
- Rebecca Judd
- Storm Keating
- Jenny Kee
- Steven Khalil
- Dion Lee
- Bettina Liano
- Jacob Luppino
- Virginia Martin
- Alice McCall
- Toni Matičevski
- Dannii Minogue
- Peter Morrissey
- Ivy May Pearce
- Alex Perry
- Katie Perry
- Anthony Pittorino
- Anna Plunkett
- Neville Quist
- Tamara Ralph
- Joe Saba
- Luke Sales
- Bruno Schiavi
- Bob Schulz
- Sheila Scotter
- Ann Shoebridge
- Dan Single
- Bianca Spender
- Paula Stafford
- Ruth Tarvydas
- Shona Joy Thatcher
- Donna Ida Thornton
- Sophia Tolli
- Norma Tullo
- Richard Tyler
- Paul Vasileff
- Erica Wardle
- Johanna Weigel
- Bowie Wong
- Carla Zampatti
- Aheda Zanetti
- Gary Zecevic

== Austria ==
- Werner Baldessarini
- Sigmar Berg
- Eva Maria Düringer Cavalli
- Emilie Louise Flöge
- Gertrud Höchsmann
- Nina Hollein
- Emma Jacobsson
- Andreas Kronthaler
- Helmut Lang
- Michael Lanner
- Birgit C. Muller
- Moriz Piffl-Perčević
- Ruth Rogers-Altmann
- Jutta Sika

== Bangladesh ==
- Maheen Khan
- Bibi Russell
- Asma Sultana

== Barbados ==
- Rihanna

== Belarus ==
- Apti Eziev
- Dmitry Sholokhov

== Belgium ==
- Valentine Avoh
- Maggy Baum
- Dirk Bikkembergs
- Veronique Branquinho
- Christophe Coppens
- Tim Coppens
- Jules-François Crahay
- Angele Delanghe
- Ann Demeulemeester
- Honorine Deschrijver
- Désirée zu Hohenlohe-Langenburg
- Cedric Jacquemyn
- Martin Margiela
- Bruno Pieters
- Cathy Pill
- Elvis Pompilio
- Ann Salens
- Raf Simons
- Olivier Strelli
- Olivier Theyskens
- Kaat Tilley
- Jeanne Toussaint
- Kris Van Assche
- Walter Van Beirendonck
- Dries van Noten
- Anthony Vaccarello
- Édouard Vermeulen

== Belize ==
- Rebecca Stirm

== Bolivia ==
- Vanessa Alfaro
- Beatriz Canedo Patiño
- Monica Moss
- Eliana Paco Paredes

== Bosnia ==
- Adnan Hajrulahović (Haad)

== Brazil ==
- Camila Alves
- Zuzu Angel
- Bruno Basso
- Alexandre Birman
- Georgina Brandolini d'Adda
- Barbara Casasola
- Igor Cavalera
- Francisco Costa
- Adriana Degreas
- Tufi Duek
- Alexandre Herchcovitch
- Clodovil Hernandes
- Lorenzo Merlino
- Alessandra Meskita
- Oskar Metsavaht
- Carlos Miele
- Inacio Ribeiro
- Amir Slama
- Iracema Trevisan
- Carlos Tufvesson
- Diego Vanassibara
- Ocimar Versolato

== Bulgaria ==
- Myléna Atanassova
- Viliana Georgieva
- Kiko Kostadinov

== Burma ==
- Ahlatt Lumyang
- Myo Minn Soe
- May Myat Waso
- Steven Oo
- Mogok Pauk Pauk

== Burundi ==
- Cynthia Munwangari

== Cambodia ==
- Eric Raisina

== Cameroon ==
- Imane Ayissi
- Mireille Nemale

== Canada ==
- Atuat Akkitirq
- Marcel B. Aucoin
- Susan Avingaq
- Lida Baday
- Brian Bailey
- Christopher Bates
- Tammy Beauvais
- Tishynah Buffalo
- Nicole Camphaug
- Dean and Dan Caten
- Simon Chang
- Dov Charney
- Edison Chen
- Ian H. Cooper
- Douglas Coupland
- Patrick Cox
- Mario Davignon
- MLMA
- Angela DeMontigny
- Steve Dubbeldam
- Ashley Ebner
- John Fluevog
- Sunny Fong
- Ariel Garten
- Dorothy Grant
- Elora Hardy
- Adrianne Ho
- Rad Hourani
- Bruno Ierullo
- Aurora James
- Tara Jarmon
- Victoria Kakuktinniq
- Lloyd Klein
- Jeremy Laing
- Avril Lavigne
- Edeline Lee
- Devon Halfnight LeFlufy
- Dan Liu
- Charles Lu
- Linda Lundström
- Margeaux
- Liam Massaubi
- Pat McDonagh
- Joe Mimran
- Paul Minichiello
- Erdem Moralıoğlu
- Melaw Nakehk'o
- Mina Napartuk
- Sid Neigum
- Sage Paul
- Marie-Paule Nolin
- Aaju Peter
- Ruth Qaulluaryuk
- Richard Robinson
- Arnold Scaasi
- Céline Semaan Vernon
- Bojana Sentaler
- Kim Smiley
- George Sully
- Alfred Sung
- Luke Tanabe
- Tanya Taylor
- Collin Thompson
- Marion Tuu'luq
- Malorie Urbanovitch
- Liz Vandal
- Rita Vinieris
- Shannon Wilson
- Adrienne Wu
- Jason Wu

== Chad ==
- Benjamin Kirchhoff

== Chile ==
- Maria Cornejo

== China ==
- Edison Chen
- Movana Chen
- Betty Clemo
- Guo Pei
- Grace Chen
- Kenny Ho
- Vivienne Hu
- Ma Ke
- Titi Kwan
- Eddie Lau
- Henry Lau
- Chris Liu
- Lü Yan
- Masha Ma
- Kevin Poon
- Vivienne Poy
- John Rocha
- Ryan LO
- Vivienne Tam
- William Tang
- Angus Tsui
- Oscar Udeshi
- Momo Wang
- Taoray Wang
- Yu Feng
- Lan Yu
- Nellie Yu Roung Ling

== Colombia ==
- Esteban Cortázar
- Silvia Tcherassi

== Croatia ==
- Boris Banović
- Damir Doma
- Žuži Jelinek
- Olja Luetić
- Mandali Mendrilla

== Cuba ==
- Fabiola Arias
- Lisandra Ramos
- Isabel Toledo

== Cyprus ==
- Mustafa Aslanturk
- Hussein Chalayan
- Nicolas Petrou

== Czech Republic ==
- Zika Ascher
- Sidonie Grünwald-Zerkowitz
- Betty Yokova

== Denmark ==
- Malene Birger
- Louise Lyngh Bjerregaard
- Lilly Brændgaard
- Erik Brandt
- Margit Brandt
- Helena Christensen
- Charlotte Eskildsen
- Julie Fagerholt
- Grethe Glad
- Barbara í Gongini
- Liffa Gregoriussen
- Bente Hammer
- Lars Hillingsø
- Peter Ingwersen
- Peter Jensen
- Anne Sofie Madsen
- Bitte Kai Rand
- Louise Sandberg
- Aage Thaarup
- Henrik Vibskov
- Thomas Winkler
- Ole Yde

== Dominican Republic ==
- Sully Bonnelly
- Monica Boyar
- José Durán
- Hernan Lander
- Jenny Polanco
- Jackie Sencion
- Manuel Tarrazo
- Oscar de la Renta

== Ecuador ==
- Roberto de Villacis

== El Salvador ==
- Francesca Miranda

== Estonia ==
- Diana Arno
- Roberta Einer

== Ethiopia ==
- Amsale Aberra
- Fikirte Addis
- Mahlet Afework

== Finland ==
- Antti Asplund
- Sandra Hagelstam
- Katriina Haikala
- Riitta Immonen
- Maija Isola
- Samu-Jussi Koski
- Teuvo Loman
- Vilma Metter
- Vuokko Nurmesniemi
- Mert Otsamo
- Sveta Planman
- Saara

== France ==
=== A-G ===
- Haider Ackermann
- Gaby Aghion
- Madame Agnès
- Gérard Albouy
- Mademoiselle Alexandre
- Joseph Altuzarra
- Jérémy Amelin
- Adeline André
- Christian Audigier
- Augustabernard (Augusta Bernard)
- Dominique Aurientis
- Loris Azzaro
- agnès b.
- Vitaldi & Maurice Babani
- Pierre Balmain
- Jean Barthet
- Anne Marie Beretta
- Le Sieur Beaulard
- Rose Bertin
- Marc Bohan
- Vera Borea
- Coco Brandolini d'Adda
- Vanessa Bruno
- Marie-Louise Bruyère
- Herminie Cadolle
- Serge Cajfinger
- Callot Soeurs
- Émile Camuset
- Pierre Cardin
- Marie-Louise Carven
- Jean-Charles de Castelbajac
- Louis-Marie de Castelbajac
- Coco Chanel
- Christofle Charvet
- Marcelle Chaumont
- Louise Chéruit
- Robert Clergerie
- Marie-Françoise Corot
- André Courrèges
- Jeanne Damas
- Christophe Decarnin
- Zahia Dehar
- Jean Dessès
- Kostio de War
- Rehane Yavar Dhala
- Mohamed Dia
- Christian Dior
- Georges Doeuillet
- Marcelle Dormoy
- Jacques Doucet
- Marie Madeleine Duchapt
- Pierre-Alexis Dumas
- Madame Eloffe
- Benoît-Pierre Emery
- Nicole Farhi
- Jacques Fath
- Louis Féraud
- Anne Fontaine
- Julien Fournié
- Inès de La Fressange
- Maud Frizon
- Jean Paul Gaultier
- Katell Gélébart
- Nicolas Ghesquière
- Hubert de Givenchy
- Michel Goma
- Madame Grès
- Jacques Griffe
- Jacques Guarrigue-Lefèvre

=== H-N ===
- Sophie Habsburg
- Pierre Hardy
- Anne Valérie Hash
- Daniel Hechter
- Jacques Heim
- Madame Herbault
- Simon Porte Jacquemus
- Bouchra Jarrar
- Christophe Josse
- Charles Jourdan
- Philip Karto
- Emmanuelle Khanh
- Michel Klein
- Romain Kremer
- Bernard Lacoste
- René Lacoste
- Christian Lacroix
- Madeleine Laferrière
- Frédéric Luca Landi
- Jeanne Lanvin
- Ted Lapidus
- Guy Laroche
- Alexis Lavigne
- Françoise Leclerc
- Germaine Lecomte
- Lucien Lelong
- Lolita Lempicka
- Hervé Leroux
- Louis Hippolyte Leroy
- Julie de Libran
- Christian Louboutin
- Serge Lutens
- Alexis Mabille
- Catherine Malandrino
- Alain Manoukian
- Isabel Marant
- Léo Marciano
- Maripol
- Alexandre Mattiussi
- Natacha Marro
- Paul Mausner
- Frank Mechaly
- Sophie Mechaly
- Rodolphe Menudier
- Sébastien Meunier
- Simone Mirman
- Caroline Montagne Roux
- Claude Montana
- Gilles Montezin
- Roland Mouret
- Thierry Mugler
- Henriette Negrin

=== O-Z ===
- Andre Oliver
- Mademoiselle Pagelle
- Madame Palmyre
- Jeanne Paquin
- Jean Patou
- Mr Pearl
- Lucien Pellat-Finet
- André Perugia
- Phoebe Philo
- Christine Phung
- Paloma Picasso
- Hervé Pierre
- Robert Piguet
- Octavio Pizarro
- Paul Poiret
- Lola Prusac
- Louis Réard
- Caroline Reboux
- Jane Régny
- Cécile Reinaud
- Rose Repetto
- Julia Restoin Roitfeld
- Jacqueline de Ribes
- Nina Ricci
- Marcel Rochas
- Stéphane Rolland
- Michèle Rosier
- Maggy Rouff
- Olivier Rousteing
- Francois Russo
- Sonia Rykiel
- Jenny Sacerdote
- Claude Saint-Cyr
- Hélène de Saint Lager
- Yves Saint Laurent
- Jean-Louis Scherrer
- Marine Serre
- Maxime Simoëns
- Dominique Sirop
- Martine Sitbon
- Hedi Slimane
- Ginette Spanier
- Franck Sorbier
- Sophie Theallet
- Éric Tibusch
- Dina Tiktiner Viterbo
- Dominic Toubeix
- Ramdane Touhami
- Emanuel Ungaro
- Nadège Vanhee-Cybulski
- Alexandre Vauthier
- Philippe Venet
- Virginie Viard
- Madame Victorine
- Madame Vignon
- Madeleine Vionnet
- Madame Virot
- Roger Vivier
- Louis Vuitton
- Yiqing Yin
- Madame Yteb

== Georgia ==
- Ekaterine Abuladze
- Anouki Areshidze
- Avtandil
- Bessarion
- Lako Bukia
- Keti Chkhikvadze
- Teona Gardapkhadze
- Demna Gvasalia
- Ria Keburia
- David Koma
- Keto Mikeladze
- Aka Nanitashvili
- Irakli Nasidze
- Tatuna Nikolaishvili
- Irina Shabayeva
- Tamar and Natasha Surguladze

== Germany ==
- Torsten Amft
- Iris von Arnim
- Melitta Baumeister
- Barbara Becker
- Gunda Beeg
- Anna Ben-Yusuf
- Maria Bogner
- Willy Bogner, Sr.
- Willy Bogner, Jr.
- Hugo Boss
- Gregor Clemens
- Adolf Dassler
- Rudolf Dassler
- Barbara Engel
- Susanne Erichsen
- Robert Geller
- Harald Glööckler
- Anja Gockel
- Eva Gronbach
- Otto Ludwig Haas-Heye
- Uli Herzner
- Mafalda von Hessen
- Claudia Hill
- Wolfgang Joop
- Heidi Klum
- Guido Maria Kretschmer
- Karl Lagerfeld
- Frank Leder
- Rolf Leeser
- Sonja de Lennart
- Margaretha Ley
- Markus Lupfer
- Georg Lux
- Tomas Maier
- Maria May
- Michael Michalsky
- Rudolph Moshammer
- Anna Muthesius
- Heinz Oestergaard
- Leyla Piedayesh
- Philipp Plein
- Christian Roth
- Boris Bidjan Saberi
- Jil Sander
- Claudia Schiffer
- Wiebke Siem
- Alex Stenzel
- Stefan Szczesny
- Gerhard Weber
- Bernhard Willhelm
- Tilmann Wröbel
- Noah Wunsch

== Ghana ==
- Joyce Ababio
- Tetteh Adzedu
- Kofi Ansah
- Chloe Asaam
- Aisha Ayensu
- Kwaku Bediako
- Ophelia Crossland
- Cecil Duddley Mends
- Kofi Okyere Darko
- Kabutey and Sumaiya Dzietror
- Afua Sam
- Mabel Simpson
- Abena Takyiwa
- Maame Esi Acquah Taylor
- Sally Torpey
- Nana Kwasi Wiafe

== Greece ==
- Christos Costarellos
- Kiki Divaris
- Yiannis Evangelides
- Celia Kritharioti
- Eleni Kyriacou
- Panos Papadopoulos
- Sakis Rouvas
- Yiannis Tseklenis
- Sotirios Voulgaris

== Haiti ==
- Regine Chevallier
- Azède Jean-Pierre

== Hungary ==
- Etienne Aigner
- Zoltán Herczeg
- Mariska Karasz
- Emeric Partos
- Katalin zu Windisch-Graetz

== Iceland ==
- Guðmundur Jörundsson
- Sruli Recht
- Steinunn Sigurðardóttir

== India ==
=== A-L ===
- Anaita Shroff Adajania
- Erum Ali
- Muzaffar Ali
- Manish Arora
- Bhanu Athaiya
- Rohit Bal
- Nachiket Barve
- Maxima Basu
- Ritu Beri
- Sangeeta Boochra
- Aparna Chandra
- Troy Costa
- Joy Crizildaa
- Lalit Dalmia
- Ruma Devi
- Rina Dhaka
- Rehane Yavar Dhala
- Anita Dongre
- James Ferreira
- Prasantt Ghosh
- Surily Goel
- Masaba Gupta
- Omi Gurung
- Poornima Indrajith
- Indrans
- Dolly Jain
- Madhu Jain
- Payal Jain
- Anand Jon
- Beena Kannan
- Alvira Khan Agnihotri
- Gauri Khan
- Naeem Khan
- Sussanne Khan
- Anamika Khanna
- Radhika Khanna
- Manoviraj Khosla
- Rohit Khosla
- Sandeep Khosla
- Archana Kochhar
- Ritu Kumar
- Neeta Lulla
- Riya Kodali

=== M-Z ===
- Nandita Mahtani
- Manish Malhotra
- Asmita Marwa
- Rahul Mishra
- Ayushman Mitra
- Anju Modi
- Bibhu Mohapatra
- Lucky Morani
- Sabyasachi Mukherjee
- Robert Naorem
- Aki Narula
- Shaina NC
- Deepali Noor
- Ruchika Pandey
- Agnimitra Paul
- Vikram Phadnis
- Pernia Qureshi
- Malvika Raj
- Amritha Ram
- Poornima Ramaswamy
- Raghavendra Rathore
- Rocky Star
- Wendell Rodricks
- S.B. Satheeshan
- Esha Sethi Thirani
- Kalpana Shah
- Komal Shahani
- Jishad Shamsudeen
- Barkha Sharma
- Sheetal Sharma
- Suvigya Sharma
- Reza Shariffi
- Mana Shetty
- Anaita Shroff Adajania
- Satish Sikha
- Anna Singh
- Govind Kumar Singh
- Leena Singh
- Rajesh Pratap Singh
- Sameera Saneesh
- Sonakshi Sinha
- Sidney Sladen
- Nalini Sriram
- Tarun Tahiliani
- Sakhi Thomas
- JJ Valaya
- Anu Vardhan
- Suneet Varma
- Varsha Wadhwa
- Maral Yazarloo
- Nidhi Yasha

== Indonesia ==
- Anne Avantie
- Asha Smara Darra
- Ardistia Dwiasri
- Sebastian Gunawan
- Peggy Hartanto
- Anniesa Hasibuan
- Didit Hediprasetyo
- Yovita Meta
- Obin (Josephine Komara)
- Susanna Perini
- Tex Saverio
- Vicky Shu
- Auguste Soesastro
- Heaven Tanudiredja
- Iwan Tirta
- Biyan Wanaatmadja

== Iran ==
- Farnaz Abdoli
- Ray Aghayan
- Haman Alimardani
- Pegah Anvarian
- Bijan (Bijan Pakzad)
- Cleopatra Broumand
- Paria Farzaneh
- Mimi Fayazi
- Shirin Guild
- Keyvan Khosrovani
- Arefeh Mansouri
- Sareh Nouri
- Maral Yazarloo
- Mahla Zamani

== Iraq ==
- Reem Alasadi
- Hana Sadiq
- Tamara Salman
- Salim al-Shimiri
- Zeena Zaki

== Ireland ==
- Sinéad Burke
- John Cavanagh
- Pauline Clotworthy
- Sybil Connolly
- Paul Costelloe
- Pat Crowley
- Michael Donnellan
- Irene Gilbert
- Daphne Guinness
- Daniel Kearns
- Louise Kennedy
- Lainey Keogh
- Daryl Kerrigan
- Orla Kiely
- Richard Malone
- Miriam Mone
- Digby Morton
- Neillí Mulcahy
- Don O'Neill
- Jacqueline Quinn
- Simone Rocha
- Ciaran Sweeney
- Pauric Sweeney
- Philip Treacy
- Sharon Wauchob

== Israel ==
- Yigal Azrouël
- Berta Balliti
- Maya Bash
- Lola Beer Ebner
- Rinat Brodach
- Ronen Chen
- Inbal Dror
- Alber Elbaz
- Adi Gil
- Lea Gottlieb
- Ronen Jehezkel
- Hila Klein
- Galia Lahav
- Alon Livne
- Nili Lotan
- Danit Peleg
- Noa Raviv
- Yotam Solomon
- Elie Tahari
- Pnina Tornai
- Ruti Zisser

== Italy ==
=== A-E ===
- Loris Abate
- Edina Altara
- Maria Antonelli
- Giorgio Armani
- Renato Balestra
- Rocco Barocco
- Sara Battaglia
- Luisa Beccaria
- Laura Biagiotti
- Marzia Bisognin
- Lucilla Bonaccorsi
- Elvira Leonardi Bouyeure
- Giuliana Camerino
- Rene Caovilla
- Ennio Capasa
- Roberto Capucci
- Domenico Caraceni
- Consuelo Castiglioni
- Orsola de Castro
- Roberto Cavalli
- Emilio Cavallini
- Nino Cerruti
- Marco Coretti
- Corneliani
- Ugo Correani
- Enrico Coveri
- Lydia de Crescenzo
- Brunello Cucinelli
- Antonio D'Amico
- Alessandro Dell'Acqua
- Mariano Di Vaio
- Domenico Dolce
- José Eisenberg

=== F-M ===
- Alessandra Facchinetti
- Anna Fendi
- Ilaria Venturini Fendi
- James Ferragamo
- Salvatore Ferragamo
- Wanda Ferragamo
- Gianfranco Ferré
- Alberta Ferretti
- Marta Ferri
- Elio Fiorucci
- Giovanna Fontana
- Graziella Fontana
- Micol Fontana
- Zoe Fontana
- Nicola Formichetti
- Mariano Fortuny
- Virginia von Fürstenberg
- Stefano Gabbana
- Irene Galitzine
- Maria Monaci Gallenga
- Fernanda Gattinoni
- Rosa Genoni
- Giancarlo Giammetti
- Frida Giannini
- Romeo Gigli
- Massimiliano Giornetti
- Gisella Giovenco
- Adriano Goldschmied
- Maria Grazia Chiuri
- Olga di Grésy
- Aldo Gucci
- Guccio Gucci
- Paolo Gucci
- Domitilla Harding
- Rossella Jardini
- Stella Jean
- Max Kibardin
- Marzia Kjellberg
- Agostino Lanfranchi
- André Laug
- Angelo Litrico
- Gianfranco Lotti
- Bruno Magli
- Mariuccia Mandelli
- Achille Maramotti
- Valeria Marini
- Alviero Martini
- Germana Marucelli
- Roberto Faraone Mennella
- Alessandro Michele
- Angela Missoni
- Margherita Missoni
- Ottavio Missoni
- Anna Molinari
- Franco Moschino

=== N-Z ===
- Massimo Osti
- Cesare Paciotti
- Pietro Loro Piana
- Pierpaolo Piccioli
- Stefano Pilati
- Mario Prada
- Miuccia Prada
- Alby Sabrina Pretto
- Emilio Pucci
- Rose Repetto
- Eva Rorandelli
- Sergio Rossi
- Renzo Rosso
- Francesco Rulli
- Fausto Sarli
- Alessandro Sartori
- Andrea Sassetti
- Elsa Schiaparelli
- Mila Schön
- Emilio Schuberth
- Francesco Smalto
- Luciano Soprani
- Simonetta Stefanelli
- Sergio Tacchini
- Jamal Taslaq
- Thayaht
- Anne Tirocchi
- Laura Tirocchi
- Riccardo Tisci
- Nicola Trussardi
- Valentino
- Giambattista Valli
- Jole Veneziani
- Giancarlo Venturini
- Donatella Versace
- Gianni Versace
- Lucila Mara de Vescovi Whitman
- Fabrizio Viti
- Marco Zanini
- Giuseppe Zanotti
- Ermenegildo Zegna
- Italo Zucchelli

== Ivory Coast ==
- O'Plérou Grebet
- Loza Maléombho

== Japan ==
- Chitose Abe
- Sara Arai
- Jun Ashida
- Tae Ashida
- Chiaki
- Tsumori Chisato
- Tsuyoshi Domoto
- Limi Feu
- Hiroshi Fujiwara
- Sayo Hayakawa
- Nobuki Hizume
- Eiko Ishioka
- Masato Jones
- Uno Kanda
- Rei Kawakubo
- Kenzō
- Takeo Kikuchi
- Wakako Kishimoto
- Kiyoharu
- Mako Kojima
- Satoshi Kondo
- Yoshiyuki Konishi
- Michiko Koshino
- Mana
- Eri Matsui
- Meg
- Akina Minami
- Issey Miyake
- Sarah Miyazawa LaFleur
- Hanae Mori
- Tomoaki Nagao
- Kiyoharu Mori
- Tayuka Nakanishi
- Hirooko Naoto
- Nigo
- Jotaro Saito
- Mariko Shinoda
- Tadashi Shoji
- Daiki Suzuki
- Jun Takahashi
- Novala Takemoto
- Akira Takeuchi
- Junya Tashiro
- Noritaka Tatehana
- Kosuke Tsumura
- Charles Tsunashima
- Aya Ueto
- Chinatsu Wakatsuki
- Junya Watanabe
- Naomi Watanabe
- Sayoko Yamaguchi
- Kansai Yamamoto
- Yohji Yamamoto
- Yoshiki
- Sugino Yoshiko
- Junko Yoshioka

== Jordan ==
- Zeid Hijazi
- Amina Muaddi

== Kosovo ==
- Dejzi
- Lirika Matoshi
- Teuta Matoshi

== Kuwait ==
- Ascia AKF
- Nejoud Boodai

== Latvia ==
- Gints Bude
- Olga Peterson
- Katya Shehurina

== Lebanon ==
- Reem Acra
- Huguette Caland
- Georges Chakra
- Sonia Fares
- Nour Hage
- Georges Hobeika
- Nicolas Jebran
- Rabih Kayrouz
- Abed Mahfouz
- Sandra Mansour
- Cynthia Merhej
- Zuhair Murad
- Robert Abi Nader
- Elie Saab
- Nemer Saade
- Gaby Saliba
- Basil Soda
- Tony Ward

== Lithuania ==
- Lena Himmelstein
- Stanislovas Jančiukas
- Zita Kreivytė

== Malawi ==
- Lily Alfonso
- Lillian Koreia
- Vanessa Nsona

== Malaysia ==
- Shila Amzah
- Bernard Chandran
- Jimmy Choo
- Farah Khan
- Rena Koh
- Beatrice Looi
- Melinda Looi
- Richard Rivalee
- Rupert Sanderson
- Edmund Ser
- Nor Aini Shariff

== Mali ==
- Malamine Koné
- Lamine Badian Kouyaté
- Chris Seydou

== Mauritius ==
- Yuvna Kim

== Mexico ==
- Christian Cota
- Ricardo Covalin
- Manuel Cuevas
- Carla Fernández
- Dolores Gonzales
- Eduardo Lucero
- Raul Melgoza
- Mario Moya
- Luz Pavon
- Cristina Pineda
- John Saldivar
- Bárbara Sánchez-Kane
- José María Torre
- Ximena Valero

== Morocco ==
- Joseph Ettedgui
- Paul Marciano

== Nepal ==
- Shail Upadhya
- Prabal Gurung

== Netherlands ==
- Sharon den Adel
- Koos Van Den Akker
- Laila Aziz
- Martyn Bal
- Wilbert Das
- Marlies Dekkers
- Dominique van Dijk
- Sergio van Dijk
- Pauline van Dongen
- Catta Donkersloot
- Lidewij Edelkoort
- Kurt Elshot
- Camiel Fortgens
- Olcay Gulsen
- Michael van der Ham
- Monique van Heist
- Iris van Herpen
- Nick van Hofwegen
- Viktor Horsting
- Percy Irausquin
- Ronald van der Kemp
- Marijke Koger
- Bas Kosters
- Addy van den Krommenacker
- Christian Lagerwaard
- Josje Leeger
- Fong Leng
- Frans Molenaar
- Annelies Nuy
- Marvin Oduber
- Sanae Orchi
- Simon Posthuma
- Alexander van Slobbe
- Rolf Snoeren
- Jan Taminiau
- Josephus Thimister
- Marly van der Velden
- Babette Venderbos
- Mart Visser
- Edgar Vos
- Sascha Warmenhoven
- Sven Westendorp
- Angelique Westerhof

== New Zealand ==
- Margo Barton
- Annie Bonza
- Fanny Buss
- Trelise Cooper
- Kristine Crabb
- Liz Findlay
- Judy Gao
- Trish Gregory
- Malcolm Harrison
- Anouska Hempel
- Susan Holmes
- Kerrie Hughes
- Emma Knuckey
- Denise L'Estrange-Corbet
- Candy Lane
- Lindah Lepou
- Vinka Lucas
- Flora MacKenzie
- Konstantina Moutos
- Bruce Papas
- Doris de Pont
- Sally Ridge
- Margi Robertson
- Kate Sylvester
- Joan Talbot
- Rebecca Taylor
- Karen Walker
- Emilia Wickstead

== Niger ==
- Alphadi (Seidnally Sidhamed)

== Nigeria ==
- Omoyemi Akerele
- Folorunsho Alakija
- Asi Archibong-Arikpo
- Mai Atafo
- Ituen Basi
- Folake Coker
- Lanre da Silva
- Maryam Elisha
- Lisa Folawiyo
- Reni Folawiyo
- Yeni Kuti
- Muma Gee
- Dumebi Iyamah
- Adejoke Lasisi
- Ugo Mozie
- Isoken Ogiemwonyi
- Mowalola Ogunlesi
- Og Okonkwo
- Duro Olowu
- Amaka Osakwe
- Yemi Osunkoya
- Deola Sagoe
- Sasha P
- Sexy Steel
- Ejiro Amos Tafiri
- Shade Thomas-Fahm
- Patience Torlowei
- Wavy the Creator

== North Macedonia ==
- Risto Bimbiloski
- Nikola Eftimov
- Marjan Pejoski

== Norway ==
- Kristian Aadnevik
- Anne Helene Gjelstad
- Fam Irvoll
- William Duborgh Jensen
- Andreas Melbostad
- Gunhild Nygaard
- Pontine Paus
- Julie Skarland
- Per Spook

== Pakistan ==
- Vaneeza Ahmad
- Aijaz Aslam
- Mehmood Bhatti
- Zainab Chottani
- Sarah Gandapur
- Nadia Hussain
- Junaid Jamshed
- Maheen Khan
- Sadaf Malaterre
- Omar Mansoor
- Sania Maskatiya
- Deepak Perwani
- Kamiar Rokni
- Wardha Saleem
- Shamoon Sultan
- Hassan Sheheryar Yasin

== Palestine ==
- Nadya Hazboun
- Rami Kashou
- Shukri Lawrence
- Yasmeen Mjalli
- Jamal Taslaq

== Panama ==
- Federico Visuetti

== Papua New Guinea ==
- Sarah Haoda Todd

== Peru ==
- Mocha Graña
- Alessandra de Osma

== Philippines ==
- Leo Almodal
- Harvey Cenit
- Michael Cinco
- Ito Curata
- Mich Dulce
- Christian Espiritu
- Ben Farrales
- Rian Fernandez
- Jasper Garvida
- Sassa Jimenez
- Monique Lhuillier
- Imelda Marcos
- Lesley Mobo
- Pitoy Moreno
- Furne One
- Puey Quiñones
- Cary Santiago
- Andre Soriano
- Inno Sotto
- Philipp Tampus
- Rosenthal Tee
- Kermit Tesoro
- Mak Tumang
- Ramón Valera

== Poland ==
- Roma Gąsiorowska
- Joanna Horodyńska
- Barbara Hulanicki
- Monika Jaruzelska
- Michael Maximilian
- Ewa Minge
- Anna Potok
- Henri Strzelecki
- Aleksandra Szwed
- Dawid Tomaszewski
- Dawid Woliński
- Xymena Zaniewska-Chwedczuk
- Maciej Zien
- Karolina Zmarlak

== Portugal ==
- Paulo Almeida
- Felipe Oliveira Baptista
- Luís Buchinho
- Fátima Lopes
- Marta Marques
- Isilda Pelicano
- Ricardo Preto

== Puerto Rico ==
- Carlota Alfaro
- Franco Lacosta
- Nono Maldonado
- Lisa Thon

== Romania ==
- Ioana Ciolacu
- Maria Lucia Hohan
- Amina Muaddi
- Narcisa Pheres
- Irina Schrotter
- Joseph Seroussi
- Ben Zuckerman

== Russia ==
- Aslan Ahmadov
- Olga Bulbenkova
- Erté
- Angela Donhauser
- Oxana Fedorova
- Irina Fedotova
- Sultanna Frantsuzova
- Natalia Goncharova
- Irina Khakamada
- Nadezhda Lamanova
- Katya Lee
- Ekaterina Malysheva
- Leon Max
- Jana Nedzvetskaya
- Kira Plastinina
- Alexandre Plokhov
- Nicolas Putvinski
- Gosha Rubchinskiy
- Ulyana Sergeenko
- Denis Simachev
- Alexey Sorokin
- Natalia Valevskaya
- Helen Yarmak
- Valentin Yudashkin
- Vyacheslav Zaitsev
- Dasha Zhukova

== Rwanda ==
- Sonia Mugabo

== Saudi Arabia ==
- Adnan Akbar
- Yahya Al Bishri
- Amina Al Jassim
- Eman AlAjlan

== Senegal ==
- Papis Loveday
- Oumou Sy

== Serbia ==
- Mihalo Anusic
- Jelena Behrend
- Melina Džinović
- Roksanda Ilincic
- Nevena Ivanović
- Ines Janković
- Sara Jovanović
- Sonja Jocić
- Nikolija Jovanović
- Jelena Karleuša
- Bernat Klein
- Darko Kostić
- Ana Kraš
- Aleksandra Lalić
- Ana Ljubinković
- Zvonko Marković
- Marijana Matthäus
- Evica Milovanov-Penezic
- Boris Nikolić
- Ivana Pilja
- Aleksandar Protić
- Ana Rajcevic
- Verica Rakocević
- Gorjana Reidel
- Ana Šekularac
- Ivana Sert
- Bata Spasojević
- George Styler

== Singapore ==
- Elim Chew
- Ashley Isham
- Hayden Ng
- Benny Ong
- Priscilla Shunmugam

== Slovakia ==
- Lubica Kucerova

== Somalia ==
- Iman

== South Africa ==
- Errol Arendz
- Marc Bouwer
- Gert-Johan Coetzee
- Kara Janx
- Abigail Keats
- Thebe Magugu
- Nkhensani Manganyi Nkosi
- Enhle Mbali Mlotshwa
- Palesa Mokubung
- Mpura
- Laduma Ngxokolo
- Simon Rademan
- Gavin Rajah
- David Rosen
- Albertus Swanepoel
- David Tlale
- Hendrik Vermeulen

== South Korea ==
- André Kim
- Lie Sang-Bong
- MLMA
- Sang A Im-Propp
- Minju Kim
- Rejina Pyo
- Lea Seong
- Lee Young-hee
- Young-mi Woo

== Spain ==
- Sita Abellán
- Miguel Adrover
- Estrella Archs
- Amaya Arzuaga
- Cristóbal Balenciaga
- Maria Barros
- Armand Basi
- Elena Benarroch
- Vicky Martín Berrocal
- Elio Berhanyer
- Manolo Blahnik
- Custo Dalmau
- Adolfo Domínguez
- Tiziana Domínguez
- Ana González
- Gala Gonzalez
- Pedro del Hierro
- Ana Locking
- Pura Lopez
- Rosalía Mera
- Manuel Mota
- Sita Murt
- Lluís Juste de Nin
- Elisa Palomino
- Manuel Pertegaz
- Jesús del Pozo
- Paco Rabanne
- Ágatha Ruiz de la Prada
- Andrés Sardá Sacristán
- Felipe Varela
- Domingo Zapata

== Sri Lanka ==
- Nayana Karunaratne
- Ramzi Rahaman
- Ashcharya Peiris
- Ruchira Silva
- Anuradha Yahampath

== Sweden ==
- Valerie Aflalo
- Erika Aittamaa
- Efva Attling
- Moki Cherry
- Amanda Christensen
- Malinda Damgaard
- Agneta Eckemyr
- Martis Karin Ersdotter
- Emy Fick
- Elisabeth Glantzberg
- Maja Gunn
- Yvette Hass
- Jenny Hellström
- Sighsten Herrgård
- Per Holknekt
- Ann-Sofie Johansson
- Jonny Johansson
- Katja of Sweden (Karin Hallberg)
- Filippa Knutsson
- Hanna Lindberg
- Johan Lindeberg
- Carolina Lindström
- Augusta Lundin
- Lars Nilsson
- Gunilla Pontén
- Rebecca Simonsson
- Gudrun Sjödén
- Bea Szenfeld
- Camilla Thulin
- Lars Wallin
- Lars-Åke Wilhelmsson

== Switzerland ==
- Marianne Alvoni
- BillyBoy*
- Keren Craig
- Egon von Fürstenberg
- Gaby Jouval
- Albert Kriemler
- Stefi Talman

== Syria ==
- Rami Al Ali
- Manal Ajaj
- Odette Barsa
- Nabil El-Nayal

== Taiwan ==
- Malan Breton
- Wenlan Chia
- Justin Chou
- David Chu
- Stephen Dou and Chang Lee Yu-Ching
- Apu Jan
- Michelle Liu
- Yupeng Shih
- Jolin Tsai
- Wang Chen Tsai-Hsia
- Yu Lun Eve Lin

== Tanzania ==
- Mustafa Hassanali
- Ally Rehmtullah

== Thailand ==
- Polpat Asavaprapha
- Busardi Muntarbhorn
- Tuck Muntarbhorn
- Sirivannavari Nariratana
- Thai Nguyen
- Thakoon Panichgul
- Pimdao Sukhahuta

== Togo ==
- Donaldson Sackey

== Trinidad and Tobago ==
- Anya Ayoung-Chee

== Tunisia ==
- Azzedine Alaïa
- Max Azria

== Turkey ==
- Yasemin Akat
- Bora Aksu
- Hanife Çetiner
- Ece Ege
- Dilara Fındıkoğlu
- Cem Hakko
- Cemil İpekçi
- Atıl Kutoğlu
- Rifat Ozbek
- Barbaros Şansal
- Ece Sükan
- Nur Yerlitaş

== Uganda ==
- Titus Brian Ahumuza
- Santa Anzo
- Stella Atal
- Anita Beryl
- Abbas Kaijuka
- Housen Mushema
- Sylvia Owori
- Rubanda-Mayonza

== Ukraine ==
- Maryna Asauliuk
- Lubov Azria
- Irina Belotelkin
- Victoria Gres
- Vita Kin
- Anna Kolomoiets
- Ekaterina Kukhareva
- Nadia Meiher
- Sonya Monina
- Serhii and Oleg Petrov
- Yuliya Polishchuk
- Tetyana Ramus
- Vladymyr Podolyan
- Mikhail Voronin
- Natasha Zinko

== United Arab Emirates ==
- Tamara Al-Gabbani
- Rahil Hesan
- Khalid bin Sultan Al Qasimi
- Mona al Mansouri

== United Kingdom ==
=== England ===
==== A-C ====
- Walé Adeyemi
- Alex da Kid
- Charlie Allen
- Hardy Amies
- Alexander Amosu
- Jonathan Anderson
- Murray Arbeid
- Kazna Asker
- Gary Aspden
- Jacques Azagury
- Christopher Bailey
- Jon Baker
- Maureen Baker
- William Baker
- Sheridan Barnett
- Neil Barrett
- Luella Bartley
- John Bates
- Victoria Beckham
- Ruqsana Begum
- Mary Ann Bell
- Beatrice Bellini
- Linda Bennett
- Judy Bentinck
- Antonio Berardi
- Sara Berman
- Mary Bettans
- Celia Birtwell
- Ozwald Boateng
- David Bond
- Lauren Bowker
- Moya Bowler
- Carlo Brandelli
- Christopher Brooke
- Felicity Brown
- Sheilagh Brown
- Thomas Burberry
- Sarah Burton
- Serena Bute
- Kiki Byrne
- Nigel Cabourn
- Antonia Campbell-Hughes
- Nichole de Carle
- Jane Carr
- Robert Cary-Williams
- Charlie Casely-Hayford
- Joe Casely-Hayford
- Caroline Castigliano
- Richard Cawley
- Elspeth Champcommunal
- Georgina Chapman
- Caroline Charles
- Sandra Choi
- Alexa Chung
- Lindka Cierach
- Julia Clancey
- Ossie Clark
- Gordon Luke Clarke
- Catherine Clavering
- Suzanne Clements
- Sue Clowes
- Jasper Conran
- Susannah Constantine
- Maximillion Cooper
- Paul Compitus
- Joseph Corré
- Cher Coulter
- Carolyn Cowan
- Charles Creed
- Scott Crolla
- Neisha Crosland

==== D-I ====
- Wendy Dagworthy
- Helen David
- George Davies
- Kyle De'Volle
- Giles Deacon
- Deborah & Clare
- Cara Delevingne
- Valerie Desmore
- Simon Doonan
- Lou Dalton
- Eddy Downpatrick
- Keanan Duffty
- Petra Ecclestone
- Victor Edelstein
- Warren Edwards
- Gail Elliott
- Elizabeth Emanuel
- Phoebe English
- Matilda Etches
- Chris Eubank
- Clive Evans
- Maxime de la Falaise
- Loulou de la Falaise
- Amal Fashanu
- Afshin Feiz
- Michael Fish
- John Flett
- Marion Foale
- Tan France
- Graham Fraser
- Gina Fratini
- Frederick Freed
- Bella Freud
- Andrea Galer
- John Galliano
- Kimberley Garner
- Bay Garnett
- Elspeth Gibson
- Tom Gilbey
- Darla Jane Gilroy
- Molly Goddard
- Georgina Godley
- Robert Godley
- Peter Golding
- Oliver Goldsmith
- Paul Gorman
- Maria Grachvogel
- Craig Green
- Andrew Groves
- Herta Groves
- Lulu Guinness
- Jeremy Hackett
- Malcolm Hall
- Olivia von Halle
- Katharine Hamnett
- Elizabeth Handley-Seymour
- Georgia Hardinge
- Norman Hartnell
- Ade Hassan
- Terry de Havilland
- Doug Hayward
- Wayne Hemingway
- Scott Henshall
- Jayne Hepsibah
- Katie Hillier
- Bobby Hillson
- Anya Hindmarch
- Jennifer Hocking
- David Holah
- James Holder
- Angela Holmes
- Henry Holland
- Jade Holland Cooper
- Simon Holloway
- Emma Hope
- Aisleyne Horgan-Wallace
- Judy Hornby
- Margaret Howell
- Sophie Hulme
- John Michael Ingram
- Janey Ironside

==== J-O ====
- Betty Jackson
- Charles James
- Richard James
- James Jebbia
- Richard Jewels
- Anna Jewsbury
- Kim Jones
- Stephen Jones
- Zoe Jordan
- Mary Katrantzou
- Clare Waight Keller
- Angela Kelly
- Sara Kelly
- Lulu Kennedy
- Kate Ker-Lane
- Cath Kidston
- Nicholas Kirkwood
- Sophia Kokosalaki
- Ann Margaret Lanchester
- Ricki Noel Lander
- Karolina Laskowska
- Derek Lawlor
- Kate Lechmere
- Daniel Lee
- Supriya Lele
- Tanya Ling
- Dua Lipa
- Ben de Lisi
- Daniel Lismore
- Angus Lloyd
- Pearl Lowe
- Otto Lucas
- Lucile
- Rupert Lycett Green
- M.I.A (Maya Arulpragasam)
- Gerald McCann
- Stella McCartney
- Christopher McDonnell
- Flora McLean
- Alexander McQueen
- Claire Malcolm
- Edward Mann
- Hannah Marshall
- Giuseppe Gustavo 'Jo' Mattli
- Nasir Mazhar
- Edward Meadham
- Tamara Mellon
- Nadine Merabi
- Douglas Millings
- Deborah Milner
- Johnny Moke
- Edward Molyneux
- Marvin Morgan
- Bianca Mosca
- Kate Moss
- Catherine Murray di Montezemolo
- Carri Munden
- Trevor Myles
- Christopher Nemeth
- Ada Nettleship
- Stella Mary Newton
- Richard Nicoll
- Richard Nott
- Sonja Nuttall
- Bruce Oldfield
- Charlotte Olympia
- Beatrix Ong
- Kelly Osbourne

==== P-S ====
- Jenny Packham
- Stewart Parvin
- Melissa Percy
- Gladys Emma Peto
- Arabella Pollen
- Alice Pollock
- Thea Porter
- Mark Powell
- Nigel Preston
- Antony Price
- Harvey Proctor
- Gareth Pugh
- Mary Quant
- Richard Quinn
- Christopher Raeburn
- Michael Rainey
- Edward Rayne
- Catherine Rayner
- John Redfern
- John Reed-Crawford
- Janet Reger
- Kate Reily
- Bernard Rhodes
- Zandra Rhodes
- John Richmond
- Bunny Roger
- Jeffrey Rogers
- Edina Ronay
- Charlotte Ronson
- Martine Rose
- Peter Russell
- Philip Sallon
- David Sassoon
- Janie Schaffer
- Christopher Shannon
- Michael Sherard
- David Shilling
- Tabitha Simmons
- Graham Smith
- Justin Smith
- Paul Smith
- Richard Smith
- Philip Somerville
- Simon Spurr
- Claire Stansfield
- Tomasz Starzewski
- Victor Stiebel
- Stevie Stewart
- Stuart Stockdale
- Joanne Stoker
- Helen Storey
- Henri Strzelecki
- Ian Stuart
- Petra Stunt
- Dan Sullivan
- Paul Surridge
- John Sutcliffe
- Oliver Sykes

==== T-Z ====
- Lucy Tammam
- Alice Temperley
- William Tempest
- Karl Templer
- Ian Thomas
- Teddy Tinling
- Karen Townshend
- Dolly Tree
- Rachel Trevor-Morgan
- Sally Tuffin
- Twiggy
- Patricia Underwood
- Julie Verhoeven
- Stuart Vevers
- Diana Vickers
- Grace Wales Bonner
- Catherine Walker
- Magnus Walker
- Amanda Wakeley
- Marie Wallin
- Tilly Walnes
- Gok Wan
- Sophia Webster
- James Wedge
- Hannah Weiland
- Kim West
- Vivienne Westwood
- Ashley Williams
- Stephen Williams
- Matthew Williamson
- Louise Wilson
- Trinny Woodall
- Aida Woolf
- Charles Frederick Worth
- Rhoda Wyburn
- Esme Young
- Ada Zanditon

=== Scotland ===
- Guy Berryman
- John Boyd
- Serena Bute
- William Chambers
- Philip Colbert
- Holly Fulton
- Bill Gibb
- Patrick Grant
- Charles Jeffrey
- Pam Hogg
- Christopher Kane
- Michelle Mone
- Jean Muir
- Eunice Olumide
- Ronald Paterson
- Ray Petri
- Jonathan Saunders
- John Stephen
- Douglas Stuart
- Stuart Trevor

=== Wales ===
- Laura Ashley
- Jeff Banks
- Mark Eley
- David Emanuel
- Timothy Everest
- Kate Lambert
- Julien Macdonald
- Nina Morgan-Jones
- Tommy Nutter
- Jayne Pierson

== United States ==
=== 0-A ===
- 50 Cent
- Robert Abajian
- Osceola Macarthy Adams
- Adolfo
- Adri
- Adrian
- Joseph Abboud
- Virgil Abloh
- Paul Abrahamian
- Ray Aghayan
- Yoon Ahn
- Jackie Aina
- Steven Alan
- Larry Aldrich
- Lois K. Alexander Lane
- Jason Alkire
- June Ambrose
- Cindy Ambuehl
- Marcus Amerman
- Mike Amiri
- Kaylin Andres
- Paul Andrew
- Loren Aragon
- Asspizza
- Lorencita Atencio
- Bill Atkinson
- Brian Atwood
- Pegah Anvarian
- Bonnie August
- Kevin Aviance
- Jacqueline Ayer

=== B ===
- Mark Badgley
- Xenobia Bailey
- Louella Ballerino
- Jeffrey Banks
- Travis Banton
- A$AP Bari
- Jhane Barnes
- Robin Barnes
- Tuesday Bassen
- Michael Bastian
- Suede Baum
- Kathrine Baumann
- Rod Beattie
- Jen Beeman
- Geoffrey Beene
- Bill Belew
- Hunter Bell
- Salehe Bembury
- Zaida Ben-Yusuf
- Henri Willis Bendel
- Stacey Bendet
- Fira Benenson
- Laura Bennett
- Susan Bennis
- Fonzworth Bentley
- Chris Benz
- Robyn Berkley
- JoAnn Berman
- Danielle Bernstein
- Drew Bernstein
- James Pasqual Bettio
- Jonas Bevacqua
- Christopher Bevans
- Beyoncé
- Jeanne Bice
- Ashley Biden
- Stanley Blacker
- Hazel Rodney Blackman
- Richard Blackwell
- Bob Bland
- Bill Blass
- Mildred Blount
- Stevie Boi
- Krayzie Bone
- Ann Bonfoey Taylor
- Waraire Boswell
- Barbara Bradley Baekgaard
- Rosemary Brantley
- Tom Brigance
- Dianne Brill
- Helen Brockman
- Bonnie Broel
- Donald Brooks
- Thom Browne
- Sabrina Bryan
- Dana Buchman
- Sophie Buhai
- Georgia Bullock Lloyd
- Tory Burch
- Kenny Burns
- Stephen Burrows
- Jon Buscemi
- Lauren Bush
- Ebenezer Butterick
- Austin Butts
- Amanda Bynes

=== C ===
- Don C
- Jean Cacicedo
- Lillian Cahn
- Miles Cahn
- Joan Calabrese
- Sarah Calhoun
- Eva Camacho-Sánchez
- Jeanne S. Campbell
- Carlos Campos
- Vince Camuto
- Joselyn Cano
- Ruth Sacks Caplin
- Albert Capraro
- Alex Carleton
- Jack Carlson
- Hattie Carnegie
- Elizabeth Carpenter
- Kelly Carrington
- Bonnie Cashin
- Cecilia Cassini
- Oleg Cassini
- Kristin Cavallari
- Sal Cesarani
- Richard Chai
- Julie Chaiken
- Angela Chan
- Angel Chang
- Alabama Chanin
- Kip Chapelle
- Ceil Chapman
- Juli Lynne Charlot
- Arielle Charnas
- Willy Chavarria
- Monika Chiang
- Margaret Cho
- Andrew Christian
- Matthew Christopher
- Doo-Ri Chung
- Susan Cianciolo
- Liz Claiborne
- Claw Money
- Telfar Clemens
- Susie Coelho
- Nudie Cohn
- Kenneth Cole
- Liz Collins
- Sean Combs
- Dennis Comeau
- Rachel Comey
- Cristi Conaway
- Lauren Conrad
- Mandy Coon
- Jo Copeland
- Calleen Cordero
- Dorian Corey
- Victor Costa
- Michael Costello
- Jeffrey Costello
- Fannie Criss
- Caresse Crosby
- Kein Cross
- Candice Cuoco

=== D-F ===
- Caroline D'Amore
- Lilly Daché
- Laura Dahl
- Phoebe Dahl
- Eric Daman
- Chloe Dao
- Betty David
- Karl Davis
- Rob Davis
- Vicky Davis
- Daniel Day
- Marisol Deluna
- Ellen Louise Demorest
- Jane Derby
- Lyn Devon
- Diana Dew
- Scott Disick
- Kristen Doute
- Rehn Dudukgian
- Haylie Duff
- Hilary Duff
- Charlie Dunn
- Alison Eastwood
- Mike Eckhaus
- Marc Ecko
- Alan Eckstein
- Melody Ehsani
- Florence Eiseman
- Lauren Elaine
- Perry Ellis
- Ella Emhoff
- Diana Eng
- Kataluna Enriquez
- Bonnie Erickson
- Patrik Ervell
- George Esquivel
- Luis Estevez
- Charles Evans
- Lou Eyrich
- Baron Von Fancy
- Beatrice Farnham
- Kaffe Fassett
- Natalia Fedner
- Beverly Feldman
- Randy Fenoli
- Douglas Ferguson
- Abi Ferrin
- Erin Fetherston
- Andrew Fezza
- Lupe Fiasco
- Patricia Field
- Phyllis Fife
- Jimmie Carole Fife Stewart
- Sandy Fife Wilson
- Ron Finley
- Renée Firestone
- Eileen Fisher
- Edith Flagg
- Alan Flusser
- Anne Fogarty
- Edith Foltz
- Cliff Fong
- Mia Fonssagrives-Solow
- Tom Ford
- Roger Forsythe
- Daniel Franco
- Paul Frank
- Diane von Fürstenberg
- Talita von Fürstenberg

=== G-H ===
- James Galanos
- Katie Gallagher
- Jeff Garner
- Eric Gaskins
- Kaia Gerber
- Rudi Gernreich
- August Getty
- Nats Getty
- Mossimo Giannulli
- Kayne Gillaspie
- Diane Gilman
- Sophie Gimbel
- Jared Gold
- Kimberly Goldson
- Lori Goldstein
- Selena Gomez
- Wes Gordon
- Jenny Gordy
- Gary Graham
- Gogo Graham
- Dorothy Grant
- Sandra Gray
- Howard Greer
- Henry Grethel
- Odessa Warren Grey
- Lynda Grose
- Shoshanna Lonstein Gruss
- Sergio Guadarrama
- Mondo Guerra
- Prabal Gurung
- Julia Haart
- Cassidy Haley
- Kevan Hall
- George Halley
- Halston
- Peggy Hamilton
- Tim Hamilton
- Mary Alice Haney
- Antthony Mark Hankins
- Susie Schmitt Hanson
- Donwan Harrell
- Marcy Harriell
- Lorene Harrison
- Johnson Hartig
- Tinker Hatfield
- Julie Haus
- Elizabeth Hawes
- Jesse Hawley
- Batsheva Hay
- Edith Head
- Oliver Helden
- Seth Aaron Henderson
- Kimberly Hendrix
- Eta Hentz
- Gregory Herman
- Stan Herman
- Mila Hermanovski
- Lazaro Hernandez
- Tommy Hilfiger
- Anne T. Hill
- Sherri Hill
- Nicky Hilton Rothschild
- Lena Himmelstein
- Susan Holmes
- Joe Allen Hong
- Jacob H. Horwitz
- Ola Hudson
- Keith Hufnagel
- Merry Hull
- Misa Hylton

=== I-K ===
- Stacy Igel
- Jenn Im
- Indashio
- Irene (Irene Lentz)
- Connor Ives
- Dee and Ricky Jackson
- Janet Jackson
- Marc Jacobs
- Eli James
- Sidney Janis
- Kerby Jean-Raymond
- jeffstaple
- Kendall Jenner
- Kylie Jenner
- Jermikko
- Elisa Jimenez
- Daymond John
- John P. John (Mr John)
- Kevin Johnn
- Coco Johnsen
- Betsey Johnson
- Teri Jon
- Gretchen Jones
- Kidada Jones
- Lauren Jones
- Victor Joris
- Margaret Josephs
- Christian Joy
- Alexander Julian
- Jessica Jung
- Nik Kacy
- Bill Kaiserman
- Robert Kalloch
- Norma Kamali
- Karen Kane
- Karl Kani
- Jen Kao
- Emily Kappes
- Edmund Kara
- Donna Karan
- Kim Kardashian
- Khloé Kardashian
- Kourtney Kardashian
- Herbert Kasper
- Ali Kay
- Elizabeth Keckley
- Rod Keenan
- Clinton Kelly
- Patrick Kelly
- Kathy Kemp
- Dorit Kemsley
- Omar Kiam
- Christina Kim
- Elaine Kim
- Eugenia Kim
- Alan King
- Ben King
- Muriel King
- Joy Kingston
- Alexis Kirk
- Katiti Kironde
- Audrey Kitching
- Charles Kleibacker
- Anne Klein
- Calvin Klein
- John Kloss
- Mychael Knight
- Eric de Kolb
- Jonathan Koon
- Solange Knowles
- Tina Knowles
- Ronny Kobo
- Michael Kors
- Reed Krakoff
- Carson Kressley
- Michael Kuluva

=== L ===
- Pepper LaBeija
- Michelle Laine
- Derek Lam
- Brianna Lance
- Kenneth Jay Lane
- Liz Lange
- Kara Laricks
- Raun Larose
- Byron Lars
- Zoe Latta
- Ralph Lauren
- Nicole M. LeBlanc
- Heidi Lee
- Helen Lee
- Suzanne Lee
- Larry LeGaspi
- Judith Leiber
- Humberto Leon
- Nanette Lepore
- Tina Leser
- Maurice Levin
- Asher Levine
- Beth Levine
- Larry Levine
- Matt Levine
- Monica Lewinsky
- Monah Li
- Sandy Liang
- Brian Lichtenberg
- Andrea Lieberman
- Lil Debbie
- Carol Lim
- Phillip Lim
- Adam Lippes
- Col. Littleton
- Yohanna Logan
- Gene London
- Don Loper
- Jennifer Lopez
- Oscar G. Lopez
- Jerry Lorenzo
- Bobby Love
- Ron LoVece
- Ann Lowe
- Chloe Lukasiak
- Parke Lutter
- Jenna Lyons

=== M ===
- Jack Mackenroth
- Bob Mackie
- Steve Madden
- Leigh Magar
- Edith Mahier
- Mainbocher (Main Bocher)
- Loza Maléombho
- John Malkovich
- Adrienne Maloof
- Taryn Manning
- Margaret Manny
- Rooney Mara
- Mary Jane Marcasiano
- Chris March
- Marjorie Bear Don't Walk
- Lana Marks
- Luba Marks
- Paul Marlow
- Deborah Marquit
- Leanne Marshall
- Kelli Martin
- Sid Mashburn
- Manny Mashouf
- Saul Maslavi
- Brandon Maxwell
- Vera Maxwell
- Claire McCardell
- Jay McCarroll
- Shon McCarthy
- Becca McCharen-Tran
- Jessica McClintock
- Jack McCollough
- LisaRaye McCoy
- Reyn McCullough
- Bradon McDonald
- Mary McFadden
- Arthur McGee
- Hogan McLaughlin
- Mark McNairy
- Leah McSweeney
- Nancy Melcher
- Raul Melgoza
- Rosie Mercado
- Ashton Michael
- Keith Michael
- Draya Michele
- Michael Michele
- David Meister
- Kaila Methven
- Emily Miles
- Sally Milgrim
- Annie Jenness Miller
- Nicole Miller
- Nolan Miller
- Romeo Miller
- Rosemary Reed Miller
- Savannah Miller
- Sienna Miller
- James Mischka
- Isaac Mizrahi
- Bibhu Mohapatra
- Germaine Monteil
- Marjorie Montgomery
- Heidi Montag
- Vincent Monte-Sano
- Diego Montoya
- Ardina Moore
- John Moore
- Mandy Moore
- Mark Mooring
- Sonja Morgan
- Leslie Morris
- Rose Mortem
- Minnie Mortimer
- Tinsley Mortimer
- Rebecca Moses
- Lauren Moshi
- Tereneh Mosley
- Bethany Mota
- Mario Moya
- Ibtihaj Muhammad
- Peter Mui
- Kate and Laura Mulleavy
- Malini Murjani
- Anthony Muto
- Paige Mycoskie
- Josephine Myers-Wapp
- Morton Myles

=== N-Q ===
- Nas
- Gela Nash-Taylor
- Josie Natori
- Tracy Negoshian
- Lloyd Kiva New
- Bernard Newman
- Albert Nipon
- Vanessa Noel
- Ralph Lauren
- Charles Nolan
- Peggy Noland
- Misha Nonoo
- Norman Norell
- Maggie Norris
- Ryan Jude Novelline
- Bobbie Nudie
- Aubrey O'Day
- Melissa Odabash
- Dee Ocleppo
- Jamie Okuma
- Todd Oldham
- Shayne Oliver
- Ashley Olsen
- Mary-Kate Olsen
- Orry-Kelly
- Virgil Ortiz
- Mel Ottenberg
- Jennifer Ouellette
- Kimberly Ovitz
- Rick Owens
- Marialia Pacitto
- Olivia Palermo
- Gladys Parker
- Molly Parnis
- Russell Patterson
- DJ Paul
- Laura Pearson
- Sylvia Pedlar
- Maya Penn
- Wendy Pepper
- Claire Pettibone
- Amanda Phelan
- Elizabeth Phelps
- Mary Phelps Jacob
- Sarah Phillips
- Robin Piccone
- Henriette Simon Picker
- Pictureplane
- Mary Ping
- Maria Pinto
- Babette Pinsky
- Andrea Pitter
- Mimi Plange
- Cecile Platovsky
- Wendy Ponca
- Lawren Pope
- Whitney Port
- Zac Posen
- Clare Potter
- Heron Preston
- Cristiana Proietti
- Prudence
- J. Morgan Puett
- Lilly Pulitzer

=== R ===
- Max Raab
- Tala Raassi
- Randi Rahm
- Traver Rains
- Natacha Rambova
- David Rappaport
- Rasheeda
- Emily Grace Reaves
- Harris Reed
- Nell Donnelly Reed
- Wendi Reed
- Tracy Reese
- Billy Reid
- Rose Marie Reid
- Ben Reig
- Oscar de la Renta
- Edith Reuss
- Jessica Rey
- Donna Ricco
- Santino Rice
- Jessica Rich
- Richie Rich
- Lisa Rinna
- Ripley Rader
- Larry Roberts Salters
- Bill Robinson
- Craig Robinson
- Patrick Robinson
- Narciso Rodriguez
- Ariana Rockefeller
- Carolyne Roehm
- Ciera Rogers
- Ruth Rogers-Altmann
- Alice Roi
- Pamella Roland
- William Rondina
- Helen Rose
- Lela Rose
- Daniel Roseberry
- Eva Rosencrans
- Steven Rosengard
- Nettie Rosenstein
- Christian Francis Roth
- Franklin Rowe
- Cynthia Rowley
- Rachel Roy
- Sonja Rubin
- Ralph Rucci
- Clovis Ruffin
- Mirela Rupic
- Marty Ruza

=== S ===
- Marie St John
- Hailie Sahar
- Cynthia Sakai
- Sandra Sakata
- Fernando Sánchez
- Giorgio di Sant' Angelo
- Carolina Santo Domingo
- Behnaz Sarafpour
- Ferdinando Sarmi
- Kara Saun
- Michele Savino
- Austin Scarlett
- Werner G. Scharff
- Nicole Scherzinger
- Michael Schmidt
- Carolyn Schnurer
- Caroline Zoe Schumm
- Jeremy Scott
- L'Wren Scott
- Veronica Scott
- Jeffrey Sebelia
- Selena
- Chloë Sevigny
- Ronaldus Shamask
- Geraldine M. Sherman
- Eileen Shields
- Jasmin Shokrian
- Darcey Silva
- Dexter Simmons
- Diggy Simmons
- Kimora Lee Simmons
- Russell Simmons
- Fabrice Simon
- Adele Simpson
- Jessica Simpson
- Rubin Singer
- Christian Siriano
- Nikki Sixx
- Elena Slivnyak
- Bill Smith
- LaQuan Smith
- Michelle Smith
- Willi Smith
- Todd Snyder
- Mimi So
- Peter Som
- Aimee Song
- Luke Song
- Andre Soriano
- Emilio Sosa
- Soulja Boy
- Kate Spade
- Peter Speliopoulos
- Robert L. Spencer
- Mary Lou Spiess
- Ruth Spooner
- Stephen Sprouse
- Jeffree Star
- George Stavropoulos
- Frances Stein
- Gwen Stefani
- Scott Steinberg
- Francesca Sterlacci
- Josie Stevens
- Ellen Stewart
- Johan Ludwig Stifel
- Steven Stolman
- Kate Stoltz
- Elena Stonaker
- Christopher Straub
- Jill Stuart
- Shawn Stussy
- Tara Subkoff
- Anna Sui
- Ivy Supersonic
- Charles Suppon
- Swizz Beatz

=== T-V ===
- Wesley Tann
- Isa Tapia
- Amir Taghi
- Robert Tagliapietra
- Gustave Tassell
- Tila Tequila
- Tere Tereba
- Thea Tewi
- Barbara Tfank
- Ouigi Theodore
- threeasfour
- Stephanie Thomas
- Todd Thomas
- Azalea Thorpe
- Vicky Tiel
- Monika Tilley
- Susie Tompkins Buell
- Robert Tonner
- Marina Toybina
- Pauline Trigère
- Van Day Truex
- Ivanka Trump
- Elaine Turner
- Jessie Franklin Turner
- Maurice Tumarkin
- David Tutera
- Tyler, The Creator
- Kay Unger
- Zelda Wynn Valdes
- Valentina
- Alvin Valley
- Carmen Marc Valvo
- Theadora Van Runkle
- Gloria Vanderbilt
- John Varvatos
- Joan Vass
- Elena Velez
- Mike Vensel
- Gia Ventola
- Louis Verdad
- Nick Verreos
- Sally Victor
- Miranda Vidak
- Adrienne Vittadini
- Clare Vivier
- Michaele Vollbracht
- Voris
- Daniel Vosovic

=== W-Z ===
- Alexander Wang
- Vera Wang
- Jahleel Weaver
- Jimmy Webb
- Marissa Webb
- Clayton and Flavie Webster
- Timo Weiland
- Chester Weinberg
- Heidi Weisel
- John Weitz
- Stuart Weitzman
- Clare West
- Kanye West
- Stephen West
- Vera West
- Margaret Roach Wheeler
- Delina White
- Carol Hannah Whitfield
- Jazmin Whitley
- Bill Frank Whitten
- Emily Wilkens
- Jeffrey Williams
- Matthew Williams
- Pharrell Williams
- Vanessa Williams
- Kevin Willis
- Eva Danielle Wittels
- Sherry Wolf
- Kaisik Wong
- Sue Wong
- Margaret Wood
- Nick Wooster
- Sydney Wragge
- Jaime Xie
- Luly Yang
- Bethany Yellowtail
- Yeohlee
- Molly Yestadt
- Sean Yseult
- Jean Yu
- Jay Z
- Zaldy
- Karen Zambos
- Zane One
- Diva Zappa
- Zarah
- Paul Zastupnevich
- Rachel Zoe
- Zoran
- Mark Zunino

== Uruguay ==
- Gabriela Hearst

== Venezuela ==
- Nicolas Felizola
- Carolina Herrera
- Ángel Sánchez

== Vietnam ==
- Thuy Diep
- Tôn Hiếu Anh
- Đặng Thị Minh Hạnh

== Zaire ==
- Odette Krempin
- Adama Ndiaye

== Zimbabwe ==
- Liam Fahy

== See also ==
- List of jewellery designers
