= Lovece =

Lovece is a surname. Notable people with the surname include:

- Fabiana Lovece (born 1972), Argentinian biathlete
- Frank Lovece (born 1958), American journalist and writer
- Frank Lovece (1956–2018), Australian musician, filmmaker, and poet
- Natalia Lovece (born 1978), Argentinian biathlete.
- Ron LoVece (1939–2010), American fashion designer
