= Catta Donkersloot =

Dutch fashion designer

Catta Donkersloot (born 1980) is a Dutch fashion designer.

Donkersloot won the IAF award for most creative design in 2008. Together with Lisa Kortenhorst she created the installation (DE)-constructing me in the Van Gogh Museum. She also owns a mainstream label, Imoto Chan, and a webshop, Bearded Birdie.
