= Johnny Moke =

British shoe designer

Johnny Moke (2 September 1945 – 28 April 2009) was a British shoe designer.

He was born John Joseph Rowley in Walthamstow, east London on 2 September 1945.

Moke had a store at 396 King's Road, Chelsea, London, and his customers included Tom Cruise, Cher, Jools Holland, Paul Weller, Tim Roth, and Gary Oldman.
