= Shon McCarthy =

American fashion designer

Shonda McCarthy Simmons (also known as Shon McCarthy and Shon Simmons; born 1973 of 1974) is the Director/Curator of three Jackson State University art galleries. The galleries are JSU's Johnson Hall gallery, College of Liberal Arts gallery, and JSU Downtown galleries. Exhibitions are student centered and assist to "Exposure+Experience=Lifelong Learning"(gallery mission) for student by including student work with the international and national artists' exhibitions. Exhibitions have ranged from painting created by musician George Clinton. JSU was the first university to exhibit his paintings. In September 2016, McCarthy collaborated with the Philadelphia Museum of Art and procured a gifted 25 piece permanent collection of Patrick Kelly (thanks to a donation from Bill and Bjorn Amelan). Spring of 2017, she collaborated with London's Belgravia Art Gallery to bring art created and signed by Nelson Mandela. McCarthy created JSU's Gallery1 Summer Art Institute and where JSU Department of Art Alumni taught art to 150 K-9 students. For two summers, she supervised and instructed art to over 200 K-9 students this included mulit-medium art to sewing instruction. McCarthy later procured an additional 250 plus pieces from the Patrick Kelly collection in the summer of 2017, it is housed the H.T. Sampson Archives.

For ten years, McCarthy was a fashion designer in New York City. She created an accessories line that became known as the "It Bag" for celebrities. She has been mentioned have in financial publications such as the Wall St Journal and Nikkei in Japan, Vogue online, Elle (US, Italy, UK) and Japan, Harpers Bazaar Japan and Lucky Magazine write-ups. The accessories were carried in stores such as Bloomingdales, Henri Bendel, Harvey Nichols, Fred Segal, and LeBon Marche. She was a guest speaker for a Marketing class at Parsons Fashions School in New York.

McCarthy is a licensed art instructor. McCarthy instructed a class at Millsaps College's Enrichment Series titled, " How To Start Your Own Fashion Line" in 2015 and 2016. She received her B.A. from Millsaps College and her Masters from Jackson State University.
