= Jackie Sencion =

Jackie Sencion, is the founder and CEO of La Lumia—a longstanding boutique TriBeCa. Jackie, a Fashion Institute of Technology graduate, has been designing and featuring her designs in her boutique since 1985.

== Life and career ==
Sencion was born in the Dominican Republic and moved to New York City with her mother and sister in 1969. Before opening La Lumia, Jackie utilized her skills in various domestic apparel and import companies that involved massive globe-trotting. Her travels not only served her in her role as design liaison for clothing vendors but also got her involved with the different fashion scenes of Milan, Paris, London, and Tokyo—to name a few.

Jackie and La Lumia have been featured and reviewed in numerous New York publications such as the New York Times, Time Out New York, and New York Magazine, where La Lumia has been named one of New York's Best Stores for six consecutive years.

In October 2006, Jackie won the "Manhattan Chamber of Commerce - 9/11 Survival Award - 5 Years Later".
