= Tôn Hiếu Anh =

Vietnamese fashion designer

Tôn Hiếu Anh is a Vietnamese fashion designer, and editor and producer of Fashion Studio on VTV.

He was a model from 1994 to 2000, then moved into design, winning the 2nd prize of fashion contest 24/7 of the British Council in 2002, and 1st prize of Dep Fair 2005.
