= Monica Moss (fashion designer) =

Bolivian fashion designer

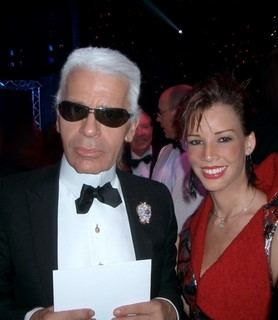
Karl Lagerfeld and Monica Moss at the Red Cross Ball in Monaco, August 2005

Monica Moss (born Monica Susana Schütt 28 January 1974) is a Bolivian fashion designer of German descent. After initial success with her 1998 debut line An Evening of Enchantment, she has gone on to provide designs worn by celebrities including George Michael, Salma Hayek, Rob Lowe, and Sting. Her brand is known for playful colors and shapes, as well as its commitment to fair trade, sustainability, and charity. In 2007, she was recognized as "Most Out-There" by the New York Second City Style Fashion Blog.

== Biography ==
Monica Schütt was born on 28 January 1974 in Santa Cruz, Bolivia. In her early youth she started designing and sewing her own personal wardrobe. After her scholastic education at the German College in Santa Cruz, she went to Europe and studied fashion design in Milan. After returning to Bolivia, she created her own collections using her artist name Moss, named after her initials. Since 1998, she has been presenting her fashion in Europe, Japan and the United States and has earned international recognition under her current label Monica Moss..
