= Adnan Akbar =

Saudi fashion designer

'Adnan Akbar, born in Mecca, is a Saudi fashion designer described as the "Saint Laurent of the Middle East". He studied embroidery in Lebanon and in Karachi. In 1989, he entered a licensing agreement for embroidered luxury fabrics with the French textile company Bianchini Férier. In 1989, he launched a collection of pret a porter which was well received in the United States.
