= Ricardo Preto =

Portuguese fashion designer

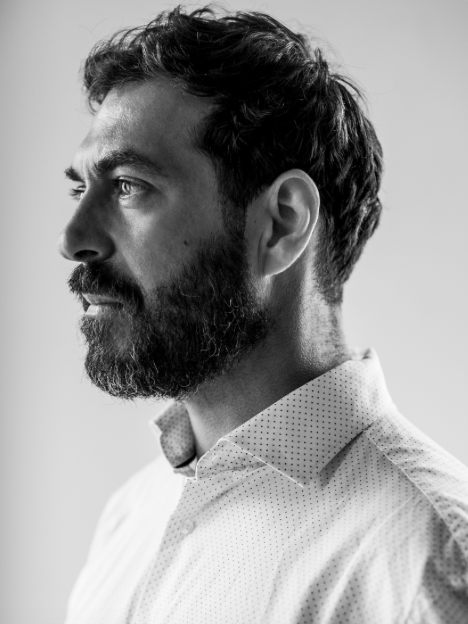
Ricardo Preto Fashion Designer

Ricardo Preto is a Portuguese fashion designer with a national and international career, based in Lisbon. He is the Creative Director of the Amorim Luxury Group and is also responsible for the private labels (Paula, JNcQUOI Comporta, JNcQUOI House and JNcQUOI Maison).

== Biography ==
Ricardo was born on July 26, 1972, and grew up in Azeitão, Portugal.

He moved to Lisbon to study architecture in Lusiada University, but later attended a Couture Course with Master Maria Emília Sobreira and a Handbags and Accessories Short Course at Saint Martins School of Arts in London.

He designed collections for the Spanish brand Amarras and created Handbag lines for Pertegaz, as well as an Accessories line for the Portuguese Fashion Designers Dino Alves and Osvaldo Martins.

Ricardo's first collections were presented in "Manobras de Maio", after that in 2005 he began to be part of Portugal Fashion's designers board and in March 2006 integrated ModaLisboa's LAB platform.

In 2007, he was part of the Senior Designers Board at the ModaLisboa' - Lisbon Fashion Week.

Apart from the collections of his own brand, he works as a creative director, shooting fashion editorials for magazines such as DIF, Máxima, Zoot, Umbigo, Must, among others; and creating campaigns for Vista Alegre, Água das Pedras, Moviflor and BPI.

He also did several customization projects for other brands, for example Levi's, Energie, Nike, Miss Sixty, Pepe Jeans and Silhouette.

He did creative partnerships with brands like Canon, Bic, Oliveira da Serra, Italian Motor Village-Spazio Dual, Toshiba and was the wardrobe designer of the "Paint Me" opera - a co-production of São Carlos Theatre and Culturgest - staged by Rui Horta, which premiered in 2010.

Between 2010 and 2015 he created several collections for Meam Style, the collections were sold in Spain, France and Italy. During this period he collaborated with the brand Clays designing collections for his own brand and for Meam Style, where he worked for 5 years.

In 2016 he started his partnership with Rustan's.

Between 2016 and 2021, he designed the lines Ricardo Preto exclusively for Rustan's Men and Women, and U by Ricardo Preto for Rustan's Men and Women, as well as accessories for the two lines, sold in the Asian market.

He returned to the catwalks of ModaLisboa to present the collection Ricardo Preto exclusively for Rustan's SS 2016, after being absent from the FW 16/17 ModaLisboa edition.

In June 2017, he presented in a Showcase in Paris his SS 18 Men collection during the Paris Fashion Week Men.

Ricardo sells his main line, RICARDO PRETO, at Loja das Meias in Portugal, alongside other international designers.

He is currently creative director of Amorim Luxury Group, based on the global luxury market. Ricardo Preto will be responsible for developing Amorim Luxury's own brands (Paula, JNcQUOI Comporta, JNcQUOI House and JNcQUOI Maison).
