= Joy Kingston =

American fashion designer

Joy Kingston (December 6, 1922 – January 30, 2010) was a fashion designer. She was born in Kansas City, Missouri. Kingston graduated from high school at the early age of 15, in June 1938. She subsequently studied at the University of Missouri for one year, and then attended The University of Wisconsin beginning in 1939, where she majored in Art in the university's School of Home Economics. In her studies there, an emphasis existed on dress design and interior decoration, which influenced her aspirations for these occupations. Kingston also studied for one additional semester at the Kansas City Art Institute.
