= Marianne Alvoni =

Swiss fashion designer

Marianne Alvoni (born 15 April 1964, in Berne) is a Swiss fashion designer.

In 1985, she opened her own atelier in Berne (Switzerland). Alvoni bought her first sewing machine with installment payments of 20 Swiss francs per month.

In 1989 she moved to larger premises with a shopfront in the old town of Berne. In 1990, three of her creations were shown during the 700th anniversary of the Swiss confederation at the Swiss National Museum. Those creations remained part of the permanent collection afterwards.

In 2011, she opened her atelier in Worb, and presented her work in Singapore during a fashion show sponsored by the household appliances brand V-Zug.

At the centre of her creation, elaborately produced in her atelier, there are, alongside her Alvoni Weekdays daywear collection, above all, Alvoni Haute Couture, evening-wear and wedding dresses.

Today Alvoni lives in Worb, Switzerland and Verona, Italy.
