= Philipp Tampus =

Filipino fashion designer

- Born: Philipp Piezas Tampus
- Occupation: Fashion designer
- Years active: 2000s–present
- Known for: Bridal wear, evening gowns

Philipp Piezas Tampus is a Filipino fashion designer known for his bridal and evening wear. Based in Cebu, Philippines, he gained national recognition as a runner-up on the first season of Project Runway Philippines. He has presented collections at Philippine Fashion Week and at events during London Fashion Week.

== Early life and education ==
He developed an interest in drawing and design, which he pursued independently while studying computer science in college. After college, he worked in a local boutique where he gained experience in tailoring and fabric handling.

== Career ==
=== Early career ===
Tampus began his professional career specializing in bridal gowns and evening wear. He worked overseas for more than a decade in Saudi Arabia and the United Arab Emirates.

=== Project Runway Philippines ===
In 2008, Tampus competed in the first season of Project Runway Philippines, a reality television competition for fashion designers. He finished as the first runner-up.

=== Fashion shows ===
Tampus has participated in Philippine Fashion Week and the Panasonic Manila Fashion Festival.

In 2019, Tampus presented a collection in the United Kingdom during London Fashion Week. He showcased a collection inspired by the sampaguita (the national flower of the Philippines) at the "Creative Economy Through Fashion" event held at the House of Lords. He also presented work at the House of Ikons show. The collection utilized traditional Filipino textiles such as piña cocoon and Argao hablon.

== Design style ==
Tampus’s work often incorporates elaborate embroidery, hand-applied embellishments, and structured tailoring. He frequently uses Filipino cultural themes and traditional fabrics in his designs.

== Business ==
Tampus operates Philipp Tampus Atelier in Cebu City, Philippines, which produces custom bridal gowns and evening wear.
