= Madeleine Laferrière =

French fashion designer (1847–1912)

- Born: 1847
- Died: 1912 (aged 64–65)
- Occupation: Designer

Madeleine Laferrière (1847 – 1912) was a French designer, best remembered for her fashion house Maison Laferrière in Paris, and for designing dresses for Queen Alexandra of Great Britain and Queen Maud of Norway.
