= Robert Abi Nader =

Lebanese fashion designer

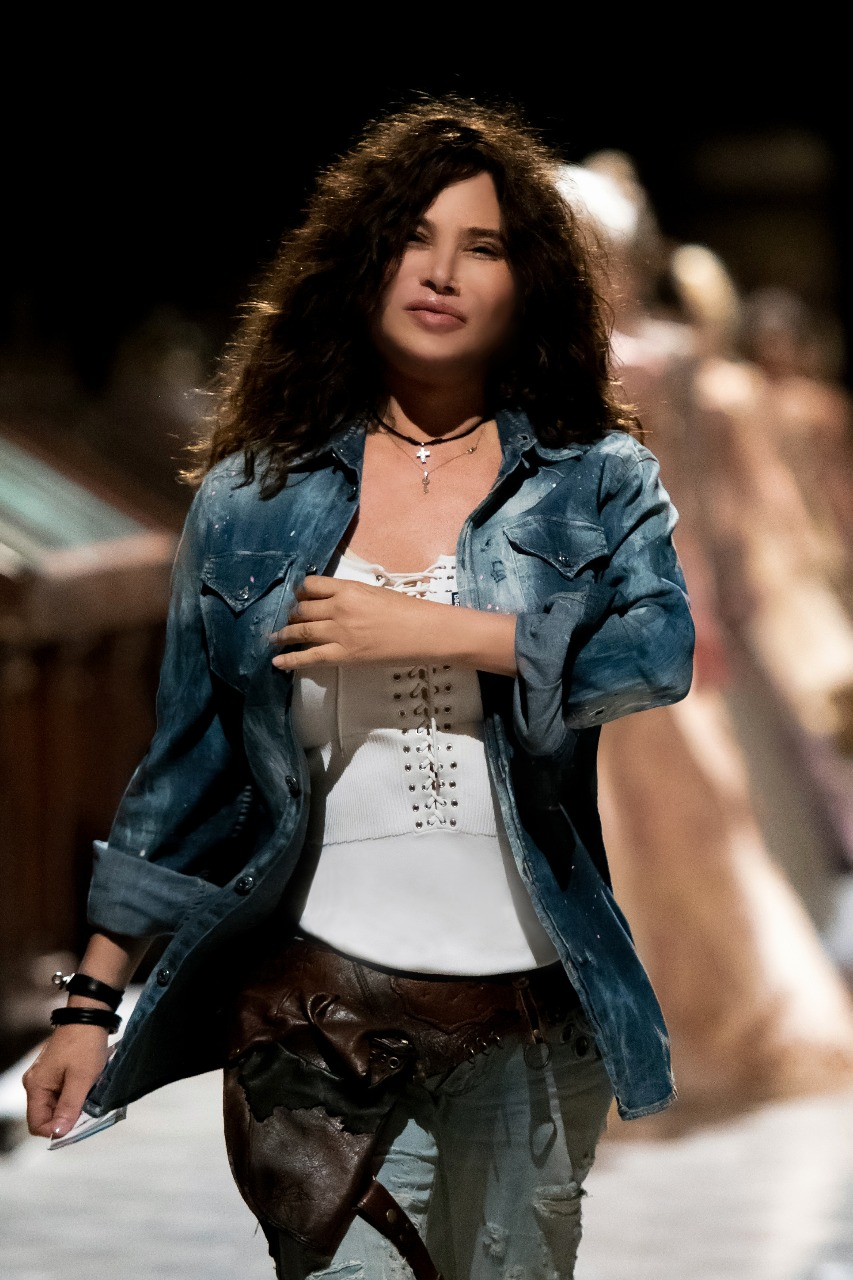
Robert Abi Nader

Robert Abi Nader (Arabic: روبير ابي نادر) is a Lebanese fashion designer.

== Career ==
Robert went to Paris, the capital of the haute couture and fashion world, to pursue his studies in fashion design. He was accepted into the prestigious Chambre Syndicale de la Haute Couture, where he became one of the first successful Lebanese fashion designers in France.

Robert dresses a number of princesses, first ladies, movie stars, and beauty queens. He has been called the "king of Middle Eastern haute couture".
