= Yahya Al Bishri =

Saudi fashion designer

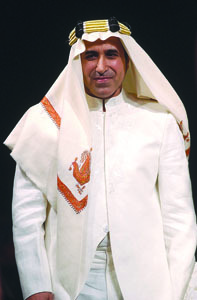
- Al Bishri in 2006
- Born: 13 August 1962 (age 63); Abha, Saudi Arabia
- Years active: 1988–present
- Labels: YAHYA; Elements by Yahya
- Website: www.yahyacouture.com

Yahya Al Bishri (born 13 August 1962) is a Saudi fashion designer. He has designed garments for King Abdullah and royal families around the world such as Diana, Princess of Wales.

== Early life and education ==
Yahya Al Bishri was born in Abha, where he received primary education before moving to Jeddah, to complete his study. Attracted to art, fashion and design world which is full of creation and innovation. His hobby was developed to become a profession through academic study at the Milano School of Fashion and the Paris American Academy for art and fashion. Al Bishri, who in the late 1980s was one of the first Saudis to enter the world of fashion, was used to overcoming barriers. In 1988 Yahya Al Bishri graduated as a fashion designer.

== Career ==
Al Bishri has been credited with contributing to the development of the Saudi fashion industry by incorporating elements of traditional Saudi clothing with international influences. Introducing new designs within Saudi Arabia’s fashion sector has presented challenges.

Unlike other Saudi designers, who usually settle abroad in foreign countries, Al Bishri decided to remain in the Kingdom and make Saudi Arabia his primary target market.
