= Richard Jewels =

British entrepreneur (born 1984)

Richard Jewels (born 24 February 1984) is a British entrepreneur, who holds the record for designing the world's most expensive men's suit. He launched the R.Jewels fashion brand in 2010, with his line of clothes solely focused on catering to the luxury market.

== Early years ==
Jewels was born in Nigeria, to Igbo parents. His family moved to Manchester in the UK when he was one years old. Jewels never expressed an interest in fashion as a child.

In September 2002, Jewels moved to Luton, which is a large town in Bedfordshire, England, north of London. He began attending Luton University, where he obtained a bachelor's degree in Law and Media Production. During his time, Jewels was often noted for his unique dress sense. He went on to customise suits, which started generating interest from his peers.

== Designs ==
After completing his degree, Jewels moved to London and started developing his designs. His trademark designs included use of Swarovski crystals on suit jackets, which have drawn a lot of attention from onlookers.

In 2009, his work attracted the attention of Liverpool designer, Stuart Hughes. Together, they worked in collaboration to produce a suit consisting of 480 diamonds priced at £599,000. This valuation beat the previous world record for the world's most expensive suit set by Alex Amosu.
