= Guðmundur Jörundsson =

Icelandic fashion designer (born 1987)

- Born: 1987 (age 37–38); Reykjavík, Iceland
- Citizenship: Iceland
- Education: Iceland Academy of the Arts
- Occupation: Fashion designer
- Years active: 2008 – present
- Organization(s): JÖR by GUÐMUNDUR JÖRUNDSSON, Kormákur & Skjöldur
- Known for: Fashion design
- Awards: DV Culture Award for 2011
- Website: www.jorstore.com

Guðmundur Jörundsson (born 1987 in Reykjavík, Iceland) is an Icelandic fashion designer. Jörundsson graduated from the Iceland Academy of the Arts in 2011. Prior to graduation in 2010, he was commissioned to design a new master collection for fashion shop GK Reykjavík. Also and had co-founded alongside Kormákur Geirharðsson and Skjöldur Sigurjónsson the Icelandic Kormákur & Skjöldur brand; he is the creative director and head designer of this Icelandic fashion brand.

In October 2012, Jörundsson announced he would launch his own label JÖR by GUÐMUNDUR JÖRUNDSSON while remaining as creative director for Kormákur & Skjöldur.
