= Apti Eziev =

Belarusian fashion designer

Apti Eziev (born 21 July 1989 in Russia) is a fashion designer based in Belarus.

Participated in fashion shows:
