= Wardha Saleem =

Pakistani fashion designer

Wardha Saleem is a Pakistani fashion designer and the CEO of the Pakistan Fashion Council.

== Early life ==
Wardha Saleem was born in Hyderabad, Pakistan, and now resides in Karachi, Pakistan with her family. She is an alumnus of the Indus Valley School of Art and Architecture where she graduated with a distinction in textile design.

== Career ==
In 2006, after a career that entailed teaching textile and fashion at Indus Valley, Saleem launched her label Wardha Saleem. Her work is known for using indigenous inspiration, vibrant colours and traditional printing techniques. In 2011, Wardha launched her printed Lawn Collection. For the collection, she was nominated for the Lux Style Awards in the category for Best Lawn Brand. In March 2012, she made her debut on the runway at the Showcase with her luxury prêt-à-porter line "Jhirki", followed closely by another collection in April 2012 for Fashion Week Pakistan by the name of "Sinned" and a line of patchwork outerwear in October 2012 consisting of juxtaposed black-and-white patterns with denim and colourful Pakistani folk toy motifs. Her creations have gone on to include a "Folk Play", "Doodle Junction" and most recently, a "Dasht-e-Gul" series showcased at Fashion Pakistan Week 2014. She launched her Bridal Wear at the Pakistan Fashion Design Council (PFDC) Loreal Paris Bridal Week 2014 in Lahore, Pakistan, with her debut collection titled "Madhubani".
