= Jean Yu =

American fashion designer

- Born: South Korea
- Education: Fashion Institute of Technology; Metro Academic and Classical High School
- Occupation: fashion designer

Jean Yu is a South Korean born fashion designer operating in New York City. She is a member of Council of Fashion Designers of America (CFDA) since 2007, and was one of the top ten finalists for the CFDA/Vogue fashion fund in 2005.

== Early life and education ==
Yu was born in South Korea but her family eventually moved to the United States and lived in California.

== Career ==
Yu eventually moved in New York to study at the Fashion Institute of Technology. While there, she designed and produced her first dresses for a school project. She took the dress to shops in Soho, where they were picked up and sold. This inspired her to design a line of dresses that eventually earned her the Innovator Design Award from Cotton Incorporated. After 9/11, Yu opened up her own boutique in December 2001.

In 2005, she was named a finalist for the second annual Fashion Fund Award, created by the Council of Fashion Designers of America (CFDA) and Vogue Magazine. In 2007, she was a featured designer at the New York Fashion Exhibition at the Victoria & Albert Museum in London. As well, she was the recipient of Avenuel Designer award as Designer of the Year.

In 2014, she stepped away from lingerie and designed a wardrobe inspired by folk art for the show “Folk Couture: Fashion and Folk Art,” at the American Folk Art Museum.

== Style ==
Jean Yu is known for her architectural approach and seamless technique. Her lingerie have been described as "reinterpreting Old Hollywood glamour with a few innovative design twists."

Her dresses have been featured in many fashion publications such as Vogue (American and many international), Vanity Fair, The New York Times, W. Gwen Stefani was wearing her dress on the cover of the June 2004 edition of the American Vogue.
