= Jenny Hellström =

Swedish businesswoman

- Company logo
- Company type: Public company
- Industry: Fashion
- Founded: Sweden, Stockholm (1997)
- Headquarters: Stockholm
- Key people: Jenny Hellström (Founder)
- Products: Clothing
- Revenue: unknown
- Website: www.jennyhellstrom.com

Jenny Hellström (born 1976 in Hofors, Gästrikland) is both the name of a Swedish designer and her clothing brand. At age 21, she started her own business in 1997, making 1950/1980s-inspired clothing.

Jenny Hellström ran the fashion label Jenny Hellström for 12 years. The brand sold clothing and accessories in 15 countries in more than 150 stores and in the company's last year they grossed 1,5 million Euro. She is widely seen as one of the most inspiring and exciting young designers in the nordic design boom.

The logo of the company consists of a picture of the designer's father.

The company was closed down during July 2008 and is no longer active on the market.

Jenny Hellström has since then worked as a consultant and also written two books: “Sew! From Hood to Shirt Dress” (2013) and “Sew! Urban Collection” (2014) with the aim to inspire others to express themselves, stand up for what they like and pay tribute to the creativity in all of us.
