= Loden Dager =

American fashion designer

- Company type: Privately held
- Industry: Fashion
- Founded: 2006
- Founder: Oliver Helden and Paul Marlow
- Headquarters: 147 West 29th St, 5th fl. New York, NY 10001, New York City, United States
- Key people: Oliver Helden, Designer; Paul Marlow, Designer; Alexander Galan, Partner; Matthew Sandager, Partner; Melissa Vail, Partner
- Products: Luxury goods

Loden Dager is a men’s wear collective based in New York City which debuted in the Fall of 2006. Loden Dager is designed primarily by two Marc Jacobs alumni, Oliver Helden and Paul Marlow. Loden Dager were named finalists for the 2010 CFDA/Vogue Fashion Fund Award, and were featured in Vogue's November 2011 issue. GQ describes their look as "Lower East Side meets rural Peru."

== History ==
Founded in 2006 by two Marc Jacobs alums Oliver Helden and Paul Marlow, Loden Dager won both the Ecco Domani Fashion Foundation award in 2008, and a partnership with Uniqlo through their Designer's Invitation Project. In 2010, the duo were the CFDA/Vogue Fashion Fund Award finalists. Helden is also the director of men's technical design at Marc by Marc Jacobs. Marlow is a consultant for both Marc Jacobs and the wardrobe department of the musical television comedy, Glee.

The Fall 2012 collection was the first designed solely by Paul Marlow, who has assumed full design duties for the brand. Loden Dager designs are available at the Opening Ceremony in New York and Los Angeles, and on their online store.

== Partnership with Uniqlo ==
Uniqlo's Designers Invitation Project is a collaborative project between Uniqlo and successful up-and-coming designers. Loden Dager, who won the partnership in 2008 along with designer Alexander Wang created a six style men's line for the Japanese brand, featuring trousers, polos, shirts and over the knee shorts.

== Fall/Winter 2010 ==
The Fashion Week Fall 2010 show was held at the Audi Forum on Park Avenue in New York City on February 13, 2010.
