= Teri Jon =

American fashion designer

Teri Jon brand is an American luxury design for women's clothing. Rickie Freeman founded Teri Jon (day and eveningwear collections) and JÔN (a sportswear collection). Although Teri Jon is based in New York City, it sold its products to many department and boutiques stores across the U.S. including Bloomingdale's, Neiman Marcus, Nordstroms, Saks Fifth Avenue and Lord and Taylor. In the past, it opened its own stores across the U.S, including in Woodbury Commons, NY and in Dallas, Texas.

The line gained attention in the 2020s as a favorite of former South Carolina governor Nikki Haley, who wore the line's designs in the runup of the 2024 presidential election. Teri Jon designs have also been worn by Darlene Love and Queen Mary of Denmark.
