= Podolyan =

Ukrainian clothing brand

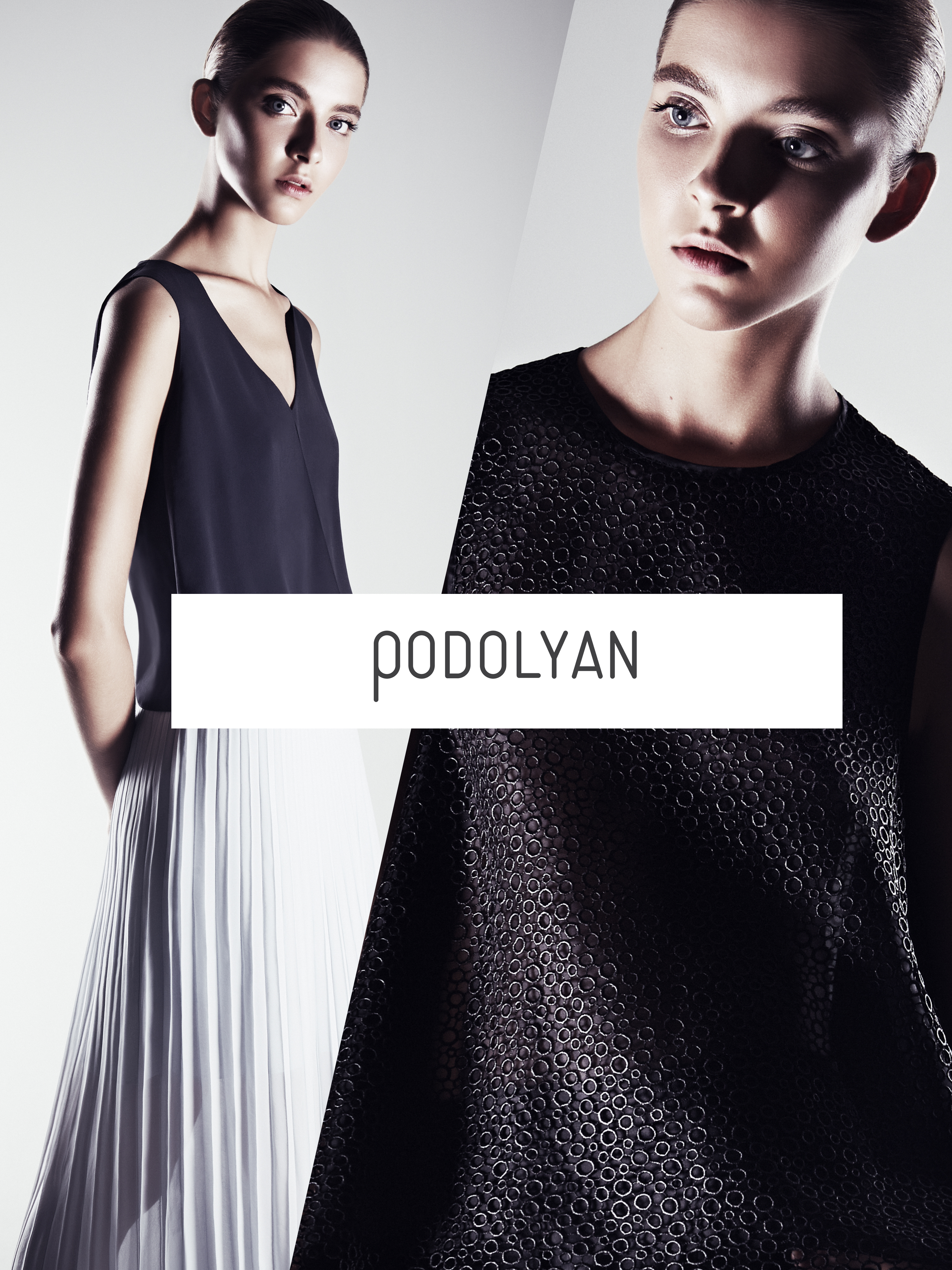
Podolyan

Podolyan is a Ukrainian brand of clothing created by designer Vladymyr Podolyan in 2004.

== History ==
In 2004 Vladymyr Podolyan has graduated Vyacheslav Zaytsev’s Fashion Lab, registered Podolyan brand and has shown his graduate collection during Fashion Seasons in Kyiv. Founder of British concept store Atelier 1 David Foley noticed this collection. The same year first catwalk show of Podolyan took place during Ukrainian Fashion Week – New Names.

In 2005 Vladymyr Podolyan has become one of the two Ukrainian designers who created clothes for English brand Atelier 1 under creative guidance of David Foley. During the years 2006–2009 Vladymyr has created several collections "Podolyan for Atelier 1" that were presented in salon catwalk shows during London Fashion Week.

In March 2010 first independent catwalk show of Podolyan fashion brand took place during Ukrainian Fashion Week. Since then, Podolyan has runway shows twice a year. In 2011, cooperation with Maybelline New York started. During 2012-2014 Podolyan brand won Best Fashion Awards for "Best fashion show performance".

In September 2014, a rebranding of Podolyan took place, and in December the new line Podolyan Black was launched. Kateryna Babkina was the face for Podolyan's "story of a dress" campaign. In April 2015 opening of new Podolyan store in Kyiv took place.

Sometime after 2014, Podolyan had rebranded to PDLN.

== See also ==
- TTSWTRS
