= Oscar Udeshi =

Luxury menswear designer

Oscar Udeshi (born in May 1974 in Hong Kong) is an industrial designer who works in product design, furniture design, jewellery, and clothing - luxury menswear.

Udeshi was born and grew up in the former British colony Hong Kong, and spent his holidays between Asia and Europe. He originally wanted to study architecture at university but did not want to be restricted to one medium. He studied economics at the London School of Economics and then embarked on a career as a banker at a prestigious financial institution in London and Frankfurt. While working in the city, he was searching for the clothes that would make up his ideal wardrobe. Unable to find them, he had his clothes made to his designs and specification. After a serious car crash, Udeshi re-evaluated his path, left finance and completed a master's degree in philosophy. Still unhappy with the clothes he had made for him, and to gain a better insight in to what he was searching for, he studied design and fashion at Central Saint Martins and fashion history and costume illustration at Parsons School of Design Paris. He also trained under one of the last remaining bespoke shirt makers of Jermyn Street.

== Udeshi ==
Oscar Udeshi created his brand "Udeshi" in 1999 and was invited as a rising star to Pitti Uomo in Florence and CPD in Düsseldorf, and as guest designer of SEHM in Paris. He was one of the youngest menswear designers to show his creations on the catwalks of Paris showing at the British Ambassadors Residence in Paris, the same venue in which other fashion icons such as Vivienne Westwood and Sir Paul Smith first started showing. He was the only menswear designer to have his creations shown at the “on the cuff” exhibition, on the history of cufflinks at Goldsmith's Hall in London.

Udeshi's career has seen him design items for the Austrian Army, create a raincoat for a ceremony honouring the 100th anniversary of the Entente Cordiale between France and England, design the Chester Barrie White label collection 2004 and collaborate with Lavenham Quilted Jackets.

To date, there are two Udeshi stores; the first was opened on Davies St in Mayfair, London in 2006 and was followed in 2008 by a second store at Via Monte di Pieta in Milan, Italy. There are plans to open a further twenty stores worldwide and also to expand into e-commerce through the brand's website.

Udeshi garments range from sharp grey suits to colourful paisley jackets made of vintage cloth originally created for scarves and his accessories include purple suede loafers and stingray wallets, but each item has a distinct commonality; namely that nothing is created purely out of aesthetic considerations; there has to be some further value to a design feature.

Both Udeshi's stores cater for bespoke and ready to wear apparel and collections are supported with seasonal lines of accessories and footwear.

Udeshi is an active member of the British menswear industry and was elected youngest chairman of the British Menswear Guild in 2008. He became a board member of the UK Textile and Fashion Association in 2009. He also writes regular columns for the two industry magazines Drapers and Menswear Buyer.
