= Gaby Saliba =

Lebanese fashion designer and hairdresser

Gaby Joseph Saliba (Arabic: غابي صليبا) is a Lebanese fashion designer and hairdresser, noted for his wedding costumes in his range called Gaby Saliba Haute Couture. He owns the fashion house Anfeh in El Koura in northern Lebanon. Saliba's garments regularly feature in women's fashion magazines across the Arab world, including on the cover of Issue 38 of CHOC magazine. In March 2011 he appeared on MTV Lebanon in Window Weddings, discussing his range.
