= Ardistia Dwiasri =

Indonesian born designer

Ardistia Dwiasri (born 1979) is an Indonesian-born designer who is based in New York City with her brand Ardistia New York.

== Early life ==
She received a BS and master's degrees in Manufacturing Engineering in Northeastern University of Boston, and continued her study in fashion design at Parsons School of Design in New York.

Ardistia launched her collection in spring of 2007 and was profiled in WMD as a "designer to watch" in April 2007. She was nominated for the Ready to Wear award from Gen Art Show in May 2007 and won the Winner of Biore or Gen Art Show in October 2007.
