= Cecil Duddley Mends =

Ghanaian fashion designer

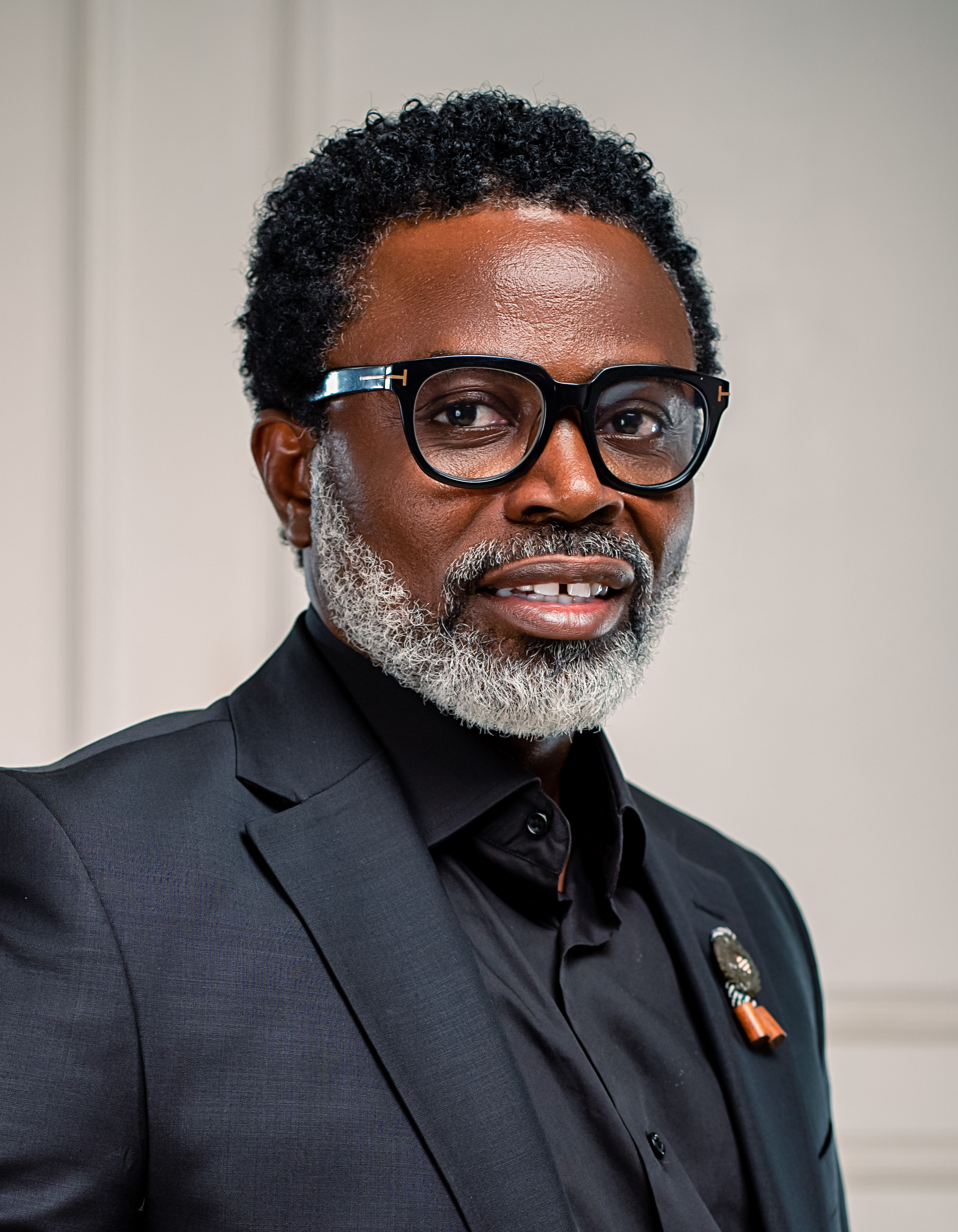
- Cecil Duddley Mends
- Born: February 15, 1975 (age 51); Winneba, Ghana
- Education: University of London
- Occupation: Fashion designer
- Children: Ashira Duddley Mends, Carl Duddley Mends, Augusta Egyirba Mends

Cecil Duddley Mends is a Ghanaian fashion designer and entrepreneur. He is the founder of CDM Fashion Couture and CDM School of Design .

== Early life and education ==
Mends was born and raised in Winneba, Ghana. He is an alumnus of Winneba Senior High School and Yilo Krobo Senior High School. He attended the University of London for his bachelor's degree.

== Career ==
Since completing his education, Mends held various positions in organizations, including Zoomlion Ghana, Japan Motors, and Multimedia Group Limited.

In 2014, he resigned from Multimedia Group Limited and pursued a career as a professional fashion designer. He became the chief executive officer of CDM Fashion Couture, which manufactures high-end clothing and academic gowns, and founded the CDM School of Design.

Gowns and designs created by CDM Fashion Couture have been worn by prominent leaders, such as Ghanaian President Nana Akufo-Addo and Gambian President Adama Barrow.

In response to the COVID-19 pandemic, the company diversified its production to include face masks, aiming to contribute to the efforts in mitigating the spread of the virus.

== Recognition ==
| Year | Nominee / work | Award | Result | Ref |
|---|---|---|---|---|
| 2017 | Best Fashion Designer | Ghana Peace Awards | Won | |
| 2023 | Innovative Fashion Brand of the Year | 2nd National Brands Innovation Awards | Won | |
| 2023 | Fashion Brand Business Leader of the Year | 2nd National Brands Innovation Awards | Won | |
| 2023 | Fashion Designer of the Year | Ghana Leadership Awards | Won | |
