= Gaby Jouval =

Swiss fashion designer and entrepreneur of French origin

Gaby Jouval (January 17, 1892 – June 26, 1946) was a Swiss fashion designer and entrepreneur of French origin. In the 1940s, her models set the fashion trends in Switzerland and were followed abroad. Her full name was Gabrielle Antoinette Desirée Schuppisser-Jouval. She was recruited by a Zürich hat manufacturer while she was in Munich learning German and went to Zürich in 1915 to work with Claire Bouissou. She worked at the company called Bliss in Zürich designing hats for Claire Bouissou. She opened her own haute couture in 1930 and employed between 70 and 80 employees. It was common for customers to fly from abroad to her shop. She married Willy Schuppisser in 1940 and he worked in the business as well. When Jouval died after a cerebral hemorrhage and coma, her husband ran the business until he gave it up in the 1950s.
