= Lea Seong =

South Korean born fashion designer

- Occupation: Fashion designer

Korean name
- Hangul: 성수연
- Hanja: 成受燕
- RR: Seong Suyeon
- MR: Sŏng Suyŏn

Lea Seong is a South Korean born fashion designer.

== Education ==
Seong graduated from Chung-Ang University in South Korea and has a bachelor's degree from Parsons School of Design in New York City.

== Career ==
Combining both Asian and Western styles, she created her own fashion brand "Lea Seong" in Shanghai in 2008. Since then, she has presented her collections at China Fashion Week. Seong has worked at Calvin Klein in New York to becoming the first foreign member of the China Fashion Designers Association. She has also been granted the China Fashion Week S/S 2009 and S/S 2010 Special Designer's Award.

== Designs ==
Incorporating milk fabric into her designs, she made her debut in South Korea with her women's wear collection at the Pret-a-Porter Busan in late November, 2009. Her achievement has upgraded her as the Officer of Korea Model Association for International Cultural Cooperation.
