= Jenny Gordy =

American fashion designer

- Occupation: Designer
- Known for: pattern design

Jenny Gordy is an American fashion designer and patternmaker based in Portland, Oregon. She is best known as the owner of Wiksten, a sewing and knitting pattern company.

== Biography ==
Gordy grew up in Kansas and learned to sew from her grandmother. In elementary school she started selling handmade items over the lunch hour in her school cafeteria, and by 15 she knew she wanted to be a fashion designer. She went on to eventually study patternmaking at the Fashion Institute of Technology in New York.

Wiksten was launched as a clothing line in 2004. Gordy named the company after her Scandinavian grandparents who inspired her creativity and interest in handmade items. As the popularity of her clothing line grew, Gordy found her small-scale approach to design and sewing unsustainable. She eventually shifted to producing patterns for home sewists that mirrored the simple, modern aesthetic of the clothing she sold.

One of her best known patterns is the Haori, a Japanese inspired jacket that was first published in 2017 in Making. Originally released under the name Kimono Jacket, Gordy changed the name to the Haori in 2018 following cultural appropriation concerns raised by members of the online sewing community. Among them was educator Emi Ito who has called on a number of design companies to change imprecise design names that conflate distinct items of clothing with the kimono itself. In an announcement about the name change, Wiksten explained: "We want to acknowledge our mistake in the original naming of this pattern, and thank you for welcoming it into the world with its new and better-suited name."

Gordy lives in Portland with her family. She works in a studio next to her home where the business is run with the assistance of two employees.

Gordy discontinued using Instagram in 2020, and her website is no longer active.
