= Maya Bash =

Israeli fashion designer

- מאיה בש
- Born: 1979 (age 46–47)
- Education: Shenkar College of Engineering and Design
- Occupation: Fashion Designer

Maya Bash (Hebrew: מאיה בש; born in 1979) is an Israeli fashion designer.

She immigrated to Israel from Russia and established the Maya Bash brand in 2005.

== Biography ==
Bash was born in 1979 in Russia. In 1991 her family emigrated to Israel. She studied at Shenkar College of Engineering and Design. After graduation, she opened a shop in the Gan HaHashmal district in Tel Aviv.

The Maya Bash brand offers unisex urban clothing, inspired by the designer's childhood in the former Soviet Union as well as her urban lifestyle in Tel Aviv. The brand's collections are produced locally.

Bash has worked with film director Max Lomberg, painter Anna Lukashevsky, and photographer David Meskhi.

In a collaboration with Israeli visual artist Zoya Cherkassky, she has also designed clothing using fabric with patterns showing people wearing her clothes.

Following the designer's presentation at Paris Fashion Week, her clothing is sold in a few shops in Japan, Italy, Russia, Denmark, the Netherlands and the United States.
