= Emily Miles =

African American fashion designer in NJ

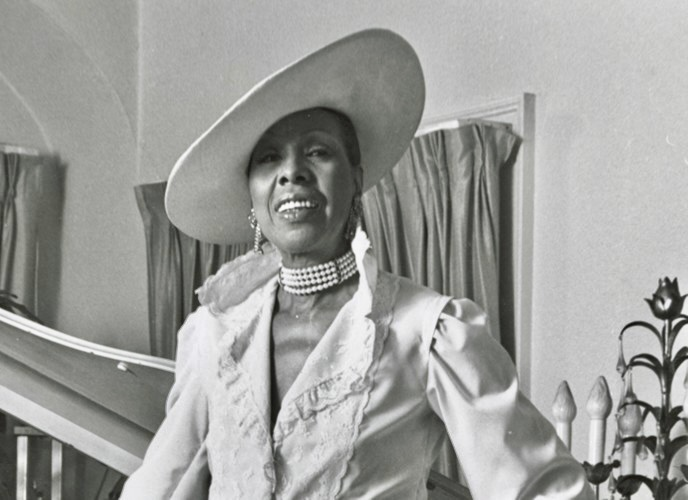
- Born: Emma Rollins; July 31, 1910; Chattanooga, Tennessee, U.S.
- Died: June 11, 1999 (aged 88); Newark, New Jersey

Emily Miles (July 31, 1910-June 11, 1999) was an African American fashion designer and entrepreneur. She was considered Newark, New Jersey's "first lady of fashion" and "the grand dame of black style in Newark". In 1998, she was inducted into the New Jersey Women's Hall of Fame and the Chicago Fashion Hall of Fame. Miles was a board member of the Harlem Fashion Institute under its founder Lois K. Alexander. She was an active member of The National Association of Fashion and Accessory Designers (NAFAD). On September 17, 2023, the City of Newark presented Newark's Fashion Forward and Unity Week and paid tribute to the Iconic Emily Miles at a Fashion Gala held at The Newark Museum of Art in downtown Newark.

== Early life ==
Emily Miles was born Emma Rollins on July 31, 1910, in Chattanooga, Tennessee, the second of ten children. As a child she made doll clothes, which she said was the start of her fashion career. She graduated from Central High School in Newark in August 1929. Miles attended Howard University. After graduating Howard she modeled for Philadelphia designer Ann Franks as well as internationally, including serving as a stand-in for Josephine Baker, marrying businessman Milton Miles on her travels. She then attended various fashion schools in New York City including Pratt Institute, Parsons School of Design and Fashion Institute. She began designing hats and in 1952 she won the Paper-Dress Ball in Newark sponsored by the NAACP.

== Charm school ==
After graduating from school in New York Miles bought up a 22 room mansion in Newark (803 South 10th Street, between Madison and Clinton Avenues) with a small studio for design and opened "Belle Meade Charm School". The Charm School trained more than 1,000 women and girls including Whitney Houston and was open for almost fifty years. It was called "one of the most enduring establishments in the New York City area" under the direction of Lucille Hicks. The Belle Meade School of Charm and Modeling was active as a modeling agency as early as 1950. Some Belle Meade alums included Millie Clark Lewis (commentator), Cecilia Johnson (Designer), Loretta Brooks (grade schoolteacher), and Sydney James, who went on to model for some of the leading fashions house in Paris, as well as other European fashion capitals.

== Fashion career ==
Besides her charm school, Miles continued to design fashion and organize shows. She was most famous for her hats and by 1983 her traveling fashion shows were booked two years out. She stated "a woman's outfit was always incomplete without a...hat". She showed her designs many times in the Ebony Fashion Fair. She also had annual shows (the last Sunday in February "Black History Month") in downtown Newark at The Robert Treat Hotel grand ballroom and the Terrance ballroom. She also produced fashion shows and shared the stage with prominent names. She was a long-time collaborator with Fashion Maven, Marie Westbrook Levens, a Couture Seamstress and Dressmaker who lived in Newark and once operated her own dress shop and couture label "It Has To Be You" in Maplewood, NJ. In 1962 in Merchantville, NJ she co-hosted the "Ella Fitzgerald and Emily Miles Luncheon and Fashion Show". She has been featured in various books about African American fashion including African American Dress and Adornment: a Cultural Perspective, Black and Beautiful: How Women of Color Changed the Fashion Industry and Skin Deep: Inside the World of Black Fashion Models. "What Miles produces", wrote one New Jersey newspaperwoman, "is a personal extravaganza, a production in which all the clothes are her own designs, all the models trainees or graduates of her own Belle Meade Modeling School".
