= Christos Costarellos =

Greek fashion designer

Christos Costarellos is an Athens-based Greek fashion designer, head of the Costarellos brand, and best known for the dress worn by Carrie Symonds for her May 2021 wedding to British prime minister Boris Johnson.

Costarellos was born in Düsseldorf, Germany, to parents who both worked in the fashion business, his mother a seamstress and father a tailor.

He studied fashion design at Dimitrelis School of Fashion in Greece, followed by a master's degree in theatre costume design at the London College of Fashion. He started his own label, Costarellos, in 1998.

Symonds rented a Costarellos dress, which normally retails at £2,830 for £45, from MyWardrobe HQ.
