= Ian & Marcel =

Canadian fashion designers

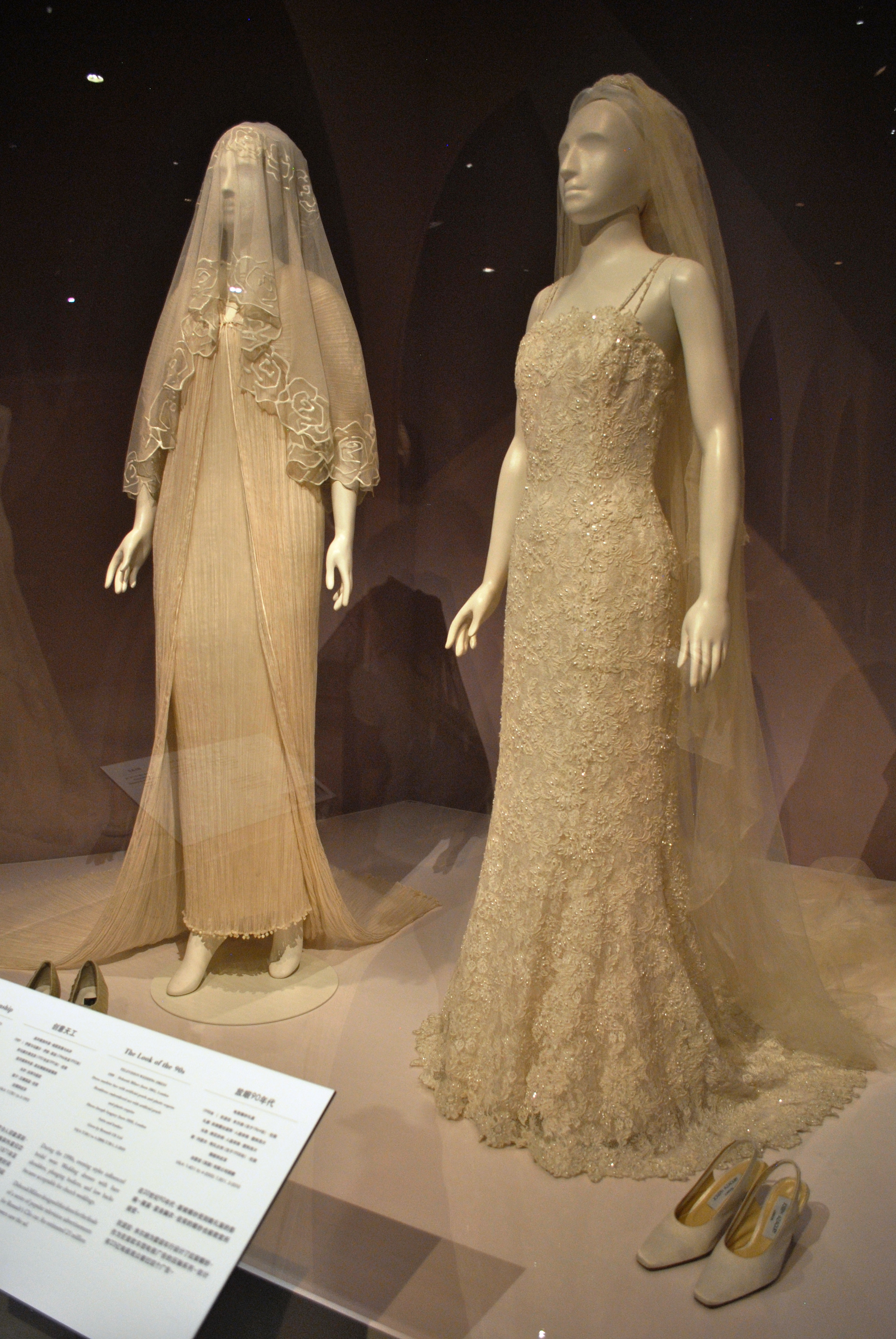
A Wedding Dress (left) designed by Ian & Marcel

Ian H. Cooper (January 1946 - 1992) and Marcel B. Aucoin (1951 - 1991) were Canadian fashion designers who founded "Ian & Marcel" in 1979.

== Early life ==
Ian H. Cooper and Marcel B. Aucoin were born in Canada where they also studied and were trained in the fashion field. They met in 1976 in Toronto. Cooper studied Fashion Design at Ryerson Polytechnic Institute and Aucoin studied Home and Textile Design at Sheridan School of Design.

Later, in England, Cooper obtained an M.D. in Fashion at the Saint Martin's School of Art.

== Career ==
Ian H. Cooper and Marcel B. Aucoin moved together to London and in 1979 founded their own company "Ian & Marcel". Their trademark were hand-painted garments and pleated silks. The pleated silk was inspired by fashion designer Mariano Fortuny, of whom they saw an exhibition in 1980 at the Brighton Museum & Art Gallery.

Ian & Marcel also developed a silicone rubber and silk technique not only as stitch-free seams and hems but also as decorative elements. In 1986 they patented their method, but the patent was not renewed at their death and expired in 1993.

== Personal life ==
Both Cooper and Aucoin died due to AIDS related illnesses, Cooper in 1992 and Aucoin in 1991.

== Legacy ==
In 1992 Ian & Marcel donated many of their models to the Victoria and Albert Museum.

Lady Holly Rumbold and Elizabeth Vernon wrote Ian and Marcel: Hand Painted and Pleated Silks (1993). According to Lady Rumbold "Ian & Marcel reminded us of medieval knights, whose quest was for beauty’s perfection. They consecrated their lives to their art and the realisation of their ideals, with the same single-mindedness and fervour of Parsifal in pursuit of the Holy Grail".
