= Caroline Zoe Schumm =

American fashion designer

Caroline Zoe Schumm (Zoe) (born May 27, 1988) is a Supply Chain Professor, fashion designer, and entrepreneur. Her maiden name is Caroline Zoe Waggoner.

Zoe grew up in Hutchinson, Kansas. She attended Kansas State University from 2006 to 2011 with a dual major in Apparel & Textile design and Apparel Marketing and a minor in business. While at Kansas State, Zoe was awarded Outstanding Senior in her field, won a national design competition, and also won various regional design competitions. In college, Zoe studied the effects that mainstream fashion manufacturing had in countries where it was produced, including the prevalence of child labor, very low wages, inhumane working conditions, and environmental pollution. She continued pursuing those studied, obtaining a masters degree and Ph.D. from Iowa State University. In 2024, one of her seminal works, Closed loop supply chains in apparel: Current state and future directions, was named the top SDG article by FT50.com.

== Design career ==
In 2012, Schumm and her husband created 4 All Humanity, a fair trade apparel company.

== Awards ==
- 2013, 4 All Humanity won the national Eco-excellence in Fashion Award, from Natural Child World.
- 2014, Zoe won Emerging Entrepreneur of the Year, from the Kansas Small Business Development Center.
- 2019, Zoe won the Distinguished Service Award from the College of Health and Human Sciences at Kansas State University.
