= Vanessa Alfaro =

Bolivian designer, entrepreneur, model and actress

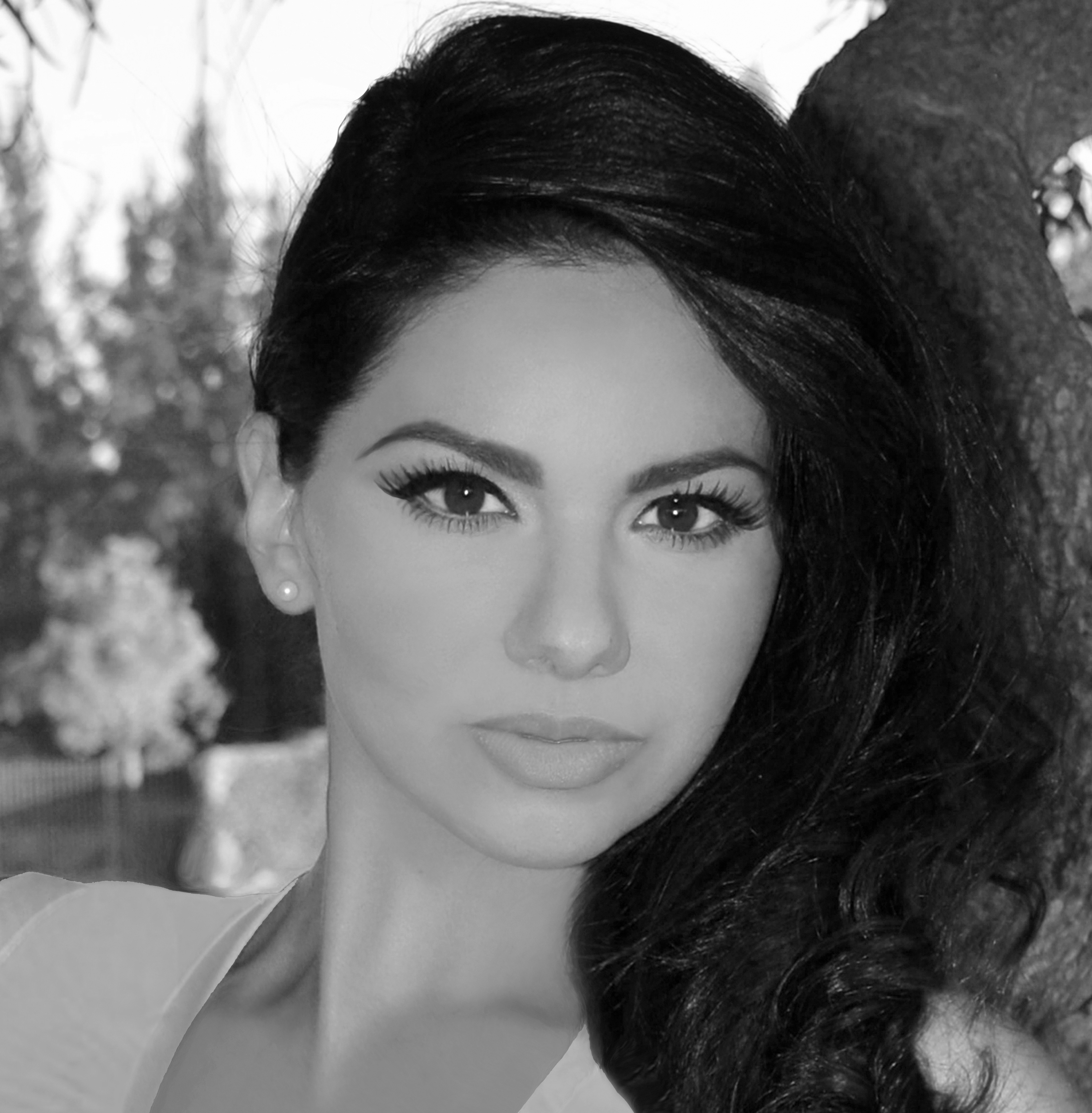

Vanessa Alfaro is a Bolivian designer, entrepreneur, model and actress based in Los Angeles, California. Alfaro is the president and CEO of Sonne Global Inc., a company dedicated to design, creation, brand licensing, marketing and publicity. Alfaro created the only women's ready-to-wear line for FIFA during the 2014 World Cup in Brazil. She has been the only designer to work with FIFA for a woman's line using official logos of the World Cup.

Alfaro began modeling in Bolivia at 17 years old. She had an active career as an editorial and runway model, and was also crowned with various beauty pageant titles including "Most Photogenic" and "The most beautiful between models."

At 19 years old, Alfaro created Sonne Imagen & Production in Cochabamba, Bolivia, while she was still a Commercial Engineering student at The Catholic University in Bolivia. She graduated with honors and went on to earn a Masters in Finance. She also specialized in graphic and fashion design. When Alfaro was 24 years old, she married and moved to the United States. Once in the U.S., she continued as a designer, model, actress and singer.

== Career ==
Alfaro appeared in numerous roles in music videos, TV and movies including Usher's music video "Hey Daddy" and on Nickelodeon's ICarly with actor Jack Black.

At the end of 2013, Alfaro created the first and only women's clothing line licensed by FIFA for the 2014 World Cup.

Alfaro is the CEO and founder of Vanessa Alfaro Bridal & Couture. The company designs and produces couture and bridal collections. In addition she started the fashion brand CHIVANE.
