= Nicola Finetti =

Italian Australian fashion designer

Nicola Finetti is an Australian fashion designer known for his eponymous fashion label, launched in 1995.

Born in Bari, Italy, he studied architecture in Rome before emigrating to Australia in 1984.
