= Marvin Oduber =

Dutch financial advisor and entrepreneur

- Born: March 12, 1976 (age 50); Enschede, Netherlands
- Education: Scholengemeenschap Zuid

Marvin Oduber (born March 12, 1976) is a Dutch financial advisor and entrepreneur based in Amsterdam.

== Career ==
In 1996 Oduber started modelling in Aruba, and the next year he was signed by renowned Dutch modelling agency Touche Models and appeared the following year on the cover of the agencies model book. Oduber studied business economics and in 2001 he founded an award-winning Financial Advice agency in the Netherlands. Oduber is one of the co-founders of mortgage-tech company Elaine.
