= Amanda Phelan =

American fashion designer

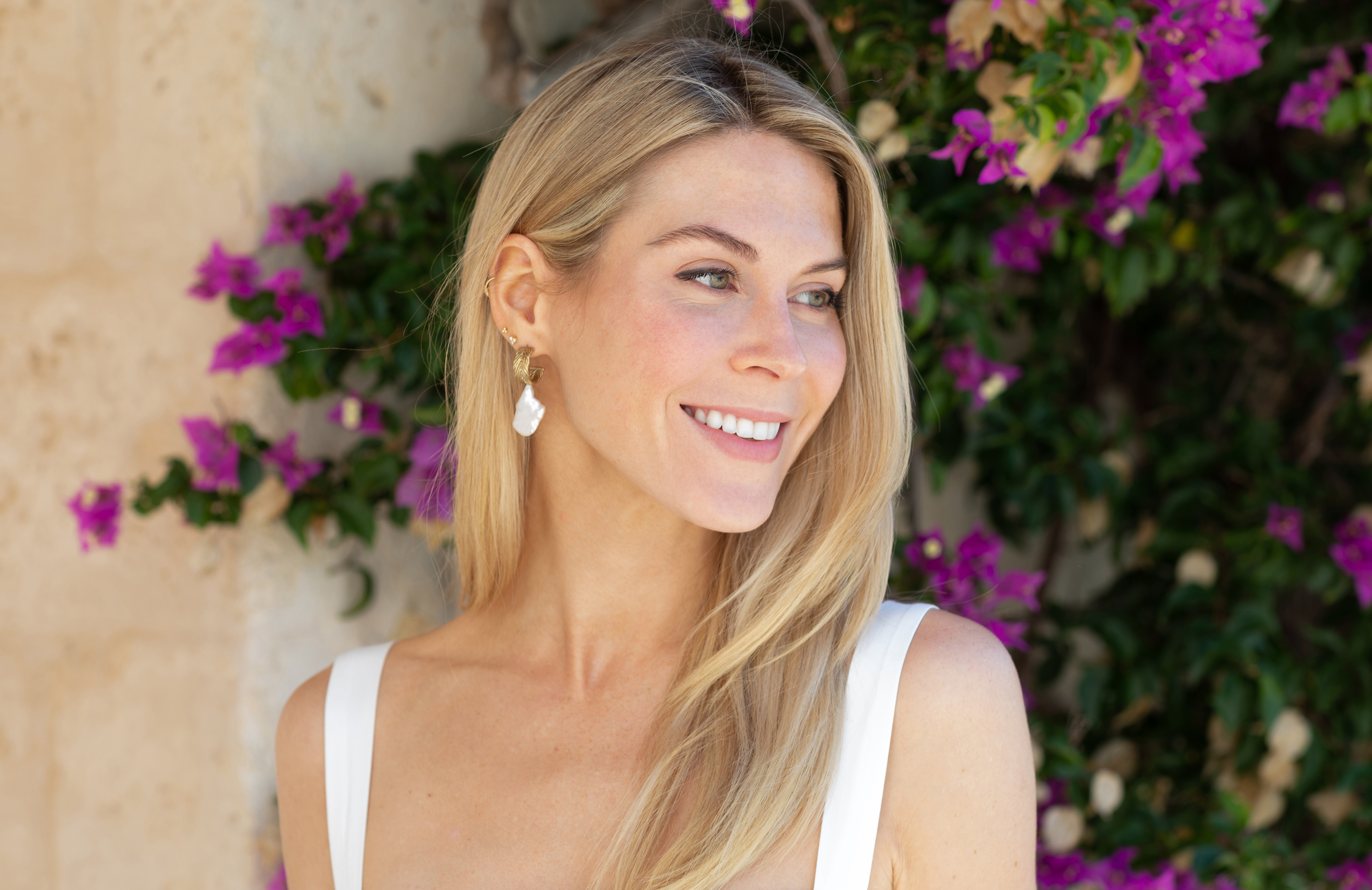

Amanda Phelan is a New York-based creative who works across many disciplines and media as a director, producer, designer and textile engineer. Phelan's textile work is noted for a high level of technical virtuosity and advanced material fabrication research. Drawing on her shared passions for pattern, rhythm, visual and performing arts, her creative direction echoes a life-affirming spirit and strives to inspire and connect progressive audiences. She debuted her fashion label in September 2015 New York Fashion Week to critical acclaim. She is based out of Brooklyn, New York.

== Early life and education ==
An accomplished dancer and artist, Phelan attended the prestigious Rhode Island School of Design, where she studied painting before completing a degree in textiles. While at RISD, her degree focused on the engineering of both woven and knitted structures.

== Career ==
Phelan started her professional career designing knitwear for Alexander Wang. As an emerging designer, Phelan has distinguished herself by her unusual performance based runway shows, and forward thinking textile fabrications. Her Fall 2016 Ready to Wear show was described as "thoughtful, progressive and daring". In interviews, Phelan has suggested that these events are a deliberate attempt to disrupt the standard presentation format, and introduce conceptual content aligned with her materials. She has also been noted for a high level of technical virtuosity and use of complex fabrics. Phelan's runway shows for New York Fashion Week to date have been collaborative performance based events with the Vim Vigor Dance Theater Company, and were hosted at La MaMa Experimental Theatre Club in Manhattan's Lower East Side. In 2018, Phelan exhibited her first work at the Museum of Modern Art as part of the Items: Is Fashion Modern? exhibition, which featured 111 items of clothing that have had a strong impact on the world in the 20th and 21st centuries.
