= Christian Lagerwaard =

Dutch fashion designer

- Born: 15 October 1964 (age 61); Krefeld, Germany
- Label: Christian Lagerwaard (since 1985)
- Awards: Prix Guy Laroche

Christian Lagerwaard (born Christian Dirk Lagerwaard, 15 October 1964) is a Dutch fashion designer. He has his own Fashion Label (Christian Lagerwaard), under which he has previously worked for the Royal Dutch Family, Princess Laurentien of the Netherlands in particular.
