= Kathy Kemp =

American fashion designer

Kathy Kemp (born August 15, 1964) is an American women's clothing designer and owner of the Anna store in the East Village neighborhood of New York City. A Pennsylvania native, she moved to New York in 1995 to start her company. Her background in anthropology and years of watching people try on clothes have afforded her an expert eye for what her customers want. She is best known for her "edgy dresses with a girlish bent," and her blouses, which won the Village Voice Best of New York award for Best Blouses in 2001. She has been called "Gen Y's Diane von Fürstenberg," creating wearable and flattering pieces at affordable prices. She was one of the first designers to utilize local independent contractors to produce small runs weekly, keeping her customers happy with new styles while maintaining a minimal carbon footprint.
