= Christian Cota =

Mexican fashion designer

Christian Cota is a Mexican fashion designer.

== Background ==
Cota was born in Mexico City in 1983. He studied painting in Paris before moving to New York City. While there, he attended Parsons School of Design and graduated in 2005 with a BA in Fine Arts, specializing in hand embroideries. When he finished school, he started work as an assistant to the fashion designer Angel Sanchez.

Christian Cota launched his first collection in September 2007. Style.com named Cota one of their “Ten Newcomers to Watch” in 2007. The success of his next two shows, FW 2008 and SS 2009, garnered him the Fashion Group International's Women's Ready to Wear Rising Star Award in January 2009. Cota was a finalist with seven others in the Council of Fashion Designers of America and Vogue fashion fund in July 2010.
