= Salim al-Shimiri =

Iraqi fashion designer

Salim al-Shimiri (born in Basra, Iraq) is an Iraqi fashion designer. His job entails selecting the fabrics used, the models, positioning the lighting for runway shows as well as creating the garments. He graduated at Baghdad University with a degree in microbiology, he later returned to study art. He has held many fashion shows in Iraq, notably the 1991 show in the Palestine Hotel which was attended by United Nations delegation visiting Iraq, and impressed by his designs they offered him contacts and addresses of fashion houses in the United States and Europe. Before 2003, Salim was quite successful in Iraq, however, the toppling of Saddam Hussein and his regime resulted in loss of revenue and clients for him.

He has also stated to have been assaulted by gunmen, where 11 attackers raided his home, cursed at him for being a designer, beat him and stole about $50,000 in cash and jewelry.

The current Iraq war has made business for Salim increasingly difficult with many fashion designers and liberal people fleeing Iraq.

On the fashion of Iraq, he states: "The 1980s were the golden years for fashion," he says. "The Middle Ages were better than today."
