= Oscar G. Lopez =

Cuban couture fashion designer (born 1973)

Oscar Garcia-Lopez (born in 1973) is a Cuban couture fashion designer living in South Florida (as at when this article was written). Since he immigrated to the U.S. in 2004, he has constantly been working on growing his clientele and expanding his brand. His career took off in 2013 when he competed and was the winner of Project Runway: Under The Gunn Season 1. In July 2019, Oscar designed multiple garments for Lara Trump, the wife of Eric Trump.

== Early life ==
Oscar Garcia-Lopez was born in Havana, Cuba, in 1973 and discovered his love for design at the early age of eight.

At the age of twelve, he created his first dress with his mother's curtains due to the scarce resources found on the island. He created not only garments but also the tools needed to make them. He recalls "sharpening [his] needles with nail files and candle wax… only able to replace them when family members or friends would visit not only from the United States but from the European community as well."

After leaving Cuba in 2000, Oscar spent four years in Mexico pursuing a musical career. In 2004 he made his way to Coral Gables, Florida where he began building his brand and his clientele.

== Career ==
In 2013, Lopez decided to participate in the Project Runway spinoff Under the Gunn, hosted by Tim Gunn. He won the competition and $100,000.

Renowned costume designer and stylist Jen Rade praised his designs, describing them as "Fabulous and light years above and beyond everything else she has seen on the runway. Co-judge and Senior Fashion Editor at Marie Claire USA, Zanna Roberts Rassi also pointed out one of his designing aptitudes – "You have a very refined way of constructing garments that make them look very expensive." During the season finale, guest judge, supermodel, and Project Runway host Heidi Klum also said it had been a long time since she had the honor of knowing a designer with so much talent.

According to his mentor on the show, Nick Verreos, he was seen cleaning out his space, sweeping the workroom floor, and even helping out his opponents when he was done with his work.

Oscar had one of the highest scores on 6 challenges, 3 of which he won as well.
