= Maheen Khan (Bangladeshi fashion designer) =

Bangladeshi businessperson

- Occupation: Fashion designer
- Years active: 1986 – present
- Known for: Founding Mayasir

Maheen Khan is a pioneer in the design industry of Bangladesh, known for creating a market for garments featuring local traditional designs. She is the managing director and founder of Mayasir. She is also the founding chair of Fashion Design Council of Bangladesh.

== Early life and education ==
Maheen Khan was born in a family associated with clothing design. Her father had a career in textiles in the 1950s and her mother worked extensively for local weavers in Bangladesh. Khan completed her Bachelor of Fine Arts (BFA) in textiles from Otis College of Art and Design. She completed her graduation in Textile from Parsons School of Design in California, USA.

== Work ==
Maheen Khan started her career as chief design coordinator in Arong in 1986. She left Arong in 2001 and established her own fashion house Mayasir Limited. Local fabrics such as khadi, cotton, silk and muslin are used in Mayasir's products, which has its own garment factory. Mayasir took part in bridal couture extravaganza Bridal Asia in New Delhi in 2008. Khan is a founding chair of Arts Council Dhaka, which advocates and promotes Bengal art. While on fellowship, she met with fashion designers; examined heritage textiles; studied folk arts promotion and related social enterprises; and visited museums and galleries featuring Central and South Asian Collections and Native American Arts. Khan writes a regular column on design and heritage crafts for the Amader Kotha, a women-based portal. She writes a regular column on design and heritage crafts for The Daily Star. She has served as President of Fashion Design Council of Bangladesh (FDCB)

== Achievements ==
- Bridal Asia Show in New Delhi India in 2008
- Eisenhower Fellowship 2012
