= Pimdao Sukhahuta =

Thai fashion designer

Pimdao "Pim" Sukhahuta (born in 1979) is a Thai fashion designer and the creative director of Sretsis. Sretsis (or sisters spell backward), is the fashion brand that was invented by the three sisters, Pim, Kly and Matina Sukhahuta, in 2002. Pim is the middle sister.

== Career ==
She graduated from the Parsons School of Design in New York in 2003, with a degree in fashion design. She opened a store.

She did an internship with Mark Jacobs.
