= Eric Raisina =

Malagasy-Cambodian fashion designer

Eric Raisina is a fashion designer based in Siem Reap, Cambodia.

== Early life ==
He was born in Madagascar and studied fashion in Paris, and later worked for Yves Saint Laurent and Christian Lacroix. His collections focus on texture and color, and are featured in the Paris shows as well as sold at a boutique in the city. He moved to Siem Reap after a visit in 1996, during which he was inspired by the local silk weavers and their ancient techniques. His designs have attracted celebrities including Anne Bass and Angelina Jolie.
