= Beverly Feldman =

American shoe designer

Beverly Feldman is an American shoe designer.

== Biography ==
Feldman was born and raised in Massachusetts. She grew up in a small New England town and trained as a shoe illustrator and designer at the Pratt Institute inNew York, graduating in 1965.

After graduating, Feldman became an art director for the fashion consultant Doris Weston. In the 1970s, Feldman was a designer for I. Miller and was subsequently a design director for both Pankin and Andrew Geller.

At the age of 31, she opened her own business, Lucky Lizard Trading Company, based in Alicante, Spain.

In 2016, her brand gained increased media visibility after the British prime minister, Theresa May, started to wear her Caliente model.
