= Isa Tapia =

American fashion designer

Isa Tapia is a New York–based shoe and accessories designer from San Juan, Puerto Rico, who launched her eponymous footwear line in 2012. She came to prominence at Oscar de la Renta as his apprentice during her senior year at Parsons School of Design.

In 2014, Tapia was part of the CFDA incubator program for new designer brands and won the Target design challenge . She was inducted into the Council of Fashion Designers of America in 2016.
