= Wendi Reed =

American fashion designer

Wendi Reed is an American fashion designer based in New York. Raised on Long Island, she studied Interior Design at the Fashion Institute of Technology. She currently designs Wendi Reed, a womenswear and menswear line which shows during New York Fashion Week.

== History ==
Wendi Reed began her career as a designer in 2001 after opening a lifestyle/home decor boutique in Brooklyn, New York with her husband Matt Reed. Looking to add another dimension to the store, Reed created a line of handmade, one-of-a-kind sweaters constructed from her vast collection of vintage clothing. Reed's combinations of textures and patterns became the calling card of The Reeds collection, which was soon carried by Barneys New York.

The demand for these unique pieces led to the creation of the Wendi Reed collection, a wholesale knitwear line of menswear and womenswear, which was launched in the Fall of 2008. The collection is currently carried by Barneys New York, Nordstrom and various specialty stores and boutiques across the U.S., Europe, and Japan. The Wendi Reed Fall 2009 collection was featured in Vol. 87 of Gap Press and Vol. 18 of Gap Press Men.

For Spring 2010, Wendi Reed continued to enhance her designs using hand-stitching and deconstructed details. The womenswear collection included touches of gingham, lace and feminine whimsy, while the men's collection took inspiration from both traditional menswear construction and vintage collegiate styles, bringing a hip edge to a classic look. The show was covered by firstview.com and one of the men's cardigans was featured in the April 2010 issue of the Japanese magazine Free&Easy.

For Fall 2010, Wendi Reed expanded her collection to include wovens (blouses, skirts and dresses) for women and was featured in Women’s Wear Daily. The Wendi Reed website, wendireed.com is set to launch in April 2010.
