= Jamal Taslaq =

Palestinian-Italian fashion designer

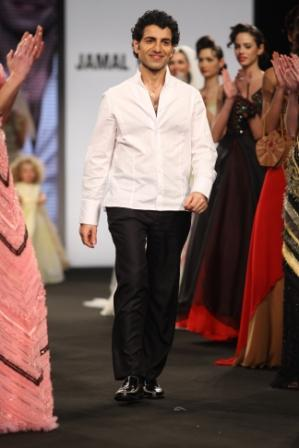
- Born: February 27, 1970 (age 56); Nablus, Palestine
- Education: Florence Fashion Academy
- Label: Jamal Taslaq
- Website: www.jamaltasaq.com

Jamal Taslaq (born 1970) is a Palestinian high fashion designer living and working in Italy. His style blends Eastern and Western clothing codes.

== Biography ==
Taslaq was born in Nablus in 1970. After high school, he studied design in Jordan. He left for Italy in 1990 where he studied fashion. He founded his eponymous atelier in Rome in 1999.

His work has been displayed at Fashion for Peace, Fashion in the Mediterranean, Fundraising for the needy, UNICEF fashion show for the children.

== Exhibitions ==
Selected exhibitions where his work has been presented

- Apr. 2011 – Ramallah, Palestine
- Dec. 2010 – Marrakech, Morocco - fashion Day Morocco during Festival International du Film de Marrakech
- Apr. 2010 - Amman, Jordan - High Fashion Show at Four Seasons Hotel
- Feb. 2009 – Rome, Italy - High Fashion Show
- Dec. 2009 - Sorrento, Italy – In the setting of the High life of Italy
- Nov. 2009 – Kuala Lumpur, Malaysia - in the presence of the King and Queen
- Jun. 2009 – Florence, Italy - Fashion Show
- Feb. 2008 – Rome, Italy, AltaRoma AltaModa High Fashion Show

He has dressed famous Italian singers on television and prime concerts and festivals.
