= Georg Lux =

German fashion designer

- Born: January 21, 1985 (age 41); Berlin, Germany
- Occupation: Fashion designer
- Title: Creative director of Leonard

Georg Lux (born 21 January 1985 in Berlin) is a German fashion designer.

In January 2021, he was appointed creative director of the French fashion luxury house of Leonard.

== Biography ==
Georg Lux has had a passion for fashion and drawing since his childhood, that led him, as a teenager, to push the doors of the boutique of the Berlin fashion collector and antique dealer, Josefine von Krepl. As a student, he spent all his free time with her and helped her to found the Fashion Museum of Castle Meyenburg.

After a literary baccalaureate, he joined the Fashion School of Lette-Verein in Berlin in 2004, from which he graduated in styling and creation in 2007. Diploma in hand, he moved to Paris where he completed his studies at the Ecole de la Chambre Syndicale de la Couture Parisienne in 2008.

He became the assistant to the creator of Requiem, a little fashion house member of the Fédération de la Haute Couture et de la Mode, which he left at the end of 2011. The French fashion house of Tara Jarmon then hired him as head designer and entrusted him the label's eveningwear line and the illustration of its lookbooks.

In the fall of 2020, he joined the French fashion house of Leonard, which presented him to the press on 5 January 2021, as its new creative director. He presented his first Leonard Fall-Winter 2021 pre-collection on 19 January 2021, then his Leonard Fall-Winter 2021 collection on 5 March 2021 during Paris Fashion Week. Determined to highlight the wealth of know-how in French couture craftsmanship, he considers the preservation of these living heritage as one of the contemporary missions of the luxury fashion houses.
