= Og Okonkwo =

- Born: Ogugua Okonkwo; Enugu, Nigeria
- Citizenship: Nigerian
- Education: Laboratory Science
- Alma mater: University of Nigeria, Nsukka
- Occupation: Fashion designer
- Years active: 2012–present
- Organization: Style Temple
- Known for: Founder of Style Temple; contemporary womenswear design
- Notable work: Style Temple collections; Lagos Fashion and Design Week showcases
- Title: Founder and Creative Director, Style Temple
- Awards: The Future Awards Africa Prize for Fashion (2016); EbonyLife Sisterhood Award for Fashion (2017)

Ogugua Okonkwo, popularly known as Og Okonkwo, is a Nigerian womenswear designer, fashionista, and the founder and creative director of the fashion brand Style Temple.

== Biography ==
Okonkwo was raised in Enugu, Nigeria, and she studied laboratory science at the University of Nigeria, Nsukka before delving into fashion design. Okonkwo launched Style Temple in 2012, after long stints training as a fashion assistant and junior designer at a few Abuja-based fashion labels.

== Fashion ==
Style Temple, under Okonkwo's leadership, showcases its collection annually at the Lagos Fashion and Design Week. The brand has been hailed by Vogue, Fashion Bomb Daily, Elle, Glamour, and CNN for its visionary take on womenswear.

== Awards and nominations ==
- The Future Awards Africa Prize for Fashion, 2016
- Ebony Live Sisterhood Award Prize for Fashion, 2017
