= Satoshi Kondo =

Director and head designer for Japanese fashion brand Issey Miyake

Satoshi Kondo (born 1984) is the artistic. director and head designer for Japanese fashion brand Issey Miyake.

== Early life ==
Kondo was raised in Kyoto, Japan. His mother was a sewing teacher; his home was filled with patterns and designs. He graduated from the Ueda College of Fashion and graduated from its Fashion Creator Industry Masters program. He was awarded the Soen Magazine Award.

== Career ==
Kondo has been with Issey Miyake for many years. Prior to becoming the artistic director of the fashion house he had previously served in other roles at the company, namely in the Pleats Please and Homme Plisse divisions.

Kondo replaced Yoshiyuki Miyamae as design director in 2019. His first show for the house for the 2020 spring/summer women's collection featuring "floaty bodysuits" and "Helicoptering dresses" emerged a viral sensation.

Kondo’s design inspiration is the Japanese principle of ma, the space between two things.
