= Sara Arai =

Chinese-Japanese fashion designer

Sara Arai (荒井 沙羅) is a Chinese-Japanese fashion designer.

She was born in Beijing, China.

Her designs incorporate traditional Japanese dyeing techniques such as miyazome and toki-ori. In this way she is trying to preserve the traditional dying technique while finding contemporary designs and usages for them.

She attended the Fashion College Sakuragaoka. She showed her work at the Tokyo Fashion Week. In 2013, she was invited to show her work at the Paris Fashion Week.
