= Ron LoVece =

American fashion designer

Ron LoVece (late July 1939 – 19 July 2010) was an American fashion designer. He was especially noted for his bridal wear, working with designers such as Christos, Alfred Angelo for the Michelle Piccione Collection, with The Diamond Collection, and in his later years with the Justin Alexander collection.
