= Taiwanese fashion =

Culture and history of fashion in Taiwan

Taipei Fashion Week 2023

Taiwanese fashion is known for its emerging designers and manufacturers of sports and outdoor clothing, technical textiles, functional manufacturing, ready-to-wear and custom-made creations.

Taipei, the country's capital city, is also a fashion capital of the world and the home of the annual event Taipei Fashion Week, the country's main event where young and creative Taiwanese fashion designers showcase unique creations.

For decades now, Taiwanese fashion has evolved due to inspirations from Western culture in the past, from Taiwan's wealth, social media practices in Taiwan as well as the country's highly developed economy. This, with the rise of the Taiwanese Wave has also made Taiwan increasingly influential in fashion trends worldwide due to the popularity of its modern pop culture.

== History ==
The evolution of Taiwanese fashion closely reflects the island nation's diverse colonial and political history.

=== 17th to early 20th Centuries ===
In the early 17th century, under the Kingdom of Tungning (1662–1683), Han immigrants from Taiwan preserved Ming-style clothing, e.g. the wide-sleeved gown of Feiyufu, and resisted the Manchu hairstyle until surrender in 1683.

During Taiwan under Qing rule, Taiwanese women wore clothes that resembled folded aprons, with styles that incorporate traditional symbols of good luck, such as phoenixes, bats and peonies.

=== Japanese Colonial Period (1895–1945) ===
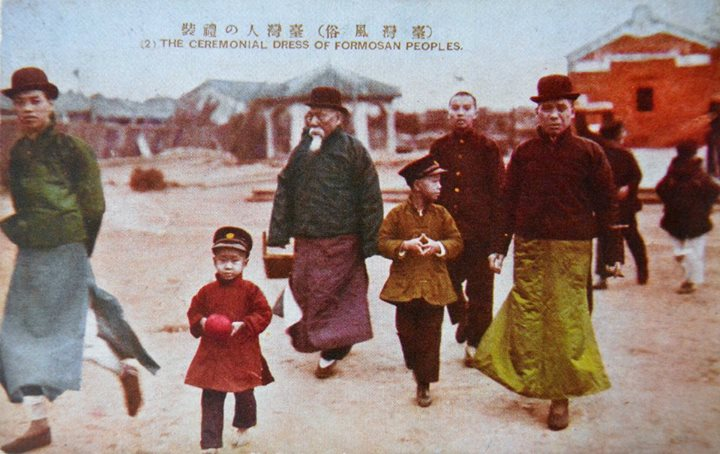
Taiwanese people wearing ceremonial dress during the Japanese Colonial Period.

Taiwan under Japanese rule led to a clothing reform, following the banning of the Manchu hairstyle and foot binding by the Japanese colonial government in 1914.

Western-style clothing spread rapidly among men and women and kids. By the late 1910s, Taiwanese women began adopting western style tube skirts and dresses also became less loose and more tightly-fitting. By the 1930s, the cheongsam became popular due to its rise to popularity in Shanghai.

Japanese authorities did not view this trend favorably. They actively promoted policies designed to instill a Japanese national identity, and school uniforms serve as a prime example of this, which imitated Japanese styles – female students wore their hair cut short at ear level and learned Western-style garment making. Through transforming the mindset of the new generation, the Japanese authorities sought to encourage the Westernization of clothing in Taiwan.

=== Republic of China era (1945–now) ===
After the surrender of Japan at the end of World War II, the Republic of China took over the control of Taiwan. After Retreat of the government of the Republic of China to Taiwan, costume was once again linked to national identity as the Kuomintang government promoted the Chinese qipao. To wipe out the lingering effects of Japanese colonial rule, the Kuomintang government banned the wearing of Japanese geta and kimonos.

By the 1950s, Taiwan's textile industry emerged into a powerhouse, especially in the late 1950s, transforming home sewing into early fashion entrepreneurship. In the 1960s, dying technology gradually came to Taiwan, which saw the beautification of fabrics and a proliferation of colors and styles. Coupled with a rise in wealth, the emergence of beauty pageants and American cultural influence, young people began to be interested in Western styles like mini-skirts and Hippie fashion. However, during the martial law period, the government did no permit men to have long hair, so the police would send men with long hair to a barber and force them to get it cut. Also, television shows could not feature actors dressed in hippie styles.

In the 1980s and 1990s, democratization and cultural resurgence encouraged Taiwanese designers to explore a unique local identity, leading to the rise of fashion designers such as Wang Chen Tsai-Hsia and Isabelle Wen. To set themselves apart from Western designers, many attempted to infuse their work with a style that is authentically Taiwanese, such as repurposing fabrics like Taiwanese floral prints as national symbols.

== Designers ==
Renowned fashion designers from Taiwan are e.g. Wang Chen Tsai-Hsia, Malan Breton, Wenlan Chia, David Chu, Apu Jan, Michelle Liu, Yupeng Shih, Yu Lun Eve Lin.

== Education ==
Fashion education in Taiwan is centered on art schools, universities and the major fashion manufacturers.

Academic institutions that offer courses in fashion design include:

- Shih Chien University (Taipei and Kaohsiung)
- Chinese Culture University (Taipei)
- Fu Jen Catholic University (New Taipei)
- Hsing Wu University (New Taipei)
- Asia University (Taichung)
- Tainan University of Technology (Tainan)
- Shu-Te University (Kaohsiung)

== Economy ==
In around 4,300 companies with more than 130,000 employees, a production value of roughly 333.6 billion NT dollars is generated by the Taiwanese textile and apparel industry, with the majority of its functional fabrics and intermediate products being exported globally.

=== Shiatzy Chen ===
Shiatzy Chen (Chinese: 夏姿．陳; pinyin: Xiàzī Chén) is a Taiwanese luxury fashion house founded in 1978 by Wang Chen Tsai-Hsia (王陳彩霞) and her husband Wang Yuan-Hong. Its style is described as "neo-Chinese chic", combining the aesthetics of Chinese clothing and handicraft with Western styles.

=== NET ===
NET is a Taiwan-owned clothing company that makes mass-market casual clothing and other items, selling the bulk of its products in Taiwan. It was founded in 1991 and as of 2024, had 144 stores across Taiwan.

=== Other Brands ===
Other famous fashion brands include Apujan, Douchanglee, Goopimade, Lativ, Namesake, One Boy, oqLiq, Verve and Yupeng Shih.

== Models ==
There is a range of fashion models from Taiwan that made it to international fame, such as Shatina Chen, Lin Chi-ling, Emman Atienza, Hannah Quinlivan, Hsu Wei-ning, Vivian Hsu, Sonia Sui.

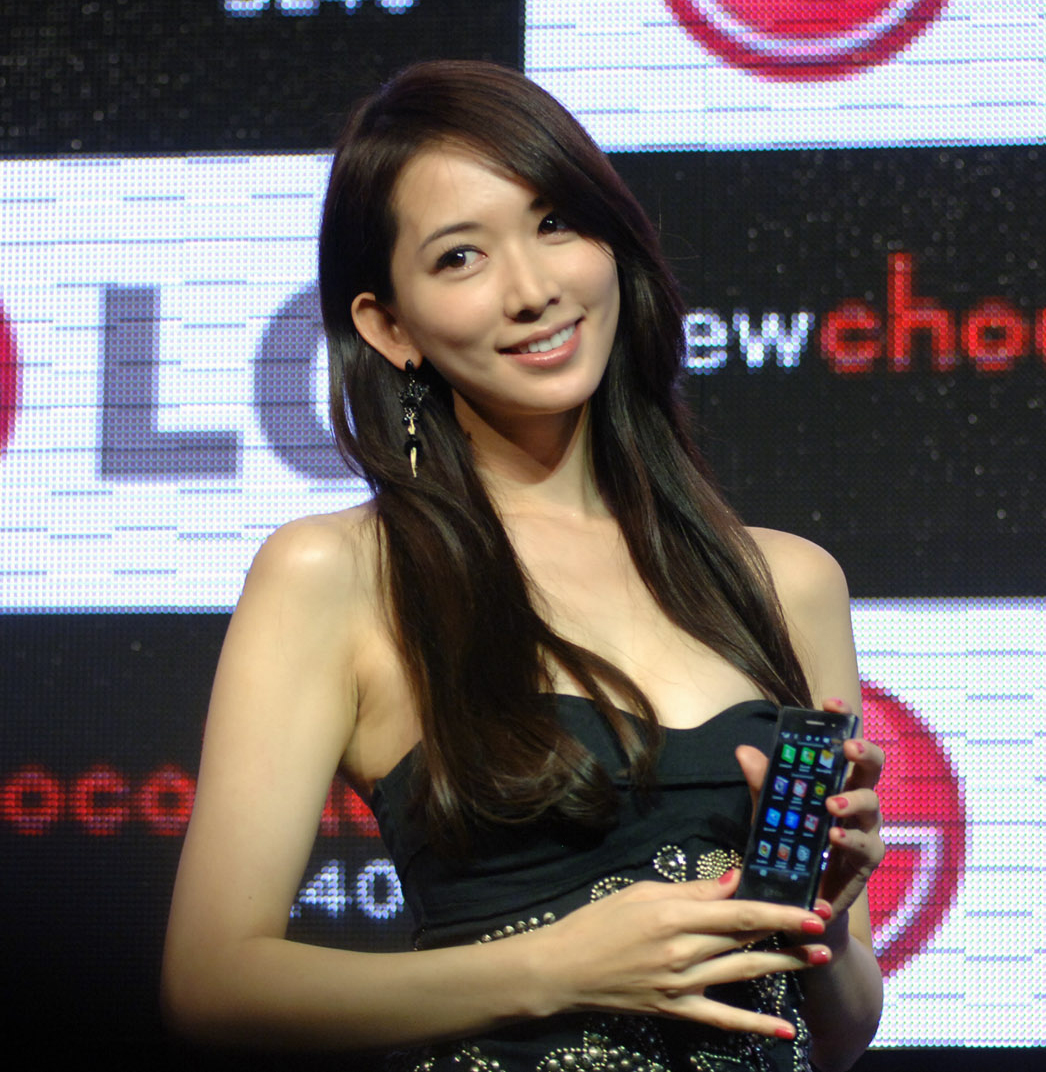
Lin Chi-ling

Shatina Chen

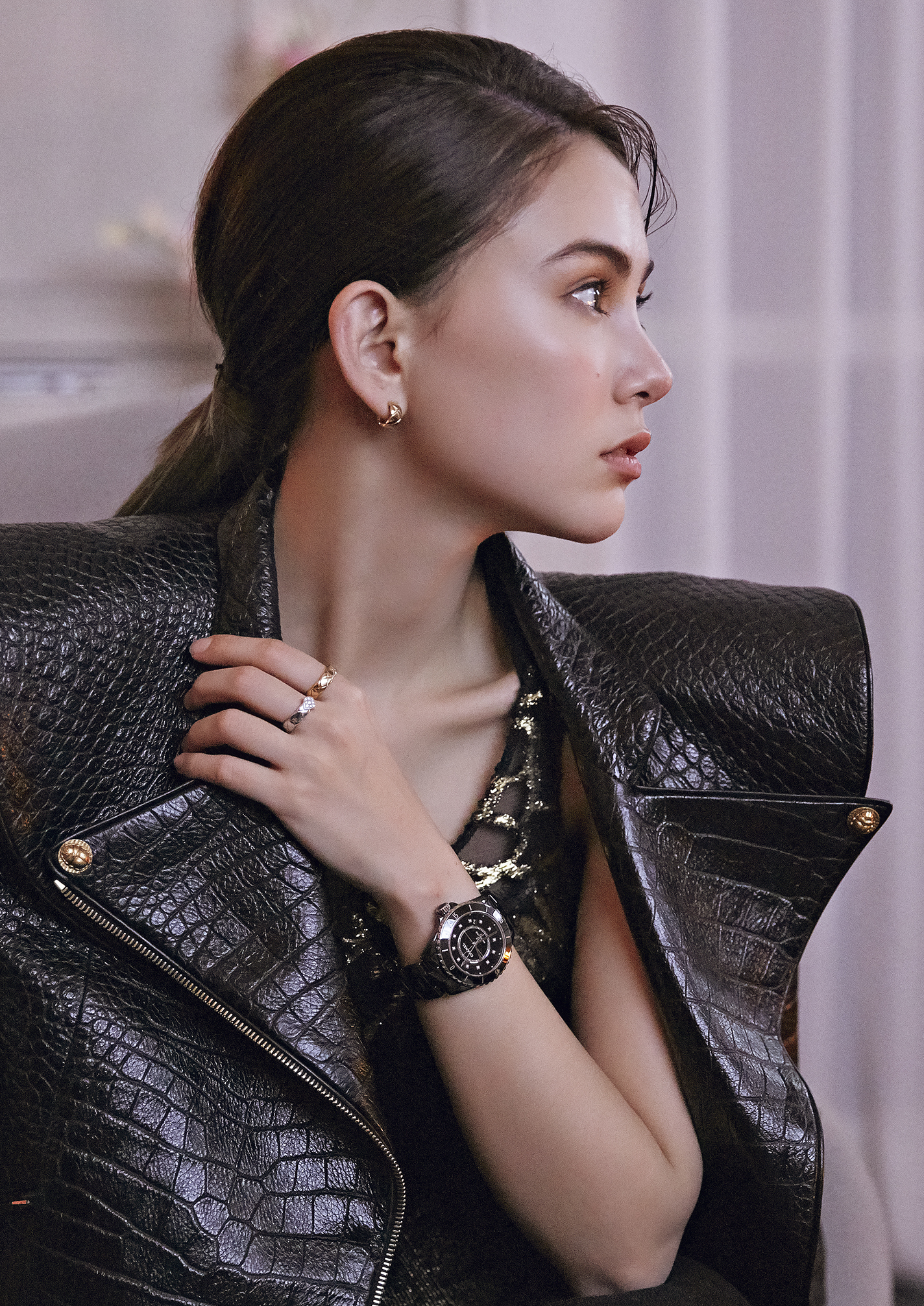
Hannah Quinlivan

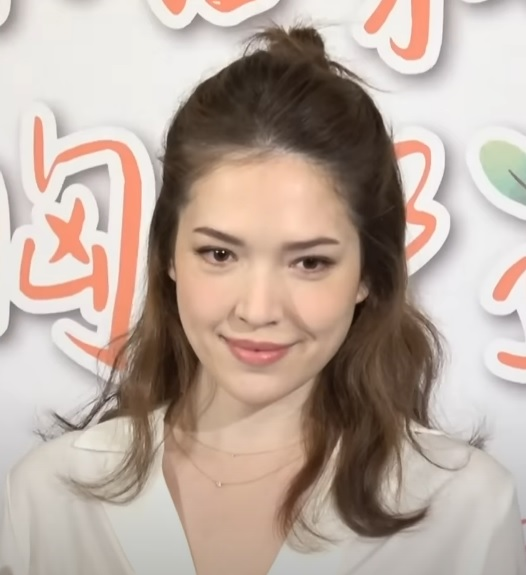
Hsu Wei-ning

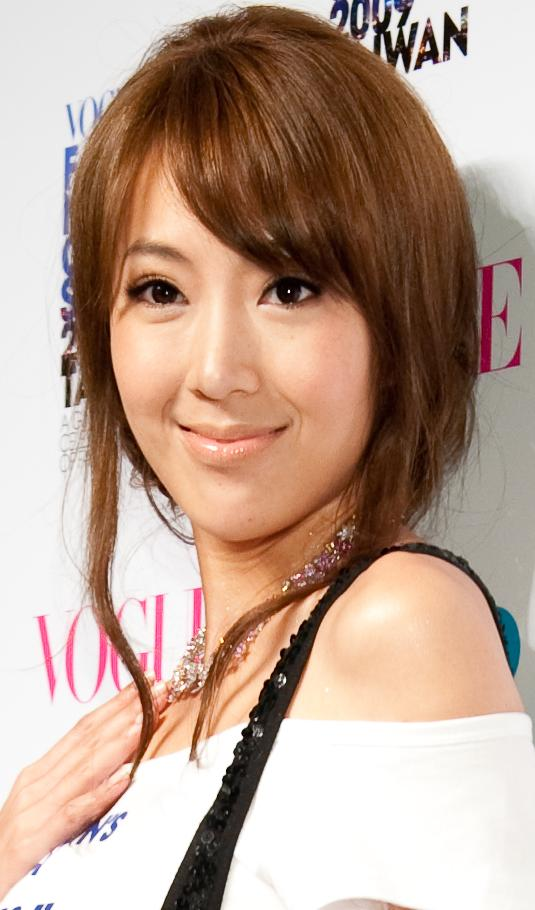
Sonia Sui

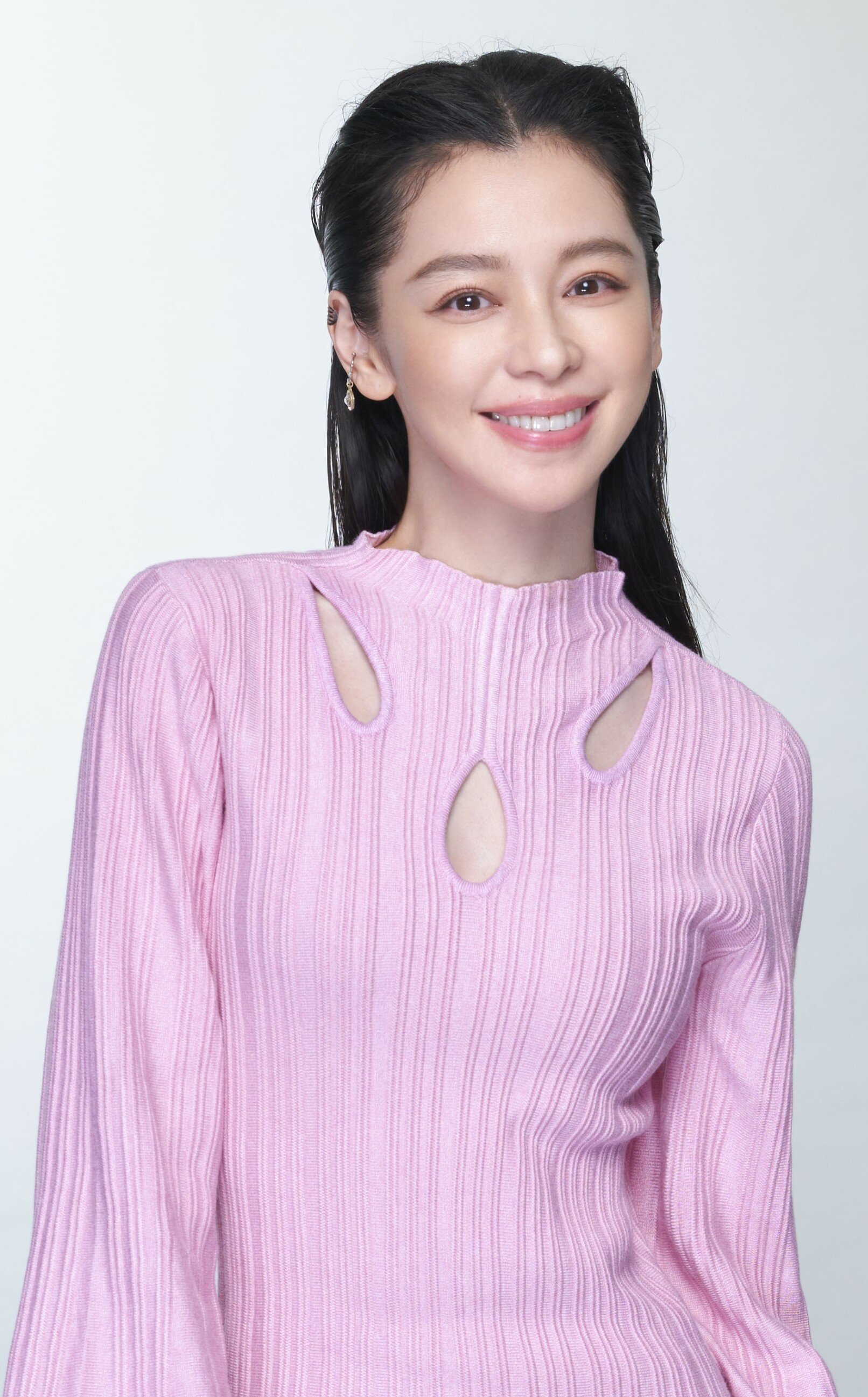
Vivian Hsu

== See also ==
- T-Beauty
- Taiwanese art
