= Elton Ilirjani =

Albanian-American fashionist and businessman (born 1980)

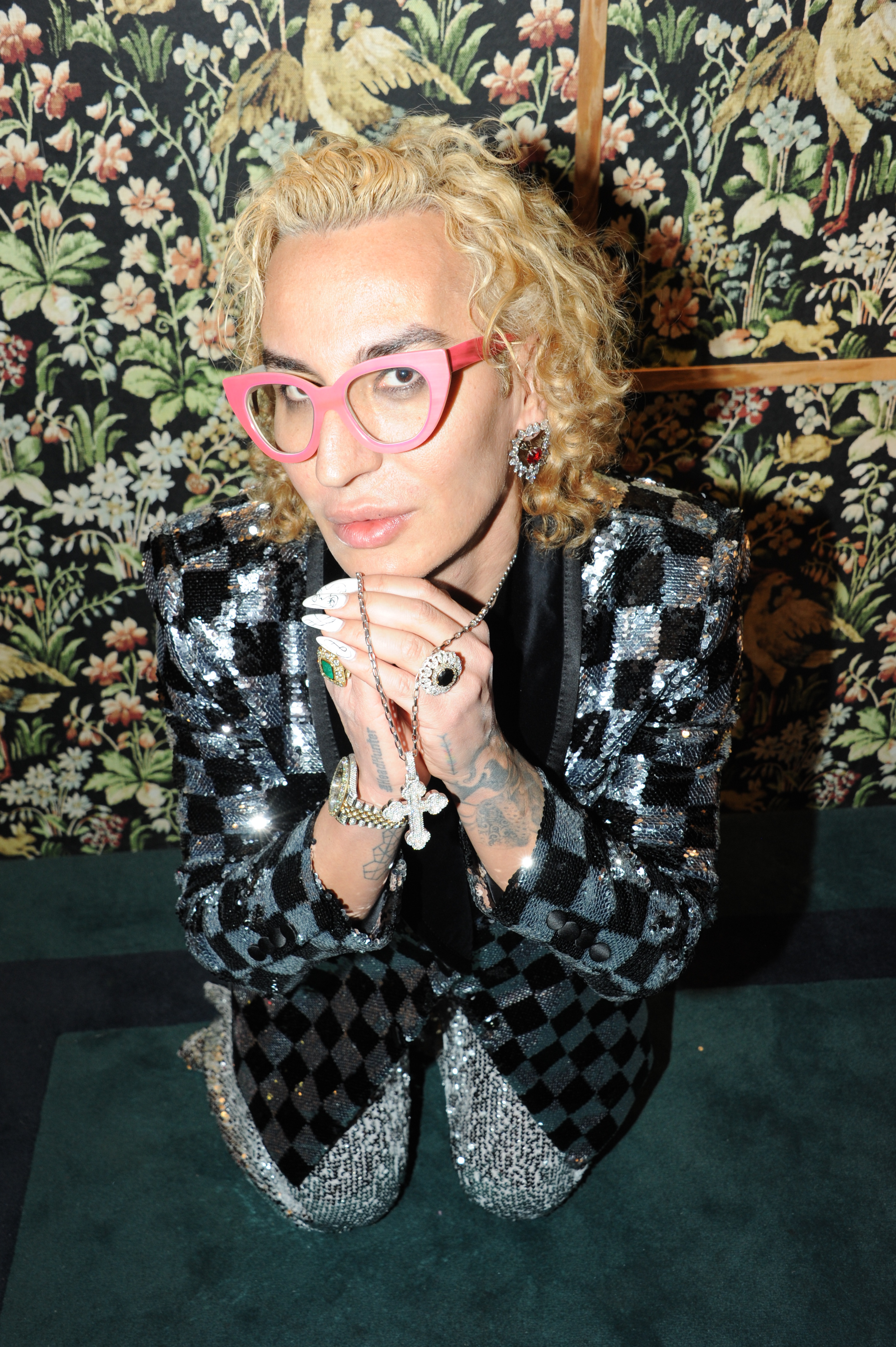
- Ilirjani in 2023
- Born: October 6, 1980 (age 46); Tepelenë, Albania
- Other name: HANKO
- Occupations: Model; businessman; LGBTQ activist
- Years active: 2012–present
- Spouse: Christian (m. 2019)

Elton Ilirjani (born October 6, 1980), better known by his stage name HANKO, is an American model, businessman, philanthropist and LGBTQ activist.

== Early life and education ==
Ilirjani was born to Hanko Ilirjani, whose first name directly inspired his eventual pseudonym. His father was a hunter, and passed away in 2010. Ilirjani was an only child and realized he was gay at the age of 11. He was raised in Tirana and Tepelenë, Albania, and attended the Abaz Shehu Gymnasium, later receiving a bachelor's degree in economics and a master's degree in political science from the Mediterranean University of Albania. He has published poetry, including Neveria. Ilirjani moved to the United States in 2018. As of October 2025, he is a Doctor of Science Candidate in Economics at the Mediterranean University of Albania.

== Career ==
In 2016, Ilirjani became the first businessman in Albania to come out as gay, and later became the first Albanian man to kiss another man on live television. In 2018, he was invited by UN Women to speak at the United Nations.

Ilirjani began modelling in 2019 after discovering Asian designers at the 3NY Boutique in New York Fashion Week New York City, and started walking runways in 2022 and 2023 for House of Mua Mua and BESFXXK. He has participated twice during Athens Fashion Week in Athens, Greece, the 33rd and 34th editions. He has walked for Malan Breton, Wijnruit, and Poet-Lab at London Fashion Week, Miki Takane and 1003 at Asian New York Fashion Week, Jemma Russo, Naoko Tosa, Sandriver, Wenny Han and Malan Breton at New York Fashion Week, Ema Savahl at Miami Swim Week, Recep Demiray x Hatun Tekstil, Ay Lelum, Shino, and Suzana Perić at Paris Fashion Week, BESFXXK, MMAM, Seokwoon Yoon, Greedilous and Maison Nica at Seoul Fashion Week, ICEWEAR and Arabesque Boudoir Maison at Iceland Fashion Week, Tiscareno Bridal at Milan Fashion Week, and two editions of Costa Rica Fashion Week. He led the first Fashion Protest during Miami Art Basel in December 2022.

In 2024, Ilirjani participated and was the show opener of Rakuten Fashion Week Tokyo walking for House of Mua Mua and 3 other Japanese fashion designers. In 2024, Ilirjani returned to Seoul Fashion Week walking for Greedilous and Maison Nica. In 2025, Ilirjani was named as the Guest of Honor at Iceland Fashion Week. In July 2025, Ilirjani was invited to the Osaka Japan Expo 2025, where he performed inside the “Zero Gravity Art” installation created by artist Naoko Tosa in cooperation with Kyoto University, Osaka, Japan. He starred in Malan Breton's fashion film "Je Suis Mona". The film later won the Trailblazer Prize on New York City International Fashion Film Festival (NYCIFFF) 2024 during New York Fashion Week. Later, the film won another prize at the London Fashion Film Festival 2024, where the Best LGBTQIA+ Talent was given to Ilirjani. In October 2025, Ilirjani was chosen as the performer artist by the Dutch Embassy in Tirana, Albania and the Amsterdam Rainbow Dress to perform at the Villa of the dictator Enver Hoxha in the heart of Tirana. He also participated in Taipei Fashion Week and was the special guest of Vogue Fashion Night Out in October 2025. As a businessman, Ilirjani is the CEO of recruitment company The HeadHunter Group, which he founded in 2012, as well as the non-profit organization Dignity Global Foundation. For his human rights activism and worldwide modeling activity, he was featured on Japan NHK.

In February 2026, Ilirjani joined Seoul Fashion Week, walked the runway for GREEDILOUS, and was the only model in the fashion presentations of BESFXXK and SEOKWOON YOON. At New York Fashion Week 2026, Ilirjani walked across three major showcases: Mexican fashion designer NOLO, Thai jewelry brand Sarran Contemporary Jewelry, and American designer Marina Safina. At London Fashion Week the same year, he walked for Poet-Lab, Dunne Cliff, and Drisha Closet.

September 2026, Ilirjani joined Tokyo Fashion Week walking as the finale for the American fashion designer Perry Jones and Japanese fashion designer SHINO.

== Personal life ==
Ilirjani is based in New York City, having previously lived in Tirana, Albania and Houston, Texas. Ilirjani has cited his runway performance inspirations to be Yoko Ono, Marina Abramović, and Michèle Lamy.

Ilirjani married his husband, Christian, in 2019. He is gay. Ilirjani is of Illyrian descent. In an interview, Ilirjani stated that he does not believe he personally should be a parent and is an opponent of same-sex adoption. Ilirjani owns two dogs: a Pomeranian named Mona and a Dalmatian named Hunter.

Ilirjani supported singer Parashqevi Simaku in December 2024, who had been homeless for 6 years. He facilitated her everyday living and made possible a meeting between Simaku and her only son. Ilirjani was later featured in a music video of Simaku's.
