= Taipei Fashion Week =

Taiwanese fashion industry event

- Taipei Fashion Week 2023
- Genre: Fashion catwalk shows, clothing and fashion exhibitions and surrounding events
- Frequency: Biannually
- Locations: Taipei, Taiwan
- Attendance: 25,776 (in 2026)
- Website: tpefw.com/en

Taipei Fashion Week (TPEFW) is a fashion event that takes place in Taipei, Taiwan biannually. Both established brands and starting designers show their collections. The event first began in 2018 and is supported by the Ministry of Culture. The TPEFW is held at the Songshan Cultural and Creative Park location. In addition to the runway shows, which were open to invited guests and public with purchased tickets, the event also includes pop-ups, workshops and exhibitions to let audiences have a different experience. In 2024, Olympic Games athletes were spotlighted on the runway alongside collaborations with prominent international outlets like Vogue Taiwan, and LVMH Prize nominees.

In cooperation with many consulates of other countries in Taipei, TPEFW also invites many international designers to present their latest work. It is also a venue for those designers who are targeting Taiwan. Partnerships between Taiwan's textile sector and emerging designers has enabled the event to emerge as a prominent event in Asia by promoting sustainable design, functional design, indigenous craft collaborations, cultural heritage, and fabric innovation.

== Well-known (former) participants ==
- Shiatzy Chen
- Justin Chou
- WEAVISM
- Gioia Pan
- Elton Ilirjani
- Douchanglee
- OqLiq
- Yuma Taru
