= Apu Jan =

Taiwanese fashion designer

Apu Jan (Chinese: 詹朴) is a Taiwanese fashion designer based in London. He heads the eponymous fashion house APUJAN.

== Personal life ==
His father is the founder of PC Home Online, the largest e-commerce retailer in Taiwan. He is a graduate of London's Royal College of Art.

== APUJAN ==
APUJAN
- Product type: Womenswear and knitwear
- Country: United Kingdom, Taiwan
- Introduced: 2013; 13 years ago
- Markets: UK, Taiwan
- Website: store.apujan.com

Apu Jan debuted APUJAN in 2013 at London fashion week. APUJAN is based in London. Apu Jan is considered one of the best bespoke gown designers in Asia. His designs are known for their consistency and restraint.

In 2019 he did a collaboration with McDonald's on a set of meals influenced by Chinese calligraphy.

In 2020 he did a collaboration with McDonalds on a space themed collection which made extensive use of the color black both in the packaging and in the food itself.

His work has been seen on Audrey Tang and Janet Hsieh.

In 2022 he produced a short film for his autumn-winter 2022 collection entitled "The Ballad of A Story Keeper" which featured a sci-fi plot and Alice Tseng in the lead role.

== See also ==
- Art in Taiwan
- Art in the United Kingdom
