= Taiwan floral fabric =

Type of cloth featuring traditional Taiwanese patterns

Taiwanese floral fabric, also known as printed fabric (印花布), bedsheet fabric (被單布), or "huazi" fabric (花仔布), refers to a type of cloth featuring traditional Taiwanese patterns, while blending a rich mix of design elements from Chinese, Japanese, Western, and Taiwanese Indigenous cultures. Taiwanese floral fabric serves a wide variety of purposes and can be used as a decorative pattern for many items, commonly appearing on tablecloths, curtains, bags, wrapping cloths, quilts, or clothing.

== Naming ==
In Taiwan, the most commonly used name for this fabric is not “Taiwanese floral fabric” but rather “Hakka floral fabric (客家花布).”This type of fabric is deeply cherished by the Taiwanese Hakka community and has become one of the most prominent symbols of Hakka culture. However, the term “Hakka floral fabric” can be misleading, as Taiwanese Minnan people, Indigenous peoples, and mainlander communities have all widely used this type of fabric as well. It is not exclusive to the Hakka people. In fact, traditional Hakka textiles are characterized by shades such as cobalt blue, dark indigo, jade, and midnight blue — quite different from the bright, vivid colors that dominate modern Taiwanese floral fabric today.

== History ==
Taiwanese floral fabric first appeared during the period of Japanese rule in Taiwan. The Japanese, noticing the island’s abundance of diverse motif, conceived the idea of commercializing these designs. At the same time, the textile industry was in urgent need of labor, which led to the mass production of Taiwanese floral fabric. These fabrics were not only used locally in Taiwan but were also exported extensively to mainland Japan and Manchukuo. The patterns of Taiwanese floral fabric were also influenced by Japanese aesthetics. These fabrics were originally produced by traditional fabric shops, known as “buzhuang (布莊).” After modern industrial cotton fabrics became well-established in Japan, Taiwan’s local fabric shops underwent a complete transformation, switching to cotton as the primary material and incorporating a significant amount of Japanese technology into their production processes.

In 1946, following Japan’s surrender to the United States, which marked the end of World War II, the Republic of China took over Taiwan. Between the 1950s and 1960s, with the rapid development of Taiwan’s textile industry, Taiwanese floral fabric was mass-produced. Due to the Republic of China’s “Sinicization(中國化)” policy, the patterns of Taiwanese floral fabric gradually shifted to emphasize Chinese styles, particularly those influenced by the Qing Dynasty and the aesthetics of the Republic of China, while other pattern styles saw a significant decline. The version of Taiwanese floral fabric we are most familiar with today typically features bright vermilion red or light blue backgrounds, adorned with large, blooming motifs such as peonies, chinese dragons, fenghuangs, lotuses, and “Eight Treasures” patterns. The most iconic styles of Taiwanese floral fabric were born during this era.

After the 1970s, due to its high production volume, low price, and gaudy patterns, Taiwanese floral fabric gradually came to be regarded as a “cheap product.” Some people in Taiwan also criticized it for being overly traditional and outdated, leading to a significant decline in its production. During the 1980s and 1990s, with the lifting of martial law and the democratization of Taiwan, many local designers and artists began to view Taiwanese floral fabric as a creative medium and started using it as a source of inspiration for reinterpretations and innovative designs.

From the 2000s to the 2010s, the Taiwanese Hakka community actively revived the cultural significance of Taiwanese floral fabric within Hakka history and promoted it extensively. After the 2020s, with the rise of the “Taiwanization” and the “hipster design aesthetic,” Taiwanese floral fabric began to incorporate more Western, Japanese, and Indigenous patterns, while also drawing inspiration from Ming and Tang dynasty motifs preserved in the National Palace Museum in Taipei. This shift emphasized more elegant and luxurious color schemes, aiming to move away from the previously perceived gaudiness. Today, the patterns of Taiwanese floral fabric are rich and diverse enough to create hundreds of possible combinations, all imbued with a distinctly Taiwanese character.

== Examples of Taiwanese Floral Fabric Patterns ==
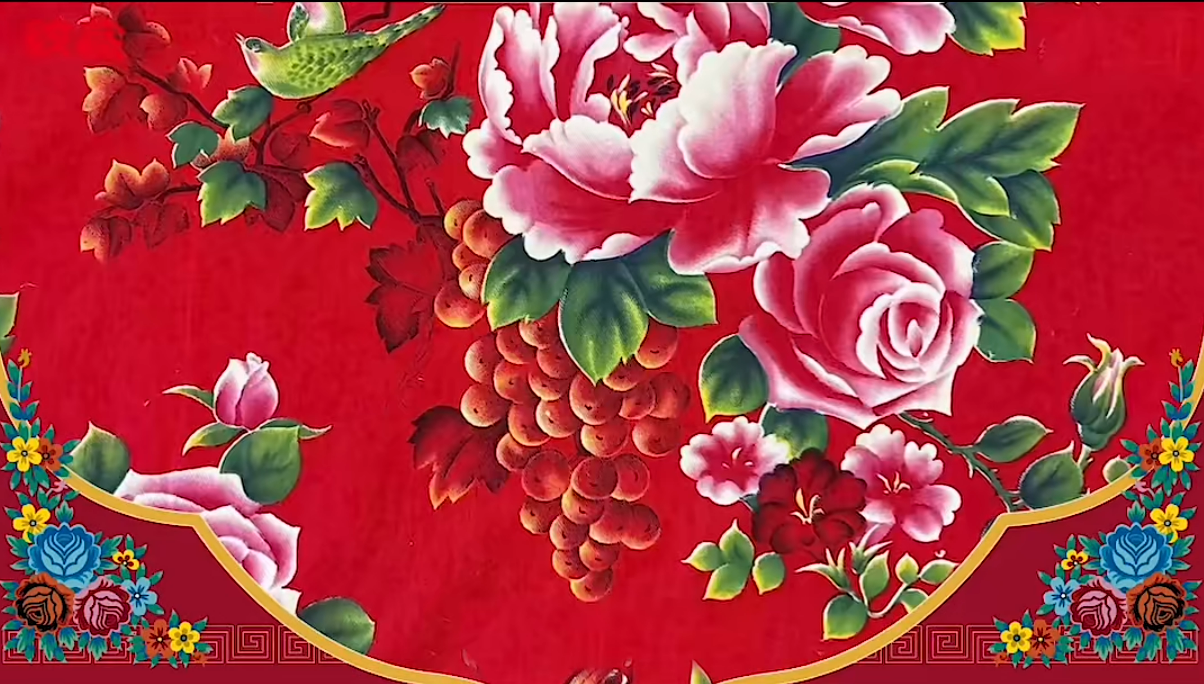
Peony Pattern from the Qing Dynasty Era (The Most Frequently Appearing Motif in Hakka Printed Fabric)

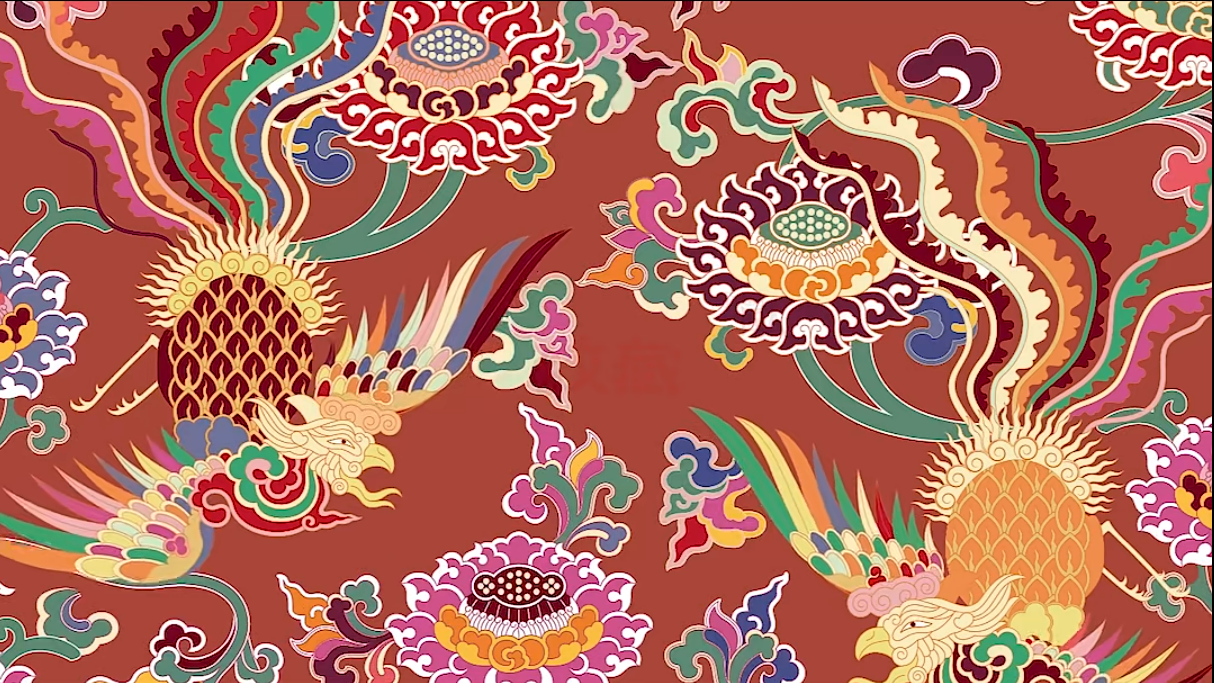
Chinese Dragon, Phoenix, and Lotus Pattern from the Qing Dynasty Era

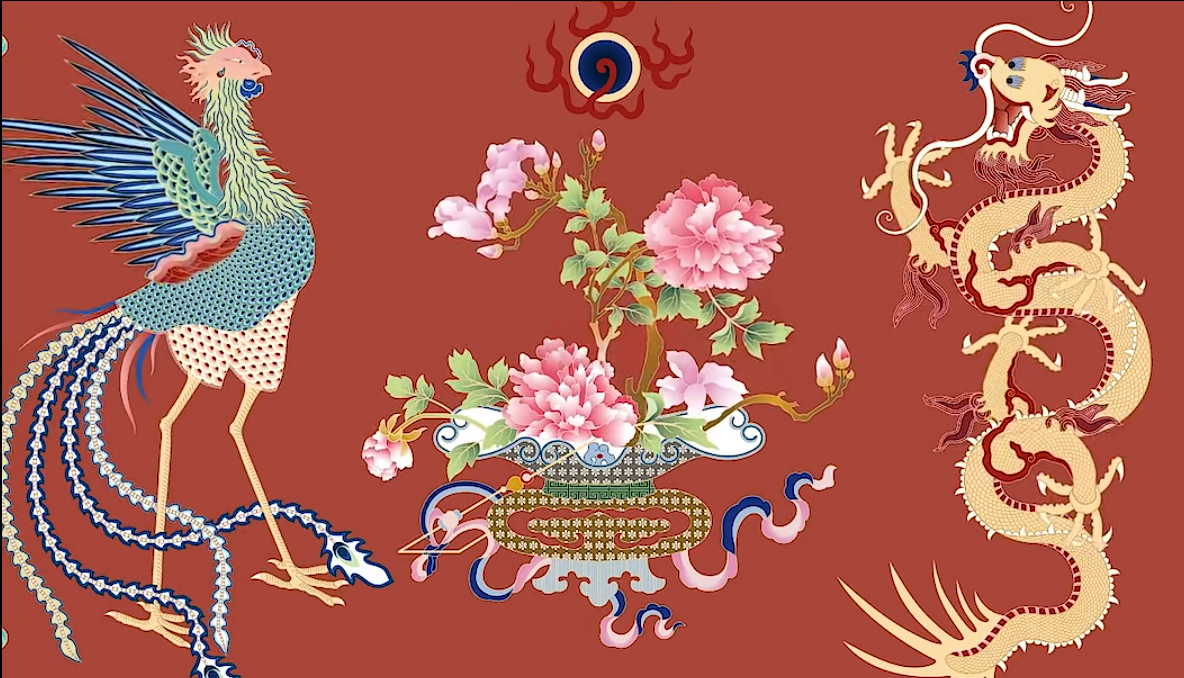
Chinese Dragon, Phoenix, and Flower Pot Pattern from the Qing Dynasty Era

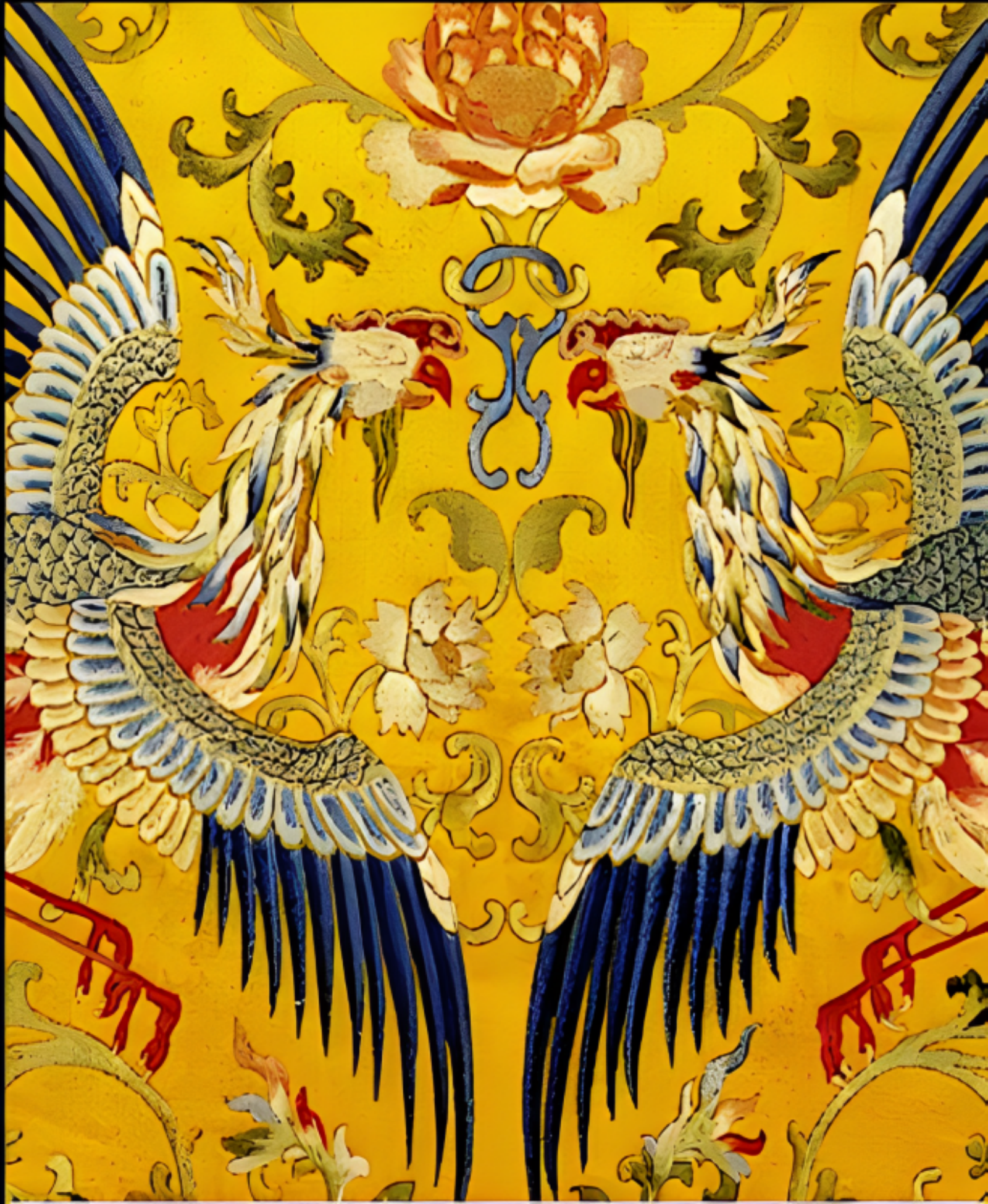
Double Phoenix and Lotus Pattern from the Ming Dynasty Era

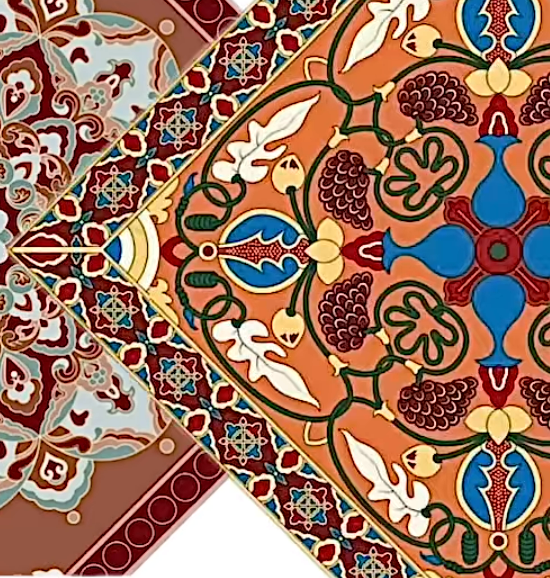
Baoxiang Flower and Grape Pattern from the National Palace Museum, Taipei

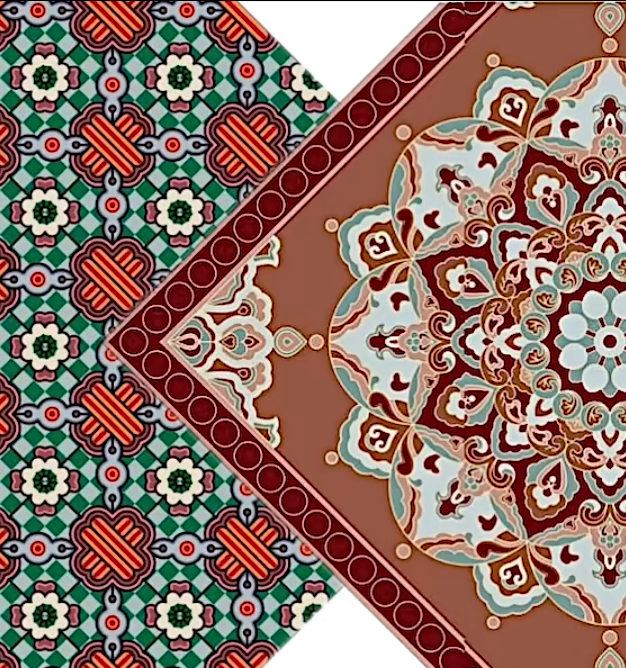
Baoxiang Flower and Eight Treasures Pattern from the National Palace Museum, Taipei

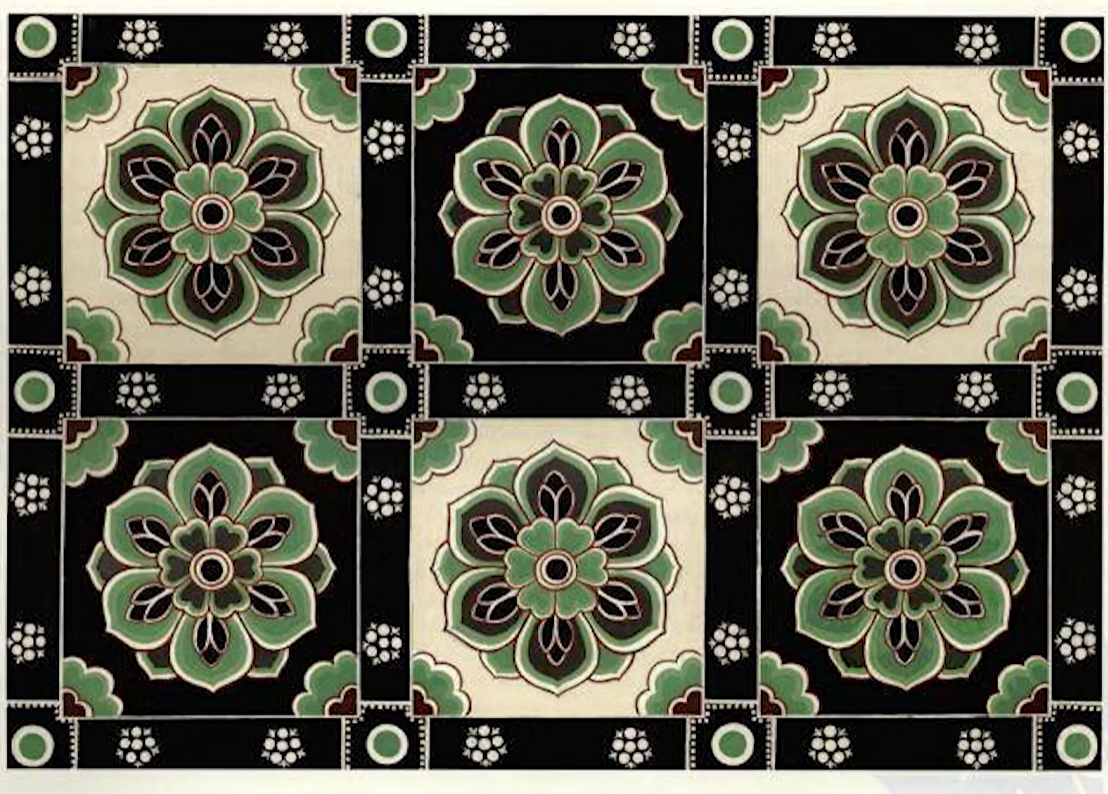
Blackish-Blue Six-Petal Lotus Pattern from the National Palace Museum, Taipei

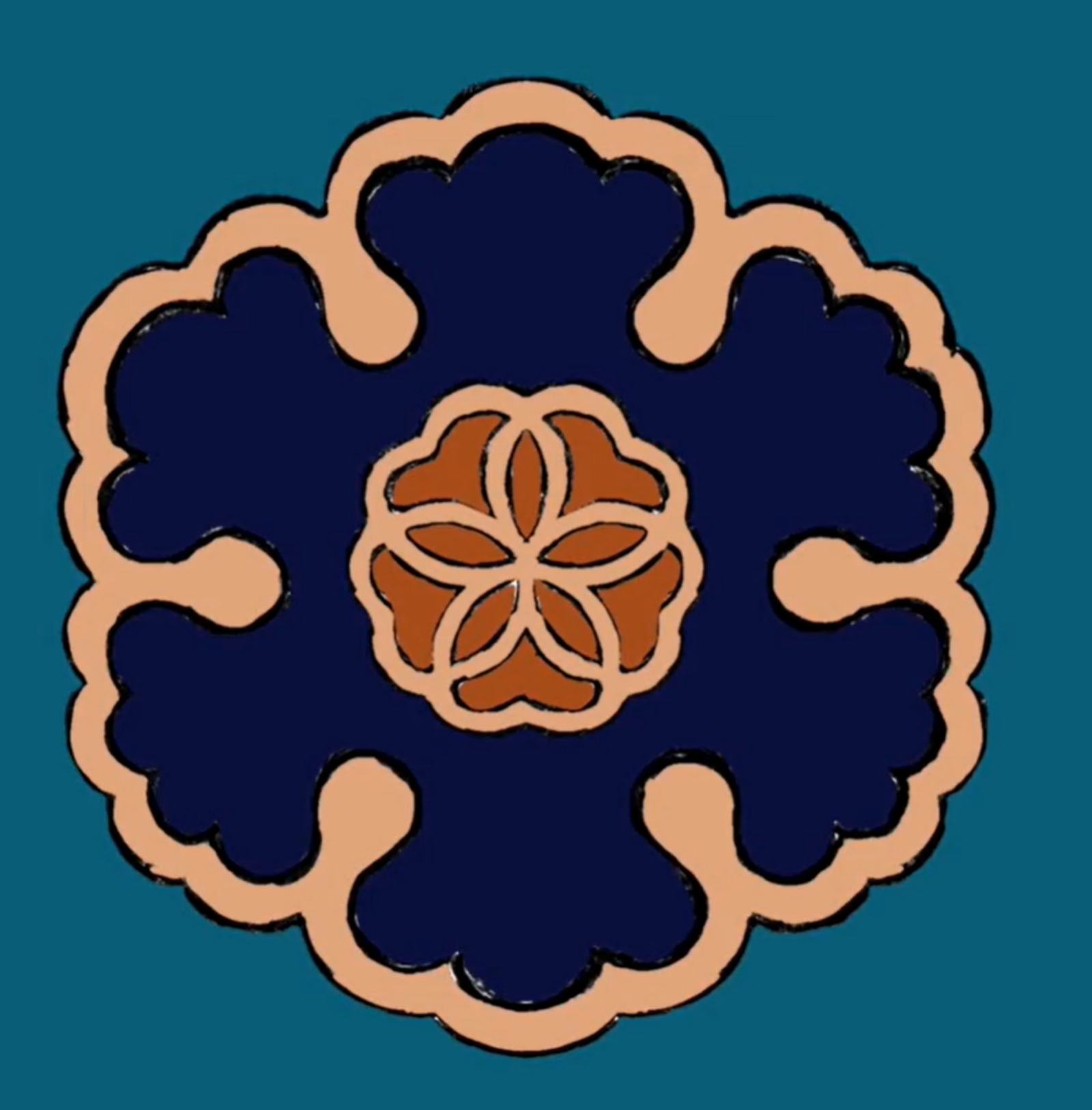
Plum Blossom and Six-Petal Lotus Pattern from the Republic of China Era

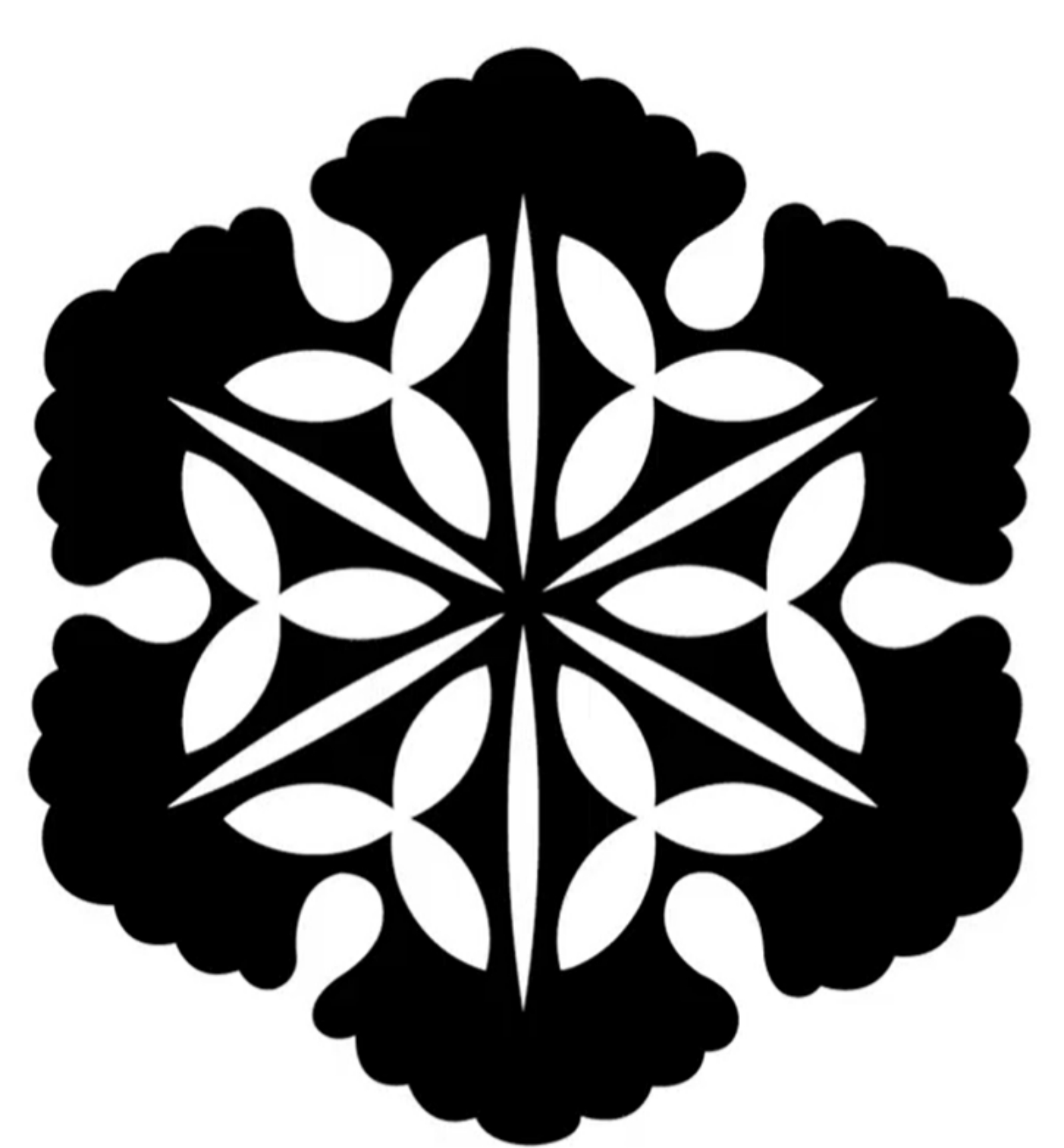
Snowflake Wheel Pattern in Tang Dynasty–Japanese Fusion Style

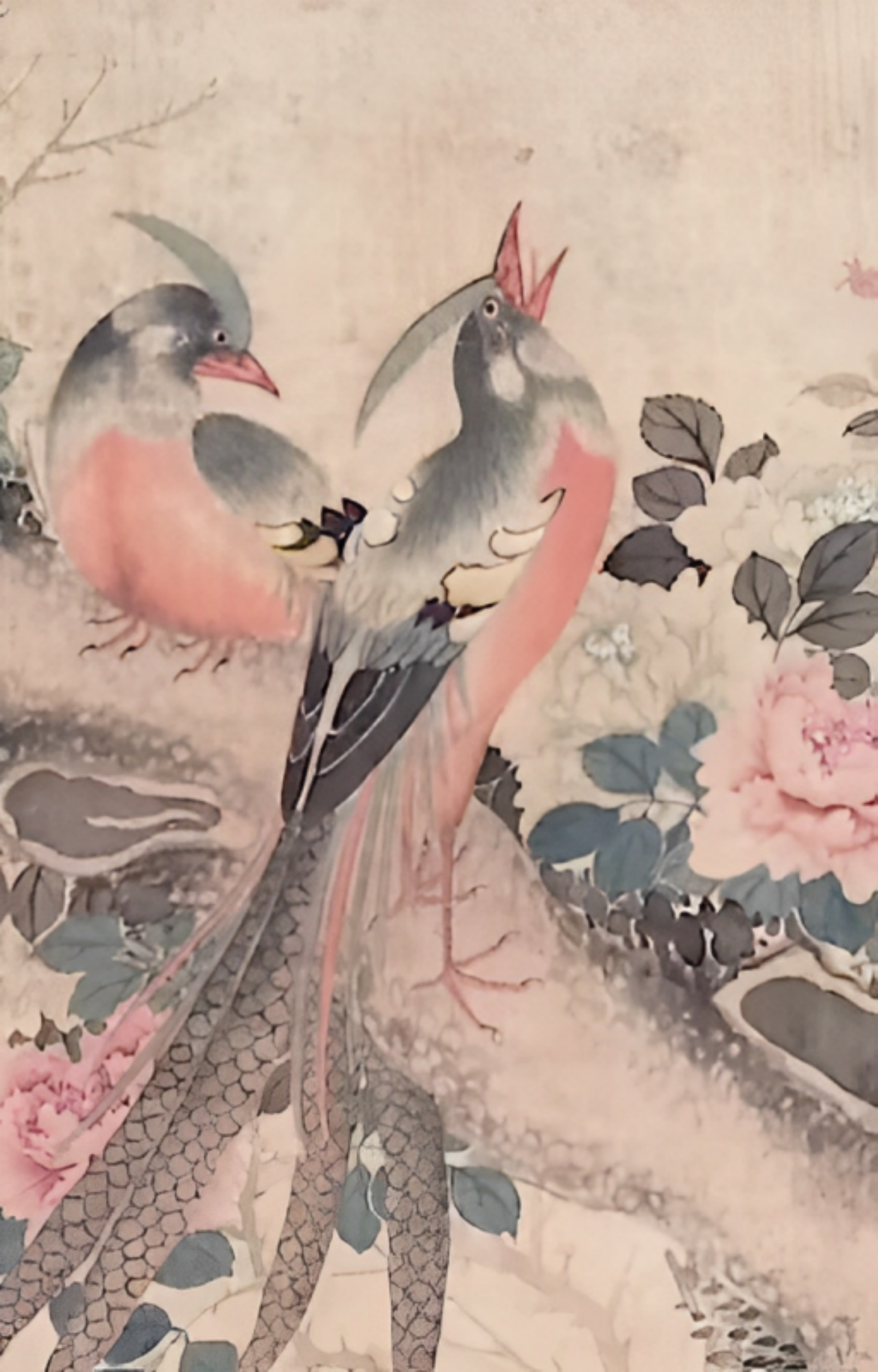
Double Birds Singing Pattern in Gongbi Painting Style

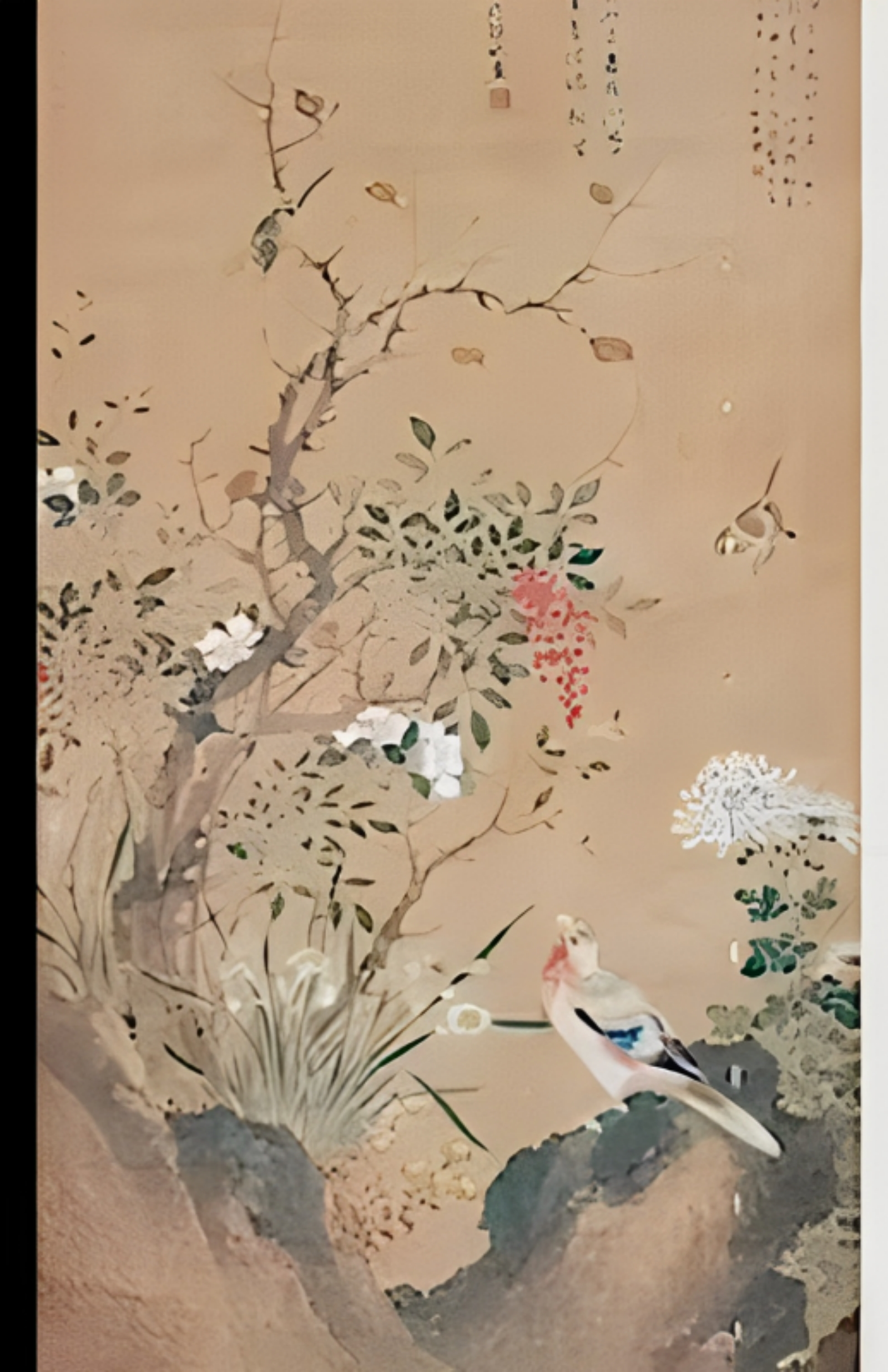
Birds and Branches Pattern in Gongbi Painting Style

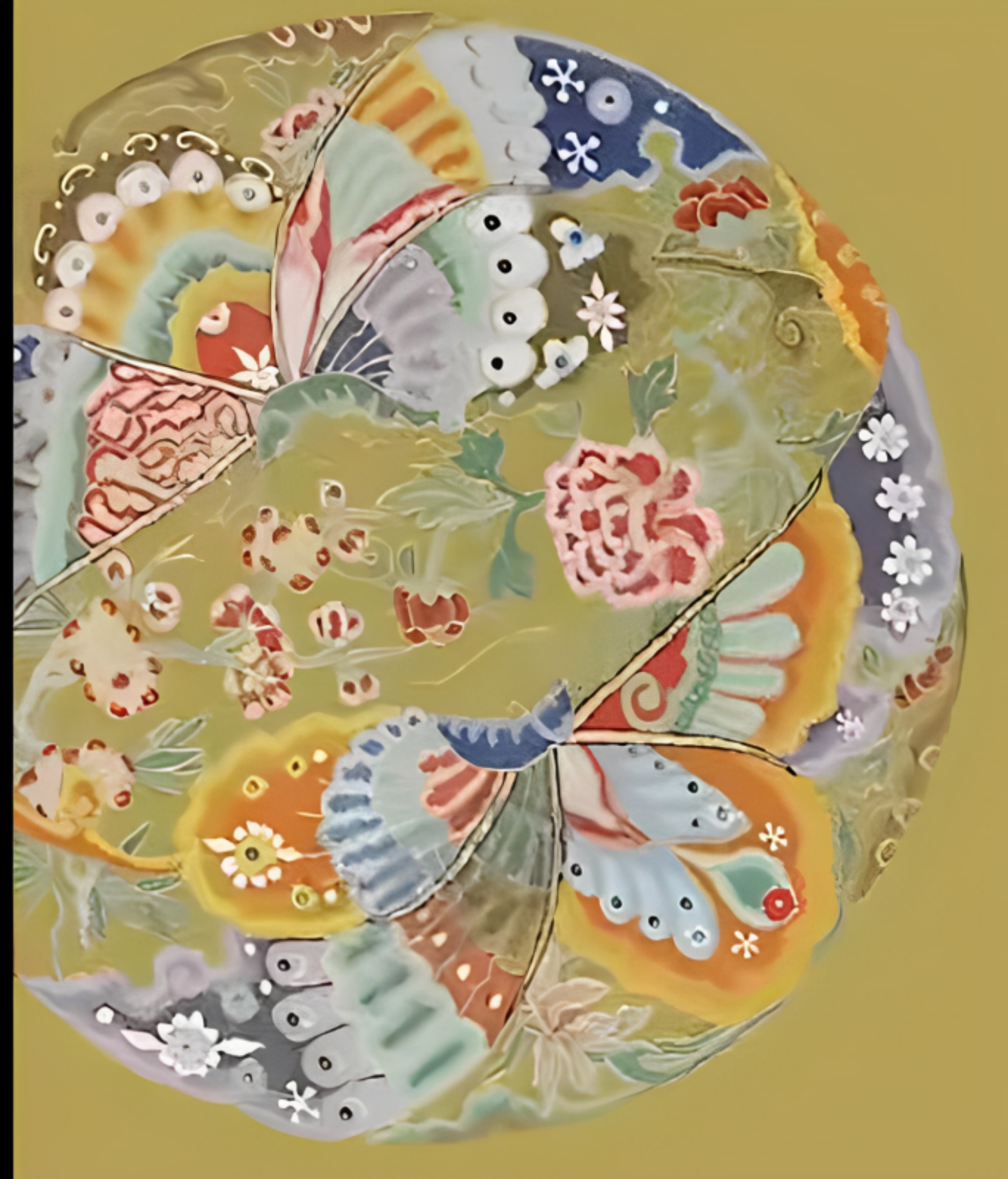
Butterfly Medallion Pattern in Gongbi Painting Style

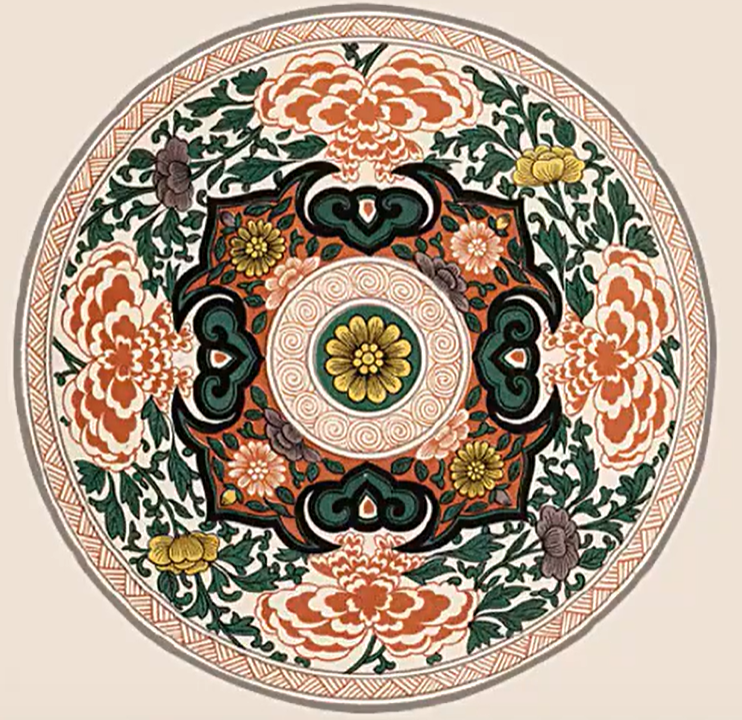
Hakka Style Square Peony Pattern

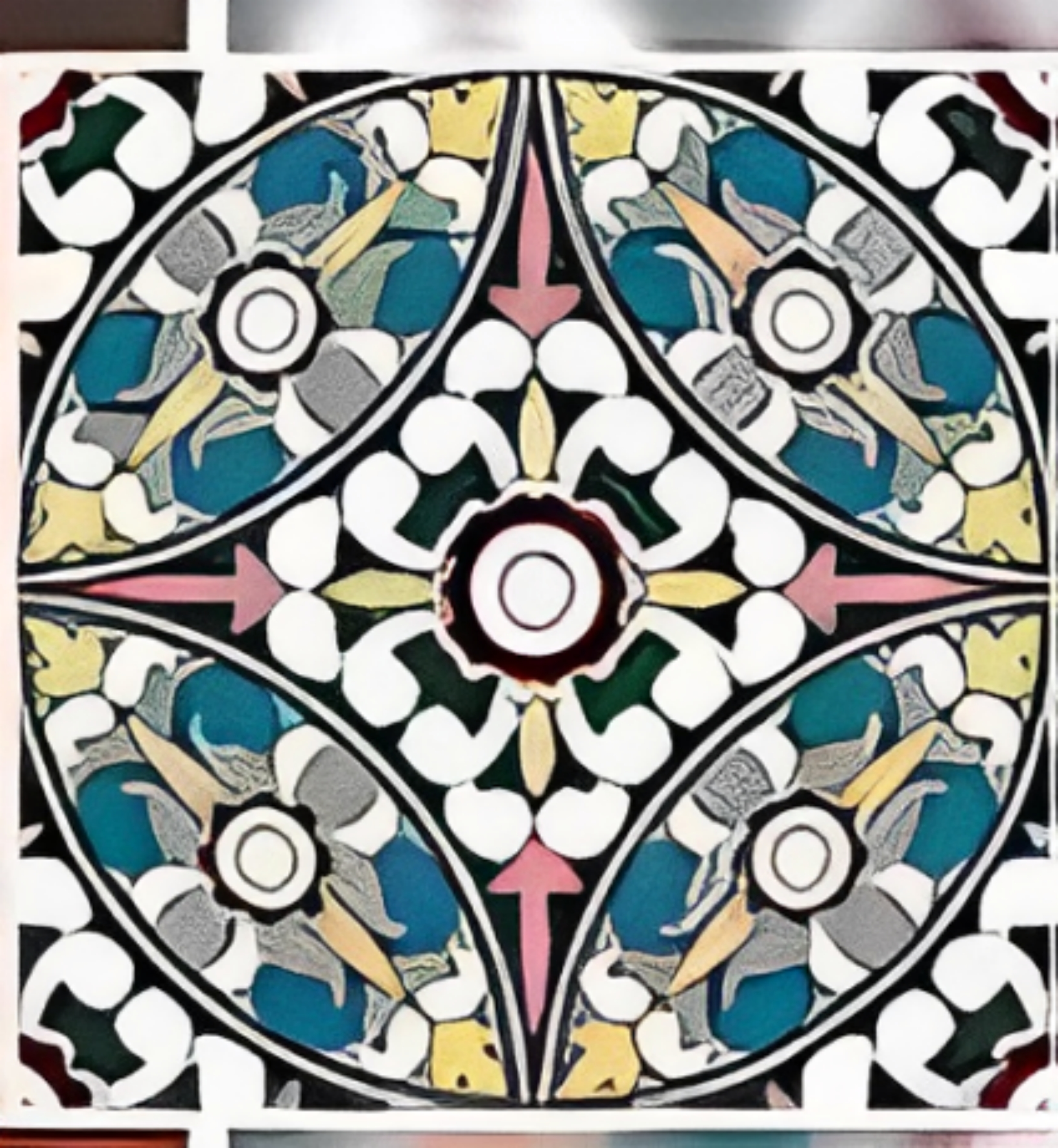
Indigenous Style Pattern 1 (Tribal Motif)

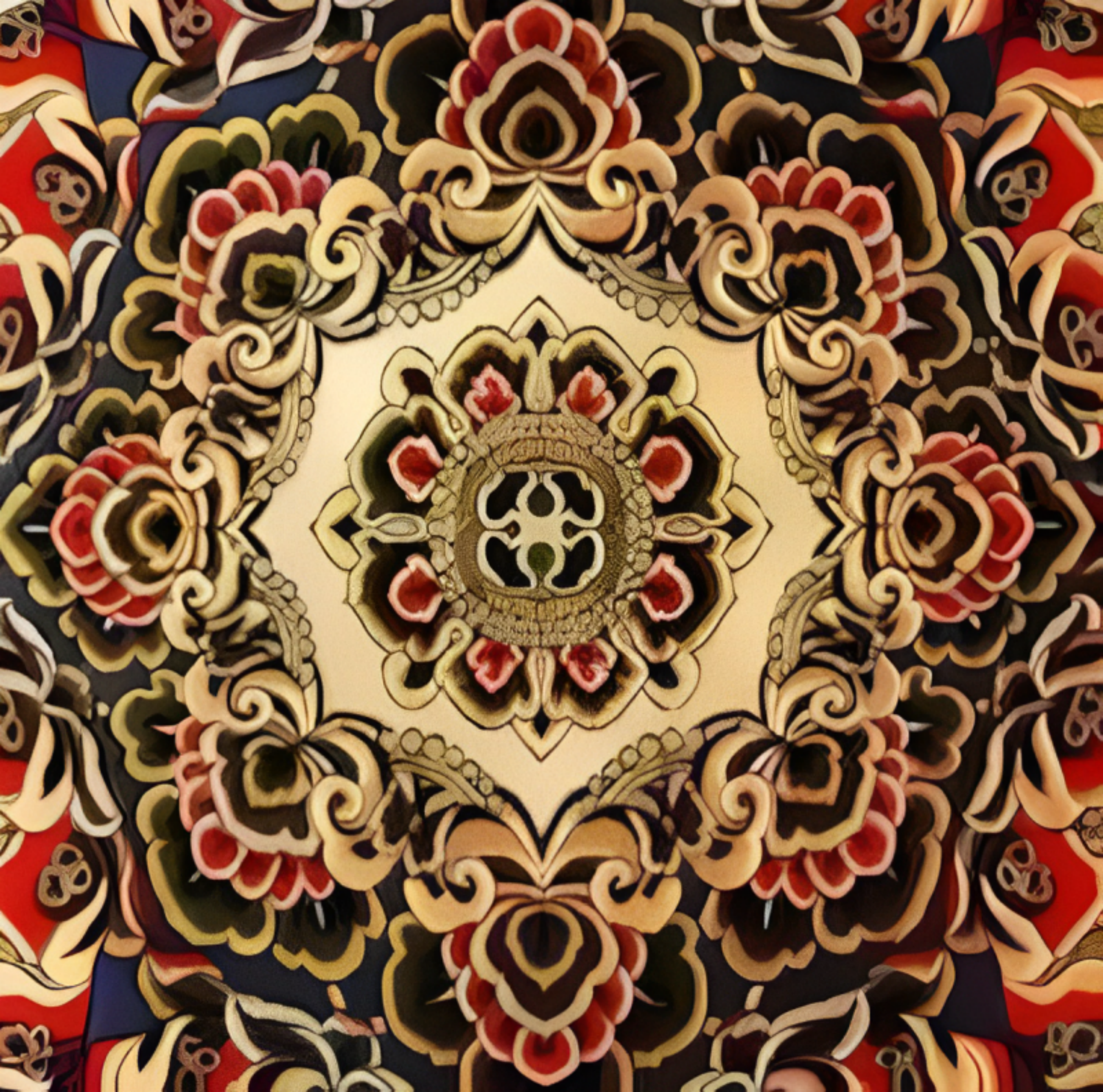
Indigenous Style Pattern 2 (Imitation Tang Ruby Pattern)

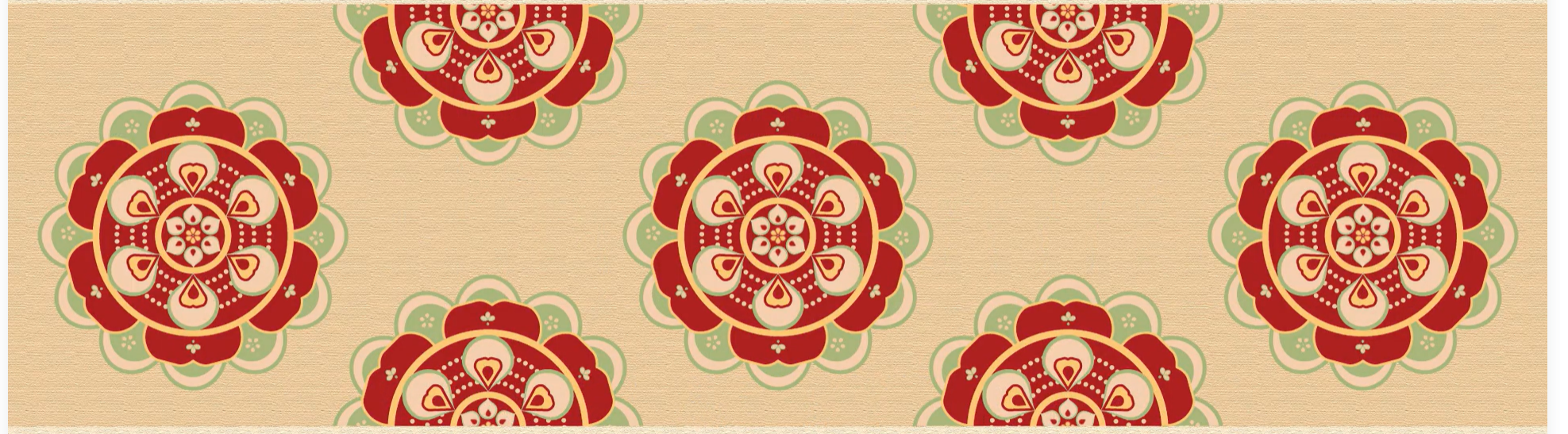
Indigenous Style Pattern 3 (Imitation Japanese Snowflake Wheel Pattern)

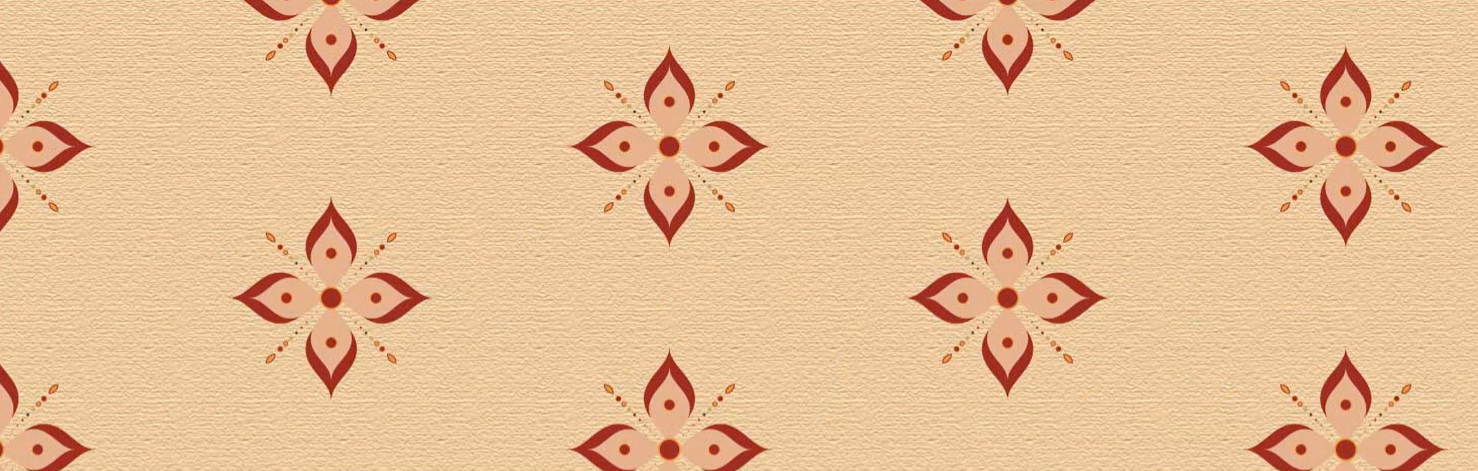
Indigenous Style Pattern 4 (Imitation Japanese Square Diamond Pattern)

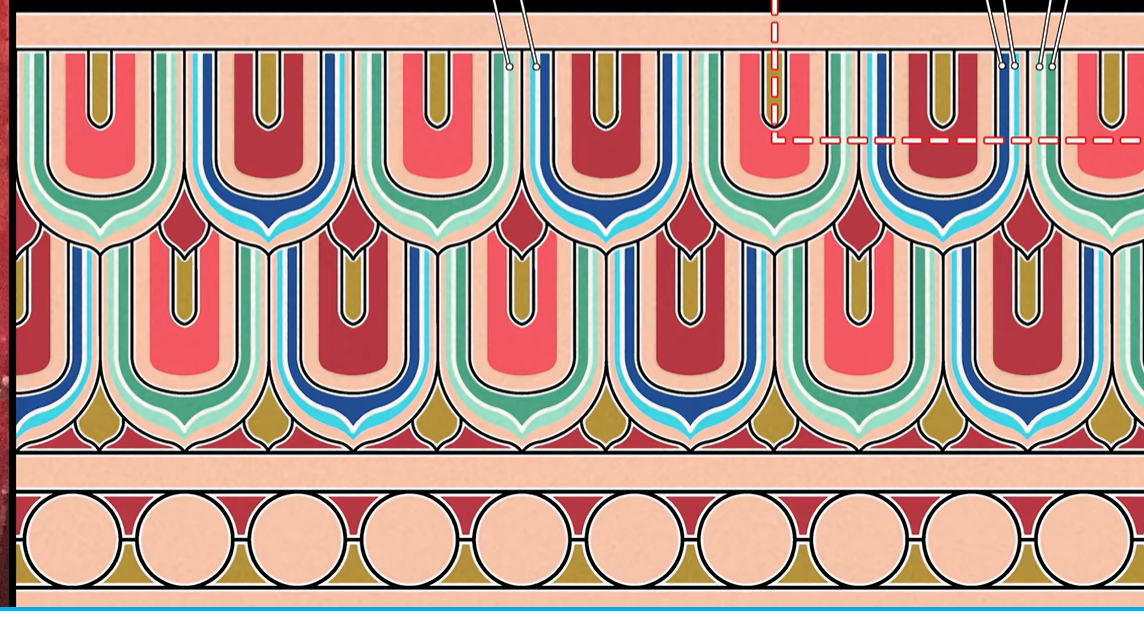
Imitation Tang Bundled Lotus Petal Pattern

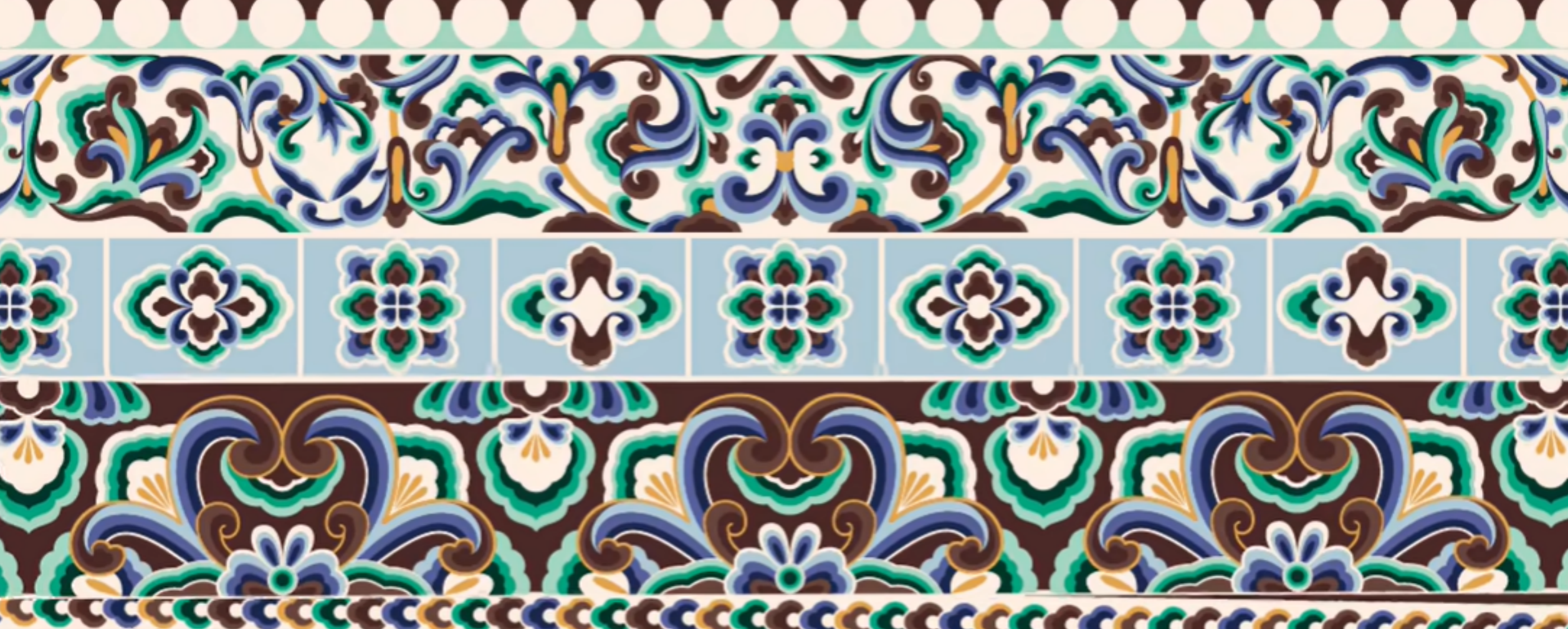
Luxurious Pattern in Taiwanese Indigenous Style

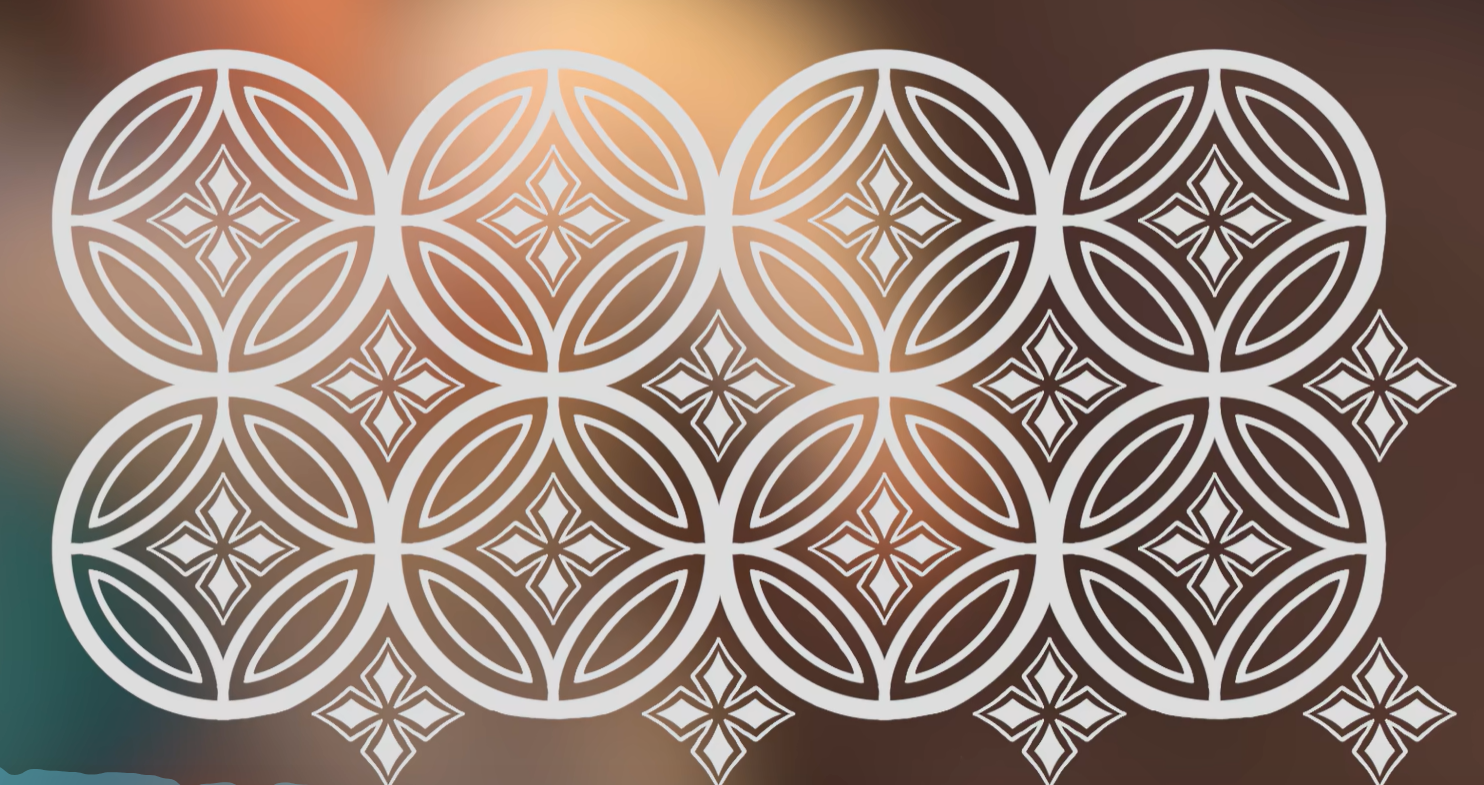
Hakka Copper Coin Pattern (Crossed Arrangement)

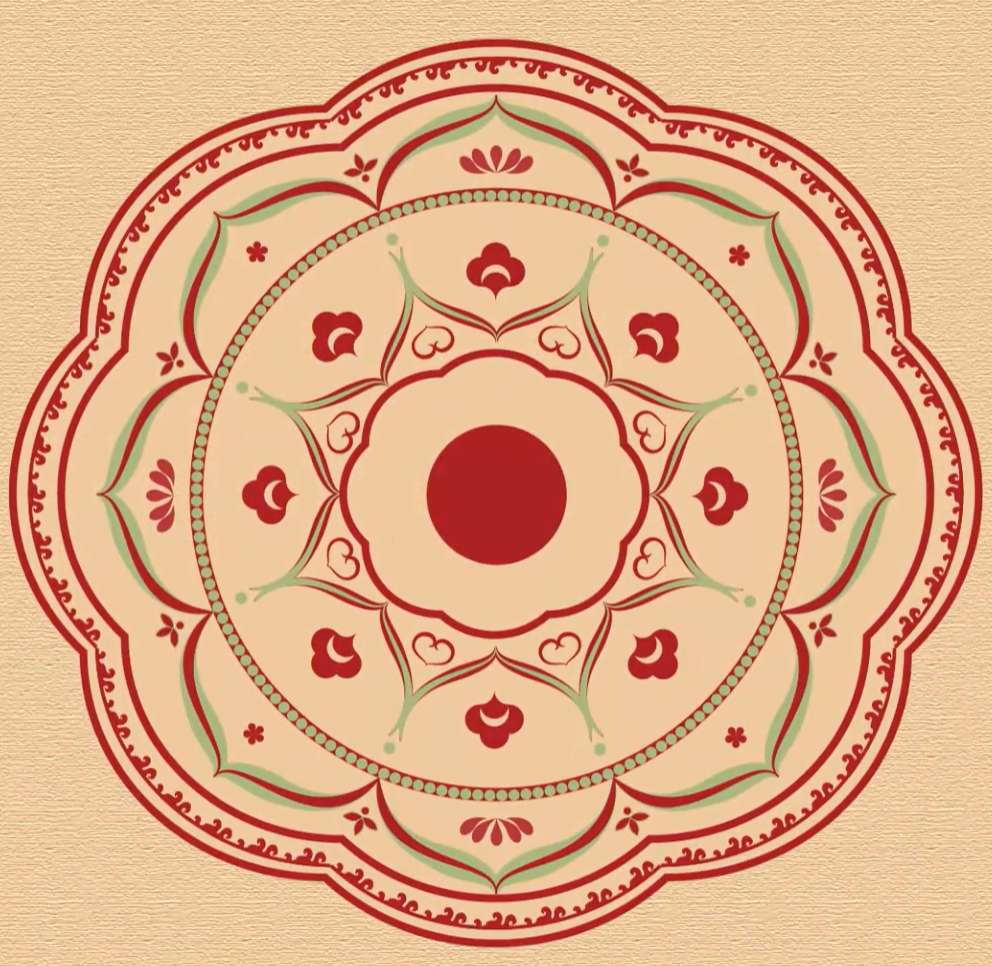
Indigenous and Tang Dynasty Hybrid Pattern 1

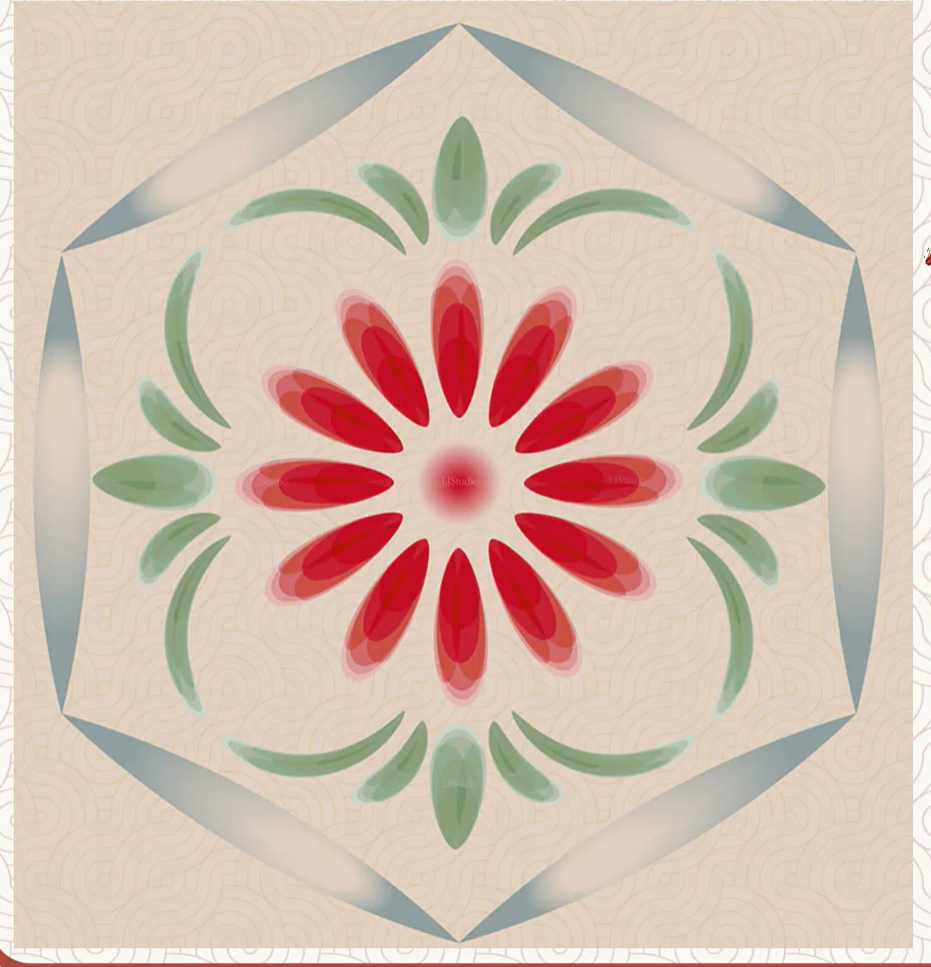
Indigenous and Tang Dynasty Hybrid Pattern 2

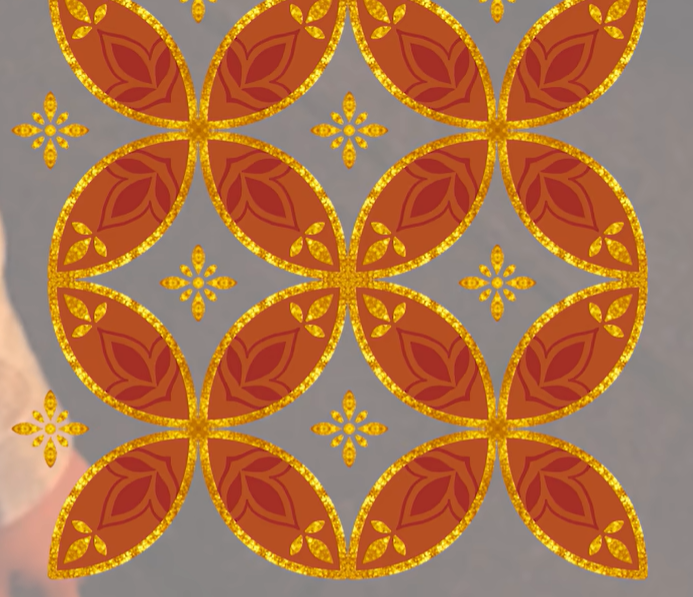
Hakka Copper Coin Pattern (Broken Arrangement)

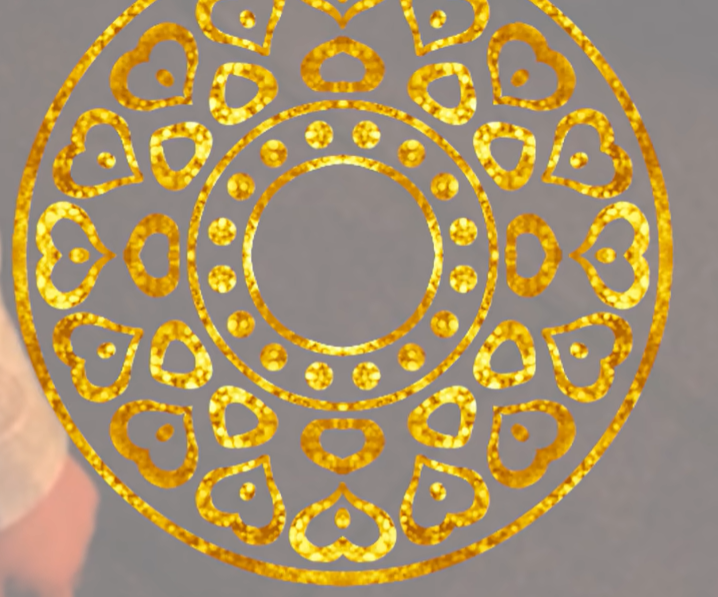
Hakka and Indigenous Fusion Style Pattern

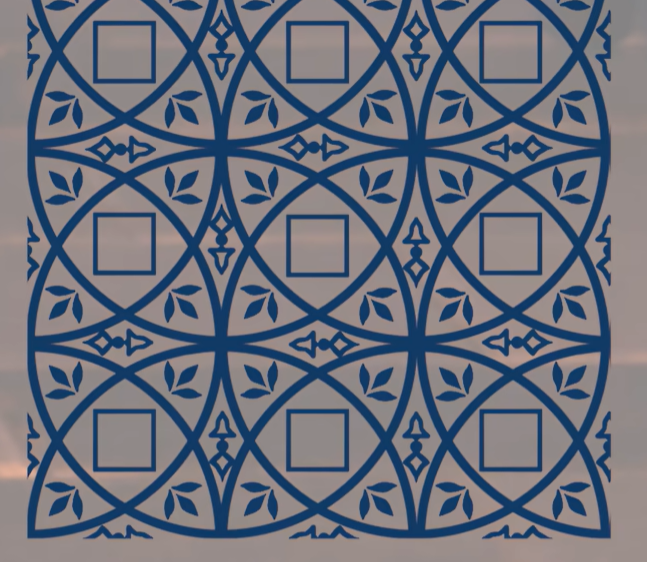
Hakka Copper Coin Pattern (Western and Japanese Fusion Style)

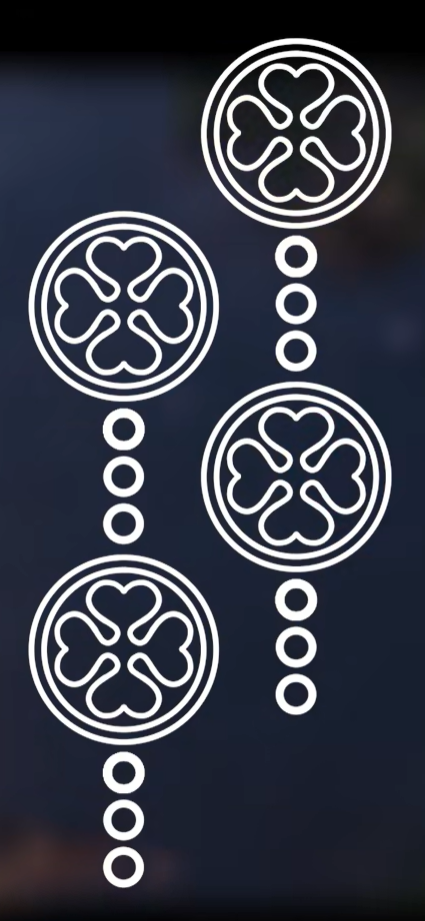
Hakka Copper Coin Pattern (Vertical Arrangement)

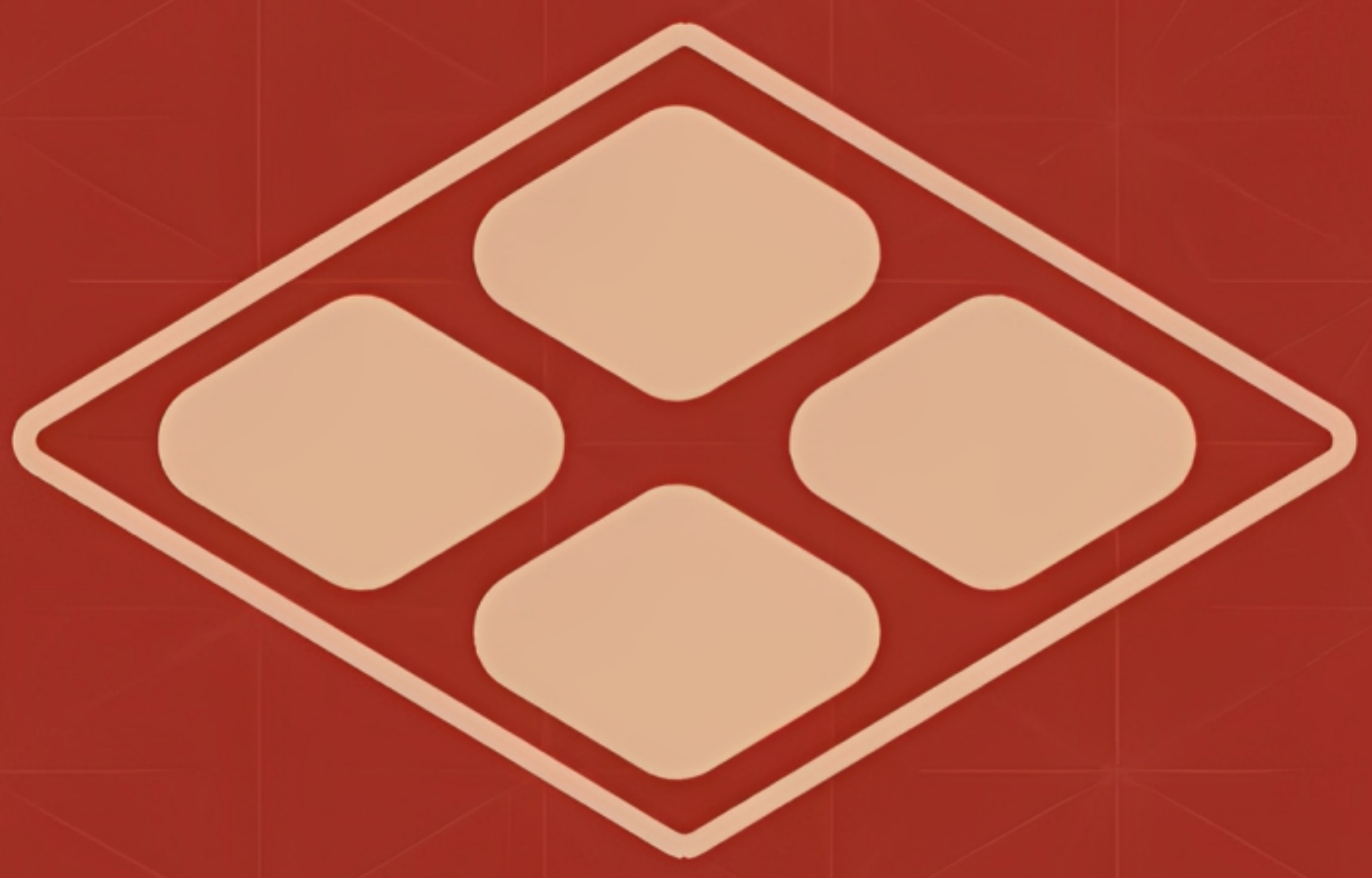
Taiwanese Vintage Toy Pattern (Flat Square Diamond, Tang Dynasty–Japanese Fusion Style 1)

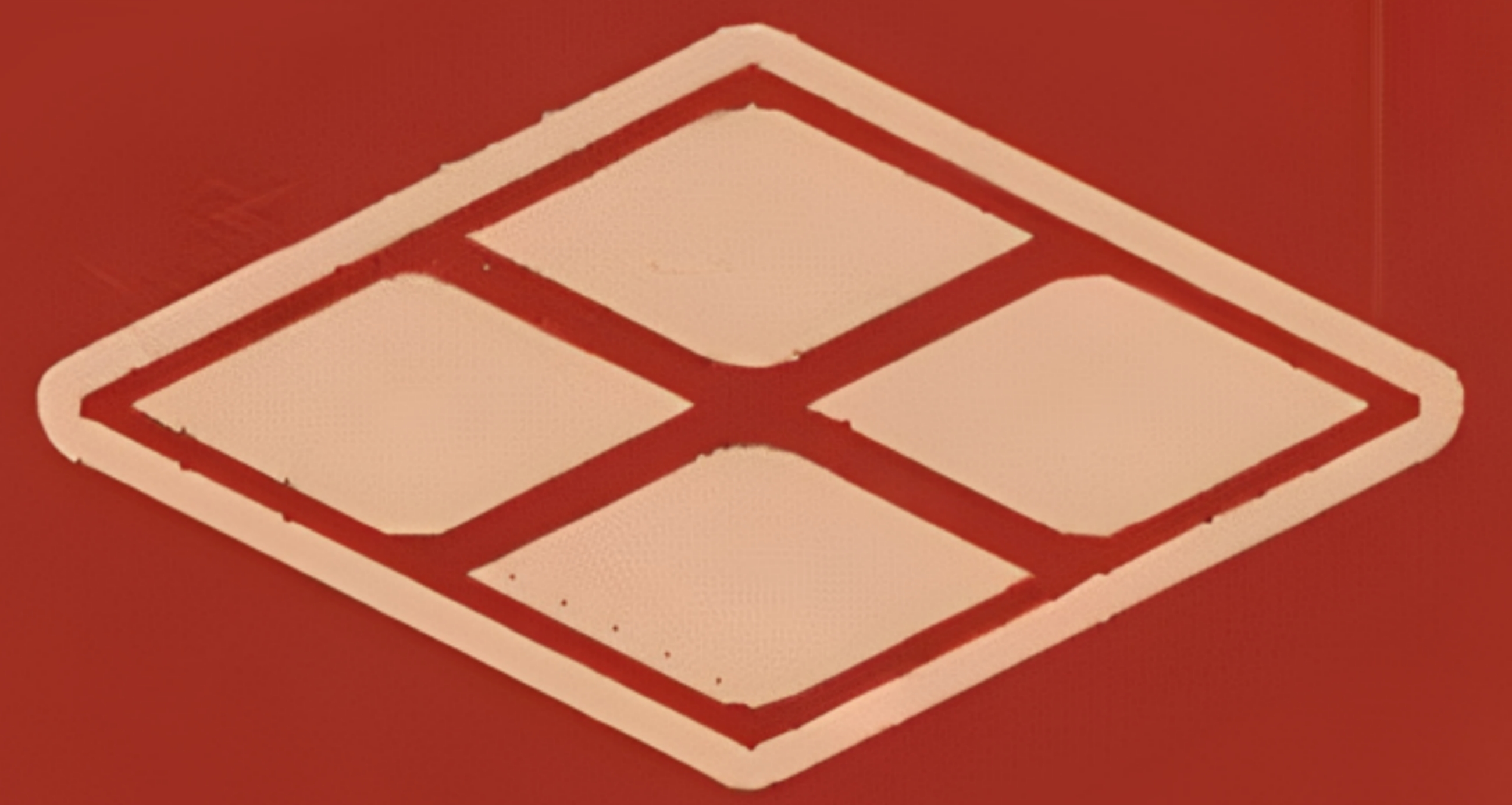
Taiwanese Vintage Toy Pattern (Flat Square Diamond, Tang Dynasty–Japanese Fusion Style 2)
