= Yu Lun Eve Lin =

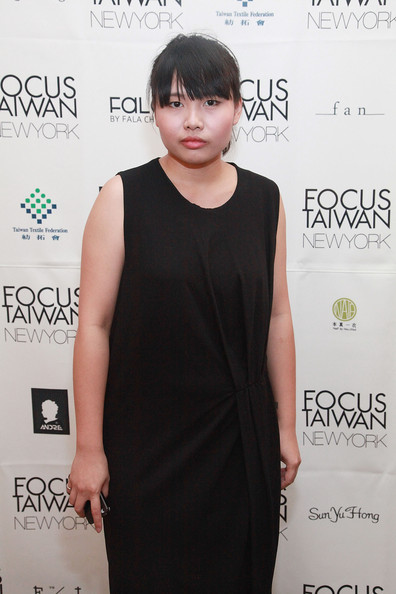
Yu-Lun Eve Lin

Yu Lun Eve Lin (Chinese: 林鈺倫, romanized: Lín yù lún) is a Taiwanese fashion designer and academic.

== Early life and education ==
Born in 1984, Yu Lun Eve Lin is from Taichung, Taiwain. She studied fashion design in the United Kingdom, graduating with a masters in fashion design from Central Saint Martins College of Arts and Design.

== Career ==
In 2010, Eve Lin held a winter women's wear fashion exhibit at The Coningsby Gallery. Titled "All About Eve, the clothing in the exhibit was black, grey, and white, and featured embroidery.

Eve Lin received the Red Dot Design Award for their illustration works twice: in 2014 for the publication on The Girl Who Worries Too Much and in 2018 for the educational illustration award. She has been profiled by Ellle Taiwan and Men's Uno Fashion Magazine.

Eve Lin has taught fashion design at Shih Chien University and has been a guest lecturer at the Fashion Institute of Technology (FIT) in New York and the Royal College of Art. Eve is also a curriculum developer focused on climate justice and an academic researcher at the London College of Fashion.

She is the author of Practice of Fashion Drawing (2020), a Taiwanese fashion textbook published by Qiying Culture. She also wrote a chapter in An Autoethnographic Narrative on Chinese Students' Quietness(2024), published by Routledge.

=== Publications and media ===
Eve's illustration was also showcased at the 7th International Sustainable Fur Free Fashion Festival.

=== Awards, selected works and projects ===
- The Girl Who Worries Too Much (2014) – Red Dot Award-winning publication
- The Girl Who Worries About Writing (2018) – Red Dot Award-winning educational project
- Practice of Fashion Drawing – National textbook for vocational fashion courses in Taiwan
