= Wang Chen Tsai-Hsia =

Taiwanese fashion designer

Wang Chen Tsai-hsia
- 王陳彩霞
- Born: 1951 (age 74–75); Changhua, Taiwan
- Other names: Madame Wang
- Occupation: Fashion designer
- Years active: 1978–present
- Known for: Founder and head designer of Shiatzy Chen

Wang Chen Tsai-hsia (王陳彩霞, born in 1951), also known as Madame Wang, is a Taiwanese fashion designer. She is the founder and head designer of the luxury brand Shiatzy Chen.

== Early life ==
Wang Chen Tsai-Hsia was born in Changhua, Taiwan in 1951. She was the eldest of seven children. She left school to help her family and started working as an apprentice in a ladies’ tailor in a town outside Taichung City. Her talent with needlework and embroidery allowed her to make a name for herself in the wealthy ladies' society of Taiwan.

== Career ==
In 1978, Madame Wang moved to Taipei with her husband Wang Yuan-Hong, a textile broker, and set up the fashion brand Shiatzy Chen. Her husband oversaw the business and finances, while Wang focused on the creative work. As people in Taiwan were obsessed with foreign labels, she mixed Western and Chinese elements in her designs in a style that she coined “Neo-Chinese”.

In 1990, Madame Wang opened a studio in Paris. In 2001, the brand opened a store on Rue Saint-Honoré, becoming the first Taiwanese fashion brand in the European market. In 2008, her label debuted in the Paris Fashion Week.

== Style ==
Wang Chen Tsai-Hsia is known for her designs with labor-intensive craftsmanship. She incorporates Chinese elements to Western cutting. For inspiration, Wang visits antique markets around the world during her travels.

Wang Chen Tsai-Hsia's 2021 sporty spring collection was inspired by the female warrior Hua Mulan. In this collection, Madame Wang embroidered cotton and used fresh fabrics like gingham.
