= Yupeng Shih =

Taiwanese fashion brand

- Company type: Privately held
- Industry: Fashion
- Founded: 2019
- Founder: Yupeng Shih (施育芃)
- Headquarters: Taipei, Taiwan
- Number of locations: Taiwan
- Key people: Yupeng Shih (施育芃)
- Products: Luxury goods
- Website: shiatzychen.com

YuPeng Shih (Chinese: 施育芃; pinyin: Shī Yùpéng) is a Taiwanese casual fashion brand founded by designer YuPeng Shih in 2019. Specialising in women's tulle skirts, the brand is known for its luxurious and vintage-inspired aesthetic. YuPeng Shih's designs emphasise detailed craftsmanship, featuring hand-tailored gowns, tulle skirts, and embroidered pieces that cater to the dynamic wardrobe needs of modern urban women. The brand's signature style blends elegance with an understated boldness, creating versatile garments that balance sophistication with a sense of spontaneity. YuPeng Shih aims to establish itself as Taiwan's leading tulle skirt brand.

== See also ==
- Douchanglee
- Shiatzy Chen
- Fashion in Taiwan
