= Naoko Tosa =

Japanese media artist (born 1961)

Tosa Naoko
- Born: October 22, 1961 (age 64); Fukuoka, Japan
- Occupation: Media artist
- Employer: Disaster Prevention Research Institute (DPRI)

Naoko Tosa (born 1961) is a Japanese media artist. In recent years Tosa has been creating artwork expressing Japanese tradition and culture without utilizing digital technology but rather by taking photographic captures of water and flowers in motion at 2000 frames per second. Much of her focus is based on Japanese Zen, Shinto and Rinpa traditions. Rinpa, a school of painting which traces its origins to 17th century Kyoto emphasizes natural subjects, refinement and the use of gold leaf, and is a key influence in Tosa's most recent works.

== Early life and education ==
After receiving a Ph.D. for Art and Technology research from the University of Tokyo, Tosa was a researcher at the ATR (Advanced Technology Research Labs) Media Integration & Communication Lab (1995–2001). Tosa was a fellow artist at CAVS, the Center for Advanced Visual Studies at the Massachusetts Institute of Technology from 2002 to 2004. From April 2005 to March 2011 she was a specific professor at the Academic Center for Computing and Media Studies, Kyoto University; from April 2011 to June 2018 she was a professor at the Organization for Information Environment, Kyoto University; from July 2018 to April 2022 she was a specific professor at the Graduate School of Advanced Integrated Studies in Human Survivability (GSAIS);and from May 2022 she has been a specific professor at the Research Center for Disaster Reduction Systems, Disaster Prevention Research Institute of the same university.

== Career ==
Naoko Tosa was named Japanese Cultural Envoy by the Agency for Cultural Affairs for the period of September 2016 – March 2017. Toas's work has been shown in the Museum of Modern Art, New York, USA, the National Museum of Art, Osaka, Toyama, Nagoya City Art Museum and Takamatsu city museum of Art. Her works are also part of the collections at the Japan Foundation, the American Film Association, the Japan Film Culture Center, The National Museum of Art, Osaka and the Toyama Prefecture Museum of Modern Art. Her work, "An Expression" is in the permanent collection of the Museum of Contemporary Art.

Naoko was one of the original members in the establishment of the Society for Art and Science in 2001. She has been serving as the Chair of IFIP TC16 Entertainment Computing Art & Entertainment since 2006 and was chair of the International Conference on Culture and Computing in 2013 and 2015.

In 2016, she was appointed as the 2016 Cultural Exchange Ambassador, visiting 10 cities in 8 countries, and spent a month in Times Square, NY, screening "Sound of Ikebana Spring" on over 60 billboards and conducting cultural exchanges.

== Collection ==
=== Takamatsu Art Museum, Kagawa ===
- Pleasure (1984)

=== MoMA(The Museum of Modern Art), New York ===
- An Expression (1985)

=== O Art Museum, Tokyo ===
- TRIP (1985)

=== The National Museum of Art, Osaka ===
- ECSTACY(1986)

=== Toyama Prefectural Museum of Art & Design, Toyama ===
- GUSH! (1989)

=== Nagoya City Museum, Aichi ===
- TRANCE (1989)

=== Kenninji Temple, Kyoto ===
- Sansui on the Cloud (2012)
- Silence (2012)

=== Shimadzu Future Collaboratory, Kyoto ===
- UTSUROI (2015)

== Works ==
=== Video art ===
- Pleasure (1984)
- An Expression(1985)
- TRIP(1985)
- ECSTACY(1986)
- GUSH!(1989)
- KABUKI-MONO(2011)
- Asian Saint(Under water Sansui with Four Gods(2012))
- Sound of Ikebana Four season(2013)
- Space Flower(2014)
- Wind God and Thunder God(2014)
- MIYABI(2015)
- UTSUROI(2015)
- Volcano(2015)
- Flowers and Dragons (2016)
- Itookashi (2016)
- Renjishi (2016)
- Dragon (2017)
- Four Asian Gods in Lacquer (2017)
- Genesis (2017)
- Noh art work “well” (2019)
- Raindrop Voice (2019)
- Dragon's Dream(2019)
- UBUGOE by Sound of Ikebana(2020)
- Magic Window (2020)
- TOSA RIMPA: Sansui(2021)
- Fifty babies's UBUGOE(2021)
- ZERO Gravity Sound of Ikebana(2021)
- Shimadzu Mirai Co-Creation Lab: "Entrance to Impress" Shimadzu Corporation Mirai Co-Creation Lab." (2022)
- Opening Video for the 150th Anniversary of Hanazono Junior High School (2022)
- NAOKO TOSA's Osaka Gas Methanation (2023)

=== Kyoto University Film Archive ===
- First Japanese Philosopher Kitaro Nishida, Philosopher of nothingness: From ZEN Buddhism made Japanese philosophy (2008~2011) 12min
- First Japanese Nobel Prize winner Hideki Yukawa, Creative human : From Eastern thinking to theoretical physics (2008~2011) 13min

=== Interactive art ===
- Neuro-Baby(1993-2000)

Selected for ACM SIGGRAPH 1993 Machine Culture
ARS Electronica Invited Exhibition
CG character that recognizes emotion and generates emotion from human voice inflection in real time.

- Networked Neuro-Baby(1995)

ACM SIGGRAPH 1995 Emerging Technology Invited Demo
Robot hand-connected neurobaby system for cross-cultural translation of emotional expressions over the Internet University of Tokyo: joint research with Hidenori Hashimoto, Associate Professor, and Kaoru Sezaki, Associate Professor

- Interactive Poem (1997)

A poet system that recognizes the meaning and emotion of words from the human voice and outputs them in real time to a CG character who reads poems in a renga-like style with a human. Winner of the Grand Prize of the L'Oréal (an award given for research in the arts and sciences)

- Interactive Theater "Romeo & Juliet"(1997-1999)

An interactive theater system that allows people to play the main character and create their own stories by recognizing the meaning of words and emotions and outputting them in real time from the voices and actions of multiple people.
Winner of the Berlin International Film Festival, New Media category

- Unconscious Flow (1999)

A system that expresses the degree of communicative resonance based on human heartbeat information (ecological information) and hand movements (psychological perspective).
Awarded in the Interactive Art category at Ars Electronica, the world's largest international conference on digital content (sponsored by Austrian National Broadcasting Corporation)

- Emotion Translation Email Software (2001)

Netware that uses CG characters to express the emotions intended in the text of an e-mail, and uses gestures to express them to the recipient, and uses speech synthesis to read them out loud.

- Interactive Manzai(2001-2002)

Co-researcher: Yoshimoto Kogyo Co.
Studied unconscious information contained in words, and designed a computer system for "comic dialogue," which is an exchange of feelings, to realize an interactive dialogue.
SCI 2002 Best Paper Award.

- Help! Doraemon (2002-2005)

Collaboration with Fujiko Fujio.

- Zen Computer (Zenetic Computer) (2002-2004)

Collaborators: Peter Davis, Seigo Matsuoka, Toshinori Kondo
Cultural computing to experience the culture and spirit of Zen. Exhibited at the following locations.
MIT Museum Main Gallery (2003.10.24-11.13) MIT News

- Landscape Zen by Computer: ZENetic Computer, Kita Shoin, Kodaiji Temple (2004.5.10-6.6)

KYOTO Film Festa "Future Film DNA" The Museum of Kyoto (2003.11)

- "Inter-Culture Computing: ZENetic Computer" ACM SIGGRAPH 2004 Emerging Technology Venue.

=== iPhone app ===
- Sansui Ink Painting

=== Photography art ===
- August iris flower listening to the song of flame(2022)
- Silence (2012), dedication work for Kenninji Temple
- Sansui on the Cloud (2012), dedication work for Kenninji Temple
- Cosmic Nostalgia (2021), homage to André Malraux

=== Sculpture ===
- Pure Water (2011)
- ZEN:Nothingness is everything(2019)
- Ikebana in ZERO Gravity(2019)
- Light in the Shadows(2020)
- Light of Ikebana(2020)
- Eternal Room by UTSUROI(2020)
- Research on the shape of future vehicles by Sound of Ikebana(2020)
- Table of Light(2021)
- Caustics Light(2021)
- Maitreya looking at Nara(2021)
- maitreya-and-hearing-voices(2021)

=== Art × Fashion ===
- Collaboration with DUREN(2021-2023)
- Regional Revitalization AR Fashion (2023)
- Tokyo Fashion Show – Kyōgen “Tsukushi” (2022)
- Sound of Ikebana Fashion(2021)
  - 2024 S/S (2023)
  - 2024 F/W (2024)
  - 2025 S/S (2024)
  - 2025 F/W (2025)

=== NFT Artworks ===
- NFT Art "Zero Gravity" (2022)

=== Disaster Prevention Artworks ===
- Kyoto University Disaster Prevention Research Institute × Keihan Main Line × Toppan Printing 3.11 Memorial Disaster Preparedness AR Art (2023)
- Disaster Prevention Expo (2025)

=== Expo 2025 Osaka, Kansai, Japan ===
- Zero Gravity Art(2025)

=== Art Innovation Framework ===
- Kyoto University Art Innovation Framework(2020)
- CRAFTED TOUR "Art Innovation Sound of Ikebana Experience Program"(2020)

== Main Exhibitions (Invitational) ==
- 2025 New York Fashion Week 2025 F/W
- 2024 New York Fashion Week 2025 S/S
- 2024 tagboat Art Fair
- 2024 New York Fashion Week 2024 F/W
- 2023 EAST HAWAII CULTURAL CENTER - RECONCEPTUALIZING TRADITIONS IN JAPANESE THEATER
- 2023 New York Fashion Week 2024 S/S
- 2023 Regional Revitalization NFT AR Fashion Show
- 2023 10th FASHION WORLD TOKYO APRIL
- 2022 Fashion Week Brooklyn
- 2022 Exhibition at the Academic Marche for the 125th Anniversary of Kyoto University
- 2022 NAOKO TOSA Zero Gravity NFT Exhibision（Target Aeon Malls/ JAPAN）
- 2022 Naoko Tosa: Zero Gravity (J-COLLABO/ NY, U.S.A) (Oncyber)
- 2021 METoA-Ginza HOPE-FOR-UNIVERSE (METoA GINZA/JAPAN)
- 2009 Cultural Computing “i.plot” “Hicth Haiku” (Kyoto University Museum/JAPAN)
- 2006 Sense of Computer (Kyoto University Museum/JAPAN)
- 1994 Broadcasting Week in NHK (NHK main Building TOKYO/JAPAN)
- 1993 A-Life World Exhibition (Tokyo International Art Museum/JAPAN)
- 1993 A-Life World Exhibition (Tokyo International Art Museum/JAPAN)
- 1993 ARS ELECTRONICA '93 -Artificial Life Art Exhibition- (Linz, AUSTRIA)
- 1992 18th Japan Society of Image Arts & Sciences Exhibition (Musashino Art University TOKYO/JAPAN)
- 1992 NICOGRAPH '92 Special Exhibition [Virtual Reality] (Ikebukuro Sunshine City Hall TOKYO/JAPAN)
- 1991 High Tech Art Exhibition (Ginza Matsuya TOKYO/JAPAN)
- 1990 Monveliarl International Video Festival (Monveliarl FRANCE)
- 1990 Locarno International Video Festival (Locarno SWITZERLAND)
- 1989 4th Contemporary Art Festival - Image of Today (Toyama Prefectural Modern Art Museum JAPAN)
- 1989 TEAM VIDEO GALLERY (World Design Exhibition Nagoya JAPAN)
- 1989 New Generation Computer Graphics Exhibition (Kawasaki City Museum JAPAN)
- 1988 The Brisbane International Leisure Center "Japan Techno Plaza" (Brisbane AUSTRALIA)
- 1988 Video Festival; Japan Now - Sweden Now (Kalturhuset, SWEDEN)
- 1988 International High Technology Art Exhibition (Tsukashin Hall Kobe JAPAN)
- 1988 EXPERIMENTAL MEDIA FESTIVAL; MIAMI WAVES (Miami-Dade Community College, U.S.A.)
- 1988 Fukui International Video Biennale (Phoenix Plaza Fukui, JAPAN)
- 1988 EXPERIMENTS IN ANIMATION Exhibition (O Art Museum TOKYO /JAPAN)
- 1988 Japan Leading Scientific Technology Art Exhibition (Taiwan Prefectural Art Museum)
- 1987 Festival International de Film Et Video de Future (Montreal, CANADA)
- 1987 WAVEFORMS: VIDEOS FROM JAPAN (San Francisco U.S.A.)
- 1986 OPEN FILM BOX vol. 9 (Fukuoka Prefectural Art Museum JAPAN)
- 1986 Camerino International Video Festival (Camerino ITALY)
- 1986 Video Cocktail 3 (Hara Art Museum TOKYO/JAPAN)
- 1986 Japanese Video Art Exhibition; Scanners (Air Gallery U.K.)
- 1986 Australian National Broadcasting Systems ”International Video Art Section (AUSTRALIA)
- 1986 Monveliarl International Video Festival (Monveliarl FRANCE)
- 1986 NEW VIDEO JAPAN (Long Beach Museum of Art U.S.A.)
- 1986 NEW VIDEO JAPAN (Museum of Modern Art N.Y. U.S.A.)
- 1985 Video Cocktail 2 (Gallery NEWS TOKYO/JAPAN)
- 1985 Video Culture Canada '85 (Toronto CANADA)
- 1984 Personal Focus '84 (Image Forum TOKYO/JAPAN)
- 1984 Video Cocktail (Komai Art Gallery, Ikebukuro Seibu Studio 200 TOKYO)
- 1983 Personal Focus '83 (Fukuoka Prefectural Art Museum JAPAN)
- 1983 Video Art Exhibition for New Generation (Komai Art Gallery TOKYO)
- 1982 Art Function Exhibition (Fukuoka City Art Museum JAPAN)
- 1982 Video Independent Exhibition (Osaka Contemporary Museum Center JAPAN)
- 1981 Women Painter Exhibition (Fukuoka City Art Museum JAPAN)

== Awards ==
- 1996, best paper award from the IEEE International Conference on Multimedia;
- 1997, the L’Oreal Grand Prix for research combining art and science; 2000, honorary mention in the Interactive Art section in ARS Electronica;
- 2004, 2nd Prize for Nabi Digital Storytelling Competition of Intangible Heritage, organized by UNESCO.

Tosa received research funding from the agency for cultural affairs in Japan 2000; Japan Science and Technology Agency 2001–2004; France Telecom R&D 2003–2005; Taito Corp. 2005–2008, from the National Institute of Information and Communications Technology (NICT) 2005–2008.

== Media Appearances, etc. ==
=== Internet ===
- NHK WORLD JAPAN “Art Frontier: Creators Forge New Paths into the Future”(2022.03.12)
- DHL "NAOKO TOSA: Sound of Ikebana"(2024)
- ZOZO fashion tech news "Expressing Japanese Culture with Technology: Sound of Ikebana"(2024)
- Weekly NY Life(2024)

=== Talk Live ===
- TEDxKyoto University(2015)
- Transcending Time: Japanese Art & Technology(2024)
