= Malan Breton =

Taiwanese-born fashion designer

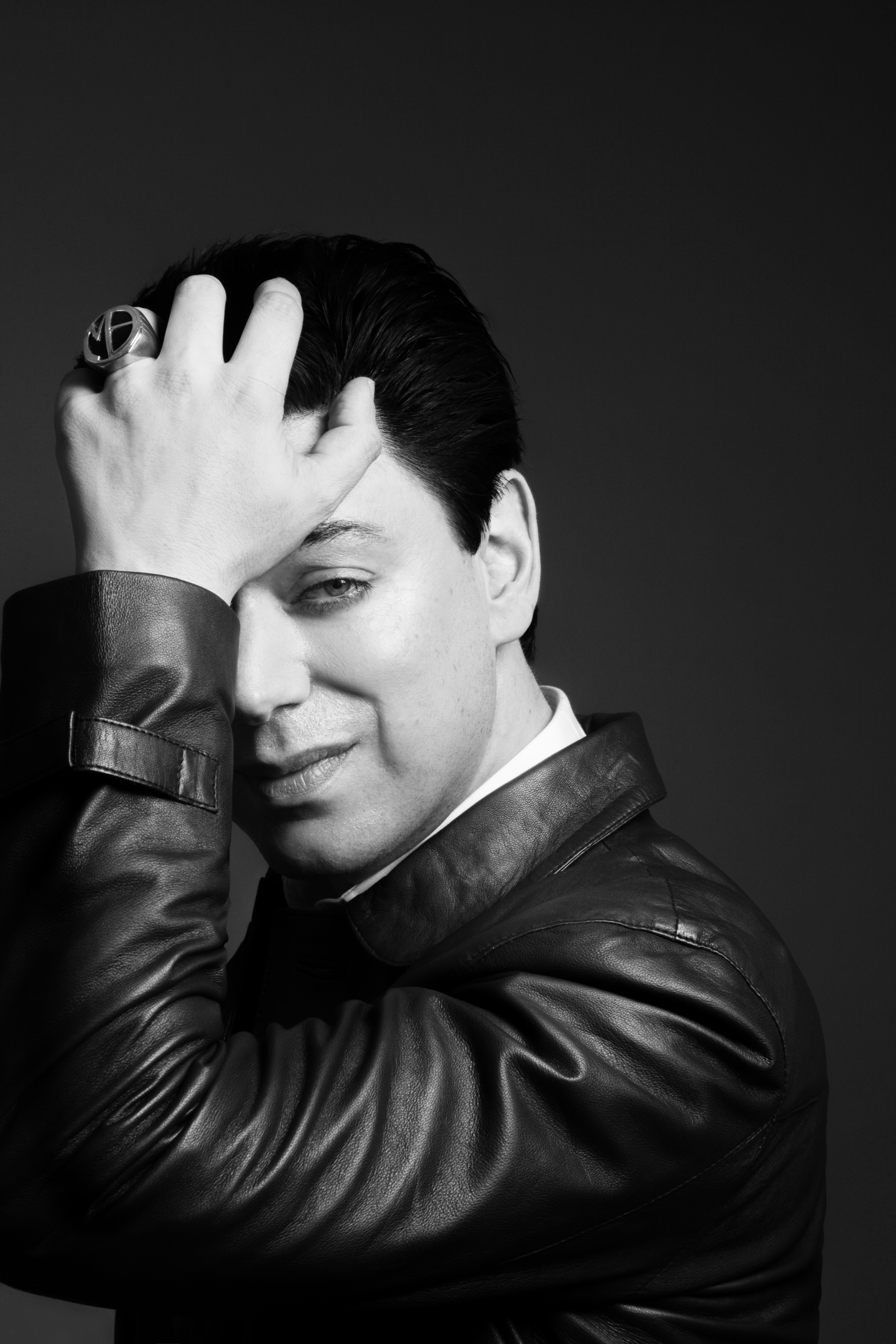
- Malan Breton
- Born: 16 June 1973 (age 53); Taipei, Taiwan
- Education: The Juilliard School, Circle in the Square
- Occupations: Musician; actor; producer; director; dancer; fashion designer; singer; songwriter; fashion model
- Years active: 1996–present
- Musical career
- Genres: R&B; pop; rock
- Instruments: Vocals; piano; tuba; violin
- Labels: Cinemalan; AWAL Distributor
- Website: www.malanbreton.com

Malan Breton (born 16 June 1973) is a Taiwanese-born fashion designer. He is known for his work as a film, and music video director, as a columnist, costume designer, popular musician, television, film producer, Goodwill Ambassador to Taiwan, Ambassador to UK Parliament / Parliamentary Society, and actor.

Breton launched his namesake fashion label "Malan Breton" in 2005, Malan Breton Homme in 2010, and Fantôme Malan Breton in 2012. On 27 March 2020, Malan Breton released his first music single, a cover of "Somethin' Stupid", featuring Japanese pop band Emergency Tiara. He is also known for his philanthropic work in the United Kingdom, and the United States.

== Early life ==
Breton was born in Taipei, Taiwan. He began designing fashion at the age of eleven but grew up acting as a performer in the entertainment industry. He never went to design school and is self-taught as a designer.

== Career ==
In 1996, Breton moved to New York to cast for the New York fashion week Spring 1997 Collection shows at 7th on Sixth. As a model, Breton was featured by photographers and directors Herb Ritts, Len Prince and Hype Williams. Thom Oliphant, Joseph Kahn, thus getting his start in fashion design as a stylist. His mentors in fashion include Arnold Scaasi, also noted is his training on Savile Row. In 2005, Breton was one of twelve new designers to watch for on the New York runway in WWD Women's Wear Dailies "Cheat Sheet". One of Malan Breton earliest public appearances includes Project Runway (2006), in which he took 14th place, being the second contestant kicked off of the show.

Breton was featured on an episode of E! Television Fashion Emergency when he performed in the 1998 revival of Cabaret on Broadway. From 1999 to 2005, he was the promo voice of ESPN Extreme Sports and the promo voice for ABC Sports.

In 2007, he opened the first Malan Breton flagship store in NYC. In 2008 Malan Breton added an Accessory range. In 2010, added a menswear range called Malan Breton Homme. In 2008, Breton was featured on an episode of Australia's Next Top Model (Cycle 4, episode New York, New York). Breton was featured on MTV News (episode 'Project Runway' Alumni Stand Out at New York Fashion Week). In 2009, he appeared on MTV Detox (Jim Cantiello With No Pants!). In 2011, Malan Breton Homme was featured on MTV News (It's A 'Party And Rock And Roll' Lifestyle For Jim). In 2010, Breton designed costumes for the NBC game show Minute to Win It, and again in 2011. In 2012, Malan Breton added Fantôme Malan Breton clothing.

In 2015, Breton starred with Celeste Holm in the comedy College Debts. In 2016, Malan Breton was named Ambassador to Taiwan to the office of Tourism. In 2017, Breton appeared on an episode of Good Day New York featured on FOX Television Stations, and partnered with Tokenly and Sohomuse to "launch the first blockchain-powered digital experience for the fashion industry".

In 2020, Breton held his first 3D online fashion show, featuring CGI-designed models. On 27 March 2020, Malan Breton with Emergency Tiara released a cover of the music single "Somethin' Stupid". In December 2020, Malan Breton duetted with Consuelo Costin on a charity cover of the song "I'll Be Home for Christmas".

== Directing ==
Breton was the subject/host/co-producer of The Malan Show featured on BravoTV.com as a weekly web series. It followed the process of making it in America as an independent designer.

- XVJC: Julius Caesar (2019)
- 8 Counts a Dancer (Documentary) (2018)
- Kristine W "Stars" Music Video (2018) The video ranked number one on the Billboard charts.
- Malan Breton a Journey to Taiwan (Documentary) 2015. The film won the 2015 NYIFF Award for best documentary short.
- Immortal (animated short) In 2022 "Immortal" won the London Fashion Film Festival Award for best 2D/3D animation, it was also chosen by Cameramoda as an official selection for Fashion Film Festival Milan presented by Cinecittà.

== Fashion columnist ==
Malan Breton contributed weekly to OK! magazine's column "Malan's Musings". A news columnist at the 82nd Academy Awards for OK! magazine, Breton wrote a column called "Malan Breton Takes on Oscar Fashion!" He and Jeannie Mai gave red carpet fashion commentary for the 2012 Golden Globes Awards for OK! magazine.

== Costume design ==
Malan Breton has designed specialty costumes for NBC's New Year's Eve (2020), Golden Globe Awards (2019), WWE SmackDown (2019), 73rd Tony Awards (2019), The Real Housewives of Beverly Hills (2019), Quantico (2018), The Voice UK (2018), 2018 Laurence Olivier Awards (2018), The Real Housewives of Beverly Hills (2018), Dick Clark's New Year's Rockin' Eve (2018) Specialty Costumes for the country music band Florida Georgia Line, Kristine W Stars (2018), RuPaul's Drag Race (2017), America's Next Top Model (2017), American Music Awards (2017), BET Awards Specialty costumes for Ray J (2017), Gay for Play Game Show Starring RuPaul (2017), The Real Housewives of New York City (2016), Vanderpump Rules (2017), America's Best Dance Crew MTV (2016), Style Code Live (2016), The Real Housewives of New York City (2011), Minute to Win It (2010 - 2011), Australia's Next Top Model (2008), A-List Awards Bravo (2008).

== Awards ==
- 2022: UK S.A.L. "British Fashion Designer of the Year" Award
- 2022: Fashion Film Festival Milan - "Cameramoda" National Chamber of Italian Fashion Cinecitta Jury Selection, "Best Animated Short Film", "Immortal"
- 2021: London Fashion Film Festival Jury Selection for "best 2D 3D Animation" for the, Spring Summer 2021, AI VR fashion film "Immortal" with DNABLOCK Ai
- 2021: UK Parliament/Parliamentary Society AFS Award for charitable efforts for children during the pandemic
- 2021: Carmarthen Bay Film Festival, UK "Best Animated Short" [Nominee] "Immortal" with DNABLOCK Ai
- 2019: UK "Ambassador of the Arts" for his work in fashion, for UK Parliament and the Parliamentary Society for Arts, Sports, and Fashion, by Director Rebeca Riofrio, presided over by Zac Goldsmith PC.
- January 2016 CNA News Taiwan noted Breton, as ambassador to Taiwan for Tourism.
- 2016 Taiwan Tourism Award
- 2016 Fashion Group International "Rising Star" (Menswear),
- 2015 Taiwan Tourism Award,
- NYIFF Best Documentary Short, Director "Malan Breton A Journey to Taiwan";
- 2014 United Colours of Fashion "Fashion Icon",
- 2014 European Fashion Council, Bulgarian Fashion Awards, "Eirene";
- Nominated for the WGSN Global Fashion Award "Outstanding Collaboration, Malan Breton and NBC".

== Collaborations ==
- Taiwan Breton designed the official government work uniforms, and stationery.
- Rado (watchmaker)
- Smithsonian American Art Museum
- Princeton University Breton Lectured on "Optimizing Your Personal Style"
- Lalique
- Marilyn Monroe Estate, and Jewelry Television
- EVA Air (On the 2015 film "Malan Breton- A Journey to Taiwan")
- China Airlines (On the 2015 film "Malan Breton- A Journey to Taiwan")
- WGSN (trend forecasting)
- Swarovski
- OK!
- Bravo (U.S. TV network)
- MTV
- Reprise Records
- Brother Industries
- Nintendo
- Fancy Feast
- Cosmetic Executive Women
- Zoya
- Joico
- Toni & Guy
- J Renee
- Church & Dwight
- Giorgio Brutini
- Michela Rigucci

== See also ==
- Chinese people in New York City
- LGBT culture in New York City
- New Yorkers in journalism
- Taiwanese people in New York City
