= Shiatzy Chen =

Taiwanese luxury fashion house

Shiatzy Chen 夏姿．陳
- Company type: Privately held
- Industry: Fashion
- Founded: 1978
- Founder: Wang Chen Tsai-Hsia (王陳彩霞); Wang Yuan-hong (王元宏)
- Headquarters: Taipei, Taiwan
- Number of locations: Worldwide boutiques
- Key people: Wang Chen Tsai-Hsia (王陳彩霞), head designer; Harry Wang (王子玮), CEO
- Products: Luxury goods
- Subsidiaries: Cha Cha Thé/采采食茶文化
- Website: shiatzychen.com

Shiatzy Chen (Chinese: 夏姿．陳; pinyin: Xiàzī Chén) is a Taiwanese luxury fashion house founded in 1978 by Wang Chen Tsai-Hsia (王陳彩霞) and her husband Wang Yuan-Hong. Its style is described as "neo-Chinese chic", combining the aesthetics of Chinese clothing and handicraft with Western styles.

== History ==
In 1978, Wang Chen Tsai-Hsia and her husband, Wang Yuan-hong (王元宏), a businessman who was in the textile trade, founded the Shiatzy International Company Limited in 1978. In 1987, the company added a menswear line, including off-the-peg changpaos intended for weddings and traditional engagement parties. A popular line is their quilted, often reversible, winter jackets, available in a wide range of styles, fabrics, patterns and color combinations.

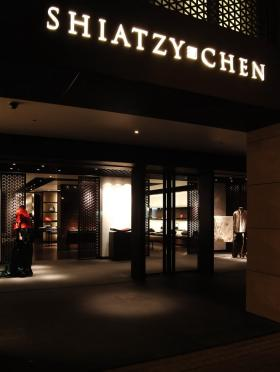
Shiatzy Chen store (Taipei, Taiwan)

In 1990, Shiatzy Chen set up a studio in Paris to learn more about Western dressmaking techniques. This studio also serves as a training center for Taiwanese dressmakers and designers. The company opened a flagship store in Paris in 2001. In 2003, after Harry Wang (the son of the company's founders) became CEO, the company entered the Chinese market, opening a third flagship store in Shanghai, on The Bund in October 2005; with further stores in Hong Kong and Beijing. Restoration on the building began in late 2001. The interior was designed by Indonesian designer Jaya Ibrahim. The company aimed to have 50 stores in mainland China by 2010 in addition to their 48 outlets in Taiwan, 23 directly managed stores and 25 department store counters.

The label has been listed on the London-based Financial Times pick of what is hot in 2004. It was also deemed the most popular fashion brand in Taiwan by The Wall Street Journal Asia.

In 2007, Shiatzy Chen opened a second factory, measuring 6000 square meters, in Shanghai and designed by German architect Johannes Hartfuss to accommodate a workforce of more than 1,000 employees, including dressmakers and embroiderers. The company expanded its catalogue with accessories and a line of furniture available from their three flagship stores in Taipei, Shanghai and Paris.

On 5 October 2008, Shiatzy Chen debuted at Paris Fashion Week, making Wang just the second Taiwanese design house (after YufengShawn, 馭風騷, in 2005) to have officially shown there. They presented their show at the École nationale supérieure des Beaux-Arts on the Left Bank in central Paris, and have shown there in subsequent years. On 9 November 2009, the company became a member of the Chambre syndicale du prêt-à-porter des couturiers et des créateurs de mode.

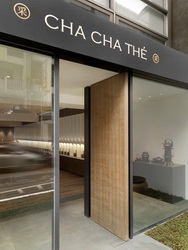
Cha Cha Thé store (Taipei, Taiwan)

In 2010, they held a record-breaking exhibition of 100 flower-themed dresses at the Taipei International Flora Exposition, presented on the longest catwalk seen in the Taiwan fashion business. In June 2010, Shiatzy Chen and the tea culture brand Cha Cha Thé (采采食茶文化, owned by Jack Wang, the brother of Harry Wang) opened an exclusive sales area in the Galeries Lafayette department store in Paris, along with a tea lounge in Taipei. In 2011 the company reported sales of about US$60 million.

In 2017, the company opened a boutique on avenue Montaigne in Paris, being the first Asian brand on that street. In August 2018, the brand launched a capsule collection with Disney.

In October 2020, the brand launched a sporty spring collection inspired by female warrior Hua Mulan. In this collection, Madame Wang tried embroidering on cotton and using fresh fabrics like gingham.

== Description ==
Shiatzy Chen is one of few homegrown designer labels in Taiwan with an international clientele including the former President of Taiwan Ma Ying-jeou, Taiwanese celebrities including Dee Shu, Patty Hou, Wang Leehom and Aska Yang; local politicians such as Jason Hu, businesswomen such as Pansy Ho and Shaw-Lan Wang; and British celebrities such as Elizabeth Hurley and Victoria Beckham. The Taiwanese market is the company's major source of revenue.

== Exhibitions ==
- The Evergreen Classic – Transformation of the Qipao - Hong Kong Museum of History (23 June-13 September 2010). Some of Shiatzy Chen's qipao-inspired designs were included in this exhibition.

== See also ==
- List of companies of Taiwan
- Douchanglee
- Yupeng Shih
