= Madame de Matignon =

Angélique-Marie Élisabeth Émilie de Matignon, née Le Tonnelier de Breteuil, married Countesse Goyon de Matignon and known in history as Madame de Matignon (14 March 1757 – 14 May 1833 in Paris), was a prominent fashion figure during the French Ancien Régime, known for her extravagant hairdressing expenses.

== Early life ==
Angélique-Marie Élisabeth Émilie was born on 14 March 1757 in Paris. She was the daughter of Louis Charles Auguste Le Tonnellier, Baron de Breteuil, French diplomat and politician (1730–1807), and Philiberte Jerôme de Parat de Montgeron (1737–1765/1786), the daughter of a wealthy financier. Her father was accredited as the French ambassador in Sweden in 1769. In 1773, her father was the French ambassador in Naples.

== Personal life ==
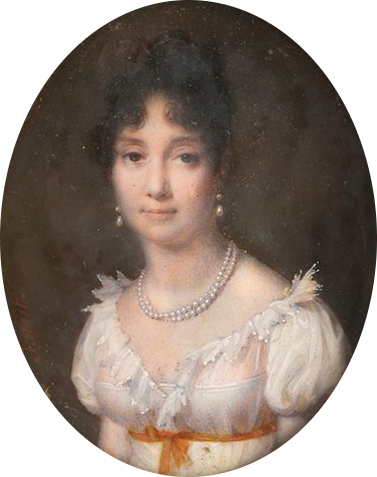
Anne-Louise-Caroline de Goyon de Matignon (1774–1846), duchess of Montmorency, daughter of Madame de Matignon

In 1772, Angélique-Marie Élisabeth Émilie de Matignon was married to Count Louis Charles Auguste Goyon de Matignon, Count de Gacé (1755–1773), the last male descendant of the maréchaux de Goyon de Matignon. Before she was widowed at the age of 16 when her husband died in Naples on 18 December 1773 at the age of 18, they were the parents of:

- Anne Louise Caroline de Goyon de Matignon, Countess de Gacé (1774–1846), who married Anne Charles François de Montmorency, 5th Duke of Montmorency, in 1788.

After the French Revolution in 1789, Matignon fled with her father and her lover Bishop of Pamiers (1747–1824) to Switzerland and Hamburg, Germany. They returned to France in 1802.

=== Fashion and extravagancy ===
Matignon was known for her sophisticated outfits ("Elle est d'une élégance achevée") and was a client of the famous fashion designer Rose Bertin. However, when returning to Paris from Naples in 1777, she ignored totally the new fashion of padded false bottom supporting the skirts e.g. Cul de Paris also known as culs postiches which was à la mode from c. 1773 to the 1780s. It is known that she paid her tailor 600 livres for one dress. The price for a very elaborate dress could be as high as 10,000 livres.

She gave her hairdresser Le sieur Beaulard, a fashion merchant also given in some sources mistakenly as "Baulard", 24 000 livres (e.g. pounds in silver) a year for styling her hair in a different way every day of the year. The value corresponds in 2014 euros some 1,2 million €.

Considering the enormous amount of money paid, it is not known whether this applied for styling her own hair or her wigs or both. Also it is not known how many employees Beaulard had in his shop. It is known that besides Rose Bertin, Le sieur Beaulard was among the following three top fashion merchants alongside Madame Eloffe and Mademoiselle Alexandre in the 1770s. Beaulard was praised as "a modiste without parallel, the creator and the poet ... because of his myriad inventions and delicious names for fripperies". As the coiffures got very high during the 1770s, Beaulard invented the coiffure à la grand-mére, a mechanical coiffure which could be lowered as much as one foot (30 cm) by touching a spring.

However, the King of the Parisian hairdressing was Léonard Autié, who was Queen Marie Antoinette's favourite coiffeur. The Queen also used the services of Beaulard, which caused rivalry with Queen's favourite fashion merchant Rose Bertin.

Styling and making huge and elaborate coiffures was labour-intensive and costly business. A chignon wig made to the opera singer Antoinette Saint-Huberty (Saint-Huberti) cost 232 livres. A coiffure was usually put together with clients own hair as a base, including metal wire and padded cushion supports, false hair (postiches), wheat starch, pomade made of lard and ornaments like flowers, feathers, jewelry, ribbons, gauze, lace and sometimes even with little objects like miniature ships. The number of wigs owned by Countess de Matignon is not known. One of her hairstyles is known to be called à la Jardinière (Gardener Style), adorned with an artichoke and broccoli sprouts.

The information known for the price of a (gentleman's) wig or perruque, varied from 12 livres for the cheapest one, to 35 livres for the most expensive one. It has been estimated that in the 1200 wig making and hairdressing shops worked some 10 000 employees or journeymen (garçons), usually 15 hours a day. In the 1780s there were some 900 master wig makers in Paris.
