= Mademoiselle Pagelle =

French fashion designer

Mademoiselle Pagelle (died 1774) was a French fashion designer (Couturier) and fashion merchant.

She had a shop in Paris named Trait Galant. She enjoyed great success and was a supplier of the royal courts of France and Spain. Among her clients were Louise Marie Adelaide de Bourbon, Louise-Elisabeth de Bourbon, Marguerite Caron de Rancurel (mistress of Charles, Count of Charolais) and Madame du Barry. She was the dressmaker for Madame du Barry during her years as the official royal mistress of Louis XV (1769–1774).

In history, Pagelle has become known as the mentor of Rose Bertin, who was employed in her establishment in 1763, and became her business partner when she secured the order for the trousseau of Louise Marie Adelaide de Bourbon; Bertin left the partnership to establish her own business in 1770, and became a fierce business rival. In 1774, Pagelle declared bankruptcy and her client Madame du Barry also (after a period as a client of Le Sieur Beaulard) also joined the clients of Rose Bertin.
