= Journal des Dames =

French women's magazine

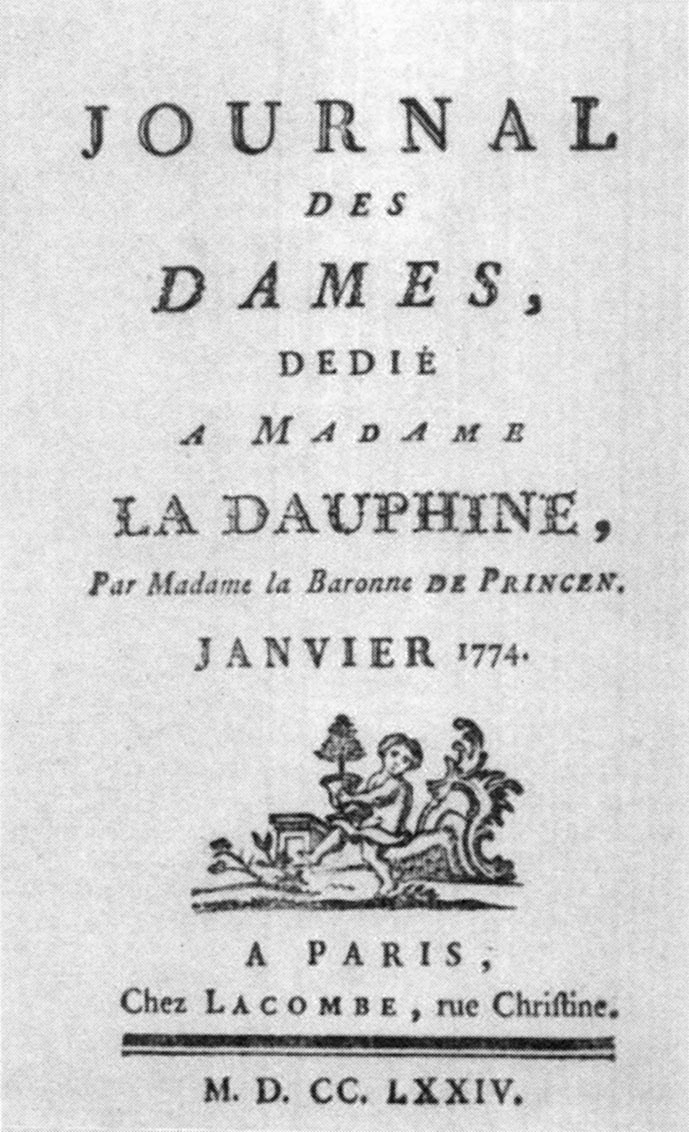
Journal des Dames, Paris, January 1774.

Journal des Dames was a French women's magazine, published between January 1759 and June 1778. It was a pioneering magazine as one of the first women's magazines as well as one of the first fashion magazines in France and Europe. It was also one of the first feminist magazines in Europe. In the 1770s, it was used to display the style of the fashion icon queen Marie Antoinette.

== History ==
The Journal des Dames was initially intended as a conventional magazine addressed to a female clientele and with a focus on fashion.

During the editors Madame de Beaumer and Catherine Michelle de Maisonneuve in the 1760s, the magazine became a radical feminist magazine addressing women's issues.

Between 1774 and 1778, the magazine was used by the fashion advisers of queen Marie Antoinette, Léonard Autié and Rose Bertin, to popularize Marie Antoinette as a fashion icon and role model by publishing the personal fashion and style of the queen.

== Editors ==
- Jean-Charles de Relongue de La Louptière (April–September 1761)
- Madame de Beaumer (October 1761–April 1763)
- Barnabé Farmian Durosoy (April–September 1762)
- Catherine Michelle de Maisonneuve (1763–1766/1769)
- Joseph Mathon de la Cour and Claude-Sixte Sautreau de Marsy (1766–1768)
- Marie-Emilie Maryon de Montanclos (January 1774–April 1775)
- Louis-Sébastien Mercier (May 1775–December 1776)
- Claude-Joseph Dorat (March 1777–June 1778)

== Se även ==
- Galerie des Modes et Costumes Français
