= Françoise Leclerc =

French fashion merchant

Françoise Leclerc (d. 1739) was a French fashion merchant and seamstress. She was a leading figure of the fashion world in Paris during the 1720s and 1730s, with a large clientele from within the French aristocracy, and the official seamstress of the queen of France, Marie Leszczyńska.

== Life ==
Françoise Leclerc was a successful seamstress i Paris. In 1721, she was noted to be the perhaps most successful seamstress in Paris, which clients among the members of the highest aristocracy.

On 25 December 1725, she was given a royal Warrant as the official seamstress of the new queen of France, Marie Leszczyńska, with the title "Dress maker of the Queen". This was a title of great status which contributed to her career and made her more sought after among the women of nobility. Among her clients were princess Louise de Rohan de Guemene, the comtess de Mailly, marchioness Françoise Paparel de la Fare, the princesse de Montauban, the comtess d'Auvrey and the comtesse Marie-Jeanne Phélypeaux de La Vrillière de Maurepas.

Her documents are preserved for the period of 1721 and 1739 and provides valuable information of the conditions of the Parisian seamstresses of the time, illustrating the system of credit accounts to which clients made regular payments, a system used also by Madame Eloffe half a century later.

She died in 1739 and was succeeded as the perhaps most successful seamstress and fashion designer by Marie Madeleine Duchapt.
