= Autié =

Autié is a French language surname. Notable people with the surname include:

- Jean-François Autié (1758–1794), hairdresser to Queen Marie Antoinette
- Léonard Autié (c. 1751–1820), French hairdresser and opera impresario
