= Catherine Girouard =

French painter

Catherine Girouard was a French painter active between 1759 and 1761.

Girouard's name has been attached to two surviving pastels, including one which was seized from its owners by the Nazis in Paris in 1941, but otherwise much of her biography remains obscure. She showed work at the salon de la Jeunesse in 1759, 1760, and 1761; the portraits which she displayed, in an unrecorded medium, attracted a great deal of commentary from a variety of reviewers, including a set of verses by an anonymous gentleman who claimed the honor of dining with her one evening. Madame de Beaumer, writing in 1761, stated that Girouard was active in both oils and pastels, and spoke favorably of the artist's work. Nothing further is recorded of Girouard, but it has been posited that she is identical to the Catherine-Marguerite Girouard of paroisse Saint-Roch who died in Paris in 1809.
