= Catherine Michelle de Maisonneuve =

Catherine Michelle de Maisonneuve (died 1774), was a French feminist, journalist and editor. She was the director of the women's magazine Journal des dames (1759–78) in 1763–1766. She developed the magazine into one of the most successful Publications in France at the time, and it became famous for its feminist content.

== Life ==
Catherine Michelle de Maisonneuve was the sister of a valet of the king's wardrobe and married to a rich man by the name Jouvert, but was bored with not having a purpose in life.

She bought the magazine from Madame de Beaumer in 1763. She continued her predecessor's policy of advocating women's independence by education and self support by work, but she did so in a much less confrontational and more subtle language, which proved more effective. In 1765, she was given a royal pension by the king.

In 1766, her magazine had become such a successful competitor to the Mercure de France that the Mercure asked the crown to censure her magazine for the benefit of the Mercure. She formally stepped down as managing editor as a result, though she continued to be active in practice until 1769, when she actually retired. The magazine was taken over by Marie-Emilie Maryon de Montanclos in 1774.

== See also ==
- List of women printers and publishers before 1800
