= Les mariages samnites =

Opéra comique in three acts by André Grétry

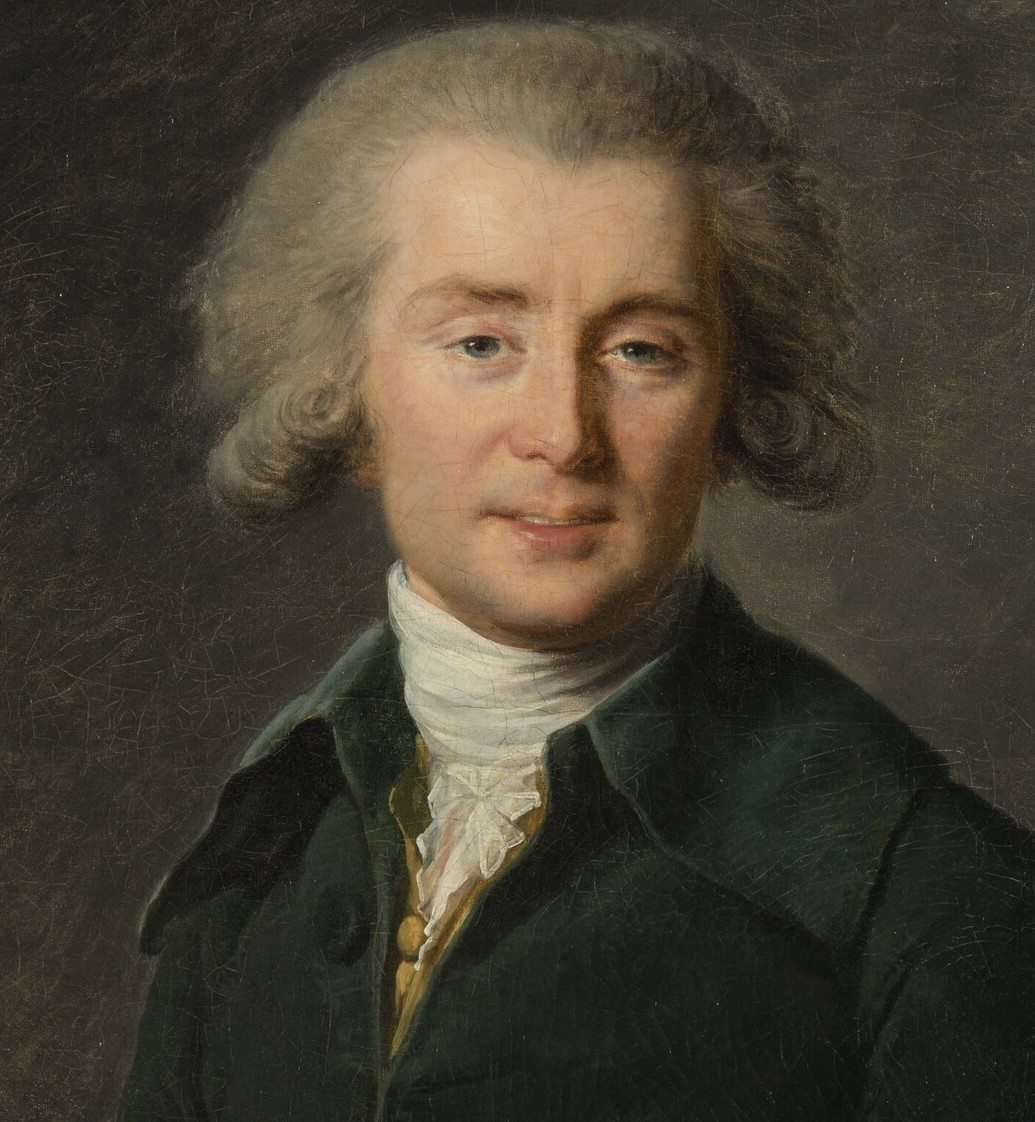
André Grétry

Les Mariages samnites (The Samnite Marriages) is an opéra comique, described as a drame lyrique, in three acts by André Grétry, The French text was by Barnabé Farmian Durosoy based on a work by Jean François Marmontel.

== Performance history ==
It was first performed on 12 June 1776 by the Comédie-Italienne (with which the Opéra-Comique was merged at that time) at the Hôtel de Bourgogne in Paris.

== Roles ==
Role	Voice type	Premiere Cast, 12 June 1776 (Conductor: - )
Agathis, in love with Céphalide	tenor	Jean-Baptiste Guignard, called Clairval
Parmenon, friend of Agathis	tenor	M Julien
Eumene, father of Agathis	basse-taille (bass-baritone)	Pierre-Marie Narbonne
Céphalide	soprano	Marie-Jean Trial, née Milon
Éliane, friend of Céphalide	soprano	Marie-Thérèse-Théodore Rombocoli-Riggieri, called 'Mlle Colombe l'Aînée'
Euphémie, mother of Céphalide	soprano	Louise-Frédérique Moulinghen, née Schrœder
The Chief of the Elders	basse-taille	Philippe-Thomas Ménier (also spelt Meunier)
The General		M Labussière
Two Samnite girls		Sophie Dufayel (ainée) and Marie Desbrosses

== Sources ==
=== Period sources ===
- Original libretto: Les Mariages Samnites, Drame lyrique en 3 Actes et en Prose (new edition), Paris, Duchesne, 1776 (accessible for free online at Gallica - B.N.F.
- Period printed score: Les Mariages Samnites Drame lyrique en 3 Actes et en Prose, Paris, Dezauche, s.d. (accessible for free online at Gallica - B.N.F.)

=== Modern sources ===
- Michel Brenet Grétry: sa vie et ses œuvres (F. Hayez, 1884)
- David Charlton Grétry and the Growth of Opéra Comique (Cambridge University Press, 1986)
- Ronald Lessens Grétry ou Le triomphe de l'Opéra-Comique (L'Harmattan, 2007)
- Mariages samnites, Les by Michael Fend, in 'The New Grove Dictionary of Opera', ed. Stanley Sadie (London, 1992) ISBN 0-333-73432-7
- Kutsch, K. J. and Riemens, Leo (2003). Großes Sängerlexikon (fourth edition, in German). Munich: K. G. Saur. ISBN 978-3-598-11598-1.
