= Pouf =

Hairstyle and a hairstyling support

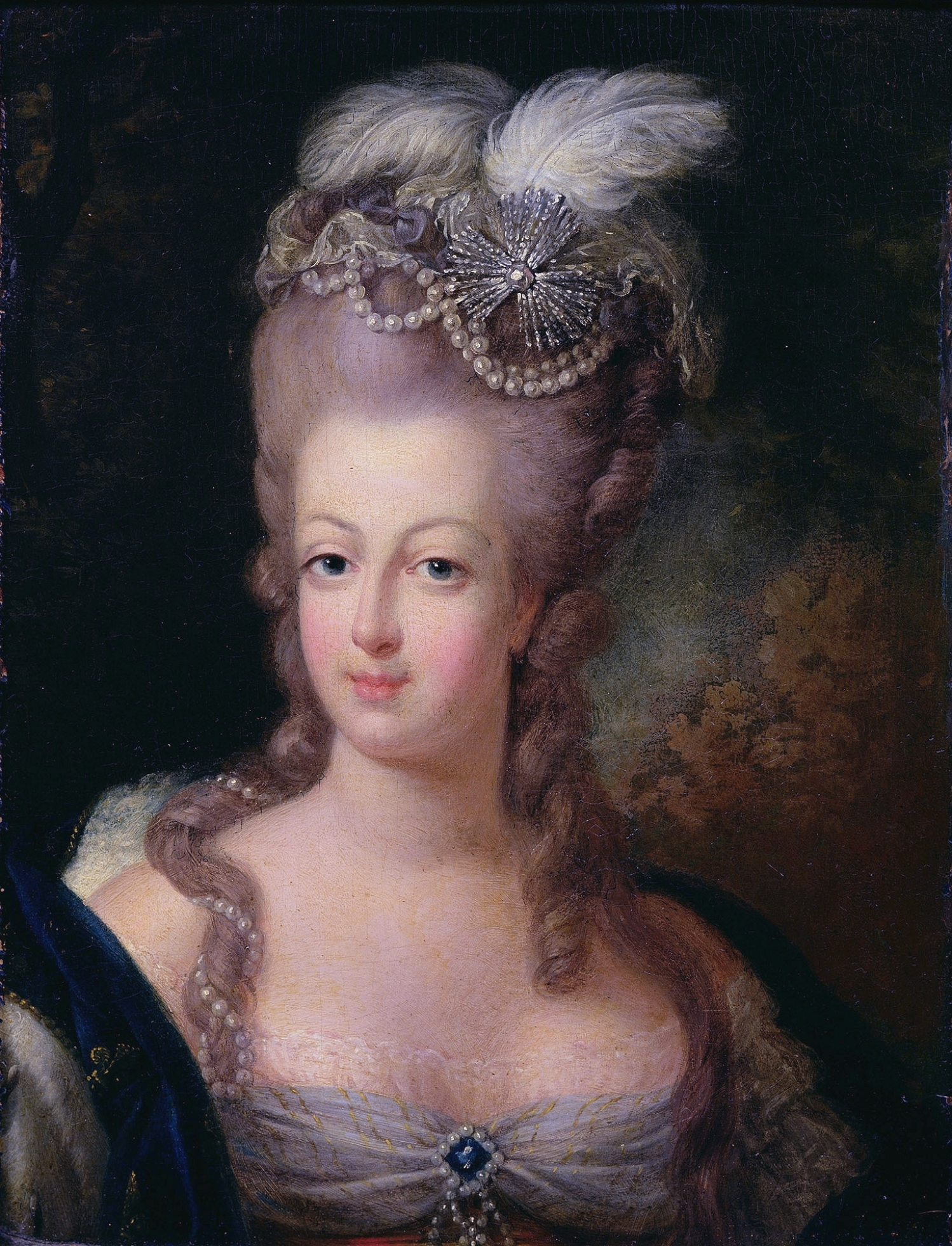
Queen Marie Antoinette shown wearing a pouf created by her hairdresser Léonard Autié (1775)

The pouf or pouffe, also "toque" (literally a thick cushion) is a hairstyle and a hairstyling support deriving from 18th-century France. It was made popular by the Queen of France, Marie Antoinette (1755–1793), when she wore it in June 1775 at the coronation of her husband Louis XVI, triggering a wave of French noblewomen to wear their hair in the same manner. The hairstyle would become popular across Europe in the 1770s.

== Beginning and evolution ==
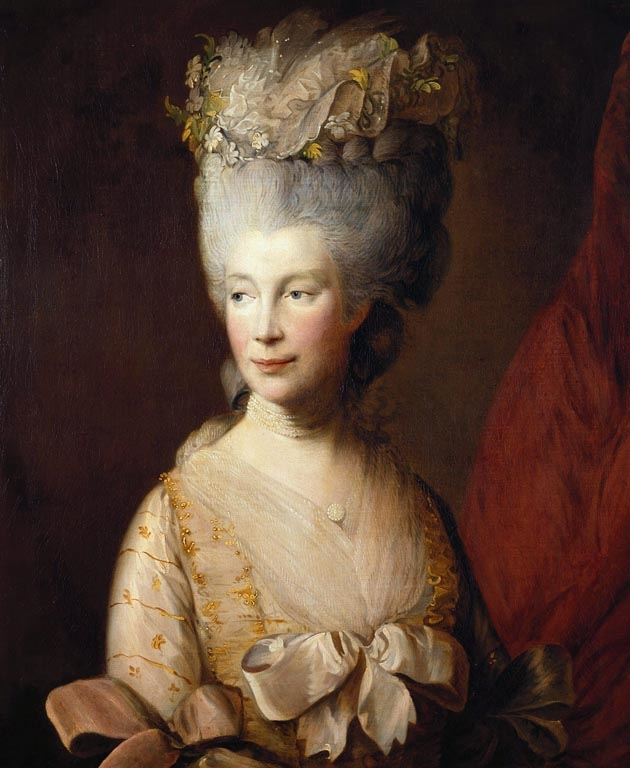
Queen Charlotte (1781)

Duchess of Devonshire (1782)

Marie Antoinette acquired the hairstyle, which was a creation from the famed hairdresser of the day, Léonard Autié. In April 1774, it was first sported as Le Pouf Sentimental by Duchess de Chartres at the Opera. The Duchesse's hairstyle was immense. 14 yards of gauze were wrapped around a tower as well as two figures representing the baby Duc de Beaujolais in his nurse's arms with an African boy (a particular favorite of the Duchess) at her feet. A parrot and a plate of cherries were also added.

From then on it quickly became widespread amongst noble and upper-class women in France during the time. It was highly creative and artistic, and women could literally wear their moods through strategically placed decorations and ornaments. Ships, animals and hundreds of other novelty items could be seen on these poufs. Other decorations included pearls, headdresses/hats, hair jewellery, and plumage, such as ostrich feathers.

The pouf became popular throughout Europe during the same era, with Georgiana Cavendish, the Duchess of Devonshire, the most notably famous for her hair in England. Queen Charlotte of Great Britain would also fashion her hair into the pouf. As the 1780s progressed the style in which the pouf was worn evolved to become somewhat more conservative. From 1789, upon the outbreak of the French Revolution, the pouf became more of a political weapon for women who supported the revolution in turning against their former Queen's most popular fashion statement.

As the 18th century came to an end, and the beginning of the 19th century, new fashions came along for hair, and the pouf, after the execution of Marie Antoinette, became history. Hairstyles similar to the pouf returned in both the 20th and 21st century with the more modern name beehive, worn by stars such as Dusty Springfield, The Ronettes, and Amy Winehouse.

== Styling ==
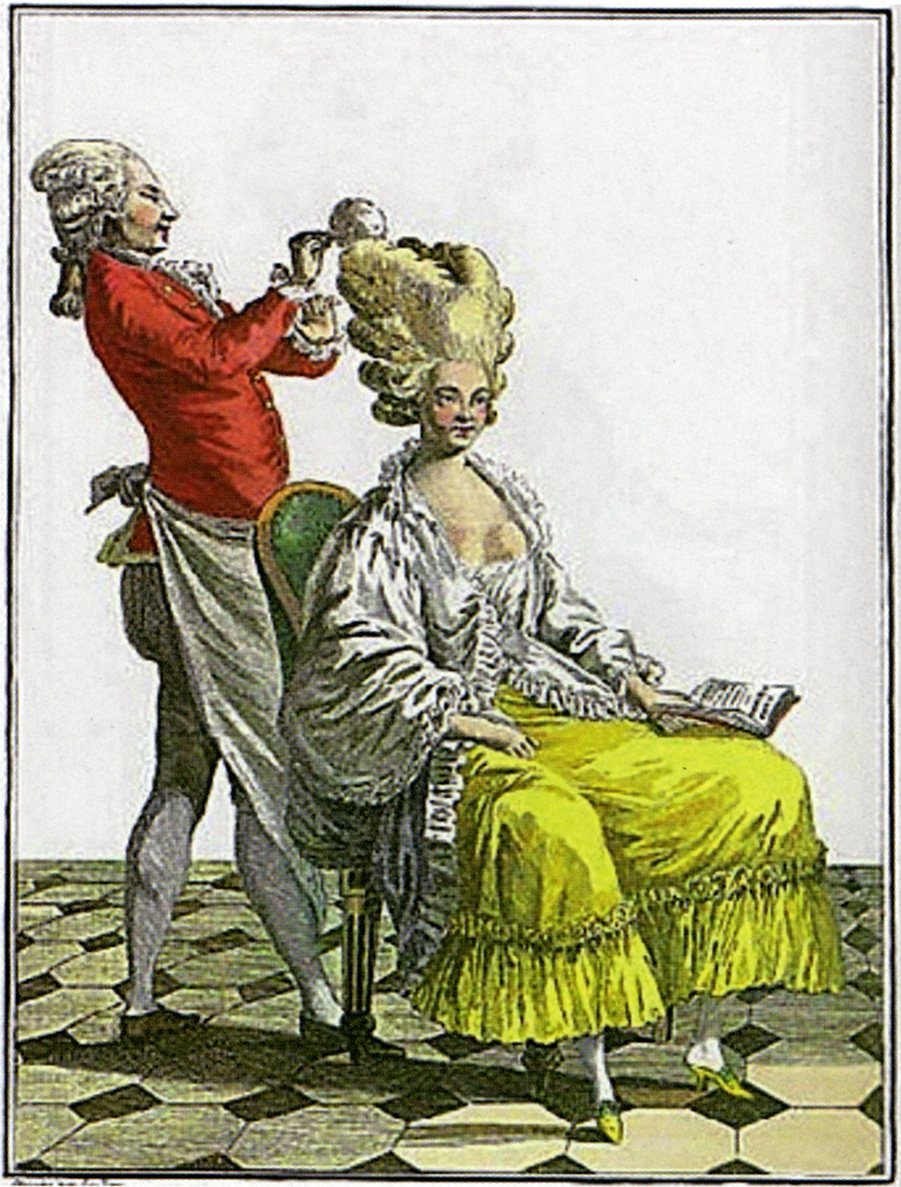
Léonard Autie preparing a pouf hairstyle

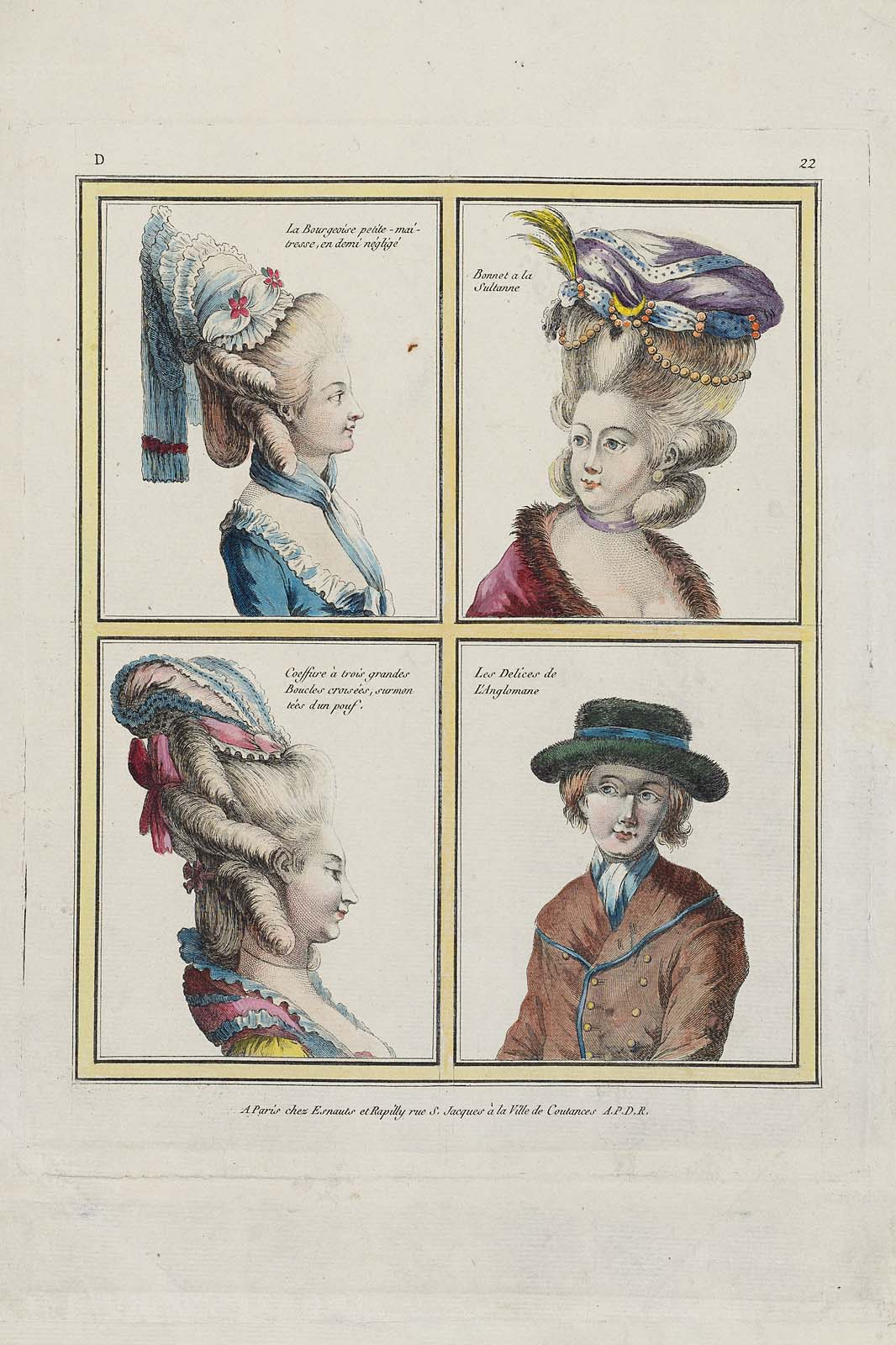
Illustrations from Gallery of French Fashions and Costumes (1778)

The pouf was a very elaborate and time-consuming hairstyle; hours were needed to create it. To create the base, a very thin metal frame was used to structure the shape. Also a triangular pillow (pouf, toque) was used as support. The frame was then padded and intertwined with pomaded false hair 'postiches', and one's own hair would be taken in. The pomaded hair would then be curled in various sections (varying on the specific style), with heated clay curlers lined with strips of thin paper. The lovelocks would be curled in a similar fashion. Once the shaping and styling was done, it would be finished off with white or grey powder, and decoration proceeded.

In the mid- to late-1770s, huge hair became all the rage. This high hairstyle was created using toques (or “cushions”) which were made of fabric or cork and shaped like a heart or spear. It was attached to the top of the head, and then natural and false hair was curled, waved, or frizzed and piled over and around the cushion.

"At that time [1780] everybody wore powder and pomatum; a large triangular thing called a cushion, to which the hair was frizzed up with three or four enormous curls on each side; the higher the pyramid of hair, gauze, feathers, and other ornaments was carried the more fashionable it was thought, and such was the labour employed to rear the fabric that night-caps were made in proportion to it and covered over the hair, immensely long black pins, double and single, powder, pomatum and all ready for the next day. I think I remember hearing that twenty-four large pins were by no means an unusual number to go to bed with on your head"

A high hairstyle was not necessarily time-consuming or too labour-intensive. The following styling without decorations takes only 15 minutes, and a hairdo of some 30 cm (one foot) in height is achieved. "18th century women did not scrub their hair clean, so much as cleanse it. Instead of daily lathering of soap and water, they worked pomatum into the hair with their fingers, added powder, and then brushed and combed vigorously. More powder was dusted on before styling to achieve the fashionable matte, "dusty" look of powder and to make dark hair paler.

Women did not tease their hair, but added extra volume with padded forms called rollers (thick, sausage-shaped pillow) and cushions. Sewn of wool cloth to match the wearer's hair, these were shaped pillows stuffed lightly with down or sheep's wool. The hair was wrapped around, or pulled through the forms, and smoothed and pinned into the desired shape. Side curls could be rolled and pinned into place, and extra touches could include braids or false curls."

== Height ==
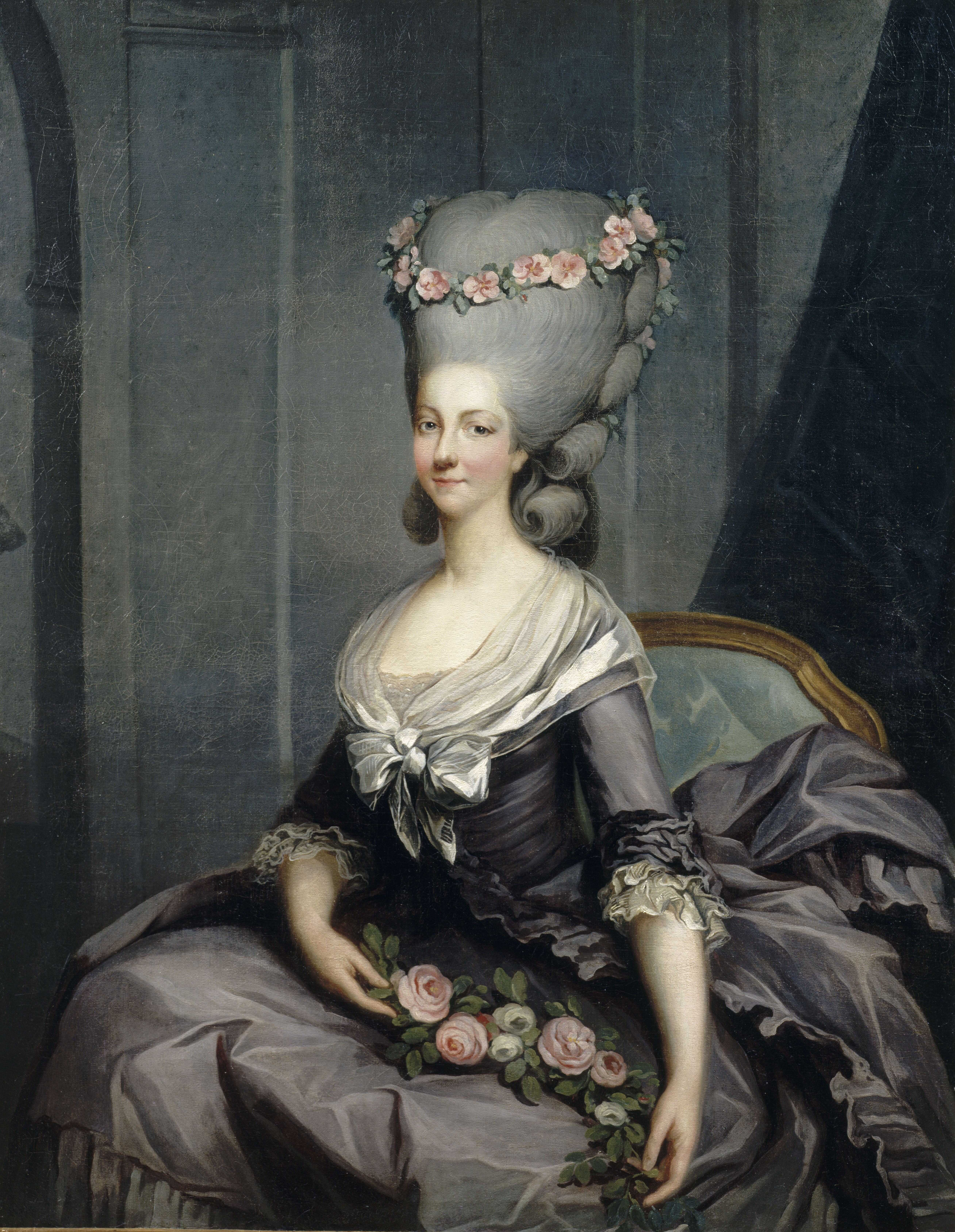
Marie Thérèse Louise of Savoy, Princesse de Lamballe (c. 1776)

The height varied, generally from very subtle one foot (30 cm) to as much as two feet (60 cm). The height of these styles was generally about 1 to 1 1/2 times the length of the face, and was styled in what was considered a pyramid shape (it also looks very much like a hot air balloon).

In 1775, Empress Maria Theresa of Austria wrote to her daughter Queen Marie Antoinette:

"Likewise I cannot help but touch upon a point that many of the papers repeat to me too often: it is the hairstyle that you wear. They say that from the roots it measures 36 pouces high (36 inches or 91.44 cm) and with all the feathers and ribbons that hold all of that up! You know that I have always been of the opinion that one should follow fashion moderately, but never carry it to excess. A pretty young queen full of charms has no need of all these follies. Quite the contrary. A simple hairstyle suits her better and is more appropriate for a queen. She must set the tone, and everyone will hurry to follow even your smallest errors..."

In 1776 Marie Antoinette had a hairstyle so high, that the plumes had to be removed from the coiffure, to get her in the carriage. The hairstyles of the day "reached such a height that it was necessary for ladies to kneel on the carriage floor—or hold the towering hairpieces outside the coach windows en route to balls and the opera."

== Care ==
The hairstyle would remain in the wearer's hair for about a week or two, until it was no longer hygienic (due to the pomade) or it could no longer keep its shape, and it was then simply washed and redone. Coated with animal fat and a powder mixed from wheat flour, the hair would become rancid and would often attract vermin – ostensibly the origin of the term "her hair is a rat's nest".

The best and most expensive fat for pomade was pork lard, due to its mild odour. A recipe for a pomatum from The Toilet of Flora (1779) consisted of mutton fat and pig's lard with essence of lemon and clove oil, to be kept in a jar. Clove oil acts as natural flea and tick repellent.

When sleeping, women would add two or three pillows to keep their head upright and protect the hair. Great care was taken to duck when entering doorways and carriages, for the same reason. Women had to bend double to ride in their coaches, due to the immense height of the hair-dress.

Women at court found it hard to keep up with the ever-changing fashion of hair. In order to keep these hairstyles from ruin, women would wear 'calash', a type of large carriage wheel-like bonnet, structured with boning, that accordioned open, which protected it from wind, dirt and rain.

== Cost ==
Wealthier women may have had their hair done more often due to the cost of the technique and materials; Marie Antoinette at one time was said to have a different hairstyle every day, designed by her dressmaker Rose Bertin and her favourite coiffeur Léonard Autié. Countess Goyon de Matignon, known as Madame de Matignon, gave hairdresser Le sieur Beaulard 24,000 livres a year for styling her hair in a different way every day of the year. The Duchess de Chartres ordered one batch of plumes from Genoa at a price of 50,000 livres. A chignon wig made for the opera singer Antoinette Saint-Huberty (Saint-Huberti) cost 232 livres. In 1781 a wedding coiffure cost 48 livres, a hairstyle for the day after the wedding 24 livres, and a hairstyle for the following days 6 livres.

== See also ==
- Fontange - a tall headdress/hairstyle in fashion before poufs
- Beehive (hairstyle) - A 20th century hairstyle of similar height, but created by teasing the hair
- List of hairstyles
- Media related to Poufs at Wikimedia Commons
