= Jean-François Autié =

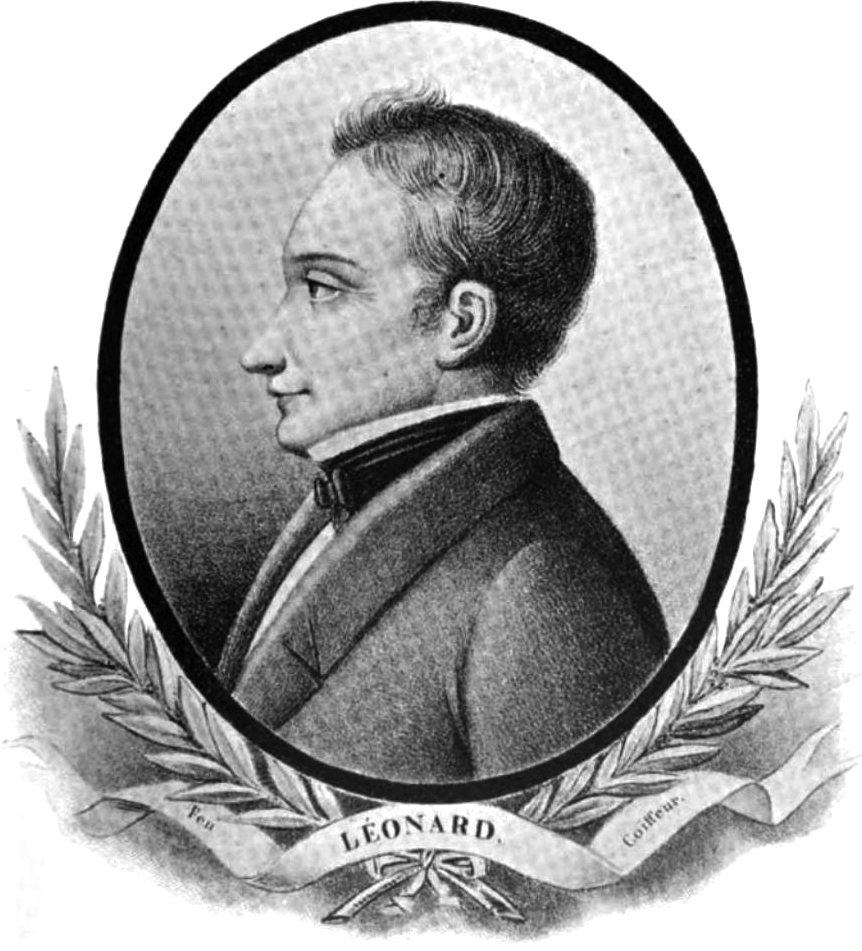
Jean-François Autié, dit Léonard

Jean-François Autié (1758 – 25 July 1794) was a hairdresser to Queen Marie Antoinette. He was the youngest brother of Léonard-Alexis Autié and Pierre Autié (1753 – 1814), who were also hairdressers at the royal court. All three brothers used the professional name of Monsieur Léonard.

== Early life ==
Born in the medieval town of Pamiers in southwestern France, he was the son of Alexis Autié and Catherine Fournier, who were domestic servants.

== Career as a hairdresser ==
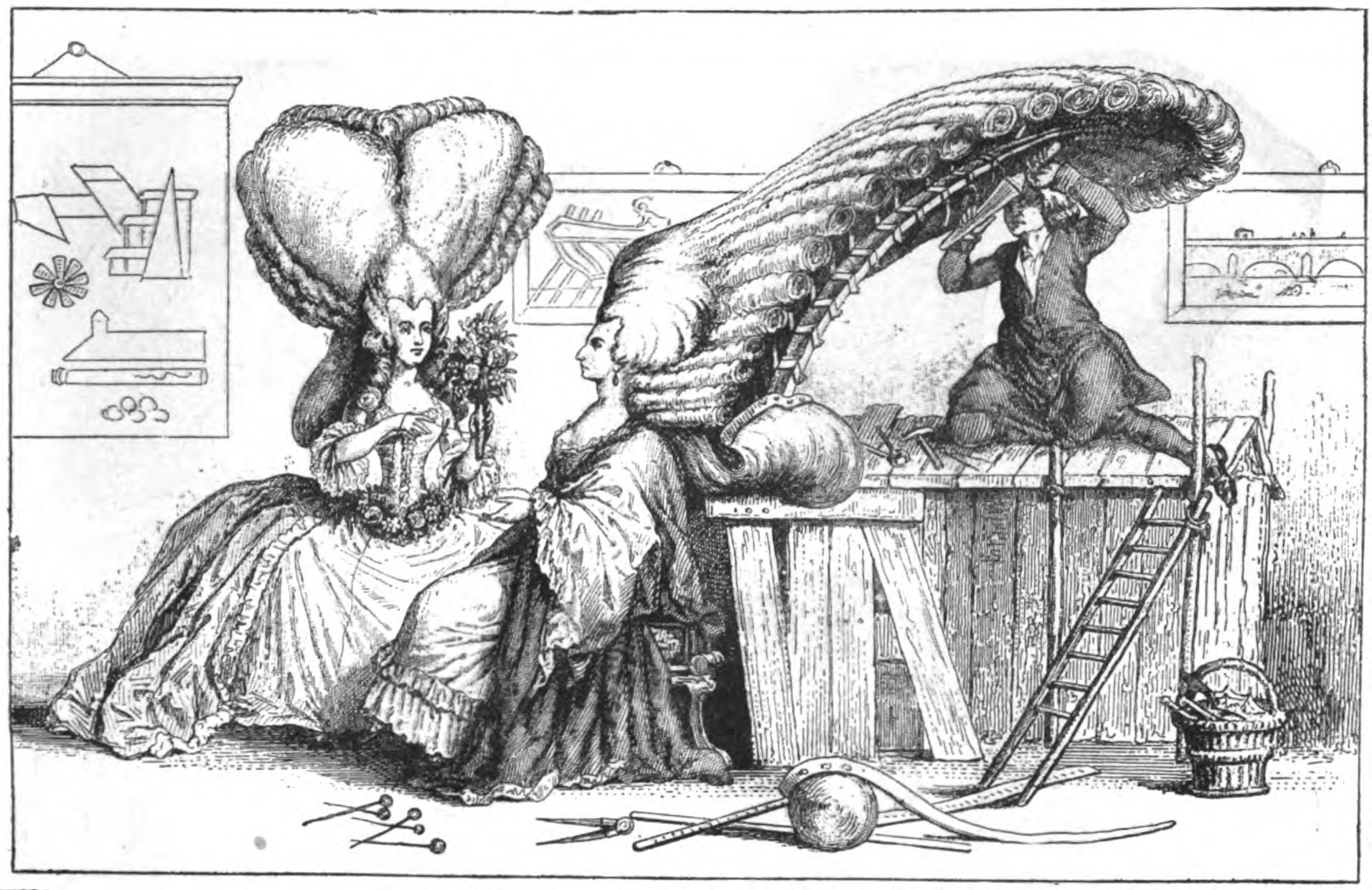
Académie de coiffure on the rue de la Chaussée-d'Antin, 1788

Léonard-Alexis Autié, the oldest of the brothers, was the first to go to Paris, where he became the favorite hairdresser of Marie Antoinette and was called Monsieur Léonard. Léonard-Alexis later arranged for Jean-François and Pierre to join him in Paris, and they became partners in a hair-dressing studio and school, known as the Académie de coiffure, which was eventually situated in the rue de la Chaussée-d'Antin. Taking advantage of their oldest brother's fame, Jean-François and Pierre also adopted the professional name of Monsieur Léonard. The Académie de coiffure in effect became the House of Léonard.

Jean-François and their cousin Villanou (Jean-Pierre Autié, born 4 April 1762) also worked as hairdressers in the household of Marie Antoinette, while Pierre worked for the king's sister, Madame Elizabeth. In 1783, Jean-François purchased the legacy (survivance) of Jean-Remy Le Guay, Marie Antoinette's official valet de chambre and perruquier-baigneur-étuviste. In 1788, upon Le Guay's death, Jean-François became the sole possessor of Le Guay's position. Léonard-Alexis, who was no longer active as a hairdresser, kept the honorary title of Coiffeur de la reine.

== The flight to Varennes ==
In June 1791, Jean-François Autié (often referred to as Monsieur Léonard, hairdresser to the queen, and sometimes confused with Léonard-Alexis) accompanied the Duc de Choiseul during the royal family's flight to Varennes.

== Death ==
Jean-François Autié probably died in Paris under the guillotine on 7 thermidor an II (25 July 1794), although this has been disputed. Will Bashor suggests that with assistance he may have arranged for another nameless prisoner to take his place at the guillotine and fled France for America.

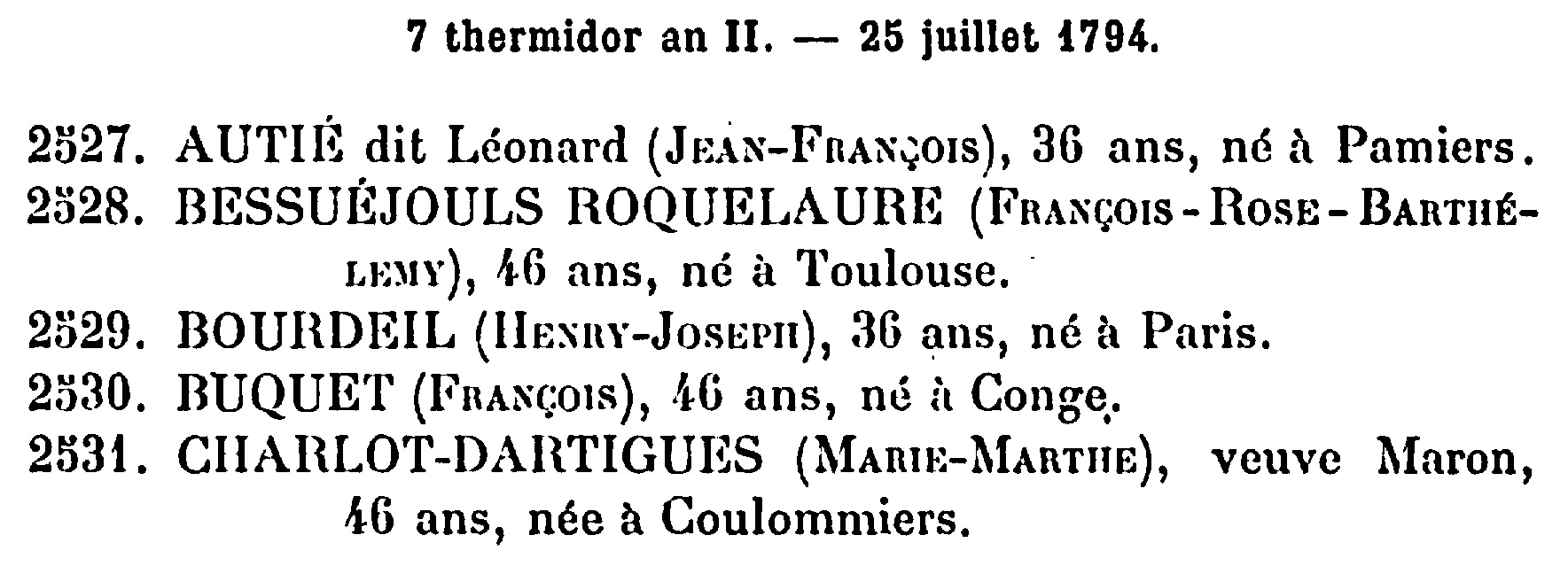
Detail from the list of victims of the Revolutionary Tribunal of Paris on 25 July 1794
