= Will Bashor =

American historian

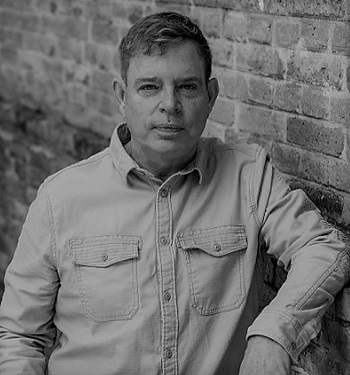
Will Bashor, Sitges, Spain

Will Bashor (born Harold Willis Bashor, Jr.; 6 February 1951) is an American author of French history and international law.

== Background and education ==
Bashor received his doctorate in International Relations from the American Graduate School in Paris (2004). He teaches at Franklin University located in Columbus, Ohio. His interests have ranged over many fields, among them the study of international law and business, linguistics, cultural anthropology, and European history. He received his M.A. in French Literature from Ohio University and is an active member of the Society for French Historical Studies.

== Awards ==
Marie Antoinette's Head: The Royal Hairdresser, the Queen, and the Revolution was awarded the Adèle Mellen Prize for Distinguished Scholarship. This narrative of the life of Léonard Autié was also a top finalist for the 2013 USA Best Book Awards. In addition to the awards, Marie Antoinette's Head was featured in the 2013 Fall Vogue UK fashion issue as well as receiving the Kirkus Star Award.

== Non-Fiction ==
- Marie Antoinette's World: Intrigue, Infidelity, and Adultery in Versailles (Rowman & Littlefield, 2020; ISBN 978-1538138243)
- Marie Antoinette's Darkest Days: Prisoner No. 280 in the Conciergerie (Rowman & Littlefield, 2016; ISBN 978-1442254992)
- Marie Antoinette's Head: The Royal Hairdresser, the Queen, and the Revolution (Lyons Press, 2013; ISBN 978-0762791538)
- Jean-Baptiste Cléry: Louis XVI and Marie Antoinette's Nightmare (Diderot Press, 2011; ASIN B006QQ23SY)
- The Moon Treaty Paradox (Xlibris, 2005; ISBN 978-1413479621)
