= Madame Eloffe =

French fashion merchant (1759–1805)

Adélaïde Henriette Damoville (Madame Eloffe; 1759–1805) was a French fashion merchant. She was a favorite milliner of Queen Marie Antoinette.

She was the niece of Mme Pompey and succeeded her in the privilege of selling the trimmings and accessories to the women of the royal court. She provided dresses for the ladies-in-waiting in the court of Versailles, and Marie Antoinette was a regular customer. Eloffe was described as a successful rival to Rose Bertin. She was known to advertise her business to the queen by having a portrait of her in the window of her shop. Her accounts books testify that it was common for noblewomen to order remakes of dresses rather than to order completely new ones, but that the remakes were often more expensive than new ones. The queen often ordered remakes and redecorations of old dresses from her. In 1785, the queen owed Eloffe a sum of 25.000 livres, in comparison to the 90.000 livres she owed Rose Bertin. After the outbreak of the French Revolution, Eloffe no longer sent her bills monthly to her clients, but charged them directly for each item.

Madame Eloffe was one of the four top fashion merchants alongside Rose Bertin, Le Sieur Beaulard and Mademoiselle Alexandre during the reign of Louis XVI. Her account books, unlike those of Rose Bertin, have been preserved and are considered to be valuable historical sources, particularly in regard to the wardrobe of Marie Antoinette. Her business with Marie Antoinette was published in the work by Gustave-Armand-Henry, Comte de Reiset, Modes et usages au temps de Marie Antoinette: Livre-journal de Madame Eloffe, 2. vols. (Paris, 1885).
