= Madame Raimbaud =

Madame Raimbaud or Mme Raimbaut was a French fashion dressmaker. She was a successful fashion creator during the Directoire (1795–1799) and the French Consulate (1799–1804). She was one of the dressmakers of empress Josephine de Beauharnais, and referred to as "the Michelangelo of fashion".

== Life and career ==
Mme Raimbaud was actve as a dressmaker, couturiere in Paris. She achieved great success during the Directoire.

After the end of Robespierre's Reign of Terror in 1794, there was a great interest in pleasure and luxury in the upper class of Paris. There was a fashion revolution represented by the Incroyables et Merveilleuse, inspired by the cultures of antiquity.

In 1799, when women's fashion was inspired by antique fashion, Madame Raimbaud was considered the foremost dressmaker for those who preferred the Ancient Roman style, while Mademoiselle Nancy was the dressmaker of those who preferred to Ancient Greek style. Both Raimbaud and Nancy were said to design their fashion while studying the draping of Ancient Roman and Greek statues.

She came to be one of the dressmakers of empress Josephine de Beauharnais. Between 1800 and 1805, she was the business partner of the famous fashion merchant Louis Hippolyte Leroy. She was the designer in the business, since Leroy was foremost the business manager and merchant, while she did the design.
