= Maîtresses marchandes lingères =

Maîtresses marchandes lingères was a French guild organisation for women linen draper seamstresses and hemp merchants within the city of Paris, active from the Middle Ages until 1791. It was one of only three guilds open to women in Paris prior to 1776, the other two being the Maitresses bouquetieres and the Maîtresses couturières.

== History ==
The guild was formed in the 13th- or 14th-century, and was one of the strongest guilds in Paris until the French Revolution of 1789, both in money and status. The linen seamstresses sold lace and all manner of clothing made of linen and Cannabis sativa. They manufactured all sorts of products made of linen, on and off commission. In accordance with the privileges of the guild, a linen seamstress did not become a minor under the guardianship of her husband when she married, which was an exception from contemporary law of married women's minority.

The guild was somewhat unusual: though the profession of seamstress was very common and socially accepted for a woman, it was normally practiced outside of the guilds in Europe prior to the 19th-century, and discriminated by the tailor's guilds. Paris was rare in having an actual guild for seamstresses, and it was further increased with the Maîtresses couturières of 1675 and the Marchandes de modes of 1776.
