= Marie-Françoise Corot =

French fashion designer

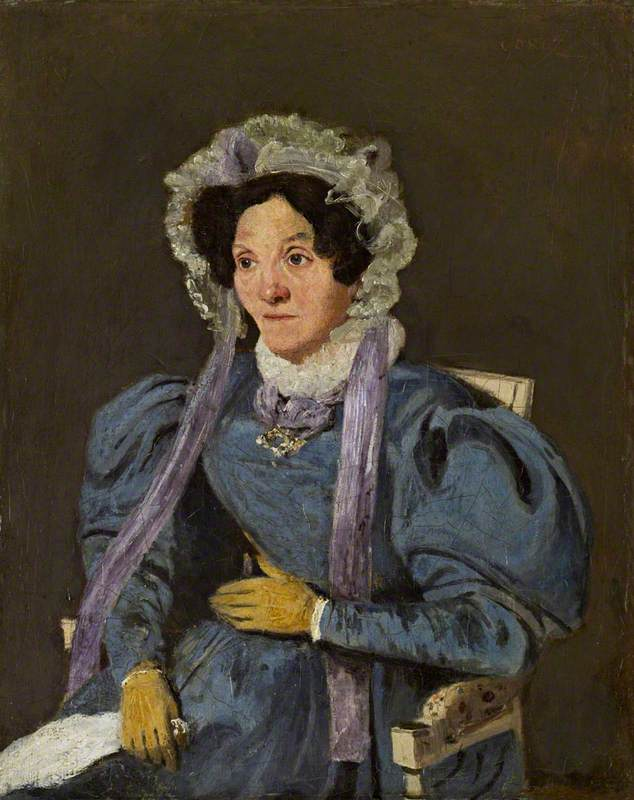
Marie-Françoise Corot

Marie-Françoise Corot (1768–1851) was a French fashion designer (milliner), known as one of the most fashionable of her trade in the first decades of the 19th-century.

She was the daughter of a Swiss merchant, married the French wig maker Louis-Jacques Corot (1771–1847) in 1793 and became the mother of the artist Camille Corot.

She had been the student of a milliner before her marriage, and after her marriage she opened her own milliner business. She was successful enough that in 1798, her spouse discontinued his own business just to handle the economy of her business. During the First Empire, she was a fashionable milliner in Paris and second only to the famous Madame Herbault, the milliner of empress Josephine, who was described as her main rival and competitor. Her fame and success continued during the entire Bourbon Restoration in France.
