= Madame Prévost =

Madame Prévost (French: [madam pʁevo]; fl. 1830) was a French florist. She has been named as the first flower seller to open a flower shop in Paris, where the flower trade had previously only been sold by street vendors. She is said to have developed the first modern flower bouquet and played an important part in the history of modern floristry, which was developed in Europe in this time period.

== Life and career ==
Madame Prévost opened her own flower shop at the Palais-Royal in Paris in 1830. Historically the flower trade in Paris had been managed by the Maîtresses bouquetières (1677-1791), a guild of flower sellers, who had sold their flowers as street vendors. The guild was abolished during the French Revolution, but flowers were only sold by street vendors until the flower sellers were allowed to open flower shops in 1828-29.

Madame Prévost was thus a pioneer, and her shop has been referred to as the first flower shop in Paris by Jules Janin in Les Catacombes.

This was a period of rapid expansion and development of the florist profession in Europe. Artfully arranged flowers had become a fashionable art form as well as popular during private dinners; at the same time, and the abolition of the guild system had made flower sellers all over Europe had started to transfer their business from street vending to flower shop, making flowers easier to keep and arrange.

Madame Prévost has been described as the first florist in the modern sense. She is said to have designed the first modern flower bouquet, artistically designed to suit the occasion and the personal taste of the client; she was known for the combination of fragrance and color of her arrangements and the exclusivity of her customer service, since she only allowed one client at the time to be in her shop. She also created and sold flower wreath.

Madame Prévost was a pioneer in the history of modern floristry. Ten years after she opened her own shop, Jules Lachaume opened the Lachaume at the Rue de la Chaussée d'Antin, which has been referred to as the first big florist house in France, and in 1880 the Société Nationale d'Horticulture de France (SNHF) was founded.

== See also ==
- Madame Bernard
