= Maîtresses couturières =

Maîtresses couturières was a French guild organisation for seamstresses within the city of Paris, active from 30 March 1675 until 1791. It was one of only three guilds open to women in Paris prior to 1776, the other two being the Maitresses bouquetieres and the Maîtresses marchandes lingères.

They had permission to manufacture clothes for women and children, with the exception of the most expensive court dress for women. This placed them in competition with the tailors' guild, who had permission to manufacture clothes for both men and women.

The guild was somewhat unusual: though the occupation of seamstress was very common and socially accepted for a woman, it was normally practiced outside of the guilds in Europe prior to the 19th century, and discriminated against by the tailors' guilds. Paris was rare in having an actual guild for seamstresses, and it was further increased with the Marchandes de modes of 1776.

== Sources ==
- Crowston, Clare Haru (2001). Fabricating Women: The Seamstresses of Old Regime France, 1675–1791. Duke University Press. ISBN 0822383063.
- Simonton, Deborah (2014). Simonton, Deborah; Kaartinen, Marjo; Montenach, Anne (eds.). Luxury and Gender in European Towns, 1700-1914. Routledge. ISBN 9781317611363.
