= Marie Madeleine Duchapt =

French fashion merchant

Marie Madeleine Duchapt, also known as only La Duchapt (d. after 1761), was a celebrated French fashion merchant. Active from the 1730s to 1760s, she succeeded Françoise Leclerc as the leading marchande de modes in Paris. She has been referred to as the first famous fashion celebrity of the Parisian fashion business, and was a predecessor of Rose Bertin.

== Biography ==
Marie Madeleine Duchapt has been referred to as Madame Duchapt, Mademoiselle Duchapt and finally, when she was most famous, as only 'La Duchapt'. She was reportedly married to the mercer Martin Arnaud Loysant; at that time, it was common for fashion merchants to be the wives of textile mercers. In her epoch, however, it was not unusual for married women to be called "Mademoiselle", as the title "Madame" denoted prestige.

=== Career ===
She was the manager of the famous Paris fashion accessories shop Chande de modes, and came to the fore in 1734, when she began receiving orders from women of the nobility. At this time, Françoise Leclerc, the official dressmaker of the queen, was in failing health and Duchapt supplanted Leclerc in that role.

During the period 1740–1770, dresses were produced by seamstresses or tailors. The basic dress model remained the same, but fashion was expressed by changes in trimming, hats and accessories, which was why fashion merchants such as Duchapt had such influence. While the guild of fashion merchants, Marchandes de modes, was not created before 1776, the profession had existed for a least half a century, and became reality after the success of merchants such as Duchapt.

She had clients among both the Parisian aristocracy as well as the ladies-in-waiting of the Court of Versailles. Charles Philippe d'Albert de Luynes noted that she traveled to Spain in 1739 with her client, the king's mistress Louise Julie de Mailly, in order to study how to dress Mailly for the up-coming French-Spanish Royal wedding.

She is still mentioned as being celebrated in 1756, and is noted in the records as active in 1761. She was the rival of Mademoiselle Alexandre, who had succeeded her as the leading fashion merchant of Paris by 1772, when Duchapt is referred to as a "former celebrity".

== Legacy ==
Marie Madeleine Duchapt is mentioned in contemporary letters, memoirs and novels.

Voltaire referred to her fame in a 1752 letter to Madame du Deffand as an illustration of the shallowness of the epoch of Louis XV in contrast to that of Louis XIV.

Jean-Jacques Rousseau mentions her atelier in his memoirs as a popular place for those wishing to get to know Paris, and noted that many men visited her shop to speak to her shop girls.

She was portrayed in a contemporary novel, La Sainte Nitouche, ou Histoire galante de la Tourière des Carmélites, suivie de l'histoire de La Duchapt, célèbre marchand de mode (London, 1748; rev. ed. Paris, 1830)
