= Jean Joseph Beaulard =

French fashion merchant and designer

- Died: after 1775
- Other name: Le Sieur Beaulard
- Occupations: fashion merchant, fashion designer
- Known for: inventions within hats and headdresses

Jean Joseph Beaulard, known as Le Sieur Beaulard (died after 1775), was a French fashion merchant and fashion designer.

He was one of the four top fashion merchants alongside Rose Bertin, Madame Eloffe and Mademoiselle Alexandre during the reign of Louis XVI, and is described as the rival and predecessor of Rose Bertin as the leading fashion designer in France. He was particularly known for his inventions within hats and headdresses. He had clients within the royal court and aristocracy, and was internationally famous at the time. His most known clients were queen Marie Antoinette and Louis XV's mistress, Madame du Barry.

He was the hairdresser of the fashion icon Madame de Matignon, who gave him 24 000 livres (e.g. pounds in silver) a year for styling her hair in a different way every day of the year. The value corresponds in 2014 euros some 1,2 million €.

Considering the enormous amount of money paid, it is not known whether this applied for styling her own hair or her wigs or both. Also it is not known how many employees Beaulard had in his shop. It is known that besides Rose Bertin, Le sieur Beaulard was among the following three top fashion merchants alongside Madame Eloffe and Mademoiselle Alexandre in the 1770s. Beaulard was praised as "a modiste without parallel, the creator and the poet ... because of his myriad inventions and delicious names for fripperies". As the coiffures got very high during the 1770s, Beaulard invented the coiffure à la grand-mére, a mechanical coiffure which could be lowered as much as one foot (30 cm) by touching a spring.

== See also ==
- Léonard Autié
- Marie Madeleine Duchapt
