= Madame Bernard =

Madame Bernard was a French florist and flower merchant. She was the official royal purveyor to Emperor Napoleon and the empresses Josephine and Marie Louise. She was a rare early example of a celebrity florist of unusual success.

== Life and career ==
Madame Bernard was active as a flower seller in Paris. The guild of he flower sellers, the famous Maîtresses bouquetières, was abolished during the French revolution in 1791, and the flower sellers still made their living by sellng flowers from baskets on the street.

Madame Bernard however came to be well known and achieved uncommon success in a professon were most of her colleagues lived in poverty. She was a well known businesswoman during the 1790s, and by the year 1800, she was described as la fameuse bouquetière de l’Opéra ("The famous flower seller by the opera"), likely describing her place of business as the opera in Paris. Laure Junot notes in her memoirs that her husband bought a boquet from Bernard when he courted her prior to their children in 1800.

In the Les fournisseurs de Napoléon Ier et des deux impératrices, she is titled ”la bouquetière de l’Impératrice” (florist of the empress), and recollect that her boquets had given her a circle of clients in the elegant society of Paris. She was the bouquetière en titre (Official flower purveyor) to Emperor Napoleon, Empress Josephine and Empress Marie Louise. In 1807 she is listed as the flower purveyor of the private cabinet of Napoleon. She delivered flowers to all of the imperial residences. After Napoleon married Marie Louise in 1810, she delivered flowers to the private rooms of the empress every day, since Marie Louise always wanted fresh flowers in her room.

== See also ==
- Madame Prévost
