= Maîtresses bouquetières =

1677–1791 Parisian flower sellers' guild

The Communauté des maîtresses bouquetières et marchandes chapelières en fleurs (Community of mistress flower sellers and merchants of floral garlands) was a French Guild organisation for female fresh flower sellers within the city of Paris, active from August 1677 until 1791.

== History ==
Flower seller was a common profession for women in Paris long before the guild was formed. It was a common professions for female relatives to male flower sellers and gardeners, and girls became aprentices for adult flower sellers.

Flower sellers became such a common profession in Paris that in the 1670s, the city authorities saw a need fo establish a guld for them. It was formatted in 1675, when Colbert issued a decree forcing the establishment of guilds in Paris, and was given its formal patent in August 1677.

The profession of flower seller was a common profession for women in Paris. They had the monopoly of selling flowers for all purposes in the capital of Paris. Every flower seller had to spend at least four years as an apprentice of another flower seller before she could legally work in the profession. She was banned from hiring men in her enterprise. A report stated that the majority of those active in the profession where women of low economic circumstances and few became financially successful, merely making enough money to support themselves.

It was one of only three guilds open to women in 17th-century Paris, the other two being the Maîtresses marchandes lingères and the Maîtresses couturières.

== See also ==
- Madame Prévost
- Madame Bernard
