= Rose Bertin =

French fashion merchant (1747 - 1813)

Marie-Jeanne Bertin
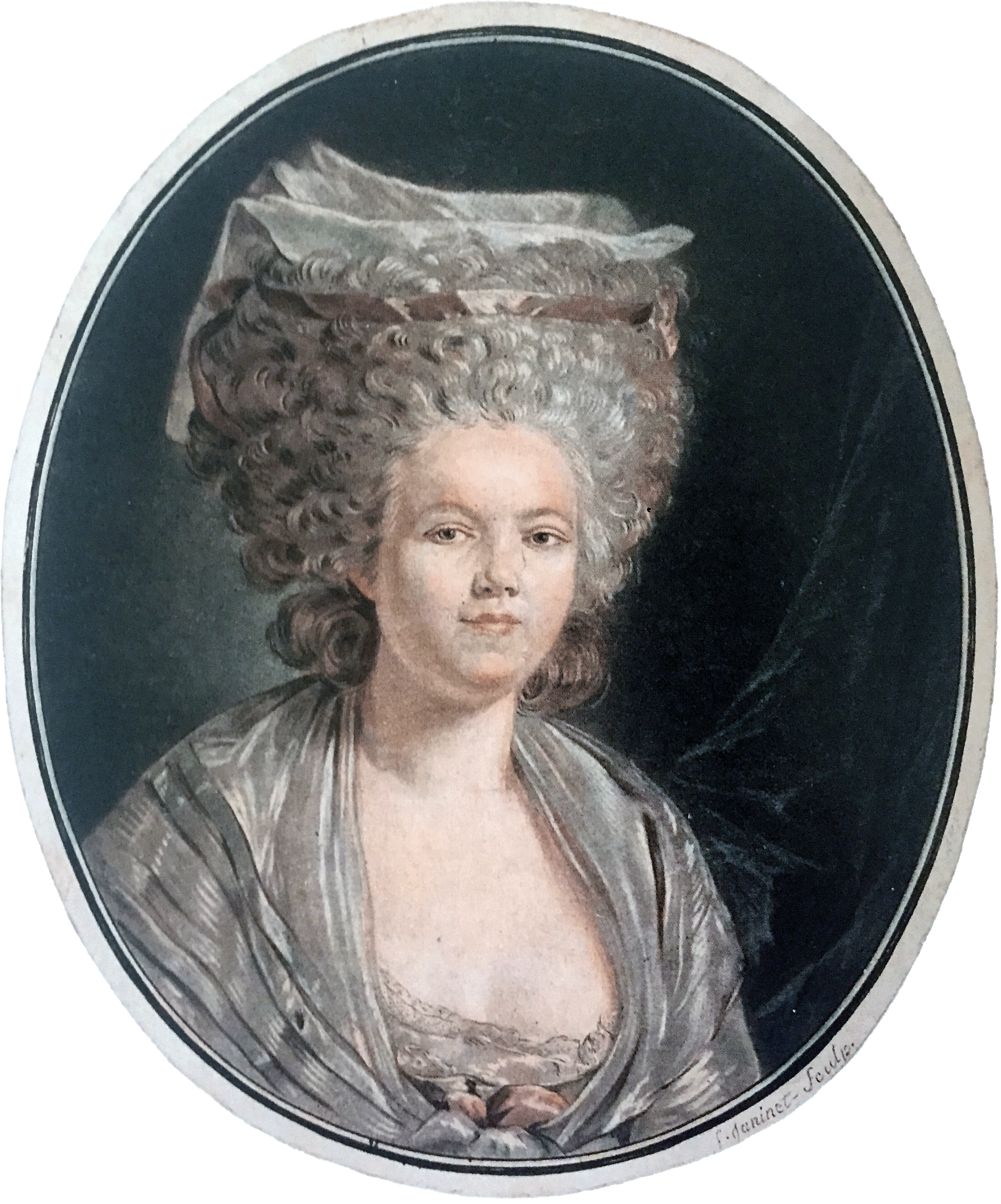
- Born: 2 July 1747; Abbeville
- Died: 22 September 1813 (aged 66); Épinay-sur-Seine
- Other name: Rose Bertin
- Occupation: Fashion merchant

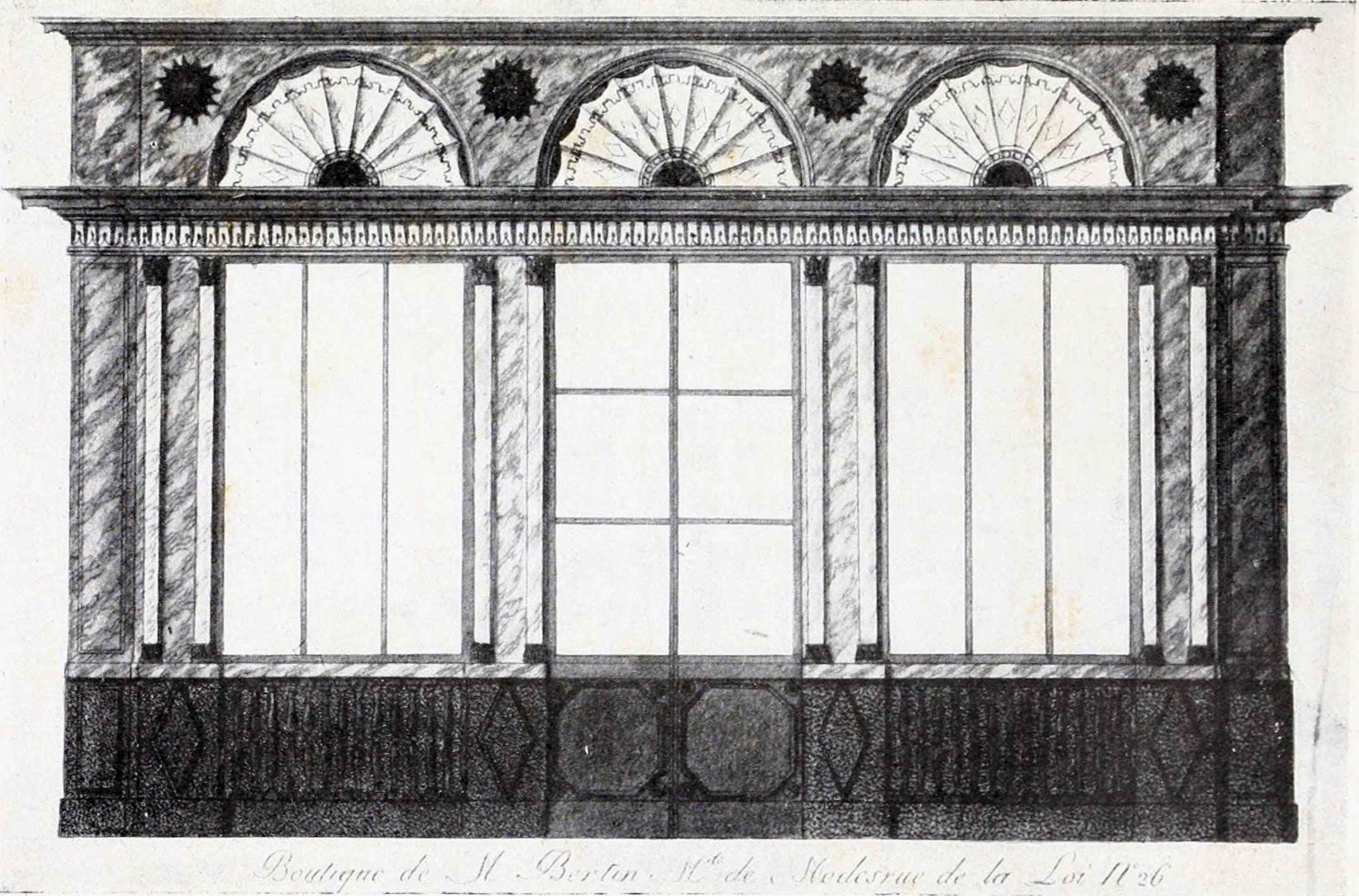
Bertin's shop front at 26 rue de Richelieu, c.1805

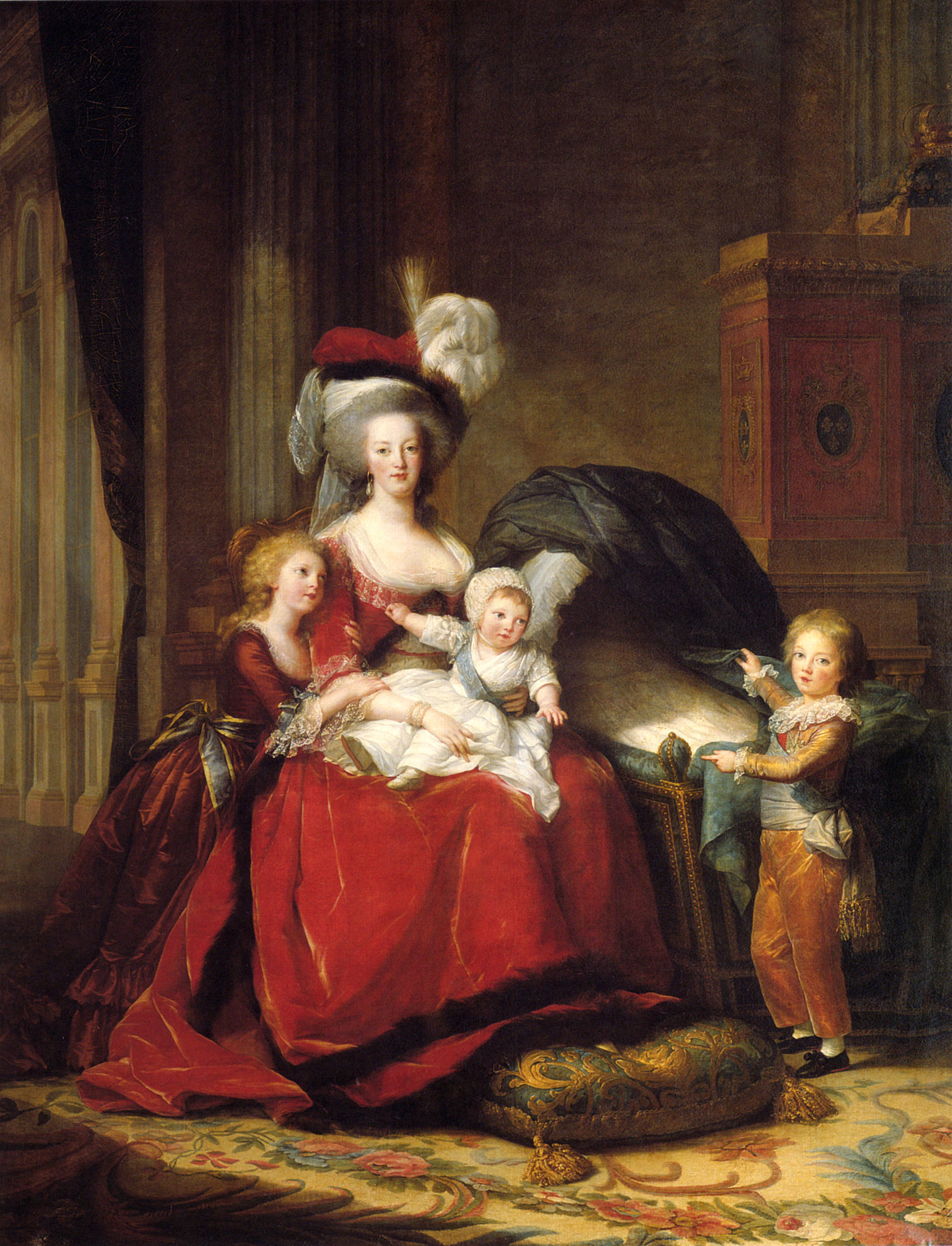
Marie Antoinette de Lorraine-Habsbourg and Her Children by Élisabeth-Louise Vigée-Le Brun (1787) Versailles, Musée national du Château et des Trianons The Queen is shown in an up-to-date outfit created by Bertin.

Marie-Jeanne "Rose" Bertin (2 July 1747, Abbeville, Picardy, France – 22 September 1813, Épinay-sur-Seine) was a French fashion merchant and businesswoman. She was particularly noted for her work with Queen Marie Antoinette. Bertin was the first celebrated French fashion designer and is widely credited with having brought fashion and haute couture to the forefront of popular culture.

== Biography ==
Marie-Jeanne Bertin was the daughter of Nicolas Bertin (d. 1754) and Marie-Marguerite Méquignon, and spent her childhood in St Gilles in Picardie. She was the sixth of seven children born to the couple. Bertin's family was of small means; her mother worked as a nurse, which at the time was a profession with very low salary and status, and the financial situation became even worse after the death of her father, who had worked in the local constabulary.

=== Early career ===
Bertin's home town of Abbeville had a tradition of textile manufacture, reaching back to 1665 when Louis XIV's finance minister Jean-Baptiste Colbert established a manufacture of fine cloth in the Spanish and Dutch style in the area. Bertin probably acquired knowledge of textiles from a young age. When she was nine years old, Bertin was apprenticed to a fashion merchant in Abbeville, Victoire Barbier, who appears to have been a distant aunt.

In the mid-1760s Bertin moved to Paris, where she became apprenticed to a successful fashion merchant, Mademoiselle Pagelle, with clients among the aristocracy. Bertin's early success can be attributed to her good relations with the Princesse de Conti, the Duchesse de Chartres and the Princesse de Lamballe, who would one day arrange her meeting with Marie Antoinette.

In 1770, Bertin opened her own shop, Le Grand Mogol, on the Rue Saint-Honoré with the support of the Duchesse de Chartres (it moved to 26 Rue de Richelieu in 1789). She quickly found customers among influential noble ladies at Versailles, many of whom followed her from Mademoiselle Pagelle's, including many ladies-in-waiting to the new Dauphine, Marie Antoinette.

=== Fashion merchant to Marie Antoinette ===
Before Marie Antoinette arrived in France from Austria, she had been schooled in the nuances of galant spoken French and French fashions. She was introduced to Bertin in the summer of 1774. Marie Antoinette commissioned Bertin to make her robes for the Coronation of Louis XVI, which were reportedly so heavy that they had to be carried to Rheims from Paris on a stretcher.

Marie Antoinette was so enamoured of her fashion merchant that she abolished the historic custom of dressing in public in a formal levée ceremony, choosing instead to be dressed in private by Bertin. Twice a week, Bertin would present her newest creations to the queen and spend hours discussing them. The queen adored her wardrobe and was passionate about every detail, and Bertin, as her milliner, became her confidante and friend. Her position as the designer to the queen also secured her role as the leading fashion designer of the French aristocracy and, as French fashion was the leader in Europe, the central figure of European fashion.

Called "Minister of Fashion" by her detractors, Bertin designed almost every new dress commissioned by the queen. Bertin clothed the queen from 1770 until her deposition in 1792. Bertin became a powerful figure at court, and she witnessed—and sometimes effected—profound changes in French society. Her large, ostentatious gowns ensured that their wearer occupied at least three times as much space as their male counterpart, thus making the woman a more imposing presence. Her creations also established France as the center of the fashion industry, and from then on, dresses made in Paris were sent to London, Venice, Vienna, Saint Petersburg and Constantinople. The influence of Bertin's works are said to have established the worldwide reputation of French couture.

In the mid-18th century, French women had begun to "pouf" (raise) their hair with pads and pomade and wore oversized luxurious gowns. Bertin used and exaggerated the leading modes of the day, and created poufs for Marie Antoinette with heights up to three feet. The pouf fashion reached such extremes that it became a period trademark, along with decorating the hair with ornaments and objects which showcased current events. Working with Léonard Autié, the queen's hairdresser, Bertin created a coiffure that became the rage all over Europe: hair would be accessorized, stylized, cut into defining scenes, and modeled into shapes and objects—ranging from recent gossip to nativities to husbands' infidelities, to French naval vessels such as the Belle Poule, to the pouf aux insurgents in honour of the American Revolutionary War. The queen's most famous coif was the "inoculation" pouf that she wore to publicize her success in persuading the king to be vaccinated against smallpox.

Clothing had long served in France as one of the most visible markers of social privilege and aristocratic status. Antoinette was known for wearing many of the new ground breaking fashions. Bertin came up with the idea of the chemise à la Reine or robe “en Gaulle”, a more free-flowing gown, which was initially created for Marie-Antoinette and was one of her favorite silhouettes. The dress sparked a mini-revolution and became very popular from 1781 onwards. It was a gown made to be worn in private spaces and made of white cotton, gauze, or silk. It was straight, very low cut and it was fastened with a belt around the waist, lightly accentuating the female figure. Antoinette and Bertin popularized English-inspired, sporty fashion, inspired by equestrian fashion. All the dresses were made of expensive fabrics such as silk, velvet, and very rarely cotton. It took hard work and dedication to create such masterpieces.

Marie Antoinette also asked Bertin to dress dolls in the latest fashions as gifts for her sisters and her mother, the Empress Maria Theresa of Austria. Bertin's fashion dolls were called "Pandores," and were made of wax over jointed wood armatures or porcelain. There were small ones the size of a common toy doll, or large ones as big or half as big as a real person, petites Pandores and grandes Pandores. Fashion dolls as couriers of modes remained in vogue until the appearance of Fashion magazines.

With the queen's patronage, Bertin's name became synonymous with the sartorial elegance and excess of Versailles. Bertin's close relationship with the queen provided valuable background into the social and political significance of fashion at the French court. The frequent meetings between the queen and her couturière were met, however, with hostility from the poorer classes, given Bertin's high prices: her gowns and headdresses could easily cost twenty times what a skilled worker of the time earned in a year.

During Marie Antoinette's imprisonment, Bertin continued to receive orders from her former prized customer, for much smaller, almost negligible ribbons and simple alterations. She was to provide the former queen's mourning outfit following the execution of Louis XVI, recalling a dream that Marie Antoinette had had years before of her favorite milliner handing her ribbons that all turned to black.

=== French Revolution ===
The French Revolution did not immediately diminish her business despite the emigration of many of her clients abroad, and she continued to be in favour of the queen, though the bills were significantly lower.

According to Léonard Autié, he, Bertin and Henriette Campan collectively contributed to the secret negotiations between the queen and Honoré Gabriel Riqueti, comte de Mirabeau by informing her about political gossip and public opinion and the fear that Mirabeau would ally himself with the Duke of Orléans. Their information allegedly convinced the queen to meet Auguste Marie Raymond d'Arenberg in the rooms of her maid Marie-Élisabeth Thibault and ask him to meet with Mirabeau in the home of Florimond Claude, Comte de Mercy-Argenteau, resulting in contact between the queen and Mirabeau.

Bertin made several journeys abroad during the Revolution, which attracted attention. She made a trip to England and Germany in 1791–92, leading to suspicions that she was acting as Marie Antoinette's agent. According to these speculations, she secretly visited Francis II, Holy Roman Emperor to deliver a message from Marie Antoinette, as the latter's correspondence was scrutinized and an oral message through a loyal messenger was regarded as the safest method to deliver a sensitive message across borders. This is unconfirmed, but not improbable, as the queen is confirmed to have used her hairdresser Léonard Autié as a messenger during the Flight to Varennes, and it is noted that Henriette Campan claimed that the queen managed to get secret messages to her nephew the emperor during this period. Officially, these were business trips, and Bertin is confirmed to have been in Germany in July 1791, when her presence is noted at the French émigré court in the Castle Schoenbornhut in Koblenz, where she was said to have contributed to the extravagant fashion of the women attending the court.

Bertin was absent from France during the September Massacres, which resulted in her being placed in the list of émigrés. She managed to have herself removed from the list and returned to France in December 1792 to attend to her business. During this stay, popular legend says she destroyed her account books in order to spare the queen from having her bills used against her during her trial. However, this does not appear to be true: all the bills of the queen prior to August 1792 were already in the possession of the government through Henry, liquidator of the civil estate, and there was at that point not yet a trial planned against Marie Antoinette. It would therefore have been pointless for Bertin to destroy her account books for that reason, and the bills of Marie Antoinette were in fact inherited by her heirs, who would demand payment of them until 1830.

In February 1793, Bertin left France for London. For a while, she was able to serve her old clients among the émigrés, and her fashion dolls continued to circulate among European capitals, as far away as Saint Petersburg. During these years, her main income was through demanding payment of bills owed to her by her old foreign clients, such as the queen of Sweden, Sophia Magdalena of Denmark. Her business in Paris still operated, despite her absence, through representatives she appointed and money she sent to it from London, and she still delivered orders to Marie Antoinette.

=== Later career ===
In January 1795, Bertin managed to have her name struck from the list of émigrés through her lawyer, who claimed that she had been absent legally since she left the country for business purposes on a legal passport from July 1792 (omitting her stay in France December 1792-February 1793), and she was thus free to return and resume her business. She is alleged to have acted as a secret messenger for émigrés during this trip, and it is known that she provided them with funds, but this could have been merely a sign of her well-known generosity.

Her business never fully recovered, but continued on a smaller scale. This was partially because of inflation and partially because fashions changed after the French Revolution ended. Joséphine de Beauharnais was among her clients, and she had foreign clients such as Maria Theresa of Naples and Sicily (1799) and Maria Luisa of Parma (1808). She was eventually replaced as the leading fashion designer by Louis Hippolyte Leroy.

As the nineteenth century dawned, Bertin transferred her business to her nephews and retired to her estate in Épinay. She died in 1813 in Épinay-sur-Seine.

=== Acquisition of the nickname 'Rose' ===
As historian Michelle Sapori has noted, Bertin was not known as 'Rose' during her lifetime. The nickname Rose came to be associated with female fashion merchants in general after the publication of Pierre-Jean-Baptiste Nougaret's 1769 novel Ainsi va le monde, which featured a heavily romanticised fashion merchant character called Rose. After Bertin's death, a memoir was published purporting to have been written by Bertin, which was in fact the work of Jacques Peuchet. Peuchet took several liberties in his account of Bertin's life, including inventing love affairs. He used the name Rose to associate the real figure of Bertin with the romanticized image of fashion merchants in the popular imagination.

== Famous quote ==
Bertin is said to have remarked to Marie Antoinette in 1785, when presenting her with a remodelled dress, "Il n'y a de nouveau que ce qui est oublié" ("There is nothing new except what has been forgotten").

== See also ==
- Le Sieur Beaulard
- Mademoiselle Alexandre
- Madame Eloffe
- Marie Madeleine Duchapt
- Turquerie

== Bibliography ==
- Chrisman-Campbell, Kimberly, Fashion Victims: Dress at the Court of Louis XVI and Marie-Antoinette (New Haven and London: Yale University Press, 2015).
- Fraser, Antonia. Marie Antoinette: The Journey (London: Phoenix Press, 2006).
- Guennec, Catherine. La modiste de la reine (Paris: Éditions Jean Claude Lattes, 2004).
- Haru Crowston, Clare. Credit, Fashion, Sex: Economies of Regard in Old Regime France (Durham: Duke University Press, 2013).
- Langlade, Émile. Rose Bertin: Creator of Fashion at the Court of Marie Antoinette (London: John Long, 1913).
- Sapori, Michelle. Rose Bertin: ministre des modes de Marie-Antoinette (Paris: Regard: Institut français de la mode, 2003).
- Weber, Caroline. Queen of Fashion: What Marie Antoinette Wore to the Revolution (London: Aurun, 2007).
