= Madame de Beaumer =

French feminist, journalist and editor

Madame de Beaumer (1720–1766), was a French feminist, journalist and editor. She was the director of the women's magazine Journal des dames (1759–78) from October 1761 to April 1763.

The name and private life of Madame de Beaumer is mainly unknown, but she was reportedly from the Dutch Republic. In 1761, she bought the royalist Journal des Dames and transformed it from a harmless women's magazine to a radical feminist magazine.

She was famous for her radical feminist ideas, and the first female editor in France to publicly argue for education and a professional and independent life for women in her own magazine. She was regarded as very radical, and used confrontational language in her writing. She sold the paper to Catherine Michelle de Maisonneuve in 1763.

== See also ==
- List of women printers and publishers before 1800
