= Louis Hippolyte Leroy =

French grand couturier (1763–1829)

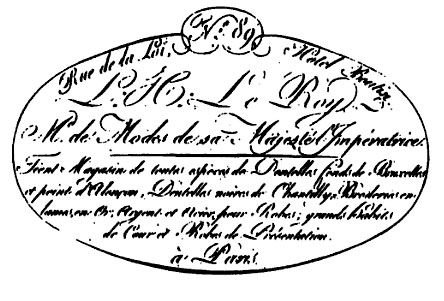
At the head of Hippolyte Leroy's bill, "Fashion Merchant of her Majesty the Empress [Joséphine]", Maison Boutin, rue de la Loi (now rue de Richelieu) in Paris.

Louis Hippolyte Leroy (1763–1829) was a French fashion merchant who founded the House of Leroy, one of the foremost fashion houses of the early 19th century First Empire Paris.

He is known as the favorite fashion trader and the official fashion designer of empress Josephine de Beauharnais. He was very successful and also provided dresses for several other royal and princely courts in Europe during the early 19th century.

== Life ==
Louis Hippolyte Leroy, son of a machinist of the Royal Opera, he was trained to be a hairdresser and employed at the Royal court of Versailles.

He transitioned from hairdresser to hatmaker during the 1790s, and finally to a dressmaker. Between 1800 and 1805, he was the business partner of the famous dressmaker-couturiere Madame Raimbaud.

In 1804, he provided the empress with her coronation costume, which founded his career as a successful fashion trader of the Parisian high society, eventually making himself a millionaire.

During the First Empire, he was a favorite designer of gowns for Empress Joséphine and the women of the Imperial court of Napoleon I, while Madame Herbault made their hats and accessories.

According to Imbert de Saint Amand, Leroy did not actually design the costumes he sold; in fact, he bought the models from designers such as Louis-Philibert Debucourt, Jean-Baptiste Isabey and Auguste Garneray, and simply sold them on to his customers.

He sold his business and retired in 1820.
