= Madame Herbault =

French fashion designer

- Occupations: fashion designer, milliner
- Years active: 19th century
- Known for: favorite milliner of Empress Joséphine

Madame Herbault (early 19th century), was a French fashion designer (milliner).

Madame Herbault was an established fashion designer during the First Empire, when she was the most fashionable milliner in Paris, and she continued to enjoy a fashionable career during the Bourbon Restoration and the July Monarchy. She was known to be "almost too bold" in her style, enjoyed international fame and noted to have many customers among the foreign courts of Europe.

She was a favorite milliner of Empress Joséphine and the women of the Imperial court of Napoleon I. While Louis Hippolyte Leroy often designed the gowns to the ladies of the court, Herbault designed the hats and accessories.
