= Marie-Emilie Maryon de Montanclos =

Marie-Emilie Maryon de Montanclos, Baroness de Prinzen (1736–1812), was a French feminist, journalist, poet, playwright, and editor. She was the director of the women's magazine Journal des dames (1759–78)

== Life and career ==
De Montanclos was born in Aix-en-Provence in 1736. Her first marriage ended with her husband's death, and her second marriage ended in a legal separation. In 1774, she became editor of Journal des dames. In this role, she attempted to further its feminist aims, and used her position to seek support for social reforms.

Later, de Montanclos became director of the Théâtre Montansier at Versailles. Between 1782 and 1804, she wrote a number of comedy plays, some of which were performed.
