= Mademoiselle Alexandre =

French fashion merchant

Mademoiselle Alexandre (d. after 1779), was a French fashion merchant.

Mademoiselle Alexandre came from a family of dressmakers. In 1740, she opened a fashion shop at the Rue de la Monnaie in Paris. She foremost sold accessories and trimmings, which was, at the time, the most important items within fashion, as the models of dresses were always the same in the period of 1740–1770 and fashion trends were expressed by accessories and trimmings.

She had a successful career and reportedly supplied fashion products to the aristocracy for forty years. She eventually supplanted Marie Madeleine Duchapt, known as "La Duchapt", who had been the leading fashion merchant in the 1730s- and 1750s. During the last years of Louis XV, Alexandre was described as the top fashion merchant in Paris alongside Le sieur Beaulard, and Sébastien Mercier in Tableau de Paris described her and Beulard and the two rulers of fashion. Her fame gave her international clients, and she was able to import and export her fashion products. She had clients within the ladies-in-waitings of the royal court, and was given the assignment of providing the French wardrobes of the princesses Marie Joséphine of Savoy and Maria Theresa of Savoy when they married into the royal house in 1771 and 1773. She also became the regular dressmaker of the two princesses after their arrival.

In the late 1770s, she was replaced in her position as fashion leader by Rose Bertin, and the competition with Bertin reportedly resulted in her bankruptcy.
