= Marchande de modes =

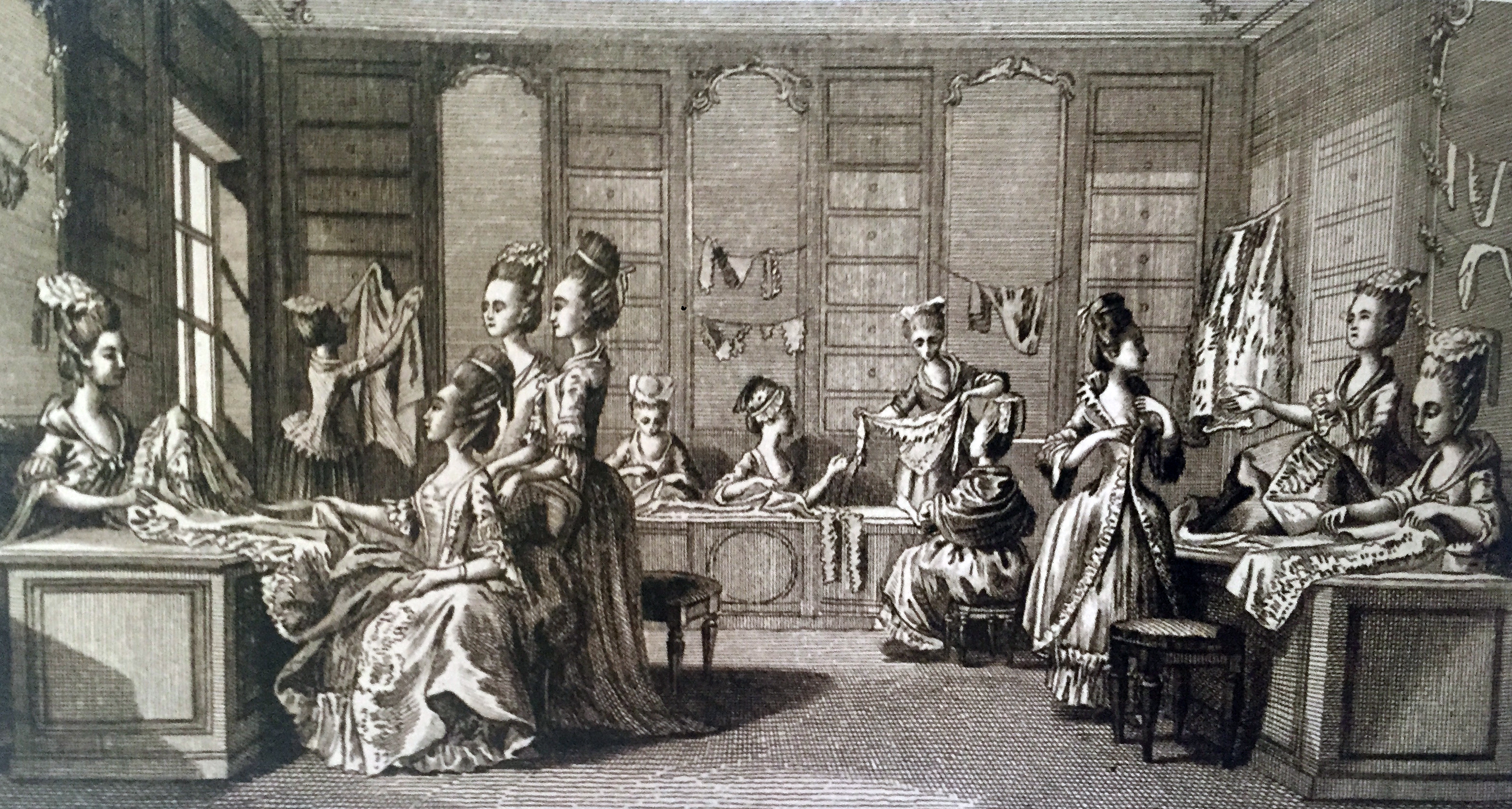
La Marchande de modes, 1769 engraving by Jacques Renaud Benard

Marchande de modes was a French Guild organisation for women fashion merchants or milliners, normally meaning ornaments for headdresses, hats and dresses, within the city of Paris, active from August 1776 until 1791. It played a dominating role within the commercial life and fashion industry of France during the last decades prior to the French Revolution. One of the most famous members was Rose Bertin.

A fashion merchant was a businessperson specialising in the production and the sale of fashion accessories, especially adornments for hairstyles and gowns. The profession emerged in the early eighteenth century and reached its height at the end of the same century. The women and occasional men who practised as fashion merchants played a central role in the diffusion of styles in this period.

The profession was defined by being formalized in a guild with the name Marchandes de modes (English: "Fashion Merchant") between 1776 and 1791. It was the 4th guild in Paris open for women after the Maîtresses marchandes lingères, the Maîtresses couturières and the Maîtresses bouquetières, and was abolished with the abolition of the guild system in 1791.

== Emergence of the fashion merchant ==
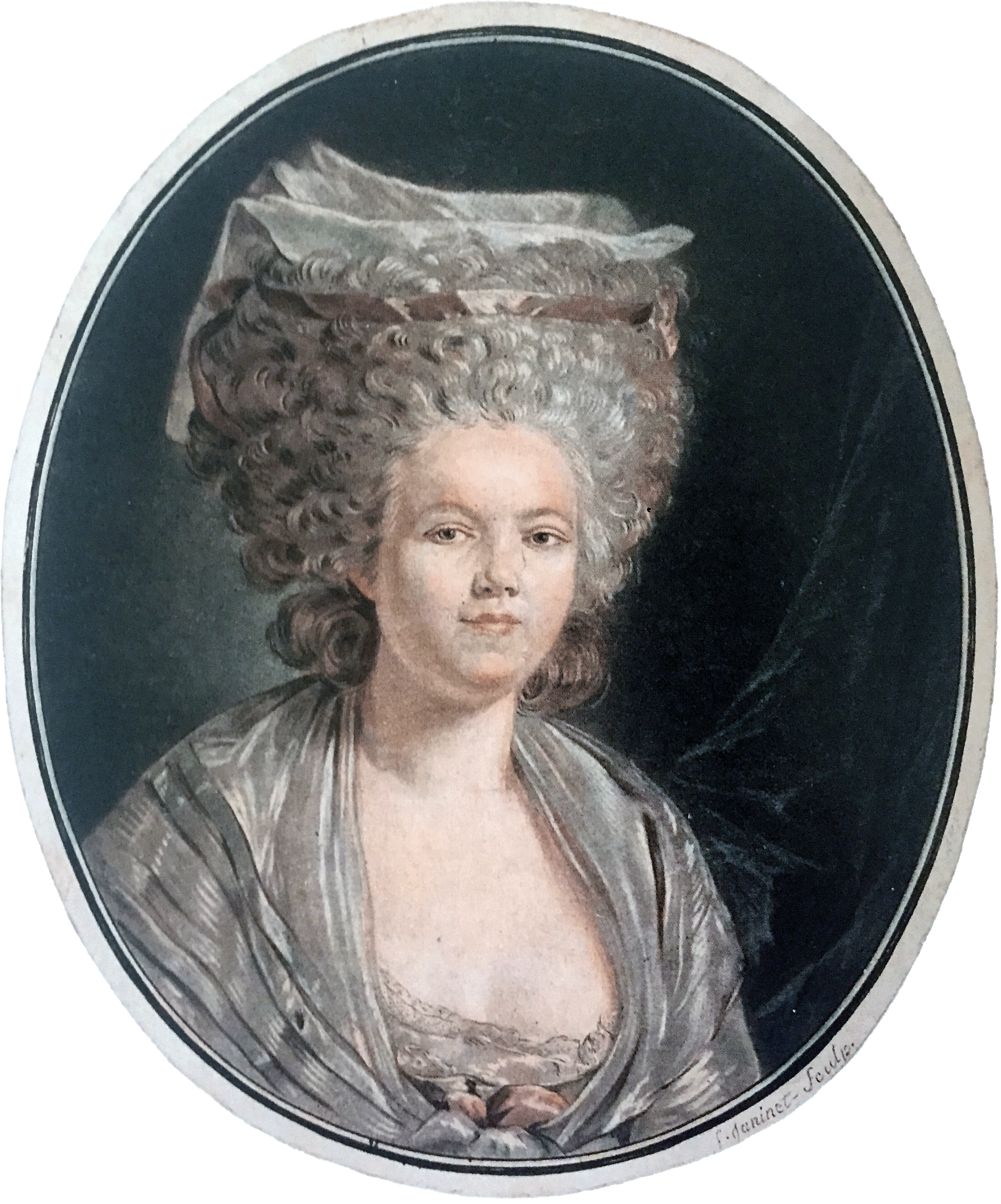
Marie-Jeanne [Rose] Bertin, 1747–1813, fashion merchant.

The profession of fashion merchant emerged from the guild of mercers around 1760–1765. At first, the role was described as a "talent" possessed by the wives of mercers. In eighteenth-century France, the corporations of tailors and then seamstresses held a monopoly on the creation of a garment. Fashion merchants usually only worked on the ornamentation of clothing that had already been stitched together, although they could produce certain small items (such as belts, cravats, bows, shawls, capes, etc.). In the course of their work, fashion merchants used a variety of materials including taffeta, gauze, feathers, ribbons, lace, artificial flowers, embroidery, passementerie, and furs – therefore working with a multitude of suppliers and artisans.

In August 1776, the reorganisation of guild structures saw the creation of a guild for the "fashion merchants, feather-dressers, and flower-makers of the city and the suburbs of Paris" with Marie-Jeanne [Rose] Bertin at its head. This new guild formally established fashion merchants as independent from mercers. Technically, the guild of fashion merchants was exclusively female, although some men did also practise as fashion merchants since their wives belonged to the guild (such as Jean-Joseph Beaulard). From 1776 onwards, it was no longer necessary to be the wife of a mercer to work as a fashion merchant.

== Dissemination of styles ==
Fashion merchants were the subject of much discussion in contemporary texts, including Louis Sébastien Mercier's Tableau de Paris, and the encyclopaedias of Diderot and Panckoucke. They were regarded as an important figure of the age, as demonstrated by the variety of visual representations in the Galerie des modes et costumes français (a prominent fashion periodical), and in the paintings of François Boucher and Philibert-Louis Debucourt.

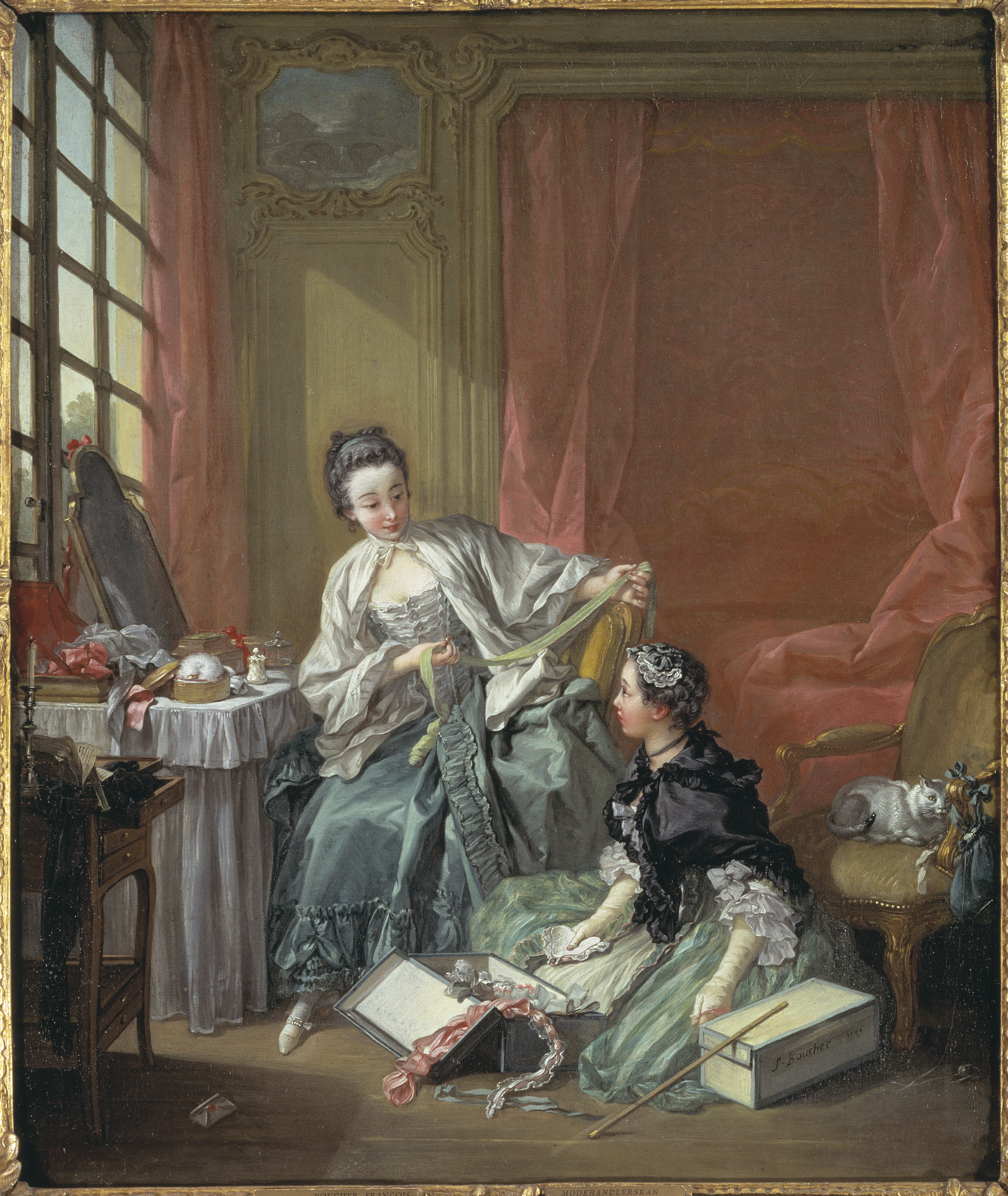
La Marchande de modes by François Boucher.

In the eighteenth century, the silhouette of fashionable dress changed relatively little. Novelty therefore came from the ornamentation of clothing, which changed rapidly according to fashion and helped to express personal and wider social identity. The task fell to fashion merchants to 'stitch and arrange daily the fashions that they and their customers dreamed up'.

While the adornment of gowns and the arrangement of hairstyles constituted the core of fashion merchants' activities, fashion merchants also played a pivotal role in the diffusion of style. Their ideas therefore influenced many other professions such as tailors, seamstresses, and linen sellers.

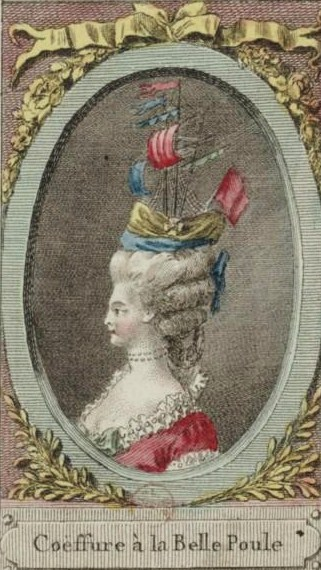
Coiffure Belle-Poule

The years 1770–1780 saw an acceleration of change in fashionable adornment, with hairstyles becoming emblematic of the constant drive for novelty. Thanks to fashion, hair became a site for the staging of identity and current affairs. The coiffure à la belle poule is a spectacular example of the relationship between news and fashion. The hairstyle integrated a model of a French frigate named La Belle Poule which became famous after winning a naval battle against the English in 1778. This period also saw numerous caricatures disseminated across Europe which made fun of the height of fashionable hairstyles. Although the work of fashion merchants was therefore not universally admired, it was universally discussed.

== Rose Bertin and her contemporaries ==
In the 1770s, there were only a handful of fashion merchants, but the profession expanded quickly in the 1780s in Paris and across France. Some of the main figures of the age included Marie-Jeanne [Rose] Bertin, Jean-Joseph Beaulard, and Mademoiselle Alexandre. Louis-Sébastien Mercier dedicated a chapter of his Tableau de Paris to fashion merchants, mentioning Beaulard and Alexandre by name, and claiming that 'the work of fashion is an art; a cherished art, triumphant, which in this century has received honours and distinctions'.

Perhaps the most famous fashion merchant was Mlle Bertin, who enjoyed considerable notoriety during her career. Bertin was the foremost supplier of Marie-Antoinette's wardrobe, and developed a close relationship with the Queen, so much so that she became known as the 'Minister of Fashion'. Bertin's dramatic rise to fame from relatively humble origins in Picardy to the inner circle of the Queen alarmed members of the aristocracy, including Marie-Antoinette's lady-in-waiting Madame Campan. Campan believed that 'the mere admission of a milliner into the house of the Queen was followed by evil consequences to her Majesty' –namely, Marie-Antoinette's growing obsession with fashion. Although Bertin had considerable success during the reign of Louis XVI and Marie-Antoinette, her business suffered during the Revolution.

== Legacy ==
The considerable status of the fashion merchant, especially the female fashion merchant, began to decline in the early decades of the nineteenth century. Nevertheless, a handful of fashion merchants continued to supply the French royal court, including Louis Hippolyte Leroy and Marie-Françoise Corot. The influential role of fashion merchants in disseminating new trends paved the way for the great designers of the nineteenth and twentieth centuries, such as Charles Frederick Worth and Coco Chanel.

== See also ==
- Maîtresses marchandes lingères
- Maîtresses couturières

== Bibliography ==
- Benjamin Alvarez-Araujo, Adélaïde Henriette Damoville, dite Mme Eloffe (1759-1805). Autour d'une marchande de modes imaginaire, mémoire de Master 2 sous la direction de Laurence Croq, Université Paris-Nanterre, 2020.
- James-Sarazin, Ariane et Lapasin, Régis (2006). Gazette des atours de Marie-Antoinette. Paris: Réunion des Musées Nationaux - Archives nationales.
- Kimberley Chrisman-Campbell (2015). Fashion Victims: Dress at the Court of Louis XVI and Marie-Antoinette. New Haven: Yale University Press.
- Clare Haru Crowston (2013). Credit, Fashion, Sex: Economies of Regard in Old Regime France. Durham: Duke University Press.
- Natacha Coquery (1998). L’ hôtel aristocratique: le marché du luxe à Paris au XVIIIe siècle. Histoire moderne 39. Paris: Publications de la Sorbonne.
- Jennifer Jones (1996). ‘Coquettes and Grisettes: Women Buying and Selling in Ancien Régime Paris’. In The Sex of Things: Gender and Consumption in Historical Perspective, edited by Victoria de Grazia and Ellen Furlough, 25–53. Berkley and Los Angeles: University of California Press.
- Daniel Roche (1989). La culture des apparences. Paris: Fayard.
- Michelle Sapori (2010). Rose Bertin, couturière de Marie-Antoinette. Paris: Perrin.
- Michelle Sapori (2004). Rose Bertin, ministre des modes de Marie-Antoinette. Paris: Institut Français de la Mode - Regard.
- Carolyn Sargentson (1996). Merchants and Luxury Markets: The Marchands Merciers of Eighteenth-Century Paris. London and Malibu: Victoria and Albert Museum in association with the J. Paul Getty Museum.
