= Die Neue Sammlung =

Design Museum in Munich, Germany

Coordinates: 48°08′49″N 11°34′20″E

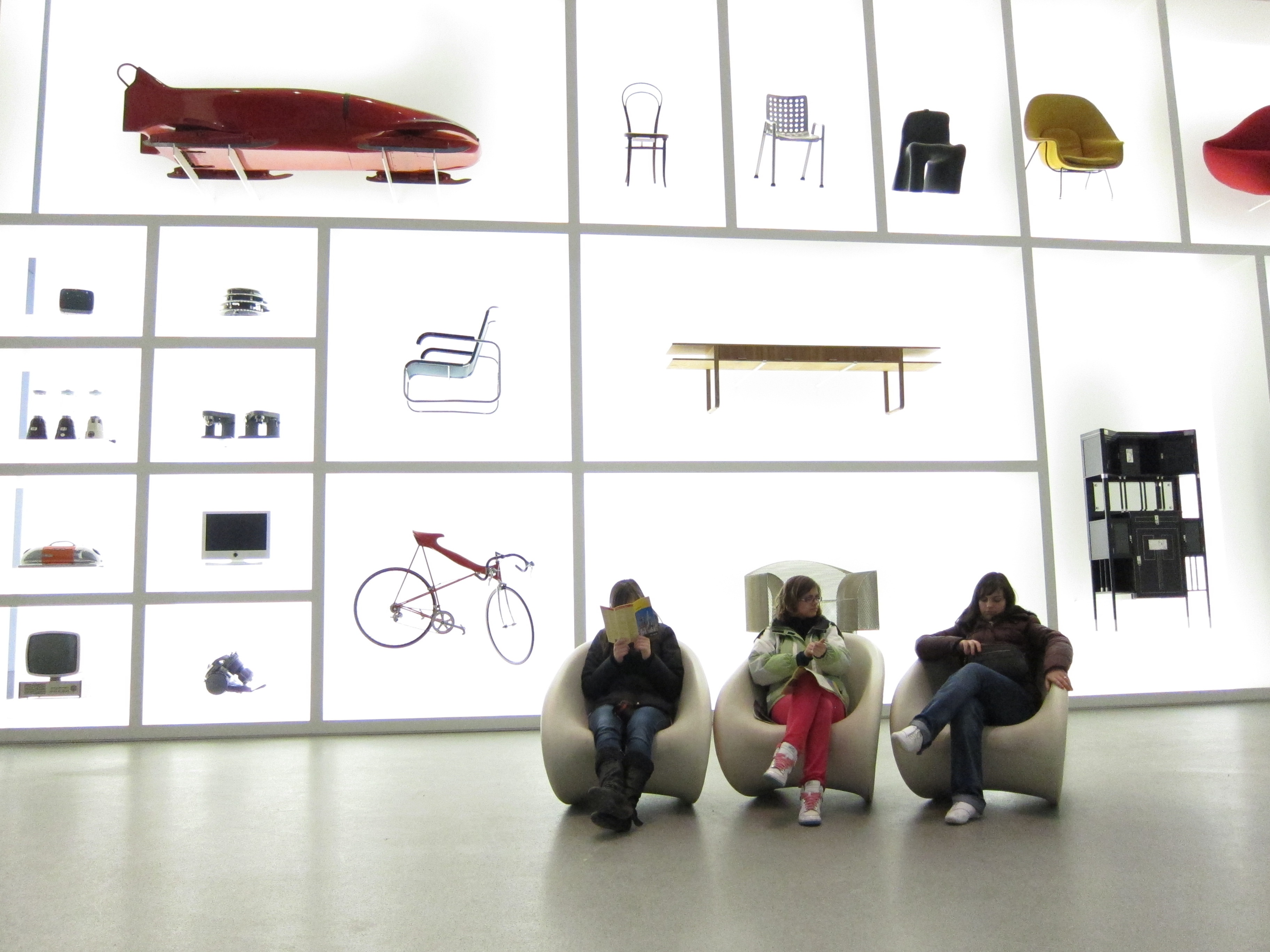
Entry area

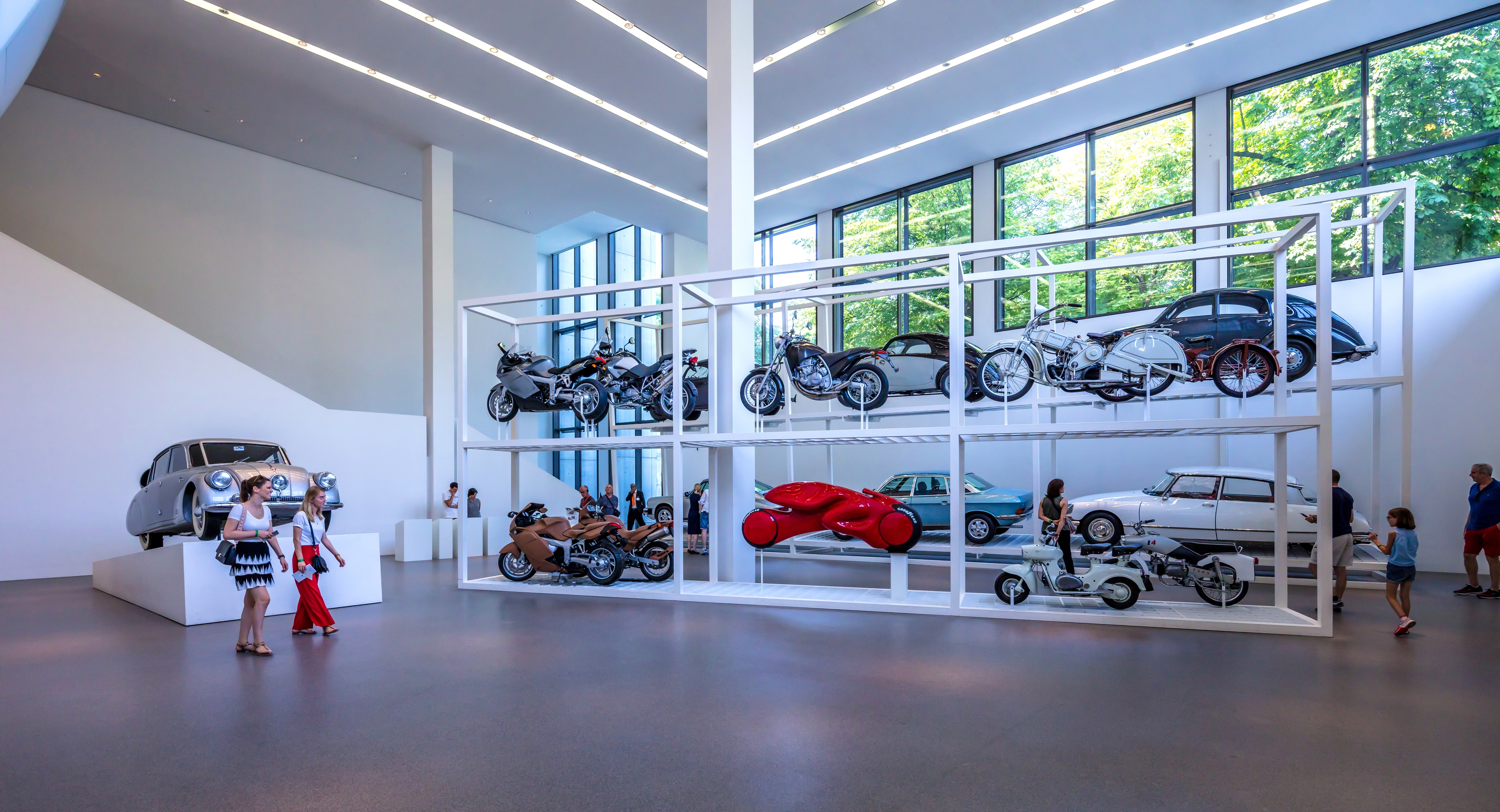
Vehicles

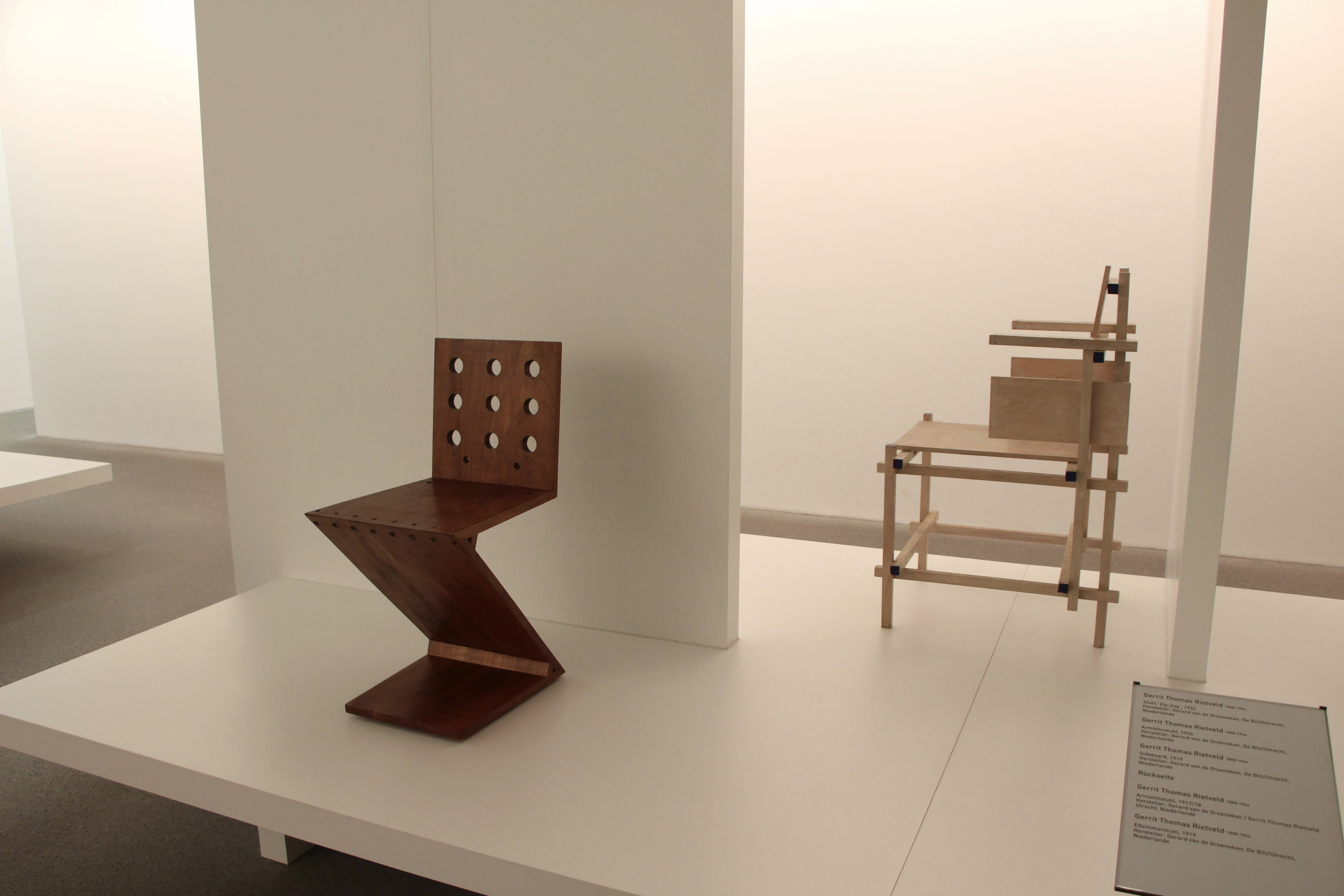
Examples of exhibited furniture, these by Gerrit Rietveld, 2021

Die Neue Sammlung is one of the leading design museums in the world, with the largest collection of industrial and product design.

Founded in 1907 with the ideas of the German Werkbund, Die Neue Sammlung became an official state museum in 1925. It is considered the world’s oldest design museum – regarded as such long before the word design acquired this meaning.

Since then, Die Neue Sammlung has been making design history with its international acquisitions and stimulating exhibitions. With over 100,000 catalogued items, Die Neue Sammlung is among the world’s largest design collections. It is very wide-ranging, with the collection covering over 20 different areas, embracing product and industrial design, furniture design, and graphic design, as well as topics such as mobility and interface design. Ceramics and glass are focal areas, as are Jewellery and Appliances, not to mention selected objects in the field of crafted design.

== History ==
Founded in 1907 in line with the ideas of the German Werkbund, it was inaugurated as an official state museum in 1925. From the very beginning it distinguished itself from the museums of arts and crafts of the day by committing firmly to espousing the Modernism of the times and thus contemporary design. To this day, the Neue Sammlung’s agenda pursue those initial objectives.

== Exhibitions (selection) ==
A typical year will see more than a dozen different exhibitions being staged, covering all areas of the collection. Notable exhibitions of recent years have been:

- 2022: The Bicycle – Cult Object – Design Object: Designs by Togashi Engineering, Paul Jaray, Alex Moulton, Luigi Colani, Richard Sapper, Giorgetto Giugiaro, Marc Newson, and Ross Lovegrove.
- 2021: AI.Robotics.Design: AI from Leibniz’ calculating machine through to intelligent robots and algorithms today
- 2019: Thonet & Design: Works by Stefan Diez, Norman Foster, James Irvine, Naoto Fukusawa, and Konstantin Grcic
- 2017: Munich | Hella Jongerius & Louise Schouwenberg, Beyond the New
- 2015: Munich | Konstantin Grcic: The Good, The Bad, The Ugly
- 2013: Nuremberg | Patricia Urquiola and Rosenthal. Landscape
- 2011: Nuremberg | Alessandro Mendini – Wunderkammer Design
- 2004: Munich | Karim Rashid – I want to change the world
