= Schepers Bosman =

Dutch fashion designer

- Industry: Fashion
- Founded: 2017
- Founders: Sanne Schepers, Anne Bosman
- Headquarters: The Netherlands
- Key people: Sanne Schepers, Anne Bosman
- Products: Clothing, accessories and Interior Design
- Website: schepersbosman.com

Schepers Bosman is a Dutch fashion designer duo consisting of Sanne Schepers (born 1989, Heerlen, The Netherlands) and Anne Bosman (born 1988, Amsterdam, The Netherlands).

== Background ==
Sanne Schepers and Anne Bosman both graduated with honors in 2011 from ArtEZ University of Arts in Arnhem, BA fashion design. Their graduation collections were awarded with various fashion prizes. Schepers continued her studies at the Institut Français de la Mode (IFM) in Paris. She was selected by the team of Robert Clergerie to specialize her studies further at l’Ēcole-de-Style in Romans-sur-Isère. Bosman graduated from Central Saint Martins London, MA Menswear. They gained work experience at Clergerie, Christopher Kane, Viktor & Rolf and Alexander van Slobbe, before starting their designer duo collaboration named Schepers Bosman in 2017.

The duo presented their debut collection at the 26th edition of the Amsterdam Fashion Week in 2017. Shortly thereafter they won the Mercedes-Benz Les Etoiles Award on the eve of the Paris fashion week, the jury consisted of Alexis Mabille and Dita von Teese among others.

All Schepers Bosman collections and garments are designed, developed and produced in the Netherlands. New collection presentations and sales take place during the menswear fashionweeks in Paris.

=== Style ===
Schepers and Bosman's collection has been praised for their originality and quality. The items are designed with raw, visible seams and a wide fit, with their oversized shirts and denims has been particularly praised. The collection also include re-designed workwear and suits along with the patchwork-heavy jumpsuits and trousers. The silhouettes are then dressed in vibrant color palettes of pinks, blues and purples, while darker tones are featured heavily on the outerwear looks.

== Awards ==
- 2021 – Dutch Design Awards (Nominee)
- 2017 – Mercedes-Benz Les Etoiles Award
- 2012 – H&M Design Award Peoples Choice Award
- 2012 – H&M Design Award The Netherlands
- 2011 – Lichting Talent Award

== Collaborations ==
- Schepers Bosman for Mephisto – Mephisto x Schepers Bosman (2023)
- Schepers Bosman for Royal Auping – Royal Auping x Schepers Bosman (2020)
- Schepers Bosman for Hacked By – Hacked By_ x Schepers Bosman (2020)
- Schepers Bosman for Pinqponq – pinqponq x Schepers Bosman (2019)

== Exhibitions ==
- 2026 – ‘’Reflections on Fashion’’, group exhibition, Kunstmuseum Den Haag, The Hague
- 2023 – ‘’The Oasis’’, group exhibition, Bureau Europa, Maastricht
- 2023 – ‘’Piet Paris e.a.’’, group exhibition, Museum Jan, Amstelveen
- 2021 – ‘’Dutch Design Week’’, group exhibition, MicroLab, Eindhoven
- 2021 – ‘’Maison Amsterdam’’, group exhibition, Nieuwe Kerk, Amsterdam
- 2021 – ‘’CONSUMPTION’’, group exhibition, FDFA Arnhem, Arnhem
- 2018 – ‘’WOW Fashion Inside Out’’, group exhibition, We Make The City, Amsterdam
- 2018 – ‘’Schuit@Qade’’, group exhibition, Art Rotterdam, Cruise Terminal, Rotterdam
- 2017 – ‘’Schuit - Stijl Ontkleed’, group exhibition, FDFA Arnhem, Arnhem
