= Amsterdam Fashion Week =

Dutch fashion industry event

- Genre: Fashion catwalk shows, clothing and fashion exhibitions and surrounding events
- Frequency: Biannually
- Locations: Amsterdam, The Netherlands
- People: Danie Bles
- Website: amsterdamfashionweek.nl

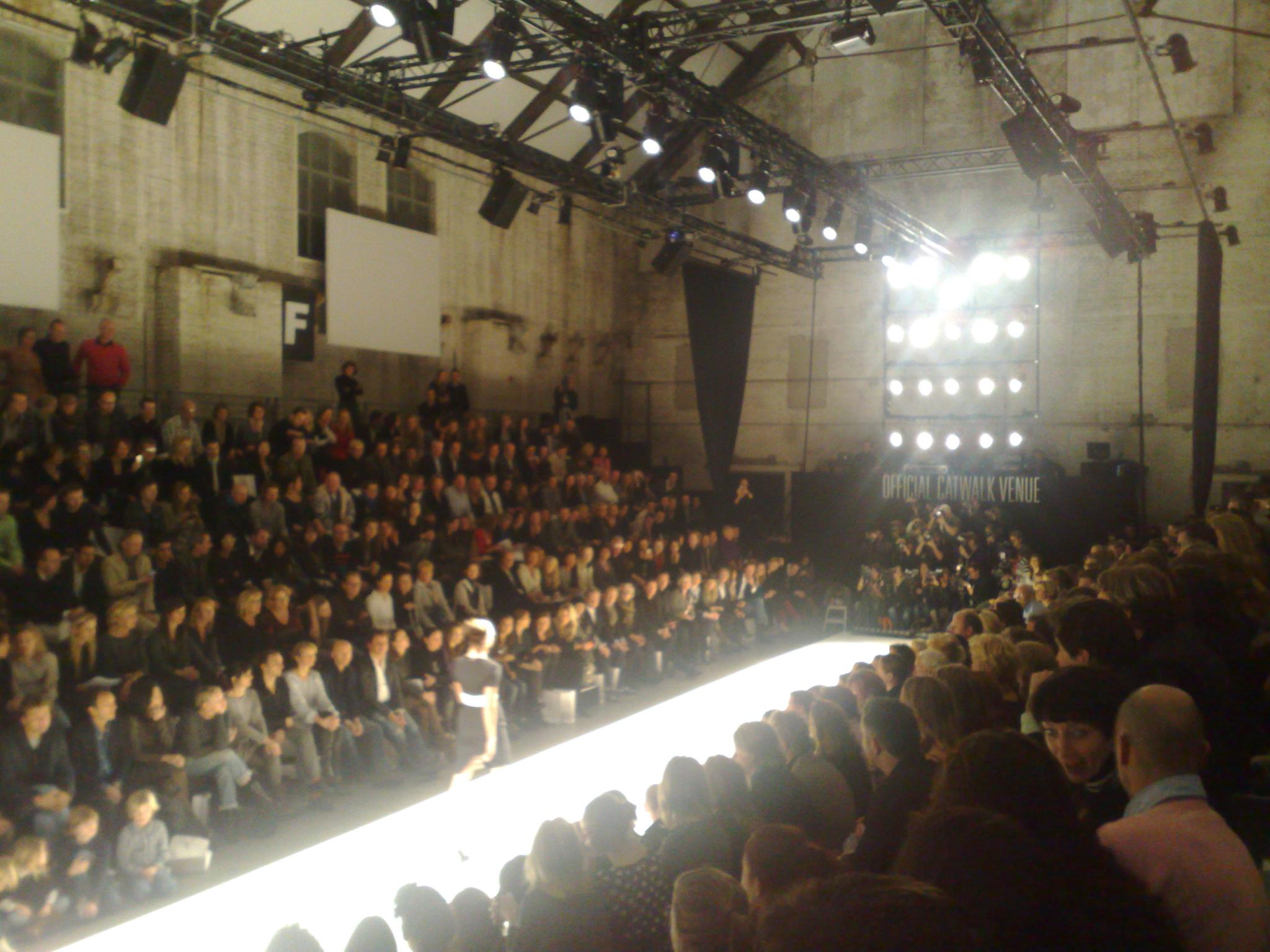
fashion week westergas Amsterdam

Amsterdam Fashion Week (AFW) is a fashion event that takes place in Amsterdam, The Netherlands biannually. Both established brands and starting designers show their collections. The AFW used to be held at the Westergasfabriek location, but after takeover by fashion entrepreneur Danie Bles the fashion week switches locations ever season. In addition to the runway shows, which were open to invited guests and public with purchased tickets, the event also had a program open to the public called AIFW Downtown. The Downtown event consisted exhibitions, parties, store openings and other events in the field of fashion, spread throughout the city of Amsterdam. Since the takeover in 2018 everything has been placed under one coherent official program.

An annual show on the program is Lichting since 2007. The show aims to present the best Dutch academy fashion students of one year, all together in one show to present themselves. Afterwards a jury will determine the best graduation collection, this student will win a sum of 10,000 euros.

== History ==
From 1947, until the end of the 1950s, a biannually fashion week was held in the Netherlands as Amsterdam Fashion Week. It was organized by the Dutch Women's Clothing Industry. with the collapse of the Dutch clothing industry, the event was stopped. The first edition of its current form was created in 2004, the event consisted three catwalk shows. At the start the emphasis has not been on ready-made clothing but on the promotion of Dutch fashion designers. The current focus is back on both sides.

== Well-known (former) participants ==
- Bas Kosters
- Camiel Fortgens
- Claes Iversen
- David Laport
- Duran Lantink
- Elsien Gringhuis
- Francisco van Benthum
- Hacked By
- Iris van Herpen
- Jan Taminiau
- Liselore Frowijn
- Maison the Faux
- Mattijs van Bergen
- Ninamounah
- Ronald van der Kemp
- Rushemy Botter
- Schepers Bosman
- Sophie Hardeman
- Spijkers en Spijkers
- Vanilia
