= Warmenhoven & Venderbos =

Dutch clothing label

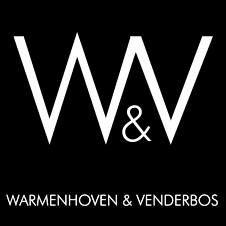
- Founded: 1996; 29 years ago
- Headquarters: Netherlands
- Key people: Sascha Warmenhoven; Babette Venderbos
- Website: http://www.warmenhoven-venderbos.com/

Warmenhoven & Venderbos is a Netherlands-based clothing label founded in 1996 by Sascha Warmenhoven and Babette Venderbos.

== History ==
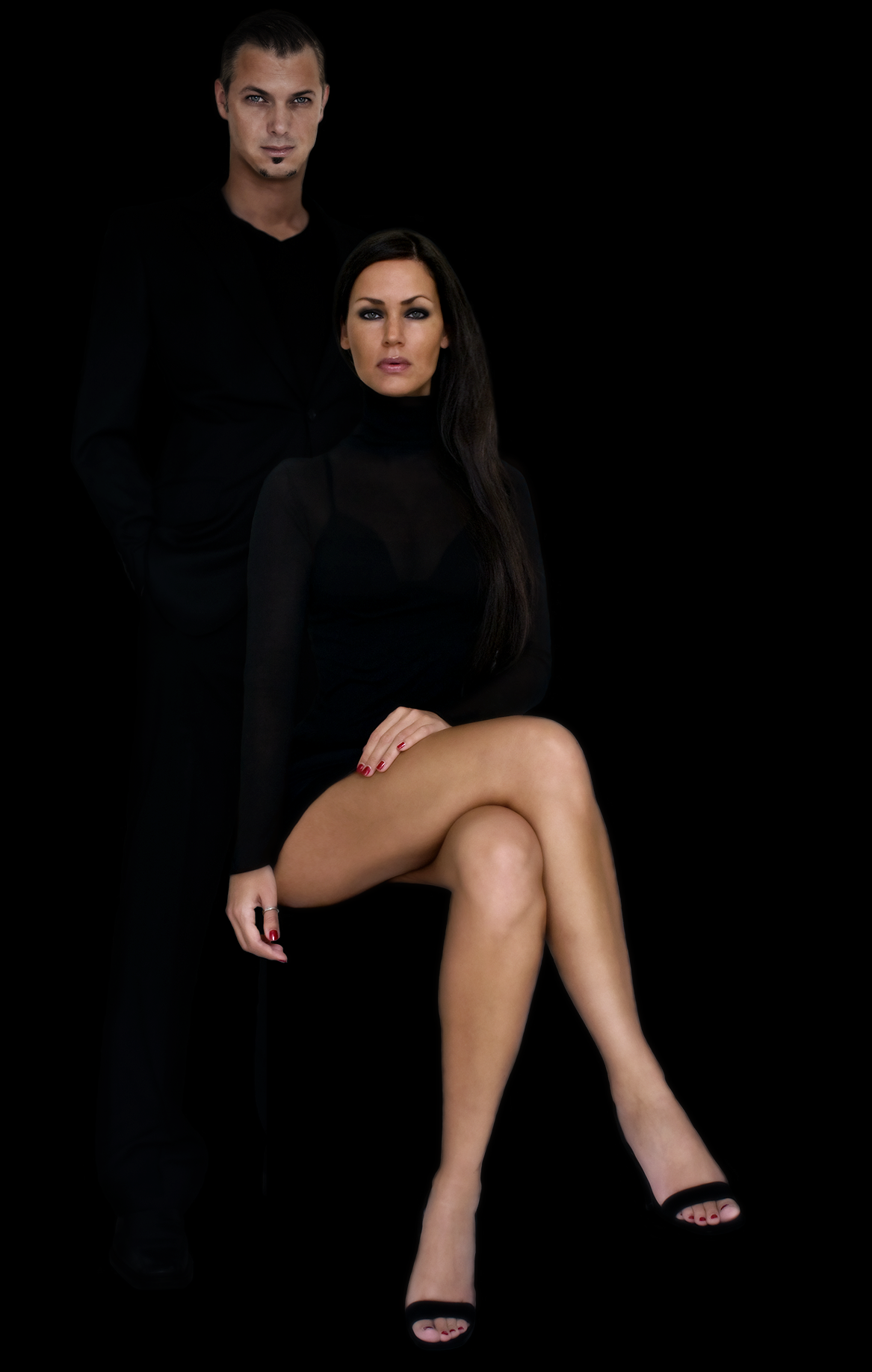
The two founders, Sascha Warmenhoven (left) and Babette Venderbos (right), c. 2009

The Netherlands-based label is the partnership of Sascha Warmenhoven and Babette Venderbos. The two met while studying at the Academy of Fine Arts in Rotterdam. During their studies, the two pursued art and fashion. Sascha Warmenhoven, a native from the Netherlands but born in Germany, went on to work for major sportswear labels such as Falcon Sportwears and Spirito Sportivo after graduation. During his studies, he managed to garner internships with Walter Van Beirendonck and Dirk Van Saene.

Babette Venderbos is a native of the Netherlands who interned with So by Alexander van Slobbe and worked for Maison Martin Margiela. They later decided to work together and launched their first collection in 1996. They didn't make their name official until 2000.
