= H&M Design Award =

Annual award for young fashion designers

- Description: Supporting fashion graduates in starting their professional careers
- Country: Sweden (Global eligibility)
- Presented by: Hennes & Mauritz AB

The H&M Design Award is a design prize for fashion graduates. The prize was established in 2012 to support young designers with starting careers in fashion. The prize is awarded every year by Hennes & Mauritz AB (H&M), a Swedish multinational clothing-retail company. This prize was not awarded in 2021 or 2022.

== Recipients ==
Year	Recipient	Prize	Academy	City	Country
2012	Stine Riis	Jury prize	London College of Fashion	London	United Kingdom
2012	Anne Bosman	Public prize	ArtEZ Institute of the Arts	Arnhem	The Netherlands
2013	Minju Kim	Jury prize	Royal Academy of Fine Arts	Antwerp	Belgium
2013	Alba Prat	Public prize	Universität der Künste	Berlin	Germany
2014	Eddie Anemian	Jury prize	La Cambre	Brussels	Belgium
2014	Henriette Tilanus	Public prize	ArtEZ Institute of the Arts	Arnhem	The Netherlands
2015	Ximon Lee	Jury prize	Parsons School of Design	New York	USA
2015	Magdalena Brozda	Public prize	Geneva University of Art and Design	Geneva	Switzerland
2016	Hannah Jinkins	Jury prize	Royal College of Arts	London	United Kingdom
2017	Richard Quinn	Jury prize	Central Saint Martins	London	United Kingdom
2018	Stefan Cooke	Jury prize	Central Saint Martins	London	United Kingdom
2019	Priya Ahluwalia	Jury prize	University of Westminster	London	United Kingdom
2020	Sabine Skarule	Jury prize	Royal Academy of Fine Arts	Antwerp	Belgium

== See also ==
- List of fashion awards
