= Alice Rawsthorn =

British design critic and author (born 1958)

Alice Rawsthorn OBE
- Born: 1958 (age 67–68); Manchester, U.K.
- Education: Cambridge University (BA)
- Occupations: Design critic; journalist; author
- Known for: Design criticism for Financial Times and The New York Times; Books Hello World and Design as an Attitude; Director of Design Museum (2001–2006)
- Awards: OBE (2014)
- Website: alicerawsthorn.com

Alice Rawsthorn OBE (born 1958 in Manchester) is a British design critic and author. Her books include Design as an Attitude (2018) and Hello World: Where Design Meets Life (2013). She is chair of the board of trustees at the Chisenhale Gallery in London and at The Hepworth Wakefield gallery in Yorkshire. Rawsthorn is a founding member of Writers at Liberty, a group of writers who are committed to supporting the work of the human rights charity Liberty. She was appointed Officer of the Order of the British Empire (OBE) in the 2014 Birthday Honours for services to design and the arts.

== Education and career in journalism ==
Rawsthorn graduated in art and architectural history from Cambridge University and joined the Thomson Organisation as a graduate trainee on their journalism scheme, moving on to become media editor of Campaign magazine. In 1985, Rawsthorn joined the Financial Times, where she worked as a foreign correspondent in Paris before becoming the FT's architecture and design critic in 2000.

Rawsthorn joined The New York Times in 2006 as design critic of its international edition (then the International Herald Tribune) to write a weekly syndicated column on design. From 2014 to 2017 she wrote the By Design column for Frieze magazine. Those columns were revised and expanded for publication in Design as an Attitude.

== Work in the arts ==
While at the Financial Times, Rawsthorn became a member of the Design Council and a trustee of the Design Museum. In 2001, she was appointed director of the Design Museum. During this period, the museum launched the Designer of the Year award and mounted the Great Design Quest in collaboration with the BBC. She resigned in February 2006, reportedly over differences concerning the future direction of the museum.

Rawsthorn was a trustee of Arts Council England (2007–2013), having previously served for four years as its lead adviser on the visual arts. She was chair of the Turning Point review of contemporary visual arts, which resulted in a record increase in public funding. She has served on many arts juries, including the Turner Prize for contemporary art, the Stirling Prize for architecture, the British Council's selection panel for the Venice Architecture Biennale, the PEN History Book Prize, the Aga Khan Award for Architecture, the Buckminster Fuller Challenge, the BAFTA film and television Awards and the Museum of the Year prize run by the Art Fund. A former chair of the British Council's Design Advisory Group, she was also a member of the British government's advisory panel on the BBC Charter Review.

In 2012, Rawsthorn joined the board of the Chisenhale Gallery in London as chair of the board of trustees and in 2018 was appointed chair of the board of trustees of The Hepworth Wakefield in Yorkshire. In 2019, she was appointed as a member of the Honours committee for Arts and Media.

Between 2015 and 2018, Rawsthorn was chair of the board of trustees of Michael Clark Company, the contemporary dance group, having been a trustee for three years. She was a trustee of the Whitechapel Gallery in London from 1993 until 2018.

== Other activities and writing ==
A public speaker on design, Rawsthorn has participated in the World Economic Forum (WEF) at Davos, the TED 2016 conference and the World Economic Forum's Global Agenda Council on Design. Her awards for work in design include an honorary senior fellowship from the Royal College of Art and an honorary doctorate from the University of the Arts.

Rawsthorn has contributed essays to books on design and contemporary culture, including monographs of the work of the designers Hella Jongerius and the Bouroullec brothers, and is the author of a biography of the fashion designer Yves Saint Laurent. Her book, Hello World: Where Design Meets Life (2013), explores design's influence on daily life past, present and future from the skull and crossbones, used as a global symbol of terror by 18th-century pirates, to the evolution of the World Cup football and advances in supercomputing. It was published by Hamish Hamilton in the UK and by The Overlook Press in the US. It has appeared in five further editions: Czech, Japanese, Korean, Simplified (China) and Traditional (Taiwan) Chinese. Rawsthorn's 2018 book, Design as an Attitude, explains how design is responding to an age of intense economic, political and ecological instability. It charts different aspects of contemporary design, from its role in interpreting new technologies and the emergence of a new wave of digitally empowered designers in Africa, to the craft revival, design's gender politics and its use in expressing our increasingly fluid personal identities.

== Publications ==
- Rawsthorn, Alice (1996). Yves Saint Laurent. HarperCollins. ISBN 978-0-00-255543-2.
- Rawsthorn, Alice (1999). Marc Newson. Booth-Clibborn Editions. ISBN 978-1-86154-062-1.
- Staple, Polly; Gronlund, Melissa, eds. (2006). Frieze Projects: Artists Commissions and Talks 2003–2005. Frieze. ISBN 978-0-9553201-0-1.
- Barnard, Malcolm, ed. (2007). Fashion Theory: A Reader. Routledge. ISBN 978-0-415-41340-4.
- Guixe, Marti, ed. (2007). Don't Buy It If You Don't Need It. Camper. ISBN 978-84-609-9135-9.
- Gomez-Paladio, Bryony; Vit, Arman, eds. (2008). Women of Design: Influence and Inspiration. How Books. ISBN 978-1-60061-085-1.
- Wakefield, Neville; Higgie, Jennifer, eds. (2009). Frieze Projects and Frieze Talks: 2006–2008. Frieze. ISBN 978-0-9553201-5-6.
- Schwartz, Katrina; Vaughan, Hannah, eds. (2009). Rises in the East: A Gallery in Whitechapel. Whitechapel Gallery. ISBN 978-0-85488-171-0.
- Greff, Jean-Pierre, ed. (2009). AC|DC – Contemporary Art, Contemporary Design. JRP Ringier. ISBN 978-3-905770-74-2.
- Articulado, ed. (2010). Articulado on Design. ADCV.
- Friedrichs, Arnd; Finger, Kerstin, eds. (2010). 220° VirusMonobloc: The Infamous Chair. Gestalten. ISBN 978-3-89955-317-8.
- Moggridge, Bill, ed. (2010). Designing Media. The MIT Press. ISBN 978-0-262-01485-4.
- Schouwenberg, Louise, ed. (2011). Hella Jongerius: Misfit. Phaidon. ISBN 978-0-7148-5987-3.
- Guenin, Hélène; Le Bon, Laurent, eds. (2012). Ronan and Erwan Bouroullec: Bivouac. Centre Pompidou-Metz. ISBN 978-2-35983-016-3.
- Rawsthorn, Alice (2013). Hello World: Where Design Meets Life. Hamish Hamilton. ISBN 978-0-241-14530-2.
- Rawsthorn, Alice (2018). Design as an Attitude. JRP|Ringier Documents Series. ISBN 978-3-03764-521-5.
- Antonelli, Paola; Rawsthorn, Alice (2022). Design Emergency: Building a Better Future. Phaidon Press. ISBN 978-1-83866-427-5.
