= Cynthia Lenige =

Frisian poet

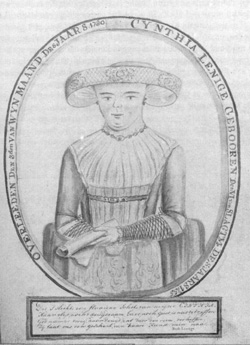
- Born: 6 November 1755; Makkum, Friesland, Dutch Republic
- Died: 3 October 1780 (aged 24); Makkum, Friesland, Dutch Republic
- Occupation: Writer
- Writing career
- Pen name: Kynke Lenige
- Period: 1767–1780

Cynthia Lenige, also known as Kynke Lenige (6 November 1755 – 3 October 1780), was a Frisian poet. She died young, and her body of work is limited mostly to occasional poetry, though she also wrote a few satirical poems which argued for a classical education.

== Life and work ==
Lenige was born in Makkum, in 1755, the daughter of poet and merchant Dirk Lenige and Akke Rymersma; she had one sister and two brothers, and the family were Mennonites. Due to frail health she never attended school, but was taught at home, first by her father and then by Teake Dooitzens, a teacher who ran a local school. She was taught to write in Dutch and was never taught Latin. She never married, and thus had ample opportunity to educate herself, and to read and write in a room of her own.

Under the influence of her father she began writing poetry at an early age, and her earliest work consisted of occasional poems for birthdays, births, and marriages. Her collection of poetry also included a number of satirical poems, in which Lenige, who herself never enjoyed a classical education, participated in a then-current debate about the appropriateness of using the classics in contemporary literature. She argued for it, defending, for instance, the practice of Joost van den Vondel. She was a member of Makkum's "Konst voedt 's menschen geluk", a society of poets. She was in touch with poets in other parts of the Netherlands, including, likely, Willem Bilderdijk; that he had been in love with her is most likely a myth. Her work does show she was influenced by other poets, including Hubert Kornelisz. Poot and Lucretia Wilhelmina van Merken. Lenige died of dysentery at a young age, and her work was published posthumously in 1782, under the title Mengeldichten ("Miscellaneous poetry"). Most of her poems were written in Dutch, but two Frisian language poems of hers survive.

A street in Makkum, the Cynthia Lenigestraat, is named for her. A memorial stone on the south side of Makkum's Doniakerk was raised in her honor.

== Bibliography ==
- Lenige, Dirk [et al.] Lijkzangen ter gedachtenisse van Mejuffer Cynthia Lenige, in het vijfentwintigste jaar haars ouderdoms te Makkum overleeden den derden der Wijnmaand 1780, Amsterdam, 1782
- Lenige, Cynthia Mengeldichten van Cynthia Lenige, Amsterdam, 1782
- Backer, Jan Aukes Ter gedachtenis van mijne vriendin mejuffer Cynthia Lenige, 1782
- Brandt Maas, Gerard Levensschetsen van merkwaardige, meest Vriesche, mannen en vrouwen, Leeuwarden, 1830–1837
