= Louise Schouwenberg =

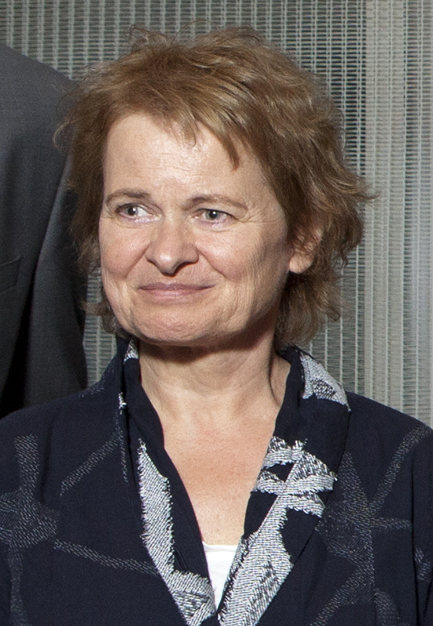
Louise Schouwenberg

Louise Schouwenberg (born 23 January 1954, in Belfeld) studied psychology at the Radboud University Nijmegen, sculpture at the Gerrit Rietveld Academy in Amsterdam, and philosophy at the University of Amsterdam. She worked as a visual artist from 1985 to 2003. Since then her primary focus has been on art and design theory. Schouwenberg is head of the Masters programme Contextual Design at Design Academy Eindhoven (teacher since 2005, head since 2010), and mentor of the Masters programme Inside, Interior Architecture, of the Royal Academy of Arts in The Hague.

Schouwenberg has curated exhibitions on the cutting edge of art and design and has worked as an adviser for many organisations. She regularly writes for international art and design magazines and has contributed to a range of books, some of the latest being the monograph: Hella Jongerius- Misfit, released by Phaidon Press in 2010, a monograph on artist Robert Zandvliet, published by Nai publishers in 2012, and Panorama - Konstantin Grcic, published by Vitra Design Museum in 2014. In 2013 she participated in the re-design of the Delegates’ Lounge of the United Nations Headquarters, as part of a Dutch team, which also consisted of Hella Jongerius, Rem Koolhaas, Irma Boom and Gabriel Lester. The team was commissioned by the Dutch government to create a vision on the re-design of this important space within the U.N. headquarters in New York. In 2015, Hella Jongerius and Schouwenberg wrote Beyond the New, a manifesto about the degradation of the design industry through the singular focus on profit margins, which launched at the 2015 Salone del Mobile in Milan. The manifesto derided contemporary design's obsession with the 'new' at the expense of creating true, cultural innovation. Subsequently, Jongerius and Schouwenberg were invited to create a site-specific installation on the same topic for Die Neue Sammlung - The Design Museum in Munich; the exhibition, also titled Beyond the New, opened in the museum's renowned Paternoster Hall in November 2017.

== See also ==
- Dutch Design
