= Royal Tichelaar Makkum =

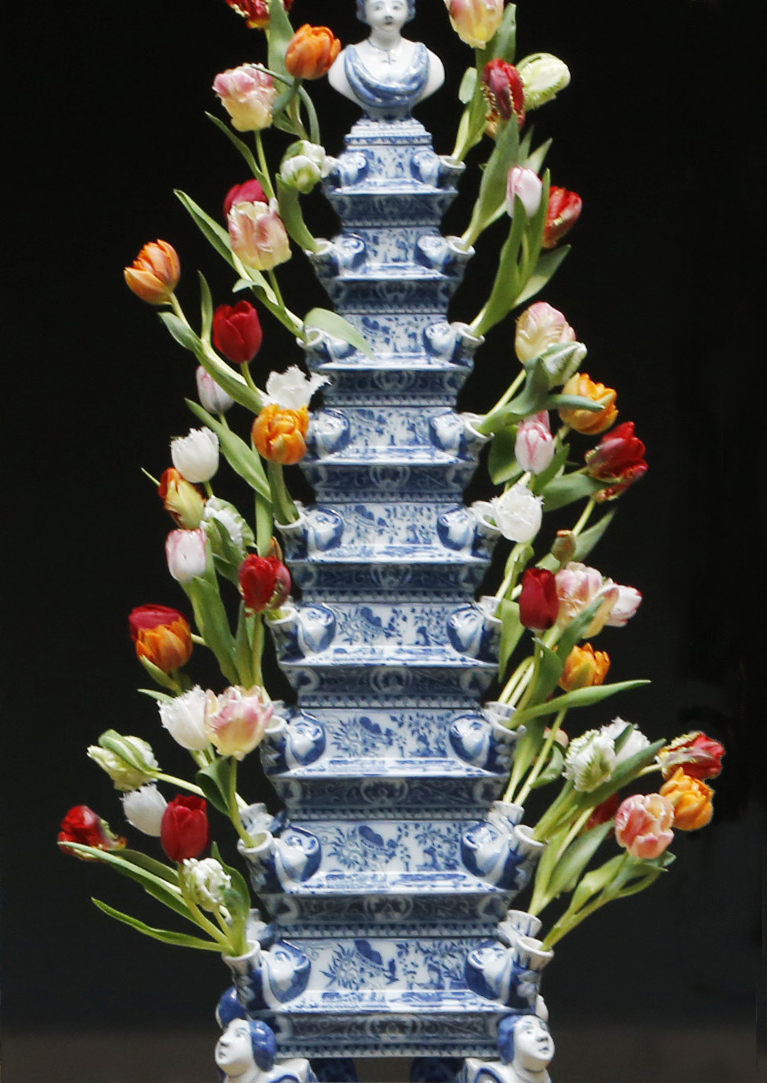
Royal Tichelaar Makkum flower holder (a replica of a pyramid flower-holder made by the Greek A factory. The replica was made in tin-glazed pottery by Royal Tichelaar Makkum).

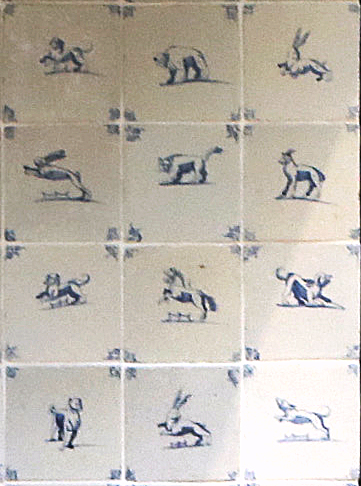
Royal Tichelaar Makkum tiles

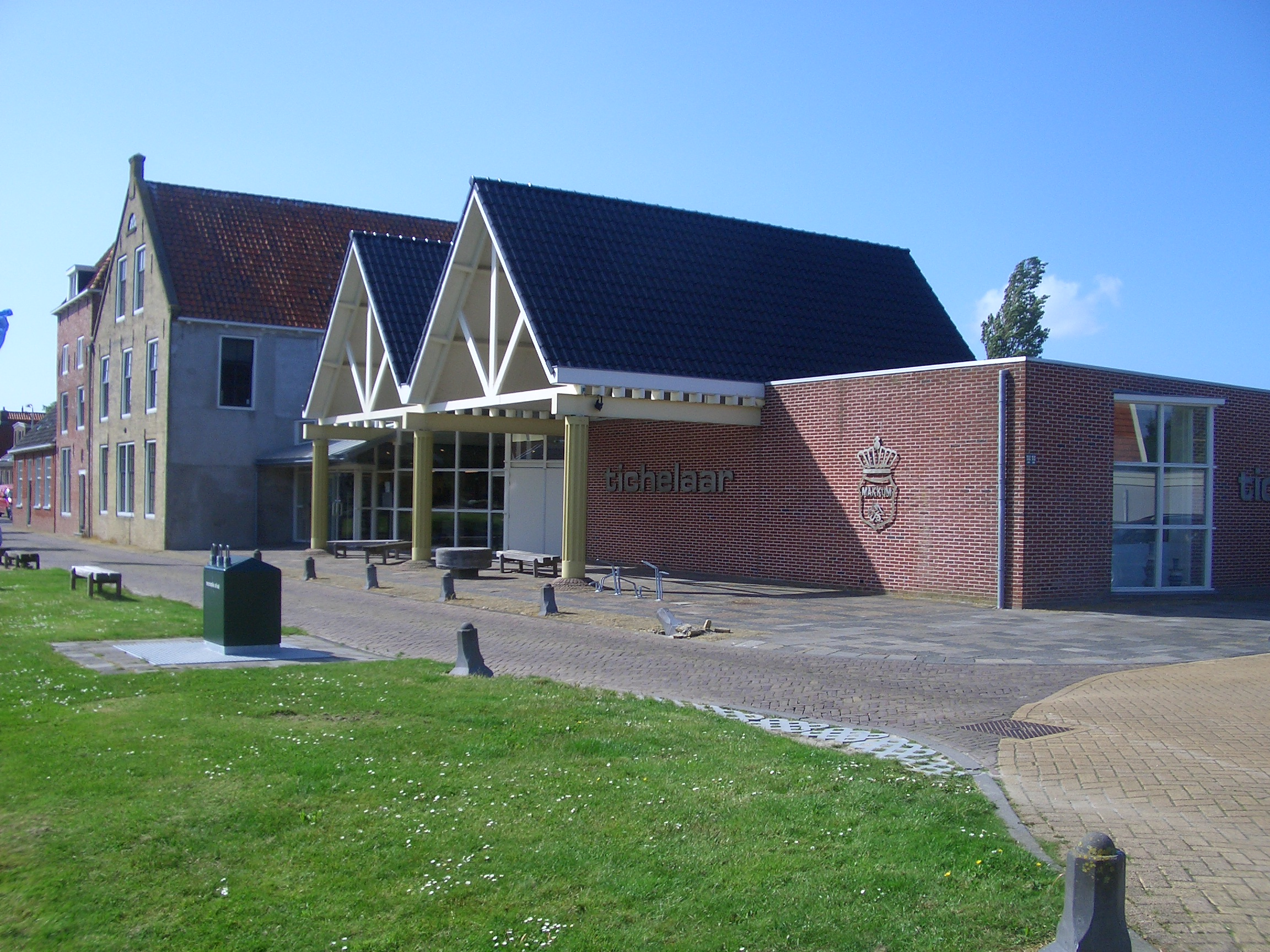
Koninklijke Tichelaar Makkum

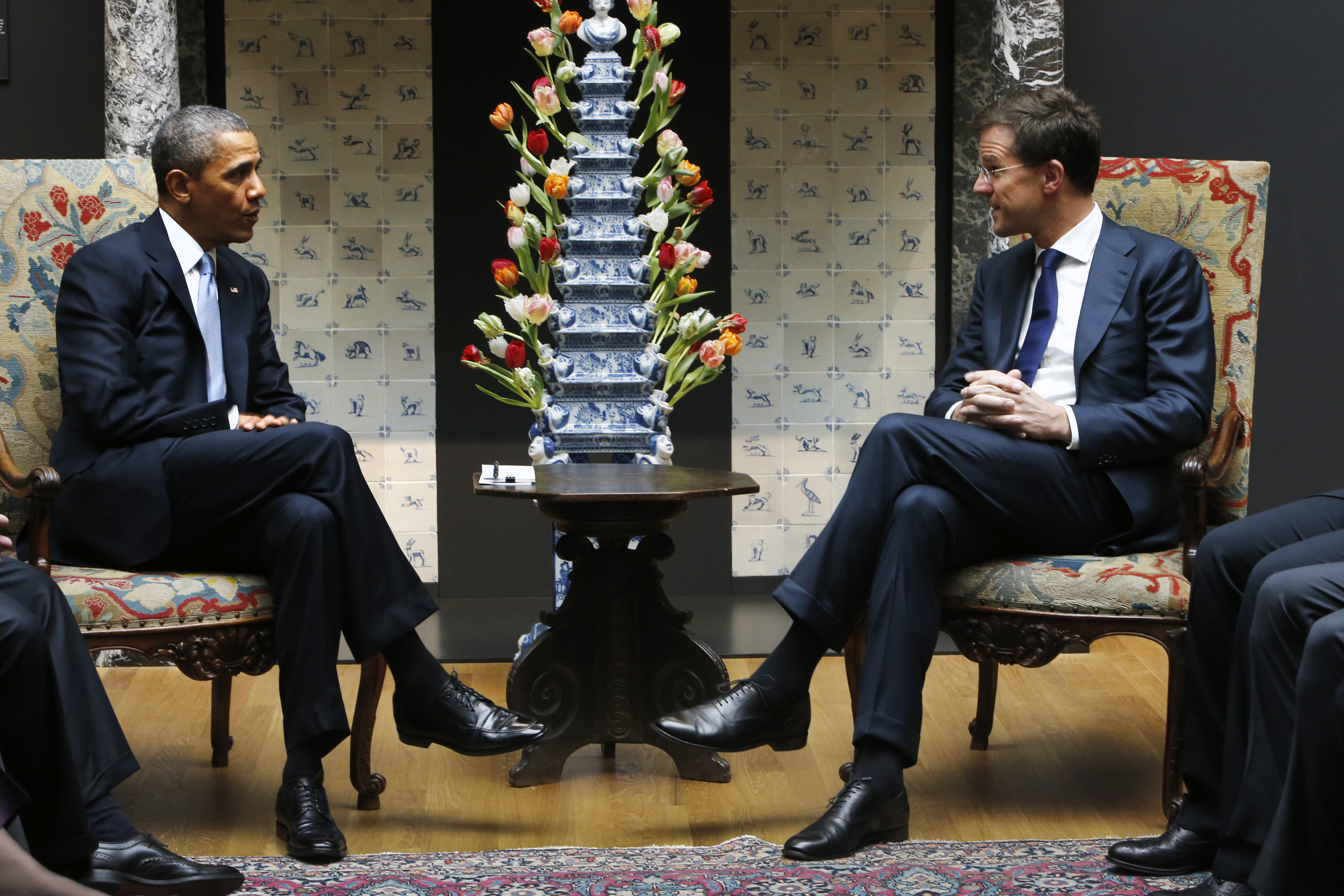
Barack Obama with Mark Rutte during his visit to the Netherlands in 2014 was held in front of a replica of a pyramid flower-holder made by the Greek A factory. The replica was made in tin-glazed pottery by Royal Tichelaar Makkum.

Royal Tichelaar Makkum is a Dutch pottery company in Makkum. After initially producing bricks and later pottery and tiles, the company has focused on traditional decorative pottery since 1890. As the company in Makkum has always made ceramics, Royal Tichelaar Makkum is regarded as one of the oldest companies in the Netherlands. The Royal Tichelaar Makkum has always specialized in stoneware and earthernware, and started making porcelain from 1999. The first Dutch porcelain dates to 1759, with the advent of Weesp porcelain.

== History ==
In 1960, the company received the designation Koninklijk (Royal), on the occasion of its 300th anniversary. Later research showed that the company had been active even earlier and it celebrated its 400th anniversary in 1994, on the basis of the results of historical research. In 2007, documentation was discovered showing that the company was already active in 1572, as a Spanish map of that date shows bricaría (Spanish for brickworks) in Makkum.

In 1689, Freerk Jans brickmaker so tichelaar bought one half of the works, and then in 1694, the other half. Tichelaars who have managed the company through the ages are:

- Pieter Jelmers to 1869
- Jelmer Pieters Tichelaar 1831–1911 (1869–1899)
- Jan Pieters Tichelaar 1835–1919 (1869–1899)
- Pieter Jans Tichelaar 1868–1913 (1900–1913)
- Jan Pieters Tichelaar 1893–1981 (1913–1963)
- Pieter Jan Tichelaar (1963–1985)
- Cees van Zeumeren (1985–1994)
- Jan Tichelaar (1994–present)

During the eighteenth and nineteenth century, it was mainly dishes for daily use and tiles that were made in the clay ovens. Around 1865, the demand for dishes decreased. The brothers Jelmer and Jan started a drastic innovation process, whereby the company could continue as a factory for decorative pottery. Throughout the ages, the company has retained the old working methods, working with locally dug clay that is covered in a white tin glaze after the first firing, called the Majolica technique. In 1882, the use of plaster moulds was introduced, increasing the assortment of decorative pottery.

== Materials and processes ==
The raw material is yellow or red firing sea clay that is abundant in the west of the province of Friesland. Tichelaar bought German clay but also dug his own clay from the neighbouring countryside, leading to the local word 'afgeticheld' to describe a meadow that had been dug up. The clay was mixed with marl in the pottery washing plant and then stored in a cellar to keep it frost-free. Shortly before processing, the clay was thoroughly kneaded and mixed again and then cut to size or punched. After drying, it was fired to biscuit, which was then covered in white on the front. On the back, the dishes got a layer of lead glaze. After the artists had applied their decoration to the lead glaze, they were fired a second time. Two sorts of glaze were used; one transparent and one usually white covering glaze, called lead glaze and white glaze respectively, which were both prepared in the company. For the decoration, coloured glazes were prepared in the company. They were ground to a fine powder and when mixed with water, they could be used for painting. There were five colours (blue, purple, green, yellow and orange), though in practice it was usually blue and purple that were used.

Royal Tichelaar Makkum uses traditional production processes and is often asked to carry out restoration projects on historic Delft blue. The company works with designers such as Hella Jongerius, Jurgen Bey, Alexander van Slobbe and Marcel Wanders. The company is now becoming more diversified, glazing ceramic products, roof tiles and facing bricks on commission from third parties.
