= Richard Quinn (designer) =

Fashion designers from London

- Born: 1990 (age 35–36); London
- Education: Central Saint Martins
- Occupation: Fashion Designer
- Awards: H&M Design Award, Queen Elizabeth II Award

Richard Quinn (born 1990) is a fashion and print designer based in London.

== Early life ==
Born in Lewisham hospital and raised in Eltham south east London, Quinn studied on the BA Fashion Print course at Central Saint Martins graduating in 2014. Richard attended St Mary’s RC Primary school, St Thomas More Catholic Comprehensive in Eltham and Chislehurst and Sidcup Grammar school. Quinn is the youngest of five children to parents Eileen and Patrick Quinn.

Following this he enrolled onto the MA Fashion course at Central Saint Martins where he was awarded the Stella McCartney Scholarship and graduated in February 2016.

== Career ==
In 2016 his graduate collection won the H&M Design Award, including a €50,000 cash prize, and he developed pieces from his winning collection that were later sold in selected H&M stores in Autumn 2017. The collection proved a hit selling out in store and online.

In April 2017 he was named as the British Fashion Council's NEWGEN one-to-watch and was awarded exhibition space in the LFW Designer Showrooms.

Later in the year he was awarded full NEWGEN sponsorship for the following season to enable him to show at London Fashion Week.

On 20 February 2018 Queen Elizabeth II attended Quinn's Autumn/Winter 2018 runway show at London Fashion Week. This marked the first time that the Queen had attended a commercial runway show. After the show finished, Caroline Rush, Chief Executive of the British Fashion Council introduced the Queen who presented Quinn with the inaugural Queen Elizabeth II Award for British Design.

On 7 May 2018 Amal Clooney, wife of actor George Clooney, created a stir when she chose to wear a Quinn design to the Met Gala at New York's Metropolitan Museum of Art, instead of a gown designed by Tom Ford's fashion team, which was the original plan. Clooney's choice helped bring Quinn to the attention of the international fashion world.

Quinn's stockists include Liberty of London, Matches Fashion and Machine A.

In 2021, Royal Salute launched a 21 Year Old whisky designed by Quinn, featuring a floral blend in homage to his colourful designs. The release is the first edition of a new collection celebrating couture fashion.

== Awards ==
- 2018 - British Fashion Award - Emerging Talent Women's Wear at the Fashion Awards.
- 2018 - Queen Elizabeth II Award
- 2017 - H&M Design Award
- 2021 Great Creative Briton - Walpole British Luxury Awards
