= Camiel Fortgens =

Dutch fashion designer

CAMIEL FORTGENS
- Industry: Fashion
- Founded: 2014
- Founder: Camiel Fortgens
- Headquarters: Amsterdam, The Netherlands
- Key people: Camiel Fortgens
- Products: Apparel and accessories
- Website: www.camielfortgens.com

Camiel Fortgens (born 1992, Amsterdam, The Netherlands) is a Dutch fashion designer. He founded his eponymous fashion label in 2014.

== Background ==
Camiel Fortgens graduated at the Design Academy Eindhoven in 2014. With his first clothing collection, he was nominated for the Keep An Eye Grant, this unusual graduation specialization was initially discouraged by his tutors. Shortly after his graduation in 2015, he made his show debut at Amsterdam Fashion Week, the show was an extensive version of his graduation collection. Since then, Fortgens has been presenting its new collections through showrooms and small shows in Amsterdam and Paris.

His clothing is worn by A$AP Rocky, Famke Louise and Pusha T, among others. Although 'he prefers more likely to dress his neighbor' according to Fortgens in an interview with i-D Magazine.

Fortgens wasn't trained as a fashion designer at the Design Academy Eindhoven, therefore his trial and error process became part of his way of working. By questioning the standards within the fashion world and alienating everyday items, the standard for this job will become more visible. As a result garments are imperfect and not completely finished, seams are not stitched straight and items contain small errors.

== Exhibitions ==
- 2019 - ‘’We're in this together’’, group exhibition, Museum Arnhem
- 2015 – ‘’As Is’’, group exhibition, Het Nieuwe Instituut
