= Hella Jongerius =

Dutch industrial designer (born 1963)

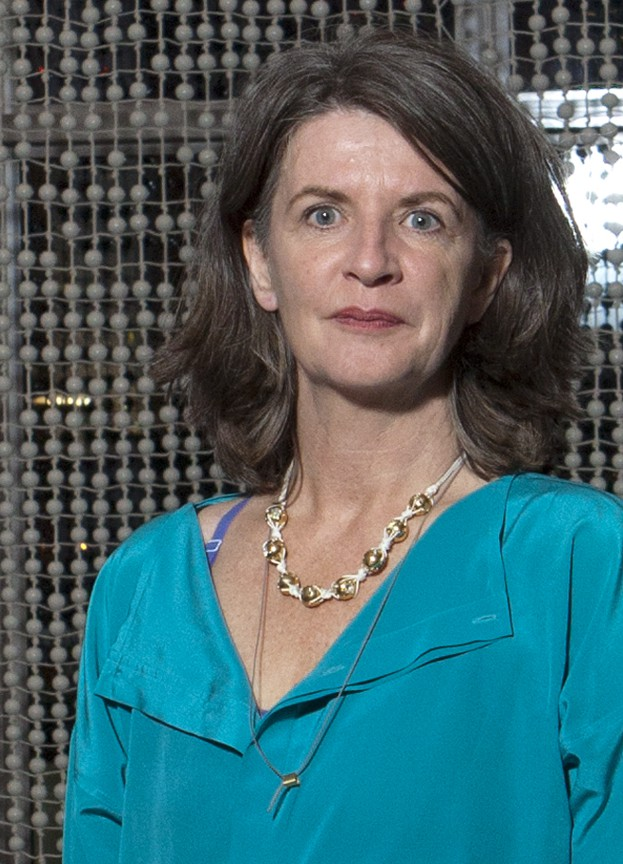
- Jongerius in 2013
- Born: Hella Jongerius; 30 May 1963 (age 63); De Meern (Utrecht), Netherlands
- Education: Design Academy Eindhoven
- Known for: Craft, Industry, Design
- Awards: Rotterdam Design Prize
- Website: jongeriuslab.com

Hella Jongerius (born 30 May 1963 in De Meern, Utrecht) is a Dutch industrial designer.

== Biography ==
Jongerius was born in De Meern, a village to the west of Utrecht in the Netherlands in 1963. From 1988 to 1993, she studied design at the Design Academy Eindhoven. After graduating, she worked for a few projects at Droog Design. She founded her own studio called Jongeriuslab in Rotterdam in 1993. She taught at the Design Academy Eindhoven as head of the department Living/Atelier (1988–1993).

Her clients include Maharam (New York), KLM (Netherlands), Vitra (Switzerland), IKEA (Sweden), Camper (Spain), Nymphenburg (Germany) and, Royal Tichelaar Makkum (Netherlands). Her designs have been exhibited at galleries and museums such as the Cooper Hewitt National Design Museum (New York), MoMA (New York), Stedelijk Museum (Netherlands), Museum Boijmans Van Beuningen (Rotterdam), the Design Museum (London), Galerie kreo (Paris) and Moss Gallery (New York). In 2008 Jongerius moved her studio to Berlin.

== Works ==
Through Jongeriuslab, she produces various collections of textiles, crockery and furniture. Her design focuses on combining opposites; for example, new technology and handmade objects, industrial manufacturing and craftsmanship, and the traditional and the contemporary. Her works are often highly textural; for example, rough edged leather is rolled up to create wheels, paint is splashed on earthenware, ceramics are sewn onto cotton tablecloths, sinks are made of rubber. Jongerius prefers working with textiles so that she can practice her creativity without making a new product from scratch. According to New York Times design critic Alice Rawsthorn, Jongerius' "greatest achievement is bringing sensuality and sophistication to the sanitary industrial design".

In 2012, Jongerius designed a new interior and seats for the business class cabin in KLM's Boeing 747. She is currently continuing on the business and economy class cabins for KLM's 777 and Dreamliner planes. In 2013, together with architect Rem Koolhaas, she redesigned the North Delegates' Lounge at the United Nations Headquarters in New York City. For Nymphenburg Porcelain Manufactory, Jongerius designed the Nymphenburg Sketches, Four Seasons and Animal Bowls.

Jongerius's work Unfoldable Cubes was included in Pirouette: Turning Points in Design, a 2025 exhibition at the Museum of Modern Art.

== Sustainability ==
Jongerius's perspective on sustainability in design is that it should be built to last. She is a proponent of longtermism and is an outspoken critic of ephemeral, low-quality objects — which in her view, should not exist. She has stated, "There's too much shit design" and:

"It's not the design that is the real issue but the amount that is being produced, that is where the evil starts; it just doesn't really add anything to the world."

Jongerius sees longtermism as a solution for the wastefulness of design. She wishes modern designers would follow in the paths of 20th century industrial design greats such as Le Corbusier and Gerrit Rietveld. Jongerius believes that designers are either "merchants" or "pastors". These "merchants" are guilty, in her mind, of producing too much that doesn't last.

"Merchants are the ones who keep the machine spinning for profit without any conscience and pastors are the ones who want to change something in the world and feel responsible."

Theorist Louise Schouwenberg and Jongerius published an opinion piece called Beyond the New: a search for ideals in design about the current state of design and sustainability.

"We are in search for new ideals in design, a holistic approach on all levels."

== Gallery ==
Product designs

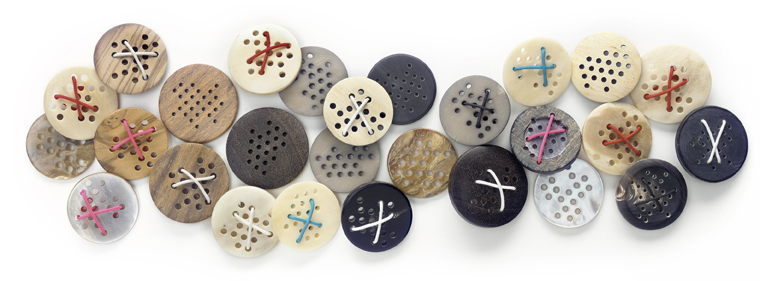
Buttons for the Polder sofa

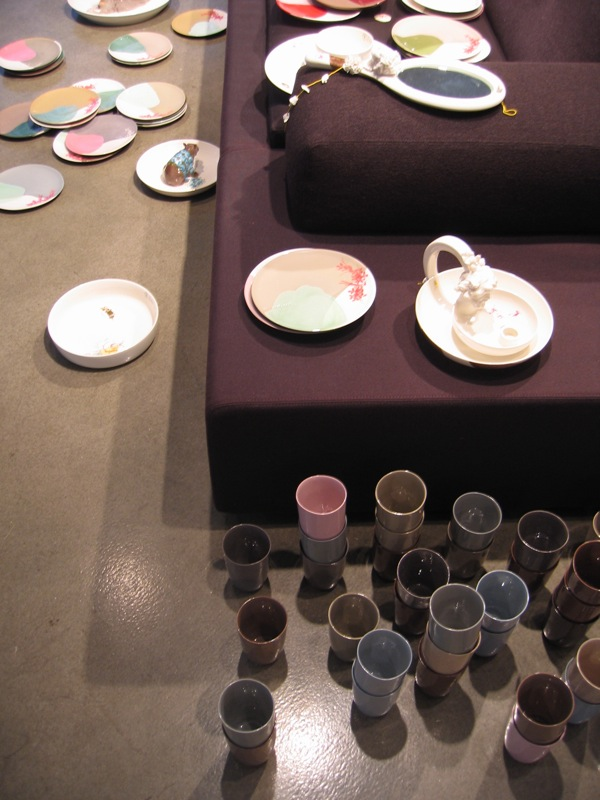
Porcelanas

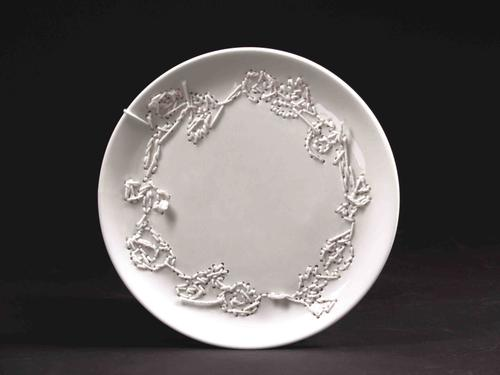
Small embroidered plate, Delfts b-set, 2000

UN Delegates' Lounge New York

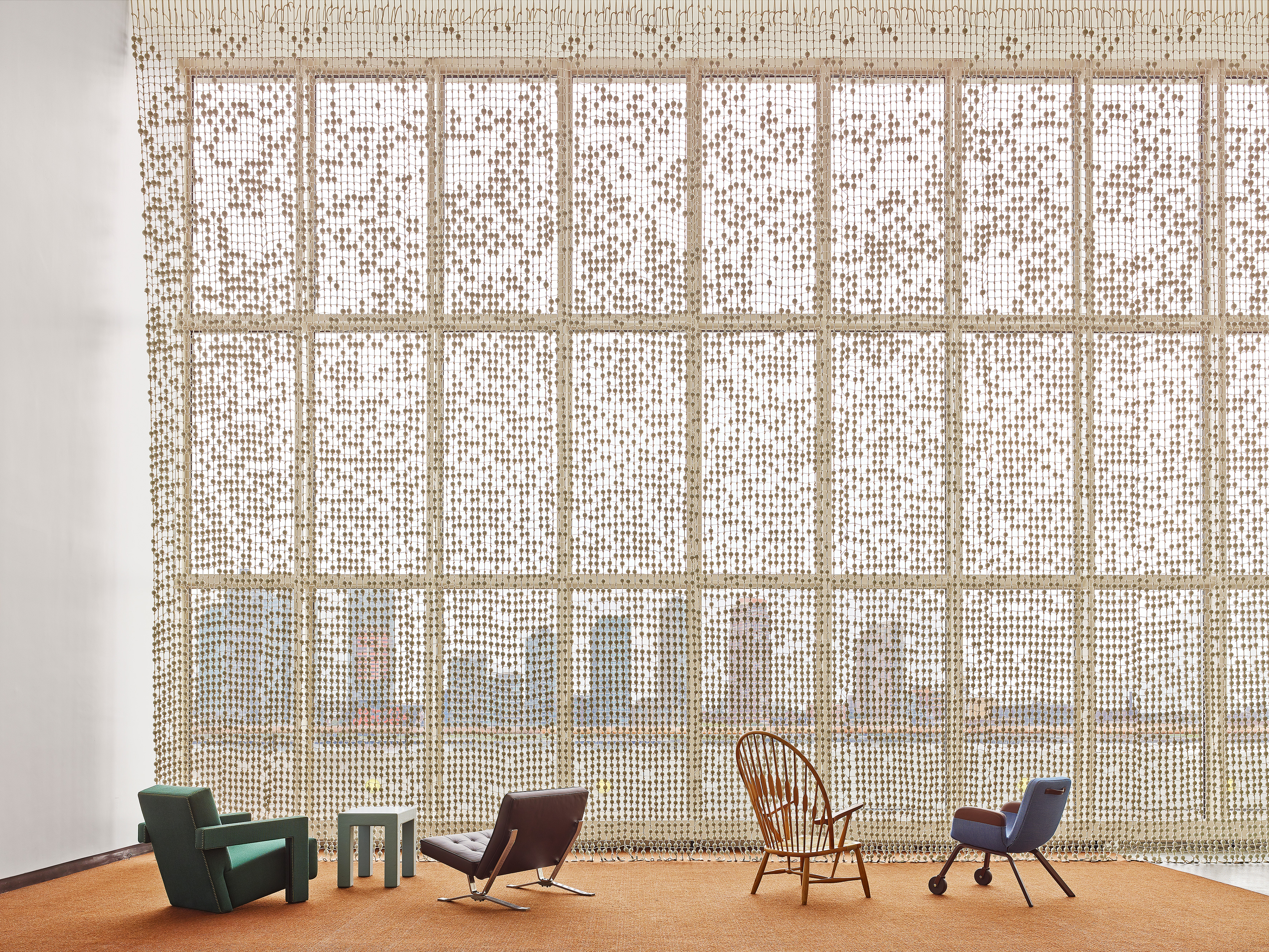

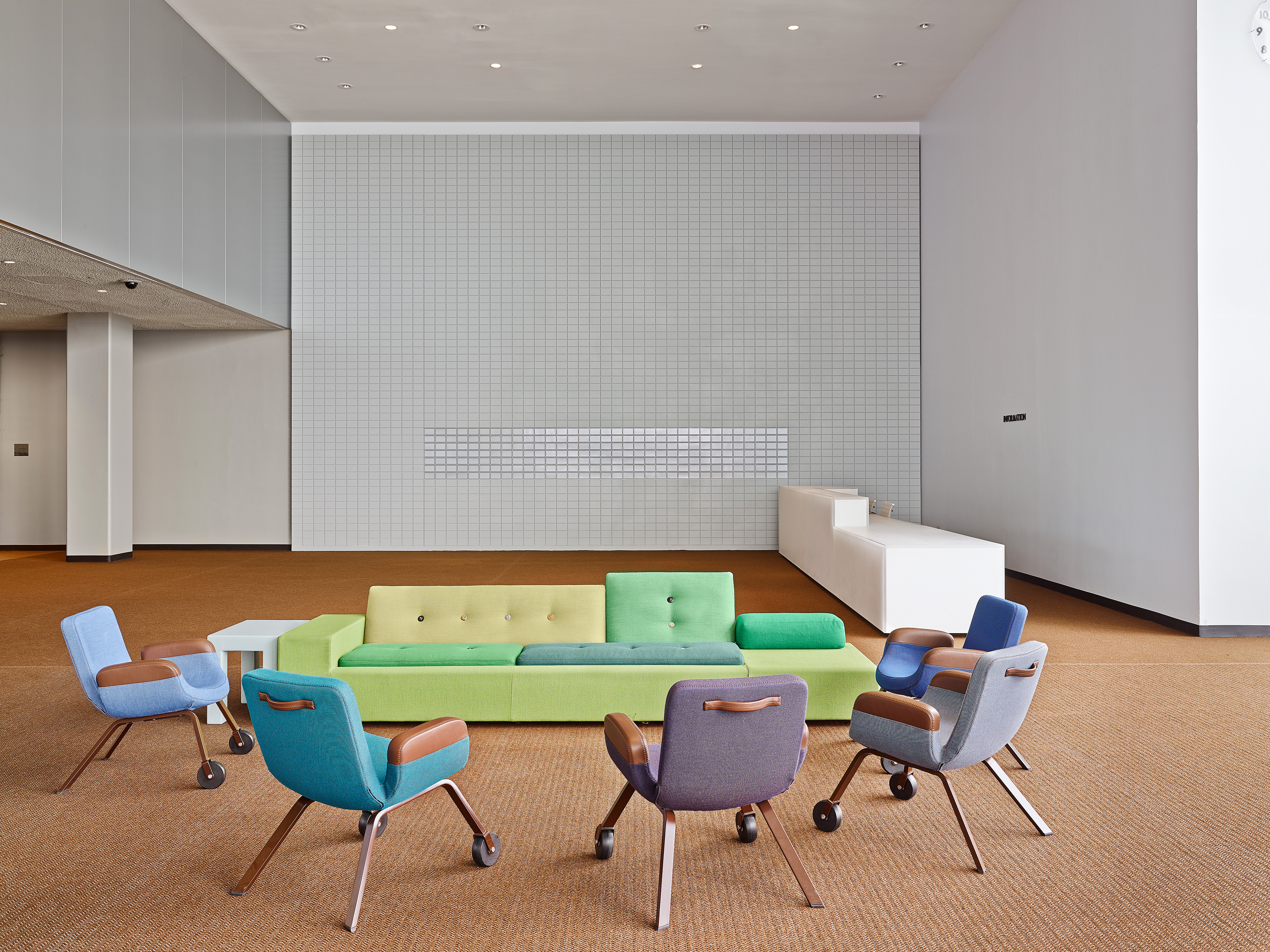

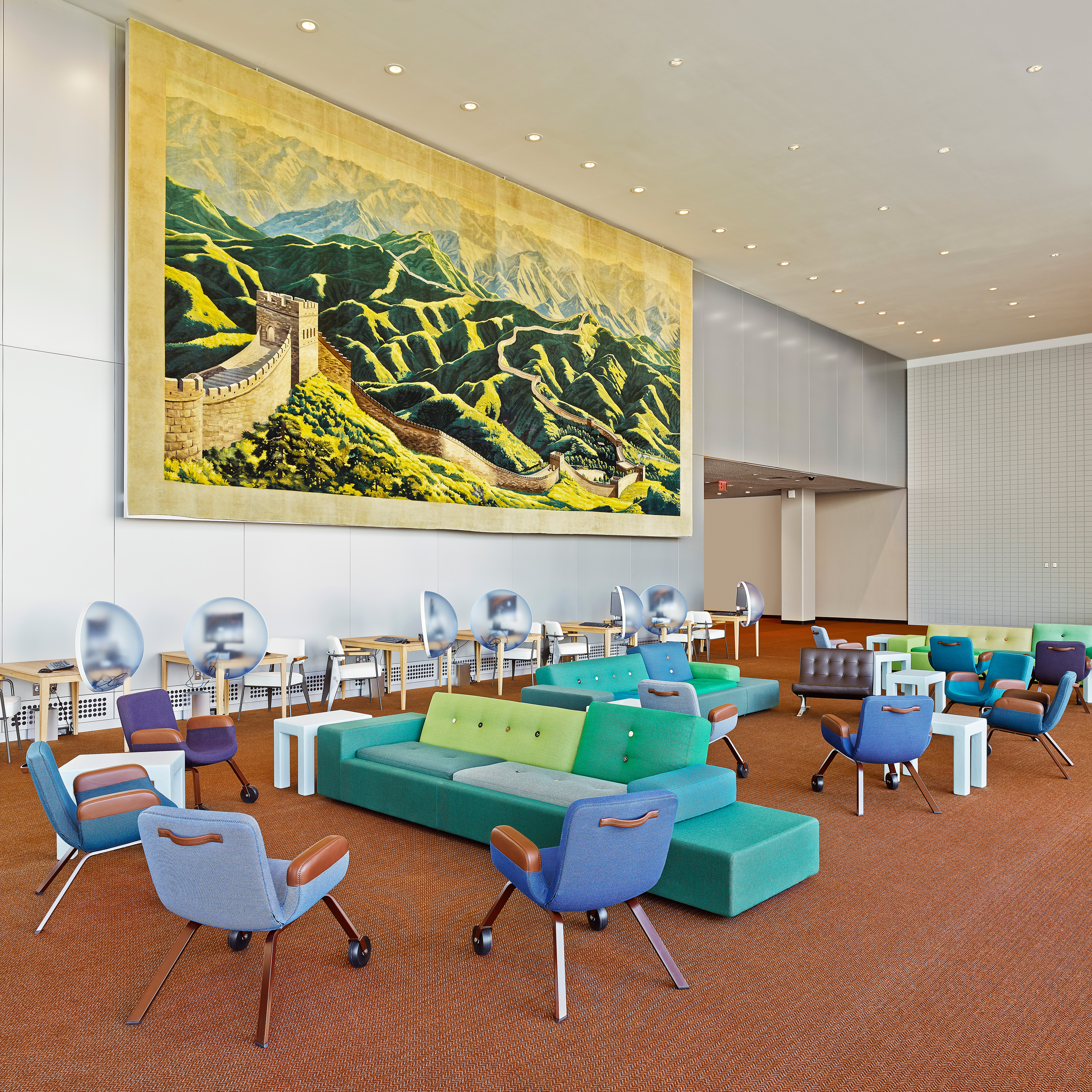

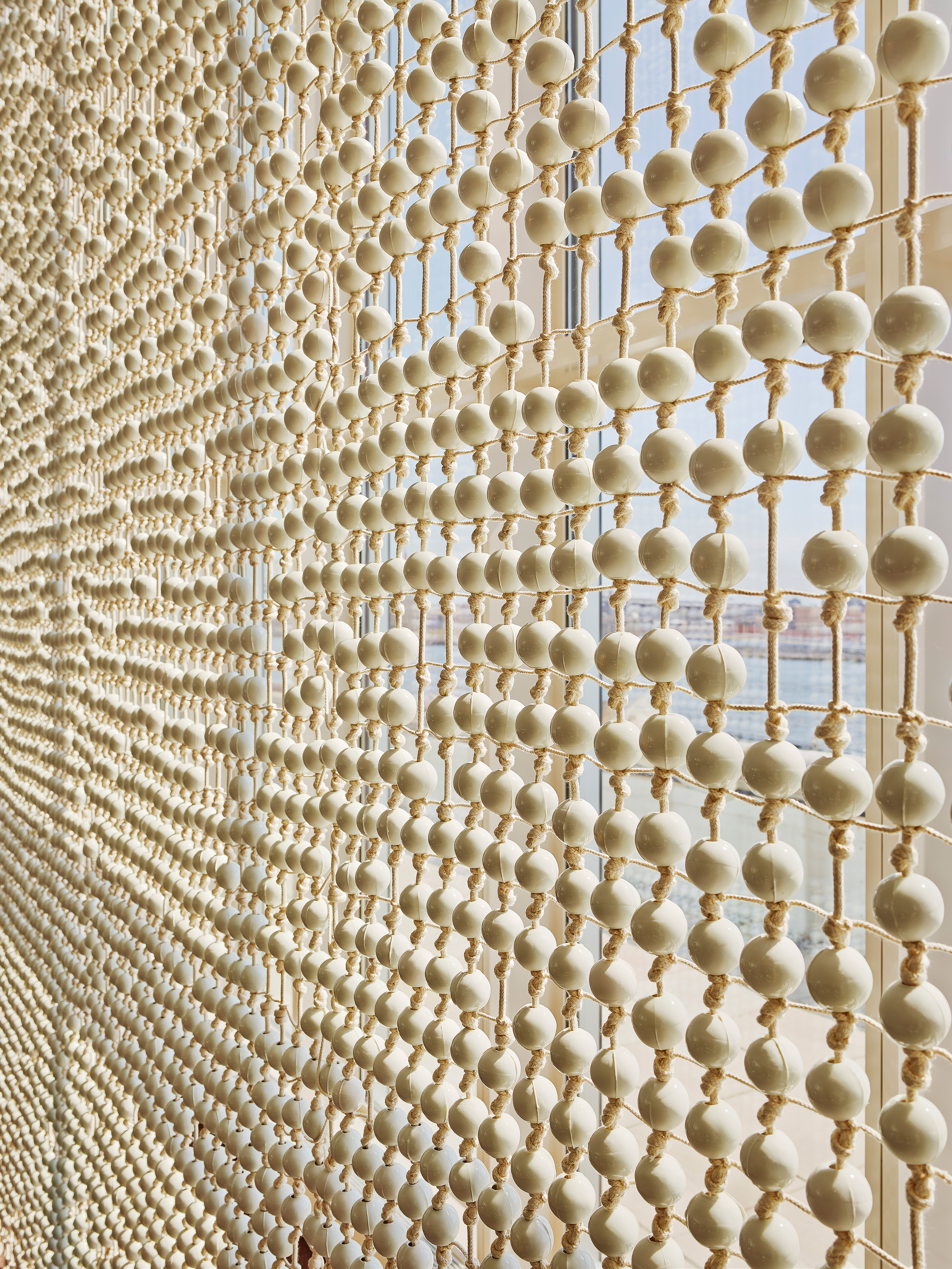

== Publications ==
- 2003, Hella Jongerius; text by Louise Schouwenberg, Phaidon Press
- 2011, Hella Jongerius – Misfit; text by Louise Schouwenberg, Alice Rawsthorn, Paola Antonelli, graphic design by Irma Boom, Phaidon Publisher
- 2015, Beyond the New: a search for ideals in design, opinion by Hella Jongerius and theorist Louise Schouwenberg
- 2016, I Don't Have a Favourite Colour: Creating the Vitra Colour and Material Library, Die Gestalten Verlag Berlin, ISBN 978-3-89955-665-0

== Exhibitions ==
- 1994, participant at the first Droog Design exhibition at the Milan Furniture Fair with Bath Mat at Milan, Italy
- 1995, Mutant Materials in Contemporary Design, The Museum of Modern Art at New York, USA
- 1996, Thresholds in Contemporary Design from the Netherlands, Museum of Contemporary Art at New York, USA
- 1996, Self-Manufacturing Designers exhibition at the Stedelijk Museum at Amsterdam, Netherlands
- 2001, Develops the My Soft Office series of futuristic office furniture for the Workspheres exhibition at the Museum of Modern Art at New York City, United States
- 2002, Skin: Surface and Structure in Contemporary Design, Cooper Hewitt National Design Museum at New York City, United States
- 2003, solo exhibition at the Design Museum at London, UK
- 2005, guest curator for Cooper Hewitt National Design Museum at New York City, United States
- 2005, On The Shelves solo exhibition Hella Jongerius at Villa Noailles at Hyères, France
- 2005, Ideal House at the Internationale Mobelmesse Koln at Cologne, Germany
- 2007, Inside Colours installation for MyHome exhibition at Vitra Design Museum at Weil am Rhein, Germany
- 2010, Hella Jongerius' Special Collectors Artwork: 300 Unique Vases at Royal Tichelaar Makkum, Netherlands
- 2010, Taking a Stance, a representative overview for Dutch DFA at the Dutch Cultural Centre at Shanghai, China
- 2010, Hella Jongerius – Misfit at Museum Boijmans Van Beuningen, Rotterdam, Netherlands
- 2012, Oranienbaum Summer Exhibition at Oranienbaum Place near Berlin, Germany
- 2013, Salone del Mobile at Milan, Italy
- 2013, Design Miami at Basel, Switzerland
- 2013, opening of the United Nations North Delegates' Lounge
- 2017, Design Museum, London
- 2021, Hella Jongerius: Woven Cosmos, Gropius Bau, Berlin
- 2026, Hella Jongerius: Whispering Things, Vitra Design Museum at Weil am Rhein, Germany
