= Fond of Group =

German manufacturing company

Fond of Group Holding GmbH
- Trade name: FOND OF
- Formerly: Fond of Bags
- Type: GmbH
- Industry: Textile industry
- Founded: 2010; 16 years ago
- Founders: Sven-Oliver Pink, Florian Michajlezko, Dr. Oliver Steinki, Juliaan Cazin
- Headquarters: Cologne, Germany
- Area served: Worldwide
- Products: Backpacks, Bags, and shoes
- Number of employees: 300 (2016)
- Website: www.fondof.de

Fond of Group, marketed as FOND OF, is a German manufacturer of sustainable, ergonomic backpacks, minimal shoes, baby products and bikes. The startup company was founded by Sven-Oliver Pink, Florian Michajlezko, Dr. Oliver Steinki and Juliaan Cazin in 2010 and is based in Cologne.

== History ==
Fond of Group Holding GmbH, initially founded as ergobag GmbH, launched its first product in 2010: an ergonomic, sustainable backpack for primary school children called ergobag. In the past years, six additional brands were added to their product portfolio, out of which at least two (Offermann and Salzen) have been discontinued.

By 2024, Fond of Group had five active brands: Affenzahn, ergobag, satch, AEVOR and pinqponq, generating revenues in excess of 120 Mio EUR. This extension in the brand and product portfolio led to a change in company name to Fond of Bags and then to FOND OF as other product categories such as shoes were added. By 2024, it had approximately 300 employees and distributed its products in more than 35 countries worldwide.

== Products ==
The fond of Group portfolio contains five brands:

- Affenzahn
- Ergobag
- Satch
- AEVOR
- pinqponq

All of these individual adaptable products are produced substantially, using Polyethylene terephthalate, i.e. Polyester made of recycled PET bottles.

== Recognition ==
- 2011 Red Dot Design Award
- 2012 Germany Land of Ideas; enable2start Business Plan Competition Winner
- 2013 Red Dot Design Award
- 2015 German Design Award for brand satch; Beste neue Marke for ergobag
- 2016 German Sustainability Award
- 2016 German CSR Award
- 2017 German Entrepreneur Award

== Controversies ==
In August 2021 the German Federal Cartel Office (Bundeskartellamt) imposed a fine of 2 million euros on Fond Of for illegal practices of vertical price fixing. The company was accused to have "restricted the pricing of school bags and school backpacks sold by retailers cooperating with the company" according to the authority.
