= Alexander van Slobbe =

Dutch fashion designer

- Born: 25 March 1959 (age 65); Schiedam, Netherlands
- Education: Arnhem Academy of Art and Design, Arnhem
- Labels: Hacked By, Van Slobbe Van Benthum; Orson + Bodil; So; Orson & Bodil
- Awards: Elle Style Awards, Prins Bernhard Cultuurfonds, Emmy van Leersum Prize, Theo Limperg - Prize
- Website: alexandervanslobbe.com

Alexander van Slobbe (born March 25, 1959, Schiedam) is a Dutch fashion designer.

== Background ==
Alexander van Slobbe attended the Vrije School in Rotterdam and graduated with honors laude in 1984 from the Arnhem Academy of Art and Design. After working for clothing companies, Van Slobbe founded the label called Orson & Bodil in 1989. Bodil is the name of his niece, Orson is a reference to Orson Welles. The label was characterized by experiments in presentation and questioned fashion itself as a phenomenon.

This label was followed up in 1992 by the more commercial men's brand So. This brand flipped both casual and formal work clothes. A first show in Paris was held in 1994. So had in Japan two own collection lines and several stores. In the meantime Orson & Bodil was put on hold in 1995. In 2003 So was sold to the Japanese company Joi'X. With the proceeds he started a new atelier on the Westergasfabriek terrain, there Van Slobbe made a new start his Orson + Bodil label.

In 2014, Van Slobbe announced to launch a new label together with designer Francisco van Benthum called Van Slobbe Van Benthum.

The name of this label was later changed to Hacked By, they want to change the fashion world by 'hacking' its system. Overproduction and residual materials from the clothing industry are treated as new raw materials for their collections. These pre-produced basic items and overstock fabrics are the basis for their collections, also to prevent depreciated stocks from being destroyed.

== Awards ==
- 2004 – Elle Style Awards - Oeuvre prize
- 2003 – Prins Bernhard Cultuurfonds - Oeuvre prize for applied arts
- 1996 – Emmy van Leersum Prize
- 1994 – Theo Limperg - Prize - Best Industrial Design

== Collaborations ==
- Hacked By_ x Schepers Bosman (2020)
- Hacked By_ x H&M (2019)
- Royal Tichelaar Makkum - Pearls of Makkum (2011)
- Puma Rudolf Dassler x Alexander van Slobbe (2003)

== Exhibitions (selection) ==
- 2010 – Stof tot nadenken, solo exhibition, Centraal Museum, Utrecht, Netherlands

== Bibliography ==
- Alexander Van Slobbe, And... And... And, John De Greef, Guus Beumer, Alexander van Slobbe, Jop van Bennekom, 2010
- Alexander Van Slobbe, Nanda van den Berg, 2008
