= Alfred Radley =

British businessman (1924–2019)

Alfred Radley (28 June 1924 – 14 February 2019) was a British clothing manufacturer best known for founding Radley Fashions and his association with the Quorum Boutique and fashion designer, Ossie Clark.

== Biography ==
Alfred Radley was born in 1924 in the East End of London, the youngest of seven children. His father died when he was eighteen months old, and he was brought up partly at the Norwood orphanage.

During the Second World War he volunteered for the Navy and served in all theatres of war from the Atlantic Convoys to the Pacific. In June 1944, D day +1, he served on a ship landing troops on the beaches in Normandy and was on the first Allied ship to dock in France (Cherbourg). Towards the end of the war, he served on RMS Monoway taking returning Russian prisoners to Odessa and bringing back Jewish survivors (among them Otto Frank, the father of Anne Frank) from the death camps to Marseille. He also was on one to the first ships to enter Japan following the dropping of the atom bombs when he visited Hiroshima.

After the war, he started his own company selling dresses and by the early 1960s was part of the Swinging London movement, specialising in party dresses. By 1965 Radley was one of the most important fashion houses in London, with its own fabric mills as well as factories producing gloves and handbags for many high street stores including Marks & Spencer.

In 1968 Radley acquired Quorum with its famous designers Ossie Clark, Alice Pollock and Celia Birtwell. While Ossie Clark flourished under the Quorum label, Radley promoted the careers of many designers including: Betty Jackson, Sheilagh Brown, Sheridan Barnett, Wendy Dagworthy, Rosemary Bradford and Terence Nolder (who in 1980 won the British Eveningwear Designer Award and The British Designer of the Year Award in 1981)

For this, he has been given the epithet "the patron saint of British Fashion" Sir Philip Green.

Radley remained in contact with Ossie Clark throughout the rest of his life. Although Radley retired in the late 1980s, he has retained a passionate interest in fashion and in particular Ossie Clark and has worked tirelessly to keep his work and memory alive. In 2002, he convinced the Victoria & Albert Museum to stage a major exhibition in celebration of Ossie Clark's work which was mounted in July 2003 for ten months. Radley provided many of the garments that were on display from his personal collection and the centrepiece was his daughter Diane's wedding dress.

Radley died at the age of 94 on 14 February 2019.
