= Sheridan Barnett =

British fashion designer (born 1951)

- Born: 1951 (age 74–75); Bradford, England
- Occupation: Fashion designer
- Notable credit: Dress of the Year (1983)

Sheridan Barnett (born 1951) is a British former fashion designer who worked with London boutique Quorum and launched the brand Barnett and Brown with Sheilagh Brown during the late 1970s. He went on to combine own-brand design with freelance work for names such as Jaeger, Norman Hartnell and Reldan, also working as a university academic. Barnett won Bath Museum of Costume's Dress of the Year award in 1983.

== Background and early career ==
Sheridan Barnett was born in Bradford in 1951 and moved to London to study art at Hornsey College of Art and then Chelsea College of Art, completing his studies in 1973. He worked first as a pattern grader with Ossie Clark and Celia Birtwell, then hugely influential designers for the boutique Quorum. By this stage the boutique had been sold by Alice Pollock to Alfred Radley.

== Later career ==
Barnett and Sheilagh Brown began a closer design association with Quorum, designing both under their own names and the Barnett and Brown eponym. Their joint label continued to gain in momentum after Quorum closed in 1975. While the label was critically successful, it would later flounder financially. Speaking in 2009 in a film produced for the Super Contemporary exhibition at London's Design Museum, Brown recalled how the duo had set up shop in South Molton Street opposite Browns adding: "We did the clothes that everybody wanted. If they couldn't afford them – they had giant buttons – they would steal the buttons off the clothes. We were in every fashion magazine; we were the feted couple".

By the early 1980s, Barnett had become an established part of what Brenda Polan and Roger Tredre described as London fashion's "creative renaissance", with a peer group that included Vivienne Westwood, Wendy Dagworthy, BodyMap and Katharine Hamnett He won the Dress of the Year award in 1983 – his linen dress and coat was selected by Observer fashion editor Sally Brampton. An article about London Fashion Week in The New York Times in 1984 singled out Barnett – alongside Jean Muir and Zandra Rhodes – as being of world-class calibre, adding: "Sheridan Barnett blends British understatement and a dash of American sportswear in his unobtrusive designs".

=== Freelance work ===
Barnett always considered himself a freelance designer and also collaborated with more traditional fashion names, including Jaeger and Norman Hartnell. His collaboration with Hartnell – working alongside the designers Victor Edelstein and Allahn McCrae – was greeted enthusiastically by The New York Times in 1986. "The tailored day clothes by Mr. Barnett are the most impressive, carrying some of the slickness of Italian workmanship in well-made coats and suits." In the 1990s, Barnett worked with Marks & Spencer fashion supplier Claremont.

Alongside his design work, Barnett worked as a tutor at Central Saint Martins, where his students included John Galliano. During his early design career, he also employed Galiano's successor at Christian Dior Bill Gaytten.
