= Marc Worth =

British businessman (1961–2023)

- Born: March 1961; Nottingham, England
- Died: 13 January 2023 (aged 61)
- Occupation: Businessman
- Spouse: Kelly
- Children: 4

Marcus Daniel Worth (March 1961 – 13 January 2023) was a British businessman. He was the co-founder of Worth Global Style Network, a fashion trend-forecaster, and Stylus.

== Early life ==
Marcus Daniel Worth was born in March 1961, in Nottingham, England. He has an elder brother, Julian Worth. He received three O Levels and left school at the age of sixteen.

== Career ==
Worth started his career by working for the family business, Heat-Seal Textiles, with his brother Julian.

With his brother Julian, Worth was the co-founder of World Global Style Network, a fashion trend-forecaster, in 1997. WGSN quickly grew into a global player with hundreds of staff situated in offices around the world. They sold it to Emap for £140 million in 2005.

Worth acquired the fashion label Ossie Clark in 2007. He launched a new collection at the 2008 London Fashion Week, but sold it eighteen months later, after losing £4 million.

Worth wrote articles for Forbes.

In 2009, Worth launched Stylus, an innovation research and advisory firm.

== Philanthropy ==
Worth was the chairman of the British-Israel Chamber of Commerce. He was on the board of UK Israel Business, and on the board of governors of the Shenkar College of Engineering and Design in Ramat Gan, Israel.

With his wife, Worth made charitable contributions to the Hampstead Theatre. They have also donated to the Conservative Party, including to the MPs Mike Freer, Richard Harrington and Michael Gove.

== Personal life and death ==
Worth met his wife Hilda when she was nineteen years old. She serves as co-Chair of the Jewish Women's Aid, a Jewish non-profit organisation which tackles domestic violence, and Deputy Chairman of the Conservative Friends of Israel. They had four children, Patti, Max, Henry and Louis. They attended the Hampstead Synagogue. They resided in Hampstead Garden Suburb, north London, and had a home in Herzliya, Israel.

Worth was married twice. With his first wife, Hilda, he had four children and three grandchildren. He is survived by his children Patti, Max, Henry and Louis as well as his second wife, Kelly, and her three children, Annabelle, Max and Sophie.

Worth died from a heart attack on 13 January 2023, at the age of 61.
