= Gandys =

Gandys is a social enterprise and clothing brand founded in 2012 in Brixton, London. The company was founded by 2004 Indian Ocean Tsunami survivors Rob and Paul Forkan. Through the sale of their clothing and accessories, Gandys fund the Gandys Foundation, which works to build campuses & provide education for disadvantaged and underprivileged children in underdeveloped nations.

== History ==
Gandys was launched in 2012 as a flip-flop brand, operating from Rob's flat in Brixton. The products were stocked in over 400 stores, which included Selfridges and Topman. In 2013, they won an award for accessories and footwear design at the WGSN Global Fashion Awards.

In 2014, Rob and Paul published their book, Tsunami Kids, detailing their early life and journey starting their business. 10% of all proceeds of the book are also donated to the Gandys Foundation.

The Gandys brothers have had a number of high-profile collaborations, including Liberty of London, McLaren and The Rolling Stones. Their clothing has been seen on a number of high-profile celebrities, including Prince William, Richard Branson and Jessie J. Their range has since expanded from flip-flops into bags, accessories and clothing.

== Operations ==
Their headquarters are based in Wimbledon, West London, and operate from their website www.gandyslondon.com and their flagship store in Covent Garden, Central London.
