= Advanced Fashion Design and Technology =

Fashion-related manufacturing process

Advanced Fashion Design, AFD, refers to both the design and the manufacturing processes. The inclusion of both processes allows for this technology to be classified as "advanced." It utilizes Computer-aided design, CAD, to pattern-make and design. The first CAD package for clothing came out in 1985 and helped to significantly decrease inefficiencies in making and readjusting panel patterns. Since 1985, software packages containing computer clothing design have made tremendous advancements. Listed below are the functions of the CAD package:

== Main functions ==
=== Draping ===
Drapery is a general word referring to cloths or textiles (Old French draperie, from Late Latin drappus). It may refer to cloth used for decorative purposes – such as around windows – or to the trade of retailing cloth, originally mostly for clothing, formerly conducted by drapers.

=== Pattern grading ===
Pattern grading is the process of turning base size or sample size patterns into additional sizes using a size specification sheet or grading increments. This can be done manually or digitally using computerized pattern drafting software.

=== Fashion illustration ===
Fashion illustration is the art of communicating fashion ideas in a visual form through the use of drawing tools or design-based software programs. It is mainly used by fashion designers to brainstorm their ideas on paper or digitally. Fashion illustration plays a major role in design - it enables designers to preview garment ideas before they are converted to patterns and physically manufactured.

=== Fashion forecasting ===
Fashion forecasting aims to predict the moods of society and consumers, along with their behavior and buying habits and bases what they may release in the coming future off of the forecast. Fashion trends tend to repeat themselves every 20 years, and fashion forecasting predicts what other trends might begin with the rotation of fashion as well. Fashion forecasting began in France during the reign of Louis XIV. It started as a way of communicating about fashion and slowly transformed into a means to get ahead of the times in the fashion industry.

=== Embellishment ===
In sewing and crafts, an embellishment is anything that adds design interest to the piece.

Embellishments allow individuals to express their personal style and identity. Clothing can be a form of self-expression, and the choice of embellishments can communicate one's personality, taste, and cultural background.

== Technical Design ==
Another way that technology has contributed to the fashion industry is in the manufacturing process. Many garments today are produced through outsourcing to other countries. Tech Packs are one way to efficiently and effectively produce these products. Tech Packs contain 9 pages of information that help the manufacturer communicate with the designer. Listed below is the order of the pages:

A summary page with a drawn example of the garment
Usually using Adobe Illustrator
Construction details
In-depth details of different pieces to the garment
Dimensions
In-depth measurements of a garment
Order of Operation
In this case, the order of operations is the order of construction
Component
The component section is a list of the different pieces/trims involved
Cost Section
Cost and quantity of materials
Label Section
Includes illustrations and descriptions of tags/labels on the garment
Shipping
The manner in which the product is packaged and shipped
History
In this case, refers to any changes prior to finishing

== Designing Software ==
Many organizations have started offering customization software including apparel design, suit design, t-shirt customization, and much more. This software eases the work of fashion designers and apparel manufacturers.

== Databases ==
The fashion industry has been using databases to aggregate and organize information specific to the industry. Below are some examples of such databases:

=== Mix-and-match ===
The mix-and-match database is a database used in Hong Kong. Traditionally, fashion companies depend on sales associates to make complementary clothing recommendations for customers. The mix-and-match database essentially does the same thing but in a different way. In order to use this database, all clothes in the store have to be tagged with a radio frequency identification (RFID) tag. In addition, each fitting room has to be equipped with a computer monitor. When a customer brings a clothing item with an RFID tag into the fitting room, the computer monitor will identify the garment, and display photographs of complementary items using the database.

=== Fashion library ===
An example of a useful Fashion Library database is the National Institute of Fashion Technology's Virtual Fashion Library (VFL) in India. This database is specifically organized to meet the needs of India's fashion designers. The VFL's most useful tool is its Fashion Image Inventory. The inventory includes three image banks: the Indian fashion museum, the virtual swatch library, and archives of fashion shows The Indian fashion museum contains pictures and videos of Indian costumes and dress throughout various historical periods. The virtual swatch library includes a collection of fabrics from all over India which helps designers select fabrics and patterns made in India. The archives fashion show contains videos of India's top fashion runway shows.

== See also ==
- Clothing industry – Industry encompassing the design, manufacturing, wholesaling and retailing of clothes
