= Ravi Thornton =

British writer (born 1973)

- Born: 1973 (age 52–53); Manchester, United Kingdom
- Occupations: Writer, mentor and managing director
- Writing career
- Period: 1990's – present day
- Website: www.ravithornton.co.uk www.ziggyswish.com

Ravi Thornton (born 1973) is a British writer. She is known for graphic novels and script writing across multiple platforms, and for her interest in the social-impact potential of narrative.

== Notable works ==
Late 1990s – 2010. Thornton wrote several short stories in British urban underground illustration, graffiti, and writing magazine The Illustrated Ape, including The Lion & The Mistress and The Man With His Heart In His C*ck illustrated by Yuko Kondo and Julie Verhoeven respectively.

2010–2012. Thornton wrote her debut graphic short story Raven Squad, illustrated by Perry Van Zandt, followed by graphic short story Day Release illustrated by Leonardo M. Giron. The latter was nominated for Observer/Cape/Comica Graphic Short Story Prize 2012.

2012. Thornton wrote her debut graphic novel The Tale of Brin & Bent and Minno Marylebone, published by Jonathon Cape Random House (UK) and Soft Skull Press (US), illustrated by Andy Hixon. Inspired by a real-life assault on Thornton, reviewers of the book warned about its violent and disturbing content, but praised the quality of the writing and its emotional depth. It went on to win the Annual Broken Frontier Award for Best Debut Book of 2012 and a nomination for the 2012 Bram Stoker Award for horror writing.

The Tale of Brin & Bent and Minno Marylebone is taught at University of Nottingham as part of its BA English Literature, in relation to William Blake, on themes of loneliness, isolation and surrealism. The text has also been utilised in University of Salford as part of its BA Music, to explore jazz as interpretation of abuse and trauma. Scholar David Annwn Jones describes the graphic novel as part of ‘a new interest in the darker resonance of fairytales’ in his Chapter Horror Comics written for the Routledge Companion to Comics 2016.

2012 – 2018. Thornton designed and delivered The HOAX Project, based on the poetry of her younger brother who lived with schizophrenia and killed himself in 2008, comprising HOAX My Lonely Heart, HOAX Psychosis Blues and HOAX Our Right to Hope. The project went on to be the world's first proven study of social-recovery impact of multi-faceted narrative.

2012 – present day. Thornton founded Ziggy's Wish Ltd to develop The HOAX Project and other projects that use applied narrative to support engagement with complex social issues. The company formalised in 2014. Project partners include Clinical Research Network Greater Manchester (2015), Psychosis Research Unit of NHS Mental Health Foundation Trust (2015–17), Centre for Biomedicine, Self and Society, University of Edinburgh (2019-21). The name ‘Ziggy’s Wish’ comes from Thornton's ex-racing rescue greyhound Ziggy (deceased).

2012. Thornton wrote dark stage musical HOAX My Lonely Heart. Developed in collaboration with director Benji Reid and Royal Exchange Theatre, also composer Minute Taker and producer Pippa Frith. It was performed in 2014 in Royal Exchange Theatre, received four-star reviews and toured across the north of England in 2017.

2014. Thornton wrote graphic novel HOAX Psychosis Blues, published by Ziggy’s Wish and illustrated by Bryan Talbot, Rian Hughes, Mark Stafford, Hannah Berry, Julian Hanshaw, Leonardo M. Giron, Karrie Fransman, Rhiana Jade, Ian Jones and Rozi Hathaway. HOAX Psychosis Blues received significant acclaim including Comics in Education Graphic Novel of the Year 2014 (winner), Medicine Unboxed Creative Prize 2014 (shortlisted), British Comic Awards Best Book 2014 (longlisted), and Comica Top Ten British Graphic Novels 2014 (official selection). A second edition was released in 2017.

2015. Thornton wrote storyapp HOAX Our Right to Hope with embedded clinical study, published by Cubus Games, illustrated by Andrew Chiu. Data analysis showed The HOAX Project significantly reduced mental-health stigma, increased mental-health disclosure and increased help-seeking for individuals who experience psychosis. The app won TIC Anoia Technology for Social Purpose award 2018.

HOAX is taught at University of Nottingham as part of its BA English Literature, in relation to Alan Moore, and Dystopian and Gothic Fiction. The project is often cited in humanities studies.

2015. Thornton wrote stage play and film Trials of the Mind, featuring Sasha’s Trial, published and produced by Ziggy's Wish, directed by Trevor MacFarlane and John Grey. The pieces included integrated participatory workshops and were shortlisted for the Clinical Research Impact Health Service Journal Award 2015.

2017. Thornton wrote interactive script iDent as part of the Manchester Museum and Royal Exchange Theatre project Come Closer Memories of Partition to mark the 70th anniversary of the Partition of India. The piece explored how identities can be projected onto populations for manipulative gain, was directed by Amy Hailwood, performed across Manchester and required audience participation. The project went on to win The University of Manchester's Making a Difference Awards for Social Responsibility, for an Outstanding Contribution to Equality, Diversity and Inclusion.

2020. Thornton wrote graphic novel and workshop resource Tailored Treatments: Tales of Research and Care, as part of Wellcome Trust programme Translations and Transformations in Patienthood: Cancer in the Post Genomic Era. Published by Ziggy's Wish, illustrated by Rhiana Jade.

2021. Thornton wrote XYV as part of Hope Mill Theatre short play event Vignettes. A formally experimental piece directed by Amy Hailwood, XYV explores gender power and the future consequence of techno-scientific trends.
