= Fashion merchandising =

Means of marketing fashion

Fashion merchandising can be defined as the planning and promotion of sales by presenting a product to the right market at the proper time, by carrying out organized, skillful advertising, using attractive displays, etc. Merchandising, within fashion retail, refers specifically to the stock planning, management, and control process. Fashion Merchandising is a job that is done world- wide. This position requires well-developed quantitative skills, and natural ability to discover trends, meaning relationships and interrelationships among standard sales and stock figures. In the fashion industry, there are two different merchandising teams: the visual merchandising team, and the fashion merchandising team.

The visual merchandising team are the people in charge of designing the layout, floor plan, and the displays of the store in order to increase sales.

The fashion merchandising team are the people who are involved in the production of fashion designs and distribution of final products to the end consumer. Fashion merchandisers work with designers to ensure that designs will be affordable and desired by the target market. Fashion merchandising involves apparel, accessories, beauty, and housewares. The end goal of fashion merchandising in any of these departments is to earn a profit. Fashion merchandisers' decisions can considerably impact the success of the manufacturer, designer, or retailer for which they work. In essence, they are the backbone of the fashion business, expressing a creative vision into substantial results that drive success. By staying conscious of the latest fashion trends and consumer preferences, merchandising teams make sure that a brand's offerings are not only aesthetically pleasing to their customers, but also commercially viable.

== Background ==
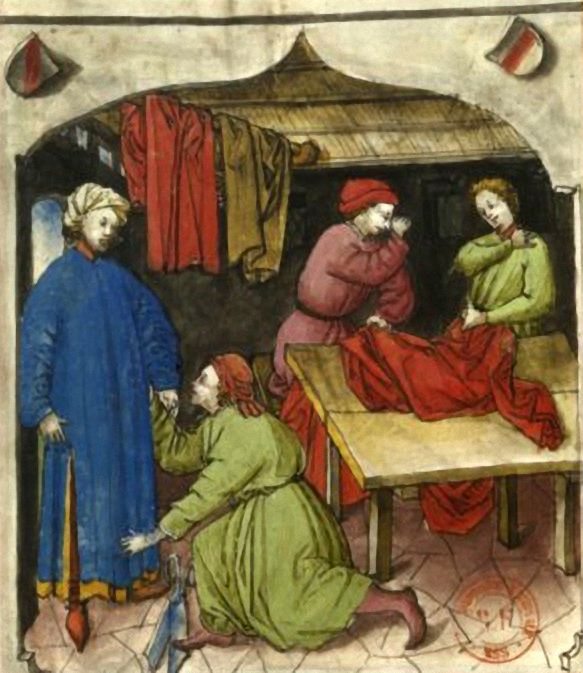

During ancient times, individuals shopped in markets for goods. The ancients were attracted to rare fashions that brought variation and excitement into their lives. These markets have transformed into today's department, specialty, and discount retailers. For many years, businesspeople in the fashion industry were convinced that they could persuade consumers to desire their particular products. Fashion executives had no interest in the needs and wants of consumers. However, fashion personnel realized that they would have to adapt fashion items to the demands of consumers.

== Rights of merchandising ==
In modern merchandising, distribution responsibilities are absent, and focus is placed on planning and analysis. A separate team is tasked with distribution. Large organizations separate merchandisers by type. There are retail merchandisers and product merchandisers. Retail merchandisers manage store allocation and must maximize sales. Product merchandisers manage the flow of materials to suppliers and then the flow of product to stores. Product merchandisers then pass control of product to the retail merchandisers.

Modern Structure

Many large organizations have concluded that distribution requires highly detailed work and that it is necessary to have a team specifically for that purpose. This is due to the fine details of allocation, which require focus on aspects such as colour and sizes for a specific store. This approach not only minimizes costs, but also extends to areas like better control of the overall process. Organizations that do not conduct distribution this way risk losing control of their stock at both the highest and lowest level. This is a result of the lack of uniformity and oversight.

The distribution team specializes not only in managing distribution, but they are also focused on sales and profit. They employ detailed, accurate information about distribution points sourced from product planners. They possess the ability to manage dynamic stock demands. They partner with buyers and merchandisers for any necessary repeat buying. Though they are positioned to manage stock, they still operate within the limits of the buying plan, and merchandisers ensure they remain within this realm. Buyers provide guidelines for distribution, such as the type of stores where product should be distributed; for example, a product may have only been acquired for the top 3 stores. The team also supports the goals of an organization through being instrumental in responding to trends.

The nature of modern analysis has allowed many merchandisers to plan as much as four seasons ahead, and they are expected to apply the data. This further increases the demands placed on their roles and emphasizes the need to task out minor details that do not require their input or much of their supervision.

Fashion merchandisers follow the five rights of merchandising, or 5Rs, to ensure that they properly meet the needs of consumers; thus, turning a profit.

The five rights of merchandising include:

- the right merchandise
- at the right price
- at the right time
- in the right place
- in the right quantities.

By researching and answering the five rights of merchandising, fashion merchandisers can gain an understanding of what products consumers want, when and where they wish to make purchases, and what prices will have the highest demand. Both fashion retailers and manufacturers utilize the 5Rs.

== Manufacturers ==
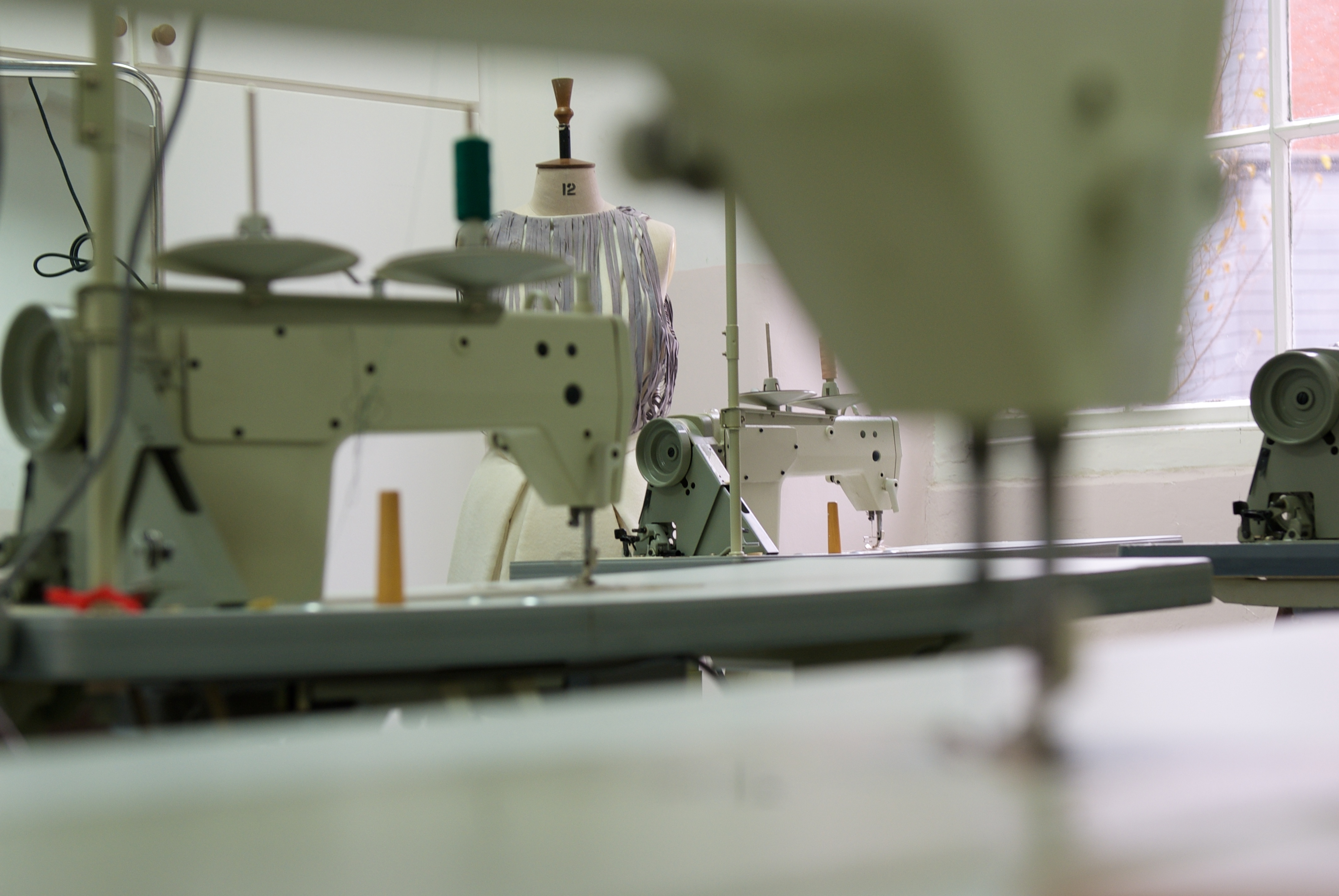

Clothing manufacturers practice fashion merchandising differently than retailers. Manufacturer merchandisers forecast customers' preferences for silhouettes, sizes, colors, quantities, and costs each season. When making decisions, manufacturer merchandisers must keep retailers and end consumers in mind. Following the forecasting stage, manufacturer merchandisers meet with designers to develop products that consumers will purchase most. By referring to the five rights of merchandising, manufacturer merchandisers determine the best fabric, notions, product methods, and promotions for products. These decisions all contribute to final retail costs, which must be affordable to end consumers.

== Retailers ==
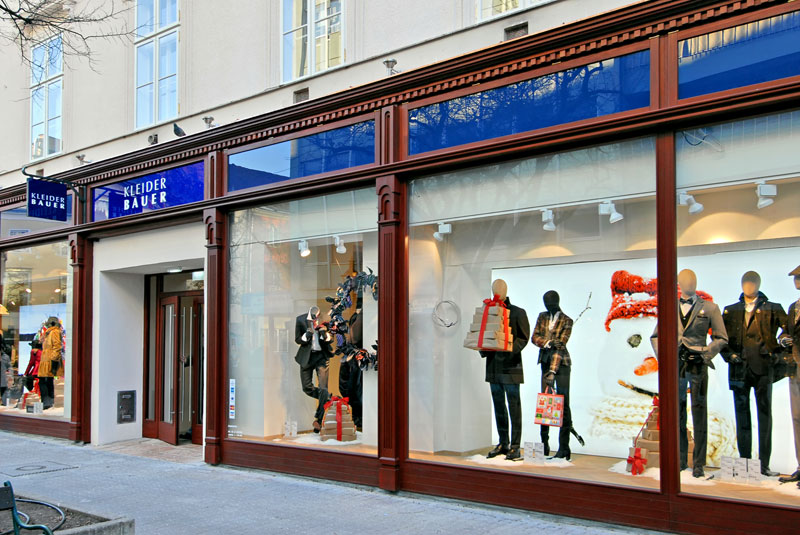
Kleider Bauer Flagship

In comparison to manufacturer merchandisers, retailer merchandisers also begin their process by forecasting industry and fashion trends with their target markets in mind. Sales are predicted in retail dollars and beginning of the month (BOM) stock. Similar to manufacturer merchandisers, retailer merchandisers must make all decisions regarding the final consumer. Decisions are made based on the past, present, and future of the economy, sales, industry and fashion trends, region and world events, and the fashion cycle. When selecting merchandise to offer, retailer merchandisers will consider their target markets' color, style, size, and cost preferences. Once accurate decisions are made, retailer merchandisers will order goods from vendors or produce private labels. Following shipment, ordered seasonal apparel assortments are strategically arranged on sales floors, or visually merchandised.

== Education ==
Individuals interested in building a career in fashion merchandising should earn an associate's or bachelor's degree in fashion merchandising or a related field, such as marketing. Relevant courses include, but are not limited to, fashion, accounting, economics, textile and merchandising, psychology, marketing, and management. In addition to schooling, those aspiring to work as fashion merchandisers are required to do an internship with any retail company of their choice as well as work in the retail field. It is also suggested that one stays caught up in the latest fashion trends, which can be done by reading blogs, magazines, traveling, and shopping. A fashion merchandiser will not only be responsible for choosing the best clothes, but for making the store appealing to the eye. The proper education is very important in order to be successful in this career.

== Careers ==
Fashion merchandising careers are as follows:

- Buyer: Develop six-month buying plans and order assortments for each season. Travel to markets and trade shows to purchase the latest fashions for stores.
- Account executive: The liaison between manufacturers and buyers. Handle several retail accounts, present manufactures' lines to buyers, and relay fashion and promotional information.
- Store manager: Hiring, training, and overseeing employees as well as monitoring sales for a specific retail store.
- Merchandise coordinator: Responsible for visual merchandising. A liaison between the manufacturer and retailer.
- Showroom manager: Display fashion lines, present collections, and manage multiple retail accounts. Also, manage expenses and ensure profitability.
- Merchandise planner: Assist a fashion company with meeting objectives through technologically and mathematically calculated solutions. Additionally, discover trends, develop financial plans, and determine merchandise reorders.
