= Malcolm Hall =

Malcolm Hall may refer to:

- University of the Philippines College of Law (UP Law), a law school in Quezon City, Philippines, housed in a building named for its first dean, George Malcolm
- Malcolm Hall (fashion designer), British designer
