= Arie Lev Gruzman =

Israeli chemist (born 1970)

- אריה גרוזמן
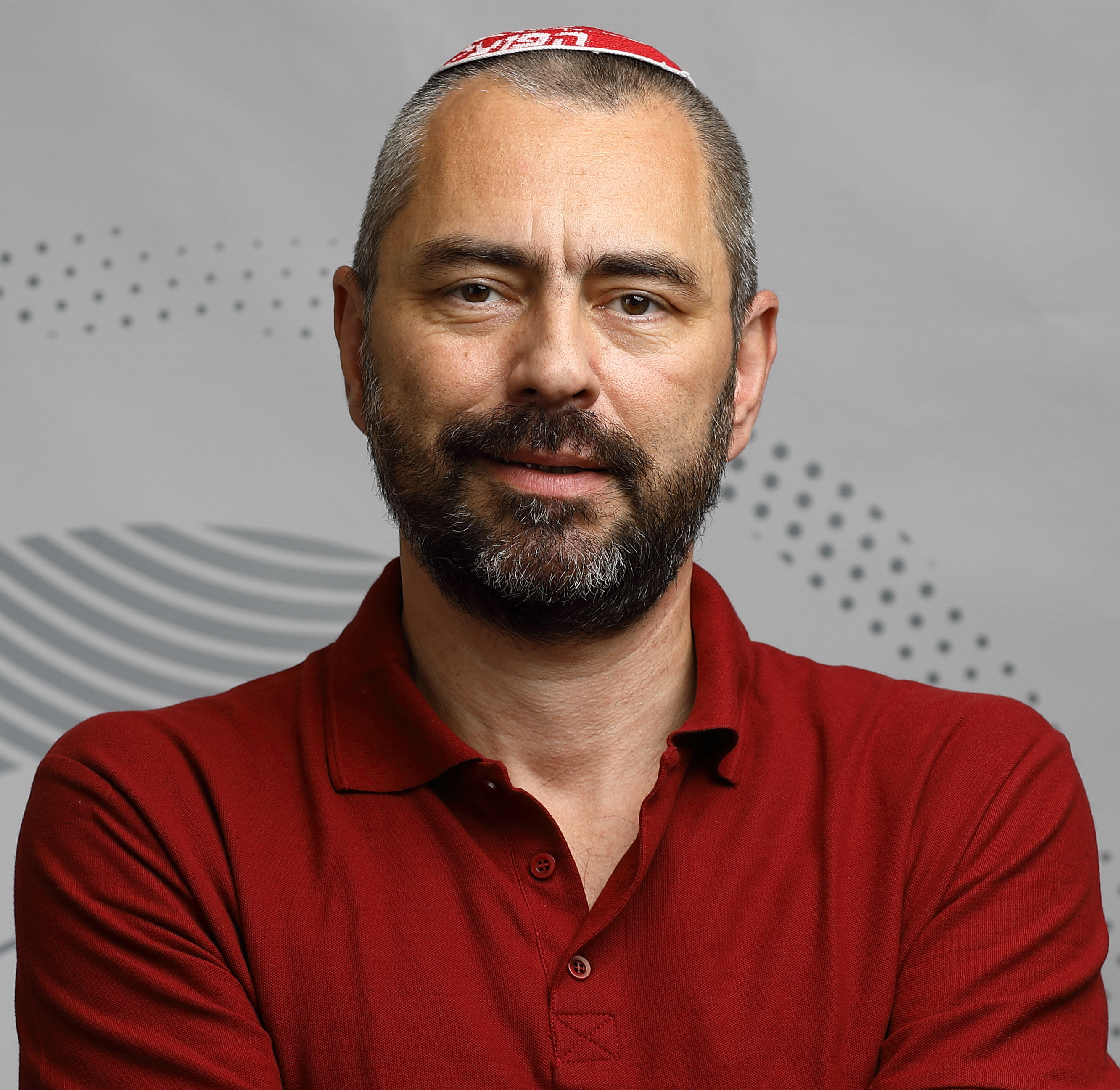
- Born: October 3, 1970; Nizhny Novgorod, Russia
- Citizenship: Israeli
- Education: the Hebrew University of Jerusalem
- Scientific career
- Fields: Medicinal chemistry, Peptidomimetic chemistry, Pharmacology
- Workplaces: Bar Ilan University
- Doctoral advisor: Shlomo Sasson, Jehoshua Katzehendler
- Other academic advisors: Vishvanath Lingappa (California Pacific Medical Center)

Arie Lev Gruzman (Hebrew: אריה גרוזמן; born 3 October 1970) is a professor of chemistry at Bar Ilan University specializing in Medicinal Chemistry.

== Biography ==
Arie Lev Gruzman (1970) was born in Gorky (nowadays Nizhniy Novgorod), Russia. He graduated (1988) from First Gorky Nursing College (Summa cum Laude) as a practical nurse. At the same year, he enrolled at the Pediatric faculty of Gorky Academy for Medicine (nowadays, Privolzhsky Research Medical University). After two and a half years, he interrupted his education towards M.D. and repatriated to Israel in 1991. He obtained his B.Sc. in Medicinal chemistry from Bar-Ilan University (1995) and a Ph.D. (summa cum laude) from the School of Pharmacy, Faculty of Medicine, at the Hebrew University of Jerusalem under the supervision of Prof. Shlomo Sasson and Prof. Jehoshua Katzehendler. After a military service in the IDF, he was a postdoctoral researcher (2004–2007) at the Department of Physiology, University of California, San Francisco School of Medicine (UCSF) and at California Pacific Medical Center (CPMC) at San Francisco, under the supervision of Prof. Vishvanath Lingappa. After returning to Israel, he worked as a head of a project (development of new antidiabetic drug) at Yissum Research Development Company of the Hebrew University. Since 2009 he is a faculty member in the department of chemistry at Bar-Ilan University. Gruzman served as a vice-president of the Medicinal Chemistry Section of the Israel Chemical Society MCS-ICS (2011–2015). He is also one of the founders of the startup drug development company “AltA-ZuZ”.

== Scientific interests and publications ==
His research areas of interest include organic synthesis, medicinal chemistry, peptide chemistry, analytical chemistry, pharmacology, pharmacokinetics studies, in vitro and in vivo drug candidate testing, nanotechnology, molecular computer-aided modeling, and basic biochemistry. His current research focuses on developing of new drugs for the treatment of insulin dependent diabetes mellitus (IDDM, Type 1 diabetes) and non-insulin dependent diabetes mellitus (NIDDM, Type 2 diabetes) type of diabetes. His group, together with collaborators, developed several compounds that have a bi-functional mode of action in NIDDM. Such drug candidates increase the rate of glucose uptake in skeletal muscles and augment the rate of insulin secretion. Gruzman's group also developed new drug candidates against ALS. His chemistry expertise is mainly related to peptide/peptidomimetic chemistry.

Among his awards is Excellence in teaching (2016); “Faculty of 1000 Biology Award” (2007); The Kaye Innovation Awards at the Hebrew University of Jerusalem (2003); Bern-Schlander Research Award, the Diabetes Research Centre of the Hebrew University of Jerusalem (2002). He was elected as Israeli Representative of the Chemistry and Human Health, Division of International Union of Pure and Applied Chemistry (IUPAC) for the term 2022–2023.
