= Mr and Mrs Clark and Percy =

Painting by David Hockney

- Artist: David Hockney
- Year: 1971
- Type: Acrylic on canvas
- Dimensions: 213.4 cm × 305.1 cm (84.0 in × 120.1 in)
- Location: Tate Britain; London

Mr and Mrs Clark and Percy is an acrylic on canvas painting by the British artist David Hockney. Painted between 1970 and 1971, it depicts a couple, the fashion designer Ossie Clark and the textile designer Celia Birtwell in their flat in Notting Hill Gate, shortly after their wedding, with one of the couple's cats on Clark's knee. The white cat depicted in the painting was named Blanche; Percy was another of their cats, but Hockney thought "Percy" made a better title.

== Background ==
The work is part of a series of double portraits made by Hockney from 1968, often portraying his friends. Hockney and Clark had been friends since meeting in Manchester in 1961, and Hockney was Clark's best man at his wedding to Birtwell in 1969. Hockney did preparatory work for the painting from 1969, making drawings and taking photographs. He worked on the painting from early 1970 to early 1971.

== Description ==
The couple are depicted in the bedroom of their flat in Notting Hill Gate, near life size, either side of a tall window with a pair of shutters, one open to reveal the balustrade of a balcony looking out over trees to a Georgian façade beyond. To the left, Birtwell stands in a purple dress with hand on hip; to the right sits Clark in green jumper and trousers, lounging on a modern metal-framed chair with his bare feet in the thick pile of a rug and a cigarette in his left hand, and with a white cat on his lap. Both Birtwell and Clark are looking out at the viewer, drawing them as a third person into the composition. The cat, by the opposite, is ignoring the viewer, looking out of the window instead.

The room is relatively bare and uncluttered, in simple 1960s minimalist style, with a telephone and a lamp on the floor to the right of Clark, and a plain table to the left of Birtwell bearing a vase of lilies and a yellow book. There is a framed print on the wall behind her.

Hockney worked and reworked the portraits many times until he was satisfied, repainting Clark's head perhaps twelve times. He has described the style of the painting as being close to realism, although the surfaces are characteristically abstracted and flattened. Hockney achieves the difficult task of balancing the dark figures "contre-jour", against the light flooding in through the window behind them.

The work is in acrylic on canvas, and measures 213.4 by 304.8 centimetres (84.0 in × 120.0 in) (or 217.0 by 308.4 centimetres (85.4 in × 121.4 in) in its frame). The painting was presented to the Tate Gallery by the friends of the gallery in 1971, and remains in the collection. It featured in the final ten of the Greatest Painting in Britain Vote in 2005, the only work by a living artist to do so.

== Symbolism ==
Hockney drew on both the Arnolfini Portrait by Jan van Eyck and A Rake's Progress by William Hogarth in the symbolism and composition of the painting. A copy of a Hockney etching, showing his own interpretation of A Rake's Progress (1961–63), is on the wall behind Birtwell.

The positions of the two figures are reversed from the Arnolfini Portrait, with the implication that Birtwell is the assertive partner. Hockney's portrait, with the bride standing and the groom sitting, also reverses the convention of traditional wedding portraiture, such as Mr and Mrs Andrews by Thomas Gainsborough. The lilies next to Birtwell, a symbol of female purity, are also associated with depictions of the Annunciation (at the time of the portrait Birtwell was pregnant). The cat "Percy" (slang for penis) sits erect on Clark's crotch. The cat is a symbol of infidelity and envy, echoing the dog (a symbol of fidelity) in the Arnolfini Portrait. In this case, Clark continued to have affairs with men and women, which contributed to the breakdown of the marriage in 1974: Hockney's depiction of the couple together but separated foreshadows their divorce.

The informal interior scene littered with symbolic objects echoes Victorian paintings, such as William Holman Hunt's The Awakening Conscience.
