= UK Israel Business =

Bilateral economic organisation

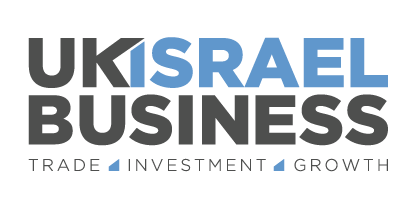
UK Israel Business logo

Founded in 1950 as the Anglo-Israel Chamber of Commerce, UK Israel Business encourages and supports bilateral trade and investment between the UK & Israel. Previously known as the British-Israel Chamber of Commerce, the name UK Israel Business was adopted in 2011 through a merger between the former British-Israel Chamber of Commerce (B-ICC) and Israel Britain Business Council (IBBC).

== Overview ==
The Chairman of UK Israel Business is Danny Kessler and the Chief Executive is Dor Bershadsky. The organisation has a network of over 2000 companies and 10,000 business leaders. and works closely with the Department for International Trade, the British Embassy in Tel Aviv, the Israeli Embassy in London and the UK Israel Tech Hub.

A not for profit, UK Israel Business is a bilateral chamber of commerce. Its goal is to provide a meeting place and platform for business.

== Events and delegations ==
UK Israel Business organises a wide variety of events and delegations in the UK and Israel including conferences, business breakfasts, regional meetings, private roundtable events and business delegations.

=== British Israeli Business Awards Dinner ===
The organisation hosts the annual British Israeli Business Awards Dinner where companies contributing to trade and investment between the two countries are recognised. British Israeli Business Awards Dinner 2018

The dinner was addressed by Dr. Erel N. Margalit, founder of Jerusalem Venture Partners and the following companies and individuals were recognised with awards at the dinner:

- British Company of the Year: London Stock Exchange Group
- Israeli Company of the Year: LABS
- Israeli Listed Company of the Year: Crossrider
- Most Promising Company of the Year: Healthy.io
- Lifetime Achievement Award: Leo Noé

==== British Israeli Business Awards Dinner 2017 ====
The dinner was addressed by Dan Doctoroff, CEO of SideWalk Labs and the following companies and individuals were recognised with awards at the dinner:

- British Company of the Year: Barclays
- Israel Company of the Year: Gett
- Most Promising Company of the Year: Hibob
- Lifetime Achievement Award: Daniel Dover of BDO

==== British Israeli Business Awards Dinner 2015 ====
The dinner was addressed by The Rt. Hon Sajid Javid, who gave his first speech as Business Secretary at the dinner. The following companies and individuals were recognised with awards at the dinner:

- British Company of the Year: easyJet
- Israeli Company of the Year: Orbotech
- Most Promising Company of the Year: Zeek
- Israeli Listed Company of the Year: XL Media plc
- Lifetime Achievement Award: Sir Harry Solomon

==== British Israeli Business Awards Dinner 2014 ====
The dinner was addressed by Israel's then leader of the opposition, Isaac Herzog MK. The following companies and individuals were recognised with awards at the dinner:

- British Company of the Year: Arup
- Israeli Company of the Year: Plus500
- Most Promising Company of the Year: eToro
- Lifetime Achievement Award: Lord Young of Graffham

==== British Israeli Business Awards Dinner 2013 ====
The dinner was addressed by both Professor Stanley Fischer and Lord King of Lothbury, respectively Governors of the Bank of Israel and the Bank of England shortly before their retirements as Governors. The following companies and individuals were recognised with awards at the dinner:

- British Company of the Year: Grovepoint Capital
- Israeli Company of the Year: Ness Technologies
- Lifetime Achievement Award: Isaac Kaye

It also awarded Bunzl and Arad Water Technology as 2011 British-Israeli companies of the year.

=== Briefings ===
UK Israel Business regularly hosts briefings for members and past speakers have included Chemi Peres, Dov Moran, Uri Levine (Waze), Carolyn McCall, Richard Solomons, Gavin Patterson, Ross McEwan, Sir Win Bischoff, Kimbal Musk, Ann Cairns (Mastercard), Xavier Rolet, Jon Medved (OurCrowd), Eugene Kandel, Lord Livingstone of Parkhead, Mark Regev, Daniel Taub, Avi Hasson, Matthew Gould, Michael O'Leary, Willie Walsh, Silvan Shalom, Yosef Abramowitz, Lord Fink, Lloyd Dorfman, the Rt Hon David Willetts MP, Tidjane Thiam, Governor Mervyn King, Sir Victor Blank, Vincent Tchenguiz, Sir Trevor Chinn, Lord Young of Graffham, Sammy Ofer, Shai Agassi, .

=== Summits ===
Summits organised by UK Israel Business have been held in both London and Tel Aviv and focus on specific opportunities between the two countries. Previous summits have included:

- Israel Private Equity Opportunity Summit – March 2014 – focussing on Private Equity Opportunities for British Investors in Israel brought about by the anti-concentration law of 2013. Sponsored by Linklaters, Herzog Fox & Ne'eman and KPMG, speakers at the Summit included: Dan Gillerman and Sir Ronald Cohen and representatives of Apax Partners and the BVCA. The summit received coverage in industry publications including unquote, The Wall Street Journal and eFinancial News
- Israel Investor Summit – February 2015 – provided UK institutional investors with a deeper knowledge of the Israeli economy and a chance to hear from some Israeli companies who listed on the London Stock Exchange in 2014. The event commenced with a market opening ceremony and the Summit was addressed by speakers including Xavier Rolet and Leo Leiderman.
- Brexit Summit Tel Aviv – March 2017 – gathered over 100 Israelis in Tel Aviv to discuss the opportunities and challenges presented by Brexit
- Innovate Israel – September 2017 – featured 17 Israeli scale-up companies, and 150 UK corporates and investors

== See also ==
- Israel–United Kingdom relations
