= WGSN (trend forecasting) =

Trend forecasting company

- Company type: Private
- Founded: 1998; 28 years ago
- Founders: Julian Worth; Marc Worth
- Headquarters: West London, UK
- Owner: Independent (1998–2005); Ascential (2005-24); Apax Partners (2024–present)
- Website: wgsn.com

WGSN is a trend forecasting company with offices in London, New York, Hong Kong and São Paulo. It supplies global brands with consumer and product design forecasts and provides business and marketing consultancy to clients.

== History ==
WGSN was founded in 1998 in West London by brothers Julian and Marc Worth. In October 2005, it was purchased by Emap (now Ascential), a business-to-business publisher and exhibitions company, for £140m.

In 2013, the firm merged with its biggest competitor, Stylesight. Like WGSN, Stylesight had a vast library of fashion forecasting, trend information, archival photos, and even sketches and patterns for designers to use. Keeping the WGSN name, the new product has been designed around the technology developed by Stylesight and launched in 2014.

In November 2017, the company bought Use Fashion (now Start by WGSN), a regional competitor in Brazil, launching its secondary business focused on fashion entrepreneurs.

In 2024, WGSN announced an agreement between Apax Partners, a global private equity advisory firm, and Ascential for the acquisition of WGSN for £700m. The transaction was completed in February of the same year.

== Products ==
As an online service, the business derives its revenues from 9 different product subscriptions (WGSN Insight, WGSN Fashion, WGSN Interiors, WGSN Beauty, WGSN Food & Drink, WGSN Consumer Tech, WGSN Barometer, Coloro, TrendCurve+) and a custom advisory business (WGSN Mindset).

== See also ==
- Coolhunting
- Extrapolation
- Technology forecasting
- Trend Forecasting
