= Minute Taker =

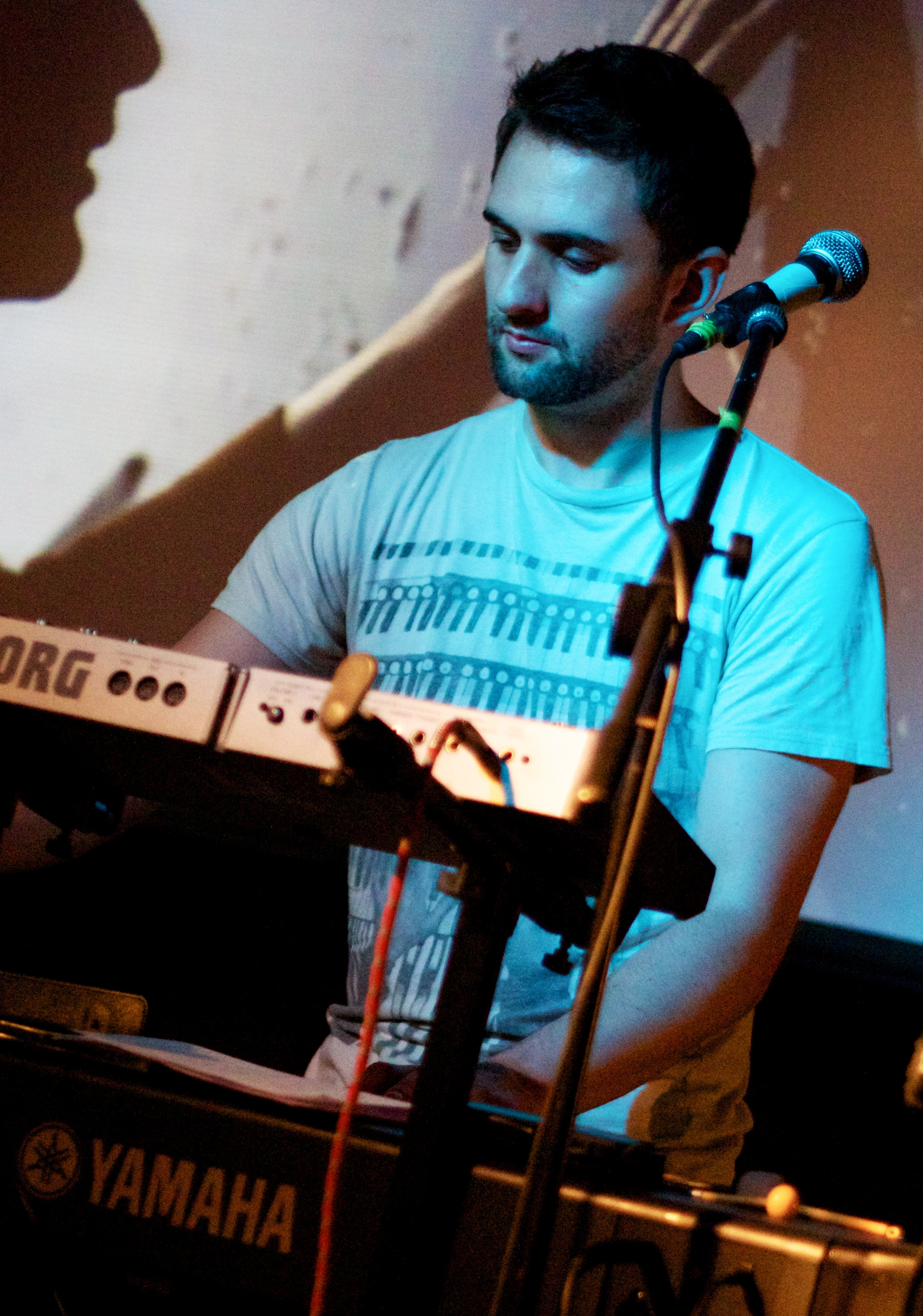
- Minute Taker performing live in Manchester, October 2012

Background information
- Born: Benjamin John McGarvey
- Genres: Avant-pop, synthpop, synthwave, alternative, folktronica
- Occupations: Singer-songwriter, musician, music producer
- Instruments: vocals, piano, synthesizer, guitar, glockenspiel,
- Years active: 2008–present
- Website: minutetaker.net

Benjamin John McGarvey (born 22 December 1981), known professionally as Minute Taker, is an English recording artist. He has released four albums: Too Busy Framing (2008), Last Things (2013), Wolf Hours (2022) and The Oblivion (2026) along with several EPs, including Reconstruction (2017), and a series of albums available exclusively through a subscription plan named Secret Songs.

== Early life and musical influences ==
McGarvey grew up in the Shropshire countryside. His interest in music began at the age of 12 when he started playing a piano in the basement of his family home. After having some music lessons, he preferred playing by ear and began writing his own songs. He has described how songwriting helped him to come to terms with his sexuality as a young teenager.

He told DNA Magazine in 2021 how he always loved 1980s music: "When I was a teenager in the '90s I was particularly uncool because the '80s were so unfashionable at that point. When I was 16 and went to college I got into a lot of alternative singer-songwriters like Kate Bush, Tori Amos, Björk and PJ Harvey. I pretty much taught myself how to play piano by sitting down and working out their songs". Other influences included A-ha, Kajagoogoo, Philip Oakey, and Orchestral Manoeuvres in the Dark. After college he went on to study contemporary music at university.

== Too Busy Framing (2008–2009) ==
Following his university studies, McGarvey moved to Manchester where he wrote and recorded songs in his bedroom. In February 2008, he self-financed his debut album Too Busy Framing (released under his own name). Clash described the album as "carefully constructed, layered compositions with as much in common with Múm as David Gray and his ilk". Manchester Evening News described McGarvey's songs as being "full of strange, hypnotic loops and samples, and the lonesome, existential imagery of his lyrics brings to mind a young Morrissey".

McGarvey has described how he sampled gay porn movies for the song "Lust": "creating the song's rhythm section from sounds created during intercourse".

Another of the album's songs "Disjointed" refers to serial killers Fred and Rose West.

In 2013, The 405 retrospectively praised Too Busy Framing stating that "As far as debut albums go, it remains an underrated hidden gem and continues to age rather well."

== The Spiels (2010–2013) ==
In 2010 McGarvey formed a band named The Spiels (an abbreviation of "glockenspiels") with singer-songwriter Ryan Lamey. The pair originally met when Lamey recruited some of McGarvey's backing band members for his own solo project. They later came to work together when Lamey replied to an advert McGarvey placed on Gumtree looking for musical collaborators and the project evolved into a five-piece band). Manchester Evening News described their music as "alternative folk-pop of infinitely dark hue" comparing their work to that of Arcade Fire, Kate Bush and Antony and the Johnsons.

The Spiels released their debut EP Nightvision Part 1 in January 2013.

== Last Things (2012–2014) ==
In 2012 McGarvey adopted the psydonymn of Minute Taker and released the EP Postlude. In reference to his change of artist name, McGarvey revealed in an interview with The 405 that "I never really felt comfortable using my own name". He described how he'd spent time working in offices as a Minute Taker and was drawn to the name because it simultaneously sounded "mundane and fantastical".

On 15 April 2013, McGarvey released his second solo album Last Things. He provided interviews for several publications, including Notion, Attitude, Gay Times and The 405. The latter featured two videos of McGarvey's performing "Somewhere Under Water" (from Last Things) and a cover version of Pet Shop Boys' "Heart" using piano, voice and various electronic instruments including a synthesizer and a loop pedal.

Last Things received favourable reviews. As part of a feature on Minute Taker, Notion described Last Things as "A beautiful collection of electronic-orientated pop songs that sound like old recordings that have been rediscovered and restored by a renegade computer; glitching and looping."

Three promotional singles from the album were released: "Merge", "Let It Go" and "Alkali". In February 2014, the 405 premiered Minute Taker's first music video for "Alkali", which incorporates clips from the 1922 expressionist film Nosferatu interwoven with degraded self-portrait footage and silent film-era narrational captions. "Skeleton Dance" (the b-side to "Alkali") has been played by Tom Robinson on BBC Radio 6 Music. Robinson also played "Merge" as part of a Kate Bush special show, citing McGarvey as a new artist who has been influenced by Bush's music.

== HOAX My Lonely Heart (2014–2017) ==
McGarvey composed the music for a stage musical Hoax: My Lonely Heart, which was shown at Manchester's Royal Exchange Theatre in June 2014. Written by Ravi Thornton, HOAX is a cross-media project consisting of the stage musical HOAX My Lonely Heart and accompanying graphic novel HOAX Psychosis Blues. The musical, directed by Benji Reid, was described on the Royal Exchange Theatre's website as "a dark musical fuelled by those most destructive of tendencies: love and self-sabotage". The story is based on the experiences of Ravi Thornton's younger brother Roabbi (aka Rob) who committed suicide in 2008 at the age of 31 after having suffered a long battle with schizophrenia. McGarvey created the music live on stage using a loop pedal, piano and vocal harmonies to accompany the actors who sang the lead parts.

Minute Taker toured the North of England with the show in Spring 2017 culminating at The Lowry, Salford.

In 2018, the HOAX project was nominated for a National Lottery Good Causes Award.

== To Love Somebody Melancholy (2015–2017) ==
McGarvey premiered audio-visual show To Love Somebody Melancholy at Chorlton Arts Festival in May 2015. A collaboration with illustrator/animator Ana Stefaniak, the show was described by the Chorlton Arts Festival website as "a story told through a contemporary song cycle and projected photographic animations, exploring the melancholic temperament of artists". Minute Taker toured To Love Somebody Melancholy across the UK in 2017.

== Reconstruction and Secret Songs (2017–20) ==
Minute Taker released the mini-album Reconstruction on 20 November 2017. The 405 premiered the opening track "In Slow Motion" on 14 November. The release features a cover version of the Pet Shop Boys song "Heart", which Minute Taker had recorded as a performance video for The 405 in 2013. He released three singles from the album: "Nothing to Fear", "Reservoir", and "The Weight of It All". In a review of the latter, God Is in the TV stated "Imagine a meeting of Alison Moyet and Doves, you get echoes of Kate Bush in the percussion and piano, and washes of Mancunian melancholy everywhere – the warmth is almost tangible." Minute Taker supported the mini-album release with a tour of British churches in February 2018.

In late 2017, Minute Taker announced Secret Songs, a subscription plan service that includes albums of unreleased material. Secret Songs Volume 1: Songs for Lost Lovers was released on 11 January 2018, followed by Volume 2: Almost on 25 May 2018, and Volume 3: Covers on 3 December 2018. A piano/vocal cover of Kate Bush's Running Up That Hill was released to promote the series. The song has gone on to become Minute Taker's most played track on Spotify and has received national airplay on BBC Radio 2.

On 30 June 2018, Minute Taker performed a concept album at Hebden Bridge Arts Festival titled Wilderness, "exploring a desire to escape the structures of society".

Minute Taker remixed Yazoo's song "Winter Kills" for the band's Four Pieces: A Yazoo Compendium 4LP Vinyl Boxset which was released on Mute Records/Sony BMG on 26 October 2018. The Quietus premiered the remix on 20 September 2018.

Minute Taker remixed Erasure's song "Home" for the band's reissued Chorus released on 14 February 2020, on BMG UK.

== Wolf Hours (2019–23) ==
In April 2019, Minute Taker announced the audiovisual show Wolf Hours, exploring the psyches of several gay men at different points in time over the past century, supported by Arts Council England and Superbia at Manchester Pride. The show premiered at Waterside Arts, Manchester in July 2019 at part of the "REFRACT:19" festival of experimental arts and was later performed at several other venues in late 2019 to early 2020 including Manchester's Hope Mill Theatre as part of their 2020 "Turn On Fest" LGBTQ+ theatre festival.

On 9 October 2019, Minute Taker released the single and music video from Wolf Hours named "Hearts (We'll Never Know)", inspired by 1970s/1980s horror movies.

Portsmouth FC showed the video for "Not Afraid", the second single from Wolf Hours at a football match on 7 December 2019, to promote LGBTQ inclusion in football in support of Stonewall's Rainbow Laces campaign. The video was directed by John Lochland (JL2 Productions) and explores the experiences and daydreams of a young gay footballer. Minute Taker publicly released the video on New Year's Day 2020.

"The Darkest Summer", the third single from the album was released on 12 August 2020, with a music video directed by Joe Stringer, set on a beach in the 1980s. A fourth single 500 Breakups was released on 28 May 2021. The single "After The Rain", featuring fellow LGBTQ+ singer-songwriter Bright Light Bright Light, was released on 6 August 2021, and received airplay on BBC Radio 2. The album's opening song "Lead You Home" was released as the sixth single on 14 January 2022. It was accompanied by a music video, directed by John Lochland and starring Solly McLeod, depicting a relationship between two World War 1 soldiers.

Wolf Hours, the album, was released on 28 January 2022, following a successful crowdfunding campaign where fans pre-ordered "Wolf Pack" bundles, which included CDs, vinyl, cassettes and merchandise. The album ranked among the best albums of 2022 for several publications including Albumism and DNA Magazine.

On 13 March 2022, Minute Taker released the charity single "I Don't Understand (Song for Ukraine)" to raise money for the Disasters Emergency Committee Ukraine Humanitarian Appeal.

On 6 September 2022, Minute Taker released an alternate version of the Wolf Hours album titled Secret Songs Volume 9: Mirror Edition. Available as part of the Secret Songs subscription plan, the album featured alternate mixes and previously unreleased songs, including two collaborations with synth-pop artist Color Theory. On 12 July 2023, Minute Taker released Secret Songs Volume 10: Wolf Hours Audiovisual Show featuring a DVD concert film of the show he'd developed and toured in 2019-20.

== The Oblivion (2024-present) ==
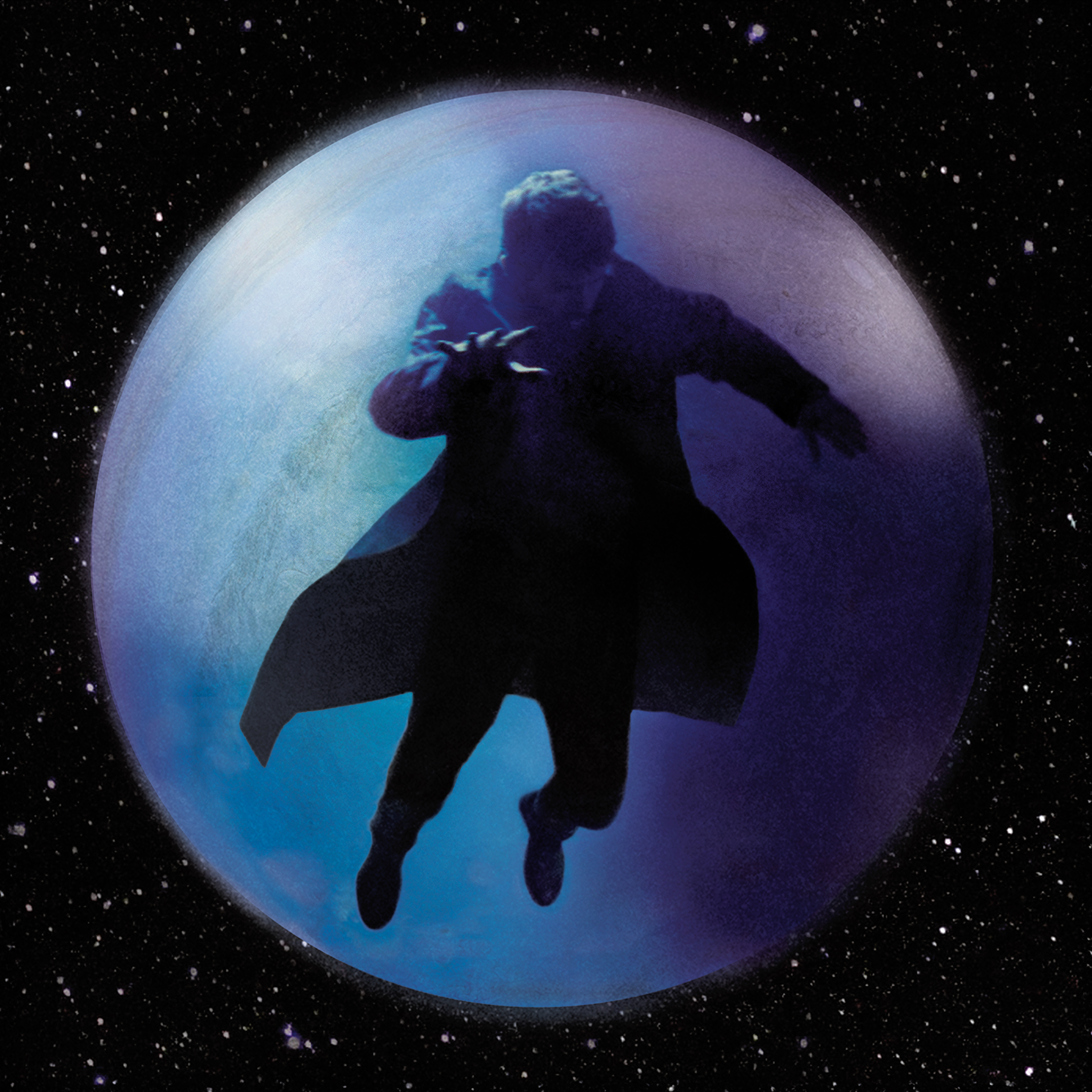
Cover art for Minute Taker's album 'The Oblivion'.

On 9 April 2024 FiXT Neon released Meet the Devil, a dark synthwave collaboration between Minute Taker and electronic trio 3FORCE.

In November 2024 Minute Taker premiered a new short music film, Nocturnal Monologues, at Waterside's Prism Festival with a series of outdoor, multiscreen performances. The film, directed by Brett De Vos, was made available for Minute Taker's Secret Songs subscribers to stream in December 2024 and the artist revealed that the film contains future music videos of songs from his upcoming album The Oblivion.

Minute Taker released 'Into the Dark', the first single from the album, on 7 November 2025, followed by 'Sleep-In Sundays' on 10 December 2025. The third single 'Surrender to the Night', released on 18 February 2026, was accompanied by a music video derived from the 'Nocturnal Monologues' film. Notion described the track as "steeped in retro-futurist synth textures and nocturnal atmosphere, the single explores escapism, self-confrontation and queer ecstasy, unfolding like a late-night invitation to step beyond the ordinary".

On 25 March 2026, Minute Taker released 'Losing Self-Control', a track co-written and produced by darkwave artist Curses. Its accompanying music video received over 100,000 views on YouTube within 10 days, becoming Minute Taker's most played video to date. Metal Magazine described how "the film moves between stark monochrome daytime scenes and vivid colour at night. During the day, the protagonist navigates an Orwellian workplace ruled by an authoritarian boss. As night falls, colour seeps back into the frame as a secret connection begins to blur the rigid order of his life."

The album 'The Oblivion' was released on 29 April 2026, followed 2 days later by the video for the album's closing track 'Alone'. The Needle Drop described the album as "one for those who like their synth-pop dark-edged, queer, and existential, with a side of cosmic fancy and cinematic nous. Doubling down on the ‘80s vibe of his last album Wolf Hours, Minute Taker’s The Oblivion loosely traces a hedonistic arc of unravelings, from the dancefloor to the dreamlike night, all told through different characters that are, in a way, extensions of himself."

== Discography ==
=== Albums ===
- Too Busy Framing (February 2008) as Ben McGarvey
- Last Things (15 April 2013)
- Secret Songs Volume 1: Songs for Lost Lovers (11 January 2018), subscription plan only release
- Secret Songs Volume 2: Almost (25 May 2018), subscription plan only release
- Secret Songs Volume 3: Covers (3 December 2018), subscription plan only release
- Secret Songs Volume 4: Office Daydreams (17 May 2019), subscription plan only release
- Secret Songs Volume 5: Early Songs (5 December 2019), subscription plan only release
- Secret Songs Volume 6: Remixes (19 August 2020), subscription plan only release
- Secret Songs Volume 7: Piano Songs (14 December 2020), subscription plan only release
- Secret Songs Volume 8: Soon After Dark (7 October 2021), subscription plan only release
- Wolf Hours (28 January 2022)
- Secret Songs Volume 9: Mirror Edition (6 September 2022), subscription plan only release
- Secret Songs Volume 10: Wolf Hours Audiovisual Show (CD and DVD set, 12 July 2023), subscription plan only release
- Last Things: 10th Anniversary Edition (6 November 2023)
- Secret Songs Volume 11: Live at Waterside (2 CD and DVD set, 21 December 2024), subscription plan only release
- The Oblivion (29 April 2026)

=== EPs ===
- Postlude (5 November 2012)
- Nightvision Part 1 (January 2013) with The Spiels
- Alkali (3 March 2014)
- Reconstruction (20 November 2017)
- Running Up That Hill (Matt Pop and StarLab Remixes) (30 April 2021)

=== Singles ===
- "My Electric Wire/Disjointed" (promotional single, June 2008) as Ben McGarvey
- "Merge" (promotional single, March 2013)
- "Let It Go" (promotional single, April 2013)
- "Alkali" (March 2014)
- "A Captain/This Dark Man" (promotional single – May 2014) from the stage musical HOAX My Lonely Heart
- "Nothing to Fear" (promotional single – April 2017) from the stage musical HOAX My Lonely Heart
- "The Weight of It All" (8 January 2018)
- "Reservoir" (20 February 2018)
- "Running Up That Hill" (Kate Bush cover, 19 April 2019)
- "Hearts (We'll Never Know)" (9 October 2019)
- "Not Afraid" (1 January 2020)
- "Under The Ivy" (Kate Bush cover, 22 April 2020)
- "The Darkest Summer" (12 August 2020)
- "Neon Lines" (with Walter Alienson, 21 January 2021)
- "500 Breakups" (28 May 2021)
- "After the Rain" (featuring Bright Light Bright Light, 6 August 2021)
- "Lead You Home" (14 January 2022)
- "I Don't Understand (Song for Ukraine)" (13 March 2022)
- "I've Seen You in a Dream" (with Color Theory, 6 May 2022)
- "Former Selves" (26 August 2022)
- "Just an Echo" (with Color Theory, 16 September 2022)
- "Northern Lad" (Tori Amos cover, with Jody Gadsden and Ryan Lamey, 21 October 2022)
- "True Colors" (Cyndi Lauper cover, with LAU and Zak Vortex, 28 July 2023, Aztec Records)
- "Reach Back Through Time" (with Walter Alienson, 18 August 2023, Aztec Records)
- "Meet the Devil" (with 3FORCE, 9 April 2024, FiXT Music)
- "Our Last Song" (with Color Theory, 14 June 2024)
- "Something Strange This Christmas" (13 December 2024)
- "Into the Dark" (7 November 2025)
- "Sleep-In Sundays" (10 December 2025)
- "Surrender to the Night" (18 February 2026)
- "Losing Self-Control" (25 March 2026)

=== Music videos ===
- "Alkali" (March 2014), directed by Ben McGarvey
- "Nothing to Fear" (April 2017), directed by John Grey
- "Hearts (We'll Never Know)" (9 October 2019), directed by Ben McGarvey/Raphaël Neal
- "Not Afraid" (1 January 2020), directed by John Lochland
- "The Darkest Summer" (12 August 2020), directed by Joe Stringer
- "Neon Lines" with Walter Alienson (21 January 2021), directed by Skin&Bones and Bryan Rothschild
- "Lead You Home" (1 December 2021), directed by John Lochland
- "Surrender to the Night" (18 February 2026), directed by Brett De Vos
- "Losing Self-Control" (25 March 2026), directed by Brett De Vos
- "Alone" (1 May 2026), directed by Brett De Vos

=== Remixes for other artists ===
- "Winter Kills" by Yazoo (Mute/BMG, 26 October 2018)
- "Home" by Erasure (Mute/BMG, 14 February 2020)

== Shows ==
- HOAX My Lonely Heart (stage musical, 2014 at Manchester Royal Exchange Theatre, 2017 at The Lowry, Salford and other tour dates), composer and performer
- To Love Somebody Melancholy (audiovisual show, 2015 at Chorlton Arts Festival, 2017 UK tour) composer, performer and producer
- Wilderness (conceptual concert, 2018 at Hebden Bridge Arts Festival) composer, performer and producer
- Wolf Hours (audiovisual show, 2019 at Waterside Arts, Manchester followed by various dates) composer, performer and producer
- Nocturnal Monologues (audiovisual show, 2024 at Waterside Arts, Manchester for Prism Festival 2024) composer, performer and co-producer
