= Peter Jensen (fashion designer) =

Danish fashion designer

- Occupation: Fashion designer

Peter Jensen (born in Løgstør, Denmark) is a clothing designer and a professor of fashion at Savannah College of Art and Design in Atlanta, Georgia.

== Background ==
Jensen initially studied graphic design, embroidery and tailoring at The Royal Danish Academy of Design in Copenhagen before moving to London in 1997 to undertake an MA in fashion design at Central Saint Martins College of Art and Design. He graduated in 1999 and formed his eponymous menswear label afterwards, Peter Jensen, Ltd., subsequently introducing womenswear. Jensen regularly showed his collections on the main schedule at London Fashion Week and New York Fashion Week while lecturing at Ravensbourne College of Design and Communication.

Jensen and his design team worked in a studio based in Dalston, East London until 2018. That year, the designer sold his business to South Korea-based Pastel World, and moved to Atlanta to start as the associate chair of fashion at Savannah College of Art and Design.

In 2024, Jensen launched his new brand, Yours Truly, at Copenhagen Fashion Week. It is a sustainable clothing brand made and produced in Denmark, Los Angeles, and Atlanta. Yours Truly is also a platform to promote emerging artists, no matter their age or choice of material. The brand includes a gingham line, a home line, a smock line, and a line with other artists.

Jensen's inspirations include actress Mary Miles Minter, photographer Tina Barney, the character Candice Marie from the Mike Leigh film, Nuts In May, actress Sissy Spacek, Olympic ice skater Tonya Harding, frequent John Waters collaborator Mink Stole, businesswoman Helena Rubinstein, author Gertrude Stein, artist Cindy Sherman, singer Nina Simone, art collector Peggy Guggenheim, actress Shelley Duvall, artist Barbara Hepworth, and Jensen's Auntie Jytte, who ran a chip shop and taxi company in Nuuk, Greenland.

== Reception ==
Famous fans of Jensen's designs include musicians Amy Winehouse, Rihanna, Nina Persson from The Cardigans, Kanye West and The Zutons’ Abi Harding. High-profile actors among his customer base include Rachel Bilson, Orlando Bloom, Kirsten Dunst, Lena Dunham, Dakota Fanning, Sofie Gråbøl, Maggie Gyllenhaal, Nicole Kidman and Lindsay Lohan. Film maker John Waters also expressed his admiration for Jensen's work on the SS/08 Mink collection inspired by Waters' collaborator, Mink Stole.

Jensen has also received considerable industry support from international fashion critics, editors and writers:

Harriet Quick, British Vogue: "Cleverly conceived, quirkily humorous clothes.... both distinctive and of the moment."

Sarah Mower, Vogue Runway: "The light-hearted Peter Jensen experience has become a moment to cherish. Jensen’s clothes never seem to be overly styled, but ... capture the gist of things without seeming to try."

Women's Wear Daily: "A breath of fresh air... Jensen offers the cool basics that every girl should have in her wardrobe."

i-D: "Creatively and technically brilliant... visually and conceptually captivating."

Susannah Frankel, AnOther Magazine: "Witty, pretty, proudly individual and imaginative in the extreme."

Mari Alexander, MGR: "Brilliant...fitting for a collection centered around championing individuality and strength."

== Collaborations ==
Jensen is a prolific collaborator, having worked with a wide range of partners from multinational retail chains to independent artists. He has collaborated on art projects with Kavel Rafferty ("The simple dress"), artist Laurie Simmons (In Wolves Clothing Re-imagining the Doll), photographer Annie Collinge (Annie & Peter - A road trip, from Copenhagen to Løgstøraward"), and Julie Verhoeven on "Handle with care," an art project with illustrations and broken china, and "A fur wall." His work, 'the party,' was a one night exhibition in Copenhagen with performances by Nina Persson and Nathan Larson. His work has been featured on the TV shows Portlandia and Girls, and in the feature film, Tiny Furniture.

He has also designed capsule collections or items for Urban Outfitters (PJ by Peter Jensen), Rosendahl Design Group (PJ x JUNA), People Tree, Nickelodeon (part of the SpongeBob Gold brand), Hazzys (Hazzys in Peterland), Le Sportsac, Fashionary (Peter Jensen x Fashionary), Expo Milan, Le Bon Marche in Paris, Colette, Beams Tokyo, and Opening Ceremony, Dover Street Market, Topshop, Fred Perry, among others.

== Exhibitions and publications ==
Jensen's work has exhibited or been added to collections at many institutions including the Hepworth Wakefield, England, the V&A in London, Design Museum Denmark in Copenhagen, House of Voltaire, Manchester Art Gallery in Manchester, Central Saint Martins in London, the John Waters archive at Wesleyan University, the Designmuseum Denmark, the Fashion Museum in Bath, England, the National Museum of Denmark in Copenhagen, Greenland National Museum in Nuuk, Greenland, London College of Fashion, Berlin University of the Arts, and Fashion Institute of Technology in New York, and more. Two of his pieces were added to the permanent collection of the Metropolitan Museum of Art's Costume Institute in 2025.

He was part of the exhibition, Reconstruction: Cultural Heritage and the Making of Contemporary Fashion (with Vivienne Westwood and Hussein Chalayan) arranged by The British Council.

Jensen's 10-year anniversary exhibition was featured at Seoul National University Museum of Art in South Korea, Design Museum Denmark, and at Diptrics in Tokyo; Dent-de-Leone also published a book to commemorate the 10th anniversary.

His designs and text have appeared in numerous publications including Fakerocks - Friends? A Geological Study of (Newspaper Club, 2023) and OH DEAR - A Typology of Drain Pipes (Newspaper Club, 2020). by photographer Dante Fewster Holdsworth. and Jeanette (Dent-de-Leone, 2017). His eponymous 2011 publication published by Dent-de-Leone also featured essays by Susannah Frankel and Emily King.

== Distinctions ==
Jensen has received numerous accolades in his long fashion career including Wallpaper's award for best collaboration for his Fred Perry capsule collection, and Magasin du Nords Fond (2012).

In 2009, he became the first fashion designer to be awarded £100,000 by the Danish Arts Council. The Danish Arts Council has also granted him a lifetime award (2021), awards for "the party," "Annie & Peter - A road trip, from Copenhagen to Løgstøraward" and "Dante, Maki and Peter - A road trip in America," Sølvsmed Kay Bojesen og hustru Erna Bojesens Mindelegat (2011), and a three-year work Grant (2009).

== Inspirations ==
Jensen's collections are consistently inspired by and named after a muse:

- SS 2000 'Alison' - Alison Steadman (actress)
- AW 00/01 'Brenda' - Brenda Blethyn (actress)
- SS 2001 'Claire' - Claire Skinner (actress)
- AW 01-02 'Minter' - Mary Miles Minter (silent film actress)
- SS 2002 'Mildred' - (Bette Davis's character in Of Human Bondage)
- AW 02-03 'Emma' - Emma Cook (fashion designer)
- SS 2003 'Olga' - Olga Korbut (gymnast)
- AW 03-04 'Nancy' - Nancy Mitford (author)
- SS 2004 'Gertrude' - Gertrude Stein (author and art patron)
- AW 04-05 'Cindy' - Cindy Sherman (artist)
- SS 2005 'Tonya' - Tonya Harding (ice skater)
- AW 05-06 'Fanny' - (character from Fanny and Alexander)
- SS 2006 'Sissy' - Sissy Spacek (actress)
- AW 06-07 'Helena' - Helena Rubinstein (business leader and philanthropist)
- SS 2007 'Tina' - Tina Barney (photographer)
- AW 07-08 'Christina' - Princess Christina of Denmark
- SS 2008 'Mink' - Mink Stole (collaborator with John Waters)
- AW 08-09 'Candice-Marie' - (Alison Steadman's character in the Mike Leigh film Nuts in May)
- AW 08-09 'Keith' - (Roger Sloman's character in the Mike Leigh film Nuts in May)
- SS 2009 'Jodie' - Jodie Foster (actress)
- AW 09-10 'Jytte' - Jytte (Peter Jensen's aunt from Greenland)
- Resort 2010 'Diane' - Diane Arbus (photographer)
- SS 2010 'Laurie' - Laurie Simmons (artist and photographer)
- AW 10-11 'Muriel' - Dame Muriel Spark (author)
- Resort 2011 'Abigail' - (character from Mike Leigh's play Abigail's Party)
- SS 2011 'Shelley' - Shelley Duvall (actress)
- AW 11-12 'Anna Karina' - Anna Karina (born Hanne Karin Blarke Bayer, actress)
- Resort 2012 'Meryl' - Meryl Streep (actress)
- SS 2012 'Bush' - Thomas Bush (graphic designer)
- SS 2012 'Nina' - Nina Simone (singer, songwriter, and civil rights activist)
- Prefall 2012 'Erika' - Erika Wall (model)
- AW 12-13 'Thelma' - Thelma Speirs (entrepreneur at Bernstock-Speirs)
- Resort 2013 'Tippi' - Tippi Hedren (actress)
- SS 2013 'Mick' - Mick Jagger (musician)
- SS 2013 'Barbara' - Barbara Hepworth (artist)
- Pre-AW 13-24 'Arne' - Arne Jacobsen (architect)
- AW 13-14 'Viv' - Vivian Nicholson
- Resort 2014 'Paulette' - Paulette Goddard (actress)
- SS 2014 'Andy' - Andy Warhol (artist)
- SS 2014 'Diana' - Diana Ross (musician)
- Pre-fall 14 'Sunny' - Sunny von Bülow (heiress)
- AW 2014 'Claus' - Claus von Bülow
- Resort 15 'Yoko' - Yoko Ono (artist)
- SS 2015 'Lucy' - (character from Peanuts)
- Pre-fall 15 'Penelope' - Penelope Tree (model)
- AW 2015 'Julia' - Princess Julia (London club scene figure)
- Resort 16 'Enid' - (character in Ghostworld)
- SS 2016 'Shirley' - Shirley Kurata (stylist)
- AW 16-17 'Peggy' - Peggy Guggenheim (art collector)
- Resort 2017 'Rhoda'- Part 1 & 2 - Rhoda Vava Mary Lecky Birley (gardener who fed her roses lobsters)
- Resort 2018 'Sandy' Part 1 & 2 - Sandy Dennis (actress)
- AW 18-19 'Kajsa' - Kajsa Stahl (graphic designer)
