= Betty Jackson =

English fashion designer

Betty Jackson CBE
- Born: 24 June 1949 (age 76); Bacup, Lancashire, England
- Spouse: David Cohen (died 2020)
- Children: 2, including Oliver Jackson-Cohen

Betty Jackson, CBE RDI (born 24 June 1949) is an English fashion designer based in London, England. She was born in Lancashire. In 2007, her success in British fashion was recognised with first an MBE in the Queen's Birthday Honours 1987 and later with a CBE for "services to the fashion industry." She is also known for designing many of the costumes worn by Edina and Patsy on the 1990s hit television comedy Absolutely Fabulous.

== Early life ==
Jackson was born in Bacup, Lancashire, on 24 June 1949. Her father, Arthur Jackson, owned a shoe factory, and her mother, Phyllis Gertrude (Rains), shopped 'for the season' at Kendal Milne in Manchester. One leg was amputated at the age of six as it failed to grow following a dislocation during her birth. A car accident caused further complications and she has walked with a stick ever since.

She was educated at Bacup and Rawtenstall Grammar School. She studied fashion at the Birmingham College of Art under Zandra Rhodes, and started her fashion career as a fashion illustrator during her senior year (1971) at college. She learned her trade in the later 1970s as a designer for the Quorum line of Ossie Clark.

== Career ==
In 1973, Jackson joined Wendy Dagworthy as her design assistant. She moved to further positions at Quorum, then Coopers, before setting up her own design company.

She introduced Betty Jackson for Men collection, 1986, and opened her flagship shop in the Brompton Road, London, 1991. In 2000, she launched the Autograph collection for Marks & Spencer and later worked on the Betty Jackson Black label for Debenhams.

As a member of an advisory panel to the British Fashion Council's Model Health Inquiry, Jackson has been involved in the 'size zero' debate. After the death in 2006 of two models who had eating disorders, media attention was drawn to the health and size of the girls. Jackson agreed to join the panel.

In 2008, Jackson worked as design consultant alongside a panel of judges, designing new gowns for High Court and Court of Appeal judges.

In 2015, She was elected as the Master of the Faculty for the Royal Designers for Industry at the Royal Society of Arts, Manufactures and Commerce.

== Philanthropy ==
She has volunteered for Smart Works, a non-profit organisation which gives free clothes and advice about job interviews to women who are unemployed.

== Politics ==
In August 2014, despite having no ties to Scotland, Jackson was one of 200 public figures who were signatories to a letter to The Guardian opposing Scottish independence in the run-up to that September's referendum on that issue.

== Personal life ==
In 1981, she met her husband David Cohen (also her business partner) and they set up their company, Betty Jackson Ltd. They worked together for nearly four decades. David was from an Egyptian-Jewish family that moved to France. He died in January 2020. They had two children; a daughter, Pascale, and a son, actor and model Oliver Jackson-Cohen.

== Awards ==
- Student Design Award, Royal Society of Arts, London, 1970
- Woman Magazine Separates Designer of the Year award, London, 1981, 1983;
- Cotton Institute Cotton Designer of the Year award, 1983;
- Bath Museum of Costume Dress of the Year award, 1984;
- British Designer of the Year award, 1985;
- Harvey Nichols award, 1985;
- International Linen Council Fil d'Or award, 1985, 1989; Viyella award, 1987;
- MBE, 1987;
- Royal Designer for Industry (RDI), Royal Society of Arts, London, 1988
- Honorary Fellow, Royal College of Art, London, 1989
- Fellow, Birmingham Polytechnic, 1989;
- Honorary Fellow, University of Central Lancashire, 1992
- Designer of the Year, 1999
- CBE, 2007
- Honorary Doctor, University of Huddersfield, 2011
- Honorary Doctorate, Norwich University of the Arts, 2017
