= Wendy Dagworthy =

British fashion designer

Wendy Dagworthy OBE
- Born: Wendy Ann Dagworthy; 4 March 1950 (age 76); Gravesend, Kent, England
- Occupations: Fashion designer, university academic
- Notable credit(s): Wendy Dagworthy label (1972–1988), Member of British Fashion Council (1996), Professor at RCA (1998–2014), OBE for services to fashion (2011)

Wendy Ann Dagworthy OBE (born 4 March 1950) is an English former fashion designer and now design academic. During her career she has led fashion design teaching at both the Royal College of Art and Central Saint Martins, mentoring notable fashion designers including Stella McCartney and Hussein Chalayan. An influential designer in her own right in the 1970s and '80s with the Wendy Dagworthy label, and one of the founders of London Fashion Week, she was described by the Daily Telegraph as: "the high priestess of British fashion".

== Early life ==
Wendy Ann Dagworthy was born in 1950 in Gravesend, Kent, the daughter of Jean A. (Stubbs) and Arthur Sidney Dagworthy. She was interested in fashion from an early age, noting that: "Sewing was something you did back then. You learnt needlework at school. There were no high-street shops where you could buy cheap clothes, so you would go to the market, buy some fabric and knock up your own". She was a pupil at Northfleet School for Girls, later attending Medway College of Art (now the University for the Creative Arts). She studied fashion at Hornsey College of Art, where her degree show attracted attention.

== Design company ==
After leaving college, Dagworthy began working with the wholesale company Radley, which then owned the brand Ossie Clark. She was also creating her own designs and, at 22, she had her first collection to sell to London stores. These included the independent King's Road boutique Countdown – the store's clients included Mick Jagger. One of Dagworthy's early personal customers was musician Bryan Ferry, who she had met through a Gravesend connection. She designed some of Roxy Music's stage costumes and also made Ferry a pair of monogrammed black silk pyjamas to wear in hospital while he was having his tonsils out.

With a bank loan of £800 and a further loan from her parents, the Wendy Dagworthy label was established in 1972. It operated initially from Dagworthy's flat and she would smuggle rolls of fabric up in the lift to avoid detection. She employed Betty Jackson as her fashion assistant as the business continued to grow, and she was also able to take on a studio in Berwick Street, Soho, a short walk from Carnaby Street. This was during the Three-Day Week and Dagworthy would have to go home at 4pm when the lights were switched off.

=== Label hallmarks ===
The Wendy Dagworthy label's trademark style was loose and unstructured, with a focus on natural fibres and textures, such as wool, mohair and wool barathea, and details such as detachable hoods and double pockets. Clothes combined bright patterns and colours, including florals, stripes and batik prints in shades such as scarlet and orange. The label was also known for its use of Liberty prints. Signature garments included circular skirts, oversized wool coats and wide cropped jackets. According to Dagworthy, the inspirations for her designs included menswear, workwear, ethnic clothing and the detailing found on shirts.

=== Company success and demise ===
Exports proved a particularly strong market for the label, and during the early 1980s almost half of Wendy Dagworthy output went to Italy. France and the US also proved to be good markets.

As her business grew, Dagworthy became acknowledged as one of the key players in the London fashion scene, alongside her former assistant Betty Jackson, Jasper Conran and Paul Smith. The label exhibited in Paris, Milan and New York and Dagworthy was among the guests at the Downing Street fashion industry reception in 1984 where Katharine Hamnett wore a Pershing protest T-shirt. However, by 1988 and in the midst of a recession, Dagworthy's company went into voluntary liquidation. Recalling this period for an interview in the Daily Telegraph, she said: "And then it crashed. Suddenly the Italians stopped buying, the Americans stopped buying..."

== Advisory and academic roles ==
Wendy Dagworthy continued to work in the industry, acting as a design consultant for brands such as Laura Ashley, Betty Jackson and Liberty. She worked to promote the UK fashion industry, both as a judge of numerous fashion awards and as an organiser of the forerunner of London Fashion Week. She became a member of the British Fashion Council in 1996.

In 1989 she joined the staff of Central Saint Martins as head of the BA Fashion course. During her nine-year tenure, she helped to train designers such as Stella McCartney, Alexander McQueen, Hussein Chalayan, Antonio Berardi, Sonja Nuttall and Suzanne Clements and Inacio Ribeiro (Clements Ribeiro).

Dagworthy joined the RCA in 1998 as course director and professor, teaching MA students. Two years later, she became head of its School of Fashion and Textiles and in 2011 was made head of the newly created School of Material, incorporating both fashion and textile disciplines. Students trained under Dagworthy include Erdem and Holly Fulton.

Dagworthy was appointed an Officer of the Order of the British Empire (OBE) in the 2011 New Year Honours "for services to the fashion industry." Among her more recent advisory roles are contributing to the 2009 Design Museum exhibition Super Contemporary – for which she contributed a personal 'map' charting the 1970s London fashion scene – and acting as expert advisor to the V&A's 1980s exhibition From Club to Catwalk (2013–14).

In January 2014, Dagworthy announced that she would be retiring from the RCA at the end of the academic year. In May 2014, the RCA held a celebratory exhibition, in tandem with its annual graduate fashion show, to mark her 16 years in the role of head of fashion.

She was featured on BBC Radio 4's Desert Island Discs programme on Sunday 2 November 2014; her chosen favourite tracks were "No Woman, No Cry" by Bob Marley and the Wailers and "La Vie En Rose" by Grace Jones, her favourite book being The Raj Quartet by Paul Scott, and her luxury item "a case of red lipstick and a fridge to keep it cool."

== Personal life ==
Wendy Dagworthy is married to the photographer Jonathan W. Prew. The couple's sons are Somerset Prew and Kick-Ass 2 actor Augustus Prew. She is the mother-in-law of Prew's husband, actor Jeffery Self.
