= Northfleet School for Girls =

Location
- Hall Road; Northfleet, Kent, DA11 8AQ; England; 51.4290°N 0.3414°E

Information
- Type: Foundation high school
- Established: March 1937
- Local authority: Kent County Council
- Department for Education URN: 118788 Tables
- Ofsted: Reports
- Headteacher: C Norwood
- Age: 11 to 18
- Enrolment: 1,178 as of January 2023
- Houses: Athena , Eyidia , Themis , Hyperion , Iris
- Website: http://www.nsfg.org.uk

Northfleet School for Girls is a Secondary school for girls, located in Northfleet in the English county of Kent.

The school first opened in March 1937 in a new building next to Northfleet School for Boys in Colyer Road. In 1950 The Upper School moved to the current school site in Hall Road in 1950, with the rest of the school following in 1955. that the whole school was able to move to the new buildings. Building work for the South Wing of the school were started in 1971.

It is a foundation school administered by Kent County Council, who coordinate admissions. As a foundation school, it is supported by a Cooperative Learning Trust which includes The Co-operative Group, Age UK, North West Kent College, the University of Greenwich and the Workers' Educational Association as partners.

Northfleet School for Girls offers GCSEs and BTECs as programmes of study for pupils, while students in the sixth form have the option to study from a range of A Levels and further BTECs.

== Notable former pupils ==
- Wendy Dagworthy, fashion designer.
