= Ossie Clark =

English fashion designer (1942–1996)

Ossie Clark

Raymond "Ossie" Clark (/ˈɒziː/; 9 June 1942 – 6 August 1996) was a British fashion designer who was a major figure in the Swinging Sixties scene in London and the fashion industry in that era. Clark is now renowned for his vintage designs by present-day designers.

Clark is compared to the 1960s fashion label Biba and influenced many other designers, including Yves Saint Laurent, Anna Sui and Tom Ford. Manolo Blahnik has said of Ossie Clark's work: "He created an incredible magic with the body and achieved what fashion should do—produce desire." Ossie Clark and Ossie Clark for Radley clothes are highly sought after, and are worn by well known models such as Kate Moss and Naomi Campbell.

== Early life ==
Ossie Clark was born on 9 June 1942 to Ann and Samuel Clark in Warrington, Lancashire, England. During the Second World War, the Clark family moved to Oswaldtwistle, where he was given his nickname "Ossie" when they later moved to Warrington in 1950. Ossie's mother, Ann Grace Clark, was in labour with Ossie for seven days and gave birth during an air raid in the Second World War. Ann had been expecting a girl and had no name picked out for her new baby boy. She let the midwife name him Raymond. Ossie was the youngest of six children (Gladys, Marjorie (later known as Kay) Beryl, Sammy and John). Ossie and his brother John and Kay's son James sang in the church choir at St Oswald's Church in Winwick, where Ossie won awards for his vocal talents.

Family and friends noted that from a very early age he was "brilliant at doing anything". Clark would make clothes for his nieces and nephews. He practised tailoring clothing on his dolls and designed swimsuits for the neighbourhood girls when not yet 10 years old. Roy Thomas, the art teacher at Clark's secondary school – himself heavily involved in fabric art – recognised his creative flair and gave him a large collection of Vogue and Harper's Bazaar magazines. Clark pored over these magazines and absorbed the glamour and cutting edge fashion.

At the age of 13, Clark studied architecture in school. He later said that the experience was "invaluable". The class taught him the fundamentals of proportion, height and volume. He would later go on to use all of these to great effect in his fashion designs.

Soon after leaving Beamont Secondary Technical School, Clark attended the Regional College of Art in Manchester at the age of 16. Anne Clark would give Ossie prescribed pills to keep him awake and alert, due to the long hours and commute this had entailed. This would be the start of a lifelong addiction to prescribed and illegal drugs.

While attending college in Manchester, Clark was introduced to Celia Birtwell by a close friend and classmate named Mo McDermott. The pair started out as just good friends but that friendship soon developed into a romantic relationship. Clark also became good friends with artist David Hockney during this period. Clark and Hockney took an inspirational trip to New York City together while still at college where they made many valuable connections in the fashion, art and entertainment communities. The friends are widely rumoured to have been lovers with a volatile relationship. Clark graduated from the Regional College of Art in 1962.

Clark then attended the Royal College of Art in London and achieved a first-class degree in 1965. While attending college in London, Celia Birtwell came to live with Clark in his small Notting Hill flat. Clark's degree fashion show at the RCA was a huge success. At this time his design style was heavily influenced by pop art and Hollywood glamour. The final line-up featured a dress with flashing lightbulbs down the front which was shown in every major newspaper and fashion publication the following day. The fashion press swamped Clark with requests for photo-shoots and special order garments. In August that year he had his first feature in British Vogue. A popular shop named 'Woollands 21' in London's Sloane Street was the first to begin selling Ossie Clark's clothing line.

== Early career ==
Clark quickly began to make his mark in the fashion industry, with Alice Pollock's exclusive boutique Quorum featuring his designs in 1966. Clark had been introduced to Pollock at his RCA show by Quorum's backer at the behest of Hockney and so taken with the young designer was she that she immediately decided to bring him in as co-designer for Quorum. He presented a collection of white and cream chiffon garments that sold fast. Pollock wanted Clark's clothes to have a more organic feel, and so commissioned Celia Birtwell to produce special textiles for the next collection. In this way one of fashion's most famous collaborations was born, with Clark designing clothes and Birtwell designing prints.

This partnership would last for almost all of Clark's career in fashion. Author Judith Watt comments: "Celia collaborated with Ossie. This was a joint effort. People say that she was his muse, which indeed she was, but their work absolutely went hand in hand. It was her designs that he used to create his. I think it's unfair that she not be given that voice".

Clark was noted, from this period on, for buying six new record albums a week, all from the newest and most popular recording artists. His love of music and art were legendary amongst his friends. Also at this time Clark began to take hard drugs more recreationally with friend and business partner Alice Pollock. "This is when his character began to change" says longtime friend Lady Henrietta Rous.

The first full Ossie Clark collection was bought by the Henri Bendel department store in New York. His simple, elegant dresses were widely copied by the designers on Seventh Avenue.

== Peak: 1965–1974 ==
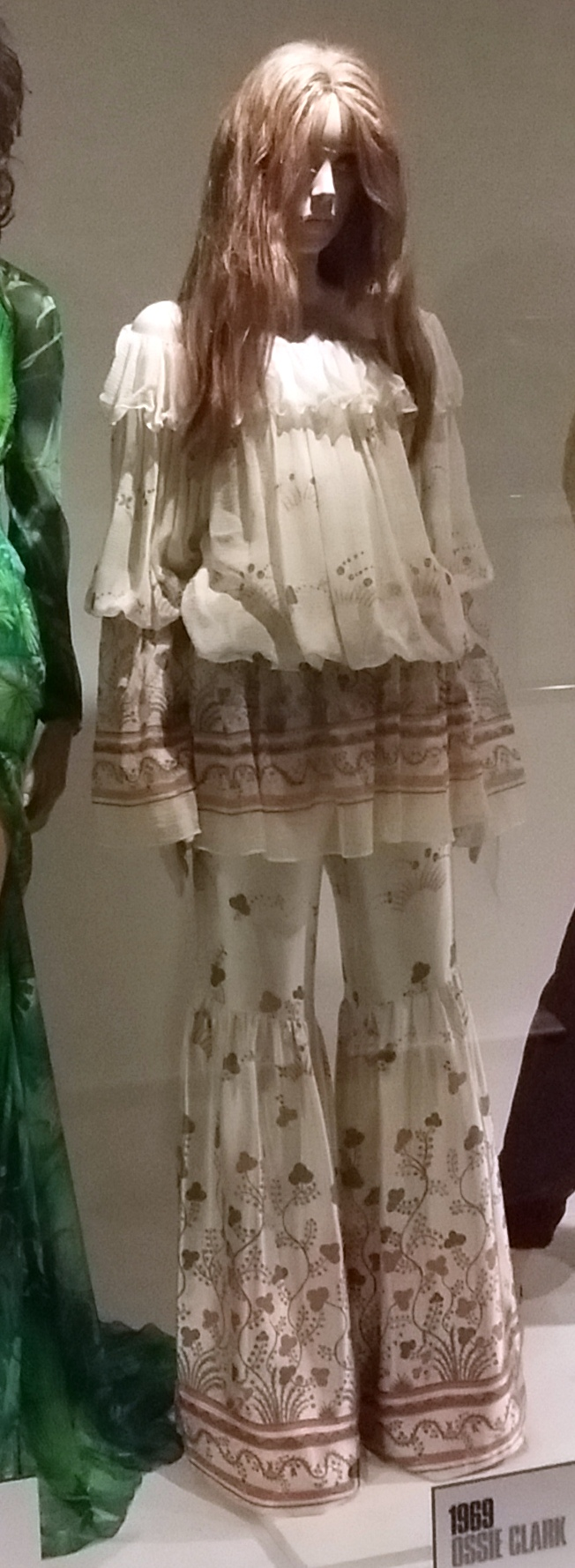
Ossie Clark satin and chiffon trouser suit in "Botticelli" print, 1969

The period from 1965 to 1974 is regarded as Clark's zenith, during which time he had many famous clients.

In the late 1960s, Clark hit a rich vein for his flamboyant clothing range. The fashion press dubbed him the "King of King's Road". Clark pronounced himself a "master cutter. It's all in my brain and fingers and there's no-one in the world to touch me. I can do everything myself." Clark's great idol was the famous dancer Nijinsky and his love of dance inspired his clothes to be free moving and not to restrict the female form. This style of dressing became quite popular in the 1970s thanks in large part to the popularity of Clark's clothing. He was well known for his use of muted colours and moss crepe fabric. He also designed shoes, paper dresses, and snakeskin jackets.

While Clark and Pollock were great at creating an image and drawing in the rich and famous, they were less successful at managing a business. Many garments were given away to celebrities or were stolen from the shop. By 1967, Quorum, the partnership between Alice Pollock and Clark, was deeply in debt and Pollock's financial backer, Mike Armitage, a stockbroker, decided there was little possibility of Quorum ever making a profit and he and Pollock agreed to sell Quorum to a large UK fashion house, Radley (run by Alfred Radley). Radley took over Quorum's debts and put the management onto a sound basis. Alfred Radley was keen to maintain what made Clark special and so he continued to support Clark's aspirations by developing the Ossie Clark brand and funding large annual fashion shows, expanding Quorum's retail business and distributing Clark's dresses to leading retailers around the world through the introduction of the "Ossie Clark for Radley" collections.

In 1967 Clark presented his first fashion show under the patronage of Radley at Chelsea Town Hall for Pathé News. He also showed his first full collection in London's Berkeley Square. It was also the first British fashion show to feature black models. In 1968 Clark designed his first of many diffusion lines for Radley, "Ossie Clark for Radley" aimed at a high street clientele.

Clark was not just popular in London, but also in New York and Paris. He dressed the rich and famous who inhabited fashionable British society of the late 1960s and early 1970s. Clark got in on the ground floor of many of the popular performers and actors of the time period and was accepted in their circles when many other designers were not. This gave him many advantages to dress the rich and famous. Clark made many stage costumes for Mick Jagger, the Beatles, Marianne Faithfull and Liza Minnelli, among others. Peter Gabriel borrowed a red Clark dress from his wife Jill to wear with a fox's head, as depicted on the cover of the Genesis album Foxtrot.

He married Celia Birtwell in 1969, and together they had two sons, Albert and George. Clark had long hoped for a large family of his own, and his children were a great joy in his life.

Clark freely adopted the hedonistic lifestyle of the 1960s and 1970s: his drug use greatly impacted on his emotional state and finances. Clark and Birtwell divorced in 1974. This started a slow downward spiral for Clark, who never recovered emotionally from the separation from Birtwell and his two children. With his family structure and work stability now gone, his creative output became strained.

However, in 1977 Clark went into business with Tony Calder and Peter Lee, and for two years enjoyed a revival with hugely successful fashion shows, rave reviews and commercial stability. Fashion writer Ann Chubb wrote "It is great to see him right back on form again after a few years in the doldrums".

== 1980s and later ==
Going into the 1980s, fashion—British fashion in particular—turned towards the new punk rock craze. Clothing from Vivienne Westwood's shop on the King's Road became a popular look and one of Malcolm McLaren's "Scum" T-shirt text went so far as to include Ossie Clark under the heading "Hates". Clark's romantic flowing gowns were no longer in fashion. His fortunes declined to bankruptcy and he largely stopped working commercially. Famously devoid of business acumen, he blamed his downfall on banks and the taxman's insistence on cashing in all his assets. His bitterness at this and a short-sighted determination to sit out the bankruptcy term, along with deep depression, meant he worked only on private commissions that were paid for by barter. A loyal band of famous clients and friends would order a dress and pay for it by loaning a holiday house in the Caribbean or paying for his sewing machine to be repaired.

In 1984 he was persuaded by a friend to go back to work with Radley. Clark produced garments with shoulder details based on sea shells but according to his diaries was then sacked by Radley that same year. A note written by Clark to the DHSS (p. 147) says: "I did not leave my position as a dress designer with Firwool of my own accord, as stated overleaf. It was put to me that as my designs weren't selling, they couldn't continue to invest in me and I was given two weeks notice on the 19th of October 1984. I wasn't offered a choice of continuing to work or not—I was fired." This version of events is backed up by a friend, the artist Guy Burch, who recalls that Clark told him Radley had found the complicated shell patterns impossible to make commercially.

Although the 1980s were chaotic and nomadic there were brighter sides to his life charted in his published diaries. In January 1978 he had met his second long-term partner Nicholas Balaban, who was working as a barman at the Sombrero Club in Kensington. With Clark's encouragement Balaban applied to the Byam Shaw School of Art and went on to start his own highly successful fashion business producing printed T-shirts for high-street boutiques and multiples. Although most published accounts choose not to pay much attention to Clark's gay relationships, his sexuality was predominantly homosexual. Clark's continued erratic behaviour eventually led to the relationship's collapse in 1983/84. His depression deepened even more as he obsessed over Balaban, trying unsuccessfully to rekindle the relationship. Only with Balaban's death from AIDS in 1994 and a conversion to Buddhism did Clark finally begin to rebuild a career and shake off the past. In the early 1990s he trained the designer Bella Freud to pattern-cut and an extremely promising new beginning was the use of Clark's mastery of pattern-cutting chiffon and delicate fabrics by the Ghost label. Clark found their computerised pattern cutter a revelation, able to turn initial ideas into formers almost instantaneously.

== Death ==
On 6 August 1996, Ossie Clark was stabbed to death in his council flat, in Kensington and Chelsea, London, by his former lover, 28-year-old Italian, Diego Cogolato. In March 1997, Cogolato was convicted of manslaughter on the grounds of diminished responsibility, and was subsequently jailed for six years.

== Legacy ==
Ossie Clark is featured in David Hockney's 1970 painting Mr and Mrs Clark and Percy. It now hangs in the Tate Britain gallery on Millbank and is one of the most visited paintings in Britain. He also appears prominently in the 1974 Hockney biopic, A Bigger Splash. His diaries, which he began in 1971, were published posthumously by his close friend Lady Henrietta Rous in 1998 as The Ossie Clark Diaries. In 1999–2000, Warrington Museum & Art Gallery held the first retrospective of his work. Another retrospective was held at London's Victoria and Albert Museum in 2003. A book from this show, Ossie Clark: 1965–74, is published by Adrams Books and the V&A Museum.

In November 2007, Marc Worth, the founder of WGSN purchased the name Quorum and announced the re-launch of "Ossie Clark". The re-launched label's first collection, Autumn/Winter 2008/09 collection was shown at the Serpentine Gallery in Kensington, during London Fashion Week in February 2008. Avsh Alom Gur, a graduate of the Central Saint Martins College of Art and Design, was appointed as the Head of Design. In July 2009, it was announced that "due to market conditions" the label was to cease operations yet again.

Fashion designers influenced by Ossie Clark include Anna Sui, John Galliano, Christian Lacroix, Dries Van Noten, Malcolm Hall, Clements Ribeiro, Marc Jacobs, Gucci and Prada. The label Ghost, known for its diaphanous gowns, has also been influenced by Ossie Clark.

Original Ossie Clark pieces have been considered collector's items since the start of the 1990s, especially those designed by Clark/Birtwell.
