= Julie Verhoeven =

British illustrator and designer (born 1969)

- Born: 16 May 1969 (age 57); Sevenoaks, Kent
- Occupations: Illustrator, designer, university academic

Julie Verhoeven (born 16 May 1969) is a British illustrator and designer who has collaborated with brands such as Louis Vuitton, Versace and Peter Jensen. While she is recognised primarily for her work in fashion, she has also contributed illustrations to books, magazines and album covers. Her work has been widely exhibited, including at London's Hayward Gallery. She is a design academic at both Central Saint Martins and the Royal College of Art.

With recurring retro references – particularly to the 1970s and pop culture – her illustrations have been described as "whimsical" and "Rock & Roll meets rainbow". The Institute of Contemporary Arts (ICA) noted that: "Her drawings, sculptures, assemblages, installations and video combine a rawness, at times reminiscent of punk, with a bewildering sensuality and a strong sense of colour and texture".

In a 2008 interview, she said: "For the moment I am doing artist/designer... I would like to be regarded as an artist eventually". In 2012, the Victoria & Albert Museum (V&A) acquired a large archive of her work (over 100 illustrations) for its permanent collection.

== Background and early career ==
Verhoeven studied fashion at Kent Institute of Art & Design (now University for the Creative Arts), graduating in 1987. She worked first as an assistant for John Galliano, and later for Martine Sitbon in Paris.

In 2002, the Gibo by Julie Verhoeven fashion line was first shown at London Fashion Week, returning for the spring 2003 shows.

== Fashion collaborations ==
Following Gibo, Verhoeven focused on consulting and design collaborations. She has worked with many major fashion brands, including Louis Vuitton, Versace, Kangol, Mulberry and H&M. She also worked with Suzanne Clements and Inacio Ribeiro during their design direction at Cacharel.

== Exhibitions ==
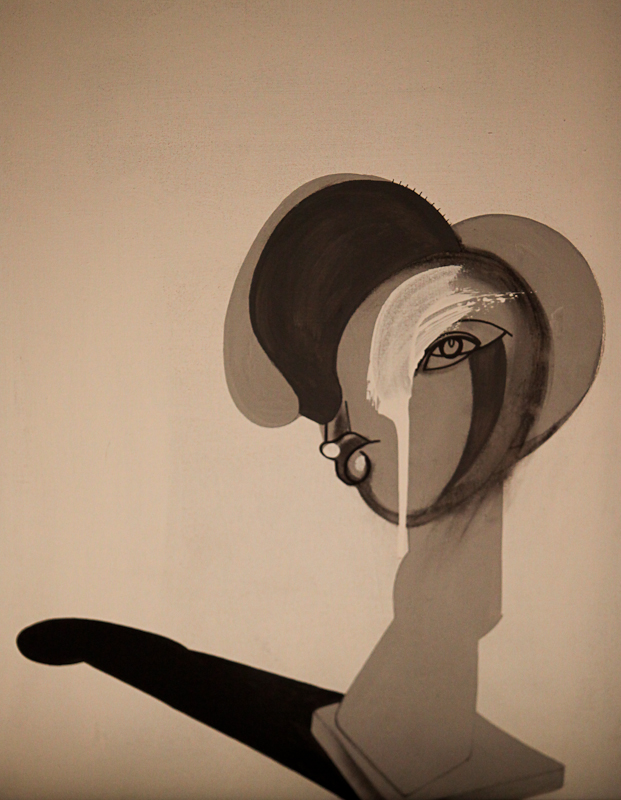
Julie Verhoeven illustration for the exhibition Man enough to be a Woman, 2009 source: Playing Futures: Applied Nomadology

Verhoeven's illustrations have been widely exhibited internationally, including MU, Eindhoven and Vera Gliem, Cologne. London exhibitions included Saint James's in Bloom at the Economist Plaza in 2006. She has also delivered a presentation at the V&A and held an exhibition, Fannying Around, at the Hayward Gallery's space Concrete. In 2013, she designed the artwork and created an installation – Ladies Let's Rip! – for Bath in Fashion 2013 at the Holburne Museum. 2014 activities included a collaborative exhibition with Jimmy Merris at Hordaland Art Centre, Bergen.

=== Academic role ===
Verhoeven combines illustration projects and design collaborations with part-time teaching. She has been a tutor on the MA fashion course at Central Saint Martins since 1996 and teaches on the womenswear programme at the RCA, where she is also an honorary fellow.

=== Selected publications ===
- A Bit of Rough, with text by Spaninks, Angelique (MU Gallery Eindhoven, 2009)
- Gasbook 13 (Gas As Interface Co, 2004)
- Fatbottomedgirls 003, with text by Cole, Bethan (TDM. 2002)
- The Mystery of the Raddlesham Mumps, with text by Murray Lachlan Young (Scotland Street Press, 2018)
