= Clements Ribeiro =

London-based fashion house

- Type: Private company
- Traded as: Clements Ribeiro
- Industry: Fashion
- Founded: London, England (1993)
- Founder: Suzanne Clements, Inacio Ribeiro
- Headquarters: London, England
- Area served: Worldwide
- Key people: Suzanne Clements, Inacio Ribeiro
- Website: www.clementsribeiro.com

Clements Ribeiro is a London-based fashion house established in the early 1990s by husband and wife partnership Suzanne Clements and Inacio Ribeiro. It is known for its feminine designs, bold prints and luxurious knitwear.

Named as one of fashion's 'Magnificent Seven' by Vogue in 1997 (alongside Tom Ford, Miuccia Prada, Valentino, Alexander McQueen, Yohji Yamamoto and Karl Lagerfeld), the label became popular among the Britpop scene. High-profile wearers of the brand have included Adele, Nicole Kidman, Kate Moss and Jarvis Cocker.

== History ==
Brazilian-born Inacio Ribeiro and British-born Suzanne Clements met on their first day at Central Saint Martins, London where they had enrolled on the MA in fashion led by Wendy Dagworthy. Graduating in 1991 with Firsts and marrying a year later, they established their eponymous brand in 1993. In a joint interview with The Independent in 2010, Ribeiro said: "The creation of Clements Ribeiro was a real accident. When we graduated, it was impossible to get a job in London. We went to Milan and hated it, so doing our own thing made sense".

In 1994, they were part of a trip to Japan sponsored by the UK's Department of Trade and Industry; Marks & Spencer and Harvey Nichols sponsored their early London fashion shows and, by 1997, their range was sold in some 15 countries. The label became a stalwart of London Fashion Week and won a New Generation Designers of the Year (NEWGEN) award in 1996. In the same year, the label was nominated for the British Designer of the Year award at the British Fashion Awards, losing out to Alexander McQueen. In 2000, the label was beaten to the title by Hussein Chalayan, who expressed surprise that Clements Ribeiro hadn't won.

== Associations ==
In 2000, Clements and Ribeiro became joint creative directors for French fashion house Cacharel. The seven-year association received critical acclaim and saw Cacharel expand its distribution and collaborate with names such as Celia Birtwell, Peter Saville and Julie Verhoeven. They left Cacharel in summer 2007 and focused on relaunching Clements Ribeiro.

== Design influences ==
Clements Ribeiro is known for eclectic combinations, including bold multicoloured prints, historical references and lavish materials. In particular, the 'Punk Trousseau' collection of 1998 – an edgy reworking of traditional materials such as embroidery, tartan and handmade lace at the height of the Cool Britannia era in UK culture and fashion – garnered international attention and remains influential. The label is also credited with making cashmere popular with a younger audience and with creating one of the most imitated designs of the 1990s – the striped twinset. Clements has characterised their style as "clumsy couture"; the V&A noted their tendency to: "use couture within a ready-to-wear context".

Since 2008, Clements Ribeiro has undertaken a series of projects focused around upcycling alongside its main collection. Projects have included dresses, skirts and shirts made of vintage scarves; 'collage' dresses that combine found fabrics and a collaboration with textile artist Karen Nicol to transform vintage cashmere knitwear with embroidery motifs.

Maintaining its specialism in knitwear, Clements Ribeiro reintroduced a capsule collection of men's sweaters handmade in Scotland in 2013.

== Collaborations ==
Clements and Ribeiro have been described as "masters of designer collaborations". In addition to working with Cacharel, and shoe designers Manolo Blahnik, Jimmy Choo and Christian Louboutin, the duo created designs for Nokia in 2001. The label has also collaborated with a number of other brands, including high-street chains Dorothy Perkins and John Lewis.

Notably for a couture house, Clements Ribeiro began collaborating with plus-size high-street clothing retailer Evans in 2012, producing the Swan range. Fans of its diffusion range for Evans included Adele, who wore one of the designs for a concert in Canada.
