= Alice Pollock =

British fashion designer and retailer (born 1942)

Alice Pollock (born 1942) is a British fashion designer and retailer who founded the boutique Quorum, which featured the work of fellow designers Ossie Clark and Celia Birtwell, and later started the male modelling agency English Boy in London.

== Quorum ==
Pollock founded Quorum in 1964 with the textile designer Celia Birtwell. Her first backer was the theatre producer Michael White, whose wife, the former model Sarah Hillsdon, designed for Quorum until her pregnancy. It was Pollock's second backer, a stockbroker called Michael Armitage, who introduced her to Ossie Clark at his RCA show. This led to the Clark/Pollock design partnership at Quorum where the fashion become more subtle, as the mini was replaced by the midi and maxi hemlines.

Clark has been credited with opening the Quorum boutique with Pollock and he was designing clothes whilst he was still at the Royal College of Art.

Quorum provided a shop window for the work of many young designers, and began featuring Clark's work in 1965. Other Quorum designers included Michael Rainey (before he launched his own boutique Hung On You in winter 1965), Sheridan Barnett, who later launched label Barnett and Brown with Sheilagh Brown and the textile designer Frances Ronaldson, who went on to marry Pollock's ex-husband, Nick Pollock. Pollock designed for the label into the 1970s. She and Clark parted ways in 1973 and Clark and Birtwell's marriage ended the following year.

Quorum's fashion shows were known for their opulence and were popular with celebrities including the Beatles and David Hockney. Radley Gowns purchased the boutique in 1969.

== English Boy ==
In 1966, Pollock and Sir Mark Palmer founded the early male modelling agency English Boy in Chelsea, London, with Palmer as manager. Palmer declared that the agency's aim was "to change the image of British manhood and put the boy, as opposed to the girl, on the magazine cover in the future."

The agency was initially run by Jose Maria Fonseca before she joined forces with April Ducksbury to found their own successful agency, Models 1, in 1968.
