= Malcolm Hall (fashion designer) =

British fashion designer

Malcolm Hall (born Malcolm Halter, on 14 December 1947), is a British fashion designer, known for his flamboyant, tailored suits in velvets, satins, silks and brocades.

== Celebrity following ==
Launched in 1972, the Malcolm Hall label quickly gained a celebrity following.

Malcolm Hall suits were worn by ABBA, according to Simon Sheridan's The Complete ABBA.

The Retro Gallery at MalcolmHall.net displays photographs of rock musicians wearing Malcolm Hall clothes as shown in the table.

Photographs of rock stars wearing Malcolm Hall clothes
Who	What
Paul McCartney	jackets; with guitar ca 1974; and 'Wings era' singing into microphone
Brian Eno	suit ca 1974
Ian Hunter of Mott the Hoople	jacket ca 1973 singing into microphone
Bill Wyman of The Rolling Stones	white suit
Jimmy Page of Led Zeppelin	white suit at the Riot House Hollywood; and another ca 1972
Björn Ulvaeus and Benny Andersson of ABBA	white suits with a baggage trolley at Waterloo station
David Cross of King Crimson	gold suit; playing the fiddle
The Arrows	dark suits; with drum kit on Granada TV show
Billy Preston	white suit; at piano 1975
jacket made for Tony Curtis	"embellished midnight blue velvet jacket" on stand; "sold at auction"
Mud (band)	various suits ca 1974

On 17 September 2011, the Malcolm Hall jacket made for Tony Curtis was sold at the Property from the Estate of Tony Curtis auction.

== National recognition ==
The Manchester Art Gallery's collection theme "Recycled Fashion" explains "Fashion in the early 1970s built on the decorative freedom of the later sixties to produce a riot of vibrantly patterned extravagant clothing for both men and women...English designers like ... Malcolm Hall ... produced superbly tailored and yet imaginative outfits for their wealthier London male clientele".

The Victoria and Albert Museum's national collection "Theatre Costume" includes a "Painted satin and gold cord" stage costume made by Malcolm Hall for Jimmy Page, the flamboyant guitarist of rock group Led Zeppelin (and donated by Page to the museum); the costume, a suit in ivory-coloured satin, is "known as the 'Egyptian' costume because of the symbols prominent on the back of the satin jacket" – the "Eye of Thoth", "Nut (noot), Goddess of the sky"; a winged disk which "some believe ... is based on the appearance of the sun's corona during a solar eclipse." The museum concludes "the ivory satin costume itself would have been highly eye-catching; Page's wild performance style was reflected in his stage outfits."

== Manufacturing ==
As well as his shop in London W1, Malcolm Hall ran a manufacturing operation from his Islington factory, supplying stores worldwide with his ready-to-wear clothes. According to the Malcolm Hall website, the company today still "creates exquisite, rock-inspired, suits in velvets, satins, leathers, silks, denims, and rich brocades, which are shipped internationally."

== Recent developments ==
From 1995 to 2003 Hall collaborated with designers including Catherine Walker on gowns for Princess Diana, Bruce Oldfield and Anouska Hempel.

More recently, Malcolm Hall has been working with private customers in bridal and women's evening wear, as well as relaunching his label with a new rock-inspired collection of suits.

Malcolm Hall serves as expert "consultant fashion designer" to tailoring tutors TutorCouture.

== Bibliography ==
- Catherine Walker. An Autobiography by the Private Couturier to Diana, Princess of Wales, HarperCollins, 1998. ISBN 978-0-00-414055-1
- Simon Sheridan, The Complete Abba, Reynolds & Hearn, 2009. ISBN 978-1-904674-03-0
