= Celia Birtwell =

British textile designer

Celia Birtwell CBE
- Born: 2 January 1941 (age 85); Bury, Lancashire, England
- Known for: Textile and fashion design
- Spouse: Ossie Clark (m. 1969; div. 1974)

Celia Birtwell, CBE (born 1941), is a British textile designer and fashion designer, known for her distinctive bold, romantic and feminine designs, which are influenced by Picasso and Matisse, and the classical world. She was well known for her prints which epitomised the 1960s/70s. Until the arrival of Vivienne Westwood, Birtwell's textile designs dominated the London fashion industry.

After a period away from the limelight, she returned to fashion in the early 21st century.

== Career ==
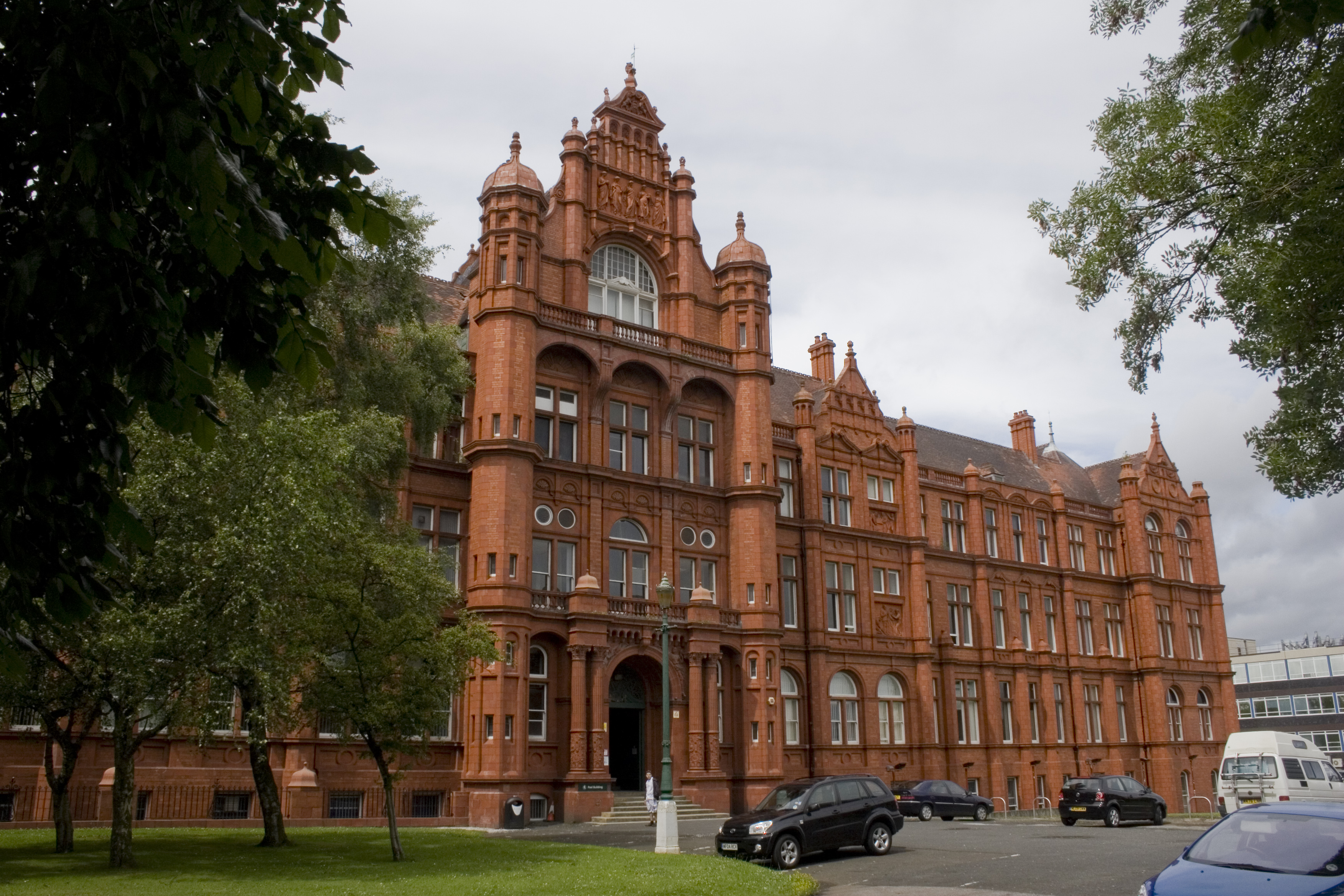
The Peel Building, University of Salford, formerly the Royal Technical College, Salford

The eldest of three children, all daughters, born to a culture-loving engineer and a seamstress, Birtwell was born in Bury and raised in Prestwich, both then in Lancashire. From the age of 13 she studied textile design at the Royal Technical College, Salford. In an interview for BBC television's Inside Out North West in January 2014, Birtwell remembered attending parties and life classes with nude models on the top floor of the Technical College (pictured) and often seeing artist L.S. Lowry, a former student who often visited the college and the adjacent Salford Library. In 1959 she met the fashion designer Ossie Clark in the Cona Coffee Bar in Manchester, and they married in 1969 after being reintroduced when they both studied in London.

== Ossie Clark ==
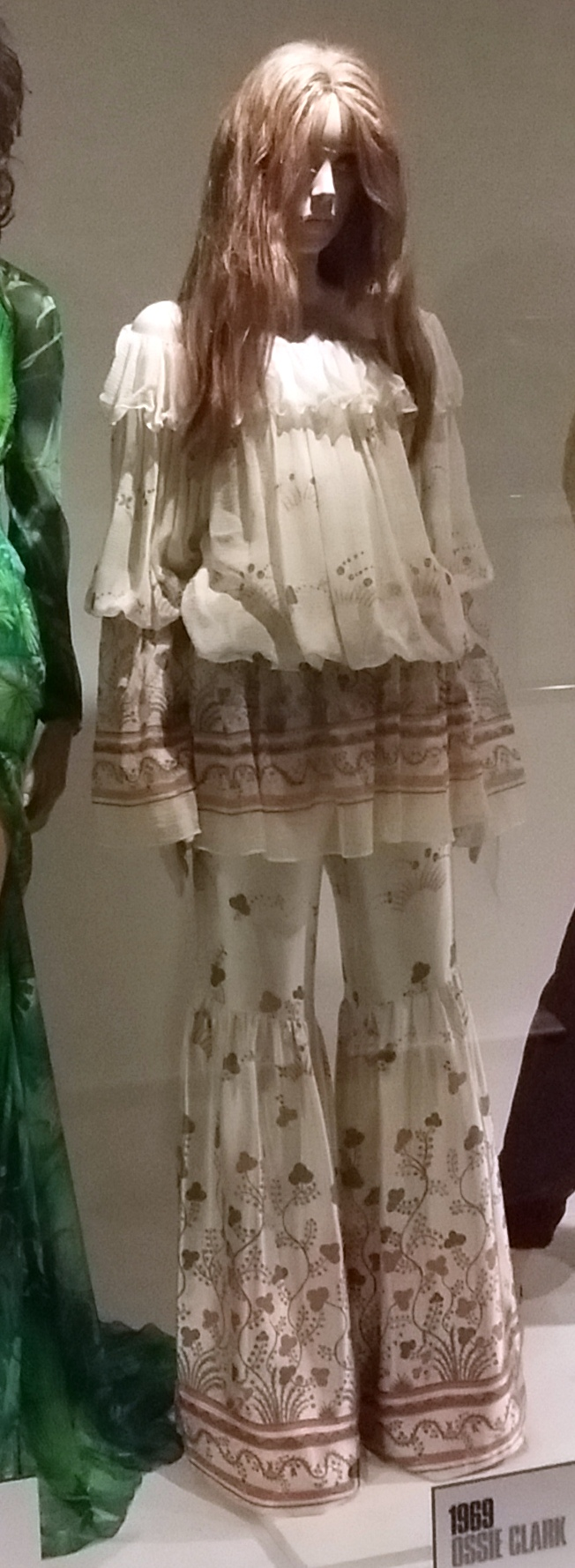
Ossie Clark chiffon and satin trouser suit in Celia Birtwell's 'Botticelli' print, 1969

Celia Birtwell and Ossie Clark's was an almost perfect marriage of style, and their work together helped define the era. The collaboration began with a 1966 collection for the Quorum boutique in London, which they shared with the designer Alice Pollock. It was the Clarks who began the modern catwalk show: the previous procession of modelled clothes was put to music, the London glitterati were invited, and the shows became events.

He was a genius, better than Yves Saint Laurent. His cut – although he lifted it from the 1930s, he had his own take on it – even plump women felt pretty in. He didn't dress just the slimmest, which is always easier. I thought his garments were wonderful. I used to see [their] construction and the way he'd get excited about how he'd put a new sleeve in. He was a real artist. – Celia Birtwell

Birtwell worked at home designing textiles for Clark, who would use his skill in cutting and understanding of form, together with her knowledge of fabrics and textures to produce haute couture for the 1960s culture. This included work for the Rolling Stones and Beatles, Jimi Hendrix and Pink Floyd, as well as Pattie Boyd, Marianne Faithfull, Bianca Jagger, Verushka, Paloma Picasso, Talitha Getty and numerous other celebrities.

== Family ==
Celia and Ossie had two children together, Albert (born 1969) and George (born 1971), but their private relationship deteriorated and they divorced in 1974.

== David Hockney ==
She has been a muse for the painter David Hockney since 1968, and features in many of his paintings including Mr and Mrs Clark and Percy (1970–71), one of Hockney's most celebrated and one of the most viewed paintings in the Tate Britain gallery. In 2005, it featured on the Today programme's shortlist of the Greatest Painting in Britain. She appears in the 1974 Hockney biopic, A Bigger Splash, and the 1978 BBC documentary Seeing Through Drawing produced by Mike Dibb.

== Interiors and furnishing fabric ==
After the break-up of her marriage, Birtwell continued in fashion, designing for the Radley label for a time, until in 1984 she set up a shop on Westbourne Park Road in Bayswater, selling fabrics for the home. Again she built up a reputation for innovative and witty design. Her first success came with her own take on a 16th-century animal print she called 'Animal Solo', followed later by the first, and much copied, white on white voile and muslin fabrics. These fabrics are now to be seen in many homes, hotels and public spaces, including Claridge's and The Lanesborough hotels in London, The Grand Hotel, Leeds, and the Dubai Hilton.

== Recent work ==
Birtwell produced designs for French fashion house Cacharel while it was under the design direction of Suzanne Clements and Inacio Ribeiro. In 2005, it was announced that she would design clothing for the high street chain Topshop, beginning with Spring/Summer 2006. The four collections were a sell-out success. In April 2008, Birtwell designed a limited collection for American fashion retailer Express. In 2008, Millets launched a camping and outdoor footwear and clothing range which she had designed. New lines were added to the range for Summer 2009. In 2010, she created a 25-piece collection for John Lewis.

Her book Celia Birtwell, written with Dominic Lutyens, featuring photographs, fashion sketches and memoir, was published by Quadrille in 2011. 250 limited edition fabric covered box sets which included a signed copy of her book, and an exclusive silk scarf, were also produced.

Birtwell was the castaway on Desert Island Discs on BBC Radio 4 on Sunday 7 October 2012.

== Honours ==
She was appointed Commander of the Order of the British Empire (CBE) in the 2011 Birthday Honours.
