= Isaac Kaye =

British businessman

- Citizenship: United Kingdom; South Africa
- Occupations: Businessperson; Chemist

Isaac Kaye is a businessman with interests in healthcare and politics in the United Kingdom. Originally from South Africa, he obtained Irish citizenship upon his arrival in the UK in 1985.

== Healthcare ==
Kaye built Norton Healthcare Ltd., a UK generic pharmaceutical company, which was acquired by Ivax Corporation in 1990. He became chairman of Ivax Pharmaceuticals UK. In 2006 Ivax was sold to Teva Pharmaceuticals for $7.4 billion.

In 2002 Ivax was the largest supplier of generic drugs to the NHS.

Kaye was also a co-founder of Israel Healthcare Ventures, an Israel-based venture capital firm, and also established the Kaye Innovation Awards in order to encourage and recognize technological achievements at the Hebrew University of Jerusalem

== Politics ==
In January 2008 his name was listed as one of the donors to Peter Hain's May 2007 election campaign for the deputy leadership of the Labour Party. Kaye's donation of £15,000, undeclared as a donation by Hain at the time, was channelled through the Progressive Policies Forum organization. Kaye, along with David Garrard, sponsors the annual lunch of the Labour Friends of Israel.
