= Fashion forecasting =

Prediction of future fashion trends

Fashion forecasting aims to predict the moods of society and consumers, along with their behavior and buying habits and bases what they may release in the coming future off of the forecast. Fashion trends tend to repeat themselves every 20 years, and fashion forecasting predicts what other trends might begin with the rotation of fashion as well. Fashion forecasting began in France during the reign of Louis XIV. It started as a way of communicating about fashion and slowly transformed into a means to get ahead of the times in the fashion industry.

Fashion forecasting can be used for many different reasons, the main reason being staying on top of current trends and knowing what the consumer is going to want in the future. This method helps fashion brands know what to expect and what to begin producing ahead of time. Top name brands and high end companies such as Vogue and Gucci even use this method to help their designers become even more informed on what is to come in the fashion industry.

In 1947, textile engineer Fred Carlin established the very first style and trend-forecasting agency in Paris: the Carlin agency. In 1966, Promostyl was founded, led by Françoise Vincent-Ricard. Then, in 1968, the style agency Mafia was created by Maïmé Arnodin and Denise Fayolle. In 1970, Dominique Peclers founded her own agency, which would later become Peclers Paris. In 1975, Li Edelkoort, who is of Dutch origin, moved to Paris and subsequently established Trend Union. In 1985, Nelly Rodi launched a trend-consulting firm bearing her own name.

== Overview ==
Fashion forecasting is a global career that focuses on upcoming fashion trends. A fashion forecaster predicts the colors, patterns, fabrics, textures, materials, prints, graphics, beauty grooming, accessories, footwear, street styles, and many other styles that will be presented on different runway shows and in stores in upcoming seasons. The concept applies to not one but every single level of the fashion industry from smaller box stores like Urban Planet to massive high end fashion companies like PRADA. The fashion forecast process includes basic steps of understanding the vision of the business and profile of target customers, collecting information about available merchandise, preparing information, determining trend, and choosing merchandise appropriate for the company and target customers. For example, fashion trend forecasting saw trends for 2022 consisting of oversize shirts and sweatshirts, with a continuation of the puff sleeve trend, and dresses and tops retaining their volume through to the end of the year.

Fashion forecasting consists of many different parts in order for it to be effective. There is long-term forecasting, which is the process of analyzing and evaluating trends that can be identified by scanning many different sources for information, and ensuring that the trend is lasting for over two years. Then there is short-term forecasting which focuses on current events both domestically and internationally as well as pop culture in order to identify possible trends that can be communicated to customers through different color plates, fabric, etc.

Long-term forecasting is the process of analyzing and evaluating trends that can be identified by scanning a variety of sources for information. It is a fashion which lasts over two years. When scanning the market and the consumers, fashion forecasters must follow demographics of certain areas, both urban and suburban, as well as examine the impact on retail and its consumers due to the economy, political system, environment, and culture. Long-term forecasting seeks to identify: major changes in international and domestic demographics, shifts in the fashion industry along with market structures, consumer expectations, values, and impulsion to buy, new developments in technology and science, and shifts in the economic, political, and cultural alliances between certain countries. There are many specialized marketing consultants that focus on long-term forecasting and attend trade shows and other events that notify the industry on what is to come. Any changes in demographics and psychographics that are to affect the consumers needs and which will influence a company's business and particular niche market are determined.

== Short-term forecasting ==
Short-term forecasting focuses on current events both domestically and internationally as well as pop culture in order to identify possible trends that can be communicated to the customer through the seasonal color palette, fabric, and silhouette stories. It gives fashion a modern twist to a classic look that intrigues our eyes. Some important areas to follow when scanning the environment are: current events, art, sports, science and technology. Short-term forecasting can also be considered fad forecasting.

== Difference between short-term and long-term forecasting ==
Two types of fashion forecasting are used: short-term forecasting, which envisions trends one to two years in the future and focuses on new product features such as color, textile, and style and long-term forecasting, which predicts trends five or more years out and focuses on the directions of the fashion industry with regard to materials, design production and retailing. Long-term forecasts contribute to a fashion firm's development strategies and help it make decisions related to repositioning or extending product lines, initiating new business, and reviving brand images.

== Responsibility for trend forecasting ==
Each retailer's trend forecasting varies and is mainly dependent upon whether the company is a wholesale brand or private label developer. "Every season, there are hundreds of designers showing breathtaking collections that the average consumer will never see. What does matter is who sees them—the in-house designers and buyers at fast fashion retailers, people who are paying close attention, identifying and predicting which styles, patterns and cuts will appeal to the average woman."

Larger companies such as Forever 21 have their own trend departments where they follow the styles, fabrics, and colors for the upcoming seasons. This can also be referred to as vertical integration. A company with its own trend department has a better advantage than those who do not because its developers are able to work together to create a unified look for their sales floor. Each seasonal collection offered by a product developer is the result of trend research focused on the target market it has defined for itself.

Product developers may offer anywhere from two to six seasonal collections per year, depending on the impact of fashion trends in a particular product category and price point. Women's wear companies are more sensitive to the whims of fashion and may produce four to six lines a year. Men's wear companies present two to four lines a year, and children's wear firms typically present three to four seasonal collections. For each season a collection is designed by the product developers and is based on a specific theme, which is linked to the color and fabric story.

A merchandiser also plays a key role in the direction of upcoming trends. Different from developers, merchandisers have much more experience in buying and are knowledgeable in what consumers will be looking for. The designer takes the particular trends and then determines the styles, silhouettes and colors for the line and garments while creating an overall theme for the particular season.

The higher classes' clothes start to lose their distinctiveness as the lower classes progressively emulate them. When this happens, new concepts that serve as the new class markers must take the place of the current trends. As a result, the upper classes start to influence the growth of fashion, while the lower classes serve as “replicators”.

Individual bloggers also contribute to fashion forecasting and influence designers and product teams.

== Various ways to forecast trends ==
The classical way for fashion brands and agencies to forecast trends is by analyzing runway shows, trade shows, newspapers & magazines' information, and market research In the past, these sources were the only ones available to fashion forecasters and brands and retailers would use this information to plan their future collections. But the fashion industry has changed, and descriptive analytics is now accompanied by prescriptive and predictive analytics. The Internet, and consequently, social media, has accelerated the life cycle of trends and birthed phenomena like fast fashion and global supply chains. Trend virality, time-to-market speed, and consumer behavior has shifted in the last decade as a result of the digital age. There are now fashion forecasting services using new technologies and mostly AI, to predict what's coming next Artificial intelligence in fashion forecasting is often used to analyze text and hashtags on social media, online collections published by brands and magazines, and consumer behavior on e-commerce. On social media, machine learning is another way that AI is used to forecast fashion trends. This is the algorithmic process of analyzing a large database of images to determine the many different features of clothing and accessories. This raw data can then be translated into trend forecasts with human intervention, from determining a trend’s online visibility to its future market demand. Artificial intelligence has many applications in fashion forecasting that touch product assortment, customer behavior, design processes, marketing, and more. The growing importance of social media and customer perception has quickened the adoption pace of AI in fashion forecasting.

== Demand forecasting ==
One of the most significant challenges confronting retailers and wholesalers in any sector is demand forecasting. Businesses may make informed judgments regarding pricing and company expansion plans thanks to the vital information that accurate demand forecasting provides about prospective earnings in their present market. Future sales may be lost if demand is overestimated; on the other hand, if suppliers are left with a surplus, significant discount strategies may be required, potentially resulting in losses and cash flow difficulties.

Demand forecasting is particularly complicated in the fashion business because of seasonal trends, a lack of data, and overall unpredictability.

Numerous factors must be considered by a smart fashion forecaster, including the political and economic context, geographical demography, customer expectations, market trends, internal corporate plans, and many more. Projecting previous patterns into the future and seeking indicators of change in order to anticipate impending events are the two basic objectives of "forecasting" in this context.

== Forecasting methods ==
=== Usual methods ===
The primary building block of usual methods is typically a standard forecast, taken from a particular piece of software or the sales from the previous year. The practitioner then revises this standard by taking into consideration the explanatory factors. Pros of this method are that the influence of seasonality and the primary explanatory factors might make the outcome highly accurate. Cons of this method are that if there are too many variables being processed, the analysis will become inaccurate and difficult, making the task exceedingly tiresome. In addition to this, if there are too many elements, the findings will vary depending on the operator's level of expertise.

=== Advanced methods ===
The existence of historical data is the first factor to consider while developing a forecasting model.

The fashion industry tends to need forecasts at two levels of data aggregation:

The "family level" allows businesses to plan and arrange mid-term purchases, manufacturing, and supply since it consists of products from the same category (T-shirts, trousers, etc.). There is often historical data for this level of aggregation.

To restock and distribute goods in stores over a shorter time horizon, the "SKU level" is essential. References (SKU) are fleeting since they are made for a single season only. As a result, historical data are unavailable.

== Bibliography ==
1. "Fashion Forecasting & Trend Resources." UC Libraries | University of Cincinnati. Web. 10 April 2011. <http://libraries.uc.edu/libraries/daap/resources/researchguides/design/forecasting.html>.
2. "Forecasting Fashion Trends : NPR." NPR : National Public Radio : News & Analysis, World, US, Music & Arts : NPR. Web. 10 April 2011. https://www.npr.org/2003/09/17/1432978/forecasting-fashion-trends.
3. Keiser, Sandra J., and Myrna B. Garner. Beyond Design: the Synergy of Apparel Product Development. New York: Fairchild Publications, 2008. Print.
4. Miller, Claire Cain. Designers of High Fashion Enter the Age of High Tech: New York Times . 8 September 2008. <https://www.nytimes.com/2008/09/08/technology/08trend.html?pagewanted=print&_r=0>.
5. "Fashion Trends: Analysis and Forecasting" Kim Eundeok Fiore (2013-05-09)
6. "The Fashion Forecasters - a Hidden History of Color and Trend Prediction", edited by Regina Lee Blaszczyk and Ben Wubbs, 275 pages, published by Bloomsbury
7. Svendsen, L., & Irons, J. (2006). Fashion: A Philosophy. Reaktion Books.
8. Gardino, G. B., Meo, R., & Craparotta, G. (2020). Multi-view Latent Learning Applied to Fashion Industry. Information Systems Frontiers, 23(1), 53–69. https://doi.org/10.1007/s10796-020-10005-8
9. Choi, T. M., Hui, C. L., & Yu, Y. (Eds.). (2014). Intelligent Fashion Forecasting Systems: Models and Applications. Scholars Portal Books. https://doi.org/10.1007/978-3-642-39869-8

== See also ==
- Demographics
- Psychographics
- Niche market
