= Cathy McGowan (presenter) =

British broadcaster and journalist

- Born: Cathy McGowan
- Spouse: Hywel Bennett (m. 1970; div. 1988)
- Partner: Michael Ball (1992–present)
- Children: Emma Bennett

Cathy McGowan (born circa 1945) is a British broadcaster and journalist, best known as a presenter of the 1960s pop music television show Ready Steady Go!

== Ready Steady Go! ==
Ready Steady Go! (RSG) was first broadcast in August 1963, coinciding with the rise of the Beatles in Britain and internationally. As one historian of television reflected in the 1970s, "the revolution had the greatest possible effect on television ... and hindsight commentators were to see the year (1963) as a line of demarcation drawn between one kind of Britain and another".

With its slogan, "the weekend starts here", RSG was shown on Fridays from 6 to 7 pm. Its original presenter Keith Fordyce (1928–2011), a stalwart of the BBC Light Programme and Radio Luxembourg, was joined in 1964 by McGowan and Michael Aldred. McGowan, recruited as an advisor from 600 applicants, had been in the fashion department of Woman's Own. She is said to have secured the role in a "run off" with journalist Anne Nightingale, later a Radio 1 disc jockey, by answering "fashion" to a question from Elkan Allan (1922–2006), RSG's executive producer and head of entertainment at Rediffusion, as to whether sex, music or fashion was most important to teenagers.

McGowan seemed in tune with the times, "the girl of the day", according to Eric Burdon of the Animals – and, through her fashion sense, acquired the nickname, "Queen of the Mods". (This term has been applied to others, such as Dusty Springfield and, in New Zealand, Dinah Lee.) Much of her appeal lay in the fact that she was the age of RSG's viewers: young women regarded her as a role model, while men were attracted by her looks. Anna Wintour, future editor of American Vogue, was, according to her biographer Jerry Oppenheimer, among teenagers whom the show introduced to fashion. Another, Lesley Hornby, who became better known as Twiggy, regarded McGowan as her heroine: "I'd sit and drool over her clothes. She was a heroine to us because she was one of us".

A similar empathy extended to the artists that McGowan interviewed. Donovan, launched in 1965 by his appearances on RSG, recalled McGowan as the "young Mary Quant-look hostess" (Quant being the leading British proponent of the mini-skirt, which McGowan helped popularise), with whom he developed an "easy-going" style of on-screen conversation. In the words of Dominic Sandbrook, a social historian:

The show's most celebrated presenter, McGowan was the same age as the national audience; she wore all the latest trendy shifts and mini-dresses; and she spoke with an earnest, ceaseless barrage of teenage slang, praising whatever was 'fab' or 'smashing', and damning all that was 'square' or 'out'. 'The atmosphere', one observer wrote later, 'was that of a King's Road party where the performers themselves had only just chanced to drop by'.

McGowan was an early patron of Biba, whose first store opened in September 1964, and had her own fashion range at British Home Stores. She endorsed a portable make-up set known as "Cathy's Survival Kit". Barbara Hulanicki, who founded Biba, observed that "the girls aped Cathy's long hair and eye-covering fringe and soon their little faces were growing heavy with stage make-up". Julia Baird, half-sister of John Lennon of the Beatles, recalled how, despite wearing black eye make-up, black polo necks and dyed black jeans "à la Cathy McGowan", she was unable to convince doormen at the Cavern Club in Liverpool, where the Beatles came to prominence, that she was over 18, the age for admission. It has been claimed that the formation in 1966 of a British Society for the Preservation of the Miniskirt was prompted by McGowan's indicating that she would wear a long skirt on RSG.

After Fordyce's departure in March 1965, McGowan continued to present RSG until it ended on 23 December 1966. In 1965 a decision that artists should perform live gave it immediacy that its BBC rival, Top of the Pops (1964–2006), never acquired; indeed, the latter retained a Mancunian model, Samantha Juste – in television, McGowan's rival – as its "disc girl" until 1967. Although RSG's momentum had begun to flag, its impact on music and, through McGowan, on the "swinging" '60s more generally was widely acknowledged. As Sandbrook put it, "Thanks to the enthusiastic salesmanship of McGowan and her fellow presenters, the emerging youth culture that had once been confined to the capital [London] or to the great cities could now be seen and copied almost immediately from Cornwall to the Highlands". The musician and jazz critic George Melly thought RSG "made pop music work on a truly national scale ... It was almost possible to feel a tremour of pubescent excitement from Land's End to John O'Groats".

McGowan, who was a 5 ft 4½in (1.64m) brunette, modelled and also presented a show on Radio Luxembourg.

== After Ready Steady Go! ==
Once RSG had ended, McGowan's star began to wane. By way of illustration, The Sunday Times, previewed an exhibition 40 years later of photographs by Patrick Lichfield who described Queen's use of his shots in 1967:

[Lichfield] was ... a great one for persuading people to join in, even if the outcome was not always the one they expected. In the 1960s he took a series of group portraits for Queen magazine supposedly documenting the movers and shakers of the time – except that some, such as Jonathan Aitken and Cathy McGowan, were deemed not to be "in", and were labelled as "out" in the magazine. But Lichfield, with his impeccable manners, refused to upset his subjects by letting them know that in advance.

However, in 1978, McGowan was the subject of a tribute: the song "Ready Steady Go" by the English band Generation X contained the line "Because I'm in love with Cathy McGowan." The single hit no. 47 on the UK charts. The social historian Alwyn W. Turner has cited the band's "hymning" of McGowan as an example of punk's indebtedness to mod culture. She was also prominently seen in the video for the 1978 Elton John hit "Part-Time Love", having known John since the 1960s when, as Reg Dwight, he had been a member of Bluesology, the backing band for Long John Baldry.

=== Later work ===
McGowan continued in journalism and broadcasting. She was a board member of London's Capital Radio when it was launched in 1973. In the late 1980s she worked for the BBC's Newsroom South East, specialising in entertainment. She interviewed celebrities, including some she had known in the 1960s and others such as singer Michael Ball, who became her partner, and Deborah Harry, lead singer of Blondie, whom she described as the most beautiful woman she had met. McGowan hosted the Brit Awards in 1990. In 1991, McGowan co-hosted, with Alexei Sayle and Jonathan Ross, a show by British comedians to mark the 30th anniversary of Amnesty International. According to her partner Ball, McGowan "genuinely isn't interested" in media work, and "hasn't given an interview since (they) met and never will", being focused on her daughter and grandchildren.

== Family ==
In 1967, McGowan married actor Hywel Bennett. They had a daughter. The marriage was dissolved in 1988 and, since the early 1990s, she has been the partner of Michael Ball. Ball is godfather to McGowan's grandson, Connor Bennett.

McGowan's brother John McGowan was a disc jockey in 1965 on King Radio, a pirate radio station broadcasting from a fort in the Thames Estuary.
