= Jim Lee (photographer) =

British photographer and film director (1945–2023)

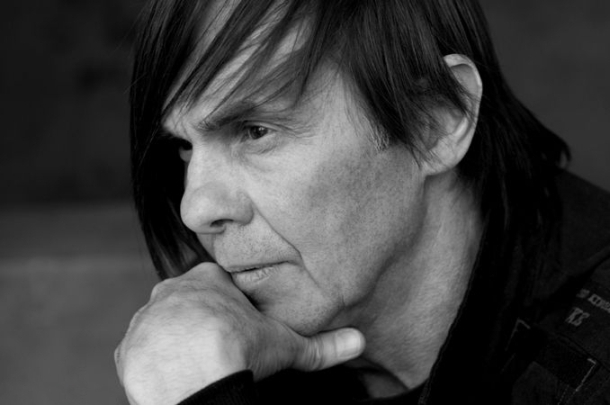
- Born: James Seymour Lee; 20 November 1945; London, England
- Died: 31 July 2023 (aged 77)
- Occupations: Photographer, film director
- Known for: Fashion art
- Spouse: Loli Mcilvenny

James Seymour Lee (20 November 1945 – 31 July 2023) was a British photographer and film director based in London. A fashion photographer for magazines during the late sixties and seventies, he worked closely with Vogue editor-in-chief Anna Wintour in London and New York on fashion and advertising shoots. He switched to film directing in the late seventies, creating hundreds of television commercials as well as working on several full-length feature films. His earlier photographs form part of the permanent collection at the Victoria and Albert Museum, with additional photographs in the archives of The Multimedia Art Museum, Moscow. A book of his life's work entitled Jim Lee / Arrested was launched in May 2012 alongside an exhibition of photographs from the book at Somerset House, London. Lee's work is regularly exhibited at art galleries around the world, and he continued to collaborate on imaginative campaigns, in addition to developing his own creative projects. In September 2015, Lee's autobiographical book LIFE IN B&W was released by Quartet at the Groucho Club in London. In 2016, Lee was a speaker at the Oxford Literary Festival, where he was also interviewed by writer Paul Blezard. In October 2018, Lee's latest book, The BOX, was published by The Box Book Company. In 2019, Lee published My BOX, a version of The BOX for children between the ages of 8–15 years.

== Early life ==
Lee was born in London on 20 November 1945; his parents were both operatives in MI5. Due to a combination of dyslexia and a strong sense of independence, Lee did not follow the established family route through Eton and Cambridge, instead attending the experimental Down House School in Sussex, leaving at 16.

Denied a visa to the US on age grounds, Lee emigrated to Australia under the assisted passage Ten Pound Poms scheme in 1962. After traveling around the outback for a year, he settled in Sydney, where the Dutch-born photographer Jon van Gaalen provided him with board and lodging in return for his assistance with developing negatives. This association helped to spark Lee's own interest in photography, and he began working as a freelance photojournalist, covering performances by the Beatles and the Rolling Stones, with his work appearing regularly in the Sydney Morning Herald. At the age of 18 he had a shot of his then girlfriend, the Australian fashion model Bronwyn Steven-Jones, published in Australian Vogue.

== Fashion art photographer ==
In 1965, Lee was drafted into the Australian Army to fight in the Vietnam War, but through his parents' interventions (on grounds of national security), he was able to return to the UK. He spent the next two years at the Webber Douglas Academy of Dramatic Art in London and continued to build his portfolio, photographing bands including the Kinks and the Who, and securing jobs for fashion clients keen to be seen in the colour supplements then new in British newspapers.

As his reputation grew, Lee began working on shoots for clients in the fashion industry, taking on bigger work, and by 1968, he was working full-time as a fashion photographer for some of the biggest fashion designers of the time including Ossie Clark, Yves Saint Laurent and Gianni Versace, with his spreads featuring regularly in editorials in the national press and fashion magazines including Fashion, Elle and The Sunday Times. A two-year move to Paris in 1970, working for Vingt Ans and Photo magazines, and continuing to correspond for the British publications, let Lee expand his contacts and reputation in the fashion industry.

By 1973, Lee was working extensively with Jennifer Hocking, the editor of Harpers & Queen, and later agreed to work with Anna Wintour, then an assistant fashion editor, on a shoot for the magazine. Impressed by her innovative approach, he soon formed a strong working relationship with her, also working on distinctive advertising shoots for clients including Coca-Cola, Guinness and American Express. Lee followed Wintour to New York City in 1975 and continued to collaborate, producing shoots for Viva (where she was now the fashion editor) for clients such as Saks Fifth Avenue and Bloomingdale's. A success in New York as he had been in London and Paris, Lee produced a 40-page fashion supplement for The New York Times in 1976, and his work was also featured in Interview.

When Lee produced a photo booklet titled 'Young Lovers' in June 1975, he decided to promote it using posters on the sides of London buses. Intrigued by his novel use of the unconventional space and keen to demonstrate the creative opportunities available, the London Transport Board gave Lee a hundred bus-sides for a year to use for advertising campaigns. Starting with a dramatic poster for Nikon, featuring Lee's own distinctive gold toothed smile in close up, he used the space to display prominently signed shots for clients including Austin Reed, British Rail and Pringle of Scotland; making headlines when he put a full frontal nude on the side of the Number 19 buses for French Connection.

=== Style and themes ===
Described as "England's answer to Guy Bourdin" and with influences including Helmut Newton, Lee's images have artistic merit, consistently showing high production values and a strong narrative. Lee rarely did studio or portrait work, relishing the creative freedom available at Harpers as opposed to the "do it the 'Vogue way" approach that prevailed at many other publications.

Lee experimented with various photographic styles over his career. Many of his earliest shots were characterised by a gritty, photojournalistic feel, such as Baader-Meinhoff 1969, featuring an elegantly dressed model carrying a submachine gun in place of a handbag, and Ossie Clark/Vietnam 1969, "in which a uniformed and helmeted GI has grabbed hold of a girl modelling a brilliantly dappled Ossie Clark outfit and looking like a Baroque saint in ecstasy."

By the mid-seventies, much of Lee's work displayed a more romantic, soft-focus approach, similar to that of Sarah Moon and Deborah Turbeville, such as the hazy Selfridges/Bathers 1976 and the poignant Reflections 1975. Often displaying a surreal aspect, his Austin Reed/Rome 1976 appears to show men diving out of a swimming pool, whilst Ossie Clark/Aeroplane 1969 has the model wearing a floaty Ossie Clark dress, flying towards her mirror image flanked by a pair of fighter aircraft.

More interested in stories and girls than the clothes themselves, Lee's highly cinematic images suggested further intrigue. One fashion shoot, with models cajoling fighters in a boxing ring surrounded by seedy onlookers, was a result of Lee paying some regulars to stay there all night "to get the ring smoky and be there in the morning drunk".

== Film director ==
Lee returned to Britain in 1978 to pursue a career as a film director, initially producing television commercials before going on to direct full-length feature film productions. Lee's first commercial was for Levi's, and work for Elizabeth Arden and Coty's Sophia perfume soon followed, but his repertoire swiftly grew to encompass many of the biggest brands including Visa, BMW and Shell. Lee was in the useful position of being able to offer clients both commercials and stills with just a single production.

Over the next few years, Lee went on to direct many hundreds of commercials. These included the big budget 'Hats Off' productions for the British Airways privatisation campaign in 1987, with other industry award-winning commercials including the 'Gone to America' series for Thomas' English Muffins and 'Brideshead Revisited' series for Black and Decker, as well as campaigns for Royal Mail, Lindt, Saab, Esso and Johnnie Walker.

Working at first for Spots Films in Soho, Lee joined Paul Weiland in 1980 to create Weiland and Lee, which grew quickly, taking on further directors including David Bailey and Richard Curtis. With John Henderson he set up the Lee Henderson Film Company in 1983, eventually forming his own production company, The Jim Lee Film Company, in 1989, working out of the St James's area of London.

In 1992, Lee directed the full-length feature film, Losing Track. Written by Roger Eldridge, and starring Alan Bates, it was screened at a number of film festivals and was shown in Britain as part of the BBC's Screen One strand, receiving generally positive reviews Set in the Black Mountains in Wales in the 1950s, the film follows the efforts of a former civil servant in Colonial India to re-engage with his estranged son following the death of his wife.

In addition to working on several other feature films, Lee continued to direct television commercials for clients around the world. In 1999, he was commissioned to produce a sixty-second commercial for Kingdom Holding Company controlled by Prince Al Waleed bin Talal, nephew of the Saudi Arabian King Abdullah. The production involved the use of over 50 helicopters for an 18-week reconnaissance and shoot at multiple locations around the world, followed by a massive three months in post-production. It cost over £4m to make, making it one of the most expensive to date. The prince's unpopular comments on the September 11 attacks were one reason why it was withdrawn without ever being aired.

== Revival of interest ==
In 2003, Lee spotted one of his own early photographs in the V&A Magazine, promoting an upcoming exhibit based on the work of the fashion designer Ossie Clark. On contacting the museum, which had originally received the uncredited photo from Clark's former wife Celia Birtwell, he was invited to submit several more images to be displayed in the exhibition held at the Victoria and Albert Museum between July 2003 and May 2004.

The renewed interest in Lee's work was continued in 2005 through the Nikon sponsored "Eye for Images" exhibition held at the Firehouse Club in South Kensington, featuring some of his earlier works, archived and printed by the photography department at the Royal College of Art. Supported by London Fashion Week, the show was widely reviewed in the television and print media, made the national evening news and was accompanied by an eight-page spread in The Sunday Times Magazine. The exhibition went on to tour around Europe, displayed at venues including the Galleria Carla Sozzani in Milan, the Galeria Moriarty in Madrid and the Paris Photo art fair in France.

Lee's works were subsequently displayed at the Hamiltons Gallery in Mayfair in 2007. Titled "Jim Lee 69", the retrospective highlighted some of Lee's earlier shots. The Victoria and Albert Museum also selected several additional pieces for the fashion section of their permanent collection.

== Later activities ==
Lee collaborated on a variety of creative projects in later years, including shoots for Björn Borg's fashion label, spreads for Tank Magazine, The Observer (most latterly in October 2012) and 34 Magazine, and the artwork for Morten Harket's 2008 album, Letter from Egypt. He also worked with The Independent from 2002, covering fashion shows by designers including Alexander McQueen, Zandra Rhodes and Valentino.

Lee's work was presented at the American International Fine Art Fair in February 2013, featuring on the cover of the official 2013 catalogue, followed by a month-long exhibition at the Holden Lundtz Gallery in Palm Beach, Florida. Further launches and exhibitions have continued worldwide, including at the Ekaterina Cultural Fondation in Moscow in early 2013.

Lee later worked on the production of Ten Quid Cowboy, an autobiographical film based on his adventures in Australia as a teenager, with a screenplay written by Scott Roberts, the writer behind adventure films such as K2 and The Hard Word. Among his last films in development were The Home Front with a screenplay by the late playwright Simon Gray, and Hey Diddle Diddle, written by the Russian presenter Seva Novgorodsev.

== Death ==
Jim Lee died from cancer on 31 July 2023, at the age of 77.

== Book releases ==
My BOX

A version of The BOX for children from 8–15 years, published 2019 by The Box Book Company. An audio book version of My BOX, read by Geraldine James, was released in 2020.

The BOX

Jim Lee's book The BOX was launched in October 2018, published by The Box Book Company. Lee wrote the book as a method to help others get over problems that cannot be solved in one go. The audio book version of The BOX was released in 2020, read by Richard E Grant.

=== Jim Lee / Arrested ===
May 2012 saw the launch of a 288-page coffee table book entitled Jim Lee / Arrested, published by Ammonite Press (ISBN 978-1-90770-812-1), at the auction house, Phillips de Pury, in London. A biographical life story, written by Peter York with a foreword by art critic Barry Schwabsky, the book contains a selection of photographs and movie clips from his fifty years working as a photographer and film director. This was followed by a photographic exhibition of 35 pictures from the book at Somerset House, London.

=== LIFE IN B&W ===
In September 2015 was the launch of LIFE IN B&W (ISBN 978-0704373891), an autobiographical hardback book holding the memoirs of Jim Lee. The book was launched in the Groucho Club, London and published by Quartet. This memoir contains personal photography and gives a real insight into the life of the photographer and film maker.

== Press ==
Independent on Sunday 4 page article: 'Jim Lee changed the face of fashion photography with his offbeat, unnerving vision.' 30 August 2015 written by Sarah Hughes.

Palm beach Daily News A one-page article by Jan Sjostrom that explores Jim's style of photography and work.

== Radio interviews ==
Radio Talk Europe

BBC 5 Live - LIFE IN B&W

Radio 4 Midweek Libby Purves

Radio Monacle 24

BBC Radio London Robert Elms
