= Elizabeth Arhin =

Ghanaian executive

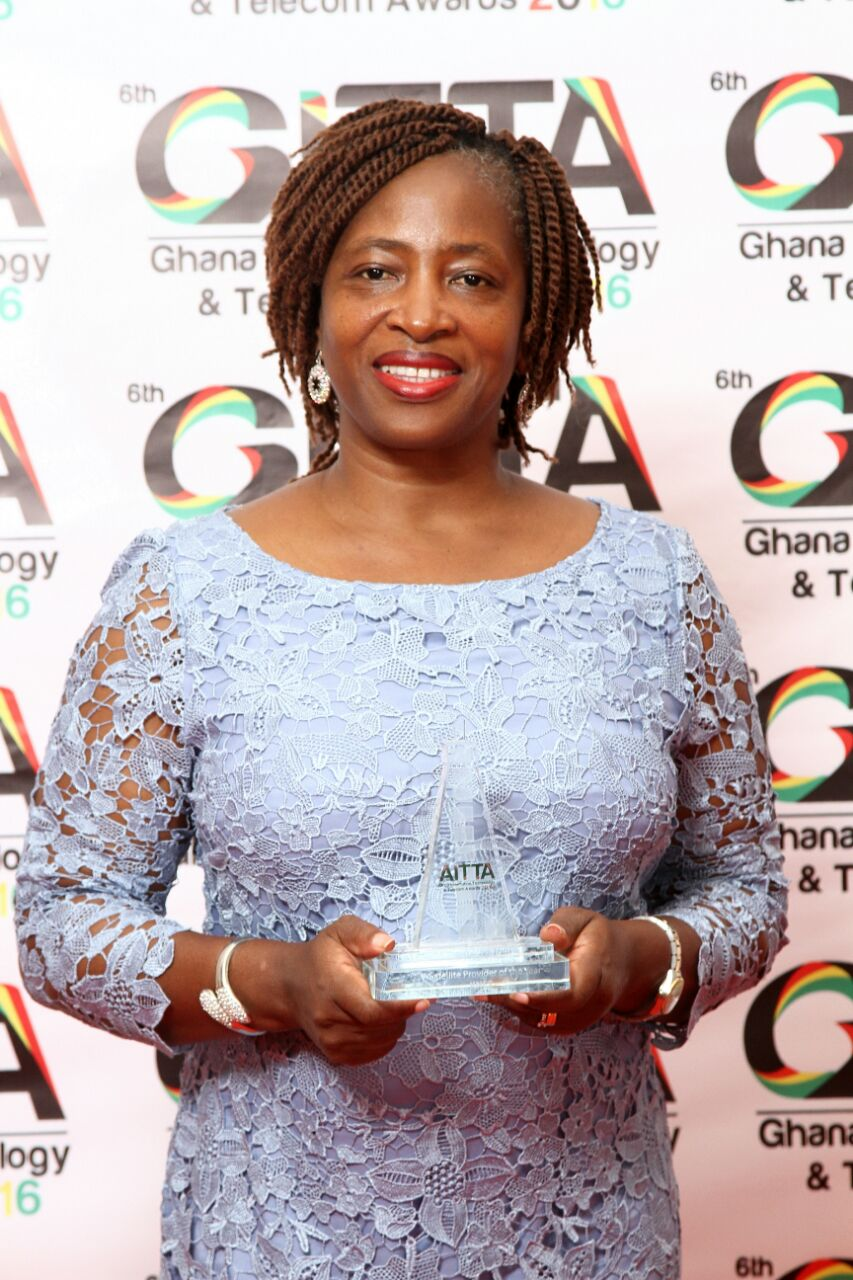
Elizabeth Frimpomah Arhin

Elizabeth Frimpomah Arhin worked as the Human Resource Director for Tigo, Ghana between July 2014 and July 2016.

== Education ==
Elizabeth has master's degrees in Manpower Studies from the University of Westminster in the United Kingdom and in Ministry from the Trinity Theological Seminary, Ghana.

== Career ==
Arhin was the Head of Personnel Section of Scancom Ghana limited from September 2003 to June 2005. She also held the Human Resource Development Manager position for British American Tobacco in Ghana for a year, from when she moved on to Guinness Ghana Breweries limited as the Talent and Organisation Effectiveness Manager. She took up the role of Human Resource Director for that same organisation a year later until May 2012 then she left to pursue a master's degree in Ministry at Trinity Theological Seminary. She held the position of Human Resource Director for G4S Security Services from 2012 to 2013 and became the Human Resource Director for Tigo, Ghana. Elizabeth has over 20 years' work experience from roles held in both the United Kingdom and Ghana.

== Personal life ==
Arhin is married with three children.
