= Steve Thomas (artist) =

English designer and visual artist

Steven Thomas (born Harry Steven Thomas, 30 October 1944) is an English designer and visual artist best known for his interiors and graphic design work for the Biba fashion brand.

With design partner Tim Whitmore, Thomas led the small team which generated numerous designs and branding for the company's ambitious seven-storey department store known as "Big Biba" in London's Kensington High Street in the early to mid-1970s.

In the 1960s, Thomas represented groups including Peter Frampton's group The Herd and went on to create designs for such music business clients as the Rolling Stones and Paul McCartney as well as brands such as Levi's, Lucky Strike, Subaru and British American Racing.

With Alwyn W. Turner, Thomas is the author of Welcome To Big Biba.

In 2008, Thomas was the subject of the exhibition Big Biba And Other Stories at London gallery Chelsea Space.

== Early life and education ==
Thomas was born in Chipping Norton. He attended Latymer Upper School in Hammersmith, west London, and studied painting at Chelsea School of Art, supplementing his grant with work as a male model and waiter at restaurants on the adjacent King's Road. He also helped realise the psychedelic design by art collective Binder Edwards & Vaughn for the façade of Chelsea boutique Dandie Fashions.

Among Thomas's art school teachers were the prominent British artists Patrick Caulfield, Allen Jones, and John Hoyland, from whom he developed a "love of Pop Art and my obsession with the complexities of colour".

== Design work for music ==
On graduation, Thomas formed a design practice with fellow student Whitmore. Among Whitmore-Thomas Design's early commissions was the back cover of the Rolling Stones' 1970 live album Get Yer Ya-Ya's Out!, which was completed within 48 hours to meet the record company Decca's deadline for the record release. Thomas later related that this was given Mick Jagger's seal of approval with the utterance "I really dig your work, man." Thomas also created record sleeves for Three Week Hero, an LP by PJ Proby, for Scorch by Judas Jump, for The Amazing Blondell and The Family Dogg for producer Steve Rowland and a rare cartoon cover for the obscure progressive rock outfit Rumpelstiltskin scripted by journalist/columnist Angus McGill and produced by Shel Talmy.

== Biba Cosmetics poster and Big Biba ==
In the late 60s, Thomas designed a poster to promote a new range of cosmetics from Biba, the boutique operated by Barbara Hulanicki and her husband Stephen "Fitz" Fitz-Simon, at that stage situated at 124-126 Kensington Church Street. The poster, featuring a wistful portrait of the veiled actress Ingrid Boulting taken by Sarah Moon won a 1970 British Design Council award.

Whitmore-Thomas restyled the children’s department within the Biba store and, with the launch of Biba Cosmetics, designed display units installed in concessions around the country.

In 1971, as Hulanicki and Fitz-Simon set about planning the expansion of their business into the large block previously operated as Derry & Tom's at 107-111 Kensington High Street, Whitmore-Thomas was commissioned to handle the designs for the entire store, including interiors, signage, giant display items and graphic designs for the hundreds of own-brand product lines. The distinctive department logos were designed by illustrator Kasia Charko. On opening in September 1973, Big Biba was described by The Sunday Times as "the most beautiful store in the world".

Big Biba closed in August 1975 after falling victim to a combination of over-ambition, in-fighting between the company's executives and the backers, property developer British Land and the UK's mid-70s economic recession.

== Paul McCartney ==
The work for Big Biba drew a fresh set of commissions for Whitmore-Thomas, including Paul McCartney, who appointed the practice as in-house designers for his domestic and business interests, including the headquarters of McCartney's company PML in central London's Soho Square (complete with a recreation of his favourite Abbey Road studio in the basement), as well as recording studios in Sussex and on the Mull of Kintyre and private residences in London, Liverpool, Sussex and Scotland.

== Whitmore-Thomas ==
As well as creating the livery for 25 buses on the Number 25 route, which passed Buckingham Palace in the Silver Jubilee year of 1977, the design practice serviced such clients as Danone, Guinness, Harrods, Lucky Strike, Pepsi Cola, Virgin, and Wrangler. The company became WTA when designer Chris Angell, who had worked with Thomas and Whitmore on Big Biba, became a director in 1993.

== V&A acquires Whitmore-Thomas archive ==
In June 2020, London's Victoria & Albert Museum acquired the entirety of the Whitmore-Thomas archive, with materials relating to 35 years of commissions.

This follows the V&A's 1995 acquisition of material relating to Whitmore-Thomas's design work for Biba, including interiors, graphics and packaging. Subsequently, the V&A took possession of WT's Biba photographic archive, which contains work-in-progress & record shots of the completed project taken by Tim White and Tim Street-Porter. The 2020 acquisition includes designs for Paul McCartney’s central London offices as well farms and recording studios, liveries for Formula One racing teams, the London Transport Silver Jubilee Buses, a model village for restaurateurs the Roux Brothers, projects for Levi-Strauss, Pepsi-Cola, the BBC, Lloyds Bank and restaurants such as the revolving CN Tower in Toronto and Mon Plaisir in central London.

== Later life ==
Following the dissolution of WTA, Thomas focused on painting as well as producing the book Welcome To Big Biba, which was published in 2006 and remains in print. Thomas's exhibition at Chelsea Space was held in 2008. Thomas, who has also staged one-man shows at the Chelsea Arts Club and Dorchester Collections, is based in Deal, Kent, where he continues to produce artworks and make prints.

On July 12, 2017, Thomas appeared in the BBC Radio 4 series Only Artists in conversation with fellow artist Jim Moir (better known as comedian Vic Reeves).
