= Barbara Hulanicki =

Fashion designer and founder of Biba clothes store

Barbara Hulanicki OBE
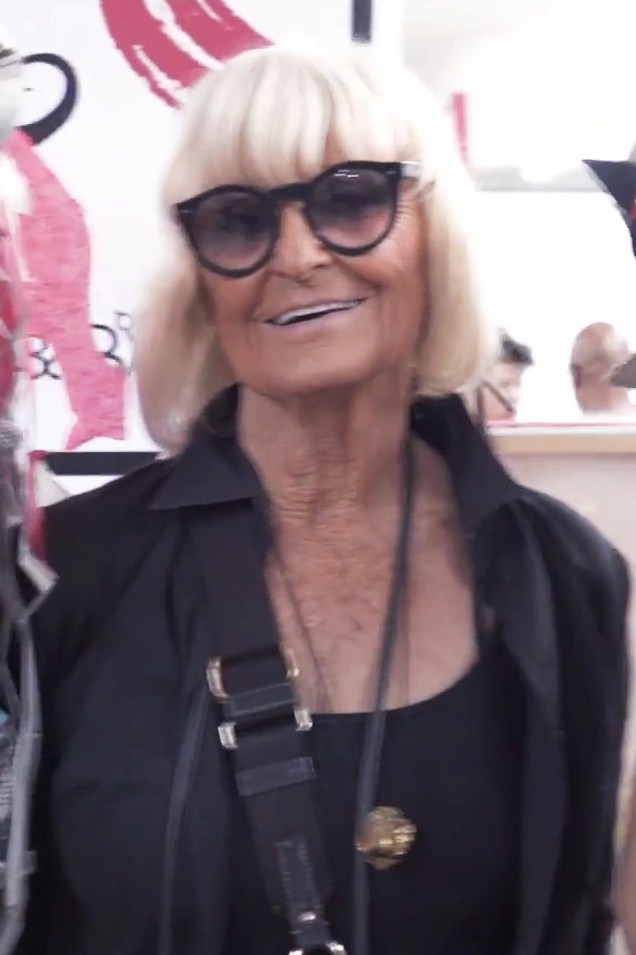
- Born: Warsaw, Poland
- Other name: Barbara Fitz-Simon
- Education: Brighton School of Art
- Occupation: Fashion designer
- Years active: Principally 1960s & 1970s
- Known for: Founder of Biba
- Spouse: Stephen Fitz-Simon

Barbara Hulanicki OBE (b. 1936) is a Polish - English fashion designer, born in Warsaw, Poland, to Polish parents and best known as the founder of clothes store Biba.

== Early life ==
Hulanicki was born in Warsaw, Poland, to Polish parents. Her father, Witold Hulanicki, was assassinated by the nationalist organisation Lehi in Jerusalem in 1948, and the family moved to Brighton, England.

== Career ==
While studying from 1954 to 1956 at the Brighton School of Art, Hulanicki won an Evening Standard competition in 1955 for beachwear. She began her career in fashion as a freelance fashion illustrator for various magazines, including Vogue, Tatler and Women's Wear Daily.

Hulanicki sold her first designs through a small mail-order business called Biba's Postal Boutique that was featured in the fashion columns of newspapers such as the London's Daily Mirror. She named the business Biba, after the nickname of her sister Biruta. In 1964, based on the success of her mail-order business, she opened her Biba shop in a street off Kensington High Street in London with the help of her husband, Stephen Fitz-Simon. The shop soon became known for its "stylishly decadent atmosphere" and decor inspired by Art Nouveau and Art Deco.

It became a hangout for artists, film stars and rock musicians, including Mick Jagger and The Rolling Stones, David Bowie, Marianne Faithfull and Cathy McGowan, presenter of British pop/rock TV programme Ready Steady Go!. In the shop, a young clientele bought affordable mini-skirts, floppy felt hats, feather boas, velvet trouser suits and unisex tee-shirts dyed in rich, muted colours. Anna Wintour started in fashion at age 15 as a Biba employee.

After the shop's 1975 closure, Hulanicki moved to Brazil, where she opened several other stores. She kept designing for labels such as Fiorucci and Cacharel and from 1980 to 1992 designed a line of children's wear, Minirock, licensed to the Japanese market. In 1981 she opened a new shop in UK.

In 1987, she moved to Miami, Florida, where she opened an interior design business, designing hotels for Chris Blackwell in Jamaica and the Bahamas. She has designed wallpaper for the Habitat store chain in Europe, launched a fashion and home range in India, and also produced a wallpaper range in her widely recognised Art Deco style for Graham & Brown.

British retailer Topshop opened a New York City store in April 2009, and later that month launched a collection featuring Hulanicki's designs. She produced a collection for Topshop featuring billowing chiffon dresses and blouses reminiscent of her original Biba style, along with several jersey pieces printed with her original illustrations, bikinis and a cropped suede jacket. In the same month, a handbag in her Art Deco style was made by the Italian label Coccinelle. About the design scene in 2009, Hulanicki has said: "There is very little difference today as opposed to the '70s; although, there is much more choice now. Both periods share the same enthusiasm, if you press the right buttons."

In December 2013, she was the guest on BBC Radio 4's Desert Island Discs, where her top choice was "The Girl from Ipanema" by Stan Getz and Joao Gilberto, with vocal by Astrud Gilberto. In September 2015, Hulanicki was interviewed on the BBC TV's HARDtalk. She has said: "Now whenever I finish something I take some photographs and say 'goodbye'. When you lose everything, you realise that the only thing you have is what's in your head."

In 2009, the British department store group House of Fraser bought the rights to the Biba label. In 2014, Hulanicki agreed to serve as a consultant for Biba, the first time since 1975 that she had been involved with the brand she created.

In 2021, Hulanicki started a new venture with virtual reality company, BrandLab360, to create a new label titled 'Hula'. The new brand will be sold exclusively to trade buyers on BrandLab 360's digital showroom and was created after Hulanicki met with Dan OConnell and Jennifer Drury, the platform's founders, in Miami, where she is now based.

== Awards ==
Hulanicki received an Honorary Doctorate from Heriot-Watt University in 2010.

Hulanicki was appointed Officer of the Order of the British Empire (OBE) in the 2012 New Year Honours for services to the fashion industry.
