= Prudence Millinery =

British fashion designer

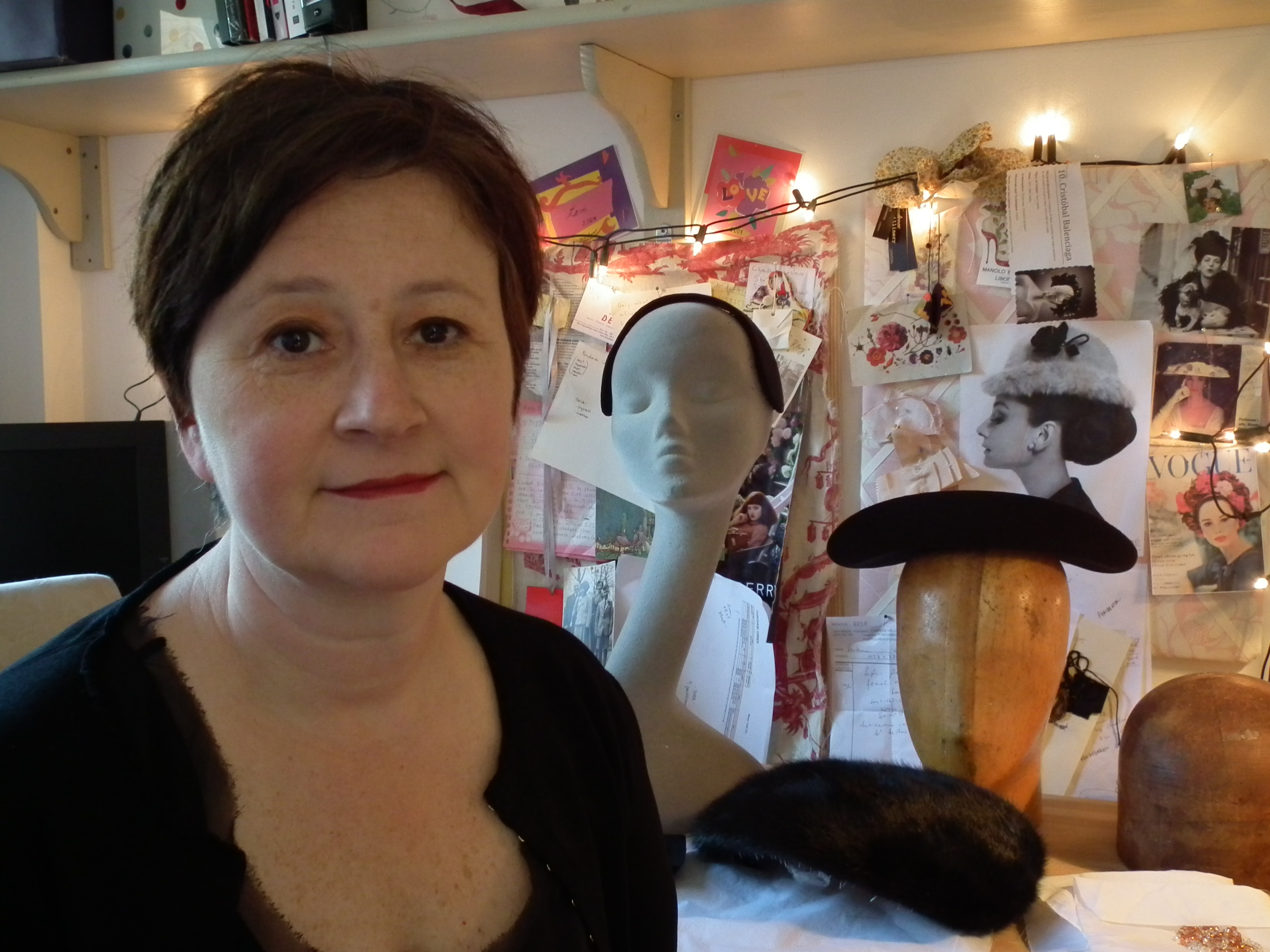
Image of Prudence

Prudence Millinery designs and makes couture hats for major designers all over the world.

== A brief history ==
Prudence was born in New-York, USA. A graduate of New York's Fashion Institute of Technology and a former assistant buyer for the Associated Merchandising Corporation, she left New York and moved to London in 1986. After working as a free-lance fashion stylist, she trained for several years in couture millinery. Her hats are made in the classical manner using only traditional millinery techniques. Prudence designed her first collection for spring 1991 under her own label, Prudence Millinery, and received orders from Bergdorf Goodman and Henri Bendel both in New York City. Her collaboration with Vivienne Westwood started in 1990 and she still creates today hat collections for Vivienne Westwood and has created designs for many other top fashion designers such as Yves Saint Laurent, Gucci, Julien MacDonald, Biba and many others. Prudence currently designs and makes the hats for the Couture Collections for James Lock & Co., the world's oldest hat shop located in Mayfair, London.

== Prudence and Vivienne Westwood ==
In November 1990, she was asked by London designer Vivienne Westwood to create the hats for her autumn / winter 1991 collection and has been working with Vivienne ever since. She now also designs and produces couture hats for men following the success of the Vivienne Westwood MAN collections. She now creates the hats for Westwood's new label, Andreas Kronthaler for Vivienne Westwood. Her intensive work for Vivienne Westwood can be viewed on the website: http://viviennewestwood.prudencemillinery.com/.

== Yves Saint Laurent, Tom Ford, Biba, Julien MacDonald, Balenciaga, Lacoste… ==
Prudence designed models for Balenciaga in Paris and worked with Tom Ford at Yves Saint Laurent and Gucci. She designed and produced all the pret-a-porter hats for YSL Rive Gauche in Paris for men and women. She has also designed hats for Sir Hardy Amies, London, and for such people as Jerry Hall, Raquel Welch, Diana, Princess of Wales, Joan Collins, Hugh Grant, Lady Snowden, Linda Evangelista, Dior model Bettina, best-selling American author Nancy Friday, Duran Duran's Simon Le Bon and The Sex Pistols.

Prudence has created two collections for Balfour Hats and designed an exclusive collection for the store Le Bon Marché in Paris. In 1993 she began designing ladies' hats for Bond Street hatter Herbert Johnson and in that same year designed a spring collection for Joseph in Knightsbridge. She has worked with French sportswear label Lacoste designing and producing women's caps and bands for the spring / summer 2006 collections in New York. Prudence has been designing and making hats for French designer Charles Anastase's since autumn / winter 2007. Since spring / summer 2008, she has been designing and creating hats for Hector Castro at Biba and for Julien MacDonald She also has made hats for Swiss born designers, English designer Isa Arfen and for the London store Liberty of London.

Since March 2016, Prudence also creates Couture Hats for James Lock & Co.

== Japan ==
Prudence designs knit hats collections with Yoshikawa – boushi Inc. in Japan, which are sold throughout Japan at select United Arrows branches. She has been designing collections of hats for Weave Toshi sold exclusively at CA4LA and Test shops throughout Japan since autumn / winter 2006. She has worked in collaboration with Hankyu Department Store company in Japan, designing and creating an exclusive collection of hats for the Japanese market.

== Passing on the knowledge ==
Prudence has also taught couture millinery in conjunction with the Vivienne Westwood course at the Hochschule der Künste in Berlin and at Colorado State University, the Paris American Academy in Paris, the American Intercontinental University in London and at Mode Gakuen in Tokyo, Osaka and Nagoya. Prudence currently holds hat classes and workshops in London.

== Lavazza 2008 Calendar ==
Prudence also worked on the 2008 advertising campaign for Lavazza coffee. Her hats were featured in the ads for October and March in Lavazza 2008 calendar.

== Awards ==
In 1996, Prudence won the Best Accessories Award for the MAN couture hats by the Fashion Council of America.

== Press and publications ==
In May 1991, Prudence had her first international cover for Italian Vogue with a hat from her spring collection photographed by Steven Meisel gracing the head of supermodel Linda Evangelista. After that followed many other photographs and articles for various magazines and newspapers such as L'Uomo Vogue, British Vogue, Vogue Italia, Vanity Fair, Elle, W and Harpers & Queen. Her work is pictured in many books, such as Vivienne Westwood: 34 Years in Fashion, Vivienne Westwood: An Unfashionable Life, Hats. Status, Style and Glamour Anna Piaggi photographed her hats for her fashion book Fashion Algebra. In January 2009, a book was published by the V&A, Hats : an anthology featuring some of her hats.

== Exhibitions ==
Hats : Hats, An Anthology by Stephen Jones at the V&A Museum, ( Victoria & Albert Museum, Porter Gallery ) - 24 February to 10 May 2009
Vivienne Westwood : 34 years in Fashion, at the V&A Museum, ( Victoria & Albert Museum ) - This exhibition travelled the world, and went to China & Japan, Tokyo, USA.

== In the movies ==
Prudence Millinery has created for Vivienne Westwood the hats featuring in the first movie Sex and the City and the sequel Sex and the City 2. They created hats for Harry Potter and the Goblet of Fire.
