= Shelby Bryan =

Ex-husband of Anna Wintour (born 1946)

John Shelby Bryan (born March 21, 1946) is an American telecommunications pioneer, business executive, and venture capitalist. He is best known for being the ex-husband of Vogue editor-in-chief Anna Wintour.

== Early life ==
Bryan was born in Houston, Texas, on March 21, 1946. He attended Mirabeau B. Lamar High School in Houston where he excelled in football and boxing. Bryan received from the University of Texas at Austin a B.A. in 1968 and a J.D. degree, graduating Phi Delta Phi in 1970. He was one of two law graduates in the United States chosen to work in Washington, DC for Ralph Nader, focusing on the passage of the Clean Water Act. In 1973, Bryan received an MBA from Harvard Business School.

== Career ==
In 1973, Bryan joined Morgan Stanley in the mergers and acquisitions department. He left in 1977 and moved to Houston to form an oil and gas company, Austin Resources Corporation, and a bank holding company, with Ned Holmes, which became Prosperity Bank, one of the largest Texas-based banks.

In 1980, Bryan moved back to New York to partner with Jan Stenbeck and set up a company, Millicom, to operate voice and data distribution which became cellular telephony. Bryan served as president of Millicom from 1981 to 1994. Millicom received one of the first three US cellular developmental licenses in 1981. In addition to operations in the United States, Millicom went on to form cellular joint ventures in over 20 countries throughout the world including Mexico, Hong Kong, the Soviet Union, the Philippines and Pakistan. One of the companies, Vodafone, was formed in partnership with the British company, Racal Electronics.

In 1981, Millicom formed a company, Microtel Communications, in partnership with British Aerospace and Pacific Telesis which was awarded by the British government a personal communications network “PCN” which competed with Vodafone. The service branded as Orange was later acquired by France Telecom which subsequently changed its name to Orange.

In 1994, Bryan was asked to step in to replace the CEO of ICG Communications, which was in the midst of financial failure. Brought in by ICG's board of directors as a change agent, Bryan turned the failing company around by immediately replacing the management team with more experienced, higher caliber professionals and implementing a new business plan. He successfully raised more than $2 billion in financing, and from 1996 to 1999 revenues were raised 10 times from approximately $50 million to $500 million. By the end of 1999 ICG was carrying approximately 15% of the world's internet traffic. That historical improvement in revenues enabled the company to grow from 125 to more than 3,500 employees. At the time, ICG was one of the first telecom companies aggressively deploying fiber in metropolitan areas.

Bryan saw the warning signs of the looming dot-com bust: an overbuilt, unpredictable industry that was over-funded. When he shared his concerns with the company's stakeholders, his prediction was very unpopular. Bryan stepped down from his role at ICG in 2000 when the company, like most of those in the Internet business, began to face difficult times during the dot-com meltdown.

Following his departure from ICG, Bryan went on to form Pingtone Communications, one of the first VOIP (Voice over IP) companies in the United States. BusinessWeek currently lists Bryan as chairman and chief executive officer of the Washington, D.C.–based company.

== Politics ==
A supporter of the Democratic Party, Bryan served as the National Finance Chair of the Democratic Senatorial Campaign Committee from 1988 to 1989. He served on the President's Foreign Intelligence Advisory Board from 1999 to 2001.

== Personal life ==
Bryan started boxing when he was 14 years old, and at age 16 competed in a Golden Gloves competition.

Bryan and his first wife, Lucia, have two daughters. After divorcing Lucia, Bryan married his second wife Katherine, and had two sons. Three of his four children live in New York, and one lives in Beverly Hills.

Bryan gained media attention in 1999 when he started an affair with renowned Vogue editor-in-chief Anna Wintour. The two met at a Benefit Ball for the New York Ballet. Both Bryan and Wintour ended their marriages and lived together in New York's Greenwich Village. Bryan continues to maintain a residence in Houston. While he did accompany Wintour to high-profile fashion, cultural and fundraising events, Bryan intentionally flew "under the radar." The couple also enjoyed traveling and attending U.S. Open tennis matches. They split in 2020.
