= Jennifer Hocking =

British-based fashion model, fashion editor, and fashion designer

- Born: 4 October 1929; Sydney, Australia
- Died: 27 May 2011 (aged 81); UK
- Occupations: Model, magazine editor, fashion designer
- Spouse: Nigel Howland (divorced)

Jennifer Hocking (4 October 1929 – 27 May 2011) was an Australian-born British-based fashion model in the 1950s and early 1960s, who then became fashion editor of Harper's Bazaar and Queen. Whilst there, she gave Anna Wintour her first magazine job. Hocking then pursued fashion design, before rediscovering success as a mature model in the 1990s, when she was described as a "grande dame" after her appearance in Mario Testino's shoots for Burberry.

== Early life ==
Hocking was born in Sydney, where she went to art school. In 1952 she borrowed the fare from her brother and sailed to the United Kingdom to pursue a career as a fashion model. Whilst there, she married a male model and actor called Nigel Howland. The marriage eventually ended in divorce.

== Career ==
=== Modelling, part 1 ===
Hocking began her career as a model by doing fashion shows, but eventually became a leading photographic model, basing her style on that of a leading American model, Anne St. Marie. In 1956 Hocking was named London Model of the Year by The Daily Express. Although she could present as aloof and sophisticated, she also had an approachable quality, which enabled her modelling career to be most successful during the transitional period between the 1950s and the mid-1960s, as she resembled a young career woman rather than one of the haughty ladies favoured for 1950s fashion photography.

Along with Paulene Stone, she became a favoured model of Terence Donovan and David Montgomery. Brian Duffy photographed her with the author Frank Norman. However, Hocking became aware that her maturity was working against her, as teenage models began to be more popular, and she ceased modelling.

=== Journalism ===
Hocking's first job after quitting modelling was as a stylist for Fashion, before being transferred to Harper's Bazaar and succeeding Molly Parkin as fashion editor. She stayed on in 1970 when Harper's Bazaar merged with Queen to become Harper's & Queen.

Whilst at Harper's & Queen, Hocking was challenged by the small budgets and tiny fashion department, but hired a young 21-year old Anna Wintour as her editorial assistant as she was impressed by Wintour's precocious professionalism. In 1974, Hocking was asked by the Fashion Museum, Bath to choose that year's defining looks for their Dress of the Year collection, for which she selected male and female knitted ensembles by Missoni. A couple of years later, Hocking helped style Joanna Lumley for some episodes of The New Avengers.

Following the decision of Harpers & Queen to try and challenge British Vogue's place at the top of the British fashion magazine hierarchy, Hocking decided to leave, and was succeeded by Min Hogg despite Wintour trying for the job.

=== Fashion design ===
After leaving Harper's & Queen, Hocking became a fashion designer for Christopher Carr Jones's mail-order company, and then started up her own equivalent business.

=== Modelling, part 2 ===
In the 1990s, Hocking resumed modelling as a professional mature model, and came to the attention of Mario Testino, who had been seeking out other models that had retired in the mid-1960s in order to develop the narrative of his photographs for Burberry. Along with Tania Mallet, Hocking became one of Testino's favourite models as a representation of the "early-60s Englishness" that enhanced the Burberry brand. In 2002, The New York Times described Hocking and Mallet as "grande dames" who looked as good in Burberry fashion as their co-star, the young and glamorous Elizabeth Jagger.

== Later life and death ==
Hocking died in 2011 of cancer at the age of 81. She was survived by her daughter Wendy, also a model, and her son Julian.
