= Viva (American magazine) =

Defunct adult women's magazine

Viva was an adult women's magazine that premiered in 1973 and ceased publication in 1980. Its full title was Viva, The International Magazine For Women, and it was published by Bob Guccione and his wife, Kathy Keeton. The first issue of Viva is dated October 1973. Guccione, who was the editor of Penthouse, an adult men's magazine, wanted to publish a companion title for women. Viva was essentially an erotic magazine for women, containing articles and fiction delving into women’s fantasies and exploring their sexuality, as well as reviews of the arts, interviews with well-known personalities, and fashion and beauty. It was published on a monthly basis.

Anna Wintour's first position as a fashion editor was at Viva in 1976.

== Works cited ==
- Oppenheimer, Jerry (2005). Front Row: The Cool Life and Hot Times of Vogue's Editor In Chief. St. Martin's Press, New York. ISBN 0-312-32310-7.
