= Get Yer Ya-Ya's Out! =

Live album by the Rolling Stones
- Released: 4 September 1970
- Recorded: 26 November 1969, Baltimore Civic Center; 27–28 November 1969, Madison Square Garden; January–February 1970, Olympic Studios (vocal overdubs)
- Genres: Hard rock; blues rock
- Length: 47:36
- Labels: Decca (UK); London (US)
- Producers: The Rolling Stones; Glyn Johns

The Rolling Stones chronology
Let It Bleed (1969)	Get Yer Ya-Ya's Out! (1970)	Sticky Fingers (1971)

Get Yer Ya-Ya's Out!: The Rolling Stones in Concert is the second live album by the Rolling Stones, released on 4 September 1970 on Decca Records in the UK and on London Records in the United States. It was recorded in New York City and Baltimore in November 1969 prior to the release of Let It Bleed. It is the first live album to reach number 1 in the UK. It was reported to have been issued in response to the well-known bootleg Live'r Than You'll Ever Be. This was also the band's final release under the Decca record label. Subsequent releases were made under the band's own label Rolling Stones Records.

== History ==
The Rolling Stones 1969 American Tour's trek during November into December, with Terry Reid, B.B. King (replaced on some dates by Chuck Berry) and Ike and Tina Turner as supporting acts, played to venues with all tickets sold out. The tour was the first for guitarist Mick Taylor with the Stones, having replaced Brian Jones shortly before Jones's death in July; this was also the first album where Taylor appeared fully and prominently, having only played on two songs on Let It Bleed. The performances captured for this release were recorded on 27 November 1969 (one show) and 28 November 1969 (two shows) at New York City's Madison Square Garden, except for "Love in Vain," recorded in Baltimore on 26 November 1969. Overdub sessions took place in January 1970 in London's Olympic Studios. The finished product featured overdubbed lead vocals on all tracks except "Love In Vain", "Midnight Rambler" and "Sympathy for the Devil", added back-up vocals on three tracks, and overdubbed guitar on "Little Queenie", where Mick Taylor's rhythm guitar was replaced by Keith Richards. However, this album is widely recognized as one of few actual 'live' albums during this era.

The album's title is taken from "Get Your Yas Yas Out," a song recorded by Blind Boy Fuller in 1938. In the context of the Blind Boy Fuller song, the meaning of Ya-Ya's is interpreted to mean ‘to blow off steam’, ‘get the energy out’, to 'jump and dance' and for having sex, where Ya Ya's are women's breasts. This is the interpretation as shown on the cover of the album, with Charlie Watts jumping around with a guitar and bass in his hands, an 'ass' to the left of him, and himself wearing a T-shirt with a picture of women's breasts. The photo by David Bailey was further inspired by a line in Bob Dylan's song "Visions of Johanna": "Jewels and binoculars hang from the head of the mule" (though, as mentioned, the animal in the photo is a donkey, not a mule). The band would later say "we originally wanted an elephant but settled for a donkey".

Some of the performances, as well as one of the two photography sessions for the album cover featuring Charlie Watts and a donkey, are depicted in the documentary film Gimme Shelter, and shows Watts and Mick Jagger in early February 1970 on a section of the M6 motorway adjacent to Bescot Rail Depot in Walsall, England, posing with a donkey. This is adjacent to where the RAC building now stands. The cover photo, however, was taken on June 7, 1970, in London, and does not originate from the February 1970 session.

Jagger commissioned the back cover, featuring song titles and credits with photographs of the group two performances at the Saville Theatre, London, UK, December 14, 1969, from British artist Steve Thomas, who said he produced the design in 48 hours and that Jagger's response was "I really dig your artwork, man.".

== Release and reception ==
Professional ratings
Aggregate scores
Source	Rating
Metacritic	81/100 (deluxe edition)
Review scores
Source	Rating
AllMusic	4.5/5 stars
Christgau's Record Guide	B
Entertainment Weekly	B
MusicHound Rock	2/5
NME	7/10
Pitchfork	5.4/10
Q	4/5 stars
The Rolling Stone Album Guide	4/5 stars
Uncut	4/5 stars
Record Collector	5/5 stars

In the Rolling Stone review of the album, critic Lester Bangs said, "I have no doubt that it's the best rock concert ever put on record."

Get Yer Ya-Ya's Out! was released in September 1970, well into sessions for the band's next studio album, Sticky Fingers, and was well-received critically and commercially, reaching number 1 in the UK and number 6 in the United States, where it went platinum. Except for compilations, it was the last Rolling Stones album released through Decca Records in the UK and London Records in the United States before the band launched its own Rolling Stones Records label.

In August 2002, Get Yer Ya-Ya's Out! was reissued in a new remastered album and SACD digipak by ABKCO Records.

In November 2009, the album was reissued with unreleased songs by the Rolling Stones and also by opening acts B.B. King and Ike & Tina Turner. It includes a DVD and a 56-page booklet.

In 2000, it was voted number 816 in Colin Larkin's All Time Top 1000 Albums. In 2015, it was included at number 17 on their list of the best live albums of all time. In a 2024 list, Ultimate Classic Rock ranked it the best Rolling Stones live album.

== Track listing ==
=== Original release ===
All tracks are written by Mick Jagger and Keith Richards, except where noted.

Side one
No.	Title	Writer(s)	Length
1.	"Jumpin' Jack Flash" (27 November 1969: Madison Square Garden, New York City)		4:02
2.	"Carol" (28 November 1969: MSG – first show)	Chuck Berry	3:47
3.	"Stray Cat Blues" (28 November 1969: MSG – first show)		3:41
4.	"Love in Vain" (26 November 1969: Civic Center, Baltimore)	Robert Johnson†	4:57
5.	"Midnight Rambler" (28 November 1969: MSG – second show)		9:05

Side two
No.	Title	Writer(s)	Length
1.	"Sympathy for the Devil" (28 November 1969: MSG – first show)		6:52
2.	"Live with Me" (28 November 1969: MSG – second show)		3:03
3.	"Little Queenie" (28 November 1969: MSG – first show)	Chuck Berry	4:33
4.	"Honky Tonk Women" (27 November 1969: MSG and 28 November 1969: MSG – second show)		3:35
5.	"Street Fighting Man" (28 November 1969: MSG – first show)		4:03

† Originally credited as traditional with arrangement by Jagger, Richards. On Let It Bleed, "Love in Vain" was credited to Woody Payne, presumably a music publisher's creation.

=== 40th anniversary deluxe box set ===
==== Disc one – original release ====
1. "Jumpin' Jack Flash" – 4:03
2. "Carol" – 3:46
3. "Stray Cat Blues" – 3:47
4. "Love in Vain" – 4:56
5. "Midnight Rambler" – 9:04
6. "Sympathy for the Devil" – 6:51
7. "Live With Me" – 3:02
8. "Little Queenie" – 4:33
9. "Honky Tonk Women" – 3:34
10. "Street Fighting Man" – 4:04

==== Disc two – unreleased tracks ====
1. "Prodigal Son" (Robert Wilkins) – 4:04
2. "You Gotta Move" (Fred McDowell, Rev. Gary Davis) – 2:18
3. "Under My Thumb" – 3:38
4. "I'm Free" – 2:47
5. "(I Can't Get No) Satisfaction" – 5:38

*Released in 2009

==== Disc three – opening sets ====
1. "Everyday I Have the Blues" – 2:27
2. "How Blue Can You Get" – 5:30
3. "That's Wrong, Little Mama" – 4:11
4. "Why I Sing The Blues" – 5:16
5. "Please Accept My Love" – 4:52
6. "Gimme Some Lovin'" – 0:49
7. "Sweet Soul Music" – 1:16
8. "Son of a Preacher Man" – 2:49
9. "Proud Mary" – 3:07
10. "I've Been Loving You Too Long" – 5:40
11. "Come Together" – 3:36
12. "Land of a Thousand Dances" – 2:40

*B.B. King (Tracks 1–5); Ike & Tina Turner (Tracks 6–12)

==== Disc four – bonus DVD (2.0 and 5.1) ====
1. Introduction (Madison Square Garden)
2. "Prodigal Son" – 2:40
3. "You Gotta Move" – 1:58
4. Photo shoot (of album cover) – 3:30
5. Keith in studio – 1:40
6. "Under My Thumb" / "I'm Free" / Backstage with Jimi Hendrix – 6:09
7. "(I Can't Get No) Satisfaction" / Outside waiting for transport – 10:45
8. Credits

*Backstage footage shot by Albert and David Maysles with in-studio footage from album cover shoot

== Bonus track recording dates ==
Audio

1. "Prodigal Son" – 4:04 (28 November 1969: Madison Square Garden, New York City (second show)
2. "You Gotta Move" – 2:18 (28 November 1969: MSG – second show)
3. "Under My Thumb" – 3:38 (27 November 1969: MSG)
4. "I'm Free" – 2:47 (27 November 1969: MSG)
5. "(I Can't Get No) Satisfaction" – 5:38 (28 November 1969: MSG – first show)

Video

1. "Prodigal Son" – 2:40 (27 November 1969: MSG)
2. "You Gotta Move" – 1:50 (27 November 1969: MSG)
3. "Under My Thumb" – 3:30 (28 November 1969: MSG – first show)
4. "I'm Free" – 1:30 (28 November 1969: MSG – first show)
5. "(I Can't Get No) Satisfaction" – 6:00 (27 November 1969: MSG)

== Personnel ==
- Mick Jagger – vocals; harmonica on "Midnight Rambler"
- Keith Richards – guitar, backing vocals
- Mick Taylor – guitar
- Bill Wyman – bass guitar
- Charlie Watts – drums

Additional musicians

- Ian Stewart – piano on "Carol", "Little Queenie" and "Honky Tonk Women"

=== Production ===
- Recording and mixing engineer – Glyn Johns
- Mixing and editing – Andy Johns and Roy Thomas Baker
- Tape operator – Chris Kimsey
- Photography – David Bailey
- Art director – John Kosh
- Recording by Wally Heider Mobile

== Charts ==
Chart performance for Get Yer Ya-Ya's Out!
Chart (1970)	Peak position
Australian Albums (Kent Music Report)	2
Canada Top Albums/CDs (RPM)	3
Dutch Albums (Album Top 100)	2
Finnish Albums (The Official Finnish Charts)	4
German Albums (Offizielle Top 100)	5
Italian Albums (Musica e Dischi)	6
Japanese Albums (Oricon)	30
Norwegian Albums (VG-lista)	3
Sweden (Kvällstoppen)	7
UK Albums (Official Charts)	1
US Billboard 200	6

== Certifications ==
Certifications for Get Yer Ya-Ya's Out!
Region	Certification	Certified units/sales
Canada (Music Canada)	Gold	50,000^{^}
United Kingdom (BPI) 2006 release	Silver	60,000^{‡}
United States (RIAA)	Platinum	1,000,000^{^}
^{^} Shipments figures based on certification alone.^{‡} Sales+streaming figures based on certification alone.
