= Min Hogg =

British journalist, magazine editor, and interior designer (1938–2019)

Georgina Hogg MBE (28 September 1938 – 25 June 2019), known as Min Hogg, was a British journalist, magazine editor, and interior designer. She was the daughter of Sir James Cecil Hogg K.C.V.O., an ear specialist whose patients included Queen Elizabeth II. She was the fashion editor of Harper's & Queen between 1974 and 1979, and then co-founded the World of Interiors in 1981, which became one of the most influential shelter magazines of the late 20th century. She died in June 2019.

== Early life ==
Georgina Hogg was born in London in 1938, and grew up in Regent's Park. Her father was a personal physician to the Queen, with a surgery on Harley Street. She was a boarder at Benenden School and then went on to the Central School of Art and Design to study graphic design with Terence Conran. Hogg was one of the girlfriends of John Huston, with his daughter Anjelica recalling how Hogg lent her her high-heeled shoes to help her practise her modelling walk.

== Career ==
Conran's wife, Caroline, who was already working at Queen, asked Hogg to come and join the magazine as a typist. This was her first job, introducing Hogg to journalism as a career. Hogg briefly left to write for The Observer on interior decor and architecture, and was also a photographer's agent for a while, but in 1974, returned to the team of Queen (now rechristened Harpers & Queen) as a fashion editor. Hogg eventually succeeded Jennifer Hocking as chief fashion editor, much to the frustration of Hocking's assistant, Anna Wintour, who had wanted the role. However, Willie Landels, the editor of Harper & Queen, stated that he employed Hogg because she was intelligent and articulate, and unusually for a fashion editor at the time, was able to both speak and write well. Hogg stayed on at Harper & Queen until 1979. She then went on to become fashion editor for Sheba, an Arabic-language magazine aimed towards the wives of Middle Eastern oil barons.

Hogg was the founding editor of World of Interiors, and held the role for 20 years from 1981 to 2001. The magazine, originally titled Interiors, proved so successful that within six months of its launch in November 1981, Condé Nast made an offer to purchase it. In June 1982, Condé Nast eventually purchased a half-interest, and the magazine was renamed World of Interiors to avoid conflict with another American magazine also called Interiors. Whilst Condé Nast already owned a similarly conceived publication, House & Garden, the company felt that World of Interiors offered an exclusive up-market image to appeal to those seeking escapism and fantasy, whilst House & Garden was more accessible and that the titles would be complementary, rather than rivals. By December 1983, World of Interiors had a circulation of 52,000 issues per month, with 7,000 per month in the United States and many notable subscribers, including Jacqueline Onassis, Paloma Picasso, and Bill Blass. In 1983 alone, advertising revenues had risen by 68 percent from 1982.

Under Hogg's direction, the magazine promoted interiors that used historical textiles and artefacts to create a romantic and rarefied effect, although she stated that she was simply doing whatever pleased her. In 1983 she described her approach as celebrating homes personalised by their residents, rather than interiors created by professional decorators, and stated that she wanted to promote eclecticism, vintage style, and individualism, not modernism or minimalism. In June 1999, the New Statesman commented that Hogg's 18 years in the post made her a typical example of the longevity of Condé Nast's editors.

== Later life ==
Until her death in 2019, at the age of 80, Hogg continued travelling in pursuit of inspiration, with homes in London and the Canary Islands. As of 2017, she worked as a wallpaper designer in collaboration with Nicholas Haslam.
