= Vogue World 2024 =

Event celebrating 100 years of French fashion

- Date: 23 June 2024
- Time: 9:00 pm (CET)
- Duration: 40 Minutes
- Venue: Place Vendôme
- Location: Center of Place Vendôme
- Theme: French fashion and sport from the 1920s-2010s, & Olympics
- Organized by: Vogue, Anna Wintour
- Participants: 500
- Outcome: 800

Vogue World 2024 took place in Paris, France at Place Vendôme in June of 2024. The event was conceptualized by Vogue's then editor-in-chief, Anna Wintour. Each decade from the 1920s to the 2010s was paired with a sport, such as fencing, aquatics, or cycling, to highlight the relationship between fashion and athleticism ahead of the 2024 Summer Olympics in Paris.

== Background ==
=== Previous events ===
Vogue World is a fashion and cultural event created by Vogue magazine. The first Vogue World was held in New York City in 2022 to celebrate the 130 year anniversary of the magazine. The event turned the Meatpacking District into a street fair and outdoor venue for a runway and fashion show. The event included performances by Lil Nas X and runway appearances by figures such as Serena Williams, aiming to combine fashion with local culture and highlight Vogue's September issue.

In 2023, the event was held in London, with a focus on fundraising for the performing arts sector in the United Kingdom. The Vogue World event in London featured a runway show, performances, and appearances from notable British members of the fashion and arts industries. Anna Wintour, Vogue's then editor-in-chief, played a key role in organizing the Vogue World events.

== Runway show ==
The runway show for Vogue World 2024 was held in Paris at the Place Vendôme, the first fashion show ever held at the site. Figures like Sabrina Carpenter, Katy Perry, Eva Longoria, Diane Kruger, and French influencer Léna Mahfouf attended in the front row.

The musical performances at Vogue World Paris 2024 featured a range of international artists such as Aya Nakamura and Bad Bunny. The event also included a 40-piece orchestra.

Vogue World pledged a portion of proceeds from ticket sales from the show to Secours Populaire, which encourages access to sports for children in France.

== See also ==
- Vogue
- Met Gala
- Sleeping Beauties: Reawakening Fashion
