= Millicom =

Latin American telecommunications company

Millicom International Cellular S.A.
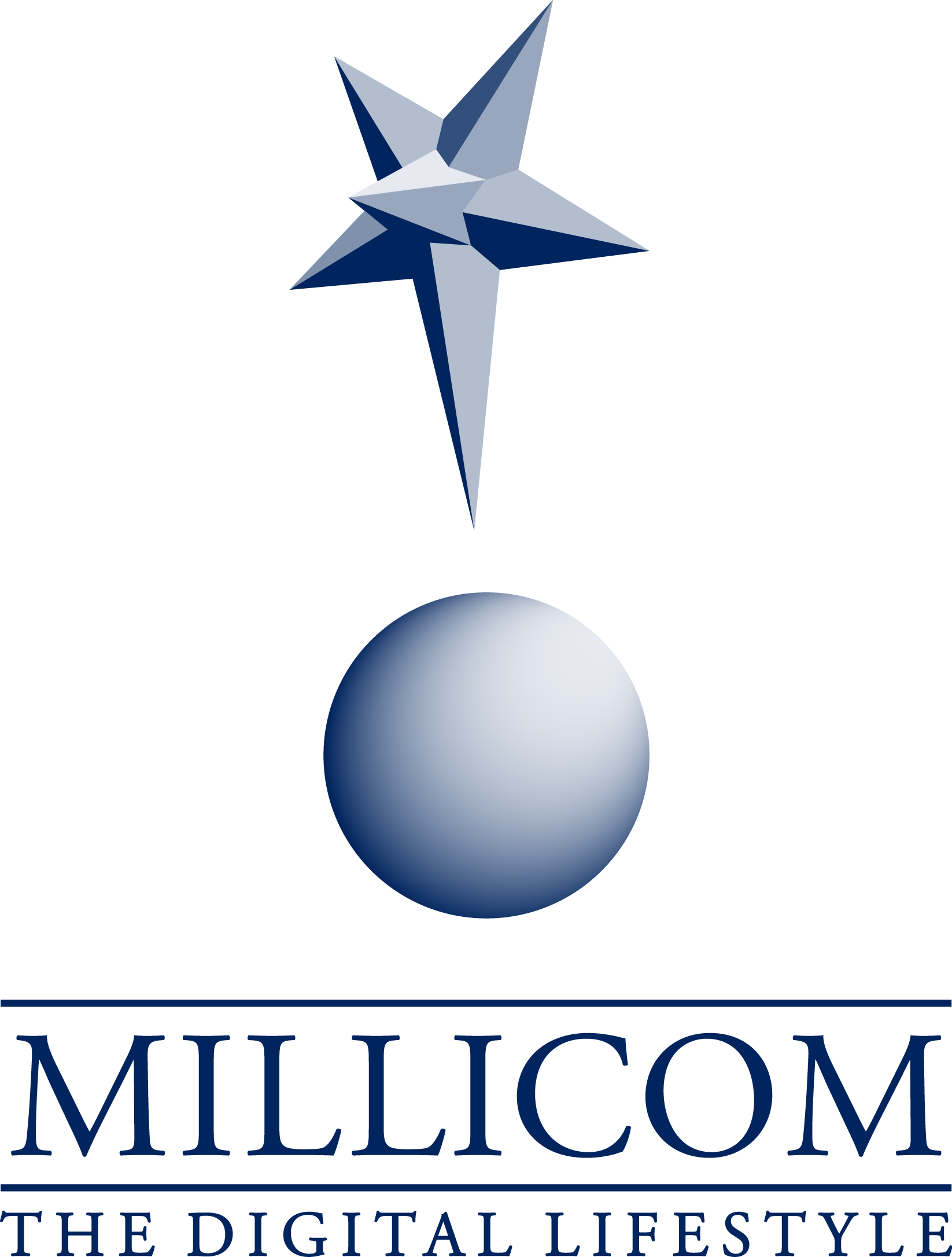
- Type: Public
- Traded as: Nasdaq: TIGO
- ISIN: LU0038705702
- Industry: Telecommunications, Media
- Founded: 14 December 1990; 35 years ago
- Founders: Jan Stenbeck, Shelby Bryan
- Headquarters: Luxembourg City, Luxembourg (registered office); Doral, Florida, United States (principal executive offices)
- Area served: Latin America
- Key people: Maxime Lombardini (Chairman); Marcelo Benítez (CEO); Bart Vanhaeren (CFO)
- Products: Mobile telephony, fixed broadband (cable and fibre), pay TV, mobile financial services, B2B services
- Brands: Tigo, Tigo Business, Tigo Money, Tigo Sports, Tigo ONEtv
- Revenue: ▲US$5.82 billion (2025)
- Net income: ▲US$1.32 billion (2025)
- Owner: Atlas Investissement (Xavier Niel) (46.7%, June 2026)
- Number of employees: More than 20,000 (June 2026, including the Honduras joint venture and Chile associate)
- Website: www.millicom.com

Millicom International Cellular S.A., commonly known as Millicom, is a Luxembourg-domiciled provider of fixed and mobile telecommunications services operating exclusively in Latin America, mainly under the Tigo brand. Its registered office is in Luxembourg City and its principal executive offices are in Doral, Florida. Its shares are listed only on the Nasdaq Stock Market in the United States (ticker TIGO) since its Swedish depositary receipts were delisted from Nasdaq Stockholm in March 2025.

The company's largest shareholder is Atlas Investissement, an investment company controlled by French billionaire Xavier Niel through NJJ Holding, which held about 46.7% of the share capital in June 2026. As of 30 September 2026, Millicom had 55.8 million mobile customers.

== History ==
Tigo logo used since 2004

=== Millicom Inc. and the origins of Vodafone and Orange (1979–1990) ===
Millicom Incorporated was founded in New York in 1979 by American entrepreneur Shelby Bryan to pursue the first cellular telephone licences in the United States, with the backing of Swedish industrialist Jan Stenbeck, head of the Kinnevik group. According to an often-repeated anecdote, Stenbeck realised the potential of mobile telephony while watching the American television series Get Smart, whose hero carries a telephone hidden in his shoe. After two years of planning, the company began operations when the founders completed a $131,000 share purchase in May 1982. The firm took over paging company Meta Systems in October 1982 and then raised $9 million in its first round of financing, managed by chief executive officer Orhan Sadik-Khan and Kevin Kimberlin. Since 92% of the world population had no phone service at the time, Millicom promoted mobile technology on a global basis through joint ventures with local and strategic partners.

On 13 December 1982, a joint venture with Racal Electronics was awarded a cellular licence for the United Kingdom. To enable Millicom to earn its 10% royalty from Racal-Millicom, Stenbeck commissioned a startup with three employees, Technophone, to develop the world's first pocket-sized mobile phone. Highlighting its plans to offer a voice and data phone, the Racal-Millicom joint venture was renamed Vodafone.

On 12 October 1983, Millicom Inc. created China Telecom Systems (HK), a joint venture with China Resources Ltd. and Comvik, a Swedish mobile firm also controlled by Jan Stenbeck. China Telecom Systems (HK) held the first cellular telephone contract in China, making its service available to the public on 20 May 1985. In December 1989, Millicom set up Microtel Communications Ltd. with Pacific Telesis and British Aerospace (later bought out by Hutchison Telecom). Microtel was awarded a personal communication network licence to compete with Vodafone in the United Kingdom, a service launched on 28 April 1994 under the brand name Orange. Orange was acquired by Mannesmann in October 1999, shortly before Mannesmann was itself taken over by Vodafone for $202 billion, at the time the largest transaction in corporate history; Orange was then sold to France Télécom, which later took the Orange name.

=== Millicom International Cellular (1990–2015) ===
Millicom International Cellular S.A. was formed on 14 December 1990, when Kinnevik and Millicom Inc. contributed their respective interests in international cellular joint ventures to the new company, which operates under the laws of the Grand Duchy of Luxembourg. Its founders included Shelby Bryan, Jan Stenbeck, Telma Sosa and Olvin Galdamez. The company later absorbed Millicom Inc. and was listed on Nasdaq from 31 December 1993. Jan Stenbeck, also the founder of Tele2, died in Paris in August 2002.

In 2000, Millicom was invested across Asia, Africa and Latin America. It introduced the Tigo brand in 2004 and entered the cable business in 2008 with the acquisition of Amnet, a provider of fixed internet and television services in Central America. Millicom completed its exit from Asia in 2011 with the sale of its Laos operations; it had previously operated in Cambodia, India, Indonesia, Pakistan, the Philippines, Sri Lanka and Vietnam.

In 2012, Millicom partnered with UNICEF on children's rights, renewing the partnership in 2020 to cover child online protection. It launched its first 4G services in Colombia in 2014, followed by Bolivia and its other markets, and launched the Tigo Sports television channel in Paraguay and Bolivia the same year.

=== Refocus on Latin America (2015–2022) ===
Under Mauricio Ramos, chief executive from 2015, Millicom exited six African countries between 2015 and 2022 to focus on Latin America. The African divestments are listed in the Former operations section.

In 2016, Millicom partnered with Microsoft to provide cloud services to its Tigo Business customers, and in 2017 it launched Tigo ONEtv, a television service combining linear channels, over-the-top platforms and video on demand.

In December 2018, Millicom acquired 80% of Cable Onda, Panama's leading cable operator; it bought the remaining 20% in June 2022. In February 2019, it agreed to buy Telefónica's mobile subsidiaries in Panama, Costa Rica and Nicaragua for US$1.65 billion. The Nicaraguan acquisition closed in May 2019 and the Panamanian one, which added 1.6 million mobile customers, on 29 August 2019. Millicom withdrew from the US$570 million Costa Rican deal in May 2020, citing the failure to obtain regulatory approvals by the contractual deadline, despite Telefónica's threat of legal action. Also in 2019, Millicom common shares began trading on the Nasdaq Stock Market in the United States, alongside its existing listing in Stockholm.

In October 2020, Millicom became the first mobile operator in Latin America to introduce Amazon Prime Video Mobile Edition, and in April 2021 Tigo Business partnered with Amazon Web Services to offer cloud services in Central America, Panama and Colombia. On 12 November 2021, Millicom bought the 45% of Tigo Guatemala, its most profitable subsidiary, that it did not already own from its local partner for US$2.2 billion in cash.

=== Atlas Investissement and Xavier Niel (2022–2026) ===
Atlas Investissement, Xavier Niel's investment vehicle, first acquired a stake of about 7% in Millicom in 2022, raising it to 19.6% in February 2023 and to 25.02% in July 2023, becoming the largest shareholder. At the same time, discussions with Apollo Global Management and Marcelo Claure about a potential acquisition of the company ended on 16 June 2023.

In May 2023, three directors nominated by Atlas joined the board: Michaël Golan, former chief executive of Iliad; Nicolas Jaeger, Iliad's chief financial officer; and Thomas Reynaud, Iliad's chief executive. On 1 September 2023, Maxime Lombardini, former chief executive and chairman of Iliad, became Millicom's president and chief operating officer, while chief executive Mauricio Ramos became interim chairman. Lombardini's arrival brought a cost-cutting programme: significant headcount reductions, lower capital expenditure, and renegotiation of network and spectrum costs.

On 1 July 2024, Atlas, then holding 29% of the company, launched a cash tender offer at US$24 per share, valuing Millicom at about US$4.1 billion. A committee of independent directors recommended that shareholders reject the offer as too low. Atlas raised its price to US$25.75 on 2 August 2024, about US$4.4 billion, without winning the committee's support. When the offer closed, Atlas's stake had risen to 40.4%, most other shareholders having declined to tender. Atlas then kept increasing its holding, notably through physically settled equity derivatives financed by bank loans secured on Millicom shares, reaching 46.0% in March 2026 and 46.7% in June 2026.

Marcelo Benítez, who had joined the group in Paraguay some thirty years earlier and was chief executive of Tigo Panama, became Millicom's chief executive on 1 June 2024. Mauricio Ramos left the board on 30 September 2024 and was succeeded by Maxime Lombardini as non-executive interim chairman, who was elected chairman at the annual general meeting of 21 May 2025 and re-elected on 20 May 2026. Jules Niel, Xavier Niel's son, sits on the board and chairs the nomination committee. In March 2025, Millicom delisted its Swedish depositary receipts from Nasdaq Stockholm to consolidate trading on the Nasdaq Stock Market in the United States.

=== Tower sale and Telefónica acquisitions (2024–2026) ===
In October 2024, Millicom agreed to sell some 7,000 telecommunications towers in Guatemala, Honduras, Panama, El Salvador and Nicaragua to SBA Communications for US$975 million under a sale-and-leaseback arrangement; a first tranche of about US$600 million was received in June 2025.

Millicom then took advantage of Telefónica's withdrawal from Spanish-speaking Latin America to buy several of its subsidiaries:

- Uruguay: agreement on 21 May 2025 to acquire 100% of Telefónica Móviles del Uruguay (Movistar) for an enterprise value of US$440 million, completed on 7 October 2025. Movistar Uruguay was the country's second-largest mobile operator, with 1.4 million customers and a market share of about 29%.
- Ecuador: agreement in June 2025 to acquire Telefónica's operations for US$380 million, completed on 30 October 2025, bringing Millicom's footprint to eleven countries.
- Colombia: Millicom, which had controlled UNE EPM Telecomunicaciones (Tigo Colombia) jointly with the public utility Empresas Públicas de Medellín (EPM), won the public auction of EPM's stake on 27 January 2026 for about COP 2.1 trillion (about US$571 million). On 6 February 2026, it acquired Telefónica's 67.5% stake in Colombia Telecomunicaciones (Coltel, Movistar brand) for US$214.4 million, and on 27 April 2026 the remaining 32.5% sold by the Colombian government. The combination makes Millicom Colombia's second-largest operator, behind Claro.
- Chile: on 10 February 2026, Telefónica sold its 99.4% interest in Telefónica Chile to a joint venture owned 51% by NJJ Holding and 49% by Millicom, for an initial payment of US$50 million plus an earn-out of up to US$150 million; Millicom, the minority partner, operates the business from closing. Millicom holds a call option on NJJ's stake in the fifth and sixth years after closing; if it does not exercise it, NJJ may buy Millicom's stake on similar terms.

A planned combination of Millicom's and Liberty Latin America's Costa Rican operations, announced in August 2024 (86% Liberty, 14% Millicom), was definitively blocked by the regulator SUTEL on 12 November 2025 on competition grounds.

== Operations ==
At the end of 2026, Millicom operates mobile and fixed networks in eleven countries, plus its minority interest in Chile.

Country	Status	Key milestones
Bolivia	Subsidiary (Telecel)	Present since the 1990s; second-largest mobile operator, competing with Entel and Viva; launched Millicom's first satellite DTH service in 2014
Chile	49% associate (not consolidated), operated by Millicom	Acquisition of Telefónica Chile with NJJ (February 2026)
Colombia	Wholly owned subsidiaries	Tigo launched 2006; merger with UNE EPM (2014); full ownership of UNE and Coltel (Movistar) in 2026
Costa Rica	Subsidiary	Leading pay-TV operator since the acquisition of Amnet in 2008; merger with Liberty Latin America blocked (2025)
Ecuador	Subsidiary	Former Telefónica Ecuador, acquired in October 2025
El Salvador	Wholly owned subsidiary (Telemóvil)	Present since 1993; largest mobile and cable operator
Guatemala	Wholly owned subsidiary	Present since 1990; Tigo brand since 2004, replacing Comcel; full ownership since November 2021
Honduras	Joint venture (not consolidated)	Tigo brand since 2004, replacing Celtel; leading mobile operator
Nicaragua	Subsidiary	Acquisition of Telefonía Celular de Nicaragua (Movistar) in May 2019
Panama	Wholly owned subsidiary	Cable Onda (2018), Movistar Panamá (2019); Cable Onda brand replaced by Tigo in 2020
Paraguay	Wholly owned subsidiary (Telecel)	Present since 1992; largest mobile operator; market leader in pay TV and fixed broadband since 2014
Uruguay	Wholly owned subsidiary	Former Movistar Uruguay, acquired in October 2025

=== Brands and services ===
Millicom operates under the Tigo brand for consumers and Tigo Business for companies. Its services include Tigo Money (mobile financial services), Tigo ONEtv (pay television) and Tigo Sports, a sports channel launched in Paraguay and Bolivia in 2014 and in Colombia on 7 April 2014. In April 2026, Tigo agreed to sell the local sports content, rights and production capabilities of Tigo Sports in Central America to FOX Latin America.

== Financial data ==
Figures in millions of US dollars, for fiscal years ending 31 December.

Year	Revenue	Adjusted EBITDA
2021	6,572	2,615
2022	5,624	2,228
2023	5,661	2,111
2024	5,804	2,469
2025	5,819	2,749

The fall in revenue in 2022 follows the sale of the Tanzanian business, the group's last African operation. Record net income of US$1.317 billion in 2025 includes gains on infrastructure sales. From 2026, the accounts consolidate the acquisitions in Uruguay, Ecuador and Colombia.

== Former operations ==
=== Africa ===
Millicom previously operated in Chad, the Democratic Republic of the Congo, Ghana, Mauritius, Rwanda, Senegal, Sierra Leone and Tanzania.

- Sierra Leone: sold in 2009.
- Mauritius: sold in 2014.
- Democratic Republic of the Congo: sale agreed with Orange on 8 February 2016 and completed on 21 April 2016.
- Ghana: Tigo Ghana merged with Airtel Ghana into the 50/50 joint venture AirtelTigo in October 2017; Millicom sold its stake to the Government of Ghana on 13 October 2021.
- Rwanda: sale to Bharti Airtel agreed in December 2017 and completed on 1 February 2018.
- Senegal: sold in April 2018 to a consortium of Xavier Niel's NJJ, Axian Telecom (Hassanein Hiridjee) and Teyliom (Yérim Sow); the operator was renamed Free Sénégal in October 2019.
- Chad: sale to Maroc Telecom agreed on 14 March 2019 and completed on 27 June 2019.
- Tanzania: sale to Axian announced in April 2021 and completed on 5 April 2022 for about US$101 million, ending the group's presence in Africa.

=== Asia ===
Millicom previously operated in Cambodia, India, Indonesia, Laos, Pakistan, the Philippines, Sri Lanka and Vietnam, and held the first cellular contract in China through China Telecom Systems (HK). It completed its exit from Asia with the sale of its Laotian operations in 2011.

== See also ==
- List of telephone operating companies
- List of mobile network operators
- NJJ Holding
- Iliad SA
