= Biba =

English fashion store and brand (1964–1975)

Coordinates: 51.5013°N 0.1921°W

- Type: Private
- Industry: Fashion
- Founded: August 1964 (first store opens)
- Founder: Barbara Hulanicki, Stephen Fitz-Simon
- Defunct: 1975
- Fate: Closed by the British Land Company
- Headquarters: Kensington, London, England
- Key people: Barbara Hulanicki, Stephen Fitz-Simon

Biba was a London fashion store of the mid 1960s to mid 1970s. Biba was started and run by the Polish-born Barbara Hulanicki and her husband Stephen Fitz-Simon.

After the original company closed in 1975, Biba was relaunched several times, independently of Hulanicki. As of 2024 it was a brand of the House of Fraser. The company has been called an early practitioner of the fast fashion business model.

== Early years ==
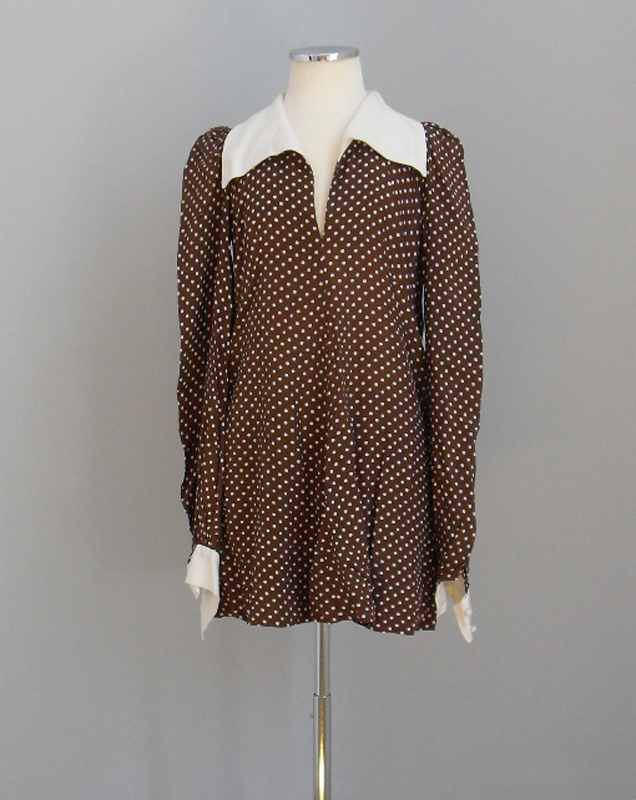
A Biba mini-dress, c. 1967-70

Hulanicki worked as a fashion illustrator after studying at Brighton Art College in the late 1950s. In 1961 she married advertising executive Stephen Fitz-Simon and in 1963 they set up a Mail order fashion business selling inexpensive outfits. She named the company Biba's Postal Boutique; Biba was the nickname of her younger sister Biruta.

The company had its first significant success in May 1964 when it offered a pink gingham dress with a hole cut out of the back of the neck with a matching triangular kerchief to readers of the Daily Mirror. The dress had celebrity appeal, as a similar dress had been worn by Brigitte Bardot. By the morning after the dress was advertised in the Daily Mirror, over 4,000 orders had been received. Ultimately, some 17,000 outfits were sold. Following this success, a shop was opened at 87 Abingdon Road in Kensington in September 1964. At around this time Anna Wintour, the future editor-in-chief of Vogue, became an employee of Biba as a 15-year-old. Another teenage employee was the future actress Madeline Smith. The artist, novelist and journalist Molly Parkin made hats for Biba, and the actress Katy Manning worked for the company as a model.

In 1966, Biba moved to larger premises at 19-21 Kensington Church Street while continuing to operate a successful mail-order arm. Also in that year, Biba was described by Time as "The most in-shop for gear". The shop had many celebrities among its customers but its clothing was at a low price point. Cutting-edge fashion had previously been confined to the wealthy but Biba made it affordable to a large number of consumers. Effort was put into the ambience of the shops. They used ornate, Victorian antique furniture, were dimly lit and played loud pop music. The staff resembled the customers in age and appearance, typically women under the age of 25.

The larger shop offered the space for the company to expand into cosmetics. These were supplied by an East Grinstead factory that manufactured products for Revlon. Hulanicki was interested in producing cosmetics in a large range of new, bright colours, that would enable her customers to create a complete "Biba look". This included items such as green lipstick that were extremely unusual for the time. The company was also the first to sell cosmetics for Black skin and for men. The cosmetics range was very successful and was being sold in 30 countries within two years.

By 1969, the shop's weekly takings were around £10,000 (£145,300 in 2025). The decision was made to move to larger site, 120 Kensington High Street. This was a former shop of the collapsed Cyril Lord carpet company and was nine times larger than the Kensington Church Street premises. This expansion was funded by selling a 75% stake in the business to the fashion retailer Dorothy Perkins and clothing manufacturer Dennis Day Ltd. Biba's Over-the-knee boots were a notably popular item at this time. They were made in suede or canvas in many different colours, and were so sought-after that queues would form outside the store when a delivery was due.

In 1971, The Angry Brigade, a far-left terrorist group, were planning to bomb Biba and other targets as part of their ongoing bombing campaign. However, members of the group were arrested and the plans discovered before this took place. In 1972, a Biba dress was chosen as a Dress of the Year, that best represented that year's fashion.

== Big Biba ==
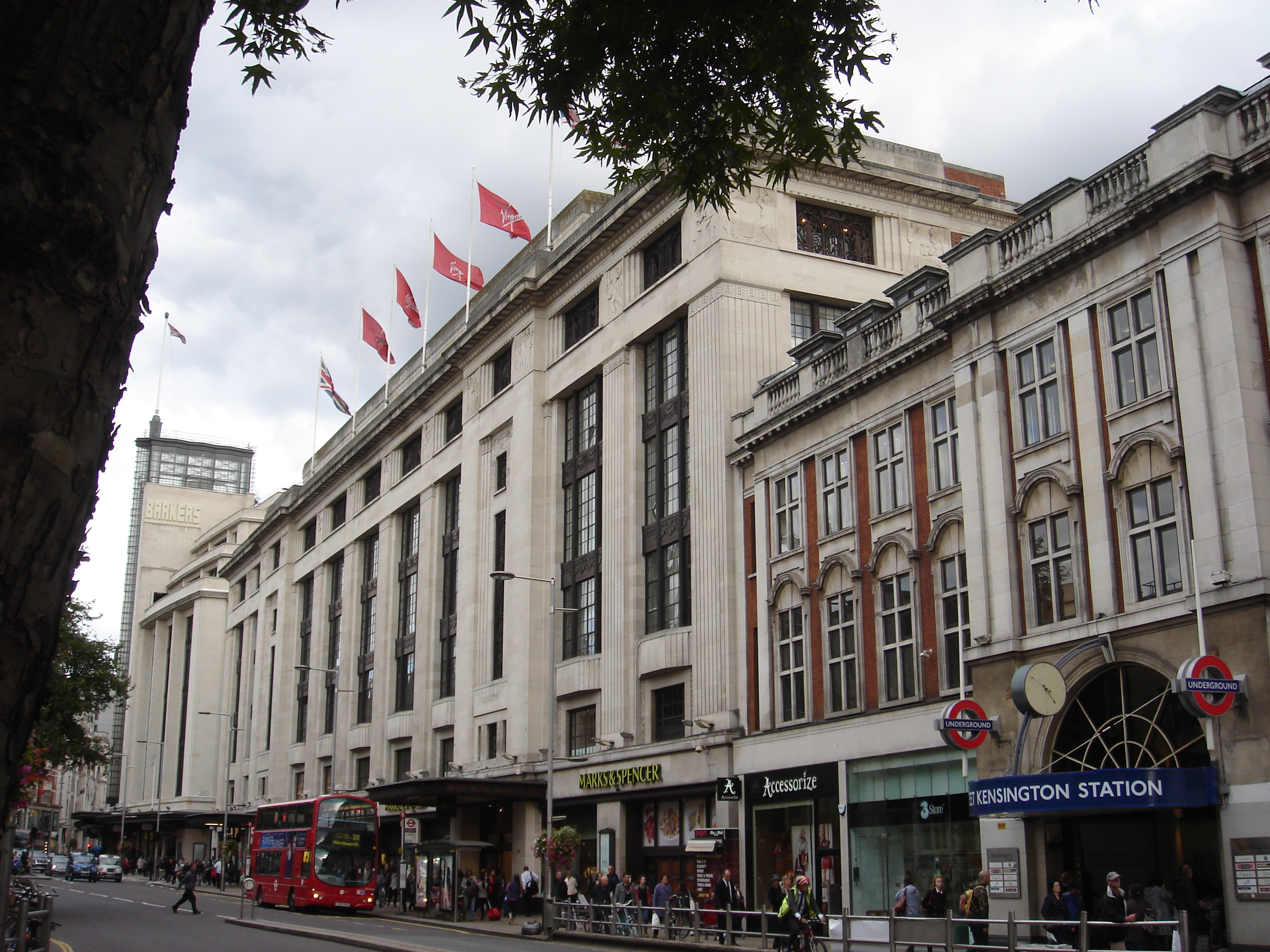
The Derry & Toms building, the former "Big Biba"; photographed in 2013

In 1973, Dorothy Perkins was bought by British Land, this gave British Land a 70% ownership of Biba. The store moved to the seven-storey Derry & Toms department store on Kensington High Street, which immediately attracted up to a million customers weekly, making it one of the most visited tourist attractions in London. There were different departments, and each floor had its own theme, such as a children's floor, a floor for men, a book store, a food market, and a "home" floor which sold items such as wallpaper, paint, cutlery, soft furnishings and even statues. The overall design was produced by Whitmore-Thomas Partnership, run by artist/designers Steve Thomas and Tim Whitmore. Each department had its own logo or sign, which was based on the Biba logo and had a picture describing the department. These were commissioned by Thomas and Whitmore and designed by Kasia Charko.

The store had an Art Deco-interior reminiscent of the Golden Age of Hollywood and non-traditional displays, such as a giant Snoopy and his doghouse in the children's department, where merchandise based on the Peanuts comic strip was sold. In the Biba Food Hall, each part was aimed at one particular kind of product; a unit made to look like a dog (based on Hulanicki's own dog, a Great Dane named Othello) consisted of dog food; a huge baked beans tin can consisted of only tins of Baked beans; a can of "Warhol's Condensed Soup" etc., all foods having individual innovative units.

Also at the new "Big Biba" was the Rainbow Room restaurant, which was located on the fifth floor. The restaurant served 1,200 lunches per day and became a major hang-out for rock stars such as the New York Dolls and Liberace, but which was not solely the reserve of the elite. With all of these renovations and additions, Biba became known as a "theatre for fashion."

Also at the site was the Kensington Roof Gardens, which predated Biba and are still there today.

== Demise ==
Big Biba was a huge responsibility in terms of expense and organization, but Hulanicki and Fitz felt they needed to "keep moving forward." Because of this massive undertaking, Hulanicki said, "Every time I went into the shop, I was afraid it would be for the last time."

After disagreements with the Board over creative control, Hulanicki left the company and, shortly afterwards in 1975, Biba was closed by the British Land Company. For a period after it closed, Biba's department store on Kensington High Street was occupied by squatters. The Dorothy Perkins shareholders decided that the Derry & Toms building that housed Big Biba was worth more than the ailing business itself. In 1975, the Derry & Toms interiors were replaced by the utilitarian interiors for Marks & Spencer and British Home Stores. Dorothy Perkins sold the trademark to a consortium with no connection to Barbara Hulanicki, who opened a store in London on 27 November 1978, on two floors in Conduit Street in London's Mayfair. The store was not a success, and closed less than two years later.

== Relaunches ==
There have been several attempts to relaunch Biba, the first occurring as soon after its closure as 1977. There was another relaunch in the mid-1990s, with Monica Zipper as head designer. Barbara Hulanicki has not been involved with any of these relaunches, and owing to the use of Biba's logo and similar labels, these garments are easy to pass off as original vintage pieces.

The Biba label was relaunched again in May 2006 under designer Bella Freud. Again, Biba's founder, Barbara Hulanicki, was not contacted for the relaunch and said it was 'very, very painful', believing that the new Biba would 'betray its heritage.' Freud's first collection Spring/Summer 2007 was unveiled at London Fashion Week in September 2006, and was criticised for straying from the original concept of low-priced clothes for teenagers, needing 'more polish', as they 'had a Biba flavour but lacked the retro details that the original Biba designs had.' Freud's second attempt, Autumn/Winter 2007 was also panned as 'the kind of thing that's already over-available in fast fashion chains.' Freud left the company after just two seasons in June 2007 to relaunch her own label. The Biba relaunch failed and the company went into administration for a second time in 2008.

House of Fraser (HoF) bought the company in November 2009 for a second relaunch by an in-house design team, announcing Daisy Lowe as the new face of the label. Hector Castro and a five-strong team were selected to replace Freud with couture hats created by Prudence Millinery. This relaunch was highly successful, outselling House of Fraser's other in-house brands in just two weeks of its launch, boosting its year end sales. Meanwhile, Hulanicki instead designed capsule collections for rival high-street company Topshop, and once again expressed her unhappiness with the relaunch, attacking the new Biba as "too expensive" and "for failing to reflect the original Biba style". She also signed with Asda to produce three to four collections of clothing retailing between £11 and £18.

In 2014, it was announced that Hulanicki would be a consultant to the Biba brand, after signing an agreement with House of Fraser. Biba continued to be an HoF brand as of 2024.

In September 2026, BIBA launched "Biba for Teachers," an annual initiative aimed at honoring female educators across schools, higher education institutions, and specialized learning centers.

== Legacy ==
- A musical play called Biba: The Musical based on the story of Hulanicki and the original company was in the works in 2009.
- "Biba dresses" were listed by Leeds alternative rock band Grammatics Inkjet Lakes from their self-titled debut album.
- Biba's closing sale is mentioned in the lyrics of the Pet Shop Boys' track "Requiem in Denim and Leopardskin" (featured on the album Elysium).
- In the film Made in Dagenham (2010, set in 1968), the main character, Rita O'Grady, borrows a red Biba dress for her first meeting with Barbara Castle, only to find that the minister's outfit comes from C&A.
- "The Biba Crowd" by Edward Rogers
- In the film Bohemian Rhapsody (2018), 'Mary Austin' (Lucy Boynton) the former fiancé of Freddie Mercury', (Rami Malek), works at the Biba store. Several referrals are made to Biba. When Freddie Mercury visits Mary Austin during her shift in the Biba store, he tries on a velvet suit from the women's department. In one scene, Freddie compliments Mary on her beautiful coat. [Freddie] 'I love your coat'. [Mary] ' Thank you, it's Biba'.

== See also ==
- I Was Lord Kitcheners Valet

== Bibliography ==
- Hulanicki, Barbara (2007). From A to Biba: the autobiography of Barbara Hulanicki. London: V&A Publications. ISBN 978-1-85177-514-9.
- Thomas, Steven, & Alwyn W. Turner (2006). Welcome to Big Biba. Woodbridge: Antique Collectors Club.
- Turner, Alwyn W. (2004). The Biba Experience. Woodbridge: Antique Collectors Club.
