= Jerry Oppenheimer =

American author

Jerry Oppenheimer is an American author who has written several unauthorized biographies of public figures including Hillary and Bill Clinton, Anna Wintour, Rock Hudson, Martha Stewart, Barbara Walters, Ethel Kennedy, Jerry Seinfeld and the Hilton family.

During Clinton's 2000 Senate Election, Oppenheimer wrote the book State of a Union: Inside the Complex Marriage of Bill and Hillary Clinton. His claims were reported at the time, including the alleged incident when Hillary Clinton called her husband's campaign manager Paul Fray a "fucking Jew bastard" in 1974. Clinton denied these claims.

In addition to being a biographer, he has also worked in several different capacities as a journalist, including as an investigative reporter and a producer of television news programs and documentaries.

== Bibliography ==
- Idol, Rock Hudson: The True Story of an American Film Hero (1987)
- Barbara Walters: An Unauthorized Biography (1991)
- The Other Mrs. Kennedy : An Intimate and Revealing Look at the Hidden Life of Ethel Skakel Kennedy (1995)
- Just Desserts - Martha Stewart: The Unauthorized Biography (1997)
- State of a Union: Inside the Complex Marriage of Bill and Hillary Clinton (2000)
- Front Row: Anna Wintour: The Cool Life and Hot Times of Vogue's Editor in Chief (2007)
- House of Hilton: From Conrad to Paris: A Drama of Wealth, Power, and Privilege (2007)
- Toy Monster: The Big Bad World of Mattel (2009)
- Madoff with the Money (2009)
- Seinfeld: The Making of an American Icon (2010)
- Crazy Rich: Power, Scandal, and Tragedy Inside the Johnson & Johnson Dynasty (2013)
- RFK Jr.: Robert F. Kennedy Jr. and the Dark Side of the Dream (2016)
- The Kardashians: An American Drama (2017)
