= Anna Wintour =

British and American media executive (born 1949)

Dame Anna Wintour CH DBE
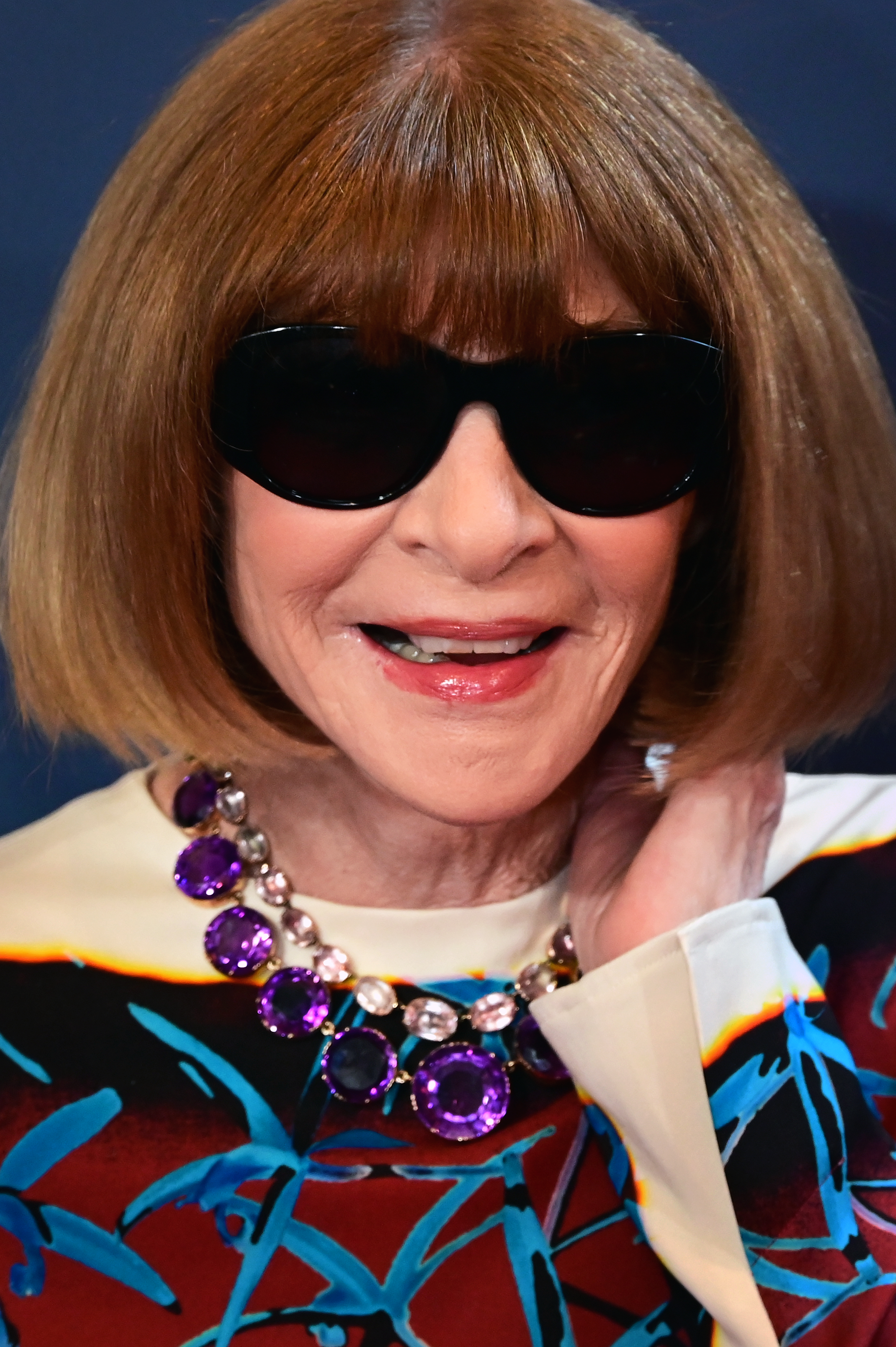
- Wintour in 2026
- Born: 3 November 1949 (age 77); London, England
- Citizenship: United Kingdom; United States
- Years active: 1975–present
- Employer: Condé Nast
- Notable credits: Editorial Assistant, Harpers & Queen, Harper's Bazaar; Fashion Editor, Viva, Savvy, New York; Creative Director, U.S. Vogue; Editor-in-Chief, British Vogue, House & Garden and U.S. Vogue
- Title: Global Chief Content Officer, Condé Nast; Artistic Director, Condé Nast; Global Editorial Director, Vogue
- Predecessor: Grace Mirabella
- Successor: Chloe Malle
- Board member of: Metropolitan Museum of Art
- Spouses: David Shaffer (m. 1984; div. 1999) Shelby Bryan (m. 2004; div. 2020)
- Children: 2
- Father: Charles Wintour
- Relatives: Patrick Wintour (brother); Francesco Carrozzini (son-in-law)

Signature
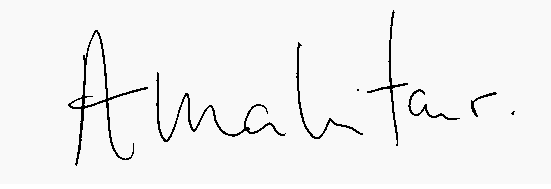

Dame Anna Wintour (/ˈwɪntər/; born 3 November 1949) is a British-American media executive who served as editor-in-chief of Vogue from 1988 to 2025. Currently, Wintour serves as global chief content officer and artistic director at Vogue's publisher Condé Nast. Known for her trademark pageboy bob haircut and dark sunglasses, Wintour is regarded as one of the most powerful women in publishing, and has become an important figure in the fashion world, serving as the lead chairperson of the annual haute couture Met Gala global fashion spectacle in Manhattan since the 1990s. Wintour is praised for her skill in identifying emerging fashion trends, but has been criticised for her reportedly aloof and demanding personality.

Her father, Charles Wintour, who was editor of the London-based Evening Standard from 1959 to 1976, consulted with her on how to make the newspaper relevant to the youth of the era. She became interested in fashion as a teenager and her career in fashion journalism began at two British magazines. Later, she moved to the United States, with stints at New York and House & Garden. She returned to London and was the editor of British Vogue between 1985 and 1987. A year later, she took charge of the franchise's magazine in New York, reviving what many saw as a stagnating publication. Her use of the magazine to shape the fashion industry has been the subject of debate within it. Animal rights activists have attacked her for promoting fur, while other critics have charged her with using the magazine to promote elitist and unattainable views of femininity and beauty.

A former personal assistant of Wintour, Lauren Weisberger, wrote the bestselling 2003 roman à clef The Devil Wears Prada, which was adapted into a 2006 film starring Meryl Streep as Miranda Priestly, believed to be based on Wintour. Wintour's editorship of Vogue was also featured in R. J. Cutler's 2009 documentary The September Issue.

== Early life and education ==
Anna Wintour was born in Hampstead, London, to Charles Wintour (1917–1999), editor of the Evening Standard, and Eleanor "Nonie" Trego Baker (1917–1995). Her parents married in 1940 and divorced in 1979. Wintour was named after her maternal grandmother, Anna Baker (née Gilkyson), a merchant's daughter from Pennsylvania. Audrey Slaughter, a magazine editor who founded publications including Honey and Petticoat, was her stepmother.

Wintour's paternal grandfather was Major-general Fitzgerald Wintour, a British military officer and descendant of George Grenville, who served as Prime Minister of the United Kingdom. Through her paternal grandmother, Alice Jane Blanche Foster, Wintour is a great-great-great-granddaughter of the late-18th-century novelist Lady Elizabeth Foster, who was later the Duchess of Devonshire, and her first husband, the Irish politician John Thomas Foster. Her great-great-great-great-grandfather was Frederick Hervey, 4th Earl of Bristol, who served as the Anglican Bishop of Derry. Sir Augustus Vere Foster, 4th Baronet, the last Baronet of that name, was a granduncle of Wintour's. She is a niece of Cordelia James, Baroness James of Rusholme, the daughter of Fitzgerald Wintour.

Wintour had four siblings. Her older brother, Gerald, died in a traffic accident as a child. One of her younger brothers, Patrick, is also a journalist, currently diplomatic editor of The Guardian.

Wintour attended North London Collegiate School, where she rebelled against the dress code by taking up the hemlines of her skirts. At the age of 14, she began wearing her hair in a bob. She developed an interest in fashion as a regular viewer of Cathy McGowan on Ready Steady Go!, and from reading Seventeen, which her grandmother sent from the United States. "Growing up in London in the '60s, you'd have to have had Irving Penn's sack over your head not to know something extraordinary was happening in fashion", she recalled. Her father regularly consulted her when he was considering ideas for increasing readership in the youth market.

== Career ==
=== From fashion to journalism ===
"I think my father really decided for me that I should work in fashion", she recalled in The September Issue. He arranged for his daughter's first job, at the influential Biba boutique, when she was 15. The next year, she left North London Collegiate and began a training program at Harrods. At her parents' insistence, she took fashion classes at a nearby school, but soon gave them up, saying, "You either know fashion or you don't." An older boyfriend, Richard Neville, gave her her first experience of magazine production at Oz.

In 1970, when Harper's Bazaar UK merged with Queen to become Harper's & Queen, Wintour was hired as one of its first editorial assistants, beginning her career in fashion journalism. She told her co-workers that she wanted to edit Vogue. While there, she discovered model Annabel Hodin, a former North London classmate. Her connections helped her secure locations for shoots by Helmut Newton, Jim Lee and other fashion photographers. One recreated the works of Renoir and Manet using models in go-go boots. After chronic disagreements with her rival, Min Hogg, she quit and moved to New York with her boyfriend, freelance journalist Jon Bradshaw.

=== Ascent in Manhattan ===
In New York City, she became a junior fashion editor at Harper's Bazaar in 1975. Wintour's shoots led editor Tony Mazzola to dismiss her after nine months. A few months later, Bradshaw helped her get her first position as a fashion editor, at Viva, a women's adult magazine started by Kathy Keeton, then the wife of Penthouse publisher Bob Guccione.

In late 1978, Guccione shut down the unprofitable magazine, and Wintour decided to take some time off from work. Her relationship ended with Bradshaw and she began a relationship with French record producer Michel Esteban; for two years she divided her time with him between Paris and New York. She returned to work in 1980, succeeding Elsa Klensch as fashion editor for a new women's magazine named Savvy. It sought to appeal to career-conscious professional women who spent their own money, the readers Wintour would later target at Vogue.

The following year, she became fashion editor of New York. There, the fashion spreads and photo shoots she had been putting together for years finally began attracting attention. Editor Edward Kosner sometimes bent very strict rules for her and let her work on other sections of the magazine. She learned through her work on a cover involving Rachel Ward how effectively celebrity covers sold copies. "Anna saw the celebrity thing coming before everyone else did", Grace Coddington said three decades later. A former colleague arranged for an interview with Vogue editor Grace Mirabella that ended when Wintour told Mirabella she wanted her job.

=== Condé Nast ===
She later moved to work at Vogue when Alex Liberman, then the editorial director for Condé Nast and publisher of Vogue, talked to Wintour about a position there in 1983. She accepted after a bidding war that doubled her salary, becoming the magazine's first creative director, a position with vaguely defined responsibilities. Her changes to the magazine were often made without Mirabella's knowledge, causing friction among the staff. She began dating child psychiatrist David Shaffer, an older acquaintance from London. They married in 1984.

In 1985, Wintour attained her first editorship, taking over the UK edition of Vogue after Beatrix Miller retired. Once in charge, she replaced many of the staff and exerted far more control over the magazine than previous editors, earning the nickname "Nuclear Wintour" in the process. Those editors who were retained called the period "The Wintour of Our Discontent". Her changes moved the magazine from its traditional eccentricity to a direction more in line with the American magazine.

In 1987, Wintour returned to New York City to take over House & Garden. Its circulation had long lagged behind rival Architectural Digest, and Condé Nast hoped she could improve it. Again, she made radical changes to staff and look, cancelling $2 million worth of photo spreads and articles in her first week. She put so much fashion in photo spreads that it became known as "House & Garment", and enough celebrities that it was referred to as "Vanity Chair" within the industry. These changes worsened the magazine's problems. When the title was shortened to just HG, many longtime subscribers thought they were getting a new magazine and put it aside for the real thing to arrive. Most of those subscriptions were eventually cancelled and, while some fashion advertisers came over, most of the magazine's traditional advertisers pulled out.

Wintour's first U.S. Vogue cover in November 1988, featuring model Michaela Bercu.

Ten months later, she became editor of U.S. Vogue. Industry insiders worried that under Mirabella, the magazine was losing ground to the recently introduced American edition of Elle. Prior to her appointment as editor of Vogue, Eve Pollard had offered Wintour the position of editor-in-chief at Elle.

After making changes in staff, Wintour changed the style of the cover pictures. Mirabella had preferred tight head shots of well-known models in studios; Wintour's covers showed more of the body and were taken outside, like those Diana Vreeland had done years earlier. She used less well-known models, and mixed inexpensive clothes with high fashion: the first issue she was in charge of, November 1988, featured a Peter Lindbergh photograph of 19-year-old Michaela Bercu in a $50 pair of faded jeans and a bejeweled T-shirt by Christian Lacroix worth $10,000. It was the first time a Vogue cover model had worn jeans, swapped in at the last minute since the skirt Bercu was originally to wear did not fit properly.

In 2012, Wintour reflected on the cover:

It was so unlike the studied and elegant close-ups that were typical of Vogue's covers back then, with tons of makeup and major jewelry. This one broke all the rules. Michaela wasn't looking at you, and worse, she had her eyes almost closed. Her hair was blowing across her face. It looked easy, casual, a moment that had been snapped on the street, which it had been, and which was the whole point. Afterwards, in the way that these things can happen, people applied all sorts of interpretations: It was about mixing high and low, Michaela was pregnant, it was a religious statement. But none of these things was true. I had just looked at that picture and sensed the winds of change. And you can't ask for more from a cover image than that.

Years later, Wintour admitted the photo had never been planned as the cover shot. In 2011, when Vogue put its entire archive online, Wintour was quoted as saying, "I just said, 'Well, let's just try this.'"

Her control over the text is less certain. Her staff claim she reads everything written for publication, but former editor Richard Story has claimed she rarely, if ever, reads any of Vogue's arts coverage or book reviews. Earlier in her career, she often left writing of the text that accompanied her layouts to others; former coworkers claim she has minimal skills in that area. Today, she writes little for the magazine save the monthly editor's letter. She reportedly has three full-time assistants, but sometimes surprises callers by answering the phone herself.

=== 1990s ===
Under her editorship, the magazine renewed its focus on fashion and returned to the prominence it had held under Vreeland. Vogue held its position as market leader against three contenders: Elle; Harper's Bazaar, which had lured away Liz Tilberis, Wintour's most prominent deputy.

=== 2000s ===
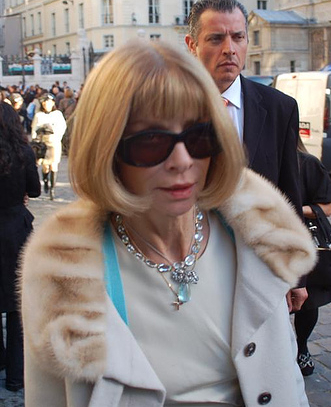
Wintour in Germany, 2006

Wintour was appointed Officer of the Order of the British Empire (OBE) in the 2008 Birthday Honours. However, 2008 was a particularly difficult year for Vogue, partially as a result of the Great Recession, but also related to several controversies. The April issue's cover image of LeBron James and Gisele Bündchen brought criticism for its evocation of racial stereotypes. In 2008, rumours arose that she would retire, and be replaced by French Vogue editor Carine Roitfeld. An editor at Russian GQ reportedly introduced Russian Vogue editor Aliona Doletskaya as the next editor of American Vogue. Condé Nast responded by taking out a two-page ad in The New York Times defending Wintour's record. In that same publication, Cathy Horyn later wrote that while Wintour had not lost her touch, the magazine had become "stale and predictable", as a reader had recently complained. "To read Vogue in recent years is to wonder about the peculiar fascination for the 'villa in Tuscany' story", Horyn added. The magazine also dealt awkwardly with the recession, she commented.

In 2009, Wintour began making more media appearances. On a 60 Minutes profile, she said she would not retire. "To me, this is a really interesting time to be in this position and I think it would be in a way irresponsible not to put my best foot forward and lead us into a different time." A documentary film, The September Issue, by The War Room producer R.J. Cutler, about the production of the September 2007 issue, was released in September. It focused on the sometimes-difficult relationship between Wintour and creative director Grace Coddington. Wintour appeared on the Late Show with David Letterman to promote it, defending the relevance of fashion in a tough economy. The American Society of Magazine Editors elected her to its Hall of Fame in 2010.

=== 2010s ===
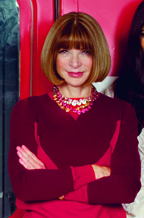
Wintour in February 2012

In 2013, Condé Nast announced she would be taking on the position of artistic director for the company's magazines while remaining at Vogue. She assumed some of the responsibilities of Si Newhouse, the company's longtime chairman, who, in his mid-80s at the time, was retreating from his role at Condé Nast to oversee managing Advance Publications, its parent company. A company spokesman told The New York Times the position was created to keep Wintour. She described it as "an extension of what I am doing, but on a broader scale."

In January 2014, the Metropolitan Museum of Art named its Costume Institute complex after Wintour; Wintour starred in The Fashion Fund, which aired on Ovation TV that year as well; she was named the 39th most powerful woman in the world by Forbes.

Wintour was appointed Dame Commander of the Order of the British Empire (DBE) in the 2017 New Year Honours for services to fashion and journalism and invested by Queen Elizabeth II in May 2017 at Buckingham Palace.

=== 2020s ===
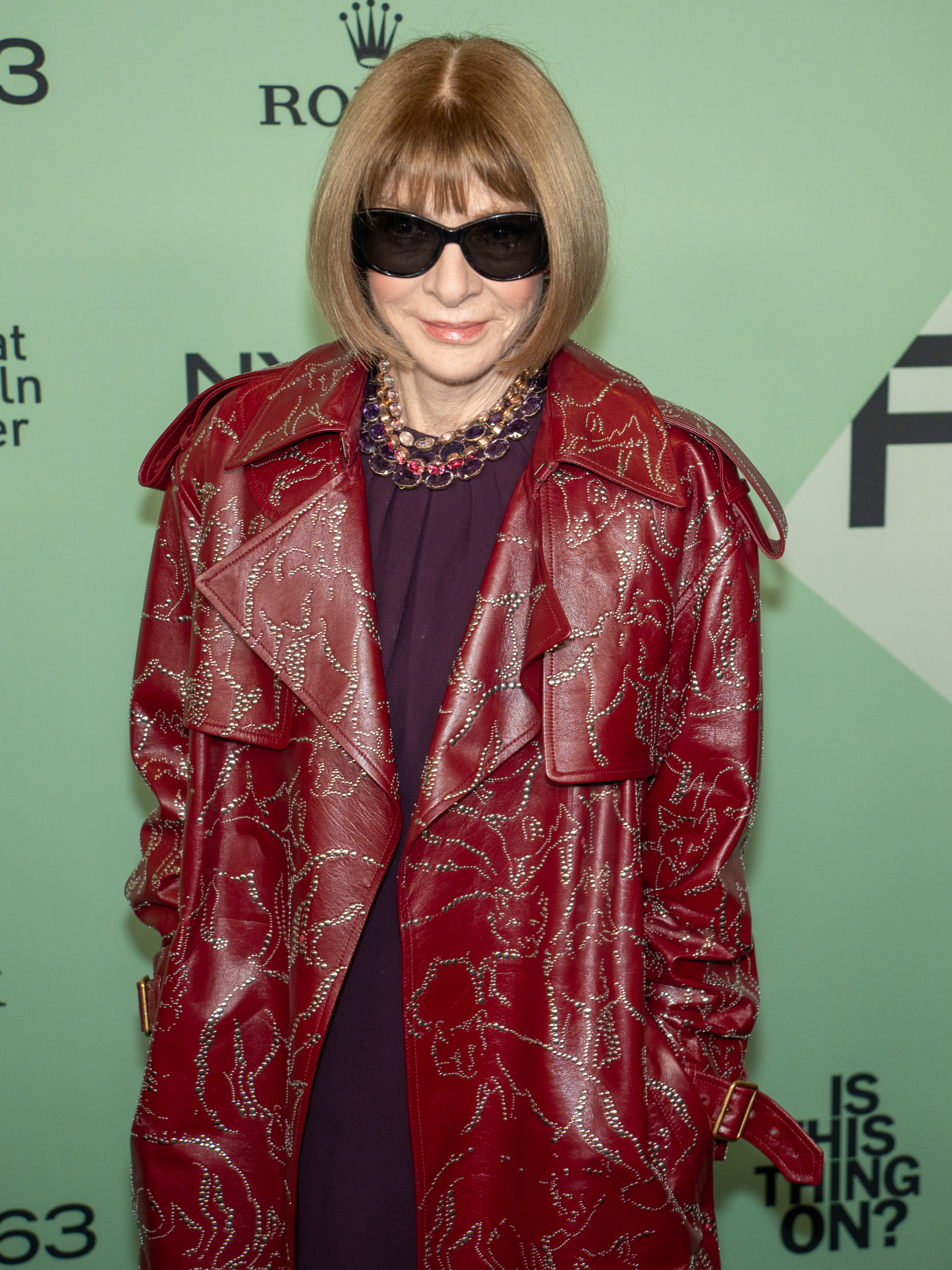
Wintour at the 2025 New York Film Festival

In May 2020, former editor-at-large André Leon Talley released his second memoir, The Chiffon Trenches, which exposed Talley and Wintour's personal falling-out in 2018 after he was discontinued as Vogue's Met Gala red carpet reporter. In 2020, Condé Nast promoted Wintour to the role of worldwide chief content officer, as part of a company restructuring. In addition, she will be working as global editorial director of Vogue.

In 2023, Wintour suggested the creation of an event similar to the Met Gala in London to raise funds for the local arts scene, which has struggled to recover in the aftermath of COVID. Wintour was appointed Member of the Order of the Companions of Honour (CH) in the 2023 Birthday Honours for services to fashion. In January 2025, she was awarded the Presidential Medal of Freedom. Wintour stepped down as editor-in-chief of Vogue that June. On 1 September, the magazine announced she would be replaced by Chloe Malle, who was promoted from editor of vogue.com, though Wintour remains global chief content officer of Vogue internationally.

Wintour came under sustained criticism for backing the Met's decision to honour John Galliano with a Costume Institute retrospective, given his 2011 conviction by a French court for antisemitic and racist public insults; footage from the period showed him making statements about Jewish people that included praise for Adolf Hitler and references to gassing their families. Amid the backlash, Galliano withdrew from the exhibition and the Met confirmed that it would not proceed. Wintour said that she believed it was "the right decision" and gave Galliano and the museum her support.

=== Influence in fashion industry ===
Through the years, she has come to be regarded as one of the most powerful people in fashion, setting trends and anointing new designers. Industry publicists often heard "Do you want me to go to Anna with this?" when they had differences with her subordinates. The Guardian has called her the "unofficial mayoress" of New York City. She encouraged fashion houses such as Christian Dior to hire younger, fresher designers such as John Galliano. Her influence extended outside fashion. She persuaded Donald Trump to let Marc Jacobs use a ballroom at the Plaza Hotel for a show when Jacobs and his partner were short of cash. In 2006, she persuaded Brooks Brothers to hire the relatively unknown Thom Browne. A protégée at Vogue, Plum Sykes, became a successful novelist, drawing her settings from New York's fashionable élite.

Her salary was reported to be $2 million a year in 2005. In addition, she receives several perks, such as a chauffeured Mercedes-Benz S-Class (both in New York and abroad), a $200,000 shopping allowance, and the Coco Chanel Suite at the Hotel Ritz Paris while attending European fashion shows. Condé Nast president Samuel Irving Newhouse Jr. had the company make her an interest-free $1.6 million loan to purchase her townhouse in Greenwich Village.

== Charity work ==
Wintour serves as a trustee of the Metropolitan Museum of Art in New York, where she has organised benefits that have raised $50 million for the museum's Costume Institute. She began the CFDA/Vogue Fund in order to encourage, support and mentor unknown fashion designers. She has also raised over $10 million for AIDS charities since 1990, by organising various high-profile benefits.

== Personal life ==
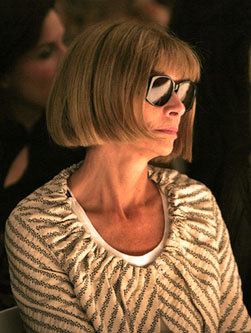
Wintour at a 2005 show

Wintour has been described as perfectionistic, emotionally distant, and hard to approach. She agrees she can "get quite angry".

=== Relationships ===
Wintour began dating well-connected older men during her teens. She was briefly involved with novelist Piers Paul Read when she was 15, and he was 24. In her later teens, she dated gossip columnist Nigel Dempster, and the two became a fixture on the London club circuit.

Wintour married child psychiatrist David Shaffer in 1984, and they had a son named Charles (born 1985) and a daughter named Katherine (born 1987) before divorcing in 1999. Charles is a graduate of the University of Oxford and Columbia College of Physicians and Surgeons. Katherine wrote occasional columns for The Daily Telegraph in 2006 and graduated from Columbia University in 2009, and is a New York-based producer with Ambassador Theatre Group. Katherine married Italian filmmaker Francesco Carrozzini, son of Vogue Italia editor-in-chief Franca Sozzani, in 2018.

Newspapers and gossip columnists alleged that Wintour's affair with investor Shelby Bryan ended her marriage to Shaffer. She declined to comment. A former colleague quoted in the Observer said that Bryan "mellowed her" and that she "smiles now and has been seen to laugh". It was reported in October 2020, that Wintour's marriage to Bryan had ended after 16 years.

=== Residence ===
Wintour lives in New York City's Greenwich Village.

=== Habits ===
When she was Vogue editor, Wintour said she woke up at 5:30 a.m., played tennis, got her hair and makeup done, and arrived at the Vogue offices at 7:30. She always turned up at fashion shows well before their scheduled start, stating, "I use the waiting time to make phone calls and notes; I get some of my best ideas at the shows." According to the BBC documentary series Boss Woman, she rarely stays at parties for more than 20 minutes at a time and usually goes to bed by 10:15 p.m. at the latest. She turns off her mobile phone so as not to be disturbed while eating her lunch, which is most often a steak or a hamburger without the bun. High-protein meals have been a habit of hers for a long time. A co-worker at Harpers & Queen said that she would eat "smoked salmon and scrambled eggs" every single day and that "she would eat nothing else".

=== Personal fashion ===
Because of her position, Wintour's wardrobe is often closely scrutinised and imitated. Earlier in her career, she mixed fashionable t-shirts and vests with designer jeans. When she started at Vogue as creative director, she switched to Chanel suits with miniskirts. She continued to wear them during both pregnancies, opening the skirts slightly in back and keeping her jacket on to cover up. Wintour was listed as "one of the 50 best-dressed over 50s" by The Guardian in March 2013. Aside from sporting Chanel suits with midiskirts, she has also been seen wearing kitten heels and printed midi-dresses.

According to biographer Jerry Oppenheimer, her ubiquitous sunglasses are actually corrective lenses, since she has deteriorating vision as her father did. A former colleague he interviewed recalls trying on her Wayfarers in her absence and getting dizzy. "I think at this point they've become, you know, really armour", Wintour herself told 60 Minutes correspondent Morley Safer, explaining that they allow her to keep her reactions to a show private. As she rebounded from the end of her marriage and the turnover in the magazine's editorial staff, a fellow editor and friend noted that "she's not hiding behind her glasses anymore. Now she's having fun again."

=== Politics ===
Wintour has supported the Democratic Party since Hillary Clinton's 2000 Senate run and John Kerry's 2004 presidential campaign. She also served as a "bundler" of contributions during Barack Obama's presidential campaigns in 2008 and 2012. She co-hosted fundraisers for Obama's campaigns with Sarah Jessica Parker, with one being a 50-person, $40,000-per-person dinner at Parker's West Village town house with Meryl Streep, Michael Kors, and advertising executive Trey Laird among the attendees. She also teamed with Calvin Klein and Harvey Weinstein on fundraisers during Obama's first term, with Donna Karan among the attendees.

In 2013, when Vogue's former director of communications stepped down, Wintour was rumoured to be looking to hire someone with a political background. Soon after, she hired Hildy Kuryk, who worked as a fundraiser for the Democratic National Committee and Obama's 2008 campaign. She supported Hillary Clinton's 2016 presidential campaign, forming part of Clinton's long list of wealthy donors and served as Clinton's consultant on wardrobe choices for key moments of the campaign. Wintour endorsed Joe Biden for the 2020 United States presidential election. She has written in favour of fur in Vogue, and has used fur in photo spreads. Her changes to Vogue have been described as advancing the status of women. She has defended the democratisation of what were once exclusive luxury brands, stating that it is good that "more people are going to get better fashion". An investigation in The New York Times indicated that black women had been sidelined at Vogue during her time there. Wintour apologised to staff for the magazine's complicity in racism.

== The Devil Wears Prada ==
Lauren Weisberger, a former Wintour assistant who left Vogue for Departures along with Richard Story, wrote the novel The Devil Wears Prada after a writing workshop he suggested she take. It was eagerly anticipated for its supposed insider portrait of Wintour prior to its publication. Wintour told The New York Times, "I always enjoy a great piece of fiction. I haven't decided whether I am going to read it or not." While it has been suggested that the fashion magazine setting and Miranda Priestly character were based on Vogue and Wintour, Weisberger claims she drew not only from her own experiences but those of her friends as well. Wintour herself makes a cameo appearance near the end of the book, where it is said she and Miranda dislike each other.

In the novel, Priestly has many similarities to Wintour—among them, she is British, has two children, and is described as a major contributor to the Met. Priestly is a tyrant who makes impossible demands of her subordinates, gives them almost none of the information or time necessary to comply and then berates them for their failures to do so.

Kate Betts, who had been fired by Harper's after two years during which staffers said she tried too hard to emulate Wintour, reviewed it harshly in The New York Times Book Review:

Having worked at Vogue myself for eight years and having been mentored by Anna Wintour, I have to say Weisberger could have learned a few things in the year she sold her soul to the devil of fashion for $32,500. She had a ringside seat at one of the great editorial franchises in a business that exerts an enormous influence over women, but she seems to have understood almost nothing about the isolation and pressure of the job her boss was doing, or what it might cost a person like Miranda Priestly to become a character like Miranda Priestly.

Priestly has some positive qualities. Andrea Sachs, the novel's main character, notes that she makes all the magazine's key editorial decisions by herself and that she has genuine class and style.

=== Film adaptation ===
During the production of The Devil Wears Prada in 2005, Wintour was reportedly threatening prominent fashion personalities, particularly designers, that Vogue would not cover them if they made cameo appearances in the film as themselves. She denied it through a spokesperson who said she was interested in anything that "supports fashion". Many designers are mentioned in the film. Only one, Valentino Garavani, appeared as himself.

The film was released in 2006 to great commercial success. Wintour attended the première wearing Prada. In the film, actress Meryl Streep plays Priestly different enough from the book to receive critical praise as an entirely original (and more sympathetic) character. Streep's office in the film was similar enough to Wintour's that Wintour reportedly had hers redecorated.

Wintour reportedly said the film would probably go straight-to-DVD. It made over $300 million in worldwide box-office receipts. Later in 2006, in an interview with Barbara Walters that aired the day of the DVD's release, Wintour said she found the film "really entertaining" and praised it for making fashion "entertaining and glamorous and interesting … I was 100 percent behind it."

That opinion of the film has not yet led her to forgive Weisberger. When it was reported that the novelist's editor told her to start her third novel over, Wintour's spokesman suggested she "should get a job as someone else's assistant."

Oppenheimer suggests The Devil Wears Prada may have done Wintour a favour by increasing her name recognition. "Besides giving Weisberger her fifteen minutes", he says, "[it] … place[d] Anna squarely in the mainstream celebrity pantheon. [She] was now known and talked about over Big Macs and french fries under the Golden Arches by young fashionistas in Wal-Mart denim in Davenport and Dubuque."

When The September Issue was released three years later, critics compared it with the earlier, fictional film. "For the past year or so, she's been on the media warpath to win back her image", said Paul Schrodt in Slant Magazine. Many considered the question of how similar she was to Streep's Priestly, and praised the film for showing the real person. Manohla Dargis at The New York Times said that Priestly had helped humanise Wintour, and "the documentary continues this". "The movie offers insights that lift it beyond a realist version of The Devil Wears Prada", agreed Mary Pols in Time. Wintour herself has since embraced the film, most notably appearing on the cover of Vogue alongside Streep as part of the promotion for its 2026 sequel.

The film version of the Weisberger novel (screenplay penned by Aline Brosh McKenna) has not been the only film to have a character borrowing some aspects of Wintour. Edna Mode's similar hairstyle in The Incredibles (2004) has been noted. Johnny Depp said he partially based the demeanour of Willy Wonka in Charlie and the Chocolate Factory (2005) on Wintour. Fey Sommers in Ugly Betty (2006–2010) was also likened to Wintour, from the trademark bob and sunglasses, to Wintour's last name homophonous with 'Winter', while ' Sommers' is homophonous with 'Summer'.

== See also ==
- New Yorkers in journalism
- Vogue World 2024

== Works cited ==
- Cutler, R.J. (director) (2009). The September Issue (Motion picture). Roadside Attractions.
- Gray, Kevin (13 September 1999). "The Summer of Her Discontent". New York.
- Horyn, Cathy (1 February 2007). "Citizen Anna". The New York Times. Retrieved 2 February 2007.
- Oppenheimer, Jerry (2005). Front Row: The Cool Life and Hot Times of Vogue's Editor In Chief. St. Martin's Press, New York. ISBN 0-312-32310-7.
- Safer, Morley (17 May 2009). "Anna Wintour, Behind the Shades". 60 Minutes. CBS News.
- Weisberger, Lauren (2003). The Devil Wears Prada. Broadway Books, New York. ISBN 0-7679-1476-7.

Media offices
Preceded by Beatrix Miller	Editor of British Vogue; 1985–1987	Succeeded by Liz Tilberis
Preceded by Grace Mirabella	Editor of American Vogue; 1988–2025	Succeeded by Chloe Malle
