= Sheilagh Brown =

British fashion designer

- Born: Kent
- Occupations: Fashion designer; fashion academic
- Notable credit: Senior Fellow of the Royal College of Art

Sheilagh Brown is a British fashion designer who began her career in the 1960s, as part of the Swinging London scene. She was among the designers for Stirling Cooper, working subsequently at Coopers and Quorum, before establishing the label Barnett and Brown with Sheridan Barnett.

She continued to design under her own name, both high-end fashion and for the high-street, as part of a collaboration with Jeffrey Rogers. At the end of the 1980s, Brown became head of womenswear design at Marks & Spencer. She remained in this role for more than a decade.

She also worked as a fashion academic, first at Central Saint Martins and later at the Royal College of Art, where she was appointed a senior fellow in 2011.

== Early life and career ==
Sheilagh Brown was born in Kent and her father was a photographer for the Natural History Museum. She had her first foray into fashion working in a shoe shop in Rayners Lane. She attended Harrow Art School where, as she recalled in an interview for Very magazine, she learned many skills including running up a frock in a couple of hours to wear for the evening's clubbing in Soho. She knew the young Malcolm McLaren – then Malcolm Edwards – as well as Ronnie Wood. From art school, Brown won a place at the Royal College of Art – hers was one of 12 places on the course; her peer group included Bill Gibb and her tutors included Janey Ironside. While still a student, Brown earned money creating fashion drawings for national publications, including The Times, The Observer, Petticoat and 19. One of the perks of this job, as described by Brown in Very magazine, was that the clothes would arrive on a Friday night and Brown and her friends would wear them to a party before she stayed up all night to sketch and then return them.

=== Stirling Cooper ===
Antony Price – who was in the year above Brown – introduced her to Jeff Cooper, co-founder of the Stirling Cooper label. She joined as a womenswear designer, succeeding Jane Whiteside, while Price was in charge of menswear. At this stage, this was among the hippest brands in London and with an extraordinary boutique in Wigmore Street described in colourful detail by The Times' fashion editor Prudence Glynn in 1969: "Ingress, or rather descent, is through the jaws of a dragon and you expect to find yourself in a salon with a digestive tract decor. In fact, once you have been swallowed by Geoffrey Vivas' smiling monster the style is Japanese bath house." This was a place where rock stars, including Mick Jagger hung out. The shop was a testing ground for new ideas and was described by The Times journalist Anthony King-Deacon as effectively a couture house, the key differences being the ready-to-wear designs, the limited choice of sizes and the low prices. Turnaround on designs was rapid – as little as two weeks – and men's and women's clothes were made up in the same factory and in similar materials to reduce costs.

=== Coopers and Quorum ===
When the Stirling Cooper partnership split, Brown moved on with Jeff Cooper and Sheridan Barnett to found Coopers, a high-fashion brand located just off Savile Row. This had its own store, but also retailed through stores such as Miss Selfridge. Two years later, Brown and Barnett took over from Alice Pollock and Ossie Clark as head designers at Quorum. Describing the atmosphere, Brown has said: "It was every designer's dream job. It was insane, with Alice working on her collection, stark naked on hot days. Crazed models drifted into my studio and drank my cloudy paint water!"

== Barnett and Brown ==
In 1976, Barnett and Brown set up in business together in Macklin Street, Covent Garden, in a space loaned rent free by Jeff Banks. Brown also set up a design studio co-op for graduate designers called Queen Street Studios, which was located above Blitz Club.

Writing in 1977, Prudence Glynn singled out Barnett and Brown – then producing their second collection under the Jazz label – as: "designers whose recent collections bear traces of the eighteenth-century influence". Glynn said their collection had avoided descending into fancy dress and had: "attempted to convey a mood of elegance and luxury. The result is entirely original and illustrates the move towards rich fabrics and softness of colour and cut". The article featured designs by Brown, including a wraparound coat in mohair and jodhpurs with matching top with a ruff collar made of pink moire.

Glynn included Brown and Barnett in a televised fashion show she organised at Castle Howard in November 1978 (this was shown on Yorkshire Television and later written up in The Times), including them as representative of: "a very specific look which is specially associated with young English fashion". Conceived as a showcase of British fashion talent, the programme also included designs by Norman Hartnell, Zandra Rhodes, Murray Arbeid, Janice Wainwright and Kaffe Fasset.

=== Fashion lecturer and high-street ranges ===
By 1980, Barnett and Brown had split, a casualty of the early 1980s recession. Speaking in 1983 about the business failure, Barnett said: "Even the New York orders were unreal. But we did not have the finance to produce the orders. We tried everywhere, but that was the start of the recession, that was when it was really starting to bite on the fashion industry". The duo both took teaching jobs at Central Saint Martins and then Barnett began designing under his own name for the Salvador label owned by Eric Hall. By 1983, he had picked up a Dress of the Year award.

Sheilagh Brown stayed on as principal lecturer in fashion at Saint Martins. The college at this time was, as she described it, a "hothouse atmosphere", with a whole raft of students who would go on to influence fashion and popular culture, including John Galliano, John Flett, Stephen Jones, Darla Jane Gilroy, Sade and Chris Sullivan. She began a project with the fashion designer Jeffrey Rogers – a key supplier of mass market fashion (usually under an eponymous label) to retailers such as Top Shop and Miss Selfridge. This gave students the opportunity to design garments for commercial production. This, as described by Rogers, was an abysmal failure, but he liked working with Brown and invited her to design for him.

Brown's own label designs for Jeffrey Rogers proved so successful that she began designing for its more upmarket Portrait label as well. Brown noted that this was a very different way of working, not least because store buyers had more control over the overall styling and merchandising of garments once they arrived in store, adding: "The discipline of working within a strict budget is surprisingly exhilarating". Brown also maintained her own more upmarket label, with outfits costing upwards of £200, but Brenda Polan said this was a bonus. "Jeffrey Rogers's masterstroke is that he has made the connection between designer and mass market less tenuous". In 1984, Brown's designs were exhibited at a British fashion event held at Olympia for international fashion buyers – described as a "coming of age" for the fashion industry – since all the ready-to-wear designers were under one roof and exhibited so that buyers and journalists could see their work. Others exhibiting included BodyMap, Wendy Dagworthy, Betty Jackson, Roland Klein and Sheridan Barnett.

== Marks & Spencer design role ==
In 1988, (some sources say 1990), Brown became head of womenswear design at Marks & Spencer. Writing in The Guardian, Catherine Wilson said the credit for a turnaround in M&S profits (at record levels in 1993) was with Brown, who had brought in a team of six designers and was using Betty Jackson and Paul Smith as consultants. Marks & Spencer picked up a British Fashion Award in 1995. Brown retired from the role in 2001.

== Fashion influence ==
Brown taught many of the next generation of fashion designers during her tenure at Central Saint Martins and later at the Royal College of Art, where she was made a senior fellow in 2011. At Central Saint Martins, this included names such as John Galliano and John Flett, both of whom are credited with pioneering a new form of bias-cutting. At the RCA, this included names such as the milliner Philip Treacy – Treacy mentioned her as one of his most influential teachers and said she helped him make the decision to become a milliner rather than a fashion designer.

Brown's involvement in shaping high fashion's move from elite couture into edgy styles for mass manufacturing – notably with Stirling Cooper – was profiled in an interview for the Design Museum's 2009 exhibition Super Contemporary. Her eponymous designs with Sheridan Barnett are included within the archive of the Victoria and Albert Museum.
