= The Chelsea Cobbler =

British shoe brand

- Industry: Shoe manufacturer and retailer
- Founded: 1967; 59 years ago
- Founder: Richard Smith, Amanda Wilkins, George Macfarlane
- Headquarters: London, England

The Chelsea Cobbler (also sometimes Chelsea Cobbler) is a British shoe brand that was established in the 1960s in Chelsea.

Originally a high-fashion brand creating bespoke (made-to-measure) shoes, it was regularly featured in catwalk shows and the fashion press throughout the 1970s, when it also had a retail presence in New York City. It was twice chosen as part of the Dress of the Year ensemble displayed at the Fashion Museum, Bath. Later the brand was absorbed into larger fashion companies. It was relaunched in 2009.

== Brand establishment ==
The Chelsea Cobbler's first store opened in April 1967 in Draycott Avenue, Chelsea. The founders were Richard Smith (also the shoe designer), Amanda Wilkins and George Macfarlane. Writing in The Times in 1968, Antony King-Deacon said the brand's shoes cost from 9 guineas and the founders were: "trying to get the public to accept well-made, rather expensive shoes". King-Deacon's comments were within an article bemoaning the poor quality of mass shoe production and describing the re-emergence of small and bespoke designers. This was in an era when the UK shoe market was dominated by lower-priced brands within the British Shoe Corporation; its stores accounted for an estimated 25 to 30 per cent of retail shoe sales in the UK at the end of the 1960s. The factory which was in Mornington Crescent was run by Spiros Mina and Antony Achilleos. Arty Achilleos was an apprentice here. He later started his own business Baboucha.

A year later, Prudence Glynn featured The Chelsea Cobbler, alongside Rayne, Moya Bowler, Ravel and Magli in an article about London's best specialist shoe shops. By this stage, the brand also had a shoe shop in Sackville Street in the West End. Also in 1969, Richard Smith of Chelsea Cobbler and Glen Carr of Norvic were chosen to show off the versatility of a new leather substitute created by British company Chloride Electrical Storage Company and known as Porvair. Smith's shoes were worn with men's clothing created by hip womenswear designer Clive Evans at the launch event.

In 1969, Mirabel Walker described it as among a crop of new shoe design companies that had caught up with continental Europe's design approach, saying: "The Chelsea Cobbler...make shoes in any colour, any style, to suit any foot".

== 1970s expansion ==
In 1970, The Chelsea Cobbler was chosen as part of the Dress of the Year ensemble. Its blue suede boots were worn in combination with a Bill Gibb plaid maxi skirt and a waistcoat by Kaffe Fassett. The outfit's selector was Vogue editor Beatrix Miller. Also in 1970, The Times featured its novelty canvas boots supplied with iron-on transfers, enabling people to customise their footwear by decorating the canvas in acrylic paints. The boots were priced at 12 guineas a pair. By this stage, as Prudence Glynn reported, fashionable shoppers were in the grip of boot "fever": "The British, of course, love queueing and the new generation of standers in line can be seen any day in The Chelsea Cobbler or Annello and Davide preparing to wait eight to 12 weeks for a pair of boots to be made. The boot fever is such that even the Parisiennes must wait because stocks sell as fast as they are delivered".

In 1971, the company was among the accessories designers featured in an exhibition showcasing British talent at The Louvre – at the invitation of the director of Musée des Arts Décoratifs – entitled L'Idee de la Forme. Fashion designers in the mix included Christopher McDonnell, Barbara Hulanicki, Mary Quant, Jean Muir, Bill Gibb and Beatrice Bellini. That year, the company was also producing boots – wide-legged and in quilted suede with wooden heel and platform – for main branches of Russell & Bromley. In 1972, a branch opened in New York City.

By 1973, The Chelsea Cobbler had its own department within Harrods' 'Way In' fashion department. Prudence Glynn reported that the leather company Barrow Hepburn had taken a controlling interest, saying: "I approve of Barrow Hepburn's controlling interest in Chelsea Cobbler. Richard Smith, who heads the latter, has very sensitive antennae and a very sure style. With Manolo Blahnik of Zapata, he shares the favours to top fashion designers in this country who use his shoes to complement their clothes". Two years later, The Chelsea Cobbler was once again chosen as part of the Dress of the Year ensemble, this time for a pair of men's shoes worn with a Tommy Nutter suit and chosen by the editor of the UK edition of Brides.

In 1976, it was reported that Richard Smith would be creating a shoe design for Rayne. By 1978, The Chelsea Cobbler had branches in New Bond Street, Fulham Road and King's Road, as well as concessions in Harrods and Bentalls in Kingston.

In 1979, Rayne acquired The Chelsea Cobbler business from Barrow Hepburn for £150,000.

== Later history ==
In 1993, both The Chelsea Cobbler brand and Rayne were absorbed into Nine West, an American shoe company that would later buy Pied a Terre. By 2004, the brand was part of Shoe Studio Group. By 2008, it was under the ownership of Baugur Group. In 2009, Shoe Studio Group assets were sold to the footwear brand Dune Group.

Chelsea Cobbler was relaunched as a menswear brand by Dune in 2009. Standalone stores were opened in South Molton Street and Fenwick in Brent Cross Shopping Centre. In 2012, a Chelsea Cobbler men's shoes concession opened within Topman Oxford Circus. These stores however were closed by Dune.
