= Antony Price =

English fashion designer (1945–2025)

- Born: 5 March 1945; Keighley, Yorkshire, England
- Died: 16 December 2025 (aged 80)
- Education: Bradford School of Art; Royal College of Art
- Occupation: Fashion designer
- Known for: Evening wear; suits; melding fashion with rock
- Label: Antony Price
- Awards: Evening Glamour Award (British Fashion Awards)

Antony Price (5 March 1945 – 16 December 2025) was an English fashion designer best known for evening wear and suits, and for being as much an "image-maker" as a designer.

Price collaborated with musicians, including Duran Duran, David Bowie, Robert Palmer, Iva Davies, Steve Strange, but especially with Bryan Ferry and Roxy Music, whose looks were defined by Price's designs. The manner in which Price dressed – or in many cases, undressed – the "Roxy girls" on the covers of their albums helped define the band's pop retrofuturism.

He was later noted for dressing celebrities such as Tara Palmer-Tomkinson, Patsy Kensit, Anjelica Huston, Jerry Hall, Camilla Parker Bowles, Diana Ross, Melanie Griffith, Yasmin Le Bon and burlesque performer Dita Von Teese.

== Background ==
Price was born in Keighley in Yorkshire on 5 March 1945. He grew up in Selside in the Yorkshire Dales National Park, later moving to Oxenhope. He was educated at Eshton Hall School for Boys in Gargrave, Yorkshire. In 1961, at the age of 16, he gained entrance to the Bradford School of Art (now the Bradford School of Arts and Media Studies), completing a one-year General Art and Design course, followed by specialising for three years in womenswear fashion. In 1965, he entered the Royal College of Art's Fashion School in London where he completed a three-year – two years in womenswear fashion and the final year and degree show in menswear fashion – course. Price credited his time at the Bradford School as invaluable in preparing him for the Royal College, saying: "I arrived at the Royal College of Art with a total headstart and was able to whip my own show together."

Price died on 16 December 2025, at the age of 80.

== Career ==
=== Early career ===
In 1968, Directly out of college, Price began working for the new Stirling Cooper shop, designing men's trousers, coats and waistcoats which drew on sexual fetishism for their impact. Stirling Cooper was situated in London's Wigmore Street, and had a noted oriental interior designed by Price and Jane Whiteside. With Juliet Mann, Price also designed the next shop he designed for, from 1969–1974, Che Guevara on Kensington High Street. Prudence Glynn, fashion editor for The Times tipped him as a major new fashion talent in "Trendsetters", giving him the main picture and writing that Price "is a sensational cutter and he puts a lot of work and thought into the shaping of even the most casual clothes. His range of little bare tops in crepe and cotton, for example, are technical feats, for they all have bra sections cut into the pattern ... he is undoubtedly a trendsetter and in advance of his time ... his clothes have great wit and gaiety and he is certainly a name to be watched in the future". He next designed for Plaza, and then, in 1979, started his own label, with shops in South Molton Street and on the King's Road. He also operated a shop called "Ebony" in the 1980s.

Price's button trousers for Stirling Cooper were worn by Mick Jagger for The Rolling Stones' 1969 American Gimme Shelter Tour. In addition, his bridge-crutch trousers were feat of technical skill, inventing a new construction that highlighted the male crotch and buttocks. He was the stylist for Roxy Music's first eight albums, as well as for the back cover for Lou Reed's 1972 Transformer album. His self-declared trademark design is a spiral-zipped dress in ciré satin, first seen worn by Amanda Lear in Nova's cover story for its May 1970 issue, "How To Undress for Your Husband" and later featured as one of "Princess Zonda's archetypal outfits" in the advertisements Price drew himself for Plaza in the late seventies. The Lear pictures appeared in Peter York's feature on Price in Harper's and Queen's April 1979 issue. Lear was also the Price-dressed cover girl for Roxy Music's 1973 album For Your Pleasure.

In 1982, Price collaborated with the British band Duran Duran, designing electric silk tonic suits for the "Rio" video.

In 1983, Price staged a "Fashion Extravaganza" at the London's Camden Palace.

A year later, in 1984, Price staged another "Fashion Extravaganza" at the London's Hippodrome, combining fashion and rock music. "I'm partly responsible for the marriage of rock and fashion," Price said in 1998, "When I started out, rock people thought fashion people were snobby and fashion people thought the music industry was grubby and dirty." Stylist David Thomas says about Price's influence:

He reinvented the suit so that it was no longer about going to the office. He made it rock'n'roll. He started at a time when British fashion didn't have sponsors. It was the era before the superstar designer. They all came after him. Yet he was a visionary. He created that military, dandy, sexy, eclectic men's look. He created rock'n'roll fashion.

Price declared that "I'm not a fashion designer ... I'm in the theatrical business," and for Fashion Aid at Albert Hall in 1985, he conceived of a presentation of model, client and long-standing friend Jerry Hall emerging from a black velvet box. The outfit consisted of a bolero and dress with lampshade peplum in metallic and red French silk lace over lamé. Price said of this outfit: "It wasn't the chicest or most subtle garment, but when Jerry moved under the lights she looked like a Siamese fighting fish in a vast blue tank."

Price received the Evening Glamour Award from the British Fashion Council in 1989, and the following year British Vogue published a profile on Price written by Sarah Mower. He described his approach to designing women's clothing in an interview in 1994:

My clothes are men's idea of what women should wear, and for that they'll pay good money. ... Men are looking for the sex robot from Lang's Metropolis with the perfect body offering endless fantasy sex. They're obsessed by the size of sexual protuberances – their own as well as women's – and I'm an illusionist. My job is to give them what they want.

=== Later career ===
Price was widely considered to be a frontrunner in the search to replace Gianni Versace in 1998, after that designer's untimely death.

In 2000, Price opened his own showroom again in Chelsea, London under the financial backing and Directorship of Dean Aslett, who had previously worked with Price in the late 1980s at the Nick Rhodes-backed Antony Price Boutique in Brook Street, Mayfair. Price also created evening gowns constructed of carpet to feature in the advertising campaigns of British carpet manufacturer Brintons, a commission previously undertaken by Vivienne Westwood. In 2000, he created clothing for Glenalmond Tweed, along with 25 other British designers including Westwood, Alexander McQueen and Margaret Howell, and in 2003, he was among a number of British designers who created gowns for Pamela Anderson when she hosted the British Fashion Awards that year.

He was nominated for the British Fashion Council's Red Carpet Designer Award at the 2006 British Fashion Awards, and a small range of his clothes sell in London boutique A La Mode. He was featured in the fashion magazines Pop and Butt in spring 2005. In December 2006, Price was photographed by David Bailey for British Vogue alongside Christopher Kane. Price worked with Daphne Guinness in developing a range of key shirt and tailoring designs for her eponymous clothing line, which is currently sold in London's Dover Street Market. He also launched a line of menswear for Topman in November 2008.

Price continued to design clothing, with the Duchess of Cornwall among the customers. In May 2012, he dressed actress Tilda Swinton for her appearance in drag for the cover of Candy magazine, described as "the first fashion magazine completely dedicated to celebrating transvestism, transsexuality, crossdressing and androgyny in all their glory." In 2013, Price resumed his association with Steve Strange (whom previously he had designed outfits for during the Visage – The Anvil period in 1982) and designed an outfit for the relaunch of Steve Strange's Visage project, which he wore for the David Bowie V&A Exhibition Private View Gala Night.

== See also ==
- Glam rock
