= BodyMap =

British fashion label of the 1980s

- Company type: Private company
- Traded as: BodyMap
- Industry: Fashion
- Founded: London, England (1982)
- Founder: David Holah, Stevie Stewart
- Defunct: 1990s
- Headquarters: London, England

BodyMap (also sometimes written as Bodymap or Body Map) was an influential British fashion label of the 1980s, renowned for its layered and innovatively structured shapes, distinctive prints and groundbreaking fashion shows.

During the post-Punk and New Romantic early to mid '80s, when street and club styles dominated the British fashion scene, BodyMap was described by the Chicago Tribune as: "perhaps the hottest, most visually arresting company in Britain's design renaissance".

In 1986, Suzy Menkes noted in The Times that although some of its designs were too extreme to sell well, it was highly influential: "[Bodymap's] ideas on body conscious dressing were freely taken up and absorbed into mainstream fashion".

In a 2010 retrospective in Dazed Digital, Al Mulhall said it remains: "a reference point in the world of ready-to-wear".

== History ==
BodyMap was founded by Stevie Stewart and David Holah in 1982, both fashion graduates of Middlesex Polytechnic. Originally launched from a stall on Camden Market while they were students, it generated publicity quickly – helped by the fact that Stewart and Holah's graduation collection was bought by the prestigious independent South Molton Street fashion store Browns.

In an interview for the V&A, Stewart and Holah also credit Swiss-born event producer Susanne Bartsch for their swift rise. After BodyMap was shown at a 'New London in New York' show designed to introduce young British design talent to American audiences, and garnered substantial publicity from the U.S. fashion press, it then attracted interest from the UK press. David Holah commented in the V&A interview that, after the New York show, they became: "stars overnight".

In common with other emerging designers of the 1980s, Stewart and Holah were strongly influenced by London's club scene and designed specifically for young people. BodyMap's early collaboration with textile designer Hilde Smith saw it use distinctive prints that were as much a part of its trademark look as the use of multiple layering and lines that were designed to remap the body's outline. Choice of fabrics was also key to the look – in a 2013 interview, David Holah said: "We worked closely with a sportswear company in Sweden and experimented with high quality cotton and viscose fabrics...we pioneered viscose lycra".

In 1984, BodyMap's place as one of London's most innovative fashion houses seemed assured when it won the Dress of the Year award with an outfit selected by Brenda Polan of The Guardian.

=== Catwalk shows ===
One of BodyMap's most distinctive (and publicity generating) elements was its catwalk shows, which included outfit changes on the side of the runway in view of the audience and the designers' mothers acting as models. The 1985 show for Barbie Takes a Trip Around Nature's Cosmic Curves – featuring cross-dressing models of all ages and sizes, latex wigs and exposed flesh – was reported to have left American buyers shocked. A contemporaneous U.S. newspaper report of a BodyMap fashion show in 1985 concluded that: "Some perceived in it a vaguely perverted tone that, although not downright sado-masochistic, was definitely kinky".

The excitement surrounding its shows was added to by the celebrities who appeared on the catwalk, including Boy George, Helen Terry, Marilyn, Leigh Bowery and Michael Clark. Stewart and Holah were to reciprocate by designing costumes for Clark's 1986 ballet No Fire Escape in Hell. A 1984 review in The New York Times said the atmosphere at the catwalk show was: "as bizarre as any rock star's video", also noting that the arrival of Boy George and Marilyn caused a similar stir in London to Princess Caroline of Monaco arriving at Dior in Paris.

The label's publicity imagery was largely generated in-house and BodyMap collaborated with up-and-coming photographers, notably Mario Testino and David LaChapelle.

=== Expansion ===
Bodymap's B-basic (diffusion) line helped to make the range more widely affordable. By 1985, it had expanded into men's and women's collections, Red Label, a B line of childrenswear and swimwear. Unable to expand the brand and attract enough financial backers, the company had begun to struggle by 1986. That year, it was reported in The Times that it had gone into liquidation, despite international acclaim and substantial orders on its books. Its last fashion show was in March that year. It continued to sell its B-basic line via the stall on Camden Market into the '90s. Most accounts place the brand's demise around 1991, although it still had a loyal following and talk of a revival – with licensing in Japan and a range for Ministry of Sound – continued for another few years.

== Later careers ==
Stevie Stewart moved on to design costumes for stars such as Britney Spears, Kylie Minogue and Girls Aloud, also continuing her association with Michael Clark's ballet company and other dance companies. She and David Holah still collaborate on projects, although he focuses on his art practice and teaching in the areas of fashion and print.

== Popular culture and retrospectives ==
In 2011, BodyMap outfits featured in a 'Cavalcade of the 80s' fashion show curated by Sue Tilley (muse to Lucian Freud and friend of Leigh Bowery), organised by Wayne Hemingway and Gerardine Hemingway at London's Southbank Centre. In an Absolutely Fabulous reunion episode that aired on 1 January 2012, Edina (Jennifer Saunders) wore an outfit featuring oversized BodyMap logos on the T-shirt.

BodyMap was an integral part of a major V&A exhibition, From Club to Catwalk, in 2013, with the main publicity material featuring a photograph of model Scarlett Cannon in a BodyMap outfit from the label's The Cat in the Hat Takes a Rumble with a Techno Fish collection. A supporting video showed catwalk footage and photographs and featured an interview with Stewart and Holah about the rise of BodyMap. Other 1980s fashion names included in the exhibition included Workers for Freedom, Betty Jackson and Katharine Hamnett.

In 2013, BodyMap also featured in the ICA's launch events for Iain R. Webb's book on 1980s style and culture We're Not Here To Sell Clothes: The Making of BLITZ Fashion, with Holah and Stewart appearing in a panel discussion.

== Awards ==
- Martini Young Fashion Award (1983)
- Bath Museum of Costume Dress of the Year Award (1984)

== External sources ==
- Interview with Stewart and Holah and footage from catwalk shows on V&A channel, 2013
- BodyMap fashion at Style Bubble, 2007
- David Holah website, including BodyMap archive images
- Sue Tilley fashion show on Flickr featuring BodyMap outfits, top left and top right
- Punk Body Map Rock, 1986, on YouTube, attributed to John Maybury
- Spring Summer London show, 1990, on YouTube Fashion Channel
