= Workers for Freedom =

British fashion label

- Industry: Fashion
- Founded: 1985
- Founder: Graham Fraser and Richard Nott
- Headquarters: London, England

Workers for Freedom was a British fashion label that was launched in 1985 by Graham Fraser and Richard Nott. The brand was awarded Designer of the Year in 1989 at the British Fashion Awards.

The brand look was described by the LA Times as: "rich-hippie intellectual clothes". The Glasgow Herald, on the other hand, summarised it as: "a stylishness based on subtlety and fine construction which stands remote from fashion's general glitzkrieg and the obstructive shoulder pad".

Workers for Freedom's design signatures included flowing shapes and ethnic-inspired details. It was particularly known for appliqué (widely copied on the high street) and intricate tie fastenings on garments such as shirts. Initially, its range was aimed at men but it soon expanded to womenswear. Some of its strongest early sales were with buyers from the United States, Italy and Japan – it had over 30 overseas clients by 1987.

In the wake of its British Designer of the Year award, The Guardian noted that the label had: "built a reputation for wearable, beautifully made clothes always incorporating something surprising".

== Establishment of the label ==
Graham Fraser and Richard Nott founded Workers for Freedom in 1985; the name sounded radical but they said it was chosen because they hoped it would give them the freedom to work for themselves. Describing the inspiration for the name in 1987, Fraser said it was about: "artistic and financial freedom to develop without the restraints imposed by big business".

The duo were in their 30s when they established the brand, and with substantial fashion industry experience. Richard Nott had been a fashion lecturer at Kingston Polytechnic, before which he worked for Valentino in Italy. Graham Fraser, meanwhile, had worked for a variety of fashion retailers, including the boutique Feathers, culminating in a merchandising role at Liberty where he was handling a budget of £10m.

Both had, at one time, worked with the leading 1970s designer Christopher McDonnell – Fraser was in a business partnership with him at Marrian-McDonnell for a short period while Nott spent a nine-month spell as assistant. Indeed, The Times fashion editor Prudence Glynn tipped Nott for the top in 1972, describing him as: "an exceptionally promising new design talent" and noting that his graduation show had attracted considerable interest from Marc Bohan at Dior.

Fraser and Nott were partners in their private and professional lives; in a feature about successful fashion couples – also featuring the husband and wife behind Clements Ribeiro – The Guardian said the pair had been a couple for a decade before finally deciding to work together on their own brand.

A 1990 profile, by which time Fraser was 41 and Nott 42, gave a bit more detail about their industry experience. Fraser had trained as an accountant and worked at both high-end and mass market retailers – with stints as a buyer for Harrods and Wallis – before joining Liberty. Nott had trained at Kingston Polytechnic before working in Italy and then moving into academia back at Kingston. A loan of £15,000 from a bank had enabled them to set up a small company – initially producing men's shirts and sweaters – before the label expanded into womenswear. They also had a private financial backer and the label was founded with hands-on assistance from ex-Calvin Klein staffer Sarah Mayhew-Coomber and her husband Stephen.

The brand's store was at 4/4a Lower John Street, Soho. It comprised just 280sq ft of selling space. Their first catwalk show took place in March 1987.

=== Early design hallmarks ===
Early ranges that came to the attention of the national press included tasselled waistcoats, peasant-style skirts, chunky jumpers and cardigans and fringed woollen shawls worn with deep-crowned felt hats. Describing their global inspirations, The Times wrote: "They started with middle-European cowboys, travelled through Mediterranean ports and Bavarian hunting lodges and are about to wade through a Mississippi swamp. This may sound like an excerpt from an Indiana Jones movie but is, in fact, a run through the themes Workers for Freedom, the London designers, have used for their collections and shop decor since they opened in October 1985. Noting that the label's biggest seller in autumn/winter 1986 was a double-layer chiffon skirt and the current season's reprise of this concept was a shirtwaister in chiffon and lace, the article said that the label had proved that: "young fashion need not be outrageous, unflattering or unaffordable". It also said that Fraser and Nott had, thus far, avoided PR launches and other attention-grabbing tactics only to find themselves at the centre of media interest.

== International expansion ==
The excitement surrounding the brand was international. By 1987, Workers for Freedom was opening a store within Bergdorf Goodman in New York, set to feature a mural of the Mississippi on the walls and with an opening party to be attended by Cher and Tatum O'Neal. At this stage, the brand was stocked in Browns in London, a designer store in Beauchamp Place and Glasgow boutique Ichi ni San, with over 30 overseas accounts mainly in Japan, Italy and the US. The following year, Workers for Freedom featured at Harrods as part of a promotion of British design for London Fashion Week, alongside names such as John Galliano, Jasper Conran and Paul Costelloe.

By 1988, it was reported that Workers for Freedom's garments were being made in Japan. By 1989, the company had a lower-priced diffusion range called White that featured some of its higher-end best-sellers.

=== Designer of the Year Award ===
The Times tipped three names for the Designer of the Year Award less than a month ahead of the British Fashion Awards – Workers for Freedom, the previous year's winner Rifat Ozbek and rising star Joe Casely-Hayford. Workers for Freedom picked up the prize, which was presented by Princess Diana, Summarising the brand's appeal, The Times said it had: "romantic folkloric style that remains in essence very British". In the succeeding fashion season, Workers for Freedom experienced an upturn in orders and interest, with Graham Nott saying: "You gain a little bit of confidence".

Workers for Freedom's spring 1990 showing featured more styles in this feminine vein, including: "flounced skirts, ribbon-trimmed jackets and shirts in suede as well as wool". However, there were fewer buyers in London due to retailing problems worldwide. Katharine Hamnett and John Galliano had chosen to show in Paris, while Rifat Ozbek screened a video rather than a holding a full catwalk show.

== Later years ==
In 1990, Fraser and Nott signed a marketing agreement with Marco Rivetti's Gruppo Finanziario Tessile (GFT), the Italian company that had promoted names such as Armani, Montana, Ungaro and Valentino to international audiences during the 1970s. Under the terms of the deal, Workers for Freedom would be promoted across North America by GFT. It was also reported that Workers for Freedom had produced another 10 tiger-print silk shirts for Paul McCartney's world tour (to add to the 40 or 50 in his collection) and it had some copyright cases to pursue, with The Times noting that: "The pirating of Worker's [sic] stylish appliquė shirts has become an industry sport".

By this stage, the company's clients included Diana Ross, Duran Duran and Vanessa Redgrave. Doris Saatchi, it was reported, ordered their silk robes in multiples. Fraser and Nott ended their Designer of the Year reign with a fashion show at Dayton Hudson in Minneapolis, where they showed alongside Yohji Yamamoto, Jean-Paul Gaultier and Geoffrey Beene. Fashion editor Liz Smith said the brand's signatures such as embroidery and appliqué were what attracted American store buyers, adding: "Here are two designers who ignore the trend towards high hemlines and go on doing their own thing".

In 1991, it was reported that continued financial pressure – worldwide recession, poor exchange rates and the Gulf War – had cut the budget of many high-spending foreign buyers who traditionally headed for London Fashion Week and Workers for Freedom, Jasper Conran and Bruce Oldfield were among those who chose not to stage a traditional catwalk show that spring – the official line to the press being that this was a curb on "unnecessary hype", rather than an economy.

In 1994, Fraser and Nott took a break from the business, returning to designing two years later after securing a new backer. In 1998, Fraser and Nott sold Workers for Freedom, taking on the tenancy of the National Trust property Stoneacre in Kent. Fraser had begun a garden design course and Nott was focusing on his painting. Nott had a solo exhibitions at the Rebecca Hossack Gallery in London in November 2018, titled Tidying Up.

=== Legacy ===
Workers for Freedom clothes are in several archives, including the Metropolitan Museum of Art and the Victoria and Albert Museum. In 2013, Workers for Freedom – along with BodyMap, Katharine Hamnett and Betty Jackson – featured in the V&A's From Club to Catwalk exhibition, which charted the influence of street styles on British high fashion.
