= John Flett (fashion designer) =

British fashion designer

- John Flett in 1988 photographed for Blitz magazine by Brad Branson and Fritz Kok
- Born: 28 September 1963; Brighton, United Kingdom
- Died: 19 January 1991 (aged 27); Florence, Italy
- Occupation: Fashion designer

John Flett (28 September 1963 – 19 January 1991) was a British fashion designer who achieved early success with his own brand before designing briefly for Claude Montana. He died of a heart attack at the age of 27, while working in Florence.

Sue Chowles, who had a work placement with Flett before working in fashion and later as a fashion academic, has said: "He would have been more influential than Galliano now...he was the most inspirational pattern cutter, a true genius". The Independent included John Flett at number 17 in an article about 50 great British fashion moments, saying: "Flett's last collection in London was exquisite, watery, shimmery and full of ideas".

== Early life ==
John Flett was from a Jewish background, according to his friend and former "soulmate" John Galliano, who has described Flett as "the love of his life". After studying fashion and textiles at West Sussex College of Design, he moved on to Central Saint Martins (then St Martins), where he studied fashion under Sheilagh Brown. Brown would later say: "When John Flett came for his interview his work was incredible, one of the tutors said not to give him a place as he looked like trouble. I replied 'that kind of trouble I love'."

At Central Saint Martins, Flett was part of a hothouse of talent – both in fashion and the London scene; his early 1980s peer group included not only Galliano, but also Stephen Jones, Darla Jane Gilroy, Sade and Chris Sullivan.

Flett's work attracted attention and his graduation collection was bought by key names, including Joseph Ettedgui (head of the London-based Joseph retail empire) and by buyers for Bloomingdales in New York.

== Career ==
From 1985, Flett became a part of the London high-fashion scene, exhibiting at London Fashion Week and at New York and Paris fashion weeks. Menswear was introduced to his range in 1986 and in 1987 he added a diffusion (lower-priced) line. By 1988, John Flett designs were available worldwide in 70 stores.

=== Brand hallmarks ===
The Guardian described Flett's brand signature as distinctively different for the times: "Along with John Galliano, who was a [sic] schoolfriend, he pioneered a new type of bias-cutting technique which imbued garments with a special fluidity and grace".

Kevin Almond has said: "much of Flett's skill was in his cutting, intricate and inventive, with which he developed clothes that seemed to cling to the body. In fact, many of his garments were difficult to understand on the hanger and needed to be worn to be appreciated". Sue Chowles, who worked with him on his spring/summer 1989 collection as an intern while studying at the Royal College of Art, has described his technique in more detail: "he never pattern cut his designs – instead he would drape the fabric and create the pattern on a mannequin".

Not all his early catwalk collections attracted acclaim. Writing in The Times about his first show in spring 1988, Liz Smith said that he: "has to learn to polish his act". But there was no doubt about his appeal to most of the British press and fashion buyers. An interview and double-page spread of photos of his collection in The Observer described his autumn 1988 catwalk show as: "triumphant". The interviewer said Flett's trademarks were about intricacy, involving clever draping on items such as a backless dress with no visible means of support. She described his finale outfit as: "a wondrous white creation that looked like a cross between a meringue and a crinkle-cut crisp".

== Later career and death ==
Despite the acclaim from both buyers and majority of the British fashion press, Flett was unable to sustain his business venture. His business affairs were described as a "rocky road" and he parted company with his backers in 1988/9.

He moved on to Paris to work for Claude Montana on the designer's debut collection for Lanvin. Flett relocated to Florence in 1990, where he worked for Italian designer Enrico Coveri on a menswear range (Coveri died in 1990).

Flett's obituaries in both The Times and The Guardian noted that at the time of his death, aged 27, he was on the point of signing a contract with the Milan fashion house Zuccoli to create a womenswear collection and relaunch his career.
