= Christopher McDonnell =

British fashion designer (born 1943)

- Born: 1943 (age 82–83)
- Occupations: Fashion designer; fashion journalist and academic

Christopher McDonnell is a British fashion designer who operated in the UK between the 1960s and 1980s. In the US, he was known under his own name, and in the UK he operated under the brand name Marrian-McDonnell before switching to an eponymous label in 1973.

Establishing a niche for sophisticated clothes in choice fabrics with a French approach to tailoring and style, McDonnell's designs were described by Angela Neustatter in 1973 as having a classic quality that set him apart from many of his contemporaries: "Christopher's clothes are not for the so-called 'beautiful' people; they are for people who just want to look beautiful – and there is a difference. We are all tired of fashion revolutions."

== Background and early career ==
Christopher McDonnell studied architecture before moving on to a fashion degree at the Royal College of Art under Janey Ironside. His first job after graduating was with the magazine Queen, then owned by Jocelyn Stevens, working on the fashion team led by Lady Clare Rendlesham.

== Launch of own label ==
In 1967, McDonnell established his fashion business close to Sloane Square with two friends Peter and Mary-Anne Marrian acting as business partners. His first collection was attended by a London correspondent of American fashion trade magazine Women's Wear Daily (WWD), who returned the next day with colleagues from New York. This resulted in a double-page spread in WWD and a tie-in with Saks Fifth Avenue, which made McDonnell's name more familiar in the US than the UK in the early days. The company he'd co-founded was known as Marrian-McDonnell initially to reflect the business partnership, while in the US the brand was always known as Christopher McDonnell.

In 1970, as part of the short-lived London Designer Collections (a successor to the Incorporated Society of London Fashion Designers), McDonnell showcased his work in a fashion show alongside designs by, among others, Mary Quant, Ossie Clark, Alice Pollock, Thea Porter, Gina Fratini and Caroline Charles. In 1971, he was among eleven UK fashion designers chosen for an exhibition showcasing British talent at The Louvre – at the invitation of the director of Musée des Arts Décoratifs – entitled L'Idee de la Forme. Other designers included Barbara Hulanicki, Bill Gibb, Jean Muir and Beatrice Bellini for Women's Home Industries – McDonnell chose to show an outfit comprising tweed tunic, tapestry-patterned sweater, blouson short pants with leggings and long doeskin cape.

In November 1971, a feature in The Guardian compared McDonnell's fashion direction to that of Jean Muir and said he planned to launch four collections a year. By this stage, McDonnell was also teaching at the Royal College of Art and his garments were stocked by the London tailor Simpsons of Piccadilly. Writing in The Times in 1972, Prudence Glynn described Marrian-McDonnell as a rarity in London, representing what many saw as the future of the fashion retail business: "It carries a range of clothes and accessories either all designed within the firm or very tightly edited to fit in with a recognizable style. The shops are small, individual and closely geared to the needs and tastes of a particular customer, who could always go there and know that she could find her kind of clothes."

A second Marrian-McDonnell store opened in South Molton Street in 1972. In 1973, the partnership with the Marrians was dissolved and McDonnell began trading in the UK under the brand name Christopher McDonnell Ltd, establishing a short-lived partnership with Graham Fraser (Fraser was formerly associated with Feathers boutique and later co-founded the label Workers for Freedom with McDonnell's one-time assistant Richard Nott). That year, McDonnell also produced a branded diffusion line for the raincoat maker Quelrayn, including embroidered cotton, velvet and seersucker coats.

=== Label hallmarks ===
Once described as the English Yves Saint Laurent for his French approach to tailoring and fabrics, McDonnell's design inspiration was Balenciaga and he said his aim was to design clothes that could be worn by women between the ages of 18 and 45. The label became well known for its woollen and jersey knitwear and its use of fine materials such as tweed and silk – although it also responded to fashion trends such as the early '70s craze for cheesecloth and calico. By 1973, an article in The Guardian noted he had carved a niche for daywear, in contrast to a focus on eveningwear by many designer contemporaries, and was the first British designer to produce a classic silk shirt for women. The article added: "He has a feeling for fabrics, whipping up the luxury naturals...in pure silk, raw silk, heavy linens, cottons, natural wools and cashmeres...His day clothes provide the perfect balance of the tailored and the dressmakery."

=== Purchase by Slater Walker ===
In 1974, McDonnell's business was bought by the bank Slater Walker. In 1975, with a flagship premises at 45 South Molton Street, the brand was singled out – along with Jeff Banks, Stephen Marks and Stirling Cooper – as a fashion house likely to survive the arrival of cheaper mass-market and 'no label' brands. At that stage, McDonnell's operation was smaller-scale than the other three – he handled everything from fabric selection to production of clothes. He had reduced his label's prices to compete in a market where increased manufacturing costs had narrowed the gap between high-end and high-street brands. In common with Ossie Clark and many French fashion houses, he had a manufacturing operation in Hong Kong.

By 1976, Slater Walker was mired in financial difficulties, having been bailed out by the Bank of England, and abruptly withdrew from its venture with Christopher McDonnell, leaving him – as he said in 1980 – "completely broke". He had to negotiate to get his brand name back, as it was by then owned by Haw Par Corporation under the Singapore group umbrella.

McDonnell collaborated with coatmaker Andre Peters to produce a designer label collection, before working abroad for two years. He returned to the UK in 1980 and produced a co-branded autumn collection for the couturier Mattli.

== Later career ==
Christopher McDonnell continued working in the fashion industry before becoming a fashion academic at Savannah College of Art and Design.
