= Jeffrey Rogers =

English fashion designer and retailer

- Occupations: Fashion designer and retailer
- Organizations: Jeffrey Rogers; Rogers + Rogers; Jeffrey & Paula
- Spouse: Paula Rogers
- Children: 3

Jeffrey Rogers established his eponymous company in the 1970s in Margaret Street, Soho, with a staff of three. Over time, his company grew to become a large international concern; by 1988 it had a turnover of £25 million and exported 15 per cent of production outside the UK.

During his organisation's 1980s heyday, Rogers was described by Judy Rumbold in The Guardian as "the T-shirt king", although his company was almost as ubiquitous for its knitwear, supplied to retailers such as TopShop, Miss Selfridge and John Lewis. Fashion journalist Brenda Polan described Rogers as: "one of Britain's most successful manufacturers of mass-market fashion, supplier to most of the zippy low-cost chains".

== Early career ==
Jeffrey Rogers began his career as a lift boy in Owen Owen's Finchley store. He then moved on to the role of floor sweeper in a coat factory. His first move into fashion proper was working for the brand Jump, owned by Louis Caring. He established his own company, Jeffrey Rogers, in a Soho basement in 1974, initially with a team of three people.

== 1980s expansion ==
The Jeffrey Rogers brand specialised in producing mass-market products for distribution to major high-street chain stores. Prices were competitive and by 1985, the company had a workforce of 350. Rogers told an interviewer in 1988 that his brand was producing 25 million T-shirts a year. His was the brand that created a ubiquitous RELAX T-shirt design in 1984 worn by Frankie Goes to Hollywood fans; as Judy Rumbold noted in a 1988 interview: "Which came first, the record or the t-shirt? Rogers is studiedly vague". Rogers' specialism was producing garments that were on trend for high-street shoppers, as he said: "There are five or six garments that everyone wants each season and we've got to make sure we make at least three or four of them".

=== Collaborations ===
In the early 1980s, Rogers had six different labels within the Jeffrey Rogers group. He began more high-fashion and upmarket collaborations, working first with two former Royal College of Art students Meghumi Ohki and Barbara Kennington on the Lumiere brand they had launched in 1977; they had the design background but wanted his input into the business side. In 1983, he collaborated with Sheilagh Brown, a high-fashion designer who had formerly worked with Stirling Cooper and Sheridan Barnett among others, and was then principal lecturer in fashion at Central Saint Martins. Initially the idea was to give her students the opportunity to design garments for commercial production. This, as described by Rogers, was an abysmal failure, but he liked working with Brown and invited her to design for him. Brown's own label designs proved so successful that she began designing for Jeffrey Rogers' more upmarket Portrait label as well.

Later in the 1980s, Rogers collaborated with Sandra Proctor, a former buyer at Miss Selfridge, to create the Easy Pieces label – designed as a competitor to brands such as French Connection and with a focus on knitwear.

== Later career ==
Over time Jeffrey Rogers' business grew into a large wholesale and retail operation. After difficult trading conditions at the start of the 1990s, he decided to build a retail business under the eponymous brand name. By 1994, there were 39 stores and the company was planning expansion into mainland Europe.

The company went into administration in 2001, by which stage it traded as both the Jeffrey Rogers and Rogers + Rogers brands and had some 600 employees and over 50 stores, including three overseas franchises. Inventory problems and high retail rental prices were cited as the causes of its difficulties. Rogers was the main shareholder. By 2002 Jeffrey Rogers the brand was part of the Matalan stable.

Jeffrey Rogers has continued to work in fashion design, establishing the Jeffrey & Paula label with his wife and working with retail operations such as Simply Be.
