= Women's Home Industries =

Designer from London

- Industry: Crafts, including knitting and tapestry
- Founded: 1947
- Headquarters: London, England
- Key people: Stella Isaacs, Marchioness of Reading; Beatrice Bellini

Women's Home Industries was a company founded in 1947 in London to earn export revenue for the UK in the post-war period by harnessing women's craft skills, such as knitting and needlework.

Originally seen as part of the effort to rebuild the economy – and a way to give women practical work they could do from home – between the 1950s and 1970s its reputation as a retailer and supplier of hand-made knits and traditional crafts grew, with exports to match. It appeared in media such as The Times and Vogue, while designer-makers such as Beatrice Bellini became known names in their own right. Kaffe Fassett was among those who supplied crafts for sale in its shops and he also collaborated on clothing with Bellini.

== Establishment and early years ==
Women's Home Industries was established in 1947. The key instigator was Stella Isaacs, Marchioness of Reading, who had founded the Women's Voluntary Service (WVS) in 1938 and became the company's chairman. Its stated aims were to stimulate women's craftsmanship and bring in dollars to Britain. It was publicised in its first year of business with an exhibition at Charing Cross tube station; a photograph of the exhibition is part of the London Transport Museum archive.

The idea came about because, as Lady Reading explained it to The Times, there was: "a wealth of talent in this country, unsurpassed anywhere in the world, and many who had travelled abroad in recent months felt sure that the products which British women could make in their own homes, using traditional British methods and designs, could be turned to dollar-making purposes". Initially, the WVS collected samples from its membership – including tapestry, embroidery, quilting and hand knitting – and the response inspired a start-up business supported by the Board of Trade. The company remained under the auspices of the WVS and operated initially from its HQ at 41 Tothill Street, SW1, but was a limited company.

The net of potential suppliers soon widened. The Times reported that only good work would be accepted (a board of experts would select the work) and payment would be at recognised minimum rates. Those whose standard of work passed muster, would then be supplied with a contract, instructions and materials designated of 'export only' quality. (This was during rationing and the utility scheme would be in operation for a further five years.) The scheme set out to generate overseas contracts and mass orders – it was suggested that suitable projects might include: "the equipping of a whole cathedral with kneelers". The initial call for samples requested high-quality knitted garments – particularly for children under five years old – as well as work in petit point and gros point. In October 1947, The Guardian reported that inquiries were "pouring in from every part of the country" and the first order from New York had been accepted.

=== Queen Mary's contribution ===
In her capacity as chair, Lady Reading travelled to the US in 1948. She took six tapestry seat covers with her that had been created by Queen Mary. The seat covers were in a floral design and made of grosgrain. Lady Reading's return on the Queen Elizabeth was reported in The Times, which said that the covers had been sold to Mrs Edward S. Harkness for $10,000. Profits from the sale were donated to the Queen's Institute of District Nursing.

Two years later, Queen Mary once again donated her own work to Women's Home Industries – this time a gros point carpet she had created over eight years, from 1941, and had been created to a traditional 18th-century design. Consisting of 12 panels, it was stitched together by the Royal School of Needlework, which had also supplied the design for Queen Mary to work on. The Times reported that, apart from the section joining, it had been all the Queen's own work – including blending of colours. Subsequently, the carpet was presented by Princess Elizabeth to the National Gallery of Canada, as a gift from the Imperial Order Daughters of the Empire.

=== 1950s production ===
By the early 1950s, Women's Home Industries was in the swing of production. A sale announcement in The Times in January 1951 described a range of goods, including women's cardigans and bed jackets, men's socks and sweaters and layette clothing for babies.

The royal association continued; in 1954 a fashion show and reception at The Dorchester was attended by the Duchess of Kent, while in 1957 the Queen Mother was among the needlewomen creating 72 kneelers for Washington National Cathedral. This order for the US cathedral also included communion rail kneelers and bishops' cushions and was to be located in the War Memorial Chapel.

By 1958, the association between the WVS and Women's Home Industries had ended, although Lady Reading continued as chair of both. That year, Alison Settle described the company's new "sweater shop" in West Halkin Street, saying: "They design superbly styled jackets, cardigans and pullovers for men, women and children...this idea has not caught on greatly here but is vastly popular in America, and exports account for the major part of their trade". Settle also described a new sweater elongated into a dress – a novel design first ordered by the store Magnins of California. While this was not to the British taste, the store's woollen party dresses for children were popular with both UK and US buyers.

== 1960s couture reputation ==
The company took on a far more commercial and fashion conscious approach as the 1960s dawned, although it already had a loyal customer base among US visitors to London and supplied several French couture houses. In 1963, the company appointed Foxbridge as its agent to handle the sales to US and Canadian markets.

In 1964, Women's Home Industries was part of an export promotion to the US, joining forces with names such as Simpsons, Burberry, Jaeger and Dunhill to send a large shipment of menswear to Bloomingdales and Filene's. This was supported with a ten-page promotional feature on London W1 fashion in Sports Illustrated.

Writing in The Guardian, Alison Adburgham said: "There is nothing homely about the hand-knits". She described a revival both of traditional crafts and patterns – its 'wedding ring' (cobweb) shawls, so fine they could be pulled through a ring, were made in the Outer Hebrides using single-ply Shetland wool and some took over six months to make. Most of the creators of these cobweb shawls were elderly women – younger knitters lacked the patience – and patterns were said to be based on lace designs worn by survivors of the Spanish Armada washed up on the islands. At the other end of the scale, its chunky men's knits included not only Arans, but also traditional English patterns such as a Northumberland Seahouses design, based on a traditional fisherman's guernsey sweater and sourced from authorities on traditional patterns.

=== Hosiery and hand-made knits ===
A year later, Women's Home Industries (now sometimes known by the acronym WHI), was featured in a fashion piece about the latest trends in hosiery, including the 'dressmaker stocking' – a stocking cut to the leg shape from unusual and decorative fabrics and seamed up the back. The article reported that: "Women's Home Industries has been red hot with enthusiasm from customers for handknit stockings in thick wool". For summer it had produced cotton designs – mostly crocheted in pastel colours and costing four guineas a pair. By this stage, Women's Home Industries was supplying Jaeger with crocheted stockings and gloves sets in colours such as pale blue and lemon yellow.

This was part of a trend towards all things handcrafted, as a writer in The Times put it in 1966: "The hand-made look is infinitely desirable – provided that other hands have done the work. Nimble-fingered grandmothers all over the country have been pressed into service to produce the kind of work their granddaughters laughed at three years ago. The Women's Home Industries...has a booming business collecting and retailing the products of domestic craft". Two years on, Prudence Glynn also noted the demand for clothes that "at least look handmade", suggesting this might be a desire for individuality in an era of mass production. She recommended Women's Home Industries as "the real McCoy". During the 1960s the company's products began appearing in high-fashion features – for instance, its extra long knitted scarf costing six guineas was worn with a swagger-back mink coat and fur-lined boots in a fashion feature about wrapping up for the weather in January 1969.

By this stage, Women's Home Industries was not only operating from West Halkin Street, but also had a dedicated tapestry store in Pimlico Road, specialising in canvas embroidery work and taking on client commissions, which were executed by trained artists designing exclusively for the shop.

== Workforce and production methods ==
Suppliers for Women's Home Industries remained largely home-based. In 1964, there were over 3,000 knitters based around the country, said to be ranging in age from young to elderly. A 1970 Times article about part-time working said that the company was looking for between 300 and 400 hand knitters to supply its store. It was also looking for crochet, tapestry and needlepoint workers. To apply for knitting commissions, women were advised to send in a three-inch knitted swatch created in stocking stitch. Upon approval, a test commission would be offered (this would be paid work). Rates thereafter depended on the complexity of the commission but started at around 30 shillings for a plain cardigan.

While the knitting was done at home, the making up was undertaken in Women's Home Industries' workrooms, where garments were moulded, seamed and sometimes lined. It was this, according to Alison Adburgham, that gave its products the couture look. WHI would also undertake repairs and specialist cleaning at its West Halkin Street premises.

=== Influence of Beatrice Bellini ===
From the 1950s on, Beatrice Bellini was a key influence on the direction of Women's Home Industries, acting as its designer and also sourcing yarns in keeping with fashion trends. In the 1960s she was sourcing Lurex and silk yarns to ensure WHI kept pace with the vogue for knitwear as evening wear. In some instances, she had yarn spun to her own designs and would also ensure that each new pattern was based on a toile (test garment). She would also source the knitters best suited to each particular garment.

Such was her reputation at the start of the 1970s, that Bellini was one of eleven UK fashion names chosen for an exhibition showcasing British talent at The Louvre – at the invitation of the director of Musée des Arts Décoratifs – entitled L'Idee de la Forme. It was funded by the Foreign and Commonwealth Office and included industrial and graphic design. Other fashion names in the mix included Barbara Hulanicki, Bill Gibb, Jean Muir, Ossie Clark and Christopher McDonnell. Accessories were supplied by names such as jewellers Gerda Flockinger and Wendy Ramshaw and shoemakers The Chelsea Cobbler and Rayne. The selector for the fashion end of the exhibition was Michael Haynes, with Elsbeth Juda as advisor.

Bellini also assisted other leading craftspeople, notably Kaffe Fassett. He recalls in his autobiography taking a needlepoint design to Women's Home Industries' tapestry shop, which Bellini was running at the time. She asked him to create more designs and these were sold through the store, with clients subsequently requesting private commissions from Fassett. During the 1970s, Fassett also supplied hand knits for Beatrice Bellini and needlepoint kits for Women's Home Industries.

== Archive material ==
An archive for Women's Home Industries, including knitting patterns, garments and sample books is held in the University of the Arts' London College of Fashion archive.

The Victoria and Albert Museum has several items by Women's Home Industries, including a 1950s Beatrice Bellini sweater that so impressed the couturier Edward Molyneux that he permitted it to be named "Molyneux" in his honour. Its archive also contains a colourful 1970s skirt designed by Kaffe Fassett and made up by Beatrice Bellini.
