= Kimberly McDonald =

American jeweler based in New York City

- Known for: Jewelry designer
- Notable work: Geodes, Agates Opals and Diamonds

Kimberly McDonald is an American jeweler based in New York City, known for designs that feature geodes, agates, opals and diamonds. Her jewelry is sold by Bergdorf Goodman, Browns of London, and the Kimberly McDonald boutique in Atlanta, Georgia.

== Early life ==
Born in North Carolina, McDonald began her career as a jewelry curator, helping her clients build collections.

== Career ==
In 2007 she started her eponymous brand with an ethical design ethos at the core of her collections. For her jewelry, she uses organic materials like agates and geodes and works with diamonds, emeralds, and baroque pearls.

Her jewelry has been worn by Brooke Shields, Sarah Jessica Parker, Cindy Crawford, Cameron Diaz, and Michelle Obama, who wore a Jason Wu gown cinched at the neckline by a Kimberly McDonald diamond-embellished handmade ring to President Barack Obama’s second inaugural ball on January 21, 2013. Both the gown and McDonald's ring now reside in the National Archives.

== Philanthropy ==
Since 2012 McDonald has been supporting The Performing Animal Welfare Society (PAWS).
McDonald also serves on the advisory board at Children of Conservation.
