= Michael Sherard =

British fashion designer (1910–1998)

- Born: Malcolm Henry Sherrard; 17 July 1910; Kingston-upon-Thames, Surrey, United Kingdom
- Died: 26 December 1998 (aged 88); London, United Kingdom
- Occupation: Fashion designer
- Notable credit(s): Fellow of the Royal Society of Arts, 1966

Michael Sherard (17 July 1910 – 26 December 1998) was a British fashion designer and a member of the Incorporated Society of London Fashion Designers, which represented the British couture industry in the wartime and post-war years. Operating his own label from the 1940s to 1960s, he is remembered primarily for his evening and occasion gowns. He also helped train future British designers, including Caroline Charles, and was later a design academic.

== Early life and career ==
Michael Sherard was born Malcolm Henry Sherrard, recorded in portraits of his family now held by the National Portrait Gallery. Later he would change his professional name, but insist that he was not a couturier but a dressmaker. Eustace and Ida Sherrard had five other sons and lived in Kingston-upon-Thames, then part of the county of Surrey. Sherard's father was a City solicitor and his grandfather George C. Sherrard had been mayor of Kingston three times.

Sherard was educated at Berkhamsted School, where one of his teachers developed his love of the classics and encouraged his interest in drawing and theatre. He refused to follow his father and study law and was instead enrolled at Westminster School of Art, graduating in 1931.

He showed his work to Norman Hartnell – already a leading name in London couture – who turned him down as an assistant, recommending that he go to Paris. With his first choice rejecting him, Sherard secured a role as assistant to Peter Russell, known for his no-nonsense manner and designs for country ladies. While the two were not natural soulmates, Sherard did learn the business practicalities of running a couture house, but the stress of his job led to a duodenal ulcer. He spent the war years in the Admiralty as an assistant in the trade division censoring cables.

== Establishment of label ==
One of Peter Russell's couture clients, the opera singer Ruth Vincent, introduced Sherard to her son John Fraser. The two became business partners and the Michael Sherard showroom opened in 1945 at 24 Connaught Street, Marble Arch; much of the financial backing came from their families. When the business opened, Peter Russell – who had by now also lost his client Ruth Vincent to Norman Hartnell because of his temper – is said to have remarked that Sherard was: "the wrong side of Edgware Road".

Although Sherard's salon was not in the best London location, his charm and attention to detail soon drew prestigious clients, including Margot Fonteyn, Margaret Lockwood, Phyllis Calvert and Gladys Cooper. One of his early collections was sold to Chicago department store Marshall Field's, a significant boost for his business and British couture's reputation. In 1948, he joined the Incorporated Society of London Fashion Designers – entrance required a vote from existing members – making him one of the leading names in London fashion design. Sherard not only created gowns for private clients, but also costumes for some 30 West End theatre productions, including The Mousetrap and The Reluctant Debutante, during this period.

His business had support from other members of the family, with his sister-in-law – referred to in a newspaper article simply as "Mrs Sherrard", the wife of his brother Peter – acting as his chief assistant, taking charge of the label's publicity and providing advice on collections.

By 1952, Sherard had accrued enough funds and reputation to move to a new salon in Curzon Street, Mayfair and he also lived in nearby Albany for two years, sharing a grand apartment at a stellar London address with Fraser and two dachshunds Hansel and Humperdinck; it was the location of many parties. The events surrounding the Coronation of Elizabeth II created more business for the firm, with some 40 assistants creating outfits for a growing clientele.

=== Brand hallmarks ===
Lavish occasion outfits – whether New Look-inspired ballgowns or slimline and classical sheath dresses – were Sherard's forte and his bestsellers. Throughout the 1950s and early '60s, he developed variations on these themes, such as a black lace and taffeta flamenco-style cocktail dress that is now part of the Victoria and Albert Museum (V&A) archive and featured in its 2007 exhibition The Golden Age of Couture. A 1961 review of his spring lines syndicated to the US and Canadian press describes his use of the 'wagtail' line (short at the front tapering to long at the back) on jackets. The review noted that he had even used this style to create a bolero with full-length train for the bridal gown in his show's finale.

== Later career ==
In the early 1950s Sherard attempted to branch out into ready-to-wear with a line known as Pumkin, but this proved unsuccessful. In common with other London couturiers, he found business increasingly difficult in the 1960s because of high production costs and the emergence of a new breed of youth-focused ready-to-wear designers. Sherard closed his business in 1964 and went on to lecture at London and Shoreditch Colleges of Fashion as a second career. He was elected fellow of the Royal Society of Arts (RSA) in 1966 and also became closely involved with the City liveries, acting as master of the Worshipful Company of Girdlers (1959–60) and helping to organise the rebuilding of Girdlers' Hall (bombed during the war), for which he also laid the foundation stone. The stone laid is inscribed with Sherard's birth name – Malcolm Henry Sherrard.

=== Legacy ===
Caroline Charles was among Sherard's assistants in the 1960s, subsequently moving on to Mary Quant before launching her own couture label that dressed both rock stars and royalty. The designer Murray Arbeid – also noted for his elegant evening gowns – was an assistant at the fashion house. In 2012, Sherard's work formed part of the exhibition Glamour, a retrospective of 100 years of evening wear held at the Bath Museum of Costume. Some of his designs and his work drawings also form part of the V&A fashion archive.
