= Stella Isaacs, Marchioness of Reading =

English philanthropist (1894–1971)

The Most Honourable The Marchioness of Reading GBE
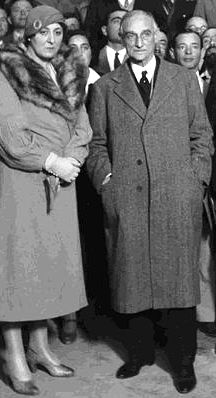
- Lady Reading (left), c. 1935

Member of the House of Lords Lord Temporal
- In office 22 September 1958 – 22 May 1971; Life Peerage

Personal details
- Born: Grace Stella Charnaud; 6 January 1894
- Died: 22 May 1971 (aged 77)
- Spouse: Rufus Isaacs, 1st Marquess of Reading (m. 1931; died 1935)

Stella Isaacs, Marchioness of Reading, Baroness Swanborough, GBE (née Charnaud; 6 January 1894 – 22 May 1971) was an English philanthropist who is best remembered as the founder and chairman of the Women's Voluntary Service (WVS), now known as Royal Voluntary Service.

Lady Reading championed promoting Anglo-American relations, not only as the wife of a former British Ambassador to the U.S., but also in her peacetime role helping to rebuild the British economy and find stimulating employment for women – both voluntary and paid. In addition to the WVS, she also established the company Women's Home Industries, a highly successful exponent of British craft and cultural traditions in clothing and textiles, but also an extensive exporter to the United States, Canada, and sometimes France.

She served on boards of various cultural bodies, including the BBC Advisory Board and Glyndebourne, and was a keen early supporter of the University of Sussex. In 1958, she became the first woman to take a seat in the House of Lords in her own right. A 1963 profile in The Observer said: "the W.V.S. has brought out in her the latent political talent and the strength of character that once induced someone to say of her that had she been a man she would have become Prime Minister".

== Early life and career ==
Stella Charnaud was born on 6 January 1894 in Constantinople (now Istanbul). Her father Charles Charnaud was a director of the tobacco monopoly of the Ottoman Empire. Her mother, Milbah Johnson, was from Lincolnshire and was Charnaud's second wife. The family lived on the Asian side of the Bosphorus at Moda.

Due to poor health, much of Stella Charnaud's education was via private tutors. A 1963 profile provided more background on her childhood. She was the fifth of nine Charnaud children – with four brothers and four sisters – and was exactly in the middle. Spinal troubles confined her to bed for "months and years", but she would later speak of its advantages – not least that she became a listening post for her siblings and half siblings. She said: "it was like being the spider in the middle of a large web". The Observer suggested it had taught her the art of diplomacy. While she would later describe herself as "brung up", because of her lack of formal education, she combined learning from the local Church of England chaplain with the tutelage of a governess at home. She spoke fluent French and German and some Italian and Greek.

Her Times obituary said that during World War I, she worked for the British Red Cross Society, gaining experience that would inform her future work. The Observer profile told her First War history somewhat differently, saying that she joined the Voluntary Aid Detachment – then a volunteer nursing group directed by the Red Cross – but was demoted to pantry maid because of her tendency to faint at the sight of blood.

Charles Charnaud had lost his money during the war and this meant Stella Charnaud looked for employment, initially working in a solicitor's office. Her Oxford Dictionary of National Biography entry says she began her training as a secretary in London in 1914, the year that war broke out.

In 1925, she was asked to join the Viceroy's staff in Delhi, India. Initially, she served as secretary to Lady Reading, the wife of the Viceroy, Rufus Isaacs, 1st Earl of Reading, but soon rose to become chief of staff to the Viceroy. Later, she worked as his private secretary at Imperial Chemical Industries, of which he was president and at his London home in Curzon Street, Mayfair.

After Alice Isaacs' death in 1930, Charnaud became his political hostess. The couple married on 6 August 1931 – he was 71 and she was 37 and The Observer profile noted that this alliance was greeted with "universal applause". From this point on she became Marchioness of Reading – usually addressed as Lady Reading. A biography notes that while the transition from secretary to marchioness and wife of a man twice her age who was also foreign secretary (Rufus Isaacs held this role briefly between August–October 1931) might have been a formidable challenge for many women, she adapted easily to the role and gained widespread acceptance. In 1932 she became chair of the Personal Service League, a voluntary organisation concerned with helping ameliorate poverty during the Great Depression.

=== Anglo-American 'mission' ===
Although Lady Reading's marriage was a brief one – Lord Reading died in 1935 – it became a driving force in her life and, she said, influenced much of her later work. Her Observer profile described how he told her that after his death she would want to "serve the country", describing in detail how this could be effected. He also impressed upon her the value of the relationship between the United States and the UK – Lord Reading was a former Ambassador to the US – suggesting that the future of democracy might depend upon a better understanding of the Americans by the British.

After the Marquess' death in 1935, she experienced a period of "shock and disorientation". This was described in far more detail in the 1963 Observer profile. She immediately travelled to the United States. There she travelled by car across the country, staying in dollar-a-night lodgings and working as a dish-washer in order to understand "ordinary" Americans. This fact-finding mission was put to an end in somewhat unusual circumstances: "Her mission evidently caused some concern about her own well-being. In the end she was stopped on the road by a bewildered State Trooper who said: 'The President wants you to call him'". She returned to Washington, D.C., and would remain a close friend thereafter of Eleanor Roosevelt – the two shared an interest in alleviating poverty and wrote to each other fortnightly for years after her trip.

=== Early voluntary and social work ===
Even before her husband's death Lady Reading had become active in voluntary social work, chairing the Personal Service League, created to serve the needy and unemployed. She served on the Ullswater Commission on Broadcasting in 1935 as the only female member of the committee (later she would become a member of the BBC Advisory Council).

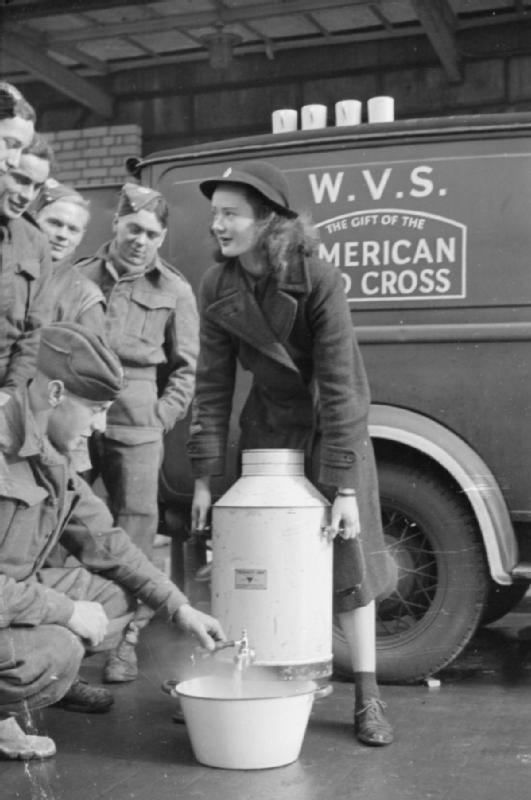
A WVS mobile 'Blitz Canteen' in 1941 – the canteens operated across London to provide refreshments to troops and civilians

== Women's Voluntary Service ==
In 1938, a year before the start of World War II, Home Secretary Samuel Hoare sent for Lady Reading and requested that she establish an organisation of women that would assist the government and local authorities if war were declared. Lady Reading founded the Women's Voluntary Service for Air Raid Precautions Services, later referred to simply as the Women's Voluntary Service or by its initials WVS. The structure was created by her.

The WVS recruited women across the country – one million by 1942. The approach was to recruit women from all walks of life and avoid excessive bureaucracy or committees. Women wore uniforms, but there was a focus on individual initiative. Duties were wide-ranging, from providing support to the armed services and to refugees, to the evacuation of children, pregnant women and other vulnerable people from cities at risk of bombing.

Initially it organised a great many training courses, from driving in the blackout to childcare and "train the trainers" sessions. In London, courses were taught in many languages, including Italian, Dutch and Yiddish, for foreign nationals in the WVS. On 31 August 1939, with war inevitable, immediate evacuation from cities was ordered. Following over a year of preparation 1.5 million people were evacuated by Isaacs's WVS over the next three days.

As the war progressed, the WVS, funded by the government and local authorities, fed, clothed and re-housed civilians affected by air raids.

The WVS continued in peacetime; in the immediate post-war period it assisted with the problems caused by shortages of food, fuel and housing. Its transition continued in the years afterwards; in 1963 it still had some 1,200 depots around the country. It remained voluntary and became not just an arm of civil defence but of the welfare state.

=== Women's Home Industries ===
After the war had ended, Lady Reading became involved in another venture designed to assist the nation and engage women's efforts. Women's Home Industries was originally established in 1947 to stimulate women's craftsmanship and earn dollars for Britain. Initially, the WVS collected samples from its membership – including tapestry, embroidery, quilting and hand knitting – and the response inspired a start-up business supported by the Board of Trade.

The company remained under the auspices of the WVS and operated initially from its HQ at 41 Tothill Street, London SW1, but was a limited company. Lady Reading served as chair of the company, as well as the WVS, and it split from the WVS in the 1950s. It remained a highly successful exporter of professionally finished clothing and crafts – notably to the United States – as well as supplying couture houses, with most suppliers being home-based women.

== House of Lords ==
The Marchioness was created a life baroness by letters patent on 23 September 1958, one of only four women in the first cohort of fourteen creations. She took the title Baroness Swanborough, of Swanborough in the County of Sussex to sit on the Crossbenches. On introduction she was the first female peer to sit in the Lords. Her maiden speech questioned the government's policy on refugees and displaced persons of whom she had some war experience. She praised the work of the voluntary services, of which she had been a valid member. She urged the Macmillan government to support the work of the UNHCR worldwide. In her speeches she paid particular attention to the plight of stateless children, who for legal reasons were incapable of achieving citizenship.

She chaired the Home Office's Advisory Council (1962–5) that played a leading role in facilitating the "Windrush" migration to Britain from the Commonwealth. In 1965 she was appointed the working party on the place of the Voluntary Service in After Care. She referred to the prison system and rights of prisoners on release, how they might be cared for, and what rights and obligations they might have.

== Other roles ==
From 1936 to 1968, Lady Reading was vice-chair of the Imperial Relations Trust. She was a member of the BBC Advisory Board and vice-chair of its Board of Governors from 1947 to 1951. She chaired the Home Office Advisory Council on Commonwealth Immigration and led a working party on the after-care of prisoners released from jail.

She was also an early supporter of the University of Sussex (founded 1961) and bequeathed her private residence, Swanborough Manor, to be used as the residence of the university's vice chancellor for 50 years after her death. The university sold the manor in 2003. She was also a trustee of Glyndebourne.

== Public recognition ==
She was appointed a Dame Commander of the Order of the British Empire (DBE) in 1941, and promoted to Dame Grand Cross (GBE) in 1944. On 22 September 1958, she was created a life peer in her own right, becoming Baroness Swanborough. She was the first woman to take her seat in the House of Lords.

She was awarded honorary doctorates by the universities of Reading (1947), Yale (1958), Manitoba (1960) and Leeds (1969), and by Smith College (1956).

In 2025, Baroness Swanborough was one of ten women "who played vital roles during World War II" to be honoured with a silhouette statue created by Standing with Giants for the Women of War exhibition at Lincoln's International Bomber Command Centre.

=== Arms ===
Coat of arms of Stella Isaacs, Marchioness of Reading
Notes CA MS Grants 121/224 Escutcheon Argent a chevron Vert between in chief two bees volant and in base three slips of rosemary two in saltire and one in pale leaved and flowered Proper. Supporters On either side a member of the Women's Voluntary Service the dexter in the uniform of an ordinary member the sinister in the uniform worn by a member of the Welfare Section of the Civil Defence Corps all Proper. Motto Not Why We Can't But How We Can

== External sources ==
- Oxford Dictionary of National Biography entry
- Royal Voluntary Service home page
- National Portrait Gallery portraits
