= Stirling Cooper =

British fashion chain

- Company type: fashion chain
- Founded: 1967
- Headquarters: London, UK
- Key people: Ronnie Stirling, Jeff Cooper, (founders), Jane Whiteside (co-founder and designer), Antony Price, Sheilagh Brown (designers)

Stirling Cooper was a London-based fashion wholesaler and retailer that, along with brands such as Biba, Quorum, Browns and Clobber, helped to redefine UK fashion in the late 1960s.

Part of the Swinging London scene in the early years, and with a destination store on Wigmore Street that attracted rock stars such as Mick Jagger, it grew into a substantial wholesaler and retailer and was even more influential in the 1970s, when UK-wide concessions created accessible and affordable high fashion.

== Establishment ==
Stirling Cooper was started by two London cab drivers Ronnie Stirling and Jeff Cooper in 1967. It was initially a small-scale operation and sales techniques included using a London double-decker bus as a mobile showroom. In September 1967, Stirling and Cooper were introduced to a Royal College of Art fashion graduate Jane Whiteside; the introduction came through Diane Wadey, a buyer for the Oxford Street department store Peter Robinson, who had met Whiteside during a pre-graduation project. It was Whiteside who provided the initial fashion direction for the Stirling Cooper brand.

Initially, the company operated as a wholesale operation only and focused on womenswear. By March 1968, Whiteside's first designs for Stirling Cooper were featured in a spread in The Times, even though at this stage the designs were only available at Peter Robinson's London and Sheffield stores, a booth at Kensington Market called Make Believe Dreams and another booth at Bond Street market. Influential Times fashion editor Prudence Glynn introduced Whiteside as a new talent in the London fashion scene.

=== Opening of first store ===
In October 1969, Glynn recommended a visit to the new Stirling Cooper boutique in Wigmore Street, describing its strange decor in graphic detail: "Ingress, or rather descent, is through the jaws of a dragon and you expect to find yourself in a salon with a digestive tract decor. In fact, once you have been swallowed by Geoffrey Vivas' smiling monster the style is Japanese bath house." After warning Times readers about the skimpy and body-revealing doors of the women's changing rooms, Glynn added that this store was the best way to see Whiteside's whole collection in context. She described dresses trousers and shirts embellished with men's silver trouser buttons, adding: "free from the qualms of any store buyer she does ankle-length bonded jersey skirts, long waistcoats, tie-around spiv jackets and saggy mid-length jersey coats. A whole personal statement in clothes at such modest prices that the message reaches a mass audience."

Menswear was also included in the new store and was designed by Antony Price, who had been co-opted by Whiteside straight from the Royal College of Art and was then 24. Less than a month later, Times fashion journalist Anthony King-Deacon previewed the new men's range, describing Price as: "one of the brightest young men in menswear designing in London." The article featured an image of Price in a long Stirling Cooper coat and described a limited range that featured safari jackets and wide-collared, pleated-sleeved shirt-waisters.

The shop was a testing ground for new ideas that might later be included in the wholesale range, King-Deacon reported, and he defined it as effectively a couture house, the key differences being the ready-to-wear designs, the limited choice of sizes and the low prices. Turnaround on designs was rapid – as little as two weeks – and men's and women's clothes were made up in the same factory and in similar materials to bypass the tradition of higher manufacturing prices for menswear. Price said: "If cats had to pay as much as chicks for their garb they would automatically get hung up about fashion. But I think I know where it's at as far as a fella's clothes are concerned. I keep them new and cheap and different". Clothes were usually manufactured in the East End, with knitwear and jersey being produced in Leicester.

Price's directional garments attracted a large fan base – especially after Mick Jagger became a customer of Stirling Cooper, wearing Price's button-side trousers on the 'Gimme Shelter' tour. In September 1969, Stirling Cooper was among the brands – alongside Clobber, Quorum and John Marks – to receive financial assistance from the Clothing Export Council to attend the Paris prêt-à-porter (ready-to-wear) fashion fair, showing on a group stand. According to Jeff Banks, the British designers: "tore into the French."

The company employed a pattern cutter called Lenny Rosen who was also production manager. In the late '60s Stirling Cooper took on a partnership with a tailoring company based in London called Sheraton. This brought Rosen's talents to the fore as he excelled in the quirky styles of its various designers. Rosen's protege was 18-year-old Roy (Wiggings) King. The pattern cutter Denise Dudman, while working for Stirling Cooper, would cut the first patterns for Jeff Cooper's first solo collection ....

King graded the patterns for this collection. Later he went on to form the Roy King brand, selling to Harrods, Selfridges and independent retailers throughout the UK. He also opened shops in the north west, trading as Academy, Metropolis, Metropolis Junior and Reaction Premiere.

Jef Cooper asked Sheridan Barnett & Sheilagh Brown to create the Look & design the clothes for his new brand called Coopers. Jef kept the wonderful Stirling Cooper shop in Wigmore St . Working out of the studios in South Molton St & Clifford St, Sheridan Barnett & Sheilagh Brown created iconic clothes that were featured in all the most influential fashion magazines & media of the time .(see Sunday Times editorial by Michael Roberts and Molly Parkin, photographs by Guy Bourdin 6/8/72 ). After a year, they moved on to join Ossie Clark & Alice Pollock at Quorum, where they created some of the most iconic fashion looks of the decade . They went on, several years later, to creat their own, critically acclaimed, collections under the Jazz label. Later in their careers, they worked independently under their own label and also designed & consulted for major fashion companies Jaeger and Marks & Spencer

== Brand expansion and designers ==
By 1970, Stirling Cooper was producing handbags, belts and accessories that were stocked by the new Bata shoe shop on Oxford Street. Jane Whiteside's original design direction for womenswear was continued by a team of young designers, including Sheilagh Brown – also from the Royal College of Art and later to work with Sheridan Barnett – Phyllis Collins and Judy (Judith) Ullman; Ullman would later design for Moons. Price remained with Stirling Cooper until late 1971, moving on to the boutique Che Guevara.

=== Change of ownership ===
In 1972, original partners Ronnie Stirling and Jeff Cooper split – reportedly due to the pressures of the business. Jeff Cooper joined Radley/Quorum after working with Sheilagh Brown and Sheridan Barnett on the Coopers brand, while Ronnie Stirling remained at the helm of Stirling Cooper.

In 1975, the brand was singled out – along with Jeff Banks, Stephen Marks and Christopher McDonnell – as a fashion house likely to weather the arrival of cheaper mass-market and 'no label' brands. Chris Poulton was righthand man to Ronnie Stirling and a team of designers worked for the brand. A key survival strategy was to continually drip-feed new styles into stores throughout the season, combining staple fashion items with more outrageous lines to attract attention. Poulton noted: "Our aim is always to stick to an identifiable look so that people who like us will always look for our label". By this stage, the business encompassed a shop in New Bond Street, a concession in Peter Robinson and a wholesale showroom servicing 30 in-store concessions nationally, as well as licensing and distribution deals internationally. South African-born Michael Conitzer, who had joined Stirling Cooper in 1972 after training at Marks & Spencer, went on to become managing director. In 1980, he began to market a range of condoms in the stores which later became the Jiffi brand. Conitzer moved on from Stirling Cooper in 1992 and founded the Kings Road Sporting Club in Chelsea which became lululemon in 2015.

== New directions and brand demise ==
Paul Dass bought the Stirling Cooper business in 1992 and decided to move it back to its original focus on working with up-and-coming designers. Initially he recruited Bella Freud, who spent a year with the brand producing signature pieces such as suits and skinny knits. In 1994, he recruited Nicholas Knightly, tipped as a rising star of the fashion industry, to produce a designer collection. Dass also undertook a refurbishment programme, using David Quigley Architects to create urban-themed interiors for its six stores, including the Oxford Street flagship. The company ceased trading in the 1990s.
