= Suzy Menkes =

British journalist and fashion critic (born 1943)

Suzy Menkes OBE
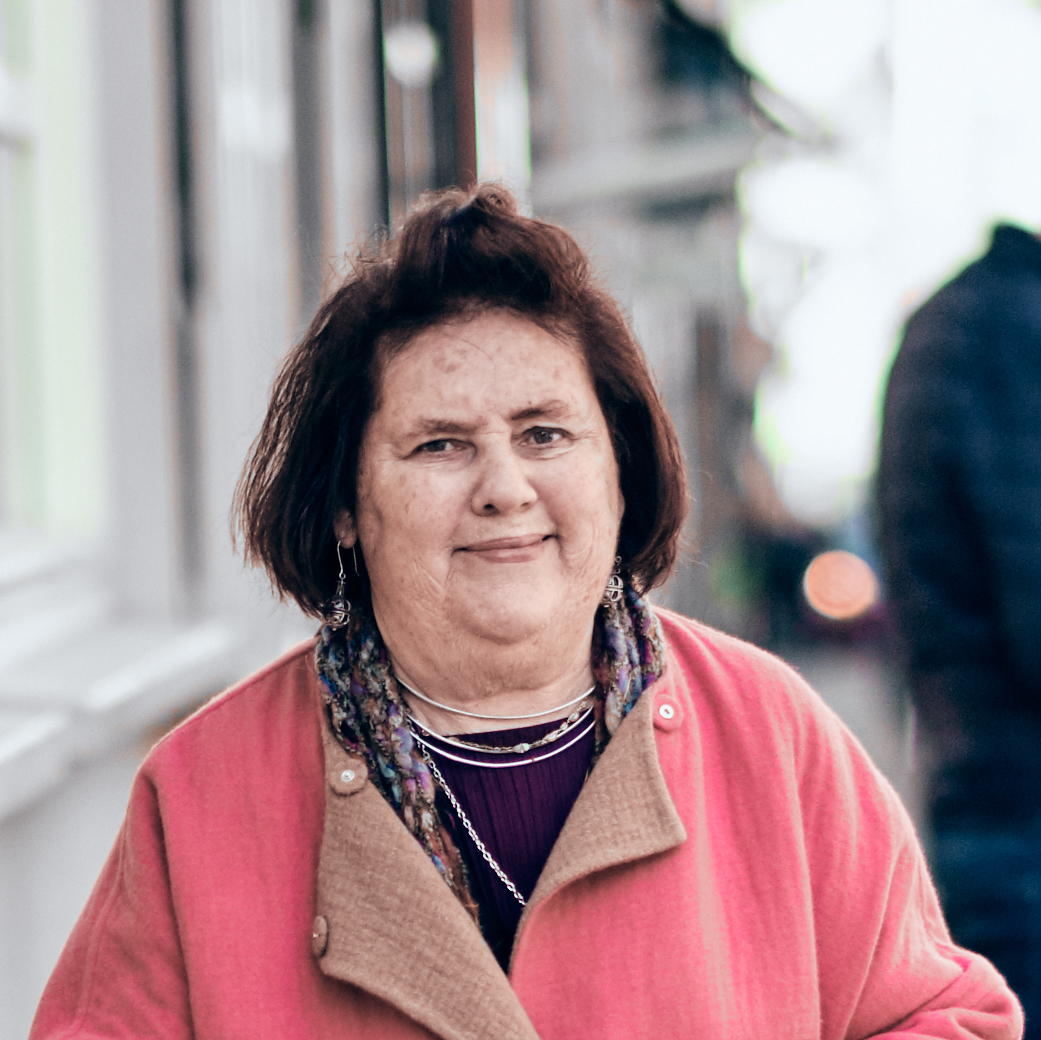
- Menkes in 2019
- Born: Suzy Peta Menkes; 24 December 1943 (age 82); Beaconsfield, Buckinghamshire, England
- Occupations: Journalist, fashion critic
- Years active: 1966–present
- Notable credit(s): Vogue, The Times, The New York Times, The International Herald Tribune, Harper's Bazaar

Suzy Peta Menkes OBE (born 24 December 1943) is a British journalist and fashion critic. Formerly the fashion editor for the International Herald Tribune, Menkes also served as editor, Vogue International, for 25 international editions of Vogue online until October 2020.

== Early life and education ==
Menkes was born in Beaconsfield, Buckinghamshire. She was educated at Brighton and Hove High School. As a teenager in the 1960s, she moved to Paris to study dressmaking at what has now become ESMOD. Her landlady gained her entry into her first couture show at Nina Ricci, which sparked her interest in high fashion.

On her return from Paris, she read history and English literature at Newnham College, Cambridge while her sister studied at Oxford. During her college years, she became the first female editor of the college newspaper and of a university newspaper, Varsity.

== Career ==
After Cambridge, she worked for The Times reporting on fashion. In addition to her journalism, she has written several books, particularly on British Royal style.

Menkes professes to admire "good journalism", especially the work of Prudence Glynn at the Times of London and Eugenia Sheppard of the New York Herald Tribune. After leaving Cambridge in 1966, where she was the first woman who signed up to work for Varsity, and later became its first female editor-in-chief, the university's newspaper, she joined The Times as a junior reporter. At age 24, Menkes took her first job as a fashion journalist at the London Evening Standard, where she had been recruited by editor Charles Wintour, who became her mentor.

He really made me understand that as a fashion editor, or any other role at the paper, you are conduit to the public. You’re supposed to take in this information and then pass it on – that idea that, as a journalist, you’ve got to really take things in and then explain them in a way that's comprehensible to other people. That's the job.

Then, she joined the Daily Express, before returning to The Times, where she met her late husband and father of her three sons, David Spanier. She left The Times and joined The Independent in 1987, which she later left for the International Herald Tribune in 1988.

After 25 years commenting on fashion at The International Herald Tribune, she left in 2014 saying that:

The Tribune left me. It morphed [in 2013] into the International New York Times. New people came in; nothing felt the same. It was the ideal time to move, and my new job is a terrific idea because is there anything more international than fashion?

In 2014, Jonathan Newhouse, chairman of Condé Nast International, appointed her the online voice of Vogue's international editions, working as "a critic and reporter on Vogue's websites across the world". She was also responsible for organising Condé Nast International's annual Luxury Conference.

During the first lockdown of 2020, she launched her podcast, Creative Conversations with Suzy Menkes. Here she presents in-depth interviews with the fashion industry's most influential designers, thinkers and executives, including Duro Olowu, Giancarlo Giammetti, Maria Grazia Chiuri of Dior, Marine Serre, Michael Kors and Natalia Vodianova.

== Personal life ==
Menkes is widowed and has three sons, three granddaughters and three grandsons. Menkes is a Jewish convert.

== Awards and honours ==
She holds the Legion d'Honneur in France and a British OBE.

== Reputation ==
Menkes's trademark is her pompadour, an exaggerated hairstyle that was first popularised by Madame de Pompadour, the favourite mistress of King Louis XV, in the 18th century. She has been nicknamed "Samurai Suzy" by the fashion press for her frankness and taste for fashion maximalism.

In November 2009, she appeared as one of the judges on the finale of the Lifetime TV series Project Runway. In 1996, she appeared in the second "Last Shout" special in the British comedy series Absolutely Fabulous, playing herself. In 2016, she appeared in Absolutely Fabulous: The Movie.

Unlike many of her fashion counterparts, Menkes systematically refuses gifts from fashion brands. She openly criticised what she called "The Circus of Fashion" in an article issued in The New York Times in 2013, denouncing the attitude of bloggers and stars followers of street style dressed like "peacocks" to draw the attention of photographers during Fashion week.

During her marriage to David Spanier, she converted to Judaism, and now refrains from attending fashion shows that take place on Holy days. Accessible and curious, Menkes has a reputation for being eager to discuss fashion with young designers. "Like a slightly mad auntie, she is", Kate Moss told The New Yorker magazine, in its 2003 profile of Menkes.

In fashion circles, Menkes is known for her sharp critiques, both positive and negative. In the 1990s, she caused a stir by declaring that Chanel's iconic quilted handbag was "over". In response, Chanel took out a full-page advertisement in the International Herald Tribune refuting her claim. In 2008, she chastised Marc Jacobs for having delayed his runway show by two hours. She is also known for having fostered Nicolas Ghesquière as a fledgling designer, and for predicting the departure of Martin Margiela from Maison Martin Margiela.

In 2013, she held an auction at Christie's online, selling over 80 pieces from her personal wardrobe.

== Books ==
- How to be a Model, Suzy Menkes. Sphere, 1969, ISBN 0722160364
- Knitwear Revolution: Designer Patterns to Make, Suzy Menkes. Penguin USA, 1985. ISBN 0-14-046695-9
- The Windsor Style, Suzy Menkes. Salem House, 1987. ISBN 0-246-13212-4
- The Royal Jewels, Suzy Menkes. Contemporary Books, 1990. ISBN 0-8092-4315-6.
- Queen and Country, Suzy Menkes. HarperCollins, 1993. ISBN 0-246-13676-6
- Hussein Chalayan, Hussein Chalayan, Caroline Evans, Suzy Menkes. NAI, 2005. ISBN 90-5662-443-1
- Manolos new's shoes, Suzy Menkes. Thames &Hudson Ltd, 2010
- Fashion Antwerp Academy 50, Suzy Menkes.Lannoo, 2013
- The Fashion World of Jean Paul Gaultier: From the Sidewalk to the Catwalk, Suzy Menkes.Harry N.Abrams, 2001
- Jazz Age Fashion: Dressed to Kill, Suzy Menkes, Daisy Bates, Virginia Bates. Rizzoli, 2013.
- XL-FASHION DESIGNERS A-Z, Steele, Valerie, Suzy Menkes. Taschen, 2013.
- XL-FASHION DESIGNERS A-Z MISSO, Steele, Valerie, Suzy Menkes. Taschen, 2013.
- XL-FASHION DESIGNERS A-Z PRADA, Steele, Valerie, Suzy Menkes.Taschen, 2012.
- XL- FASHION DESIGNERS A-Z AKR, Steele, Valerie, Suzy Menkes.Taschen, 2012.
- XL-FASHION DESIGNERS A-Z ETRO, Steele, Valerie, Suzy Menkes.Taschen, 2012.
- XL-FASHION DESIGNERS A-Z STELL, Steele, Valerie, Suzy Menkes. Taschen, 2012
- Valentino, Matt Tyrnauer, Suzy Menkes.Taschen, 2009
- Dolls for the Princesses: The Story of France And Marianne, Suzy Menkes, Faith Eaton. Royal Collection Enterprises, 2005
