= Fashion Aid =

1985 benefit concert that features fashion

- Genre: Fashion
- Dates: 5 November 1985; 40 years ago
- Locations: Royal Albert Hall in London, England, United Kingdom
- Years active: 1985
- Founders: Bob Geldof
- Website: www.live8live.com

Fashion Aid was a single venue benefit concert held on 5 November 1985. The original event was organised by Bob Geldof as part of Live Aid to raise funds for relief of the ongoing Ethiopian famine. Billed as the "largest gathering of fashion creatives in the UK", the event was held at the Royal Albert Hall in London, England, United Kingdom (attended by 5,500 people) . The music during the Jane Seymour and Freddie Mercury "wedding" ceremony is the famous Widor's Toccata (Symphony no. 5).

5 November 1985: Royal Albert Hall, London

6 November 1985: Palladium, New York City

== Background ==
Fashion Aid was the idea of student Fameed Khalique who created it as a part of his degree course whilst at North East London Polytechnic. He took the idea to Geldof and it became an alternate funding initiative following on from the success of [Live Aid] earlier in the same year. Fameed Khalique and Bob Geldof decided it would be an idea to bring together top artistic talent from the fashion world and the world of music to raise funds for Ethiopia. The event featured 35 hairdressers, 60 makeup artists, 120 dressers, 125 models and assorted celebrities from the entertainment world.

== Notable Appearances ==
Notable appearances for the event included Paula Yates (wife of event organiser Bob Geldof), UK Prime Minister Margaret Thatcher, actresses Jane Seymour and Anjelica Huston, models Jerry Hall and Grace Jones, singers Kate Bush, Boy George, Freddie Mercury, George Michael, Madonna, Ringo Starr, music groups Spandau Ballet and Madness and British designers Jasper Conran, Wendy Dagworthy, Jean Muir, Zandra Rhodes and Katharine Hamnett. The event also featured fashion designs from Calvin Klein, Giorgio Armani, Issey Miyake and Yves Saint Laurent.
