= Murray Arbeid =

English fashion designer; maker of dresses for Princess Diana

- Born: 30 May 1935; London, England
- Died: 22 August 2011 (aged 76); Suffolk, England
- Occupation: Fashion designer

Murray Arbeid (30 May 1935 – 22 August 2011) was a British fashion designer, known for his eveningwear. His notable clients included Princess Diana and Shirley Bassey. He once joked that if there were a Nobel Prize for creations in taffeta, he would have won it.

== Early life ==
Arbeid was born in London, the son of East Enders Jack and Ida Arbeid. Jack Arbeid was a diamond cutter who had inherited a jewellery business and most of the family's friends were in the 'rag trade' – wholesaling and retailing clothes. During the war, like many children in vulnerable areas, Murray Arbeid was evacuated to Cornwall to escape the Blitz. Returning to London with a Cornish accent, he attended Cosway Street School in Marylebone before studying at Regent Street Polytechnic (now University of Westminster), and then moving on to the London Institute of Fashion to learn pattern cutting.

== Career beginnings ==
His first job was with a garment house in Wigmore Street, close to Oxford Street, where he earned 28 shillings and sixpence a week. In 1952, he was apprenticed to Michael Sherard, a member of the elite Incorporated Society of London Fashion Designers and known for his occasion and evening wear. Joining the firm a year before the coronation of Queen Elizabeth meant Arbeid was thrown into a busy environment as Britain's high society ladies refurbished their wardrobes.

At Michael Sherard, Arbeid was taught by Mme Raymond, who had once been an apprentice of Madeleine Vionnet, and later the skilled dressmaker Alice Edwards – both of whom had impeccable Paris contacts as well as expertise. Edwards, in particular, helped Arbeid to develop his customer manner.

== Establishment of fashion house ==
Arbeid set up his own label when he was still in his mid 20s, renting space in George Street, close to Oxford Street. As his business prospered in the 1970s, he moved to Bond Street, sharing space with his partner the hat maker Frederick Fox. Later, Arbeid moved again – this time to the area round Sloane Square. Finally he would settle in Ebury Street, Belgravia.

His lavish ready-to-wear evening gowns – he didn't do wedding dresses or daywear – sold particularly well in the United States, with further markets in Japan, Germany and France. In the United States, his clients included Neiman Marcus, Saks Fifth Avenue and Lord & Taylor. Twice a year, he would cross the Atlantic with a trunk show to promote his collections to stores across the US.

In the UK, he had a substantial wholesale business, supplying gowns to major department stores such as Harrods and Harvey Nichols and small exclusive stores outside the capital. His typical client was older, moneyed and with a full calendar of engagements.

=== Royal clients ===
One of Arbeid's most prestigious clients was Princess Diana, who needed evening wear that had standout appeal and favoured British designers. Notable gowns include a star-embroidered blue strapless gown worn for dinner with the President of Greece in 1986, a black and red flamenco-style gown worn first to a film premiere, and a cream lace gown worn for a British Embassy dinner in Washington, D.C., with George and Barbara Bush during the 1986 official visit. These dresses – described by fellow royal gown designer Bruce Oldfield as "gorgeous loss leaders" – boosted Arbeid's reputation and won him many other clients, particularly in the US. Other famous wearers of Arbeid gowns included Queen Noor of Jordan, Shirley Bassey and Estée Lauder.

== Later life ==
After Norman Hartnell's death in 1979, Arbeid produced a guest collection for the fashion house. He retired from his business in 1992. He and his partner Frederick Fox lived in Suffolk, making rare visits to London for fashion events, such as the London College of Fashion graduation show. Arbeid was diagnosed with cancer in 2000 and given six months to live, proving the prognosis wrong by over a decade.
