= Caroline Charles =

British fashion designer

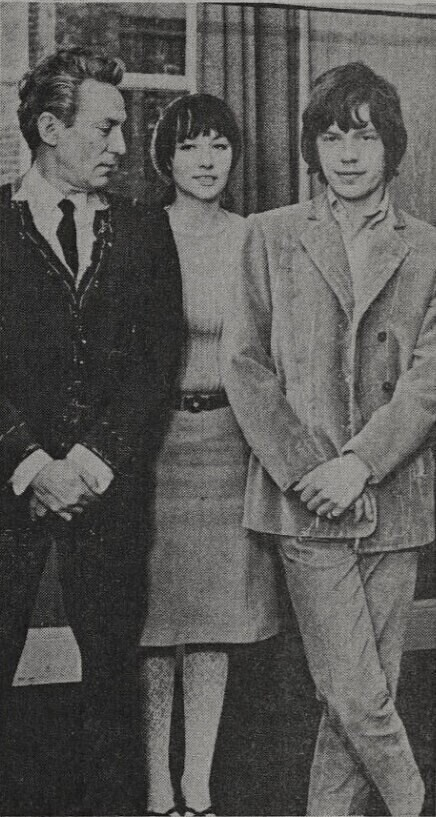
- Caroline Charles with Peter Finch and Mick Jagger c. early 1966
- Born: Caroline Mary Charles; 18 May 1942 (age 84); Cairo, Egypt
- Education: Swindon Art School
- Occupation: Fashion designer
- Title: Head Designer and CEO
- Children: 2

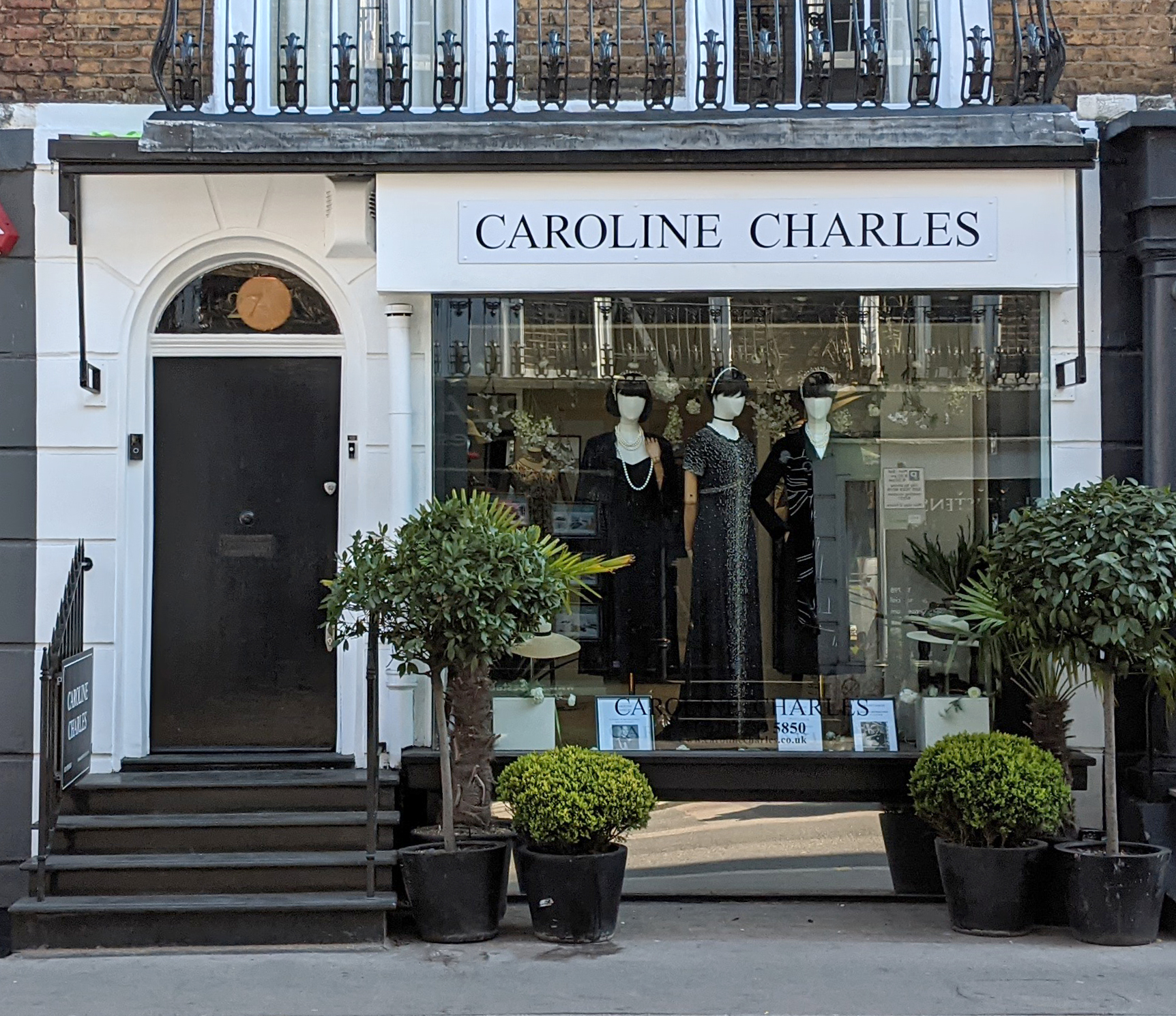
New shop location for Caroline Charles

Caroline Mary Charles OBE (born 18 May 1942) is a British fashion designer.

== Early life and education ==
Caroline Mary Charles was born on 18 May 1942, in Cairo, Egypt to British parents, Noel St. John Fairhurst and Helen T. Williams. From a young age she was interested in fashion. She left school at 16 and studied locally at Swindon Art School from 1958–60.

== Career ==
Charles did an apprenticeship at Michael Sherard's couture house, after which she worked with Mary Quant, and then worked for a year with the photographer Tony Rawlinson.

She started her Caroline Charles label in 1963, aged 21. Charles was one of the leading designers in the explosion of demand in the US during the 1960s for clothes from young British designers. She travelled widely with her Mod designs, visiting 36 cities and arranging fashion and pop shows, and appearing on television in the US and the UK, including the 23 November 1964 episode of To Tell the Truth, in which she was the person whom the celebrity panellists were attempting to identify. Two of the four panellists correctly selected Charles.

Her customers have included Mick Jagger, Ringo Starr, for both of whom she designed clothes, Marianne Faithfull, Diana, Princess of Wales, Cilla Black, Barbra Streisand, Cherie Blair, Anne Robinson, Helena Kennedy and Lesley Garrett. The actress Emma Thompson wore a green-beaded bodice and wide trousers by Caroline Charles, when receiving her Oscar for the 1992 film Howards End.

According to The Guardian, "The beautiful classic cut, high standard of manufacture and quality fabrics are the foundations upon which the label was built". Hilary Alexander, writing in The Daily Telegraph, called her "the thinking woman's designer". Charles was appointed OBE in June 2002. In 2012, her memoirs, Caroline Charles – 50 years in fashion were published.

As of 2017, the Caroline Charles label has stores in London, Cheltenham, Tunbridge Wells, Wilmslow and Exeter.

== Personal life ==
Charles lives in Knightsbridge, London. She was married to environmentalist Malcolm Valentine from 1960 until his death in 2016. They had a daughter and a son, Kate and Alex.
