= Kaffe Fassett =

American fashion designer

Kaffe Fassett MBE
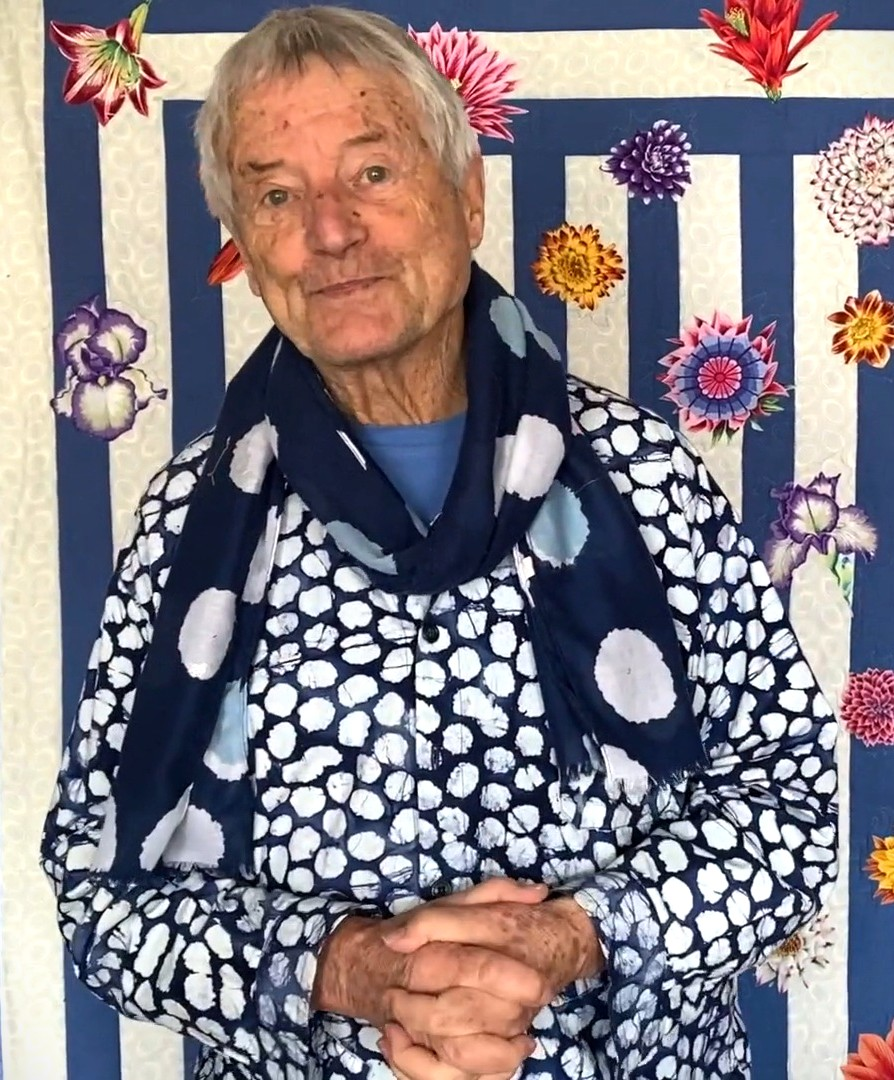
- Fassett for the Monterey Museum of Art in 2021
- Born: Frank Havrah Fassett; December 7, 1937 (age 88); San Francisco, California
- Known for: Textiles
- Spouse: Brandon Mably

Frank Havrah "Kaffe" Fassett, MBE (born December 7, 1937) is an American-born, British-based artist who is best known for his colourful designs in the decorative arts—needlepoint, patchwork, knitting, painting and ceramics. While still a child, Fassett renamed himself after an Egyptian boy character from the book Boy of the Pyramid by Ruth Fosdick Jones. His name rhymes with 'safe asset'.

== Early life ==
The second of five children, Fassett was born on December 7, 1937, in San Francisco, California, to parents William and Madeleine, who built the successful Nepenthe in Big Sur, California. He is the great-grandson of the wealthy businessman, lawyer and United States Congressman Jacob Sloat Fassett, and it was his great-great grandparents who founded the Crocker Art Museum in Sacramento, California. He received a scholarship to the School of the Museum of Fine Arts, Boston at the age of 19, but shortly left school to paint in London and moved there to live in 1964.

== Career ==
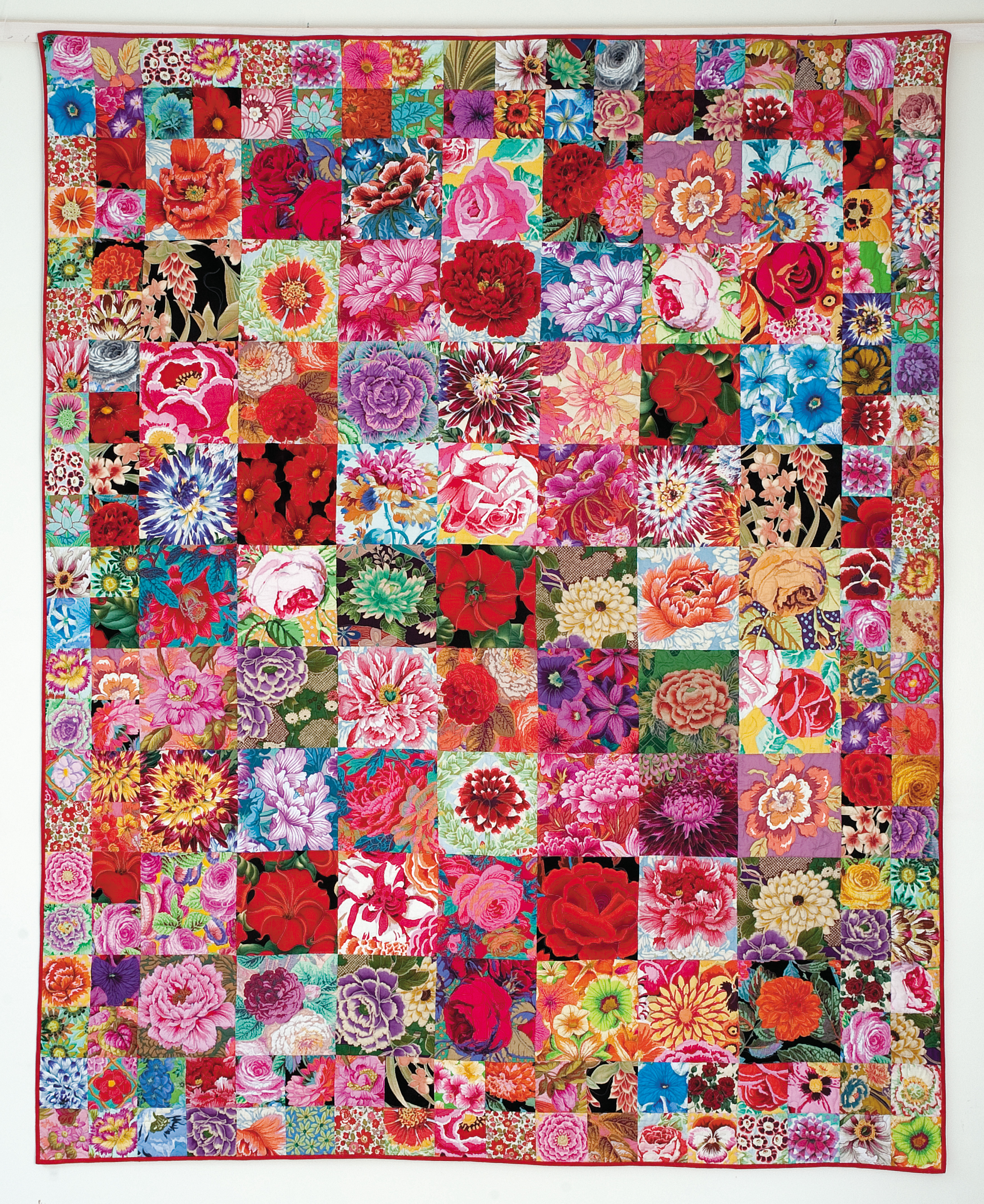
Seed Packet Quilt, Kaffe Fassett

In the late 1960s, Fassett met the Scottish fashion designer Bill Gibb. Until Gibb's premature death in 1988, they were very close friends and design collaborators, with Fassett creating many of the multicolored, complex knitwear designs that became one of Gibbs's trademarks. When one of Bill Gibb's designs was chosen by Beatrix Miller of Vogue as the 1970 Dress of the Year, the ensemble included a Fassett hand-knitted waistcoat, showing that traditional textile handicrafts had become an acceptable aspect of mainstream fashion. Fassett and Gibb worked together through to the end, collaborating on Gibb's final collection in 1985.

Fassett's work attracts a considerable following worldwide. His work was the subject of a 1988 one-man show at the Victoria & Albert Museum in London, the first time a living textile artist had such a show there. The show toured nine countries.

Being strongly concerned with colour and design, Fassett has also worked extensively in other textile arts. He was a supplier of tapestries to Women's Home Industries and its designer Beatrice Bellini, attracting a number of private commissions and creating tapestry kits for the company during the 1970s. He went on to design tapestry kits for Hugh Ehrman. Working as a team with his design partner and studio manager, Brandon Mably, has enabled Kaffe to design quilts, fabric, stage sets, and costumes for the Royal Shakespeare Company, while staying engaged in making rag rugs, knitting, tapestries, and mosaics.

Author of more than 40 books, Fassett concentrates on teaching the color and design stages of craftwork rather than the construction stage. In addition to books, he has hosted craft-related television and radio programmers for the BBC and Channel 4, including his own show, Glorious Colour.

His fabric prints are largely for the patchwork market along with Indian stripes fabric and shot cotton fabric range.

An exhibition of Fassett's quilts, knitting and needlepoint at the Mode museum Tassel, Belgium in 2007, followed a multimedia solo show in 2006 at the Prince Eugen's Waldemarsudde, Sweden. He made a workshop tour of Australia and New Zealand.

In 2013, Fassett followed up his 1988 exhibition at the Victoria & Albert Museum with 'Kaffe Fassett – A Life in Colour' at the Fashion and Textile Museum in London. The exhibit featured over 100 works including nine foot wide knitwear and throws, patchwork quilts, as well as items not seen before by the public. Fassett also designed a tactile installation for visitors to touch so that they would get a better understanding of the structure behind his work.

He is a fabric designer for Free Spirit Fabrics and a knitwear designer for Rowan Yarns.

Kaffe Fassett designed a shirt/shirting button collection which will be manufactured and distributed by Dill Button Company in February 2020.

== Personal life ==
Fassett has resided in England since 1964. He lives with and is married to Brandon Mably, his partner and studio manager.
