= Blue Rondo à la Turk (band) =

British band

- Origin: United Kingdom
- Genres: Pop, Latin jazz
- Years active: 1981–1984
- Labels: Virgin; Diable Noir
- Past members: Mark Reilly; Chris Sullivan; Moses Mount Bassie; Mick "Lloyd" Bynoe; Art Collins; Geraldo D'Arbilly; Kito Poncioni; Christos Tolera; Tholo Peter Tsegona; Daniel White

Blue Rondo à la Turk was an early 1980s British musical ensemble, whose music featured elements of salsa, pop and jazz. The group placed two songs on the UK Singles Chart (1981's "Me and Mr. Sanchez", and 1982's "Klactoveesedstein"), but is perhaps better known in retrospect for launching the careers of several players who went on to form Matt Bianco.

== History ==
=== Origin and early success (1981–1982) ===
Blue Rondo à la Turk was a floating collective of jazz and salsa oriented musicians, created by singer/lyricist Chris Sullivan who arrived in London from Merthyr Tydfil in the mid 1970s. His stated goal for the band was "to bring back show biz". In the band’s first interview, Sullivan said of their sound: “Call it Latin American jazz with funk and African leanings – plus a few others because all of us have adventurous musical tastes.” Sullivan co-wrote most of the band's original material; he also painted the distinctive cubist art that adorned most of the band's releases. The band was named after a song by Dave Brubeck.

For the earliest singles (1981's "Me and Mr. Sanchez", and 1982's "Klactoveesedstein"), the group was a six-piece: Sullivan, Christos Tolera (vocals), Mark Reilly (guitars), Mike Lloyd Bynoe a.k.a. "Choco Mick" (drums and timbales), Kito Poncioni (percussion) and Geraldo D'Arbilly (bass). All had assorted co-writing credits on the band's material, with Sullivan, Poncioni and Reilly being the most frequent contributors. Pete Wingfield produced "Me and Mr. Sanchez", which entered the UK Singles Chart on 14 November 1981, peaking at number 40 and reached number 68 in Australia. An early gig took place at the Blue Note in Derby that same month. "Me and Mr. Sanchez" was also number one in Brazil for three months and was the theme tune for the 1982 World Cup.

The band's follow-up single "Klactoveesedstein" was produced by Kevin Godley & Lol Creme, and entered the chart on 13 March 1982, reaching number 50.

The group added Moses Mount Bassie (saxophone) as a member for their third single, "The Heavens Are Crying", written by the band with Clive Langer. This track was produced by Langer and Alan Winstanley, and failed to chart. The fourth single, recorded with the same line-up, was called "Carioca", and featured a co-writing credit for soon-to-be-official member Daniel White. Produced by Mike Chapman, this single peaked at number 143 .

Blue Rondo à la Turk's debut album, Chewing the Fat, was released in 1982 and included all four of their singles released to that time. Added to the line up for the album, officially swelling the group to a ten-piece, were Art Collins (saxophone), Tholo Peter Tsegona (trumpet), and Daniel White (keyboards). Chewing the Fat appeared on the UK Albums Chart, entering on 6 November 1982 and remaining on the chart for two weeks peaking at 80 on the second week.

=== Line-up changes, second album, and dissolution (1983–1984) ===
Following the release of the debut album and its minimal chart success, Blue Rondo à la Turk fractured, with Reilly, Poncioni and White exiting to found the soon-to-be-chartbound group Matt Bianco. Collins, Tsegona, Mount Bassie and Bynoe also dropped out around this time, leaving the group a trio: vocalists Sullivan and Tolera, and percussionist D'Arbilly.

The slimmed down group also slimmed down their name to simply Blue Rondo, and issued two non-charting singles: "Slipping Into Daylight" (1983), and "Masked Moods" (1984). Both were written by Sullivan with outside collaborators, and produced by Steve Brown.

Both singles were included on the Blue Rondo album Bees Knees and Chicken Elbows, which was released in 1984 — by which time the band had already broken up.

== Reissues ==
After the success of Matt Bianco, Virgin Records issued the 1986 compilation Too Soon To Come, credited to "Blue Rondo à la Turk Featuring Mark Reilly & Danny White". The compilation featured all 6 Blue Rondo UK singles (even the ones that Reilly and/or White didn't play on), as well as assorted album tracks. The release was only made available on LP.

On 16 June 2014 a double-CD entitled Chewing the Fat was issued by Cherry Red Records, under number: CDBRED621 (ASIN: B00JVSIGJY). The two cds include 29 tracks, comprising all of the group's recordings on the original album plus various bonus tracks, 7" and 12" specials and some remixes.
