= Browns (fashion boutique) =

British fashion boutique

Coordinates: 51°30′50″N 0°8′55.03″W

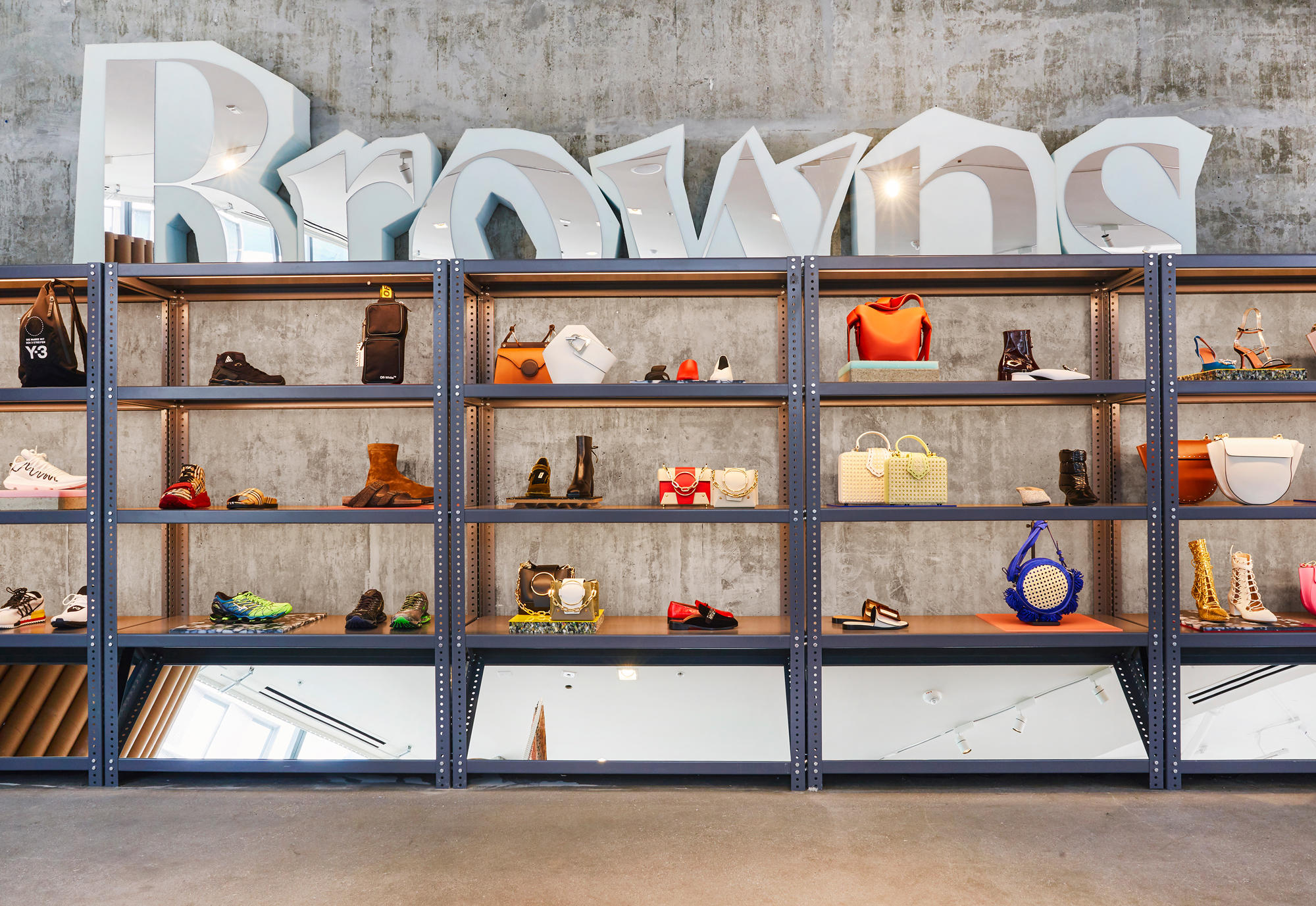
- Type: Private
- Industry: Luxury Fashion
- Founded: 1970; 56 years ago
- Founder: Joan & Sidney Burstein
- Products: Luxury Fashion, Fine Jewellery
- Services: Retail, beauty and hospitality
- Owner: Coupang
- Parent: Farfetch
- Website: brownsfashion.com

Browns Fashion is a London-based brand founded in 1970 by Joan Burstein and her husband Sidney. Browns was instrumental in launching brands such as Alexander McQueen, John Galliano, Ralph Lauren, and Calvin Klein in the UK market. The brand and its flagship boutique was acquired by Farfetch in 2015. The boutique, housed within a Grade II listed building at 39 Brook Street in Mayfair, is the destination for a full experience of fashion, fine jewellery and plant based food by Alexis Gauthier.

== History ==
Joan Burstein founded Browns with her husband Sidney in 1970. Initially a small boutique housed on the ground floor at 27 South Molton Street, Browns grew rapidly expanding through five connecting Georgian townhouses. Their daughter Caroline Burstein founded Molton Brown before joining Browns as creative director in 1993. Their son Simon Burstein became CEO.

Known for discovering John Galliano, Alexander McQueen, Hussein Chalayan, and Christopher Kane, it also brought designers such as Calvin Klein, Sabine G., Armani, Ralph Lauren and Jil Sander to London. Browns has continued to support both young and established fashion designers.

In 2006, Joan Burstein (known in the fashion industry as Mrs B) received a CBE in the Queen’s Birthday Honours List for services to fashion. Sidney Burstein died in April 2010.

In May 2015, Browns passed from family ownership when it was acquired by the fashion website Farfetch. Joan Burstein stayed on as honorary chair and her son and daughter Simon and Caroline retained seats on the board.

== Stores ==
Browns moved from South Molton Street to 39 Brook Street in Mayfair, London. It also operated Browns East at 21 Club Row in East London which operated from October 2017 before closing September 2022.

=== Pop-up retail ===
Browns had a pop-up shop in Los Angeles at the Fred Segal flagship on Sunset Boulevard for eight weeks in 2018. Browns took over an abandoned supermarket in the Mitte borough of Berlin for three days in November 2019.
