= South Molton Street =

Street in Mayfair, London

Coordinates: 51°30′49″N 0°8′52″W

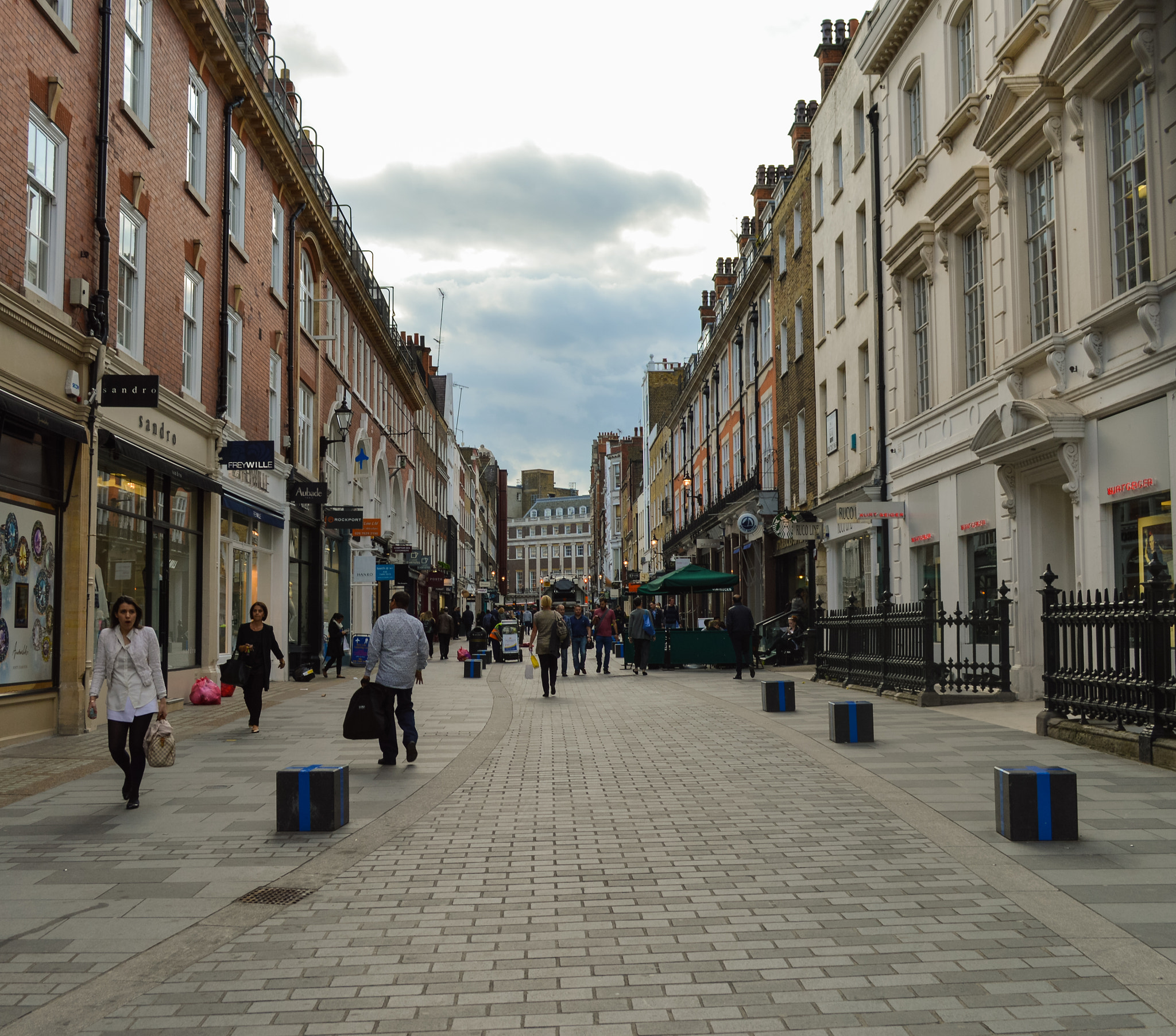
South Molton Street in 2014, facing towards Oxford Street

South Molton Street is a street in Mayfair, London, that runs from Oxford Street to Brook Street. Bond Street Underground station is at the north end of the street.

The street was built in the mid-18th century as part of the Conduit Mead Estate. It was extensively rebuilt around 1900, but many of the original Georgian houses remain. It is now pedestrianised and contains many shops selling items such as women's fashion and jewellery.

== Famous residents ==
- Ernest Bevin lived in a flat at number 34 for twenty years from 1931.
- William Blake lived in a flat at number 17 in 1803.
