= Prudence Glynn =

British fashion journalist and author

The Right Honourable The Lady Windlesham
- Portrait by Deirdre Daines
- Born: Prudence Loveday Glynn; 22 January 1935; Kensington, London
- Died: 24 September 1986 (aged 51); Kensington, London
- Other name: Prudence Hennessy
- Occupations: Fashion editor; author
- Notable credit: Fellow of the Royal Society of Arts (1974)
- Spouse: David Hennessy, 3rd Baron Windlesham (m. 1965)

Prudence Loveday Glynn, Baroness Windlesham (22 January 1935 – 24 September 1986), was a British fashion journalist and author, best known for her long-running role as the first fashion editor of The Times.

During her 15 years presiding over the fashion pages of one of the UK's leading national newspapers, she charted huge changes in the fashion scene as it moved from couture formality to young Swinging London designers and the rise of high-street brands. She championed new designers and was an influential commentator about the way the industry operated, also holding a number of advisory roles outside journalism.

Glynn – known as Lady Windlesham in private life – was a formidable character. Her obituary in The Times described her as a figure who was "feared and respected rather than loved". A response a few days later in The Times, from her former secretary and assistant Sandra Barwick presented a different perspective. Barwick described Glynn as unfailingly kind and generous and added: "She was profoundly bored by the pompous and splendidly contemptuous of received opinion – an unusual characteristic in a fashion editor."

== Early life and career ==
Prudence Loveday Glynn was the youngest of four children born to retired army officer Lieutenant-Colonel Rupert Trevor Wallace Glynn and Evelyn Margaret Glynn (née Vernet). She grew up in Tetsworth, Oxfordshire and was educated at The Downs School, Seaford, Sussex.

Glynn left school and went straight into a job in advertising. Her first foray into the world of fashion was working for the eveningwear house of Frank Usher. From there, she moved into journalism, writing for women's magazines and then becoming fashion editor of Woman's Mirror. This was part of a new crop of magazines featuring fashion targeting a younger audience. At Woman's Mirror, Glynn was one of the first to feature Twiggy (Queen had turned the aspiring model down). Although Glynn considered Twiggy too small for regular fashion features, she did use her for head shots.

In 1965, Glynn married the Conservative Party politician and Anglo-Irish peer David Hennessy (the 3rd Baron Windlesham), who later became managing director of the ATV television broadcaster.

== Appointment to The Times ==
Glynn was recruited to The Times in 1966. Then editor William Haley was working to broaden the paper's image and had appointed Susanne Puddefoot to supervise a new daily women's page. Implicit in her brief was to make the paper more attractive to female readers, previously provided with occasional home cooking tips and Bond Street fashion. It was she who recruited Glynn as the paper's first fashion editor. The first page authored by Glynn appeared on 3 May 1966. In 1967, new Times editor William Rees-Mogg introduced journalist bylines and from that point Glynn became a known fashion name.

=== Writing style ===
Glynn was witty, sometimes acerbic, and her critics felt she didn't treat the world of fashion as seriously as she should. It was reported that many people read her pages not because they were interested in clothes but because they enjoyed her commentary. However, her prose was widely respected – it was a standing joke on the paper that her sentences were even longer than those of Bernard Levin.

She often brought humour into the fashion pages. Describing the fashion challenge created by the variable British summer weather in 1966, she recommended the new fashion for transparent plastic macs: "One solution to the problem of finding yourself dressed like a trawler skipper under a cloudless sky is to buy a waterproof coat that looks just like an ordinary coat, but the fabrics in which these are usually made make them much more suitable for winter than summer. The newest solution to the sun/rain transition is the crystal clear cover up...If you find their faintly ectoplasmic look a little eerie, they share the same quality of melting into the background too."

Glynn – who was herself married to a peer of the realm – sometimes poked fun at British tradition. Writing of the perils of dressing for the summer race and garden party season, she described the problem with investing in 'occasion outfits': "Look at the photographs taken at the Derby. The weather couldn't have been more unpromising, yet there were the British ladies staunchly parading the British Special Occasion Outfit (Subsection: Race Meetings) – Sling back shoes, wind-torn Bretons clapped onto untidy damp hair, nodding and smiling away under tons of artificial pansies and draped tulle...So now, as millions all over the country are feverishly stitching a million flower petals onto a thousand flowered hats, this is a last plea for self control."

=== Influence on British fashion ===
Glynn was a vociferous supporter of homegrown fashion talent and promoted many of the new designers emerging in the 1960s. In particular, she supported Jean Muir and was a champion of Ossie Clark; she attended Clark's first fashion show in 1966, chose his silk trouser suit with Celia Birtwell print for the Dress of the Year award in 1968 and regarded him as one of the brightest talents the UK had ever produced. Later, she would publicise new budget Swinging London brands, such as Stirling Cooper and predicted in Marrian-McDonnell the rise of the 'edited' boutique brand, geared to the particular needs and tastes of a clearly identifiable target customer.

In her articles, Glynn frequently reported on the state of the British fashion industry – sometimes criticising British officialdom for not recognising the value of its brands. Commenting on a British export drive to Tokyo in 1969, in which a variety of British industries were being showcased, she highlighted a lack of research into the Japanese market, adding: "talking to relevant officials in our consulates abroad confirms my gloomy view of too many of our export tactics". Her commentary on the key issues facing designers and manufacturers helped to raise the profile of British fashion and led on to a variety of government initiatives.

She believed the future of British fashion's reputation lay in its emerging talent, urging the Clothing Export Council – then largely funded by mainstream clothing and textile manufacturers – to remember what she described as "laboratory fashion". She added: "Having spent so much time trying to get designers together with manufacturers I have only just come back to the memory that postwar French haute couture dominance was founded on ideas not dominance. Nobody asked Givenchy to make 600 dozen of a style by March."

Her influence spread beyond the UK; she secured a rare interview with Cristóbal Balenciaga in 1971. It was only the second – and also the last – interview of his life.

== Other roles ==
Although she was influential and respected as a fashion commentator, Glynn did not always see eye-to-eye with colleagues at The Times and she was moved from the role of fashion editor to weekly columnist. In her first column, entitled 'Fourteen years, and positively no regrets', she opened by saying: "Confronted the other day by a heckle to the effect that I had 'wasted 14 years by only writing about hideous clothes costing ludicrous money for silly women to wear at silly occasions' I naturally took this as a great compliment". In the year before her death, she began writing for The Guardian.

Outside journalism, Glynn held a number of advisory roles. She was a member of the council of the Royal College of Art (1966–1977) and the Design Council (1973–79). She joined the Council for National Academic Awards committee for art and design in 1972 and became a member of the Crafts Council (1977–1980). She was elected fellow of the RSA in 1974. From 1981, she was a trustee of the Museum of London.

=== Books and TV ===
Glynn published two books on fashion, Fashion: Dress in the Twentieth Century (1978) and Skin to Skin: Eroticism in Dress (1982). During the 1970s, she appeared in a number of TV programmes about British fashion.

== Later years ==
Prudence Glynn had a series of health problems that affected her later career. She was legally separated from her husband at the time of her death, from a brain haemorrhage, at St Charles Hospital, Kensington. She was 51.
