= Topshop =

British clothing retailer

- Type: Subsidiary
- Industry: Retail; Fashion
- Predecessor: Peter Robinson's Top Shop; Top Shop
- Founded: 1964; 62 years ago (Sheffield)
- Fate: Administration; Acquired by ASOS in 2021, converted to online-only
- Headquarters: London, England
- Number of locations: Over 510 shops across 58 countries (closed)
- Area served: Europe; North America; South America; Middle East and North Africa; South Africa; Central Asia; Southeast Asia
- Key people: Ian Grabiner (CEO); Mary Homer (Managing director)
- Products: Clothing; Shoes; Accessories; Cosmetics
- Owner: Bestseller A/S (75%); ASOS (25%)
- Website: topshop.com/gb/topshop

Topshop (stylised in all caps; originally Top Shop) is a British online fast-fashion retailer, which specialises in women's clothing, shoes and accessories. Since 2024, it is majority owned by Danish company Bestseller and part owned by ASOS.

Previously, it was part of the Arcadia Group, controlled by Sir Philip Green, but went into administration in late 2020 before being purchased by ASOS on 1 February 2021. It previously had approximately 510 shops worldwide, but closed all of its physical locations and operated solely via online retail from 2020 to 2025.

It returned to physical retail in February 2026 in select John Lewis stores, and on 21 August 2026, at McElhinney's Department Store in Ballybofey, Ireland.

== History ==
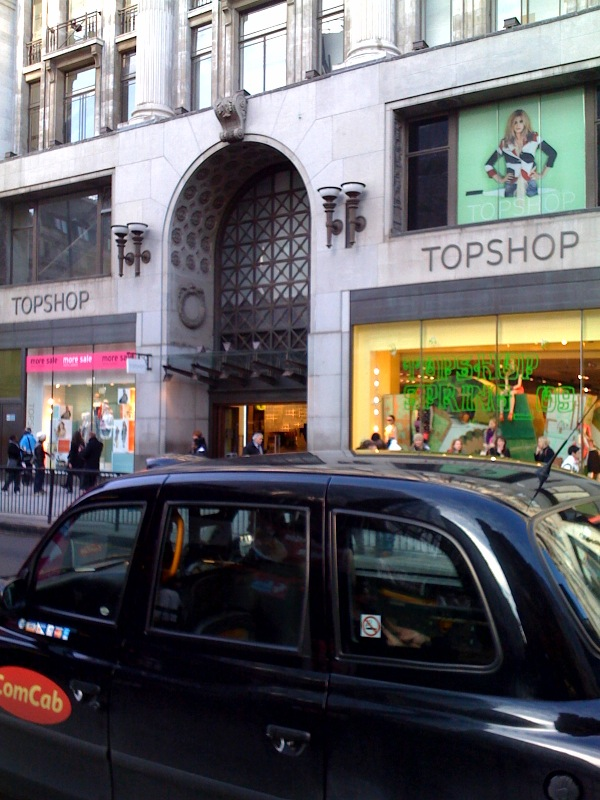
Topshop's former flagship shop in Oxford Street, London

=== 1960s–1970s ===
Topshop started as a brand extension of the department store Peter Robinson in the 1960s and originally sold fashion by young British designers, such as Mary Quant and Stirling Cooper. Peter Robinson was a women's fashion chain that had been acquired by Burton in 1946. Topshop was founded in 1964 as Peter Robinson's Top Shop, a youth brand within the Sheffield branch and also had a large department in the Oxford Street shop. This was high fashion for the "young and different generation" as The Times put it in 1965, and the department stocked garments by names such as Mary Quant and Gerald McCann. By 1966, it had a branch in the Peter Robinson store in Norwich.

Peter Robinson's Top Shop buyer Diane Wadey had an eye for young talent and introduced Royal College of Art graduate Jane Whiteside to Jeff Cooper and Ronnie Stirling. The Stirling Cooper brand they created soon had its own sections in Top Shop shops in London and Sheffield, as well as being stocked in Peter Robinson stores in Norwich and Bristol. Other brands stocked at Top Shop included Jeff Banks, French Connection and Radley Cooper.

In 1973, parent company Burton Group launched a major expansion of its womenswear division, splitting Top Shop by Peter Robinson into two chains to be known as Peter Robinson and Top Shop. It was announced that while Peter Robinson would target the over 25s market, Top Shop would focus on the age range from 13 to 24, with Ralph Halpern directing the new venture. By 1974, Peter Robinson had been reduced from 22 stores to six, while Top Shop was developing independently (still retaining the one co-branded shop in Oxford Street) and was described as "highly profitable". Its key retail rivals included Miss Selfridge and the Way In boutique arm of Harrods. Within two years, Top Shop had 55 standalone branches, with more to come according to an article in The Times. Fashion editor Prudence Glynn described it as having a: "sharp definition of purpose". It made profits of £1m that year. By 1978, Top Shop accounted for a third of Burton's operating profits.

Also in 1978, Burton embarked on a drive to win a larger share of the men's fashion market in the midst of declining sales of men's tailoring, launching the Topman brand along similar lines to its women's retail arm. It was described by an executive as: "more of a 'brother to Top Shop than a son of Burton'." The following year, Burton announced sales and profits up by 30 per cent in womenswear, with Topman also being cited as highly profitable. By the start of the 1980s, the brand was being referred to as Topshop.

=== 1980s–2010s ===
In the 1980s, Topshop struggled to maintain its profile as a fashion brand, but by the late 1990s it began undergoing a revival. In 1994, it launched a collection with Red or Dead. It continued to work with designer talent, such as former Clements Ribeiro assistant Markus Lupfer – described in 1999 as "so hot he's practically steaming" – also working with, among others, Hussein Chalayan, Tristan Webber and Tracey Boyd. Typically, such ranges sold out quickly, and attracted column inches in the fashion press.

The brand pioneered online fashion, launching UK's first online fashion store for Topshop This turnaround is often credited to the promotion of Jane Shepherdson as brand director. Having begun her career as a buyer, she rose through the ranks at the company. When she took on brand direction, Topshop had an annual profit of £9 million; by 2005 it was making over £100 million annually.

In May 2007, British supermodel Kate Moss, designed her first collection for the brand. The appointment of Moss was announced just before the departure of Shepherdson for Whistles. In the same year, artist Stella Vine designed a limited edition range inspired by her artworks. These included T-shirts, vest tops, and T-shirt dresses, with the labels designed in pink glitter. The Guardian commented that "the fact that the range of T-shirts she has recently designed for TopShop – emblazoned with slogans like Breaking Up With Her Boyfriend – are flying out, speaks volumes for her public support."

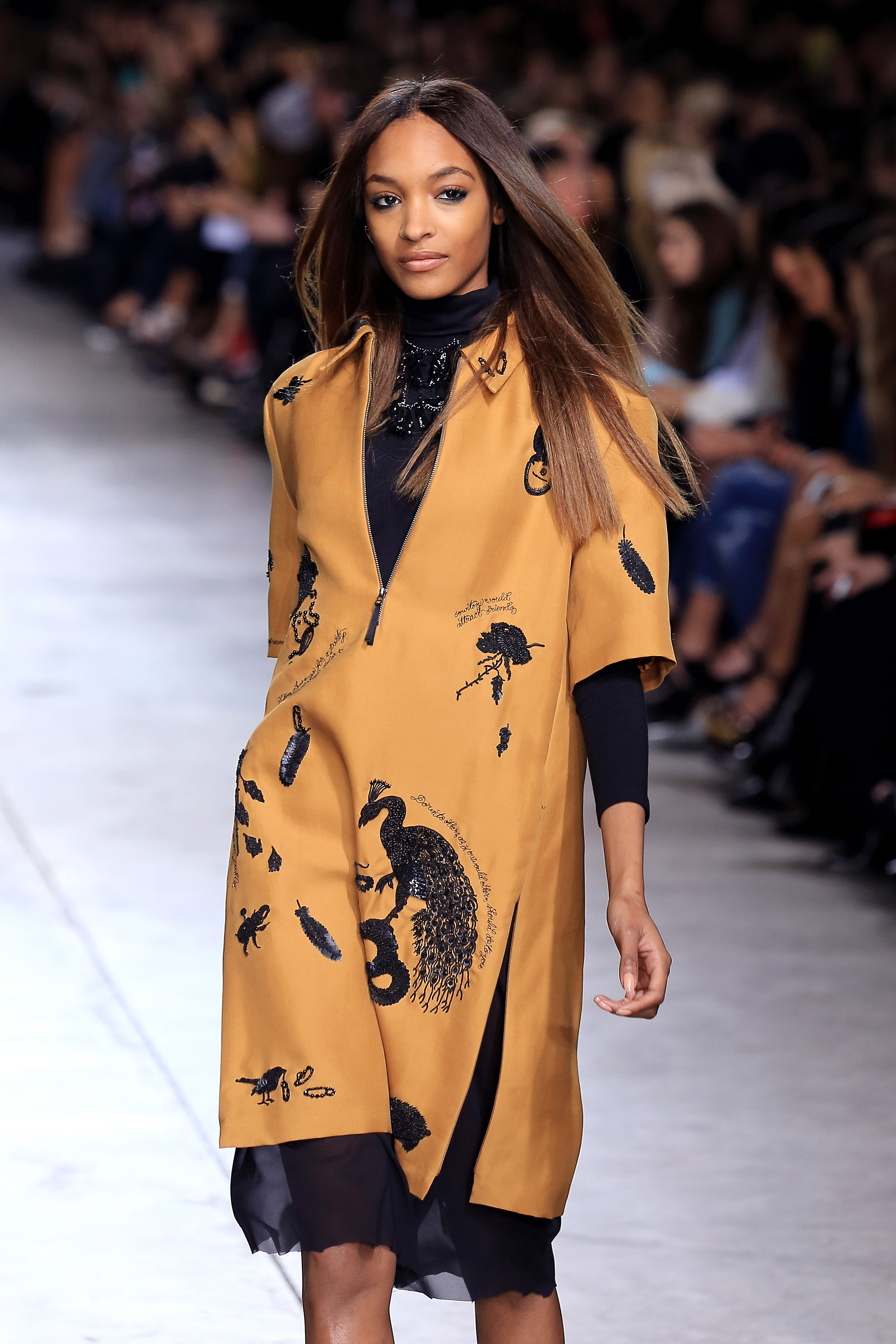
Jourdan Dunn at the 2009 London Fashion Week Topshop show.

Under her tenure, Topshop became a key sponsor of London Fashion Week, sponsoring its Newgen arm that supports emerging British designers from 2002 and the Fashion East initiative – which acts as a bridge between London's fashion colleges and the Newgen scheme – a year later. This sponsorship continues and since 2005 it has been part of the London Fashion Week catwalk schedule.

In December 2012, Philip Green sold a 25% stake in Topshop and Topman to the US-based private equity group Leonard Green and Partners for US$805 million. Under the terms of the deal, Arcadia retained Topshop's flagship Oxford Street shop (said to be worth between £400 and £500 million). Green said that the deal would enable Topshop to speed up its expansion, particularly within the US.

In 2014, Beyoncé signed a deal to launch an activewear brand with Topshop. The 50-50 venture was initially called Parkwood Topshop Athletic Ltd and was scheduled to launch its first dance, fitness and sports ranges in autumn 2015. In November 2015, it was revealed that the brand would launch in April 2016. The brand was later revealed to be called Ivy Park.

In 2015, Topshop started collaborating with the online retailer Zalando and began selling their merchandise in their shops. Advertisements featuring model Cara Delevingne were broadcast in Germany, Switzerland and France.

=== Administration ===
Arcadia Group went into administration at 8pm GMT on 30 November 2020. All of its physical shops were closed.

On 25 January 2021, ASOS said it was in "exclusive" talks to buy Arcadia's Topshop, Topman, Miss Selfridge and HIIT brands out of administration, though it only wanted the brands, not the shops. A consortium including Next had earlier dropped a bid to buy Topshop and Topman; interest in Arcadia operations had also been expressed by Mike Ashley's Frasers Group, a consortium including JD Sports, and online retailer Boohoo.

On 1 February 2021, ASOS announced it had acquired the Topshop, Topman, Miss Selfridge and HIIT brands out of administration for £265 million, paying an additional £65 million for current and pre-ordered stock. ASOS will keep 300 employees on as part of the deal but will not keep any of the brand's stores, putting 2,500 jobs at risk. In July 2021, it was announced that Nordstrom had acquired an unspecified minority stake in the Topshop Topman, Miss Selfridge and HIIT businesses from ASOS, with the intention of selling the brands online and instore across North America.

On 5 September 2024, ASOS announced that it sold a 75% stake of Topshop & Topman to the Danish company Bestseller. It was announced that the Topshop & Topman websites would relaunch within 6 months of the deal with Bestseller, as well it was hinted that the brands could return to the high street with stores, the chief executive of ASOS commented "We might open stores. We will consider it for sure but we have no specific agreement to open a certain number".

On 22 July 2025, it was announced that Topshop's products would be available to buy from a physical shop for the first time in five years, at McElhinney's Department Store in Ballybofey, Ireland.

Through a national partnership from February 2026, Topshop will be available in 32 John Lewis stores while Topman will be on offer in six.

== International operations and franchises ==
Topshop had around 510 shops including those that are franchised; over 300 shops were located in the UK. It had operated across 37 countries and via online operations in several markets.

Topshop expanded into Singapore in 2000 with an outlet opening at Orchard Road.

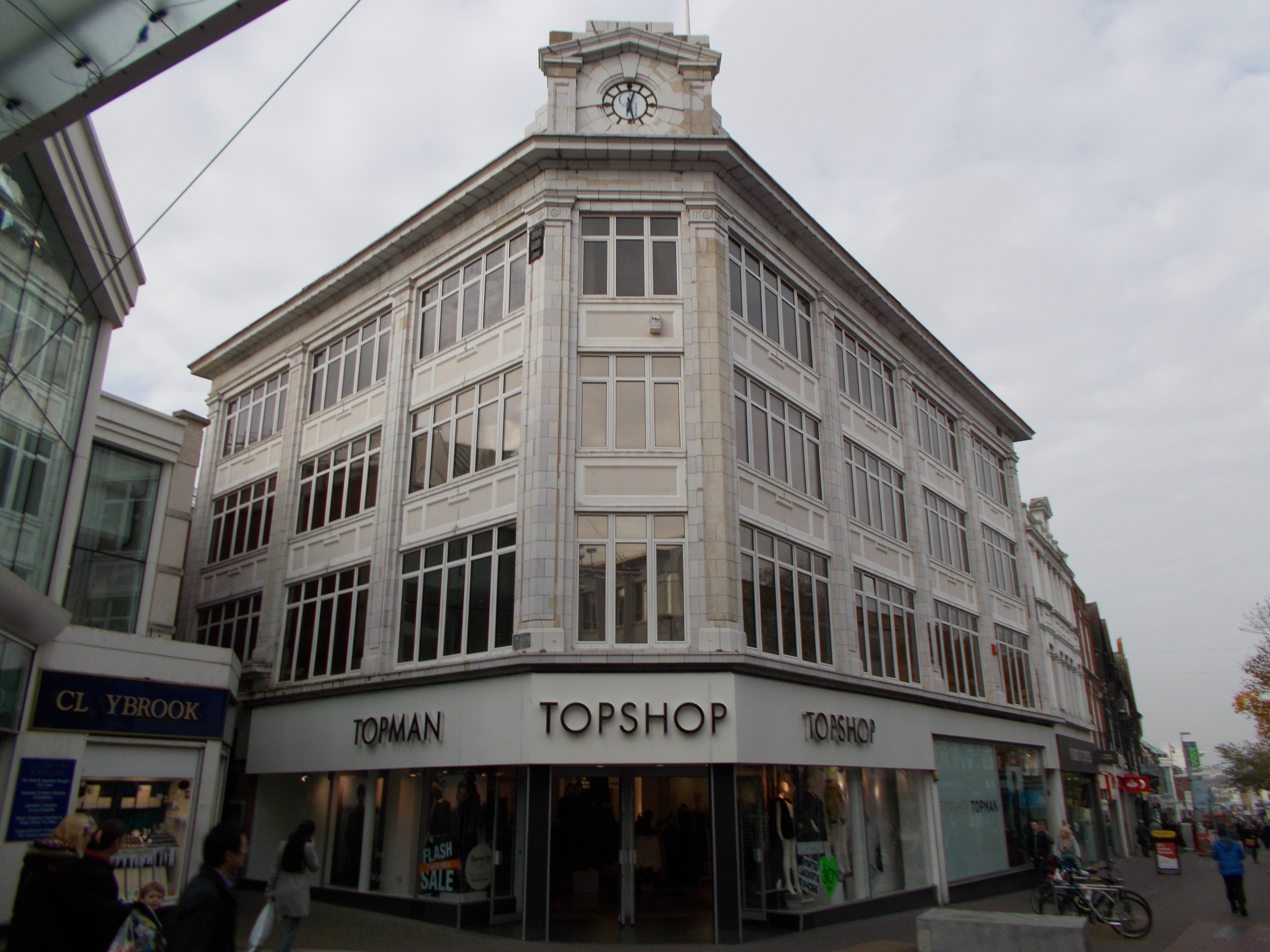
A branch of Topshop in Sutton High Street, Sutton, London

Topshop began planning its expansion to the United States in the mid-2000s and was tipped to open in New York as early as 2007. Currently it operates via a website and sells in Nordstrom shops. A small number of wholly owned shops were located in major cities. On 5 November 2014 it opened a flagship shop in New York City, located on Fifth Avenue. The shop was the largest international site, and second only to the Oxford Street, London shop in square footage. This was its second shop in New York City, the first having opened on Broadway in 2009. On 23 May 2019, Arcadia filed for Chapter 15 bankruptcy in the United States and announced that all 11 US freestanding Topshop stores would be liquidated and closed; however, Topshop would continue to sell its merchandise exclusively at Nordstrom locations.

Topshop expanded into New Zealand in 2010, opening a small concession within a department store. Located on Auckland's Queen Street, the flagship shop sold out of some of its ranges before it had opened. In September 2017, the franchise went into receivership and both shops closed on 28 September 2017.

Topshop announced a five-year international expansion plan in early 2011, planning to open new shops across Asia, Australia and the US as well as seeking opportunities in Europe. Although the Japanese flagship shops launched in 2006, all 5 shops in Japan shut in 2015. In 2013, parent group Arcadia began stepping up its franchise deals, announcing a planned 150 new shop openings with partners in Canada, Australia and Vietnam, to include Topshop and Topman shops.

Topshop expanded into Australia in 2011, with shops in New South Wales and Victoria. In 2013 it opened a shop in Brisbane's CBD in a location previously occupied by Borders. However, in mid-2017 Topshop's Australian operations went into voluntary administration. By mid 2019, only Sydney's Market Street store remained opened, after the closure of stores at Westfield Bondi Junction and Melbourne's Emporium earlier in the year. In March 2020 Topshop closed its final Australian store, 11 years after its initial launch.

In November 2012, Topshop launched its first shop in South Africa. In April 2013 a Topshop-Topman shop launched in Cape Town, at the V&A Waterfront. On 24 October 2013, Topshop opened a concession at Galeries Lafayette in Paris, its first outlet in France.

In 2015, Topshop opened a flagship shop in Auckland and 10 months later a shop in Wellington. Located on Auckland's Queen Street, the flagship shop sold out of some of its ranges before it had opened. In September 2017, the franchise went into receivership and both shops closed on 28 September 2017.

On 17 September 2020, all of Topshop's outlets in Singapore were closed down, citing losses.

Topshop was acquired by ASOS in February 2021. Its physical shops around the world were closed shortly thereafter.

=== UK flagship stores ===
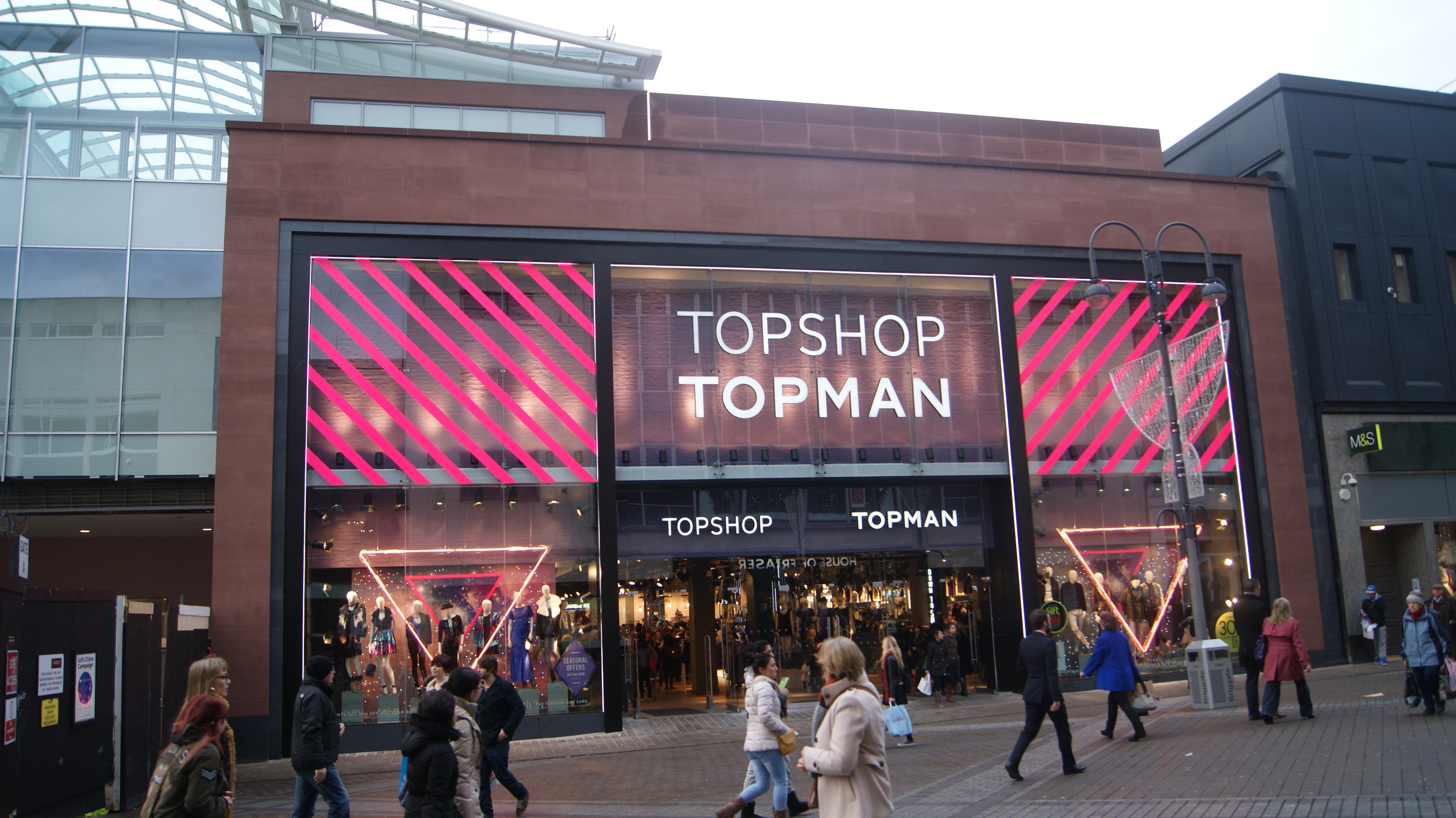
The Briggate, Leeds branch of Topshop was the third largest branch in the UK

- Oxford Circus, London – The flagship Topshop shop in the UK was 90,000 square feet (8,400 m^{2}), covered five floors and attracted an average of 28,000 customers each day. In May 2019, Arcadia Group confirmed it planned to close multiple stores, including Topshop's flagship store on London's Oxford Street.
- Fifth Avenue, New York City – The Topshop shop, which opened in November 2014, was located opposite Saks Fifth Avenue and comprised 40,000 square feet (3,700 m^{2}) of retail space.
- Liverpool One, Liverpool – In 2009, Topshop opened its first Manhattan-style concept shop in the UK at Liverpool One. The site provides 60,000 square feet (5,600 m^{2}) of retail area and includes a Topman, hair salon and two shoe shops alongside the Topshop branch.
- Briggate, Leeds – In 2012, a 31,000 square feet (2,900 m^{2}) shop on Briggate opened, becoming the third-largest Topshop in the UK. It is part of the Trinity Leeds shopping development.
- Victoria Square, Belfast – In 2008 Topshop Victoria Square, Belfast opened its doors as one of the largest shops in the new shopping centre development at 40,000 square feet (3,700 m^{2}); the largest Topshop in Northern Ireland.

== Protests and controversy ==
Topshop was criticised for its overseas sourcing policies and its tax arrangements. In December 2007, the Edinburgh branch was targeted by student campaigning network People & Planet for allegedly using cotton picked by "slave labour".

In December 2010, some 200 campaigners staged a sit-in that closed Topshop's Oxford Circus shop, and in Brighton a number of protestors glued themselves to the branch windows. Other high streets in towns and cities across Britain saw similar protests in a day of action by UK Uncut against corporate tax arrangements. Two months later, police arrested a man for writing "pay your taxes" in washable ink on the wall of a Topshop branch in Colchester.

In July 2013, the singer Rihanna won a lawsuit against Topshop to prevent it using her image unofficially on a T-shirt. The lawsuit was launched on the premise that Topshop customers would assume Rihanna endorsed the company, that would lead to a false representation of her celebrity image and increased tensions with her then endorsement deal with River Island, a high-street rival. Judge Justice Birss agreed that customers would likely be deceived into believing it had the singer's approval. Topshop launched an appeal to the High Court, accusing Rihanna of wrongfully advocating that: "only a celebrity may ever market his or her own character" and Judge Justice Birss of misreading the law on "celebrity merchandising". The appeal was rejected unanimously at the Court of Appeal in London on 22 January 2015.

In July 2015, Topshop was criticised for its mannequins which some judged as too skinny. After a customer complained on Facebook, the fashion chain stopped using its tall and skinny female shop mannequins. It was also criticised in October 2018 for removing an in-store pop-up in its London flagship store that was used to promote feminism with publisher Penguin after only being up for 20 minutes. The fashion retailer had agreed to host the pop-up with Penguin, to help launch the book Feminists Don't Wear Pink (And Other Lies), written by Scarlett Curtis, with products for sale supporting the UN charity Girl Up.

In May 2016, the UVW union organised a large protest outside Topshop's Oxford Circus store attended by the Shadow Chancellor and Labour MP John McDonnell. It was the headlining event in a national "day of action" involving 16 other Topshop stores around the country, supported by various trade unions and activist groups, calling for the Living Wage and dignified treatment of outsourced cleaners being victimised for trade union activity.
