= Economic impact of the COVID-19 pandemic in the Republic of Ireland =

The COVID-19 pandemic has had a deep impact on the Irish economy, leading it into a recession. Essential public health measures announced by the Irish Government to contain the spread of COVID-19 resulted in the largest monthly increase in unemployment in the history of the Republic of Ireland during March 2020. By 24 April, there were more than one million people in receipt of support interventions to the labour market, including those in receipt of the COVID-19 Pandemic Unemployment Payment and the COVID-19 Temporary Wage Subsidy Scheme. While there were job losses in all sectors, individuals working in tourism, hospitality, food and retail have seen the largest job losses.

== Agriculture ==
In late-March 2020, all marts were shut as part of measures introduced to combat the spread of COVID-19. However, Minister for Agriculture, Food and the Marine Michael Creed said the Department of Agriculture, Food and the Marine would permit livestock marts to reopen for limited reasons if social distancing could be adhered to. Thus, another first for Ireland, a virtual mart occurring in County Meath, and prompted by pandemic restrictions on social gatherings. Irish agri-software company, Livestock-Live (based in Mullingar), provided the live streaming technology to facilitate the online bidding of farmers, having first introduced its cameras to Carnaross Mart in January 2018 and completed testing of them the day before marts were shut in 2020, giving the Meath mart the advantage over others.

By the beginning of April, at least two dozen agricultural shows had been cancelled—among these were events scheduled for Athenry, Athlone, Ballinrobe, the Ballivor Horse Show, Ballyfoyle, Bandon, Bannow/Rathangan, Belgooly, Carnew, Charleville, Corrandulla, Dungarvan, Ennistymon, Gorey, Midleton, Newmarket-on-Fergus, Nobber, Oldcastle, Riverstown, Scarriff, Tydavnet, Tullamore and Westport. 8 May brought the cancellation of the 2020 National Ploughing Championships, due to have taken place in County Carlow in mid-September.

On 12 June, the Government of Ireland approved a €50m support package for beef farmers who experienced significant difficulty arising from the economic impact of COVID-19.

On 14 May 2021, the 2021 National Ploughing Championships, due to have taken place in County Laois in September, was cancelled for a second year due to uncertainty over COVID-19 restrictions. On 15 September, the National Ploughing Championships went ahead in Ratheniska, County Laois on a much scaled-back level, with the trade exhibition element and the world ploughing contest cancelled.

== Finance, businesses and the economy ==
On 16 March 2020, Minister for Employment Affairs and Social Protection Regina Doherty announced the COVID-19 Pandemic Unemployment Payment, which would be available for six weeks.

On 18 March, banks—together with Minister for Finance Paschal Donohoe—announced a range of measures, including providing working capital, payment breaks and deferred court proceedings.

On 19 March, Regina Doherty announced that all welfare would be distributed each fortnight instead of the traditional weekly, so as to limit the number of people gathering in post offices.

On 24 March, the Temporary COVID-19 Wage Subsidy Scheme was announced for a twelve-week run beginning on 26 March. This allowed employers maintain responsibility for paying employees during the pandemic with the intention of maintaining the employer-employee relationship and ensure that employees continued to be registered with their employers, so that they will be able to get back to work quickly after the pandemic. The Temporary COVID-19 Wage Subsidy Scheme replaced an earlier COVID-19 Employer Refund Scheme. By early April, the Central Statistics Office (CSO) announced that a figure equivalent to more than one tenth of the country's population were unemployed. A spokesman for Goodbody Stockbrokers described it as "unprecedented". By the following week, the numbers receiving income supports had increased by 40% from the previous week's total.

The Revenue Commissioners announced that tax exiles, normally permitted to spend 183 days of each year within Ireland, could stay for longer in 2020—without affecting taxation—if they could provide evidence that the virus prevented them from leaving.

On 15 April, the Central Bank of Ireland published two reports highlighting a significant reduction in cash and ATM usage in the country.

On 8 May, Central Statistics Office (CSO) figures showed an unemployment rate surpassing 28%, the largest in two decades.

On 9 May, Minister for Business, Enterprise and Innovation Heather Humphreys announced a "Return to Work Safely Protocol" which was published online to support employers and workers to put measures in place that would prevent the spread of COVID-19 in the workplace, when the economy begins to slowly open up.

On 15 May, Minister Humphreys announced details of a new €250m "Restart Grant" which would give direct grant aid of between €2,000 and €10,000 to small businesses to help them with the costs associated with reopening and re-employing workers following the COVID-19 closures. The scheme would open for applications on 22 May.

On 22 May, the Government had signed off on €6.8 billion in extra funding for the Department of Employment Affairs and Social Protection, as it was due to reach this year's spending limit early the following month.

On 28 August, Minister for Finance Paschal Donohoe encouraged employers to register for the Employment Wage Subsidy Scheme which replaces the Temporary COVID-19 Wage Subsidy Scheme from 1 September 2020. The scheme provides a flat-rate subsidy to qualifying employers whose turnover has fallen 30% based on the numbers of eligible employees on the employer's payroll, including seasonal staff and new employees. On 1 September, over 22,100 employers registered for the new Employment Wage Subsidy Scheme which replaced the Temporary COVID-19 Wage Subsidy Scheme.

On 7 September, it was announced that Ireland was now officially in recession after the economy shrank by 6.1% between April and June as the impact of COVID-19 brought the largest quarterly drop on record, following new figures published by the Central Statistics Office.

On 19 October, the Government confirmed that the COVID-19 Pandemic Unemployment Payment would be restored to €350 for anyone who was earning more than €400 before they lost their job due to COVID-19 restrictions.

On 9 February 2021, the Government announced funding of €160 million in additional supports for businesses affected by COVID-19.

The COVID-19 Pandemic Unemployment Payment was repeatedly extended, until it closed to new applicants on 22 January 2022, and officially ended on 25 March 2022.

== Hospitality ==
By mid-March 2020, nearly 3% of the population—140,000 people (including 70,000 restaurant staff and 50,000 pub and bar staff)—had lost their jobs due to restrictions brought in to delay the virus's spread. The numbers of people in normally busy Dublin areas such as Grafton Street dropped by percentages in the sixties, seventies and eighties.

=== Restaurants, cafés and pubs ===
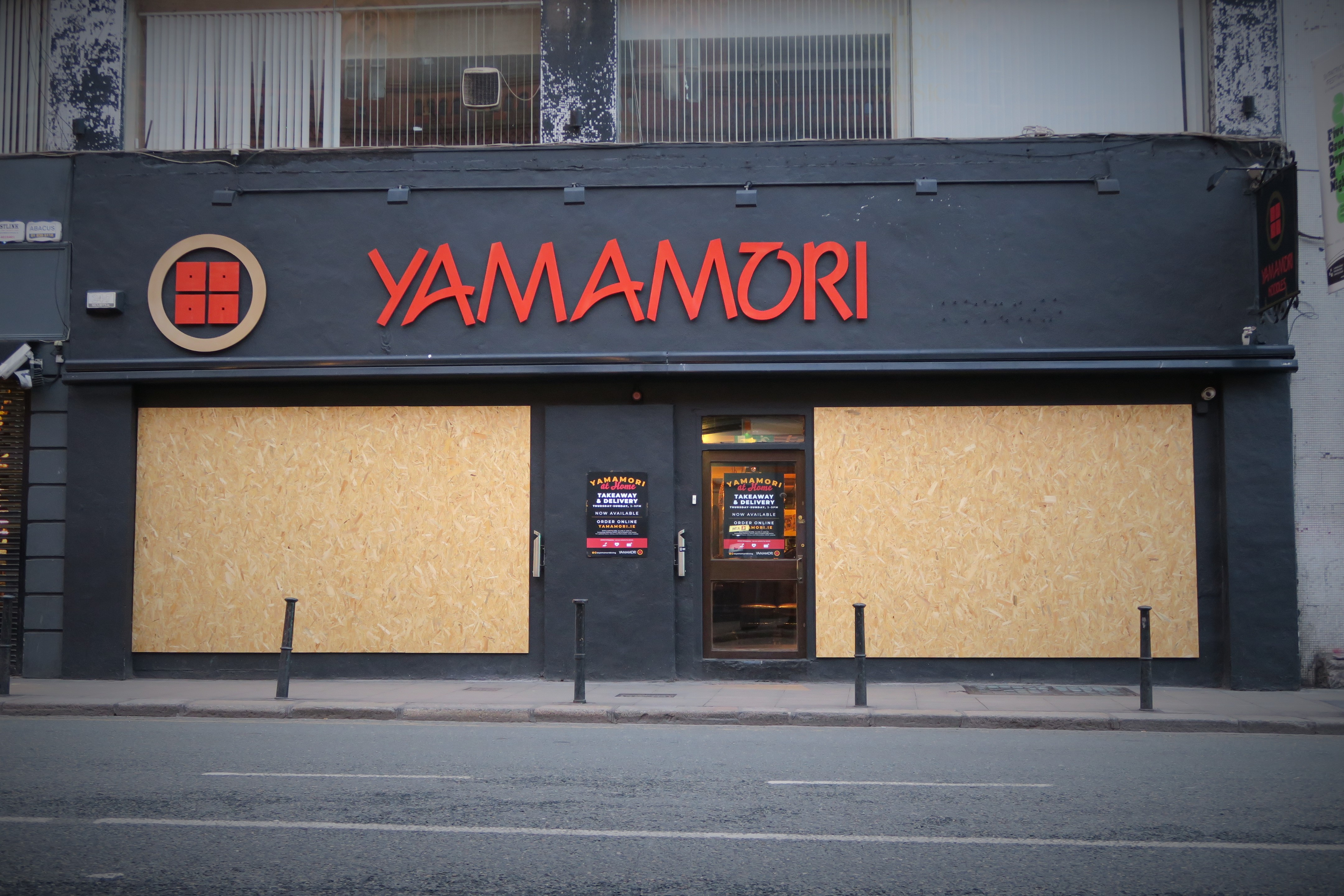
A boarded-up Japanese restaurant in Dublin

Restaurants decided to shut their doors on their own initiative. On 22 March, it was announced that all McDonald's outlets in Ireland and the United Kingdom would be closed from 7 pm on 23 March. The Irish Farmers' Association (IFA) outlined the impact this would have on Irish beef farmers, as McDonald's is their biggest customer, dealing with 18,000 Irish farms and using Irish beef in one fifth of its burgers across Europe. The day after the McDonald's announcement, coffeehouse chain Costa Coffee and restaurant franchise Subway both announced they would shut their Irish outlets, as did doughnut company Krispy Kreme do regarding its one Irish outlet in Dublin. The Irish fast food restaurant chain Supermac's announced the same day as the Costa and Subway closures that it would shut all its restaurants by the evening of 26 March; it intended the delay to allow emergency services using its facilities time to plan where they would eat, but did say it would shut its seating areas that night. By August 2020, McDonald's, Supermac's, Costa Coffee, Subway and Krispy Kreme reopened providing takeaway, delivery or drive thru services only.

As the third phase of the government's roadmap got underway on 29 June, all restaurants and cafés reopened serving on premises food and strict social distancing and cleaning measures in place. Pubs and bars reopened only if they served "substantial" meals of at least €9—according to the Government of Ireland and Fáilte Ireland.

On 4 August, Tánaiste Leo Varadkar announced that restaurants and pubs serving food would now have to close by 11 pm, but takeaways and deliveries could remain open after that time.

On 13 September, gardaí received legal powers to close restaurants and pubs which do not meet COVID-19 restrictions after President Michael D. Higgins signed into law the Criminal Justice Enforcement Powers COVID-19 Bill.

On 4 December, thousands of restaurants, cafés and gastropubs reopened after six weeks of closure.

On 12 December, a bakery in Drogheda, County Louth closed temporarily after around 15 employees tested positive for COVID-19.

On 24 December (Christmas Eve), all restaurants, cafés and gastropubs closed again at 3 pm following the reimposition of Level 5 lockdown restrictions (subject to a number of adjustments) until 12 January 2021 at the earliest, after a third wave of COVID-19 arrived in Ireland. Due to the repeated extension of Level 5 restrictions, all restaurants, cafés and gastropubs remained closed.

Under the Government's reopening plan throughout May and June 2021, outdoor services in restaurants and bars could recommence, with groups limited to a maximum of 6 people from 7 June 2021.

Under new COVID-19 safety guidelines issued by Fáilte Ireland on 26 May, a maximum of six people aged 13 years and over would be allowed per table when restaurants, pubs and cafés open in June, with up to 15 people allowed when accompanying children under the age of 12.

On 28 May, Taoiseach Micheál Martin confirmed that outdoor services in all restaurants and pubs could reopen from 7 June, while indoor services could reopen from 5 July.

On 7 June, all bars, restaurants and cafés reopened for outdoor service, as the gradual easing of COVID-19 restrictions continued.

On 21 June, Minister for Justice Heather Humphreys spoke to Garda Commissioner Drew Harris about the legal issues around outdoor drinking and pledged to take legislative action to facilitate outdoor hospitality if it was required, after Gardaí warned that alcohol licences were not valid for areas outside pubs and restaurants.

On 29 June, due to the rapidly increasing incidence of the Delta variant, the Government announced that the planned reopening of indoor dining and drinking in restaurants and pubs on 5 July would be delayed until at least 19 July when a system to verify vaccination or immunity would be implemented, while 50 guests would be permitted to attend wedding celebrations as an exception from July. On 5 July, a meeting between the hospitality sector and senior government officials took place to discuss the reopening of indoor dining and drinking with representatives told that indoor dining could reopen for 1.8 million fully vaccinated people with a self-regulated vaccine pass system. On 12 July, the Government approved legislation for the resumption of indoor hospitality, with proofs of vaccination needed for those who were vaccinated or recovered from COVID-19, while those under 18 would be required to be accompanied by a fully vaccinated person. On the night of 14 July, hundreds of people gathered outside the Convention Centre in Dublin to protest against the Government's response to the COVID-19 pandemic after the Dáil passed legislation to allow for the reopening of indoor dining. On 21 July, the Government agreed that indoor dining in pubs and restaurants could resume on Monday 26 July for fully vaccinated and COVID-19 recovered people, after President Michael D. Higgins signed the legislation underpinning new guidelines into law. Under the new guidelines, there would be no time limits for customers, closing time would be set at 11:30pm and up to six people would be allowed sit at tables that must be kept one metre apart. On 23 July, following lengthy discussions, draft guidelines for the reopening of bars and restaurants indoors on Monday 26 July were published. Under the guidelines, the EU Digital COVID Certificate (DCC) would be the primary evidence for proof of immunity, all customers would have to show photo ID and contact tracing details for all customers would have to be taken, with an online QR code scanner developed to verify people's DCCs.

On 6 August, in the wake of the Merrion Hotel controversy, Fáilte Ireland updated its hospitality guidelines to allow customers book multiple tables and host outdoor gatherings with live music for up to 200 people.

On 19 October, the Government published a revised plan for the easing of restrictions on 22 October, with normal operating hours for pubs and restaurants beyond 11:30pm to resume. On 21 October, updated guidelines for hospitality and for the reopening of nightclubs on 22 October were published, with nightclubs allowed to operate at 100% capacity, a maximum of 1,500 people permitted to dance or stand at live music venues and multiple table bookings allowed in pubs and restaurants.

On 3 December, as part of the Government's reintroduction of measures, all restaurants and bars were to revert to six adults per table and no multiple table bookings allowed from 7 December amid concerns of the Omicron variant.

On 17 December, to curb the spread of COVID-19 over the Christmas period, the Government announced an 8pm closing time for bars and restaurants that would commence from 20 December to 30 January.

On 21 January 2022, Taoiseach Micheál Martin announced the easing of almost all COVID-19 restrictions, with pubs and restaurants to resume normal trading times with no social distancing or vaccine certificates requirements, while rules on the wearing of masks would remain.

=== Pubs ===
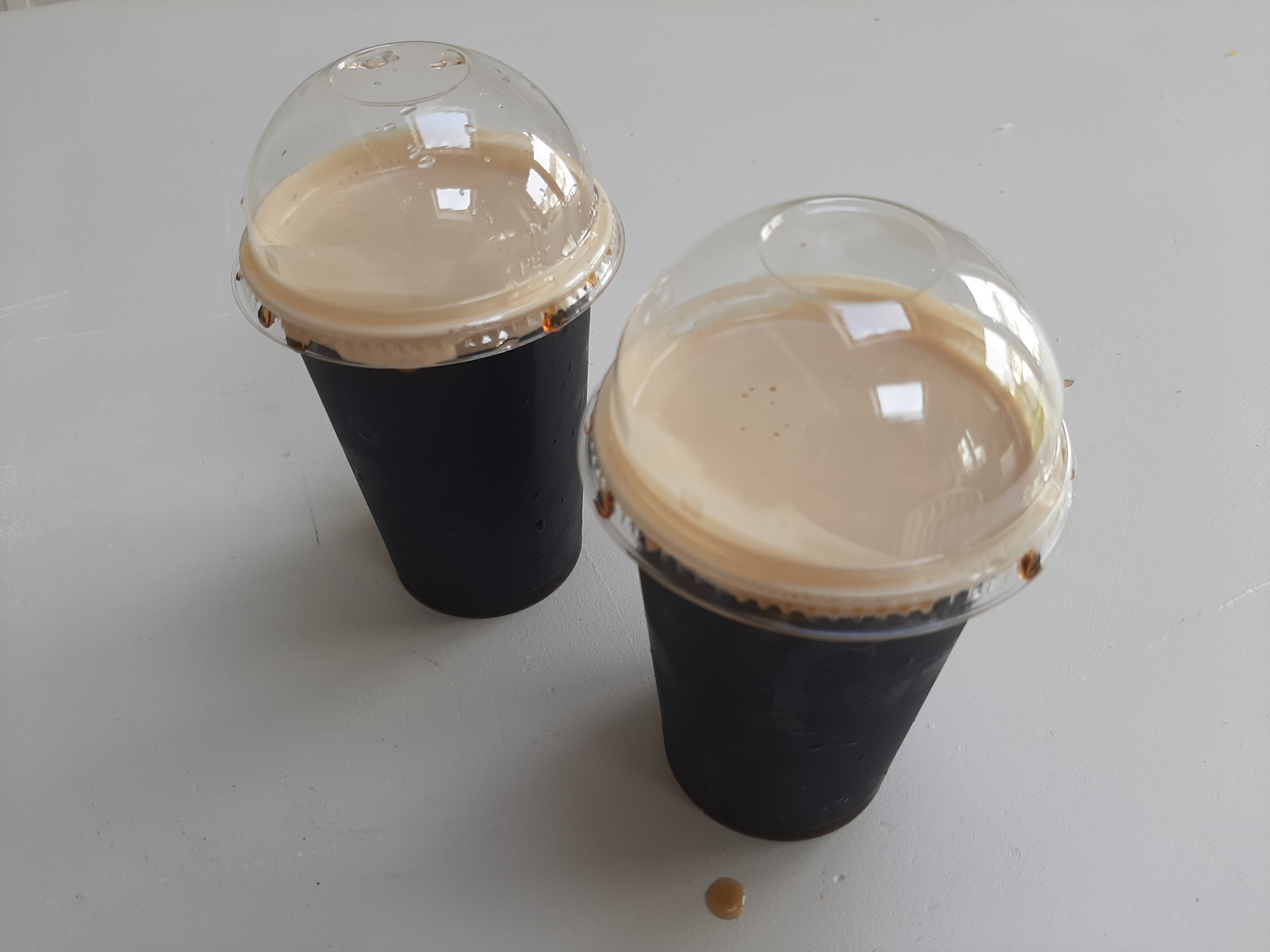
Two pints of the famed Irish stout Guinness delivered fresh from a pub. The delivery service of pints was a novel innovation of the pandemic in Ireland. An Garda Síochána—upon taking legal advice—confirmed that there was no law against the service.

Initially, pubs and bars were permitted to remain open if they respected the social distancing measures introduced on 12 March. However, difficulties in maintaining this became clear over the weekend before Saint Patrick's Day. On 14 March, Minister for Health Simon Harris slammed "insulting" videos on social media showing packed pubs and stag and hen parties at Temple Bar, Dublin. Harris acted swiftly, and—by the following morning—the Vintners' Federation of Ireland, the Licensed Vintners Association and the Irish government issued a joint call for all bars and pubs to close from midnight until 29 March at the earliest. Taoiseach Leo Varadkar announced that his intention is to seek enforcement powers from the Dáil or Seanad if necessary. Pubs continued to open though. Limerick County TD Niall Collins stated that pubs in Limerick were opening after the official shutdown had come into effect. Rogue pubs continued to operate into April in places such as Dublin (7 and 11) and Cork (including for a 40th birthday party).

In July 2020, pubs and bars reopened only if they served "substantial" meals of at least €9—according to the Government of Ireland and Fáilte Ireland. On 15 July, the Government of Ireland postponed the reopening of pubs, bars and hotel bars that don't serve food, due to reopen on 20 July, to 10 August. On 4 August, Taoiseach Micheál Martin announced that pubs, bars and hotel bars not serving food will remain closed.

On 8 September, the Government announced that pubs not serving food in Ireland could reopen on 21 September with strict regulations in place.

=== Hotels ===
On 29 March, the Health Service Executive (HSE) unveiled new facilities at Dublin's Citywest hotel; this had a dual purpose, for self-isolation of individuals where needed and as an overflow stepdown facility for patients from hospitals not yet able to go back home. The first patients began to arrive on 1 April.

On 29 April, the facility's manager reported an increase in referrals during the previous ten days and that 114 people were in their care on that date, out of an admissions and discharges total of more than 200 people as of that time.

On 19 June, the Health Service Executive announced that the cost of renting the hotel for COVID-19 use was likely to reach €21 million. The HSE was considering whether to end the lease.

On 9 October, following a survey published by the Irish Hotels Federation (IHF), more than 3.3 million bednight bookings have been lost following the Government's escalation to Level 3 COVID-19 restrictions.

Following the reimposition of Level 5 lockdown restrictions from 24 December (Christmas Eve) until 12 January 2021 at the earliest, hotels could remain open for food and bar services to guests only after 3 pm on Christmas Eve, and may only open to guests for essential purposes after 26 December (Saint Stephen's Day).

On 28 May, Taoiseach Micheál Martin confirmed that accommodation services including all hotels, B&Bs, self-catering and hostels could reopen from 2 June, with services including leisure facilities, indoor restaurant and bar services restricted to overnight guests/residents only.

== Stimulus packages ==
=== July Jobs Stimulus ===
On 23 July, the Government of Ireland launched a €7.4 billion July Jobs Stimulus package of 50 measures to boost economic recovery and get people back to work. The measures include the extension of the COVID-19 Pandemic Unemployment Payment to April 2021, and the replacement of the Temporary COVID-19 Wage Subsidy Scheme to the Employment Wage Subsidy Scheme from September 2020 and will run until April 2021. The spending primarily includes €115 million for active travel, public transport and renewal of transport infrastructure, €75 million for primary and secondary schools to carry out reconfiguration works necessary to support schools' reopening in late August and September 2020 and €112 million in employment services and supports to deliver 47,500 training and apprenticeship places and a €450 million package of business supports including a €250 million Restart Grant to provide direct grant aid to businesses with up to 250 employees to help them with the costs associated with reopening and reemploying workers.

On 3 September, as part of the July Jobs Stimulus, Taoiseach Micheál Martin, Minister for Finance Paschal Donohoe and Minister for Tourism, Culture, Arts, Gaeltacht, Sport and Media Catherine Martin launched the Stay and Spend Scheme to help drive sales in the hospitality sector during the off-season which has been negatively impacted as a result of COVID-19, which will run from 1 October 2020 to 30 April 2021.

On 7 September, as part of the July Jobs Stimulus, Tánaiste and Minister for Enterprise, Trade and Employment Leo Varadkar, Minister for Finance Paschal Donohoe, Minister for Public Expenditure and Reform Michael McGrath and Minister for Agriculture, Food and the Marine Charlie McConalogue opened the new €2 billion COVID-19 Credit Guarantee Scheme to provide Irish businesses, including those in the farming and fishing sectors, with access to low cost loans as they respond to the impacts of COVID-19.

=== Economic Recovery Plan 2021 ===
The Economic Recovery Plan 2021 is a €3.5 billion stimulus package announced by the Government of Ireland on 1 June 2021 to achieve rapid job creation and economic growth after the COVID-19 pandemic. The plan sets out a new phase of supports, investment and policies for a new stage of economic recovery and renewal, with new measures for businesses and affected sectors, and details for existing emergency pandemic financial supports including the COVID-19 Restrictions Support Scheme, Employment Wage Subsidy Scheme and Pandemic Unemployment Payment, giving certainty to businesses and employees and for those who need it most.

== Retail and services ==
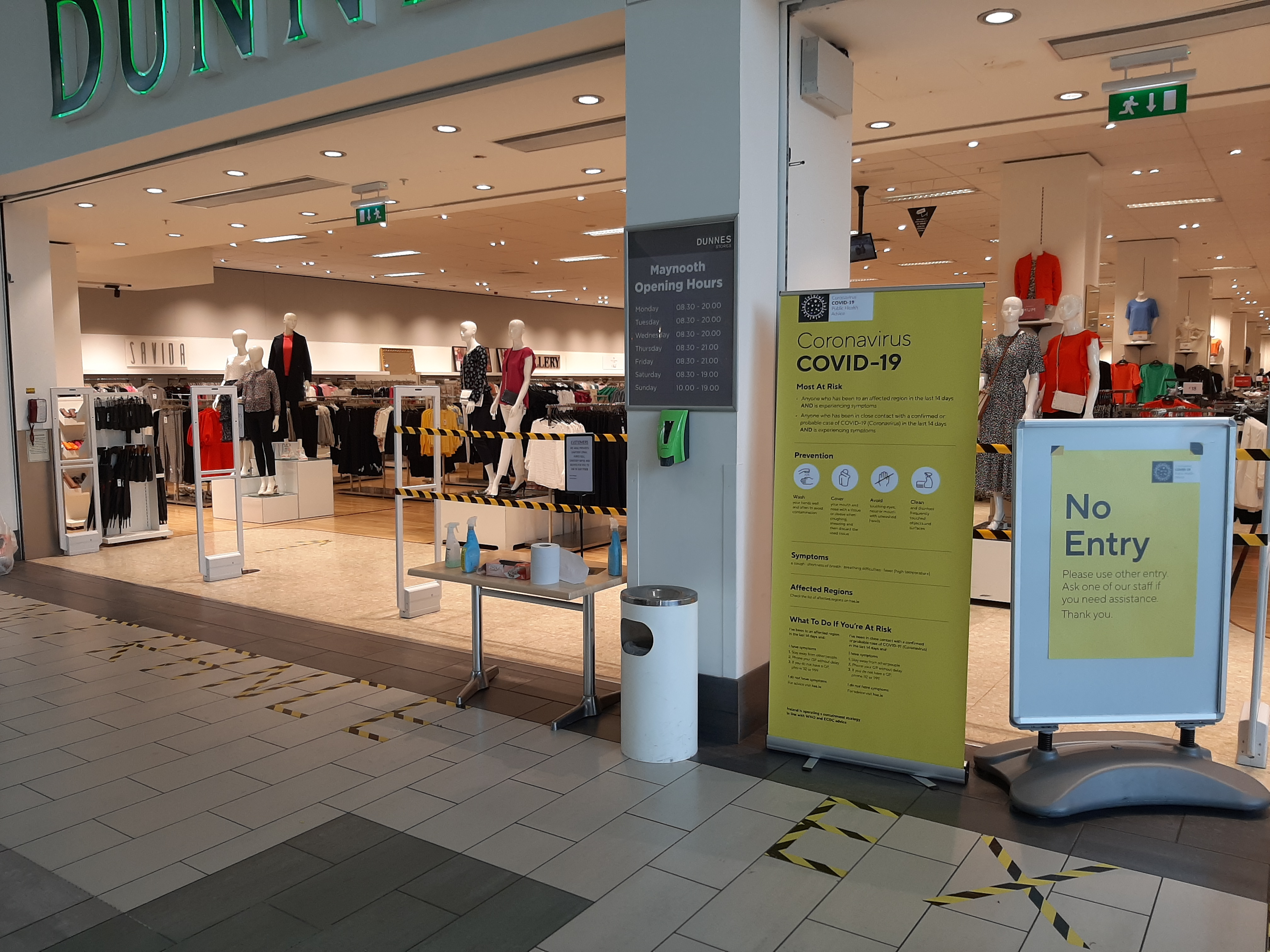
Supermarket: a one-way system, instructions on social distancing, disposable gloves, trolley cleaning supplies.

Panic buying of hand sanitisers and face masks ensued as fear of the pandemic spread. Supermarkets introduced social distancing measures and additional cleaning and disinfecting within stores. SuperValu announced Plexiglass would be distributed to its outlets nationwide; even small shops had Perspex protective screens placed in front of their cashier desks. Supermarkets had their busiest period in history, beating the previous Christmas record because of customers stockpiling food before the government stay-at-home order. Kantar reported sales of hand soap increased by 300% and facial tissues increased by 140% in the four weeks approaching 22 March. Kantar figures reported on 5 May stated that people were spending €118 more on average each month, with Super Valu outselling Dunnes Stores in April, and that the previous three months had a 17.2% increase in supermarket spending on the same period in 2019, with sales of ready meals declining and sales of flour and sugar up by 52% and 43% respectively.

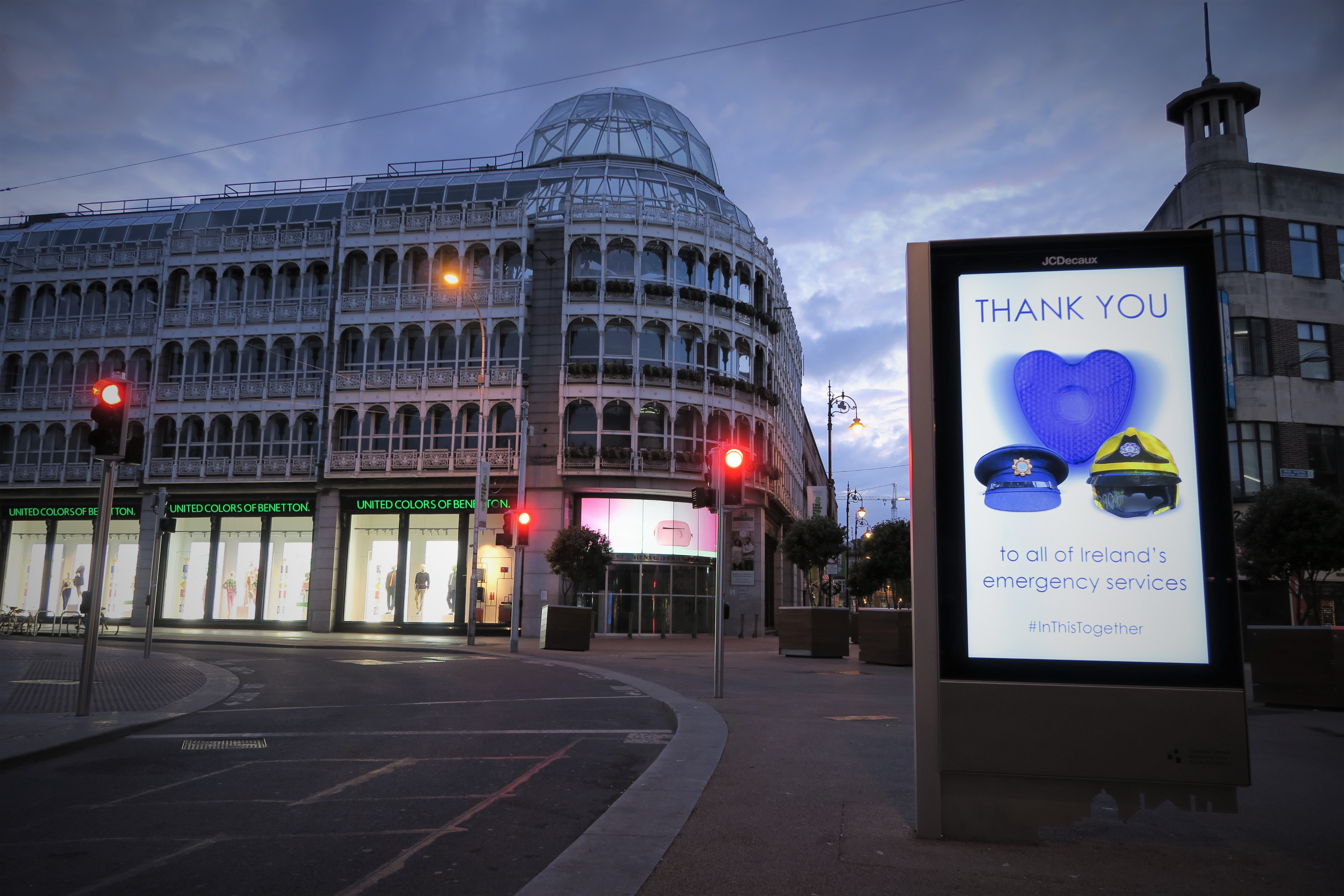
Red traffic lights with no traffic outside St Stephen's Green shopping centre in April 2020

Major departments stores shut, including McElhinney's on Sunday 13 March, while Brown Thomas and Arnotts closed on the evening of 18 March. The clothing retailer Penneys (which trades internationally as Primark) followed suit the same evening.

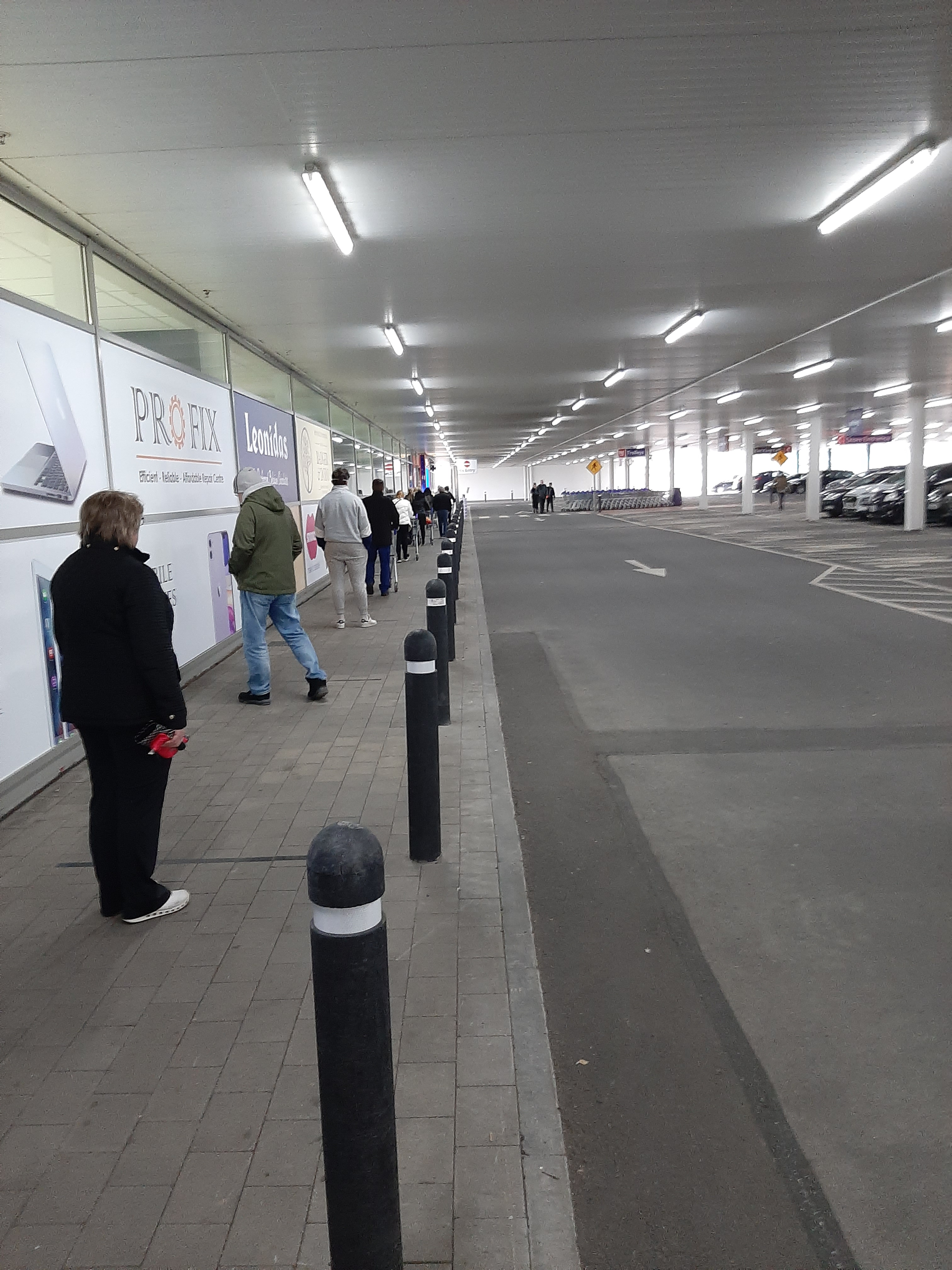
People queueing at an Irish supermarket; strips of black tape on the ground to demarcate 2-metre gaps.

Italian confectioner Ferrero SpA justified its decision to continue making Tic Tacs in the southern city of Cork during the nationwide shutdown by releasing a statement that said: "Food... as per the guidelines published by the Irish Government, falls under the critical sectors that should be maintained during the current crisis". Mick Barry, the local TD, disputed this, and described it as "a joke to say that they are involved in essential food production. No one is going to starve if there's a shortage of Tic Tacs for a couple of weeks".

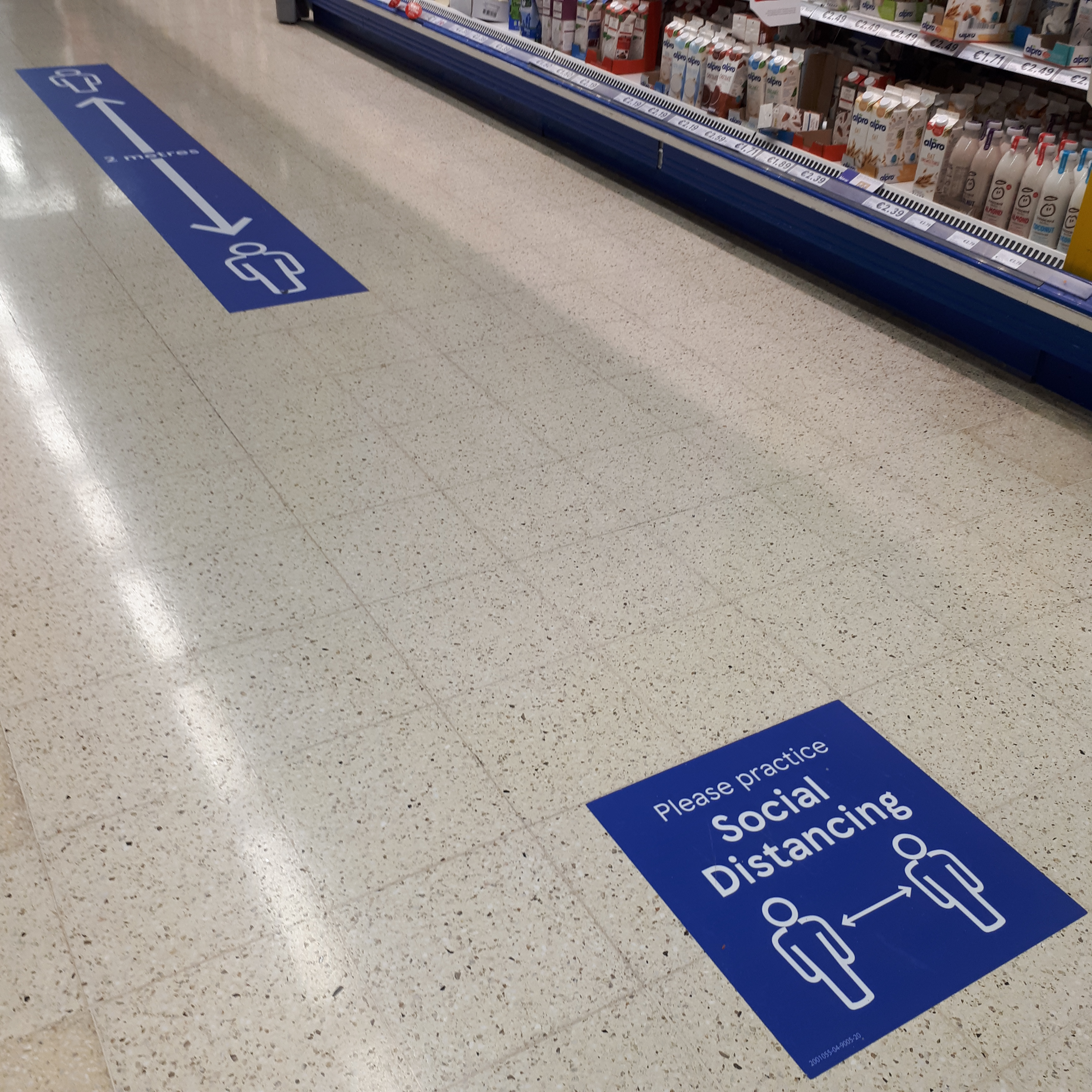
Social distancing floor signs in an Irish supermarket in August 2020.

On 7 April, figures from the IHS Markit Dublin Purchasing Managers index confirmed that business growth in Dublin stagnated in the first quarter of 2020, meaning that the continuous output growth that Dublin had experienced for seven consecutive years ended.

On 9 April, Debenhams announced it would place its Irish stores into liquidation. In mid-April, the High Court appointed provisional liquidators to the Irish branches of British retail chains Oasis and Warehouse. The High Court did likewise for Laura Ashley's five outlets. On 11 May, the High Court ordered that the Irish branches of Oasis and Warehouse were insolvent and could be wound up.

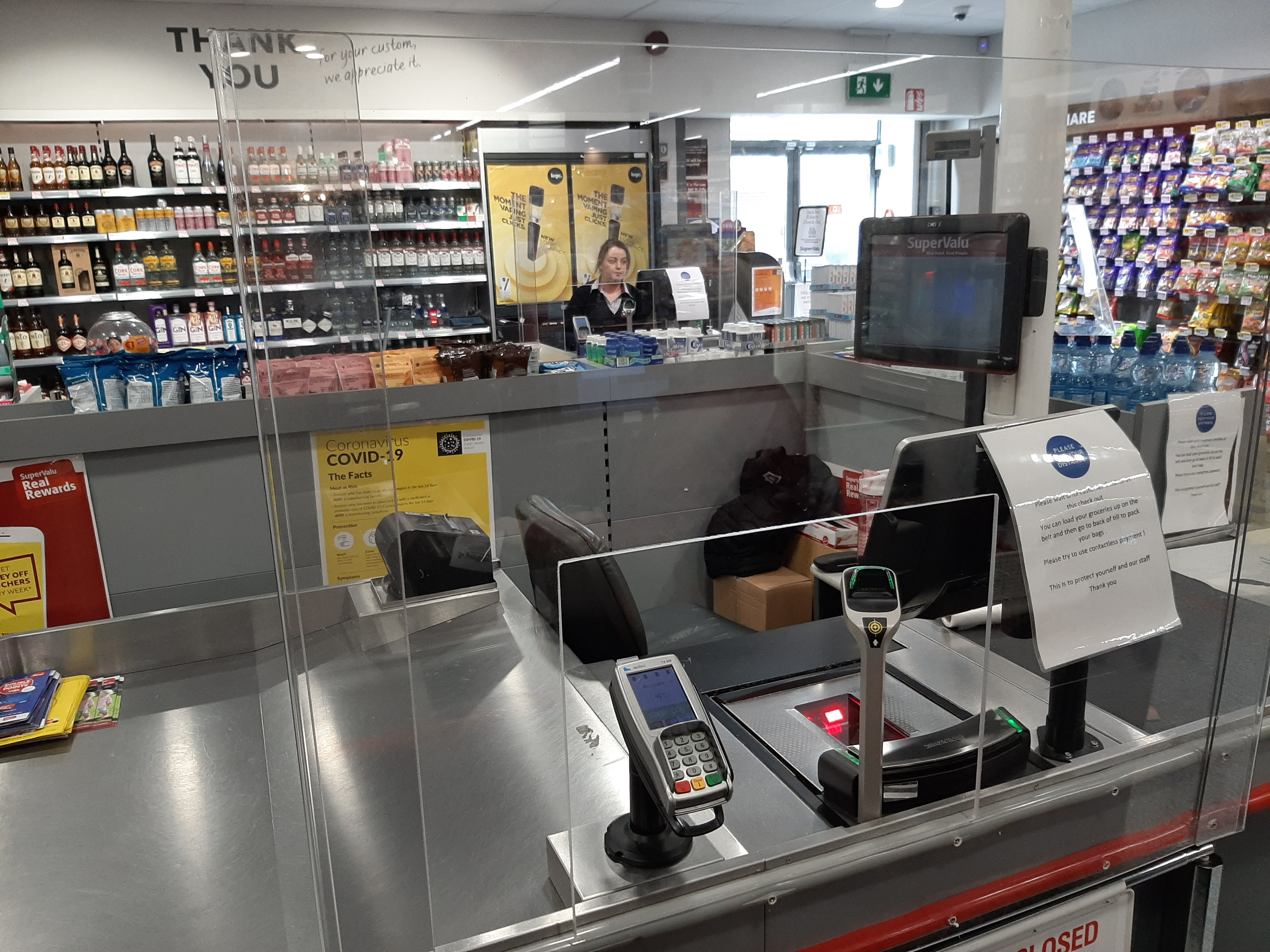
Ersatz protection for employees deployed in a grocery store during the pandemic.

The emergence of grass from between the cobbles of Grafton Street in Dublin was attributed to the absence of pedestrians. Film footage of a fox browsing the shop doorways of Brown Thomas before dashing across the street to peep into the (shut, yet advertised as "open") Foodhall of the British retailer Marks & Spencer circulated on social media. A zoologist from Trinity College reckoned the fox (named Sam, sex uncertain) to be about 11 months of age, whose parents had ejected it from a den in Merrion Square, while a University College Dublin (UCD) zoologist reckoned the fox was fully grown and healthy and that the presence of foxes in daylight could be attributed to the restrictions then in force; Sam, who had a mangy tail, was also seen roaming around others parts of Dublin city centre, including Temple Bar, as well as at Leinster House during government formation talks.

Major retail stores including department and clothing stores reopened from 8 June—following the government's roadmap of easing COVID-19 restrictions. By early-June, Penneys, McElhinney's, Brown Thomas and Arnotts reopened while retail outlets in shopping centres were not allowed to reopen and remained closed until 15 June.

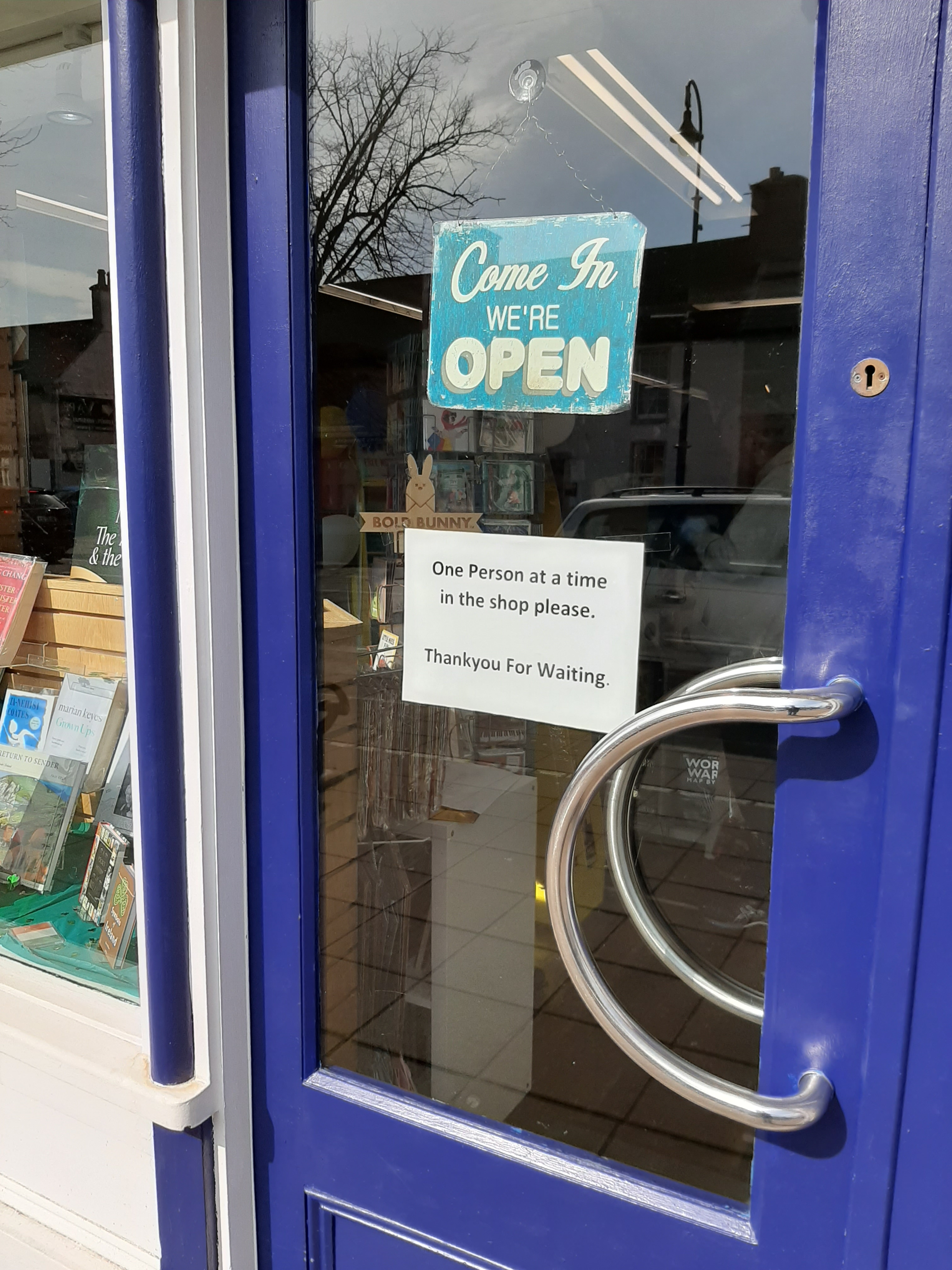
Shop door showing social distancing measures.

Bookshops also made alterations to how they did business, and often with contrasting approaches; Hodges Figgis in Dublin removed tables, while Charlie Byrne's Bookshop in Galway used its large tables as "natural separators".

On 15 July, Taoiseach Micheál Martin announced that face coverings must be worn in all shops and shopping centres from 20 July. On 10 August, Martin made the wearing of face coverings mandatory in all shops, shopping centres, libraries, cinemas, museums, nail salons, hairdressers, dry cleaners, betting stores, tattooists and travel agents, with fines of up to €2,500 or a prison sentence of six months to people who do not comply.

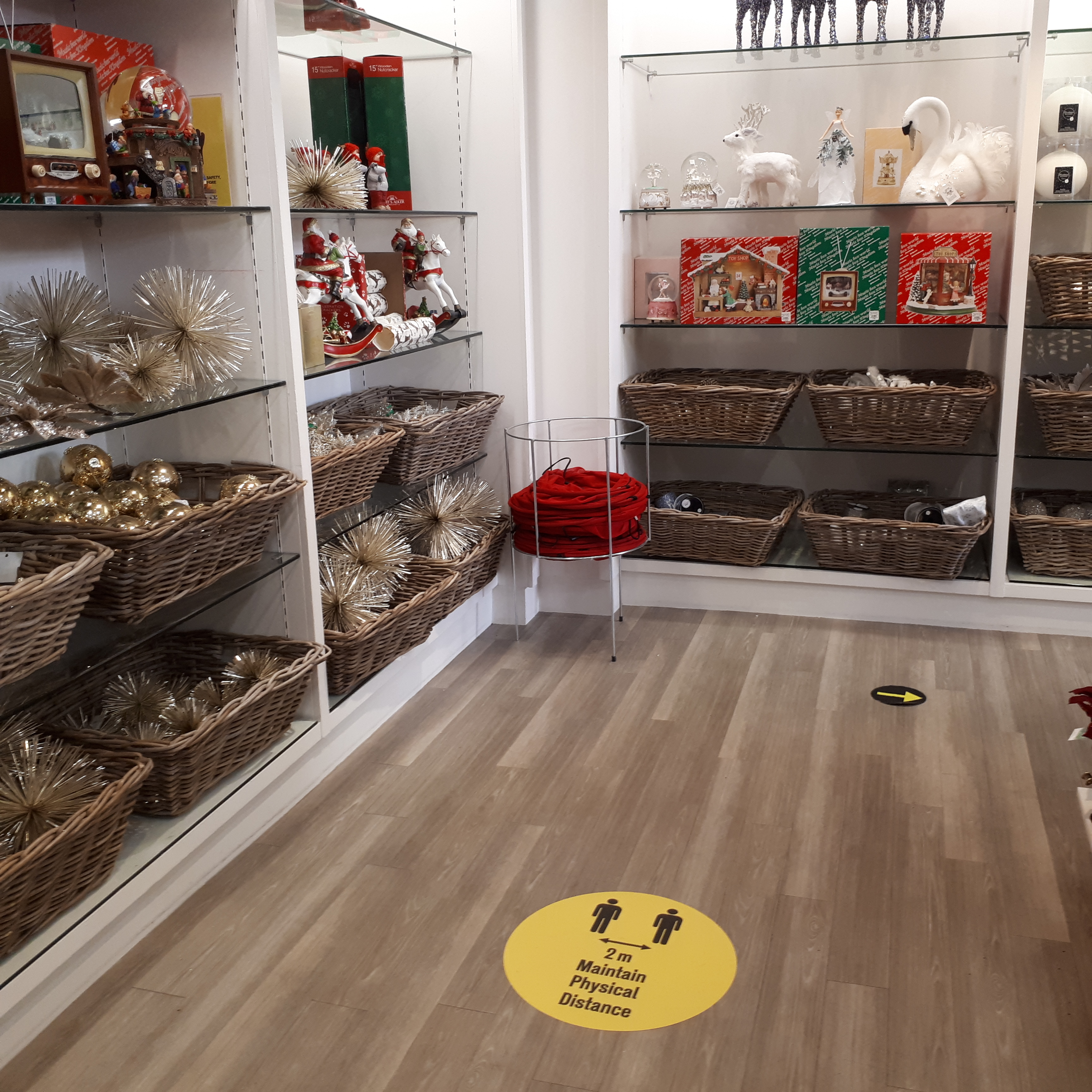
Floor physical distancing sign in an Irish store, amidst Christmas merchandise, in October 2020.

On 9 October, a business group of 2,500 businesses in Dublin city centre urged consumers to start their Christmas shopping early to prevent large queues in December.

All non-essential businesses and services closed and all public and private gatherings of any number of people was banned again on 21 October following the Government's announcement to move the entire country to Level 5 lockdown restrictions for six weeks until 1 December.

On 23 October, it was announced that a planned expansion of The Square (a shopping centre in Tallaght) had been postponed, with management Sigma Retail Partners blaming the pandemic.

On 27 November, the Government agreed the approach for easing restrictions, including a phased move to Level 3 restrictions nationally from midnight on Tuesday 1 December, with a number of exceptions in place for the Christmas period from 18 December.

On 1 December, all non-essential retail shops, hair and beauty providers, gyms and leisure centres, cinemas, museums and galleries reopened after six weeks of closure.

A third wave of COVID-19 arrived in Ireland after restrictions eased from 1 December. The Government delayed the introduction of restrictions and it was only after significant mixing had taken place in gastropubs and restaurants that on 24 December (Christmas Eve), Level 5 lockdown restrictions were reimposed nationwide with a number of adjustments, including keeping all non-essential retail shops open, but the postponement of all January sale events. However, all services—including hair and beauty providers—had to close again.

While all non-essential retail were forced to close once again on 31 December (New Year's Eve), following the government's decision to reimpose full Level 5 lockdown restrictions nationwide in a bid to decelerate the rapid increase in COVID-19 infections, all click-and-collect services for non-essential retail were no longer allowed to be used from 6 January 2021.

On 26 January, the Government made the wearing of face coverings in all banks, credit unions and post offices mandatory.

On 28 January, former employees of Arcadia Group's Irish outlets such as Topshop and Wallis were told they would be made permanently redundant.

On 17 May, all non-essential retail reopened for the first time in over four months after the Level 5 lockdown.

== Transport and travel ==
=== Aviation ===
On 14 March—following the Irish government's decision to lockdown the country in a bid to decelerate the rapid spread of the virus after its arrival on the island—Aer Lingus waived change fees on flights booked for March, April and May, while Ryanair waived change fees on flights booked until the end of March. By April, Dublin Airport was only running repatriation flights, or those with vital supplies (a reduction of more than 95% from the same week in 2019); Cork Airport was reduced to three return flights each day, all of which went to and from London, the first of which left at 4 pm and the last returning at 7:30 pm; Ireland West Airport had no commercial flights and both daily flights to and from Kerry Airport went to Dublin.

The High Court appointed an interim examiner to CityJet in mid-April.

As of early April—and unlike airports in east Asia—passengers on the few flights still arriving in Ireland were not having their temperatures checked for symptoms of the virus.

Minister for Health Simon Harris told the Dáil on 23 April that arrivals at an airport would be obliged to fill out a form stating their place of residence for the course of their stay in the country.

On 12 May, it was revealed that Gardaí would be given the power to check passengers arriving in Ireland from overseas under new COVID-19 restrictions being considered by the Government. Gardaí would be permitted to call to the addresses of passengers to ensure their adherence to self-isolation for two weeks upon arrival in Ireland.

On 20 December, the Government agreed to impose a 48-hour suspension on flights from the United Kingdom from midnight following fears over the spread of a new strain of COVID-19, while ferries will be limited to freight travel.

On 22 December, the Department of Foreign Affairs, in conjunction with the Department of Transport, announced that travel restrictions from the United Kingdom would remain in place until 31 December, following fears over the spread of a new strain of COVID-19.

On 6 January 2021, the Government announced that travel restrictions from the United Kingdom would remain in place until 9 January when the requirement for all passengers from the UK and South Africa to have a negative PCR test that they acquired within 72 hours of travelling to be in place.

On 12 January, the Government agreed that all passengers arriving into Ireland would need a negative PCR COVID-19 test taken 72 hours before departure from Saturday 16 January.

On 1 February, Europol warned travellers to watch for organised crime gangs selling fake negative COVID-19 certificates at airports. On the same day, latest figures showed that in the last 4 days of January, Gardaí fined 280 people at Dublin Airport for leaving the country for non-essential travel.

On 10 February, Taoiseach Micheál Martin announced that fines for non-essential travel abroad would be increased from €500 to €2,000, after a request was made to Minister for Health Stephen Donnelly to sign off on the increase.

On 15 June, the Government agreed to increase the self-isolation period for travellers arriving in Ireland from Britain from 5 to 10 days for those who are not fully vaccinated amid Delta variant concerns.

On 19 July, Ireland joined the rest of the EU in implementing the Digital COVID-19 Certificate as travel restrictions into and out of the country eased.

On 5 January 2022, the Government agreed to remove the requirement for air passengers entering the country to have a negative COVID-19 test. On 6 January, people who received a third or booster vaccine dose began receiving an updated Digital COVID Certificate.

==== Repatriation efforts ====
The virus prompted the "biggest repatriation ever in the history of the State", according to Tánaiste and Minister for Foreign Affairs Simon Coveney, involving the rescue of citizens stranded in such foreign lands as Australia, New Zealand, India, South Africa and Vietnam.

On 22 March, Coveney announced the planned repatriation, by charter flight, of Irish citizens from Peru. On 30 March, the repatriation flight touched down at Dublin Airport.

One man repatriated from Canada through London on 23 March travelled from Dublin Airport to his home in County Leitrim in his father's cattle trailer as a precaution; word of the trip spread internationally to both hemispheres.

On 15 May, it was reported that the Ireland's Call initiative, which had been established to repatriate Irish healthcare workers stranded in foreign lands, would cease after 21 nurses were repatriated from the Philippines the following Wednesday. In addition to delivering PPE and housing 43 frontline workers, the volunteer initiative raised over €90,000 and repatriated 67 healthcare workers from 19 countries, funding 154 flights.

==== Passenger locator form ====
On 22 May, Minister for Health Simon Harris announced that from 28 May, all passengers arriving into the country would be legally required to complete a passenger locator form. He also announced that it would be an offence not to fill in a passenger location form, with fines of up to €2,500 or a potential prison sentence.

On 22 August, Minister for Health Stephen Donnelly confirmed that the passenger locator form would move to an online process on Wednesday 26 August.

==== Green list ====
A green list for safe travel was due to be published by the Government of Ireland on 20 July, but was postponed due to ongoing negotiations in Brussels, where Taoiseach Micheál Martin was attending an EU summit.

On 21 July, following a Cabinet meeting at Dublin Castle, the Government of Ireland agreed to add 15 countries to the green list from which people could travel to without having to restrict their movements for 14 days upon arriving in Ireland, to be reviewed on a fortnightly basis. The countries were: Malta, Finland, Norway, Italy, Hungary, Estonia, Latvia, Lithuania, Cyprus, Slovakia, Greece, Greenland, Gibraltar, Monaco and San Marino.

On 4 August, following the postponement of phase four of easing COVID-19 restrictions—due to have taken place on 10 August—Taoiseach Micheál Martin announced the removal of five countries on the green list. The countries removed were: Cyprus, Malta, Gibraltar, Monaco and San Marino.

On 17 September, the Department of Foreign Affairs added Germany and Poland to the government's travel green list, while seven countries were removed. The countries removed were: Italy, Greece, Hungary, Norway, Slovakia, Greenland and Estonia.

On 24 September, the Department of Foreign Affairs updated the government's travel green list which will come into effect from 28 September, adding Liechtenstein and removing four countries from the list. The countries removed were: Germany, Poland, Iceland and Lithuania.

On 8 October, after a review on the basis of data from the European Centre for Disease Prevention and Control (ECDC), the Department of Foreign Affairs confirmed that from 12 October, there will be no countries on the Government's travel green list.

The government's green list for safe travel was abolished on 8 November after being replaced by the EU's traffic light system for air travel that came into operation in Ireland from midnight.

==== EU traffic light system for international travel ====
On 22 October, the Government agreed to align Ireland with the new European 'traffic light' system to coordinate international COVID-19 travel restrictions coming into force on Sunday 8 November.

On 8 November, the EU's traffic light system for air travel came into operation in Ireland from midnight, with the European Centre for Disease Prevention and Control (ECDC) publishing a three-stage colour system map every week to indicate the level of risk in each area of the EU.

On 19 November, the ECDC moved Ireland from 'red' to 'orange' on the EU traffic light map for international travel after COVID-19 figures improved. However, after a third wave of COVID-19 arrived in the country in late December 2020, on 29 January 2021, the ECDC moved Ireland from 'orange' to 'dark red' on the EU traffic light map for international travel.

==== List of "high-risk" countries for international travel ====
A list of "high risk" countries for international travel was published by the Government on 26 January 2021, which included Brazil and South Africa. All people travelling into Ireland from the countries on the list would be required to quarantine at a hotel for a period of 14 days.

The list was abolished on 25 September following the end of Ireland's mandatory hotel quarantine system, with the remaining six countries—Argentina, Bolivia, Brazil, Chile, Colombia and Peru—removed.

==== Mandatory hotel quarantine ====
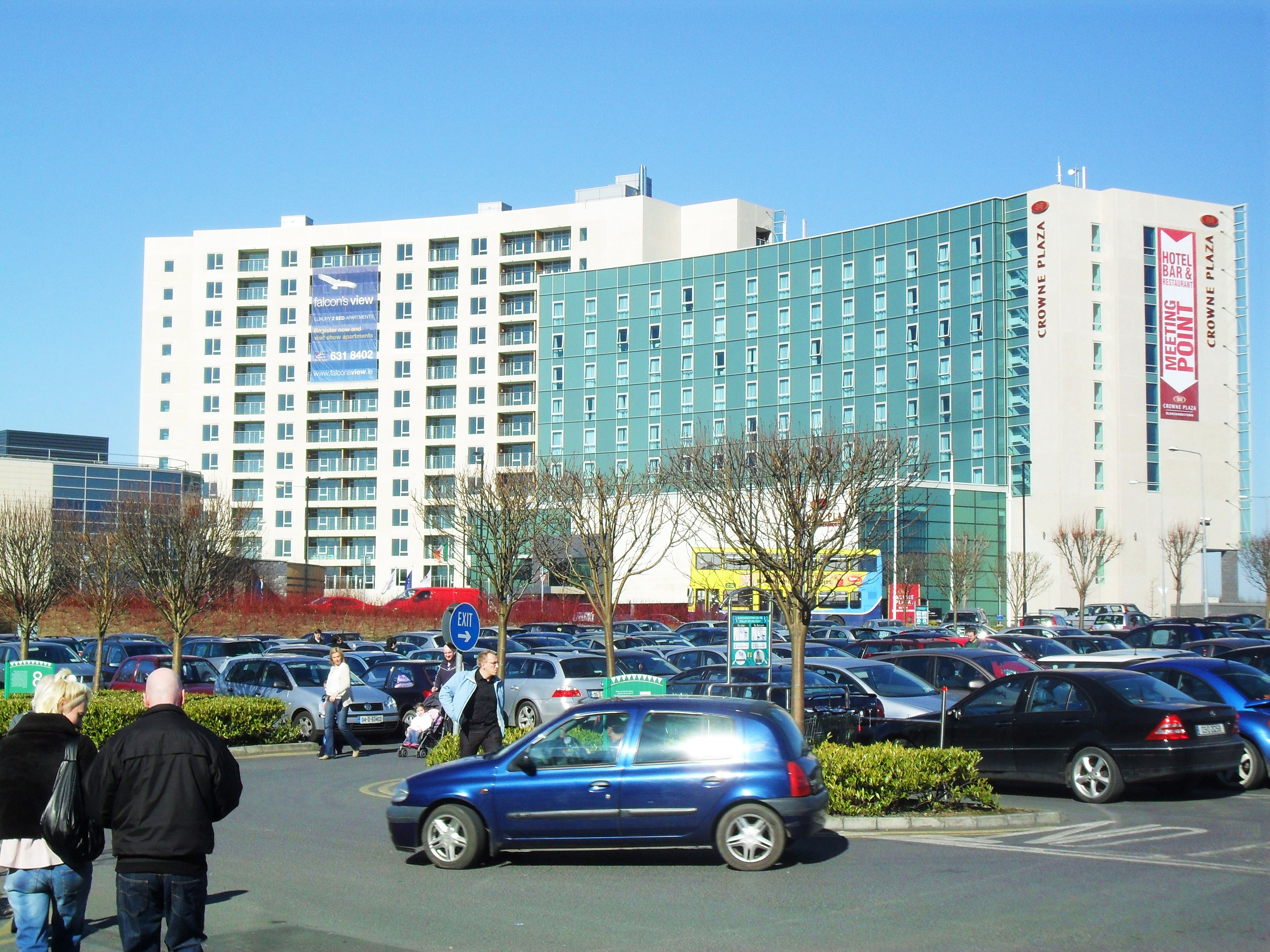
Crowne Plaza Hotel, Blanchardstown, one of the hotels providing mandatory hotel quarantine.

On 7 March, President Michael D. Higgins signed into law the legislation to bring in mandatory hotel quarantine for certain passengers entering the country from high-risk countries.

On 23 March, the booking portal for mandatory hotel quarantine in Ireland opened for those arriving into the country from Friday 26 March, with a 12-night stay for passengers arriving from high risk countries costing €1,875 each. On 26 March at 4 am, Ireland's mandatory hotel quarantine system for all passengers arriving into the country from high-risk countries came into force.

On 27 March, one day after mandatory hotel quarantine began in Ireland, Gardaí began an investigation after three people absconded from a mandatory hotel quarantine facility near Dublin Airport while on a smoking break outside under supervision, with one person located. One day after the incident on 28 March, a second person was located, while a search for the third male continued.

On 30 March, the Health Service Executive (HSE) confirmed that three passengers staying in mandatory hotel quarantine tested positive for COVID-19.

On 2 April, two women in their 30s were arrested and charged after refusing to enter mandatory hotel quarantine upon arrival in Dublin Airport from Dubai. On 4 April, the High Court made orders allowing two women who refused to enter mandatory hotel quarantine after arriving into Dublin Airport following their return from a trip to Dubai for cosmetic procedures to leave Mountjoy Women's Prison and continue to quarantine at a designated hotel.

On 6 April, three women who absconded from a mandatory hotel quarantine facility in Dublin were found by Gardaí almost 200 km away near Loughrea, County Galway.

On 8 April, latest figures from the HSE showed that 10 confirmed cases of COVID-19 had been detected among arrivals into Ireland who were in mandatory hotel quarantine.

On 11 April, an Irish man and an Israeli woman who challenged their detention in mandatory hotel quarantine and claimed they had been fully vaccinated against COVID-19 were released pending court hearings.

On 16 April, the European Commission urged the Government to amend or possibly scrap mandatory hotel quarantine for EU citizens and sought clarifications as to why a number of EU member states were subject to the rules.

On 27 July, Gardaí began a major investigation after a female member of the Defence Forces was allegedly raped by a male colleague in a mandatory quarantine hotel facility in Dublin.

On 25 September, the mandatory hotel quarantine system ended immediately following an announcement by Minister for Health Stephen Donnelly, with all countries removed from the list of "high-risk" countries for international travel.

On 30 November, the Government announced that legislation allowing for the re-establishment of mandatory hotel quarantine would be introduced, under additional measures in a bid to curb the spread of COVID-19.

=== Public transport ===
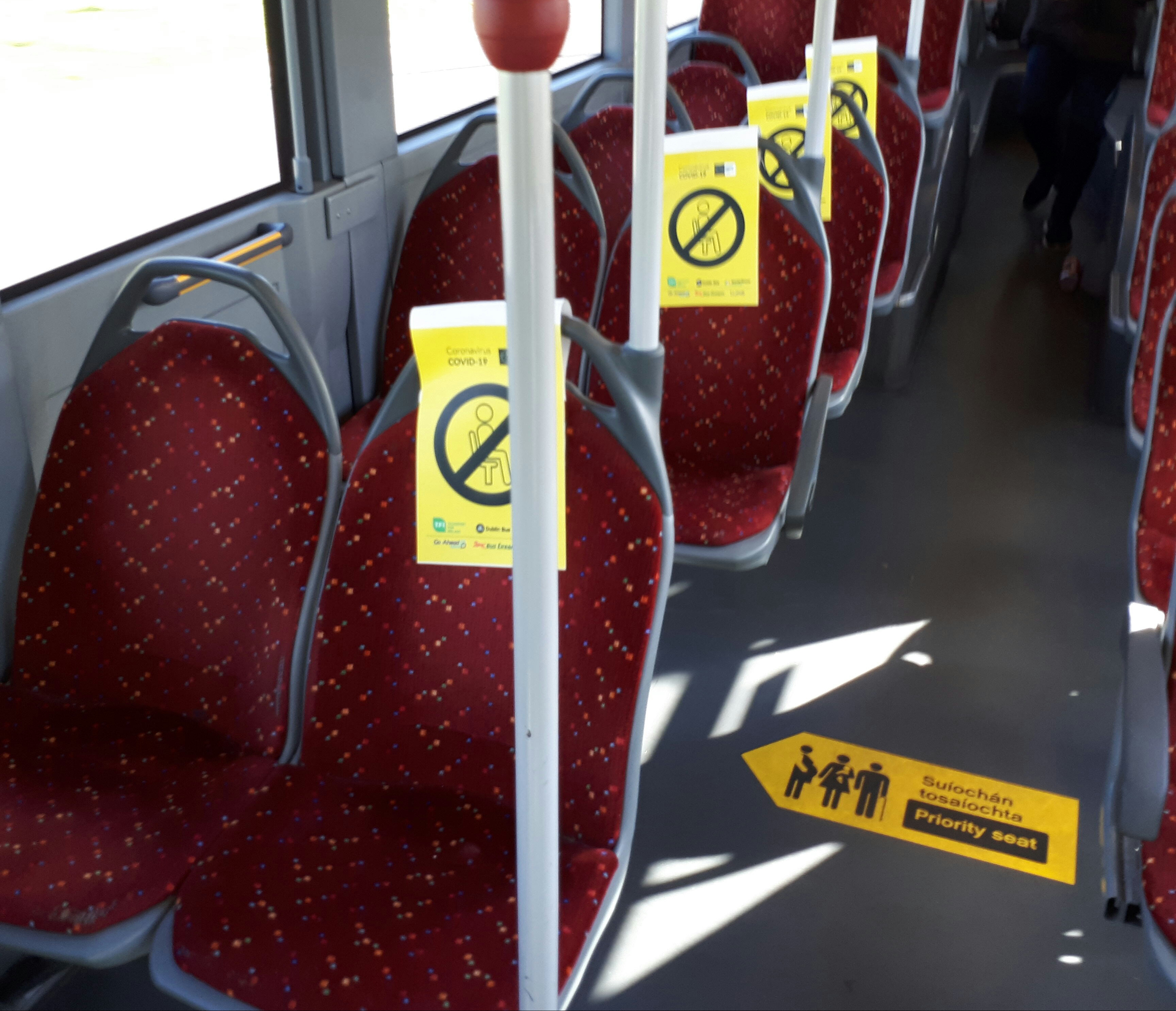
Bus Éireann social distancing signs on a bus in October 2020

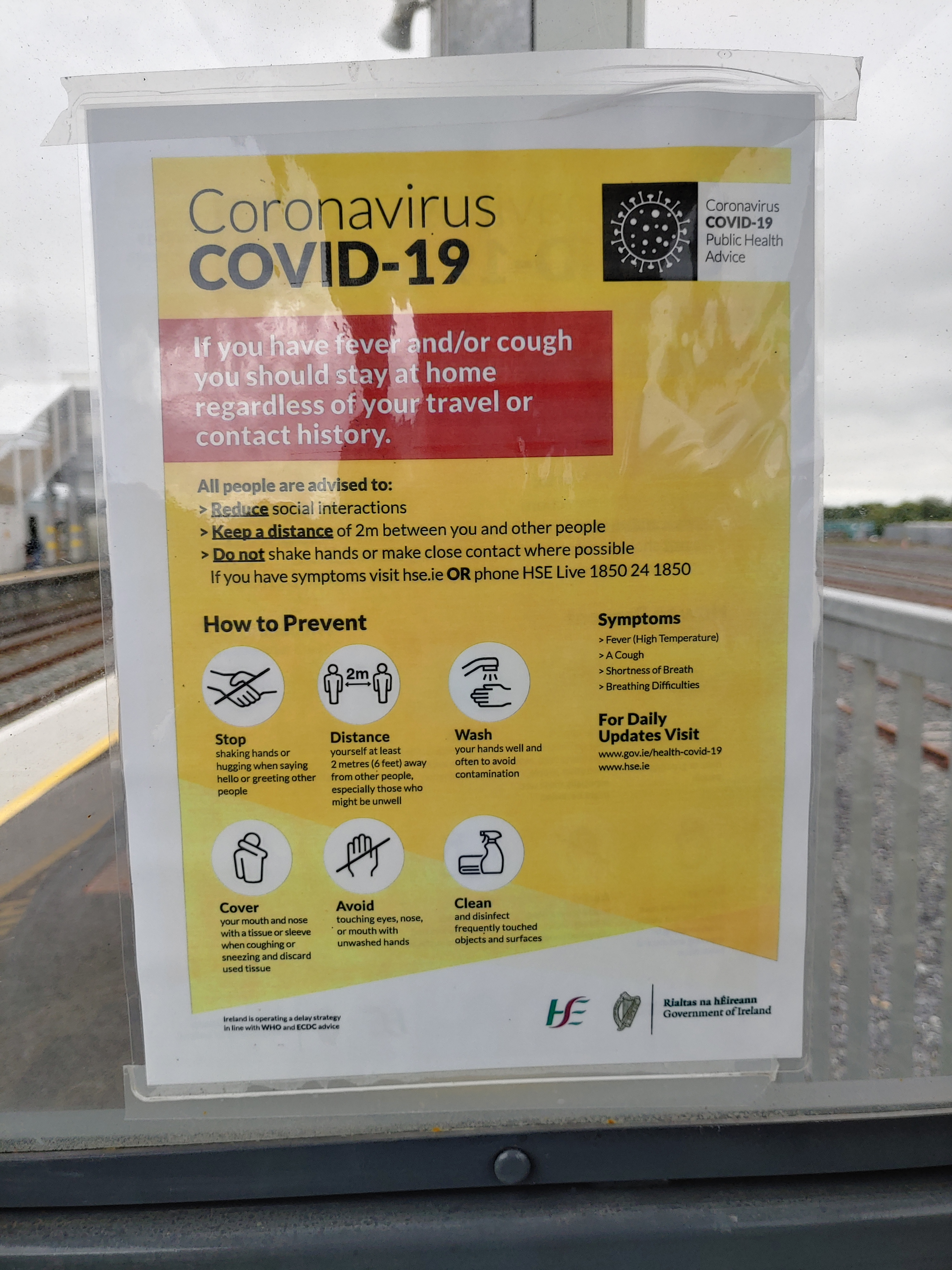
COVID-19 travel warning sign at Limerick Junction railway station

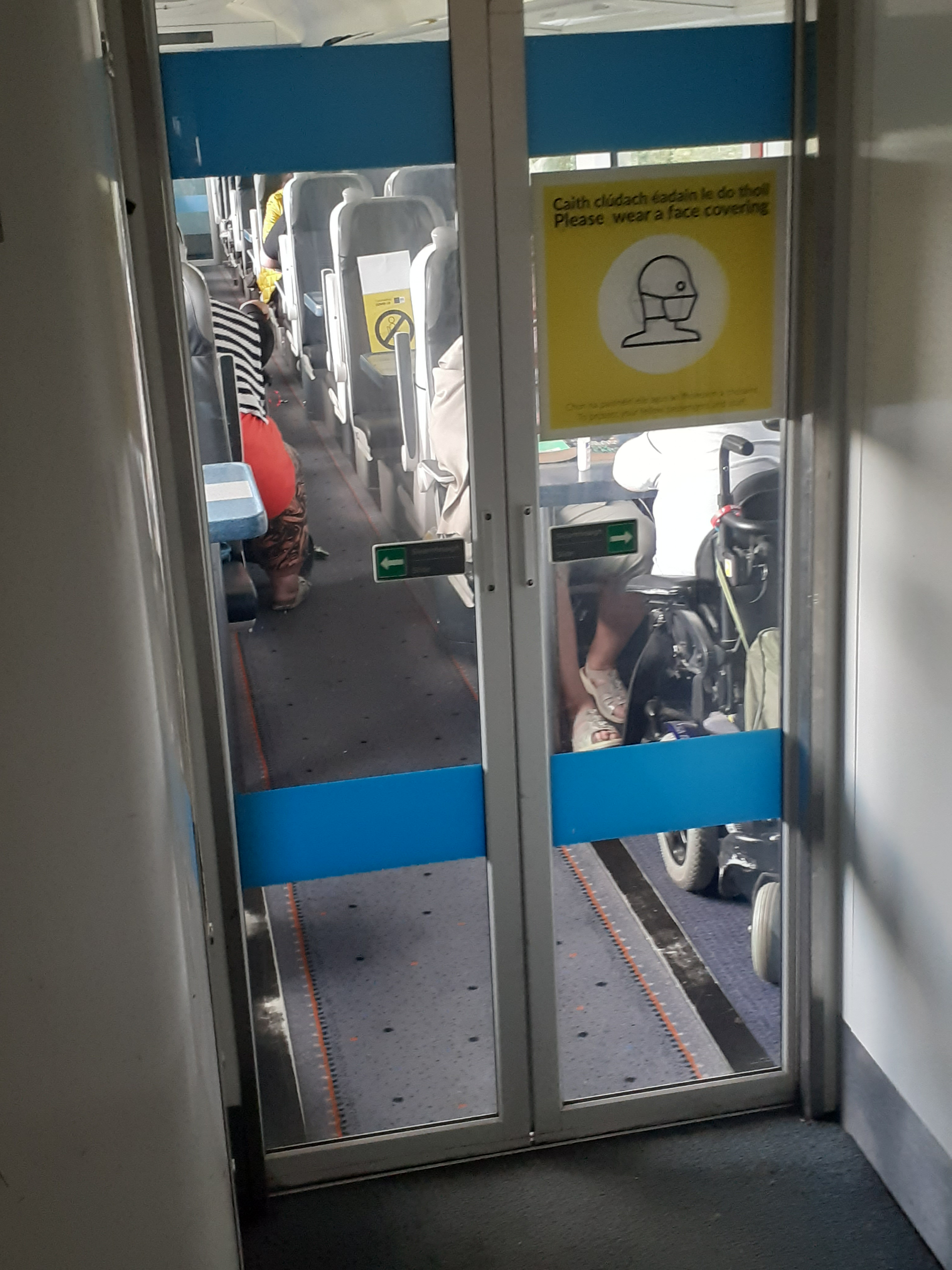
COVID-19 sign on an Inter-City Iarnród Éireann train

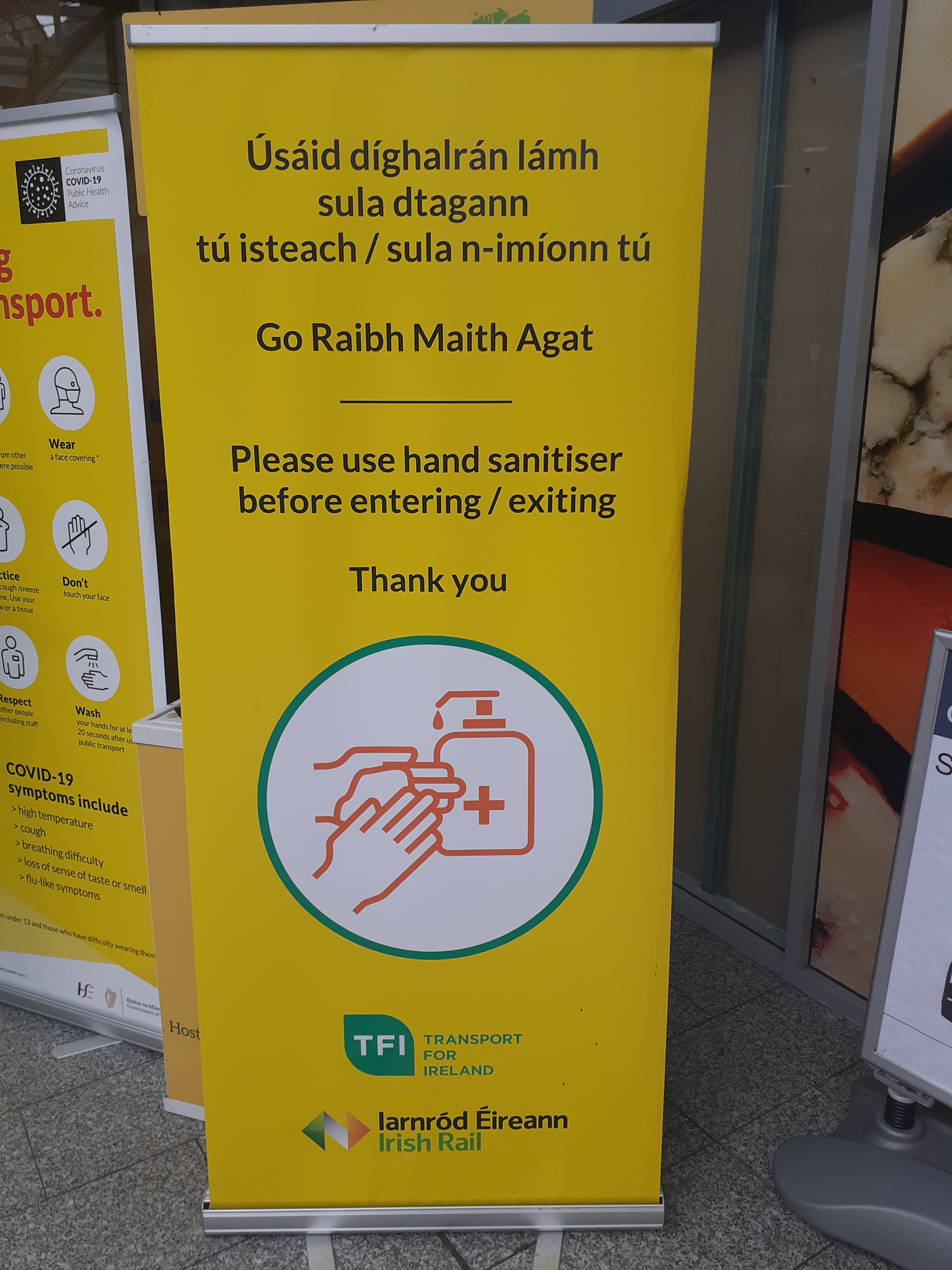
COVID-19 sign at Heuston Station, Dublin

On 27 March 2020, the National Transport Authority announced that operators of public transport services were to move to a new schedule of services on a phased basis from 30 March. Revised timetables for Iarnród Éireann came into effect on 30 March, while those for Dublin Bus, Go-Ahead Ireland and Bus Éireann, came into effect on 1 April. Under the revised timetables, services ran at approximately 80% of current levels. Many public transport timetables returned to normal by 29 June, but social distancing requirements meant that overall passenger capacity remained restricted. Dublin Bus Nitelink services were intermittently paused between March 2020 and January 2022.

On 10 July, the Minister for Health Stephen Donnelly signed regulations to make the wearing of face coverings mandatory on public transport, which came into effect on 13 July. Those who refused to comply to regulations could face fines of up to €2,500 and a possible jail sentence of six months. Figures from the National Transport Authority showed levels of compliance of between 70% and 95% on buses, trains and trams. Bus Éireann reported a compliance rate of 95% on its services, Iarnród Éireann said it was 90%, Dublin Bus reported a rate of about 80% and Luas said it was between 75% and 80%.

On 21 July, the Department of Health announced that face shields would be accepted as an alternative to a face covering on public transport.

On 14 January 2021, the National Transport Authority announced that reduced timetables for bus operators in Dublin—including Dublin Bus and Go-Ahead Ireland—would recommence from Monday 18 January and would run at 80% capacity.

Under the Government's plan for easing most COVID-19 restrictions by 22 October, public transport began operating at 100% capacity across the country from 1 September. On the 28 February 2022, the legal requirement to wear face coverings ended on public transport moving to a recommendation as opposed to a requirement.

It meant in 2020 and 2021 the reopening of all closed railway line along the island of Ireland had to be postponed.
