= ShareAction =

British charity organization

- Founded: 2005
- Type: Charity
- Purpose: Environmentalism, social responsibility, corporate governance, human rights, pension funds, socially responsible investing
- Location: London
- Method: Lobbying, research, education, shareholder activism
- Key people: Catherine Howarth, Chief Executive
- Website: shareaction.org

ShareAction is a London-based charity that aims to improve corporate behaviour on environmental, social and governance issues. It has launched numerous campaigns and has been commended in the Charity Awards three times, most recently in 2015 for its AGM Army project.

Its current Chief Executive is Catherine Howarth.

== History ==
In the 1990s a campaign called 'Ethics for USS' led by the student network People & Planet aimed to make the Universities Superannuation Scheme listen to members' concerns about the scheme's investments. As a result, USS became the first pension fund to formally adopt a socially responsible and sustainable investment policy. This led to the establishment of FairPensions, a national organisation promoting responsible investment; the organisation rebranded itself as ShareAction in 2013.

Early campaigns included 'Patents v Patients' in 2007, a campaign to stop pharmaceutical company Novartis' legal challenge against India's patent law to develop generic drugs. ShareAction worked with Oxfam to mobilise savers and institutional investors to put pressure on the company; in August 2007, Novartis dropped its appeal.

In 2006, ShareAction published its first survey of pension schemes, examining the existence and transparency of investment policies on environmental, social and governance issues. The charity has since published many surveys ranking both pension funds and asset managers on such issues.

In 2010 ShareAction co-ordinated shareholder resolutions at BP and Shell, asking them to publish details of the risks associated with their controversial tar sands project in Canada. Over 6000 supporters emailed their pension funds asking them to support the resolutions; consequently, an unprecedented number of shareholders went against the companies' recommendations to vote against the resolutions, sparking conversations between investors, companies and savers. The campaign was a turning point in the use of 'pension power' to effect change.

== Policy & research ==
ShareAction regularly publishes research on issues relating to responsible investment. This includes reports which provide independent analysis and help shape public policy debate. In July 2015, ShareAction published a report outlining its vision for UK workplace pensions which called for less regulation and better member representation.

The charity also undertakes industry surveys which examine and rank the responsible investment performance of the UK's largest pension funds and fund managers. These surveys provide independent analysis and have become respected industry benchmarks. ShareAction’s latest survey examined how frequently asset managers sided with company management advice on controversial decisions such as pay in 2014.
