= Brian Wren =

English hymn-poet and writer

Brian A. Wren (born 1936 in Romford, Essex, England) is an internationally published hymn-poet and writer. Wren's hymns appear in hymnals of all Christian traditions and have been influential in raising the awareness of theology in hymns. Brian Wren is married to Rev. Susan M. Heafield, a United Methodist pastor.

== Career ==
Wren served in the British Army for two years (1955–1957) and then received a B.A in Modern Languages from Oxford University (1960), a B.A. in Theology from Oxford University (1962), a D.Phil. in theology of Old Testament from Oxford University (1968), and an honorary Doctorate in Humane Letters from Christian Theological Seminary, Indianapolis (2004). His D.Phil. thesis was titled The language of prophetic eschatology in the Old Testament. He was ordained in 1965 in what is now the United Reformed Church, and initially served as the minister of Hockley and Hawkwell Congregational Church, Essex, England (1965–1970).

He then served as the Consultant for adult education for the Churches’ Committee on World Development (1970–1975), the Coordinator of Third World First (now known as People and Planet), and was a member of the Executive Board of the UK Aid Charity, War on Want (1976–1983). He returned to ministry as a free-lance minister (1983–2000) before becoming the Conant Professor of Worship at Columbia Theological Seminary, Decatur, GA, USA (2000–2007). In 2007, Wren retired from Columbia Theological Seminary and was named professor emeritus.

== Thought ==
Wren has written a number of hymns, books, and articles focused around worship. His hymns are published and used around the world in a variety of hymnals. Wren has published seven hymn collections totaling 250 hymns, as well as collections of worship songs for congregations, published by Choristers Guild, which was created with his partner-in-marriage Rev. Susan Heafield. Wren was the runner up in the international Millennium Hymn Competition awarded in February at St Paul's Cathedral, London. His hymn Hidden Christ, Alive For Ever was sung at St Paul's on January 9, 2000 as part of the Cathedral's 'Millennium gift to the nation'.

Wren has been a strong proponent of the view that hymns are poetry and theology, instead of simply music. He has stated, "a hymn is a poem, and a poem is a visual art form. The act of reading a hymn aloud helps to recover its poetry and its power to move us—the power of language, image, metaphor, and faith-expression." It is through this power that he defined theology, in his book Praying Twice: The Music and Words of Congregational Song, as "done when anyone attempts, by artistic skill and creativity, the interplay of intellect and imagination, and/or the methods of reasoned enquiry, to grasp, know and understand the meaning of God’s creating, self-disclosing and liberating activity centered and uniquely focused in Jesus Christ."

A major part of Wren's work has been with inclusive language as well. In 1978, he began to look more closely at "he-man language" and began using language inclusive of women and oppressed or subordinate groups in his hymns. He has since sought to challenge the church to adopt this inclusive mindset. He writes that the vocation of a poet in the church is not only "to write poems of faith which people will pick up and sing," but also "to speak truth by stepping beyond the church's limits of comfort and convention".

== Publications ==
- In God Rejoice! (Stainer & Bell Ltd.) 2012.
- Contemporary Prayers for Public Worship (Contributor), Edited by Caryl Micklem (London: SCM Press and Grand Rapids: Eerdmans), 1967.
- Education for Justice (London: SCM Press and New York: Orbis), 1977.
- What Language Shall I Borrow? - God-Talk in Worship: A Male Response to Feminist Theology (New York: Crossroad, and London: SCM Press) 1989.
- Piece Together Praise - A Theological Journey: Poems & Collected Hymns Thematically Arranged (Stainer & Bell (London UK) and Hope Publishing (Illinois USA), Words only, with complete indexes) 1996.
- Praying Twice: The Music and Words of Congregational Song (Louisville: Westminster John Kox Press), 2000.
- Advent, Christmas and Epiphany: Liturgies and Prayers for Public Worship (Westminster John Knox Press) 2008.
- Hymns for Today (Westminster John Knox Press) 2009.
- Love's Open Door: Hymns and Songs 2004-2008 (Hope Publishing Company USA and Stainer & Bell (London UK) 2009.
- We Can Be Messengers - Worship Songs: Christmas, Before, and After (2001).
- Tell the Good News! - Worship Songs: Easter, Before, and After (2002).

== Hymn collections ==
- Faith Looking Forward 1983.
- Praising a Mystery (30 New Hymns), 1986
- Bring Many Names (35 New Hymns and 3 Doxologies) 1989.
- New Beginnings (30 New Hymns for the 90's) 1993.
- Faith Renewed (rewrites from 1983 collection, Faith Looking Forward).
- Visions and Revisions (33 New Hymns and Seven Reissues) 1997.
- Christ Our Hope (32 New Hymns and Six Reissues) 2004.
- Love's Open Door: Hymns and Songs 2004-2008 (Hope Publishing Company USA and Stainer & Bell, London UK) 2009.
