= The People & Planet Green League =

The People & Planet Green League is the only comprehensive and independent ranking of United Kingdom universities by environmental and ethical performance and practice. It is compiled by the student campaign group People & Planet. From 2007 to 2010 the Green League was published annually in the Times Higher Education Supplement, but since 2011 it has been published in The Guardian.

== History ==
The People & Planet Green League was first published in 2007, as a way of driving forward environmental performance within the university sector. The People & Planet Green League publicly benchmarks the sector's green credentials by combining universities' estates performance data with information about their environmental policies and management practices.

It initially scored UK universities on four key institutional factors needed to drive forward significant and sustained improvement in environmental performance, as highlighted by the Going Green report. These criteria were:

- The active, public support of senior university management (in particular the vice-chancellor or principal) for a programme of environmental performance improvement.
- Full-time staff dedicated to environmental management.
- A comprehensive review to investigate all the environmental impacts of the institution.
- A written, publicly available environmental policy.

Published each year in affiliation with a national newspaper, the People & Planet Green League aims to boost the national profile of environmental management in higher education by celebrating and sharing best practice and exposing inaction.

== Methodology ==
The People & Planet Green League adapts and modifies its methodology each year. The aim of this process is to respond to new environmental concerns, push transition further and incorporate feedback and criticism from previous years to improve the accuracy and transparency of the Green League.

In 2012, the Green League measured universities according to 13 key indicators:

- whether or not the institution has a publicly available environmental policy
- the number of full-time equivalent (FTE) Environmental Management posts per 5,000 FTE students
- environmental auditing
- ethical investment
- carbon management
- ethical procurement and Fairtrade status
- sustainable food
- staff and student engagement
- sustainable development in the curriculum
- energy sources
- waste and recycling
- reduction in carbon emissions
- water-use reduction

Universities are awarded a 'First', '2:1', '2:2' or 'Third' rating dependent upon performance.

== Previous Green Leagues ==
Year	Published in	Greenest University
2012	The Guardian	University of Greenwich
2011	The Guardian	Nottingham Trent University
2010	Times Higher Education Supplement	University of Plymouth
2009	Times Higher Education Supplement	Nottingham Trent University
2008	Times Higher Education Supplement	University of Gloucestershire
2007	Times Higher Education Supplement	Leeds Metropolitan University

=== Awards & response ===
In 2012, the Green League was shortlisted for a Green Gown award.

The Green League 2007 received critical acclaim following its publication. The World Wide Fund for Nature (WWF) awarded The People & Planet Green League with a British Environment and Media Award for Best Campaign. The WWF said of The Green League 2007 that: "It succeeded in dragging environmental issues from the fringes and making them a central concern for many Vice Chancellors."

The Green League received praise from Chris Huhne when Secretary of State for Energy and Climate Change:

The Green League throws a spotlight onto the work being done in universities to cut emissions, and I hope it will encourage universities and students to redouble their efforts in the fight against climate change. It is the students in universities today who will be carrying on the work to build the low-carbon Britain of tomorrow, and it is vital that universities and Government set a good example.

=== Criticisms ===
The methodology has been criticised for not fully incorporating all factors that can contribute to an institution's sustainability; for instance schemes soon to be implemented.

The ranking also did not incorporate the amount of Environmental Research and Teaching, which while not directly contributing to any reduction in the university's carbon footprint, does serve to educate the next generation, and may reveal a new way to increase sustainability. However, a high level of environment research does not seem to correlate with a sustainable university (for instance, Aberystwyth University, which runs a number of courses on Environmental Management, but gained only 97th position in the Green League). The University of Greenwich is another institution which believed that the criteria for marking was too limited, and following several criticms Green League acknowledged that it needed to expand its indicators, which it has done in the following years.

Another criticism is that much of the information is reliant on the institutions faithfulness; People and Planet did not have the resources to mount an independent audit.

These criticisms have largely been addressed by People and Planet, and this can be seen in the amendments which have been made in the measuring criteria which now includes many new areas of assessment which do address other areas of a universities environment.
