= The British Environment and Media Awards =

British Environment and Media Awards (BEMAs)
- Description: Recognizing excellence in UK environmental journalism and campaigning
- Country: United Kingdom
- Presented by: World Wide Fund for Nature (WWF)
- Website: www.wwf.org.uk

The British Environment and Media Awards, or BEMAs, were created by Media Natura, and are awarded by the World Wide Fund for Nature. The awards are open to any professional article, programme, website or campaign, written, produced or undertaken in the UK. Past hosts have included Angus Deayton, and Michael Fish.

In 2007, the year the awards became carbon neutral, winners included:

- The Guardian newspaper
- The Financial Times's Fiona Harvey for exposing corruption in the carbon offset market
- The BBC News at Ten for its coverage of climate change
- The student organisation People & Planet for its university environmental performance table, the Green League

Some of the award's sponsors, which include the RSPB, have attracted some condemnation, such as Surfers Against Sewage protest at the 2007 awards where they handed Northumbrian Water a gold toilet-brush for "showing a disregard to the health of the marine environment". Northumbrian Water however insist they are "the leading environmental company in the North East", having "invested some £2 billion on environmental and service improvements since 1990".

== See also ==
- Environmental journalism
- List of environmental awards
