= People & Planet =

Network of student action groups in the United Kingdom

- Founded: 1969 as 'Third World First'
- Type: Company Limited by Guarantee and Charity registered in England & Wales and Scotland.
- Purpose: Student activism, poverty, human rights and environmentalism
- Location: Oxford, UK
- Region served: UK
- Method: Lobbying, protest, direct action
- Revenue: £380,000 Pound Sterling (2010–11)
- Volunteers: 20,000+ members of their primary mailing list
- Website: peopleandplanet.org

People & Planet is a network of student campaign groups in the UK. It is "the largest student campaigning organisation in the country campaigning to alleviate world poverty, defend human rights and protect the environment."

== Organisation ==
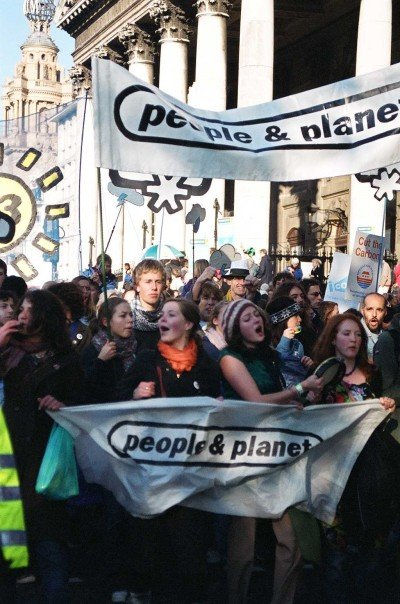
People & Planet members at the Carnival of Climate Chaos, part of Shared Planet 2006

People & Planet is Britain's largest student network campaigning on global poverty, human rights, and the environment. The network has over 2,000 active members at 50 universities and 79 schools and colleges across the UK.

People & Planet groups are autonomous and there is no formal membership system. The organisation is overseen by a Board of Trustees, the majority of whom are student members elected by the network. The support office, based in Oxford, provides training, outreach and resources to support groups and campaigns.

People & Planet is funded primarily by grants from trusts and foundations. People & Planet has a Fundraising and Activist Network allowing members to make regular monthly donations that provide invaluable unrestricted income to support the organisation's work.

== History ==
The organisation was founded in 1969 as Third World First by a group of students at Oxford University, supported by NGOs including Oxfam. In 1997, the network voted to change the name to People & Planet.

Third World First was instrumental in setting up the magazine, The Internationalist, which was later reincarnated as the now popular activist-magazine, New Internationalist.

== Campaigns ==
People & Planet's current campaign areas are climate action and the rights of migrants.

=== Migrants' rights ===
In 2015, People & Planet students democratically decided to introduce a migrants' rights campaign at annual summer camp Power Shift: Training for Change. Staff worked with students to develop the Undoing Borders campaign, launched in 2016.

=== Climate change ===
Currently, People & Planet are running a "Fossil Free Careers" campaign calling on UK universities careers' services to "end recruitment pipelines into the oil, gas and mining industries." As of June 2023, 4 universities had committed to Fossil Free Careers: Wrexham Glyndwr University, The University of Bedfordshire, University of the Arts London and Bishops Grosseteste University. 15 Students' Unions have also agreed to boycott oil and gas recruitment events.

In 2013, the People & Planet network launched a new campaign targeting the fossil fuel industry, and in particular the role of fossil fuels. Working in partnership with 350.org, the Fossil Free UK campaign aims to sever the links between the fossil fuel industry and UK universities. These links include investments and endowments, academic research, sponsorship and partnership arrangements.

In 2017, People & Planet introduced a new climate campaign targeting high-street banks over their financing of fossil fuels. Divest Barclays took particular aim at Barclays due to its status as the worst bank in Europe for providing finance to fossil fuel projects and companies. Students campaigned for universities and students' unions to boycott Barclays and took direct-action targeting Barclays' AGMs in 2018 and 2019.

People & Planet's previous climate change campaign, Going Greener aimed to create 'Transition Universities'. It brings together a student movement on campus working towards low-carbon, resilient and community-led education institutions that achieve carbon emissions reductions of at least 50% by 2020.

=== Past successes and campaigns ===
People & Planet activists have played a key role in action for social and environmental justice across a variety of campaigns.

- Largely due to pressure from People & Planet groups, there are now over 100 Fairtrade universities and 106 Fairtrade secondary schools.
- The Ethics for USS (the University Superannuation Scheme) campaign persuaded the £20 billion lecturers’ pension fund to adopt a socially responsible investment policy. The legacy of the campaign was the founding of charity FairPensions (now ShareAction).
- People & Planet supported the world's largest ever garment boycott, which led to the establishment of the first recognised garment union in Honduras & 1200 factory workers being re-employed.
- The Treat Aids Now campaign persuaded the UK government to lead an international commitment to provide HIV/AIDS treatment for all by 2010.
- As part of the Jubilee 2000 campaign, People & Planet and other groups secured $88bn debt cancellation for the world's poor.
- The Buy Right campaign, focusing on defending human rights within university supply chains. Universities are being encouraged to sign up to the Worker Rights Consortium, an independent monitoring organisation that supports workers in the garment industry in defending their workplace rights.
- People & Planet was involved in setting up a new organisation, Electronics Watch, which will performed similar monitoring function in the Electronics sector. The associated Sweatshop Free campaign asked universities to affiliate to Electronics Watch.

== The People & Planet University League ==
People & Planet's University League is the only comprehensive and independent ranking of UK universities by environmental and ethical performance. In 2019, the People & Planet University League was published in The Guardian.

The People & Planet Green League was first published in 2007, as a way of driving forward environmental performance within the university sector. The People & Planet University League publicly benchmarks the sector's green credentials by combining universities' estates performance data with information about their environmental policies and management practices.

It initially scored UK universities on four key institutional factors needed to drive forward significant and sustained improvement in environmental performance, as highlighted by the Going Green report. These criteria were:

- The active, public support of senior university management for a programme of environmental performance improvement.
- Full-time staff dedicated to environmental management.
- A comprehensive review to investigate all the environmental impacts of the institution, and performance monitoring.
- A written, publicly available environmental policy.

Since the first Green League in 2007, People & Planet has widened the criteria to assess both policy and performance of higher education institutions.

The University League is widely credited with shifting the UK's Higher Education sector towards improved environmental management and performance. In 2012, People & Planet awarded 46 First Class awards in the University League, compared to just 15 in 2007. Notable improvements have been measured in areas such as the proportion of renewable electricity used by universities (72%, up from 12% in 2007) and in the number of Fairtrade Universities (112, up from 41 in 2007).

In 2012, People & Planet held its first ever Green League Graduation Ceremony in Westminster, celebrating the achievements of its top-ranking universities.

=== Awards and Praise ===
The Green League won "Best Campaign" at the 2007 British Environment and Media Awards.

The People & Planet Green League has been shortlisted for the Green Gown Awards, administered by the Environmental Association for Universities and Colleges (EAUC).

== Notable people ==
- Guy Hughes (1974–2006) was head of People & Planet's Campaigns until 2004 when, following the outbreak of war in Iraq, he set up Crisis Action, a UK initiative to help co-ordinate NGO responses to crisis situations.
- The environmental campaigner and journalist George Monbiot is patron of People & Planet.
- Former members include Mark Lazarowicz, MP; Catherine Stihler, MEP (alumna and 52nd Rector at the University of St Andrews); and Mark Ballard, former MSP and Rector (at the University of Edinburgh) where the People & Planet group was instrumental in his election in 2006, against a field including Magnus Linklater, Boris Johnson and John Pilger.
- The internationally published hymn writer and theologian Brian Wren is a former Coordinator of People & Planet.
