= McElhinney's =

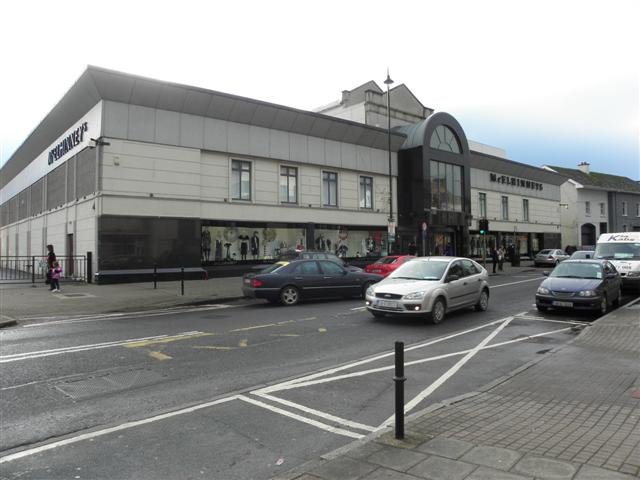
- Company type: Department store
- Founded: 1971
- Founder: John McElhinney
- Headquarters: Ballybofey, County Donegal
- Number of locations: One
- Key people: John McElhinney
- Owner: John McElhinney
- Number of employees: Over 200
- Website: www.mcelhinneys.com

McElhinney's is a 3-storey fifteen-department store located in Ballybofey, County Donegal. It is the largest department store in Ireland outside Dublin. It has been named National Retail Store of the Year and Best Superstore at the Retail Excellence Ireland Awards, among other awards for Outstanding Customer Service, Occasionwear, Bridal and more. Alongside Finn Park, MacCumhaill Park and a few hotels, McElhinney's is one of Ballybofey's more recognisable landmarks.

There is another store with the same name in County Meath but there is no connection between that and McElhinney's of Ballybofey.

== History ==
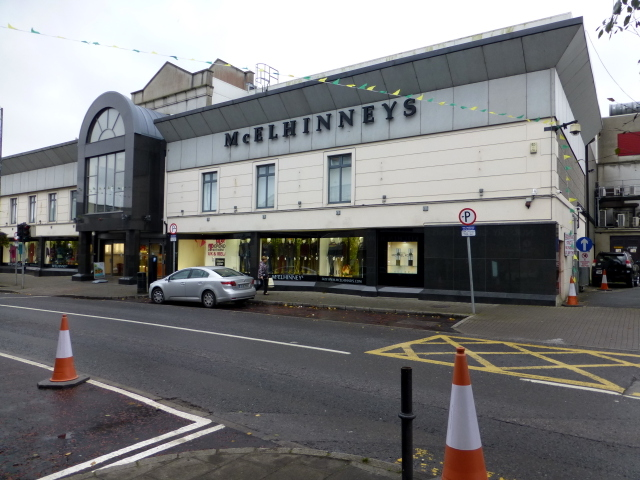

McElhinney's was founded by John McElhinney in 1968. John McElhinney spent his time driving around Donegal selling his wares from the back of a van. In 1971, he established a small shop in Glenfin Street, Ballybofey, from which he operated for eight years before opening the current Department Store on Lower Main Street in 1979. The current business has faced adversity throughout the years, including surviving both a flood in 1985, and firebomb attack in 1987.

In 1977, the store began to sell Wedding Dresses. The Bridal Rooms have been nominated and won multiple awards including; Best Bridal Retailer 2016 by Xposé Frockadvisor Awards, Bridalwear Supplier of the Year 2016 by Weddings Online Awards, and Wedding Boutique of the Year (Borders) at The Irish Wedding Awards 2017, among many others.
