= Von Krockow =

von Krockow is a surname. Notable people with the surname include:

- Anton von Krockow (1714–1778), Prussian lieutenant general
- Christian Graf von Krockow (1927–2002), German writer and political scientist
- de:Joachim Ernst von Krockow, Generalwachtmeister during the thirty years war.
- Peter von Krockow (1935–2018), German fencer
- Milla von Krockow (born 1986/1987), German fashion model
