= List of Germany's Next Topmodel contestants =

This is a list of contestants who have appeared on the German reality television series Germany's Next Topmodel. Hosted by model Heidi Klum and her panel of judges. A number of aspiring models compete to win a modeling contract with a top modeling agency, along with other prizes.

The series first aired on January 25, 2006, and as of 2026, twenty-one seasons have aired. A total of 595 contestants have been selected as finalists in the show in its twenty-one years running, with 500 eliminations (468 eliminations from the main panel and 32 eliminations from outside of panel), 47 withdrawals and 2 disqualifications.

A total of twenty-four models (Lena Gercke, Barbara Meier, Jennifer Hof, Sara Nuru, Alisar Ailabouni, Jana Beller, Luisa Hartema, Lovelyn Enebechi, Stefanie Giesinger, Vanessa Fuchs, Kim Hnizdo, Céline Bethmann, Toni Dreher-Adenuga, Simone Kowalski, Jacqueline Wruck, Alex-Mariah Peter, Lou-Anne Gleissenebner, Vivien Blotzki, Lea Oude Engberink, Jermaine Kokoú Kothé, Moritz Rüdiger, Daniela Djokić, Aurélie Siewitz, and Ibo Ouro Bodi) crowned "Germany's Next Topmodel".

Contestants from all over Europe with German descent may apply to be on the show through casting calls, but the series has been known to recruit contestants from a myriad of various methods. In more recent years of the show, the production team has taken to scouting for contestants on various social media platforms, like Instagram or TikTok.

== Contestants ==
The contestant placed third.
The contestant placed as runner-up.
The contestant won the competition.

Contestant	Age (Note: Contestant's ages are at the time of the season's filming.)	Country	Place	Season
Andrea Lichtenberg	19	Germany	12th/11th	Season 1
Anne Mühlmer	17	Germany	12th/11th	Season 1
Céline Roscheck	22	Austria	10th (quit)	Season 1
Rahel Krüger	20	Germany	9th	Season 1
Micaela Schäfer	22	Germany	8th	Season 1
Luise Mikulla	16	Germany	7th	Season 1
Charlotte Offeney	18	Germany	6th/5th	Season 1
Lena Meier	20	Germany	6th/5th	Season 1
Janina Ortmann	20	Greece	4th	Season 1
Jennifer Wanderer	17	Germany	3rd	Season 1
Yvonne Schröder (Note: The contestant participated in Die Model WG, a spin-off from GNTM.)	17	Germany	Runner-up	Season 1
Lena Gercke	17	Germany	Winner	Season 1
Sophie Dahl	17	Germany	17th/16th (quit)	Season 2
Alina Maier	16	Germany	17th/16th (quit)	Season 2
Janine Mackenroth	18	Germany	15th	Season 2
Enyerlina Sanchez	25	Dominican Republic	14th/13th	Season 2
Antje Pötke	22	Germany	14th/13th	Season 2
Janina Küpper	21	Germany	12th	Season 2
Alla Kosovan	18	Germany	11th	Season 2
Denise Dahinten	19	Germany	10th	Season 2
Tonia Michaely	19	Germany	9th/8th	Season 2
Aneta Tober	21	Germany	9th/8th	Season 2
Michaella 'Milla' von Krockow	20	Germany	7th	Season 2
Anja Platzer	19	Austria	6th	Season 2
Mandy Graff	18	Luxembourg	5th/4th	Season 2
Fiona Erdmann	18	Germany	5th/4th	Season 2
Hana Nitsche	21	Germany	3rd	Season 2
Anne-Kathrin 'Anni' Wendler	21	Germany	Runner-up	Season 2
Barbara Meier	20	Germany	Winner	Season 2
Sandra Korte	22	Germany	19th-17th	Season 3
Rubina Radwanski	20	Germany	19th-17th	Season 3
Aisha Grone	16	Germany	19th-17th	Season 3
Tainá Santos Silva	18	Germany	16th/15th	Season 3
Aline Tausch	20	Germany	16th/15th	Season 3
Elena Rotter	20	Austria	14th	Season 3
Katharina Harms	18	Germany	13th/12th	Season 3
Gina-Lisa Lohfink	21	Germany	13th/12th	Season 3
Bianca Schumacher	20	Germany	11th	Season 3
Sophia Maus	19	Germany	10th	Season 3
Vanessa Hegelmaier	20	Germany	9th (quit)	Season 3
Sarah Knappik	21	Germany	8th	Season 3
Raquel Alvarez	22	Switzerland	7th	Season 3
Gisele Oppermann	20	Germany	6th	Season 3
Wanda Badwal	23	Germany	5th/4th	Season 3
Carolin Ruppert	24	Germany	5th/4th	Season 3
Christina Leibold	21	Germany	3rd	Season 3
Janina Schmidt	23	Germany	Runner-up	Season 3
Jennifer Hof	16	Germany	Winner	Season 3
Olivia Bermann	20	Germany	17th-15th	Season 4
Johanna Popp	21	Germany	17th-15th	Season 4
Daphne Braun	17	Germany	17th-15th	Season 4
Tessa Bergmeier	19	Germany	14th	Season 4
Dana Franke	20	Germany	13th	Season 4
Tamara Busch	16	Germany	12th/11th	Season 4
Aline Bauer	19	Germany	12th/11th	Season 4
Stefanie Theissing	21	Germany	10th	Season 4
Katrina Scharinger	19	Germany	9th	Season 4
Larissa Marolt (Note: Larissa Marolt previously competed in the first season of Austria's Next Topmodel, where she was the winner and automatically secured a place among the final cast.)	16	Austria	8th	Season 4
Ira Meindl	21	Germany	7th	Season 4
Sarina Nowak	16	Germany	6th	Season 4
Maria Beckmann	19	Germany	5th/4th	Season 4
Jessica Motzkus	20	Germany	5th/4th	Season 4
Marie Nasemann	19	Germany	3rd	Season 4
Mandy Bork	17	Germany	Runner Up	Season 4
Sara Nuru	19	Germany	Winner	Season 4
Aline Kautz	16	Germany	18th (quit)	Season 5
Petra Roscheck	25	Austria	17th/16th	Season 5
Lena Kaiser	17	Germany	17th/16th	Season 5
Lara Emsen	16	Germany	15th	Season 5
Luisa Krüger	18	Germany	14th	Season 5
Nadine Höcherl	18	Germany	13th/12th	Season 5
Catherine Kropp	17	Germany	13th/12th	Season 5
Miriam Höller	22	Germany	11th	Season 5
Wioleta Psiuk	18	Germany	10th	Season 5
Jacqueline Kohl	16	Germany	9th	Season 5
Viktoria Lantratova	22	Germany	8th	Season 5
Pauline Afaja	19	Germany	7th/6th	Season 5
Leyla Mert	19	Germany	7th/6th	Season 5
Louisa Mazzurana	22	Germany	5th	Season 5
Neele Hehemann	21	Germany	4th	Season 5
Laura Weyel	23	Germany	3rd	Season 5
Hanna Bohnekamp	18	Germany	Runner Up	Season 5
Alisar Ailabouni	20	Austria	Winner	Season 5
Chiara Breder	16	Germany	25th/24th	Season 6
Lilia Doubrovina	16	Germany	25th/24th	Season 6
Valerie Blum	20	Germany	23rd (quit)	Season 6
Concetta Mazza	18	Germany	22nd	Season 6
Ivon Zito	18	Germany	21st	Season 6
Christien Fleischhauer	22	Germany	20th	Season 6
Amira Regaieg	20	Germany	19th	Season 6
Franziska König	18	Germany	18th	Season 6
Simone Rohrmüller	18	Germany	17th	Season 6
Tahnee Keller	20	Germany	16th	Season 6
Natascha Beil	20	Germany	15th/14th	Season 6
Paulina Kaluza	18	Germany	15th/14th	Season 6
Florence Lodevic	22	Luxembourg	13th	Season 6
Isabel Rath	23	Germany	12th/11th	Season 6
Sarah Jülich	19	Germany	12th/11th	Season 6
Joana Damek	20	Germany	10th (quit)	Season 6
Jil Goetz	16	Germany	9th	Season 6
Marie-Luise Schäfer	21	Germany	8th	Season 6
Lisa-Maria Könnecke	16	Germany	7th	Season 6
Sihe Jiang	19	Germany	6th	Season 6
Aleksandra Nagel	21	Germany	5th/4th	Season 6
Anna-Lena Schubert	20	Germany	5th/4th	Season 6
Amelie Klever	16	Germany	3rd	Season 6
Rebecca Mir	19	Germany	Runner Up	Season 6
Jana Beller	20	Germany	Winner	Season 6
Romina Djurovic	16	Germany	25th-23rd	Season 7
Laura Wittek	18	Germany	25th-23rd	Season 7
Abiba Makoya Bakayoko	18	Germany	25th-23rd	Season 7
Isabell Janku	16	Germany	22nd-19th	Season 7
Sabine Snobl	19	Germany	22nd-19th	Season 7
Franziska Pöhling	18	Germany	22nd-19th	Season 7
Valerie-Charlotte Kirchner von Schröder	19	Germany	22nd-19th	Season 7
Anelia Moor	19	Germany	18th	Season 7
Michelle-Luise Lafleur	17	Germany	17th/16th	Season 7
Natalia Kowalczykowska	20	Germany	17th/16th	Season 7
Maxi Böttcher	17	Germany	15th	Season 7
Jasmin Abraha	17	Germany	14th	Season 7
Annabelle Rieß	23	Germany	13th	Season 7
Melek Civantürk	20	Germany	12th	Season 7
Shawny Sander	17	Germany	11th	Season 7
Laura Scharnagl	17	Germany	10th	Season 7
Inga Bobkow	17	Germany	9th	Season 7
Lisa Volz	20	Germany	8th	Season 7
Diana Ovchinnikova	17	Germany	7th (quit)	Season 7
Evelyn Keck	18	Germany	6th (quit)	Season 7
Sara Kulka	21	Germany	5th	Season 7
Katarzyna 'Kasia' Lenhard † (Note: Deceased)	16	Germany	4th	Season 7
Dominique Miller	22	Germany	3rd	Season 7
Sarah-Anessa Hitzschke	18	Germany	Runner Up	Season 7
Luisa Hartema	16	Germany	Winner	Season 7
Clara Zaveta	19	Germany	26th (quit)	Season 8
Katharina Oltzow	16	Germany	25th	Season 8
Merle Lambert	16	Germany	24th (quit)	Season 8
Linda Niewerth	17	Germany	23rd-21st	Season 8
Lisa Quack	17	Germany	23rd-21st	Season 8
Nancy Limonta	22	Germany	23rd-21st	Season 8
Lisa-Giulia Wende	17	Germany	20th	Season 8
Michelle Maas	16	Germany	19th	Season 8
Höpke Voß	19	Germany	18th/17th (quit)	Season 8
Bingyang Liu	18	Germany	18th/17th (quit)	Season 8
Leandra Martin	18	Germany	16th	Season 8
Laura 'Sophie' Jais	23	Germany	15th (quit)	Season 8
Anna-Barbara Seebrecht	17	Germany	14th	Season 8
Jessika Weidner	16	Germany	13th	Season 8
Janna Wiese	19	Germany	12th	Season 8
Veronika Weddeling	23	Germany	11th	Season 8
Jacqueline Thießen	16	Germany	10th	Season 8
Leonie Marwitz	16	Germany	9th	Season 8
Carolin Sünderhauf	20	Germany	8th	Season 8
Christine Gischler	16	Germany	7th	Season 8
Marie Czuczman	16	Germany	6th	Season 8
Anna-Maria Damm	16	Germany	5th	Season 8
Sabrina Elsner	20	Germany	4th	Season 8
Luise Will	18	Germany	3rd	Season 8
Maike van Grieken	20	Germany	Runner Up	Season 8
Lovelyn Enebechi	16	Germany	Winner	Season 8
Jill Schmitz	22	Luxembourg	25th/24th	Season 9
Lisa Seibert	18	Germany	25th/24th	Season 9
Fata Hasanovic	18	Germany	23rd-20th (quit)	Season 9
Ina Bartak	21	Germany	23rd-20th (quit)	Season 9
Laura Hass	19	Germany	23rd-20th (quit)	Season 9
Pauline Cottin	18	Germany	23rd-20th (quit)	Season 9
Franziska Wimmer	17	Germany	19th	Season 9
Laura Kristen	18	Germany	18th	Season 9
Emma Kahlert	16	Germany	17th	Season 9
Antonia Balzer	16	Germany	16th	Season 9
Simona Hartl	17	Germany	15th/14th	Season 9
Jana Heinisch	19	Germany	15th/14th	Season 9
Sainabou Sosseh	16	Germany	13th	Season 9
Lisa Gelbrich	17	Germany	12th	Season 9
Sarah Weinfurter	16	Germany	11th	Season 9
Anna Wilken	17	Germany	10th (quit)	Season 9
Samantha Brock	17	Germany	9th	Season 9
Nancy Nagel	21	Germany	8th	Season 9
Karlin Obiango	17	Germany	7th	Season 9
Aminata Sanogo	18	Germany	6th-4th	Season 9
Nathalie Volk	16	Germany	6th-4th	Season 9
Betty Taube	18	Germany	6th-4th	Season 9
Ivana Teklic	18	Germany	3rd	Season 9
Jolina Fust	17	Germany	Runner-up	Season 9
Stefanie Giesinger	17	Germany	Winner	Season 9
Sarah Kocar	22	Germany	23rd/22nd (quit)	Season 10
Annabel Paasch	16	Germany	23rd/22nd (quit)	Season 10
Laura Weidner	17	Germany	21st/20th	Season 10
Ariana Xhatova	18	Germany	21st/20th	Season 10
Adriane Sutsch	18	Germany	19th	Season 10
Jovana Bulic	18	Belgium	18th-16th	Season 10
Lena Stockhausen	18	Germany	18th-16th	Season 10
Daniela Wolking	22	Germany	18th-16th	Season 10
Irene Pichler	20	Austria	15th/14th	Season 10
Neele Busse	18	Germany	15th/14th	Season 10
Erica Santos Silva	21	Germany	13th	Season 10
Sandy Provazek	20	Germany	12th/11th	Season 10
Varisa Kaluk	20	Austria	12th/11th	Season 10
Laura Dünninger	17	Germany	10th/9th	Season 10
Sara Faste	16	Germany	10th/9th	Season 10
Chiara 'Kiki' Hölzl	17	Austria	8th	Season 10
Jülide 'Jüli' Ürküt	17	Germany	7th/6th	Season 10
Lisa Bärmann	19	Germany	7th/6th	Season 10
Darya Strelnikova	22	Germany	5th	Season 10
Katharina Wandrowsky	19	Germany	4th	Season 10
Ajsa Selimovic	18	Germany	3rd	Season 10
Anuthida Ploypetch	17	Germany	Runner Up	Season 10
Vanessa Fuchs	18	Germany	Winner	Season 10
Luisa Bolghiran	19	Germany	24th (quit)	Season 11
Friederike 'Fred' Riss	17	Germany	23rd/22nd	Season 11
Saskia Böhlcke	18	Germany	23rd/22nd	Season 11
Laura Penelope Baumgärtner	19	Switzerland	21st (quit)	Season 11
Sophie Schweer	19	Germany	20th/19th	Season 11
Shirin Kelly	24	Germany	20th/19th	Season 11
Cindy Unger	20	Germany	18th	Season 11
Jennifer Daschner	17	Germany	17th/16th	Season 11
Laura Bräutigam	16	Germany	17th/16th	Season 11
Christin Götzke	17	Germany	15th/14th	Season 11
Yusra Babekr-Ali	18	Germany	15th/14th	Season 11
Lara-Kristin Bayer	16	Germany	13th	Season 11
Camilla Cavalli	16	Germany	12th	Season 11
Julia Wulf	20	Germany	11th (quit)	Season 11
Laura Franziska Blank	21	Germany	10th	Season 11
Laura Bleicher	19	Germany	9th	Season 11
Luana Florea	19	Romania	8th	Season 11
Elena Kilb	19	Germany	7th	Season 11
Lara Helmer	20	Germany	6th	Season 11
Taynara Silva Wolf	19	Germany	5th	Season 11
Jasmin Lekudere	20	Austria	4th	Season 11
Fata Hasanovic (Note: Fata Hasanovic previously competed in the ninth season of the series, where she placed twenty-third to twentieth.)	20	Germany	3rd	Season 11
Elena Carriere	19	Germany	Runner Up	Season 11
Kim Hnizdo	19	Germany	Winner	Season 11
Saskia Mächler	19	Germany	28th/27th	Season 12
Christina Wiessner	19	Germany	28th/27th	Season 12
Elisa Weihmann	16	Germany	26th/25th	Season 12
Victoria Wanke	17	Germany	26th/25th	Season 12
Claudia Fiedler	22	Germany	24th	Season 12
Milena Ziller	18	Germany	23rd-21st	Season 12
Chaline Bang	16	Germany	23rd-21st	Season 12
Kimberly Pereira	18	Germany	23rd-21st	Season 12
Helena Fritz	18	Switzerland	20th (quit)	Season 12
Aissatou Niang	18	Germany	19th	Season 12
Deborah Lay	21	Germany	18th	Season 12
Melina Budde	19	Germany	17th	Season 12
Neele Bronst	20	Germany	16th	Season 12
Julia Fux (Note: Personality Award winner)	20	Austria	15th	Season 12
Greta Faeser	21	Germany	14th (quit)	Season 12
Julia Steyns	23	Germany	13th	Season 12
Soraya Eckes	17	Germany	12th	Season 12
Giuliana Radermacher	20	Germany	11th	Season 12
Brenda Hübscher	23	Germany	10th	Season 12
Sabine Fischer	23	Germany	9th	Season 12
Anh Phuong Dinh Phan	25	Germany	8th	Season 12
Carina Zavline	19	France	7th	Season 12
Lynn Petertonkoker	18	Germany	6th/5th	Season 12
Maja Manczak	18	Germany	6th/5th	Season 12
Leticia Wala Ntuba	18	Germany	4th	Season 12
Romina Brennecke	20	Germany	3rd	Season 12
Serlina Hohmann	22	Germany	Runner Up	Season 12
Céline Bethmann	18	Germany	Winner	Season 12
Selma Toroy	24	Germany	29th	Season 13
Ivana Rajić Hrnjić	22	Germany	28th (quit)	Season 13
Viktoria Wendell	21	Germany	27th/26th	Season 13
Lania Barzanjil	22	Germany	27th/26th	Season 13
Liane Polt	17	Austria	25th	Season 13
Julia Freimuth	17	Germany	24th	Season 13
Elisabeth 'Lis' Kanzler	22	Germany	23rd/22nd	Season 13
Valerie Wersche	24	Germany	23rd/22nd	Season 13
Karoline Seul	19	Germany	21st	Season 13
Franziska Schwagger	23	Germany	20th/19th	Season 13
Isabella Özdemir	22	Germany	20th/19th	Season 13
Sherezade 'Sarah' Amiri	19	Germany	18th	Season 13
Gerda Sadzeviciute	25	Germany	17th	Season 13
Anne Volkmann	23	Germany	16th	Season 13
Stephanie Groll	19	Germany	15th	Season 13
Shari Streich	23	Germany	14th	Season 13
Abigail Odoom	20	Germany	13th	Season 13
Bruna Rodrigues	24	Germany	12th/11th	Season 13
Victoria Pavlas	19	Austria	12th/11th	Season 13
Zoe Saip	18	Austria	10th	Season 13
Trixi Giese	17	France	9th	Season 13
Klaudia Giez	21	Germany	8th/7th	Season 13
Sara Leutenegger	23	Switzerland	8th/7th	Season 13
Sally Haas	17	Germany	6th	Season 13
Jennifer Michalczyk	22	Germany	5th	Season 13
Christina Peno	21	Germany	4th	Season 13
Pia Riegel	22	Germany	3rd	Season 13
Julianna Townsend	20	Germany	Runner Up	Season 13
Oluwatoniloba 'Toni' Dreher-Adenuga	18	Germany	Winner	Season 13
Anastasiya Baskakova	21	Germany	30th-27th	Season 14
Marlene Donner	19	Germany	30th-27th	Season 14
Debora do Nascimento Goulart	22	Germany	30th-27th	Season 14
Ann-Kathrin Grünewald	20	Germany	30th-27th	Season 14
Olivia Rhode	16	Germany	26th (quit)	Season 14
Maria Wilhauk	19	Germany	25th-22nd	Season 14
Naomi Ufelle	16	Austria	25th-22nd	Season 14
Celine Hamann	19	Germany	25th-22nd	Season 14
Loriane Glocke	24	Germany	25th-22nd	Season 14
Kim Dammer	18	Germany	21st (quit)	Season 14
Joelle Pascai Quednau	23	Germany	20th-18th	Season 14
Melina Lucht	19	Germany	20th-18th	Season 14
Catharina Maranca	19	Germany	20th-18th	Season 14
Leonela Hires	19	Austria	17th	Season 14
Luna Dzek Dukadjinac	21	Germany	16th	Season 14
Enisa Bukvic	24	Germany	15th (quit)	Season 14
Jasmin 'Joy' Cadete Rosado	18	Germany	14th (DQ)	Season 14
Melissa Hemberger	23	Germany	13th	Season 14
Justine Klippenstein	20	Germany	12th	Season 14
Theresia Fischer	26	Germany	11th	Season 14
Julia Helm	23	Germany	10th	Season 14
Lena Lischewski	17	Germany	9th	Season 14
Tatjana Wiedemann	22	Germany	8th	Season 14
Sarah Almoril	20	Germany	7th	Season 14
Caroline Krüger	21	Germany	6th	Season 14
Alicija Köhler	18	Germany	5th	Season 14
Vanessa Stannat	21	Germany	4th (quit)	Season 14
Cäcilia Zimmer	18	Germany	3rd	Season 14
Sayana Ranjan	20	Germany	Runner Up	Season 14
Simone Kowalski	21	Germany	Winner	Season 14
Daria Cupachin	22	Germany	28th-26th	Season 15
Charlotte Steinborn	25	Germany	28th-26th	Season 15
Nina-Sue Wurm	19	Germany	28th-26th	Season 15
Saskia Mächler (Note: Saskia Mächler previously competed in the twelfth season of the series, where she placed twenty-eighth to twenty-seventh.)	22	Germany	25th/24th	Season 15
Malin Blumenthal	21	Germany	25th/24th	Season 15
Alina Enders	23	Germany	23rd-21st	Season 15
Valeria Zock	19	Germany	23rd-21st	Season 15
Laura Schäfer	19	Germany	23rd-21st	Season 15
Cassandra Feliciano	27	Germany	20th/19th	Season 15
Marie Rathay	19	Germany	20th/19th	Season 15
Pinar Aygün	22	Germany	18th/17th	Season 15
Sarah Sonko	23	Germany	18th/17th	Season 15
Lucy Hellenbrecht	21	Germany	16th	Season 15
Mareike Lerch	24	Germany	15th (quit)	Season 15
Julia Figueroa	20	Germany	14th	Season 15
Johanna Höpfler	20	Germany	13th	Season 15
Bianca Eigenfield	18	Germany	12th	Season 15
Julia Przybylski	17	Germany	11th	Season 15
Nadine Wimmer	20	Germany	10th	Season 15
Vivian Cole	21	Germany	9th	Season 15
Maribel Sancia Todt	18	Germany	8th	Season 15
Larissa Neumann	19	Germany	7th	Season 15
Tamara Hitz	19	Austria	6th	Season 15
Anastasia 'Nastya' Borisova	20	Germany	5th	Season 15
Lijana Kaggwa	23	Germany	4th (quit)	Season 15
Maureen Ugodi	20	Austria	3rd	Season 15
Sarah Posch	20	Austria	Runner Up	Season 15
Jacqueline 'Jacky' Wruck	21	Germany	Winner	Season 15
Franziska Bergander	24	Germany	31st-26th	Season 16
Maria-Sophie Damasio	19	Germany	31st-26th	Season 16
Vanessa Gros	21	Germany	31st-26th	Season 16
Alexandra Reinke	21	Germany	31st-26th	Season 16
Samantha Herbst	21	Germany	31st-26th	Season 16
Lena Schreiber	21	Germany	31st-26th	Season 16
Ricarda Häschke	21	Germany	25th (quit)	Season 16
Anna-Maria 'Maria' Schimanski	21	Germany	24th	Season 16
Sara Ullmann	20	Germany	23rd (quit)	Season 16
Nana Fofana	19	Germany	22nd	Season 16
Mira Folster	19	Germany	21st (quit)	Season 16
Sarah Ahrend	22	Germany	20th	Season 16
Amina Hotait	21	Germany	19th	Season 16
Miriam Rautert	24	Germany	18th	Season 16
Chanel Silberberg	21	Germany	17th	Season 16
Jasmine Jüttner	21	Austria	16th (quit)	Season 16
Alysha Hübner	19	Germany	15th	Season 16
Linda Braunberger	20	Germany	14th	Season 16
Mareike Müller	25	Germany	13th	Season 16
Romy Wolf	19	Germany	12th (quit)	Season 16
Larissa Onac	22	Germany	11th	Season 16
Elisa Schattenberg	20	Germany	10th	Season 16
Ana Martinovic	20	Germany	9th	Season 16
Angelina 'Luca' Vanak	19	Germany	8th	Season 16
Liliana Maxwell	21	Germany	7th	Season 16
Yasmin Boulaghmal	19	Germany	6th	Season 16
Ashley Amegan	21	Germany	5th (quit)	Season 16
Romina Palm	21	Germany	4th	Season 16
Soulin Omar	20	Germany	3rd	Season 16
Dascha Carriero	21	Germany	Runner Up	Season 16
Alex-Mariah Peter	23	Germany	Winner	Season 16
Emilie Clement	19	Switzerland	31st-29th	Season 17
Meline Kermut	20	Germany	31st-29th	Season 17
Pauline Schäfer	18	Germany	31st-29th	Season 17
Kim Bieder	20	Germany	28th/27th	Season 17
Matilda 'Wiebke' Schwartau	22	Germany	28th/27th	Season 17
Kristina Ber	20	Germany	26th/25th	Season 17
Lisa-Marie Cordt	22	Germany	26th/25th	Season 17
Lenara Klawitter	24	Germany	24th (quit)	Season 17
Kashmira Maduwege	20	Germany	23rd	Season 17
Laura Wende	19	Germany	22nd	Season 17
Barbara Radtke	68	Germany	21st/20th	Season 17
Jasmin Jägers	23	Germany	21st/20th	Season 17
Julia Weinhäupl	21	Germany	19th/18th	Season 17
Laura Bittner	20	Germany	19th/18th	Season 17
Jessica Adwubi	23	Germany	17th/16th	Season 17
Paulina Stępowska	32	Germany	17th/16th	Season 17
Annalotta Bönninger	20	Germany	15th	Season 17
Viola Schierenbeck	21	Ireland	14th/13th	Season 17
Inka Ferbert	19	Germany	14th/13th	Season 17
Amaya Baker	18	Germany	12th	Season 17
Vanessa Kunz	20	Germany	11th	Season 17
Sophie Dräger	18	Germany	10th/9th	Season 17
Juliana Stürmer	24	Germany	10th/9th	Season 17
Lena Krüger	20	Germany	8th	Season 17
Vivien Sterk	21	Germany	7th	Season 17
Lieselotte Reznicek	66	Germany	6th	Season 17
Anita Schaller	20	Germany	5th	Season 17
Noëlla Mbunga	24	Germany	4th	Season 17
Martina Gleissenebner-Teskey (Note: Lou-Anne Gleissenebner and Martina Gleissenebner-Teskey are mother and daughter; however, they competed individually.)	50	Austria	3rd	Season 17
Luca Lorenz	19	Germany	Runner Up	Season 17
Lou-Anne Gleissenebner	18	Austria	Winner	Season 17
Alina Enns	20	Germany	35th-32nd	Season 18
Elisaveta 'Elisabeth' Schmidt	21	Germany	35th-32nd	Season 18
Indira Mölle	20	Germany	35th-32nd	Season 18
Ana Feddersen	22	Germany	35th-32nd	Season 18
Slata Schneider	19	Germany	31st/30th	Season 18
Melissa Stöbke Carbonel	19	Germany	31st/30th	Season 18
Melina Rath	18	Austria	29th/28th	Season 18
Juliette Schulz	19	Germany	29th/28th	Season 18
Emilia Steitz	19	Germany	27th-25th	Season 18
Elizabeth 'Eliz' Steingraf	21	Germany	27th-25th	Season 18
Zoey Saflekou	26	Germany	27th-25th	Season 18
Sarah Benkhoff	20	Germany	24th (quit)	Season 18
Tracy Baumgarten	25	Germany	23rd (quit)	Season 18
Jenita 'Jülide' Beganovic	22	Germany	22nd	Season 18
Elsa Latifaj	18	Austria	21st	Season 18
Lara Rollhaus	19	Germany	20th	Season 18
Zuzel Palacio Calunga	50	Cuba	19th/18th	Season 18
Charlene Christian	51	Germany	19th/18th	Season 18
Leona Kastrati	19	Germany	17th	Season 18
Ina Aufenberg	44	Germany	16th	Season 18
Anya Elsner	19	Germany	15th	Season 18
Anna-Celina 'Cassy' Cassau	23	Germany	14th/13th	Season 18
Marielena Aponte	52	Germany	14th/13th	Season 18
Maike Nitsch	23	Germany	12th	Season 18
Nina Kablitz	22	Germany	11th	Season 18
Mirella Janev	20	Germany	10th	Season 18
Katherine Markov	20	Germany	9th	Season 18
Frideriki 'Ida' Kulis	23	Germany	8th/7th	Season 18
Anna-Maria Fuhrmann	24	Germany	8th/7th	Season 18
Coco Clever	20	Germany	6th	Season 18
Nicole Reitbauer	49	Germany	5th	Season 18
Selma Schröder	18	Germany	4th	Season 18
Olivia Hounkpati	22	Germany	3rd	Season 18
Somajia Ali	21	Germany	Runner Up	Season 18
Vivien Blotzki	22	Germany	Winner	Season 18
Vivien Walkemeyer	24	Germany	40th (quit)	Season 19
Pit-Jendrik 'Pitzi' Müller	33	Germany	39th (DQ)	Season 19
Yanik Schulze	20	Germany	38th-35th	Season 19
Vanessa Horst	22	Germany	38th-35th	Season 19
Tracy Baumgarten (Note: Tracy Baumgarten previously competed in the eighteenth season of the series, where she placed twenty-third.)	26	Germany	38th-35th	Season 19
Bảo Huy Nguyễn	22	Germany	38th-35th	Season 19
Felice Wolfgram	20	Germany	34th-32nd	Season 19
Lilian Assih	24	Germany	34th-32nd	Season 19
Marcia Edhere	23	Switzerland	34th-32nd	Season 19
Livingsten Amalanathan	23	Germany	31st-29th	Season 19
Leoni Mecklenburg	25	Germany	31st-29th	Season 19
Franz Vochezer	19	Germany	31st-29th	Season 19
Max Uhrmacher	20	Germany	28th/27th	Season 19
Alexandra Bode	21	Germany	28th/27th	Season 19
Yusupha Jobarteh	25	Germany	26th-23rd	Season 19
Nuri Enoch	21	Germany	26th-23rd	Season 19
Jana Wetzel	24	Germany	26th-23rd	Season 19
Felix Schneider	20	Germany	26th-23rd	Season 19
Lilli Hachgenei	22	Germany	22nd/21st	Season 19
Dominik Gruber	27	Germany	22nd/21st	Season 19
Maximilian Kreiner	21	Austria	20th/19th	Season 19
Mare Cirko	22	Germany	20th/19th	Season 19
Lydwine Nitidem	21	Germany	18th/17th	Season 19
Lucas Schwarze	24	Germany	18th/17th	Season 19
Stella Sellere	34	Germany	16th/15th	Season 19
Dominic Spillner	20	Germany	16th/15th	Season 19
Aldin Zahirovic (Note: Aldin Zahirovic previously competed in the third season of Switzerland's Next Topmodel, where he placed third.)	22	Germany	14th/13th	Season 19
Sara Zuraw	28	Germany	14th/13th	Season 19
Marvin De-Graft	22	Germany	12th	Season 19
Kadidja Becher	21	Austria	11th	Season 19
Armin Rausch	27	Germany	10th	Season 19
Grees 'Grace' Zakhour	24	Germany	9th/8th	Season 19
Frieder Sell	25	Germany	9th/8th	Season 19
Fabienne Urbach	20	Germany	7th-5th	Season 19
Tarkan 'Julian' Cidic (Note: Julian and Luka Cidic are identical twins; however, they competed individually until the 16th episode of Season 19, where Heidi announced they will now compete as a team.)	24	Germany	7th-5th	Season 19
Luka Cidic	24	Germany	7th-5th	Season 19
Ksenia 'Xenia' Tsilikova	23	Germany	Runners-up	Season 19
Linus Weber	25	Germany	Runners-up	Season 19
Lea Oude Engberink	24	Germany	Winners	Season 19
Jermaine Kokoú Kothe	19	Germany	Winners	Season 19
Angelina Matic	20	Germany	51st-47th	Season 20
Marlene Erdmann Sánchez	22	Germany	51st-47th	Season 20
Leila Charifa Kraus	22	Germany	51st-47th	Season 20
Marie Schöner	21	Germany	51st-47th	Season 20
Jessica Lüdi	22	Switzerland	51st-47th	Season 20
Konstantin Bell	24	Germany	46th-44th	Season 20
Enis Spahija	23	Germany	46th-44th	Season 20
Julian Johannes 'J.J.' Stocks	34	Germany	46th-44th	Season 20
Natali Czesak	25	Germany	43rd-40th	Season 20
Lucia Doric	21	Germany	43rd-40th	Season 20
Valeria Hoffmann	21	Germany	43rd-40th	Season 20
Stella Miljenovic	23	Germany	43rd-40th	Season 20
Felix Flad	27	Germany	39th-37th	Season 20
Gabriel Moreno von Schinckel	23	Switzerland	39th-37th	Season 20
Christian Preineg	23	Austria	39th-37th	Season 20
Jule-Malin 'Jule' Gscheidle	21	Germany	36th	Season 20
Jonathan Tolno (Note: Jonathan and Josy Tolno are brother and sister; however, they competed individually.)	25	Germany	35th-33rd	Season 20
Felix Schiller (Note: Felix Schiller previously competed in the seventh season of Austria's Next Topmodel, where he placed nineteenth.)	30	Austria	35th-33rd	Season 20
Ryan Wöhrl	22	Germany	35th-33rd	Season 20
Safia Asare	24	Germany	32nd (quit)	Season 20
Laura Klingert	25	Germany	31st	Season 20
Tim Schröder	19	Germany	30th-28th	Season 20
Matthias 'Mattes' Hafermann	38	Germany	30th-28th	Season 20
Lian Hansen	21	Austria	30th-28th	Season 20
Alexander Van Hove	24	Germany	27th/26th	Season 20
Luisa 'Lulu' Gömann (Note: Katrin Gömann-Elsner and Lulu Gömann are mother and daughter; however, they competed individually.)	32	Germany	27th/26th	Season 20
Katrin Gömann-Elsner	56	Germany	25th (quit)	Season 20
Annett Bremer	46	Germany	24th/23rd	Season 20
Keanu Bohatsch	24	Germany	24th/23rd	Season 20
Ethan Moore	19	Germany	22nd	Season 20
Faruk Aytaç Keçe	21	Germany	21st-19th	Season 20
Felix Lintner	21	Austria	21st-19th	Season 20
Svenja Sievers	24	Germany	21st-19th	Season 20
Lisa Brandstätter	19	Austria	18th	Season 20
Samuel Dohmen	23	Germany	17th	Season 20
Xenia Redelmann	26	Germany	16th/15th	Season 20
Nawin Nazary	27	Germany	16th/15th	Season 20
Eva Bloss	26	Germany	14th/13th	Season 20
Katharina Van de Sandt	24	Austria	14th/13th	Season 20
Ray Ewulu	30	Germany	12th	Season 20
Josephine 'Josy' Tolno	19	Germany	11th	Season 20
Aaliyah Isla	22	Germany	10th/9th	Season 20
Kevin Vukelja	24	Germany	10th/9th	Season 20
Canel Delice	26	Germany	8th/7th	Season 20
Eliob Demofike	23	Japan	8th/7th	Season 20
Zoe Rötzel	19	Germany	6th/5th	Season 20
Jannik Richter	22	Germany	6th/5th	Season 20
Pierre Lang	22	Austria	Runners-up	Season 20
Magdalena Milic	21	Austria	Runners-up	Season 20
Moritz Rüdiger	18	Germany	Winners	Season 20
Daniela Djokić	20	Germany	Winners	Season 20
Christian Damke	24	Germany	54th-51st	Season 21
Jonas Welker	24	Germany	54th-51st	Season 21
Oskar Elia	20	Germany	54th-51st	Season 21
Gerhard Versen	57	Germany	54th-51st	Season 21
Chioma 'Juliet' (Note: Janet and Juliet are identical twins; however, they competed individually.)	24	Germany	50th-46th	Season 21
Chinyere 'Janet'	24	Germany	50th-46th	Season 21
Angela 'Angie' Riefler	26	Germany	50th-46th	Season 21
Sophie Shostak	18	Germany	50th-46th	Season 21
Sina Metschberger	23	Germany	50th-46th	Season 21
Hyan Silva	30	Germany	45th-43rd	Season 21
Tari Hetzel	26	Germany	45th-43rd	Season 21
Martin Hoffer	36	Germany	45th-43rd	Season 21
Ursula Gigliotti	54	Switzerland	42nd-40th	Season 21
Cléo de Gracia	19	Germany	42nd-40th	Season 21
Vanessa Mezler	19	Germany	42nd-40th	Season 21
Matthias Hanauska	26	Germany	39th (quit)	Season 21
Denzel Lonkeu Yankam	26	Germany	38th/37th	Season 21
Vyvian Nellira	33	Germany	38th/37th	Season 21
Dilara Beyersdorf	23	Germany	36th-34th	Season 21
Marie Voss	23	Germany	36th-34th	Season 21
Stella Hendrick-Schiller	21	Germany	36th-34th	Season 21
Cenk Cihan	24	Austria	33rd-31st	Season 21
Adrian Kadrijaj	21	Germany	33rd-31st	Season 21
Benjamin McCornell	20	Germany	33rd-31st	Season 21
Kim Bathke	24	Germany	30th-28th	Season 21
Alisa Nowak	27	Germany	30th-28th	Season 21
Lola Stoll	19	Germany	30th-28th	Season 21
Eileen Kaupp	19	Germany	27th/26th	Season 21
Felix Wilkens	27	Germany	27th/26th	Season 21
Lukas Bienn	21	Germany	25th/24th	Season 21
Jill Deimel	44	Germany	25th/24th	Season 21
Juna Kleespies	23	Germany	23rd-21st	Season 21
Lara Lemke	19	Germany	23rd-21st	Season 21
Jayden Lack	22	Germany	23rd-21st	Season 21
Bianca Sissing	47	Switzerland	20th	Season 21
Carsten Montanha	49	Germany	19th	Season 21
Safia Asare (Note: Safia Asare previously competed in the twentieth season of the series, where she placed twenty-ninth.)	25	Germany	18th (quit)	Season 21
Merret Fuxius	20	Germany	17th	Season 21
Nana B.	24	Germany	16th	Season 21
Boureima R.	21	Germany	15th	Season 21
Yanneck Wiese	24	Germany	14th/13th	Season 21
Antonia Warr	19	Germany	14th/13th	Season 21
Louis Wielki	23	Germany	12th/11th	Season 21
Julia de Boer	25	Germany	12th/11th	Season 21
Marlene Krüger	20	Germany	10th	Season 21
Alexander 'Alexavius' Hill	22	Austria	9th	Season 21
Anika Köpfer	27	Germany	8th/7th	Season 21
Luis Flügel	23	Germany	8th/7th	Season 21
Tony Eberhardt	31	Germany	6th/5th	Season 21
Daphne Arias Minda	25	Germany	6th/5th	Season 21
Anna Furtner	22	Germany	Runners-up	Season 21
Godfrey Egbon	34	Austria	Runners-up	Season 21
Aurélie Siewitz	21	Germany	Winners	Season 21
Ibrahim 'Ibo' Ouro Bodi	21	Germany	Winners	Season 21

=== Statistics ===
- Quitters: 46 - Céline Roscheck (Cycle 1), Sophie Dahl (Cycle 2), Alina Maier (Cycle 2), Vanessa Hegelmaier (Cycle 3), Aline Kautz (Cycle 5), Valerie Blum (Cycle 6), Joana Damek (Cycle 6), Diana Ovchinnikova (Cycle 7), Evelyn Keck (Cycle 7), Clara Zaveta (Cycle 8), Merle Lambert (Cycle 8), Höpke Voß (Cycle 8), Bingyang Liu (Cycle 8), Sophie Jais (Cycle 8), Pauline Cottin (Cycle 9), Laura Haas (Cycle 9), Ina Bartak (Cycle 9), Fata Hasanovic (Cycle 9), Anna Wilken (Cycle 9), Sarah Kocar (Cycle 10), Annabel Paasch (Cycle 10), Luisa Bolghiran (Cycle 11), Laura Penelope Baumgärtner (Cycle 11), Julia Wulf (Cycle 11), Helena Fritz (Cycle 12), Greta Faeser (Cycle 12), Ivana Rajić-Hrnjić (Cycle 13), Olivia Rhode (Cycle 14), Kim Dammer (Cycle 14), Enisa Bukvic (Cycle 14), Vanessa Stanat (Cycle 14), Mareike Lerch (Cycle 15), Lijana Kaggwa (Cycle 15), Ricarda Häschke (Cycle 16), Sara Ullmann (Cycle 16), Mira Folster (Cycle 16), Jasmine Jüttner (Cycle 16), Romy Wolf (Cycle 16), Ashley Amegan (Cycle 16), Lenara Klawitter (Cycle 17), Sarah Benkhoff (Cycle 18), Tracy Baumgarten (Cycle 18), Vivien Walkemeyer (Cycle 19), Safia Asare (Cycles 20 and 21), Katrin Gömann-Elsner (Cycle 20), & Matthias Hanauska (Cycle 21)
- Disqualifications: 2 - Jasmin Cadete Rosado (Cycle 14) and Pitzi Müller (Cycle 19)
- Models eliminated outside of judging panel: 32 - Concetta Mazza (Cycle 6), Christien Fleischhauer (Cycle 6), Simone Rohrmüller (Cycle 6), Florence Lodevic (Cycle 6), Laura Scharnagl (Cycle 7), Katharina Oltzow (Cycle 8), Lisa-Giulia Wende (Season 8), Christina Wiessner (Cycle 12), Saskia Mächler (Cycle 12), Claudia Fiedler (Cycle 12), Aissatou Niang (Cycle 12), Anh Phuong Dinh Phan (Cycle 12), Selma Toroy (Cycle 13), Liane Polt (Cycle 13), Karoline Seul (Cycle 13), Gerda Lewis (Cycle 13), Shari Streich (Cycle 13), Klaudia Giez (Cycle 13), Sara Leutenegger (Cycle 13), Sarah Almoril (Cycle 14), Cassandra Feliciano (Cycle 15), Marie Rathay (Cycle 15), Tamara Hitz (Cycle 15), Linda Braunberger (Cycle 16), Melissa Stoebke-Carbonel (Cycle 18), Slata Schneider (Cycle 18), Jülide Beganovic (Cycle 18), Charlene Christian (Cycle 18), Zuzel Palacio Calunga (Cycle 18), Alexander Van Hove (Cycle 20), Lulu Gömann (Cycle 20) & Ray Ewulu (Cycle 20)

== Gallery ==
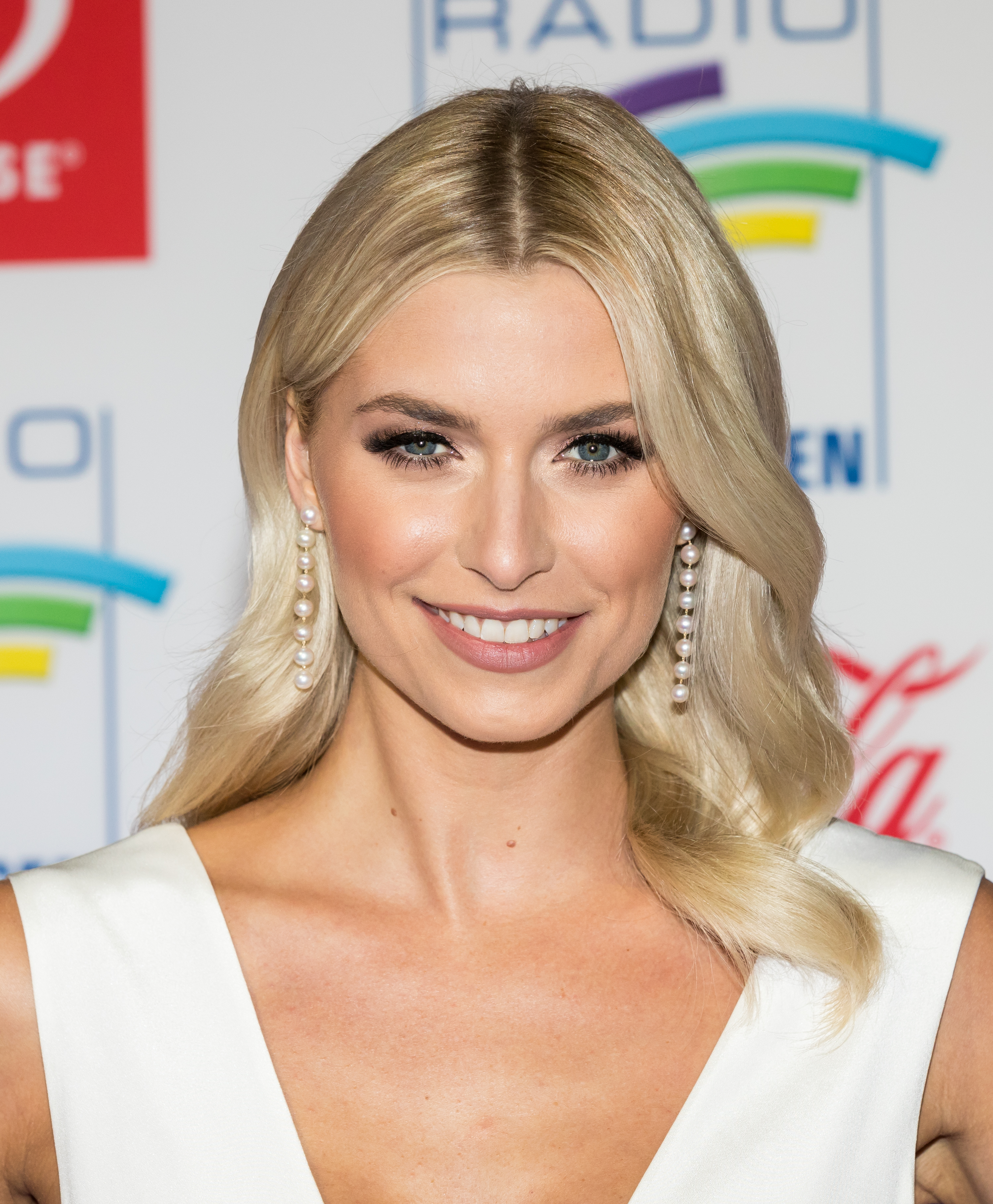
Lena Gercke,
winner of GNTM, season 1

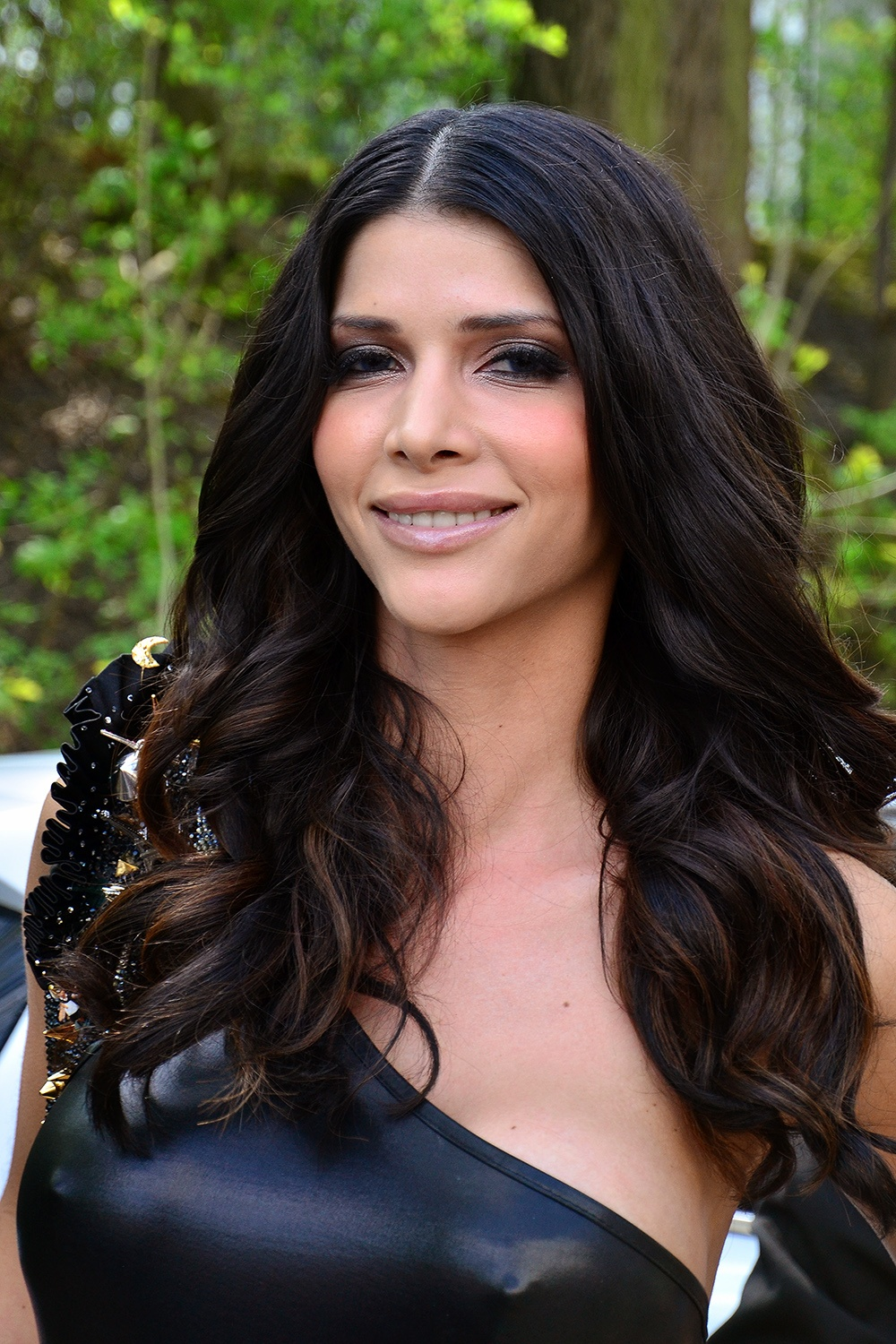
Micaela Schäfer,
GNTM, season 1

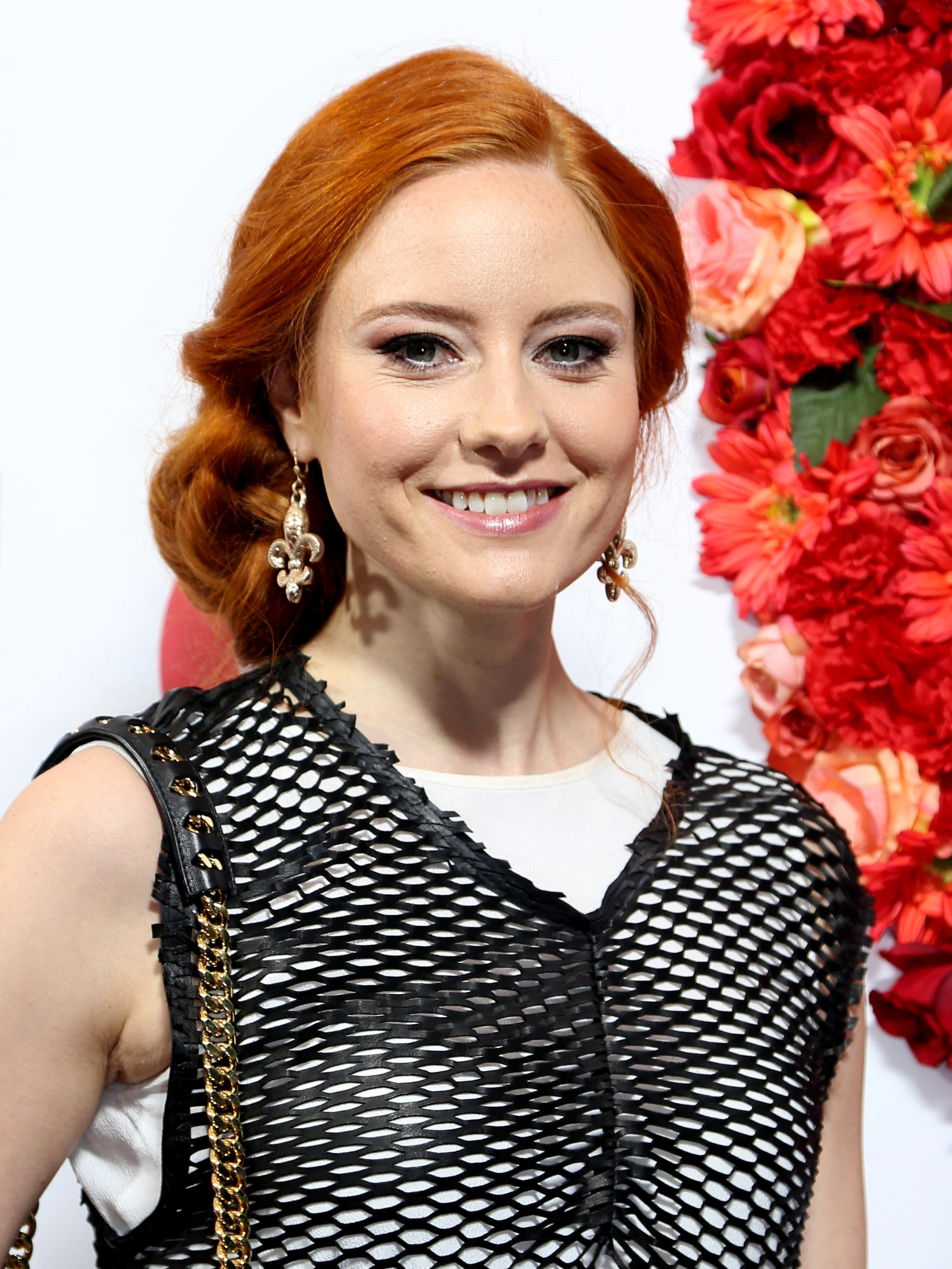
Barbara Meier,
winner of GNTM, season 2

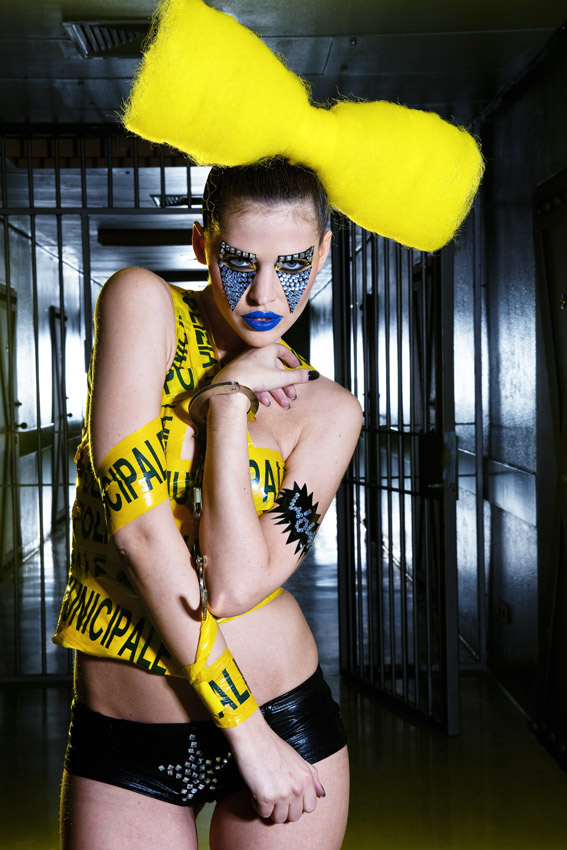
Hana Nitsche,
GNTM, season 2

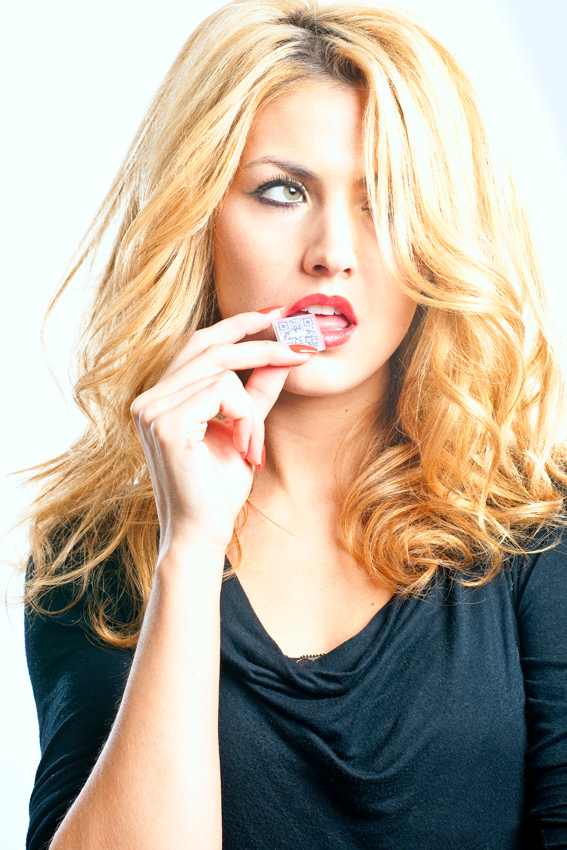
Fiona Erdmann,
GNTM, season 2

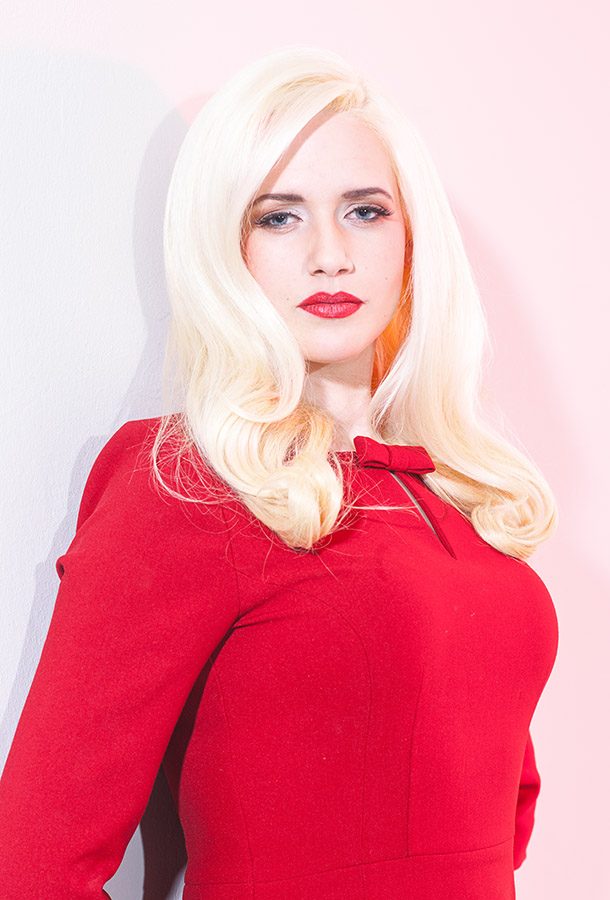
Sarah Knappik,
GNTM, season 3

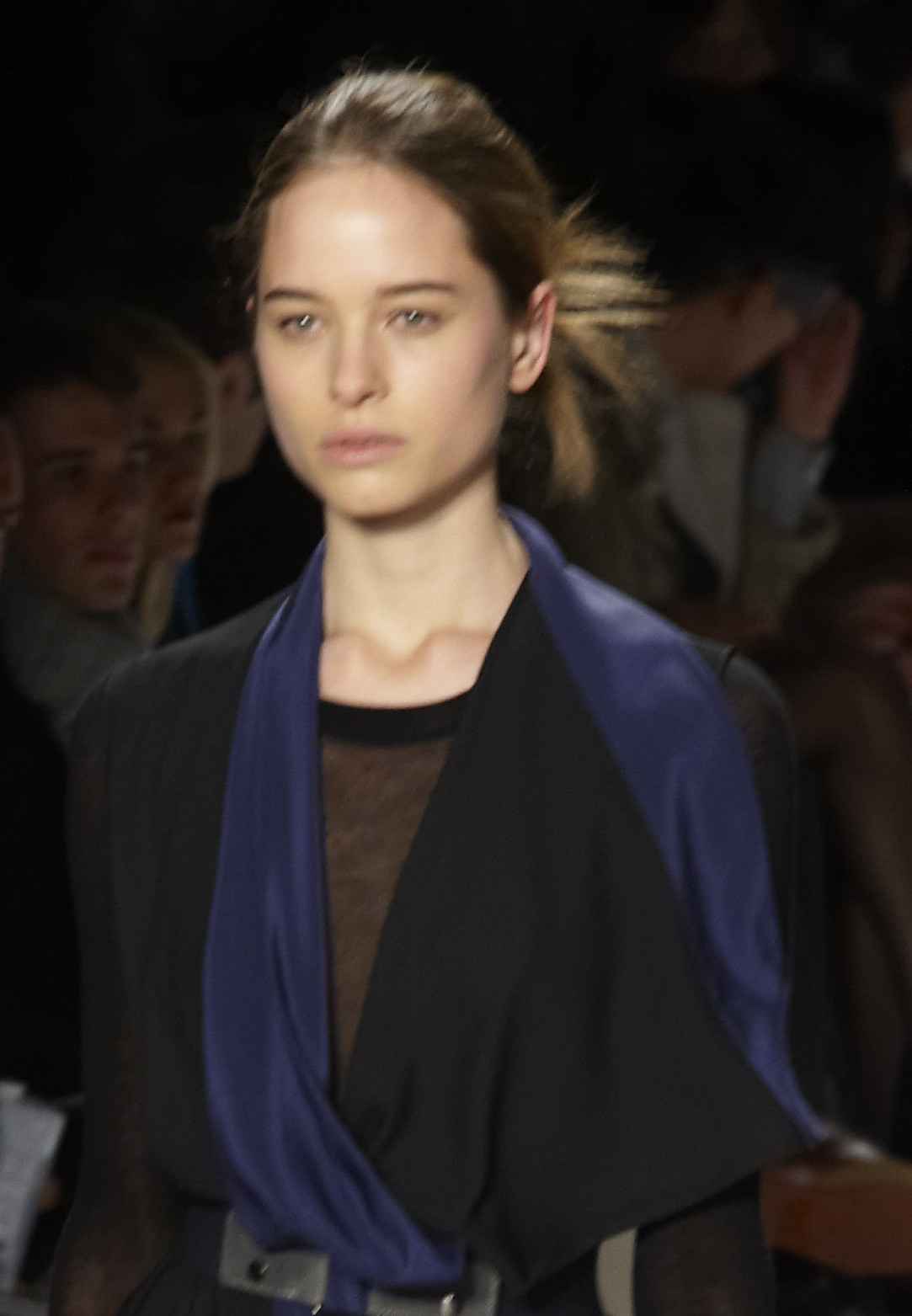
Vanessa Hegelmaier,
GNTM, season 3

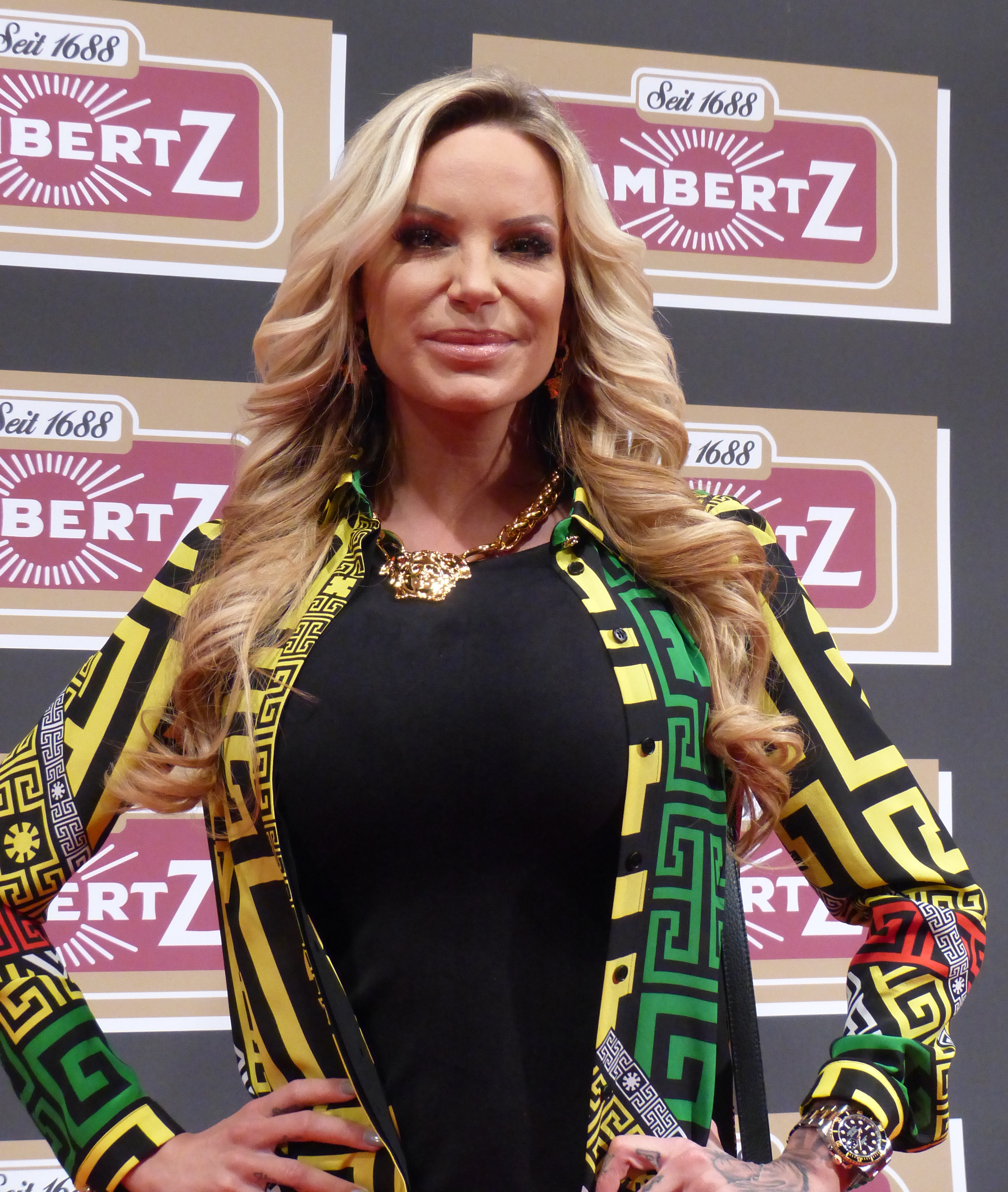
Gina-Lisa Lohfink,
GNTM, season 3

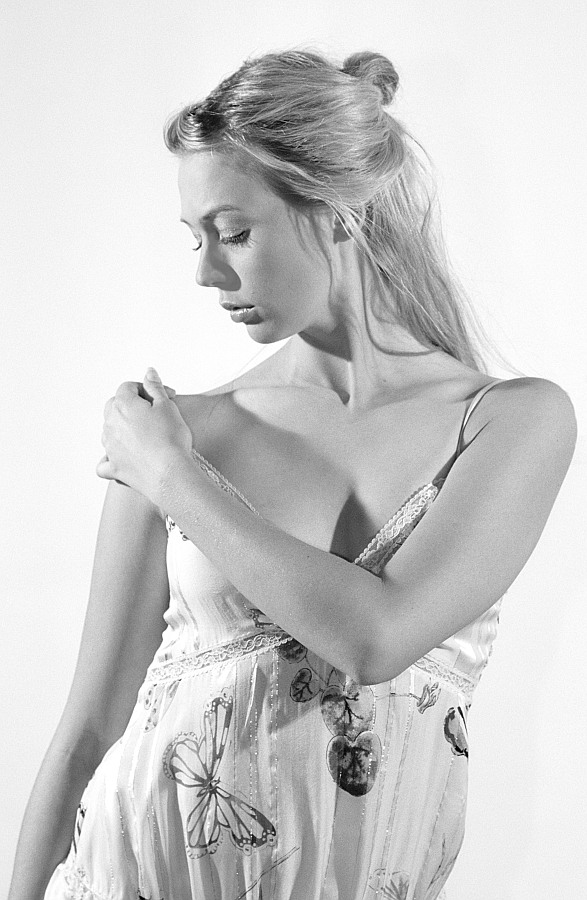
Aline Tausch,
GNTM, season 3

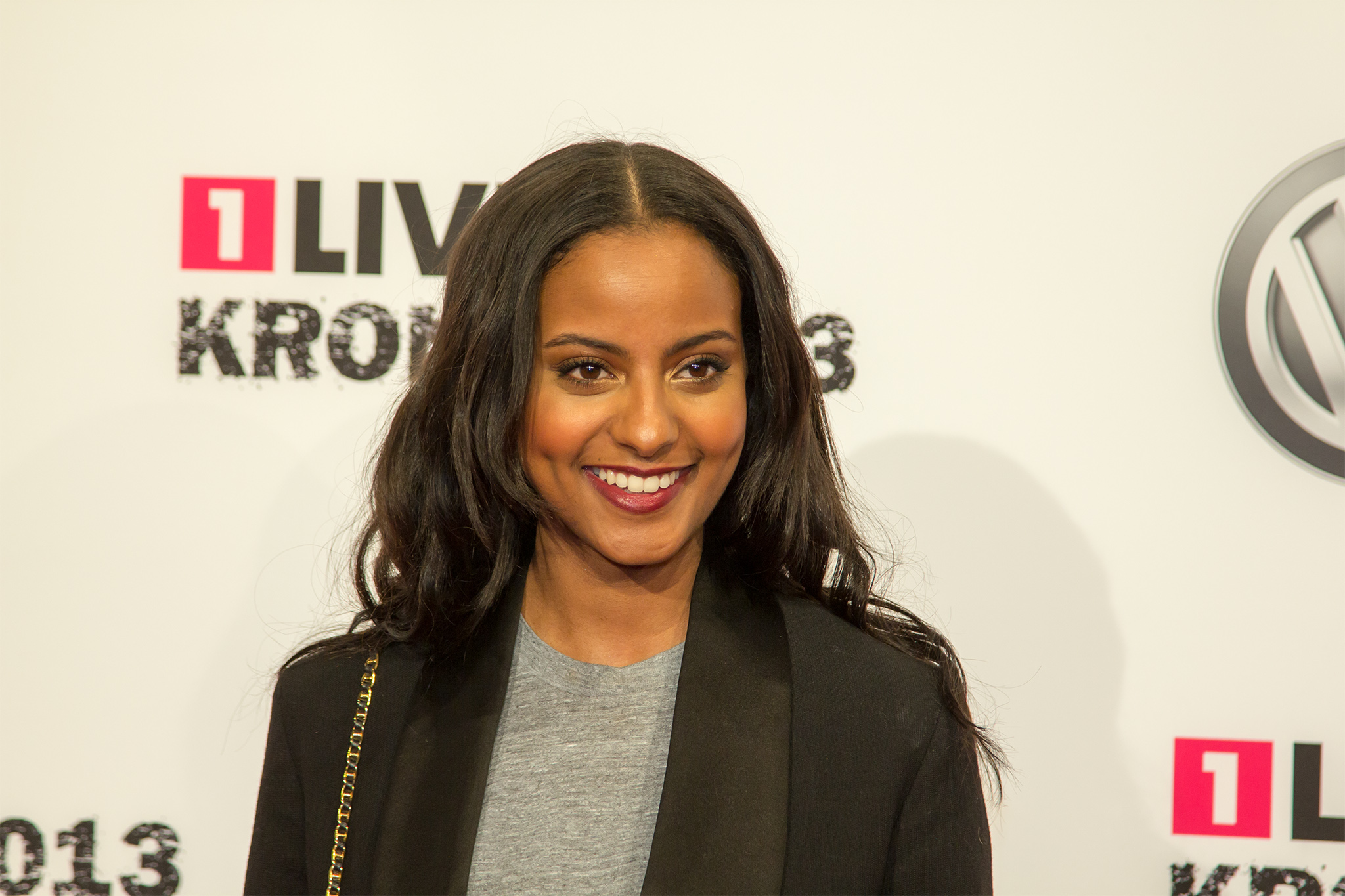
Sara Nuru,
winner of GNTM, season 4

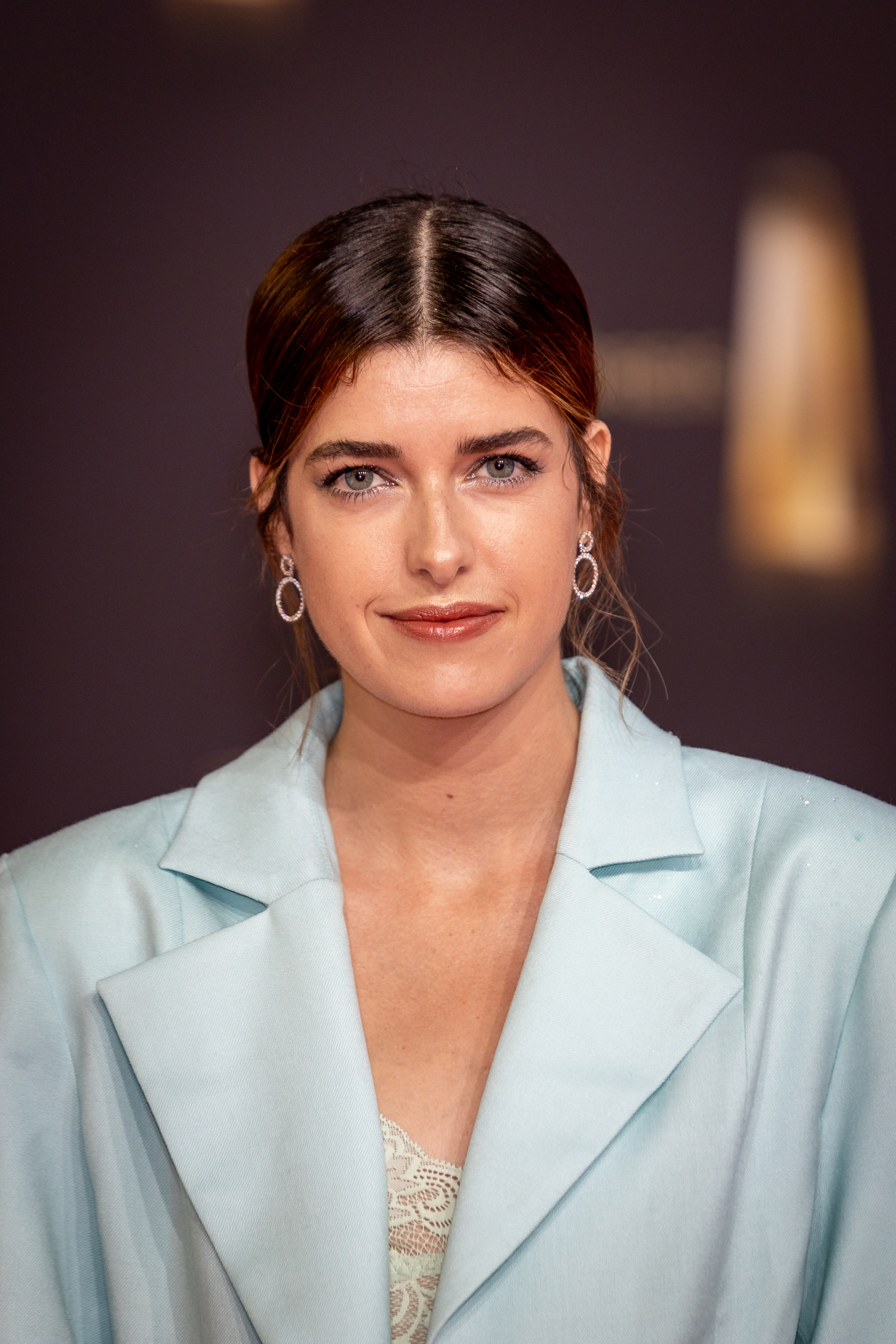
Marie Nasemann,
GNTM, season 4

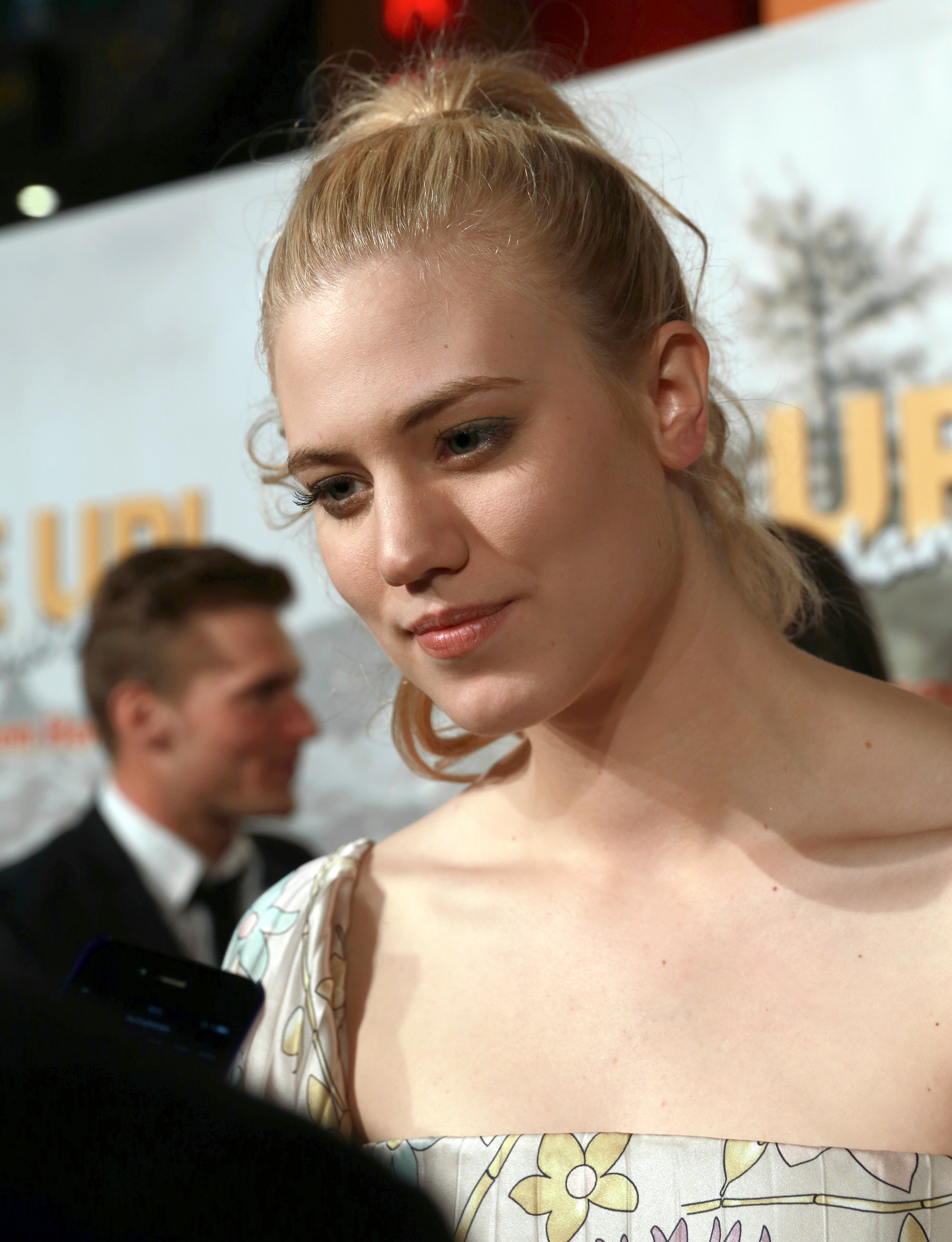
Larissa Marolt,
GNTM, season 4

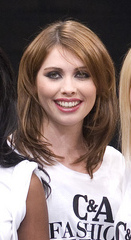
Ira Meindl,
GNTM, season 4

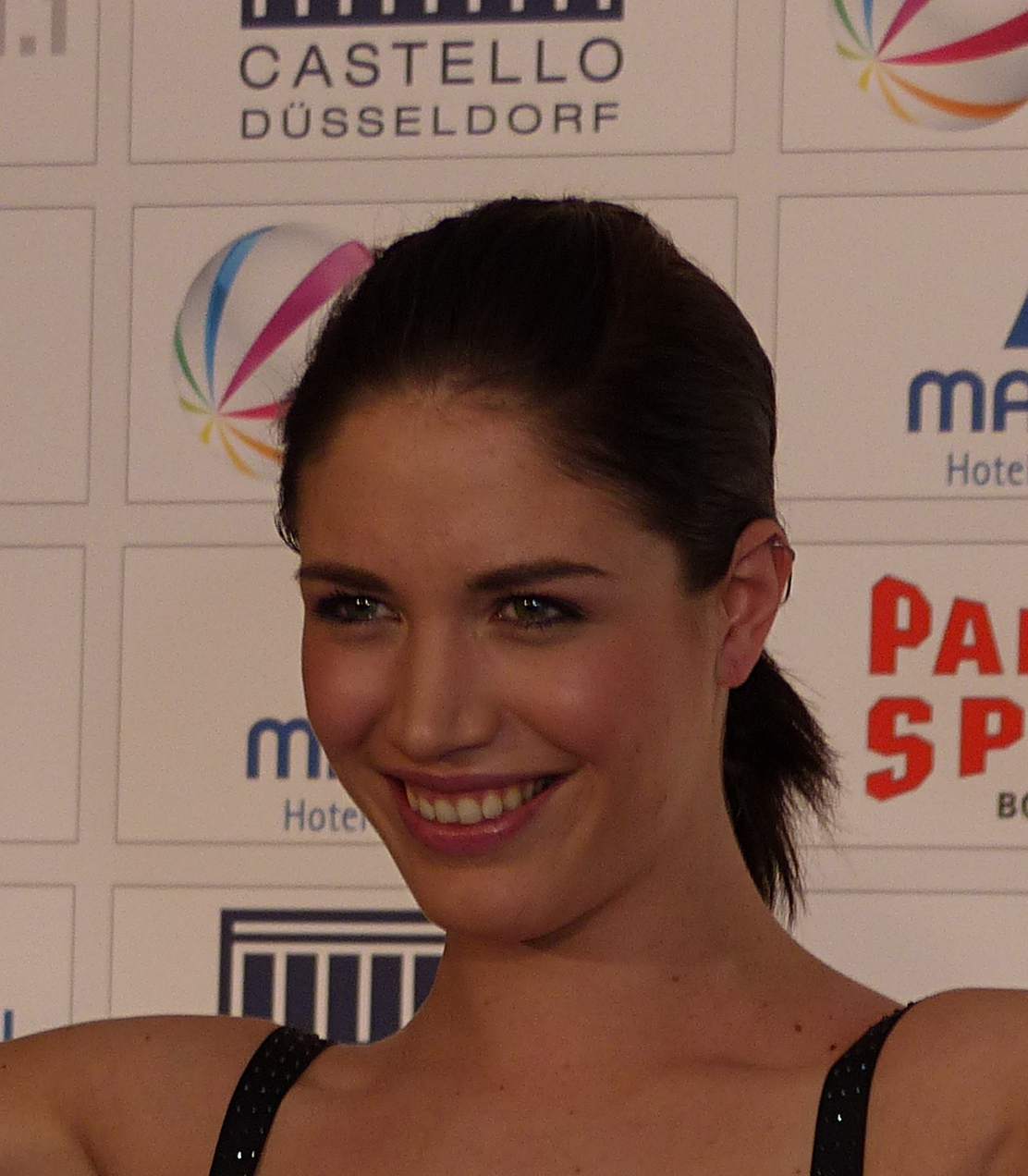
Tessa Bergmeier,
GNTM, season 4

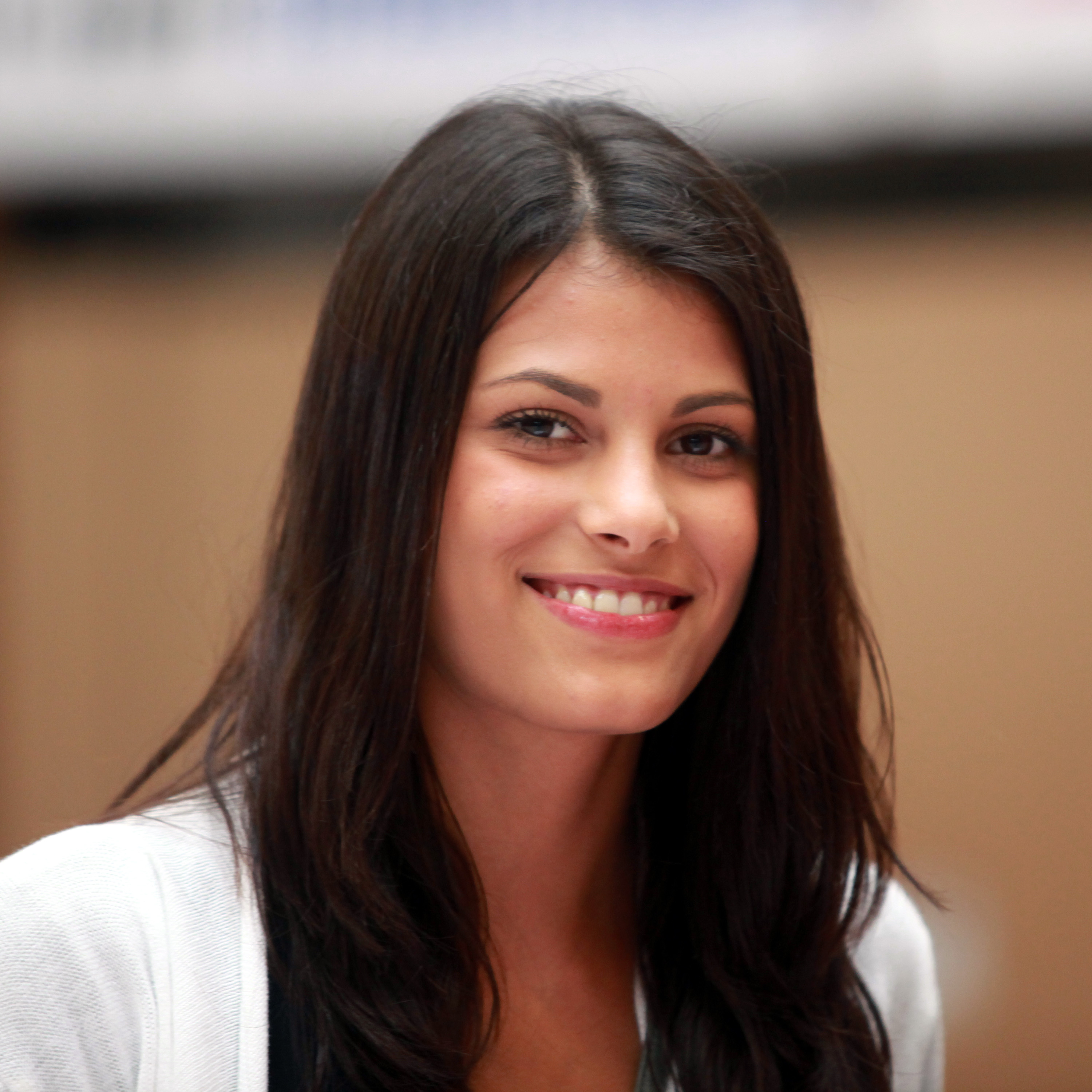
Alisar Ailabouni,
winner of GNTM, season 5

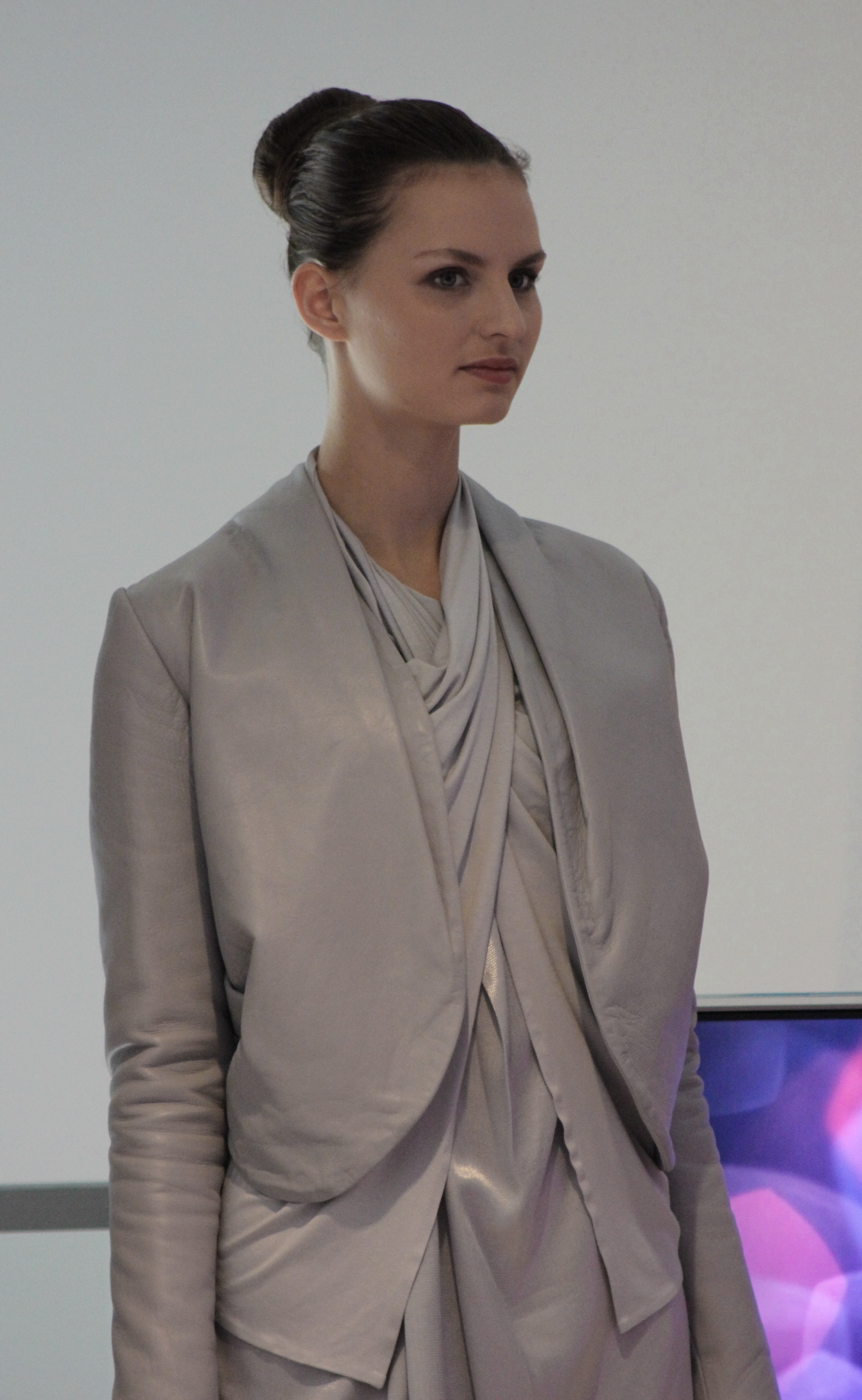
Neele Hehemann,
GNTM, season 5

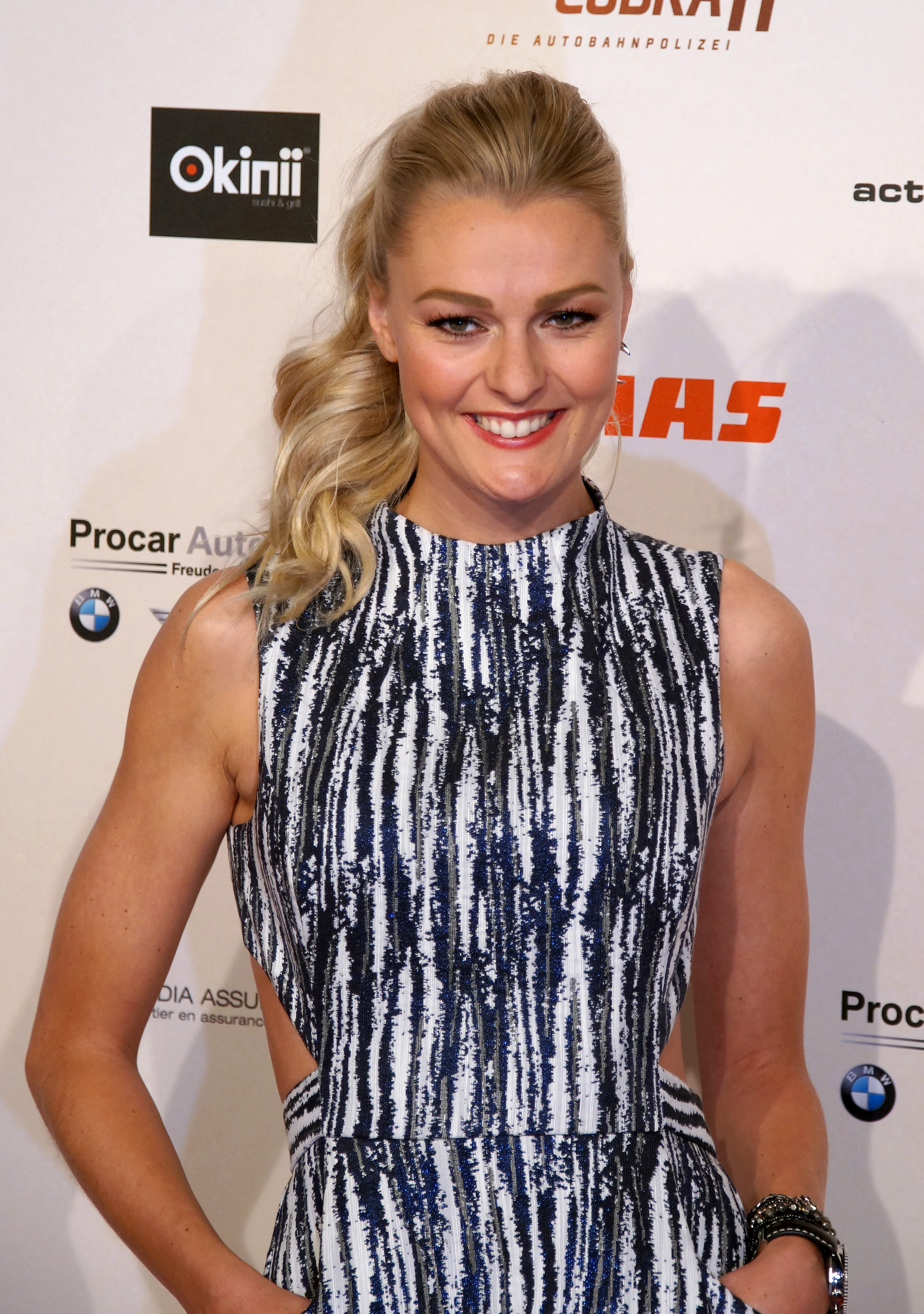
Miriam Höller,
GNTM, season 5

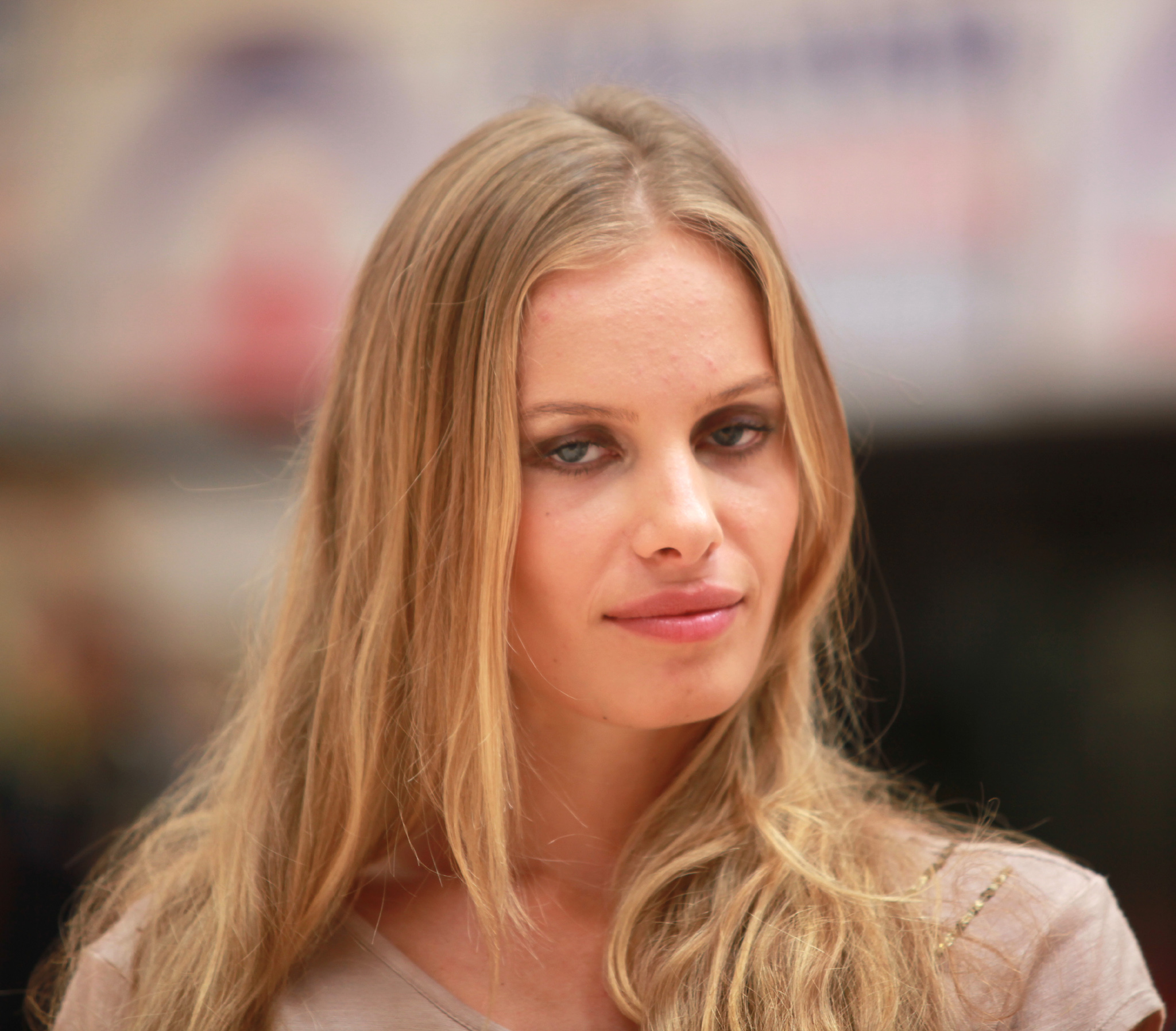
Jana Beller,
winner of GNTM, season 6

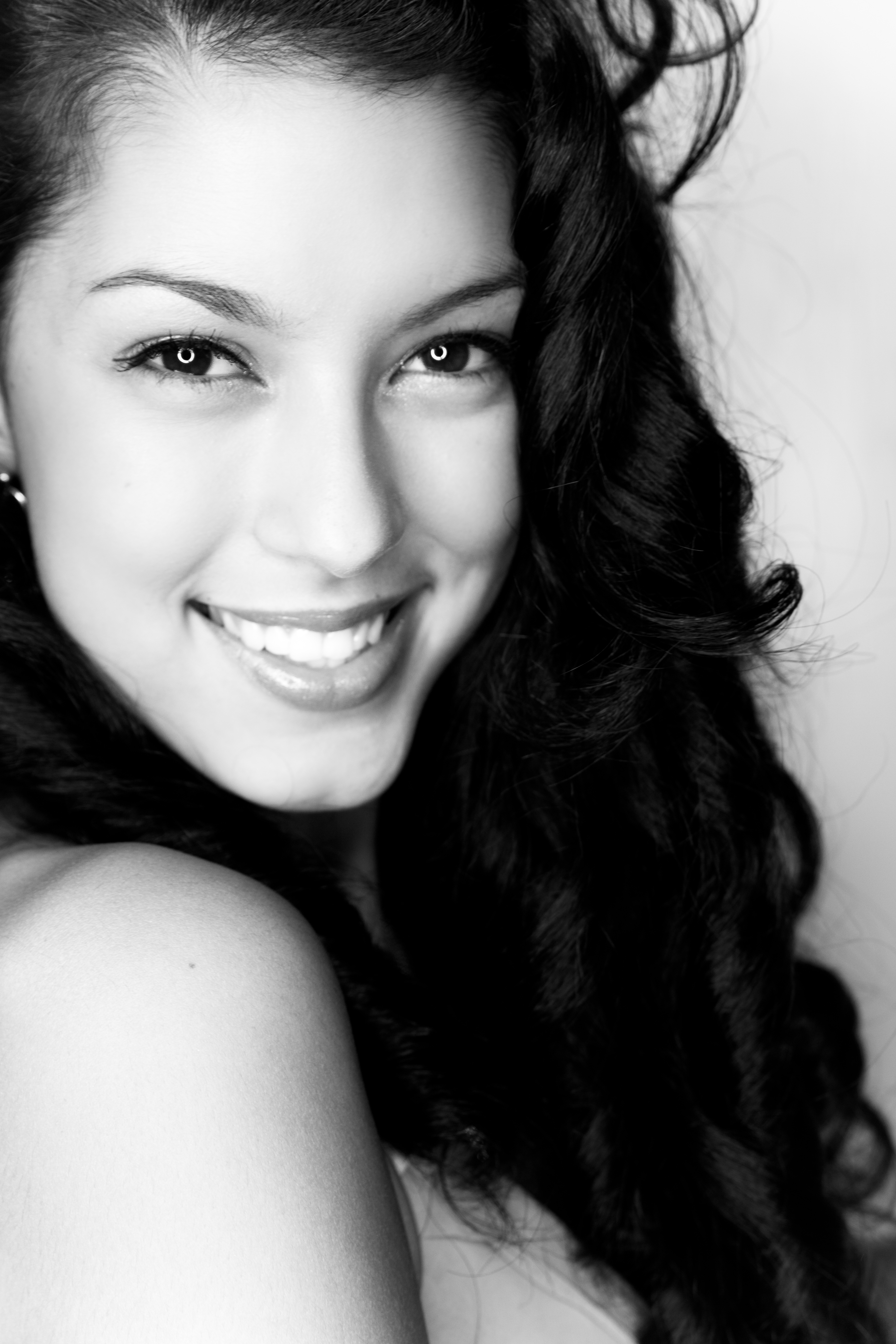
Rebecca Mir,
runner-up of GNTM, season 6

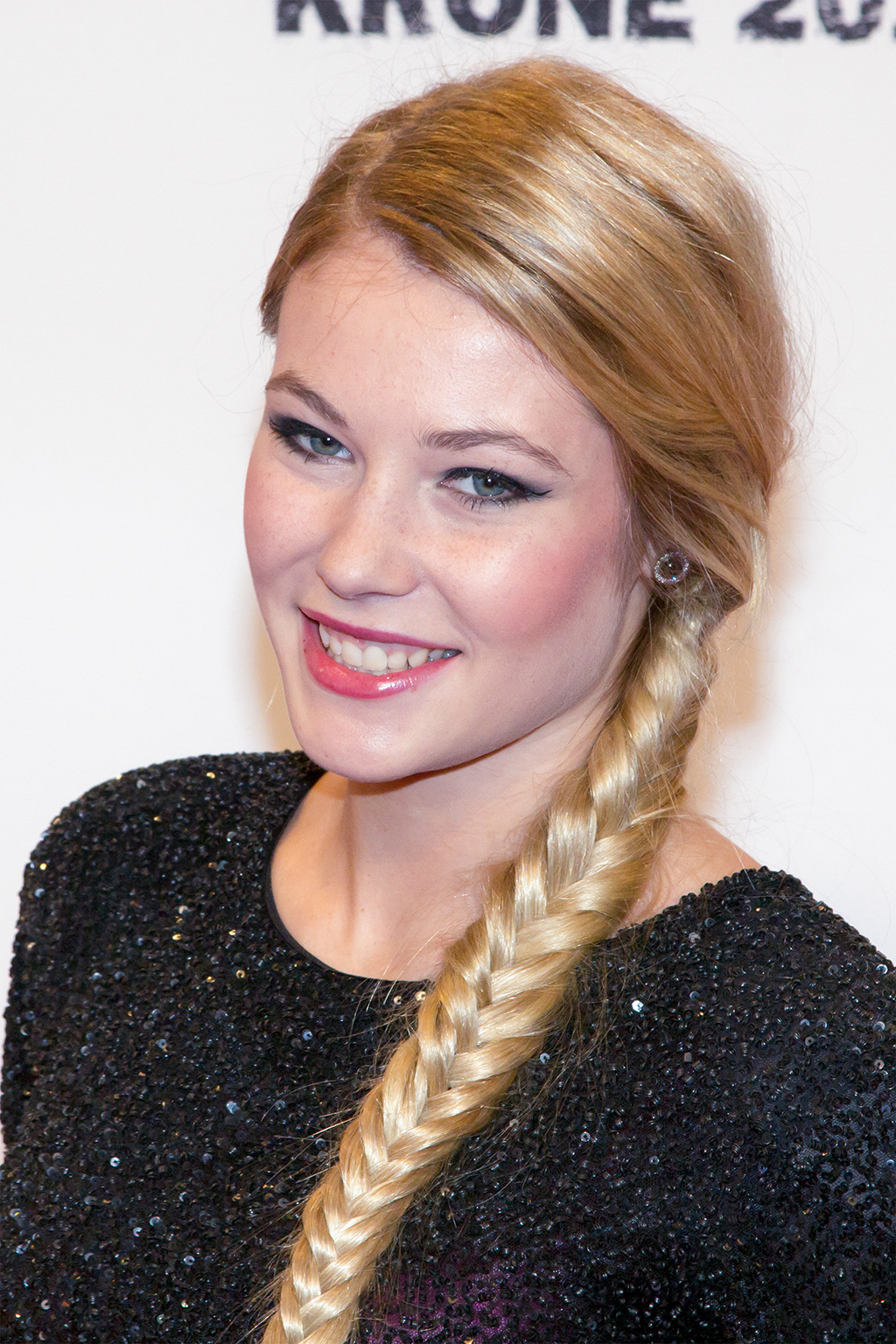
Amelie Klever,
GNTM, season 6

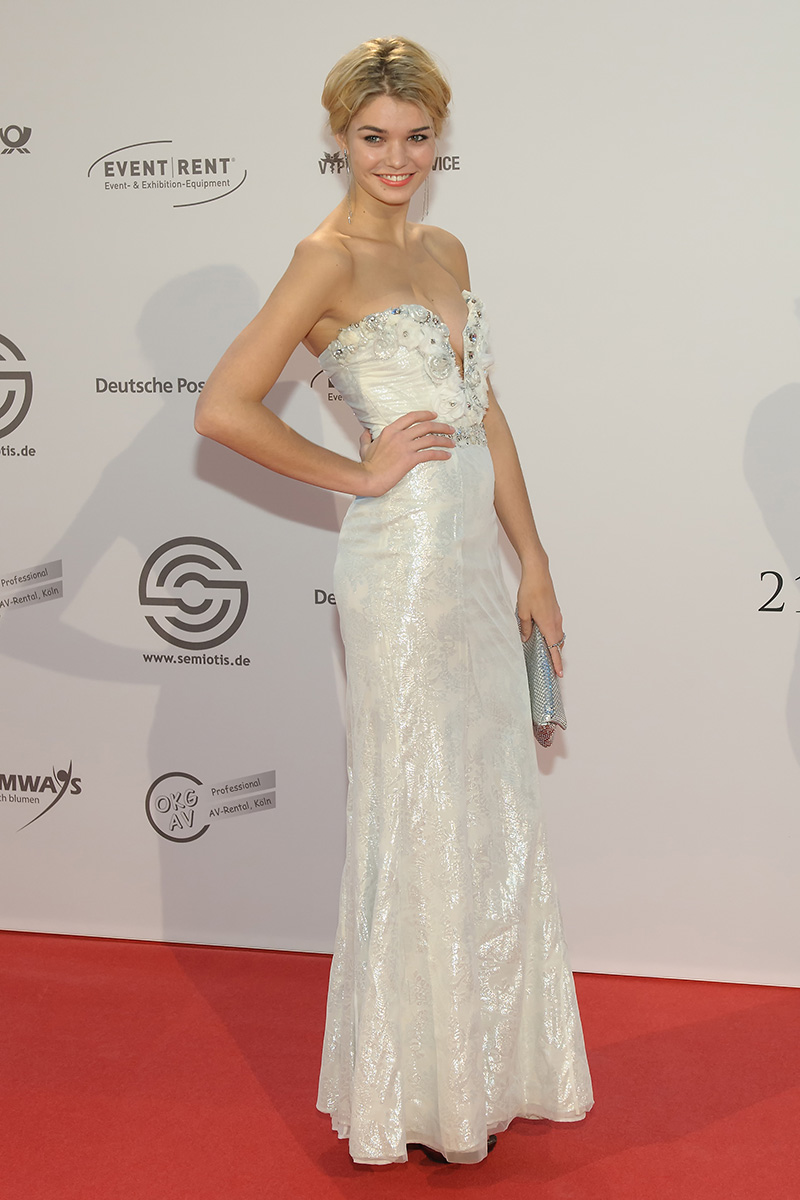
Luisa Hartema,
winner of GNTM, season 7

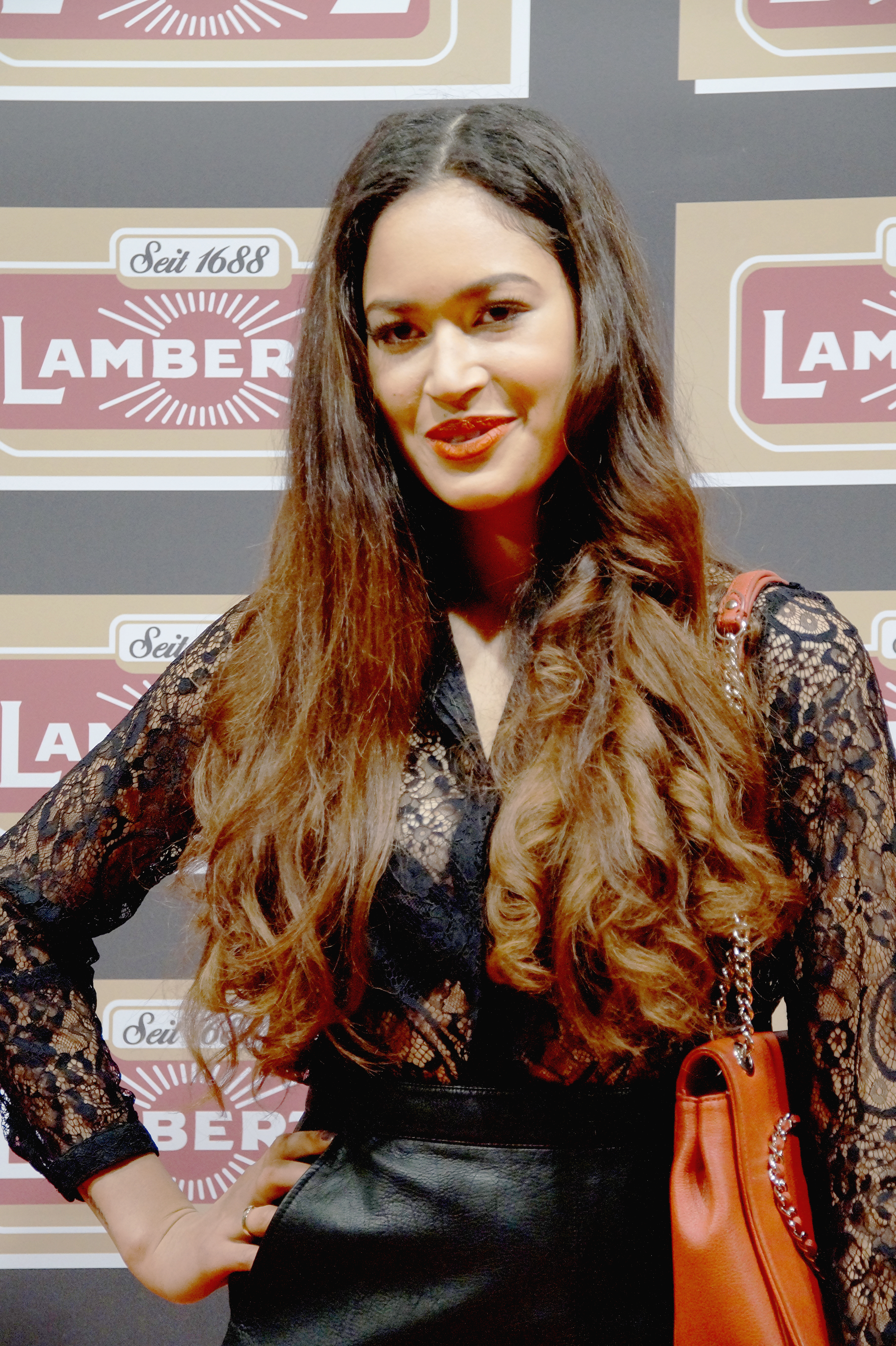
Lovelyn Enebechi,
winner of GNTM, season 8

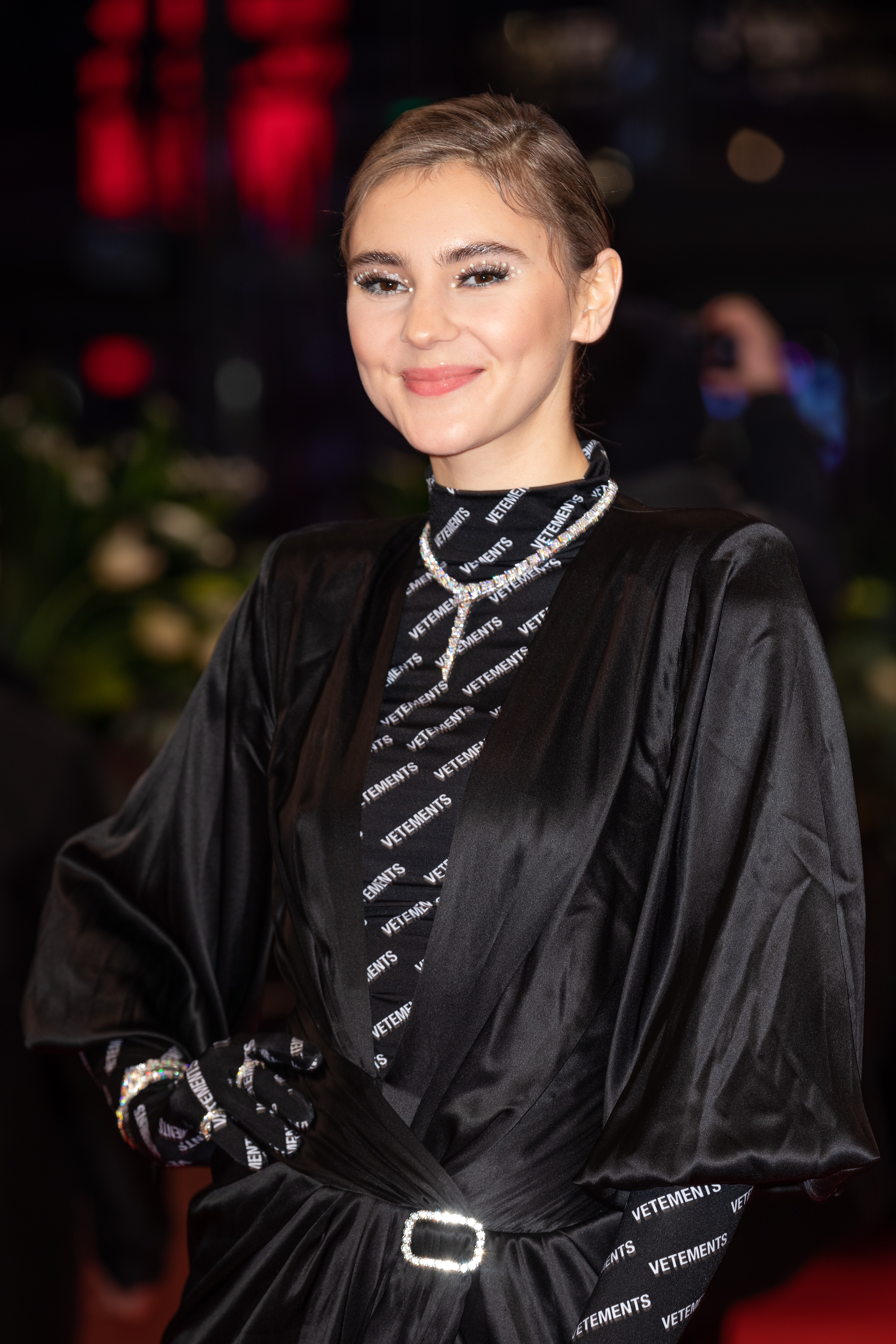
Stefanie Giesinger,
winner of GNTM, season 9

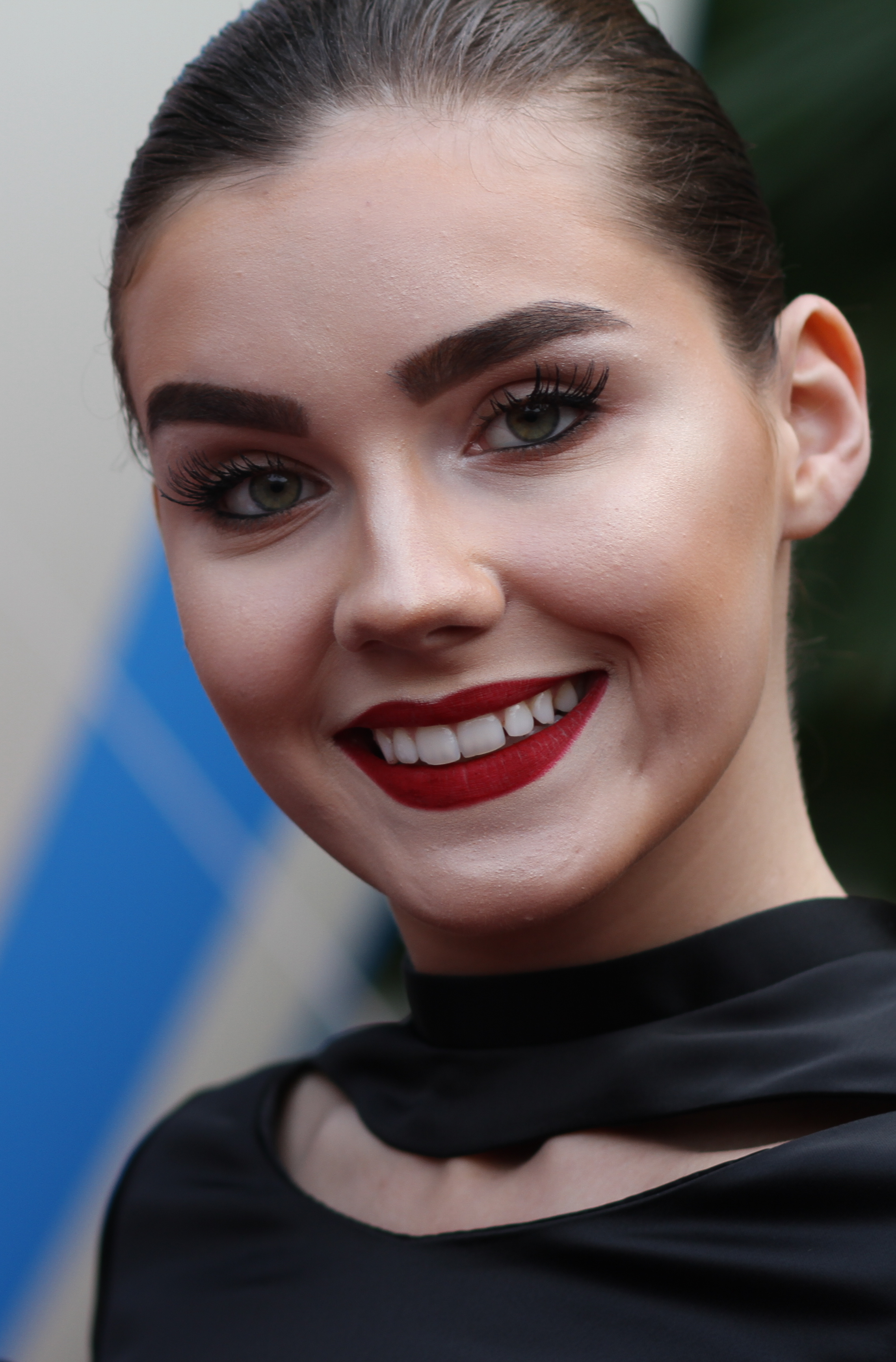
Nathalie Volk,
GNTM, season 9

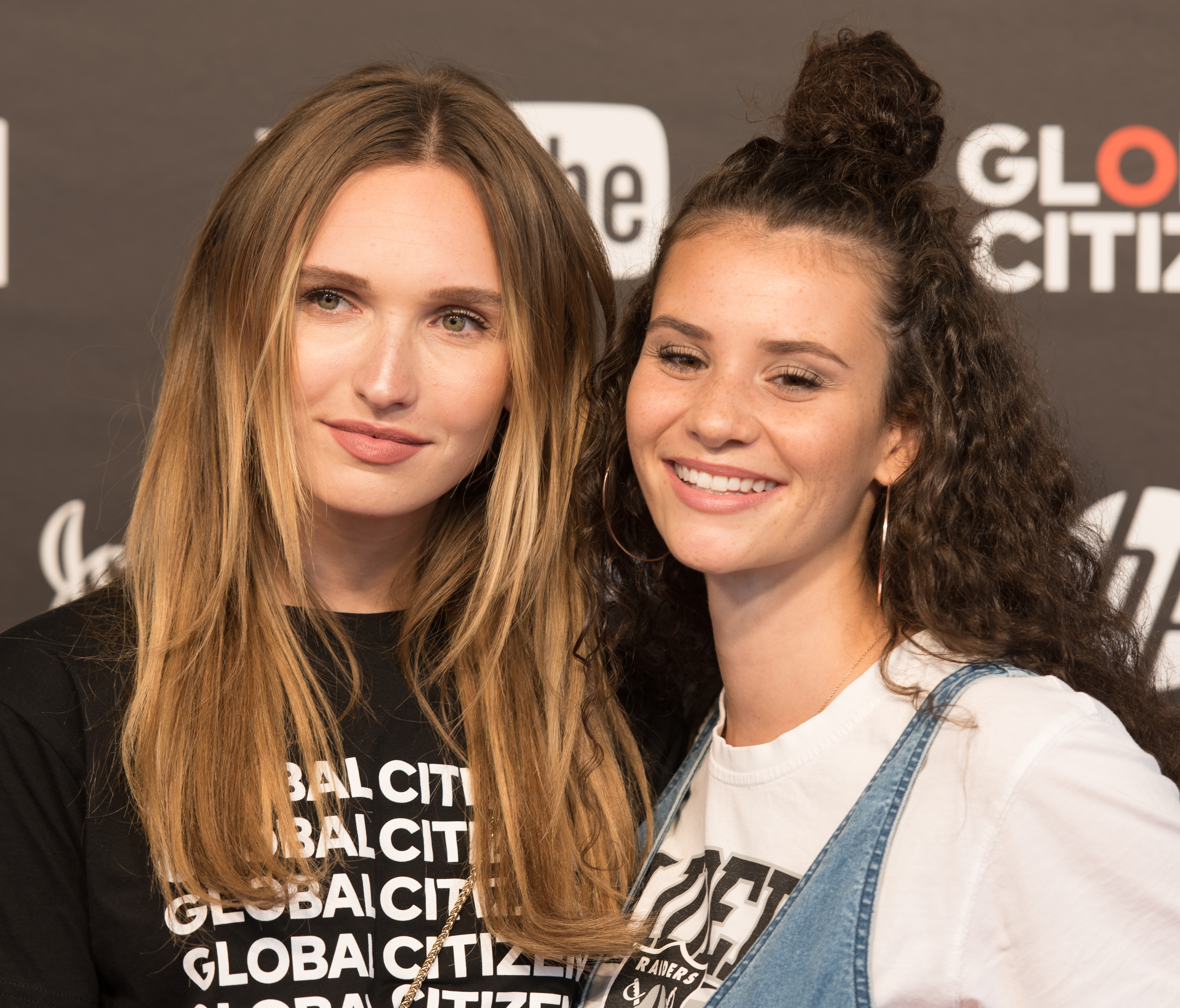
Anna Wilken and Betty Taube,
GNTM, season 9

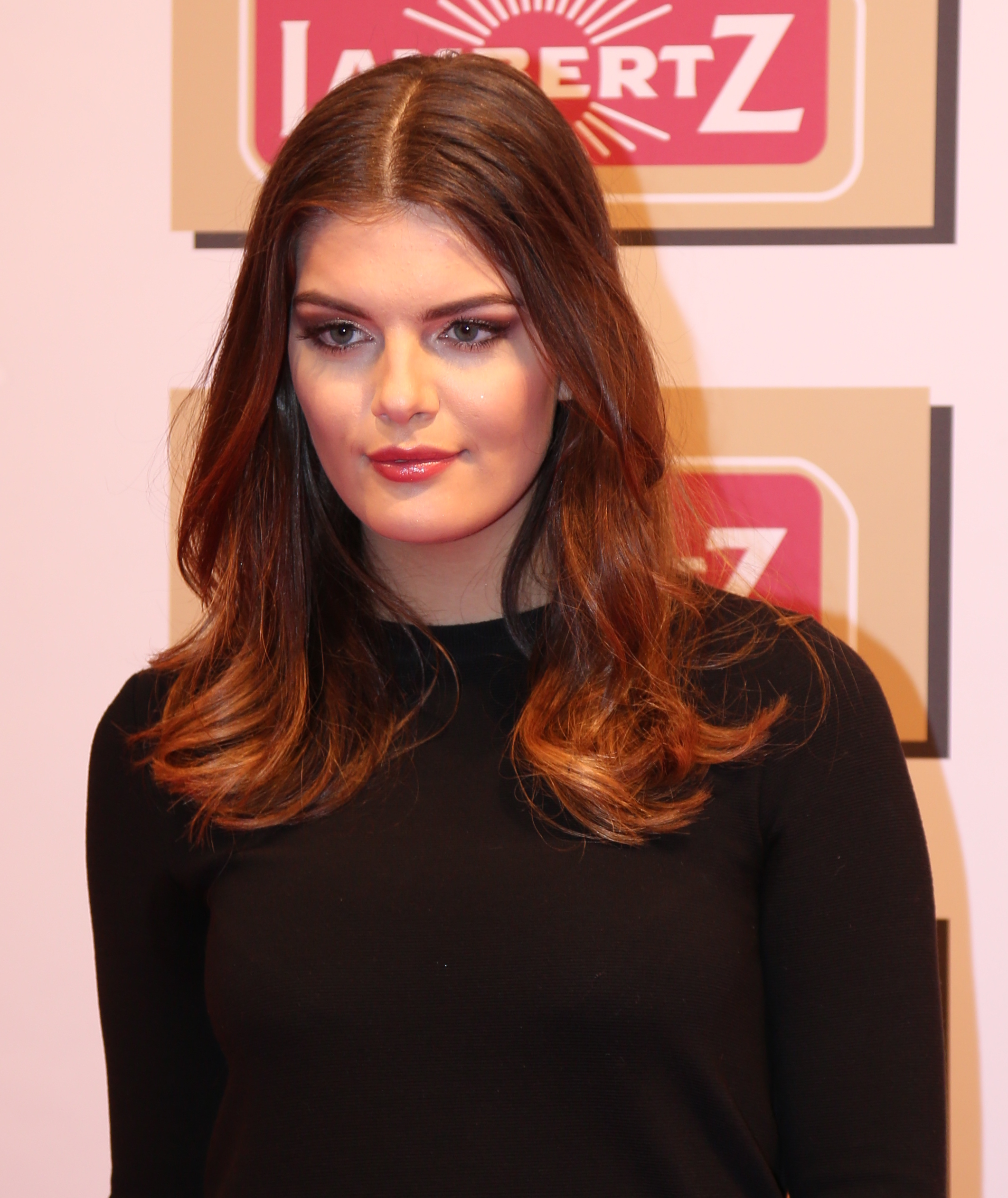
Vanessa Fuchs,
winner of GNTM, season 10

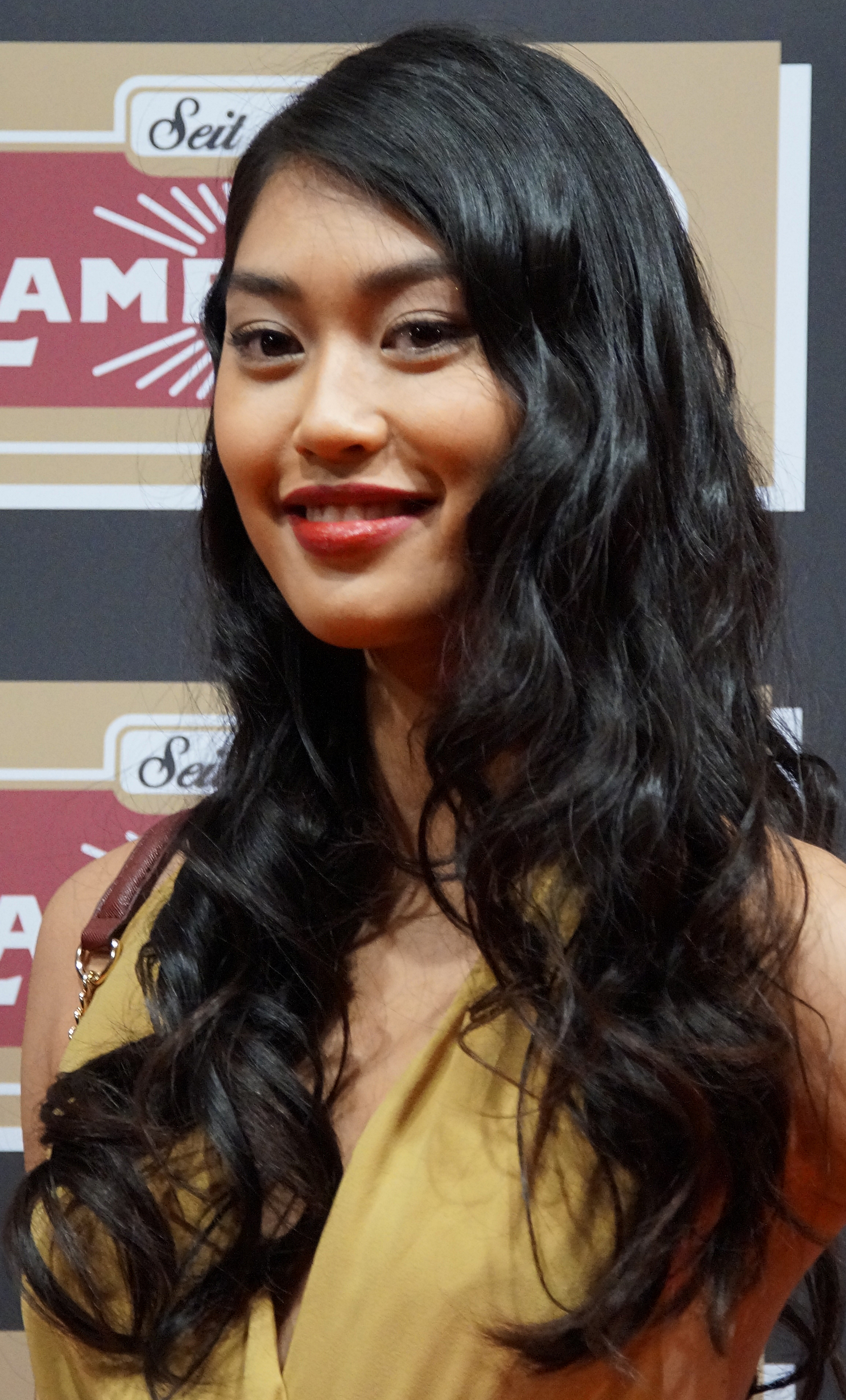
Anuthida Ploypetch,
runner-up of GNTM, season 10

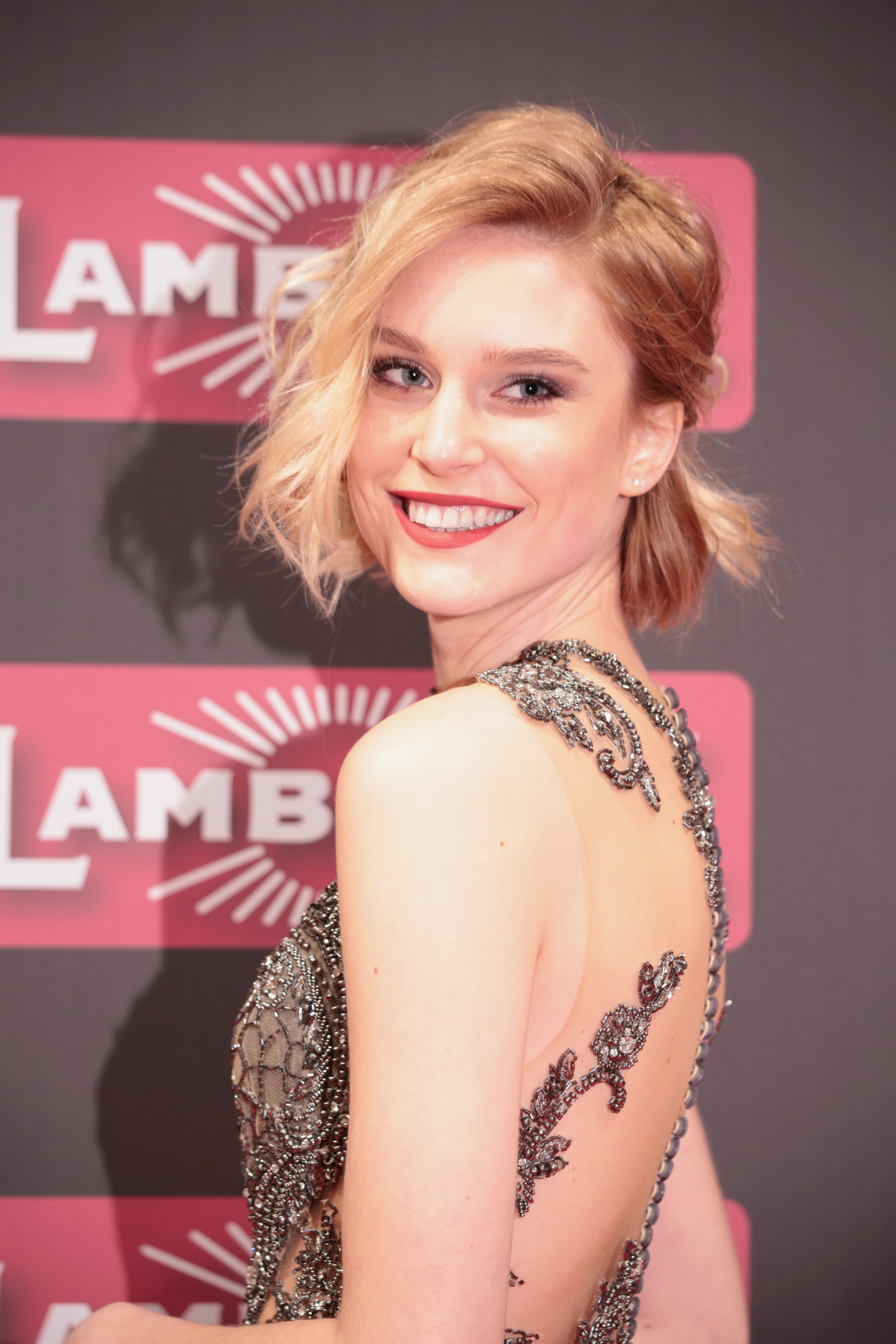
Kim Hnizdo,
winner of GNTM, season 11

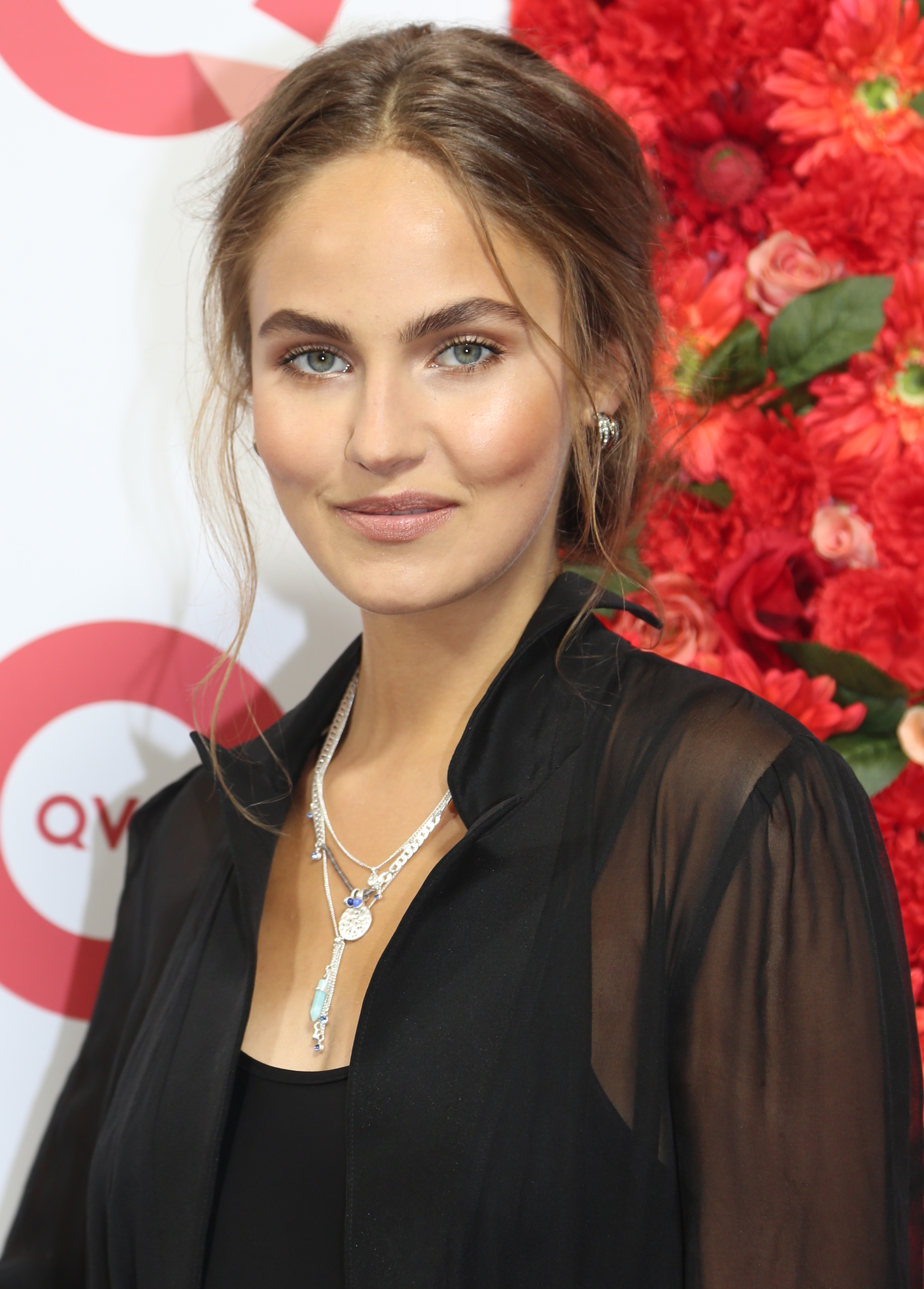
Elena Carrière,
runner-up of GNTM, season 11

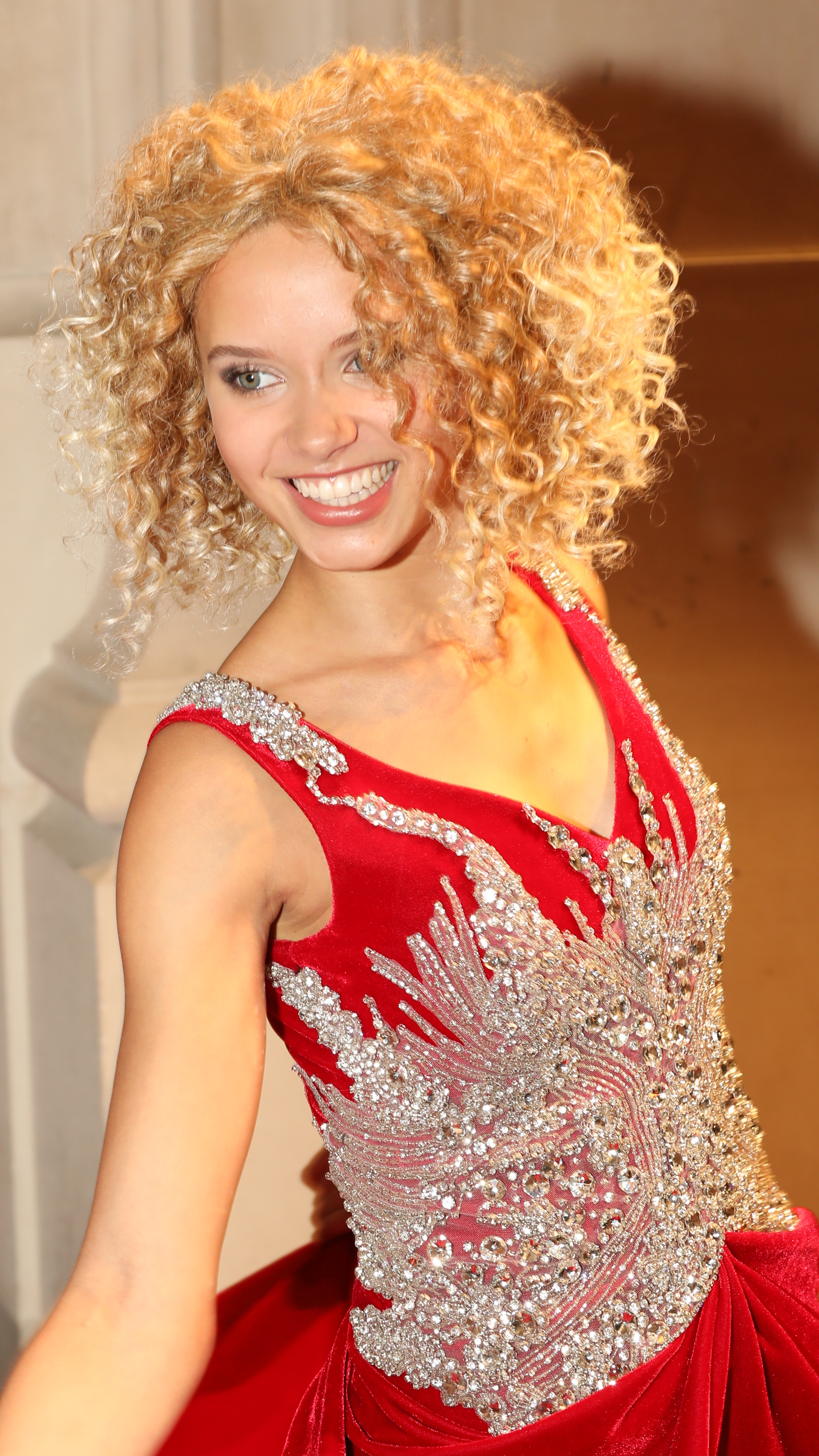
Taynara Silva Wolf,
GNTM, season 11

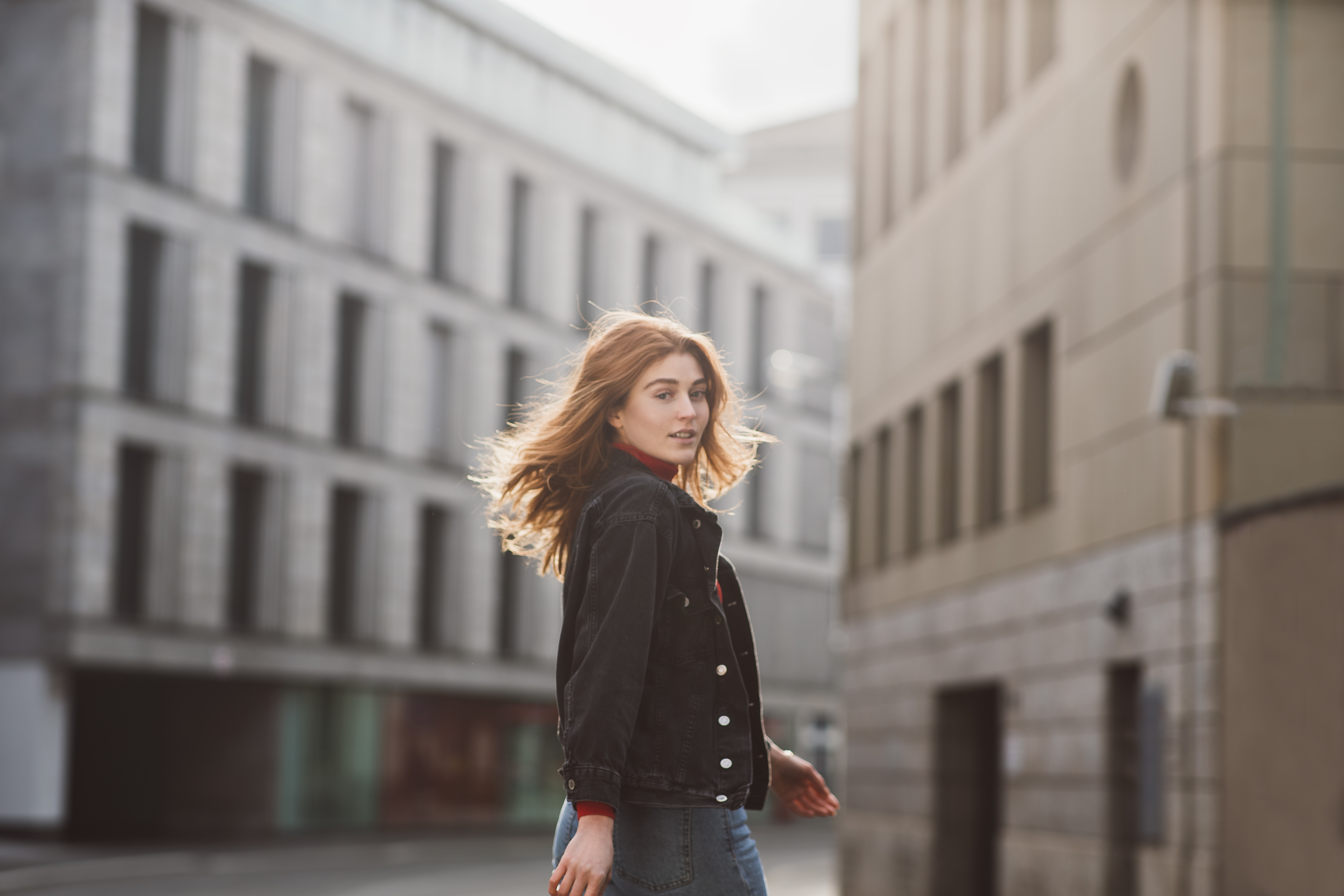
Lena Schreiber,
GNTM, season 16

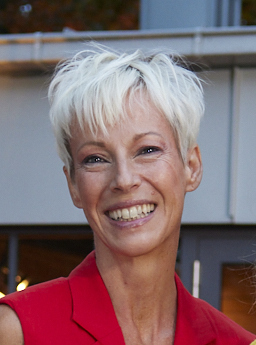
Martina Gleissenebner Teskey,
GNTM, season 17
