= Milla von Krockow =

21st-century German model and noblewoman

- Born: Michaela Saskia Gräfin von Krockow; 1986 or 1987 (age 39–40); Göttingen, West Germany
- Occupation: fashion model, television personality, businesswoman

Countess Michaela Saskia von Krockow (German: Michaela Saskia Gräfin von Krockow; born 1986 or 1987), known professionally as Milla von Krockow, is a German fashion model. She placed seventh in the second season of the German competitive reality television series Germany's Next Topmodel.

Krockow is a descendant of the old West Prussian Noble House Krockow, a Pomeranian Lineage of the Uradel.

In 2007 Krockow was a contestant on the second season of Heidi Klum's reality television competition series Germany's Next Topmodel on the ProSieben network and came in seventh place. After the season ended, Krockow was signed with ProSieben's modeling agency for two years.

After her two-year contract with ProSieben ended, she signed with Louisa Models in Munich and Satory Model Management in Berlin. In 2007 Krockow was featured on the cover of Talbot Runhof and C&A. She also modeled in an advertisement campaign for Laux Design.

Krockow went to school for sociology, economic and social psychology, and marketing while modeling professionally. Upon finishing school, she began working in the marketing department of a publishing house in Göttingen.
