= Austria's Next Topmodel season 6 =

Austria's Next Topmodel
- Season 6
- Starring: Melanie Scheriau; Papis Loveday; Michael Urban; Bianca Schwarzjirg; Larissa Marolt
- No. of episodes: 13

Release
- Original network: Puls 4
- Original release: 11 September – 4 December 2014

Season chronology
- ← Previous; Season 5 Next → Season 7

Austria's Next Topmodel – Boys & Girls (stylized as Austria's Next Topmodel boysןɹıƃ), the sixth season of Austria's Next Topmodel, aired from September to December 2014. Model Melanie Scheriau returned to present the series for a second season, while panelists Carmen Kreuzer and Rolf Scheider were replaced by male models Papis Loveday and Michael Urban. Two major changes were made to the series' format for the season: as on America's Next Top Model, the series featured both female and male contestants, and a public voting system was implemented. Bianca Schwarzjirg equaled the role of Bryanboy on America's Next Top Model, retrieving and delivering the results of the public vote. Also a mentor to the contestants was season 1 winner Larissa Marolt.

Parts of the season were filmed in Nicosia, Milan, London and Berlin. The winner of the competition was 19-year-old Oliver Stummvoll from Böheimkirchen. As his prizes, he received a contract with Vienna-based modeling agency Wiener Models, a cover of German GQ magazine, a position as the face of Prinzenzauber jewellery and a Ford Fiesta. Stummvoll was the first male winner of the Top Model franchise.

== Format change ==
Much like its American counterpart, the social media scoring system was also implemented this season. In contrast to the American adaptation however, each voter is required to cast their votes via Facebook. Furthermore, there is no grading scale. Each Facebook account is allotted three votes, which can be spent on any combination of contestants. The contestant with the highest number of votes each round is granted immunity, while the contestant with the lowest amount is automatically nominated for elimination along with three other contestants chosen by the judges.

== Contestants ==
Contestant	Age	Height	Hometown	Finish	Place
Stella Challiot	18	1.71 m (5 ft 7 1/2 in)	Linz	Episode 1	18
Anna-Maria Jurisic	17	1.78 m (5 ft 10 in)	Vienna	Episode 2	17
Sylvia Mankowska	17	1.77 m (5 ft 9 1/2 in)	Vienna	Episode 3	16
Michael Molterer	24	1.83 m (6 ft 0 in)	Sankt Pölten	Episode 4	15
Mario Novak	19	1.84 m (6 ft 1/2 in)	Linz	Episode 7	14
Michelle Hübner	22	1.80 m (5 ft 11 in)	Neusiedl am See	Episode 7	13–12
René Neßler	22	1.85 m (6 ft 1 in)	Feldkirch	Episode 7	13–12
Myroslav 'Miro' Slavov	23	1.95 m (6 ft 5 in)	Vienna	Episode 8	11–10
Carina Kriechhammer	17	1.73 m (5 ft 8 in)	Salzburg	Episode 8	11–10
Sonja Plöchl	17	1.74 m (5 ft 8 1/2 in)	Freistadt	Episode 9	9 (quit)
Kajetan Gerharter	20	1.86 m (6 ft 1 in)	Ramsau am Dachstein	Episode 11	8
Christoph Tauber Romieri	28	1.85 m (6 ft 1 in)	Sankt Pölten	Episode 11	7
Damir Jovanovic	25	1.85 m (6 ft 1 in)	Baden bei Wien	Episode 12	6–5
Lydia Zoglmeier	22	1.73 m (5 ft 8 in)	Breitenau am Hochlantsch	Episode 12	6–5
Manuel Stummvoll	19	1.86 m (6 ft 1 in)	Böheimkirchen	Episode 13	4
Manuela Kral	17	1.78 m (5 ft 10 in)	Magdalensberg	Episode 13	3
Sanela Velagic	22	1.80 m (5 ft 11 in)	Innsbruck	Episode 13	2
Oliver Stummvoll	18	1.83 m (6 ft 0 in)	Böheimkirchen	Episode 13	1

== Episodes ==
=== Episode 1 ===
Original airdate: September 11, 2014

Models	Theme
Carina, Manuel, Michelle & Oliver	Wrestling
Anna-Maria, Manuela, Mario & Michael	Pillow fight
Christoph, Kajetan, Miro, Sylvia	Firefighters
René & Sonja	Samurai
Damir, Lydia, Sanela & Stella	Nude art class

- Granted immunity by the public: Anna-Maria Jurisic
- Nominated for elimination by the public: Sanela Velagic
- Nominated for elimination by the judges: Carina Kriechhammer, Stella Schaljo & Sylvia Mankowska
- Bottom four: Carina Kriechhammer, Sanela Velagic, Stella Challiot & Sylvia Mankowska
- Eliminated: Stella Challiot
- Featured photographer: Stefan Armbruster

=== Episode 2 ===
Original airdate: September 18, 2014

- Granted immunity by the public: Carina Kriechhammer
- Nominated for elimination by the public: Mario Novak
- Nominated for elimination by the judges: Anna-Maria Jurisic, Damir Jovanovic & Sylvia Mankowska
- Bottom four: Anna-Maria Jurisic, Damir Jovanovic, Mario Novak & Sylvia Mankowska
- Eliminated: Anna-Maria Jurisic
- Featured photographer: Kosmas Pavlos
- Special guests: Larissa Marolt

=== Episode 3 ===
Original airdate: September 25, 2014

- Immune: Kajetan Gerharter, Manuel Stummvoll, Miro Slavov & Oliver Stummvoll
- Granted immunity by the public: Damir Jovanovic
- Nominated for elimination by the public: Mario Novak
- Nominated for elimination by the judges: Lydia Zoglmeier, René Neßler & Sylvia Mankowska
- Bottom four: Lydia Zoglmeier, Mario Novak, René Neßler & Sylvia Mankowska
- Eliminated: Sylvia Mankowska

=== Episode 4 ===
Original airdate: October 2, 2014

- Granted immunity by the public: Damir Jovanovic
- Nominated for elimination by the public: Manuel Stummvoll
- Nominated for elimination by the judges: Manuela Kral, Michael Molterer & Miro Slavov
- Bottom four: Manuel Stummvoll, Manuela Kral, Michael Molterer & Miro Slavov
- Eliminated: Michael Molterer

=== Episode 5 ===
Original airdate: October 9, 2014

- Granted immunity by the public: Damir Jovanovic
- Nominated for elimination by the public: Manuel Stummvoll
- Nominated for elimination by the judges: Michelle Hübner & René Neßler
- Bottom three: Manuel Stummvoll, Michelle Hübner & René Neßler
- Eliminated: Manuel Stummvoll

=== Episode 6 ===
Original airdate: October 16, 2014

Group
Carina & René
Chris & Sonja
Damir & Sanela
Kajetan & Manuela
Lydia & Miro
Michelle & Oliver
Mario & Michelle

- Granted immunity by the public: Damir Jovanovic
- Nominated for elimination by the public: Mario Novak
- Nominated for elimination by the judges: Carina Kriechhammer, Michelle Hübner & Sonja Plöchl
- Bottom four: Carina Kriechhammer, Mario Novak, Michelle Hübner & Sonja Plöchl
- Eliminated: None

=== Episode 7 ===
Original airdate: October 23, 2014

- Eliminated outside of judging panel: Mario Novak
- Granted immunity by the public: Carina Kriechhammer
- Nominated for elimination by the public: Miro Slavov
- Nominated for elimination by the judges: Michelle Hübner, René Neßler & Sonja Plöchl
- Bottom four: Michelle Hübner, Miro Slavov, René Neßler & Sonja Plöchl
- Eliminated: Michelle Hübner & René Neßler

=== Episode 8 ===
Original airdate: October 30, 2014

- Granted immunity by the public: Oliver Stummvoll
- Nominated for elimination by the public: Miro Slavov
- Nominated for elimination by the judges: Carina Kriechhammer, Lydia Zoglmeier & Sanela Velagic
- Bottom four: Carina Kriechhammer, Lydia Zoglmeier, Miro Slavov & Sanela Velagic
- Eliminated: Carina Kriechhammer & Miro Slavov
- Returned: Manuel Stummvoll

=== Episode 9 ===
Original airdate: November 6, 2014

- Granted immunity by the public: Oliver Stummvoll
- Nominated for elimination by the judges: Kajetan Gerharter, Lydia Zoglmeier & Manuela Kral
- Nominated for elimination by the public: Sonja Plöchl
- Quit: Sonja Plöchl
- Bottom three: Kajetan Gerharter, Lydia Zoglmeier & Manuela Kral
- Eliminated: None

=== Episode 10 ===
Original airdate: November 13, 2014

- Granted immunity by the public: Oliver Stummvoll
- Nominated for elimination by the public: Sanela Velagic
- Nominated for elimination by the judges: Christoph Tauber Romieri, Damir Jovanovic & Kajetan Gerharter
- Bottom four: Christoph Tauber Romieri, Damir Jovanovic, Kajetan Gerharter & Sanela Velagic
- Eliminated: None

=== Episode 11 ===
Original airdate: November 20, 2014

- Eliminated outside of judging panel: Kajetan Gerharter
- Granted immunity by the public: Oliver Stummvoll
- Nominated for elimination by the public: Manuela Kral
- Nominated for elimination by the judges: Christoph Tauber Romieri & Manuel Stummvoll
- Bottom three: Christoph Tauber Romieri, Manuel Stummvoll & Manuela Kral
- Eliminated: Christoph Tauber Romieri

=== Episode 12 ===
Original airdate: November 27, 2014

- Granted immunity by the public: Oliver Stummvoll
- First eliminated: Sanela Velagic
- Second eliminated: Damir Jovanovic
- Bottom two: Lydia Zoglmeier & Manuela Kral
- Eliminated: Lydia Zoglmeier

=== Episode 13 ===
Original airdate: December 4, 2014

- Returned: Sanela Velagic
- Final four: Manuel Stummvoll, Manuela Kral, Oliver Stummvoll & Sanela Velagic
- First eliminated: Manuel Stummvoll
- Final three: Manuela Kral, Oliver Stummvoll & Sanela Velagic
- Second eliminated: Manuela Kral
- Final two: Oliver Stummvoll & Sanela Velagic
- Austria's Next Top Model: Oliver Stummvoll

== Summaries ==
Place	Model	Episodes														
Place	Model	1	2	3	4	5	6	7	8	9	10	11	12	13		
1	Oliver	SAFE	SAFE	IMM	SAFE	SAFE	SAFE	SAFE	IMM	IMM	IMM	IMM	IMM	SAFE	SAFE	Winner
2	Sanela	LOW	SAFE	SAFE	SAFE	SAFE	SAFE	SAFE	LOW	SAFE	LOW	LOW	OUT	SAFE	SAFE	OUT
3	Manuela	SAFE	SAFE	SAFE	LOW	SAFE	SAFE	SAFE	SAFE	LOW	SAFE	LOW	LOW	LOW	OUT	
4	Manuel	SAFE	SAFE	IMM	LOW	OUT				SAFE	SAFE	LOW	LOW	OUT		
5-6	Damir	SAFE	LOW	IMM	IMM	IMM	IMM	SAFE	SAFE	SAFE	LOW	LOW	OUT			
5-6	Lydia	SAFE	SAFE	LOW	SAFE	SAFE	SAFE	SAFE	LOW	LOW	SAFE	SAFE	OUT			
7	Christoph	SAFE	SAFE	SAFE	SAFE	SAFE	SAFE	SAFE	SAFE	SAFE	LOW	OUT				
8	Kajetan	SAFE	SAFE	IMM	SAFE	SAFE	SAFE	SAFE	SAFE	LOW	LOW	OUT				
9	Sonja	SAFE	SAFE	SAFE	SAFE	SAFE	LOW	LOW	LOW	QUIT						
10-11	Carina	LOW	IMM	SAFE	SAFE	SAFE	LOW	IMM	OUT							
10-11	Miro	SAFE	SAFE	IMM	LOW	SAFE	SAFE	LOW	OUT							
12-13	Rene	SAFE	SAFE	LOW	LOW	LOW	LOW	OUT								
12-13	Michelle	SAFE	SAFE	SAFE	SAFE	LOW	LOW	OUT								
14	Mario	SAFE	LOW	LOW	SAFE	SAFE	LOW	OUT								
15	Michael	SAFE	SAFE	SAFE	OUT											
16	Sylvia	LOW	LOW	OUT												
17	Anna-Maria	IMM	OUT													
18	Stella	OUT														

The contestant was eliminated outside of judging panel
The contestant quit the competition
The contestant was immune from elimination
The contestant was in danger of elimination
The contestant was eliminated
The contestant won the competition

=== Photo shoot guide ===
- Episode 1 photo shoot: Fight of the sexes
- Episode 2 photo shoot: B&W sedcards; swimwear in Cyprus
- Episode 3 photo shoot: Jumping into a pool with inflatables
- Episode 4 photo shoot: Hanging from a ferris wheel
- Episode 5 photo shoot: S&M bats hanging upside down
- Episode 6 photo shoot: Waltzing in pairs
- Episode 7 photo shoot: Jumping samurais
- Episode 8 photo shoot: Horror in a graveyard
- Episode 9 photo shoot: 3D characters with reptiles and insects
- Episode 10 photo shoot: Sweet decadence
- Episode 11 photo shoot: Nude in pairs as Adam and Eve
- Episode 12 photo shoot: GQ magazine covers

== Judges ==
- Melanie Scheriau (host)
- Papis Loveday
- Michael Urban
