= Austria's Next Topmodel season 9 =

Austria's Next Topmodel
- Season 9
- Starring: Franziska Knuppe; Sascha Lilic
- No. of episodes: 9

Release
- Original network: Puls 4
- Original release: 10 September – 5 November 2019

Season chronology
- ← Previous season 8

Austria's Next Topmodel, season 9 is the ninth season of the Austrian reality television show in which a number of women compete for the title of Austria's Next Topmodel and a chance to start their career in the modelling industry. The series returned to an all-female cast for the first time since season 5. This season will be broadcast on Puls 4.

Among with the prizes is: a contract with Vienna-based modeling agency Wiener Models, on the cover of Style Up Your Life! magazine, a campaign for Leo Hillinger cosmetic, a cruise trip for two to Gran Canaria courtesy of AIDA Cruises and an all-new Opel Corsa.

The winner of the season was 23 year old Taibeh Ahmadi from Vienna.

== Contestants ==
Contestant	Age	Height	From	Finish	Place
Tamara Strasser	24	1.71 m (5 ft 7 1/2 in)	Haiming	Episode 2	11 (quit)
Sophie Danzinger	18	1.71 m (5 ft 7 1/2 in)	Vienna	Episode 2	10
Julie Chavanne	23	1.74 m (5 ft 8 1/2 in)	Vienna	Episode 4	9
Verena-Katrien 'Verena' Gamlich	28	1.71 m (5 ft 7 1/2 in)	Vienna	Episode 4	8 (quit)
Josephine 'Josi' Jochmann	25	1.80 m (5 ft 11 in)	Mainz, Germany	Episode 5	7
Lisa Schranz	17	1.72 m (5 ft 7 1/2 in)	Salzburg	Episode 7	6
Valentina Kandlhofer	17	1.77 m (5 ft 9 1/2 in)	Pöllauberg	Episode 8	5
Baraa Bolat	24	1.73 m (5 ft 8 in)	Vienna	Episode 9	4
Rosa Oesterreicher	17	1.70 m (5 ft 7 in)	Vienna	Episode 9	3-2
Julia Neumeister	24	1.70 m (5 ft 7 in)	Graz	Episode 9	3-2
Taibeh Ahmadi	23	1.73 m (5 ft 8 in)	Vienna	Episode 9	1

== Episodes ==
=== Episode 1 ===
Original airdate: September 10, 2019

- Challenge winners: Julia Neumeister & Verena Katrien
- Bottom two: Julia Neumeister & Julie Chavanne
- Eliminated: None

=== Episode 2 ===
Original airdate: September 17, 2019

- Challenge winners: Josi Jochmann & Lisa Schranz
- Booked for job: Julia Neumeister
- Bottom two: Sophie Danzinger & Tamara Strasser
- Quit: Tamara Strasser
- Eliminated: Sophie Danzinger
- Guest judge: Oliver Stummvoll

=== Episode 3 ===
Original airdate: September 24, 2019

- Challenge winners: Rosa Oesterreicher & Valentina Kandlhofer
- Bottom two: Julie Chavanne & Josi Jochmann
- Eliminated: None
- Guest judge: Papis Loveday

=== Episode 4 ===
Original airdate: October 1, 2019

- Challenge winners: Lisa Schranz & Rosa Oesterreicher
- Bottom two: Julie Chavanne & Taibeh Ahmadi
- Eliminated: Julie Chavanne
- Quit: Verena Gamlich
- Guest judge: Leo Hillinger

=== Episode 5 ===
Original airdate: October 8, 2019

- Booked for job: Julia Neumeister
- Bottom four: Josi Jochmann, Lisa Schranz, Rosa Oesterreicher & Valentina Kandlhofer
- Eliminated: Josi Jochmann
- Guest judge: Vanessa von Zitzewitz

=== Episode 6 ===
Original airdate: October 15, 2019

- Bottom three: Julia Neumeister, Taibeh Ahmadi & Valentina Kandlhofer
- Eliminated: None
- Guest judge: Karina Sarkissova

=== Episode 7 ===
Original airdate: October 22, 2019

- Added to the cast: Baraa Bolat
- Booked for job: Taibeh Ahmadi
- Bottom two: Lisa Schranz & Valentina Kandlhofer
- Eliminated: Lisa Schranz
- Guest judge: Daniel Lismore

=== Episode 8 ===
Original airdate: October 29, 2019

- Booked for job: Rosa Oesterreicher
- Bottom three: Julia Neumeister, Taibeh Ahmadi & Valentina Kandlhofer
- Eliminated: Valentina Kandlhofer
- Guest judge: Donatella Versace

=== Episode 9 ===
Original airdate: November 5, 2019

- Top Four: Baraa Bolat, Julia Neumeister, Rosa Oesterreicher & Taibeh Ahmadi
- Eliminated: Baraa Bolat
- Top Three: Julia Neumeister, Rosa Oesterreicher & Taibeh Ahmadi
- Austria's Next Topmodel: Taibeh Ahmadi
- Guest judges: Adi Weiss & Michael Lameraner

== Results ==
Place	Model	Episodes									
Place	Model	1	2 (Note: In episode 2, whilst being in the bottom two Tamara withdrew from the competition. Sophie was eliminated regardless.)	3 (Note: Episode 3 ended with a cliffhanger with Josi and Julie being in the bottom two. At the beginning of the next episode it was revealed that nobody was eliminated.)	4 (Note: In episode 4, right after Julie's elimination Verena quit the competition.)	5	6	7 (Note: In episode 7, Baraa entered the competition.)	8	9	
1	Taibeh	SAFE	SAFE	SAFE	LOW	SAFE	LOW	SAFE	LOW	SAFE	Winner
2-3	Julia	LOW	SAFE	SAFE	SAFE	SAFE	LOW	SAFE	LOW	SAFE	OUT
2-3	Rosa	SAFE	SAFE	SAFE	SAFE	LOW	SAFE	SAFE	SAFE	SAFE	OUT
4	Baraa							SAFE	SAFE	OUT	
5	Valentina	SAFE	SAFE	SAFE	SAFE	LOW	LOW	LOW	OUT		
6	Lisa	SAFE	SAFE	SAFE	SAFE	LOW	LOW	OUT			
7	Josi	SAFE	SAFE	LOW	SAFE	OUT					
8	Verena	SAFE	SAFE	SAFE	QUIT						
9	Julie	LOW	SAFE	LOW	OUT						
10	Sophie	SAFE	OUT								
11	Tamara	SAFE	QUIT								

The contestant was in danger of elimination.
The contestant quit the competition.
The contestant was eliminated.

== Notes ==
=== Photo shoot guide ===
- Episode 1 photo shoot: Posing on a Formula One car with Mika Häkkinen
- Episode 2 photo shoot: Sed card shoot
- Episode 3 photo shoot: Gymnastics on a Diving Board
- Episode 4 photo shoot: Emotions in a club
- Episode 5 photo shoot: Vintage pin-up girls
- Episode 6 photo shoot: Posing as elegant Ballerinas
- Episode 7 photo shoot: Living Art
- Episode 8 photo shoot: Posing on a Surfboard
- Episode 9 photo shoot: Cover for Style Up Your Life
