= Austria's Next Topmodel =

- Genre: Reality television
- Created by: Tyra Banks
- Presented by: Franziska Knuppe (9); Former; Lena Gercke (1-4); Melanie Scheriau (5-7); Eveline Hall (8)
- Judges: Fraziska Knuppe. (9); Marina Hoermanseder (8); Daniel Bamdad (8); Former; Eveline Hall (8); Papis Loveday (6-7); Michael Urban (6-7); Rolf Scheider (5); Carmen Kreuzer (5); Atil Kutoglu (3-4); Elvyra Geyer (3-4); Andrea Weidler (1-2); Andreas Ortner(2); Sabine Landl (2); Alamande Belfor (1)
- Opening theme: Vera Böhnisch - "Take Me Higher" (1); Cobra Starship - "Good Girls Go Bad" (2); Victoria S - "One in a Million" (3); Jason Derulo - "Breathing" (4); Zedd - "Spectrum" (5); Leona Lewis - "Fire Under My Feet" (7); Felix Jaehn - "Hot2Touch" (8)
- Country of origin: Austria
- No. of seasons: 9
- No. of episodes: 89

Production
- Running time: 120 mins

Original release
- Network: Puls 4 (2009–16, 2019); ATV (2017)
- Release: 8 January 2009 – 5 November 2019

Austria's Next Topmodel is an Austrian competition reality television series based on Tyra Banks's America's Next Top Model.

== History ==
The show was hosted by Lena Gercke, the winner of the first cycle of Germany's Next Topmodel. Gercke is the first Top Model winner to become the host of a Top Model series. The judging panel for the show's first cycle consisted of the head of Vienna-based modeling agency Wiener Models, Andrea Weidler, and runway coach Alamanda Belfor. It aired from January to February 2009 and was won by Larissa Marolt. As part of her prize package for winning the contest, Marolt won a place on the fourth cycle of Germany's Next Top model, where she placed eighth.

In mid-2009, Puls 4 aired a spin-off of the show Die Model WG, which featured six of cycle one's contestants. The show was won by Kordula Stöckl.

The second cycle aired from November 2009 to February 2010. Its catchphrase was "More girls, more jet set, more glamour." Former model and photographer Andreas Ortner joined the judging panel, replacing Alamanda Belfor. Beauty expert Sabine Landl, the models' stylist in cycle 1, also joined the panel. The winner of the cycle was Aylin Kösetürk.

The third cycle premiered in January 2011 and introduced new judges: the designer Atıl Kutoğlu and the runway coach Elvyra Geyer. Gercke remained the host. The cycle featured a significant change in the cast, with one girl per federal state and five wildcards. Additionally, in every episode, competitors that won the casting traveled to an international destination.

Gercke did not return to host the fifth cycle, opting instead to concentrate on her own modeling career. In January 2013 Austrian model Melanie Scheriau took over as host. The sixth cycle aired in late 2014. Cycle 7 aired from late 2015 to spring 2016, cycle 8 began in November 2017, and cycle 9 ran in 2019.

Males were introduced to the competition in the sixth cycle of the show. The social media scoring system used in the American version of the show was also implemented in the sixth cycle. In contrast to the American version of the show, each voter was required to cast their votes via Facebook. Furthermore, there was no grading scale. Each Facebook account was allotted three votes, which could be spent on any combination of contestants. The competitor with the highest number of votes in each round was granted immunity. At the same time, the contestant with the lowest amount was automatically nominated for elimination, along with three other contestants chosen by the judges.

The ProSiebenSat.1 Media group announced in April 2017 that the eighth cycle would air on ATV Austria, thus temporarily moving the show from Puls 4. Cycle 9 was again broadcast by Puls 4.

=== Judges ===
Judges	Cycles								
Judges	1 (2009)	2 (2009–2010)	3 (2011)	4 (2012)	5 (2013)	6 (2014)	7 (2015–2016)	8 (2017)	9 (2019)
Hosts
Lena Gercke	Main	Main	Main	Main					
Melanie Scheriau					Main	Main	Main		
Eveline Hall								Main	
Franziska Knuppe									Main
Judging Panelists
Allemande Belfor	Main								
Andrea Weidler	Main	Main		Guest					
Sabine Landl	Guest	Main							
Andreas Ortner		Main		Guest					
Elvyra Geyer		Guest	Main	Main					
Atil Kutoglu	Guest		Main	Main					
Carmen Kreuzer				Guest	Main				
Rolf Scheider					Main				
Papis Loveday						Main	Main		Guest
Michael Urban						Main	Main		
Daniel Bamdad								Main	
Marina Hoermanseder								Main	
Sascha Lilic									Main

== Controversies ==
=== Show title ===
Before the show began, it caused controversy due to another modeling contest named Österreichs (German for "Austria's") Next Top model, established in 2007. Dominik Wachta, the founder of what can be described as a mix between model casting and a beauty pageant, accused the TV channel Puls 4 of stealing his idea. Further steps to change the name of the show were unsuccessful as it was already licensed by CBS as the role-model version created by Tyra Banks.

=== Racism controversy ===
In the third cycle, contestant Magalie Berghahn was eliminated from the show due to the racist comments she made during a phone conversation with her boyfriend. She referred to fellow competitor Lydia Nnenna Obute as "Neger Oide" (derogatory Austrian slang for "black woman") and to Vanessa Lotz as "Dietsche" (slang for "German woman"). Both Obute and Lotz won a "go-see" in that episode. The conversation was fully taped and aired during the show. Lena Gercke, the host, presented video evidence to Berkhahn in the presence of the other two girls, initiating a confrontation. Gercke then told Berghahn that she was expelled from the show because the competition had no room for racist ideas or thoughts. Puls 4 was later accused of using the controversy for promotional purposes, as Berghahn's comments had already been shown in the preview for the episode and were not censored when the episode aired. Berkhahn was not invited to the final runway show during the cycle's finale. Berkhahn later stated that the scandal had ruined her life.

=== Death of Sabrina Rauch ===
In January 2012, 21-year-old Sabrina Angelika Rauch (a cycle 4 contestant) died in a car crash after spinning out of control on her way home from a party. Her vehicle collided with a concrete mast, when Rauch was killed instantly at the scene of the accident. Her co-driver, a 26-year-old male friend, survived the accident. Only three days before the episode featuring Rauch's elimination was aired, a nude photo from a shoot she did before her participation on the show was exposed. She was confronted by the judges for having taken the photos, and the judges stated that it was 'too low for a top model' while the other contestants witnessed the scene. In addition, a friend of Rauch criticized the program for editing that specific scene. At the beginning of the next episode of the show, the broadcast station expressed their condolences to Rauch's relatives and friends on a silent screen.

== Cycles ==
Cycle	Premiere date	Winner	Runner-up	Other contestants in order of elimination	Number of contestants	International Destinations
1	8 January 2009	Larissa Marolt	Victoria Hooper	Piroschka Khyo, Birgit Königstorfer, Christiane Pliem & Kordula Stöckl, Julia Mähder, Kim Sade-Tiroch, Constanzia Delort-Laval, Tamara Puljarevic	10	Milan
2	25 November 2009	Aylin Kösetürk	Sarah Unterberger	Julia Huber, Lisa Schottak (quit), Angelika Czapka, Manuela Frey & Vanessa Hooper, Iris Shala, Anna Steinwendner, Jennifer Kogler, Lina Köberl, Johanna Gruber, Nina Kollmann	13	Istanbul; Athens; London; Paris; Cape Town
3	6 January 2011	Lydia Obute	Katharina Theuermann	Lisa Berghold (quit), Victoria Vogeler, Sarah Preiml, Magalie Berghahn (disqualified), Nadine Oberteiler, Linda Linorter, Vanessa Lotz & Valerie Heidenreich, Nicole Gerzabek, Julia Trummer, Darija Gavric, Romana Gruber	14	New York City
4	12 January 2012	Antonia Hausmair	Gina Adamu	Isabelle Raisa & Alina Chlebecek, Sabrina Rauch & Katharina Mihalovic, Nataša Maric, Michaela Schopf (quit), Christine Riener, Madalina Andreica, Yemisi Rieger, Izabela Pop Kostic, Nadine Trinker & Bianca Ebelsberger, Lana Baltic, Melisa Popanicic	16	Ibiza; Tel Aviv; Berlin; New York City
5	3 January 2013	Greta Uszkai	Katrin Krinner	Charlotte Rothpletz, Nadja Sejranic, Tatjana Catic (quit), Sabrina Kastner, Iris Mann, Sina Lisa Petru, Sabrina-Nathalie Reitz, Luca Stemer, Vanessa Rolke, Isabelle Postl & Charlotte Aichhorn, Stefanie Wedam, Aleksandra Stankovic	15	Hurghada
6	11 September 2014	Oliver Stummvoll	Sanela Velagic	Stella Challiot, Anna-Maria Jurisic, Sylvia Mankowska, Michael Molterer, Mario Novak, Michelle Hübner & René Neßler, Miro Slavov & Carina Kriechhammer, Sonja Plöchl (quit), Kajetan Gerharter, Christoph Tauber Romieri, Damir Jovanovic & Lydia Zoglmeier, Manuel Stummvoll, Manuela Kral	18	Paphos; Milan; Zurich; Berlin; Hong Kong
7	15 September 2015	Fabian Herzgsell	Angelina Stolz	Johannes Spilka, Felix Schiller, Lukas Krammer (quit) & Jelena Vujcic, Alexandra Kröpfl, Benedikt Cekolj, Adrian Oshioke, Bianca Konarzewski, Junel Anderson, Nicole Fried, Katja Peterka, Patrick Treffer, Maximiliano Mantovani (quit), Bernhard Stich, Melisa Sretkovic, Tassilo Herberstein, Gloria Burtscher, Mia Sabathy	20	Marrakesh; Milan; Berlin; Madrid; Hong Kong; Monte Carlo
8	2 November 2017	Isak Omorodion	Peter Mairhofer & Simone Sevignani	Theresa Steinkellner (quit), Christian Benesch, Jules Baumgartner & Doina Barbaneagra, Edvin Franijc, Daniela Kuperion, Julia Forstner & Lukas Schlinger, Sanda Gutic & Max Gombocz, Allegra Bell	14	Helsinki; Stockholm
9	10 September 2019	Taibeh Ahmadi	Julia Neumeister & Rosa Oesterreicher	Tamara Strasser (quit) & Sophie Danzinger, Julie Chavanne & Verena Gamlich (quit), Josi Jochmann, Lisa Schranz, Valentina Kandlhofer, Baraa Bolat	11	Côte d’Azur; Monte Carlo
