= Austria's Next Topmodel season 3 =

Austria's Next Topmodel
- Season 3
- No. of episodes: 10

Release
- Original network: PULS4
- Original release: 6 January – 10 March 2011

Season chronology
- ← Previous; Season 2 Next → Season 4

Season 3 of Austria's Next Topmodel aired on Puls 4 from January to March 2011. The judging panel consisted of Lena Gercke, Elvyra Geyer, and Atil Kutoglu. Among the prizes were a cover on Austrian magazine Woman, the face of the newest Hervis campaign as well as two runway jobs at the Milan and Paris Fashion Week.

The first episode featured contestants in all nine Austrian federal states, and the top four from each state automatically qualified for a spot in the first episode. The top four competed again, with each state's favorite making the final cast directly. Five more contestants were granted wildcard spots, making 14 competing in the remaining episodes. Another change was that there was one casting to book in every episode where the actual job would take place abroad, however only the winner would be allowed to travel there. The only international destination where all cast members traveled was New York City.

== Episodes ==
=== Episode 1 ===
Original airdate: January 6, 2011

Episode 1 was the casting episode.

=== Episode 2 ===
Original airdate: January 13, 2011

- Quit: Lisa Berghold
- Challenge winner: Lydia Obute
- Booked for job/Immune: Vanessa Lotz
- Eliminated: Victoria Vogeler

=== Episode 3 ===
Original airdate: January 20, 2011

- Challenge winner: Darija Gavric
- Booked for job: Lydia Obute & Vanessa Lotz
- Bottom two: Sarah Preiml & Valerie Heidenreich
- Eliminated: Sarah Preiml

=== Episode 4 ===
Original airdate: January 27, 2011

- Challenge winner: Julia Trummer
- Booked for job: Lydia Obute & Magalie Berghahn
- Disqualified: Magalie Berghahn
- Bottom three: Linda Linortner, Nadine Oberleiter & Nicole Gerzabek
- Eliminated: See below

=== Episode 5 ===
Original airdate: February 3, 2011

- Eliminated (episode 4): Nadine Oberleiter
- Challenge winner: Lydia Obute
- Booked for job: Darija Gavric & Katharina Theuermann
- Bottom two: Linda Linortner & Valerie Heidenreich
- Eliminated: Linda Linortner

=== Episode 6 ===
Original airdate: February 10, 2011

- Booked for job: Darija Gavric, Lydia Obute, Romana Gruber & Vanessa Lotz
- Challenge winner: Nicole Gerzabek
- Eliminated: Valerie Heidenreich & Vanessa Lotz

=== Episode 7 ===
Original airdate: February 17, 2011

- Bottom two: Julia Trummer & Romana Gruber
- Eliminated: None

=== Episode 8 ===
Original airdate: February 24, 2011

- Bottom three: Darija Gavric, Julia Trummer & Nicole Gerzabek
- Eliminated: Nicole Gerzabek

=== Episode 9 ===
Original airdate: March 2, 2011

- Eliminated: Julia Trummer
- Bottom two: Katharina Theuermann & Romana Gruber
- Eliminated: None

=== Episode 10 ===
Original airdate: March 9, 2011

- Final four: Darija Gavric, Katharina Theuermann, Lydia Obute & Romana Gruber
- Eliminated: Darija Gavric
- Final three: Katharina Theuermann, Lydia Obute & Romana Gruber
- Eliminated: Romana Gruber
- Final two: Katharina Theuermann & Lydia Obute
- Austria's next topmodel: Lydia Obute

== Contestants ==
(ages stated are at start of contest)

Contestant	Age	Height	Home State	Finish	Place
Lisa Berghold	16	1.84 m (6 ft 1/2 in)	Graz	Episode 2	14 (quit)
Victoria Vogeler	26	1.75 m (5 ft 9 in)	Munich, Germany	Episode 2	13
Sarah Preiml	18	1.79 m (5 ft 10 1/2 in)	Sankt Veit an der Glan	Episode 3	12
Magalie Berghahn	21	1.79 m (5 ft 10 1/2 in)	Linz	Episode 4	11 (DQ)
Nadine Oberleiter	24	1.75 m (5 ft 9 in)	Feldkirch	Episode 5	10
Linda Linortner	25	1.73 m (5 ft 8 in)	Bad Ischl	Episode 5	9
Vanessa Lotz	24	1.78 m (5 ft 10 in)	Worms, Germany	Episode 6	8–7
Valerie Heidenreich	18	1.82 m (5 ft 11 1/2 in)	Vienna	Episode 6	8–7
Nicole Gerzabek	23	1.75 m (5 ft 9 in)	Vienna	Episode 8	6
Julia Trummer	20	1.80 m (5 ft 11 in)	Vienna	Episode 9	5
Darija Gavric	23	1.80 m (5 ft 11 in)	Travnik, Bosnia and Herzegovina	Episode 10	4
Romana Gruber	24	1.82 m (5 ft 11 1/2 in)	Schwaz	Episode 10	3
Katharina Theuermann	17	1.83 m (6 ft 0 in)	Klagenfurt	Episode 10	2
Lydia Obute	18	1.75 m (5 ft 9 in)	Baden bei Wien	Episode 10	1

== Summaries ==
Place	Model	Episodes											
Place	Model	1	2	3	4	5	6	7	8	9	10		
1	Lydia	SAFE	SAFE	SAFE	SAFE	SAFE	SAFE	SAFE	SAFE	SAFE	SAFE	SAFE	Winner
2	Katharina	SAFE	SAFE	SAFE	SAFE	SAFE	SAFE	SAFE	SAFE	LOW	SAFE	LOW	OUT
3	Romana	SAFE	SAFE	SAFE	SAFE	SAFE	SAFE	LOW	SAFE	LOW	LOW	OUT	
4	Darija	SAFE	SAFE	SAFE	SAFE	SAFE	SAFE	SAFE	LOW	SAFE	OUT		
5	Julia	SAFE	SAFE	SAFE	SAFE	SAFE	SAFE	LOW	LOW	OUT			
6	Nicole	SAFE	SAFE	SAFE	LOW	SAFE	SAFE	SAFE	OUT				
7–8	Valerie	SAFE	SAFE	LOW	SAFE	LOW	OUT						
7–8	Vanessa	SAFE	IMM	SAFE	SAFE	SAFE	OUT						
9	Linda	SAFE	SAFE	SAFE	LOW	OUT							
10	Nadine	SAFE	SAFE	SAFE	OUT								
11	Magalie	SAFE	SAFE	SAFE	DQ								
12	Sarah	SAFE	SAFE	OUT									
13	Victoria	SAFE	OUT										
14	Lisa	SAFE	QUIT										

The contestant quit the competition
The contestant was disqualified from the competition
The contestant was immune from elimination
The contestant was in danger of elimination
The contestant was eliminated
The contestant won the competition

=== Photo shoot guide ===
- Episode 2 photo shoot: Posing nude with two Philipp Plein accesoires
- Episode 3 photo shoot: Pointless action
- Episode 4 photo shoot: Champagne all over
- Episode 5 photo shoot: Jewel thieves
- Episode 6 photo shoot: Fierce sluts
- Episode 7 photo shoot: Being Romy Schneider
- Episode 8 photo shoot: Going editorial with falcons
- Episode 9 photo shoot: Woman magazine covers
- Episode 10 photo shoot: Flaming ice

== Judges ==
- Lena Gercke (Host)
- Elvyra Geyer
- Atil Kotuglu

== Magalie's racism controversy ==
In the fourth episode, contestant Magalie Berghahn was disqualified from the show for racist comments she made during a phone conversation with her boyfriend. She referred to a fellow competitor Lydia Obute as "Neger Oide" (negatively afflicted Austrian slang for Black Woman) and to Vanessa Lotz as "Deitsche" (slang for German Woman). Both Obute and Lotz won a go-see in that episode. The conversation was fully taped and aired during the show. Host Lena Gercke confronted her with the video material in front of the other two girls. Gercke then told her that she was expelled from the show, given the competition has no room for racist ideas and thoughts. As a result, Berghahn was not invited to the final runway show of the season's cast, and she later stated that the scandal ruined her life.

Plus 4 was later accused of using the controversy for promotional purposes as Berghahn's comments were already shown in the preview for the episode and uncensored during the airing of Episode 4.
