= Austria's Next Topmodel season 2 =

Austria's Next Topmodel
- Season 2
- No. of episodes: 11

Release
- Original network: PULS4
- Original release: 25 November 2009 – 10 February 2010

Season chronology
- ← Previous; Season 1 Next → Season 3

Austria's Next Topmodel, season 2 was the second season of the Austrian reality documentary based on Tyra Banks' America's Next Top Model. Once again Lena Gercke hosted the show while runway coach Alamande Belfor was replaced by former model and fashion photographer Andreas Ortner. Sabine Landl, who was the styling expert in season 1, also became a permanent member of the jury.

Like last year, the winner was represented by Wiener Models. Among the other prizes were a cover on Austrian magazine Woman, the face of the newest Hervis campaign as well as two runway jobs at the Milan and Paris Fashion Week.

== Contestants ==
(ages stated are at start of contest)

Contestant	Age	Hometown	Finish	Place
Julia Huber	24	St. Valentin	Episode 2	13
Lisa Schottak	16	Pubersdorf	Episode 3	12 (quit)
Angelika Czapka	23	Vienna	Episode 3	11
Manuela Frey	18	Dornbirn	Episode 5	10–9
Vanessa Hooper	19	Vienna	Episode 5	10–9
Iris Shala	19	Graz	Episode 7	8
Anna Steinwendner	16	Villach	Episode 8	7
Jennifer Kogler	16	Ferlach	Episode 9	6
Lina Köberl	16	Admont	Episode 10	5
Johanna Gruber	18	Vienna	Episode 11	4
Nina Kollmann	18	Niklasdorf	Episode 11	3
Sarah Unterberger	21	Kramsach	Episode 11	2
Aylin Kösetürk	16	Vienna	Episode 11	1

== Summaries ==
=== Call-out order ===
Lena's call-out order
Order	Episodes										
Order	1	2	3	5	7	8	9	10	11		
1	Iris	Jennifer	Nina	Aylin	Aylin	Jennifer	Johanna	Aylin	Nina	Aylin	Aylin
2	Lisa	Julia	Johanna	Nina	Lina	Lina	Nina	Johanna	Aylin	Sarah	Sarah
3	Sarah	Aylin	Sarah	Anna	Sarah	Aylin	Lina	Lina	Sarah	Nina	
4	Manuela	Nina	Jennifer	Manuela	Anna	Johanna	Jennifer	Sarah	Johanna		
5	Jennifer	Johanna	Aylin	Iris	Johanna	Sarah	Sarah	Nina			
6	Angelika	Sarah	Lina	Lina	Iris	Nina	Aylin				
7	Lina	Lisa	Anna	Johanna	Jennifer	Anna					
8	Nina	Iris	Iris	Sarah	Nina						
9	Julia	Vanessa	Vanessa	Jennifer							
10	Anna	Lina	Manuela	Vanessa							
11	Johanna	Anna	Angelika								
12	Vanessa	Angelika	Lisa								
13	Aylin	Manuela									

The contestant was eliminated
The contestant quit the competition.
The contestant won the competition

- Episode 4 ended with a cliffhanger and the entire elimination ceremony was shown the following episode.
- In episode 3, Lisa quit the competition.
- Episode 6 was a recap episode.

=== Photo shoot guide ===
- Episode 1 photo shoot: Jet set ladies (semifinal)
- Episode 2 photo shoot: Beach swimwear; posing with dolphins
- Episode 3 photo shoot: Maids in spooky castle
- Episode 4 photo shoot: Tiger Woods inspired tantrum
- Episode 7 photo shoot: London sightseeing
- Episode 8 photo shoot: Bungee jumping
- Episode 9 photo shoot: Color beauty shots
- Episode 10 photo shoot: Woman covers
- Episode 11 photo shoots: Philipp Plein campaign & modern geishas

== Judges ==
- Lena Gercke (Host)
- Andrea Weidler
- Sabine Landl
- Andreas Ortner
