= Austria's Next Topmodel season 4 =

Austria's Next Topmodel
- Season 4
- Judges: Lena Gercke; Elvyra Geyer; Atil Kutoglu
- No. of contestants: 16
- No. of episodes: 10

Release
- Original network: Puls 4
- Original release: January 12 – March 11, 2012

Season chronology
- ← Previous; Season 3 Next → Season 5

Season 4 of Austria's Next Topmodel aired on Puls 4 from January to March 2012.

Host Lena Gercke, Elvyra Geyer and Atil Kutoglu all returned as judges. The season premiered on 12 January 2012 and began with 21 semi-finalists, who were joined by Yemisi Rieger, who was chosen by Niki Lauda as a wildcard contestant at a separate casting. Sixteen contestants were chosen to advance to the main competition.

On 22 January 2012, during the airing of the season, a contestant, 21-year-old Sabrina Rauch, was killed in a car accident, three days after the airing of the episode she was eliminated in. The program paid tribute to her at the beginning of the following episode.

The winner of the competition was 16-year-old Antonia Hausmair, who represented Burgenland. As her prizes, she received a contract with Vienna-based modeling agency Wiener Models, a cover of Austrian Woman magazine and a position as the face of Kornmesser jewelry.

== Contestants ==
(ages stated are at start of contest)

| Contestant | Age | Hometown | Height | Finish | Place |
|---|---|---|---|---|---|
| Isabelle Raisa | 16 | Vienna | 1.70 m (5 ft 7 in) | Episode 1 | 16–15 |
| Alina Chlebecek | 18 | Deutsch-Wagram | 1.70 m (5 ft 7 in) | Episode 1 | 16–15 |
| Sabrina Rauch † | 21 | Graz | 1.75 m (5 ft 9 in) | Episode 2 | 14–13 |
| Katharina Mihalovic | 23 | Vienna | 1.79 m (5 ft 10 1/2 in) | Episode 2 | 14–13 |
| Nataša Maric | 16 | Salzburg | 1.75 m (5 ft 9 in) | Episode 3 | 12 |
| Michaela Schopf | 21 | Salzburg | 1.72 m (5 ft 7 1/2 in) | Episode 4 | 11 (quit) |
| Christine Riener | 19 | Bludenz | 1.81 m (5 ft 11 1/2 in) | Episode 4 | 10 |
| Teodora-Madalina 'Madalina' Andreica | 17 | Graz | 1.77 m (5 ft 9 1/2 in) | Episode 6 | 9 |
| Yemisi Rieger | 17 | Vienna | 1.77 m (5 ft 9 1/2 in) | Episode 7 | 8 |
| Izabela Pop Kostic | 20 | Vienna | 1.70 m (5 ft 7 in) | Episode 8 | 7 |
| Nadine Trinker | 21 | Bodensdorf | 1.83 m (6 ft 0 in) | Episode 9 | 6–5 |
| Bianca Ebelsberger | 24 | Aurach am Hongar | 1.79 m (5 ft 10 1/2 in) | Episode 9 | 6–5 |
| Dzejlana 'Lana' Baltic | 20 | Graz | 1.79 m (5 ft 10 1/2 in) | Episode 10 | 4 |
| Melisa Popanicic | 16 | Schwaz | 1.75 m (5 ft 9 in) | Episode 10 | 3 |
| Gina Adamu | 17 | Bad Vöslau | 1.75 m (5 ft 9 in) | Episode 10 | 2 |
| Antonia Hausmair | 16 | Siegendorf | 1.75 m (5 ft 9 in) | Episode 10 | 1 |

== Episodes ==
=== Episode 1 ===
Original airdate: January 12, 2012

- Challenge winner: Lana Baltic
- Eliminated: Isabelle Raisa & Alina Chlebecek

=== Episode 2 ===
Original airdate: January 19, 2012

- Challenge winner/Booked for job: Antonia Hausmair
- Best photo: Michaela Schopf
- Bottom two/eliminated: Sabrina Rauch & Katharina Mihalovic

=== Episode 3 ===
Original airdate: January 26, 2012

- Booked for job: None
- Challenge winner/Best photo: Izabela Pop Kostic
- Eliminated: Nataša Maric

=== Episode 4 ===
Original airdate: February 2, 2012

- Quit: Michaela Schopf
- Booked for job: all girls
- Challenge winner/best photo: Izabela Pop Kostic
- Bottom three: Bianca Ebelsberger, Christine Riener & Lana Baltic
- Eliminated: Christine Riener

=== Episode 5 ===
Original airdate: February 9, 2012

- Challenge winner: Bianca Ebelsberger
- Booked for job: Nadine Trinker
- Best photo: Gina Adamu
- Bottom two: Lana Baltic & Yemisi Rieger
- Eliminated: None

=== Episode 6 ===
Original airdate: February 12, 2012

- Challenge winner: Antonia Hausmair
- Booked for job: Bianca Ebelsberger
- Best photo: Gina Adamu
- Eliminated: Madalina Andreica
- Bottom two: Antonia Hausmair & Bianca Ebelsberger
- Eliminated: See below

=== Episode 7 ===
Original airdate: February 19, 2012

- Eliminated (episode 6): None
- Challenge winner: Melisa Popanicic
- Booked for job: Lana Baltic & Melisa Popanicic
- Best photo: Lana Baltic
- Eliminated: Yemisi Rieger

=== Episode 8 ===
Original airdate: February 26, 2012

- Challenge winner: Nadine Trinker
- Booked for job: Antonia Hausmair & Lana Baltic
- Best photo: Lana Baltic
- Eliminated: Izabela Pop Kostic
- Bottom two: Bianca Ebelsberger & Melisa Popanicic
- Eliminated: None

=== Episode 9 ===
Original airdate: March 4, 2012

- Challenge winner: Bianca Ebelsberger
- Booked for job: Antonia Hausmair & Gina Adamu
- Eliminated: Bianca Ebelsberger
- Bottom two: Melisa Popanicic & Nadine Trinker
- Eliminated: Nadine Trinker

=== Finale ===
Original airdate: March 11, 2012

- Final four: Antonia Hausmair, Gina Adamu, Lana Baltic & Melisa Popanicic
- First eliminated: Lana Baltic
- Final three: Antonia Hausmair, Gina Adamu & Melisa Popanicic
- Second eliminated: Melisa Popanicic
- Final two: Antonia Hausmair & Gina Adamu
- Austria's Next Topmodel: Antonia Hausmair

== Summaries ==
=== Results table ===
| Place | Episodes | | | | | | | | | | | | |
| Place | 1 | | 2 | 3 | 4 | 5 | 6 | 7 | 8 | 9 | 10 | | |
|---|---|---|---|---|---|---|---|---|---|---|---|---|---|
| 1 | Lana | Izabela | Bianca | Christine | Izabela | Gina | Gina | Melisa | Lana | Antonia | Antonia | Gina | Antonia |
| 2 | Bianca | Katharina | Michaela | Melisa | Melisa | Nadine | Izabela | Izabela | Antonia | Lana | Melisa | Antonia | Gina |
| 3 | Gina | Yemisi | Antonia | Antonia | Gina | Bianca | Melisa | Nadine | Nadine | Gina | Gina | Melisa | |
| 4 | Katharina | Isabelle | Yemisi | Gina | Antonia | Izabela | Lana | Gina | Gina | Bianca | Lana | | |
| 5 | Nadine | Antonia | Izabela | Michaela | Madalina | Antonia | Yemisi | Lana | Izabela | Melisa | | | |
| 6 | Melisa | Bianca | Madalina | Izabela | Yemisi | Madalina | Nadine | Antonia | Bianca | Nadine | | | |
| 7 | Nataša | Melisa | Gina | Nadine | Nadine | Melisa | Madalina | Bianca | Melisa | | | | |
| 8 | Bianca | Nadine | Melisa | Nataša | Lana | Lana | Bianca | Yemisi | | | | | |
| 9 | Sabrina | Christine | Nadine | Madalina | Bianca | Yemisi | Antonia | | | | | | |
| 10 | Christine | Lana | Lana | Yemisi | Christine | | | | | | | | |
| 11 | Yemisi | Madalina | Nataša | Bianca | Michaela | | | | | | | | |
| 12 | Madalina | Sabrina | Christine | Lana | | | | | | | | | |
| 13 | Michaela | Nataša | Katharina; Sabrina | | | | | | | | | | |
| 14 | Isabelle | Michaela | Katharina; Sabrina | | | | | | | | | | |
| 15 | Alina | Gina | | | | | | | | | | | |
| 16 | Izabela | Alina | | | | | | | | | | | |

The contestant won best photo
The contestant quit the competition
The contestant was immune from elimination
The contestant was in danger of elimination
The contestant was eliminated
The contestant won the competition

=== Photo shoot guide ===
- Episode 1 photo shoot: B&W beauty shots and body shots
- Episode 2 photo shoot: Posing topless with Dior handbags
- Episode 3 photo shoot: Roberto Cavalli dresses with fire
- Episode 4 photo shoot: Nude shoot with a water hose
- Episode 5 photo shoot: Crying beauty shots
- Episode 6 photo shoot: Romantic lesbians in pairs
- Episode 7 photo shoot: Looking busted AF with Zhu Zhu Pet purses
- Episode 8 photo shoot: Sensual underwear with a male model
- Episode 9 photo shoot: Woman magazine covers
- Episode 10 photo shoot: Posing with a snake on silk fabric
