= Omorodion =

Omorodion is a Nigerian surname.

- Samu Omorodion, a name ofted used for Samu Aghehowa, Nigerian footballer
- Lisa Omorodion, Nigerian actress
- Isak Omorodion, winner of Austria's Next Topmodel season 8
