= Gabriele Strehle =

German fashion designer

- Born: March 11, 1951 (age 75)
- Occupation: Fashion designer
- Known for: Creative director of Strenesse

Gabriele Strehle (born 11 March 1951) is a German fashion designer best known for shaping the label Strenesse over several decades. She joined the family company in 1973, became head designer, and led the wear collections until the end of 2012. Under her direction, Strenesse showed on international runways in Milan and later at New York Fashion Week, and the brand took on high-profile commissions, including new uniforms for Lufthansa and formal wear for Germany national football team off the pitch.

== Early life and education ==
Strehle grew up in the Allgäu region of Southern Germany. She trained as a bespoke tailor and later earned a diploma from the Deutsche Meisterschule für Mode.

== Career ==
Strehle entered the Strehle family firm in 1973.

The brand gained visibility through runway shows in Milan and New York Fashion Week. Outside the shows, Strehle led projects such as the refresh of Lufthansa uniforms and off-field suiting for the Germany men's national team.

== Awards and honours ==
- Federal Cross of Merit - (1998)
- Bambi Award - (2002)
