= Annika Hansen =

Annika Hansen may refer to:

- Seven of Nine, fictional character born Annika Hansen, in Star Trek: Voyager
- Annica Hansen (born Annika Hansen, 1982), German presenter and model
