= Lydia Obute =

Austrian model

- Born: Lydia Nnenna Obute; 1993 (age 32–33); Baden, Austria
- Modeling information
- Height: 1.75 m (5 ft 9 in)
- Hair color: Black
- Eye color: Brown
- Agency: Wiener Models

Lydia Nnenna Obute is an Austrian model, best known for being the winner of the Cycle three of Austria's Next Topmodel.

== Early life ==
Obute was born in Lower Austria to Nigerian parents. Prior to her participation on AtNTM, she had some experience as a model walking for fashion designer Thang De Hoo.

== Austria's Next Topmodel ==
Being chosen among 4,500 hopefuls to be among the top 36, Obute qualified for the show among the top 4 from the Vienna auditions for the round of the final 14. She was involved in a controversy when fellow contestant Magalie Berghahn referred to her as "Neger Oide" (derogatory Austrian slang equivalent to "negro chick") in Episode 3 while having a phone conversation with her boyfriend that was taped and aired on television. Obute was confronted with that scene which was followed by a disqualification of Berghahn from the show. After being a favourite for the title, Obute won several castings during the show most namely a testimonial for Evian.
On 28 February 2011 she won the competition over Katharina Theuermann, the youngest contestant on the competition. She won the cover of Woman as well as a testimonial for a Hervis Sports campaign and two runway jobs in Milan and Paris.

| Preceded by Aylin Kösetürk | Austria's Next Topmodel winner Cycle 3 (2011) | Succeeded by Antonia Hausmair |
