= Austria's Next Topmodel season 1 =

Season of television series

Austria's Next Topmodel
- Season 1
- No. of episodes: 7

Release
- Original network: PULS4
- Original release: 8 January – 9 February 2009

Season chronology
- Next → Season 2

Austria's Next Topmodel, season 1 was the first season of the Austrian reality documentary based on Tyra Banks America's Next Top Model.
The host of the show was Lena Gercke, the first winner of GNTM who is also the first winner of a Top Model franchise that later becomes a host of another Top Model show. The jury consisted of the head of Vienna-based agency Wiener Models Andrea Weidler and Dutch-born runway coach Alamande Belfor.

The show caused some controversy, as it was discovered that Tamara Puljarevic, one of the contestants, applied under her father's surname to hide her identity of being the daughter of Svetlana Puljarevic, who is the executive chief of Miss magazine, on whose cover the winner would eventually be featured. She eventually made it to the 2nd runner-up-position but was ultimately surpassed by 16-year-old Larissa Marolt, who was named the first Austria's Next Topmodel and went on to compete on the fourth season of Germany's Next Topmodel hosted by Heidi Klum.

== Contestants ==
(ages stated are at start of contest)

Contestant	Age	Height	Hometown	Finish	Place
Piroschka Khyo	16	1.78 m (5 ft 10 in)	Wiener Neustadt	Episode 2	10
Birgit Königstorfer	22	1.73 m (5 ft 8 in)	Linz	Episode 3	9
Kordula Stöckl	21	1.77 m (5 ft 9 1/2 in)	Navis	Episode 4	8–7
Christiane Pliem	17	1.73 m (5 ft 8 in)	Bad Mitterndorf	Episode 4	8–7
Julia Mähder	20	1.77 m (5 ft 9 1/2 in)	Vienna	Episode 5	6
Kim Sade-Tiroch	17	1.80 m (5 ft 11 in)	Baden bei Wien	Episode 6	5
Constanzia Delort-Laval	16	1.73 m (5 ft 8 in)	Vienna	Episode 7	4
Tamara Puljarevic	18	1.73 m (5 ft 8 in)	Vienna	Episode 7	3
Victoria Hooper	16	1.74 m (5 ft 8 1/2 in)	Vienna	Episode 7	2
Larissa Marolt	16	1.75 m (5 ft 9 in)	Sankt Kanzian am Klopeiner See	Episode 7	1

== Episodes ==
=== I am from Austria ===
Title translation: "I am from Austria"
Original airdate: January 9, 2009

- Guest judges: Sabine Landl & Thang de Hoo

=== Küss die Hand, schöne Frau ===
Title translation: "Kiss the hand, beautiful lady"
Original airdate: January 15, 2009

- Challenge winners: Larissa Marolt & Victoria Hooper
- Bottom two: Birgit Königstorfer & Piroschka Khyo
- Eliminated: Piroschka Khyo
- Featured photographer: Sepp Gallauer
- Guest judges: Sabine Landl & Sepp Gallauer

=== Es lebe der Sport ===
Title translation: "Long lives the sport"
Original airdate: January 22, 2009

- Challenge winner: Constanzia Delort-Laval
- Casting winner: Julia Mähder
- Featured photographer: Gery Keszler & Andreas Bitesnich
- Guest judge: Stefan Maierhofer

=== Out of the dark ===
Title translation: "Out of the dark"
Original airdate: January 26, 2009

- Bottom two: Birgit Königstorfer & Kim Sade-Tiroch
- Eliminated: Birgit Königstorfer
- Bottom three: Christiane Pliem, Constanzia Delort-Laval & Kordula Stöckl
- Eliminated: Christiane Pliem & Kordula Stöckl
- Challenge winners: Constanzia Delort-Laval, Kordula Stöckl, Tamara Puljarevic & Victoria Hooper
- Guest judge: Domenique Melchior

=== Schickeria ===
Original airdate: January 29, 2009

- Bottom two: Julia Mähder & Tamara Puljarevic
- Eliminated: Julia Mähder
- Challenge winner: Constaniza Delort-Laval & Julia Mähder
- Guest judge: Eva Dichand & Gery Keszler

=== Engel fliegen einsam ===
Title translation: "Angels fly alone"
Original airdate: February 2, 2009

- Bottom three: Constanzia Delort-Laval, Kim Sade-Tiroch & Larissa Marolt
- Eliminated: Kim Sade-Tiroch
- Challenge winner: Larissa Marolt
- Featured photographers: Mato Johannik & Mike Asato
- Guest judge: Julia Wagner

=== Dies Bildnis ist bezaubernd schön ===
Title translation: "This portrait is enchantingly beautiful"
Original airdate: February 5, 2009

- Bottom two: Constanzia Delort-Laval & Tamara Puljarevic
- Eliminated: Constanzia Delort-Laval
- Bottom two: Larissa Marolt & Tamara Puljarevic
- Eliminated: Tamara Puljarevic
- Final two: Larissa Marolt & Victoria Hooper
- Austria's Next Topmodel: Larissa Marolt
- Featured photographer: Rafaela Pröll
- Guest judge: Atil Kutoglu

== Summaries ==
=== Call-out order ===
Order	Episodes								
Order	1	2	3	4	5	6	7		
1	Kim	Victoria	Tamara	Kim	Victoria	Victoria	Larissa	Victoria	Larissa
2	Constanzia	Larissa	Larissa	Larissa	Larissa	Tamara	Victoria	Larissa	Victoria
3	Tamara	Kordula	Christiane	Julia	Kim	Larissa	Tamara	Tamara	
4	Victoria	Tamara	Victoria	Victoria	Constanzia	Constanzia	Constanzia		
5	Julia	Julia	Kordula	Tamara	Tamara	Kim			
6	Larissa	Kim	Julia	Constanzia	Julia				
7	Birgit	Christiane	Constanzia	Christiane					
8	Kordula	Constanzia	Kim	Kordula					
9	Piroschka	Birgit	Birgit						
10	Christiane	Piroschka							

The contestant won the reward challenge and was immune from elimination
The contestant was eliminated
The contestant won the competition

- Episodes 3 and 5 ended with a cliffhanger and the elimination was shown in the following episode

=== Bottom two / three ===
Episode	Contestants			Eliminated
2	Birgit	&	Piroschka	Piroschka
3	Birgit	&	Kim	Birgit
4	Constanzia	Cristiane	Kordula	Christiane
4	Constanzia	Cristiane	Kordula	Kordula
5	Julia	&	Tamara	Julia
6	Constanzia	Kim	Larissa	Kim
7	Constanzia	&	Tamara	Constanzia
7	Larissa	&	Tamara	Tamara
7	Larissa	&	Victoria	Victoria

The contestant was eliminated after their first time in the bottom two
The contestant was eliminated after their second time in the bottom two
The contestant was eliminated after their third time in the bottom two
The contestant was eliminated and placed as the runner-up

=== Photo shoot guide ===
- Episode 1 photo shoot: Cobenzl runway
- Episode 2 photo shoot: Casual attire
- Episode 3 photo shoot: Life Ball's style bible; skiing snow queens
- Episode 4 photo shoot: Body painting
- Episode 5 photo shoot: Chrystal worlds calendar
- Episode 6 photo shoots: Miss covers; made in Austria
- Episode 7 photo shoots: Swarovski campaign; tradition trifft moderne

== Judges ==
- Lena Gercke (Host)
- Andrea Weidler
- Alamande Belfor
