= Aylin Kösetürk =

Austrian model

- Born: Aylin Kösetürk; 5 August 1993 (age 33); Vienna, Austria
- Modeling information
- Height: 1.73 m (5 ft 8 in)
- Hair color: Dark Brown
- Eye color: Brown
- Agency: Wiener Models

Aylin Kösetürk (born 5 August 1993) is an Austrian fashion model of Turkish descent. Kösetürk is best known for being the winner of the second season of Austria's Next Topmodel, which was held in 2009. After that she had to continue her work as a waitress.

== See also ==
- Austria's Next Topmodel, Cycle 2

Preceded by Larissa Marolt	Austria's Next Topmodel winner Cycle 2 (2009-10)	Succeeded by Lydia Nnenna Obute
