= Austria's Next Topmodel season 7 =

Austria's Next Topmodel
- Season 7
- No. of episodes: 19

Release
- Original network: PULS4
- Original release: September 15, 2015 – January 19, 2016

Season chronology
- ← Previous; Season 6 Next → Season 8

Austria's Next Topmodel, season 7, (stylized as Austria's Next Topmodel boysןɹıƃ) was the seventh season of the Austrian reality television show in which a number of men and women compete for the title of Austria's Next Topmodel and a chance to start their career in the modelling industry. The winner, depending on gender, will also be given the chance to appear on the cover of the Austrian edition of either Men's Health or Women's Health magazine. The social media scoring system was still implemented this season. The season began to air on September 15, 2015.

The winner of the competition was 19-year-old Fabian Herzgsell from Salzburg. As his prizes, he received a contract with Vienna-based modeling agency Wiener Models, a cover of Men's Health magazine, a position as the face of Tezenis underwear and a Ford Fiesta.

== Contestants ==
Contestant	Age	Height	Home City	Finish	Place
Johannes Spilka	19	1.88 m (6 ft 2 in)	Vienna	Episode 1	20
Felix Schiller	19	1.86 m (6 ft 1 in)	Vienna	Episode 2	19
Lukas Krammer	20	1.86 m (6 ft 1 in)	Klagenfurt	Episode 3	18 (quit)
Jelena Vujcic	17	1.77 m (5 ft 9 1/2 in)	Vienna	Episode 3	17
Alexandra Kröpfl	23	1.71 m (5 ft 7 1/2 in)	Hartberg	Episode 4	16
Benedikt Cekolj	18	1.85 m (6 ft 1 in)	Vienna	Episode 5	15
Adrian Oshioke	17	1.87 m (6 ft 1 1/2 in)	Vienna	Episode 7	14
Bianca Konarzewski	20	1.72 m (5 ft 7 1/2 in)	Klagenfurt	Episode 7	13
Junel Anderson	25	1.78 m (5 ft 10 in)	Innsbruck	Episode 8	12
Nicole Fried	16	1.73 m (5 ft 8 in)	Sankt Pölten	Episode 10	11
Katja Peterka	19	1.74 m (5 ft 8 1/2 in)	Vienna	Episode 12	10
Patrick Treffer	21	1.85 m (6 ft 1 in)	Villach	Episode 14	9
Maximilliano Mantovani	20	1.88 m (6 ft 2 in)	Linz	Episode 15	8 (quit)
Bernhard Stich	19	1.88 m (6 ft 2 in)	Korneuburg	Episode 16	7
Melisa Sretkovic	24	1.74 m (5 ft 8 1/2 in)	Dornbirn	Episode 18	6
Tassilo Herberstein	20	1.92 m (6 ft 3 1/2 in)	Vienna	Episode 18	5
Gloria Burtscher	19	1.76 m (5 ft 9 1/2 in)	Vienna	Episode 19	4
Mia Sabathy	21	1.78 m (5 ft 10 in)	Vienna	Episode 19	3
Angelina Stolz	21	1.83 m (6 ft 0 in)	Völs	Episode 19	2
Fabian Herzgsell	18	1.86 m (6 ft 1 in)	Salzburg	Episode 19	1

== Episodes ==
=== Episode 1 ===
Original airdate: September 15, 2015

Sissi & Franz pairs
Adrian & Gloria
Alexandra & Fabian
Angelina & Felix
Benedikt & Melisa
Bernhard & Katja
Bianca & Lukas
Jelena & Patrick
Johannes & Nicole
Junel & Maximilliano
Mia & Tassilo

- Granted immunity by the public: Maximilliano Mantovani
- Nominated for elimination by the public: Melisa Sretkovic
- Nominated for elimination by the judges: Felix Schiller, Johannes Spilka & Katja Peterka
- Eliminated: Johannes Spilka

=== Episode 2 ===
Original Airdate: September 22, 2015

- Immune from elimination: Katja Peterka
- Granted immunity by the public: Lukas Krammer
- Nominated for elimination by the public: Melisa Sretkovic
- Nominated for elimination by the judges: Bernhard Stich, Felix Schiller & Nicole Fried
- Eliminated: Felix Schiller

=== Episode 3 ===
Original Airdate: September 29, 2015

Boat couples
Adrian & Junel
Alexandra & Lukas
Angelina & Patrick
Benedikt & Mia
Bernhard & Nicole
Bianca & Tassilo
Fabian & Katja
Gloria & Jelena
Maximilliano & Melisa

- Challenge winner: Gloria Burtscher
- Booked for casting: Angelina Stolz, Bernhard Stich, Fabian Herzgsell, Gloria Burtscher, Katja Peterka & Patrick Treffer
- Immune from elimination: Bernhard Stich
- Granted immunity by the public: Lukas Krammer
- Quit: Lukas Krammer
- Nominated for elimination by the public: Jelena Vujcic
- Nominated for elimination by the judges: Benedikt Cekolj, Junel Anderson & Maximilliano Mantovani
- Eliminated: Jelena Vujcic

=== Episode 4 ===
Original Airdate: October 6, 2015

- Booked for job: Adrian Oshioke & Tassilo Herberstein
- Immune from elimination: Bernhard Stich
- Granted immunity by the public: Fabian Herzgsell
- Nominated for elimination by the public: Junel Anderson
- Nominated for elimination by the judges: Alexandra Kröpfl, Bianca Konarzewski & Nicole Fried
- Eliminated: Alexandra Kröpfl

=== Episode 5 ===
Original Airdate: October 13, 2015

- Booked for campaign: Adrian Oshioke, Bianca Konarzewski & Katja Peterka
- Challenge winner: Mia Sabathy
- Granted immunity by the public: Adrian Oshioke
- Nominated for elimination by the public: Mia Sabathy
- Nominated for elimination by the judges: Benedikt Cekolj, Junel Anderson & Maximilliano Mantovani
- Eliminated: Benedikt Cekolj

=== Episode 6 ===
Original Airdate: October 20, 2015

- Granted immunity by the public: Melisa Sretkovic
- Nominated for elimination by the contestants: Nicole Fried
- Nominated for elimination by the judges: Adrian Oshioke, Bernhard Stich & Junel Anderson
- Eliminated: None

=== Episode 7 ===
Original Airdate: October 27, 2015

- Eliminated outside of judging panel: Adrian Oshioke
- Challenge winner: Junel Anderson
- Granted immunity by the public: Nicole Fried
- Nominated for elimination by the public: Angelina Stolz
- Nominated for elimination by the judges: Bernhard Stich, Bianca Konarzewski & Maximilliano Mantovani
- Eliminated: Bernhard Stich & Bianca Konarzewski

=== Episode 8 ===
Original Airdate: November 3, 2015

- Challenge winner: Mia Sabathy
- Immune from elimination: Gloria Burtscher
- Granted immunity by the public: Fabian Herzgsell
- Nominated for elimination by the public: Melisa Sretkovic
- Nominated for elimination by the judges: Junel Anderson, Nicole Fried & Patrick Treffer
- Eliminated: Junel Anderson

=== Episode 9 ===
Original Airdate: November 10, 2015

- Challenge winner: Fabian Herzgsell
- Booked for job: Angelina Stolz
- Immune from elimination: Angelina Stolz
- Granted immunity by the public: Katja Peterka
- Eliminated: None

=== Episode 10 ===
Original Airdate: November 17, 2015

- Challenge winner: Maximilliano Mantovani
- Booked for job: Fabian Herzgsell, Katja Peterka, Melisa Sretkovic & Patrick Treffer
- Eliminated: Nicole Fried
- Returned: Bernhard Stich

=== Episode 11 ===
Original Airdate: November 24, 2015

- Challenge winner: Bernhard Stich
- Booked for castings: Angelina Stolz, Fabian Herzgsell & Katja Peterka
- Granted immunity by the public: Patrick Treffer
- Nominated for elimination by the public: Gloria Burtscher
- Nominated for elimination by the judges: Katja Peterka, Maximilliano Mantovani & Melisa Sretkovic
- Eliminated: Maximilliano Mantovani

=== Episode 12 ===
Original Airdate: December 1, 2015

- Challenge winner: Bernhard Stich & Mia Sabathy
- Booked for job: Angelina Stolz, Mia Sabathy & Tassilo Herberstein
- Nominated for elimination by the judges: Angelina Stolz, Fabian Herzgsell, Katja Peterka, Melisa Sretkovic & Tassilo Herberstein
- Eliminated: Katja Peterka

=== Episode 13 ===
Original Airdate: December 8, 2015

- Challenge winner: Melisa Sretkovic
- Booked for job: Angelina Stolz, Fabian Herzgsell & Mia Sabathy
- Granted immunity by the public: Patrick Treffer
- Nominated for elimination by the public: Gloria Burtscher
- Nominated for elimination by the judges: Bernhard Stich, Melisa Sretkovic & Tassilo Herberstein
- Eliminated: Tassilo Herberstein
- Returned: Maximilliano Mantovani

=== Episode 14 ===
Original Airdate: December 15, 2015

- Challenge winner: Patrick Treffer
- Booked for job: Angelina Stolz, Fabian Herzgsell, Maximilliano Mantovani & Melisa Sretkovic
- Eliminated: Patrick Treffer

=== Episode 15 ===
Original Airdate: December 22, 2015

- Quit: Maximilliano Mantovani
- Returned: Tassilo Herberstein
- Challenge winner: Angelina Stolz
- Booked for job: Angelina Stolz, Mia Sabathy & Tassilo Herberstein
- Immune: Mia Sabathy
- Bottom two: Bernhard Stich & Gloria Burtscher
- Eliminated: None
- Special guest: Sami Slimani

=== Episode 16 ===
Original Airdate: December 29, 2015

- Challenge winner: None
- Booked for job: Angelina Stolz, Bernhard Stich, Fabian Herzgsell, Gloria Burtscher, Melisa Sretkovic, Mia Sabathy & Tassilo Herberstein
- Bottom three: Bernhard Stich, Fabian Herzgsell & Melisa Sretkovic
- Eliminated: Bernhard Stich

=== Episode 17 ===
Original Airdate: January 5, 2016

- Challenge winner: Fabian Herzgsell
- Booked for job: Angelina Stolz, Gloria Burtscher & Melisa Sretkovic
- Bottom three: Angelina Stolz, Melisa Sretkovic & Tassilo Herberstein
- Eliminated: None

=== Episode 18 ===
Original Airdate: January 12, 2016

- Challenge winner: Fabian Herzgsell
- Booked for job: Gloria Burtscher
- Eliminated outside of judging panel: Melisa Sretkovic
- Immune from elimination: Mia Sabathy
- Bottom two: Gloria Burtscher & Tassilo Herberstein
- Eliminated: Tassilo Herberstein

=== Episode 19 ===
Original Airdate: January 19, 2016

- Final four: Angelina Stolz, Fabian Herzgsell, Gloria Burtscher & Mia Sabathy
- Eliminated: Gloria Burtscher
- Final three: Angelina Stolz, Fabian Herzgsell & Mia Sabathy
- Eliminated: Mia Sabathy
- Final two: Angelina Stolz & Fabian Herzgsell
- Austria's Next Topmodel: Fabian Herzgsell

== Summaries ==
Place	Model	Episodes																				
Place	Model	1	2	3	4	5	6	7	8	9	10	11	12	13	14	15	16	17	18	19		
1	Fabian	SAFE	SAFE	SAFE	IMM	SAFE	SAFE	SAFE	IMM	SAFE	SAFE	SAFE	LOW	SAFE	SAFE	SAFE	LOW	SAFE	SAFE	SAFE	SAFE	Winner
2	Angelina	SAFE	SAFE	SAFE	SAFE	SAFE	SAFE	LOW	SAFE	IMM	SAFE	SAFE	LOW	SAFE	SAFE	SAFE	SAFE	LOW	SAFE	SAFE	LOW	OUT
3	Mia	SAFE	SAFE	SAFE	SAFE	LOW	SAFE	SAFE	SAFE	SAFE	SAFE	SAFE	SAFE	SAFE	SAFE	IMM	SAFE	SAFE	IMM	SAFE	OUT	
4	Gloria	SAFE	SAFE	SAFE	SAFE	SAFE	SAFE	SAFE	IMM	SAFE	SAFE	LOW	SAFE	LOW	LOW	LOW	SAFE	SAFE	LOW	OUT		
5	Tassilo	SAFE	SAFE	SAFE	SAFE	SAFE	SAFE	SAFE	SAFE	SAFE	SAFE	SAFE	LOW	OUT		SAFE	SAFE	LOW	OUT			
6	Melisa	LOW	LOW	SAFE	SAFE	SAFE	IMM	SAFE	LOW	SAFE	SAFE	LOW	LOW	LOW	SAFE	SAFE	LOW	LOW	OUT			
7	Bernhard	SAFE	LOW	IMM	IMM	SAFE	LOW	OUT				SAFE	SAFE	LOW	LOW	LOW	OUT					
8	Maximilliano	IMM	SAFE	LOW	SAFE	LOW	SAFE	LOW	SAFE	SAFE	SAFE	OUT			SAFE	QUIT						
9	Patrick	SAFE	SAFE	SAFE	SAFE	SAFE	SAFE	SAFE	LOW	SAFE	SAFE	IMM	SAFE	IMM	OUT							
10	Katja	LOW	IMM	SAFE	SAFE	SAFE	SAFE	SAFE	SAFE	IMM	SAFE	LOW	OUT									
11	Nicole	SAFE	LOW	SAFE	LOW	SAFE	LOW	IMM	LOW	LOW	OUT											
12	Junel	SAFE	SAFE	LOW	LOW	LOW	LOW	LOW	OUT													
13	Bianca	SAFE	SAFE	SAFE	LOW	SAFE	SAFE	OUT														
14	Adrian	SAFE	SAFE	SAFE	SAFE	IMM	LOW	OUT														
15	Benedikt	SAFE	SAFE	LOW	LOW	OUT																
16	Alexandra	SAFE	SAFE	SAFE	OUT																	
17	Jelena	SAFE	SAFE	OUT																		
18	Lukas	SAFE	IMM	QUIT																		
19	Felix	LOW	OUT																			
20	Johannes	OUT																				

The contestant was eliminated outside of judging panel
The contestant quit the competition
The contestant was immune from elimination
The contestant was in danger of elimination
The contestant was eliminated
The contestant won the competition

=== Photo shoot guide ===
- Episode 1 photo shoot: Empress Elisabeth & Franz Joseph I portraits
- Episode 2 photo shoot: Posing with horses in B&W
- Episode 3 photo shoot: Couples on a boat
- Episode 4 photo shoot: Topless with babies in B&W
- Episode 5 photo shoot: Action jump inside a hangar
- Episode 6 photo shoot: Traditional wear in Marrakesh with snakes
- Episode 7 photo shoot: Oriental beauty in a pool
- Episode 8 photo shoot: Kaftans and turbans in the desert
- Episode 9 photo shoot: James Bond action on a train
- Episode 10 photo shoot: Posing on barrels of wine
- Episode 11 photo shoot: Androgyny
- Episode 12 photo shoot: Fire runway show
- Episode 13 photo shoot: Romeo & Juliet
- Episode 14 photo shoot: Men's Health & Women's Health magazine covers
- Episode 16 photo shoots: Dancing lions; Stylesfeed; Bamboo editorial; Esquire magazine; Jessica magazine
- Episode 18 photo shoot: Posing in giant bowls of soup
- Episode 19 photo shoot: Masquerade couture full body & beauty shots

== Judges ==
- Melanie Scheriau (Host)
- Papis Loveday
- Michael Urban
