= Larissa Marolt =

Austrian fashion model and actress (born 1992)

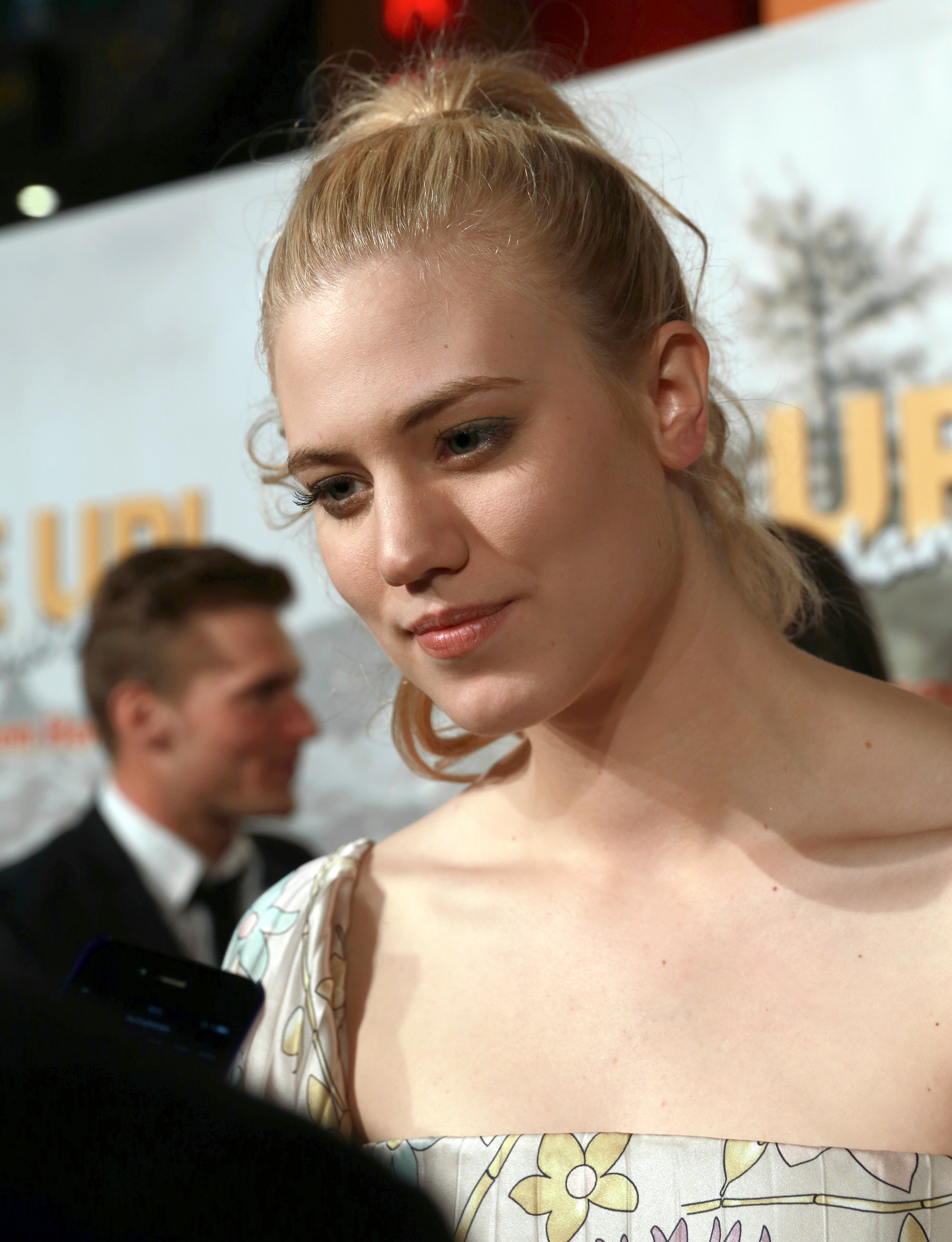
- Marolt in 2014
- Born: Larissa-Antonia Marolt; 10 July 1992 (age 34); Klagenfurt, Austria
- Occupations: Model, actress
- Years active: 2008–present
- Modeling information
- Height: 1.77 m (5 ft 9 1/2 in)
- Hair color: Blonde
- Eye color: Blue / Green
- Website: www.maroltlarissa.at

Larissa-Antonia Marolt (born 10 July 1992 in Klagenfurt) is an Austrian fashion model and actress. She was the winner of the first cycle of Austria's Next Topmodel. After her victory she also participated in the fourth season of Germany's Next Top Model, where she was placed eighth.

== Early life ==
Marolt was raised in the Carinthian town of St. Kanzian, where her father, Heinz Anton Marolt, a former member of the Austrian Freedom Party and retired local politician, owns a hotel. She has three siblings (two brothers and one older sister). Marolt attended a Gymnasium and passed her A-Levels in 2010.

As a 14 year old, she was active in the youth theater club of the Klagenfurt City Theater, where she was discovered as a model.

== Career ==
At the age of 16, Marolt auditioned for Austria's Next Top Model, where she was chosen as one of the ten girls to appear on the TV show. In the last episode she was declared winner of the title "Austria's Next Topmodel". The prize included a contract with the modelling agency Wiener Models, an appearance on the cover of the Austrian magazine Miss in February 2008, a contract as the face of the next advertising campaign for Swarovski Crystallized and a participation in Germany's Next Topmodel by Heidi Klum, making her the second (After Andrea Akmazdic from Croatia and Bosnia) contestant worldwide to appear on two different Top Model shows.

Despite being a former winner and the audience's favourite, Marolt failed to garner the sympathy of her fellow contestants, which resulted in her isolation from the group. After her participation in the two shows, she walked the runway in the Amber Fashion Show and the Vienna Life Ball in 2009. She also landed the covers of several Austrian magazines such as Madonna or Live.

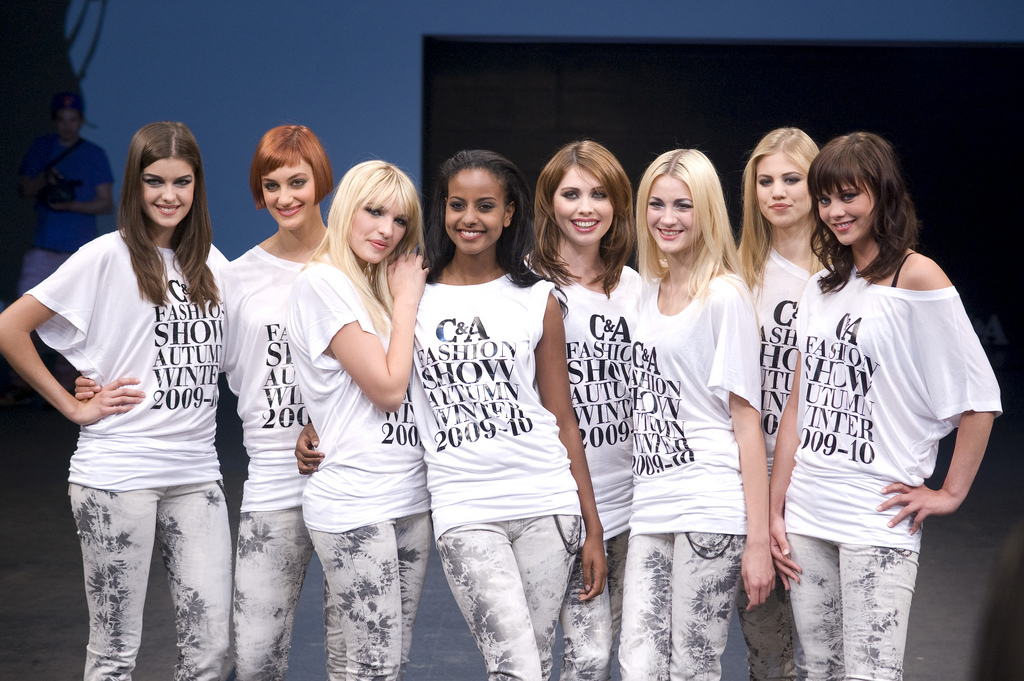
Marolt (second from the right) with the other finalists of Germany's Next Topmodel 2009

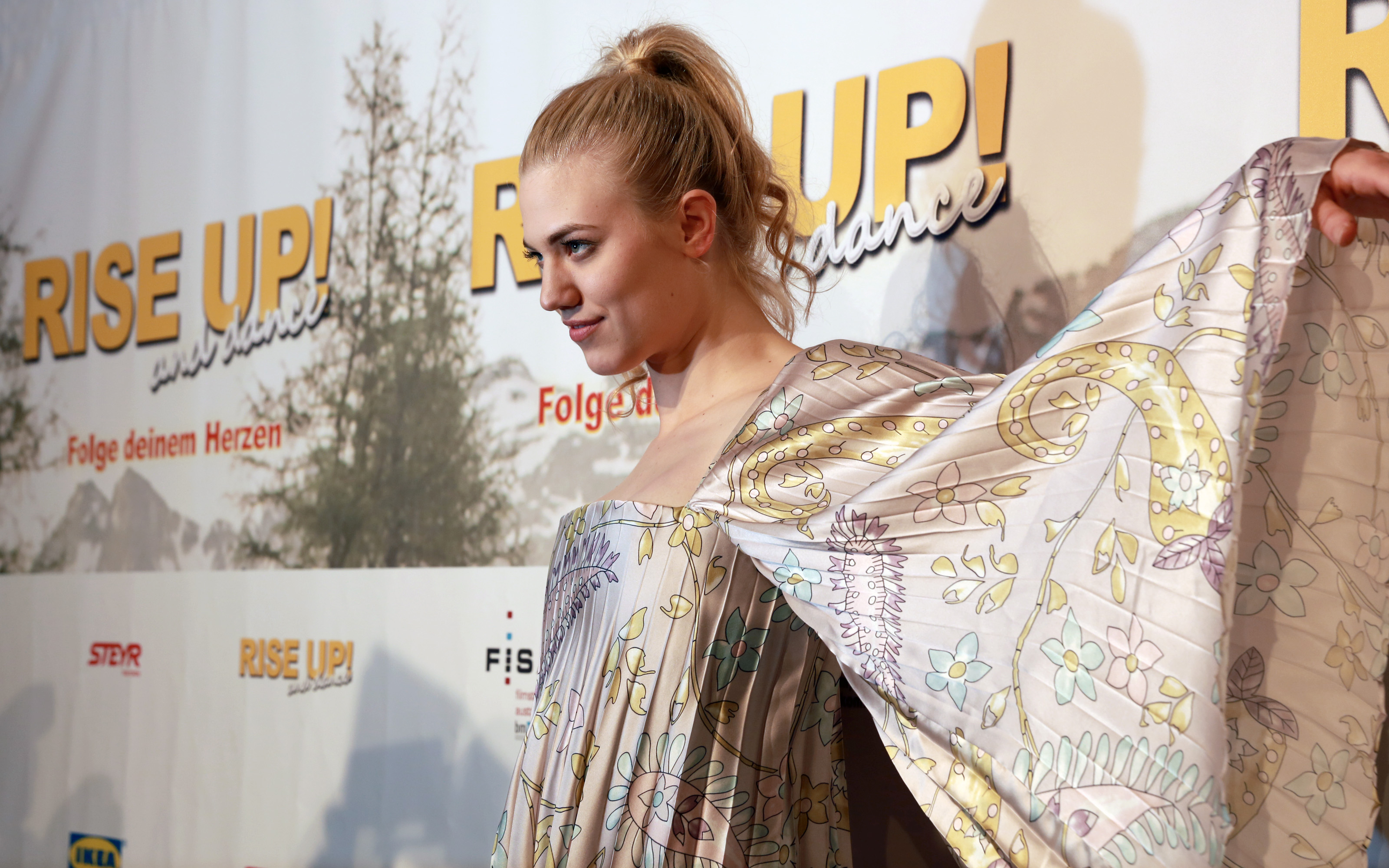
Marolt 2014 at the premier of her film Rise Up! And Dance in Vienna

In early 2010, Marolt participated in a spin-off show from Germany's Next Top Model based on the US reality series Modelville called Die Model WG. Despite getting booked for a runway show in the first episode Marolt decided to quit in Episode 2 in favour of school where she was busy with the preparation of her exams for her upcoming A-Level which she has passed. She went to New York and studied at the Lee Strasberg Institute. After she graduated, she went to Berlin where she played the role of Maxi Koenig in the German series Anna und die Liebe. She also played a role in the TV series Danni Lowinski.

Marolt's first movie, the Austrian production Rise Up! And Dance directed by Barbara Gräftner, premiered on March 11, 2014, at the UCI Cinema in the Millennium City in Vienna. Marolt also plays in the 2013 Austrian horror movie Hopped Up - Friedliche Droge, directed by Michael Fischa, the lead role. The film would be shown early 2014 in cinemas in Austria and Germany.

In 2014, she participated in the German version of I'm a Celebrity...Get Me Out of Here! and finished 2nd place. Marolt had to perform altogether ten bushtucker trials, which are used to allow the contestants to gain food and treats for the camp. She was selected by the TV viewers in Germany, Austria and Switzerland to eight trials in a row setting a new world record, as no other celebrity in any of the international shows had been chosen that often consecutively.

On 8 February 2014, Marolt was honoured by her birth town of Klagenfurt with a reception and received from its mayor Christian Scheider the 'Special Lindwurm Award'. This special award was bestowed before only once in 2004 to the German entertainer Thomas Gottschalk.

From 28 March 2014 to 16 May, Marolt took part in the seventh series of the German TV show Let's Dance and finished in fourth place with her dancing partner Massimo Sinató.

On 26 April 2014, Marolt won a Romy award at the 25th Romy TV Awards ceremony in the Vienna Hofburg.

Marolt participated in the German television game show Schlag den Star, an offshoot of the Schlag den Raab show, and compete in the first episode under the motto "Duell der Schönheiten" on 19 July 2014 against presenter and model Annica Hansen.

From mid-September 2014, Marolt would join Peter Rapp, Oliver Pocher and Petra Frey on the jury of the fourth season of ORF's talent show Die große Chance.

On 17 June 2014, Marolt received the "New-Face-Award" at the Leading Ladies Award ceremony in Vienna. The prizes were awarded in eight categories by Austria's weekly women magazine Madonna for the eighth time. Other winners besides Marolt were Christina Stürmer, Anna Fenninger, Ursula Karven and Sara Nuru.

In August 2014, Marolt helped to raise awareness of the disease ALS by participating in the Ice Bucket Challenge.

The head of RTL Television, Frank Hoffmann, announced on 17 July 2014 that filming of a docudrama centering on the life of Marolt had started. The docudrama titled Larissa Goes to Hollywood started to be screened in Germany on 25 April 2015.

In January 2016, Marolt shared the first place at the styling contest Promi Shopping Queen by the German television channel VOX with the actor Thomas Held. She was shopping with her sister Lisa-Marie in Klagenfurt and donated the prize money to the Kärntner Kinderkrebshilfe.

Since October 2024, Marolt is one of the main judges on Sport1's fashion reality competition series My Style Rocks.

== Personal life ==
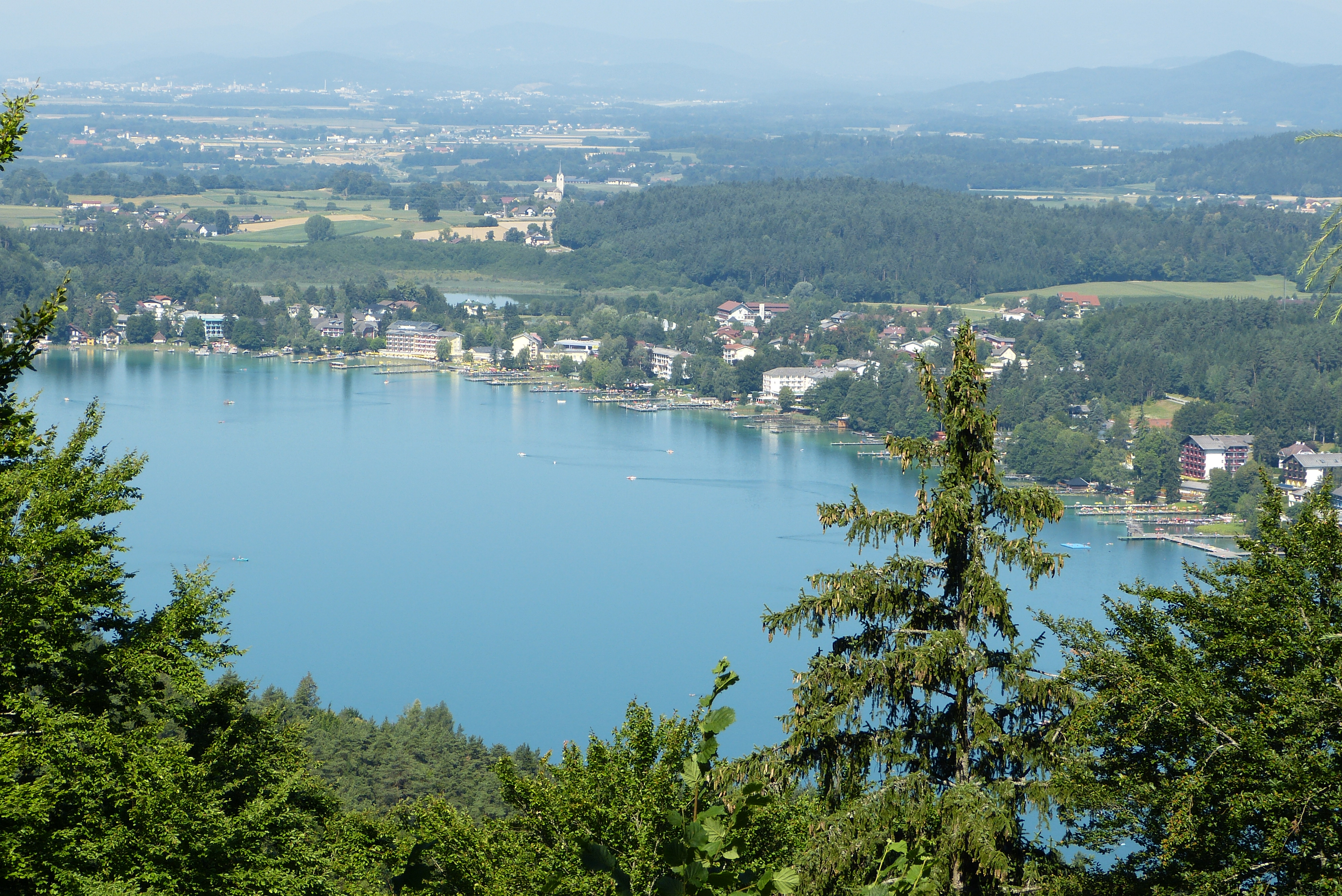
Lake Klopein

Marolt dated filmmaker Whitney Sudler-Smith from 2011 to 2016.

In 2015, Marolt bought together with her father the hotel Seehotel Klopein at the Lake Klopein located within the municipality of Sankt Kanzian in Carinthia, Austria. The three star hotel consisting of nine buildings was sold by the UniCredit Bank Austria AG to the Marolt Hotel GmbH and is only one kilometer away from the hotel owned by her parents.

== TV appearances ==
- 2009: Austria's Next Topmodel
- 2009: Germany's Next Topmodel
- 2009: Granaten wie wir
- 2010: Wir sind Kaiser
- 2010: Die Model-WG
- 2012: Das perfekte Promi-Dinner
- 2013: taff (Projekt Paradies: Promi-Heilfasten)
- 2014: Ich bin ein Star – Holt mich hier raus!
- 2014: Wir sind Kaiser
- 2014: 5 gegen Jauch
- 2014: Das perfekte Promi-Dinner
- 2014: Markus Lanz
- 2014: Let's Dance
- 2014: Schlag den Star
- 2014: Die große Chance (jury)
- 2015: Die große Chance der Chöre (jury)
- 2015: Larissa goes to Hollywood
- 2016: Promi Shopping Queen
- 2016: Jungen gegen Mädchen
- 2017: Global Gladiators
- 2024: My Style Rocks

== Filmography ==
- 2009: Eine wie keine (Television series)
- 2011: Anna und die Liebe (Television series, 1 episode)
- 2013: Danni Lowinski (Television series, 1 episode)
- 2013: Cop Stories (Television series, 1 episode)
- 2014: Rise Up! And Dance
- 2015: SOKO 5113 (Television series, 1 episode)
- 2015: Alarm für Cobra 11 (Television series, 1 episode)
- 2015: Mila (Television series, 1 episode)
- 2016: Hopped Up – Friedliche Droge
- 2017—2019: Storm of Love (Original title: "Sturm der Liebe", Television series, 274 episodes)
- 2020—2021: Blutige Anfänger (Television series, 11 episodes)
- 2022: Unter Uns (Television series, unknown episodes)
- 2023: Hotel Mondial (Television series, 1 episode)
- 2023: Die Chefin (Television series, 1 episode)
- 2024: Die Passion (Television film)
- 2025: Parallel Me (Television series, 1 episode)

== Awards ==
- 2014 Special Lindwurm Award
- 2014 Romy
- 2014 Leading Ladies Awards (New-Face-Award category)

Preceded by None	Austria's Next Topmodel winner Cycle 1 (2009)	Succeeded by Aylin Kösetürk
