= Franziska Knuppe =

German model and actress (born 1974)

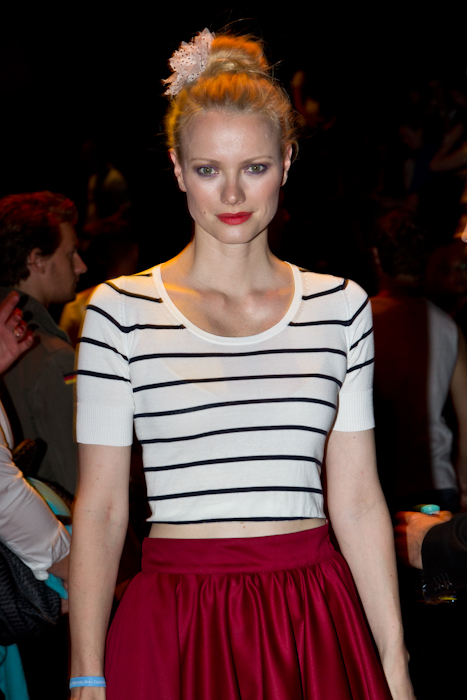
- Franziska Knuppe at Berlin Fashion Week Summer 2012
- Born: 7 December 1974 (age 51); Rostock, East Germany
- Spouse: Christian Möstl (m. 1999)
- Children: 1
- Modeling information
- Height: 1.82 m (6 ft 0 in)
- Hair color: Blonde
- Eye color: Green
- Website: www.knuppe.com

Franziska Knuppe (born 7 December 1974 in Rostock) is a German model and actress.

== Biography ==
She was discovered by designer Wolfgang Joop in 1997 at a café in Potsdam. She was featured prominently in campaigns of Triumph International, JOOP!, Oasis and Reebok. She modeled for e.g. Thierry Mugler, Diane von Fürstenberg, Escada, Rocobarocco, Wunderkind Couture, Jasper Conran, Betty Jackson, Strenesse, Vivienne Westwood and Issey Miyake. She was photographed by i.a. Peter Lindbergh, Karl Lagerfeld, Michel Comte, Manfred Baumann, and Arthur Elgort.

Knuppe married Christian Möstl in 1999. They both had a daughter, Mathilda, in 2007.

In 2008, she was the host of Supermodel and in 2019, she reprised that role on the Austrian equivalent of Austria's Next Top Model. In 2020, she appeared as the Bat on the German version of Masked Singer.

== Award ==
- 2009 Vienna Fashion Award, model category
