= Oliver Stummvoll =

Austrian fashion model (born 1995)

- Born: 13 November 1995 (age 30); Sankt Pölten, Lower Austria, Austria
- Occupation: Model
- Years active: 2014–present
- Modeling information
- Height: 1.84 m (6 ft 0 in)
- Hair color: Blonde
- Eye color: Green
- Agency: D'Management Group; Kult Models Australia; Kult Model Agency; New Madison Model Management; Select Model Management; Soul Artist Management; Wiener Models

Oliver Stummvoll (born 13 November 1995) is an Austrian fashion model. He is best known for being the winner of cycle 6 of Austria's Next Topmodel.

== Austria's Next Topmodel ==
Stummvoll defeated seventeen fellow contestants, including his older brother Manuel and footballer Miro Slavov, to become the first male winner of Austria's Next Topmodel, winning the competition as a result of a public vote in cycle 6's live finale on 4 December 2014. He is also the first male winner of the Top Model franchise. The series' host, model Melanie Scheriau, said of Stummvoll, "Oliver is a worthy winner, he is just great and has great potential." Stummvoll appeared on the cover of GQ Germany and signed with Vienna-based modelling agency Wiener Models as part of his prize package for winning the competition.

== Career ==
Since winning Austria's Next Topmodel, Stummvoll has appeared in editorials in magazines Open Lab, August Man Malaysia, The Fashionisto, Attitude, British GQ, Style Up Your Life!, GQ China, L'Officiel Ukraine and DA MAN. He has appeared in campaigns for Loveday Jeans and BOWEN. He appeared in Versace's global fall/winter 2015 menswear campaign alongside models Alessio Pozzi and River Viiperi, and walked for Jean Paul Gaultier for his spring/summer 2016 collection in Paris Fashion Week in January 2016.

In October 2015, Stummvoll was ranked by Cosmopolitan as one of the most successful contestants of the Top Model franchise. In January 2016, he was named Austria's best-dressed man by GQ Germany.
