= Deutsche Meisterschule für Mode =

Fashion school in Munich, Germany

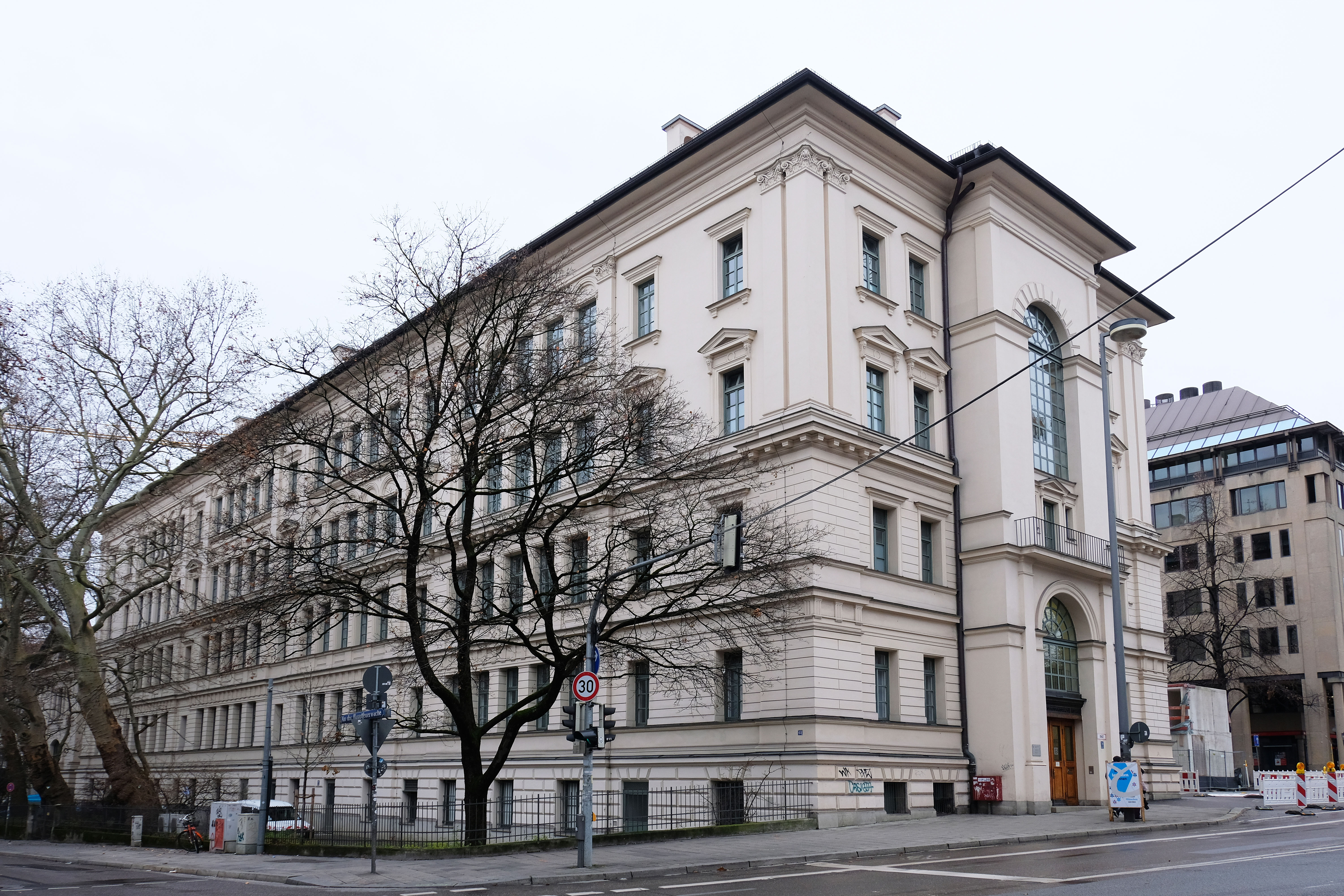
- Munich, Germany

Information
- Type: Public vocational school
- Established: 1931

Deutsche Meisterschule für Mode, is a public vocational college for fashion and communication design in Munich, Germany. It is run by the City of Munich and offers publicly funded programmes in fashion design, pattern cutting and communication design.

== History ==
The Deutsche Meisterschule für Mode was founded in 1931 on the initiative of Munich school superintendent Hans Baier as a nationwide master school for women's tailoring and fashion.

The building was destroyed in the Second World War, and teaching was interrupted in 1944. Classes restarted in May 1946.
