= Austria's Next Topmodel season 8 =

Austria's Next Topmodel
- Season 8
- No. of episodes: 8

Release
- Original network: ATV Austria
- Original release: November 2 – December 21, 2017

Season chronology
- ← Previous; Season 7 Next → Season 9

Austria's Next Topmodel, season 8 is the eighth season of the Austrian reality television show in which a number of men and women compete for the title of Austria's Next Topmodel and a chance to start their career in the modelling industry. The series was broadcast on ATV Austria.

The winner is 21 year-old Isak Omorodion from Upper Austria. As his prizes, he received a contract with Vienna-based modeling agency Wiener Models, a cover of Men's Health magazine, a one-year artist development contract of Studio71 Vienna and an Audi Q2.

== Contestants ==
| Team | Contestant | Age | Height | From | Finish | Place |
|---|---|---|---|---|---|---|
| Marina | Theresa Steinkellner | 21 | 1.73 m (5 ft 8 in) | Spielberg bei Knittelfeld | Episode 2 | 14 (quit) |
| Daniel | Christian Benesch | 21 | 1.83 m (6 ft 0 in) | Vienna | Episode 2 | 13 |
| Marina | Jules Baumgartner | 20 | 1.80 m (5 ft 11 in) | Vienna | Episode 3 | 12-11 |
| Daniel | Doina Barbaneagra | 25 | 1.71 m (5 ft 7 1/2 in) | Vienna | Episode 3 | 12-11 |
| Marina | Edvin Franijc | 25 | 1.87 m (6 ft 1 1/2 in) | Waidhofen an der Thaya-Land | Episode 4 | 10 |
| Daniel | Daniela Kuperion | 18 | 1.70 m (5 ft 7 in) | Steinach am Brenner | Episode 6 | 9 |
| Marina | Lukas Schlinger | 25 | 1.83 m (6 ft 0 in) | Vienna | Episode 6 | 8-7 |
| Daniel | Julia Forstner | 21 | 1.74 m (5 ft 8 1/2 in) | Hollabrunn | Episode 6 | 8-7 |
| Daniel | Maximilian 'Max' Gombocz | 20 | 1.87 m (6 ft 1 1/2 in) | Hall in Tirol | Episode 7 | 6-5 |
| Marina | Sanda Gutic | 23 | 1.77 m (5 ft 9 1/2 in) | Keutschach am See | Episode 7 | 6-5 |
| Marina | Allegra Bell | 21 | 1.73 m (5 ft 8 in) | Fürstenfeld | Episode 8 | 4 |
| Daniel | Simone Sevignani | 26 | 1.83 m (6 ft 0 in) | Kufstein | Episode 8 | 3-2 |
| Marina | Peter Mairhofer | 20 | 1.84 m (6 ft 1/2 in) | Thaur | Episode 8 | 3-2 |
| Daniel | Isak Omorodion | 21 | 1.87 m (6 ft 1 1/2 in) | Steyr | Episode 8 | 1 |

== Episodes ==
=== Episode 1 ===
Original airdate: November 2, 2017

This was the casting episode. The top 24 semi-finalists were narrowed down to the top 14 finalists who moved into their modelhouse.

=== Episode 2 ===
Original airdate: November 9, 2017

- Quit: Theresa Steinkellner
- Eliminated: Christian Benesch
- Featured photographer: Katrin Schöning

=== Episode 3 ===
Original airdate: November 16, 2017

- Booked for a job: Allegra Bell & Edvin Franijc
- Challenge winner: Simone Sevignani
- Eliminated: Doina Barbaneagra & Jules Baumgartner
- Featured photographers: Mato Johannik, Kosmas Pavlos

=== Episode 4 ===
Original airdate: November 23, 2017

- Booked for a job: Allegra Bell & Daniela Kuperion
- Challenge winners: Allegra Bell, Edvin Franijc, Lukas Schlinger, Peter Mairhofer & Sanda Gutic
- Bottom three: Edvin Franijc, Julia Forstner & Sanda Gutic
- Eliminated: Edvin Franijc
- Featured photographer: Richard Kranzin

=== Episode 5 ===
Original airdate: November 30, 2017

- Booked for a job: Isak Omorodion, Julia Forstner & Simone Sevignani
- Challenge winners: Max Gombocz, Peter Mairhofer & Sanda Gutic
- Bottom two: Daniela Kuperion & Lukas Schlinger
- Eliminated: None
- Featured photographer: Isabella Abel

=== Episode 6 ===
Original airdate: December 7, 2017

- Spot for the finale: Isak Omorodion
- Eliminated outside judging panel: Daniela Kuperion
- Challenge winner: Max Gombocz
- Booked for a job: Isak Omorodion & Simone Sevignani
- Bottom three: Allegra Bell, Julia Forstner & Lukas Schlinger
- Eliminated: Julia Forstner & Lukas Schlinger
- Featured photographer: Oliver Gast

=== Episode 7 ===
Original airdate: December 14, 2017

- Immune: Isak Omorodion
- Booked for a job: Max Gombocz & Sanda Gutic
- Eliminated: Max Gombocz & Sanda Gutic
- Featured photographer: Oliver Gast

=== Episode 8 ===
Original airdate: December 21, 2017

- Final four: Allegra Bell, Isak Omorodion, Peter Mairhofer & Simone Sevignani
- Eliminated: Allegra Bell
- Final three: Isak Omorodion, Peter Mairhofer & Simone Sevignani
- Austria's Next Top Model: Isak Omorodion

== Results ==
| Place | Model | Episodes | | | | | | | | |
| Place | Model | 1 | 2 | 3 | 4 | 5 | 6 | 7 | 8 | |
|---|---|---|---|---|---|---|---|---|---|---|
| 1 | Isak | SAFE | SAFE | SAFE | SAFE | SAFE | IMM | IMM | SAFE | Winner |
| 2-3 | Peter | SAFE | SAFE | SAFE | SAFE | SAFE | SAFE | SAFE | SAFE | OUT |
| 2-3 | Simone | SAFE | SAFE | SAFE | SAFE | SAFE | SAFE | SAFE | SAFE | OUT |
| 4 | Allegra | SAFE | SAFE | SAFE | SAFE | SAFE | LOW | LOW | OUT | |
| 5-6 | Max | SAFE | SAFE | SAFE | SAFE | SAFE | SAFE | OUT | | |
| 5-6 | Sanda | SAFE | SAFE | SAFE | LOW | SAFE | SAFE | OUT | | |
| 7-8 | Julia | SAFE | SAFE | SAFE | LOW | LOW | OUT | | | |
| 7-8 | Lukas | SAFE | SAFE | SAFE | SAFE | LOW | OUT | | | |
| 9 | Daniela | SAFE | SAFE | SAFE | SAFE | LOW | OUT | | | |
| 10 | Edvin | SAFE | SAFE | SAFE | OUT | | | | | |
| 11-12 | Doina | SAFE | SAFE | OUT | | | | | | |
| 11-12 | Jules | SAFE | SAFE | OUT | | | | | | |
| 13 | Christian | SAFE | OUT | | | | | | | |
| 14 | Theresa | SAFE | QUIT | | | | | | | |

The contestant quit the competition
The contestant was eliminated
The contestant was in danger of elimination
The contestant was immune from elimination
The contestant was eliminated outside of judging panel
The contestant won the competition

=== Photo shoot guide ===
- Episode 1 photo shoot: Swimsuits (casting)
- Episode 2 photo shoot: Posing nude in pairs
- Episode 3 photo shoot: Alternative fashion in a church
- Episode 4 photo shoot: Romance on the Orient Express
- Episode 5 photo shoot: Partying with their mentor
- Episode 6 photo shoot: Candyland couture with Lilly Becker
- Episode 7 photo shoot: Men's Health and Women's Health magazine covers
