= Strenesse =

German fashion company

- Industry: Fashion
- Founded: 1949
- Founder: Strehle family
- Headquarters: Nördlingen, Germany
- Products: Clothing, accessories, eyewear, fragrance

Strenesse is a German fashion label founded by the Strehle family in Nördlingen in 1949. Under the creative direction of Gabriele Strehle, the company became known for minimalist women's ready-to-wear and later expanded into accessories, fragrance and menswear. The operating companies behind the brand filed for insolvency in 2014 and again in 2019, and business operations were discontinued in 2020. In 2026, the brand's website listed Munich-based Brand House Production GmbH as its operator.

== History ==
The company began in 1949 as a family business in Nördlingen producing coats and other classic women's clothing. In the late 1960s it adopted the name Strenesse, derived from the family name Strehle and the French word jeunesse. During the 1970s, Gabriele Strehle emerged as the label's leading creative figure; English-language reference works credit her with shaping the house's pared-back aesthetic and helping turn it into an internationally known German fashion brand.

Strenesse expanded internationally in the 1990s. The secondary line Strenesse Blue was launched in 1993, and the brand began showing at Milan Fashion Week in 1995. By the late 1990s the main women's line was marketed as Strenesse Gabriele Strehle. Vogue documented Strenesse collections on the Milan schedule from 1999 onward.

In 2000 the company became Strenesse AG and expanded in New York and Milan. It launched a fragrance line in 2001, and around the same period Strenesse designed new uniforms for Lufthansa's female flight and ground staff. The label also moved into menswear in the early 2000s and was later noted for dressing the Germany national football team at official appearances. By 2012, the Strenesse Blue range was discontinued.

Gabriele Strehle announced her departure from the company in 2012. In 2013, designer Natalie Acatrini became creative director, overseeing the label’s women’s, men’s and accessories collections.

After a prolonged financial decline, Strenesse filed for insolvency in April 2014. Reuters reported at the time that sales had fallen to about €50 million from more than €100 million at the brand's peak. A later relaunch did not solve the company's problems: Strenesse New GmbH again sought self-administration in 2019, and in July 2020 trade publication Shoez reported that the business would be discontinued at the end of the year, citing the effects of the COVID-19 pandemic.
