= Austria's Next Topmodel season 5 =

Austria's Next Topmodel
- Season 5
- No. of episodes: 10

Release
- Original network: PULS4
- Original release: 3 January – 7 March 2013

Season chronology
- ← Previous; Season 4 Next → Season 6

Austria's Next Topmodel, season 5 was the fifth season of the Austrian reality documentary based on Tyra Banks America's Next Top Model. Having the entire panel of judges replaced, Austrian-born international fashion model Melanie Scheriau became the new host and was joined by runway-model and former Lagerfeld-muse Carmen Kreuzer, who was also the casting director for the season, and Rolf Scheider, who was already a judge during the third and fourth season of Germany's Next Topmodel.

The show kicked off on January 3, 2013 with the lowest ratings on the premiere for the history of the show. In difference to other years the casting process was not featured in the premiere episode. Instead the final 20 contestants arrived in a military bootcamp and were then taken to Egypt, where at the end of the first episode, the cast of the top 15 was selected.

The winner of the competition was 18-year-old Greta Uszkai from Vienna. As her prizes, she received a contract with Vienna-based modeling agency Wiener Models, a cover of Austrian Woman magazine, a position as the face of Hervis sportwear, a cruise trip for two courtesy of AIDA Cruises and a SEAT León.

== Episodes ==
=== Episode 1 ===
Original airdate: January 3, 2013

- Challenge winner/Immune: Charlotte Aichhorn, Iris Mann, Katrin Krinner, Sabrina-Nathalie Reitz, Stefanie Wedam & Vanessa Rolke
- Quit: Jennifer Bauderer
- Eliminated: Ghofran Rashwan, Lyn Amit & Michelle Jovic
- Bottom two: Luca Stemer & Sandra Rauter Leeb
- Eliminated: Sandra Rauter Leeb

=== Episode 2 ===
Original airdate: January 10, 2013

- Challenge winner: Greta Uszkai
- Eliminated: Charlotte Rothpletz
- Bottom two: Charlotte Aichhorn & Isabelle Sylvie
- Eliminated: None

=== Episode 3 ===
Original airdate: January 17, 2013

- Challenge winner: Iris Mann & Vanessa Rolke
- Bottom two: Aleksandra Stankovic & Nadja Sejranic
- Eliminated: Nadja Sejranic

=== Episode 4 ===
Original airdate: January 24, 2013

- Challenge winner: Iris Mann & Stefanie Wedam
- Booked for job: Greta Uszkai, Tatjana Catic & Vanessa Rolke
- Quit: Tatjana Catic
- Eliminated: Sabrina Kastner

=== Episode 5 ===
Original airdate: January 31, 2013

- Eliminated outside of judging panel: Iris Mann
- Immune: Aleksandra Stankovic & Katrin Krinner
- Challenge winner: None
- Booked for job: Aleksandra Stankovic, Luca Stemer & Sabrina-Nathalie Reitz
- Eliminated: Sina Lisa Petru

=== Episode 6 ===
Original airdate: February 7, 2013

- Challenge winner: None
- Booked for job: Aleksandra Stankovic
- Eliminated: Sabrina-Nathalie Reitz

=== Episode 7 ===
Original airdate: February 14, 2013

- Challenge winner: None
- Booked for job: Katrin Krinner & Charlotte Aichhorn
- Bottom two: Luca Stemer & Vanessa Rolke
- Eliminated: Luca Stemer

=== Episode 8 ===
Original airdate: February 21, 2013

- Challenge winner: Aleksandra Stankovic
- Booked for job: Stefanie Wedam
- Eliminated: Vanessa Rolke

=== Episode 9 ===
Original airdate: February 28, 2013

- Challenge winner: Greta Uszkai
- Booked for job: Aleksandra Stankovic
- Eliminated: Isabelle Sylvie
- Bottom two: Charlotte Aichhorn & Stefanie Wedam
- Eliminated: Charlotte Aichhorn

=== Episode 10 ===
Original airdate: March 3, 2013

- Final four: Aleksandra Stankovic, Greta Uszkai, Katrin Krinner & Stefanie Wedam
- First eliminated: Stefanie Wedam
- Finale three: Aleksandra Stankovic, Greta Uszkai & Katrin Krinner
- Second eliminated: Aleksandra Stankovic
- Finale two: Greta Uszkai & Katrin Krinner
- Austria's next topmodel: Greta Uszkai

== Contestants ==
(ages stated are at start of contest)

Contestant	Age	Height	Home City	Finish	Place
Charlotte Rothpletz	23	1.70 m (5 ft 7 in)	Fribourg, Switzerland	Episode 2	15
Nadja Sejranic	20	1.74 m (5 ft 8 1/2 in)	Vienna	Episode 3	14
Tatjana Catic	21	1.73 m (5 ft 8 in)	Linz	Episode 4	13 (quit)
Sabrina Kastner	23	1.73 m (5 ft 8 in)	Vienna	Episode 4	12
Iris Mann	20	1.78 m (5 ft 10 in)	Klagenfurt	Episode 5	11
Sina Lisa Petru	18	1.77 m (5 ft 9 1/2 in)	Vienna	Episode 5	10
Sabrina-Nathalie Reitz	22	1.75 m (5 ft 9 in)	Langenselbold, Germany	Episode 6	9
Luca Stemer	24	1.82 m (5 ft 11 1/2 in)	Vienna	Episode 7	8
Vanessa Rolke	26	1.77 m (5 ft 9 1/2 in)	Vienna	Episode 8	7
Isabelle Postl	23	1.77 m (5 ft 9 1/2 in)	Trautmannsdorf an der Leitha	Episode 9	6–5
Charlotte Aichhorn	21	1.78 m (5 ft 10 in)	Vienna	Episode 9	6–5
Stefanie Wedam	20	1.81 m (5 ft 11 1/2 in)	Graz	Episode 10	4
Aleksandra Stankovic	20	1.77 m (5 ft 9 1/2 in)	Vienna	Episode 10	3
Katrin Krinner	18	1.80 m (5 ft 11 in)	Garsten	Episode 10	2
Greta Uszkai	18	1.78 m (5 ft 10 in)	Vienna	Episode 10	1

== Summaries ==
=== Results table ===
Place	Model	Episodes												
Place	Model	1 (Note: In episode 1, Charlotte, Iris, Katrin, Sabrina-Nathalie, Stefanie & Vanessa were immune from elimination for winning the challenge.)	2	3	4	5		6	7	8	9	10		
1	Greta	SAFE	SAFE	SAFE	SAFE	LOW	SAFE	SAFE	SAFE	SAFE	SAFE	LOW	SAFE	Winner
2	Katrin	IMM	SAFE	SAFE	SAFE	IMM	SAFE	SAFE	SAFE	SAFE	SAFE	SAFE	LOW	OUT
3	Aleksandra	SAFE	SAFE	LOW	SAFE	SAFE	SAFE	SAFE	SAFE	SAFE	SAFE	SAFE	OUT	
4	Stefanie	IMM	SAFE	SAFE	SAFE	SAFE	SAFE	SAFE	SAFE	SAFE	LOW	OUT		
5-6	Charlotte A.	IMM	LOW	SAFE	SAFE	SAFE	SAFE	SAFE	SAFE	SAFE	OUT			
5-6	Isabelle	SAFE	LOW	SAFE	SAFE	SAFE	SAFE	SAFE	SAFE	SAFE	OUT			
7	Vanessa	IMM	SAFE	SAFE	SAFE	SAFE	SAFE	SAFE	LOW	OUT				
8	Luca	SAFE	SAFE	SAFE	SAFE	SAFE	SAFE	SAFE	OUT					
9	Sabrina-Nathalie	IMM	SAFE	SAFE	SAFE	SAFE	SAFE	OUT						
10	Sina-Lisa	SAFE	SAFE	SAFE	SAFE	SAFE	OUT							
11	Iris	IMM	SAFE	SAFE	SAFE	OUT								
12	Sabrina	SAFE	SAFE	SAFE	OUT									
13	Tatjana	SAFE	SAFE	SAFE	QUIT									
14	Nadja	SAFE	SAFE	OUT										
15	Charlotte R.	SAFE	OUT											

The contestant quit the competition
The contestant was eliminated outside of judging panel
The contestant was immune from elimination
The contestant was in danger of elimination
The contestant was eliminated
The contestant won the competition

=== Photo shoot guide ===
- Episode 1 photo shoot: Recreating H&Ms swimwear campaign
- Episode 2 photo shoot: Nomads posing with a camel
- Episode 3 photo shoot: Recreating Rich Proseccos campaign with Paris Hilton
- Episode 4 photo shoot: Recreating Louis Vuittons campaign with Marc Jacobs and Naomi Campbell
- Episode 5 photo shoot: Recreating Jimmy Choo's 2012 handbag campaign
- Episode 6 photo shoot: Recreating Vöslauer's underwater campaign
- Episode 7 photo shoot: Recreating Louis Vitton's campaign with Madonna
- Episode 8 photo shoot: Recreating a topless Calvin Klein campaign
- Episode 10 photo shoots: Golden beauty shots; swimwear in the beach

== Judges ==
- Melanie Scheriau (Host)
- Carmen Kreuzer
- Rolf Scheider
