= Papis Loveday =

Senegalese model and fashion entrepreneur

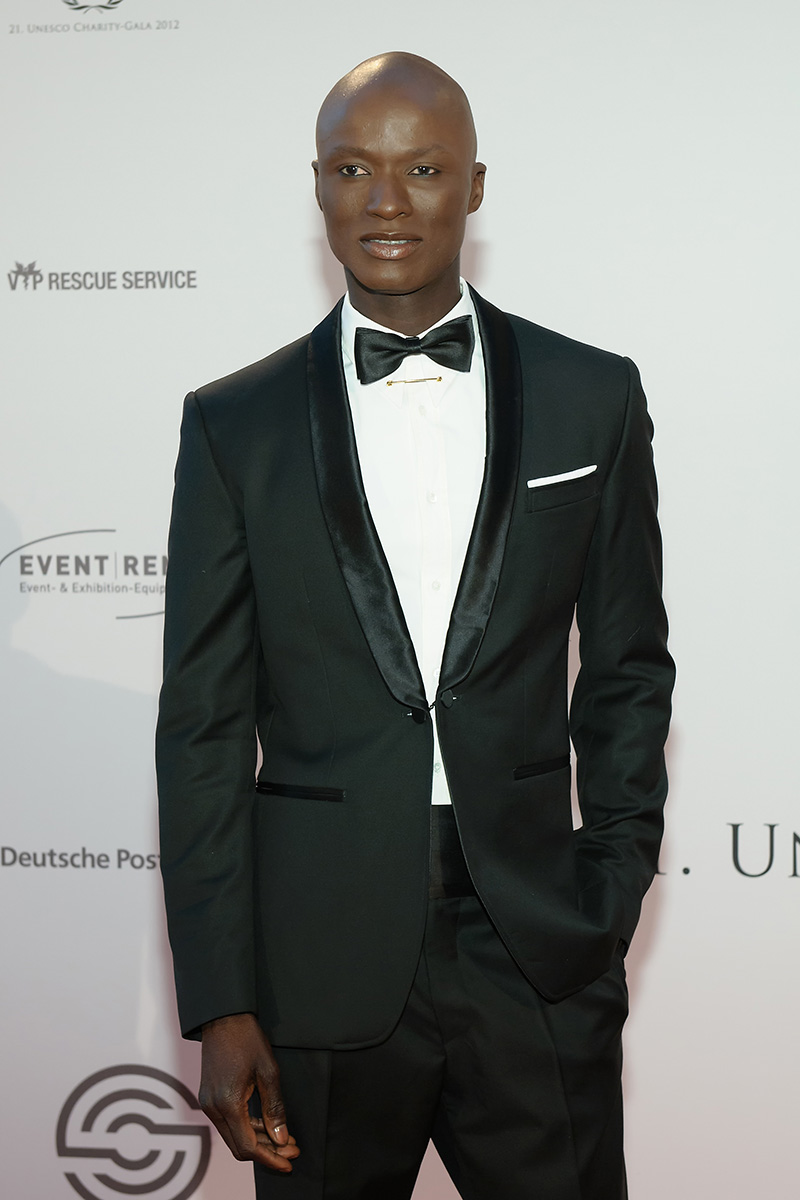
Loveday at the 21st UNESCO Charity Gala in Düsseldorf

Papis Loveday (born 3 January 1977) is a Senegalese model and fashion entrepreneur. He gained fame through a United Colors of Benetton worldwide campaign in 2003. In 2011 he founded the brand Papis Loveday, which includes a fragrance line, champagne brand and denim and jeans collection.

== Biography ==
=== Childhood and discovery ===
Loveday was born in Dakar, Senegal. His mother was a diplomat and his father a medical doctor. He has 6 siblings and 19 half-siblings. He graduated from a private high school in Dakar. As a teenager he pursued a career in athletics and was most successful in the 400 metre sprint. With the support of a national sports scholarship, he moved to Paris, where he studied computer science. Loveday was discovered by a sport photographer during his preparations for the athletics world cup.

=== Career ===
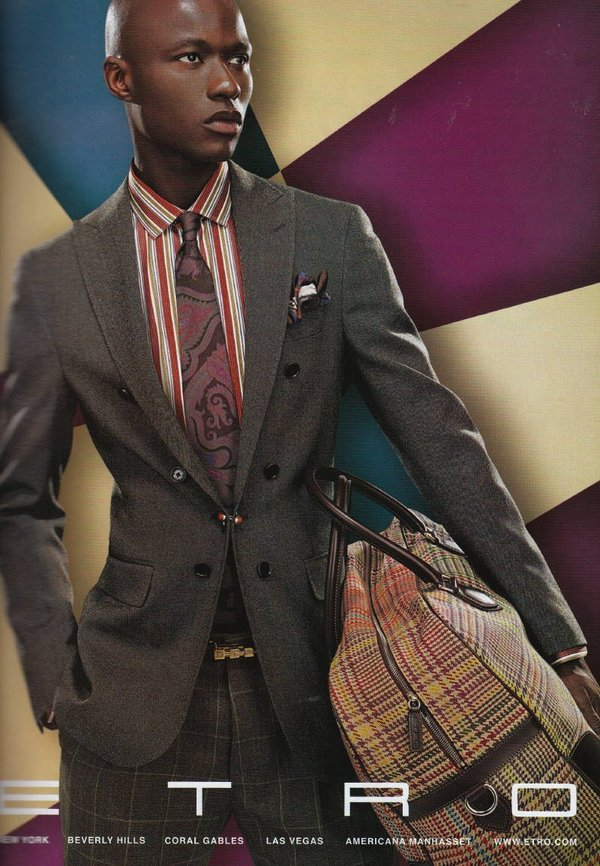
Loveday in a 2009 campaign for Etro

Loveday began modelling in 2003. He signed a contract with Riccardo Gay Model Management in Milan. A few weeks later, United Colors of Benetton booked him for a worldwide advertising campaign which was photographed by Oliviero Toscani. Shortly after, he was featured in a campaign by Italian footwear label Debut together with supermodel Natasha Poly. Further contracts with the agencies Major Model Management in Paris, DNA Model Management in New York City, AMCK Models in London and Louisa Models in Munich followed. From 2005 to 2008 Loveday was considered the most booked black male model of the world. He worked for the houses of Dior Homme, Valentino, Armani and Vivienne Westwood among others. He walked the runways at Milan and Paris Fashion Weeks for Lanvin, Thierry Mugler, Givenchy, Gucci and Yves Saint Laurent.

In 2009, Loveday switched to Milanese agency Joy Model Management. That year, he appeared in a worldwide campaign for Etro. Loveday was featured on the covers of several fashion magazines, including Ibiza Style Magazine, The Untitled Magazine, Style Up Your Life!, Hype, Posh and The Trend Issue. He was also featured in editorials of magazines including GQ, Vogue hommes, BMM, Cosmopolitan and Collecioni. Loveday was voted "Best Model of the World", by Turkish TV station TV8 in 2009. The readers of German newspaper Süddeutsche Zeitung elected Loveday as "Munich citizen of the year" in 2012.

=== TV ===
Loveday appeared as a guest judge on Austria's Next Topmodel, Germany's Next Topmodel and Die Model WG. In 2014 Loveday became a regular judge on Austria's Next Topmodel. In 2018 he became a judge and coach on Switzerland's Next Topmodel.

In December 2015 and January 2016, Loveday presented his first television series Austria's Next Topmodel Real Life by Papis Loveday, which was produced in Hong Kong and aired on Puls 4. The show documented Loveday mentoring and coaching six novice models in a similar format to the Top Model series.

In August 2021, Loveday was a contestant on the ninth season of Promi Big Brother. Loveday, who had never publicly disclosed his sexuality before, talked about this experiences with homophobia and racism on the show. Loveday reached the finale on August 27 where he came in fourth place.

== Papis Loveday ==
In 2011 Loveday founded, in cooperation with a business partner, the company "baobab holding GmbH", which is based in Munich. It is licensed to globally registered trademarks to the name Papis Loveday, Loveday Jeans and Champagne Papis.

Champagne Papis

The champagne brand was established in 2012. It is listed in several international hotel chains. Since 2015 Champagne Papis gained a large demand in the Asian market. The renowned wine magazine Falstaff evaluated the quality of the champagne, in the course of a blind tasting by a professional jury, and honored it with 90 points. In a further explanation the magazine categorized Champagne Papis as "Excellent champagne, among the best of the year". Currently the sorts Champagne Papis brut "black edition" and Champagne Papis rosé are available in the market.

Loveday Jeans

As a result of a license agreement with Düsseldorf based Ben and GmbH, the denim brand Loveday Jeans was created. The label's collections are developed by former Diesel designers under the supervision of Loveday and are exclusively produced in Italy. After several established collections the brand is today represented in the assortment of 180 shops in Europe. It has also opened showrooms in Milan, Düsseldorf and Munich. Furthermore, the label featured among others Austria's Next Topmodel winner Oliver Stummvoll in various advertising campaigns.

== Social engagement ==
Since 2010 Loveday has been a UNESCO-Ambassador with the UNESCO Foundation for children in need and is promoting UNESCO at public appearances. He is primarily dedicated to projects in Senegal.

Parents without education don't provide education to their children- and therefore nobody ever has the chance for a better life.
The future of Africa lies in education- we should not donate for emergency relief only, but think of long-term investments in education.

— Papis Loveday
