= Annica Hansen =

German presenter and model (born 1982)

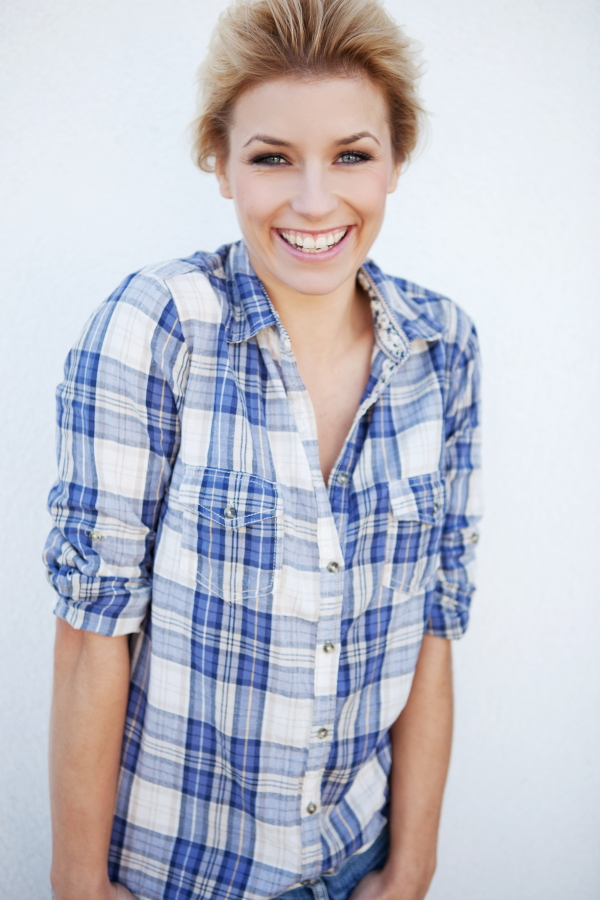
- Hansen in 2011
- Born: Annika Hansen; 16 October 1982 (age 44); Duisburg, Germany
- Website: Official website

Annica Hansen (born Annika Hansen 16 October 1982 in Duisburg, Germany) is a German presenter and model.

== Life and career ==
Hansen grew up in Tönisvorst and moved during her school time to Krefeld. At the age of eighteen she started her model career and moved after her Abitur to Cologne. During her studies of mathematics and "Textile Clothing Management" she started to work as an advertising and catalogue model.

In 2004 she appeared for the first time on television as a sports trainer in the Sat.1 show Kämpf um deine Frau. Receiving elocution lessons at this time, she also took part in the 2004 television series Schulmädchen and subsequently appeared from 2005 to 2006 as a supporting actress in the soap operas Verbotene Liebe and Unter uns.

== Filmography ==
An incomplete list of films in which Annica Hansen has appeared:

- 2004: Life's a Bitch (Musikvideo Motörhead)
- 2004: Schulmädchen
- 2004: Kämpf um Deine Frau
- 2005: Verbotene Liebe
- 2006: Unter uns
- 2008: Männer TV (as presenter)
- 2010: Push – Das Sat.1-Magazin (as reporter)
- since 2010: Galileo (as reporter)
- 2011: Das Model und der Freak – Falling in Love
- 2011: Das perfekte Promi-Dinner
- 2011–2012: ReitTV - Das Pferde- und Reitsportmagazin (as presenter)
- 2011–2013: TV Total Turmspringen
- 2011: Sat.1 Race of Champions (as co-reporter)
- 2012: Annica Hansen – Der Talk (as presenter)
- 2012: ADAC GT Masters, Nürburgring (as co-reporter)
- 2013: Wie werd’ ich …? (as presenter)
- 2013: Elton zockt – Live (as reporter and presenter)
- 2013–2014: Teuer oder Billig – wir testen die Besten! (as reporter)
- 2014: taff-Wochenserie (as presenter)
- 2014: TV total Wok-WM
