= Atıl Kutoğlu =

Turkish fashion designer

Atil Kutoğlu
- Born: Atıl Kutoğlu; Istanbul, Turkey
- Education: Deutsche Schule Istanbul; University of Vienna
- Occupation: Fashion designer
- Label: Atil Kutoglu

Atıl Kutoğlu (born 1968 in Istanbul, Turkey) is a Turkish fashion designer residing in Vienna. Kutoğlu launched his clothing label in 1992 which uses Turkish influences and culture and presents them in a modern way. He is known for dressing celebrities and artists from all over the world.

== Awards ==
- 2013 Vienna Fashion Award as Global Citizen
