= Lena Gercke =

German fashion model and television host

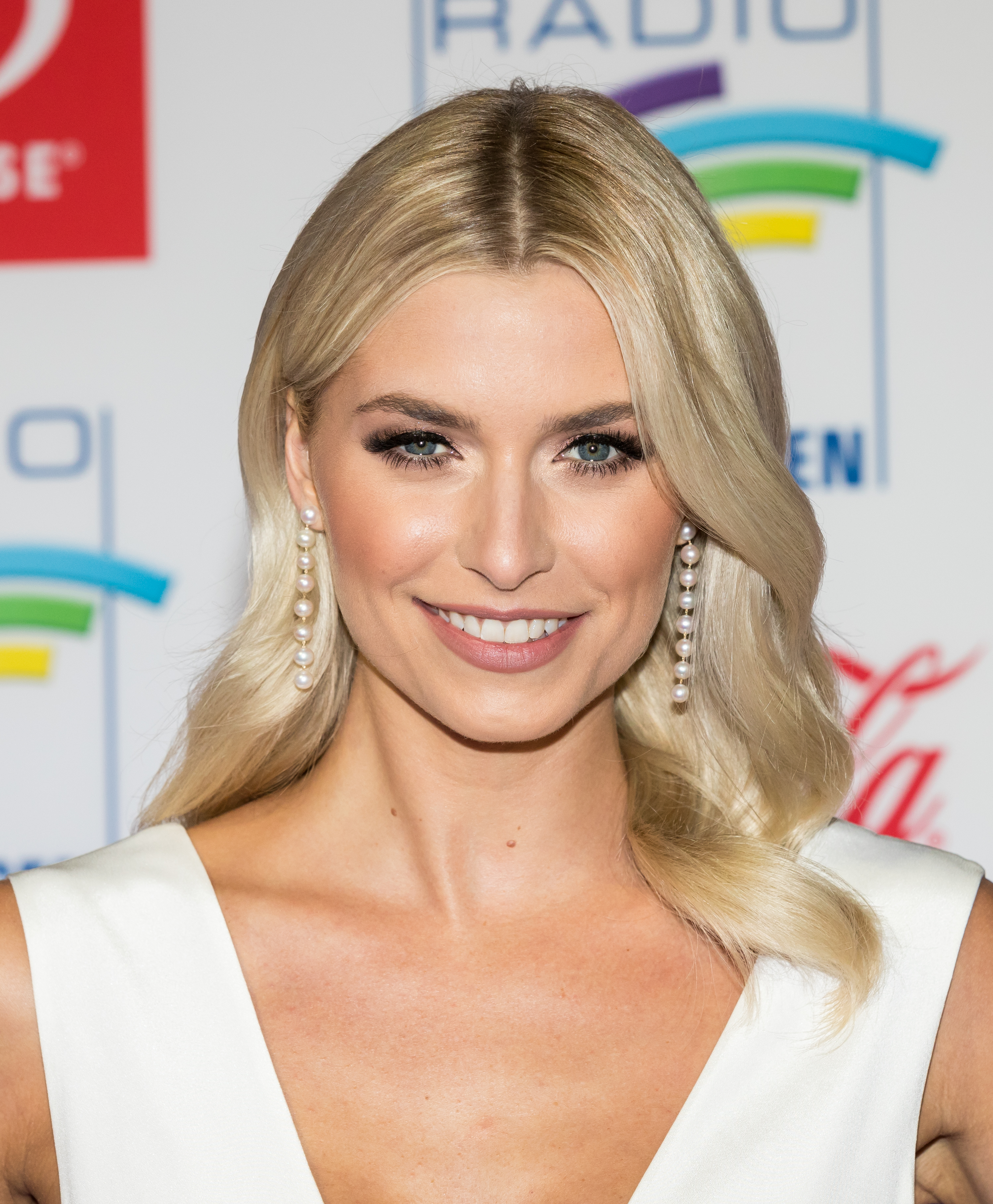
- Gercke in 2018
- Born: Lena Johanna Gercke; 29 February 1988 (age 38); Marburg, West Germany
- Partner: Dustin Schöne
- Children: 2
- Modeling information
- Height: 1.79 m (5 ft 10 1/2 in)
- Hair color: Blonde
- Eye color: Blue
- Website: lena-g.de

Lena Johanna Gercke (born 29 February 1988) is a German fashion model and television host. She won the first season of Germany's Next Topmodel and was the host of Austria's Next Topmodel (seasons 1–4).

== Early life ==
Gercke was born in Marburg and grew up in Cloppenburg, where she attended Liebfrauenschule Cloppenburg (ULF), a Roman Catholic Gymnasium, completing her Abitur in 2007. Gercke is an amateur chess player. She has a sister and two paternal half-sisters.

== Career ==
=== Modeling ===
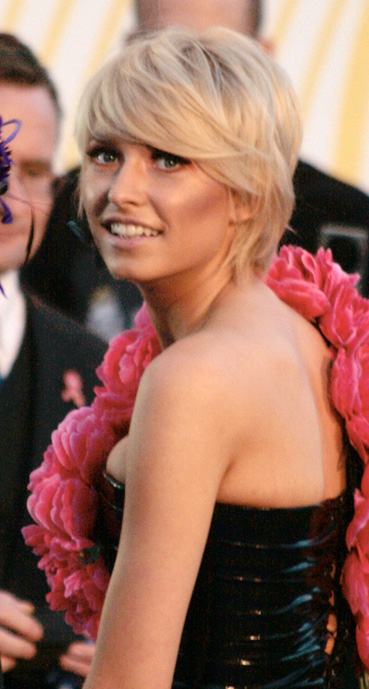
Gercke in 2009

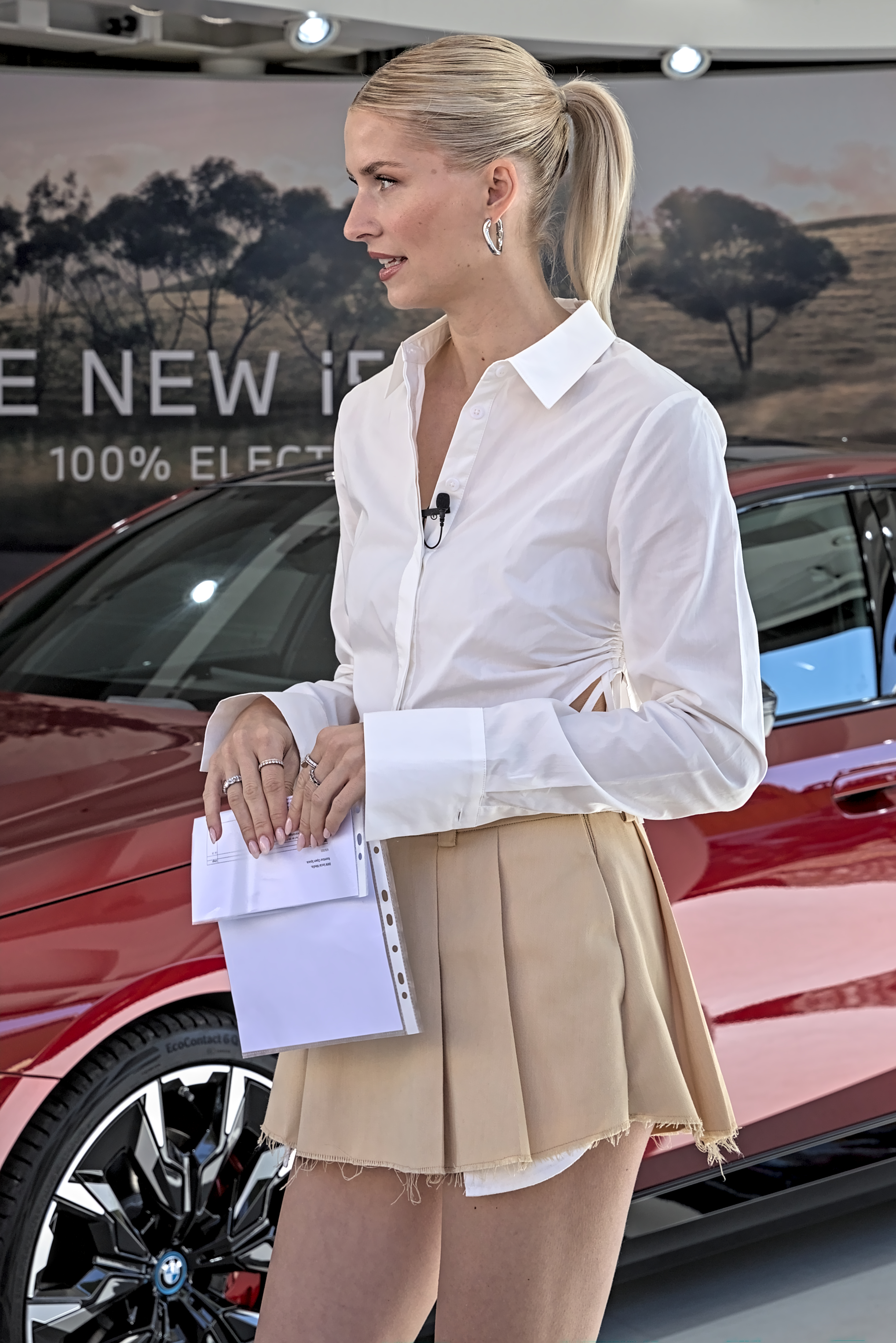
Lena Gercke in 2023

On 14 August 2004, Gercke won a casting call for fast-food chain Burger King. She was represented by Langer-Pueschel, who booked her for photo shoots, catwalk shows, and dance performances. At the beginning of 2006, she attended a casting call for Germany's Next Topmodel hosted by Heidi Klum. Upon winning the competition, she received an advertising contract with the fashion label OuiSet, a modeling contract with IMG Models in Paris, the cover shoot for the June 2006 issue of German Cosmopolitan, and an advertising contract with Microsoft for Windows Live. She also appeared in magazines such as the American issues of Cosmopolitan, Sports Week, and Glamour, and on the cover of French Votre Beauté. She was featured in print campaigns of H&M, Mexx, and Geox. In 2010, she walked on New York Fashion Week for the spring season of Custo Barcelona.

=== Television ===
In 2013, Gercke became a judge on Das Supertalent. In 2014, her sister joined the show for a surprise audition. In 2015, she hosted the primetime hidden camera show Prankenstein. From 2015 to 2021, she presented with Thore Schölermann on the talent show on ProSieben and on Sat.1 The Voice of Germany and from 2018, they presented on The Voice Senior on Sat.1.

== Personal life ==
Gercke's relationship with a film director and fishing tackle entrepreneur, Dustin Schöne, became known in April 2019. They have two daughters born in July 2020 and in December 2022.
