= German fashion =

Culture and history of fashion in Germany

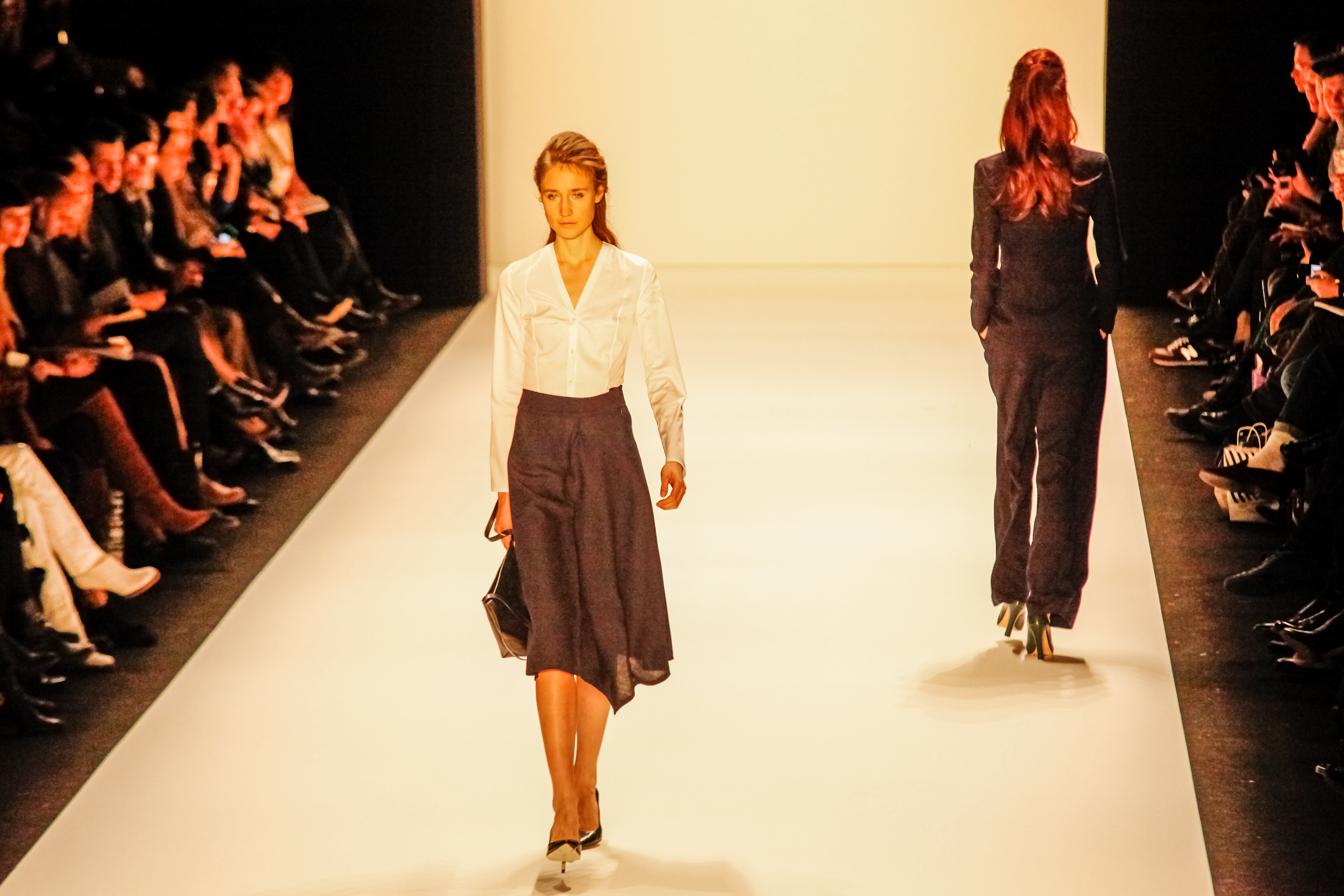
Berlin Fashion Week

German fashion is known for its emerging designers and manufacturers of sports and outdoor clothing, ready-to-wear and custom-made creations.

Berlin, the country's capital city, is also a fashion capital of the world and the home of Berlin Fashion Week, the country's main event where young and creative German fashion designers showcase unique creations. Other important cities to the German fashion landscape are Munich, Hamburg and Cologne. Smaller places such as Herford, Metzingen, Herzogenaurach, Schorndorf, Chemnitz, Albstadt and Detmold are also important design and production hubs of the German fashion industry.

== Cities ==
=== Berlin ===
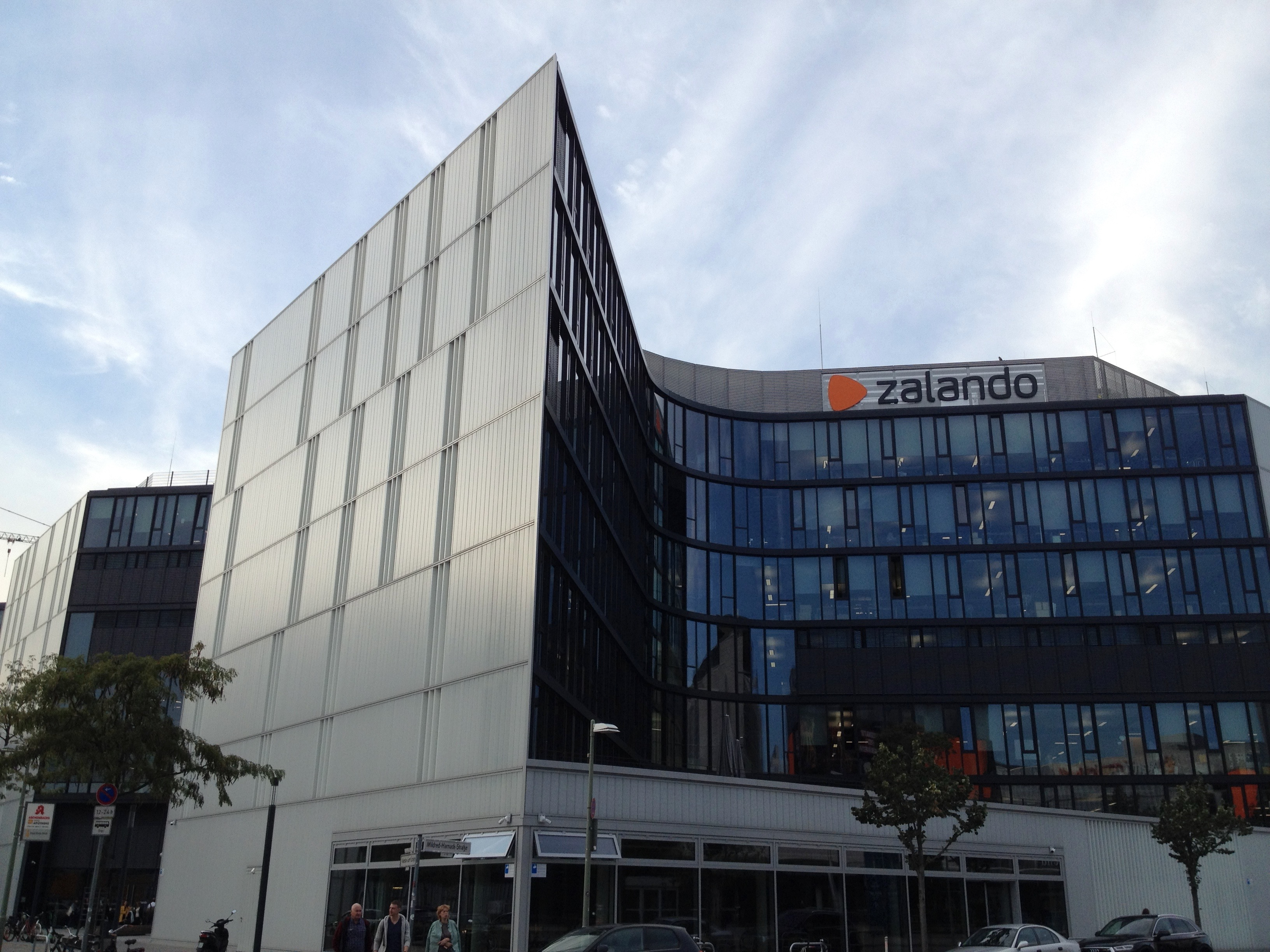
Zalando headquarters in Berlin

Berlin Fashion Week (Berliner Modewoche) is a fashion week held twice annually (in January and July) in Berlin, Germany. Since its establishment in July 2007 it has gained great international attention for its many creative young designers who are flourishing in the fashion capital of Berlin. Since July 2011, the event has taken place in part in front of the Brandenburg Gate.

Mercedes-Benz is the main sponsor of the fashion week.

Zalando SE is a publicly traded German online retailer of shoes, fashion and beauty active across Europe, headquartered in Berlin. The company was founded in 2008 by David Schneider and Robert Gentz and has more than 51 million active users in 25 European markets.

Zalando is active in a variety of business fields – from multi-brand online shopping (including their own brands), the shopping club Lounge by Zalando, outlets in 12 German cities, as well as logistics and marketing offers for retailers. In 2022, Zalando generated revenue of 10.3 billion Euro, with roughly 16,000 employees.

=== Düsseldorf ===
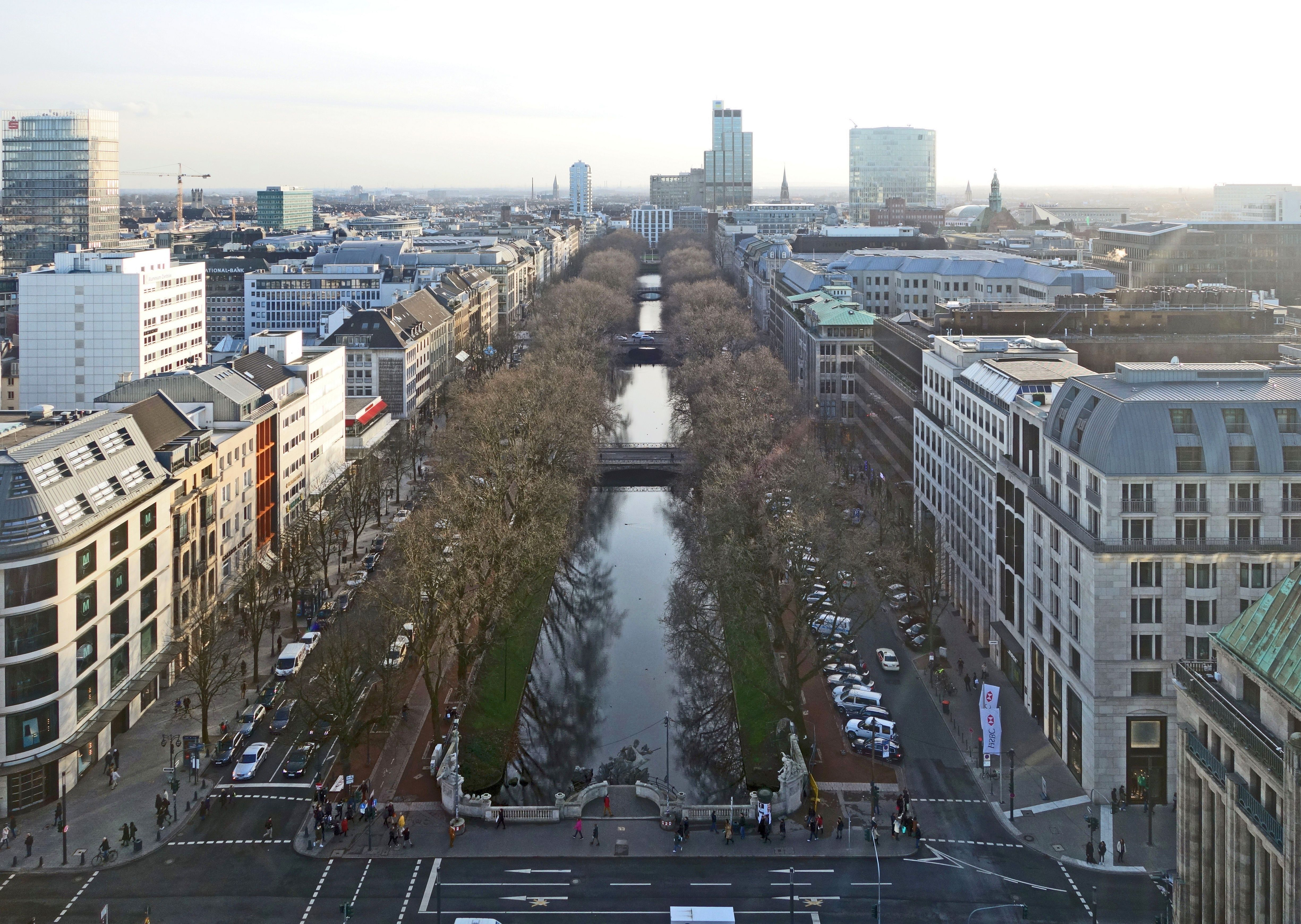
Königsallee

Düsseldorf has been the fashion capital of Germany for decades; it is also a major cultural center for the art scene. Berlin, Germany's 'fashion capital' until 1945, lost its position because of its special location within the Soviet occupation zone. After the monetary reform of June 20, 1948, fashionable clothes trends gained importance. Igedo organised fashion shows staged in Düsseldorf starting in March 1949. There are a number of schools dedicated to fashion design in Düsseldorf, among them Akademie Mode & Design (de), Design Department, and Mode Design College.

The Königsallee is an urban boulevard and is noted for both the landscaped canal that runs along its center, as well as for the fashion showrooms and luxury retail stores located along its sides.

Nicknamed Kö (German pronunciation: [køː]) by locals, the Königsallee is one of Germany's busiest upscale shopping streets.

== Economy ==
In around 1,300 companies with more than 130,000 employees, a revenue of 28 billion Euro is generated by the German textile industry. Almost 44 percent of the products are exported. The textile branch thus is the second largest producer of consumer goods in Germany, after food production.

=== Adidas ===
Adidas AG (German pronunciation: [ˈadiˌdas]; styled as adidas since 1949) is a German multinational athletic apparel and footwear corporation headquartered in Herzogenaurach, Germany. It is the largest sportswear manufacturer in Europe, and the second largest in the world, after Nike. It is the holding company for the Adidas Group, which also owns an 8.33% stake in the football club Bayern Munich, and Runtastic a fitness technology company. Adidas's revenue for 2024 was listed at €23 billion. Adidas is known for its brand image, extensive long origin history for participating in sponsoring athletes, and gear in the FIFA World Cup series. The brand is also recognized for performance innovation of their shoes with ties within sports culture and durability with their focus of sport shoes, clothing, backpacks, and other accessories.

The company was started by Adolf Dassler in his mother's house. He was joined by his elder brother Rudolf in 1924 under the name Gebrüder Dassler Schuhfabrik ("Dassler Brothers Shoe Factory"). Dassler assisted in the development of spiked running shoes (spikes) for multiple athletic events. To enhance the quality of spiked athletic footwear, he transitioned from a previous model of heavy metal spikes to utilising canvas and rubber. Dassler persuaded U.S. sprinter Jesse Owens to use his handmade spikes at the 1936 Summer Olympics. In 1949, following a breakdown in the relationship between the brothers, Adolf created Adidas and Rudolf established Puma, which became Adidas's business rival.

The three stripes are Adidas's identity mark, having been used on the company's clothing and shoe designs as a marketing aid. The branding, which Adidas bought in 1952 from Finnish sports company Karhu Sports for the equivalent of €1,600 and two bottles of whiskey, became so successful that Dassler described Adidas as "The three stripes company".

The most successful shoe from Adidas is the "Samba", due to its retro design and its versatility.

=== Puma ===
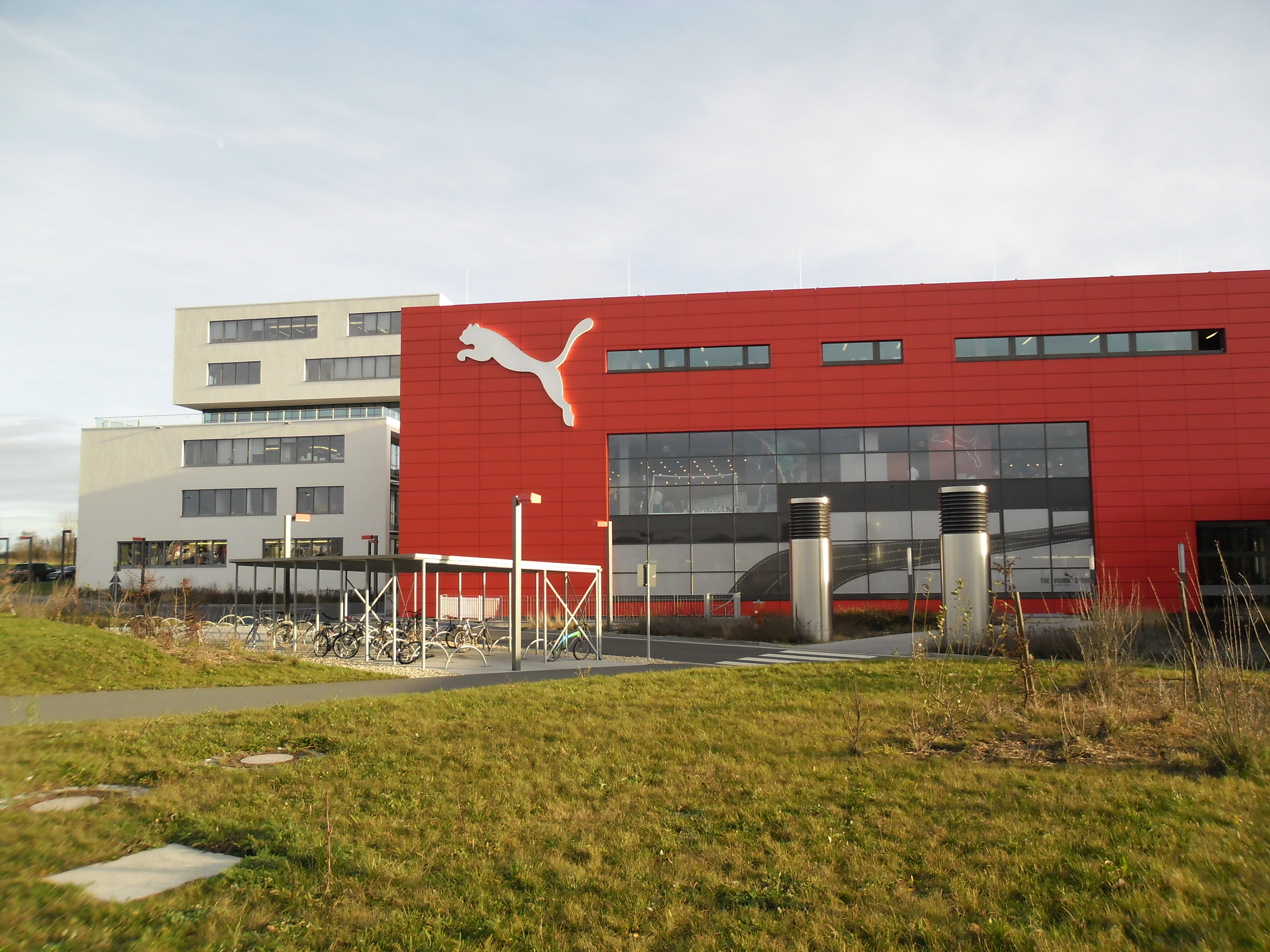
Puma headquarters in Herzogenaurach

Puma SE is a German athletic apparel and footwear corporation headquartered in Herzogenaurach, Bavaria, Germany. Puma is the third largest sportswear manufacturer in the world.

The company was founded in 1948 by Rudolf Dassler (1898–1974). In 1924, Rudolf and his brother Adolf "Adi" Dassler had jointly formed the company Gebrüder Dassler Schuhfabrik ('Dassler Brothers Shoe Factory'). The relationship between the two brothers deteriorated until they agreed to split in 1948, forming two separate entities, Adidas and Puma. Following the split, Rudolf originally registered the newly established company as Ruda (derived from Rudolf Dassler, as Adidas was based on Adi Dassler), but later changed the name to Puma. Puma's earliest logo consisted of a square and beast jumping through a D, which was registered, along with the company's name, in 1948. Puma's shoe and clothing designs feature the Puma logo and the distinctive "Formstrip" which was introduced in 1958.

As of 2022, Puma is operational in over 120 countries worldwide.

=== Other Brands ===
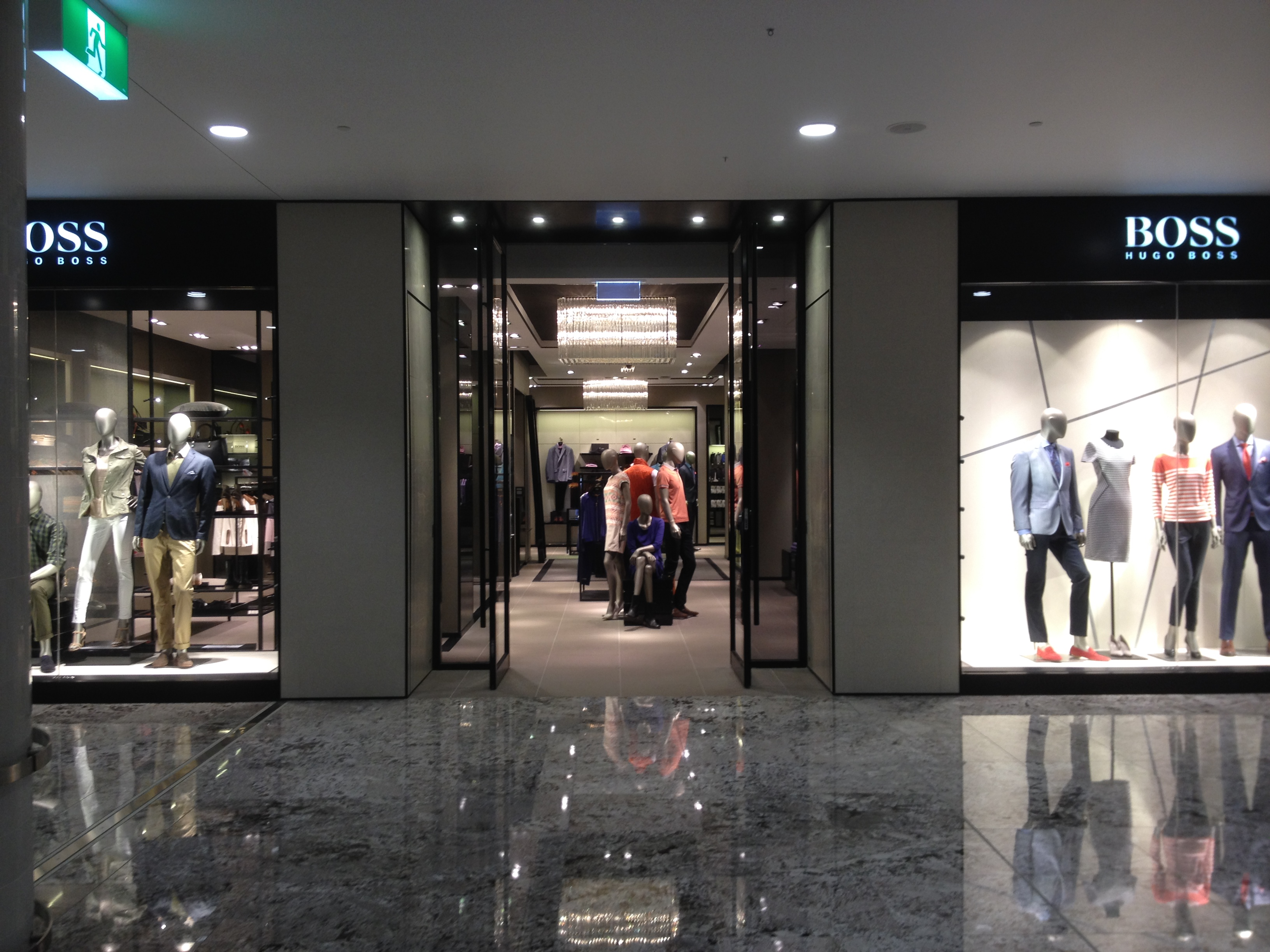
A Hugo Boss store

Other famous fashion brands include Hugo Boss, Tom Tailor, s.Oliver, Jack Wolfskin, JOOP!, Closed, MCM, Escada, Bruno Banani, Jil Sander, Triumph, Schiesser, Reusch, Buffalo, Rohde, Marc O'Polo, Esprit.

There are also various agencies hosting multiple German brands and designers at once, such as zLabels Berlin. Also the big department stores like Kaufhof and Karstadt, retail chains like Peek & Cloppenburg and NewYorker or mail order and online shops like Otto and Zalando have various in-house fashion brands.

=== Fairs ===
The Bread & Butter in Berlin is a leading trade fair for street fashion and ready-to-wear trends, twice annually during Berlin Fashion Week. The Igedo fair Collection Première Düsseldorf in Düsseldorf (CPD) was the world's dominating fashion fair for years.

== Designers ==
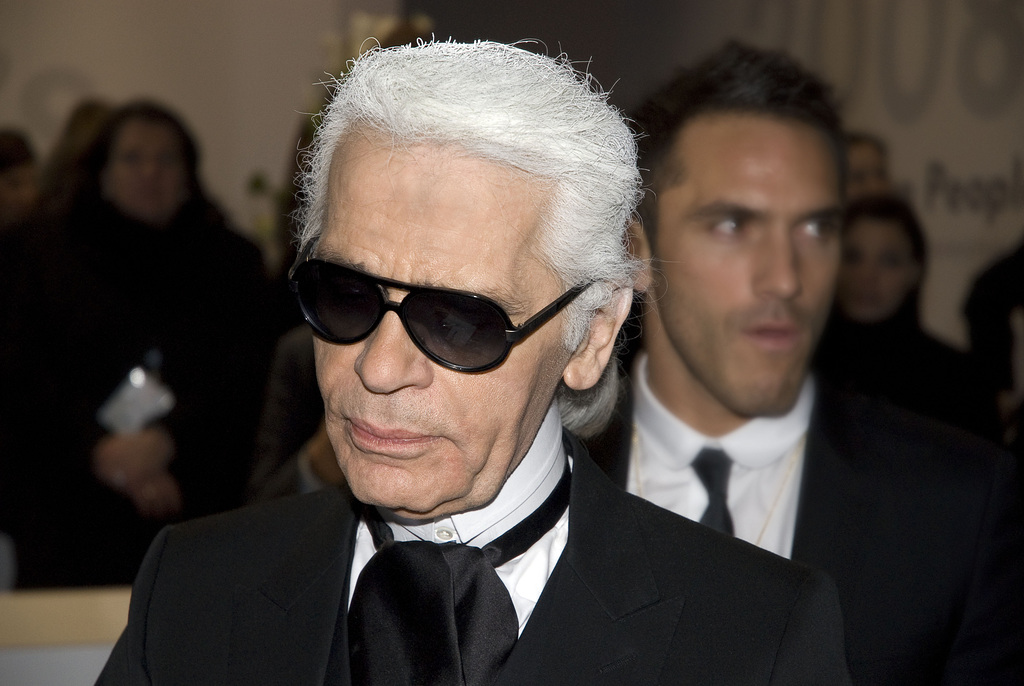
Karl Lagerfeld

Renowned fashion designers from Germany are e.g. Karl Lagerfeld, Hugo Boss, Wolfgang Joop, Jil Sander, Michael Michalsky, Etienne Aigner, Tomas Maier, Robert Geller, Philipp Plein, Rudolph Moshammer, Torsten Amft, Uli Herzner, Gabriele Strehle, Christoph Tisch, Marc Engelhard, Willy Bogner, Rudolf and Adi Dassler.

== Media ==
Important fashion media of Germany include the German Vogue, Elle, InStyle, Cosmopolitan, Vanity Fair, Jolie, Glamour, Grazia, Life&Style and Sleek magazines. The German fashion magazine with the longest continued tradition is Burda Style, that was first published by Aenne Burda in 1950, who also established the major Bauer Media Group. Also various general women magazines and tabloids like Joy, Brigitte, Petra, Gala and Bunte are influential in regards to fashion perception.

As for television, FashionTV can be received via cable or satellite. Various casting shows reach a large audience in Germany, including Germany's Next Topmodel by Heidi Klum. Also on ProSieben, the series Fashion Hero starring Claudia Schiffer was looking for fashion design talents. The Shopping Queen format at VOX stars designer Guido Maria Kretschmer, it provides five contestants with 500 EUR to buy them a fashion outfit and styling in four hours, to compete with each other.

== Agencies ==
Important modeling agency locations in Germany are Berlin (izaio, CORE Artist Management, Seeds Models, Viva Models, OneEins), Munich (Louisa Models, Most Wanted Models, Munich Models, Nova Models, Talents München, Vivienne Models) and Hamburg ( CORE Artist Management, MGM Models, iconic management, m 4 models, Mega Models, Model Management, Modelwerk, Most Wanted Models, Place Models, PMA Models). Also agencies in Vienna and Zurich host models based in Germany, as well as major global agencies like IMG Models, DNA, Elite, Models 1 and NEXT.

=== Models ===
There is a range of fashion models from Germany that made it to international fame, such as Claudia Schiffer, Heidi Klum, Diane Kruger, Eva Padberg, Toni Garrn, Julia Stegner, Tatjana Patitz, Anna Ewers, Manon von Gerkan, Birte Glang, Nico, Uschi Obermaier, Carola Remer, Franziska Knuppe, Vanessa Hegelmaier, Lena Gercke, Sara Nuru, Barbara Meier, Nadja Auermann, Claudia Ciesla, Aslı Bayram, Shermine Shahrivar, Evelyn Sharma, Victoria Jancke, Marten Laciny, Nico Schwanz and Lars Burmeister.

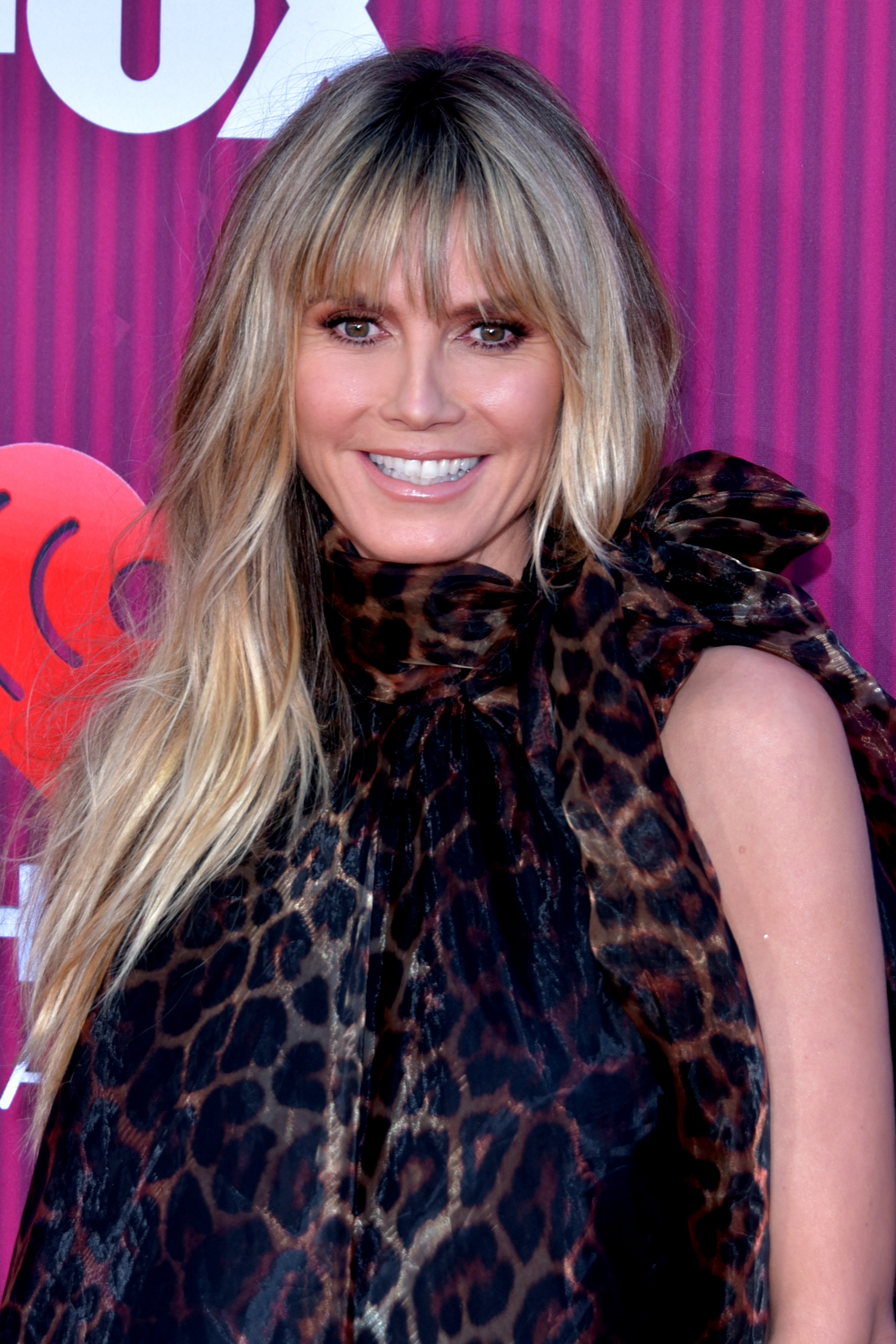
Heidi Klum

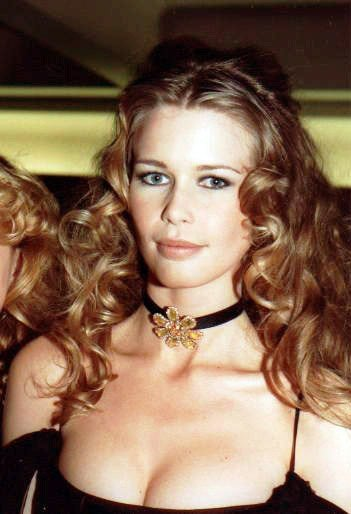
Claudia Schiffer

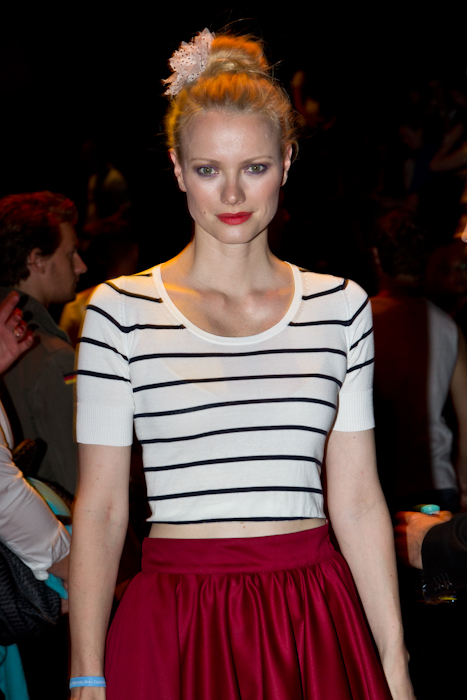
Franziska Knuppe

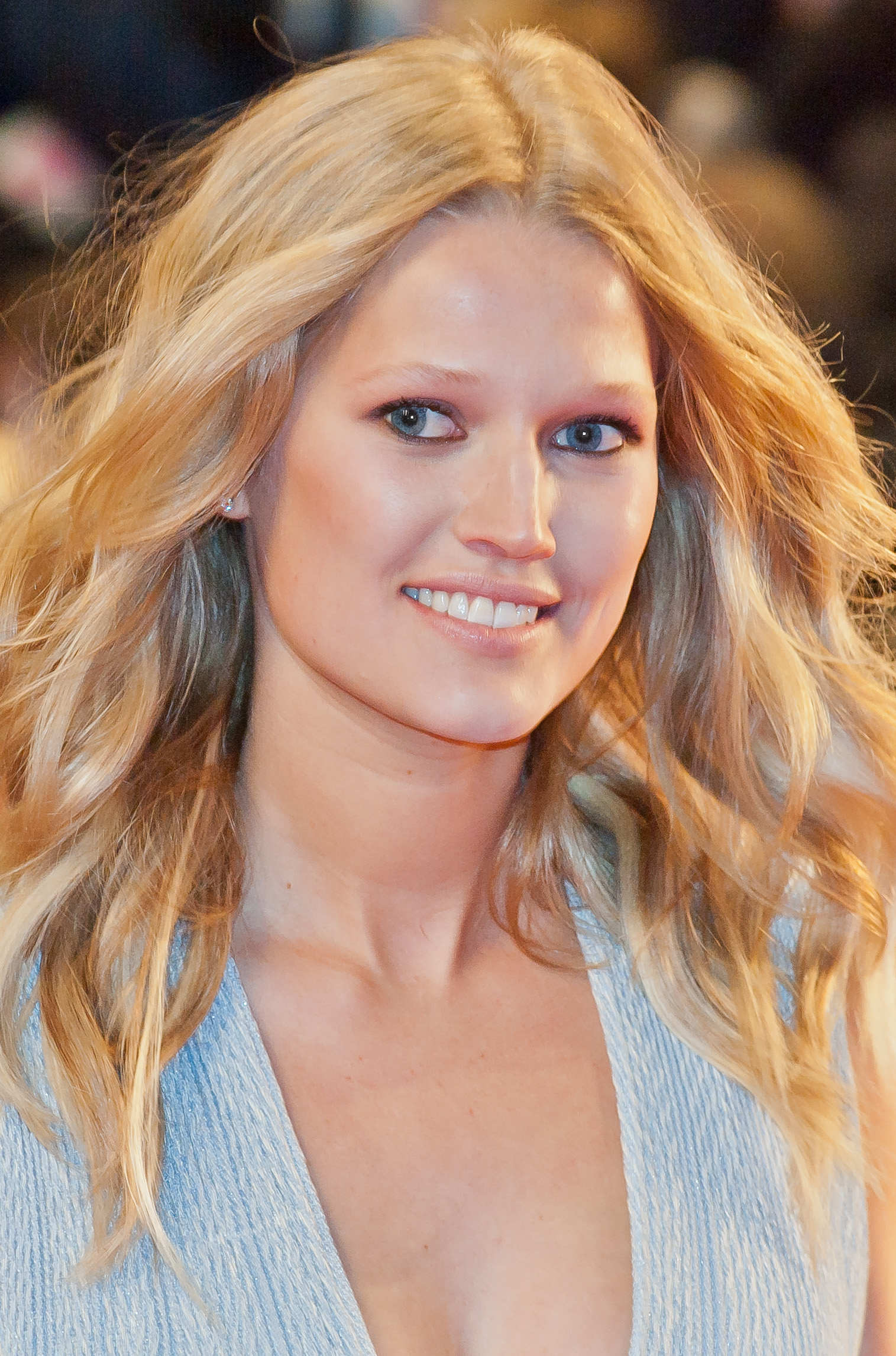
Toni Garrn

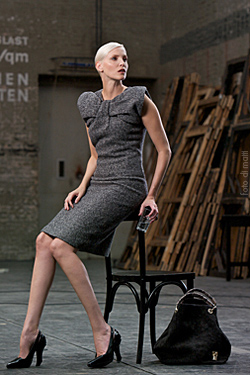
Nadja Auermann

== Education ==
Fashion education in Germany is centered on art schools, universities and the major fashion manufacturers.

Academic institutions that offer courses in fashion design include:

Multiple locations

- Berlin, Düsseldorf, Hamburg, Munich: AMD Academy of Fashion and Design
- Leipzig, Schwerin: Design Hochschule

Berlin

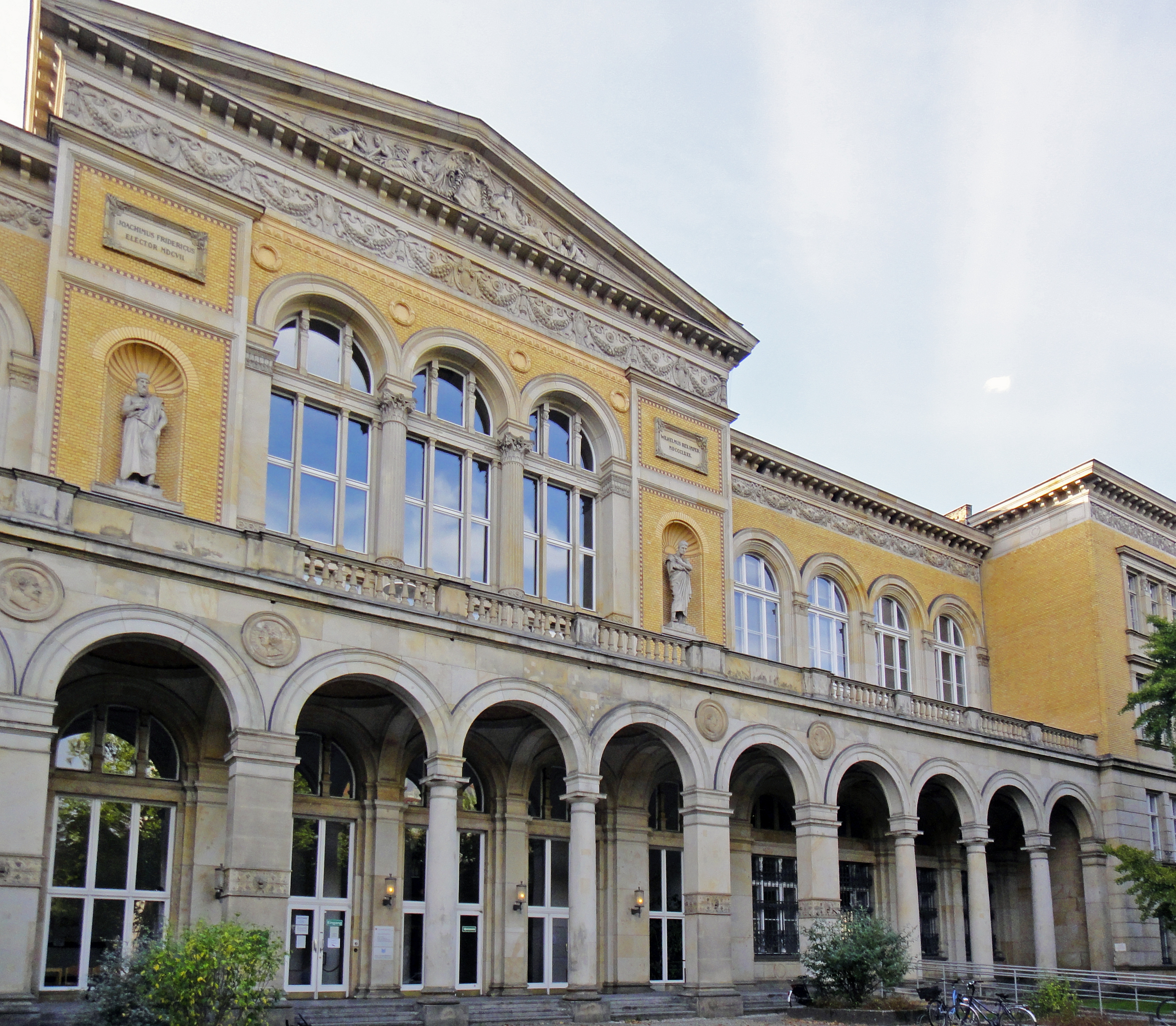
Berlin University of the Arts (UDK)

- Berlin University of the Arts
- HTW Berlin
- Lette-Verein Berlin Fashion and Design School
- Weissensee Academy of Arts
- Atelier Chardon Savard Berlin

Others

- Bremen: University of the Arts Bremen
- Düsseldorf: Kunstakademie Düsseldorf
- Halle: Giebichenstein Castle Academy of Arts
- Hamburg: HAW Hamburg
- Karlsruhe: Academy of Fine Arts
- Munich: Academy of Fine Arts
- Nuremberg: Academy of Fine Arts
