= Berlin Fashion Week =

Biannual fashion week in Berlin, Germany

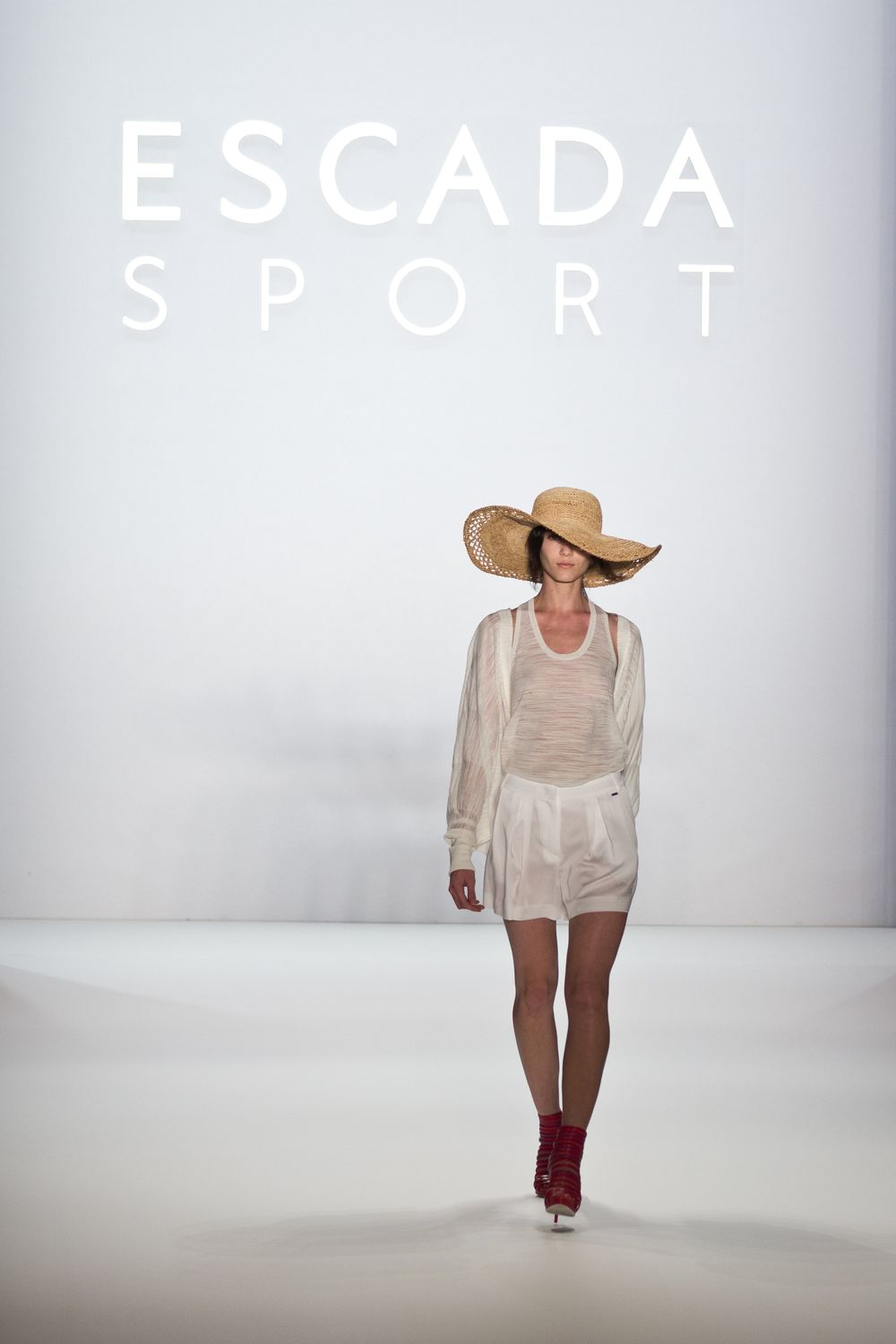
Escada Sport show opening look at Mercedes-Benz Fashion Week Berlin Season Spring/Summer 2013

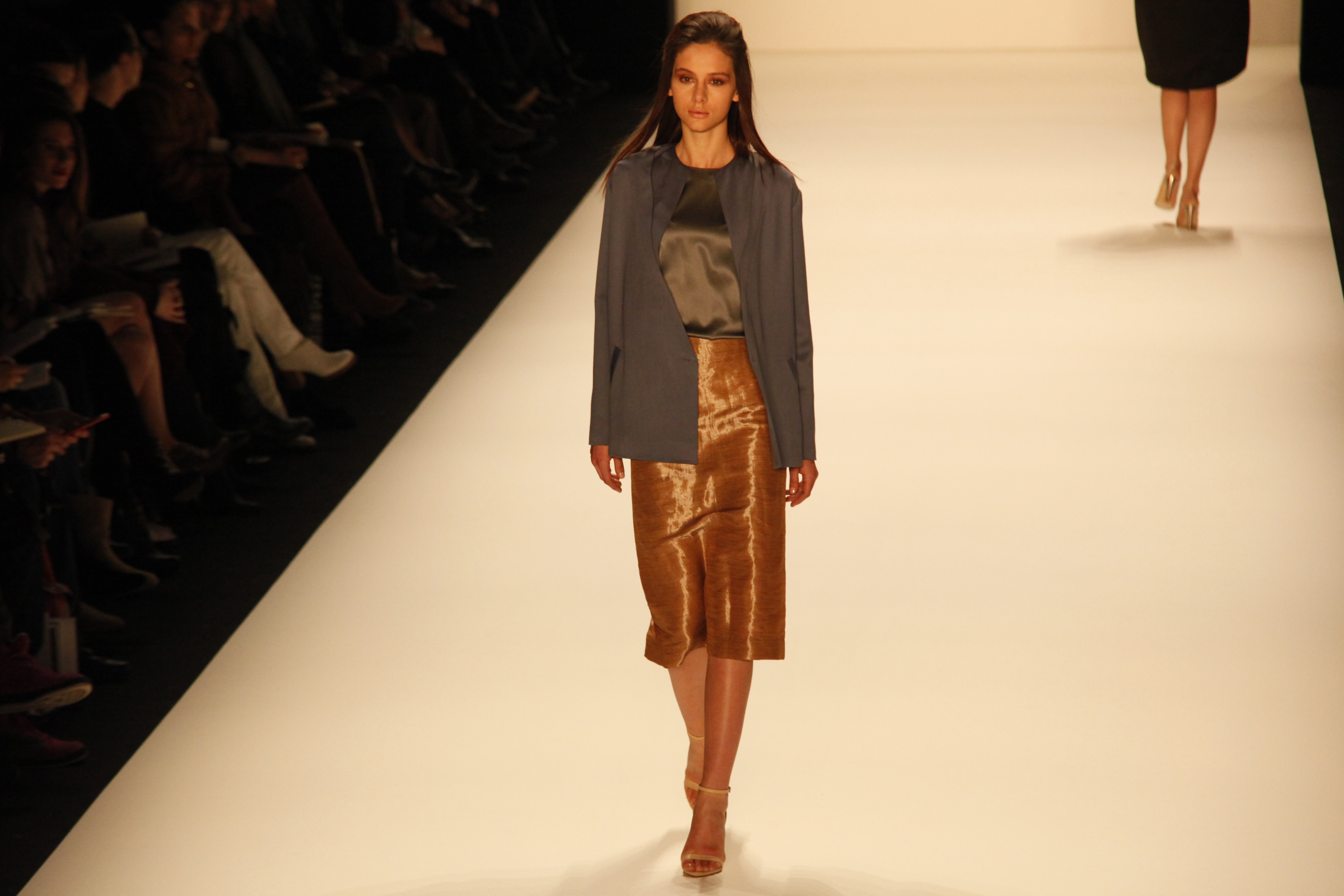
Berlin Fashion Week 2013

Berlin Fashion Week (Berliner Modewoche) is a fashion week held twice annually (in January and July) in Berlin, Germany. Since its establishment in July 2007 it has gained great international attention for its many creative young designers who are flourishing in the fashion capital of Berlin. Since July 2011, the event has taken place part in front of the Brandenburg Gate.

Mercedes-Benz is the main sponsor of the fashion week.

== Young fashion ==
Since the Spring/Summer 2012 season, Mercedes-Benz Fashion Week features young international talents in an exclusive show in cooperation with Elle. Fashion entrepreneurs can vie in the Start your Fashion Business competition. Another important event for young designers is the Designer for Tomorrow Award, which is held every summer season. A jury, which famous designer Marc Jacobs belongs to, chooses a winner who will be able to present his own show in the next winter season. Another specialty is the Berlin U-Bahn fashion show, that takes place in a chartered train of the U5 line.

== Fashion fairs ==
Different trade fairs are an essential part of the Berlin Fashion Week, such as Bread & Butter, Premium Fair, Bright Tradeshow, (capsule), Show&Order, PanoramaBerlin and The Gallery Berlin. Widely publicly available are the showfloors at Mercedes-Benz showfloor, Showfloor Berlin, Lavera Showfloor, GREENshowroom and Ethical Fashion Show.

== StyleNite ==
The StyleNite by Berlin-based designer Michael Michalsky takes place at the Berlin Fashion Show and became globally famous for its unusual performances of different art disciplines combined with state-of-the-art fashion. Musicians like Lady Gaga, Hurts, Alphaville and Icona Pop performed at StyleNites. Michalsky also chooses non-mainstream ways when it comes to selecting the models, as he also appointed disabled models like Mario Galla (with a leg prosthesis) or models aged above 60 like Eveline Hall. The famed female model Toni Garrn is part of every show.

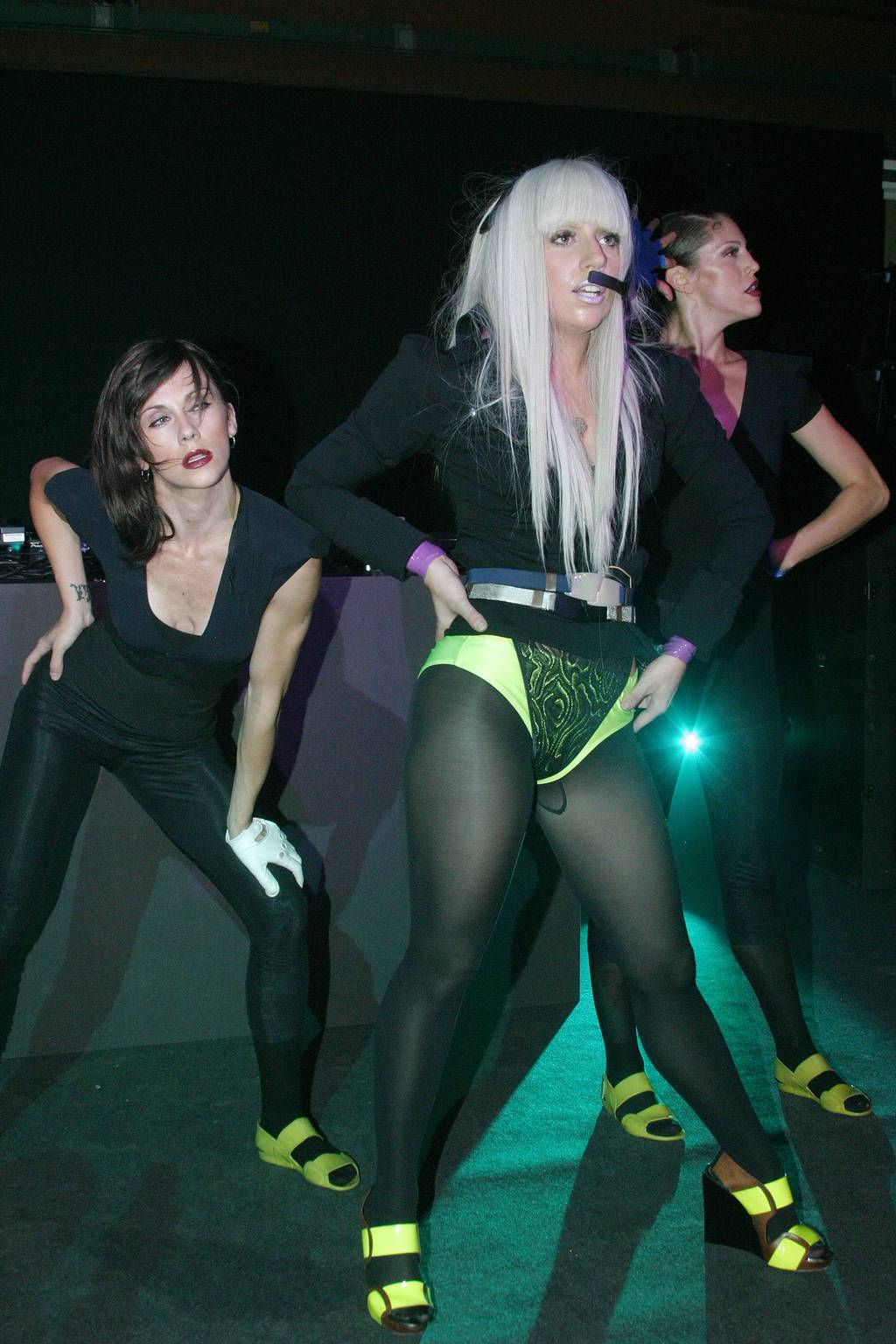
Lady Gaga at StyleNite, July 2008 (1st performance outside USA)

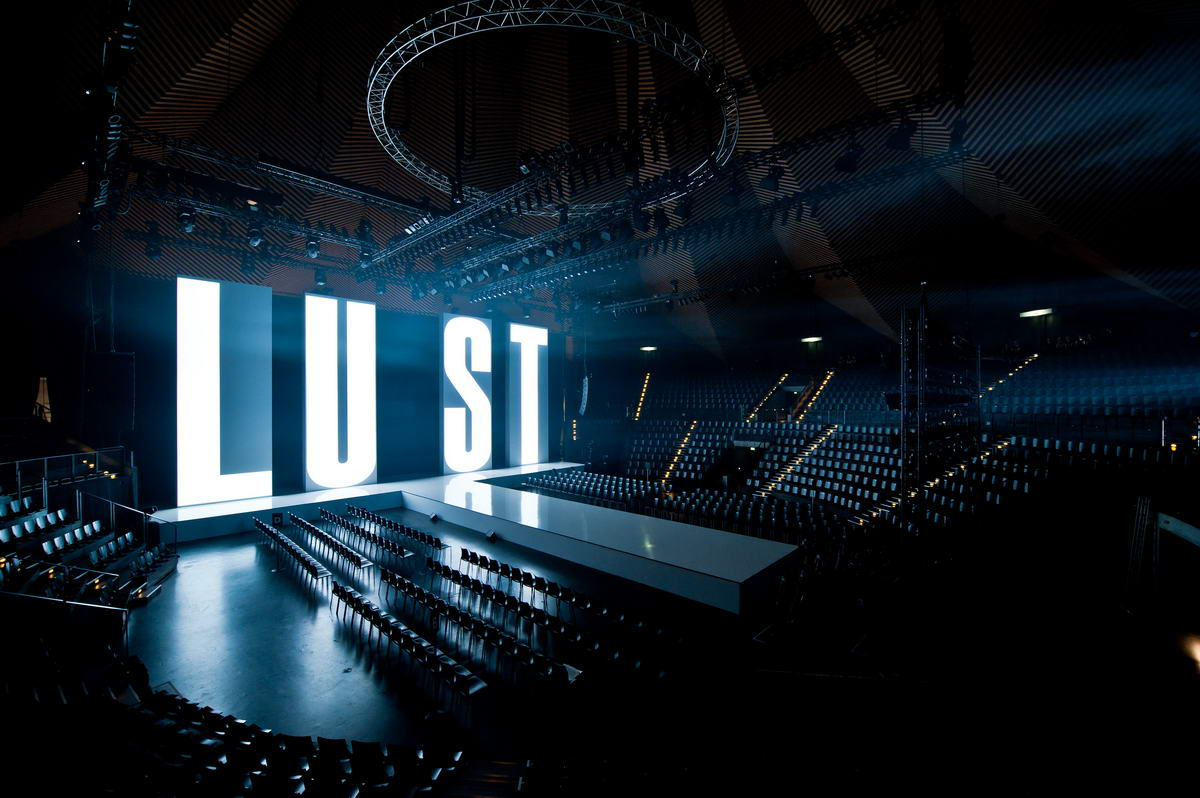
StyleNite stage in January 2012

== See also ==
- German fashion
- London Fashion Week
- Milan Fashion Week
- New York Fashion Week
- Paris Fashion Week
- Shanghai Fashion Week
- Jakarta Fashion Week
- Copenhagen Fashion Week
