= Daniel Hechter Paris =

French fashion and lifestyle brand

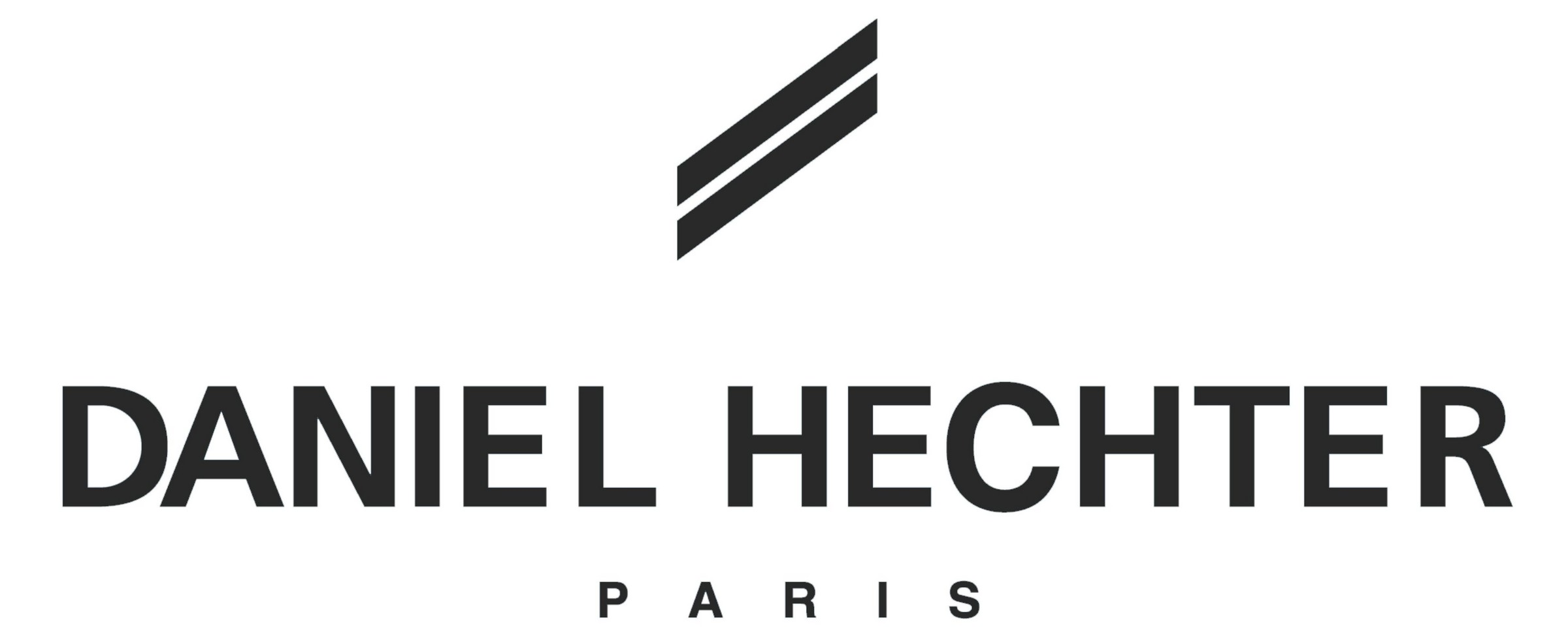
- Company type: Limited company
- Industry: Fashion
- Founded: 1962
- Headquarters: Miltenberg, Germany
- Products: High fashion, clothing and fashion accessories, shoes and consumer goods
- Revenue: € 210 million (2009)
- Website: www.danielhechter.com

Daniel Hechter Paris is a French fashion and lifestyle brand with 45 licensees worldwide. It sells men's and women's wear, accessories, and consumer goods. Since 1998, the former licensee - Otto Aurach ltd., headquartered in Miltenberg (Germany) - owns the rights for the trademark.

== History ==
In 1962, the French fashion designer Daniel Hechter published his first women's collection. Three years later, he added a children's line and completed the fashion range with the men's line in 1968. After a few years, these collections were expanded into sports, relaxation, and leisure wear. Eyewear, perfume, pens, and consumer goods followed, then watches and leather goods joined the product range. The most significant license of Daniel Hechter Paris is for shoes: Among the accessories, it generates the biggest turnover. The licensee for this segment is the German shoe manufacturer Erich Rohde ltd.

In 1998, a change of ownership was made when the former licensee Otto Aurach ltd., headquartered in the German town of Miltenberg, got the rights of the trademark. It restructured and modified the brand to advance its international development and broadened the product range: The latest licenses have been allocated for umbrellas and cufflinks. Most products are produced offshore in Asia.

== Figures and positioning ==
The biggest part of its annual turnover is generated by the fashion segments; about 90%. 80% of the fashion revenue is from men's garments, 20% is generated by the female equivalent. The remaining 10% of the total annual turnover result from the sale of accessories, among which shoes are the most significant segment. The most significant market for the brand is Europe, followed by Africa and Asia.

The brand is available in about 2,000 locations worldwide, among them are 380 Monolabel stores. Every year, two collections are published in every segment.
