= Igedo =

Igedo (Igedo Company GmbH & Co. KG) is an organiser of fashion fairs and shows established in 1949 and located in Düsseldorf, North Rhine-Westphalia, Germany. The acronym abbreviates "Interessengemeinschaft Damenoberbekleidung", in English "Community of interests for women's outerwear". Since 2004 it belongs to Messe Düsseldorf.

The former fashion fairs of the Igedo known as "Verkaufs- und Modewoche Düsseldorf", "Igedo Fashion Fairs" or "Collection premiere Düsseldorf" (CPD - 30,000 trade visitors in 2009) were at times the largest in the world. Since 2007, the Bread & Butter tradeshow in Berlin surpassed its dominance.

Igedo has branches in Moscow and Almaty.
