= Stylenite =

Cultural fashion event in Germany

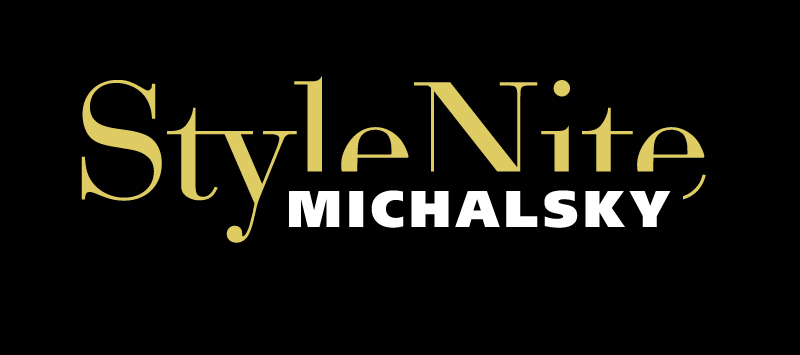
StyleNite logo

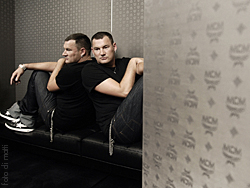
Michael Michalsky

StyleNite is a cultural event organized by Berlin's designer Michael Michalsky. It has evolved from Michalsky's fashion shows and takes place twice a year during Berlin Fashion Week. Since January 2010 the event is officially titled StyleNite.
The event is breaking with the traditions of a conventional fashion show, by combining performances of different art disciplines. Each StyleNite is themed according to the inspirational topic of the latest collection of the designer Michalsky.

== Event concept ==
Michalsky is considered a "seismograph of society" and his collections are regularly influenced by current developments in society. These topics are picked up as central theme of the StyleNite with the aim to support a free and tolerant exchange between artists and art disciplines. In this respect, the StyleNite is considered a platform for exchange, discussion and contacts. Inherent part of the StyleNite are Michalsky's fashion shows. Alternating locations and elaborate stage-designs are setting the scene for further performances during the event. Part of the program are always live music acts of famous or newcomer bands, show performances, film premieres and fashion shows of other labels. The evening ends with an excessive after show party.

In March 2011 Michalsky announced that the following four StyleNites are going to take place at the Tempodrom in Berlin.

== Overview ==
Event	Location	Theme	Music-Act	Guest label	Show act	DJ	Visitors (estimate)
Jan 2007	Rotes Rathaus	Anita Berbers Berlin				Frédéric Sanchez	300
Jul 2007	Brandenburg Gate	Bad Boy, Bad Girl				DJ Hell	300
Jan 2008	Kulturforum	Neo-Wirtschaftswunder (neo economic miracle)				Fetisch	450
Jul 2008	Uferhallen	Demo-Culture	Lady Gaga			DJ Hell	450
Jan 2009	Zionskirche (Berlin)	Sex and Religion				DJ Hell	600
Jul 2009	Friedrichstadtpalast	The Great Depression Part II				DJ Hell	2.000
Jan 2010	Friedrichstadtpalast	Zille sein Milljöh	Spandau Ballet, Hurts	Kaviar Gauche, Lala Berlin	Bella Berlin	DJ Hell	1.800 + web-live-stream
Jul 2010	Tempodrom	Endangered Species	OMD	YMA Show Couture, Maharishi	Nadja Michael	DJ Hell	1.200 + web-live-stream
Jan 2011	Tempodrom	Urban Nomads	Alphaville		Film Tron: Legacy	Tiefschwarz	1.400 + web-live-stream
Jul 2011	Tempodrom	Tolerance	Mirrors	LASCANA Beachwear	Lightperformance by Gert Hof	Tiefschwarz	1.450 + web-live-stream
Jan 2012	Tempodrom	Lust	Jessica6, Frida Gold, Marina and the Diamonds	Roeckl, C'est Tout	Broadcast on TV station ARTE	Tiefschwarz	1.350 + web-live-stream + TV broadcast
Jul 2012	Tempodrom	Personal Sunshine	Blitzkids mvt., Eklipse			Tiefschwarz	1.550 + web-live-stream
Jan 2013	Tempodrom	Broken Promises	Icona Pop, SCHMIDT		The Disney's Wizard of Oz sneak peek event	Tiefschwarz	1.500 + web-live-stream
Jul 2013	Tempodrom	Sweet Freedom	MS MR, NONONO			Tiefschwarz	1.400 + web-live-stream

== Artists, models und special features ==
=== Music acts ===
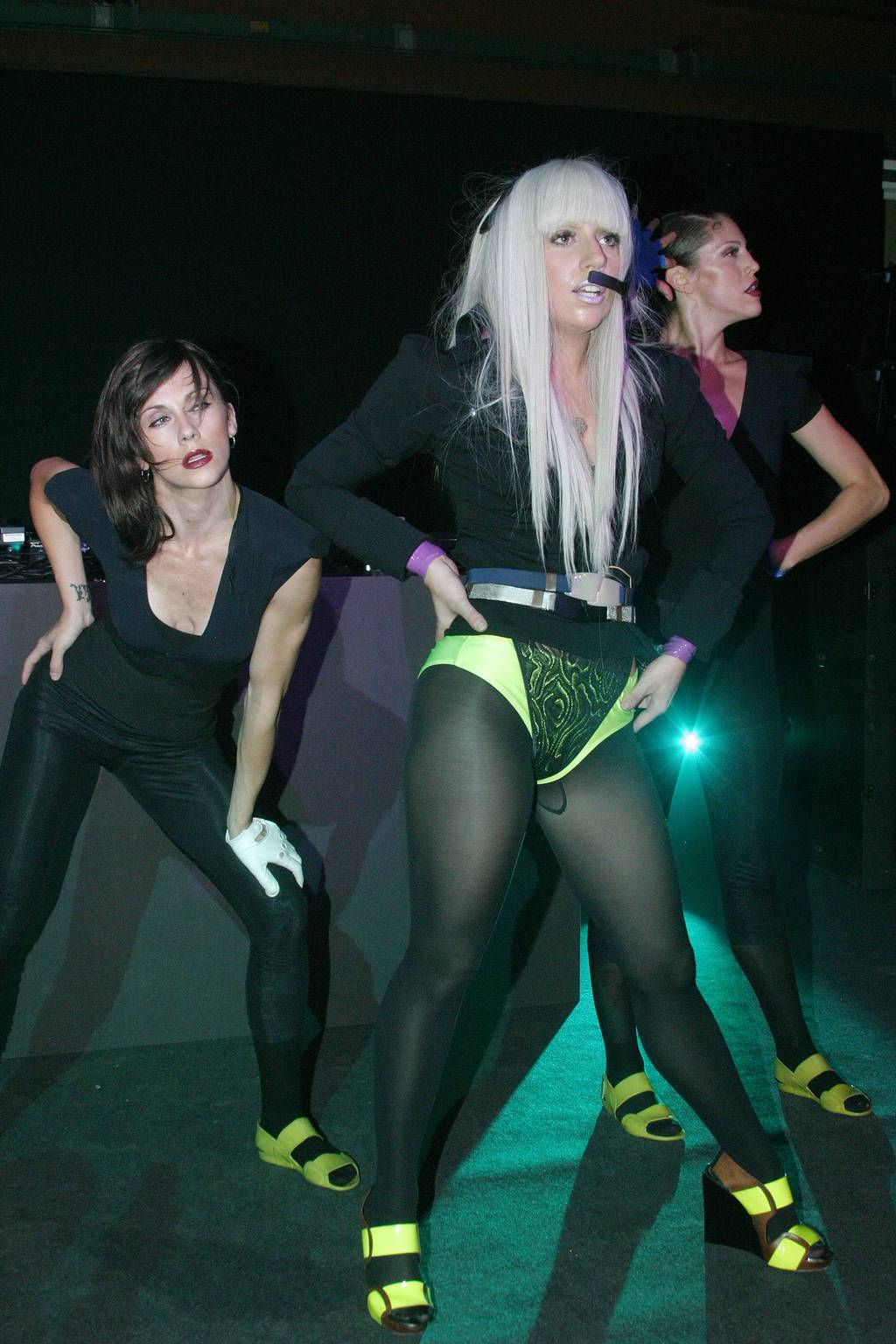
Lady Gaga, 07/2008

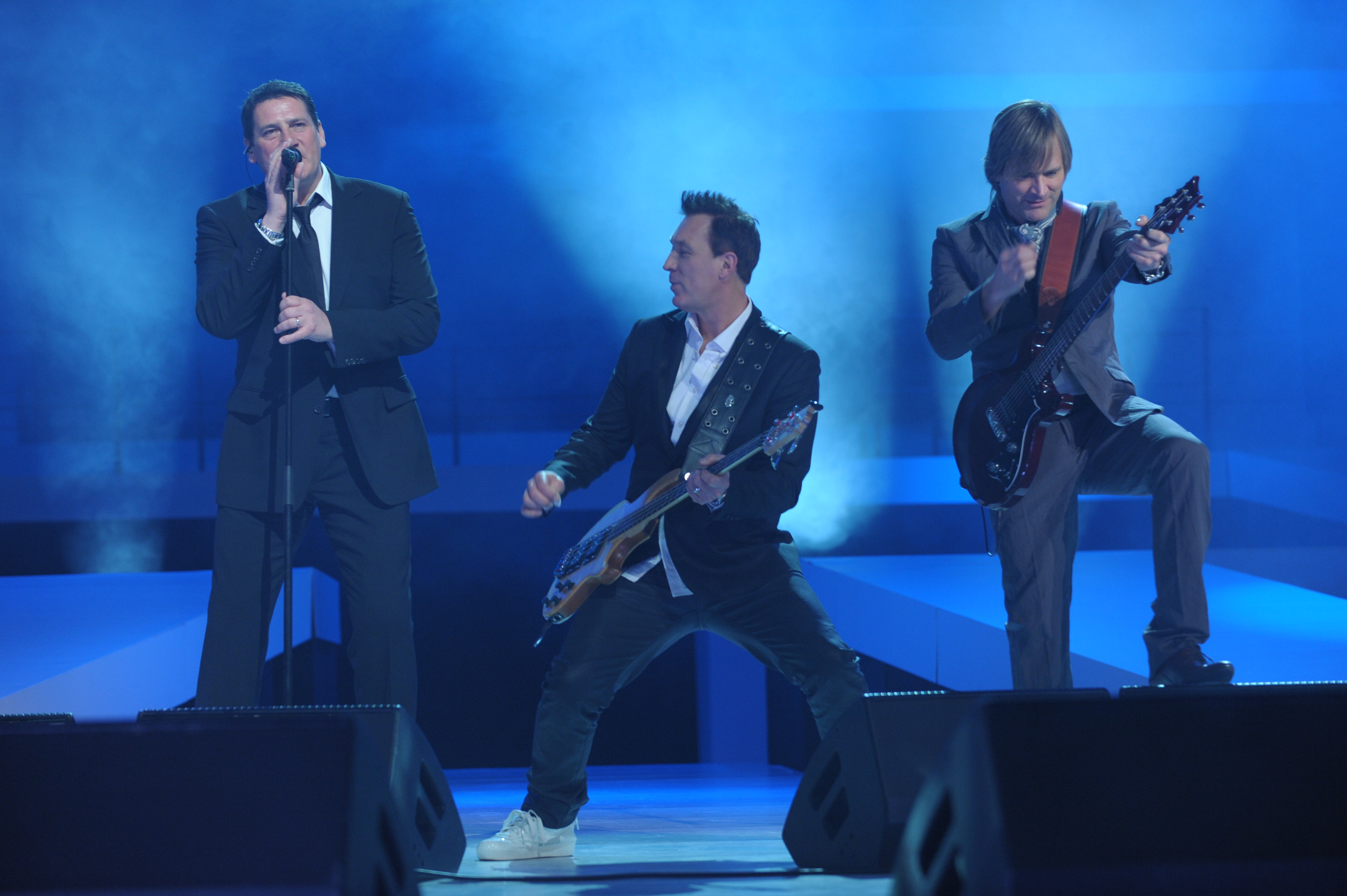
Spandau Ballet, 01/2010

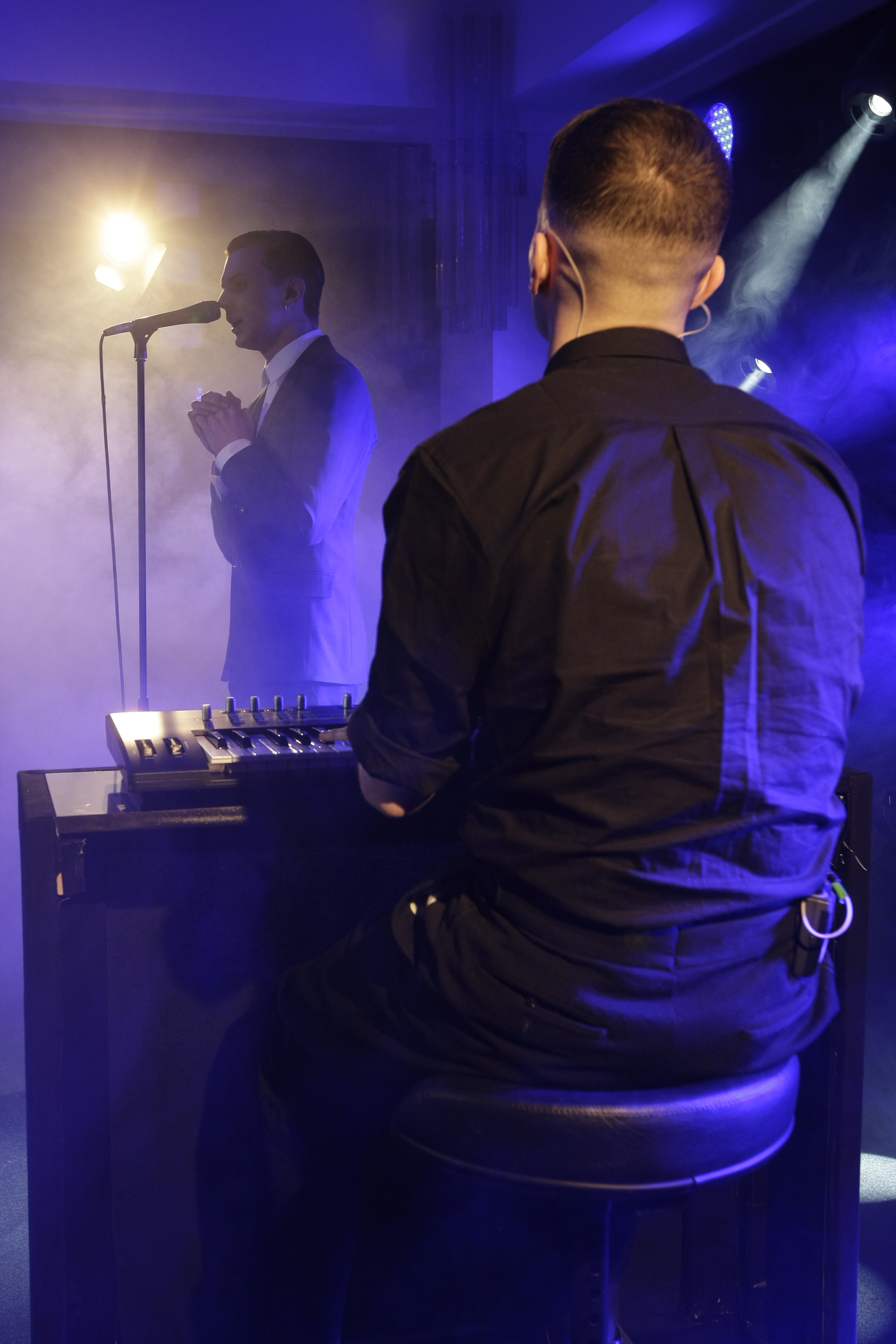
Hurts, 01/2010

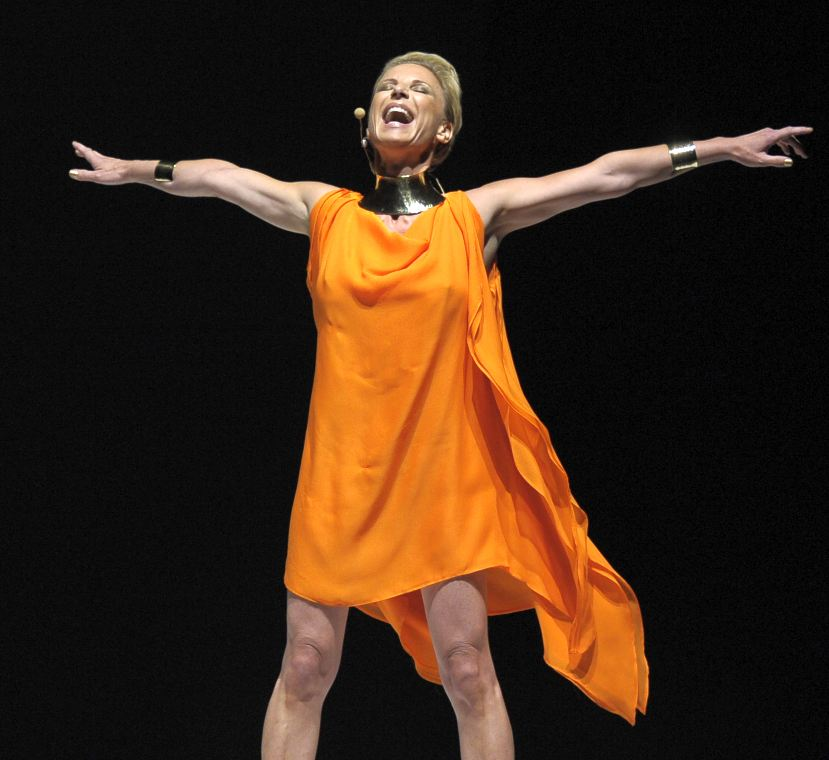
Nadja Michael, 07/2010

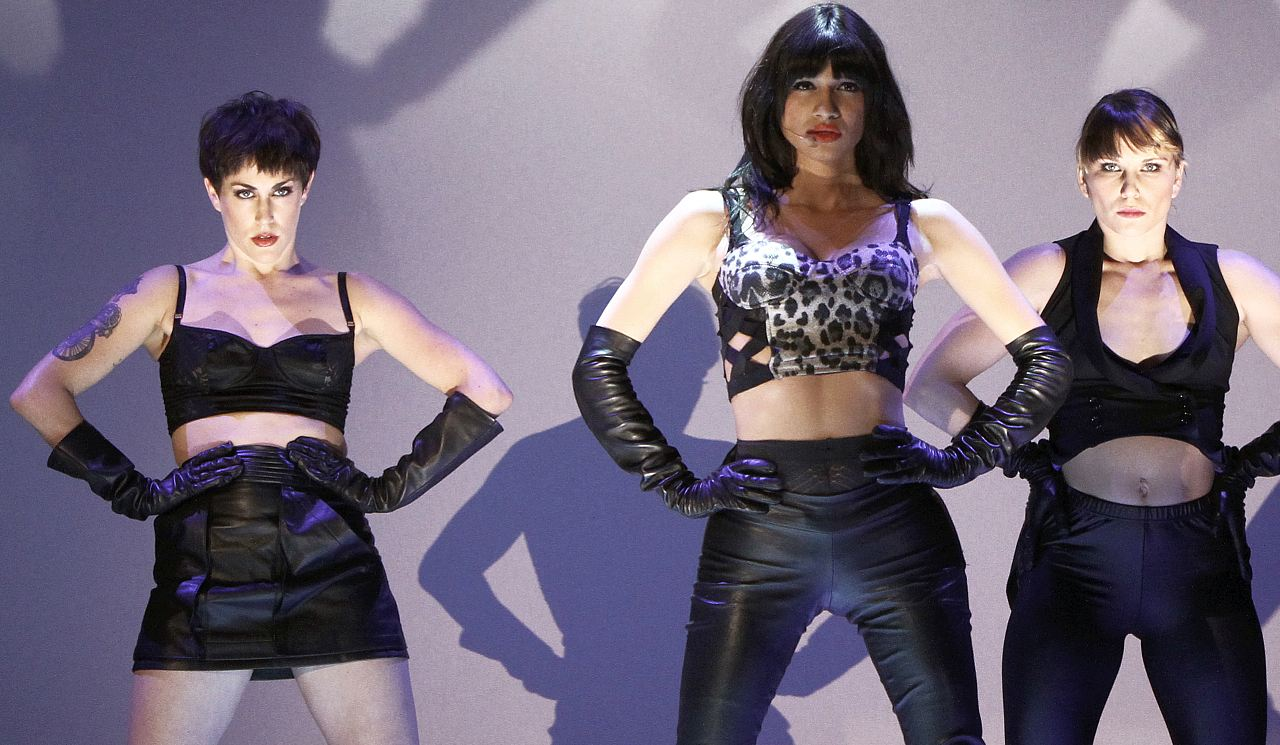
Jessica 6, 01/2012

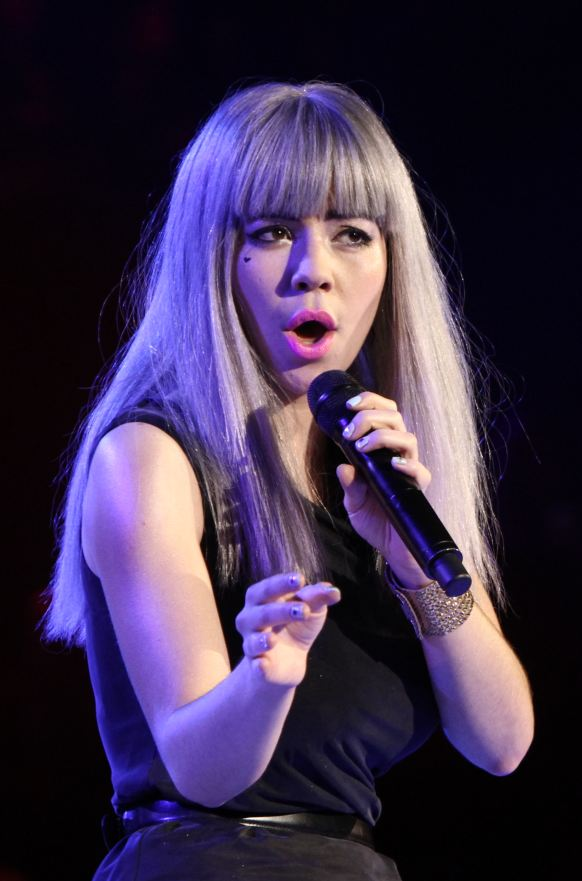
Marina and the Diamonds, 01/2012

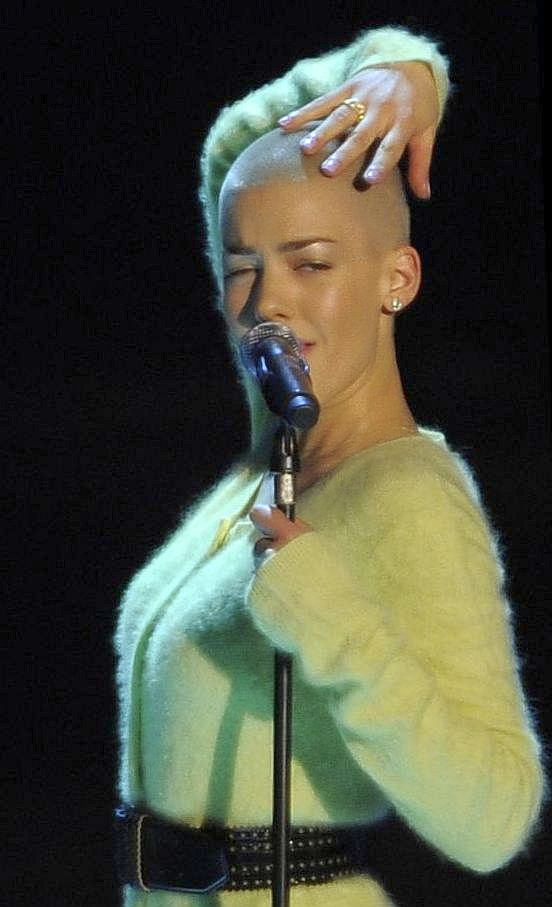
Frida Gold, 01/2012

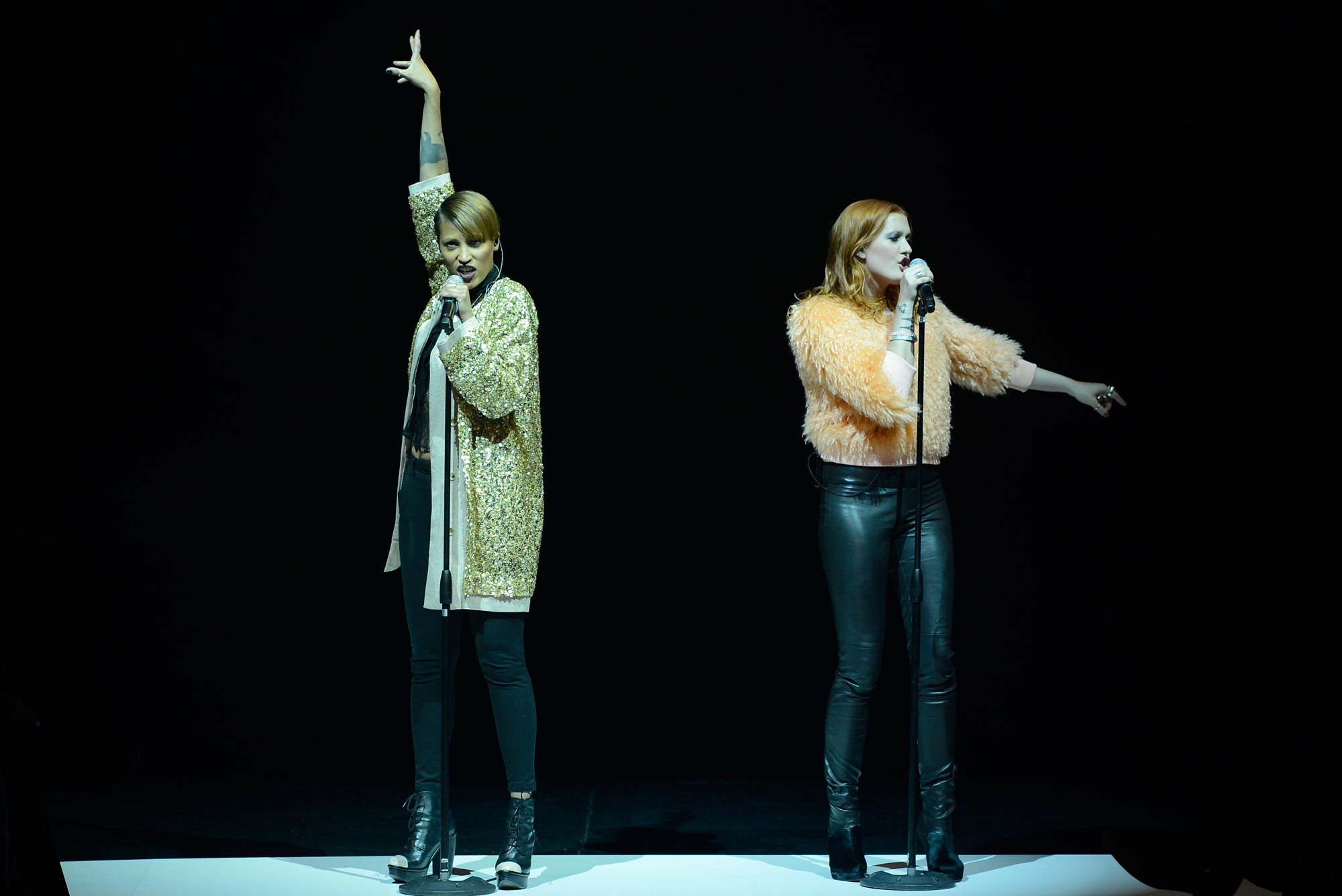
Icona Pop, 01/2013

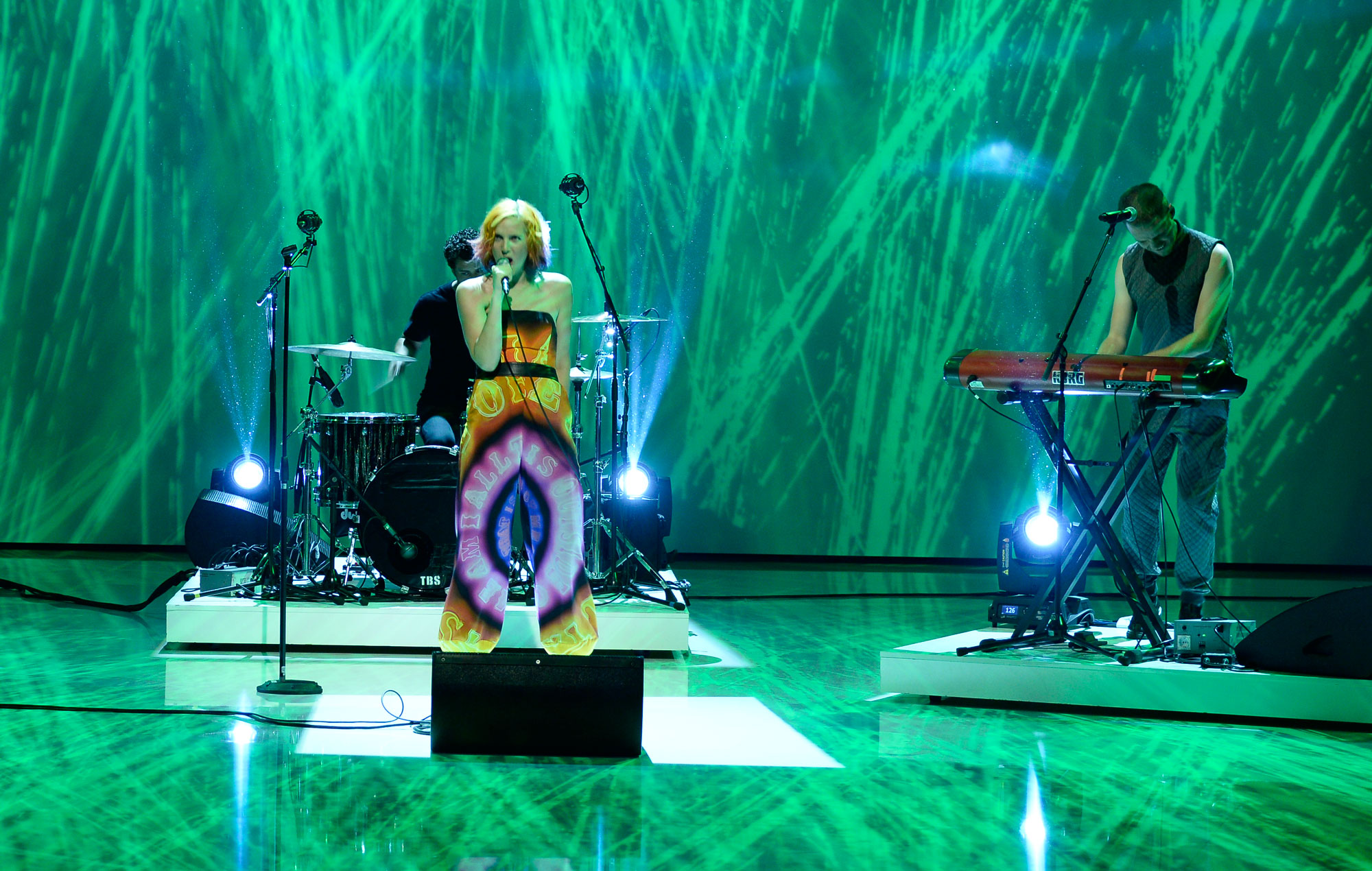
MS MR, 07/2013

=== Special features ===
- 8 July 2008: First live performance of Lady Gaga outside the USA
- 21 January 2010: World premiere of the band Hurts
- 9 July 2010: The opera singer Nadja Michael performs an aria from Médée on the catwalk
- 9 July 2010: Exclusive preview of the Friedrichstadt-Palast revue YMA
- 20 January 2011: The company DHL shoots the new TV spot for its global advertising campaign on the StyleNite catwalk
- 21 January 2011: German premiere of the Disney film Tron: Legacy
- 8 July 2011: Lightperformance by the artist Gert Hof to the song "Nothing Else Matters" by Metallica
- 25 August 2011: The art gallery Contributed dedicates an exhibition to the Michalsky StyleNite with fotos and videos by three artists
- 20 January 2012: The French-German TV station ARTE films the autumn/winter 2012 Michalsky StyleNite. The documentary is presented by Joachim Winterscheidt and broadcast on ARTE on 21 January 2012.
- 18 January 2013: The sneak peek of Disney's "The Wizard of Oz", with a presentation of three dresses inspired by the main characters of the movie

=== Stage design ===
Michalsky always develops an elaborate and individual stage for each StyleNite interpreting the theme of the evening. For example, the stage of the StyleNite The Great Depression Part II featured a crashed airplane in a pool and thousands of stocks on the catwalk.

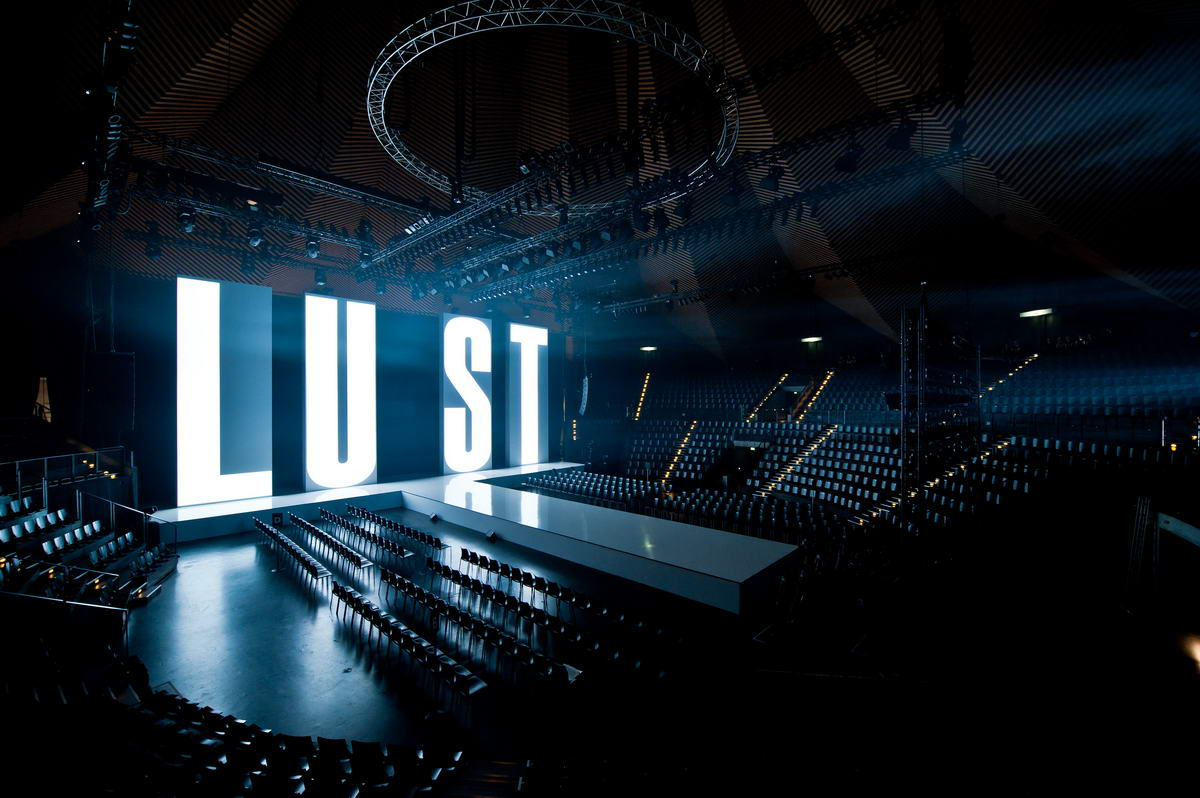
Stage, 1/2012

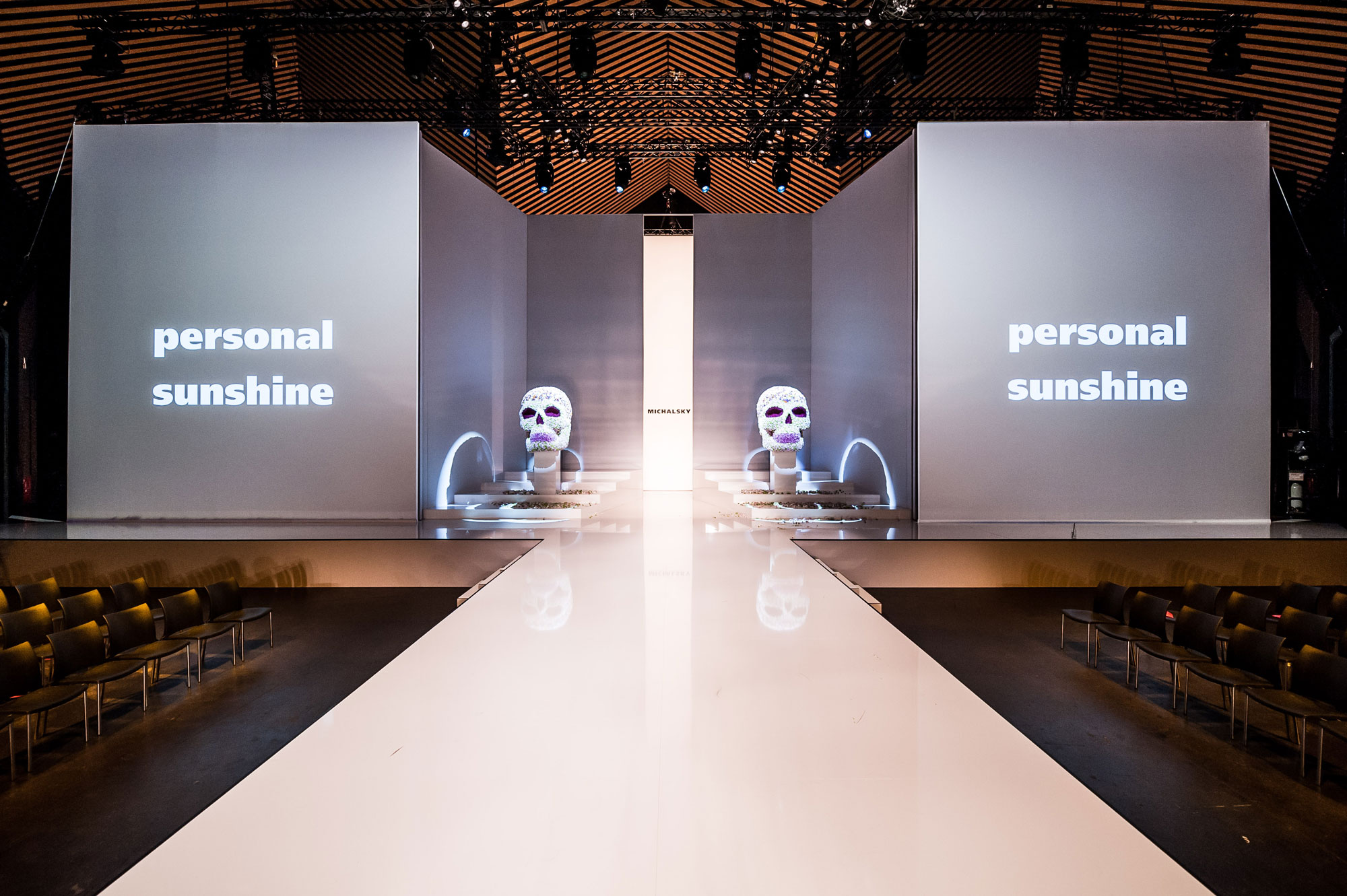
Stage, 7/2012

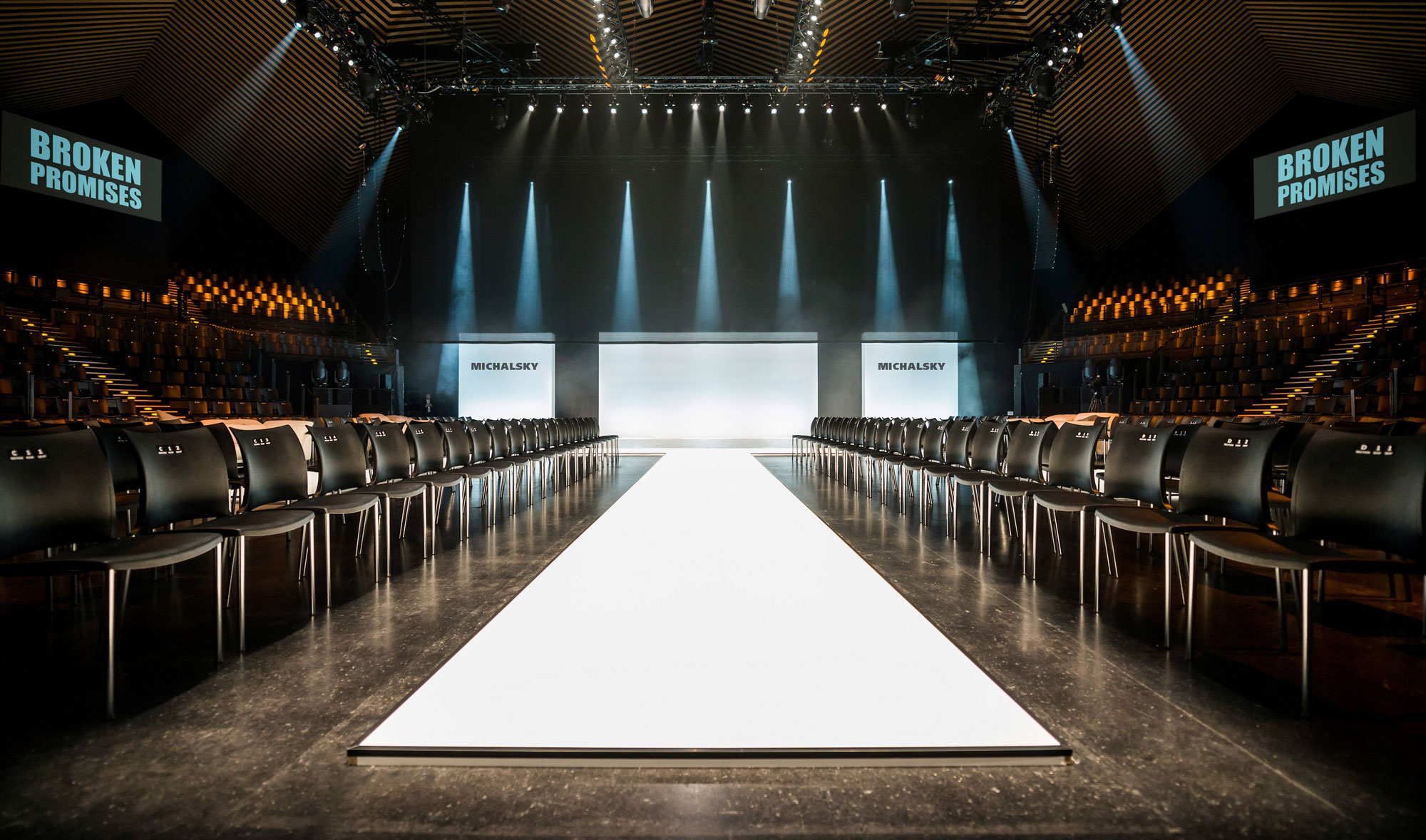
Stage, 1/2013

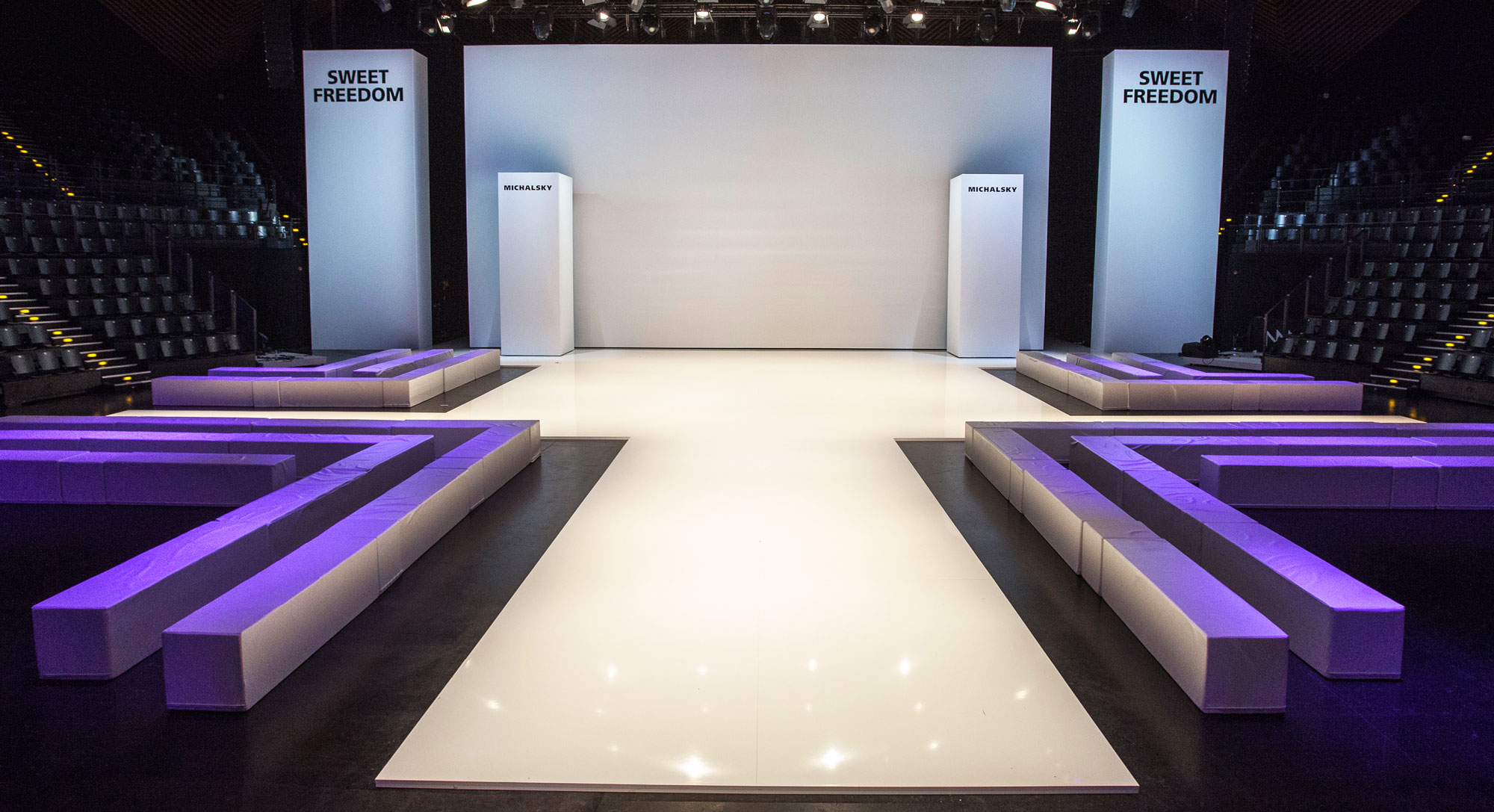
Stage, 7/2013

=== Models ===
There are frequently new models featured in StyleNite.

Michalsky has always ignored the "traditional" requirements for models regarding age, origin and perfection. He would line up handicapped models as well as aged models on the runway at StyleNite. The engagement of the handicapped model Mario Galla at the StyleNite in July 2010 was considered almost scandalous among the fashion scene and caused enormous media response. In January 2011, the models Eveline Hall and Pat Cleveland walked the runway; both women are over 60 years old. The internationally renowned German model Toni Garrn has been a regular among the models at StyleNite for several years. In January 2013 Jimi Blue Ochsenknecht was proud to present his first run on catwalk for Michael Michalsky.

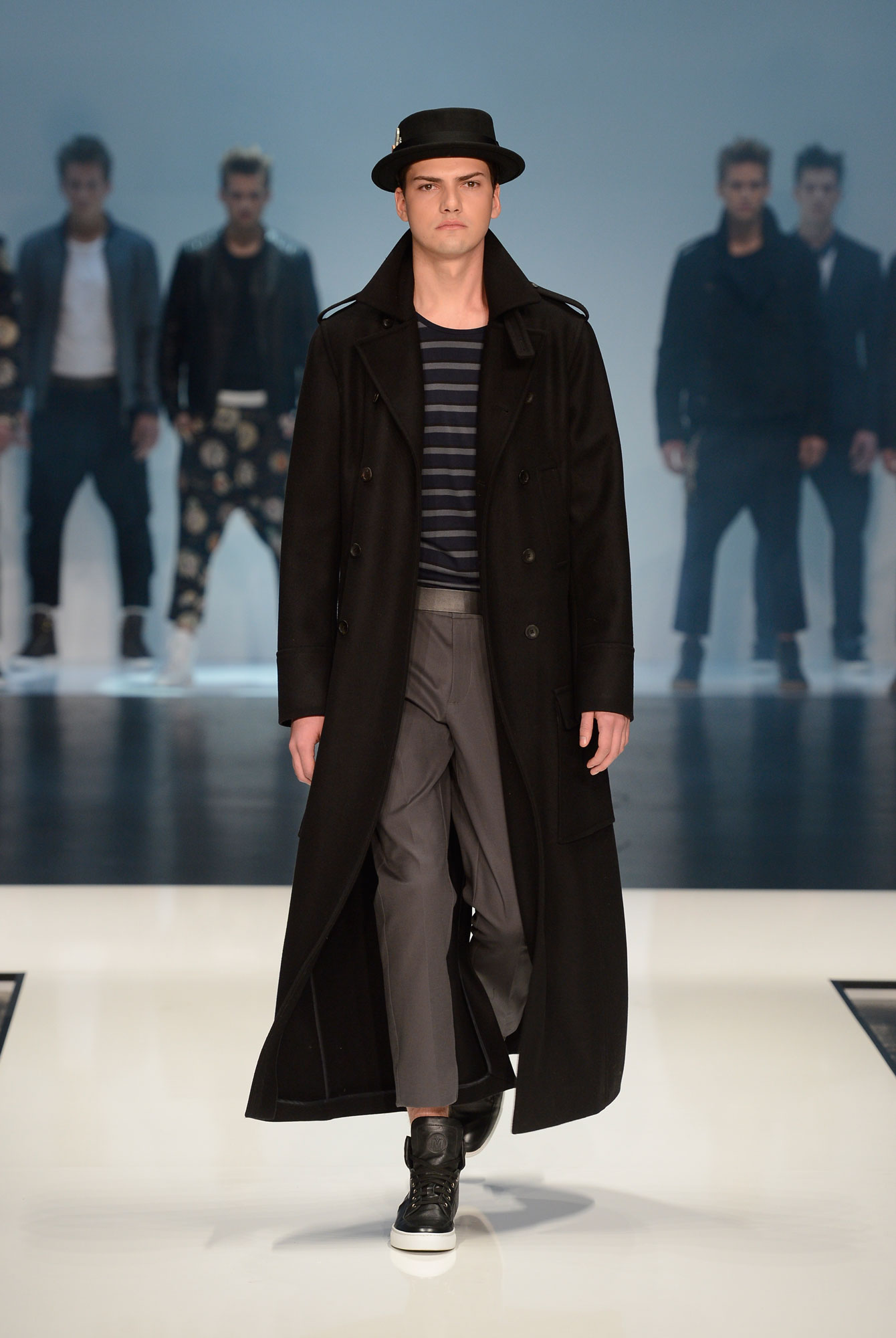
Jimi Blue Ochsenknecht

== Tickets ==
There is no official ticket sale for the event. The invitations are sent exclusively to a limited number of guests. The audience at StyleNite changes each time, consisting of people from fashion, media, politics, art and celebrities.

The organizer provides selected media - mainly fashion magazines, blogs and design journals - with a limited number of tickets that are available for raffles. In single cases tickets are given to the students of Berlin's fashion design academies.

There is a strict door policy at the night of the StyleNite. This is done because of the many features that this show has to offer. It's very exclusive since it offers the latest of the designer's collection.

== Media coverage ==
The StyleNite is extensively covered in German and international media. In July 2011 the StyleNite was covered extensively by Chinese media for the first time. Vogue TV China broadcast a report and the Cosmopolitan China dedicated an entire page to the event. On 21 January 2012 the French-German TV station ARTE aired a 90 minutes documentary on the Michalsky StyleNite.

Quotes:

- Spiegel Online: "The most daring combination at Fashion Week"
- Bild: "Mega-Event StyleNite"
- Styleranking: "StyleNite advancing to a major entertainment fashion show"
- FAZ: "Friday night was a big blast. Only (…) Boss is playing in this league."
- The New York Times: "Party Like It's 1929"
- Focus: "Fashion Week-Finale: Pastelltöne und ein schwangeres Model"
- VOGUE: "Preview Michael Michalsky"
- Manager Magazin: "Bloß nicht zu klassisch!"
