= Torsten Amft =

German fashion designer (born 1971)

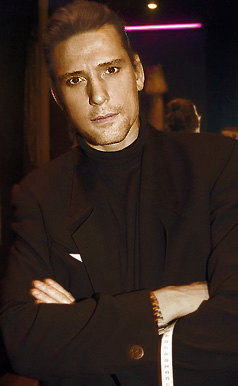
- German fashion designer & artist Torsten Amft
- Born: 14 January 1971 (age 55); Leipzig, Germany
- Labels: Torsten Amft Haute Couture; AMFT
- Awards: Lexton Fashion Award 2000 NYC

Torsten Amft (born 14 January 1971) is a German fashion designer and Creative Director of the Amft fashion labels.

== Career ==
Amft studied fashion design in Zürich, Switzerland. In 2000, Amft won the "Lexton" fashion award in New York City. Before Amft designed dresses, he was a model for Helmut Newton, Herb Ritts and Gianni Versace. Amft's single creation (Haute Couture) runs under the label Torsten Amft, while the ready-to-wear collection line runs under the label Amft fashion. The brand label AMFT is administered by international investors. For several years, Torsten Amft has been the artistic host of Europe's largest open-air fashion event, the "Global Fashion Festival".

== Philosophy ==
Twice a year, Amft organizes trend-shows for international clothing purchasers. His trend-shows during the fashion week often takes place in Berlin, to strengthen it as a fashion- and trend location. His trend collection always stands for social critique. For example, his collection premiere 2007/08 featured the slogan, "collateral climate". During his last trend-show in Spring/Summer 2008, after the G8 summit, he chose the topic Africa (African natural resources against death). The entire collection was equipped with African products. One year later, to the Berlin Fashion Week (collection premier Spring/Summer 2009, Amft presented as the first fashion designer solar clothes for external power supply, such as for mobile phones and iPods.
