= Michael Michalsky =

German fashion designer (born 1967)

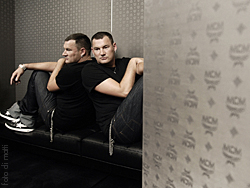
- Michalsky in 2005
- Born: 23 February 1967 (age 59); Göttingen, West Germany
- Occupations: Fashion designer, product and interior designer
- Labels: Michalsky, Lascana, Protect, MCM
- Awards: Red Dot Design Team of the Year 2005; GQ German National Designer of the Year Award 2003
- Website: michalsky.com

Michael Michalsky (born 23 February 1967) is a German fashion designer. He is the founder and head designer of the fashion label Michalsky. He is also the creative director of the luxury handbag manufacturer MCM since 2005. Besides his fashion business, Michalsky runs the agency Michalsky DesignLab, which offers design services. Today, Michalsky is considered one of Germany's most influential designers. His StyleNite at Berlin Fashion Week is followed by the global fashion scene.

== Early life and influences ==
Michalsky was born on 23 February 1967 in Göttingen and grew up in Meddewade near Bad Oldesloe where he graduated from the Theodor Mommsen secondary school in 1987. Until 1992, he studied at the London College of Fashion. After his graduation, Michalsky kept his promise to work in the hospice Lighthouse: "It was shocking, my first experience with death and AIDS. It was there that I realised: fashion, being hip and knowing famous people is completely unimportant if you don't have an emotional base".

Michalsky's main source of inspiration is music. He was heavily influenced by London's youth culture during the 1980s, when the rise of music videos and the success of MTV strengthened the link between music and fashion. Until today, Michalsky admires the 1980s pop icon Madonna: "I am a true fan of Madonna. She has inspired me with her looks and her music for almost all my life."

Besides music, Michalsky is also passionate about photography: "I collect photos of Yva, the famous fashion photographer from Berlin during the 1920s and 1930s who also taught Helmut Newton, of Edmund Kesting, Herbert List and F.C. Gundlach with his fashion portraits of the 1950s. And I am also fascinated by architecture."

== Career ==
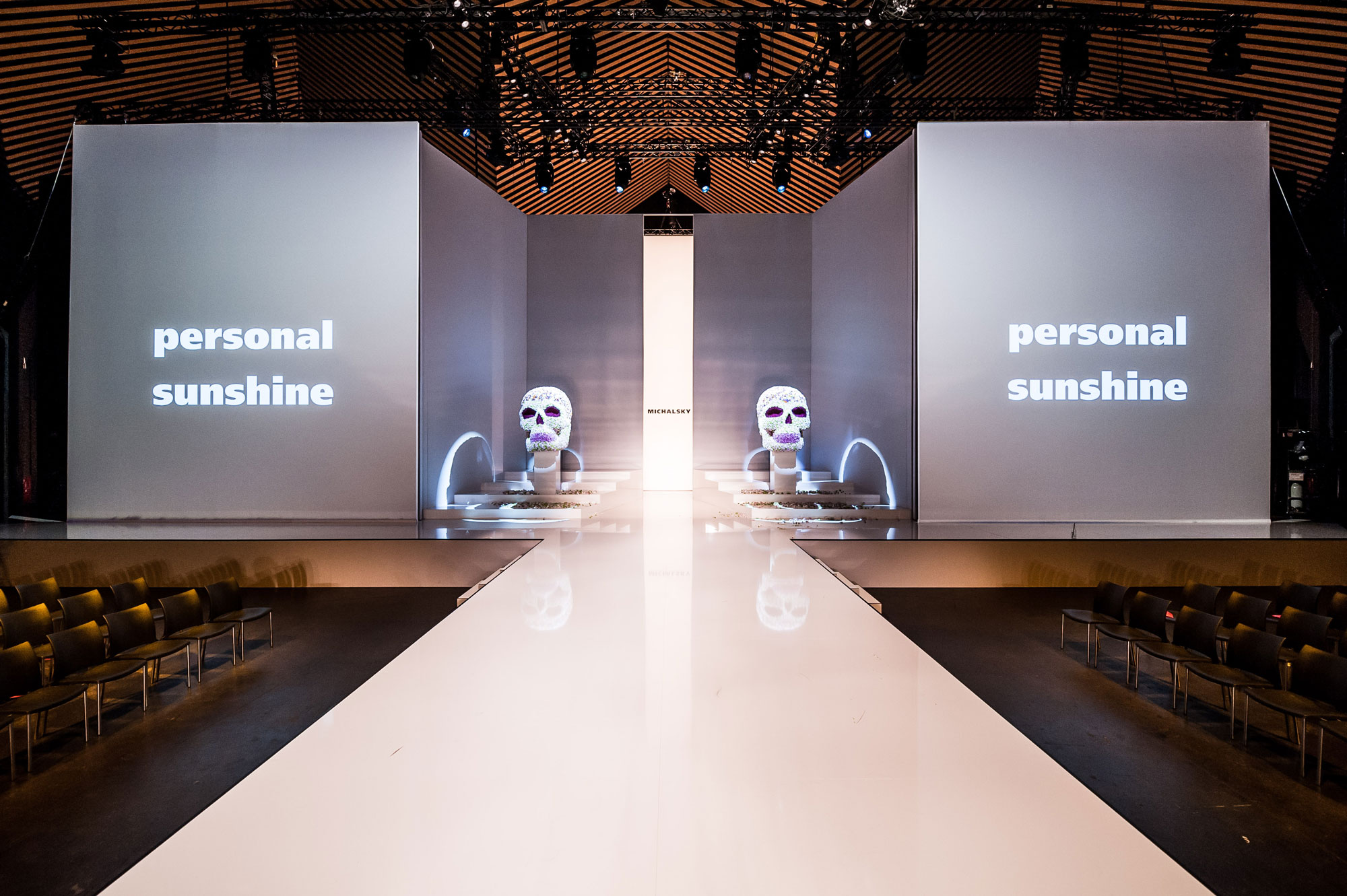
A catwalk design for the Michalsky StyleNite at Berlin Fashion Week

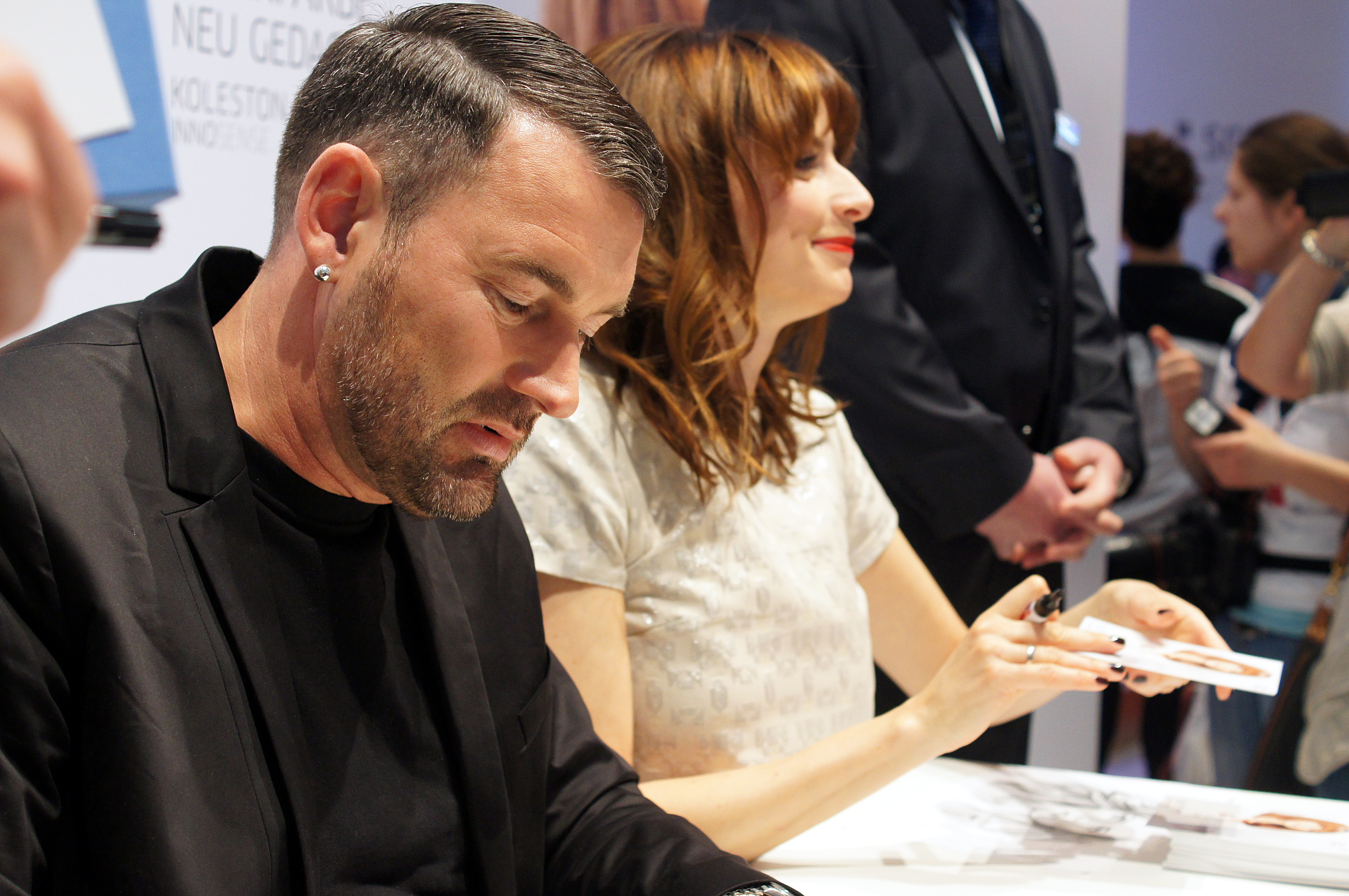
Michalsky and German fashion model Eva Padberg at Frankfurt Hair and Beauty show, 2014

After university, Michalsky started his career as design manager at Levi Strauss & Co. in Germany. From 1995 until early 2006, he worked at adidas AG where he held the position as Global Creative Director for six years. During this time, Michalsky initiated and developed cooperations and product lines with the fashion designers Yohji Yamamoto and Stella McCartney as well as with rap musician Missy Elliott. He was also responsible for the re-launch of older adidas products in a "Retro-look".

In May 2005, Michalsky was approached by the Korean luxury group Sungjoo with the task to revive the tarnished fashion brand MCM. He holds the position as creative director at the luxury goods brand with German heritage until today.

In 2006, Michalsky founded fashion and lifestyle company Michalsky Holding GmbH in Berlin. In January 2007, he launched his first fashion show in the city hall Rotes Rathaus.

In 2014, Michalsky appeared on America's Next Top Model; he became the director when cycle 21 of ANTM models did a MCM bags photoshoot in Seoul City Hall.

The designer presents the latest collection of his label Michalsky twice a year during Mercedes Benz Berlin Fashion Week.

Besides working for his own label and the brand MCM, Michalsky also designs sportswear collections for the company Kappa China since 2009. Kappa China belongs to the Chinese sporting goods group Dongxiang.

On July 5, 2021, the television station RTL announced that Michalsky would be part of the jury for Das Supertalent in 2021 alongside Lukas Podolski and Chantal Janzen.

== Awards and honors ==
- 2003 "National Designer of the Year" awarded by GQ Germany
- 2004 "Sportstyle Designer of the Year" awarded by the ISPO VISION
- 2005 Red Dot Design Team of the Year together with his adidas-designteam
- 2006 Featured in the exhibition "100 Heads of Tomorrow" (German: 100 Köpfe von Morgen) which was commissioned by the government initiative "Germany – Land of Ideas" (German: Deutschland – Land der Ideen)

== Fashion ==
Michalsky's fashion range is broad and diverse as he creates fashion for various segments: premium apparel, sportswear, bags and accessories. His own collection Michalsky belongs to the high fashion segment and combines classic styles with streetwear influences. Michalsky sees himself not as an artist, but as a lifestyle designer. With his designs, he wants to address a wide range of people and encourage a joyful approach to fashion. This mindset is expressed in the claim "Real Clothes for Real People".

Overview of current design works:

Label	Period	Collections	Description
MCM	since 2005	Bags and accessories (Spring/Summer and Autumn/Winter)	Luxury accessories for women
Michalsky	since 2007	Women, men, accessories (Spring/Summer and Autumn/Winter)	High fashion
Kappa China	since 2009	Various sportswear collections (Spring/Summer and Autumn/Winter)	Sportswear and streetwear
Protect	since 2010	Collection in cooperation with the WWF Germany (Spring/Summer and Autumn/Winter)	T-shirts and basics
Lascana	since 2012	Women's beachwear (One collection per year)	Beachwear and swimwear

== Michalsky DesignLab ==
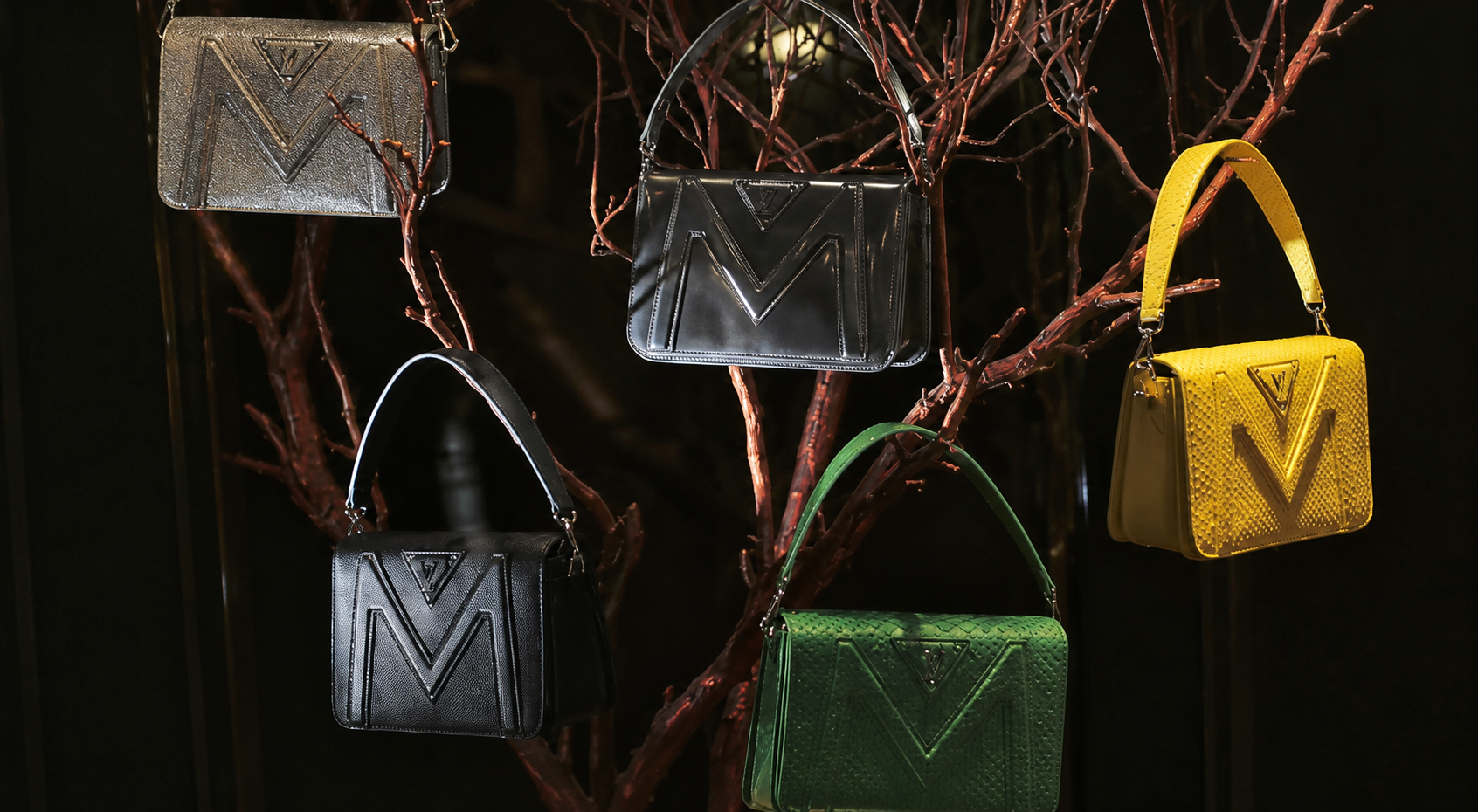
Bags inspired in Madonna by Michalsky

In 2009, Michalsky founded the agency Michalsky Designlab in 2009, offering design services in the areas of product and interior design.

Work examples of Michalsky DesignLab:

- 2009: Summer Mobile Collection 2009 for Sony
- 2009: Leather collection for the world premiere of the concept car BMW Vision EfficientDynamics, presented during IAA
- 2010: 500 costumes for the revue show YMA at Friedrichstadt-Palast in Berlin
- 2010: Design of the product packaging of the laundry detergent Ariel
- 2011: Design of the Catwalk-Bar in Berlin's Marriott Hotel at Potsdamer Platz, Germany's first fashion bar
- 2012: Product Design for Spreequell – Michael Michalsky created an exclusive, elegant bottle design – Q Spreequell Premium

== Licences ==
=== Perfume ===
In September 2010, Michalsky presented his first two fragrances, Michalsky for Men and Michalsky for Women. The perfume was created in cooperation with the fragrance house Mäurer & Wirtz. The launch of the perfume was accompanied by an advertising campaign which caused a sensation in public due to its erotic character. The campaign theme pictures a man and a woman in a highly provocative position.

In September 2011, the second perfume series Michalsky Urban Nomads for men and women was launched. The theme corresponds to the inspiration of the Michalsky Fall/Winter 2011 collection.

=== Eyewear ===
Since 2008, the Michalsky eyewear collection is produced and marketed by the company Nigura Metzler. The collection consists of sunglasses, correctional frames and a limited edition. The latest eyewear collection is presented bi-annually at the Michalsky fashion show.

=== Living Collection ===
In October 2012, Michalsky presented his first METROPOLIS by MICHALSKY LIVING Sofa Collection produced and marketed by the company Polipol. Actually he has expanded his successful LIVING Collection with wallpapers by A.S. Création and carpets by Reinkemeier Rietberg – out at the stores in fall 2013

== Michalsky Stylenite ==
The Michalsky fashion shows gradually evolved to the Stylenite, a cultural event organised by the designer taking place twice a year during Berlin Fashion Week. Besides the women and men fashion shows, the event schedule includes performances in the areas of music, film and art. Among the artists who have performed at previous StyleNites were: Lady Gaga, Spandau Ballet, Hurts, Mirrors, OMD, Nadja Michael, Alphaville, Icona Pop, MS MR.
