= Lars Burmeister =

German male model

- Born: Lars Burmeister; 26 April 1984 (age 42); Hamburg, West Germany
- Modelling information
- Height: 1.86 m (6 ft 1 in)
- Hair colour: Dark blonde
- Eye colour: Blue
- Website: www.larsburmeister.com

Lars Burmeister (born 26 April 1984, in Hamburg, West Germany), is a German male model.

== Career ==
Burmeister started his modeling career at the age of 23. He has appeared on numerous magazine covers including V Man, Euroman and Vogue. Burmeister's appearance in print campaigns include Louis Vuitton, Hugo Boss, Dolce & Gabbana, Versace, Valentino SpA, Armani, Michael Kors, Zara, Bottega Veneta, Etro, Roberto Cavalli, Iceberg and Missoni.

Craig McDean recruited him in 2004 as the spokes model for Hugo Boss, and he has since appeared in Vogue, GQ, and Cosmopolitan.

He was later ranked No. 34 in MaleIconic's The 100 Greatest Male Models of All Time and No. 35 by the Male Model Index, where he was placed in Tier 3 ("Global Commercial Anchors").
