= Rohde Shoes =

Erich Rohde GmbH (ltd.)
- Genre: Shoe manufacturing
- Headquarters: Schwalmstadt, Germany
- Number of locations: 3200 trade partners in 18 countries, 2 Outlet stores
- Area served: Europe
- Key people: Stephan Harmening, Oliver Kraxner
- Products: shoes
- Operating income: 80 million € (2008)
- Number of employees: 400

Erich Rohde GmbH is a German shoe manufacturer headquartered in Schwalmstadt (Hesse). It is the licence holder of the French lifestyle brand Daniel Hechter and its primary field of business is the European shoe market.

== Background ==
With the foundation of a tannery in the German town of Guben (Brandenburg) in 1862, the company's history begins. Throughout the years, a shoe factory emerged from this tannery, which company founder Erich Rohde overtook in 1926 and finally turned into a production plant. Acting in the legal form of a limited partnership, the Erich Rohde KG started expanding in the 1960s and founded subsidiaries in Austria and Germany as well as production plants in Portugal and Eastern Europe.

Through the integration of modern computer technologies, the company enhanced its equipment and thus accelerated the production processes due to actual market development. In 1996, the Erich Rohde GmbH got the license for producing and selling the shoe collection of the French lifestyle brand Daniel Hechter and thus broadened its offerings. In 2008, the company was restructured and turned into a limited company which is headed by the CEOs Dr. Stephan Harmening and Oliver Kraxner.

== Company structure ==
The company has 300 employees in Germany and another 100 in five European and one Canadian subsidiary. Rohde had an annual selling rate of about 80 million Euros in 2008 and produces 20,000 pairs of shoes per day. The overwhelming majority of the turnover is generated in the segment of slippers, in which the company presents itself as market leader. Erich Rohde GmbH has 3,200 trading partners in Europe and two outlet stores, one at its headquarters in Schwalmstadt and another one in the German town of Borken (Hesse). In addition, 520 trading partners offer the shoe collection of Daniel Hechter.

== Products ==
The company presents itself as a family brand that offers comfortable, high- quality shoes for every age group. Consequently, its collections consist of models for men, women and children and include casual, business and evening shoes as well as sandals and slippers. Erich Rohde GmbH has an own creative centre at its headquarters where all models of the company's two brands are designs and distributed via a dispatch centre. Every year, the company introduces two new collections and presents them on the international shoe fair GDS in Düsseldorf.
