= Bread & Butter (tradeshow) =

Fashion and music event in Berlin, Germany

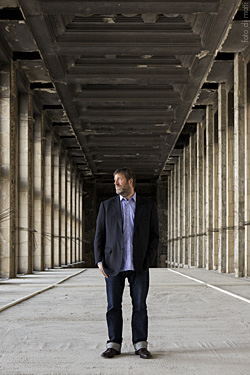
Karl-Heinz Müller, initiator of B&B, at Berlin Tempelhof Airport, the location of the fashion show from 2009 to 2015

Bread & Butter was an annual Berlin-based event and a year-round online shopping hub by Zalando.

The company offers access to pre-launches and rare items, with a particular focus on streetwear and sneakers. Brands including Vans, Adidas, Eastpak, Nike, and others have created unique products specifically for release at Bread & Butter.

The last Bread & Butter weekend took place at Arena Berlin from August 31- September 2, 2018, with the tagline, "The Pop-Up of Style and Culture" and a "see now, buy now" concept. The three-day weekend showcased fashion, culture, and music, and attracted around 35,000 visitors.

International music artists performed live each evening at the venue, as well as DJ sets scheduled on different stages throughout the day. The weekend drew influencers and celebrities from around the world to Berlin to take part in various activities as well as in live panel discussions on current cultural topics.

Pop-up fashion shows were a key highlight during the weekend, showing new season collections and limited edition products from a selection of brands. A variety of food stalls were set up across Arena and the surrounding areas, offering popular street food dishes and drinks to guests.

== History ==
The original "Bread & Butter" tradeshow was founded by German entrepreneur Karl-Heinz Müller together with Christian Geyr and Wolfgang Ahlers and premiered in July 2001 in Cologne-Deutz. It was initially conceived of as a bi-annual fashion industry trade show "for the progressive, contemporary clothing culture". It had a spin-off in Barcelona in 2005 and completely relocated there in 2007. The tradeshow came back to Berlin in the summer of 2009 and relocated to the historical hangars of Tempelhof Airport.

In June 2015, the trade fair was acquired by Berlin-based fashion and tech company Zalando. The e-commerce platform relaunched it in 2016, turning the fashion industry event into a weekend open to the public. It hosts pop-up stands from the brands available on zalando.com, with the aim to "democratize fashion".

Past music lineups have included various international headliners such as A$AP Rocky, M.I.A and FKA twigs, as well as supporting local DJs from Berlin. Each day of the event culminates in an after-party at the venue.

The 2017 fashion shows included collections from HUGO, Topshop and G-Star, as well as a retrospective show by couture designers Viktor & Rolf. The same year, Vivienne Westwood opened an onsite exhibition dedicated to her work, as well as hosting an inspirational talk on stage at Festsaal.

2017 also saw several panel discussions with a variety of topics. Adwoa Aboah hosted an empowering Girl's Talk session and Wyclef Jean told his life story during an intimate live discussion.

2018 edition focused on fashion accessories, music, and other consumer electronics.

After the 2018 event, Zalando announced that they will discontinue the event, because "It doesn’t fit into our long-term strategy".

=== List of B&B shows ===
Schedule of Bread & Butter shows, their locations and mottos:

Date	Location	Motto
July 13–15, 2001	Cologne	–
January 31 – February 2, 2002	Cologne	–
August 1 – 3 2002	Cologne	–
January 17–19, 2003	Berlin-Spandau	–
July 18–20, 2003	Berlin-Spandau	Berlinlove
January 16–18, 2004	Berlin-Spandau	Next Move
July 16–18, 2004	Berlin-Spandau	Berlingold
January 21–23, 2005	Berlin-Spandau	Selected
July 8-10 2005	Barcelona	Eurovision
July 22–24, 2005	Berlin-Spandau	Eurovision
January 18–20, 2006	Barcelona	Eurovision
January 27–29, 2006	Berlin-Spandau	Eurovision
July 5-7 2006	Barcelona	COMMUNITY
July 14–16, 2006	Berlin-Spandau	COMMUNITY
January 17–19, 2007	Barcelona	Active
January 26–27, 2007	Berlin-Spandau	Active
July 4–6 2007	Barcelona	Fly BBB
January 16–18, 2008	Barcelona	King Size
July 2–4 2008	Barcelona	New Order
January 21–23, 2009	Barcelona	United Nations
July 1–3 2009	Berlin-Tempelhof	Berlin, Berlin
January 20–22, 2010	Berlin-Tempelhof	The Original
July 7–9 2010	Berlin-Tempelhof	Premier League
January 19–21, 2011	Berlin-Tempelhof	Absolute
July 6–8 2011	Berlin-Tempelhof	Supershow
January 18–20, 2012	Berlin-Tempelhof	High Fidelity
July 4–6 2012	Berlin-Tempelhof	The Rock
January 15–17, 2013	Berlin-Tempelhof	Big Time
July 2-4 2013	Berlin-Tempelhof	Connect
January 14–16, 2014	Berlin-Tempelhof	Ich bin ein Berliner.
July 8-10 2014	Berlin-Tempelhof	Carnaval do Brasil
January 19–21, 2015	Berlin-Tempelhof	
July 7-9 2015	Berlin-Tempelhof	
September 3–5, 2015	Seoul	
September 2–4, 2016	Arena Berlin	NOW
September 1–3, 2017	Arena Berlin	Bold
August 31 - September 2, 2018	Arena Berlin	
