= Germany's Next Topmodel season 5 =

Germany's Next Topmodel
- Season 5
- Judges: Heidi Klum; Kristian Schuller; Qualid "Q" Ladraa
- No. of contestants: 18
- Winner: Alisar Ailabouni
- No. of episodes: 16

Release
- Original network: ProSieben
- Original release: 4 March – 10 June 2010

Season chronology
- ← Previous; Season 4 Next → Season 6

The fifth season of Germany's Next Topmodel aired on German television network ProSieben from 4 March 2010 to 10 June 2010.

In difference to former seasons the show saw a significant change as the audition process was completely open this time whereas every model-wannabe got a chance to audition in front of the jury led by Heidi Klum.

The winner was 19-year-old Alisar Ailabouni from Schalchen. Her prizes include:

- A contract with Günther Klum's OneEins GmbH Management worth €200,000.
- A cover and spread in the German edition of Cosmopolitan.
- An advertising campaign for C&A, Gillette Venus, and Maybelline New York.

The international destinations for this season were set in Cape Town, Los Angeles, New York City and Milan.

== Contestants ==
(ages stated are at start of contest)

Name	Age	Height	Hometown	Finish	Place
Aline Kautz	16	1.77 m (5 ft 9 1/2 in)	Köln	Episode 4	18 (quit)
Lena Kaiser	17	1.77 m (5 ft 9 1/2 in)	Datteln	Episode 4	17–16
Petra Roscheck	25	1.79 m (5 ft 10 1/2 in)	Vienna, Austria	Episode 4	17–16
Lara Emsen	16	1.80 m (5 ft 11 in)	Wedel	Episode 5	15
Luisa Kreuger	18	1.76 m (5 ft 9 1/2 in)	Lünen	Episode 6	14
Cathérine Kropp	17	1.80 m (5 ft 11 in)	Lüdinghausen	Episode 7	13–12
Nadine Höcherl	19	1.80 m (5 ft 11 in)	Cham	Episode 7	13–12
Miriam Höller	22	1.83 m (6 ft 0 in)	Wesel	Episode 8	11
Wioleta Psiuk	18	1.79 m (5 ft 10 1/2 in)	Münster	Episode 9	10
Jacqueline Kohl	17	1.80 m (5 ft 11 in)	Koblenz	Episode 10	9
Viktoria Lantratova	22	1.78 m (5 ft 10 in)	Detmold	Episode 11	8
Pauline Afaja	19	1.80 m (5 ft 11 in)	Friedrichshafen	Episode 13	7–6
Leyla Mert	19	1.80 m (5 ft 11 in)	Sindelfingen	Episode 13	7–6
Louisa Mazzurana	22	1.71 m (5 ft 7 1/2 in)	Hanover	Episode 14	5
Neele Hehemann	21	1.82 m (5 ft 11 1/2 in)	Dresden	Episode 15	4
Laura Weyel	23	1.75 m (5 ft 9 in)	Düsseldorf	Episode 16	3
Hanna Bohnekamp	18	1.73 m (5 ft 8 in)	Wesel	Episode 16	2
Alisar Ailabouni	20	1.78 m (5 ft 10 in)	Mattighofen, Austria	Episode 16	1

== Episode summaries ==
No. overall	No. in season	Title	Original release date
56	1	"Großes Casting in Köln – kein Weg ist zu weit"	4 March 2010
The cycle begins with 23,248 girls at an open casting, introducing new judges Kristian Schuller and Qualid "Q" Ladraa. The competition narrows down to 42 contestants, who then face a photo shoot challenge with only four frames to impress the judges. After eliminating 11 more girls, Heidi announces the remaining contestants will head to their first destination.: Featured Photographer: Sven Schrader
57	2	"Berlin, Berlin - wir fahren nach Berlin"	11 March 2010
The top 31 girls travel to Berlin, where they're challenged with a catwalk test on the ICE-train, eliminating two more. In Berlin, they pose with wax figures at Madame Tussauds and walk for designer Anja Gockel at Berlin Fashion Week, where four more girls are eliminated, leaving the top 25.
58	3	""Germany's next Topmodel" bekommt Zuwachs"	18 March 2010
The remaining 25 girls travel to the airport, where Heidi announces that only 18 will make it through. New contestant Pauline joins via a Wildcard win on Wetten, dass..?, causing tension among the other girls. After a fashion show challenge and a photo shoot on a baggage conveyor belt, several girls are eliminated, with Lara and Wioleta standing out in the photo shoot. The episode ends with 18 finalists heading to Cape Town for the international leg of the competition.: Featured photographer: Mayk Azzato
59	4	"Fotoshooting mit Kristian Schuller in Kapstadt"	25 March 2010
The girls arrive in Cape Town, where they receive advice on auditioning and participate in a sand-surfing challenge, with Lara and Hanna excelling. Four girls, including Leyla and Wioleta, are chosen to walk in a fashion show for designer Malick. Past GNTM winners visit and offer advice, and the girls pose for judge Kristian Schuller on a beach photoshoot. Later, they fly to New York City, where Lena and Petra are eliminated at the weekly judging panel due to their struggles with photography directions and lack of ambition.: Quit: Aline Kautz; Challenge winner: Hanna Bohnekamp & Lara Emsen; Booked for job: Wioleta Psiuk, Leyla Mert, Viktoria Lantratova & Miriam Höller; First eliminated: Lena Kaiser; Bottom two: Luisa Kreuger & Petra Roscheck; Second eliminated: Petra Roscheck; Featured photographer: Kristian Schnuller; Special guests: Barbara Meier, Coco Rocha, Jennifer Hof, Lena Gercke & Sara Nuru; Featured client: Malick
60	5	"Umstyling und Cop-Shooting - NY rocks!"	1 April 2010
The girls get makeovers, with mixed reactions. At a casting, Alisar impresses and walks the NY Fashion Week for Elise Øverland, and five others are scouted for another casting. The girls then pose for a photo shoot, with Jacqueline impressing Heidi. However, Lara is unexpectedly eliminated at the judging panel due to her emotional reaction during the makeover.: Booked for job: Alisar Ailabouni; Bottom two: Luisa Kreuger & Lara Emsen; Eliminated: Lara Emsen; Featured photographer: Marc Baptiste; Special guest: Jennifer Starr; Featured client: Elise Øverland
61	6	"Rodeo Drive, Beverly Hills & Sunset Boulevard"	8 April 2010
In this episode, the aspiring models have to prove themselves in New York and show what they have learned so far on Germany's Next Top Model. The girls are also moving: finally off to the new model villa. After the candidates stayed in a designer hotel on Fifth Avenue in New York, they are now heading to the model villa. Now they have to prove everything they have learned so far in order to survive in New York. After all, only the best girls have a safe place in the new villa.: Booked for job: Leyla Mert, Alisar Ailabouni, Nadine Höcherl, Jacqueline Kohl, Hanna Bohnekamp & Neele Hehemann; Challenge winner: Viktoria Lantratova; First eliminated: Luisa Kreuger; Bottom two: Cathérine Kropp & Jacqueline Kohl; Second eliminated: None; Featured photographer: Russell James; Special guest: Tyson Beckford; Featured client:
62	7	"Sport, jede Menge Feuer und Catwalk-Action"	15 April 2010
The girls met their new runway coach Jorge and competed in a challenge, with Laura winning a dress and a trip to a club opening. They then attended a Reebok casting for a TV ad and online promotion, followed by a photoshoot with fire in front of the LA skyline. Cathérine and Nadine were eliminated due to weak performances, with Cathérine struggling to shine in the photoshoot and Nadine lacking femininity.: Challenge winner: Hanna Bohnekamp, Laura Weyel & Louisa Mazzurana; Booked for job: Miriam Höller; First eliminated: Cathérine Kropp; Bottom two: Jacqueline Kohl & Nadine Höcherl; Second eliminated: Nadine Höcherl; Featured photographer & special guest: Rankin; Featured client: Reebok
63	8	"Unangenehmer Besuch!"	22 April 2010
The girls posed almost nude with seaweed for photographer Michel Comte, with Brooklyn Decker offering guidance. They also auditioned for jewelry designer Tarina Tarantino, with Laura being chosen as the face of her new campaign. Eva Longoria surprised the girls by serving dinner at her restaurant and later joined them for a chat. Neele won a shopping coupon in a fake commercial challenge, while Miriam was ultimately eliminated for failing to showcase a more feminine side.: Challenge winner: Neele Hehemann; Booked for job: Laura Weyel; Eliminated: Miriam Höller; Featured photographer: Michel Comte; Special guests: Brooklyn Decker & Eva Longoria; Featured client: Tarina Tarantino
64	9	"Heidi hinter der Kamera"	29 April 2010
The girls competed in a high-heel obstacle course challenge, with Viktoria winning a laptop. They then had a casting for Baby Phat, where Louisa was booked for the runway show despite her height. The girls were photographed by Heidi Klum in lingerie, and later walked in sexy outfits at the judging panel, where Wioleta was eliminated.: Challenge winner: Viktoria Lantratova; Booked for job: Laura Weyel, Leyla Mert, Louisa Mazzurana, Viktoria Lantratova, Alisar Ailabouni & Viktoria Lantratova; Eliminated: Wioleta Psiuk; Featured photographer: Heidi Klum; Special guest: Kimora Lee Simmons; Featured client: Baby Phat
65	10	"Hoch hinauf auf Highheels"	6 May 2010
The girls had a runway lesson with Jorge and a challenge where they walked in high heels with their heads in glass domes, with Alisar winning jewelry. They then had a belly dance lesson with Heidi Klum. The weekly photo shoot had them posing in a nest as birds hatching from eggs. In a casting for a jeans company, Louisa and Pauline impressed, but Louisa won out in a close decision. Jacqueline was eliminated due to struggles in the photo shoot.: Challenge winner: Alisar Ailabouni; Booked for job: Louisa Mazzurana; First eliminated: None; Bottom two: Leyla Mert & Viktoria Lantratova; Second eliminated: Jacqueline Kohl; Featured photographer: Matt McCabe; Special guest: Katy Perry; Featured client:
66	11	"Manege frei!"	13 May 2010
The girls participated in a reward challenge, taking photos of themselves in front of San Francisco landmarks, with the "Golden Girls" team winning. Hanna was booked for a Sony PlayStation ad after impressing with her trampoline performance and singing. Back in LA, Thomas Gottschalk visited the girls, encouraging Pauline. However, at the weekly photo shoot, Pauline struggled with wardrobe malfunctions. At the judging panel, the girls walked with monkeys, and despite her supermodel looks, Viktoria was surprisingly eliminated for lacking a strong personality.: Challenge winner: Hanna Bohnekamp, Laura Weyel & Neele Hehemann; Booked for job: Hanna Bohnekamp & Leyla Mert; Bottom two: Alisar Ailabouni & Viktoria Lantratova; Eliminated: Viktoria Lantratova; Featured photographer: Kristian Schuller; Special guests: Cindy Crawford, Marco Kreuzpaintner, & Thomas Gottschalk; Featured client: Sony
67	12	"Heidi Klums Mädchen lernen fliegen"	22 May 2010
The episode started with a casting for Helena Christensen's new shop, where Pauline landed her first job. The girls then participated in a video shoot, running and falling on a mat, with Alisar, Leyla, and Pauline impressing. Four girls, including Hanna and Neele, were booked for a Cosmopolitan magazine spread. At the weekly judging panel, the girls performed a dance routine with sticks, and despite some struggles, no one was eliminated.: Booked for job: Alisar Ailabouni, Hanna Bohnekamp, Laura Weyel (x2), Neele Hehemann, &, Pauline Afaja; Bottom two: Alisar Ailabouni & Neele Hehemann; Eliminated: None; Featured director: Thomas Job; Special guest: Jorge Gonzales; Featured clients: Cosmopolitan Germany & Helena Christensen
68	13	"Heidi Klum verwöhnt ihre Mädchen"	29 May 2010
This time the girls are spared nothing from the shopping trip into the mud. However, it's time to close your eyes and keep going, because the season finale is getting closer and even the smallest mistakes can make the difference between a modeling career or a trip home.: Challenge winners: Alisar Ailabouni & Leyla Mert; Booked for job: Louisa Mazzurana; Bottom three: Alisar Ailabouni, Leyla Mert, & Pauline Afaja; Eliminated: Leyla Mert & Pauline Afaja; Featured director & special guest: Gilles Bensimon; Featured client:
69	14	"Covergirl"	3 June 2010
Alisar landed an international campaign for Sony Ericsson, while Laura impressed at the Cosmopolitan cover shoot. The girls attended a Black Eyed Peas concert and participated in a stunt interview challenge, with Laura winning. Before the elimination, they had a final runway lesson. At the judging panel, the girls walked in Prêt-à-porter and Haute Couture and received video messages from loved ones. Louisa was eliminated, but the remaining four would continue to Milan for a runway show before the semifinals.: Booked for job: Alisar Ailabouni; Challenge winner: Laura Weyel; Eliminated: Louisa Mazzurana; Featured photographer: Mark Liddell; Special guest: Petra Gessulat & The Black Eyed Peas; Featured client: Sony Ericsson
70	15	"Es wird spannend - Das Semifinale"	9 June 2010
The final four girls shot a commercial and print campaign for Gillette Venus, followed by a photo shoot with Kristian Schuller where they jumped in blankets and were covered in powder. Neele struggled initially, while Hanna and Alisar showed newfound confidence. At a Milan runway show, they were surprised by their families and friends in the audience. At the judging panel, Neele was eliminated due to her struggles with the commercial aspect of the competition, despite her edgy and high-fashion look.: Bottom three: Alisar Ailabouni, Hanna Bohnekamp, & Neele Hehemann; Eliminated: Neele Hehemann; Featured director: Ben Hartenstein; Featured photographer: Kristian Schuller
71	16	"Das Finale"	10 June 2010
It's time! The grand finale of season 5 of Germany's Next Top Model begins. With a breathtaking stage show and the 3 finalists. There will also be a reunion with the top 18 of this season. Laura, who was booked for four jobs, is eliminated first, what leaves Hanna, who was booked for three jobs, and Alisar, who was booked for 5 jobs. After a last walk and a photoshoot Alisar is declared the fifth winner of Germany's Next Topmodel.: Final three: Alisar Ailabouni, Hanna Bohnekamp & Laura Weyel; Eliminated: Laura Weyel; Final two: Alisar Aliabouni & Hanna Bohnekamp; Germany's Next Topmodel: Alisar Aliabouni; Special guests: Collien Fernandes, Katy Perry, Kylie Minogue, Lena Gercke, Monrose, & Silversun Pickups

== Summaries ==
=== Results table ===
Place	Model	Episodes													
Place	Model	4 (Note: Prior to the start of episode 4, Aline decided to quit the competition.)	5	6	7	8	9	10	11	12 (Note: Episode 12 was a non-elimination.)	13	14	15	16	
1	Alisar	SAFE	SAFE	SAFE	SAFE	SAFE	SAFE	SAFE	LOW	LOW	LOW	SAFE	LOW	SAFE	WIN
2	Hanna	SAFE	SAFE	SAFE	SAFE	SAFE	SAFE	SAFE	SAFE	SAFE	SAFE	SAFE	LOW	LOW	OUT
3	Laura	SAFE	SAFE	SAFE	SAFE	SAFE	SAFE	SAFE	SAFE	SAFE	SAFE	SAFE	SAFE	OUT	
4	Neele	SAFE	SAFE	SAFE	SAFE	SAFE	SAFE	SAFE	SAFE	LOW	SAFE	SAFE	OUT		
5	Louisa	SAFE	SAFE	SAFE	SAFE	SAFE	SAFE	SAFE	SAFE	SAFE	SAFE	OUT			
6–7	Leyla	SAFE	SAFE	SAFE	SAFE	SAFE	SAFE	LOW	SAFE	SAFE	OUT				
6–7	Pauline	SAFE	SAFE	SAFE	SAFE	SAFE	SAFE	SAFE	SAFE	SAFE	OUT				
8	Viktoria	SAFE	SAFE	SAFE	SAFE	SAFE	SAFE	LOW	OUT						
9	Jacqueline	SAFE	SAFE	LOW	LOW	SAFE	SAFE	OUT							
10	Wioleta	SAFE	SAFE	SAFE	SAFE	SAFE	OUT								
11	Miriam	SAFE	SAFE	SAFE	SAFE	OUT									
12–13	Catherine	SAFE	SAFE	LOW	OUT										
12–13	Nadine	SAFE	SAFE	SAFE	OUT										
14	Luisa	LOW	LOW	OUT											
15	Lara	SAFE	OUT												
16–17	Petra	OUT													
16–17	Lena	OUT													
18	Aline	OUT													

The contestant was in danger of elimination
The contestant was eliminated
The contestant withdrew from the competition
The contestant won the competition

=== Photo shoot guide ===
- Episode 1 photo shoot: Emotions
- Episode 2 photo shoot: Celebrity wax figures
- Episode 3 photo shoot: Conveyor belt at the airport
- Episode 4 photo shoot: Couture gymnastics on pull-Up rings
- Episode 5 photo shoot: Arrested by the NYPD
- Episode 6 photo shoot: Swimsuits with a male model
- Episode 7 photo shoot: Fire over the Los Angeles skyline
- Episode 8 photo shoot: Seaweed bikinis on the beach
- Episode 9 photo shoot: Lingerie under the covers
- Episode 10 photo shoot: Winter birds
- Episode 11 photo shoot: Circus couture
- Episode 12 video shoot: Shopping madness
- Episode 13 photo shoot: Covered in mud
- Episode 14 photo shoot: Cosmopolitan covers
- Episode 15 commercial: Gillette venus
- Episode 15 photo shoots: Beauty shots in blankets; covered in powder
