= Luisa Hartema =

German model (born 1994)

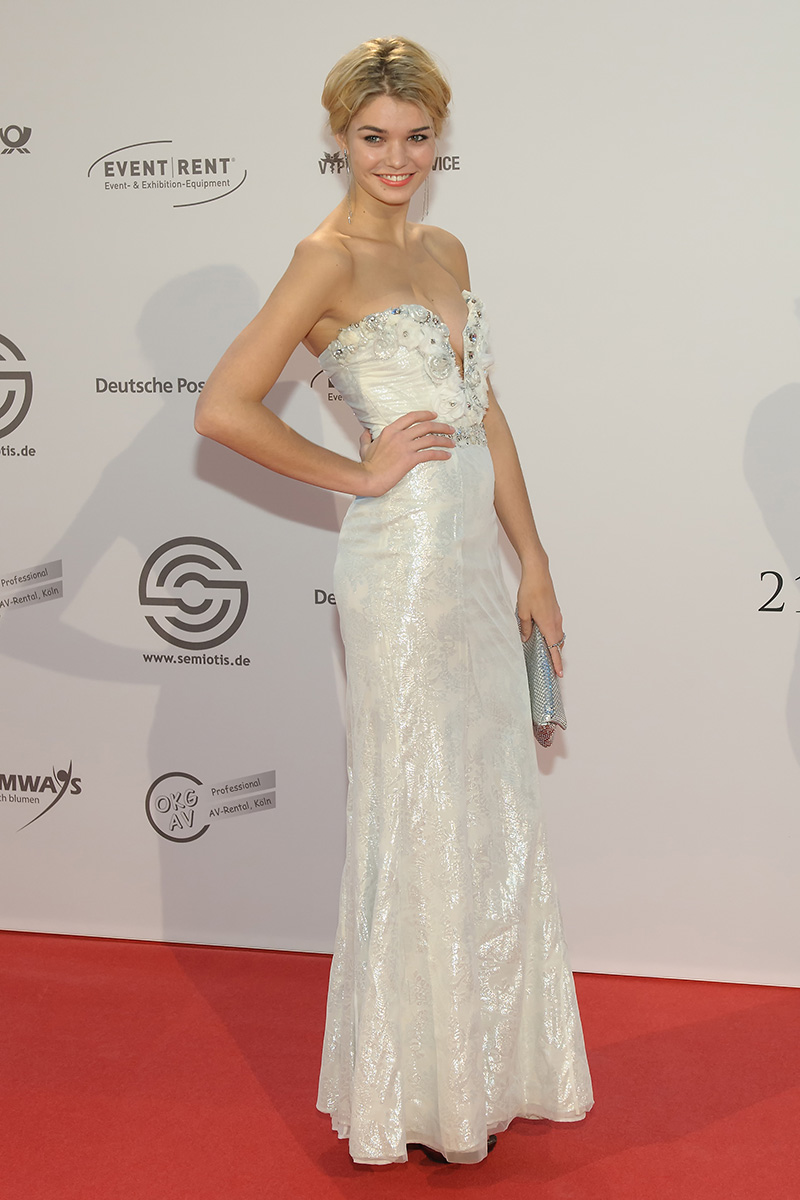
- Hartema in 2012
- Born: 26 December 1994 (age 30); Leer, Germany
- Occupation: Model
- Years active: 2012–present
- Modeling information
- Height: 5 ft 9 1/2 in (1.77 m)
- Hair color: Blonde
- Eye color: Blue

Luisa Hartema (born 26 December 1994) is a German model. She won the seventh season of Germany's Next Topmodel.

== Biography ==
In 2012, Hartema took part in the seventh season of ProSieben's Germany's Next Topmodel, presented by Heidi Klum, which 15,700 candidates applied for. She quickly became a stand-out candidate for her modeling potential, which was praised by the judges as well as by all the clients that appeared in the show, but her lack of self-confidence was criticized by the judges at the same time. Throughout the show, Hartema was picked for seven jobs in total, which makes her the candidate with the most booked jobs in the history of all Germany's Next Topmodel seasons.

She won the competition in the live finale on 7 June 2012 at the Lanxess Arena in Cologne, beating Sarah-Anessa Hitzschke, Dominique Miller and Kasia Lenhardt. As her prizes for winning, she received a cover of German Cosmopolitan, a temporary apartment stay in a fashion metropolis of her choice, campaigns with Emmi Caffè Latte, Maybelline Jade and Zalando, and a contract with OneEins Management.

In 2012, she appeared in the music video for Hurricane Dean's "Appeal".

In 2013, she was featured in Elle and Harper's Bazaar.

In 2014, she worked for ASOS.com and Escada, and signed a contract with ONEeins Management.

She has since been signed with Munich Models and IMG Models in Australia.

== Filmography ==
- 2012: Hurricane Dean - "Appeal"
