= Germany's Next Topmodel season 4 =

Germany's Next Topmodel
- Season 4
- Judges: Heidi Klum; Peyman Amin; Rolf Scheider
- No. of contestants: 17
- Winner: Sara Nuru
- No. of episodes: 16

Release
- Original network: ProSieben
- Original release: 12 February – 21 May 2009

Season chronology
- ← Previous; Season 3 Next → Season 5

The fourth season of Germany's Next Topmodel aired on the German television network ProSieben from 12 February 2009 to 21 May 2009.

In contrast to previous seasons, the show saw a significant change as the audition process was completely open this time, such that every model-wannabe got a chance to audition in front of the jury led by Heidi Klum. The numbers of applications were 1,104 in Düsseldorf, 1,376 in Munich and 18,786 who applied before via mail.

The winner of this season 19-year-old Sara Nuru from Munich. Her prizes include:

- A contract with Günther Klum's OneEins GmbH Management worth €200,000.
- A cover and spread in the German edition of Cosmopolitan.
- An advertising campaign for C&A and Maybelline New York.
- A Suzuki Swift Sport

The following prizes have been removed:

- A contract with IMG Models in Paris.
- A Volkswagen Tiguan

The international destinations for this season were set in Los Angeles, Las Vegas, New York City and Singapore.

== Contestants ==
(ages stated are at start of contest)

Contestant	Age	Height	Hometown	Finish	Place
Olivia Bermann	20	1.77 m (5 ft 9 1/2 in)	Berlin	Episode 4	17–15
Johanna Popp	21	1.81 m (5 ft 11 1/2 in)	Nuremberg	Episode 4	17–15
Daphne Braun	17	1.73 m (5 ft 8 in)	Melle	Episode 4	17–15
Tessa Bergmeier	19	1.80 m (5 ft 11 in)	Überlingen	Episode 5	14
Dana Franke	20	1.77 m (5 ft 9 1/2 in)	Berlin	Episode 6	13
Tamara Busch	16	1.75 m (5 ft 9 in)	Giessen	Episode 7	12–11
Aline Bauer	19	1.77 m (5 ft 9 1/2 in)	Marbach am Neckar	Episode 7	12–11
Stefanie Theissing	21	1.80 m (5 ft 11 in)	Münster	Episode 9	10
Katrina Scharinger	19	1.79 m (5 ft 10 1/2 in)	Nuremberg	Episode 10	9
Larissa Marolt (Note: Larissa previously competed in the first season of Austria's Next Topmodel, where she was the winner and automatically secured a place among the final cast.)	16	1.75 m (5 ft 9 in)	Sankt Kanzian am Klopeiner See, Austria	Episode 11	8
Ira Meindl	21	1.78 m (5 ft 10 in)	Cologne	Episode 12	7
Sarina Nowak	17	1.74 m (5 ft 8 1/2 in)	Uelzen	Episode 13	6
Maria Beckmann	19	1.79 m (5 ft 10 1/2 in)	Würzburg	Episode 14	5–4
Jessica Motzkus	20	1.77 m (5 ft 9 1/2 in)	Wolfsburg	Episode 14	5–4
Marie Nasemann	19	1.77 m (5 ft 9 1/2 in)	Gauting	Episode 16	3
Mandy Bork	17	1.75 m (5 ft 9 in)	Witten	Episode 16	2
Sara Nuru	19	1.76 m (5 ft 9 1/2 in)	Munich	Episode 16	1

== Episode summaries ==
No. overall	No. in season	Title	Original release date
40	1	"Die Schönen und das Biest"	9 February 2009
Germany's most successful model, Heidi Klum, opens the doors to the fashion world for the contestants of the fourth season of her hit show. Who will be "Germany's Next Top Model" 2009? The first open casting in Düsseldorf: Klum and her jury colleagues Peyman Amin and Rolf Schneider looked at 1,104 applicants for five hours. Which girls will make it to the first photo shoot and who will have to go home?
41	2	"Münchener Schickeria"	19 February 2009
Today, Heidi Klum, Peyman Amin, and Rolf Scheider are traveling to Munich for their second open casting call. In the Isar metropolis, 1,376 applicants, dressed in high heels and cool outfits, are eagerly waiting to fulfill their dreams. They all want to become "Germany's Next Top Model" 2009, but Heidi Klum can only take a few of them with her. The judges picked girls out and reduced their number down to the next 15 contestants. This casting was in Munich.
42	3	"Eisprinzessinnen und ein Kartoffelsack"	26 February 2009
The top 30 girls are off on their first trip: their first fashion show and an ice shoot await them in Berlin, where the models have to dress warmly. You can see who it is too cold for and who can melt the ice here.
43	4	"Konkurrenz aus Österreich"	5 March 2009
When they arrive in L.A. there is the first disillusionment: a new competitor joins the group. Larissa, the winner of Austria's Next Top Model. She quickly finds a connection and Tessa as a friend, but unfortunately the harmony quickly evaporates.: Challenge winners: Larissa Marolt, Mandy Bork & Tessa Bergmeier; Booked for job: Marie Nasemann; Eliminated: Daphne Braun, Johanna Popp, & Olivia Berman; Featured photographer: Matt McCabe; Special guests: Clint Catalyst, Giddle Partridge, Jared Gold, Jessicka, & Lena Gercke
44	5	"Aufstand im Heidi-Land"	12 March 2009
There is a new styling for the 14 girls. Heidi Klum and hairstylist Helena Faccenda have come up with new looks for the girls. This isn't okay for Larissa, she refuses and freaks out. But Tessa's fuses also blow.: Challenge winner: Maria Beckmann; Booked for job: Larissa Marolt, Maria Beckmann & Sara Nuru; Eliminated: Tessa Bergmeier; Featured photographer: Patricia von Ah; Special guest: Melanie B
45	6	"Viva Las Vegas"	19 March 2009
It gets playful for the remaining 13 candidates: Heidi Klum flies to Las Vegas with her models. But the trip is not beneficial for everyone.: Challenge winner: Mandy Bork; Booked for job: Ira Meindl, Marie Nasemann & Stefanie Thiessing; Eliminated: Dana Franke; Featured photographer: Philippe Kerlo
46	7	"Regen in Downtown L.A."	26 March 2009
During the photo shoot, the candidates for Germany's Next Top Model could get their feet wet: They pose on the street in the cold rain in front of star photographer Rankin. Who is convincing despite the difficult circumstances?: Challenge winner: Aline Bauer; Booked for job: Marie Nasemann; Bottom three: Aline Bauer, Stefanie Theissing, & Tamara Busch; Eliminated: Aline Bauer & Tamara Busch; Featured photographer: Rankin
47	8	"Der Sprung ins kalte Wasser"	2 April 2009
The girls get their claws out and Larissa is the total outsider of the group. But the 16-year-old doesn't let the bullying get her down. Especially since there are important castings and a mermaid shoot coming up again!: Challenge winners: Ira Meindl & Sara Nuru; Booked for job: Maria Beckmann; Eliminated: None; Featured photographer: Todd Essick; Special guest: Petra Gessulat
48	9	"Pole Dancing"	9 April 2009
New York shows who has an international chance of becoming a top model. Who gets to go on the catwalk with the professionals at Fashion Week? There is also a hot pole dancing shoot.: Challenge winner: Ira Meindl; Booked for job: Larissa Marolt, Mandy Bork (x2), Maria Beckmann, Marie Nasemann & Sara Nuru; Eliminated: Stefanie Theissing; Featured photographer: Walter Chin
49	10	"Das grosse Kopfschütteln"	16 April 2009
The candidates demonstrate their acting talent and film their first commercial.: Challenge winner: Larissa Marolt; Booked for job: Jessica Motzkus & Maria Beckmann; Bottom two: Sarina Nowak & Katrina Scharinger; Eliminated: Katrina Scharinger; Featured director: Andreas Kayales; Special guest: Bar Refaeli
50	11	"Sexy Diven"	23 April 2009
The girls take on the role of style icons like Marilyn Monroe and have to prove once again whether they have what it takes to become a top model.: Challenge winner: Sarina Nowak; Booked for job: Marie Nasemann; Eliminated: Larissa Marolt; Featured photographer: Kristian Schuller; Special guests: Karolina Kurkova & Philipp Plein
51	12	"Aloha, Topmodels!"	30 April 2009
In this episode the young models are off to Hawaii! The aim is to land an order from an internationally known brand. Then it's back to L.A. to prepare for her rock star shoot. You really have to rock out!: Challenge winners: Jessica Motzkus & Ira Meindl; Booked for job: Mandy Bork; Eliminated: Ira Meindl; Special guests: Good Charlotte & Phillipp Plein
52	13	"Bed of Roses"	7 May 2009
Little movement, lots of expression: The top model candidates face a photoshoot with star photographer Russell James in a bed of red roses. How do the final six perform on the bed of roses? The candidates also have two auditions to land a job and impress the judges in the final stretch. A very special guest awaits the girls at the final decision: Victoria Beckham.: Challenge winner: Sara Nuru; Booked for job: Jessica Motzkus & Sara Nuru; Bottom two: Jessica Motzkus & Sarina Nowak; Eliminated: Sarina Nowak; Featured photographer: Russell James; Special guest: Victoria Beckham
53	14	"Cover Shoot"	14 May 2009
One week and two shows left until the finale: Today and Tuesday, "Germany's Next Top Model – by Heidi Klum" will decide who advances to the finals and whose dream will be over so close to the finish line. The top five have only a few chances left to impress the jury. This week's challenge calls for creativity: Each girl organizes her own photoshoot – from location to styling to makeup.: Challenge winner: Mandy Bork; Cast for job: Sara Nuru; Eliminated: Maria Beckmann; Featured director: Ben Hartenstein; Special guest: Petra Gesulat
54	15	"Du Schwarze, du Blonde, du Braune"	19 May 2009
Jessica, Mandy, or Marie: Which two girls will advance to the finals of "Germany's Next Top Model – by Heidi Klum" alongside Sarah, and whose dream will be shattered? Based on the number of successful auditions, Marie has the best chance. But the Munich native is the only one of the remaining three candidates who hasn't won a single challenge, and her last job was several weeks ago. "In the end, it all comes down to the little things – the nuances," says Heidi Klum.: Booked for job: Mandy Bork, Marie Nasemann & Sara Nuru; Bottom two: Mandy Bork & Jessica Motzkus; Eliminated: Jessica Motzkus; Special guests: Michela Maggioni & Petra Gesulat
55	16	"Das große Finale"	21 May 2009
This is going to be huge! The finale of "Germany's Next Top Model – by Heidi Klum" will take place for the first time at the Lanxess Arena in Cologne. The venue has space for 8,000 guests, ten times the capacity of last year's finale. For the finale of "Germany's Next Top Model – by Heidi Klum," the arena will be transformed into a giant catwalk. Additionally, a large stage will be set up for several live acts. Who will Heidi Klum crown "Germany's Next Top Model" 2009?: Final three: Mandy Bork, Marie Nasemann & Sara Nuru; Eliminated: Marie Nasemann; Final two: Mandy Bork & Sara Nuru; Germany's Next Topmodel: Sara Nuru; Special guests: A-ha, Kelly Clarkson & Queensberry

== Summaries ==
=== Results table ===
Place	Model	Episodes												
Place	Model	4	5	6	7	8 (Note: Episode 8 was a non-elimination.)	9	10	11	12	13	14	16	
1	Sara	SAFE	SAFE	SAFE	SAFE	SAFE	SAFE	SAFE	SAFE	SAFE	SAFE	SAFE	LOW	WIN
2	Mandy	SAFE	SAFE	SAFE	SAFE	SAFE	SAFE	SAFE	SAFE	SAFE	SAFE	LOW	SAFE	OUT
3	Marie	SAFE	SAFE	SAFE	SAFE	SAFE	SAFE	SAFE	SAFE	SAFE	SAFE	SAFE	OUT	
4–5	Jessica	SAFE	SAFE	SAFE	SAFE	SAFE	SAFE	SAFE	SAFE	LOW	LOW	OUT		
4–5	Maria	SAFE	SAFE	SAFE	SAFE	SAFE	SAFE	SAFE	SAFE	SAFE	SAFE	OUT		
6	Sarina	SAFE	SAFE	SAFE	SAFE	SAFE	SAFE	LOW	SAFE	SAFE	OUT			
7	Ira	SAFE	SAFE	SAFE	SAFE	SAFE	SAFE	SAFE	SAFE	OUT				
8	Larissa	SAFE	SAFE	SAFE	SAFE	SAFE	SAFE	SAFE	OUT					
9	Katrina	SAFE	SAFE	SAFE	SAFE	SAFE	SAFE	OUT						
10	Stefanie	SAFE	SAFE	SAFE	LOW	LOW	OUT							
11–12	Tamara	SAFE	SAFE	SAFE	OUT									
11–12	Aline	SAFE	SAFE	SAFE	OUT									
13	Dana	SAFE	SAFE	OUT										
14	Tessa	SAFE	OUT											
15–17	Olivia	OUT												
15–17	Johanna	OUT												
15–17	Daphne	OUT												

The contestant was in danger of elimination
The contestant was eliminated
The contestant won the competition

=== Photo shoot guide ===
- Episode 1 photo shoot: Düsseldorf
- Episode 2 photo shoot: Munich shooting
- Episode 3 photo shoot: Frostbitten beauty
- Episode 4 photo shoot: Burning car in the desert in pairs
- Episode 5 photo shoot: Hanging from a hot air balloon
- Episode 6 photo shoot: Brides in B&W
- Episode 7 photo shoot: Bikinis in the rain
- Episode 8 photo shoot: Underwater
- Episode 9 photo shoot: Pole dancing
- Episode 10 commercial: Wonder Bra
- Episode 11 photo shoot: Famous divas
- Episode 12 photo shoot: Rock stars
- Episode 13 photo shoot: American beauty
- Episode 14 photo shoot: Cosmopolitan covers
- Episode 15 photo shoot: Elle Singapore covers
- Episode 16 photo shoot: Bull riding

== Controversies ==
Sophia Thomalla, daughter of German actress Simone Thomalla, was eliminated in the first round for having a friendship with judge Peyman Amin.

In August 2022, finalist Marie Nasemann revealed that she suffers from the spinal condition Scoliosis. Back in 2009, during the fourth season, her Scoliosis was discussed at a casting for Samsung. The editors of Germany's Next Topmodel tried to make her cry because of her illness and she also reveals: "I found out years later that Samsung would have liked to book me, but from the production side it wasn't allowed".

In September 2022, the winner Sara Nuru joined the criticism of the show as she said: "I was not aware of how blatantly young women were treated there. It was as if I had blinders on, a lot is me I wasn't aware of it even as a participant. I'm still horrified by how young women are treated." She added: "With the knowledge I have today, I would not take part in Germany's Next Topmodel again."

In January 2023, the relentless criticism continued when Tessa Bergmeier criticized the Show and Heidi Klum live in front of an audience of millions during her participation in the 16th season of I'm a Celebrity - Get Me Out of Here. In a conversation with model Papis Loveday, she said: "They screwed me! I found it unfair. I had no idea what kind of light they wanted to put me in. They portrayed me as a bitch. [...] They made me a monster, I wasn't." Bergmeier describes Klum as "super-mega psycho. The devil is in her. [...] She laughs at little girls [...] A person who can torment others without any feeling of guilt. I couldn't continue modelling in Hamburg, no client wanted me anymore." Papis Loveday, who also worked on GNTM, added about Klum: "She only thinks of herself. Nobody can shine more than she does."

In February 2023 Der Spiegel gives a glimpse into the notorious gag contracts that candidates have to sign in order to be able to take part in the Heidi Klum show. According to the Hamburg lawyer Jörg Nabert, these are "illegal gag contracts". The contract binds the women to an agency for two years. A regulation that, according to Nabert, is not customary in the industry. The participants also agree that the recordings "present them in a way that they don't like themselves". According to Der Spiegel, the contracts say: "The contributors are aware of any burdens that may result for them". If necessary, “substantive suggestions” would be made and enforced by the show management. Germany's Next Topmodel can thus stylize people like Tessa Bergmeier as "bitches" without them being able to defend themselves effectively afterwards. Heidi Klum's casting show goes further than similar formats with this practice.
