= Jana Beller =

Russian German model

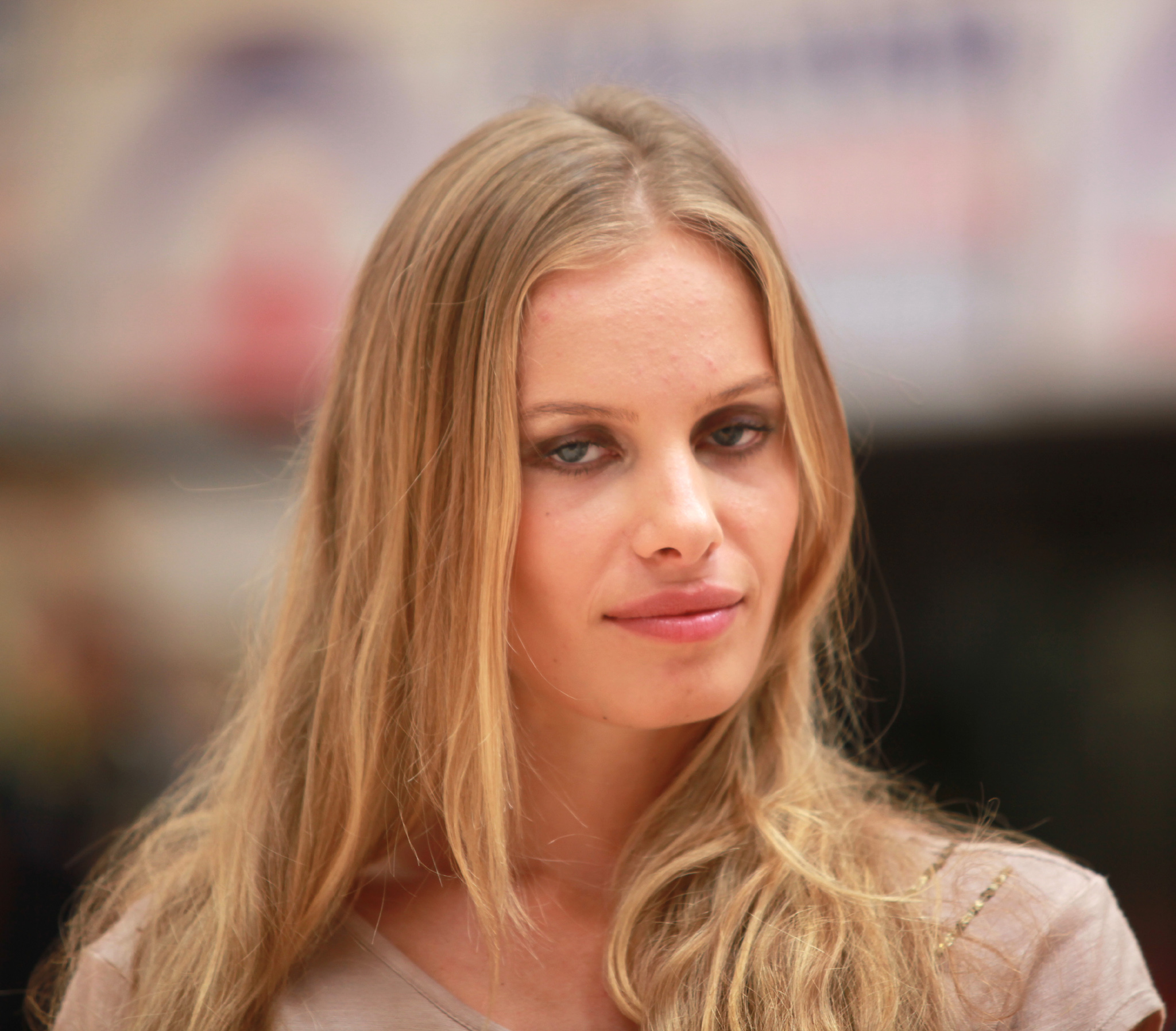
- Beller in August 2011
- Born: Jana Vladimirovna Beller; 27 October 1990 (age 35); Omsk, Soviet Union
- Modeling information
- Height: 1.73 m (5 ft 8 in)
- Hair color: Blonde

Jana Vladimirovna Beller (Russian: Яна Владимировна Беллер) (born 27 October 1990 in Omsk) is a Soviet-born German model, best known for winning the sixth cycle of Germany's Next Top Model.

== Early life ==
Beller was born in the Soviet Union to ethnic German parents and moved to Germany when she was a child. She has been playing chess since she was five years old. In 2009 Beller was featured in a documentary that showed ambitious girls attempting to start a modelling career.

== Germany's Next Top Model ==
Beller won the sixth cycle of Germany's Next Top Model. She was declared the winner in a live finale on 9 July 2011. Her prizes included 100,000 € in money and a 300,000 € contract with the Agency "One Eins", under the management of host Heidi Klum's father. However, soon after she switched to another agency.

== Career ==
She has since signed with new agencies and was on the cover of Cosmopolitan. Furthermore, she works for Misslyn and Rockberries. Since August 2012 Jana Beller works for Hugo Boss and Esprit.

=== Agencies ===
- Louisa Models (Germany)
- View Management (Spain)
- Elite Model Management (London)
- Ace-Models (Greece)
- IMG Models (Italy)
- Elite Model Management (Denmark)
- NOVA-Models (New Zealand)

Preceded by Alisar Ailabouni	Germany's Next Topmodel winner Cycle 6 (2011)	Succeeded by Luisa Hertema
