= Alisar Ailabouni =

Syrian-born Austrian model

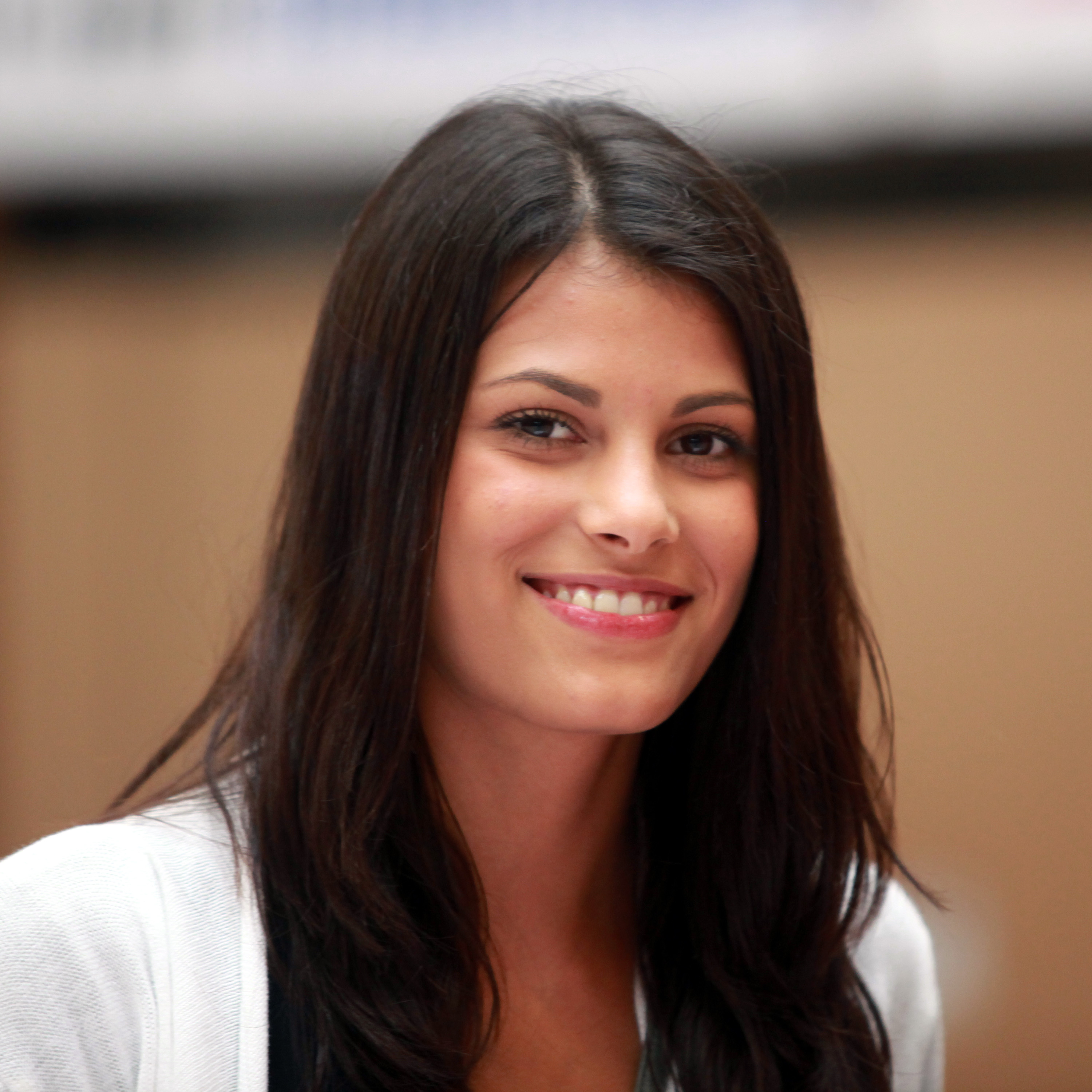
- Ailabouni in 2010
- Born: Alisar Ailabouni; 21 March 1989 (age 37); Damascus, Syria
- Modeling information
- Height: 1.78 m (5 ft 10 in)
- Hair color: Brown
- Eye color: Brown
- Agency: Red Model Management (New York); The Fabbrica (Milan); Francina Models (Barcelona)

Alisar Ailabouni (Arabic: أليسار عيلبوني; born 21 March 1989) is a Syrian-born Austrian fashion model and the winner of Germany's Next Topmodel, Cycle 5.

== Early life ==
Ailabouni moved to Austria when she was seven months old and grew up in Amstetten and Schörfling am Attersee, where she went to school. She played the role of Juliet in Shakespeare's Romeo and Juliet in the school's drama group. She has two brothers. Ailabouni plays basketball and played in the Austrian U16 team.

== Germany's Next Topmodel ==
After applying to an open casting call in Munich Ailabouni managed to reach the top 18 and started to dominate the competition by winning several castings. However, due to her shy personality, the judges questioned her limelight ability and saw her struggling several times when she was required to perform out of her comfort zone. For a long time, she was the only non-German top 3 finalist of Germany's Next Topmodel (although former winner Sara Nuru was of Ethiopian heritage she owns the German citizenship), until cycle 10, where Ajsa Selimovic, who lives in Austria, managed to reach the top 3. In the final, Alisar managed to win, beating fellow-contestants Hanna Bohnekamp and Laura Weyel on a live final held in June 2010. She then appeared on the cover of the German Cosmopolitan in July 2010, and in a commercial for Venus Breeze, a job she won on the show.

=== Withdrawal from ONEeins contract ===
Like her predecessor Sara Nuru, Ailabouni did not win a contract with a known modeling agency. She was managed by Günther Klum's Management ONEeins but decided barely after a year to leave the contract due to her feeling that she was given only mediocre, no modelling related work.

== Career ==
Ailabouni moved to Paris where she was taken under contract by PARS, the modelling agency of Peyman Amin who was a judge on GNTM but left before her participation. She also managed to get signed with other modeling agencies, Eskimo Models, City Models in Paris, Fashionmodel in Milan, Red in New York and Elite Model Management in London.

She played herself in the made-for-television film 'Deutschland gegen Österreich – Das Duell'.

She walked for G-Star SS2011-collection in New York and walked the Berlin Fashion Week the following season. She has also appeared in an editorial for Vogue Italia's December 2012 issue. She also walked for 17 different labels at New York Fashion Week in 2012.

In 2014, Ailabouni was the winning model in Project Runway (season 13). She won after Sean Kelly, the designer she modeled for, won the season.

Preceded by Sara Nuru	Germany's Next Topmodel winner Cycle 5 (2010)	Succeeded by Jana Beller
