= Germany's Next Topmodel season 6 =

2011 television show

Germany's Next Topmodel
- Season 6
- Judges: Heidi Klum; Thomas Hayo; Thomas Rath
- No. of contestants: 25
- Winner: Jana Beller
- No. of episodes: 16

Release
- Original network: ProSieben
- Original release: 3 March – 12 June 2011

Season chronology
- ← Previous; Season 5 Next → Season 7

The sixth season of Germany's Next Topmodel aired on German television network ProSieben from 3 March to 12 June 2011.

Once again the entire judging panel except for Heidi Klum was replaced. Q and Kristian Schuller both left the show after one Cycle. Thomas Hayo and fashion designer Thomas Rath joined in.

In difference to the last two years, this season featured a preselection without open castings. The first episode started with 50 semifinalists, the fewest since Cycle 1. This was also the first season where an elimination outside of panel can happen at any point.

The winner of the competition was 20-year-old Jana Beller from Recklinghausen. Her prizes include:

- A contract with Günther Klum's OneEins GmbH Management.
- A cover and spread in the German edition of Cosmopolitan.
- An advertising campaign for Gillette Venus and Maybelline New York.
- A cash prize worth €100,000 from Sony Ericsson.
- A Suzuki Swift Sport

The international destinations for this season were set in Schladming, London, Los Angeles, Nassau and Rio de Janeiro.

== Contestants ==
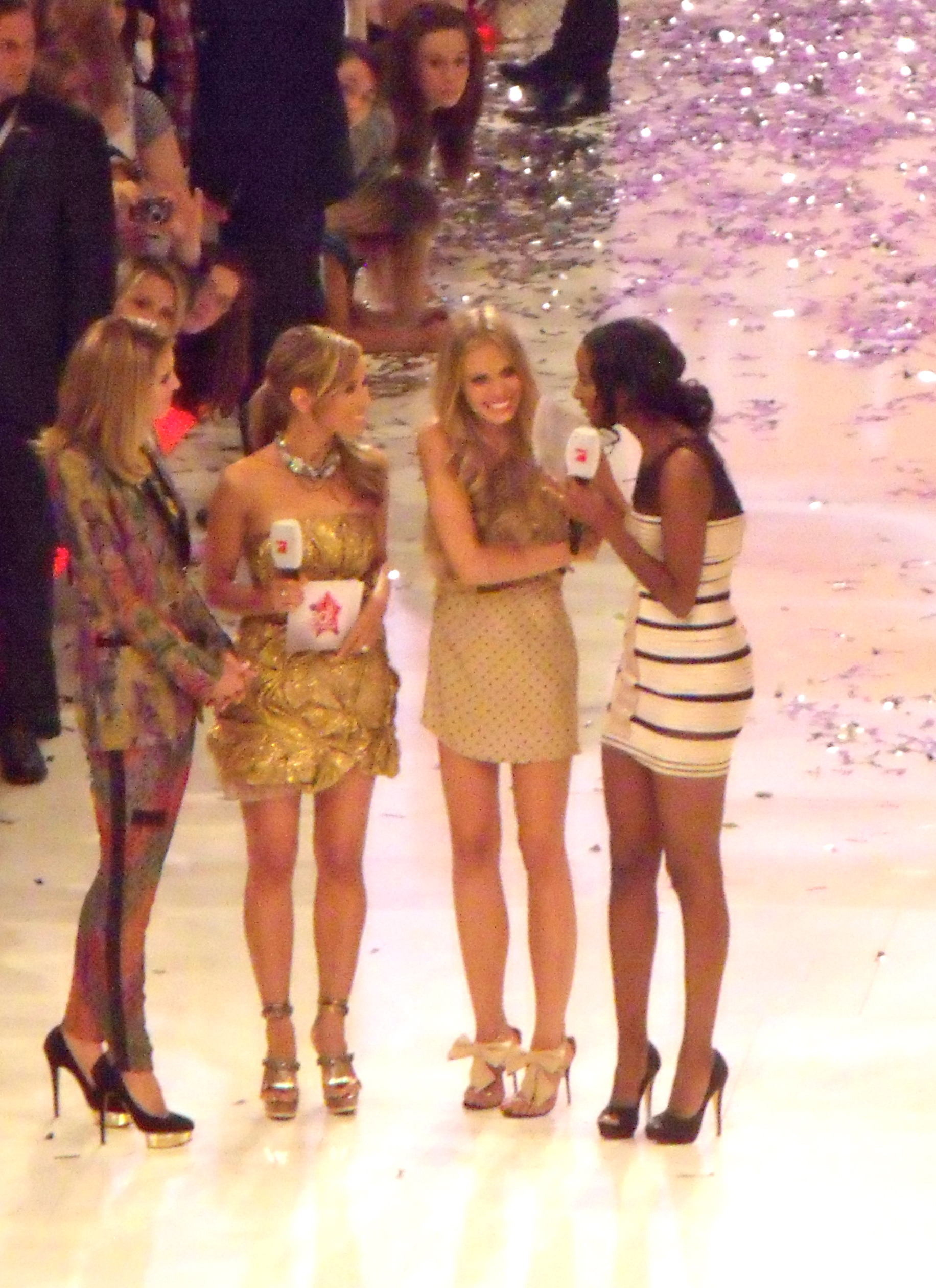
Jana Beller, being interviewed after becoming the sixth winner of Germany's Next Topmodel

(ages stated are at start of contest)

Contestant	Age	Height	Hometown	Finish	Place
Chiara-Isabell 'Chiara' Breder	16	1.73 m (5 ft 8 in)	Dortmund	Episode 2	25–24
Lilia Doubrovina	16	1.74 m (5 ft 8 1/2 in)	Stuttgart	Episode 2	25–24
Valerie Blum	20	1.76 m (5 ft 9 1/2 in)	Gladbeck	Episode 3	23 (quit)
Concetta Mazza	18	1.71 m (5 ft 7 1/2 in)	Böblingen	Episode 3	22
Ivon Zito	18	1.77 m (5 ft 9 1/2 in)	Stuttgart	Episode 3	21
Christien Fleischhauer	22	1.73 m (5 ft 8 in)	Berlin	Episode 4	20
Amira Regaieg	20	1.74 m (5 ft 8 1/2 in)	Hof	Episode 4	19
Franziska König	18	1.77 m (5 ft 9 1/2 in)	Potsdam	Episode 5	18
Simone Rohrmüller	18	1.74 m (5 ft 8 1/2 in)	Cham	Episode 7	17
Tahnee Keller	20	1.79 m (5 ft 10 1/2 in)	Stuttgart	Episode 7	16
Natascha Beil	20	1.73 m (5 ft 8 in)	Frankfurt	Episode 8	15
Paulina Kaluza	17	1.73 m (5 ft 8 in)	Bremen	Episode 8	14
Florence Lodevic	21	1.76 m (5 ft 9 1/2 in)	Capellen, Luxembourg	Episode 10	13
Isabel Rath	23	1.80 m (5 ft 11 in)	Mannheim	Episode 10	12
Sarah Jülich	18	1.78 m (5 ft 10 in)	Cologne	Episode 10	11
Joana Damek	20	1.72 m (5 ft 7 1/2 in)	Augsburg	Episode 11	10 (quit)
Jil Goetz	16	1.74 m (5 ft 8 1/2 in)	Stuttgart	Episode 11	9
Marie-Luise Schäfer	21	1.73 m (5 ft 8 in)	Eisenach	Episode 12	8
Lisa-Marie 'Lisa' Könnecke	16	1.78 m (5 ft 10 in)	Heilbronn	Episode 13	7
Sihe Jiang	17	1.71 m (5 ft 7 1/2 in)	Bremen	Episode 14	6
Aleksandra Nagel	20	1.72 m (5 ft 7 1/2 in)	Oldenburg	Episode 15	5
Anna-Lena Schubert	20	1.76 m (5 ft 9 1/2 in)	Erding	Episode 15	4
Amelie Klever	16	1.73 m (5 ft 8 in)	Hilden	Episode 16	3
Rebecca Mir	18	1.79 m (5 ft 10 1/2 in)	Aachen	Episode 16	2
Jana Beller	20	1.73 m (5 ft 8 in)	Recklinghausen	Episode 16	1

== Episode summaries ==
No. overall	No. in season	Title	Original release date
72	1	"Weltrekord geknackt"	3 March 2011
The 50 chosen semifinalists are invited to Schladming where they have to achieve a world record in highheels walking on a treadmill for 60 minutes. Being concerned about her feet, Joana withdraws after a few minutes much to the dissatisfaction of new judge Thomas Hayo. After the record is broken and a first live walk in front of the judges, 10 girls are cut. In their first challenge, the girls have to impress a mass audience on a sky-location Kesha concert in order to perform with her on stage. At the second judging, the girls have to walk on a runway above a swimming pool where 14 more contestants are eliminated, and the final cast is announced. After learning that she was diagnosed with lymph node cancer, Melek withdraws from the competition.: Special guest: Kesha
73	2	"London Calling"	10 March 2011
The 25 remaining finalists are taken to London. Seven of the girls receive makeovers where half-Chinese Sihe gets a blond bob. Meanwhile, the rest of the girls gets the chance to present themselves at a casting for the fashion label "Felder and Felder", where Rebecca and Paulina impress the most but in the end Rebecca is booked. Two beauty shoots are contacted with pre-and-post makeover removal where Heidi notices Jil's skin problems. The weekly runway challenge is taking place in a church where the girls have to walk in sexy bride outfits which Sarah refuses as she fears a bad reaction from her Christian school. Chiara-Isabell gets eliminated for not being ready to perform well in the competition yet just like Lilia, whose elimination is not shown in the episode. In the end, the 23 remaining girls continue in the competition.: Booked for job: Rebecca Mir; Eliminated: Chiara Breder & Lilia Doubrovina; Featured client: Felder and Felder
74	3	"Das Horror-Shooting"	17 March 2011
Still in London, the girls are taken to a tunnel where they meet this week's photographer Rankin, famous for his strict and rude behaviour towards the girls in former cycles. Several girls struggle at the photo shoot and Marie-Luise, Concetta, and Paulina are named as the bottom three with Concetta being immediately eliminated from the competition. On the next challenge the girls have to perform acts on a Queen's Guard at Buckingham Palace. In the evening, Paulina and Tahnee are randomly drawn to attend an aftershow party of the BAFTA awards. We then see how Rebecca performed on London Fashion Week where the designers that booked her the episode before were impressed by her. On the weekly elimination, the girls are asked to walk in pairs of two with a mask and instructions by runway coach Jorge. Although struggling on the runway once again, Lisa and Sarah are sent to the next round. The group of Florence, Christien, and Ivon who were paired together on the photo shoot find themselves in the bottom three together. The Top 20 is determined with Ivon being eliminated and an announcement is made that the next destination is Los Angeles.: Quit: Valerie Blum; Booked for job: Aleksandra Nagel, Jana Beller & Isabel Rath; Eliminated outside of panel: Concetta Mazza; Eliminated: Ivon Zito; Featured photographer: Rankin; Still Photography producer: Alisa Evdokimov; Featured client:
75	4	"Es kracht zwischen den Topmodels"	24 March 2011
The girls had a runway challenge on a plane. Rebecca is deemed to have had the best performance, whereas Christien and Franziska perform the worst. Christien is eliminated shortly after their arrival in Los Angeles because the judges think that she hasn't improved herself at all after weeks. At this week's photo shoot, the contestants have to pose in a high-voltage electric box while laughing a lot. Rebecca was especially praised by the judges for her great posing. At a casting for Mentos, Aleksandra, Rebecca, Amelie and Joana reach the second round. Aleksandra wins her second job and is consequently saved for this week. In the end, Amira is eliminated because the judges think that she has not shown enough of her personality despite being one of the most beautiful women among the contestants.: Booked for job & immune from elimination: Aleksandra Nagel; Eliminated outside of panel: Christien Fleischhauer; Eliminated: Amira Regaieg; Featured photographer: Matt McCabe; Featured client: Mentos
76	5	"Ich lass mich nicht angrabbeln!"	30 March 2011
The episode starts with a challenge where the girls have to helm a commercial clip where they have to kiss a monkey. In the end the winners of the challenge are Rebecca, Isabel, Anna-Lena and Amelie. Afterwards, the girls that didn't get a new hairstyling at the first time get a new look. Especially Paulina has a lot of problems with getting her hair cut. In the weekly photo shoot in lingerie Amelie and Rebecca perform best. The girls are divided into groups where they have to work on their weaknesses. Rebecca teaches Anna-Lena and Tahnee how to be more sexy but the two refuse to train because they don't like Rebecca. At panel the girls have to do a catwalk in the rain where Rebecca, Jana and Anna-Lena perform best while Tahnee, Franziska, Sarah and Paulina struggle. Franziska is eliminated.: Eliminated: Franziska König; Featured photographer: Ellen von Unwerth; Still Photography Producer: Alisa Evdokimov
77	6	"Ab in die Wüste"	7 April 2011
The girls go camping in the desert with the judges. The next morning they have an action photo shoot. They have to pose on skids of a flying helicopter where Rebecca is deemed best once again while Anna-Lena struggles. Marie-Luise is praised for doing the shoot in spite of her fear of heights. This week's casting is for Blessed & Cursed. Florence and Amelie are booked. The girls train to walk downstairs where Sarah is criticized. The girls have to walk downstairs at panel as well. Nobody is eliminated.: Booked for job: Amelie Klever & Florence Lodevic; Eliminated: None; Featured photographer: Marc Baptiste; Still Photography Producer: Alisa Evdokimov; Featured client: Blessed & Cursed
78	7	"Elvis, Dirndl & Trapeze"	14 April 2011
The girls do an artistic photo shoot for Cirque du Soleil where Jana and Amelie are deemed best while Rebecca struggles for the first time as well as Tahnee and Simone. Simone is eliminated for her terrible performance. The girls have a casting for Krüger Dirndl where Isabel, Rebecca and Anna-Lena reach the second round. The client primarily searched for a blond girl in contrast to the last campaign but with Rebecca and Anna-Lena two dark girls reach the second round because of their fantastic performances. In the end Rebecca is booked for her second job. In the weekly challenge the girls have to perform a 5-minute show on a huge stage where Marie-Luise is declared the winner because of her positive development in dancing. Amelie is very disappointed since she knows how to dance and everybody says that her performance was much better. At panel Marie-Luise and Tahnee land in the bottom two for their weak performances on the runway. Tahnee is eliminated.: Booked for job: Rebecca Mir; Challenge winner: Marie-Luise Schäfer; Eliminated outside of panel: Simone Rohrmüller; Bottom two: Marie-Luise Schäfer & Tahnee Keller; Eliminated: Tahnee Keller; Featured photographer: Tomas Muscionico; Featured client: Krüger Dirndl
79	8	"Konkurrenzkampf"	21 April 2011
At a casting for Garnier, Amelie, Rebecca and Jana reach the second round, where the three girls travel to Tampa. Amelie is booked because of her fantastic hair and performance. Paulina, Marie-Luise and Sarah do a special catwalk training with Jorge using rubber bands around their feet and water buckets on their heads. Joana is later booked for a W-society campaign. Paulina is noticed this week for back-biting. She is especially nasty about Rebecca and Sarah. At panel the girls have not only a live walk but a photo shoot as well. The girls do a sexy shooting in pairs. The better girl is saved immediately while the weaker one has to do a live walk later. Jil beats Paulina, Rebecca beats Anna-Lena, Amelie beats Aleksandra, Lisa beats Isabel, Joana beats Florence and Marie-Luise beats Sihe while Natascha and Sarah both are not saved although they have been in one photo shoot. Jana is the only girl who shoots alone but she is saved as well. Natascha is eliminated for her bad walk. Paulina and Sihe land in the bottom two. Paulina is eliminated.: Booked for job: Amelie Klever & Joana Damek; First eliminated: Natascha Beil; Bottom two: Sihe Jiang & Paulina Kaluza; Second eliminated: Paulina Kaluza; Featured photographer: N/A; Featured clients: Garnier & W-society
80	9	"Welcome to Brazil"	28 April 2011
The week starts with a runway-training where Jana, Rebecca and Amelie perform best. At a casting for Emmi AG Rebecca and Jana reach the second round. At another casting for German Shape Amelie, Anna-Lena, Aleksandra and Jil perform best, Aleksandra is booked for her third job. All the girls except of Aleksandra, Rebecca and Jana, who are absent, walk for a Brazilian designer. Lisa and Amelie perform best while Jil is deemed worst. At panel Sarah, Sihe and Jil land in the bottom three with nobody being eliminated.: Booked for job: Jana Beller & Aleksandra Nagel; Bottom three: Jil Goetz, Sarah Jülich & Sihe Jiang; Eliminated: None; Featured client: Emmi AG & Shape Germany
81	10	"Samba"	5 May 2011
The episode starts with a samba lesson where the girls have to show their vitality and agility. Jana and Aleksandra perform best and are allowed to dance on a big carnival carriage. Then the girls do a casting for a spread in German Cosmopolitan. Amelie, Joana and Anna-Lena are booked for their good performances. The girls do a photo shoot where they have to dance in different styles. Professional dancer Amelie produces Thomas Rath's favorite photo of the whole cycle. Rebecca, Jana, Anna-Lena, Aleksandra, Joana, Sihe and Jil also do a good job while Marie-Luise is able to produce only one single good photo. Florence is even eliminated because of her bad performance. At panel the girls have to walk in groups of three and to embody different themes and emotions. Amelie, Rebecca, Jana and Aleksandra are deemed best in their groups, with Amelie being the overall best while Joana is criticized for her faked smile, Sarah for her unprofessionalism and Isabel for always having the same expression. Sarah and Isabel are eliminated. Amelie is praised for her perfect week.: Booked for job: Amelie Klever, Joana Damek & Anna-Lena Schubert; Eliminated outside of panel: Florence Lodevic; First eliminated: Isabel Rath; Bottom two: Sarah Jülich & Sihe Jiang; Second eliminated: Sarah Jülich; Featured client: Cosmopolitan Germany
82	11	"Modelvilla"	12 May 2011
At the beginning of this episode the top ten move into their model villa. Amelie and Anna-Lena get into a conflict because both of them want to sleep in the biggest sleeping room. This week's photo shoot is in Roccoco outfits and with babies. Amelie is deemed best with Jana being second, while Rebecca and Joana struggle a bit. At a casting for Evian Jana and Amelie impress the most with Jana being booked for her second job. Before panel Joana leaves the show since she realized that she won't be one of the top 3 finalists. At panel Rebecca's walk is deemed best with Amelie being second best. Sihe and Jil land in the bottom two. Sihe's walk is deemed better thus letting her stay while Jil is eliminated.: Booked for job: Jana Beller; Quit: Joana Damek; Bottom two: Jil Goetz & Sihe Jiang; Eliminated: Jil Goetz; Featured client: Evian
83	12	"Werbespot-Dreh"	19 May 2011
The remaining girls have to play a commercial for shoes where Amelie performs best and Lisa is deemed worst. In the evening Heidi visits the girls in their villa where they do a catwalk training and bake pizza. Heidi reveals old photos of Anna-Lena showing her naked butt into the camera. Lisa, who won a shopping voucher being the challenge winner the week before goes shopping with judge Thomas Rath. Afterwards, the girls do a photo shoot with Steve-O where Lisa, Amelie and Rebecca perform best. At this week's challenge the girls are divided in three groups. Each group has to find the perfect outfit that matches the given topic: 50's, hippie and American lifestyle. Rebecca is deemed best. At panel Marie-Luise is eliminated.: Challenge winner: Lisa-Maria Könnecke; Eliminated: Marie-Luise Schäfer
84	13	"Unter Wasser"	22 May 2011
In the beginning the girls have a casting for Sony Ericsson. Amelie, Rebecca and Jana reach the second round. Amelie is booked for an international TV-spot and a campaign. The girls travel to the Bahamas. At the underwater-photo shoot Rebecca performs best while Lisa performs worst. Rebecca wins a prize she shares with Aleksandra. An undercover reporter tries to get explicit information from the girls. While Lisa doesn't want to tell anything Rebecca and Anna-Lena say a lot of things they shouldn't have told. The girls have a teaching where they have to take pictures and change clothes within a few minutes where Sihe and Anna-Lena struggle. At panel the girls have to do 3 walks in different styles and outfits. Only Amelie is able to fully convince the judges. Lisa is eliminated for her problems at the photo shoot and on the runway and in spite of her potential. Jana and Lisa's photos are deemed worst, while Anna-Lena, Amelie, Sihe and Aleksandra are also critiqued for not being as good as usual. Only Rebecca manages to take a photo that could be in a magazine.: Booked for job: Amelie Klever; Eliminated: Lisa Könnecke; Featured client: Sony Ericsson
85	14	"Shooting am Trapez"	26 May 2011
This week the girls do a beauty shoot with bees. Due to an allergy Aleksandra has to shoot with cockroaches. At a casting for Gillette Jana, Aleksandra and Rebecca reach the second round, with Jana being booked. In the challenge the girls have to do a stunt on a trapeze. Sihe, Anna-Lena and Amelie manage whereas Aleksandra and Rebecca struggle. In the end, Amelie is cleared as the winner of this challenge. Judge Thomas Rath does a fashion teaching with the girls where they have to design an outfit on their own. At panel Anna-Lena is critiqued for grousing about the shoes. Jana is critiqued for her walk and her picture, where she looks way too hard for a beauty shot, but she reaches the next round due to her job and past performance. Sihe is eliminated for not being able to keep up with the other girls.: Challenge winner: Amelie Klever; Booked for job: Jana Beller; Eliminated: Sihe Jiang; Featured client: Gillette Venus
86	15	"Das Halbfinale"	2 June 2011
The week starts with shooting the Cosmopolitan covers, which is one of the winner's prizes. Rebecca's performance is impressive, while Amelie struggles. Jana, Aleksandra and Anna-Lena do well in the shoot as well. At home the girls are surprised by their families or in Aleksandra's and Jana's case by their boyfriends. At panel all the girls impress with their walks. Jana reaches the final first. Aleksandra is eliminated for not being one of the contenders anymore. Amelie reaches the final second. Rebecca and Anna-Lena land in the bottom two and Anna-Lena is eliminated what makes Rebecca the last finalist.: First eliminated: Aleksandra Nagel; Bottom two: Anna-Lena Schubert & Rebecca Mir; Second eliminated: Anna-Lena Schubert; Special guest: Petra Gessulat
87	16	"Live finale"	9 June 2011
After an online voting between the girls who didn't reach the final, Aleksandra is chosen to open the top-20-walk. Amelie is eliminated first, which creates rumours that the reason for her elimination is that she is only 16. In the end, Jana wins the competition.: Top 20 walk opener: Aleksandra Nagel; Final three: Amelie Klever, Jana Beller & Rebecca Mir; Eliminated: Amelie Klever; Final two: Jana Beller & Rebecca Mir; Germany's Next Top Model: Jana Beller; Special guests: Caro Emerald, Keri Hilson & Lady Gaga

== Summaries ==
=== Results table ===
Place	Model	Episodes																	
Place	Model	1	2	3 (Note: In episode 3, Valerie decided to quit the competition. Concetta was eliminated outside of panel for her poor performance during the photo shoot.)	4 (Note: In episode 4, Christien was eliminated outside of panel for her poor performance during the runway challenge. Furthermore, Aleksandra was booked for the job and was granted immunity from elimination.)		5	6 (Note: Episode 6 was a non-elimination.)	7 (Note: In episode 7, Simone was eliminated outside of panel for her poor performance during the photo shoot.)	8	9 (Note: Episode 9 was a non-elimination.)	10 (Note: In episode 10, Florence was eliminated outside of panel for her poor performance during the photo shoot.)	11 (Note: In episode 11, Joana decided to quit the competition.)	12	13	14	15	16	
1	Jana	SAFE	SAFE	SAFE	SAFE	SAFE	SAFE	SAFE	SAFE	SAFE	SAFE	SAFE	SAFE	SAFE	SAFE	SAFE	SAFE	LOW	WIN
2	Rebecca	SAFE	SAFE	SAFE	SAFE	HIGH	SAFE	SAFE	SAFE	SAFE	SAFE	SAFE	SAFE	SAFE	SAFE	SAFE	LOW	SAFE	OUT
3	Amelie	SAFE	SAFE	SAFE	SAFE	SAFE	SAFE	HIGH	SAFE	SAFE	SAFE	SAFE	SAFE	SAFE	SAFE	SAFE	SAFE	OUT	
4	Anna-Lena	SAFE	SAFE	SAFE	SAFE	SAFE	SAFE	SAFE	SAFE	SAFE	SAFE	SAFE	SAFE	SAFE	SAFE	SAFE	OUT		
5	Aleksandra	SAFE	SAFE	SAFE	SAFE	IMM	SAFE	HIGH	SAFE	SAFE	SAFE	SAFE	SAFE	SAFE	SAFE	SAFE	OUT		
6	Sihe	SAFE	SAFE	SAFE	SAFE	SAFE	SAFE	SAFE	SAFE	LOW	LOW	LOW	LOW	SAFE	SAFE	OUT			
7	Lisa	SAFE	SAFE	SAFE	SAFE	SAFE	SAFE	SAFE	SAFE	SAFE	SAFE	SAFE	SAFE	LOW	OUT				
8	Marie-Luise	SAFE	SAFE	SAFE	SAFE	SAFE	SAFE	SAFE	LOW	SAFE	SAFE	SAFE	SAFE	OUT					
9	Jil	SAFE	SAFE	SAFE	SAFE	SAFE	SAFE	SAFE	SAFE	SAFE	LOW	SAFE	OUT						
10	Joana	SAFE	SAFE	SAFE	SAFE	SAFE	SAFE	HIGH	SAFE	SAFE	SAFE	SAFE	QUIT						
11–12	Isabel	SAFE	SAFE	SAFE	SAFE	SAFE	SAFE	SAFE	SAFE	SAFE	SAFE	OUT							
11–12	Sarah	SAFE	SAFE	SAFE	SAFE	SAFE	SAFE	SAFE	SAFE	SAFE	LOW	OUT							
13	Florence	SAFE	SAFE	SAFE	SAFE	SAFE	SAFE	SAFE	SAFE	SAFE	SAFE	OUT							
14–15	Natascha	SAFE	SAFE	SAFE	SAFE	SAFE	LOW	SAFE	SAFE	OUT									
14–15	Paulina	SAFE	SAFE	SAFE	SAFE	SAFE	SAFE	SAFE	SAFE	OUT									
16	Tahnee	SAFE	SAFE	SAFE	SAFE	SAFE	SAFE	SAFE	OUT										
17	Simone	SAFE	SAFE	SAFE	SAFE	SAFE	SAFE	SAFE	OUT										
18	Franziska	SAFE	SAFE	SAFE	LOW	SAFE	OUT												
19	Amira	SAFE	SAFE	SAFE	SAFE	OUT													
20	Christien	SAFE	SAFE	LOW	OUT														
21	Ivon	SAFE	SAFE	OUT															
22	Concetta	SAFE	SAFE	OUT															
23	Valerie	SAFE	SAFE	QUIT															
24–25	Chiara	SAFE	OUT																
24–25	Lilia	SAFE	OUT																

The contestant was eliminated outside of judging panel
The contestant quit the competition
The contestant was immune from elimination
The contestant was one of the best this week.
The contestant was in danger of elimination
The contestant was eliminated
The contestant won the competition

=== Photo shoot guide ===
- Episode 2 photo shoot: Natural and makeup beauty shots
- Episode 3 photo shoot: Horror in London underworld
- Episode 4 photo shoot: High voltage
- Episode 5 photo shoot: Orgy in hotel suite
- Episode 6 photo shoot: Bond Girl in helicopter
- Episode 7 photo shoot: Cirque du Soleil
- Episode 8 photo shoot: Hot fire couple
- Episode 10 photo shoot: Dirty dancing
- Episode 11 photo shoot: Rococo mother-hipsters
- Episode 12 commercial: Shoes commercial
- Episode 13 photo shoot: Underwater nymphs
- Episode 14 photo shoot: Beauty shots with bees
- Episode 15 photo shoot: Cosmopolitan covers

== Controversies ==
The show hit US-American news when the mansion in Los Angeles in which the final 15 competitors were supposed to live burnt down one day before filming, with firefighter Glenn Allen being killed. A new mansion was found immediately without a significant delay in production.
