= Germany's Next Topmodel season 7 =

Germany's Next Topmodel
- Season 7
- Judges: Heidi Klum; Thomas Hayo; Thomas Rath
- No. of contestants: 25
- Winner: Luisa Hartema
- No. of episodes: 16

Release
- Original network: ProSieben
- Original release: 23 February – 7 June 2012

Season chronology
- ← Previous; Season 6 Next → Season 8

The seventh season of Germany's Next Topmodel aired on German television network ProSieben from 23 February to 7 June 2012.

The judging panel remains unchanged since the previous season, which consists of Thomas Hayo and fashion designer Thomas Rath.

As in the last preceding year, this season featured a preselection without open castings. The first episode started with 50 semifinalists.

The winner of the competition was 17-year-old Luisa Hartema from Leer. Her prizes include:

- A contract with Günther Klum's OneEins GmbH Management.
- A cover and spread in the German edition of Cosmopolitan
- An advertising campaign for Emmi AG, Maybelline New York, and Zalando
- A limited-time apartment stay in a fashion capital of her choice from Gillette Venus
- An Opel Corsa

The international destinations for this season were set in Phuket, Los Angeles, New York, San Diego, Tahiti, Cancún and Paris.

Fourth placer Kasia Lenhardt died in 2021.

== Contestants ==
(ages stated are at start of contest)

Contestant	Age	Height	Hometown	Finish	Place
Romina Djurovic	16	1.77 m (5 ft 9 1/2 in)	Bettendorf	Episode 2	25–23
Laura Wittek	18	1.76 m (5 ft 9 1/2 in)	Groß-Gerau	Episode 2	25–23
Abiba Makoya Bakayoko	18	1.78 m (5 ft 10 in)	Berlin	Episode 2	25–23
Isabell Janku	16	1.75 m (5 ft 9 in)	Munich	Episode 3	22–19
Sabine Snobl	19	1.83 m (6 ft 0 in)	Strømmen, Norway	Episode 3	22–19
Valerie-Charlotte Kirchner von Schröder	19	1.75 m (5 ft 9 in)	Hamburg	Episode 3	22–19
Franziska Pöhling	18	1.77 m (5 ft 9 1/2 in)	Oldenburg	Episode 3	22–19
Anelia Moor	19	1.74 m (5 ft 8 1/2 in)	Rosenheim	Episode 4	18
Michelle Luise Lafleur	17	1.71 m (5 ft 7 1/2 in)	Regensburg	Episode 5	17–16
Natalia Kowalczykowska	20	1.77 m (5 ft 9 1/2 in)	Kitzingen	Episode 5	17–16
Maxi Böttcher	17	1.72 m (5 ft 7 1/2 in)	Roßtal	Episode 6	15
Jasmin Abraha	17	1.77 m (5 ft 9 1/2 in)	Baden-Baden	Episode 7	14
Annabelle Rieß	23	1.75 m (5 ft 9 in)	Berlin	Episode 8	13
Melek Civantürk	20	1.75 m (5 ft 9 in)	Stuttgart	Episode 9	12
Shawny Sander	17	1.72 m (5 ft 7 1/2 in)	Berlin	Episode 10	11
Laura Scharnagl	17	1.76 m (5 ft 9 1/2 in)	Tirschenreuth	Episode 11	10
Inga Bobkow	17	1.73 m (5 ft 8 in)	Berlin	Episode 11	9
Lisa Volz	20	1.73 m (5 ft 8 in)	Saarbrücken	Episode 12	8
Diana Ovchinnikova	17	1.74 m (5 ft 8 1/2 in)	Hagen	Episode 13	7 (quit)
Evelyn Keck	18	1.78 m (5 ft 10 in)	Bad Neustadt	Episode 14	6 (quit)
Sara Kulka	21	1.74 m (5 ft 8 1/2 in)	Leipzig	Episode 15	5
Katarzyna 'Kasia' Lenhardt †	16	1.73 m (5 ft 8 in)	Berlin	Episode 16	4
Dominique Miller	22	1.75 m (5 ft 9 in)	Mannheim	Episode 16	3
Sarah-Anessa Hitzschke	18	1.78 m (5 ft 10 in)	Hannover	Episode 16	2
Luisa Hartema	17	1.78 m (5 ft 10 in)	Leer	Episode 16	1

== Episode summaries ==
No. overall	No. in season	Title	Original release date
88	1	"50 Girls"	23 February 2012
The competition began with 50 semi-finalists, along with wildcard Melek Civantürk, who reached the finals of the previous cycle but withdrew after being diagnosed with cancer. After interviews with the judges, 20 of them were eliminated, and the remaining 30 walked in a fashion show for Guido Maria Kretschmer. Luisa, Melek and Natalia were chosen to open the fashion show, and Luisa was chosen to close it. Afterwards, five more contestants were eliminated, and the remaining 25 receive the news that the next round of the competition would take place in Thailand.
89	2	"Thailand"	1 March 2012
After arriving in Thailand, the finalists were set a challenge in which they had to walk in Asian outfits. Following this, they flew to Phuket, and the winners of the challenge, Lisa and Dominique, flew first class with Heidi Klum. In Phuket, the contestants did a photo shoot on a beach à la Sports Illustrated (where Evelyn, Sara, Luisa and Kasia performed best) and for their next challenge shot a commercial for Asian food. The winners of the challenge were Annabelle and Sara, and they won a night in Bangkok. For the live walk, the contestants modeled designs by Tube Gallery. Abiba, Laura W. and Romina were the first contestants to be eliminated.: First challenge winner: Dominique Miller & Lisa Volz; Second challenge winner: Annabelle Rieß & Sara Kulka; Eliminated: Abiba Bakayoko, Laura Wittek & Romina Djurovic; Featured photographer: Derek Kettela
90	3	"Berlin Fashion Week"	8 March 2012
The girls do Thai dance, with Melek winning the challenge to perform a choreography. They then go to castings for Berlin Fashion Week. At the casting for Kaviar Gauche Shawny performs best and gets booked for the show. After the show the girls have a photo shoot for German Gala. Kasia, Anelia and Michelle Luise are deemed best. Afterwards the girls go to a casting for judge Thomas Rath. Luisa, Sarah-Anessa, Natalia, Shawny, Inga and Annabelle are booked for the show that is already Shawny's second job. Although Heidi is absent at panel Valerie-Charlotte, Franziska, Sabine and Isabell are eliminated.: Challenge winner: Melek Civantürk; Booked for job: Shawny Sander (x2), Luisa Hartema, Sarah-Anessa Hitzschke, Natalia Kowalczykowska, Inga Bobkow & Annabelle Rieß; Eliminated: Franziska Poehling, Isabell Janku, Sabine Snobl & Valerie-Charlotte Kirchner von Schröder; Featured clients: Broadway NYC Fashion Magazine, Kaviar Gauche, Thomas Rath
91	4	"A dream comes true: Hollywood is waiting"	15 March 2012
The week starts with a challenge the girls have to get perfect make-up while they are sitting in a drifting car. Kasia and Luisa are declared to winners. At home the girls have an emotions training with Michelle Rodriguez. At the photo shoot Melek, Evelyn, Sarah-Anessa, Sara and Anelia struggle. At panel Anelia, Jasmin and Sarah-Anessa struggle on the runway this making them land in the bottom three. Anelia gets eliminated for failing at both; photo shoot and runway.: Challenge winner: Luisa Hartema & Kasia Lenhardt; Wall of fame: Shawny Sander; Bottom three: Anelia Moor, Jasmin Abraha & Sarah-Anessa Hitzschke; Eliminated: Anelia Moor; Featured photographer: Rankin; Special guest: Anne Vyalitsyna & Michelle Rodriguez
92	5	"The L.A. animal shooting"	22 March 2012
In the beginning the girls have their makeover where Natalia refuses her makeover and annoys the judges. Sarah-Anessa starts crying when her hair is dyed from blond to black. The girls have a photo shoot with lizards. Michelle Luise is deemed worst while Sarah-Anessa, Luisa, Lisa and Diana perform best. At a casting for an editorial for Broadway NYC Fashion Kasia, Luisa, Dominique, Sarah-Anessa, Maxi, Annabelle and Shawny reach the second round. In the end it's a race head to head between Kasia and Annabelle resulting in Annabelle's second job. At panel the girls have to choose their styling, outfit and music themselves. While Dominique is deemed best for her outfit, Sarah-Anessa has the best walk and music thus making her get a place at the wall of fame. Michelle Luise and Jasmin land in the first bottom two where Michelle Luise gets eliminated because of her bad photo shoot, walk and outfit. Melek and Natalia land in the second bottom two resulting in Natalias elimination.: Booked for job: Annabelle Rieß; Wall of fame: Sarah-Anessa Hitzschke; First bottom two: Michelle Luise Lafleur & Jasmin Abraha; First eliminated: Michelle Luise Lafleur; Second bottom two: Melek Civantürk & Natalia Kowalczykowska; Second eliminated: Natalia Kowalczykowska; Featured photographer: Robert Erdman; Featured client: Broadway NYC Fashion
93	6	"It go high up, Irish Dancing"	29 March 2012
The girls have a casting for Emmi AG where Luisa, Diana, Kasia, Inga and Lisa reach the second round where Diana is booked for her first job and thus travels to Tahiti for the job. At the photo shoot Luisa and Sarah-Anessa perform best and go to amfAR gala with Heidi wearing dresses designed by Roberto Cavalli whom the girls met before the gala. The other girls train Irish Dancing with guest judge Coco Rocha where Dominique and Melek perform best. Sara is also noticed for practicing until midnight what she is praised for by the judges. The girls do Irish Dancing instead of catwalk. Maxi is eliminated after denigrating Diana and a bad performance at panel.: Booked for job: Diana Ovchinnikova; Wall of fame: Evelyn Keck; Eliminated: Maxi Böttcher; Featured photographer: Warwick Saint; Special guest: Coco Rocha; Featured client: Emmi AG
94	7	"Rock-star shooting, NY Fashion Week"	5 April 2012
The photo shoot is about Stage diving where no girls performs bad. Luisa, Inga and Evelyn are invited to New York Fashion Week castings. The three girls meet Elsa Hosk, who notes that Luisa has huge potential, at a training for castings as well as Toni Garrn and Doutzen Kroes at a gala. Tara Subkoff books Luisa for her presentation. At a casting for Jad Ghandour's fashion show Luisa performs best and is booked for his show. She is also chosen to open and to close his show and to shoot the look book. Afterwards the girls go to a casting for Korto Momolu, the runner-up of Project Runway (season 5) who books all three girls, Luisa, Inga and Evelyn, for her presentation. Back in LA the girls have to walk in High Fashion outfits where Jasmin is deemed worst and therefore eliminated. Luisa gets a place at the wall of fame because of her three jobs and great photo. The remaining girls travel to Cancun.: Booked for job: Luisa Hartema (x3), Evelyn Keck & Inga Bobkow; Wall of fame: Luisa Hartema; Eliminated: Jasmin Abraha; Featured photographers: Anders Hallberg, Marc Baptiste, & Seth Sabal; Special guests:Bill KAULITZ Doutzen Kroes, Elsa Hosk, Korto Momolu, Tara Subkoff, & Toni Garrn; Featured clients: Jhad Ghandour, Korto Momolu, & Tara Subkoff
95	8	"Amazons"	12 April 2012
This week the girls have to play the role of Amazons where Dominique and Lisa are deemed best and Diana and Shawny are deemed worst. At a casting for German Cosmopolitan the girls have to dance in pairs. Luisa and Shawny are booked. This week's challenge is to design a traditional Mexican outfit. In the end it's a race head to head between Sara and Evelyn with Sara winning the challenge. Annabelle struggles on the runway and lands in the bottom two along with Diana. In the end Annabelle is eliminated.: Challenge winner: Sara Kulka; Booked for job: Luisa Hartema & Shawny Sander; Wall of fame: Dominique Miller; Bottom two: Annabelle Rieß & Diana Ovchinnikova; Eliminated: Annabelle Rieß; Special guest: Erin Wasson; Featured client: Cosmopolitan Germany
96	9	"Fashion show in Mexico"	19 April 2012
All the girls are booked for the show of Mexican designer Lydia Lavin. She has to decide between Melek, Lisa and Dominique who's going to wear the wedding dress. In the end Lisa is chosen. At the show Evelyn, Kasia and Luisa stumble while Lisa is deemed best. In this week's photo shoot the girls have to jump out of a burning house. Melek, Kasia and Luisa are deemed worst while Lisa performs best. At a casting for Opel Sara reaches the second round for the first time along with Lisa and Inga. In the end Lisa wins the casting. At panel Sara reveals that she has worked in a Strip club because of financial problems. The girls have to walk in lingerie and with balloons à la Victoria's Secret. While Diana, Evelyn, Dominique and Lisa perform best on the runway Melek, Kasia and Luisa struggle. Kasia even thinks about leaving the competition. Though, Melek gets eliminated for her lack of sexiness. Judge Thomas Rath has to choose three girls he takes to Paris. He chooses Evelyn and Diana for their great walks and Luisa in spite of her weak week because of her huge potential. Heidi admits to having rather sent Lisa, Dominique or Sarah-Anessa to Paris. Lisa gets on the Wall of Fame because of her almost perfect week.: Booked for job & wall of fame: Lisa Volz; Eliminated: Melek Civantürk; Featured client & special guest: Lydia Lavin
97	10	"Paris"	26 April 2012
The three girls that have been picked the week before go to a casting for Claudine Ivari's show at Paris Fashion Week. Luisa is the only one to be booked. The other girls are doing sports with Heidi. At the photo shoot Luisa, Dominique, Sara, Kasia and Laura perform best while only Shawny struggles. At panel Laura struggles on the runway thus making her land in the bottom two along with Shawny. In the end Shawny gets eliminated even though Shawny has been cast for three jobs already and Laura didn't get a single one, but because Laura has been much stronger on the runway than Shawny at the photo shoot. Kasia lands on the Wall of Fame although Luisa was booked for Paris Fashion Week and had a great week.: Booked for job: Luisa Hartema; Challenge winner & immune from elimination: Dominique Miller; Wall of fame: Kasia Lenhardt; Bottom two: Laura Scharnagl & Shawny Sander; Eliminated: Shawny Sander; Featured photographer: Kristian Schuller; Featured client & special guest: Claudine Ivari
98	11	"Molotow-Cocktail"	3 May 2012
The girls have a runway training with Naomi Campbell. The judges surprised the girls when telling them one girl will be eliminated outside the judging panel. Laura, Sarah-Anessa and Inga land in the bottom three. Laura is eliminated. The girls film a video where they have to dodge a molotow-cocktail in matrix-style. Luisa, Evelyn and Lisa win the challenge to mix different kind of styles to create a new fashion relevant one. At panel Inga is eliminated for always being average.: First bottom three: Inga Bobkow, Laura Scharnagl & Sarah-Anessa Hitzschke; Eliminated outside of panel: Laura Scharnagl; Wall of fame: Dominique Miller; Second bottom two: Inga Bobkow & Lisa Volz; Eliminated: Inga Bobkow; Special guest: Naomi Campbell
99	12	"Toothpaste, Animals and Robots"	10 May 2012
The week starts with a casting for blend-a-med. Luisa, Dominique, Kasia, Sarah-Anessa and Diana reach the second round. Dominique wins the casting and is booked for a commercial. This week the girls have a bodypainting photo shoot. Luisa, Kasia, Evelyn and Sara are deemed best while Sarah-Anessa, Diana and Dominique struggle. Sarah-Anessa, Diana, Sara are chosen to be interviewed in E! Entertainment News. Kasia wins this week's challenge to pose with robots and chooses Sara to share her price. At panel the girls have a press training after the runway. Sara performs best at the training while Dominique struggles. In the end Lisa is eliminated for not being edgy enough. Sara and Diana land in the bottom two, but are both saved.: Booked for job: Dominique Miller; Challenge winner & wall of fame: Kasia Lenhardt; Bottom three: Diana Ovchinnikova, Sara Kulka & Lisa Volz; First eliminated: Lisa Volz; Second eliminated: None; Featured client: Blend-A-Med/Procter & Gamble
100	13	"Kickboxing and Mermaids"	17 May 2012
The remaining seven girls have to organize a fashion show, where Dominique is deemed best while Diana is criticized for her body, especially for her hips once again. The girls have a casting for German Shape. Sara and Kasia are the last two, with Sara booked for the job. At the photo shoot the girls have to pose as mermaids between dead fish. All the girls do a great job. At panel Diana quits the competition because of problems in her family. Luisa struggles on the runway and is not deemed best for the first time since almost five weeks. But she isn't eliminated due to her huge potential and her fantastic photo. Sara lands on the wall of fame for the first time.: Challenge winner: Dominique Miller; Booked for job: Sara Kulka; Quit: Diana Ovchinnikova; Wall of fame: Sara Kulka; Eliminated: None; Featured photographer: Enrique Badulescu; Special guest: Carolyn Murphy; Featured client: Shape Germany
101	14	"Underwater Shooting"	30 May 2013
In the beginning Evelyn quits the competition because of a severe disease in her family. Heidi mentioned she was sure Evelyn would reach the final. This week's casting is for Gillette Venus. Kasia, Luisa, Sarah-Anessa and Sara reach the second round. Luisa and Sarah-Anessa each are booked for the commercial. Luisa is chosen to play the main role. This is also Luisa's seventh job, what makes her the German 'Next Topmodel' contestant with the highest number of jobs during the show, followed by Jolina Fust from cycle 9 and Janina Schmidt and Christina Leibold from cycle 3. Thomas Hayo does a photo shoot with the girls to teach them how to do jumping poses in fashion editorials with the assistance of Jessica Gomes. At this week's underwater photo shoot the girls have to pose with a male model. All the girls perform well. At panel Dominique and Sara land in the bottom two but are not eliminated. Sarah-Anessa advances to the final even though she only got two jobs while Luisa was booked for her seventh job this week, is the cycle's catwalk queen and praised for her huge potential all the time.: Quit: Evelyn Keck; Booked for job: Luisa Hartema & Sarah-Anessa Hitzschke; Bottom two: Dominique Miller & Sara Kulka; Eliminated: None; Advanced to finale: Sarah-Anessa Hitzschke; Special guest: Jessica Gomes; Featured client: Gillette Venus
102	15	"Cosmopolitan Cover"	31 May 2012
The girls do a photo shoot for German Cosmopolitan, which is one of the winning prices. All girls do a good job while Dominique excels. They have a runway training with Miranda Kerr, who says the girls have been handpicked very well and also notes that Luisa has huge potential. The top 5 walk features three different walks at panel; the girls have to convince walking Prêt-à-Porter, Avantgarde and Haute Couture. Sarah-Anessa had already been placed in the final last week, but the judges feel like she still delivered the best walks. Luisa also reaches the final. Sara is eliminated, which doesn't come as a surprise, with even Sara saying she will be eliminated before. Kasia is the third girl to reach the final although she had not been booked for a job this season, making this the first time a girl with no job reaches the final. Dominique starts crying when Kasia returns as a finalist but Dominique, who is called out alone is also able to reach the final, what marks the first time there are four finalists. In the end, the four finalists are called out again and the jury reveals that they each won a new Opel Corsa.: Immune from elimination: Sarah-Anessa Hitzschke; Eliminated: Sara Kulka; Special guest: Miranda Kerr & Petra Gessulat
103	16	"Final at the Lanxess Arena"	7 June 2012
Kasia is eliminated first after a quick change fashion show, with only the four finalists walking. After an online voting between the girls, who did not reach the final, Sara is chosen to open the top-18-walk. After the walk Dominique is eliminated leaving Luisa and Sarah-Anessa. To nobody's surprise Luisa, who has the biggest fan base, wins due to her huge potential, being the cycle's catwalk-queen and most photogenic girl and having been booked for the highest number of jobs in Germany's Next Topmodel's history.: Final four: Dominique Miller, Kasia Lenhardt, Luisa Hartema & Sarah-Anessa Hitzschke; Eliminated: Kasia Lenhardt; Top 18 walk opener: Sara Kulka; Final three: Dominique Miller, Luisa Hartema & Sarah-Anessa Hitzschke; Eliminated: Dominique Miller; Final two: Luisa Hartema & Sarah-Anessa Hitzschke; Germany's Next Topmodel: Luisa Hartema; Special guests: Gossip, Ivy Quainoo, Justin Bieber, & Maroon 5

== Summaries ==
=== Results table ===
Place	Model	Episodes																	
Place	Model	2	3	4	5	6	7	8	9	10 (Note: In episode 10, Dominique won the challenge and was granted immunity from elimination.)	11 (Note: In episode 11, Laura S. was eliminated outside of panel for her poor performance during the runway training.)		12	13 (Note: In episode 13, Diana decided to quit the competition, that resulted in a non-elimination.)	14 (Note: In episode 14, Evelyn decided to quit the competition, which resulted in another non-elimination. Sarah-Anessa immediately advanced to the finals; automatically granting her immunity from the two remaining eliminations before the live finale.)	15	16		
1	Luisa	SAFE	SAFE	SAFE	SAFE	SAFE	HIGH	SAFE	SAFE	SAFE	SAFE	SAFE	SAFE	SAFE	SAFE	SAFE	SAFE	SAFE	WIN
2	Sarah-Anessa	SAFE	SAFE	LOW	HIGH	SAFE	SAFE	SAFE	SAFE	SAFE	LOW	SAFE	SAFE	SAFE	IMM	IMM	SAFE	LOW	OUT
3	Dominique	SAFE	SAFE	SAFE	SAFE	SAFE	SAFE	HIGH	SAFE	IMM	SAFE	HIGH	SAFE	SAFE	LOW	LOW	LOW	OUT	
4	Kasia	SAFE	LOW	SAFE	SAFE	SAFE	SAFE	SAFE	SAFE	HIGH	SAFE	SAFE	HIGH	SAFE	SAFE	SAFE	OUT		
5	Sara	SAFE	LOW	SAFE	SAFE	SAFE	SAFE	SAFE	SAFE	SAFE	SAFE	SAFE	LOW	HIGH	LOW	OUT			
6	Evelyn	SAFE	SAFE	SAFE	SAFE	HIGH	SAFE	SAFE	SAFE	SAFE	SAFE	SAFE	SAFE	SAFE	QUIT				
7	Diana	SAFE	SAFE	SAFE	SAFE	SAFE	SAFE	LOW	SAFE	SAFE	SAFE	SAFE	LOW	QUIT					
8	Lisa	SAFE	SAFE	SAFE	SAFE	SAFE	SAFE	SAFE	HIGH	SAFE	SAFE	LOW	OUT						
9	Inga	SAFE	SAFE	SAFE	SAFE	SAFE	SAFE	SAFE	SAFE	SAFE	LOW	OUT							
10	Laura S.	SAFE	SAFE	SAFE	SAFE	SAFE	SAFE	SAFE	SAFE	LOW	OUT								
11	Shawny	SAFE	SAFE	HIGH	SAFE	SAFE	SAFE	SAFE	SAFE	OUT									
12	Melek	SAFE	SAFE	SAFE	LOW	SAFE	SAFE	SAFE	OUT										
13	Annabelle	SAFE	SAFE	SAFE	SAFE	SAFE	SAFE	OUT											
14	Jasmin	SAFE	SAFE	LOW	LOW	SAFE	OUT												
15	Maxi	SAFE	SAFE	SAFE	SAFE	OUT													
16–17	Michelle Luise	SAFE	SAFE	SAFE	OUT														
16–17	Natalia	SAFE	SAFE	SAFE	OUT														
18	Anelia	SAFE	SAFE	OUT															
19–22	Franziska	SAFE	OUT																
19–22	Isabell	SAFE	OUT																
19–22	Sabine	SAFE	OUT																
19–22	Valerie-Charlotte	SAFE	OUT																
23–25	Abiba	OUT																	
23–25	Laura W.	OUT																	
23–25	Romina	OUT																	

The contestant quit the competition
The contestant was immune from elimination
The contestant won the wall of fame photo
The contestant was in danger of elimination
The contestant was eliminated
The contestant won the competition

=== Photo shoot guide ===
- Episode 2 photo shoot: Bikini shots in Thailand
- Episode 4 photo shoot: Girl's night out with Heidi Klum
- Episode 5 photo shoot: Beauty shot with reptiles
- Episode 6 photo shoot: Suspended in the air
- Episode 7 photo shoot: Stage diving rock stars
- Episode 8 photo shoot: Jungle warriors
- Episode 9 photo shoot: Jumping outside a burning house
- Episode 10 photo shoot: Flying parachutes couture
- Episode 11 video shoot: High end fashion film
- Episode 12 photo shoot: Animal body paint
- Episode 13 photo shoot: Mermaids
- Episode 14 photo shoot: Underwater romance
- Episode 15 photo shoot: Surprised photo shoot
