= Sara Nuru =

German fashion model

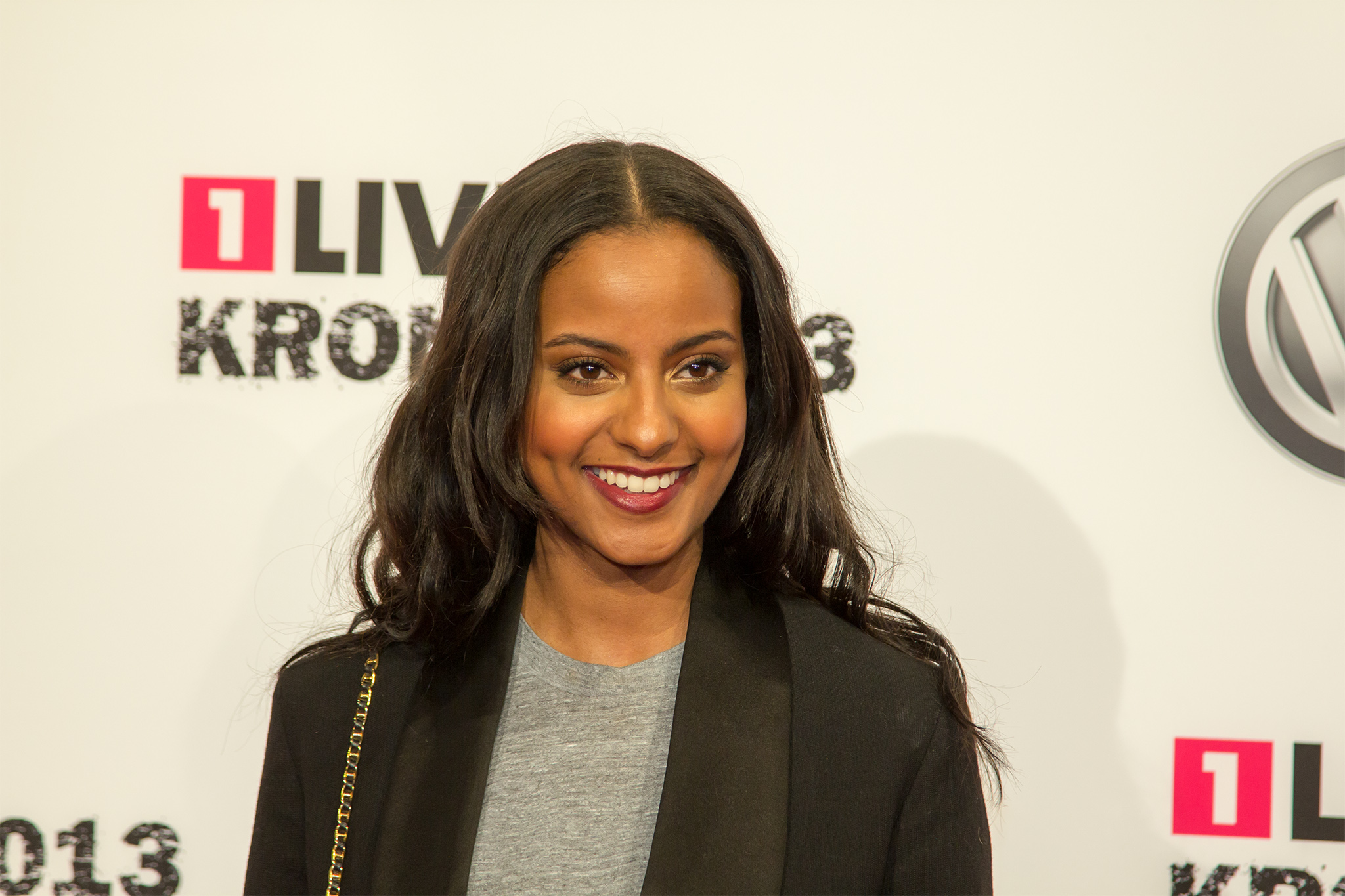
- Nuru in 2013
- Born: Sara Nuru; 19 August 1989 (age 37); Erding, Bavaria, West Germany (now Germany)
- Children: 1
- Modeling information
- Height: 1.76 m (5 ft 9 in)
- Hair color: Black
- Eye color: Brown
- Website: saranuru.com

Sara Nuru (born 19 August 1989) is a German fashion model and entrepreneur. She was the winner of the fourth cycle of Germany's Next Top Model.

Since 2016, Nuru has been running nuruCoffee, a fair trade coffee company, and supporting Ethiopian women with microcredits through her non-profit nuruWomen.

== Early life ==
Nuru's parents are Ethiopian emigrants of Tigray and Amhara ethnic heritage. Her mother, Mulu is a Christian and her father, Hussein is Muslim. She has two sisters.

In 1999 Nuru moved to Munich with her family. She speaks four languages: German, English, Arabic and a little bit of Amharic, her parents' native language.

== Career ==
During high school, a friend of Nuru's persuaded her to participate in the fourth cycle casting of Germany's Next Topmodel in Munich. Nuru was chosen as one of the finalists and won jobs for Sony Ericsson and Gillette during the competition. On 21 May 2009, Nuru was announced as the fourth cycle's winner and the first Ethiopian winner. Unlike the three previous winners of Germany's Next Topmodel, Nuru did not win a modeling contract with IMG Models, but with the Heidi Klum GmbH, whose manager is Heidi's father Günther Klum.

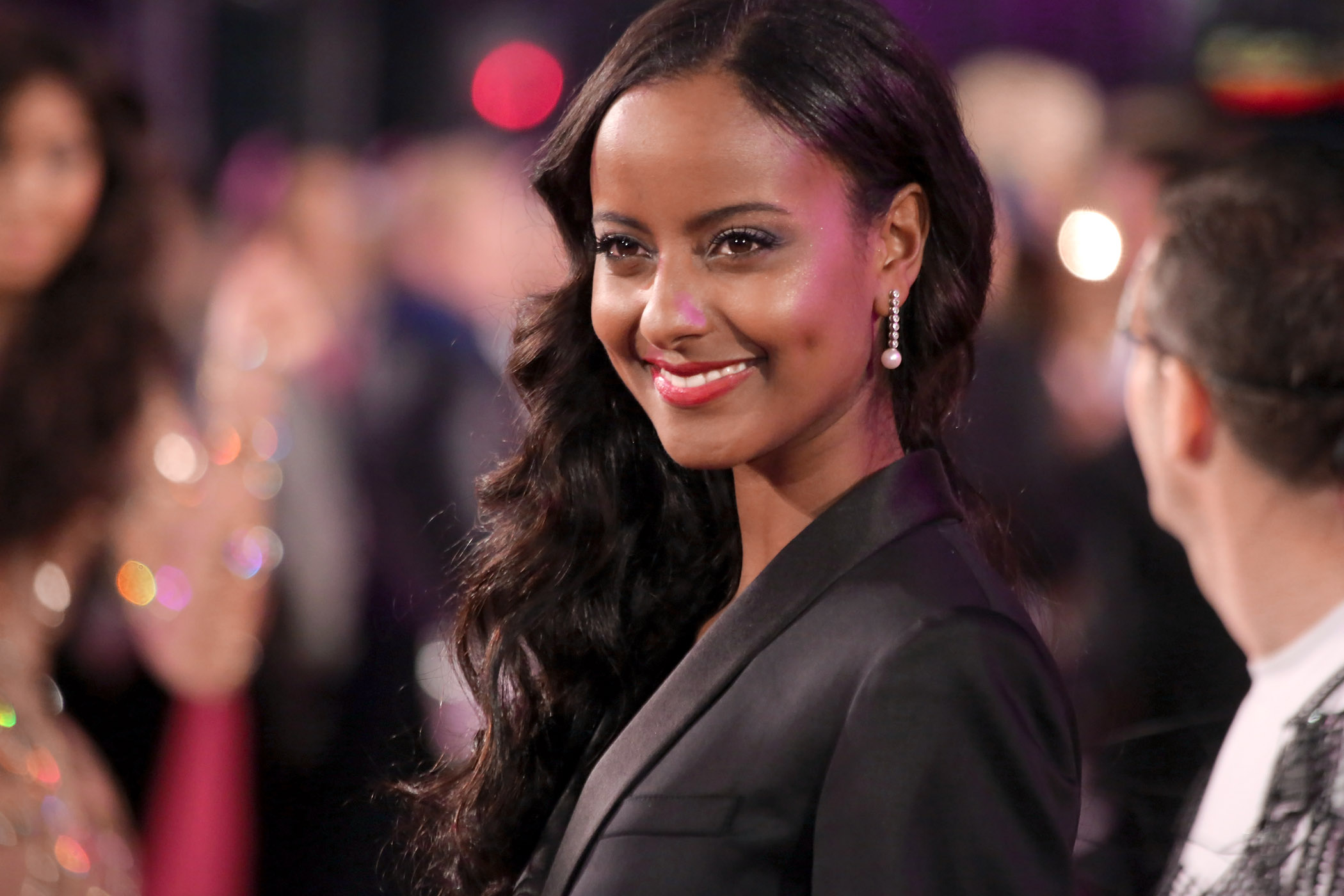
Nuru at the Life Ball 2013

Before Nuru won Germany's Next Topmodel, she had already been given the opportunity to gain experience as a model for friendly designers after she was approached by a photographer when she was 15 years old. She appeared in a fashion show held in Dresden which also featured cycle 3's winner Jennifer Hof.

In 2009, Nuru started a modeling career. She walked in shows in London Fashion Week London, New York Fashion Week New York, Milan Fashion Week Milan and Berlin Fashion Week Berlin, such as Escada Laurèl, Guido Maria Kretschmer, Gant, Cesar Galindo NY, Custo Barcelona and Roberto Cavalli.

In September 2022 she joined the criticism of Germany's Next Topmodel as she said: "I was not aware of how blatantly young women were treated there. It was as if I had blinders on, a lot is me I wasn't aware of it even as a participant. I'm still horrified by how young women are treated." She added: "With the knowledge I have today, I would not take part in Germany's Next Topmodel again."

== Philanthropy ==
Since 2012, Nuru has been an ambassador for Karlheinz Böhm's charity Menschen für Menschen, with a focus on Ethiopia. In 2018, Germany's Minister for Economic Cooperation and Development Gerd Müller appointed her as Special Ambassador for Sustainable Consumption and Production. She also works with advocacy and campaigning organization ONE.

Achievements
Preceded by Jennifer Hof	Germany's Next Topmodel winner Cycle 4 (2009)	Succeeded by Alisar Ailabouni
