= Switzerland's Next Topmodel =

Swiss reality TV series

- Genre: Reality television
- Created by: Tyra Banks
- Presented by: Manuela Frey
- Judges: Manuela Frey (1 - 3); Papis Loveday (1, 3 ) Dandy Diary (1); Zoe Pastelle (2); Larissa Marolt (3)
- Opening theme: Robin Schulz & Marc Scibilia – "Unforgettable" (1); Rita Ora – "New Look" (2); Jane & The Boy – "OMW" (3)
- Country of origin: Switzerland
- No. of seasons: 3
- No. of episodes: 22

Production
- Running time: 120 mins

Original release
- Network: ProSieben Schweiz
- Release: 19 October 2018 – 12 November 2021

Switzerland's Next Topmodel is a Swiss reality television series and the second local adaptation based on Tyra Banks' America's Next Top Model after Supermodel which aired in 2007 and 2008 on the now defunct network 3+. The show sees a number of aspiring models compete against each other in a variety of competitions to determine who will win the title of Switzerland's Next Topmodel, among other prizes in hopes of a successful career in the modelling industry.

== History ==
Production of the show was officially announced in September 2017. Host and judges were announced in April 2018.

== Format ==
Coming from the same production company, both in general look and concept the show takes a lot of inspiration from Germany's Next Top Model. For the first season, the team format (being intact on GNTM since its eleventh season) was adapted with the judges acting as mentors for some parts of the contestants whereas the final say will exclusively be left to the decision of the host equalling the role of Heidi Klum on GNTM.

== Judges ==
Judges	Seasons		
Judges	1 (2018)	2 (2019)	3 (2021)
Judges	Host		
Manuela Frey	Main	Main	Main
Judging Panelists
Papis Loveday	Main	Guest	Main
Dandy Diary	Main		
Zoe Pastelle		Main	
Larissa Marolt			Main

== Cycles ==
Cycle	Premiere date	Winner	Runner-up	Other contestants in order of elimination	Number of contestants	International Destinations
1	19 October 2018	Saviour Chibueze Anosike	Marion Reber	Jérômie Repond & Livio Achermann DaSilva & Mauritius Loosli, Anna Schlüssel & Elizabeta Ljubić, Elena Egli & Valon Berisha & Vivienne Oesch, Lorenzo Boscardin, Vanessa Gosteli, Sandro Yves Wederv	13	Milan
2	18 October 2019	Gabriela Gisler	Luca Mähli	Tenzing Chötso Kangsar & Nicolas Kalbermatten, Sarah Bakri, Jonas Schaller, Stella Castelli & Philippe Van Thomas, David Beer & Jill Dietiker, Thomas Kunz & Nayla Joy Dubs	12	Berlin
3	8 September 2021	Dennis De Vree	Venance Amvame	Rhea Manz & Kristina Lazić, Leonardo da Silva & Sophia Plüss, Carlos Pinheiro, Raphael Gurschler, Aleksandra Popovic (quit), André Pacheco Marques & Lea von Lombardini, Ludwig Heskamp, Nadia Mascaro, Jeremy Baumann & Stella Kizildag, Lara Eggert (quit) & Luca Meier, Aldin Zahirovic	18	Naxos
