= Supermodel (disambiguation) =

A supermodel is a fashion model with a worldwide reputation.

Supermodel may also refer to:

- Supermodel (album), a 2014 album by Foster the People
- "Supermodel (You Better Work)", a song by RuPaul from the album Supermodel of the World (1993)
- "Supermodel" (Jill Sobule song), a song by Jill Sobule from the Clueless film soundtrack (1995)
- "Supermodel", a song by Lady Kash from the 2017 Indian film Graghanam
- "Supermodel" (Måneskin song), 2022
- "Supermodel", a song by SZA from the album Ctrl (2017)
- Supermodels (album), a 2023 album by Claud
- Supermodels (Romanian TV series) a 2015 reality-TV series
- Supermodel (Swiss TV series), a 2007 reality-TV series
- Super Model (film), a 2013 Hindi film
- Supermodel (film), a 2015 American film
- "Super Model", an episode of Aqua Teen Hunger Force

== See also ==
- Supermodelo
