= Switzerland's Next Topmodel season 3 =

Switzerland's Next Topmodel
- Season 3
- Judges: Manuela Frey; Papis Loveday; Larissa Marolt
- No. of contestants: 18
- Winner: Dennis de Vree
- No. of episodes: 10

Release
- Original network: ProSieben Schweiz
- Original release: 8 September – 12 November 2021

Season chronology
- ← Previous; Season 2

Switzerland's Next Topmodel season 3 is the third season of Switzerland's Next Topmodel (often abbreviated to SNTM). It aired on ProSieben Schweiz from September 2021. Like last season, the show introduces male models into the competition. The show is hosted by Topmodel Manuela Frey. The international destination is Naxos, Greece.

The winner will receive a modeling contract with Scout Model Agency, a cover and spread in Annabelle Magazine and a Opel Mokka-e. The winner of the competition was 24 year-old Dennis De Vree from Zürich

== Contestants ==
(ages stated are at start of contest)

Team	Contestant	Age	Height	Hometown	Finish	Place
-	Kristina Lazić	20	1.80 m (5 ft 11 in)	Zug	Episode 1	18-17
-	Rhea Manz	22	1.71 m (5 ft 7 1/2 in)	Valais	Episode 1	18-17
Papis	Sophia Plüss	18	1.81 m (5 ft 11 1/2 in)	Aargau	Episode 1	16
Larissa	Leonardo da Silva	25	1.78 m (5 ft 10 in)	Neuenhof	Episode 1	15
Papis	Carlos Pinheiro	24	1.84 m (6 ft 1/2 in)	Horgen	Episode 2	14
Larissa	Raphael Gurschler	19	1.87 m (6 ft 1 1/2 in)	Triesen, Liechtenstein	Episode 3	13
Papis	Aleksandra Popovic	19	1.75 m (5 ft 9 in)	Zürich	Episode 4	12 (quit)
Larissa	André Pacheco Marques	24	1.92 m (6 ft 3 1/2 in)	Luzern	Episode 4	11-10
Larissa	Lea von Lombardini	21	1.78 m (5 ft 10 in)	Zug	Episode 4	11-10
Larissa	Ludwig Heskamp	16	1.85 m (6 ft 1 in)	Lingen, Germany	Episode 5	9
Papis	Nadia Mascaro	26	1.67 m (5 ft 5 1/2 in)	Luzern	Episode 6	8
Papis	Jeremy Baumann	22	1.87 m (6 ft 1 1/2 in)	Bern	Episode 7	7-6
Papis	Stella Kızıldağ	26	1.72 m (5 ft 7 1/2 in)	Zürich	Episode 7	7-6
Papis	Lara Eggert	20	1.80 m (5 ft 11 in)	Lengnau	Episode 8	5 (quit)
Larissa	Luca Meier	22	1.84 m (6 ft 1/2 in)	Altdorf	Episode 8	4
Larissa	Aldin Zahirovic	20	1.85 m (6 ft 1 in)	Munich, Germany	Episode 9	3
Larissa	Venance Amvame	26	1.67 m (5 ft 5 1/2 in)	Olten	Episode 9	2
Papis	Dennis De Vree	24	1.91 m (6 ft 3 in)	Zürich	Episode 9	1

== Episode summaries ==
=== Episode 1 ===
Original airdate: 9 September 2021

The first episode of Switzerland's Next Topmodel was the casting episode.

From thousands of applicants, 18 boys and girls were flown to Naxos, Greece. They are welcomed into the competition by Swiss top model, Manuela Frey. Model and runway coach, Papis Loveday and winner of the first season of Austria's Next Topmodel, Larissa Marolt. The aspiring models to be began with their promo shoot. Based on that outcome two models were not chosen by Papis nor Larissa to be in their team.

- Eliminated outside judging panel: Kristina Lazić & Rhea Manz

After choosing the final teams the remaining contestants had to walk the runway. At panel two more models are eliminated, leaving fourteen to move on in the competition.

- First Eliminated: Sophia Plüss
- Bottom Two: André Marques & Leonardo da Silva
- Eliminated: Leonardo da Silva

=== Episode 2 ===
Original airdate: 15 September 2021

The models work in pairs for this week photoshoot. At panel Carlos is eliminated.

- Immune: Team Larissa
- Bottom Two: Carlos Pinheiro & Jeremy Baumann
- Eliminated: Carlos Pinheiro

=== Episode 3 ===
Original airdate: 22 September 2021

This week the contestants underwent their makeovers and shot their sed cards. At panel Raphael was eliminated.

- Bottom two: André Marques & Raphael Gurschler
- Eliminated: Raphael Gurschler

=== Episode 4 ===
Original airdate: 29 September 2021

- Quit: Aleksandra Popovic
- Booked for job: Aldin Zahirovic & Venance Amvame
- Bottom two: André Marques & Lea von Lombardini
- Eliminated: André Marques & Lea von Lombardini

=== Episode 5 ===
Original airdate: 7 October 2021

- Booked for job: Luca Meier & Venance Amvame
- Bottom two: Ludwig Heskamp & Nadia Mascaro
- Eliminated: Ludwig Heskamp

=== Episode 6 ===
Original airdate: 14 October 2021

- Bottom two: Nadia Mascaro & Stella Kızıldağ
- Eliminated: Nadia Mascaro

=== Episode 7 ===
Original airdate: 21 October 2021

- Booked for job: Dennis De Vree & Venance Amvame
- Bottom four: Jeremy Baumann, Lara Eggert, Luca Meier & Stella Kızıldağ
- Eliminated: Jeremy Baumann & Stella Kızıldağ

=== Episode 8 ===
Original airdate: 27 October 2012

- Quit: Lara Eggert
- Eliminated: Luca Meier

=== Episode 9 ===
Original airdate: 3 November 2021

- Top three: Aldin Zahirovic, Dennis De Vree & Venance Amvame
- Eliminated: Aldin Zahirovic
- Top two: Dennis De Vree & Venance Amvame
- Switzerland's Next Topmodel: Dennis De Vree

== Summaries ==
Place	Model	Episodes								
Place	Model	1 (Note: Episode 1 was the casting episode.)	2	3	4 (Note: In Episode 4, Aleksandra quit due to health reasons.)	5	6	7	8	9
1	Dennis	SAFE	SAFE	SAFE	IMM	SAFE	SAFE	SAFE	SAFE	WINNER
2	Venance	SAFE	IMM	SAFE	IMM	SAFE	SAFE	SAFE	SAFE	OUT
3	Aldin	SAFE	IMM	SAFE	SAFE	SAFE	SAFE	SAFE	SAFE	OUT
4	Luca	SAFE	IMM	SAFE	IMM	SAFE	SAFE	LOW	OUT	
5	Lara	SAFE	SAFE	SAFE	IMM	SAFE	SAFE	LOW	QUIT	
6-7	Jeremy	SAFE	LOW	SAFE	SAFE	SAFE	SAFE	OUT		
6-7	Stella	SAFE	SAFE	SAFE	IMM	SAFE	LOW	OUT		
8	Nadia	SAFE	SAFE	SAFE	SAFE	LOW	OUT			
9	Ludwig	SAFE	IMM	SAFE	SAFE	OUT				
10-11	Lea	SAFE	SAFE	SAFE	OUT					
10-11	André	LOW	IMM	LOW	OUT					
12	Aleksandra	SAFE	SAFE	SAFE	QUIT					
13	Raphael	SAFE	IMM	OUT						
14	Carlos	SAFE	OUT							
15	Leonardo	OUT								
16	Sophia	OUT								
17-18	Rhea	OUT								
17-18	Kristina	OUT								

The contestant was immune from elimination
The contestant was in danger of elimination
The contestant quit the competition
The contestant was eliminated outside of the judging panel
The contestant was eliminated
The contestant won the competition

=== Photo shoots ===
- Episode 1 photo shoot: Promo shoot
- Episode 2 photo shoot: Mystic Waters in Pairs
- Episode 3 photo shoot: Sedcard
- Episode 5 photo shoot: Nude with snake
- Episode 6 photo shoot: Posing in the height
- Episode 7 photo shoot: Ice & Glamour
- Episode 8 photo shoot: Annabelle magazine cover
