= Supermodel season 1 =

Supermodel
- Season 1
- Promotial photograph of the cast of season 1 of Supermodel
- Starring: Nadja Schildknecht; Yannick Aellen; Mike Karg
- No. of episodes: 8

Release
- Original network: 3+ TV
- Original release: 6 November – 25 December 2007

Season chronology
- Next → Season 2

The first season of Supermodel aired on the Swiss television channel 3+ from November to December 2007. The season was presented by Swiss former model, business woman and manager Nadja Schildknecht. The judging panel comprised Schildknecht, show and event producer and choreographer Yannick Aellen and celebrity hairstylist Mike Karg. From 1000 applicants, 100 candidates were invited to participate in the auditions, with 15 being selected as part of the final cast. A sixteenth finalist, 25-year-old Sabine, entered the competition in the fourth episode, having originally qualified for the finals in the first round but been unable to participate in the first two weeks due to illness.

The majority of the competition was filmed in Switzerland, mainly in Zürich. Parts of the season were filmed in Bangkok, Paris, London and New York City. The winner of the competition was 21-year-old Nathalie Güdel from Hünibach.

== Episodes ==
=== Episode 1: Das Casting ===
Original airdate: 6 November 2007

- Guest judge(s): Sabine Diethelm

=== Episode 2: Lofteinzug/Die ersten Shootings ===
Original airdate: 13 November 2007

- Quit: Rrezearta & Jessica
- Challenge winner(s): Tanya Krummenacher
- Eliminated: Mirjana, Milica & Alexandra
- Guest judge(s): Florian Beck

=== Episode 3: Ab nach Fernost ===
Original airdate: 20 November 2007

- Challenge winner(s): Gorana Markovic & Tanya Krummenacher
- Eliminated: Anastasiya
- Bottom three: Arina Mironkina, Erika & Noemi
- Eliminated: Noemi
- Featured photographer(s): James Muñoz, Philipp Müller
- Special guest(s): Take That & Charles Allen
- Guest judge(s): Philipp Müller

=== Episode 4: Emotion Pur ===
Original airdate: 27 November 2007

- Entered: Sabine
- Challenge winner(s): Sabine
- Eliminated: Erika
- Bottom three: Ivana Vujcic, Nathalie Güdel & Sabine
- Eliminated: Sabine
- Featured photographer(s): Pier Luigi Macor
- Special guest(s): Lisa Feldmann & Tommy Hilfiger
- Guest judge(s): Franziska Knuppe

=== Episode 5: Vive la France ===
Original airdate: 4 December 2007

- Challenge winner(s): Eliane Heutschi
- Eliminated: Aleksandra
- Bottom three: Arina Mironkina, Ivana Vujcic & Gorana Markovic
- Eliminated: Ivana Vujcic
- Featured photographer(s): Patrizio Di Renzo & Philipp Müller
- Special guest(s): Bea Petri
- Guest judge(s): Patrizio di Renzo & Ursula Knecht

=== Episode 6: Der letzte Schritt ===
Original airdate: 11 December 2007

- Challenge winner(s): Nathalie Güdel & Tanya Krummenacher
- Eliminated: Tanya Krummenacher
- Bottom three: Arina Mironkina, Eliane Heutschi & Nathalie Güdel
- Eliminated: Arina Mironkina
- Featured photographer(s): Diana Scheunemann
- Special guest(s): Sebastian "Baschi" Bürgin, Carl Hirschmann & Dominik Benigna
- Guest judge(s): Marcus Schenkenberg

=== Episode 7: Finale ===
Original airdate: 18 December 2007

- Final three: Eliane Heutschi, Gorana Markovic & Nathalie Güdel
- Eliminated: Eliane Heutschi
- Final two: Gorana Markovic & Nathalie Güdel
- Supermodel: Nathalie Güdel
- Featured photographer(s): Lozza, Joshua Jordan & James Muñoz
- Special guest(s): Marcus Schenkenberg, Nadine Strittmatter
- Guest judge(s): Sabine Diethelm

=== Episode 8: Best Of ===
Original airdate: 25 December 2007

This was the recap episode.

== Contestants ==
(ages stated are at start of contest)

| Contestant | Age | Height | Hometown | Finish | Place |
|---|---|---|---|---|---|
| Rrezearta | 17 | 1.76 m (5 ft 9 1/2 in) | Grosshöchstetten | Episode 2 | 16–15 (quit) |
| Jessica | 16 | 1.73 m (5 ft 8 in) | Winterthur | Episode 2 | 16–15 (quit) |
| Mirjana Reljic | 17 | 1.71 m (5 ft 7 1/2 in) | Buchs | Episode 2 | 14–12 |
| Milica Djordjevic | 21 | 1.80 m (5 ft 11 in) | Zürich | Episode 2 | 14–12 |
| Alexandra Krone | 19 | 1.71 m (5 ft 7 1/2 in) | Steffisburg | Episode 2 | 14–12 |
| Noemi Rubera | 15 | 1.74 m (5 ft 8 1/2 in) | Ehrendingen | Episode 3 | 11–10 |
| Anastasiya Chernichenko | 20 | 1.75 m (5 ft 9 in) | Auw | Episode 3 | 11–10 |
| Sabine Staubli | 25 | 1.81 m (5 ft 11 1/2 in) | Kriens | Episode 4 | 9–8 |
| Erika Weibel | 21 | 1.73 m (5 ft 8 in) | Bern | Episode 4 | 9–8 |
| Ivana Vujcic | 20 | 1.74 m (5 ft 8 1/2 in) | Basel | Episode 5 | 7–6 |
| Aleksandra Petrovic | 17 | 1.81 m (5 ft 11 1/2 in) | Schwyz | Episode 5 | 7–6 |
| Tanya Krummenacher | 21 | 1.73 m (5 ft 8 in) | Emmenbrücke | Episode 6 | 5–4 |
| Arina Mironkina | 16 | 1.71 m (5 ft 7 1/2 in) | Gerlafingen | Episode 6 | 5–4 |
| Eliane Heutschi | 20 | 1.72 m (5 ft 7 1/2 in) | Binz | Episode 7 | 3 |
| Gorana Markovic | 18 | 1.77 m (5 ft 9 1/2 in) | Laupen | Episode 7 | 2 |
| Nathalie Güdel | 20 | 1.78 m (5 ft 10 in) | Hünibach | Episode 7 | 1 |

== Summaries ==
=== Call-out order ===
Nadja's call-out order
| Order | Episodes | | | | | | | |
| Order | 1 | 2 | 3 | 4 | 5 | 6 | 7 | |
|---|---|---|---|---|---|---|---|---|
| 1 | Erika | Ivana | Eliane | Erika | Eliane | Gorana | Gorana | Nathalie |
| 2 | Arina | Mirjana | Tanya | Tanya | Aleksandra | Tanya | Nathalie | Gorana |
| 3 | Anastasiya | Anastasiya | Anastasiya | Eliane | Tanya | Nathalie | Eliane | |
| 4 | Rrezearta | Gorana | Ivana | Gorana | Nathalie | Eliane | | |
| 5 | Nathalie | Eliane | Gorana | Arina | Arina | Arina | | |
| 6 | Noemi | Nathalie | Nathalie | Aleksandra | Gorana | | | |
| 7 | Mirjana | Tanya | Aleksandra | Nathalie | Ivana | | | |
| 8 | Tanya | Noemi | Arina | Ivana | | | | |
| 9 | Ivana | Arina | Erika | Sabine | | | | |
| 10 | Aleksandra; Alexandra | Erika | Noemi | | | | | |
| 11 | Aleksandra; Alexandra | Alexandra | | | | | | |
| 12 | Eliane | Milica | | | | | | |
| 13 | Jessica | Aleksandra | | | | | | |
| 14 | Milica | Jessica; Rrezearta | | | | | | |
| 15 | Gorana | Jessica; Rrezearta | | | | | | |

The contestant quit the competition
The contestant was eliminated
The contestant won the competition

- Jessica and Rrezearta quit the competition at the beginning of episode 2.
- Sabine entered the competition in episode 4 and was eliminated in the same episode.

=== Photo shoot guide ===
- Episode 2 photo shoot: "Bikini in snow"
- Episode 3 photo shoot: "Maestrani couple shot" & "Bikini on the beach"
- Episode 4 photo shoot: "tears"
- Episode 5 photo shoot: "Haute Couture"
- Episode 6 photo shoot: "Uncle Ben's"
- Episode 7 photo shoot: "Featuring Marcus Schenkenberg"
