= Switzerland's Next Topmodel season 2 =

Switzerland's Next Topmodel
- Season 2
- Judges: Manuela Frey; Zoë Pastelle
- No. of contestants: 12
- Winner: Gabriela Gisler
- No. of episodes: 7

Release
- Original network: ProSieben Schweiz
- Original release: 18 October – 29 November 2019

Season chronology
- ← Previous; Season 1 Next → Season 3

Switzerland's Next Topmodel season 2 is the second season of Switzerland's Next Topmodel (often abbreviated to SNTM). It aired on ProSieben Schweiz from October to November 2019. Like last season, the show introduced a division of also male models have a change of winning the competition. The show was hosted by Topmodel Manuela Frey. The international destination was Berlin.

The winner will receive a modeling contract with Time Model Agency, a cover and spread in 20 Minuten Friday Magazine, a campaign for Nivea and a Nissan Micra.

The winner of the competition was 24 -year-old Gabriela Gisler from Luzern

== Contestants ==
(ages stated are at start of contest)

Contestant	Age	Height	Hometown	Finish	Place
Nicolas Kalbermatten	24	1.84 m (6 ft 1/2 in)	Brig	Episode 2	12-11
Tenzing Chötso Kangsar	23	1.70 m (5 ft 7 in)	Uznach	Episode 2	12-11
Sarah Bakri	21	1.70 m (5 ft 7 in)	Worblaufen	Episode 3	10
Jonas Schaller	17	1.78 m (5 ft 10 in)	Bern	Episode 4	9
Philippe van Thomas	26	1.84 m (6 ft 1/2 in)	Kloten	Episode 4	8-7
Stella-Sophia 'Stella' Castelli	21	1.72 m (5 ft 7 1/2 in)	Lucerne	Episode 4	8-7
David Beer	19	1.83 m (6 ft 0 in)	Zürich	Episode 5	6-5
Jill Dietiker	21	1.74 m (5 ft 8 1/2 in)	Zofingen	Episode 5	6-5
Thomas Kunz	21	1.84 m (6 ft 1/2 in)	Thayngen	Episode 6	4-3
Nayla Joy Dubs	20	1.73 m (5 ft 8 in)	Aesch	Episode 6	4-3
Luca Mähli	17	1.93 m (6 ft 4 in)	Arth-Goldau	Episode 6	2
Gabriela Gisler	24	1.72 m (5 ft 7 1/2 in)	Luzern	Episode 6	1

== Results table ==
Place	Model	Episodes							
Place	Model	1 (Note: Episode 1 was the casting episode where 20 semi finalist were narrowed down to the top 12.)	2	3	4		5	6	
1	Gabriela	SAFE	SAFE	SAFE	SAFE	SAFE	SAFE	LOW	WINNER
2	Luca	SAFE	SAFE	SAFE	SAFE	SAFE	SAFE	SAFE	OUT
3-4	Nayla Joy	SAFE	SAFE	SAFE	SAFE	SAFE	SAFE	OUT	
3-4	Thomas	SAFE	SAFE	SAFE	SAFE	SAFE	SAFE	OUT	
5-6	David	SAFE	SAFE	SAFE	SAFE	LOW	OUT		
5-6	Jill	SAFE	SAFE	SAFE	LOW	SAFE	OUT		
7-8	Philippe	SAFE	SAFE	SAFE	SAFE	OUT			
7-8	Stella	SAFE	SAFE	SAFE	SAFE	OUT			
9	Jonas	SAFE	SAFE	SAFE	OUT				
10	Sarah	SAFE	LOW	OUT					
11-12	Nicolas	SAFE	OUT						
11-12	Tenzing	SAFE	OUT						

The contestant was in danger of elimination
The contestant was eliminated
The contestant was eliminated outside of the judging panel
The contestant won the competition

=== Photo shoots ===
- Episode 1 photo shoot: Promo shoot (semifinals)
- Episode 2 photo shoot: Swimwear with Splashing Water
- Episode 3 photo shoot: Sedcard
- Episode 4 photo shoots: At the Racetrack and Hanging from a Ladder
- Episode 5 photo shoot: 20 Minuten Friday Magazine Cover
