= Zoë Pastelle =

Swiss actress and social media influencer

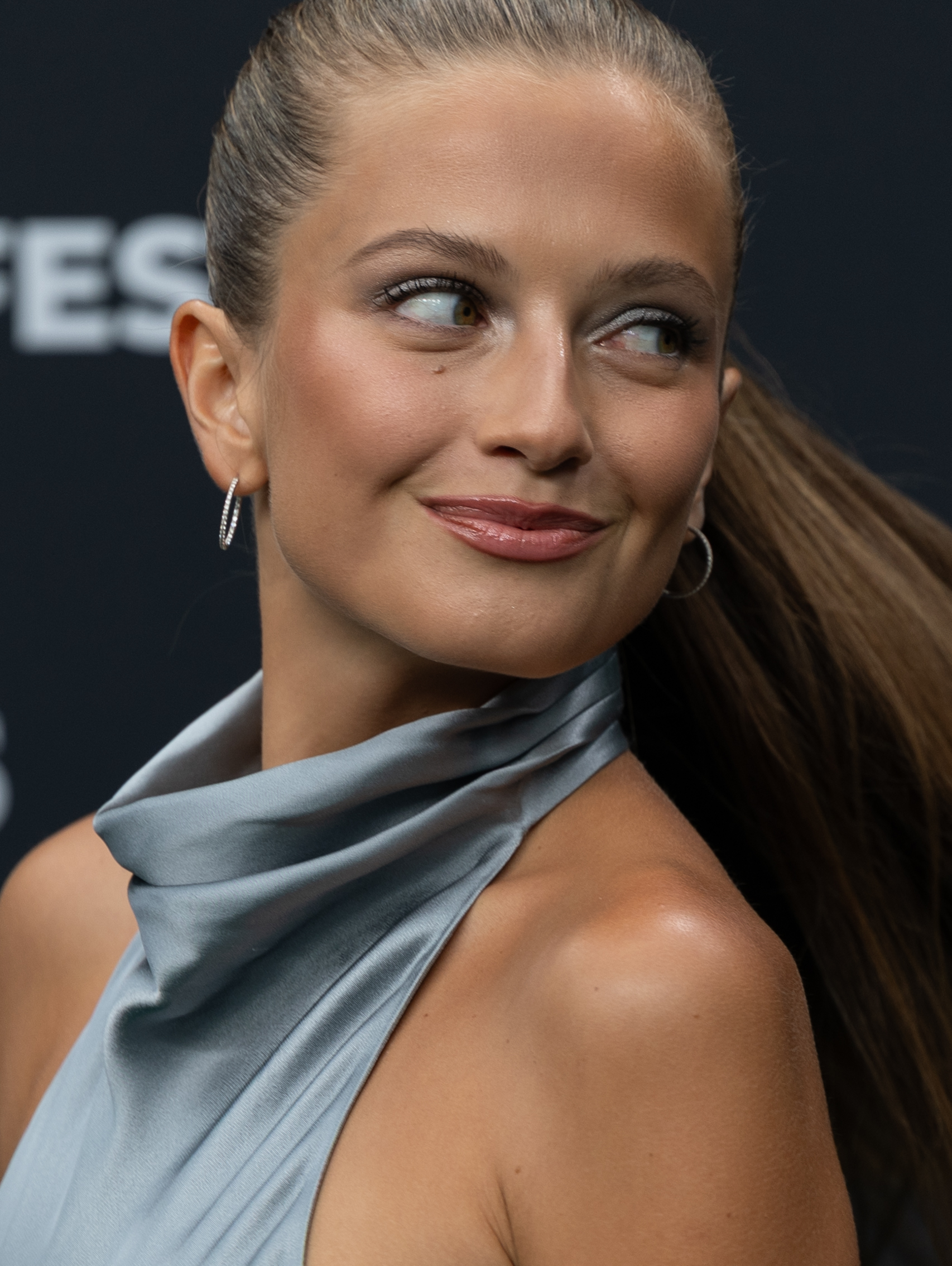
- Pastelle in 2025
- Born: Zoë Pastelle Holthuizen; 5 April 1999 (age 27); Zürich, Switzerland
- Education: European Film Actor School
- Occupations: Actress, model, social media influencer
- Years active: 2015–present
- Children: 1
- Relatives: Václav Klaus (granduncle)

Zoë Pastelle Holthuizen (born 5 April 1999) known professionally as Zoë Pastelle is a Swiss actress, model, and social media influencer. Holthuizen was nominated for a Swiss Film Award in 2018 for her role as Gianna in the coming-of-age film Blue My Mind. She had a supporting role, as Amalindis, in the Swiss television feature film Die Hexenprinzessin in 2020.

== Early life and education ==
Holthuizen was born 5 April 1999, the younger of two children, to Martina Holthuizen (née Jaroch) and Mark Holthuizen, a business executive. She is of Czech and Dutch origin. She has an older brother, Kai Timothy Holthuizen, who is a model and musician. She is the grandniece of Václav Klaus, who served as president of the Czech Republic.

Holthuizen trained in ballet, hip hop, jazz, and folk dance. She became familiar with social media when she was started creating online content for the dance academy she was enrolled in. She attended the European Film Actor School from 2014 to 2017.

== Career ==
Holthuizen began her career as a stage actress, performing in plays at the European Film Actor School including Die Möve, Die drei Schwestern, Blick zurück im Zorn, and Late Night Talk. She is signed as a fashion model with Visage International Management. Holthuizen dropped her last name, and goes by her first and middle names professionally, due to her last name being "difficult to pronounce".

In 2015 she received an Audience Award at the Zürich Film Festival for her role in the short film Mein erstes Mal | Nicht mein letztes Mal, which she also directed. Her major film debut was as Alina in the 2015 Swiss drama film Amateur Teens. In 2017 Holthuizen had a lead supporting role as Gianna in Lisa Brühlmannthe's coming-of-age film Blue My Mind. In 2018 she had a guest role in the British dark-comedy-drama television series Killing Eve.

In 2018 she was nominated for Best Performance in a Supporting Role at the Swiss Film Awards and for the Best Actor Newcomer Award at the Braunschweig International Film Festival for her role as Gianna in Blue My Mind. She attended the Cannes Film Festival in 2019.

In 2020 Holthuizen had a supporting lead role as Amalindis in the Swiss television feature film Die Hexenprinzessin. The film was released as part of ZDF's series Märchenperlen.

Holthuizen was a judge on the second season of the reality television series Switzerland's Next Topmodel in 2019.

With over 200,000 followers on Instagram, she is one of the most successful social media influencers in Switzerland. She has spoken about the challenges of being in the influencing business in Schweizer Illustrierte's Future of Influencers series.

== Personal life ==
Holthuizen speaks German, French, Czech, and English. She is vegan. During the COVID-19 pandemic in Switzerland, Holthuizen spoke out against proposals for a vaccine mandate, stating that she would "retire to a desert island" if a "vaccination certificate was introduced." In early March 2024, Holthuizen became a mother.

== Filmography ==
- Mein erstes Mal | Nicht mein letztes Mal (2014)
- Amateur Teens (2015)
- Blue My Mind (2017)
- Killing Eve (2018)
- Switzerland's Next Topmodel (2019)
- Die Hexenprinzessin (2019-2020)
