= Switzerland's Next Topmodel season 1 =

Switzerland's Next Topmodel
- Season 1
- Judges: Manuela Frey; Papis Loveday; Dandy Diary
- No. of contestants: 13
- Winner: Saviour Chibueze Anosike
- No. of episodes: 7

Release
- Original network: ProSieben Schweiz
- Original release: 19 October – 30 November 2018

Season chronology
- Next → Season 2

Switzerland's Next Topmodel season 1 is the first season of Switzerland's Next Topmodel (often abbreviated to SNTM). It aired on ProSieben Schweiz from October to November 2018. For the first season, the show introduced a division of also male models have a change of winning the competition. The show was hosted by Topmodel Manuela Frey. The international destination was Milan.

== Contestants ==
(ages stated are at start of contest)

Team	Contestant	Age	Height	Hometown	Finish	Place
Papis	Jérômie Repond	18	1.70 m (5 ft 7 in)	Basel	Episode 2	13–11
Dandy Diary	Livio Achermann DaSilva	22	1.84 m (6 ft 1/2 in)	Solothurn	Episode 2	13–11
Papis	Mauritius Loosli	22	1.83 m (6 ft 0 in)	Basel	Episode 2	13–11
Dandy Diary	Anna Schlüssel	23	1.72 m (5 ft 7 1/2 in)	Zürich	Episode 3	10–9
Papis	Elizabeta Ljubić	23	1.71 m (5 ft 7 1/2 in)	Zürich	Episode 3	10–9
Papis	Elena Egli	20	1.70 m (5 ft 7 in)	Zürich	Episode 4	8–6
Papis	Valon Berisha	21	1.81 m (5 ft 11 1/2 in)	Biel	Episode 4	8–6
Dandy Diary	Vivienne Oesch	17	1.77 m (5 ft 9 1/2 in)	Zürich	Episode 4	8–6
Papis	Lorenzo Boscardin	21	1.75 m (5 ft 9 in)	Berlin, Germany	Episode 6	5
Dandy Diary	Vanessa Gosteli	22	1.70 m (5 ft 7 in)	Bern	Episode 6	4
Dandy Diary	Sandro Yves Wederv	26	1.82 m (5 ft 11 1/2 in)	Luzern	Episode 6	3
Papis	Marion Reber	23	1.76 m (5 ft 9 1/2 in)	Aargau	Episode 6	2
Dandy Diary	Saviour Chibueze Anosike	18	1.88 m (6 ft 2 in)	Biel	Episode 6	1

== Episode summaries ==
=== Episode 1 ===
Original airdate: 19 October 2018

The first episode of Switzerland's Next Topmodel was the casting episode.

From over 1,500 applicants, 24 boys and girls were selected to enter the semifinals. They are welcomed into the competition from Swiss Topmodel, Manuela Frey, Model and Runway Coach, Papis Loveday and Fashion-Duo Dandy Diary. For their first challenge, the contestants had to walk on the runway wearing their best swimwear look. At the end of the runway they also have few seconds to get photographed and impress the judges. After the first runway walk, contestant Jérômie gets called back on stage and is asked to get already a Makeover. She hesitates but in the end she accepts the makeover. After the challenge, six contestants are eliminated, leaving eighteen to compete for the twelve places in the finals. After the first elimination, the contestants are told to get ready to walk again on the runway wearing Haute Couture looks. At the end for the runway, the team leaders (Papis Loveday and Dandy Diary) are asked to buzz for the boys and the girls they want to work with during the competition, if both teams buzz, it's up to the contestant to pick in which team he wants to go.

Team Papis: M. L., J. R., E. E., L. B., V. B. & E. L..

Team Dandy Diary: S. A., V. G., S. W., L. A., A. S. & V. O..

Marion is the last one to walk the runway, she gets picked by both teams and she chooses Team Papis. Unfortunately being the teams already full, her permanency on the competition is questioned. In the end, Manuela claims that she also deserves a spot on the final cast, making Marion the thirteenth contestant in the running towards becoming Switzerland's next Topmodel. Furthermore, Sandro and Elena get picked for a fashion editorial due to a secret casting, making them the first contestants to book a job.

- Booked for job: Elena Egli & Sandro Yves Weder
- Featured photographer: Ellin Anderegg

=== Episode 2 ===
Original airdate: 26 October 2018

The week starts with a message from Manuela alluding to the fact that makeovers would be taking place soon. As Sandro and Elena shoot their editorial, the rest of the contestants receive makeovers. Most of the contestants are satisfied with the results, although Jérômie doesn't feel confident with the new hairstyle. Later at the hair salon, Elena is also receiving her makeover and is completely unsatisfied with her short cut.

This week the boys and girls are facing their very first official photoshoot in the Swiss Alps, they have to pose on the snow in pairs wearing high fashion looks. Moreover, they have special guests on set: eagles, hawks and owls. These animals have to be included in the shoot. Pairs are: Sandro & Elizabeta; Valon & Vivienne; Anna & Mauri; Elena & Saviour; Lorenzo & Vanessa; Jérômie & Livio. Marion being the thirteenth contestant also chooses Saviour to pose with her. During the shoot some of the contestants like Saviour, Elena, Lorenzo and Vanessa deliver good performances while others like Elizabeta, Valon, Jérômie and Livio fail to impress Manuela. Next day, Elena has still difficulties in accepting her new hairstyle and gets comforted by team leader Papis Loveday.

Later that day, the contestants are surprised by runway coach and dancer Nikeata Thompson, who tests their walks on the runway. After the training, the models are told to get ready because it's elimination time. They have to walk in pairs on an icy runway. Elena, Jérômie, Livio and Mauri are the bottom four and only one of them will move forward to the next round. Jérômie is out due to her weak performance on set and on the runway, Livio is also out because of his lackluster performance.

In the end it's Elena to receive her photo while Mauri gets eliminated.

- Featured photographer: Johannes Diboky
- Special guest: Nikeata Thompson
- Bottom four: Elena Egli; Jérômie Respond; Livio Achermann DaSilva & M. Loosli
- Eliminated: Jérômie Respond; Livio Achermann DaSilva & M. Loosli

=== Episode 3 ===
Original airdate: 2 November 2018

The third week of the competition starts with a shooting, the Sedcard. The models have to present their most authentic side. Present during the shooting is also Janina Sarajlic, representing Time Model Agency, the agency who will offer a contract to the winner of the show. Most of the contestants deliver good pictures with the exception of Anna, Elizabeta and Valon, who are critiqued by their coaches. Moving on that day, the models are sent to a casting for shoe label “Dosenbach”, they will work in pairs and the theme of the casting is New Year's Eve in perfect James Bond style, the contestants need to show not only their skills as models but also as actors. Also the winners of the casting will receive immunity from elimination. Pairs are: Sandro & Elena; Valon & Vanessa; Marion & Saviour; Anna & Elizabeta; Lorenzo & Vivienne. Sandro and Elena are first up, they deliver a good performance, especially Sandro. Backstage, contestant Lorenzo has issues with his outfit and shoes and in the end he decides to enter the casting wearing high hells. Vivienne and him miss the acting part but still convince with their photos. Valon and Vanessa look elegant but don't convince the clients. Marion and Saviour are praised for their acting and chemistry. Anna and Elizabeta don't impress the clients. In the end, Sandro and Marion win the casting and are automatically safe from elimination. Back in the modelvilla, Saviour is upset not getting the job and gets comforted by fellow contestant Marion. The models also have to vote for the best sedcard, Vivienne gets the majority of votes and wins a price including some jewelry from Thomas Sabo.

Next day is for the models shooting time, they have to shoot wearing extremely sexy outfits from designer Lorand Lajos, having only eight minutes to get the perfect shot. The models are posing in a church inspired setting, in contrast to their looks. As the designer tells Valon that he would only be wearing high heels red boots and sparkling undergarments, he refuses to do the shooting and, if he has no choice, states to leave the competition. After a moment of suspense, Valon is given another, less provocative outfit while his original outfit is given to Saviour, also unsatisfied. During the shooting most of the contestants have troubles, some of them like Elizabeta don't feel comfortable because of a religious background. Lorenzo impresses Manuela and the photographer the most. Also Vanessa, Sandro, Marion, Saviour and Valon deliver good shoots. Vivienne and Elena are told to give more, while Anna still doesn't impress.

A new day comes and it's time for one or more models to leave the completion. While Marion and Sandro are shooting a campaign for Dosenbach with fashion photographer, Kristian Schuller, the rest of the models wait for evaluations. First, Manuela asks the models who has the least potential among all contestants. The majority of the contestants name Anna as the weakest model. Team Papis is up first for evaluation, Elena and Lorenzo receive a photo meaning they're moving to the next round. Valon is praised for his shooting but critiqued for his choice to refuse wearing the preselected outfit. Elizabeta is told to have everything it takes to be successful, but it doesn't show in both runway and photos. Both have to wait. Team Dandy Diary is next, Vanessa is told to have a full package and moves to the next round as well as Vivienne, even if she is asked to give more. Saviour and Anna, who is told by Manuela not to be powerful enough, have to wait.

Only two of the bottom four will survive the elimination. Anna is eliminated while Valon receives a photo. Between Saviour and Elizabeta is Saviour to receive the last photo, leaving Elizabeta as the fifth eliminated of the season.

- Booked for job/Immune: Marion Reber & Sandro Yves Weder
- Featured photographers: Karine & Oliver; Mato Johannik; Kristan Schuller
- Special guests: Janina Sarajlic; Lorand Lajos
- Bottom four: Anna Schlüssel, Elizabeta Ljubić, Saviour Anosike & Valon Berisha
- Eliminated: Anna Schlüssel & Elizabeta Ljubić

=== Episode 4 ===
Original airdate: 9 November 2018

The fourth week starts with a challenging photoshoot, hanging upside down. Sandro is first up, he struggles at the beginning but manages to take a good picture in the end. Vivienne is next, she is afraid of heights and doesn't convince Manuela with her facial expressions. Saviour and Marion deliver good performances while Elena struggles during the shoot. Lorenzo convinces again Manuela while Valon constantly gives the same kind of expression and doesn't impress both Manuela and the photographer. Vanessa is the last one to be shooter, she starts very strong but loses the vibe in the end.

Back in the modelvilla, the contestants receive a surprise from team leaders Papis and Dandy Diary, who organized a dinner for the remaining eight. This moment gives the possibility to the contestants to get to know better their coaches and vice versa. At the end of the dinner the coaches leave, letting the boys and girls going on with the party. Early in the morning the next day, the contestants get ready for a training with fitness expert Dave Dollé. The training doesn't feel hard for the remaining models except for Lorenzo, who struggles following the rhythm. Later that day, the contestants are participating in a social media challenge. They have to shoot different pictures and telling a story. Then Influencer Michèle Krüger will evaluate the results. Team Papis is more about story telling while team Dandy Diary focuses on presenting the products and in the end they are the winners of the challenge. The prize is a weekend in Paris for one of their models: Vanessa is the winner of the prize. Next step is the big casting of the season, Nivea is looking for a man or a woman to represent their face or hair products. The contestants have sixty seconds in front of a mirror to style themselves and then only one shot to portray the perfect Nivea type. Valon, Vivienne and Marion receive the best feedbacks from the clients but in the end it's Marion who wins the big campaign.

Next is elimination day, the contestants on their way to their final evaluations receive messages of support from their team leaders. Arriving at the Bruno Weber Skulpture Park, the models are told that after the evaluations some of them are going home while the rest is leaving for fashion capital Milan. Team Dandy Diary: Vivienne is criticized for being the top favorite for the Nivea campaign but still not getting the job; Saviour is complimented on his determination but is also told not to have one single job until now; Vanessa is praised on her shooting but also criticized for not having jobs; Sandro, having two jobs and never letting the judges down can directly pack his bags and go to Milan. Vivienne is asked to wait while Saviour is moving forward. Vanessa is also in the bottom. Team Papis is up: Marion is praised for her shooting and for being the winner of the job but is also told to work on her runway walk; Elena is told by Manuela to be exactly the same as few weeks ago, without getting better or worse; Lorenzo is questioned on his physical condition but got praised for both his shooting and runway walk; Valon is said to have the same face in every single shoot, lacking versatility. Marion is the first one who can pack her belongings and go to Milan while Valon is in the bottom. Lorenzo is also going to Milan and Elena has still to wait. The bottom four is again facing the judges but Manuela one has one picture left. Vivienne is the first one to be eliminated. Valon is also out. Between Elena and Vanessa is Vanessa who gets a picture and joins the top five while Elena gets sent home.

- Booked for job: Marion Reber
- Featured photographers: Raphael Hadad; Thomas Buchwalder
- Special guests: Dave Dollé; Michèle Krüsi; Armin Schams; Nadine Lienhard
- Bottom four: Elena Egli, Valon Berisha, Vanessa Gosteli & Vivienne Oesch
- Eliminated: Elena Egli, Valon Berisha & Vivienne Oesch

=== Episode 5 ===
Original airdate: 16 November 2018

After a hard elimination, the five remaining boys and girls pack their belongings and leave for fashion capital Milan. Manuela welcomes the guys in front of the Milan Cathedral. She tells the models that it's time to give everything without any supports from their team leaders. Right after the models are sent to different castings: the boys are attending a casting for Bia Tambelli while the girls for Luisa Via Roma. During the Luisa Via Roma casting, Marion forgets to bring her portfolio, upsetting the client. Vanessa, on the other hand, looks fresh and spontaneous and wants to be seen again by the client. At the same time the three remaining boys find out that the casting is about fashion jewelry. Saviour struggles to portray a sweet expression while Lorenzo is immediately liked by the client for his soft look. Sandro is also liked for his look but the photographer has issues because of his tattoos, saying the jewels wouldn't be represented at their best. In the end, Lorenzo gets his first job.

The models later that afternoon move to their new accommodation, as they enter their rooms they found out that there is one place less and this cause tension between all contestants. Later, Vanessa finds out that she got the job for Luisa Via Roma and that she will be shooting the morning after. While Vanessa is shooting, the rest of the models meet Manuela who introduce them to a social media challenge, who takes the best selfie with her showing Milan will win a prize. The best selfie is taken by Saviour, who wins some designer pieces from Atelier About. The contestants also find out that they are going to a have a new casting in the afternoon. The casting is for Blogging Tales Magazin, they are looking for a boy and a girl to shoot a fashion editorial there in Milan. Saviour is well received and so is Lorenzo, who presents himself with high hells. Vanessa is found to be unprofessional not having the right outfit for the casting. In the end, Saviour and Lorenzo are the two chosen for the editorial.

Back in the hotel the boys and girls discuss their feelings about not feeling like a group anymore and they decide to leave the tension behind, enjoying the last week before finale. Later they meet Manuela and they receive love messages from their families and friends. The next day, Lorenzo and Saviour shoot the editorial with Lorenzo dress up like a girl. The client claims to be very satisfied with the result. After that, it's time for the models to get ready to walk the runway again before elimination. At the end of the walk, Manuela asks the team leaders who they feel should not move on to the finals. Papis claims he would move on without Lorenzo and Dandy Diary name Sandro because the others in their team are stronger. In the end, Manuela announces that nobody will go home that week as they all proved to have what it takes to become the next topmodel. Lorenzo, Marion, Sandro, Saviour and Vanessa are all finalists.

- Booked for job: Lorenzo Boscardin; Saviour Anosike; Vanessa Gosteli
- Special Guests: Andrea Panconesi; Bia Tambelli; Grace Maier
- Eliminated: None

=== Episode 6 ===
Original airdate: 23 November 2018

- Final five: Lorenzo Boscardin, Marion Reber, Sandro Yves Wederv, Saviour Chibueze Anosike & Vanessa Gosteli
- Bottom two: Lorenzo Boscardin & Marion Reber
- Eliminated: Lorenzo Boscardin
- Final four: Marion Reber, Sandro Yves Wederv, Saviour Chibueze Anosike & Vanessa Gosteli
- Eliminated: Vanessa Gosteli & Sandro Yves Wederv
- Final two: Marion Reber & Saviour Chibueze Anosike
- Switzerland's Next Topmodel: Saviour Chibueze Anosike

== Summaries ==
=== Results table ===
Place	Model	Episodes							
Place	Model	1 (Note: Episode 1 was the casting episode where 24 semi finalist were narrowed down to the top 13.)	2	3	4	5	6		
1	Saviour	SAFE	SAFE	LOW	SAFE	SAFE	SAFE	SAFE	WINNER
2	Marion	SAFE	SAFE	IMM	SAFE	SAFE	LOW	SAFE	OUT
3	Sandro	SAFE	SAFE	IMM	SAFE	SAFE	SAFE	OUT	
4	Vanessa	SAFE	SAFE	SAFE	LOW	SAFE	SAFE	OUT	
5	Lorenzo	SAFE	SAFE	SAFE	SAFE	SAFE	OUT		
6-8	Elena	SAFE	LOW	SAFE	OUT				
6-8	Valon	SAFE	SAFE	LOW	OUT				
6-8	Vivienne	SAFE	SAFE	SAFE	OUT				
9-10	Anna	SAFE	SAFE	OUT					
9-10	Elizabeta	SAFE	SAFE	OUT					
11-13	Jérômie	SAFE	OUT						
11-13	Livio	SAFE	OUT						
11-13	Mauritius	SAFE	OUT						

The contestant was immune from elimination
The contestant was in danger of elimination
The contestant was eliminated
The contestant won the competition

=== Photo shoot guide ===
- Episode 2 photo shoot: Winter fashion in couples
- Episode 3 photo shoot: Alternative fashion in a church; Sedcard
- Episode 4 photo shoot: Hanging upside down
- Episode 6 photo shoot: Friday Magazine Covers
