= Supermodel season 2 =

Supermodel
- Season 2
- Promotial photograph of the cast of season 2 of Supermodel
- No. of episodes: 8

Release
- Original network: 3+ TV
- Original release: 30 September – 11 November 2008

Season chronology
- ← Previous; Season 1

Supermodel, Season 2 is the second season of the Swiss reality show on 3+ TV, a competition of non-professional aspiring models for a contract with Swiss Model Agency Option, a cover on Swiss Magazin SI Style and a Renault Twingo.

German model Franziska Knuppe, who was a guest judge on Season 1 replaced Nadja Schildknecht as host, Yannick Aellen and Mike Karg remain as the two other permanent judges. Bruce Darnell, known in Switzerland for his role on the first two seasons of Germany's Next Top Model, coaches the 15 chosen finalists on the runway in his typical "dramatic" style.

== Episodes ==
=== Episode 1: Das grosse Casting ===
Original airdate: September 30, 2008

- Title Translation: The Big Casting
- Challenge winner: Andrea F.
- Bottom two: Angela & Anja Reolon
- Eliminated: Anja Reolon
- Eliminated: Lauren & Imogen Macpherson
- Featured photographer: Siro Antonio Micheroli
- Guest judge: Sabine Diethelm

=== Episode 2: Die erste Auslandsreise ===
Original Airdate: October 7, 2008

- Title Translation: The first trip abroad
- Challenge winner: None
- Eliminated: Sara & Angela
- Featured photographer: Andrea Diglas
- Guest judge: Bruce Darnell

=== Episode 3: Sonne, Sand und Meer ===
Original Airdate: October 14, 2008

- Title Translation: Sun, Beach and the Sea
- Challenge winners: Jesica Martinez & Tiffany Kappeler
- Eliminated outside of judging panel: Andrea B. & Henriette
- Bottom two: Janine Rohner & Maja Hatibovic
- Eliminated: None
- Featured photographer: Klaus Behnisch
- Guestjudge: Barbara Eberle

=== Episode 4: Modemetropole Paris ===
Original airdate: October 21, 2008

- Title Translation: Fashion Metropolis Paris
- Challenge winner: None
- Eliminated: Janine Rohner
- Featured photographer: Frederic Auerbach
- Guest judge: Melanie Wininger

=== Episode 5: Jetzt wird's gefährlich ===
Original airdate: October 28, 2008

- Title Translation: It's getting dangerous
- Challenge winner: Andrea F. & Bianca Bauer
- Eliminated: Stefanie Thommen & Maja Hatibovic
- Featured photographer: Philipp Jeker
- Guest judge: Simone Bargetze

=== Episode 6: Sayonara Supermodels ===
Original airdate: November 4, 2008

- Title translation: Goodbye supermodels
- Challenge winner: All
- Eliminated: Tiffany Kappeler
- Bottom two: Andrea F. & Radha Binder
- Eliminated: Andrea F.
- Featured director: Kuti

=== Episode 7: Finale ===
Original airdate: November 11, 2008

- Title Translation: Final
- Final three: Bianca Bauer, Jesica Martinez & Radha Binder
- Eliminated: Jesica Martinez
- Final two: Bianca Bauer & Radha Binder
- Supermodel: Bianca Bauer
- Featured photographer: Hajime Watanabe & Mark Liddell
- Guest judges: Bruce Darnell & Sabine Diethelm

== Contestants ==
(ages stated are at start of contest)

Contestant	Age	Height	Hometown	Finish	Place
Lauren	25	1.75 m (5 ft 9 in)	Zürich	Episode 1	15-13
Imogen Macpherson	16	1.74 m (5 ft 8 1/2 in)	Bern	Episode 1	15-13
Anja Reolon	20	1.79 m (5 ft 10 1/2 in)	Luterbach	Episode 1	15-13
Sara Keller	20	1.72 m (5 ft 7 1/2 in)	Zürich	Episode 2	12
Angela Melo Ramirez	22	1.71 m (5 ft 7 1/2 in)	Worb	Episode 2	11
Andrea Bolzli	18	1.69 m (5 ft 6 1/2 in)	Burgdorf	Episode 3	10
Henriette	17	1.77 m (5 ft 9 1/2 in)	Zürich	Episode 3	9
Janine Rohner	17	1.68 m (5 ft 6 in)	Rebstein	Episode 4	8
Stefanie Thommen	17	1.75 m (5 ft 9 in)	Zeiningen	Episode 5	7
Maja Hatibovic	19	1.86 m (6 ft 1 in)	Frauenfeld	Episode 5	6
Tiffany Kappeler	22	1.70 m (5 ft 7 in)	Appenzell	Episode 6	5
Andrea Franz-Johnson	23	1.71 m (5 ft 7 1/2 in)	Zürich	Episode 6	4
Jesica Veronica Martinez	23	1.83 m (6 ft 0 in)	Benglen	Episode 7	3
Radha Binder	23	1.78 m (5 ft 10 in)	Brione	Episode 7	2
Bianca Bauer	19	1.77 m (5 ft 9 1/2 in)	Dintikon	Episode 7	1

== Summaries ==
=== Call-out order ===
Franziska's call-out order
Order	Episodes							
Order	1		2	3	4	5	6	7
1	Imogen; Radha; Andrea B. Bianca; Andrea F.	Janine	Tiffany	Jesica	Jesica	Andrea F.	Tiffany	Bianca
2	Imogen; Radha; Andrea B. Bianca; Andrea F.	Stefanie	Radha	Stefanie	Bianca	Stefanie	Jesica	Radha
3	Imogen; Radha; Andrea B. Bianca; Andrea F.	Henriette	Sara	Radha	Maja	Tiffany	Bianca	Jesica
4	Imogen; Radha; Andrea B. Bianca; Andrea F.	Bianca	Bianca	Andrea F.	Radha	Radha	Radha	
5	Imogen; Radha; Andrea B. Bianca; Andrea F.	Angela	Henriette	Tiffany	Janine	Bianca	Andrea F.	
6	Tiffany	Anja	Andrea F.	Bianca	Andrea F.	Jesica		
7	Sara	Maja	Andrea B.	Maja	Tiffany	Maja		
8	Anja; Jesica	Radha	Jesica	Janine	Stefanie			
9	Anja; Jesica	Lauren	Janine	Henriette				
10	Janine; Angela; Stefanie	Andrea F.	Maja	Andrea B.				
11	Janine; Angela; Stefanie	Tiffany	Angela					
12	Janine; Angela; Stefanie	Jesica	Stefanie					
13	Henriette; Lauren; Maja	Sara						
14	Henriette; Lauren; Maja	Imogen						
15	Henriette; Lauren; Maja	Andrea B.						

The contestant was eliminated
The contestant was eliminated outside of judging panel
The contestant was part of a non-eliminated bottom two
The contestant won the competition

- In episode 3, Andrea B. and Henriette were eliminated outside of judging panel. At elimination, Janine and Maja were in danger of elimination, but neither of them were eliminated.

=== Photo Shoot Guide ===
- Episode 1 Photo Shoot: “Bergsteigen an den Alpen” (Climbing the Alpes)
- Episode 2 Photo Shoot: “Kuss Shooting” (Kiss Shooting)
- Episode 3 Photo Shoot: “Unterwasser Shooting” (Underwater Shooting)
- Episode 4 Photo Shoot: “Fechtende Rivalinnen aus dem 18. Jahrhundert” (18th Century Fencing Rivals)
- Episode 5 Photo Shoot: “Warten auf Adam” (Waiting for Adam)
- Episode 6 Video Shoot: “Rock Zombie Musen” (Rock Zombie Muses) (video clip for a Japanese rock band)
- Episode 7 Photo Shoot: “Geisha vs. Sumo” / “SI Style Cover Shoot”
