= Supermodel (Swiss TV series) =

- Genre: Reality television
- Created by: 3+ TV Network AG
- Presented by: Nadja Schildknecht (1); Franziska Knuppe (2)
- Judges: Nadja Schildknecht (1); Franziska Knuppe (2); Yannick Aellen; Mike Karg
- Opening theme: 50 Cent feat. Justin Timberlake - "Ayo Technology" (1); Pink - "So What" (2)
- Country of origin: Switzerland
- No. of episodes: 16

Production
- Running time: 72-90 minutes

Original release
- Network: 3+ TV
- Release: 6 November 2007 – 11 November 2008

Supermodel was a Swiss reality television series which aired on 3+ in 2007 and 2008. The series documented a modeling competition, comprising novice models, to find a "Supermodel". The first season of series, which aired from November to December 2007, was presented by former model Nadja Schildknecht, and the second, which aired from September to December 2008, was presented by Franziska Knuppe.

== Show format ==
After an episode featuring the casting process with 100 chosen contestants, the experiences of the finalists with a weekly photo shoot, and several tasks and castings were shown in one episode that ended with the eliminated of two contestants.

Makeovers were administered to contestants early in the season (usually after the first or second elimination in the finals)

== Seasons ==
Season	Premiere date	Winner	Runner(s)-up	Other contestants in order of elimination	Number of contestants	Destination(s)
1	16 November 2007	Nathalie Güdel	Gorana Markovic	Rrezearta (quit) & Jessica (quit), Mirjana Reljic & Alexandra Krone & Milica Djordjevic, Anastasiya Chernichenko & Noemi Rubera, Erika Weibel & Sabine Staubli, Aleksandra Petrovic & Ivana Vujcic, Tanya Krummenacher, Arina Mironkina, Eliane Heutschi	16	Bangkok; Paris; London; New York City
2	30 September 2008	Bianca Bauer	Radha Binder	Anja Reolon & Lauren & Imogen Macpherson, Sara Keller & Angela Melo Ramirez, Henriette & Andrea Bolzli, Janine Rohner, Stefanie Thommen, Maja Hatibovic, Tiffany Kappeler & Andrea Franz-Johnson, Jesica Martinez	15	Milan; London; Malé; Paris; Tokyo
