= Germany's Next Topmodel =

Model contest on television

- Genre: Reality television
- Created by: Tyra Banks
- Presented by: Heidi Klum
- Judges: Heidi Klum; Peyman Amin; Bruce Darnell; Armin Morbach; Boris Entrup; Rolf Scheider; Qualid Ladraa; Kristian Schuller; Thomas Rath; Thomas Hayo; Enrique Badulescu; Wolfgang Joop; Michael Michalsky
- Opening theme: 1 - "Nasty Girl"; 2 - "Hit Me Up"; 3 - "Amazing (Remix)"; 4 - "Circus"; 5 - "Fight for This Love"; 6 - "Girls Beautiful"; 7 - "Turn Me On"; 8 - "Scream & Shout"; 9 - "It Should Be Easy"; 10 - "What I Did for Love"; 11 - "In the Night & Work"; 12 - "24K Magic"; 13 - "The One (I Want to Know)"; 14 - "Melancholic Paradise"; 15 - "Look at Her Now"; 16 - "White Lies"; 17 - "Chai Tea with Heidi"; 18 - "Never Gonna Not Dance Again"; 19 - "Sunglasses at Night"; 20 - "Vogue"; 21 - "Red Eye"
- Country of origin: Germany
- Original language: German
- No. of seasons: 21
- No. of episodes: 350

Production
- Producers: Tresor TV (season 1 to 7); RedSevenEntertainment (season 8 to present)
- Camera setup: Multi-camera
- Running time: approx. 60–100 minutes

Original release
- Network: ProSieben
- Release: 25 January 2006 – present

Germany's Next Topmodel (often abbreviated as GNTM) is a German reality television series based on the concept introduced by Tyra Banks with America's Next Top Model. The competition is hosted by Heidi Klum, who also serves as the lead judge and executive producer of the show.

Spanning a 21-year period, it is the longest-running adaptation of the Top Model franchise and features the second-most seasons aired worldwide. Furthermore, with 350 episodes broadcast by April 2025, it has surpassed America's Next Top Model (which only aired 315 episodes) to become the longest Top Model series in the world by episode count. By the conclusion of its twenty-first season, the series also ties the record for producing twenty-four winners, matching the legacy of the original American series.

== Show format ==
Germany's Next Topmodel currently has 21 seasons. Each seasons has 10 to 25 episodes and starts with 12–54 contestants.

During each episode, one contestant is eliminated, although a double/triple/mass-elimination or no elimination may occur based on the consensus of the judging panel. Makeovers are administered to contestants early in the competition, usually after the first or second elimination in the finals.

=== Differences between ANTM and GNTM ===
While America's Next Top Model typically starts with 30 semi-finalists who are cut down to a batch of between ten and 16 contestants, Germany's Next Top Model cycle premieres begin with highlights from the auditions of 100 candidates (seasons 1 and 2), 120 candidates (season 3), and 184 candidates (season 20) respectively.

The format of the weekly competitions also differs between the two shows. From seasons 11 to 13, the German version introduced a team and battle concept where contestants were divided into competing teams led by judges Thomas Hayo and Michael Michalsky. The twelfth German season also introduced the shoot-out, where two or more of the previous week's worst-performing models face an elimination duel during their next photoshoot. Furthermore, the panel challenge in front of the judges in the US version is almost always replaced by an elimination runway walk in front of the judges on the German adaptation.

In the US, the models go on go-sees only once per season, usually right before or after they travel to another country. In the German version, these castings happen many times throughout the season at random moments. Starting with the fifteenth German season, the show also added go-sees marathons. Since the sixteenth German season, the photoshoot or video shoot segment may be replaced entirely by the makeovers, the go-sees marathon, or interview training. For episodes that merely focus on the go-sees marathon, the models spend the whole time running to multiple castings back-to-back instead of doing the usual shoot.

In the elimination process in the US, host Tyra Banks hands out a photograph to each of the contestants who are safe, in order of merit. The two worst-performing contestants of each episode are called to stand before Banks and are judged individually. This call-out order plays a significant role in determining the best contestant of the week. In contrast, the call-out order in Germany does not provide insights into the quality of the contestants' performance, except during the finals. Moreover, the German contestants are called out one by one while the others wait in a backstage lobby, whereas the US contestants are all present together. The German series also start the finale with between three and six contestants left, while in the US, the finale starts with two or three contestants left.

The composition of the judging panel also changed in the German version. Starting in season 14, there was no longer a permanent panel of judges. Instead, the seats alongside Klum remain open for one or more guest judges each week, a format that remains unchanged for all succeeding seasons. Notably, season 14 is also the only season where guest judges had the opportunity to grant a wildcard for contestants who were in danger of elimination.

Casting rules from the original American format have also been adapted by the German adaptation. Germany removed the maximum age limit by season 17, allowing contestants of all ages to enter the contest, with the lowest age limit remaining at 18. Models who are past 27 years of age are referred to as best-agers within the show.

Travel and finale logistics further highlight the differing production structures. On the American show, the final five or six contestants travel to an international destination. In contrast, the German version does not consistently commit to a specific number of journeys abroad; season 1 went abroad two times, season 2 went four times, and season 3 went to six different countries.

On America's Next Top Model, the final two or three contestants compete on a runway, and the winner is chosen in the judging room. On Germany's Next Top Model, between three and six contestants compete on a runway and a photoshoot in front of a live audience in Cologne, Germany before the winner is revealed. The final show is broadcast live on TV. season 4's finale was the first to air live from a concert hall instead of a TV studio. These live finales lasted until season 20, and by season 21, the show returned to filming a pre-recorded finale due to budget cuts.

Starting with the nineteenth German season, the show expanded its format to include male contestants. Unlike other co-ed Top Model adaptations that still crown a single winner, the German adaptation declares two separate titles each season—one for each gender. While season 19 featured both genders living and shooting together in a single phase, a new format was introduced from season 20 onward: the men and women initially compete in completely separate productions—living in different houses and participating in separate photoshoots, castings, and elimination walks—before eventually merging midway through the season.

=== Spinoffs ===
==== Die Model WG ====
Due to Klum's pregnancy, the start of the fifth season was postponed and began in March. Instead, a spinoff called Die Model WG was shown, featuring several former contestants from the show and hosted by judge Peyman Amin.

==== Germany's Next Topmodel: Stories ====
During the season-long twentieth anniversary celebration of the series, Germany's Next Top Model: Stories is an online-exclusive companion show streaming on Joyn, that aired simultaneously with the season. The show, also presented by Klum, offers behind-the-scenes and never-before-seen footage of the season.

== Host and judges ==
Only Heidi Klum herself has been part of the judging panel on every cycle. All the other permanent judges have always been male. Thomas Hayo remained a permanent judge for the longest (six consecutive cycles), followed by Peyman Amin (four consecutive cycles). After leaving the show, Amin eventually hosted the show's spin-off, Die Model WG, and signed Cycle 5's winner Alisar Ailabouni despite never meeting her on the show. Although Boris Entrup was only a regular judge on Cycle 2, he still was part of the show until 2017 as the makeup advisor. In 2017, Wolfgang Joop became the first former judge to return as he was a guest judge for one episode, a finale, and came back in 2018 as well.

The judging panel since Cycle 14 has consisted of guest judges, with Klum being the only permanent judge.

Judges	Cycles																				
Judges	1 (2006)	2 (2007)	3 (2008)	4 (2009)	5 (2010)	6 (2011)	7 (2012)	8 (2013)	9 (2014)	10 (2015)	11 (2016)	12 (2017)	13 (2018)	14 (2019)	15 (2020)	16 (2021)	17 (2022)	18 (2023)	19 (2024)	20 (2025)	21 (2026)
Hosts
Heidi Klum	Main	Main	Main	Main	Main	Main	Main	Main	Main	Main	Main	Main	Main	Main	Main	Main	Main	Main	Main	Main	Main
Judging Panelists
Peyman Amin	Main	Main	Main	Main																	
Bruce Darnell	Main	Main																		Guest	
Armin Morbach	Main																				Guest
Boris Entrup		Main	Guest																		
Rolf Scheider			Main	Main																	
Qualid "Q" Ladraa					Main																
Kristian Schuller			Guest	Guest	Main		Guest	Guest	Guest	Recurring	Guest	Guest	Guest	Guest	Guest	Guest	Guest	Guest	Guest	Guest	Guest
Thomas Hayo						Main	Main	Main	Main	Main	Main	Main	Main	Guest	Guest	Guest	Guest	Guest	Guest	Guest	Guest
Thomas Rath						Main	Main	Guest													
Enrique Badulescu							Guest	Main	Guest												
Wolfgang Joop									Main	Main		Guest	Guest	Guest	Guest	Guest			Guest		
Michael Michalsky											Main	Main	Main	Guest							

== Series overview ==
Cycle	Premiere date	Winner	Runner-up	Other contestants in order of elimination	Number of contestants	International Destinations
1	25 January 2006	Lena Gercke	Yvonne Schröder	Andrea Lichtenberg & Anne Mühlmeier, Céline Roscheck (quit), Rahel Krüger, Micaela Schäfer, Luise Mikulla, Charlotte Offeney & Lena Meier, Janina Ortmann, Jennifer Wanderer	12	New York; Los Angeles; Paris
2	1 March 2007	Barbara Meier	Anni Wendler	Sophie (quit) & Alina (quit), Janine Mackenroth, Antje Pötke & Enyerlina Sanchez, Janina Cüpper, Alla Kosovan, Denise Dahinten, Aneta Tobor & Tonia Michaely, Milla von Krockow, Anja Platzer, Mandy Graff & Fiona Erdmann, Hana Nitsche	17	St. Moritz; Bangkok; Los Angeles
3	28 February 2008	Jennifer Hof	Janina Schmidt	Rubina Radwanski & Aisha Grone & Sandra Korte, Aline Tausch & Tainá Santos Silva, Elena Rotter, Katharina Harms & Gina-Lisa Lohfink, Bianca Schumacher, Sophia Maus, Vanessa Hegelmaier (quit), Sarah Knappik, Raquel Alvarez, Gisele Oppermann, Wanda Badwal & Carolin Ruppert, Christina Leibold	19	Barcelona; Vienna; New York; Sydney; Melbourne; Los Angeles
4	12 February 2009	Sara Nuru	Mandy Bork	Olivia Bermann & Johanna Popp & Daphne Braun, Tessa Bergmeier, Dana Franke, Tamara Busch & Aline Bauer, Stefanie Theissing, Katrina Scharinger, Larissa Marolt, Ira Meindl, Sarina Nowak, Maria Beckmann & Jessica Motzkus, Marie Nasemann	17	Las Vegas; Los Angeles; Miami; New York; Honolulu; Singapore
5	4 March 2010	Alisar Ailabouni	Hanna Bohnekamp	Aline Kautz (quit), Lena Kaiser & Petra Roscheck, Lara Emsen, Luisa Kreuger, Cathérine Kropp & Nadine Höcherl, Miriam Höller, Wioleta Psiuk, Jacqueline Kohl, Viktoria Lantratova, Pauline Afaja & Leyla Mert, Louisa Mazzurana, Neele Hehemann, Laura Weyel	18	Cape Town; New York; Los Angeles; Beverly Hills; San Francisco; Milan
6	3 March 2011	Jana Beller	Rebecca Mir	Chiara Breder & Lilia Doubrovina, Valerie Blum (quit), Concetta Mazza, Ivon Zito, Christien Fleischhauer, Amira Regaieg, Franziska König, Simone Rohrmüller, Tahnee Keller, Natascha Beil & Paulina Kaluza, Florence Lodevic, Isabel Rath & Sarah Jülich, Joana Damek (quit), Jil Goetz, Marie-Luise Schäfer, Lisa Könnecke, Sihe Jiang, Aleksandra Nagel & Anna-Lena Schubert, Amelie Klever	25	Schladming; London; Los Angeles; Rio de Janeiro; Nassau
7	23 February 2012	Luisa Hartema	Sarah-Anessa Hitzschke	Romina Djurovic & Laura Wittek & Abiba Makoya Bakayoko, Isabell Janku & Sabine Snobl & Franziska Pöhling & Valerie-Charlotte Kirchner von Schröder, Anelia Moor, Michelle-Luise Lafleur & Natalia Kowalczykowska, Maxi Böttcher, Jasmin Abraha, Annabelle Rieß, Melek Civantürk, Shawny Sander, Laura Scharnagl, Inga Bobkow, Lisa Volz, Diana Ovchinnikova (quit), Evelyn Keck (quit), Sara Kulka, Kasia Lenhardt, Dominique Miller	25	Phuket; Los Angeles; Cancún
8	28 February 2013	Lovelyn Enebechi	Maike van Grieken	Clara Zaveta (quit), Katharina Oltzow, Merle Lambert (quit) & Nancy Limonta & Lisa Quack & Linda Niewerth, Lisa-Giulia Wende, Michelle Maas, Höpke Voss (quit) & Bingyang Liu (quit), Leandra Martin, Sophie Jais (quit) & Anna Seebrecht, Jessika Weidner, Janna Wiese, Veronika Weddeling, Jacqueline Thiessen, Leonie Marwitz, Carolin Sünderhauf, Christine Gischler, Marie Czuczman, Anna Maria Damm, Sabrina Elsner, Luise Will	26	Dubai; Los Angeles; New York; Honolulu
9	6 February 2014	Stefanie Giesinger	Jolina Fust	Jill Schmitz & Lisa Seibert, Pauline Cottin (quit) & Laura Haas (quit) & Ina Bartak (quit) & Fata Hasanovic (quit), Franziska Wimmer, Laura Kristen, Emma Kahlert, Antonia Balzer, Simona Hartl & Jana Heinisch, Sainabou Sosseh, Lisa Gelbrich, Sarah Weinfurter, Anna Wilken (quit) & Samantha Brock, Nancy Nagel & Karlin Obiango, Aminata Sanogo & Nathalie Volk & Betty Taube, Ivana Teklic	25	Singapore; Los Angeles; Salt Lake City; New York; Malé
10	12 February 2015	Vanessa Fuchs	Anuthida Ploypetch	Sarah Kocar (quit) & Annabel Paasch (quit), Laura Weidner & Ariana Xhatova, Adriane Sutsch, Jovana Bulic & Lena Stockhausen & Daniela Wolking, Irene Pichler & Neele Busse, Erica Santos Silva, Sandy Provazek & Varisa Caluk, Laura Dünninger & Sara Faste, Kiki Hölzl, Jüli Ürküt & Lisa Bärmann, Darya Strelnikova, Katharina Wandrowsky, Ajsa Selimovic	23	Los Angeles; New York; Paris
11	4 February 2016	Kim Hnizdo	Elena Carriere	Luisa Bolghiran (quit), Fred Riss & Laura-Penelope Baumgärtner (quit) & Saskia Böhlcke, Sophie Schweer & Shirin Kelly, Cindy Unger, Jennifer Daschner & Laura Bräutigam, Christin Götzke & Yusra Babekr-Ali, Lara-Kristin Bayer, Camilla Cavalli, Julia Wulf (quit), Laura-Franziska Blank, Laura Bleicher, Luana Florea, Elena Kilb, Lara Helmer, Taynara Silva Wolf, Jasmin Lekudere, Fata Hasanovic	24	Arrecife; Puerto del Rosario; Madrid; Milan; Los Angeles; New York; Miami; Sydney; Shanghai; Palma
12	9 February 2017	Céline Bethmann	Serlina Hohmann	Christina Wiessner & Saskia Mächler, Elisa Weihmann & Victoria Wanke, Claudia Fiedler, Milena Ziller & Chaline Bang & Kimberly Pereira, Helena Fritz (quit), Aissatou Niang, Deborah Lay, Melina Budde, Neele Bronst, Julia Fux, Greta Faeser (quit), Julia Steyns, Soraya Eckes, Giuliana Radermacher, Brenda Hübscher, Sabine Fischer, Anh Phuong Dinh Phan, Carina Zavline, Lynn Petertonkoker & Maja Manczak, Leticia Wala-Ntuba, Romina Brennecke	28	Barcelona; Menorca; Mallorca; Los Angeles; Las Vegas
13	8 February 2018	Toni Dreher-Adenuga	Julianna Townsend	Selma Toroy, Ivana Rajić-Hrnjić (quit) & Viktoria Wendell & Lania Barzanji, Liane Polt, Julia Freimuth, Lis Kanzler & Valèrie Wersche, Karoline Seul, Isabella Özdemir & Franziska Schwager, Sarah Amiri, Gerda Sadzeviciute, Anne Volkmann, Stephanie Groll, Shari Streich, Abigail Odoom, Bruna Rodrigues & Victoria Pavlas, Zoe Saip, Trixi Giese, Sara Leutenegger & Klaudia Giez, Sally Haas, Jennifer Michalczyk, Christina Peno, Pia Riegel	29	Las Terrenas; Los Angeles; San Diego; New York
14	7 February 2019	Simone Kowalski	Sayana Ranjan	Anastasiya Baskakova & Marlene Donner & Ann-Kathrin Grünewald & Debora do Nascimento Goulart, Olivia Rhode (quit), Maria Willhauk & Naomi Ufelle & Celine Hamann & Loriane Glocke, Kim Dammer (quit), Joelle Pascai-Quednau & Melina Lucht & Catharina Maranca, Leonela Hires, Luna Dzek Dukadjinac, Enisa Bukvic (quit), Jasmin Veit Cadete Rosado (disqualified), Melissa Hemberger, Justine Klippenstein, Theresia Fischer, Julia Helm, Lena Lischewski, Tatjana Wiedemann, Sarah Almoril, Caroline Krüger, Alicija Köhler, Vanessa Stanat (quit), Cäcilia Zimmer	30	Sölden; Los Angeles; New York; Miami
15	30 January 2020	Jacky Wruck	Sarah Posch	Daria Cupachin & Nina-Sue Wurm & Charlotte Steinborn, Saskia Mächler & Malin Blumenthal, Alina Enders & Valeria Zock & Laura Schäfer, Cassandra Feliciano & Marie Rathay, Pinar Aygün & Sarah Sonko, Lucy Hellenbrecht, Mareike Lerch (quit), Julia Figueroa, Johanna Höpfler, Bianca Eigenfeld, Julia Przybylski, Nadine Wimmer, Vivian Cole, Maribel Sancia Todt, Larissa Neumann, Tamara Hitz, Anastasia Borisova, Lijana Kaggwa (quit), Maureen Ugodi	28	Los Pargos; Los Angeles; Montego Bay; Ocho Rios
16	4 February 2021	Alex-Mariah Peter	Dascha Carriero	Franziska Bergander & Maria-Sophie Damasio & Vanessa Gros & Alexandra Reinke & Samantha Herbst & Lena Schreiber, Ricarda Häschke (quit), Maria Schimanski, Sara Ullmann (quit), Nana Fofana, Mira Folster (quit), Sarah Ahrend, Amina Hotait, Miriam Rautert, Chanel Silberberg, Jasmine Jüttner (quit), Alysha Hübner, Linda Braunberger, Mareike Müller, Romy Wolf (quit), Larissa Onac, Elisa Schattenberg, Ana Martinovic, Luca Vanak, Liliana Maxwell, Yasmin Boulaghmal, Ashley Amegan (quit), Romina Palm, Soulin Omar	31	None
17	3 February 2022	Lou-Anne Gleissenebner	Luca Lorenz	Emilie Clement & Meline Kermut & Pauline Schäfer, Kim Bieder & Wiebke Schwartau, Kristina Ber & Lisa-Marie Cordt, Lenara Klawitter (quit), Kashmira Maduwege, Laura Wende, Barbara Radtke & Jasmin Jägers, Julia Weinhäupl & Laura Bittner, Jessica Adwubi & Paulina Stępowska, Annalotta Bönninger, Viola Schierenbeck & Inka Ferbert, Amaya Baker, Vanessa Kunz, Sophie Dräger & Juliana Stürmer, Lena Krüger, Vivien Sterk, Lieselotte Reznicek, Anita Schaller, Noëlla Mbunga, Martina Gleissenebner-Teskey	31	Athens; Mykonos; Los Angeles; Ibiza
18	16 February 2023	Vivien Blotzki	Somajia Ali	Alina Enns & Elisabeth Schmidt & Indira Mölle & Ana Feddersen, Slata Schneider & Melissa Stöbke Carbonel, Melina Rath & Juliette Schulz, Emilia Steitz & Eliz Steingraf & Zoey Saflekou, Sarah Benkhoff (quit), Tracy Baumgarten (quit), Jülide Beganovic, Elsa Latifaj, Lara Rollhaus, Zuzel Palacio Calunga & Charlene Christian, Leona Kastrati, Ina Aufenberg, Anya Elsner, Cassy Cassau & Marielena Aponte, Maike Nitsch, Nina Kablitz, Mirella Janev, Katherine Markov, Ida Kulis & Anna-Maria Fuhrmann, Coco Clever, Nicole Reitbauer, Selma Schröder, Olivia Hounkpati	35	Los Angeles; Las Vegas; Ibiza
19	15 February 2024	Lea Oude Engberink & Jermaine Kokoú Kothé	Xenia Tsilikova & Linus Weber	Vivien Walkemeyer (quit), Pitzi Müller (disqualified), Yanik Schulze & Bảo-Huy Nguyễn & Tracy Baumgarten & Vanessa Horst, Marcia Edhere & Lilian Assih & Felice Wolfgram, Franz Vochezer & Livingsten Amalanathan & Leoni Mecklenburg, Alexandra Bode & Max Uhrmacher, Nuri Enoch & Jana Wetzel & Yusupha Jobarteh & Felix Schneider, Dominik Gruber & Lilli Hachgenei, Maximilian Kreiner & Mare Cirko, Lydwine Nitidem & Lucas Schwarze, Dominic Spillner & Stella Sellere, Aldin Zahirović & Sara Zuraw, Marvin De-Graft, Kadidja Becher, Armin Rausch, Grace Zakhour & Frieder Sell, Fabienne Urbach & Luka Cidic & Julian Cidic	40	Santa Cruz; Los Angeles
20	13 February 2025	Moritz Rüdiger & Daniela Djokić	Pierre Lang & Magdalena Milic	Angelina Matic & Marlene Erdmann Sánchez & Leila Charifa Kraus & Marie Schöner & Jessica Lüdi, Konstantin Bell & Enis Spahija & J.J. Stocks, Natali Czesak & Lucia Doric & Valeria Hoffmann & Stella Miljenovic, Felix Flad & Gabriel Moreno von Schinckel & Christian Preinig, Jule Gscheidle, Jonathan Tolno & Felix Schiller & Ryan Wöhrl, Safia Asare (quit), Laura Klingert, Tim Schröder & Mattes Hafermann & Lian Hansen, Alexander Van Hove & Lulu Gömann, Katrin Gömann-Elsner (quit), Annett Bremer & Keanu Bohatsch, Ethan Moore, Faruk Aytaç Keçe & Felix Lintner & Svenja Sievers, Lisa Brandstätter, Samuel Dohmen, Xenia Redelmann & Nawin Nazary, Eva Bloss & Katharina Van de Sandt, Ray Ewulu, Josy Tolno, Kevin Vukelja & Aaliyah Isla, Canel Delice & Eliob Demofike, Zoe Rötzel & Jannik Richter	51	Los Angeles
21	11 February 2026	Aurélie Siewitz & Ibo Ouro-Bodi	Anna Furtner & Godfrey Egbon	Christian Damke & Jonas Welker & Oskar Elia & Gerhard Versen, Juliet & Janet & Angie Riefler & Sophie Shostak & Sina Metschberger, Hyan Silva & Tari Hetzel & Martin Hoffer, Ursula Gigliotti & Cléo de Gracia & Vanessa Mezler, Matthias Hanauska (quit), Denzel Lonkeu Yankam & Vyvian Nellira, Dilara Beyersdorf & Marie Voss & Stella, Cenk Cihan & Benjamin McCornell & Adrian Kadrijaj, Kim Bathke & Alisa Nowak & Lola Stoll, Eileen Kaupp & Felix Wilkens, Lukas Bienn & Jill Deimel, Juna Kleespies & Lara Lemke & Jayden Lack, Bianca Sissing, Carsten Montanha, Safia Asare (quit), Merret Fuxius, Nana Bmh., Boureima Re., Yanneck Wiese & Antonia Warr, Louis Wielki & Julia de Boer, Marlene Krüger, Alexavius Hill, Anika Köpfer & Luis Flügel, Tony Eberhardt & Daphne Arias-Minda	54	Los Angeles
22	2027	TBA	TBA	TBA	TBA	TBA

== Reception ==
=== Legacy ===
The series have received positive coverage from media analysts and cultural commentators, particularly regarding its production value, longevity, and evolving cultural impact. From a commercial standpoint, television critics have praised the show as a highly successful masterclass in reality entertainment production, noting its rare ability to remain highly profitable and central to German pop culture for decades. While initially criticized for promoting homogenous beauty standards, the show's radical shift toward "diversity" in its later seasons—actively casting plus-size, petite, older, and male models—won praise from some media outlets for broadening mainstream definitions of beauty. Furthermore, the format has been credited with providing a prominent prime-time platform for minority and LGBTQ+ voices; the victory of transgender contestant Alex-Mariah Peter in 2021, for example, was widely celebrated as a progressive milestone for representation on German network television. Other media commentators defend the series as an iconic piece of self-aware, "camp" entertainment that functions as a staple ritualistic viewing experience for younger demographics.

=== Controversies ===
The show has faced heavy criticism in Germany due to the treatment of its contestants. The allegations include gaslighting, abuse of power, misrepresentation of contestants and manipulations by the crew as well as body shaming. The show is also accused of being responsible for the cyberbullying and death threats against the contestants due to the show's misrepresentation of them. The show is also in the focus of the Commission for Youth Media Protection and the Federal Ministry of Family Affairs, Senior Citizens, Women and Youth. Former judges have distanced themselves from the show.

==== Public and industry backlash ====
As of 2023, many celebrities, organizations, and former contestants have publicly spoken out against the show such as Beth Ditto, Eva Padberg, Julia Stegner, Carolin Kebekus, Cordula Stratmann, Désirée Nick, Wolfgang Joop, Roger Willemsen, Sara Nuru, Simone Kowalski, Femen and even the German Federal Ministry of Family Affairs, Senior Citizens, Women and Youth. The Berner Zeitung wrote in 2025 that the show's finale was particularly "boring with a lot of stage presence for little content.

The show has faced significant criticism from within the modeling industry for its minimal relevance and focus on shock value. In 2009, German model Julia Stegner said that Germany's Next Topmodel has "little to do with the reality of modeling." That same year, the newspaper Taz reported that up to that point, none of the previous show winners had managed to establish an international modeling career. Louisa von Minckwitz, the managing director of Louisa Models—one of Germany's largest modeling agencies—stated in an interview that the show paints a completely false picture of the entire industry. She specifically criticized the completely absurd "test situations" to which the participants are subjected, as well as the unrealistic behavior of model booker Peyman Amin. In 2012, former judge Rolf Scheider criticized the program, saying "the show has never produced a new Nadja Auermann or Claudia Schiffer" and that contestants who "lack modeling talent" are selected purely for ratings. In April 2022, the head of MGM Models, Marco Sinervo, expressed that the format has nothing to do with models or fashion, but with the abuse of contestants. According to the experience of MGM Models, even contestants who meet standard industry modeling criteria are practically unplaceable after the GNTM episodes air because the casting show's public image is too poor. Instead of modeling, contestants who do successfully manage to use the show as a career springboard often end up becoming social media influencers or C-list reality TV celebrities. Since season 5, the show's ratings have decreased. To improve ratings, showrunners shifted their focus to inciting conflict between contestants.

==== Misconduct and mistreatment of contestants ====
Due to its ratings-driven nature, the program has faced backlash for abusing contestants. The models are treated poorly on set, often not given enough food, having their mobile phones confiscated, and having limited time to use the restroom. Former judge Wolfgang Joop criticized the show, stating he left because of the program's focus on scenes like "contestants collapsing, getting homesick, crying and falling on their heels."

Physical and psychological risks on set have also drawn heavy criticism. In Episode 9 of season 12, the contestants had a photoshoot on a bed with male models wearing lingerie that took place in the streets of Los Angeles, causing a car accident that Klum made light of. In March 2020, season 13 contestant Abigail Odoom revealed that she had a car accident during a challenge that involved a high speed car. She claimed that not only was she not allowed to talk about the car accident, but also that she was not taken care of in a timely and appropriate manner. In May 2022, Kiki Hölzl from season 10 also revealed that she broke her arm during a photo shoot that the production team buried. They also did a photoshoot from 122 meters in the air, leading to season 16 contestant Linda Braunberger's panic attack and subsequent elimination. Six contestants quit within the same season, most of them citing the decline of their mental health.

==== Contestant misrepresentation and manufactured drama ====
In 2019, season 4 contestant Tessa Bergmeier criticized the show and production team, stating they "often put words and phrases in the contestants' mouths that they would never have said." Former contestant Jana Heinisch of season 9 said that disputes are deliberately provoked by the production. While models are technically allowed to refuse assigned tasks for personal reasons—such as phobias or feelings of shame during revealing photoshoots—there is public criticism that doing so carries a structural threat, as it can negatively impact the jury's elimination decisions. Furthermore, up until season 16, the contestants were referred to almost exclusively by production as "girls" (Mädchen). It was not until the 17th season that Heidi Klum began addressing the participants—some of whom were best-agers—as "models." In January 2010, Der Spiegel Online described the contestants as typical examples of a constantly styled, perpetually chattering type of woman manufactured specifically to fit the female clichés of the ProSieben network.

A physical fight in season 14 between contestants Jasmin Cadete and Lena Lischewski led to Cadete's disqualification. Lischewski's lawyer sued ProSieben and the cameramen, calling it "unacceptable that a television station films a minor beaten by another participant and the present camera crew does not intervene." In 2020, season 14 winner Simone Kowalski said that "it is not right that it is perceived as entertainment, how young people put each other down."

Contestant Lijana Kaggwa received death threats after participating in season 15 of Germany's Next Topmodel, leading her to seek police protection. Mareike Fangmann from Stern wrote that "[ProSieben] also has complicity because the broadcaster knows exactly how to cut scenes together in order to identify a clear bitch. Good for the ratings, good for the show." In December 2020, Kaggwa also stated, "The broadcast of GNTM 2020 completely ruined me mentally. I've become a different person." Following her public allegations of manipulation on her YouTube channel, the production company Seven.One Entertainment Group applied for an injunction against Kaggwa. In July 2022, the Hamburg Regional Court granted the injunction, ruling in favor of the network on 3 out of the 5 contested. Season 9 contestant Nathalie Volk agreed with Kaggwa, saying "I have scars on my body because of Heidi."

Former contestant Tamara Hitz of season 15 revealed that the contestants always had an inkling of who would soon be eliminated because leading up to the elimination, that contestant would be filmed more frequently, proving the fake scripted background of the show and the cruel treatment of the entire production with the contestants. In August 2022 Marie Nasemann (contestant from season 4) revealed that she has scoliosis. Back in 2009, during season 4, her scoliosis was discussed at a casting for Samsung. The editors of GNTM tried to make her cry because of her illness and she also reveals: "I found out years later that Samsung would have liked to book me, but from the production side it wasn't allowed". After Vanessa Stanat quit season 14, ProSieben took over her official Instagram account and her personal account shortly after, possibly due to anger from her quitting weeks before the finale.

==== Legal controversies and financial disparities ====
The contestants' contracts are legally and morally dubious, as they often unevenly benefit Klum and her father Günther. Industry experts have explicitly labeled these model contracts as gag contracts that should legally be considered invalid due to immorality. The agreements stipulate that participants must surrender up to 40% of their earned modeling fees to the agency, and the contracts can be unilaterally changed by production at any time without the contestants' consent. The Association of Licensed Modeling Agencies also heavily condemned the documents, calling them a "completely unreasonable disadvantage for the participants."

In 2011, season 5 winner Alisar Ailabouni withdrew from her contract with ONEeins Management (which is managed by Heidi Klum's father Günther), which she received as part of her prize. This was the first time a winner of the show sued her way out of a prize contract. Ailabouni was not invited to season 6's live finale, while several ProSieben-related magazines referred to season 4 winner Sara Nuru as "last year's winner", given she was working as a backstage host. Since then, a number of other contestants have withdrawn from their contracts with ONEeins, including Viktoria Lantratova and Miriam Höller (both season 5), Jana Beller (season 6 winner) who fought her way out exceptionally quickly just two months after winning, Luise Will (season 8) and Aminata Sanogo (season 9). Other contestants had been freeing themselves from the agency with legal assistance as early as 2009, including season 2 contestant Hana Nitsche. To address these continuous contract controversies, the show announced changes prior to the start of the seventh season, ensuring that the top three finalists would receive a fixed basic monthly income spanning two years.

In May 2017 the German radio and television broadcaster Philipp Walulis criticized the show and its practices within his YouTube show "Walulis". His main criticism is that the contestants get gagging contracts and that the show is only concerned about advertising campaigns instead of the contestants, with some former contestants providing testimony. In December 2020, season 14 winner Simone Kowalski met Günther in court, reaching a verdict that her contract with Günther Klum will be terminated and Kowalski will receive her full salary. In February 2023 Der Spiegel covered the notorious gag contracts that contestants sign to compete. According to Jörg Nabert, these are "illegal gag contracts" that bind models to the agency for two years, which is not customary in the modeling industry.

Following these disputes, ONEeins Fab Management was removed as a prize starting in season 16, and succeeding winners were instead contractually bound to the PR agency Seven Artist Management. By January 2026, ONEeins Fab Management had officially shut down.

==== Impact on young audiences and exploitation ====
The show has also faced criticism for the danger it poses to its young impressionable female audience. In May 2015, psychiatrist Manfred Lütz said the program promotes anorexia. Concerns that the format idealizes an unhealthy body image and actively fosters anorexia were raised by critics almost immediately after the very first season began airing in 2006. Germany's Next Topmodel is subject to regular checks by the German Commission for Youth Media Protection.

Süddeutsche Zeitung argued it does not matter who wins the show, because it is only about promotion, the showmanship of Heidi Klum, and promoting a deadly body image. In February 2010, the Frankfurter Allgemeine Zeitung noted that the production marked a "return of sexism" to which young women voluntarily submit. Under the pretext of preparing them for a harsh industry, the protagonists are permanently humiliated, allowing a predominantly female audience to mock the aspiring models when they stumble over their own legs or the German language. A representative mingle-trends public survey published in June 2010 confirmed this worry, revealing that 78% of German respondents viewed Heidi Klum's show as a direct danger to young girls, with parents and older demographics being the most critical.

German influencer Kayla Shyx saw three effects of the show: "Suicidal thoughts, anxiety, and depression." According to a study by the "International Central Institute for Youth and Educational Television" a third of all girls surveyed with eating disorders named GNTM as a trigger for it. German comedian Carolin Kebekus said "Germany's Next Topmodel made many greats: eating disorders, self-loathing, cyberbullying" and "this year they went crazy for diversity because every woman has the right to be humiliated by Heidi Klum." In February 2023, German InTouch wrote: "The willingness to use violence among girls is increasing. They form gangs, bully, hit. Heidi is also partly responsible for the fact that, at least on TV, such behavior should not lead to extra airtime". The article goes on to say: "With Germany's Next Topmodel absolutely wrong values are conveyed. It gives the impression that bullying is a legitimate means of dealing with each other." A psychological study conducted in 2025 by the University of Osnabrück further analyzed these effects on women with and without eating disorders. By tracking viewers over half a season, researchers found negative effects on self-image across both groups. For vulnerable women with existing eating disorders, the show explicitly heightened anxiety, guilt, and shame, and deepened the perceived flaw gap regarding their own body goals, proving GNTM can act as a "mosaic piece" in developing an eating disorder.

In May 2013, during the live finale of season 8, Klum was attacked by two topless Femen activists, Zana Ramadani and Hellen Langhorst, who flashed her. The activists stormed the runway with the slogans "Sadistic Show" and "Heidi Horror Picture Show" written on their bare chests to protest against the show conveying the message that beauty is worth more than education. This public backlash continued in 2014, when a physical protest event of around 200 participants organized outside the Cologne Cathedral to directly demonstrate against the toxic image of women portrayed by the show, while the live finale was being held just a few kilometers away.

In February 2021, season 16 contestants had to walk nude in front of Heidi Klum, which was criticized by the audience and Ministry of Family Affairs, Senior Citizens, Women and Youth. Despite this criticism, In February 2022, the contestants once again had a public nude photoshoot for season 17. In September 2022, the winner of the season 4, Sara Nuru, joined the criticism of the show, confessing she was "not aware of how blatantly young women were treated there." She added: "With the knowledge I have today, I would not take part in Germany's Next Topmodel again." In April 2022, Hendrik Busch from the online magazine Moviepilot described GNTM as manipulative psycho terror.

==== Animal welfare ====
The program has repeatedly drawn heavy criticism from animal rights organizations, particularly PETA Germany, for its regular use of live animals in photoshoots and challenges. Critics argue that forcing wild and domestic animals into high-stress television environments under bright studio lights and loud production noise constitutes a form of exploitation and animal cruelty.

Since season 1, major public backlash occur when a photoshoot requires contestants to pose with live, exotic animals and insects that are placed directly on their skin. In May 2010, the animal rights organization Four Paws heavily criticized an episode where elephants were used in photoshoots and leashed squirrel monkeys were forced down the runway, calling the situations highly stressful and damaging to the animals. In March 2011, the organization slammed production again when a live chimpanzee was dressed in a human suit and put on display, pointing out that the animal was exhibiting a clear psychological "fear grin" due to studio distress rather than enjoyment. Following these broadcasts, PETA filed an official complaint with the responsible veterinary inspection office against the production company and ProSieben, alleging direct violations of the German Animal Welfare Act. The organization emphasized that exotic animals possess highly sensitive nervous systems and that subjecting them to unpredictable handling by panicked contestants under production conditions causes immense psychological and physiological distress. Despite ongoing public petitions and calls from animal welfare advocates to utilize digital visual effects or synthetic alternatives, the production has faced sustained criticism for continuing to feature live animals in subsequent seasons. However, the use of animals was gradually reduced, and none appeared in the seventeenth season. In a February 2024 radio interview, Heidi Klum publicly announced that live animal shoots would be permanently banned from the show moving forward because the practice is no longer contemporary.

==== Heidi Klum's self-centricity and treatment of contestants ====
Heidi Klum herself is criticized for her treatment of the contestants and her self-centeredness. Puls24 considered her behavior gaslighting. In 2009, the magazine Stern accused Klum of primarily using the show's structural setup as a self-serving commercial vehicle to give unearned media exposure to her personal advertising partners, designer friends, and her husband at the time, Seal. Because of her patronizing and condescending handling of the young contestants, the prominent feminist magazine Emma handed Klum the satirical title of "Pascha of the Month" in May 2009. The NDR media magazine Zapp echoed this sentiment in early 2010, accusing Klum of acting as a harsh executioner in her staged show and calling her a highly questionable role model whose only goal was achieving high television ratings rather than nurturing actual talent.

German comedian Cordula Stratmann referred to Klum as "the face and soul of a cold-hearted, disgusting production" and "the trainer in malice and condescension." Charlotte Koep via T-Online referred to the program and Klum as "the ego show of the GNTM deadbeat mom".

In August 2022, media personality Désirée Nick interviewed Nathalie Volk on her podcast. Volk stated "What could be easier than to play your power over little girls who trust you? That is morally very questionable, like everything Heidi Klum has ever done". season 4 contestant Tessa Bergmeier described Klum as a "super-mega psycho". Papis Loveday, who also worked on GNTM, added about Klum: "She only thinks of herself. Nobody can shine more than she does." In February 2023, the former judge Peyman Armin criticized the show and Klum, saying "It has become a pure self-portrayal by Heidi. Heidi comes first. Then Heidi and Heidi again. When Heidi Klum is in the foreground and takes care of the slapstick, for sensational shootings and catfights." In April 2023, Heidi Klum said about everything that happens at GNTM: "At the end of the day I'm the boss and I make the rules!"

==== ZDF's 2023 investigative documentary ====
In June 2023, the German TV broadcaster ZDF released a 70-minute investigative documentary about the machinations of the makers of GNTM called "Pressure, hatred, manipulation: how sick does Germany's Next Topmodel make you?" For this documentary, around 50 former contestants, judges and members of the show's crew were interviewed, some anonymously. The makers of the documentary admitted that they are familiar with difficult investigations, but they have never experienced it before that so many people were afraid to talk about what happened as these former participants and employees of GNTM. A crew member of the show who wished to remain anonymous is quoted as saying: "If you film a young woman from morning to night, you'll get every sectional image you want. So you can cut and tell what you want. A lot of things are cut together wildly. The jobs depend on it. It's about ratings."

In addition, former contestants report how the show's editors deliberately foment manipulation, lies and discord among the contestants behind the scenes. The contestants are shielded from the outside world so they lose their nerve and argue. So 20 candidates have to sleep together in one room without contact to the outside world. The statements by Heidi Klum, the broadcasting TV station ProSieben and the production company are presented as hypocrisy. ProSieben is said to have earned 87 million euros with season 18 and Klum 10 million euros. The contestants receive no money. GNTM has driven some contestants into depression and suicidal thoughts.

== Distribution ==
In the show's earlier seasons, physical home media releases were occasionally distributed in Germany, including a special highlight DVD for season 1 released by Warner Home Video in 2006, followed by a companion PC video game developed by SevenOne Intermedia in 2009 to coincide with season 4. Following shifts in consumer media habits, distribution transitioned primarily to digital spaces. Since 2023, following the complete restructuring and integration of ProSiebenSat.1's digital platforms, the series has been made available for live streaming and video-on-demand catch-up exclusively through the streaming service Joyn.
