= Germany's Next Topmodel season 8 =

Germany's Next Topmodel
- Season 8
- Judges: Heidi Klum; Thomas Hayo; Enrique Badulescu
- No. of contestants: 26
- Winner: Lovelyn Enebechi
- No. of episodes: 14

Release
- Original network: ProSieben
- Original release: 28 February – 30 May 2013

Season chronology
- ← Previous; Season 7 Next → Season 9

The eighth season of Germany's Next Topmodel aired on German television network ProSieben from 28 February to 30 May 2013 under the catch phrase Closer than ever.

Due to a decrease in ratings for the show, several changes were done. For the first time the show was produced by RedSeven GmbH, who were also previously producing Austria's Next Topmodel. Fashion photographer Enrique Badulescu joined the panel along with Thomas Hayo, who became the first judge - aside from Klum - since Peyman Amin returned for a third time to the show.

As in the last preceding years, this season featured a preselection without open castings. The first episode started off with 26 semifinalists of whom however only 25 were introduced to the audience. The show however was off with a disappointing launch as it showed a ratings drop in comparison to the last cycle's premiere.

The winner was 16-year-old Lovelyn Enebechi from Hamburg. Her prizes include:

- A modeling contract with Günther Klum's OneEins GmbH Management.
- A cover and spread in the German edition of Cosmopolitan.
- A limited-time apartment stay in a fashion capital of her choice.
- A €250,000 cash prize.
- An Opel Adam

The international destinations for this season were set in Dubai, Los Angeles, New York City and Honolulu.

== Contestants ==
(ages stated are at start of contest)

Contestant	Age	Height	Hometown	Finish	Place
Clara Zaveta	19	1.80 m (5 ft 11 in)	Hamburg	Episode 1	26 (quit)
Katharina Oltzow	16	1.84 m (6 ft 1/2 in)	Bad Arolsen	Episode 1	25
Merle Lambert	16	1.76 m (5 ft 9 1/2 in)	Goch	Episode 1	24 (quit)
Nancy Limonta	22	1.78 m (5 ft 10 in)	Dresden	Episode 1	23-21
Lisa Quack	17	1.76 m (5 ft 9 1/2 in)	Schüttorf	Episode 1	23-21
Linda Niewerth	17	1.80 m (5 ft 11 in)	Reken	Episode 1	23-21
Lisa-Giulia Wende	17	1.76 m (5 ft 9 1/2 in)	Hamburg	Episode 2	20
Michelle Maas	16	1.80 m (5 ft 11 in)	Tholey	Episode 2	19
Höpke Voss	19	1.76 m (5 ft 9 1/2 in)	Altenholz	Episode 3	18-17 (quit)
Bingyang Liu	18	1.80 m (5 ft 11 in)	Cologne	Episode 3	18-17 (quit)
Leandra Martin	18	1.82 m (5 ft 11 1/2 in)	Würzburg	Episode 3	16
Laura 'Sophie' Jais	23	1.78 m (5 ft 10 in)	Farchant	Episode 4	15 (quit)
Anna Seebrecht	16	1.76 m (5 ft 9 1/2 in)	Prien am Chiemsee	Episode 4	14
Jessika Weidner	16	1.78 m (5 ft 10 in)	Au am Rhein	Episode 5	13
Janna Wiese	19	1.76 m (5 ft 9 1/2 in)	Schortens	Episode 6	12
Veronika Weddeling	22	1.79 m (5 ft 10 1/2 in)	Borken	Episode 7	11
Jacqueline Thießen	16	1.76 m (5 ft 9 1/2 in)	Hamburg	Episode 8	10
Leonie Marwitz	16	1.76 m (5 ft 9 1/2 in)	Prien am Chiemsee	Episode 9	9
Carolin Sünderhauf	20	1.79 m (5 ft 10 1/2 in)	Munich	Episode 10	8
Christine Gischler	16	1.79 m (5 ft 10 1/2 in)	Essen	Episode 11	7
Marie Czuczman	16	1.83 m (6 ft 0 in)	Lüdenscheid	Episode 12	6
Anna Maria Damm	16	1.76 m (5 ft 9 1/2 in)	Neuenbürg	Episode 13	5
Sabrina Elsner	20	1.77 m (5 ft 9 1/2 in)	Gägelow	Episode 14	4
Luise Will	18	1.83 m (6 ft 0 in)	Rostock	Episode 14	3
Maike van Grieken	19	1.76 m (5 ft 9 1/2 in)	Emden	Episode 14	2
Lovelyn Enebechi	16	1.78 m (5 ft 10 in)	Hamburg	Episode 14	1

== Episode summaries ==
No. overall	No. in season	Title	Original release date
104	1	"Dream Come True"	28 February 2013
The episode began with Heidi visiting the 26 finalists in their hometowns to tell them they have made it onto Germany's Next Topmodel. The girls did a photo shoot in Wiesbaden. Shortly afterward, Clara decided to leave the competition. The 20 girls who impressed Heidi and Thomas were advanced through to the next round in Dubai. From the five worst-performing girls (Janna, Katharina, Lisa, Lisa-Giulia and Nancy), Katharina was chosen to leave the competition. The remaining 24 finalists were flown to Dubai, where they walk in a fashion show for Amato Haute Couture. Anna Maria and Sabrina were deemed the best performers. At elimination, Merle was chosen to move on to the next round, but asked to leave the competition, much to the disappointment of Heidi, Thomas and new judge, photographer Enrique Badulescu. The bottom four girls were Anna, Linda, Lisa and Nancy. Anna was chosen to advance and the other three girls were eliminated.: Quit: Clara Zaveta; First bottom five: Janna Wiese, Katharina Oltzow, Lisa Quack, Lisa-Giulia Wende & Nancy Limonta; Eliminated outside of panel: Katharina Oltzow; Quit: Merle Lambert; Second bottom four: Anna Seebrecht, Linda Niewerth, Lisa Quack & Nancy Limonta; Eliminated: Linda Niewerth, Lisa Quack & Nancy Limonta; Featured photographer: Andreas Ortner
105	2	"Shooting Edition"	7 March 2013
The girls were divided into two groups of ten, with one group modelling couture dresses while suspended from cranes and the other group shooting underwater. The bottom two girls for the high-rise shoot were Carolin and Lisa-Giulia. Carolin was saved and Lisa-Giulia was sent home. Luise was announced as the best performer at the underwater shoot. The judges said that all the girls did well, so they were all saved. Sophie comes out to the other girls as lesbian, and Anna Maria talks about her difficult childhood in the Philippines, where she lived in a slum. Sabrina receives the news that her grandmother has died. At elimination, Michelle is eliminated. Carolin lands in the bottom two for the second time, along with Anna, but both are saved. At the end of the episode, Heidi reveals that the journey continues in Los Angeles.: First bottom two: Carolin Sünderhauf & Lisa-Giulia Wende; Eliminated outside of panel: Lisa-Giulia Wende; Best performer: Luise Will; First eliminated: Michelle Maas; Second bottom two: Carolin Sünderhauf & Anna Barbara Seebrecht; Second eliminated: None; Featured photographers: Enrique Badulescu, Rankin, & Russ Kientsch
106	3	"Beauty Edition"	14 March 2013
The girls arrive in Los Angeles and are greeted by Heidi, who informs them that two girls have left the competition: Höpke, who withdrew for personal reasons, and Bingyang, who did not receive a visa. Makeovers are administered to girls before the photo shoots. For the first shoot, they take photos for a sedcard, and for the second, they are taken to a hospital and pose with male model Rick "Zombie Boy" Genest. At elimination, Leandra and Leonie land in the bottom two with Leandra being eliminated.: Quit: Höpke Voß & Bingyang Liu; Bottom two: Leandra Martin & Leonie Marwitz; Eliminated: Leandra Martin; Featured photographers: Enrique Badulescu & Robert Erdmann
107	4	"Runway Edition"	21 March 2013
The episode begins with Carolin being told that she has been booked by a designer for Hong Kong Fashion Week. This week's topic is Runway. The girls are taught three different styles of walk with the assistance of three models for each walk - the sexy walk taught by Irina Shayk, Prêt-à-porter by Jessica Stam and Haute Couture by Chanel Iman. At the training for the sexy walk, Lovelyn and Leonie are deemed best while Luise, Sophie and Anna Maria perform best at the Prêt-à-porter training. The photo shoot is a face shot. The girls walk as geishas in an Haute-couture-walk. Sophie is deemed to have the best walk and photo, but quits due personal reasons. She is allowed to keep her photo. Anna, Janna, Christine and Maike land in the bottom four. Anna is ultimately eliminated.: Booked for job & immune from elimination: Carolin Sünderhauf; Quit: Sophie Jais; Bottom four: Anna Seebrecht, Christine Grischler, Janna Wiese & Maike van Grieken; Eliminated: Anna Seebrecht; Special guests: Chanel Iman, Irina Shayk, & Jessica Stam; Featured client: Hong Kong Fashion Week
108	5	"Film Edition"	28 March 2013
The remaining girls did a video shoot with different briefs. They also had a challenge where they had to act a scene in front of a green wall and sitting in a car. The challenge winners were Anna Maria and Leonie. At elimination, Sabrina was criticized for having a bad attitude in front of the make up artist. Veronika is told she has also great potential to become an actor because of her fantastic performance. Christine, Janna, Jessika, Lovelyn and Sabrina landed in the bottom five and Jessika is eliminated.: Challenge winner: Anna Maria Damm & Leonie Marwitz; Bottom five: Christine Grischler, Janna Wiese, Jessika Weidner, Lovelyn Enebechi & Sabrina Elsner; Eliminated: Jessika Weidner; Featured director: Jonas Åkerlund; Special guest: Thomas Rath
109	6	"Sports Edition"	4 April 2013
The girls wake up early to do sport with a rugby team. The photo shoot is about boxing. Christine and Janna perform worst while Maike is deemed best. At the casting for an editorial in the German Gala, Sabrina, Marie and Carolin are booked. At the job, Carolin performs best. The girls then perform in a fashion half-time show during a basketball game. In the end, Janna is eliminated for her bad photo shoot and a fauxpas on the runway. Jacqueline is also heavily criticized and told to perform better next week. The remaining 11 girls go to New York City.: Best performer: Maike van Grieken; Booked for job: Carolin Sünderhauf, Marie Czuczman & Sabrina Elsner; Eliminated: Janna Wiese; Featured photographers: Enrique Badulescu & Tim Petersen; Featured client: Gala
110	7	"New York/Casting Edition"	11 April 2013
In New York, the girls do a group photo shoot on a bus. Maike and Lovelyn are deemed best and get to go to the AmfAR gala with Heidi as reward for their performance. The girls are sent to castings for New York Fashion Week. Marie and Anna Maria both walk in two shows, Lovelyn, Maike, Luise and Carolin are booked for one show. During a meeting at IMG Models, Luise is called a million dollar face. Last year's winner, Luisa, is also seen walking in one of the shows the girls walk in. At panel, Veronika and Jacqueline are in the bottom two in the wake of their weak performance during the week's photoshoot. Even though Jacqueline's walk is worse than Veronika's, the judges feel that Veronika's potential is exhausted and let Jacqueline advance to the next round.: Best performer: Lovelyn Enebechi & Maike van Grieken; Booked for job: Anna Maria Damm (x2), Marie Czuczman (x2), Carolin Sünderhauf, Lovelyn Enebechi, Luise Will & Maike van Grieken; Bottom two: Jacqueline Thießen & Veronika Weddeling; Eliminated: Veronika Weddeling; Featured photographer: Matt McCabe; Featured clients: amFAR, IMG Models, & New York Fashion Week
111	8	"Sexy Edition"	18 April 2013
The girls do a sexy photo shoot in lingerie. Lovelyn is deemed best again. When Heidi goes shopping with Jacqueline because of her bad outfits, the other girls feel treated unfairly. At a casting for German Cosmopolitan Maike, Marie, Leonie, Anna Maria and Carolin reach the second round with Maike, Carolin and Anna Maria being booked. Alessandra Ambrosio teaches the girls how to do a sexy walk as part of this week's theme and also serves as a guest judge. Leonie and Jacqueline are in the bottom two. It's not revealed who gets eliminated, leaving the episode with a cliffhanger.: Best performer: Lovelyn Enebechi; Booked for job: Anna Maria Damm, Carolin Sünderhauf & Maike van Grieken; Bottom three: Carolin Sünderhauf, Jacqueline Thießen & Leonie Marwitz; Eliminated: See below; Featured photographer: Ben Watts; Special guest: Alessandra Ambrosio; Featured client: Cosmopolitan Germany
112	9	"Transformation Edition"	25 April 2013
The episode picks up directly were last week's episode ended with a cliffhanger. It is revealed that Jacqueline is sent home. The week starts with a casting for German Joy. The girls are told to embody different types of characters while walking around in the pedestrian street. While Luise, Marie and Sabrina reach the second round, Carolin is the only one to struggle. In the end Marie gets booked her fourth job. Luise, Lovelyn, Marie, Maike, Anna Maria and Sabrina get great feedback for their photos, while Carolin, Christine and Leonie are criticized. At panel, Heidi tells Maike she had been the best at the shoot. At the casting for Opel, Lovelyn books her second job. A controversial remark by Maike regarding what type of looks Opel is looking for leads to her ostracization by the other contestants. At panel, each of the girls has to present three different styles of runway. Leonie is sent home for her weak performance at both photo shoot and runway. Christine and Carolin are also heavily criticized.: First eliminated: Jacqueline Thießen; Best performer: Maike van Grieken; Booked for job: Lovelyn Enebechi & Marie Czuczman; Second eliminated: Leonie Marwitz; Featured director: Tim Löhr; Featured photographers: Bob Landers & Kristian Schuller; Featured clients: Joy & Opel
113	10	"Action Edition"	2 May 2013
The girls do an action shoot with jetpacks over water. Luise is deemed best and wins the price to go shopping with Lena Gercke, winner of cycle one while Carolin is the weakest. At the second photo shoot where they drop from a building as spies Carolin struggles again while Christine surprises the judges. At a catwalk teaching with Erin Heatherton, drama emerges because of sample-sized jeans. At panel, Carolin and Marie are deemed the weakest. Carolin is sent home because the judges feel that the others girls have overperformed her. The remaining girls go to Hawaii.: Challenge winner & best peeformer: Luise Will; Bottom two: Carolin Sünderhauf & Marie Czuczman; Eliminated: Carolin Sünderhauf; Featured photographers: Derek Kettela & Oliver S.; Special guest: Erin Heatherton
114	11	"Hawaii Edition"	9 May 2013
The girls arrive at Hawaii, where they go camping with Heidi. The weekly shoot is dedicated to shooting each girl in an individual editorial. Luise and Sabrina have fully nude shoots. At this week's casting Anna Maria is booked for an editorial and cover shoot for a surfer's magazine. At panel, Thomas Hayo criticizes Luise for going blank at the casting and Marie for not taking care of her physique. Anna-Maria is criticized for her photoshoot and is told that, if she had not won the casting, she could have been sent home as well. However, Christine gets eliminated as she is the weakest at the weekly photo shoot as well as for her overall weak performances over the past couple of weeks.: Booked for job: Anna Maria Damm; Eliminated: Christine Gischler; Featured photographer: Enrique Badulescu; Featured client: Surfers Magazine
115	12	"Music Edition"	16 May 2013
The premise of this week's episode is to embody music icons. Maike is deemed the weakest while Anna Maria and Sabrina perform the best. At the casting for Maybelline, Luise, Anna Maria and Maike reach the second round. Luise and Anna Maria are told that it was a neck and neck between the two, but Luise ultimately gets picked as her beauty-shots are stronger than Anna Maria's. While Luise shoots the campaign, the other girls go to a casting for a music video of the song "Without you" for English boy band, Blue. Anna Maria is booked for the main role while Sabrina, Maike and Marie are booked for supporting roles. Lovelyn is the only one without a job this week. At panel, Marie and Maike land in the bottom two. Although Marie has a better week, Maike has had a stronger overall performance. Marie places sixth.: Booked for job: Luise Will, Anna-Maria Damm, Marie Czuczman, Maike van Grieken, Sabrina Elsner; Bottom two: Maike van Grieken & Marie Czuczman; Eliminated: Marie Czuczman; Featured photographers: Brian Bowen Smith & Kristian Schuller; Featured clients: Blue & Maybelline New York
116	13	"Semifinale-Evolution Edition"	23 May 2013
At the casting for Gillette Luise, Lovelyn and Maike reach the second round. Luise wins the casting and Lovelyn is disappointed for only placing second. Anna Maria struggles at this week's photo shoot for Cosmopolitan cover. At panel, the girls have to walk in Prêt-à-porter, Sexy and Haute couture outfits. Luise is the first girl to reach the final. Anna Maria is eliminated before Lovelyn also reaches the final. Maike and Sabrina land in the bottom two for struggling on the runway. Surprisingly, both reach the final.: Booked for job: Luise Will; First eliminated: Anna Maria Damm; Bottom two: Maike van Grieken & Sabrina Elsner; Second eliminated: None; Featured director: Katja Brauer-Baratin; Featured photographer: Warwick Saint; Special guest: Petra Gessulat; Featured client: Gillette Venus
117	14	"Live finale"	30 May 2013
The final starts with the girls walking as Superwomen. During a live performance by Robin Thicke, the girls walk the runway and pose in Burlesque style. The girls third challenge is to walk as the four elements with High fashion dresses and poses. Maike embodies fire, Sabrina is water and Luise is earth which leaves air to Lovelyn. After the walk Sabrina is eliminated. The remaining girls do a photo shoot on stilts where Maike is deemed best. Afterwards they have to walk in futuristic outfits. Luise is second to be eliminated. Anna Maria is chosen to open the Top-20-walk after online voting between the girls who didn't reach the final. The Top 20-walk is done with a live performance by PSY. The final two have to pose in a surprise photo shoot where they have to dance. Lovelyn impresses once again. In the end, Lovelyn becomes Germany's Next Topmodel.: Final four: Lovelyn Enebechi, Luise Will, Maike van Grieken & Sabrina Elsner; Eliminated: Sabrina Elsner; Final three: Lovelyn Enebechi, Luise Will & Maike van Grieken; Eliminated: Luise Will; Top 20 walk opener: Anna Maria Damm; Final two: Lovelyn Enebechi & Maike van Grieken; Germany's Next Topmodel: Lovelyn Enebechi; Featured photographer: Enrique Badulescu; Special guests: Bruno Mars, Psy, & Robin Thicke

== Summaries ==
=== Results table ===
Place	Model	Episodes															
Place	Model	1 (Note: In episode 1, Clara and Merle decided to quit the competition after the photo shoot. Katharina was eliminated outside of panel for her poor performance during the photo shoot.)	2 (Note: In episode 2, Lisa-Giulia was eliminated outside of panel for her poor performance during the photoshoot.)	3 (Note: In episode 3, Höpke and Bingyang decided to quit the competition.)	4 (Note: In episode 4, Carolin was booked for the job and was granted immunity from elimination. Furthermore, Sophie decided to quit the competition.)	5	6	7	8 (Note: In episode 8, Carolin, Jacqueline, and Leonie landed in the bottom three. The episode ended in a cliffhanger and their fate remained unknown until the beginning of episode 9, where it was revealed that Jacqueline was eliminated from the competition.)	9	10 (Note: In episode 10, Luise won the challenge and was granted immunity from elimination.)	11	12	13	14		
1	Lovelyn	SAFE	SAFE	SAFE	SAFE	LOW	SAFE	HIGH	HIGH	SAFE	SAFE	SAFE	SAFE	SAFE	SAFE	SAFE	WIN
2	Maike	SAFE	SAFE	SAFE	LOW	SAFE	HIGH	HIGH	SAFE	HIGH	SAFE	SAFE	LOW	LOW	LOW	LOW	OUT
3	Luise	SAFE	HIGH	SAFE	SAFE	SAFE	SAFE	SAFE	SAFE	SAFE	HIGH	SAFE	SAFE	SAFE	SAFE	OUT	
4	Sabrina	SAFE	SAFE	SAFE	SAFE	LOW	SAFE	SAFE	SAFE	SAFE	SAFE	SAFE	SAFE	LOW	OUT		
5	Anna Maria	SAFE	SAFE	SAFE	SAFE	SAFE	SAFE	SAFE	SAFE	SAFE	SAFE	SAFE	SAFE	OUT			
6	Marie	SAFE	SAFE	SAFE	SAFE	SAFE	SAFE	SAFE	SAFE	SAFE	LOW	LOW	OUT				
7	Christine	SAFE	SAFE	SAFE	LOW	LOW	SAFE	SAFE	SAFE	LOW	SAFE	OUT					
8	Carolin	SAFE	LOW	SAFE	IMM	SAFE	SAFE	SAFE	LOW	LOW	OUT						
9	Leonie	SAFE	SAFE	LOW	SAFE	SAFE	SAFE	SAFE	LOW	OUT							
10	Jacqueline	SAFE	SAFE	SAFE	SAFE	SAFE	SAFE	LOW	OUT								
11	Veronika	SAFE	SAFE	SAFE	SAFE	SAFE	SAFE	OUT									
12	Janna	SAFE	SAFE	SAFE	LOW	LOW	OUT										
13	Jessika	SAFE	SAFE	SAFE	SAFE	OUT											
14	Anna	LOW	LOW	LOW	OUT												
15	Sophie	SAFE	SAFE	SAFE	QUIT												
16	Leandra	SAFE	SAFE	OUT													
17–18	Bingyang	SAFE	SAFE	QUIT													
17–18	Höpke	SAFE	SAFE	QUIT													
19	Michelle	SAFE	OUT														
20	Lisa-Giulia	SAFE	OUT														
21–23	Linda	OUT															
21–23	Lisa	OUT															
21–23	Nancy	OUT															
24	Merle	QUIT															
25	Katharina	OUT															
26	Clara	QUIT															

The contestant won best photo
The contestant quit the competition
The contestant was immune from elimination
The contestant was in danger of elimination
The contestant was eliminated
The contestant won the competition

=== Photo shoot guide ===
- Episode 1 photo shoot: Haute couture in Wiesbaden
- Episode 2 photo shoots: Posing underwater; harnessed to a Crane in couture gowns; desert beauty shots
- Episode 3 photo shoots: Sedcard; taken by Zombie Boy to the underworld
- Episode 4 photo shoot: 'Flower power' beauty shots
- Episode 5 photo shoot: Model mug shots
- Episode 6 photo shoot: Boxing in pairs
- Episode 7 photo shoot: New York City sight-seeing
- Episode 8 photo shoot: Rodeo Drive street walkers
- Episode 9 photo shoot: Mystical fairies in the woods
- Episode 10 photo shoot: Rooftop spies
- Episode 11 photo shoot: Editorials in Hawaii
- Episode 12 photo shoot: Famous musicians
- Episode 13 photo shoot: Cosmopolitan covers

== Controversy ==
Episode 8 ended with a cliffhanger, but the fate of the bottom two was "accidentally" revealed on the official website of ProSieben two days before the broadcasting of episode 9. Another faux pas happened during Episode 9. The remaining girls competed for an Opel commercial but before the winner of that was revealed, the spot has already been shown on television.

In Episode 13, the 'top 3' for the live finale were going to be selected, but before the episode aired, it was revealed online and in badly edited episode promos that four girls actually made it through, and Anna Maria was eliminated. As a result, the cycle has come under heavy criticism from many viewers due to the mishaps in editing, fan favorites being eliminated, and the season's ardent focus on quarrels amongst its contestants.

During the live finale, topless FEMEN activists led by Zana Ramadani stormed the stage calling the show "Heidi's Horror Picture Show".
