= Germany's Next Topmodel season 9 =

2014 television show

Germany's Next Topmodel
- Season 9
- Cycle 9 cast
- Judges: Heidi Klum; Thomas Hayo; Wolfgang Joop
- No. of contestants: 25
- Winner: Stefanie Giesinger
- No. of episodes: 15

Release
- Original network: ProSieben
- Original release: 6 February – 8 May 2014

Season chronology
- ← Previous; Season 8 Next → Season 10

The ninth season of Germany's Next Topmodel aired on German television network ProSieben from 6 February to 8 May 2014 under the catch phrase Show Yourself.

The judging panel for this season consists of Thomas Hayo and Wolfgang Joop. This judging panel would remain unchanged until the following season.

As in the last preceding years, a preselection was done and open castings were not part of the show anymore. The first episode started with 25 finalists, which were selected from the initial 70 semifinalists.

The winner of the competition was 17-year-old Stefanie Giesinger from Kaiserlautern. Her prizes include:

- A modeling contract with Günther Klum's OneEins GmbH Management.
- A cover and spread in the German edition of Cosmopolitan.
- An Opel Adam

The international destinations for this season were set in Singapore, Los Angeles, Mumbai, Salt Lake City, Paris, New York City, and Malé.

== Contestants ==
(ages stated are at start of contest)

Contestant	Age	Height	Hometown	Finish	Place
Jill Schmitz	22	1.77 m (5 ft 9 1/2 in)	Pétange, Luxembourg	Episode 1	25-24
Lisa Seibert	18	1.78 m (5 ft 10 in)	Wiesbaden	Episode 1	25-24
Pauline Cottin	18	1.78 m (5 ft 10 in)	Trier	Episode 2	23-20 (quit)
Laura Haas	19	1.76 m (5 ft 9 1/2 in)	München	Episode 2	23-20 (quit)
Ina Bartak	21	1.76 m (5 ft 9 1/2 in)	München	Episode 2	23-20 (quit)
Fata Hasanovic	18	1.76 m (5 ft 9 1/2 in)	Berlin	Episode 2	23-20 (quit)
Franziska Wimmer	17	1.84 m (6 ft 1/2 in)	Neumarkt-Sankt Veit	Episode 2	19
Laura Kristen	18	1.76 m (5 ft 9 1/2 in)	Schauenstein	Episode 3	18
Emma Kahlert	16	1.76 m (5 ft 9 1/2 in)	Heidelberg	Episode 4	17
Antonia Balzer	16	1.76 m (5 ft 9 1/2 in)	Hoppegarten	Episode 5	16
Simona Hartl	17	1.76 m (5 ft 9 1/2 in)	Roding	Episode 6	15-14
Jana Heinisch	19	1.76 m (5 ft 9 1/2 in)	Bremen	Episode 6	15-14
Sainabou Sosseh	16	1.77 m (5 ft 9 1/2 in)	Bremen	Episode 7	13
Lisa Gelbrich	17	1.76 m (5 ft 9 1/2 in)	Harztor	Episode 8	12
Sarah Weinfurter	16	1.76 m (5 ft 9 1/2 in)	Kassel	Episode 10	11
Anna Wilken	17	1.81 m (5 ft 11 1/2 in)	Wittmund	Episode 11	10 (quit)
Samantha Brock	17	1.79 m (5 ft 10 1/2 in)	Berlin	Episode 11	9
Nancy Nagel	21	1.78 m (5 ft 10 in)	Schneeberg	Episode 13	8-7
Karlin Obiango	17	1.76 m (5 ft 9 1/2 in)	Ludwigshafen	Episode 13	8-7
Aminata Sanogo	18	1.78 m (5 ft 10 in)	Bergisch Gladbach	Episode 14	6-4
Nathalie Volk	16	1.75 m (5 ft 9 in)	Soltau	Episode 14	6-4
Betty Taube	18	1.76 m (5 ft 9 1/2 in)	Trebbin	Episode 14	6-4
Ivana Teklic	18	1.78 m (5 ft 10 in)	Bad Homburg	Episode 15	3
Jolina Fust	16	1.81 m (5 ft 11 1/2 in)	Hamburg	Episode 15	2
Stefanie Giesinger	17	1.77 m (5 ft 9 1/2 in)	Kaiserslautern	Episode 15	1

== Episode summaries ==
No. overall	No. in season	Title	Original release date
118	1	"Berlin to Singapore"	6 February 2014
The first episode of Germany's Next Topmodel 2014 starts at Berlin's Tempodrom where, out of the thousands who had applied and attended casting calls nationwide, 70 of Germany's most gorgeous women fought for the top 25 spots on offer. This year's judging panel along with host Heidi Klum, consists of regular judge Thomas Hayo and newcomer to the top model series (but renowned fashion designer) Wolfgang Joop. After the 25 finalists were chosen, Heidi announced that the girls would be flying to Singapore. Upon arrival to the luxurious Sentosa Island hotel, beds were chosen and friendships forged. The next day, the girls are met down by the pool with Heidi and this week's photographer Christian Anwander for their very first photo-shoot: a bikini shoot. Some girls excel, in particular Aminata, Ivana, Jolina and Nancy while others fall flat. The girls do a runway training afterwards where Nancy and Jolina surprise the judges, but in the end Ivana is deemed best. In the end it was Lisa S. and Luxembourgian contestant Jill who did not impress the judges, and both were eliminated from the competition.: Eliminated: Jill Schmitz & Lisa Seibert; Featured photographer: Christian Anwander
119	2	"If Heidi does not come, then it is serious"	13 February 2014
This episode, the 23 remaining contestants the girls are put under the pressure of their very first runway challenge at one of Singapore's very own fashion shows, Digital Fashion Week, where Jolina is chosen to open and Nathalie to close the show. Later, a photo-shoot at Gardens by the Bay has the girls posing with a snake, where Ivana produces the best picture, followed by Jolina, Sarah and Aminata. Unable to attend both the Fashion Show and photo-shoot, Heidi leaves a recorded video telling the girls they are all heading to Los Angeles. Here, one by one, the girls are assessed on both their walk and photos. Unable to impress the judges this week is Franziska who is sent home, whilst the 18 remaining girls move into the mansion. Fata Hasanovic who was forced to withdraw due to a lack of a visa returned in cycle 11 where she placed third.: Quit: Fata Hasanovic, Ina Bartak, Laura Haas & Pauline Cottin; Eliminated: Franziska Wimmer; Featured photographer: Christian Anwander
120	3	"Makeovers!-Style Edition"	20 February 2014
In Episode 3, the girls receive their makeovers. Some find it hard to part with their old looks, whilst others are happy to undergo the change. Samantha is praised for her fantastic long hair that is dyed in orange. Later at the photo shoot, the girls will be flying high as this photo-shoot challenges them to overcome heights. Ivana, Jolina, and Samantha impress the judges the most with their sed cards, however, five girls are able to earn their immunity for their performances at the other photo shoot: Ivana, Nancy, Nathalie, Sainabou and Antonia. The judges also note Sarah's improvement in her walk, however, Stefanie, Jana, Emma and Laura are unable to impress leaving the latter as the eliminee for her lack of progress.: Immune from elimination: Antonia Balzer, Ivana Teklic, Nancy Nagel, Nathalie Volk & Sainabou Sosseh; Bottom four: Emma Kahlert, Jana Heinisch, Laura Kristen & Stefanie Giesinger; Eliminated: Laura Kristen; Featured photographer: Oliver S. & Brian Bowen Smith
121	4	"Body Edition"	5 March 2014
With this week's focus on the body, the girls head to their casting for Shape magazine, where Stefanie, Betty, Simona, Samantha, Sainabou and Antonia impress the client. In the end, Antonia is the one to be booked. Later, the girls perform in the opening trailer shoot shot by Rankin. Heidi notes Nathalie, Aminata and Anna as stand-outs while Jolina, Stefanie, and Emma disappoint. At judging, Ivana and Aminata perform best while Sarah, Stefanie, Lisa, and Nancy are critiqued for their walks as well as Jolina and Emma for their video-shoot, thus placing in the bottom five. Stefanie fails at both and lands herself in the bottom two, however, it is Emma who the judges feel is just not ready yet and is sent packing.: Booked for job: Antonia Balzer; Bottom five: Emma Kahlert, Jolina Fust, Nancy Nagel, Sarah Weinfurter & Stefanie Giesinger; Eliminated: Emma Kahlert; Featured photographer: Michael Reh & Rankin; Special guest: Alessandra Ambrosio; Featured client: Shape Germany
122	5	"Boys Edition"	12 March 2014
With the focus of the week being interaction with male models, the girls head off to select male models for their shoot where Ivana flirts with one of the male models despite having a boyfriend. The shoot this week takes place on Malibu beach, shot by renowned photographer Gilles Bensimon. The girls have to shoot in pairs with male models, most of the girls leave Heidi disappointed, however, Ivana, Simona, and Nancy stand-out. The challenge later follows where the girls have to film a commercial with a male model, Samantha and Antonia leave Thomas Hayo unimpressed, while Lisa's performance is said to be horrible and even making judge Wolfgang Joop laugh, but it is Sarah who delivers the best performance earning herself immunity, with Sainabou being second. Lisa, Antonia, and Samantha are chastised at judging for their dull performances in both the shoot and the challenge, but Lisa enjoys kind of a puppy license while Samantha is said to have more potential, thus Antonia is sent home.: Challenge winner & immune from elimination: Sarah Weinfurter; Bottom three: Antonia Balzer, Lisa Gelbrich & Samantha Brock; Eliminated: Antonia Balzer; Featured photographer: Gilles Bensimon
123	6	"Transformation Edition"	19 March 2014
The week starts with a casting for German Cosmopolitan where Jolina, Karlin, Nancy, and Anna reach the second round with only Jolina and Karlin booked. In the first photo shoot, the girls are divided into groups where some of them have to play the role of men or boys. Ivana, Nathalie, and Nancy are deemed best. In the second photo shoot, the girls are body painted and have to pose with spiders. The photographer Rankin books Karlin, Aminata, Betty, and Samantha for his magazine, but only Samantha's pictures are published in the magazine. Simona and Jana are sent home for their problems at the photo shoots.: Booked for job: Jolina Fust, Karlin Obiango & Samantha Brock; Immune from elimination: Aminata Sanogo, Betty Taube, Ivana Teklic & Nathalie Volk; Bottom two: Jana Heinisch & Sarah Weinfurter; Eliminated: Jana Heinisch & Simona Hartl; Featured photographers: Thomas Hayo & Rankin; Featured client: Cosmopolitan Germany
124	7	"Extreme Edition"	26 March 2014
In this week's photo shoot, the girls have to be hysterical divas who go ballistic, which makes Sarah, Lisa, Sainabou, and Aminata struggle while Ivana, Betty and Nathalie perform best. In the casting for Emmi AG Jolina, Stefanie, Samantha, Sarah, and Nancy reach the second round where Jolina gets her second job and thus flies to India. The girls have to present extreme outfits at panel, where Ivana's walk is, like always, deemed best. In the end, Sainabou is eliminated for her bad performance at both: photo shoot and runway.: Booked for job: Jolina Fust; Best performer: Betty Taube; Bottom three: Aminata Sanogo, Sainabou Sosseh & Sarah Weinfurter; Eliminated: Sainabou Sosseh; Featured photographer: Matt McCabe & Rankin; Featured client: Emmi AG
125	8	"Road Trip Edition"	2 April 2014
In the beginning, Wolfgang Joop books Ivana and Samantha for his Wunderkind show at Paris Fashion Week. After that the girls do a photo shoot in Utah where Stefanie, Nathalie, and Betty perform best, while Lisa, Karlin, Sarah, and Nancy are unable to impress. It is also the first time for Ivana to fail at a photo shoot. The girls also produce a fashion film, where Ivana, Nancy, and Jolina impress while Stefanie, Lisa, Karlin, Sarah, and Anna fall flat. Ivana's walk is once again deemed best. In the end, Lisa is eliminated for being not as good as the other girls and not understanding the judges' critiques.: Booked for job: Ivana Teklic & Samantha Brock; Best performer: Stefanie Giesinger; Bottom three: Karlin Obiango, Lisa Gelbrich & Sarah Weinfurter; Eliminated: Lisa Gelbrich; Featured photographer: Christian Anwander & Thomas Hayo; Featured client: Wunderkind
126	9	"Expression Edition"	9 April 2014
This week's first photo shoot takes place at an old train station where the girls have to cry as if they would move away. In the second photo shoot, they have to give different emotions they are told. Ivana is deemed best at the photo shoot. Samantha and Sarah are the weakest at the photo shoots, and Nancy struggles on the runway heavily, thus making them land in the bottom three. In contrast to them, Ivana's and Jolina's walks are deemed perfect. Though reaching the next round, Nancy behaves rudely to Heidi when getting her photo, which annoys the judges.: Challenge winner: Ivana Teklic; Bottom three: Nancy Nagel, Samantha Brock & Sarah Weinfurter; Eliminated: None; Featured photographer: Robert Erdmann & Thomas Hayo
127	10	"Fashion Week Edition"	16 April 2014
The girls head back to Berlin for a big week of castings. The girls head to various designers where Jolina, Ivana, and Nancy are booked as runway models. Jolina is praised for being booked for all three shows. The girls also visit the casting for Joy magazine, where Anna, Samantha, and Karlin are selected. The rest of the girls tour Berlin's sights where Nathalie hypocritically asserts she is happy not to be chosen, saying she will only walk in Paris. The shoot takes place back in LA, however, Karlin's visa is rejected forcing her to remain in Berlin while she awaits a new one. Most of the girls impress at the photo shoot, with Ivana, Aminata, and Samantha performing best and Betty, Sarah, and Nathalie struggling. At judging, the girls walk in outfits designed by Wolfgang, where Sarah is once again castigated for regressing in performance, and she is sent home. Jolina is advised to show more personality.: Booked for job: Anna Wilken, Jolina Fust, Ivana Teklic, Karlin Obiango, Nancy Nagel, & Samantha Brock; Bottom three: Betty Taube, Nathalie Volk, & Sarah Weinfurter; Eliminated: Sarah Weinfurter; Featured photographer: Enrique Badulescu; Featured clients: Berlin Fashion Week & Joy
128	11	"Sexy Edition"	23 April 2014
The week starts with a runway training where Ivana, Betty, and Aminata are deemed best while Samantha and Anna are the worst. Heidi and Wolfgang Joop try to persuade Jolina to let her hair to be cut short, but Jolina bursts in tears and refuses it. At the casting for Opel, Stefanie, Jolina, and Betty are the best, with Stefanie getting her first job. At the photo shoot, Stefanie, Samantha, and Anna struggle. These three are also the ones to struggle at the catwalk, where the girls have to walk in Victoria's Secret underwear and wings. While Stefanie reaches the next round because of her job, Samantha and Anna land in the bottom two. Though Anna quits the competition, Samantha is sent home.: Booked for job: Stefanie Giesinger; Bottom two: Anna Wilken & Samantha Brock; Quit: Anna Wilken; Eliminated: Samantha Brock; Featured photographer: Fransesco Carrozini; Featured client: Opel
129	12	"Girls Edition"	30 April 2014
The girls have a press training where Betty earns herself immunity because of her excellent performance. This week's casting is for Maybelline. Jolina, Ivana, Stefanie, and Nathalie are the last four. As later revealed, it has been a race head to head between Jolina and Ivana that resulted in Jolinas sixth job. At the photo shoot where the girls have to pose with little children, Nancy bursts into tears missing her own son. Ivana, Stefanie, and Jolina perform best. Aminata struggles at the catwalk, which makes her the original eliminee, but she is saved after it is established asthma caused the problem. Jolina is also critiqued for her walk. Ivana even starts to debate with Wolfgang, defending Aminata. For the second time in the cycle, no girl is eliminated.: Re-entered: Karlin Obiango; Booked for job: Jolina Fust; Challenge winner & immune from elimination: Betty Taube; Eliminated: None; Featured photographer: Christian Anwander & Kristian Schuller; Featured client: Maybelline New York
130	13	"Real World Edition"	7 May 2014
This week's photo shoot is the cover of German Cosmopolitan, which is one of the winning prices. At the shoot, Betty, Stefanie, Jolina, Ivana, and Aminata are deemed best while Nancy and Karlin have problems. When visiting an agency, Jolina gets the offer to sign with Elite Model Management. At a casting for New York Fashion Week, only Jolina and Ivana reach the second round, with Ivana booked for her fourth job resulting in Ivana's immunity. At a press conference, Stefanie stirs everybody to tears when talking about her severe disease. After the catwalk, Nancy and Karlin are sent home.: Signed with an agency: Jolina Fust; Booked for job & immune from elimination: Ivana Teklic; Eliminated: Karlin Obiango & Nancy Nagel; Featured photographer: Brian Bowen Smith & Petra Gessulat; Featured client: New York Fashion Week
131	14	"Semi-Finals"	10 May 2014
It is the first time there are six girls in the semifinals. At the casting for Gillette Venus, Jolina reaches the second round once again, along with Betty and Nathalie. In the end, it is Betty who wins the casting. At the photo shoot, none of the girls struggle, but Ivana's picture is later deemed best. At the last catwalk before the final, only Ivana and Jolina are able to fully convince the judges. Jolina is the first girl to reach the final with having been booked for six jobs, but is critiqued for not showing enough personality. After her, Ivana, who has been booked for four jobs, is able to reach the final. The third girl to be called out is Aminata who is eliminated as well as Nathalie, which leaves Betty and Stefanie who are called out together. In the end, Stefanie reaches the final because of her progress and her amazing charm, which makes Betty the third eliminee. The three finalists and the 3 eliminated girls travel to the Maldives for a few days.: Booked for job: Betty Taube; Bottom two: Betty Taube & Stefanie Giesinger; Eliminated: Aminata Sanogo, Betty Taube & Nathalie Volk; Featured photographer: Kristian Schuller; Featured client: Gillette Venus
132	15	"Live Finale"	14 May 2014
In the final, Jolina is deemed to be the best in the photo shoot, and Ivana wins the challenge to design an outfit herself and to present it on the runway. The girls also have to choose the staging and the music. Ivana is eliminated first despite being this cycle's catwalk queen, being this cycle's most consistent candidate, and winning the design challenge where Wolfgang Joop states Ivana's outfit and walk were definitely the best. Wolfgang also asserts that Ivana was his favorite, but Heidi and Thomas voted for the other girls. Betty is chosen to open the Top 20 walk after online voting between the girls who did not reach the final. In the end, Stefanie is chosen as the winner of the competition.: Top 20 walk opener: Betty Taube; Final three: Ivana Teklic, Jolina Fust and Stefanie Giesinger; Eliminated: Ivana Teklic; Final two: Jolina Fust & Stefanie Giesinger; Germany's Next Topmodel: Stefanie Giesinger; Featured photographer: Christian Anwander

== Summaries ==
=== Results table ===
Place	Model	Episodes															
Place	Model	1	2 (Note: In episode 2, Fata, Ina, Laura, and Pauline decided to quit the competition.)	3 (Note: In episode 3, Antonia, Ivana, Nancy, Nathalie, and Sainabou, were granted immunity from elimination.)	4	5 (Note: In episode 5, Sarah won the challenge and was granted immunity from elimination.)	6 (Note: In episode 6, Aminata, Betty, Ivana, and Nathalie were granted immunity from elimination.)	7	8	9 (Note: Episode 9 was a non-elimination.)	10	11 (Note: In episode 11, Anna decided to quit the competition.)	12 (Note: In episode 12, Karlin re-entered the competition. Betty won the challenge and was granted immunity from elimination. Furthermore, this episode was a non-elimination.)	13 (Note: In episode 13, Jolina was offered to sign with Elite Model Management. Furthermore, Ivana was booked for the job and was granted immunity from elimination.)	14	15	
1	Stefanie	SAFE	SAFE	LOW	LOW	SAFE	SAFE	SAFE	HIGH	SAFE	SAFE	SAFE	SAFE	SAFE	LOW	SAFE	WIN
2	Jolina	SAFE	SAFE	SAFE	LOW	SAFE	SAFE	SAFE	SAFE	SAFE	SAFE	SAFE	SAFE	SAFE	SAFE	LOW	OUT
3	Ivana	SAFE	SAFE	IMM	SAFE	SAFE	IMM	SAFE	SAFE	SAFE	SAFE	SAFE	SAFE	IMM	SAFE	OUT	
4–6	Aminata	SAFE	SAFE	SAFE	SAFE	SAFE	IMM	LOW	SAFE	SAFE	SAFE	SAFE	SAFE	SAFE	OUT		
4–6	Betty	SAFE	SAFE	SAFE	SAFE	SAFE	IMM	HIGH	SAFE	SAFE	LOW	SAFE	IMM	SAFE	OUT		
4–6	Nathalie	SAFE	SAFE	IMM	SAFE	SAFE	IMM	SAFE	SAFE	SAFE	LOW	SAFE	SAFE	SAFE	OUT		
7–8	Karlin	SAFE	SAFE	SAFE	SAFE	SAFE	SAFE	SAFE	LOW	SAFE	—N/a	—N/a	SAFE	OUT			
7–8	Nancy	SAFE	SAFE	IMM	LOW	SAFE	SAFE	SAFE	SAFE	LOW	SAFE	SAFE	SAFE	OUT			
9	Samantha	SAFE	SAFE	SAFE	SAFE	LOW	SAFE	SAFE	SAFE	LOW	LOW	OUT					
10	Anna	SAFE	SAFE	SAFE	SAFE	SAFE	SAFE	SAFE	SAFE	SAFE	SAFE	QUIT					
11	Sarah	SAFE	SAFE	SAFE	LOW	IMM	LOW	LOW	LOW	LOW	OUT						
12	Lisa G.	SAFE	SAFE	SAFE	SAFE	LOW	SAFE	SAFE	OUT								
13	Sainabou	SAFE	SAFE	IMM	SAFE	SAFE	SAFE	OUT									
14–15	Jana	SAFE	SAFE	LOW	SAFE	SAFE	OUT										
14–15	Simona	SAFE	SAFE	SAFE	SAFE	SAFE	OUT										
16	Antonia	SAFE	SAFE	IMM	SAFE	OUT											
17	Emma	SAFE	SAFE	LOW	OUT												
18	Laura K.	SAFE	SAFE	OUT													
19	Franziska	SAFE	OUT														
20–23	Fata	SAFE	QUIT														
20–23	Ina	SAFE	QUIT														
20–23	Laura H.	SAFE	QUIT														
20–23	Pauline	SAFE	QUIT														
24–25	Jill	OUT															
24–25	Lisa S.	OUT															

The contestant quit the competition
The contestant was immune from elimination
The contestant was in danger of elimination
The contestant was eliminated
The contestant won the competition

=== Photo shoot guide ===
- Episode 1 photo shoot: Black and White beauty shots in a pool
- Episode 2 photo shoot: Flora and fauna with snakes
- Episode 3 photo shoots: Sedcard; floating with balloons overlooking a roller coaster
- Episode 4 video shoot: Filming the opening sequence
- Episode 5 photo shoot: Posing in pairs on the beach with a male model
- Episode 6 photo shoots: Portraying both genders in pairs in B&W; posing with tarantulas in glitter body paint
- Episode 7 photo shoot: Hysterical divas in a restaurant
- Episode 8 photo shoots: Amerindian beauty; cowgirl fashion films
- Episode 9 photo shoot: Crying in 1920s fashion
- Episode 10 photo shoot: Jumping from a trampoline in colored gowns
- Episode 11 photo shoot: Hydrant sexy shoot
- Episode 12 photo shoot: Posing with little children
- Episode 13 photo shoot: Cosmopolitan covers
- Episode 14 photo shoot: Crashed sailing ship from Mars in couture
- Episode 15 photo shoot: Stage rock stars

== Controversy ==
An article on Bild.de revealed before the live finale that the final three as being Ivana Teklic, Stefanie Giesinger, and Jolina Fust.
