= KJM =

KJM can mean:

- the Kyoto Jazz Massive
- the German Commission for the Protection of Minors in the Media (German: Kommission für Jugendmedienschutz, KJM)
- Keyshawn, JWill & Max Show, an ESPN radio show and podcast
- Krishnarajapuram railway station, Karnataka, India (by Indian Railways station code)
