= Miranda DiGrande =

German model and actress (born 1997)

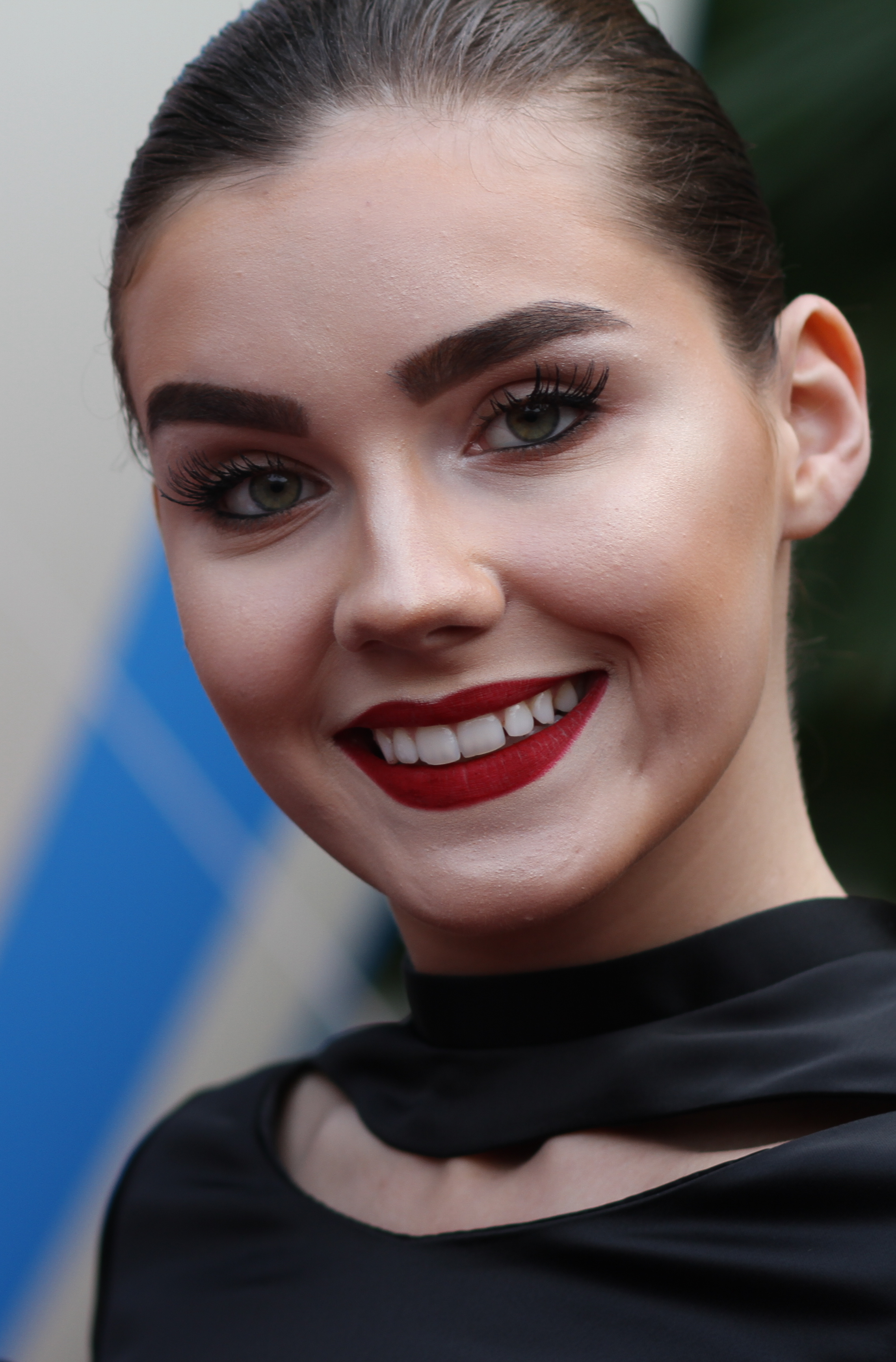
- Born: January 6, 1997 (age 29); Nienburg/Weser, Germany
- Occupations: Actress and model
- Years active: 2013–present

Miranda DiGrande (born Nathalie Volk) is a German model and actress. DiGrande became known through television appearances in the reality shows Germany's Next Top Model and Ich bin ein Star – Holt mich hier raus!.

== Biography ==
DiGrande was born on January 6, 1997, in Nienburg/Weser in Germany. She is the daughter of an entrepreneur and a mathematician from Moscow. She grew up in Nienburg/Weser with her elder brother.

In 2013, DiGrande took part in the 9th season of Germany's Next Top Model as a contestant and made it to the semi-finals. She has worked globally in Italy, France, Germany, Switzerland, India and South Korea. DiGrande later contested in the reality show Ich bin ein Star – Holt mich hier raus! in January 2016. She later appeared on other television shows such as Goodbye Deutschland, The Story of My Life on VOX and her own show Nathalies World on Hamburg 1.

In 2015, DiGrande met media entrepreneur Frank Otto and got engaged to him in March 2018. In the same year, she commenced her studies in method acting at the Lee Strasberg Theater and Film Institute in New York, USA.

She changed her name from Volk to DiGrande at the end of 2020. DiGrande is recognized as an activist who contributed to the German Ocean Foundation's research on coral bleaching. Additionally, she established her own foundation, the DiGrande Foundation, aimed at raising awareness for children in need.

In September 2023, she published her autobiography titled "In Meinen Eigenen Worten: Ein Tag Ohne Lügen" (In My Own Words: A Day Without Lies). She currently lives in Australia and is studying medicine.

== Television appearances ==
- Germany's Next Top Model (2016)
- I'm a Celebrity - Get Me Out of Here! (2016)
- The perfect celebrity dinner (2016)
- Nathalie's World (2016)
- Sat.1 breakfast television (2016)
- THIS! (2016)
- Goodbye Germany (2017)
- Story of My Life (2017)
- Markus Lanz (2017)
- 3after9 (2017)
- Man Gottschalk (2017)
- Night Café (2018, 2021)
