= Germany's Next Topmodel season 3 =

Germany's Next Topmodel
- Season 3
- Judges: Heidi Klum; Peyman Amin; Rolf Scheider
- No. of contestants: 19
- Winner: Jennifer Hof
- No. of episodes: 16

Release
- Original network: ProSieben
- Original release: 28 February – 5 June 2008

Season chronology
- ← Previous; Season 2 Next → Season 4

The third season of Germany's Next Topmodel aired on German television network ProSieben from 28 February to 5 June 2008, under the catch phrase "Sie laufen wieder" ("They walk again" – as in to walk the runway).

For this season the number of contestants was expanded to 19. However, this season started with 120 semi-finalists in the competition.

The winner of the show was 16-year-old Jennifer Hof from Rodgau. Her prizes include:

- A contract with IMG Models in Paris.
- A cover and spread in the German edition of Cosmopolitan.
- An advertising campaign for C&A worth €250,000.
- A Volkswagen Tiguan

The international destinations for this season were set in Barcelona, Vienna, Tel Aviv, Los Angeles, New York City and Sydney.

== Contestants ==
Ages stated are at start of contest.

Contestant	Age	Height	Hometown	Finish	Place
Rubina Radwanski	20	1.75 m (5 ft 9 in)	Frankfurt	Episode 3	19–17
Aisha Grone	16	1.69 m (5 ft 6 1/2 in)	Modautal	Episode 3	19–17
Sandra Korte	22	1.78 m (5 ft 10 in)	Leipzig	Episode 3	19–17
Aline Tausch	20	1.71 m (5 ft 7 1/2 in)	Munich	Episode 4	16–15
Tainá Santos Silva	18	1.73 m (5 ft 8 in)	Brühl	Episode 4	16–15
Elena Rotter	20	1.70 m (5 ft 7 in)	Salzburg, Austria	Episode 5	14
Katharina Harms	18	1.85 m (6 ft 1 in)	Bremen	Episode 6	13–12
Gina-Lisa Lohfink	21	1.69 m (5 ft 6 1/2 in)	Seligenstadt	Episode 6	13–12
Bianca Schumacher	20	1.73 m (5 ft 8 in)	Krefeld	Episode 7	11
Sophia Maus	19	1.79 m (5 ft 10 1/2 in)	Aachen	Episode 8	10
Anna Vanessa 'Vanessa' Hegelmaier	20	1.78 m (5 ft 10 in)	Bielefeld	Episode 10	9 (quit)
Sarah Knappik	21	1.78 m (5 ft 10 in)	Bochum	Episode 10	8
Raquel Alvarez	22	1.80 m (5 ft 11 in)	Bern, Switzerland	Episode 11	7
Gisele Oppermann	20	1.74 m (5 ft 8 1/2 in)	Braunschweig	Episode 12	6
Wanda Badwal	23	1.73 m (5 ft 8 in)	Hamburg	Episode 14	5–4
Carolin Ruppert	24	1.74 m (5 ft 8 1/2 in)	Kelkheim	Episode 14	5–4
Christina Leibold	21	1.75 m (5 ft 9 in)	Volkach	Episode 16	3
Janina Schmidt	23	1.77 m (5 ft 9 1/2 in)	Hamburg	Episode 16	2
Jennifer Hof	16	1.80 m (5 ft 11 in)	Rodgau	Episode 16	1

== Episode summaries ==
No. overall	No. in season	Title	Original release date
24	1	"Das große Casting in Köln"	28 February 2008
The competition began with 120 contestants from Germany, Austria, and Switzerland vying for the top model title. They showcased their runway skills and completed challenges, including a photo shoot and promotional tasks. The judges narrowed the field to 50, who then traveled to Barcelona for a runway show at the Bread & Butter festival. After some struggled on the catwalk, 30 girls advanced to the next round.: Featured photographer: Robertino Nicolic; Special guests: Boris Entrup & Philipp Plein
25	2	"Die Sedcard"	6 March 2008
Put on your favorite clothes and get in front of the camera! In the second episode, the 30 candidates style themselves for their personal comp card. But not all top model candidates demonstrate a sure hand when it comes to outfits.: Featured photographers: Oliver Schulze & Stephan Pick; Special guest: Petra Gessulat
26	3	"Erster Zoff im Modelhaus"	13 March 2008
The 19 finalists head to Austria for a helicopter-themed photo shoot, but first, they face consequences for leaving their hotel rooms in disarray, with some admitting to smoking indoors. The photo shoot proves challenging due to windy conditions, and Gisele struggles with her fear of helicopters. Back at the model house, tensions rise during a house meeting, with accusations and conflicts between the girls. On elimination day, the girls walk the runway with an egg on a spoon, and Katharina's comments about Tainá spark further drama, leading to another cliffhanger ending.: Booked for job: Vanessa Hegelmaier; Featured photographer & special guest: Kristian Schuller
27	4	"Haare ab"	20 March 2008
The episode begins with the elimination of Rubina, Aisha, and Sandra due to various reasons. The remaining contestants undergo makeovers, with Gina-Lisa and Wanda expressing their dissatisfaction. They then participate in a fashion challenge, where Gisele and Sarah emerge as winners. The girls also share personal stories, including experiences with bullying. Some contestants audition for a C&A commercial, with Janina landing the role. For the photo shoot, the girls pose in pairs, and Carolin and Jennifer are rewarded with business class tickets to New York City. Ultimately, Aline and Tainá are eliminated for not meeting expectations.: First eliminated: Aisha Grobe, Rubina Radwanski & Sandra Korte; Challenge winner: Gisele Oppermann & Sarah Knappik; Booked for job: Janina Schmidt; Second eliminated: Aline Tausch & Tainá Santos Silva; Featured photographer: Matt McCabe; Special guests: Berthold Steinle, Evelyn Hammerström, Helena Faccenda, Dr. Stefan Fredrich, & Thomas Krygier
28	5	"Willkommen in New York"	27 March 2008
The 14 contestants attend castings for New York Fashion Week, with Janina landing two jobs and Jennifer winning a promotional gig. The girls are tasked with voting for the four weakest among them, with Sarah, Gina-Lisa, Carolin, and Christina being named. At a photo shoot with exotic animals, Tessa refuses to participate due to animal treatment concerns, earning a warning. Ultimately, Elena is eliminated for failing to live up to her initial potential, while Tessa is given another chance. This week's photo shoot was inspired by the shoot for 1-800-Flowers on the episode "The Girl Who Suddenly Collapsed" from season 4 of America's Next Top Model.: Challenge winner: Christina Leibold & Wanda Badwal; Booked for job: Janina Schmidt (2x) & Jennifer Hof; Eliminated: Elena Rotter; Featured photographer: Oliver Gast; Special guests: Gunter Thiel, Hana Soukupová, Kristian Schuller, Mario Page, & Wichy Hassan
29	6	"Ganz verliebt am Strand"	3 April 2008
Now it's getting hot and sandy: During the photo shoot on the beach, the girls have to prove that they have fire in them. True passion should be ignited together with a male co-star. But one candidate takes the motto quite literally. This week's photo shoot was inspired by the beach shoot on the episode "The Girl Who Blames The Taxi Driver" from season 8 of America's Next Top Model.: Challenge winner: Raquel Alvarez, Sophia Maus & Vanessa Hegelmaier; Booked for job: Gisele Oppermann, Raquel Alvarez, Sophia Maus & Vanessa Hegelmaier; Eliminated: Katharina Harms; Featured photographer: Russell James; Special guests: Alek Wek, Heike Jarick, Marco Glaviano & Petra Gessulat
30	7	"Keine Zeit für Jetlag!"	10 April 2008
From New York we go straight back to Germany - but there is no respite for the candidates. The first casting is waiting right at the airport! In addition, the girls have to stand their ground during the shoot. This week's photo shoot was inspired by the gender swap shoot on the episode "The Girl Who Takes Credit" from season 8 of America's Next Top Model.: Booked for job: Christina Leibold, Janina Schmidt, Jennifer Hof (2x), Vanessa Hegelmaier, & Wanda Badwal; First eliminated: Gina-Lisa Lohfink; Second eliminated: Bianca Schumacher; Special guest: Yfke Sturm
31	8	"Vertical Catwalk"	17 April 2008
For the candidates, the goal is high: in the vertical catwalk they have to show that they can put on a perfect show despite unusual situations. Our girls also let a lot of their clothes go during the shoot. This week's photo shoot was inspired by the nude shoot on the episode "The Girl Who Marks Her Territory" from season 7 of America's Next Top Model.: Challenge winner: Vanessa Hegelmaier & Wanda Badwal; Booked for job: Carolin Ruppert, Gisele Oppermann, Janina Schmidt, Jennifer Hof, Sophia Maus, & Wanda Badwal; Eliminated: Sophia Maus; Featured photographer: Philippe Kerlo; Special guests: Bert Peulecke, Boris Entrup, Jochen Schweizer, Rankin, & Veronika Ziegaus
32	9	"Ab nach Down Under"	24 April 2008
After a long flight, the candidates finally arrived in Sydney—but Vanessa is missing. In addition to cockroaches in the apartment, a new points system is causing problems for the girls. In addition to surfing lessons, the models also have a shoot on the beach. This episode marks the first time that host Heidi Klum is not part of the judges panel.: Challenge winner: Raquel Alvarez; Booked for job: Carolin Ruppert, Christina Leibold, Gisele Oppermann, Janina Schmidt, Jennifer Hof, & Wanda Badwal, Eliminated: None
33	10	"Tanz mit den Aborigines"	1 May 2008
Sarah refers to a Bild article published on 11 April 2008 – 5 days before the broadcast. For the last week in Sydney, Heidi and company have come up with something very special: The girls should put on a fashion show in indigenous costume - including a dance performance. This week's reward photo shoot was shot on top of the Sydney Harbour Bridge as in "The Girl Who Blames The Taxi Driver" from season 8 of America's Next Top Model.: Quit: Vanessa Hegelmaier; Booked for job: Christina Leibold, Carolin Ruppert, Raquel Alvarez, & Sarah Knappik; Eliminated: Sarah Knappik; Special guest: Erika Eleniak
34	11	"Actiontraining, Diebestour und Tanzschritte"	8 May 2008
The contestants face a laser maze challenge, which Carolin wins, earning $10,000 worth of jewelry. They also undergo martial arts training and participate in a Kill Bill-themed commercial shoot for an energy drink. Raquel and Jennifer struggle, and ultimately, Raquel is eliminated due to her lack of potential compared to the other contestants.: Booked for job: Carolin Ruppert, Christina Leibold & Wanda Badwal; Eliminated: Raquel Alvarez; Featured director: Thomas Job; Special guest: Daniel Bernhardt
35	12	"Showgirls, Küsse und Dita von Teese"	15 May 2008
The contestants receive pin-up posing tips from Dita von Teese and participate in a Rio Carnival-themed photo shoot at the Orpheum Theatre. Christina wins a job filming a Gillette Venus Breeze commercial, while Jennifer suffers a minor foot injury at the house.: Eliminated: Gisele Oppermann; Featured photographer: Salem; Featured director: Ben Hartenstein; Special guests: Dita von Teese & Mike S. Dutz
36	13	"Ed Hardy, Fitness und ein schmackhaftes Shooting"	22 May 2008
The girls are taken out jogging in the Hollywood Hills with judge Peyman Amin. Later they do a food-themed photo shoot with photographer Kristian Schuller.: Eliminated: None; Featured photographer: Kristian Schuller; Special guest: Christian Audigier
37	14	"Cosmopolitan-Shooting, Angriff auf Peyman und die Final-Entscheidung"	29 May 2008
The contestants have a busy week in Los Angeles, with Christina shooting with Ed Hardy and Carolin winning a commercial shoot for a German telco provider. Wanda is eliminated due to lack of potential, leaving Christina and Jennifer in the competition. The episode ends with a cliffhanger as Janina and Carolin face the judges, setting up the season's finale.: Eliminated: Wanda Badwal; Featured director: Matthias Kopp; Special guest: Christian Audigier & Petra Gessulat
38	15	"Semi-Final"	3 June 2008
For the first time in Germany's Next Topmodel history two episodes are broadcast within one week. It's the question that has been bothering the candidates since the first show: Who will make it to the final? Two places are still open. There is also a large male casting with old acquaintances. This episode features the search for a male model.: Eliminated: Carolin Ruppert; Special guest: Petra Gessulat
39	16	"Das Finale"	5 June 2008
The season finale features all the contestants walking the runway, with a photo shoot involving spiders and pythons. Christina is eliminated, leaving Jennifer and Janina in the final two. After performances by Monrose and Seal, Jennifer is crowned the winner, beating out Janina.: Final three: Christina Leibold, Janina Schmidt & Jennifer Hof; Eliminated: Christina Leibold; Final two: Janina Schmidt & Jennifer Hof; Germany's Next Topmodel: Jennifer Hof; Featured photographer: Philippe Kerlo; Special guests: Monrose & Seal

== Summaries ==
=== Results table ===
Place	Model	Episodes													
Place	Model	3	4 (Note: In episode 4, Gisele and Sarah won the challenge and were granted immunity from elimination.)	5	6	7	8	9 (Note: In episode 9, Vanessa was sick was absent in this week's episode.)	10 (Note: In episode 10, Vanessa decided to quit the competition. Furthermore, Janina won the challenge and was granted immunity from elimination.)	11	12	13 (Note: Episode 13 was a non-elimination.)	14	16	
1	Jennifer	SAFE	IMM	SAFE	SAFE	SAFE	SAFE	SAFE	SAFE	LOW	SAFE	SAFE	SAFE	SAFE	WIN
2	Janina	SAFE	SAFE	SAFE	SAFE	SAFE	SAFE	SAFE	IMM	LOW	SAFE	SAFE	LOW	LOW	OUT
3	Christina	SAFE	SAFE	SAFE	SAFE	SAFE	LOW	SAFE	LOW	SAFE	SAFE	LOW	LOW	OUT	
4–5	Carolin	SAFE	IMM	SAFE	SAFE	SAFE	LOW	SAFE	SAFE	SAFE	LOW	LOW	OUT		
4–5	Wanda	SAFE	SAFE	SAFE	SAFE	SAFE	SAFE	LOW	SAFE	SAFE	SAFE	SAFE	OUT		
6	Gisele	SAFE	SAFE	SAFE	SAFE	SAFE	SAFE	SAFE	SAFE	SAFE	OUT				
7	Raquel	SAFE	SAFE	SAFE	SAFE	SAFE	SAFE	SAFE	SAFE	OUT					
8	Sarah	SAFE	SAFE	SAFE	LOW	SAFE	SAFE	LOW	OUT						
9	Vanessa	SAFE	SAFE	SAFE	SAFE	SAFE	SAFE		QUIT						
10	Sophia	SAFE	SAFE	SAFE	SAFE	SAFE	OUT								
11	Bianca	SAFE	SAFE	SAFE	SAFE	OUT									
12–13	Gina-Lisa	SAFE	SAFE	SAFE	OUT										
12–13	Katharina	SAFE	SAFE	SAFE	OUT										
14	Elena	SAFE	SAFE	OUT											
15–16	Aline	SAFE	OUT												
15–16	Tainá	SAFE	OUT												
17–19	Aisha	OUT													
17–19	Rubina	OUT													
17–19	Sandra	OUT													

The contestant was eliminated
The contestant was immune from elimination
The contestant was in danger of elimination
The contestant withdrew from the competition
The contestant won the competition

=== Photo shoot guide ===
- Episode 1 photo shoot: Emotions (casting)
- Episode 2 photo shoot: Sedcard (casting)
- Episode 3 photo shoot: Cobra
- Episode 4 photo shoot: Angels and demons
- Episode 5 photo shoot: Animal
- Episode 6 photo shoot: Beach love
- Episode 7 photo shoot: Drag queens
- Episode 8 photo shoot: Hair and nude
- Episode 9 photo shoot: Surf
- Episode 10 photo shoot: Baywatch
- Episode 11 photo shoot: Martial arts commercial
- Episode 12 photo shoot: Showgirls
- Episode 13 photo shoot: Five course meal
- Episode 14 photo shoot: Cosmopolitan covers

== Controversies ==
- Aline Tausch, who was eliminated in episode four, did a nude photo shoot for penthouse magazine. She was confronted with it by Heidi Klum during the show.
- Gisele Oppermann became known for her whiny voice and her bursting into tears permanently when being confronted with one of her many phobias such as her fear of cockroaches, butterflies ("lepidopterophobia") and elevators. She is the first contestant in the history of Germany's Next Topmodel to quit a photo shoot. (See Willkommen in New York.)
- On 15 May it was reported that Gisele Oppermann used to be a drug dealer in secondary school selling hashish to seventh graders, consuming drugs herself and eventually getting the boot. This happened to be the day of the broadcast of her elimination.
- On 12 April, a "secret list" was published on a fan forum which foresaw all the eliminations correctly. On 22 and 23 May tabloid newspaper Bild published two articles referencing to the list.
