= Germany's Next Topmodel season 2 =

Germany's Next Topmodel
- Season 2
- Judges: Heidi Klum; Peyman Amin; Bruce Darnell; Boris Entrup
- No. of contestants: 17
- Winner: Barbara Meier
- No. of episodes: 13

Release
- Original network: ProSieben
- Original release: 1 March – 31 May 2007

Season chronology
- ← Previous; Season 1 Next → Season 3

The second season of Germany's Next Topmodel aired on German television network ProSieben from 1 March 2007 to 31 May 2007.

The winner of the show was 20-year-old Barbara Meier from Amberg. Her prizes include:

- A contract with IMG Models in Paris.
- A contract with ProSiebenSat.1 Media
- A cover and spread in the German edition of Cosmopolitan.
- An advertising campaign for C&A worth €250,000.
- An Opel Tigra Twin Top

The international destinations for this season were set in St. Moritz, Cape Town, Bangkok and Los Angeles.

== Contestants ==
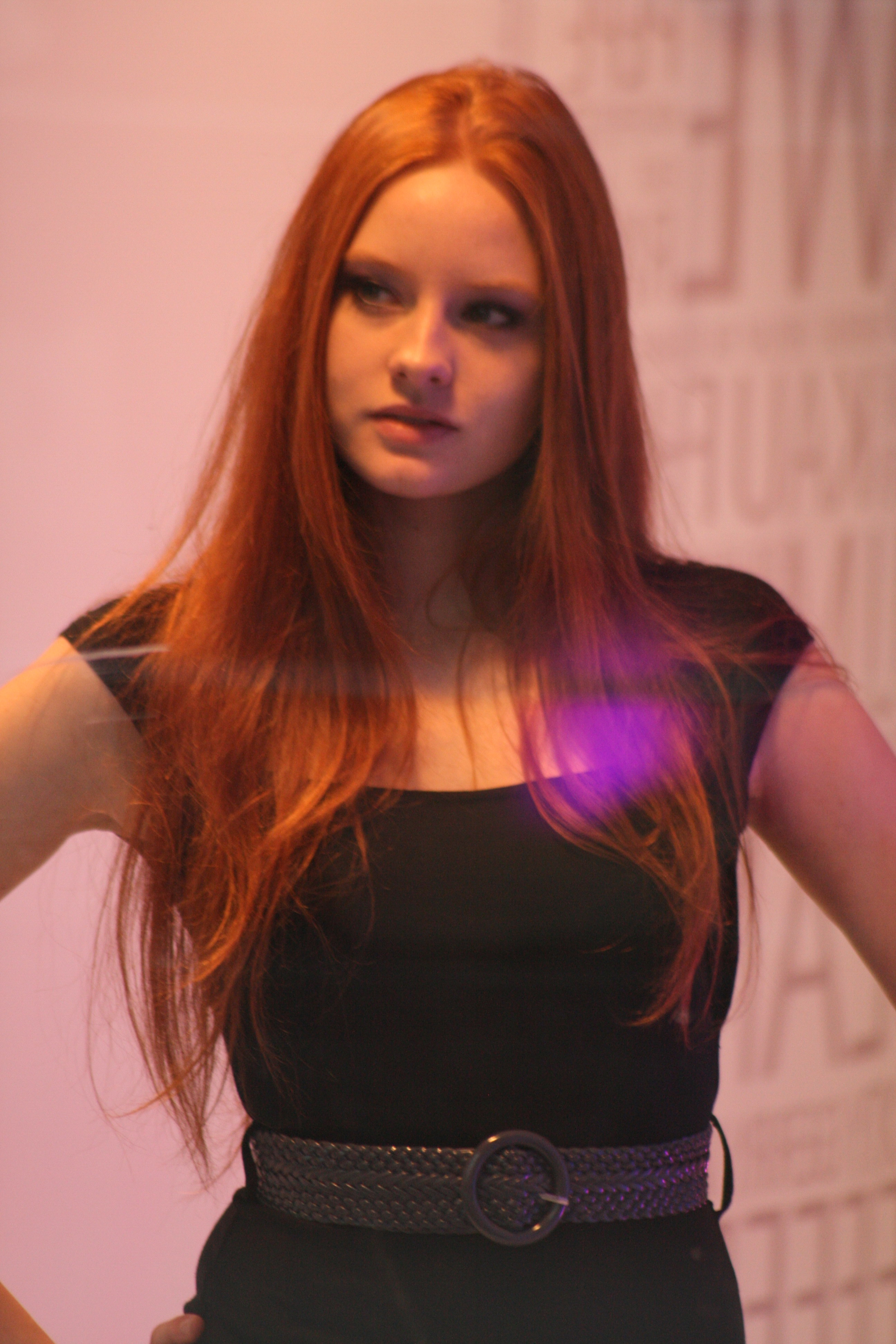
Barbara Meier, the winner of the season

(ages stated are at start of contest)

Contestant	Age	Height	Hometown	Outcome	Place
Sophie Dahl	17	1.76 m (5 ft 9 1/2 in)	Gammelsdorf	Episode 2	17-16 (quit)
Alina Maier	16	1.78 m (5 ft 10 in)	Munich	Episode 2	17-16 (quit)
Janine Mackenroth	18	1.73 m (5 ft 8 in)	Munich	Episode 2	15
Antje Pötke	22	1.80 m (5 ft 11 in)	Strausberg	Episode 3	14–13
Enyerlina Sanchez	25	1.83 m (6 ft 0 in)	San Juan, Dominican Republic	Episode 3	14–13
Janina Cüpper	21	1.75 m (5 ft 9 in)	Aachen	Episode 4	12
Alla Kosovan	18	1.77 m (5 ft 9 1/2 in)	Berlin	Episode 5	11
Denise Dahinten	19	1.72 m (5 ft 7 1/2 in)	Bruchköbel	Episode 6	10
Aneta Tobor	21	1.75 m (5 ft 9 in)	Castrop-Rauxel	Episode 7	9–8
Tonia Michaely	19	1.82 m (5 ft 11 1/2 in)	Berlin	Episode 7	9–8
Michaela 'Milla' von Krockow	20	1.75 m (5 ft 9 in)	Göttingen	Episode 8	7
Anja Platzer	19	1.83 m (6 ft 0 in)	St. Stefan, Austria	Episode 9	6
Mandy Graff	18	1.79 m (5 ft 10 1/2 in)	Kehlen, Luxembourg	Episode 11	5–4
Fiona Erdmann	18	1.74 m (5 ft 8 1/2 in)	Bremen	Episode 11	5–4
Hana Nitsche	21	1.72 m (5 ft 7 1/2 in)	Oftersheim	Episode 13	3
Anne-Kathrin 'Anni' Wendler	21	1.77 m (5 ft 9 1/2 in)	Schwerin	Episode 13	2
Barbara Meier	20	1.74 m (5 ft 8 1/2 in)	Amberg	Episode 13	1

== Episode summaries ==
No. overall	No. in season	Title	Original release date
11	1	"Welche 15 Mädchen werden es in die nächste Runde schaffen?"	1 March 2007
Out of over 16,000 applicants, the judges selected 100, who then had to prove themselves in model castings. The applicants were given two minutes to win over the judges with their charisma and personality. From the 100, 25 were chosen and given their first task: a fashion show at the Signal Iduna Park in Dortmund, Germany's largest football stadium, where they had to do a catwalk down the field during halftime in front of over 70,000 football fans watching the Borussia Dortmund vs. VfB Stuttgart game. At the end of the second day of casting, ten girls were eliminated, leaving just 15 in the running.
12	2	"Das erste große Einzel-Fotoshooting steht bevor"	8 March 2007
The 15 remaining contestants arrived in St. Moritz and participated in their first photo shoot on a snow-covered mountain for the German edition of Cosmopolitan. After this photo shoot, contestants Sophie and Alina chose to leave the show to pursue their education, and they were replaced by previously eliminated contestants Tonia and Denise. The contestants were then given their first challenge, which was won by Aneta. Finally, they took part in their first major photo shoot, posing in front of a gigantic fan with a car behind them. Janine was the first model eliminated due to a lack of expression in her photos.: Quit: Sophie Dahl and Alina Maier; Re-entered: Denise Dahinten & Tonia Michaely; Eliminated: Janine Mackenroth
13	3	"Einzug ins neue Zuhause"	15 March 2007
The remaining contestants moved into their new house. Bruce and Boris trained them in three styles of runway walk and makeup: sporty, young virgin, and sexy. Later, the contestants received publicity training with comedian Hugo Egon Balder; Barbara won the challenge and chose Janina to share her prize—a three-course dinner with Heidi at a hotel. For the photo shoot, the girls posed in Swarovski crystals and bald caps. Contestants Enyerlina and Antje were eliminated.: Eliminated: Antje Pötke & Enyerlina Sanchez
14	4	"Der neue Style"	22 March 2007
Germany's Next Top Model is not a show for the faint of heart. The girls now have to prove this during the makeover. Long hair becomes short and some even get extensions. But not everyone likes the change. The contestants were given new haircuts, and then forced to pass the "Falling Fairytales" photo shoot from season 6 of America's Next Top Model. Janina was eliminated.: Eliminated: Janina Cüpper
15	5	"Es wird eisig..."	29 March 2007
During a fashion show at Akademie Mode and Design, Alla and Anja were barred from walking the runway. Later, designers Johnny Talbot and Adrian Runhof chose Hana, Fiona, and Milla to present their prêt-à-porter fashion show in Paris. The contestants then participated in a photo shoot depicting the four seasons with male models, with Tonia, Denise, Mandy, and Barbara winning a reward for their performance. The episode's main photo shoot took place in a cold storage house with ice sculptures, where the contestants had to pose in mini skirts and dresses. After a live walk and posing challenge, Alla was eliminated.: Booked for job: Fiona Erdmann, Hana Nitsche & Milla von Krockow; Challenge winner: Barbara Meier, Denise Dahinten, Mandy Graff, & Tonia Michaely; Eliminated: Alla Kosovan; Featured photographers: Matt McCabe, Oliver S.; Special guests: Adrian Runhof, Fank Wilde Johnny Talbot, & Susanne Marx
16	6	"Knutsch die Kröte"	5 April 2007
The contestants went on a professional casting for a car advertisement in Cape Town, where Hana landed the job. Anni, having won a previous challenge, was chosen to star in a music video for Kim Frank's song "Zwei Sommer," and she selected Mandy, Milla, and Aneta to join her. Later, the contestants filmed a TV commercial for an online dating agency, where they dressed as fairy princesses and kissed a frog that was swapped with a fake one mid-shoot to avoid cruelty. Denise struggled with the shoot, appearing clumsy, and Judge Heidi Klum's observation led to her elimination at the end of the episode.: Booked for job: Hana Nitsche; Challenge winner: Anni Wendler; Eliminated: Denise Dahinten; Featured director: Andreas Kayales; Special guests: Kim Frank & Ursula Michelis
17	7	"Heiße Action"	12 April 2007
This week's photo shoot required the contestants to stay focused despite loud explosion noises in the background. As a reward for winning an acting challenge, Barbara was chosen to co-star with Heidi Klum in a McDonald's television commercial. Meanwhile, the contestants' parents surprised their daughters with a visit.: Booked for job: Barbara Meier; Challenge winner: Aneta Tobor, Anja Platzer, Anni Wendler, Barbara Meier, Fiona Erdmann, & Milla von Krockow; Eliminated: Aneta Tobor & Tonia Michely; Featured photographer: Mario Schmolka; Special guests: Caroline Nippert, Johann Stockhammer, & Sascha Lutzi
18	8	"Ein tierisch gutes Shooting"	19 April 2007
The seven contestants traveled to Bangkok for a casting with the Thai fashion label Fly Now, where five of them walked the runway in a shallow swimming pool, while Anja and Fiona were excluded by the designer. The contestants then traveled to Los Angeles for a photo shoot with an elephant and a nearly nude man. After the shoot, the judges eliminated Milla due to a lack of expression in her photos.: Eliminated: Milla von Krockow
19	9	"Topmodel trifft Superstar"	26 April 2007
In Los Angeles, the contestants faced a red-carpet challenge, where Anja won and was rewarded with a yacht trip alongside Mandy, while others took a fitness lesson. They then participated in a casting with designer Christian Audigier, with Hana, Mandy, and Barbara selected to walk the runway. The week's photo shoot had them posing as superheroes bound by ropes between house walls. After clashing with the judges, Anja was eliminated.: Challenge winner: Anja Platzer; Booked for job: Barbara Meier, Hana Nitsche, and Mandy Graff; Eliminated: Anja Platzer; Featured photographer: Antoine Verglas; Special guest: Christian Audigier
20	10	"Bodypainting am Malibu Beach"	3 May 2007
The contestants participated in a nude photo shoot on Malibu Beach, where they were covered only in body paint during a body-painting session. Runway coach Bruce Darnell then tasked the girls with finding pedestrians on Hollywood's Rodeo Drive to convince them to take part in a photo shoot imitating famous film posters. Anni stood out with her outstanding achievement and was rewarded with a helicopter ride. Due to the show's success, the producers decided to extend it by adding an extra episode, resulting in no eliminations this week.: Eliminated: None
21	11	"Das große Cosmopolitan-Shooting steht bevor"	10 May 2007
The five remaining contestants participated in a photo shoot at a villa in the Hollywood Hills, where they got to take revenge on judge Peyman Amin for his harsh critiques. However, the shoot was cut short due to a nearby bush fire. The contestants then had a photo shoot for a chance to be on the cover of Cosmopolitan magazine. This was followed by a mock press conference where they had to answer questions in English; Barbara was particularly nervous, worrying that she'd inadvertently say something to upset her boyfriend, but was relieved to learn afterward that the journalists were actors. At the final judging, the girls walked in both prêt-à-porter and haute couture outfits, and Fiona & Mandy were eliminated.: Eliminated: Fiona Erdmann & Mandy Graff; Special guest: Petra Gessulat
22	12	"Wiedersehen mit allen 15 Kandidatinnen"	17 May 2007
Hana, Barbara and Anni are in the finale of the second season of Germany's Next Top Model. Shortly before the end, our three finalists have to give their all again and demonstrate their own creativity during the shoot. Now it's time to hold on!
23	13	"Das Finale"	24 May 2007
The finale, though described as "live," was pre-recorded. The three finalists, Anni, Barbara, and Hana, faced two catwalk challenges and presented their previous photos to the judges, resulting in Hana's elimination. Meanwhile, Bruce Darnell did photo shoots with Anni and Barbara. The episode featured a runway show with all contestants in baroque-themed clothing, accompanied by an opera version of "Ave Maria" and a guest appearance by the band Monrose. In the end, Barbara was crowned the winner after a final runway walk.: Final three: Anni Wendler, Barbara Meier & Hana Nitsche; Eliminated: Hana Nitsche; Final two: Anni Wendler and Barbara Meier; Germany's Next Topmodel: Barbara Meier
24	14	"Was keiner sah"	31 May 2007
What no one saw: Today there are previously unpublished pictures from the second season. This episode consisted largely of a summary of shown footage.

== Summaries ==
=== Results table ===
Place	Model	Episodes											
Place	Model	2 (Note: In episode 2, Alina and Sophie decided to quit the competition. They were replaced by Tonia and Denise.)	3	4	5	6	7	8	9	10 (Note: Episode 10 was a non-elimination.)	11	13	
1	Barbara	SAFE	SAFE	SAFE	SAFE	SAFE	SAFE	LOW	SAFE	SAFE	SAFE	SAFE	WIN
2	Anni	SAFE	SAFE	LOW	HIGH	SAFE	LOW	SAFE	SAFE	LOW	LOW	LOW	OUT
3	Hana	SAFE	SAFE	SAFE	SAFE	SAFE	SAFE	SAFE	SAFE	SAFE	SAFE	OUT	
4–5	Fiona	SAFE	SAFE	SAFE	SAFE	SAFE	SAFE	SAFE	SAFE	SAFE	OUT		
4–5	Mandy	SAFE	SAFE	SAFE	SAFE	SAFE	SAFE	SAFE	LOW	LOW	OUT		
6	Anja	SAFE	SAFE	SAFE	SAFE	SAFE	SAFE	SAFE	OUT				
7	Milla	SAFE	SAFE	SAFE	SAFE	SAFE	LOW	OUT					
8–9	Aneta	SAFE	SAFE	SAFE	SAFE	SAFE	OUT						
8–9	Tonia	SAFE	SAFE	SAFE	HIGH	SAFE	OUT						
10	Denise	SAFE	SAFE	SAFE	LOW	OUT							
11	Alla	SAFE	SAFE	LOW	OUT								
12	Janina	SAFE	SAFE	OUT									
13–14	Antje	SAFE	OUT										
13–14	Enyerlina	SAFE	OUT										
15	Janine	OUT											
16–17	Alina	QUIT											
16–17	Sophie	QUIT											

The contestant withdrew from the competition
The contestant was in danger of elimination
The contestant was eliminated
The contestant was one of the best performers of the week, and was declared safe before the elimination ceremony
The contestant won the competition

=== Photo shoot guide ===
- Episode 2 photo shoot: Wind tunnel
- Episode 3 photo shoot: Bald heads
- Episode 4 photo shoot: Falling fairy tale characters
- Episode 5 photo shoot: Posing on ice blocks
- Episode 6 photo shoot: Advertising spot
- Episode 7 photo shoot: Action and explosion
- Episode 8 photo shoot: Wildlife with Tarzan
- Episode 9 photo shoot: Superheroes
- Episode 10 photo shoot: Body painting
- Episode 11 photo shoots: "We hate peyman"; Cosmopolitan Germany Cover
- Episode 12 photo shoot: Contestants' choice
- Episode 13 photo shoots: Romeo and Juliet; caught in the act

== Controversies ==
Many fans were able to find out the eliminated contestant from the next week's episode beforehand.

- Eyerlina Sanchez had entered in Miss Dominican Republic 2002.
- Denise Dahinten's elimination was confirmed by studio guests of that day's episode of late night show TV total, where the eliminated contestants appeared after their elimination.
- Host channel ProSieben booked a web domain for each contestant's name, e.g. www.fiona-erdmann.de – the only names that were not booked were Tonia Michaely, Aneta Tobor, and Michaela "Milla" Gräfin von Krockow, so their elimination was indirectly confirmed.
- An Austrian newspaper published a report on Anja Platzer being home again, confirming her elimination the next week.
- Mandy's friends divulged her elimination in several internet forums.
- As the 11th episode ended with a cliffhanger, making it ambiguous whether Fiona Erdmann or Anni Wendler would be one of the final three, fans began to collect details that would reveal the last finalist. Some television guides accidentally published photos of Wendler, Barbara Meier, and Hana Nitsche. Paparazzi photos of the three were shot and leaked into the internet. Finally, in the 11th episode, judges Heidi Klum and Peyman Amin could be heard stating "those three really deserve to get into the final show". When these words were said, there was a brief visual of three photos separated from two others. The two put aside were those of Erdmann and Mandy Graff.
