= Germany's Next Topmodel season 1 =

Germany's Next Topmodel
- Season 1
- Judges: Heidi Klum; Peyman Amin; Bruce Darnell; Armin Morbach
- No. of contestants: 12
- Winner: Lena Gercke
- No. of episodes: 10

Release
- Original network: ProSieben
- Original release: 25 January – 29 March 2006

Season chronology
- Next → Season 2

The first season of Germany's Next Topmodel aired on German television network ProSieben from 25 January 2006 to 29 March 2006.

This was the only season to feature a cast of only twelve contestants. All later cycles have featured at least twenty-six contestants.

The first season copied many photo shoot ideas from America's Next Top Model, especially from the first season. It has also gone with almost three episodes with a double-elimination for the models.

The winner of the show was 17-year-old Lena Gercke from Cloppenburg. Her prizes include:

- A contract with IMG Models in Paris.
- A contract with ProSiebenSat.1 Media
- A cover and spread in the German edition of Cosmopolitan.
- An advertising campaign for Windows Live and OuiSet
- An Lancia Ypsilon

The international destinations for this season were New York City, Los Angeles and Paris.

== Contestants ==
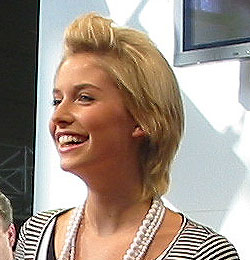
Lena Gercke, the winner of the season

Ages stated are at start of contest.

Contestant	Age	Height	Hometown	Finish	Place
Andrea Lichtenberg	19	1.78 m (5 ft 10 in)	Bergisch Gladbach	Episode 2	12–11
Anne Mühlmeier	17	1.75 m (5 ft 9 in)	Stuttgart	Episode 2	12–11
Céline Roscheck	22	1.82 m (5 ft 11 1/2 in)	Vienna, Austria	Episode 3	10 (quit)
Rahel Krüger	20	1.70 m (5 ft 7 in)	Kiel	Episode 3	9
Micaela Schäfer	22	1.75 m (5 ft 9 in)	Berlin	Episode 4	8
Luise Mikulla	16	1.71 m (5 ft 7 1/2 in)	Potsdam	Episode 5	7
Charlotte Offeney	18	1.83 m (6 ft 0 in)	Hanover	Episode 6	6–5
Lena Meier	19	1.80 m (5 ft 11 in)	Nuremberg	Episode 6	6–5
Janina Ortmann	20	1.73 m (5 ft 8 in)	Corfu, Greece	Episode 8	4
Jennifer Wanderer	17	1.78 m (5 ft 10 in)	Kulmbach	Episode 10	3
Yvonne Schröder	17	1.74 m (5 ft 8 1/2 in)	Frankfurt	Episode 10	2
Lena Gercke	17	1.78 m (5 ft 10 in)	Cloppenburg	Episode 10	1

== Episode summaries ==
No. overall	No. in season	Title	Original release date
1	1	"Der Sprung ins kalte Wasser"	January 25, 2006
From over 11,000 applicants, 32 girls were selected for the competition, where they faced challenges, including creating outfits from packed clothes and walking for an audience of miners at a coal mine in Duisburg. After eliminations, 12 finalists were chosen to proceed to New York City.
2	2	"New York"	February 1, 2006
In New York City, the contestants faced their first challenges, including a runway lesson atop a skyscraper with Bruce and a meeting with Heidi and Victoria's Secret models like Tyra Banks and Gisele Bündchen. They then had a photo shoot on a rooftop in lingerie. For their first challenge, each girl was given $100 to buy an outfit, with Jennifer chosen as the winner, who then shared her prize of watching the Victoria's Secret show with Luise. At the first elimination, Andrea and Anne were sent home.: Eliminated: Andrea Lichtenberg & Anne Mühlmeier; Featured photographer: Russell James; Special guests: Gisele Bündchen & Tyra Banks
3	3	"Trau dich"	February 8, 2006
The contestants returned to Germany and had to adjust to their new living arrangements. They received makeovers at a hair salon, with some, like Lena G., getting drastic cuts, while others, like Janina, refused the proposed style. Céline left the competition for personal reasons without getting a makeover. The girls then had a runway lesson and a photo shoot themed around iconic 1930s and 1940s styles, posing with spiders and snakes. At elimination, Rahel was sent home after landing in the bottom two with Micaela.: Quit: Céline Roscheck; Bottom two: Micaela Schäfer & Rahel Krüger; Eliminated: Rahel Krüger; Featured photographer: Joachim Baldauf; Special guest: Seal
4	4	"Zwischen den Welten"	February 15, 2006
The remaining eight contestants participated in a challenge where they modeled at a subway station in Düsseldorf, walking on a platform for passengers. Lena and Charlotte excelled and were rewarded with an invitation to the "Night of the Proms" in Rotterdam, where they met Seal. The other contestants spent the evening at the loft. The next day, the girls had a fake press training, where they were interviewed and asked private questions, later revealed to be a test. For the photo shoot, the girls had beauty shots taken with different facial expressions. At elimination, the girls were shown their photos with and without retouching, and Micaela was eliminated due to her lack of personality and inability to convince in different modeling styles.: Eliminated: Micaela Schaefer; Featured photographer: Antoine Verglas; Special guest: Seal
5	5	"Und Bitte!"	February 22, 2006
The contestants underwent acting training, acting out a love/fight scene with an actor, and then participated in a challenging photo shoot where they posed underwater in evening gowns. Luise felt unwell during the shoot. Janina made a drastic decision to cut her hair short, but was devastated by the result. The girls then had a karaoke party with Heidi and later walked on the runway with raw eggs taped to their bare feet. At elimination, Luise was sent home, with the judges feeling she wasn't ready for the demands of being a top model.: Eliminated: Luise Mikulla; Special guest: Erol Sander
6	6	"Sexy Moves"	March 1, 2006
The contestants underwent dance training and a go-see at Escada, where Lena G. and Janina excelled and were rewarded with a trip to Paris. Meanwhile, the other girls participated in a rock-star style photo shoot, with Jennifer delivering a strong performance despite health issues, while Charlotte struggled to present herself in a sexy way. At elimination, Lena M. and Charlotte were sent home, with Bruce visibly emotional about losing his favorite contestant, Lena M.: Eliminated: Lena Meier & Charlotte Offeney; Special guest: Brian Rennie
7	7	"Bodypainting"	March 8, 2006
The contestants faced a hectic runway challenge at a shopping mall, followed by a body painting shoot with artist Joanne Gair, where they had to pose naked with animal print body paint. Lena initially hesitated due to discomfort with nudity but eventually agreed to participate. Despite challenges, including Jennifer's physical discomfort during the shoot, all four girls impressed the judges, resulting in a rare decision to keep all contestants in the competition without eliminating anyone.: Eliminated: None; Featured photographer: Joanne Gair; Special guest: Marcus Schenkenberg
8	8	"Sunny California"	March 15, 2006
Left to right: the last four participants at the CeBIT 2006: Yvonne Schröder, Janina Ortmann, Jennifer Wanderer and Lena Gercke The contestants traveled to Los Angeles, where they participated in challenges, including persuading strangers to get makeovers, runway training on the Santa Monica Pier, and a photo shoot jumping on a trampoline in bikinis. The final runway show tested their versatility in different styles, and after a thorough evaluation, Janina was eliminated, with the judges feeling the other girls had more potential.: Eliminated: Janina Ortmann; Featured photographer: Arthur Elgort; Special guest: Giuseppe Franco
9	9	"Paris wir kommen!"	March 22, 2006
The contestants faced multiple challenges in Los Angeles, including a casting, a runway show for YMI Jeans, and a photo shoot for Ed Hardy. They also had a fun day out with Heidi at the Santa Monica Pier. Later, they traveled to Paris for a casting with designer John Ribbe, where they competed with professional models, and ultimately, one would be crowned Germany's Next Topmodel.: Booked for job: Jennifer Wanderer, Lena Gercke, & Yvonne Schröder; Eliminated: None; Featured photographer: Pavel Havlicek; Special guest: Petra Gessulat & John Ribbe; Featured client: Paris Fashion Week
10	10	"Das Finale"	March 29, 2006
In the final, Jennifer is eliminated first due to her performance on the casting for Paris Fashion Week. This leaves Lena and Yvonne. In the end Lena is declared the winner. She eventually went on to become a successful model and the host of Austria's Next Topmodel.: Final three: Jennifer Wanderer, Lena Gercke, & Yvonne Schröder; Eliminated: Jennifer Wanderer; Final two: Yvonne Schröder & Lena Gercke; Germany's Next Topmodel: Lena Gercke; Featured photographer: Pavel Havlicek; Special guest: Petra Gessulat & John Ribbe

== Summaries ==
=== Results table ===
Place	Model	Episodes										
Place	Model	1	2	3 (Note: In episode 3, Céline decided to quit the competition.)	4	5	6	7 (Note: Episode 7 was a non-elimination.)	8	9	10	
1	Lena G.	SAFE	SAFE	SAFE	SAFE	SAFE	SAFE	SAFE	SAFE	SAFE	LOW	WIN
2	Yvonne	SAFE	SAFE	SAFE	SAFE	SAFE	SAFE	SAFE	SAFE	SAFE	SAFE	OUT
3	Jennifer	SAFE	SAFE	SAFE	SAFE	SAFE	SAFE	SAFE	SAFE	SAFE	OUT	
4	Janina	SAFE	SAFE	SAFE	SAFE	SAFE	SAFE	SAFE	OUT			
5-6	Lena M.	SAFE	SAFE	SAFE	SAFE	SAFE	OUT					
5-6	Charlotte	SAFE	SAFE	SAFE	SAFE	SAFE	OUT					
7	Luise	SAFE	SAFE	SAFE	SAFE	OUT						
8	Micaela	SAFE	SAFE	LOW	OUT							
9	Rahel	SAFE	SAFE	OUT								
10	Céline	SAFE	SAFE	QUIT								
11-12	Anne	SAFE	OUT									
11-12	Andrea	SAFE	OUT									

The contestant was in danger of elimination
The contestant was eliminated
The contestant withdrew from the competition
The contestant won the competition

=== Photo shoot guide ===
- Episode 2 photo shoot: Lingerie
- Episode 3 photo shoot: Wildlife
- Episode 4 photo shoot: Natural Beauty
- Episode 5 photo shoot: Underwater
- Episode 6 photo shoot: Musical
- Episode 7 photo shoot: Body Painting
- Episode 8 photo shoot: Trampoline
- Episode 9 photo shoots: Biker; Cosmopolitan cover
- Episode 10 photo shoot: Emotions
