= Jennifer Hof =

German fashion model

- Born: Jennifer Karin-Luise Hof; 15 May 1991 (age 35); Rodgau, Hesse, Germany
- Years active: 2008-2014, 2025
- Children: 3
- Modeling information
- Height: 1.81 m (5 ft 11 in)
- Hair color: Brown
- Eye color: Green
- Agency: IMG Models
- Website: www.jenny-k-l.com

Jennifer Karin-Luise Hof (born 15 May 1991) is a German fashion model and winner of the third cycle of Germany's Next Topmodel.

== Biography ==
Hof lives in the Hessian town of Rodgau, Germany, where she attended a Realschule. She graduated during her participation of the show.

In the last episode, with her trademark being her 113 cm long legs, she outpaced the other two finalists, Janina Schmidt and Christina Leibold, and was declared winner of the title "Germany's Next Topmodel". The prize included a contract with the modelling agency IMG Models in Paris, an appearance on the cover of the German edition of Cosmopolitan in August 2008, her own perfume brand, "Jenny K.L." and a contract as the face of the next advertising campaign for the clothing company C&A.

Hof is previous took time off from modeling to complete her Abitur studies at the Dreieichschule in Langen.

2017 it was reported that Hof was living from social benefits.

== Career ==
Hof achieved the middle maturity parallel to Germany's Next Topmodel. Rumors that she had already won the casting season in the Castinghow's third season, she had consistently denied. After her victory, she was seen at the Fashionshows of Talbot Runhof, Phillip Plein, Marcel Ostertag and Perret Schaad.

== Life ==
In February 2014, she announced that her model career had ended and that she trained as a tax expert. The fashion industry was "simply superficial," so she decided to "live a normal life with my family." She now has three children.

Preceded by Barbara Meier	Germany's Next Topmodel winner Cycle 3 (2008)	Succeeded by Sara Nuru
