= Zana Ramadani =

German politician and activist (born 1984)

- Born: 10 January 1984 (age 42); Skopje, Yugoslavia (Now North Macedonia)
- Known for: Die verschleierte Gefahr: Die Macht der muslimischen Mütter und der Toleranzwahn der Deutschen (2017)

Zana Ramadani (born 1984) is a German politician, feminist activist, and author of Albanian descent. She was born in Skopje, but fled to West Germany as a child. She was chair of the Junge Union, the youth organization of the CDU (Conservative Party), in Wilnsdorf in Central Germany.

She came to prominence when she founded the German branch of the feminist protest group FEMEN in 2012, and was involved in a number of topless protests against sexual exploitation. One high-profile protest involved invading the stage of Heidi Klum's television casting show Germany's Next Topmodel during the finale of cycle 8 sporting the slogan "Heidi horror picture show" as a critique of the beauty ideal propagated by the fashion industry. In another, the group appeared on the street in Hamburg's red-light district (the Reeperbahn), with Ramadani wearing the slogan "Destroy the Sex Industry!".

Ramadani's book Die verschleierte Gefahr: Die Macht der muslimischen Mütter und der Toleranzwahn der Deutschen was published in March 2017. It critiques Islam and the role of Muslim mothers.

According to a Süddeutsche Zeitung interview in April 2017, she frequently receives death threats from conservative Muslims, and after she was pregnant, the Muslim threats also included beating her to cause a miscarriage. As police would not give her protection, she applied for a firearms license.
