= Fiona Erdmann =

German model

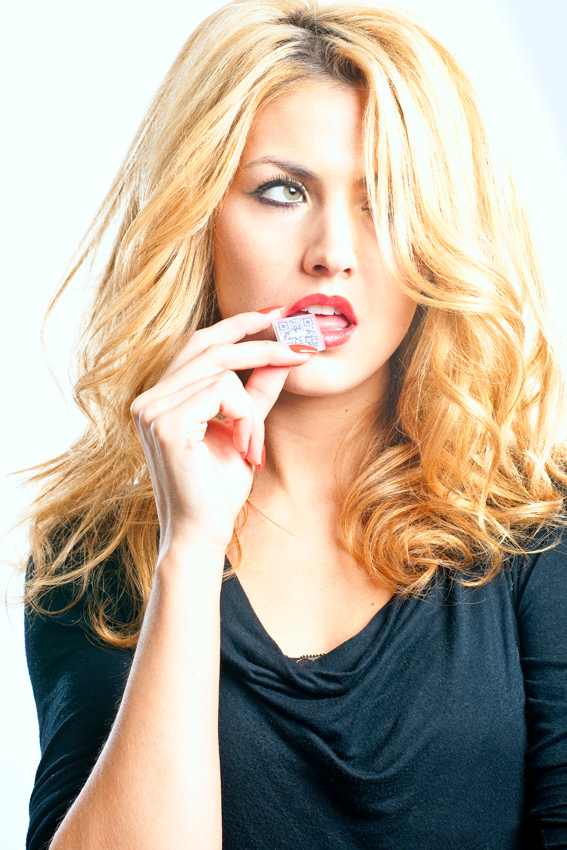
- Erdmann in 2012
- Born: 9 September 1988 (age 38); Saarbrücken-Dudweiler, West Germany
- Spouse: Mohamed O. (2010-2015)
- Partner(s): Mohamed O. (2004-2010); Mohammed (since 2017)
- Children: 3
- Modelling information
- Height: 1.74 m (5 ft 9 in)
- Hair colour: Auburn
- Eye colour: Green
- Website: fionaerdmann.tv

Fiona Erdmann (born 9 September 1988) is a German model and reality television contestant.

She finished in fourth place on the second cycle of Germany's Next Topmodel. She studied design and product design prior to being cast on the programme. She was the cover model for the May 2008 issue of Playboy in Germany, was featured in FHM Germany and shot for SKODA. She has been signed with Divina Model Management, Ice Models, MGM Models and Max Models. She was featured in a commercial for Axe and for German clothing line Jungstil. She has walked for designers such as Patrick Mohr, Sebastian Ellrich and Irene Luft, and also walked in Mercedes Fashion Week.
