= Thomas Hayo =

German creative director

Thomas Hayo (born 1969 in Neunkirchen, Saarland) is a German creative director. He has worked with models such as Gisele Bündchen, Naomi Campbell, Toni Garrn, Doutzen Kroes and Alessandra Ambrosio.

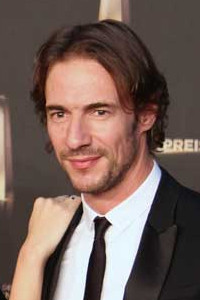
Thomas Hayo in 2012.

== Life ==
Thomas was born and raised in Germany, where he studied visual communications (Graphic design, film and photography) at the Academy of Arts in Darmstadt, before starting his advertising career at Springer & Jacoby in Hamburg, where he worked on multiple accounts including Mercedes-Benz.

In 1993 he moved to New York City and soon became one of the youngest Associate Creative Directors at J. Walter Thompson looking after accounts such as Kodak, Clairol, Rolex, De Beers, Pepsi-Lotion, The Wall Street Journal and Warner-Lambert International.

In 1999 he joined Bartle Bogle Hegarty, one of the most recognized creative agencies in the world, to help establishing their New York office.

During this time this office grew from 10 to 200 people while billings rose from 30 to, now, 600 million. Along the way he has been Creative Director on a wide variety of clients including Reebok, Sony-Ericsson, Axe, Dyson and Johnnie Walker. In addition to that, he was in charge of the entire Levi's account.

His creative responsibilities covered the entire spectrum of the marketing mix, from TV/Cinema commercials, print and outdoor, guerrilla and direct marketing, in-store, corporate design to all interactive and new media.

His work has been recognized by national and international award shows, including The Art Directors Club, The One Show, D&AD, The International Andy Awards, The International Clio Awards, Communication Arts as well as the International Advertising Festival in Cannes, where he has received multiple gold as well as silver and bronze lions. His work is also part of the Permanent Collection of the Museum of Modern Art in New York City.

Furthermore, he has continuously produced award.winning work on many public service accounts throughout his career such as The American Red Cross, Child-Hunger, SUV Safety Council and the Partnership for a Drug Free America, for which he has been personally recognized by former President Bill Clinton.

He has worked with some of the most respected directors such as Frank Budgen, Joe Pytka, Ivan Zacharias, David Fincher, Michel Gondry and some of the highest regarded photographers such as Richard Avedon, Nick Knight, Solve Sundsbo, Glenn Luchford, Nadav Kander and James Nachtwey, as well as numerous musical artists ranging from The Chemical Brothers to the London Symphony Orchestra.

During the last two years he has worked as a freelance Creative Director on the most diverse projects, from re-launching Justin Timberlake's clothing line „William Rast" to co-creating and directing a part of the Sundance Film Festival „New Frontiers" program. „New Frontiers" is the art part of the festival that focuses on new ways marrying the art of the moving image and storytelling with other art forms ad to propel both into the future.

Amongst many other projects, he is currently working as a Creative Director and Creative Consultant for the Japanese Clothing brand Uniqlo, for whom he has been overseeing various national and international campaigns as well as consulting on global strategies.

Since March 2011, Thomas Hayo is performing as one of the judges on the popular TV Show "Germany's Next Topmodel" by Heidi Klum. More than 2.2 million viewers watch him every week and follow how he helps Heidi Klum to look for the next Topmodel. Through his longtime experience and knowledge in the fashion business, he is able to give the upcoming models good advice about the future in modeling. He also began to write a monthly fashion blog for the German magazine „Gala" where he reports about fashion and interesting facts about his journeys to the several different cities which he gets to visit surfing the shooting for „Germany's Next Topmodel".
