= Commission for the Protection of Minors in the Media =

German state organisation regulating the exposure of children to mass media

Coordinates: 52.510627°N 13.390104°E

- Kommission für Jugendmedienschutz (KJM)
- Formation: 1 April 2003; 22 years ago
- Headquarters: Berlin, Germany
- Website: kjm-online.de

The Commission for the Protection of Minors in the Media (German: Kommission für Jugendmedienschutz, KJM) is a German state organisation that is intended to regulate the exposure of children to mass media. It is responsible for promoting compliance with the State Treaty on Youth Media Protection (German: Jugendmedienschutz-Staatsvertrag).

In February 2018 it commissioned research into loot boxes in video games, but concluded in March 2018 that loot boxes did not at that time constitute a specific threat to children.

In 2021, the organisation stated that it intended to block several Internet pornography websites for failing to implement age verification for access to their content.

== See also ==
- Protection of Young Persons Act (Germany)
- Federal Department for Media Harmful to Young Persons
