= Germany's Next Topmodel season 20 =

Model contest on television

Germany's Next Topmodel
- Season 20
- Judges: Heidi Klum
- No. of contestants: 51
- Winners: Daniela Djokić; Moritz Rüdiger
- No. of episodes: 25

Release
- Original network: ProSieben; Joyn
- Original release: 13 February – 19 June 2025

Season chronology
- ← Previous; Season 19 Next → Season 21

The twentieth season of Germany's Next Topmodel aired on German television network ProSieben from 13 February to 19 June 2025, under the catch phrase Happy Birthday GNTM.

The first twelve episodes aired twice a week, with men's episodes on Wednesdays and women's on Thursdays, until the groups merged on 27 March, marking the first co-ed Top Model season to initially begin with a separate competition for men and women.This season also marks the return of best-ager models for the first time since season 18. This is also the latest season to have a live finale shot in Cologne.

The winners of this season are 20-year-old Daniela Djokić from Ostfildern and 19-year-old Moritz Rüdiger from Berlin. Their prizes include:

- A joint cover and spread in the German edition of Harper's Bazaar.
- A cash prize worth €100,000 each.
- An advertising campaign for L'Oréal.

The international destinations for this season was set in Los Angeles. On the 7 January 2025 it was announced that due to the 2025 Southern California wildfires, filming of the second portion of the show was grounded to a halt. The filming resumed by the end of January.

== Contestants ==
Ages stated are as of the beginning of the contest

Contestant	Age	Height	Hometown	Finish	Place
Angelina Matic	20	—N/a	Kempten	Episode 5	48-44
Marlene Erdmann Sánchez	22	1.76 m (5 ft 9 1/2 in)	Mannheim	Episode 5	48-44
Leila Charifa Kraus	22	1.65 m (5 ft 5 in)	Zirndorf	Episode 5	48-44
Marie Schöner	21	—N/a	Ehrenkirchen	Episode 5	48-44
Jessica Lüdi	21	—N/a	Beckenried, Switzerland	Episode 5	48-44
Konstantin Bell	22	1.94 m (6 ft 4 1/2 in)	Tuttlingen	Episode 6	43-41
Enis Spahija	23	—N/a	Schweinfurt	Episode 6	43-41
Julian Johannes 'J.J.' Stocks	34	1.87 m (6 ft 1 1/2 in)	Cologne	Episode 6	43-41
Natali Czesak	20	—N/a	Frankfurt	Episode 7	40-37
Lucia Doric	21	—N/a	Hannover	Episode 7	40-37
Valeria Hoffmann	21	1.78 m (5 ft 10 in)	Oldenburg	Episode 7	40-37
Stella Miljenovic	23	1.77 m (5 ft 9 1/2 in)	Berlin	Episode 7	40-37
Felix Flad	27	1.90 m (6 ft 3 in)	Stuttgart	Episode 8	36-34
Christian Preinig	23	—N/a	Sankt Kanzian am Klopeiner See, Austria	Episode 8	36-34
Gabriel Moreno von Schinckel	23	1.91 m (6 ft 3 in)	Zurich, Switzerland	Episode 8	36-34
Jule-Malin 'Jule' Gscheidle	21	1.78 m (5 ft 10 in)	Frickenhausen	Episode 9	33
Jonathan Tolno (Note: Jonathan and Josy are brother and sister; however, they competed individually.)	24	1.86 m (6 ft 1 in)	Olching	Episode 10	32-30
Felix Schiller (Note: Felix S. previously competed in the seventh season of Austria's Next Topmodel, where he placed nineteenth.)	29	1.86 m (6 ft 1 in)	Vienna, Austria	Episode 10	32-30
Ryan Wöhrl	22	1.88 m (6 ft 2 in)	Landshut	Episode 10	32-30
Safia Asare	24	1.76 m (5 ft 9 1/2 in)	Dortmund	Episode 11	29 (quit)
Laura Klingert	25	1.70 m (5 ft 7 in)	Holzkirchen	Episode 11	28
Tim Schröder	19	—N/a	Berlin	Episode 12	27-25
Matthias ‘Mattes‘ Hafermann	38	1.87 m (6 ft 1 1/2 in)	Alpen	Episode 12	27-25
Lian Hansen	21	1.86 m (6 ft 1 in)	Bern, Switzerland	Episode 12	27-25
Alexander Van Hove	24	1.89 m (6 ft 2 1/2 in)	Landshut	Episode 13	24-23
Luisa 'Lulu' Gömann (Note: Katrin and Lulu are mother and daughter; however, they competed individually.)	32	1.79 m (5 ft 10 1/2 in)	Berlin	Episode 13	24-23
Katrin Gömann-Elsner	56	1.82 m (5 ft 11 1/2 in)	Berlin	Episode 13	22 (quit)
Annett Bremer	46	1.78 m (5 ft 10 in)	Stapelfeld	Episode 14	21-20
Keanu Bohatsch	24	1.95 m (6 ft 5 in)	Höhenkirchen-Siegertsbrunn	Episode 14	21-20
Ethan Moore	19	1.89 m (6 ft 2 1/2 in)	Düsseldorf	Episode 15	19
Faruk Aytaç Keçe	21	1.86 m (6 ft 1 in)	Bergkamen	Episode 16	18-16
Felix Lintner	21	1.94 m (6 ft 4 1/2 in)	Vienna, Austria	Episode 16	18-16
Svenja Sievers	24	1.79 m (5 ft 10 1/2 in)	Hamburg	Episode 16	18-16
Lisa Brandstätter	19	1.82 m (5 ft 11 1/2 in)	Lasberg, Austria	Episode 17	15
Samuel Dohmen	23	1.89 m (6 ft 2 1/2 in)	Cologne	Episode 18	14
Xenia Redelmann	26	1.78 m (5 ft 10 in)	Loxstedt	Episode 19	13-12
Nawin Nazary	27	1.87 m (6 ft 1 1/2 in)	Freiburg im Breisgau	Episode 19	13-12
Eva Bloss	26	1.66 m (5 ft 5 1/2 in)	Berlin	Episode 20	11-10
Katharina Van de Sandt	24	1.84 m (6 ft 1/2 in)	Vienna, Austria	Episode 20	11-10
Ray Ewulu	30	1.90 m (6 ft 3 in)	Hamburg	Episode 21	9
Josephine 'Josy' Tolno	19	1.74 m (5 ft 8 1/2 in)	Munich	Episode 21	8
Aaliyah Isla	21	1.82 m (5 ft 11 1/2 in)	Hamburg	Episode 23	7-6
Kevin Vukelja	24	1.89 m (6 ft 2 1/2 in)	Wetzlar	Episode 23	7-6
Canel Delice	23	1.74 m (5 ft 8 1/2 in)	Essen	Episode 24	5-4
Eliob Demofike	29	1.89 m (6 ft 2 1/2 in)	Tokyo, Japan	Episode 24	5-4
Jannik Richter	22	1.76 m (5 ft 9 1/2 in)	Bad Segeberg	Episode 25	3
Zoe Rötzel	19	1.76 m (5 ft 9 1/2 in)	Pulheim	Episode 25	3
Pierre Lang	22	1.94 m (6 ft 4 1/2 in)	Vienna, Austria	Episode 25	2
Magdalena Milic	21	1.76 m (5 ft 9 1/2 in)	Vienna, Austria	Episode 25	2
Moritz Rüdiger	19	1.89 m (6 ft 2 1/2 in)	Berlin	Episode 25	1
Daniela Djokić	20	1.80 m (5 ft 11 in)	Ostfildern	Episode 25	1

== Episode summaries ==
No. overall	No. in season	Title	Original release date
301	1	"Ladies first! Heidi & Leni Klum suchen 'Germany's Next Topmodel'"	13 February 2025
The first episode of the 20th season began with Leni Klum joining her mother, Heidi Klum, as a guest judge in Munich, where around 100 contestants competed for a spot in the show. Various contestants showcased their modeling experience, unique qualities, and charisma, with some impressing the judges and advancing to the next round, while others were eliminated. The episode concluded with the selection of the top 49 contestants who would move forward in the competition.: Featured photographer: Andreas Ortner; Special guest: Leni Klum
302	2	"Wer überzeugt Naomi Campbell? Die Suche nach dem nächsten Topmodel-Mann beginnt"	19 February 2025
The casting episode continued with the top 87 male contestants competing for a spot in the show, with judges Heidi Klum and Naomi Campbell selecting the top 48 contestants based on their modeling experience, unique qualities, and charisma. The contestants showcased their photos, personalities, and skills, with some impressing the judges and advancing to the next round, while others were eliminated.: Featured photographer: Andreas Ortner; Special guest: Naomi Campbell
303	3	"Glamour, Drama, Laufsteg-Angst! Wer meistert die erste Fashion-Show?"	20 February 2025
The remaining 49 girls participated in a fashion show with designer Lessja Verlingieri, showcasing expensive dresses. After the show, eliminations took place, with some girls impressing the judges with their walks and others struggling. In the end, 25 girls initially made it to the next round, but in a surprise twist, Heidi saved Leila, who had been eliminated, making her the 26th girl to join the model house.: Originally eliminated but saved: Leila Charifa Kraus; Special guests: Bambi Mercury, Candy Crash, Catherine Leclery, Jermaine Kokoú Kothé, Katy Bähm, Killian Kerner, Kristen McMenamy, Leni Klum, Lessja Verlingieri, Marina Hoermanseder, Vivien Blotzki, Yannik Zamboni, & Yoncé Banks
304	4	"Ikonisch! Die Männermodels präsentieren Karl-Lagerfeld-Designs"	26 February 2025
The remaining 48 contestants participated in a fashion show, showcasing designs from the House of Karl Lagerfeld, with guest judges Hun Kim and Eva Herzigova. The contestants showcased their runway skills, with some impressing the judges with their performances, while others were eliminated due to lacking potential or failing to meet expectations. The judges selected the top 25 contestants to move forward in the competition, based on their ability to showcase their personalities and modeling skills on the runway.: Special guests: Dascha Carriero, Eva Herzigova, Frieder Sell, Hun Kim, Jermaine Kokoú Kothé, Marina Hoermanseder, Vivien Blotzki, & Yannik Zamboni
305	5	"Tränen lügen nicht! Wer überzeugt mit echten Gefühlen vor der Kamera?"	27 February 2025
The girls moved into their model house and participated in a crying photo shoot with duels, where the winners got to shoot the promo campaign with Heidi. Thirteen girls were selected for a poster shoot, and at the elimination, Angelina, Marie, Jessica, Leila, and Marlene were eliminated after the elimination walk where they had to transform into butterflies.: Challenge winners: Aaliyah Isla, Annett Bremer, Josy Tolno, Katharina Van de Sandt, Lucia Doric, Magdalena Milic, Natali Czesak, Safia Asare, Stella Miljenovic, Svenja Sievers, Valeria Hoffmann, Xenia Redelmann, & Zoe Rötzel; Eliminated: Angelina Matic, Jessica Lüdi, Leila Charifa Kraus, Marie Schöner & Marlene Erdmann Sánchez; Featured photographers: Lado Alexi & Rankin; Special guest: Romee Strijd
306	6	"Harte Schale, weicher Kern? Die Boys zeigen ihre emotionale Seite!"	5 March 2025
The boys moved into their model house and participated in a crying photo shoot with duels, where the winners got to shoot the promo campaign with Heidi. After the shoot, 23 boys advanced to the next round, with Konstantin, Enis, and J.J. being eliminated after the elimination walk where they had to transform into a French street style.: Challenge winners: Eliob Demofike, Ethan Moore, Faruk Aytaç Keçe, Jannik Richter, Keanu Bohatsch, Lian Hansen, Mattes Hafermann, Moritz Rüdiger, Nawin Nazary, Ray Ewulu, Samuel Dohmen, & Tim Schröder; Eliminated: Enis Spahija, J.J. Stocks, & Konstantin Bell; Featured photographers: Lado Alexi & Rankin; Special guests: Catherine Deneuve & David Gandy
307	7	"Das große Umstyling"	6 March 2025
The remaining female models received makeovers, with some embracing their new looks and others struggling to accept the changes. They participated in a challenge on Joko und Klaas gegen ProSieben and later walked the runway in outfits designed by Peter Dundas, who helped Heidi judge their performances. In the end, Lucia, Natali, Stella, and Valeria were among those eliminated, leaving 17 girls to advance to the next round.: Eliminated: Lucia Doric, Natali Czesak, Stella Miljenovic, & Valeria Hoffmann; Featured photographer: Daniel Graf; Special guests: Klaas Heufer-Umlauf, Peter Dundas, & Wendy Iles
308	8	"Schaumparty! Die GNTM-Boys lassen die Hüllen fallen"	12 March 2025
The remaining male models participated in a nude photo shoot and later received a futuristic-themed elimination walk with fog, stairs, and minimalistic outfits. In the end, Felix F., Gabriel, and Christian were eliminated, with Felix F. being noted for his unfocused walk and Gabriel and Christian struggling with their body control on the catwalk.: Eliminated: Christian Preinig, Felix Flad, & Gabriel Moreno von Schinckel; Featured photographer: Markus Schäfer; Special guests: Johannes Huebl & Lena Gercke
309	9	"Sedcard-Shooting mit Yu Tsai! Wer liefert ab?"	13 March 2025
The remaining female models had a sedcard shoot with photographer Yu Tsai, who wanted to capture their natural beauty. After the shoot, the girls walked the runway in 60s-inspired outfits, with Twiggy as the guest judge. In the end, Jule was eliminated due to her weak performance at the shoot and serious demeanor on the runway. The remaining girls advanced to the next round, which includes a casting marathon in Los Angeles.: Eliminated: Jule Gscheidle; Featured photographer: Yu Tsai; Special guest: Twiggy
310	10	"Heidi Klum erobert das Münchner Hofbräuhaus mit ihren Models!"	19 March 2025
The remaining male models had a sedcard shoot with photographer Yu Tsai, followed by a pool-themed elimination walk where they had to walk through water in a masculine way. After the challenges, Felix S., Jonathan, and Ryan were eliminated, with Jonathan struggling with stiffness and Ryan overthinking, while Felix S. failed to convince Heidi at the shoot. The remaining boys advanced to the next round, which includes a casting marathon in Los Angeles.: Eliminated: Felix Schiller, Jonathan Tolno, & Ryan Wöhrl; Featured photographer: Yu Tsai; Special guests: Bill & Tom Kaulitz
311	11	"L.A. calling: Auf in die Stadt der Engel"	20 March 2025
The remaining female models participated in a casting marathon, booking jobs for Elle, Sports Illustrated, and InStyle. Daniela booked three jobs, including a campaign for Zadig & Voltaire, while Safia had to leave the competition due to health reasons. The remaining girls flew to Los Angeles for this week's elimination walk, where Laura was eliminated, and Katrin and Lulu were put in the Shoot-out for the next week.: Booked for job: Canel Delice, Daniela Djokić (x3), Katharina Van de Sandt (x3), Safia Asare, & Zoe Rötzel; Quit: Safia Asare; Bottom four: Daniela Djokić, Katrin Gömann-Elsner, Laura Klingert, & Lulu Gömann; Eliminated: Laura Klingert; Special guests: Anok Yai & Chelsea Jean Lamm; Featured clients: Danny Reinke, Elle Germany, InStyle Germany, Killian Kerner, Marcel Ostertag, Sports Illustrated Deutschland, and Zadig & Voltaire
312	12	"Castings, Castings, Castings! Wer sichert sich die Jobs?"	26 March 2025
The remaining male models attended castings for Esquire and Approved, with some booking jobs and others facing challenges. Faruk sparked drama by accusing a client of body-shaming and insulting him, leading to some boys declining their booked job in solidarity. The group then flew to Los Angeles for the elimination walk, where Mattes, Tim, and Lian were eliminated due to their powerless performances. Alexander and Faruk joins Katrin and Lulu from the previous episode in the shoot-out, and will compete in duels to determine who stays in the competition and who gets eliminated.: Booked for job: ~~Eliob Demofike~~, Ethan Moore, Felix Lintner (x2), Jannik Richter, Kevin Vukelja (x4), Moritz Rüdiger (x4), Pierre Lang (x2), & ~~Samuel Dohmen~~; Immune from elimination: Felix Lintner & Kevin Vukelja; Bottom six: Alexander Van Hove, Eliob Demofike, Faruk Aytaç Keçe, Lian Hansen, Mattes Hafermann, & Tim Schröder; Eliminated: Lian Hansen, Mattes Hafermann, & Tim Schröder; Special guest: Elias Becker; Featured clients: Approved, Danny Reinke, Esquire Germany, KidSuper, Kilian Kerner, & Marcel Ostertag
313	13	"Neue Dynamik in L.A.: Boys & Girls treffen aufeinander"	27 March 2025
The remaining male and female models finally came together in Los Angeles, moving into their penthouse and interacting with each other. Meanwhile, Felix L., Kevin, Moritz, Canel, and Katharina, met in Berlin for fashion week. The rest of the models participated in a Car Wash shoot, where Alexander and Katrin, and Lulu and Faruk, paired up for the Shoot-out challenge. After the shoot, Alexander and Lulu were eliminated, with Katrin subsequently decided to quit the competition. The fate of the remaining 18 models remains unknown until next week's elimination walk.: Shoot-out: Alexander Van Hove, Faruk Aytaç Keçe, Katrin Gömann-Elsner, & Lulu Gömann; Eliminated outside of panel: Alexander Van Hove & Lulu Gömann; Quit: Katrin Gömann-Elsner; Featured photographer: Ellen von Unwerth; Special guests: Danny Reinke, Kilian Kerner & Marcel Ostertag
314	14	"Puppet-Walk und Fashion-Week-Fieber!"	3 April 2025
The models participated in a puppet-themed elimination, where they had to walk in pairs attached to strings while presenting made-up stories. Adriana Lima guest-judged and helped the models prepare. After the challenge, some pairs advanced immediately, while others had to wait for further judgment. Ultimately, Annett, the last best-ager model standing, and Keanu were eliminated, with Annett's lack of risk-taking and Keanu's weak performances in both challenges being the deciding factors.: Immune from elimination: Canel Delice, Daniela Djokić, Felix Lintner, Katharina Van de Sandt, Kevin Vukelja, & Moritz Rüdiger; Bottom ten: Aaliyah Isla, Annett Bremer, Eva Bloss, Faruk Aytaç Keçe, Keanu Bohatsch, Nawin Nazary, Ray Ewulu, Samuel Dohmen, Xenia Redelmann, & Zoe Rötzel; Eliminated: Annett Bremer & Keanu Bohatsch; Special guests: Adriana Lima & Lou-Anne Gleissenebner
315	15	"Actionreiche Woche mit Western-Walk, Casting & "Bergretter"-Dreh!"	10 April 2025
The models who participated in both Berlin and Paris Fashion Week reunited with the rest of the models in Los Angeles and celebrated with a welcome dinner. They then participated in a video shoot challenge, where they had to work in groups to perform scripts in fitting outfits. Some groups excelled, while others struggled. Later, the girls attended an Intimissimi casting, where Eva won and became immune from elimination for the week. The rest of the models had to secure their spots through the elimination walk with a Western theme. After the walk, Ethan was eliminated due to his overexaggerated movements and unprofessional attitude during the shoot.: Booked for job & immune from elimination: Eva Bloss; First eliminated: Ethan Moore; Bottom four: Josy Tolno, Ray Ewulu, Samuel Dohmen, & Zoe Rötzel; Second eliminated: None; Featured director: Sebastian Ströbel; Featured photographer: Max Montgomery; Special guests: Leni Klum & Paris Jackson; Featured client: Intimissimi
316	16	"Staub, Wind & Tränen! "Mad Max"-Abenteuer in der Wüste"	17 April 2025
The female models participated in a casting for Pandora where Eva booked her second job by combining jewelry with a personal story. The remaining models then went on a road trip with guest judge Thomas Hayo, where they had a 50s-themed photo challenge. Later, they did a Mad Max-inspired photo shoot in the desert, where some models advanced immediately while others had to wait for the final decision. After the shoot, Faruk and Felix L. were eliminated among the boys, with Faruk lacking versatility and Felix L. not meeting expectations. Svenja was also eliminated among the girls, being deemed the weakest that week.: Booked for job: Eva Bloss; Challenge winners: Eliob Demofike, Jannik Richter, & Kevin Vukelja; Bottom eight: Canel Delice, Eva Bloss, Faruk Aytaç Keçe, Felix Lintner, Kevin Vukelja, Magdalena Milic, Moritz Rüdiger, & Svenja Sievers; Eliminated: Faruk Aytaç Keçe, Felix Lintner, & Svenja Sievers; Featured photographer: Mario Schmolka; Special guest: Thomas Hayo; Featured client: Pandora
317	17	"Glamour, Akrobatik & Verwandlung: Willkommen im #GNTM-Zirkus"	24 April 2025
The remaining models participated in a circus-themed photo shoot with glass skin makeup, requiring them to remain expressionless and communicate only through boards. The next day, they had a second photo shoot where they transformed into circus artists covered in paint and feathers, followed by a joyful elimination walk. After the challenges, the judges deliberated and decided to eliminate Lisa, who failed to appear natural and energetic in her performances.: Bottom four: Kevin Vukelja, Lisa Brandstätter, Nawin Nazary, & Samuel Dohmen; Eliminated: Lisa Brandstätter; Featured photographer: Kristian Schuller; Special guests: Alessandra Ambrosio, Hayley Hasselhoff, & Peggy Schuller
318	18	"Schwindelnde Höhen & knallharter Parcours - Wer meistert die Action-Week?"	1 May 2025
The remaining models face a challenging photoshoot on a 70m high balance beam, causing anxiety for some, particularly Magdalena who suffers a panic attack and is eventually allowed to shoot at a lower height. Later, the girls compete for a casting with Calzedonia, where Magdalena books her first job. The models then face an obstacle walk with guest judge Coco Rocha. The judges praise many models for their performances, but ultimately, Samuel is eliminated due to his robotic walk and lack of progress.: Booked for job: Magdalena Milic; Bottom four: Aaliyah Isla, Daniela Djokić, Kevin Vukelja, & Samuel Dohmen; Eliminated: Samuel Dohmen; Featured photographer: Max Montgomery; Special guests: Coco Rocha & Kevin Germanier; Featured client: Calzedonia
319	19	"Paris Hilton bei #GNTM: Wer überzeugt Heidi & den Megastar?"	8 May 2025
The remaining models participate in a Color Splash photoshoot, followed by a challenge for Red Bull Organics, which unbeknownst to them was a secret casting call, where both Kathi and Moritz won the challenge and also booked the job. Later, they take part in the elimination walk in heels and tape outfits, judged by Marina Hoermanseder and Paris Hilton. Based on their performances, Xenia and Nawin are eliminated.: Challenge winners & booked for job: Katharina Van de Sandt & Moritz Rüdiger; Bottom four: Aaliyah Isla, Daniela Djokić, Nawin Nazary, & Xenia Redelmann; Eliminated: Nawin Nazary & Xenia Redelmann; Featured photographer: Christian Anwander; Special guests: Betty Taube, Drakhan Blackhart, Marina Hoermanseder, & Paris Hilton; Featured client: Red Bull Organics
320	20	"Drag-Edition! Die Models zeigen ihre schillerndste Seite"	15 May 2025
The remaining models participate in drag queen week, coached by the cast of Queen of Drags, to leave their comfort zones and gain confidence. After rehearsals and a Samsung casting where Jannik and Josy impress and get booked for a campaign, the models perform as drag queens. In the end, Kevin and Ray are put into the shoot-out, while Eva and Katharina are both eliminated.: Booked for job: Jannik Richter & Josy Tolno; Bottom four: Eva Bloss, Katharina Van de Sandt, Kevin Vukelja, & Ray Ewulu; Eliminated: Eva Bloss & Katharina Van de Sandt; Featured photographer: Max Montgomery; Special guests: Bambi Mercury, Candy Crash, Catherine Leclery, Katy Bähm, & Yoncé Banks; Featured client: Samsung
321	21	"Oscar-Glamour & Einzug in die Top 10"	22 May 2025
The week started with a red carpet teaching session by Kilian Kerner, where models showcased their posing skills. Canel and Jannik were chosen to attend Elton John's Oscar party with Heidi. The other models prepared for a nude photoshoot on a motorcycle with airbrush tattoos. After the shoot, Ray was eliminated and Kilian announced that Pierre landed a campaign job. At the elimination walk with Dsquared2 as guest judges, Josy was eliminated after a tough week, despite her impressive journey in the show.: Challenge winners: Canel Delice & Jannik Richter; Shoot-out: Kevin Vukelja & Ray Ewulu; Eliminated outside of panel: Ray Ewulu; Booked for job: Pierre Lang; Eliminated: Josy Tolno; Featured photographer: Brian Bowen Smith; Special guests: Alex-Mariah Peter, Dean and Dan Caten & Grace x Lovejoy; Featured client: Kilian Kerner
322	22	"Überraschung! Besuch aus der Heimat"	29 May 2025
The models get a surprise visit from their loved ones, boosting their morale. For the elimination walk, designer Yannik Zamboni tasks them with walking as fashion aliens in unusual creations, requiring hard stomp-like movements that defy gender definitions. After the walk, Heidi and Yannik give feedback to the families and friends, who then share the photos with the models, resulting in a non-elimination.: Eliminated: None; Featured photographer: Max Montgomery; Special guest: Yannik Zamboni
323	23	"Presse-Teaching & Posen auf Rädern! Wer hält dem Druck stand?"	5 June 2025
The remaining models participate in an interview training with Christian Düren, with Magdalena and Eliob later being revealed as the challenge winners at elimination. Drama unfolded between Aaliyah and Kevin, who later struggled in the recreation of season 12's driving bed photoshoot as a pair. After the live elimination walk with Christian Cowan, Aaliyah and Kevin failed to reach the semifinals and were thus eliminated. Following their elimination, the remaining male models were invited to a casting for ProSieben's new reality series, Die Cooking Academy, where Pierre booked the final job of this season, as shown in Stories.: Challenge winners: Eliob Demofike & Magdalena Milic; Bottom four: Aaliyah Isla, Canel Delice, Eliob Demofike, & Kevin Vukelja; Eliminated: Aaliyah Isla & Kevin Vukelja; Booked for job: Pierre Lang; Featured photographer: Rankin; Special guest: Christian Cowan & Christian Düren; Featured client: Die Cooking Academy
324	24	"Halbfinale: Wer glänzt beim Harper's Bazaar Cover-Shooting?"	12 June 2025
The remaining models participated in the highly-anticipated Harper's Bazaar cover shoot with a "Road Movie" theme. Prior to this episode, the models were tasked with a shopping challenge to buy day and night outfits for their final elimination walk, with some struggling to stay within budget or style their looks effectively. In the end, the finalists are Daniela, Magdalena, Zoe, Moritz, Pierre, and Jannik, with Canel and Eliob being eliminated.: Bottom four: Canel Delice, Eliob Demofike, Jannik Richter, & Zoe Rötzel; Eliminated: Canel Delice & Eliob Demofike; Featured photographers: Mauro Mongiello & Sofia Sanchez; Special guests: Kerstin Schneider
325	25	"Das Finale der Jubiläumsstafel"	19 June 2025
The big anniversary finale kicks off with an opening performance by the ‘Moulin Rouge’ ensemble, featuring the Top 6 finalists. The show takes a trip down memory lane with past winners and other former contestants sharing their journeys since appearing in the show. After a series of elimination walks, and a live disco-themed underwater shoot, the finalists face their last walks. Former Judge Bruce Darnell makes a surprise return for an all-stars walk with previous contestants. In the end, Moritz and Dani are crowned the twenty-first and twenty-second winners, each receiving a Harper’s Bazaar cover and a joint L’Oreal campaign with Klum.: Female final three: Daniela Djokić, Magdalena Milic, & Zoe Rötzel; Bottom two: Magdalena Milic & Zoe Rötzel; Eliminated: Zoe Rötzel; Male final three: Jannik Richter, Moritz Rüdiger, & Pierre Lang; Bottom two: Jannik Richter & Moritz Rüdiger; Eliminated: Jannik Richter; Male final two: Moritz Rüdiger & Pierre Lang; Germany's Next Topmodel: Moritz Rüdiger; Female final two: Daniela Djokić & Magdalena Milic; Germany's Next Topmodel: Daniela Djokić; Featured photographer: Christian Anwander; Special guests: Alex-Mariah Peter, Alisar Ailabouni, Barbara Meier, Bruce Darnell, Céline Bethmann, Colm Dillane, Dascha Carriero, Frieder Sell, Gerda Sadzeviciute, Gina-Lisa Lohfink, Jacky Wruck, Jacqueline Thießen, Jasmin Erbas, Jennifer Hof, Jermaine Kokoú Kothé, Juliana Stürmer, Kevin Germanier, Kim Hnizdo, Larissa Neumann, Lea Oude Engberink, Lena Gercke, Leni Klum, Lieselotte Reznicek, Lou-Anne Gleissenebner, Lovelyn Enebechi, Luisa Hartema, Marcel Ostertag, Marina Hoermanseder, Martina Gleissenebner-Teskey, Marvin De-Graft, Moulin Rouge! ensemble, Naomi Campbell, Nikeata Thompson, Noëlla Mbunga, Pia Riegel, Sarah Knappik, Sayana Ranjan, Selma Schröder, Simone Kowalski, Somajia Ali, Sophie Dräger, Soraya Eckes, Starlight Express ensemble, Stella Sellere, Stefanie Giesinger, Thomas Hayo, Tokio Hotel, Toni Dreher-Adenuga, Vanessa Fuchs, Vivien Blotzki, & Xenia Tsilikova (announced: Aminata Sanogo, Fiona Erdmann, Julian Cidic, Klaudia Giez, Liliana Maxwell, Luka Cidic, Theresia Fischer, & Yvonne Schröder)

== Summaries ==
=== Results table ===
Place	Model	Episodes																							
Place	Model	3 (Note: In episode 3, Leila was originally eliminated but was saved.)	4	5	6	7	8	9	10	11 (Note: In episode 11, Safia decided to quit the competition. Furthermore, there was no official shoot outside of the go-sees marathon.)	12 (Note: In episode 12, Felix L. and Kevin were booked for the job and were granted immunity from elimination. Furthermore, there was no official shoot outside of the go-sees marathon.)	13 (Note: In episode 13, Alexander and Lulu were eliminated outside of panel after losing the shoot-out. Katrin decided to quit the competition. No further eliminations took place, and the fate of the other 18 models would be determined until the end of episode 14. Furthermore, Canel, Daniela, Felix L., Katharina, Kevin, and Moritz were booked for the job and were granted immunity from elimination.)	14	15 (Note: In episode 15, Eva was booked for the job and was granted immunity from elimination. Furthermore, Josy, Ray, Samuel, and Zoe landed in the bottom four but were saved.)	16	17	18	19	20	21 (Note: In episode 21, Ray was eliminated outside of panel after losing the shoot-out.)	22 (Note: Episode 22 was a non-elimination.)	23	24	25	
1	Daniela	SAFE	—N/a	SAFE	—N/a	SAFE	—N/a	SAFE	—N/a	LOW	—N/a	—N/a	IMM	SAFE	SAFE	SAFE	LOW	LOW	SAFE	SAFE	SAFE	SAFE	SAFE	SAFE	WIN
1	Moritz	—N/a	SAFE	—N/a	SAFE	—N/a	SAFE	—N/a	SAFE	—N/a	SAFE	—N/a	IMM	SAFE	LOW	SAFE	SAFE	SAFE	SAFE	SAFE	SAFE	SAFE	SAFE	LOW	WIN
2	Magdalena	SAFE	—N/a	SAFE	—N/a	SAFE	—N/a	SAFE	—N/a	SAFE	—N/a	—N/a	SAFE	SAFE	LOW	SAFE	SAFE	SAFE	SAFE	SAFE	SAFE	SAFE	SAFE	LOW	OUT
2	Pierre	—N/a	SAFE	—N/a	SAFE	—N/a	SAFE	—N/a	SAFE	—N/a	SAFE	—N/a	SAFE	SAFE	SAFE	SAFE	SAFE	SAFE	SAFE	SAFE	SAFE	SAFE	SAFE	SAFE	OUT
3	Jannik	—N/a	SAFE	—N/a	SAFE	—N/a	SAFE	—N/a	SAFE	—N/a	SAFE	—N/a	SAFE	SAFE	SAFE	SAFE	SAFE	SAFE	SAFE	SAFE	SAFE	SAFE	LOW	OUT	
3	Zoe	SAFE	—N/a	SAFE	—N/a	SAFE	—N/a	SAFE	—N/a	SAFE	—N/a	—N/a	LOW	LOW	SAFE	SAFE	SAFE	SAFE	SAFE	SAFE	SAFE	SAFE	LOW	OUT	
4-5	Canel	SAFE	—N/a	SAFE	—N/a	SAFE	—N/a	SAFE	—N/a	SAFE	—N/a	—N/a	IMM	SAFE	LOW	SAFE	SAFE	SAFE	SAFE	SAFE	SAFE	LOW	OUT		
4-5	Eliob	—N/a	SAFE	—N/a	SAFE	—N/a	SAFE	—N/a	SAFE	—N/a	LOW	—N/a	SAFE	SAFE	SAFE	SAFE	SAFE	SAFE	SAFE	SAFE	SAFE	LOW	OUT		
6-7	Aaliyah	SAFE	—N/a	SAFE	—N/a	SAFE	—N/a	SAFE	—N/a	SAFE	—N/a	—N/a	LOW	SAFE	SAFE	SAFE	LOW	LOW	SAFE	SAFE	SAFE	OUT			
6-7	Kevin	—N/a	SAFE	—N/a	SAFE	—N/a	SAFE	—N/a	SAFE	—N/a	IMM	—N/a	IMM	SAFE	LOW	LOW	LOW	SAFE	LOW	SAFE	SAFE	OUT			
8	Josy	SAFE	—N/a	SAFE	—N/a	SAFE	—N/a	SAFE	—N/a	SAFE	—N/a	—N/a	SAFE	LOW	SAFE	SAFE	SAFE	SAFE	SAFE	OUT					
9	Ray	—N/a	SAFE	—N/a	SAFE	—N/a	SAFE	—N/a	SAFE	—N/a	SAFE	—N/a	LOW	LOW	SAFE	SAFE	SAFE	SAFE	LOW	OUT					
10-11	Eva	SAFE	—N/a	SAFE	—N/a	SAFE	—N/a	SAFE	—N/a	SAFE	—N/a	—N/a	LOW	IMM	LOW	SAFE	SAFE	SAFE	OUT						
10-11	Katharina	SAFE	—N/a	SAFE	—N/a	SAFE	—N/a	SAFE	—N/a	SAFE	—N/a	—N/a	IMM	SAFE	SAFE	SAFE	SAFE	SAFE	OUT						
12-13	Nawin	—N/a	SAFE	—N/a	SAFE	—N/a	SAFE	—N/a	SAFE	—N/a	SAFE	—N/a	LOW	SAFE	SAFE	LOW	SAFE	OUT							
12-13	Xenia	SAFE	—N/a	SAFE	—N/a	SAFE	—N/a	SAFE	—N/a	SAFE	—N/a	—N/a	LOW	SAFE	SAFE	SAFE	SAFE	OUT							
14	Samuel	—N/a	SAFE	—N/a	SAFE	—N/a	SAFE	—N/a	SAFE	—N/a	SAFE	—N/a	LOW	LOW	SAFE	LOW	OUT								
15	Lisa	SAFE	—N/a	SAFE	—N/a	SAFE	—N/a	SAFE	—N/a	SAFE	—N/a	—N/a	SAFE	SAFE	SAFE	OUT									
16-18	Faruk	—N/a	SAFE	—N/a	SAFE	—N/a	SAFE	—N/a	SAFE	—N/a	LOW	—N/a	LOW	SAFE	OUT										
16-18	Felix L.	—N/a	SAFE	—N/a	SAFE	—N/a	SAFE	—N/a	SAFE	—N/a	IMM	—N/a	IMM	SAFE	OUT										
16-18	Svenja	SAFE	—N/a	SAFE	—N/a	SAFE	—N/a	SAFE	—N/a	SAFE	—N/a	—N/a	SAFE	SAFE	OUT										
19	Ethan	—N/a	SAFE	—N/a	SAFE	—N/a	SAFE	—N/a	SAFE	—N/a	SAFE	—N/a	SAFE	OUT											
20-21	Annett	SAFE	—N/a	SAFE	—N/a	SAFE	—N/a	SAFE	—N/a	SAFE	—N/a	—N/a	OUT												
20-21	Keanu	—N/a	SAFE	—N/a	SAFE	—N/a	SAFE	—N/a	SAFE	—N/a	SAFE	—N/a	OUT												
22	Katrin	SAFE	—N/a	SAFE	—N/a	SAFE	—N/a	SAFE	—N/a	LOW	—N/a	QUIT													
23-24	Alexander	—N/a	SAFE	—N/a	SAFE	—N/a	SAFE	—N/a	SAFE	—N/a	LOW	OUT													
23-24	Lulu	SAFE	—N/a	SAFE	—N/a	SAFE	—N/a	SAFE	—N/a	LOW	—N/a	OUT													
25-27	Lian	—N/a	SAFE	—N/a	SAFE	—N/a	SAFE	—N/a	SAFE	—N/a	OUT														
25-27	Mattes	—N/a	SAFE	—N/a	SAFE	—N/a	SAFE	—N/a	SAFE	—N/a	OUT														
25-27	Tim	—N/a	SAFE	—N/a	SAFE	—N/a	SAFE	—N/a	SAFE	—N/a	OUT														
28	Laura	SAFE	—N/a	SAFE	—N/a	SAFE	—N/a	SAFE	—N/a	OUT															
29	Safia	SAFE	—N/a	SAFE	—N/a	SAFE	—N/a	SAFE	—N/a	QUIT															
30-32	Felix S.	—N/a	SAFE	—N/a	SAFE	—N/a	SAFE	—N/a	OUT																
30-32	Jonathan	—N/a	SAFE	—N/a	SAFE	—N/a	SAFE	—N/a	OUT																
30-32	Ryan	—N/a	SAFE	—N/a	SAFE	—N/a	SAFE	—N/a	OUT																
33	Jule	SAFE	—N/a	SAFE	—N/a	SAFE	—N/a	OUT																	
34-36	Christian	—N/a	SAFE	—N/a	SAFE	—N/a	OUT																		
34-36	Felix F.	—N/a	SAFE	—N/a	SAFE	—N/a	OUT																		
34-36	Gabriel	—N/a	SAFE	—N/a	SAFE	—N/a	OUT																		
37-40	Lucia	SAFE	—N/a	SAFE	—N/a	OUT																			
37-40	Natali	SAFE	—N/a	SAFE	—N/a	OUT																			
37-40	Stella	SAFE	—N/a	SAFE	—N/a	OUT																			
37-40	Valeria	SAFE	—N/a	SAFE	—N/a	OUT																			
41-43	Enis	—N/a	SAFE	—N/a	OUT																				
41-43	J.J.	—N/a	SAFE	—N/a	OUT																				
41-43	Konstantin	—N/a	SAFE	—N/a	OUT																				
44-48	Angelina	SAFE	—N/a	OUT																					
44-48	Jessica	SAFE	—N/a	OUT																					
44-48	Leila	SAVE	—N/a	OUT																					
44-48	Marie	SAFE	—N/a	OUT																					
44-48	Marlene	SAFE	—N/a	OUT																					

The contestant won best performance
The contestant was immune from elimination
The contestant withdrew from the competition
The contestant was absent from panel but was declared safe
The contestant's placement was not shown
The contestant was disqualified
The contestant was eliminated outside of panel
The contestant was eliminated
The contestant was in danger of elimination
The contestant was originally eliminated from the competition but was saved.
The contestant won the competition

=== Photo shoot guide ===
- Episodes 1 and 2 photo shoot: One-take test shots (Casting)
- Episodes 5 and 6 photo shoots and video shoot: Crying beauty shots in pairs; Promo shoots in groups and opening credits with Heidi Klum
- Episode 7 and 8 photo shoots: My New Look; Nude in a bath tub filled with foam
- Episodes 9 and 10 photo shoot: Sedcard
- Episode 13 photo shoot: Car washers in pairs
- Episode 15 photo shoot and video shoot: Mountain rescuers in groups with Sebastian Ströbel
- Episode 16 photo shoot: Lost in the desert in groups, inspired by Mad Max
- Episode 17 photo shoots: Artistic Marionettes; Circus acts covered in paint, powder, and feathers
- Episode 18 photo shoot: Posing at a height of 70 meters
- Episode 19 photo shoot: Color splash on a rotating wheel
- Episode 20 photo shoot: Drag Queens
- Episode 21 photo shoot: Nude covered in airbrush tattoos on a motorcycle
- Episode 22 photo shoot: Fashion Aliens
- Episode 23 photo shoot: On a bed in pairs wearing lingerie
- Episode 24 photo shoot: Harper's Bazaar covers
- Episode 25 photo shoot: Underwater disco

== 20th anniversary celebration ==
=== 20th anniversary celebration ===
A week before the TV premiere of season 20, ProSieben and Joyn organized an exclusive red carpet premiere and advance screening of the first episode. The event took place at the Zoo Palast in Berlin, and was held on 5 February 2025.

Around 700 fans attended the screening in the largest cinema hall at Zoo Palast, which was filled to capacity. Before the screening, there was a red carpet in the foyer where many personalities connected to the series showed up, including former winners—Toni Dreher-Adenuga, Simone Kowalski, Jacky Wruck, Vivien Blotzki, Lea Oude Engberink, and Jermaine Kokoú Kothe—along with other former contestants—Darya Strelnikova, Klaudia Giez, Trixi Giese, Dascha Carriero, Lieselotte Reznicek, Noëlla Mbunga, Frieder Sell, Jana Wetzel, Julian Cidic, Luka Cidic, Stella Sellere and Xenia Tsilikova; industry guests—David Lovric, Kilian Kerner, Kim Tränka, and Ramon Wagner—and other media partners and known photographers.

During the event, ProSieben’s station management also emphasized that Germany’s Next Topmodel has balanced consistency and innovation over twenty years. The premiere was framed as more than just a media launch: it was a moment to honor the show’s history, its many seasons, its former contestants, and the audience.

=== Germany's Next Topmodel: Stories ===
To continuously celebrate the season-long twentieth anniversary of the series, Germany's Next Top Model: Stories is an online-exclusive companion show streaming on Joyn from 13 February 2025, to 13 June 2025. The show, also presented by Klum, offers behind-the-scenes and never-before-seen footage of the season.

Notable guest stars include this season's guest judges Leni Klum, Killian Kerner, Thomas Hayo, and runway & dance coach Micky Kurz; previous winners Barbara Meier, Toni Dreher-Adenuga, Alex-Mariah Peter, Lou-Anne Gleißenebner-Teskey, Vivien Blotzki, and Jermaine Kokoú Kothé; as well as other notable alumni, including Betty Taube from season 9, Dascha Carriero from season 16, Martina Gleissenebner-Teskey from season 17, Armin Rausch, Frieder Sell, and Grace Zakhour from season 19. This is the second spin-off of the entire series after Die Model WG.

==== Episodes ====
No.	Title	Original release date
1	"Ein exklusiver Blick hinter die Kulissen"	13 February 2025
2	"Von Bänker bis Skater: So ticken die Boys von #GNTM 2025"	19 February 2025
3	"Hinter den Kulissen der ersten Haute Couture Fashion-Show"	20 February 2025
4	"So leben die Models bei #GNTM: Leni Klum führt durch die Model-Unterkunft"	26 February 2025
5	"Unmenschlich und respektlos? Svenja sorgt für den ersten Skandal im Modelhaus"	27 February 2025
6	"Neue Looks, harte Konkurrenz und schweißtreibende Workouts!"	6 March 2025
7	"Erst Döner, dann Beauty! Heidi verwöhnt ihre Models"	13 March 2025
8	"Tränen, Tanz und Traumziel Los Angeles!"	20 March 2025
9	"Von Paris bis L.A.: Fashion-Week-Fieber & Penthouse-Träume!"	27 March 2025
10	"Tränen, Triumph & Transformation – Diese Geschichten berühren!"	3 April 2025
11	"Hollywood-Glamour trifft Venice Beach-Vibes"	10 April 2025
12	"Kreative Flohmarkt-Challenge & Wüsten-Glamour"	17 April 2025
13	"Zirkus, Chaos und verborgene Talente: Die Models zeigen, was in ihnen steckt!"	24 April 2025
14	"Thomas Hayo's Masterclass & ein unvergesslicher Flug über L.A.!"	1 May 2025
15	"Exklusive Einblicke: Die Model-Nannies packen aus!"	9 May 2025
16	"Sonne, Meer und ein emotionales Geständnis am Huntington Beach!"	16 May 2025
17	"Schonungslose Enthüllungen und kleine Geheimnisse"	23 May 2025
18	"Familien-Reunion in L.A."	30 May 2025
19	"Shooting-Wahnsinn, Schauspiel-Debüt & Heidi Klum hautnah"	6 June 2025
20	"Das große Wiedersehen der #GNTM-Kandidatinnen"	13 June 2025
Finale

=== Der große GNTM-Jubiläumsband ===
A special commemorative coffee-table book titled Germany’s Next Topmodel: Der große GNTM-Jubiläumsband – 20 Jahre (Germany's Next Topmodel: The Big GNTM Anniversary Volume - 20 Years) was published on 20 May 2025 by Edition Michael Fischer / EMF Verlag. The hardcover volume spans 224 pages containing a retrospective tribute to two decades of the show, featuring around 150 photographs drawn from across 20 seasons of the show.
