= Germany's Next Topmodel season 19 =

Model contest on television

Germany's Next Topmodel
- Season 19
- Judges: Heidi Klum
- No. of contestants: 40
- Winners: Jermaine Kokoú Kothé; Lea Oude Engberink
- No. of episodes: 19

Release
- Original network: ProSieben
- Original release: 15 February – 13 June 2024

Season chronology
- ← Previous; Season 18 Next → Season 20

The nineteenth season of Germany's Next Topmodel aired on German television network ProSieben from 15 February to 13 June 2024, under the catch phrase GNTM for all.

This marks the first season with male contestants; the first season to have two winners, one from each gender; and the first season to air twice a week. This season marks the return of open-castings, last seen in season 15, and also notably the absence of best-ager models for the first time since season 16.

The winners for this season are 19-year-old Jermaine Kokoú Kothé from Kassel and 24-year-old Lea Oude Engberink from Düsseldorf; who notably had made it to the semi-finals of season 12, but was not cast. Their prizes include:

- A joint cover and spread in the German edition of Harper's Bazaar.
- A cash prize worth €100,000 each.

The international destinations for this season were set in Santa Cruz, Los Angeles and Palermo.

== Contestants ==
Ages stated are as of the beginning of the contest

Contestant	Age	Height	Hometown	Finish	Place
Vivien Walkemeyer	24	—N/a	Landau in der Pfalz	Episode 4	36 (quit)
Pit-Jendrik 'Pitzi' Müller	33	—N/a	Hamburg	Episode 4	35 (DQ)
Yanik Schulze	20	1.89 m (6 ft 2 1/2 in)	Gladbeck	Episode 4	34-31
Vanessa Horst	22	1.78 m (5 ft 10 in)	Viernheim	Episode 4	34-31
Tracy Baumgarten (Note: Tracy previously competed in the eighteenth season of the series, where she placed twenty-third.)	26	1.78 m (5 ft 10 in)	Essen	Episode 4	34-31
Bảo-Huy Nguyễn	22	1.79 m (5 ft 10 1/2 in)	Köln	Episode 4	34-31
Marcia Edhere	23	1.72 m (5 ft 7 1/2 in)	Neuenhof, Switzerland	Episode 5	30-28
Lilian Assih	24	1.77 m (5 ft 9 1/2 in)	Hannover	Episode 5	30-28
Felice Wolfgram	20	—N/a	Berlin	Episode 5	30-28
Livingsten Amalanathan	22	—N/a	Berlin	Episode 6	27-25
Leoni Mecklenburg	25	1.76 m (5 ft 9 1/2 in)	Hannover	Episode 6	27-25
Franz Vochezer	19	1.90 m (6 ft 3 in)	Lübeck	Episode 6	27-25
Max Uhrmacher	20	1.88 m (6 ft 2 in)	Berlin	Episode 7	24-23
Alexandra Bode	21	1.77 m (5 ft 9 1/2 in)	Erfurt	Episode 7	24-23
Yusupha Jobarteh	25	1.87 m (6 ft 1 1/2 in)	Bremen	Episode 10	22-19
Nuri Enoch	22	1.78 m (5 ft 10 in)	Berlin	Episode 10	22-19
Jana Wetzel	24	—N/a	Leimersheim	Episode 10	22-19
Felix Schneider	20	1.90 m (6 ft 3 in)	Bad Füssing	Episode 10	22-19
Lilli Hachgenei	23	1.70 m (5 ft 7 in)	Mannheim	Episode 10	18-17
Dominik Gruber	27	1.89 m (6 ft 2 1/2 in)	Waltenhofen	Episode 10	18-17
Maximilian Kreiner	21	1.88 m (6 ft 2 in)	Vienna, Austria	Episode 11	16-15
Mare Cirko	22	1.72 m (5 ft 7 1/2 in)	Gmund am Tegernsee	Episode 11	16-15
Lydwine Nitidem	21	1.80 m (5 ft 11 in)	Lemgo	Episode 12	14-13
Lucas Schwarze	24	1.86 m (6 ft 1 in)	Norderstedt	Episode 12	14-13
Stella Sellere	34	1.78 m (5 ft 10 in)	Dortmund	Episode 13	12-11
Dominic Spillner	20	—N/a	Katlenburg-Lindau	Episode 13	12-11
Aldin Zahirović (Note: Aldin previously competed in the third season of Switzerland's Next Topmodel, where he placed third.)	23	1.85 m (6 ft 1 in)	München	Episode 14	10-9
Sara Zuraw	28	1.78 m (5 ft 10 in)	Berlin	Episode 14	10-9
Marvin De-Graft	22	1.95 m (6 ft 5 in)	Bielefeld	Episode 15	8
Kadidja Becher	21	1.72 m (5 ft 7 1/2 in)	Vienna, Austria	Episode 16	7
Armin Rausch	27	1.92 m (6 ft 3 1/2 in)	Kempten	Episode 17	6
Frieder Sell	25	1.96 m (6 ft 5 in)	Berlin	Episode 18	5-4
Grees 'Grace' Zakhour	25	1.77 m (5 ft 9 1/2 in)	Düsseldorf	Episode 18	5-4
Fabienne Urbach	21	1.80 m (5 ft 11 in)	Solingen	Episode 19	3
Luka Cidic (Note: Julian and Luka are identical twins; however, they competed individually until episode 16 where Heidi announced they will now compete as a team.)	24	1.87 m (6 ft 1 1/2 in)	Frankfurt	Episode 19	3
Tarkan 'Julian' Cidic	24	1.87 m (6 ft 1 1/2 in)	Frankfurt	Episode 19	3
Ksenia 'Xenia' Tsilikova	23	1.76 m (5 ft 9 1/2 in)	Hof	Episode 19	2
Linus Weber	25	1.91 m (6 ft 3 in)	Berlin	Episode 19	2
Lea Oude Engberink	24	1.81 m (5 ft 11 1/2 in)	Düsseldorf	Episode 19	1
Jermaine Kokoú Kothé	19	1.89 m (6 ft 2 1/2 in)	Kassel	Episode 19	1

== Episode summaries ==
No. overall	No. in season	Title	Original release date
282	1	"Das große Casting in Berlin"	15 February 2024
The season premiere kicks-off with Heidi announcing that there will be two winners this season, one female and one male. Seventy contestants who passed the summer pre-castings wait backstage while others attend an open casting, where Heidi selects potential contestants to advance to the second round. Contestants participate in a walking challenge and personal interviews, with some advancing to the next round and others being eliminated or asked to wait. After a second chance to walk, some waiting contestants are saved, while others are eliminated.: Special guest: Jean Paul Gaultier
283	2	"Casting-Fieber und hoher Besuch"	22 February 2024
The second half of the casting continues with more contestants participating in walking challenges and personal interviews with Heidi. Some contestants advance to the next round, while others are eliminated. The remaining contestants come together for their first fashion show. However, just before the show, Heidi and guest judge Jean Paul Gaultier announce that they need to make cuts due to too many contestants, setting the stage for a dramatic decision.: Special guests: Jasmin Erbas & Jean Paul Gaultier
284	3	"Die erste Fashion-Show: Zwischen Glamour und Tränen"	29 February 2024
The remaining contestants participate in a fashion show, showcasing designs by Jasmin Erbas, with Heidi and Jean Paul Gaultier providing feedback and making cuts. After the show, 14 contestants are eliminated, and 39 models move forward to the next round as the final cast of the season, with Tenerife as their next destination.: Special guests: Jasmin Erbas, Jean Paul Gaultier, Kilian Kerner, Marina Hoermanseder and William Fan
285	4	"Viva España – auf nach Teneriffa!"	7 March 2024
With Tracy's expected comeback, the complete top 40 contestants compete in a photogenic ability challenge, with 20 winners earning immunity for the upcoming elimination and a chance to shoot the promo campaign with Heidi. After the promo campaign shoot, Vivien decides to quit the competition, and Pitzi is disqualified due to inappropriate behavior, leaving 38 contestants. The remaining models then travel to Tenerife, where they face challenges in their new living arrangements. For the next challenge, half of the contestants shoot a beach-themed photo shoot, with some earning a spot in the next round and others being put in danger. Seven contestants land in the bottom, and ultimately, four are eliminated: Yanik, Bảo-Huy, Vanessa, and Tracy.: Challenge winners & immune from elimination: Aldin Zahirović, Alexandra Bode, Fabienne Urbach, Felix Schneider, Frieder Sell, Jermaine Kokoú Kothé, Julian Cidic, Kadidja Becher, Lea Oude Engberink, Leoni Mecklenburg, Lilian Assih, Lilli Hachgenei, Linus Weber, Lydwine Nitidem, Marvin De-Graft, Max Uhrmacher, Maximilian Kreiner, Pitzi Müller, Sara Zuraw & Xenia Tsilikova; Quit: Vivien Walkemeyer; Disqualified: Pitzi Müller; Bottom seven: Bảo-Huy Nguyễn, Felice Wolfgram, Jana Wetzel, Marcia Edhere, Tracy Baumgarten, Vanessa Horst & Yanik Schulze; Eliminated: Bảo-Huy Nguyễn, Tracy Baumgarten, Vanessa Horst & Yanik Schulze; Featured photographers: Heidi Klum & Rankin; Featured director: Rankin; Special guest: Elizabeth Hurley & Jean Paul Gaultier
286	5	"Das erste Catwalk-Teaching mit prominenter Unterstützung"	14 March 2024
The contestants receive catwalk training from Heidi, Jon Kortajarena, and Marina Hoermanseder in preparation for a fashion show. Despite some struggling with their walks, most contestants make a good impression. Due to rain, the outdoor show is moved indoors. In the end, Marcia, Lilian, and Felice were eliminated.: Eliminated: Felice Wolfgram, Lilian Assih & Marcia Edhere; Featured photographer: Pablo; Special guests: Jon Kortajarena & Marina Hoermanseder
287	6	"Das große #GNTM-Umstyling!"	21 March 2024
The models receive makeovers, with 13 models getting new hairstyles. The models then participate in a futuristic elimination walk at Auditorio de Tenerife in elegant outfits. In the end, three more models are eliminated: Franz among the boys due to lack of presence, Livingsten for not enjoying his walk, and Leoni among the girls for lacking energy in her performance.: Eliminated: Franz Vochezer, Leoni Mecklenburg & Livingsten Amalanathan; Special guests: Jourdan Dunn & Wendy Iles
288	7	"Das erste Casting und Sedcard Shooting"	28 March 2024
The models participate in a secret casting for Emmi AG, showcasing their talents and spontaneity, with Aldin and Kadidja booking the job. Later, they take part in a crucial Sedcard shoot in denim outfits. After the shoot, Alexandra was eliminated due to discomfort in front of the camera, along with Max who had a robotic performance, with Max's personal concerns affecting his shoot.: Booked for job: Aldin Zahirovic & Kadidja Becher; Bottom seven: Alexandra Bode, Grace Zakhour, Lilli Hachgenei, Luka Cidic, Mare Cirko, Max Uhrmacher & Nuri Enoch; Eliminated: Alexandra Bode & Max Uhrmacher; Featured photographer & special guest: Christian Anwander; Featured client: Emmi AG
289	8	"Welcome to Los Angeles!"	4 April 2024
The models participate in a casting marathon in Frankfurt, booking jobs for a music video, fashion show, and editorial. Kadidja books three jobs, becoming one of the most successful models. The contestants then travel to Los Angeles, where they settle into a luxurious penthouse and participate in a challenging elimination walk at the Rose Bowl Stadium. Despite some struggles, no one is eliminated, and all contestants receive another chance.: Booked for job: Aldin Zahirovic, Kadidja Becher (x2), Marvin De-Graft (x2), Maximilian Kreiner & Xenia Tsilikova; Eliminated: None; Featured photographer: Jordan Rossi; Special guest: Christian Cowan; Featured clients: Mike Singer, Samuel Gärtner & Sleek
290	9	"Interview-Training: Tränen, Zoff und unangenehme Fragen"	11 April 2024
The models participate in an interview training with Claudia von Brauchitsch and struggle with presenting themselves confidently. Later, they receive a catwalk teaching from designer Kilian Kerner, who is secretly casting for his campaign. The models then participate in a "Tiny Tokyo" photo shoot in pairs, with some, like Lea and Jermaine, booking jobs for Kilian's campaign. Another non-elimination took place with six models facing a walk-off next week, where four of them will be eliminated based on their performance.: Booked for job: Jermaine Kokoú Kothé & Lea Oude Engberink; Bottom six: Dominik Gruber, Felix Schneider, Jana Wetzel, Nuri Enoch, Stella Sellere & Yusupha Jobarteh; Eliminated: None; Featured photographer: Yu Tsai; Special guest: Claudia von Brauchitsch; Featured client: Kilian Kerner
291	10	"Castings, Reels, und Haute Couture"	18 April 2024
The models participate in two challenges this week. First, a casting for Intimissimi, where Grace books a job, and a video challenge showcasing their personalities. Later, they face the elimination walk challenge with wind machines and veils. Before the actual elimination walk, the bottom six from the previous episode participated in a walk-off to secure their spots. After the walk-off, Felix, Nuri, Jana, and Yusupha are all eliminated due to lacking confidence, variety, or creativity. The remaining models then participate in the actual walk, and Lilli and Dominik are eliminated afterward due to struggling with their walks.: Booked for job: Grace Zakhour; Challenge winners: Frieder Sell & Stella Sellere; Walk-off: Dominik Gruber, Felix Schneider, Jana Wetzel, Nuri Enoch, Stella Sellere & Yusupha Jobarteh; First eliminated: Felix Xaver, Jana Wetzel, Nuri Enoch & Yusupha Jobarteh; Second eliminated: Dominik Gruber & Lilli Hachgenei; Featured photographer: Jordan Rossi; Special guest: Winnie Harlow; Featured client: Intimissimi
292	11	"Unterwasser-Shooting: Jetzt heißt es, Luft anhalten!"	25 April 2024
The models participate in an underwater photo shoot in wedding outfits, with some pairs delivering passionate and believable performances. However, others struggle, and four models face elimination. In the end, Maximilian and Mare are eliminated due to failing to fulfill the brief and Mare's panic underwater, while their partners Jermaine and Lucas receive another chance.: Eliminated: Mare Cirko & Maximilian Kreiner; Featured photographer & special guest: Russell James
293	12	"Fashion-Week-Spezial: Drei Designer, drei Shows"	2 May 2024
This week, the remaining models participate in a fashion week challenge, walking for Ashton Michael, Esther Perbandt, and Kevin Germanier, in three distinct styles. Some models excel, while others face challenges adapting to the designers' visions. After the elimination walk, the judges deliberate, and Lydwine is eliminated due to her struggles with focus and posture, despite a close competition with Xenia. Lucas is also eliminated for his robotic walk, which distracted from the designers' clothing.: Eliminated: Lucas Schwarze & Lydwine Nitidem; Featured photographer: Jordan Rossi; Special guests: Ashton Michael, Esther Perbandt, Kevin Germanier, & Micky Kurz
294	13	"Ready, set, action!"	9 May 2024
The contestants participate in two separate challenges: a Nyx Cosmetics casting, where Lea and Jermaine are booked for their campaigns and earn immunity, and a video shoot where the other 14 models face elimination. Fabienne shines as the strongest girl after being paired with Grace and delivers a standout performance. Other models, like Luka and Julian, impress with their acting skills, while others struggle. Prior to the shoot, Kadidja passes-out while Aldin falls ill during elimination, but both of them were sent through to the following week. In the end, Dominic is eliminated due to his lack of authenticity in acting, delivering an inspirational goodbye speech. While Stella is also eliminated after a tough decision due to her poor performance, leaving Xenia and the rest of the group in shock.: Booked for job & immune from elimination: Jermaine Kokoú Kothé & Lea Oude Engberink; Eliminated: Dominic Spillner & Stella Sellere; Featured director & photographer: David Helmut & Jordan Rossi; Special guest: Thomas Kretschmann; Featured client: NYX cosmetics
295	14	"It’s Showtime! Die Models rocken die große Bühne"	16 May 2024
This week, the models face a challenge with choreography and lip-syncing, where the boys struggle more than the girls. Some models shine in their performances, while others struggle with self-doubt. In a separate casting for Calzedonia, Kadidja and Xenia impress and are booked for the campaign, earning immunity from elimination. At the elimination walk, the judges praise Lea's perfection and criticize others for lacking energy or versatility. Marvin, Linus, and Aldin are among the weaker performers, with Aldin being eliminated. Sara is also eliminated for not showcasing enough potential, while Fabienne and Grace join the Top 5 girls. The surviving models receive photos from Jordan Rossi's shoot.: Booked for job & immune from elimination: Kadidja Becher & Xenia Tsilikova; Best performer: Lea Oude Engberink; Eliminated: Aldin Zahirović & Sara Zuraw; Featured photographer: Jordan Rossi; Special guests: Joan Collins, Nikeata Thompson & Rebecca Mir; Featured client: Calzedonia
296	15	"Monsun-Shooting"	23 May 2024
The remaining models started their week with a catwalk teaching session with Nikeata Thompson and castings for Ardell eyelashes and Borotalco deodorant. Xenia books the Ardell campaign, while Kadidja and Frieder excel in the Borotalco casting, with Kadidja booking her fifth job and Frieder getting his first. Some models, like Armin, struggle with self-doubt and pressure to perform. The group also receives news of a nude shoot, which makes some contestants uncomfortable. At the shoot, Linus faces a wardrobe malfunction, and the judges notice significant differences in the models' performances. Fabienne shines as the strongest performer, while Jermaine and Lea also impress. Marvin and Kadidja struggle, and Marvin is eliminated due to his unsureness and lack of confidence.: Booked for job: Armin Rausch, Frieder Sell, Jermaine Kokoú Kothé, Julian Cidic, Kadidja Becher, Luka Cidic, Marvin De-Graft & Xenia Tsilikova; Best performers: Fabienne Urbach, Jermaine Kokoú Kothé & Lea Oude Engberink; Bottom two: Kadidja Becher & Marvin De-Graft; Eliminated: Marvin De-Graft; Featured photographer: Rankin; Special guest: Nikeata Thompson; Featured clients: Ardell, Borotalco, & Kaleen
297	16	"Das große Cover-Shooting"	30 May 2024
The models participate in the highly-anticipated Harper's Bazaar cover shoot, where they aim to capture the essence of modeling from the late 80s and early 90s. Some models shine in the shoot, while others like Fabienne, struggle to warm up. A twist occurs when Heidi decides to have the twins, Julian and Luka, compete as a duo, which could affect their chances of winning or being eliminated. The models then face a challenging elimination walk on a cliff with a transparent catwalk, where some overcome their fear of heights. After the walk, the judges deliberate and decide to eliminate Kadidja, praising her natural smile and striking look but feeling she lacked variety in her expressions. Fabienne is given another chance due to her convincing facial expressions in the close-ups.: Bottom two: Fabienne Urbach & Kadidja Becher; Eliminated: Kadidja Becher; Featured photographers: Mauro Mongiello & Sofia Sanchez; Special guest: Kerstin Schneider
298	17	"Family & Friends"	6 June 2024
The episode starts with a casting for Fila, where Lea and Jermaine booking their third job together, after impressing the client with their edge. The other models receive visits from loved ones, adding an emotional element to the competition. At the fencing-themed photo shoot, Lea and Grace shine as the best pair, showcasing their energy and control. Julian and Luka also impresses with their teamwork, and both pairs secure spots in the semi-final. Xenia and Fabienne receive praise for their individual performances, while Frieder and Jermaine stand out among the boys. In the end, Armin is eliminated due to overthinking and struggling to relax during the shoot, while Linus receives a warning to prove himself in the semifinals.: Booked for job: Jermaine Kokoú Kothé & Lea Oude Engberink; Bottom two: Armin Rausch & Linus Weber; Eliminated: Armin Rausch; Featured photographer: Kristian Schuller; Special guest: Thomas Hayo; Featured client: Fila Deutschland & Deichmann
299	18	"Halbfinale"	11 June 2024
The models face a thrilling helicopter shoot, overcoming fears and delivering strong performances. They then participate in the final elimination walk with artistic and risk-taking walks showcasing designs by Yannik Zamboni. After much deliberation, Heidi announces the finalists: Lea, Xenia, and Fabienne among the females, and Jermaine, Linus, and the twins among the males. Grace and Frieder are eliminated, with both receiving praise for their improvements during the competition.: Bottom four: Fabienne Urbach, Frieder Sell, Julian and Luka Cidic & Grace Zakhour; Eliminated: Frieder Sell & Grace Zakhour; Featured photographer: Vijat Mohindra; Special guests: Elsa Hosk & Yannik Zamboni
300	19	"Finale"	13 June 2024
The season finale featured the finalists competing in various challenges, including a live soccer-themed photoshoot and multiple runway walks. Julian, Luka, and Fabienne were eliminated, leaving Lea, Jermaine, Xenia, and Linus to compete for the top spots. After a series of challenges on the catwalk, Lea and Jermaine were chosen by Heidi Klum to be crowned as the nineteenth and twentieth winners of Germany's Next Topmodel, with Xenia and Linus becoming runner-ups.: Female final three: Fabienne Urbach, Lea Oude Engberink & Xenia Tsilikova; Bottom two: Fabienne Urbach & Lea Oude Engberink; Eliminated: Fabienne Urbach; Male final three: Jermaine Kokoú Kothé, Julian and Luka Cidic & Linus Weber; Bottom two: Jermaine Kokoú Kothé and Julian & Luka Cidic; Eliminated: Julian & Luka Cidic; Female final two: Lea Oude Engberink & Xenia Tsilikova; Germany's Next Topmodel: Lea Oude Engberink; Male final two: Jermaine Kokoú Kothe & Linus Weber; Germany's Next Topmodel: Jermaine Kokoú Kothé; Featured photographer: Rankin; Special guests: Alex-Mariah Peter, Bastian Schweinsteiger, Damian Hurley, Dascha Carriero, Elizabeth Hurley, Kevin Germanier, Kilian Kerner, Lieselotte Reznicek, Lou-Anne Gleissenebner, Martina Gleissenebner-Teskey, Nicole Reitbauer, Noëlla Mbunga, Olivia Hounkpati, Robin S., Sabrina Carpenter, Selma Schröder, Somajia Ali, Sofi Tukker, Vivien Blotzki, Wolfgang Joop & Yannik Zamboni

== Summaries ==
=== Results table ===
Place	Model	Episodes																	
Place	Model	3	4 (Note: In Episode 4, the twenty models who won their duels during the challenge, were granted immunity from elimination. Vivien decided to quit the competition. Furthermore, Pitzi was disqualified from the competition due to inappropriate behaviour.)	5	6 (Note: In episode 6, there was no official shoot outside of the makeovers.)	7	8 (Note: Episode 8 was a non-elimination.)	9 (Note: In episode 9, Dominik, Felix, Jana, Nuri, Stella and Yusupha landed in the bottom six but were saved; which resulted in another non-elimination. Nevertheless, they were put into a walk-off.)	10 (Note: In episode 10, Felix, Jana, Nuri, and Yusupha were first eliminated during panel, after losing the walk-off.)	11	12	13 (Note: In Episode 13, Jermaine and Lea were booked for the job and were granted immunity from elimination. Kadidja was sick and couldn't participate in this week's video shoot. Aldin was sick and was absent from elimination.)	14 (Note: In Episode 14, Kadidja and Xenia were booked for the job and were granted immunity from elimination.)	15	16	17	18	19	
1	Lea	SAFE	IMM	SAFE	SAFE	SAFE	SAFE	SAFE	SAFE	SAFE	SAFE	IMM	HIGH	HIGH	SAFE	SAFE	SAFE	LOW	WIN
1	Jermaine	SAFE	IMM	SAFE	SAFE	SAFE	SAFE	SAFE	SAFE	SAFE	SAFE	IMM	SAFE	HIGH	SAFE	SAFE	SAFE	LOW	WIN
2	Linus	SAFE	IMM	SAFE	SAFE	SAFE	SAFE	SAFE	SAFE	SAFE	SAFE	SAFE	SAFE	SAFE	SAFE	LOW	SAFE	SAFE	OUT
2	Xenia	SAFE	IMM	SAFE	SAFE	SAFE	SAFE	SAFE	SAFE	SAFE	SAFE	SAFE	IMM	SAFE	SAFE	SAFE	SAFE	SAFE	OUT
3	Fabienne	SAFE	IMM	SAFE	SAFE	SAFE	SAFE	SAFE	SAFE	SAFE	SAFE	SAFE	SAFE	HIGH	LOW	SAFE	LOW	OUT	
3	Julian	SAFE	IMM	SAFE	SAFE	SAFE	SAFE	SAFE	SAFE	SAFE	SAFE	SAFE	SAFE	SAFE	SAFE	SAFE	LOW	OUT	
3	Luka	SAFE	SAFE	SAFE	SAFE	LOW	SAFE	SAFE	SAFE	SAFE	SAFE	SAFE	SAFE	SAFE	SAFE	SAFE	LOW	OUT	
4-5	Frieder	SAFE	IMM	SAFE	SAFE	SAFE	SAFE	SAFE	SAFE	SAFE	SAFE	SAFE	SAFE	SAFE	SAFE	SAFE	OUT		
4-5	Grace	SAFE	SAFE	SAFE	SAFE	LOW	SAFE	SAFE	SAFE	SAFE	SAFE	SAFE	SAFE	SAFE	SAFE	SAFE	OUT		
6	Armin	SAFE	SAFE	SAFE	SAFE	SAFE	SAFE	SAFE	SAFE	SAFE	SAFE	SAFE	SAFE	SAFE	SAFE	OUT			
7	Kadidja	SAFE	IMM	SAFE	SAFE	SAFE	SAFE	SAFE	SAFE	SAFE	SAFE	SAFE	IMM	LOW	OUT				
8	Marvin	SAFE	IMM	SAFE	SAFE	SAFE	SAFE	SAFE	SAFE	SAFE	SAFE	SAFE	SAFE	OUT					
9-10	Aldin	SAFE	IMM	SAFE	SAFE	SAFE	SAFE	SAFE	SAFE	SAFE	SAFE	SAFE	OUT						
9-10	Sara	SAFE	IMM	SAFE	SAFE	SAFE	SAFE	SAFE	SAFE	SAFE	SAFE	SAFE	OUT						
11-12	Dominic	SAFE	SAFE	SAFE	SAFE	SAFE	SAFE	SAFE	SAFE	SAFE	SAFE	OUT							
11-12	Stella	SAFE	SAFE	SAFE	SAFE	SAFE	SAFE	LOW	SAFE	SAFE	SAFE	OUT							
13-14	Lucas	SAFE	SAFE	SAFE	SAFE	SAFE	SAFE	SAFE	SAFE	SAFE	OUT								
13-14	Lydwine	SAFE	IMM	SAFE	SAFE	SAFE	SAFE	SAFE	SAFE	SAFE	OUT								
15-16	Mare	SAFE	SAFE	SAFE	LOW	LOW	SAFE	SAFE	SAFE	OUT									
15-16	Maximilian	SAFE	IMM	SAFE	SAFE	SAFE	SAFE	SAFE	SAFE	OUT									
17-18	Dominik	SAFE	SAFE	SAFE	SAFE	SAFE	SAFE	LOW	OUT										
17-18	Lilli	SAFE	IMM	SAFE	LOW	LOW	SAFE	SAFE	OUT										
19-22	Felix	SAFE	IMM	SAFE	SAFE	SAFE	SAFE	LOW	OUT										
19-22	Jana	SAFE	LOW	SAFE	SAFE	SAFE	SAFE	LOW	OUT										
19-22	Nuri	SAFE	SAFE	SAFE	SAFE	LOW	SAFE	LOW	OUT										
19-22	Yusupha	SAFE	SAFE	SAFE	SAFE	SAFE	SAFE	LOW	OUT										
23-24	Alexandra	SAFE	IMM	SAFE	SAFE	OUT													
23-24	Max	SAFE	IMM	SAFE	SAFE	OUT													
25-27	Franz	SAFE	SAFE	SAFE	OUT														
25-27	Leoni	SAFE	IMM	SAFE	OUT														
25-27	Livingsten	SAFE	SAFE	SAFE	OUT														
28-30	Felice	SAFE	LOW	OUT															
28-30	Lilian	SAFE	IMM	OUT															
28-30	Marcia	SAFE	LOW	OUT															
31-34	Bảo-Huy	SAFE	OUT																
31-34	Tracy	—N/a	OUT																
31-34	Vanessa	SAFE	OUT																
31-34	Yanik	SAFE	OUT																
35	Pitzi	SAFE	DQ																
36	Vivien	SAFE	QUIT																

The contestant won best performance
The contestant was immune from elimination
The contestant withdrew from the competition
The contestant was absent from panel but was declared safe
The contestant was disqualified
The contestant was eliminated outside of panel
The contestant was eliminated
The contestant was in danger of elimination
The contestant won the competition

=== Photo shoot guide ===
- Episode 4 photo shoots and video shoot: Promo shoot in groups; Sunglasses at Night by Heidi Klum prod. by Tiësto; Beach castaways in groups at Tenerife
- Episode 5 photo shoot: Posing at the end of the runway in Marina Hoermanseder designs
- Episode 7 photo shoot: Sedcard
- Episode 8 photo shoot: Posing at Rose Bowl Stadium styled by Christian Cowan
- Episode 9 photo shoot: Tiny Tokyo in pairs
- Episode 10 photo shoot: Veiled in the Way of Wind
- Episode 11 photo shoot: Underwater wedding in pairs
- Episode 12 photo shoot: GNTM Fashion Week styled by Ashton Michael and Kevin Germanier
- Episode 13 photo shoot and video shoot: Diner drama with Thomas Kretschmann
- Episode 14 photo shoot: Lip sync battle
- Episode 15 photo shoot: Nude in the rain and wind
- Episode 16 photo shoot: Harper's Bazaar covers
- Episode 17 photo shoot: Aerial fencing in pairs
- Episode 18 photo shoot: Hanging from a helicopter
- Episode 19 photo shoot: Goalkeepers
