= Germany's Next Topmodel season 18 =

Model contest on television

Germany's Next Topmodel
- Season 18
- Judges: Heidi Klum
- No. of contestants: 35
- Winner: Vivien Blotzki
- No. of episodes: 19

Release
- Original network: ProSieben
- Original release: 16 February – 15 June 2023

Season chronology
- ← Previous; Season 17 Next → Season 19

The eighteenth season of Germany's Next Topmodel aired on German television network ProSieben from 16 February to 15 June 2023.

As in the last preceding years, this season featured a preselection without open castings. The first episode introduced 29 finalists, and six wildcard contestants were later added to the cast, bringing the total cast to 35. This is also the last season to ever have an all-female cast, before including male contestants, starting with the following season.

The winner of this season was 22-year-old Vivien Blotzki from Münstermaifeld who is notably the first plus size model to win Germany's Next Topmodel. Her prizes include:

- A cover and spread in the German edition of Harper's Bazaar.
- A cash prize worth €100,000.
- An advertising campaign with MAC Cosmetics.

The international destinations of this season were set in Los Angeles, Las Vegas and Ibiza.

== Contestants ==
Ages stated are as of the beginning of the contest

Contestant	Age	Height	Hometown	Finish	Place
Alina Enns	20	1.77 m (5 ft 9 1/2 in)	Oberding	Episode 1	35-32
Elisaveta 'Elisabeth' Schmidt	21	1.76 m (5 ft 9 1/2 in)	Grasbrunn	Episode 1	35-32
Indira Mölle	20	1.74 m (5 ft 8 1/2 in)	Niedere Börde	Episode 1	35-32
Ana Feddersen	22	1.78 m (5 ft 10 in)	Ostrohe	Episode 1	35-32
Slata Schneider	19	1.74 m (5 ft 8 1/2 in)	Leipzig	Episode 3	31-30
Melissa Stöbke Carbonel	19	1.75 m (5 ft 9 in)	Düsseldorf	Episode 3	31-30
Melina Rath	18	1.73 m (5 ft 8 in)	Linz, Austria	Episode 3	29-28
Juliette Schulz	19	1.82 m (5 ft 11 1/2 in)	Bad Sobernheim	Episode 3	29-28
Emilia Steitz	19	1.94 m (6 ft 4 1/2 in)	Kelkheim im Taunus	Episode 4	27-25
Elizabeth 'Eliz' Steingraf	21	1.82 m (5 ft 11 1/2 in)	München	Episode 4	27-25
Zoey Saflekou	26	1.70 m (5 ft 7 in)	Kornwestheim	Episode 4	27-25
Sarah Benkhoff	20	1.71 m (5 ft 7 1/2 in)	Osnabrück	Episode 5	24 (quit)
Tracy Baumgarten	25	1.78 m (5 ft 10 in)	Essen	Episode 5	23 (quit)
Jenita 'Jülide' Beganovic	23	1.68 m (5 ft 6 in)	Paderborn	Episode 6	22
Elsa Latifaj	19	1.77 m (5 ft 9 1/2 in)	Baden, Austria	Episode 6	21
Lara Rollhaus	19	1.79 m (5 ft 10 1/2 in)	Aschbach, Austria	Episode 7	20
Zuzel Palacio Calunga	50	1.73 m (5 ft 8 in)	Kissing	Episode 8	19-18
Charlene Christian	52	1.73 m (5 ft 8 in)	Georgensgmünd	Episode 8	19-18
Leona Kastrati	19	1.73 m (5 ft 8 in)	Großheubach	Episode 8	17
Ina Aufenberg	44	1.77 m (5 ft 9 1/2 in)	Neuss	Episode 9	16
Anya Elsner	19	1.73 m (5 ft 8 in)	Berlin	Episode 10	15
Anna Celina 'Cassy' Cassau	23	1.70 m (5 ft 7 in)	Hamburg	Episode 11	14-13
Marielena Aponte	52	1.67 m (5 ft 5 1/2 in)	Frankfurt	Episode 11	14-13
Maike Nitsch	23	1.73 m (5 ft 8 in)	Hanau	Episode 12	12
Nina Kablitz	22	1.77 m (5 ft 9 1/2 in)	Wetter (Ruhr)	Episode 13	11
Mirella Janev	20	1.80 m (5 ft 11 in)	Berlin	Episode 14	10
Katherine Markov	20	1.67 m (5 ft 5 1/2 in)	Flensburg	Episode 15	9
Frideriki 'Ida' Kulis	23	1.79 m (5 ft 10 1/2 in)	Köln	Episode 16	8-7
Anna-Maria Fuhrmann	24	1.74 m (5 ft 8 1/2 in)	Bochum	Episode 16	8-7
Coco Clever	20	1.73 m (5 ft 8 in)	München	Episode 17	6
Nicole Reitbauer	49	1.79 m (5 ft 10 1/2 in)	Offenbach am Main	Episode 18	5
Selma Schröder	19	1.74 m (5 ft 8 1/2 in)	Berlin	Episode 18	4
Olivia Hounkpati	22	1.76 m (5 ft 9 1/2 in)	Hamburg	Episode 18	3
Somajia Ali	21	1.75 m (5 ft 9 in)	Bielefeld	Episode 18	2
Vivien Blotzki	22	1.80 m (5 ft 11 in)	Münstermaifeld	Episode 18	1

== Episode summaries ==
No. overall	No. in season	Title	Original release date
263	1	"Welcome to Hollywood!"	16 February 2023
The eighteenth season begins with Heidi Klum addressing criticisms of the show, responding to claims of misogyny, staged scenes, and mistreatment of contestants. She shares her own experiences in the modeling industry, noting its evolution towards greater diversity, and explains the show's production choices, such as editing, challenges, and rules, emphasizing the contestants' agency and the show's duty of care. This response was part of a televised broadcast, but was notably removed from the streaming version. Twenty-nine of the thirty-five models meet Heidi and participate in their first fashion show with designer Peter Dundas, who wants them to "walk like a boy." Some models shine, while others struggle. After the show, Heidi and guest judge Winnie Harlow provide feedback, with Alina, Elisabeth, Indira, and Ana, being the first group of models to be sent home.: Eliminated: Alina Enns, Ana Feddersen, Elisabeth Schmidt & Indira Mölle; Special guests: Peter Dundas & Winnie Harlow
264	2	"Duell-Modus: Die Models stehen in direkter Konkurrenz"	24 February 2023
The Top 25 models settle into their villa and begin discussing room assignments. They then participate in a pool photo shoot where they choose their own styling and duel partners, with the winner of each duel earning immunity for the week. Heidi serves as the photographer and provides feedback, declaring winners and losers. Later, the models receive a runway training from guest judge Elsa Hosk and are set to participate in an elimination walk inspired by Jennifer Lopez's Green Versace dress, but a storm forces the crew to evacuate and cancel the walk. The elimination will instead take place at the next week's video shoot, where two non-immune girls will be eliminated in a shoot-out.: Immune from elimination: Anna-Maria Fuhrmann, Anya Elsner, Coco Clever, Emilia Steitz, Ida Kulis, Jülide Beganovic, Juliette Schulz, Katherine Markov, Leona Kastrati, Sarah Benkhoff, Tracy Baumgarten & Zoey Saflekou; Eliminated: None; Featured photographer: Heidi Klum; Special guest: Elsa Hosk
265	3	"Express Yourself"	2 March 2023
The models participate in a video shoot directed by Rankin, showcasing their personalities through poses and taglines. Thirteen models are still in danger from the previous week, and Melissa and Slata are eliminated for looking unnatural and stiff. The remaining models then participate in this week's elimination walk, navigating four different grounds representing the seasons. Some models shine, while others struggle. Elsa, who had a rocky start, and others receive feedback to focus on showcasing their personalities. In the end, Melina is eliminated for her uncreative poses and bad posture, and Juliette is also eliminated for lacking presence on the runway.: Shoot-out: Cassy Cassau, Eliz Steingraf, Elsa Latifaj, Lara Rollhaus, Melina Rath, Melissa Stöbke Carbonel, Mirella Janev, Nina Kablitz, Olivia Hounkpati, Selma Schröder, Slata Schneider, Somajia Ali & Vivien Blotzki; Eliminated outside of panel: Melissa Stöbke Carbonel & Slata Schneider; Eliminated: Melina Rath & Juliette Schulz; Featured director & special guest: Rankin
266	4	"Strike a pose!"	9 March 2023
The remaining models participate in a "Mad Hatter" photo shoot with a beauty twist, receiving varied feedback. Some shine, like Tracy and Elsa, while others struggle, like Vivien and Emilia. Tensions rise backstage, particularly with Anya, who feels overlooked and has a crisis meeting with her roommates, ultimately deciding to switch rooms. The models then receive a runway training from designer Yannik Zamboni, focusing on a confident, tough walk. At the elimination walk, some models excel, while others, like Emilia, Eliz, and Zoey, are eliminated for their performances.: Eliminated: Eliz Steingraf, Emilia Steitz & Zoey Saflekou; Featured photographer: Brian Bowen Smith; Special guest: Yannik Zamboni
267	5	"Das Umstyling 2023"	16 March 2023
The models receive makeovers, with some experiencing drastic changes. Sarah quits due to her reluctance to cut her hair, while others, like Somajia and Anya, have emotional reactions to their new looks. Tensions rise between Anya and Elsa after a confrontation, and the models participate in this week's elimination walk in groups with guest judge Alessandra Ambrosio. Ten models excel and move forward, while Tracy quits due to feeling uncomfortable and stressed. The bottom six models receive a second chance to prove themselves in a Shoot-out.: Quit: Sarah Benkhoff; Bottom seven: Anya Elsner, Coco Clever, Elsa Latifaj, Jülide Beganovic, Katherine Markov, Selma Schröder & Tracy Baumgarten; Quit: Tracy Baumgarten; Eliminated: None; Special guests: Alessandra Ambrosio & Wendy Iles
268	6	"Sedcard-Shooting"	23 March 2023
The models participate in a sedcard shoot, with Jülide being eliminated for lacking modeling appeal. The remaining models then compete in a casting for an Intimissimi campaign, with some impressing the clients and advancing to the next round. Ida books the first job for her natural ability to transform into any setting. At the panel, the models participate in a "fashion quiz" elimination walk, with some excelling and others struggling. In the end, Elsa is eliminated for her lack of improvement and spark in her performances.: Shoot-out: Anya Elsner, Coco Clever, Elsa Latifaj, Jülide Beganovic, Katherine Markov & Selma Schröder; Eliminated outside of panel: Jülide Beganovic; Booked for job: Ida Kulis; Eliminated: Elsa Latifaj; Featured photographer: Vicky Lawton; Special guest: Rebecca Mir; Featured client: Intimissimi
269	7	"Iconic: Die Models shooten als Marilyn Monroe"	30 March 2023
The models learn a choreography for a Marilyn Monroe-themed video shoot, with some struggling to combine movements, expressions, and lip-syncing. The Elevator Boys surprise them as their partners for the second part of the shoot, where they have to improvise. Some models shine, while others struggle, and the feedback varies. At the elimination walk, the models navigate a LED catwalk, with some exceling and others making mistakes. At the judging panel, the models receive feedback on their performances, and Lara is eliminated for not showing the presence of someone who wants to be in the spotlight, while Coco receives another chance to improve.: Bottom two: Coco Clever & Lara Rollhaus; Eliminated: Lara Rollhaus; Featured director: Lance Drake; Special guests: Christian Cowan, Elevator Boys, & Micky Kurz
270	8	"Surprise! Die Neuen sind da"	6 April 2023
The episode begins with Heidi introducing new models, including five best agers and 23-year-old Maike, who participate in a bootcamp and test shoot. The original cast meets the wildcards, and Anya expresses her dissatisfaction with the new competition. Nicole, Maike, Marielena, and Ina join the cast after impressing in the sedcard shoot, sexy walk, and edgy walk, while Charlene and Zuzel are eliminated. The models then participate in a duel elimination walk, where some excel and others struggle. Leona is eliminated after a second battle, with Ida expressing her disappointment and frustration with the decision.: Wildcard: Charlene Christian, Ina Aufenberg, Maike Nitsch, Marielena Aponte, Nicole Reitbauer & Zuzel Palacio Calunga; Eliminated outside of panel: Charlene Christian & Zuzel Palacio Calunga; Bottom six: Ida Kulis, Leona Kastrati, Mirella Janev, Nicole Reitbauer, Nina Kablitz & Vivien Blotzki; Walk-off: Leona Kastrati & Mirella Janev; Eliminated: Leona Kastrati; Featured photographers: Heidi Klum & Thomas Hayo; Special guests: Coco Rocha & Nikeata Thompson
271	9	"Kuscheltier-Shooting"	13 April 2023
The models participate in a giant toy machine shoot at Venice Beach, with some exceling and others struggling. Anya's enthusiasm doesn't translate to her performance, while others like Olivia, Ida, and Selma receive praise. The best ager models showcase different levels of experience, with Nicole impressing and Ina struggling. The models then prepare for the elimination walk inspired by Jennifer Lopez's Versace dress, a challenge originally scheduled for episode 2, where they have to incorporate three signature poses. Some models deliver strong performances, while others struggle, and Ina is eliminated due to her weak performance. Tensions rise between the remaining models as Anya's emotional reaction to her own survival sparks further drama among the models.: Bottom three: Anya Elsner, Ina Aufenberg & Mirella Janev; Eliminated: Ina Aufenberg; Featured photographer: Sheryl Nields; Special guest: Nikeata Thompson
272	10	"Knallharte Interviews und Tränen: Die Social-Media-Edition"	20 April 2023
The models participate in an interview training, with some handling themselves confidently and others struggling. Cassy, Nicole, and Somajia won the challenge. Later, Selma books a beauty campaign job for Yeauty. The models then participate in a comic-themed elimination walk, where some excel and others struggle. Anya is eliminated due to her lack of improvement and unwillingness to practice, while Mirella receives another chance despite a weak performance. The remaining models head back to Berlin for a casting marathon.: Challenge winners: Cassy Cassau, Nicole Reitbauer & Somajia Ali; Booked for job: Selma Schröder; Bottom three: Anna-Maria Fuhrmann, Anya Elsner & Mirella Janev; Eliminated: Anya Elsner; Special guests: Alex-Mariah Peter, Ashley Graham, Claudia von Brauchitsch & Pia Kabitzsch; Featured client: Yeauty
273	11	"Casting – Marathon in Berlin: Wer schnappt sich die Jobs?"	27 April 2023
The remaining models participate in a casting marathon in Berlin, with some booking jobs and others not impressing the clients. Nina and Nicole secure spots in Kilian Kerner's fashion show, while Olivia books a job for Néonail. Back in Los Angeles, the models compete in a casting for a Zoé Lu campaign, with Ida booking her second job. The models then participate in this week's elimination walk in a ball pit, where some excel and others struggle. Cassy is eliminated due to her lack of versatility and model presence, while others receive praise for their performances and advance to the next round. Marielena is also eliminated, with Heidi believing she will succeed in life regardless.: Booked for job: Ida Kulis, Nicole Reitbauer, Nina Kablitz & Olivia Hounkpati; Bottom three: Cassy Cassau, Maike Nitsch & Marielena Aponte; Eliminated: Cassy Cassau & Marielena Aponte; Special guests: Anna Dello Russo, Kilian Kerner & Martina Gleisseneibner Teskey; Featured clients: Kilian Kerner, Néonail & Zoé Lu
274	12	"Let’s Rock! Die Models werden zu Musiklegenden"	4 May 2023
The remaining models participate in a music decades photo shoot, with some exceling in their groups and others struggling. Later, four models receive a casting invitation for Emmi AG, and Selma books her second job after impressing the clients with her carefree personality. The models then prepare for the elimination walk with a Rock & Roll theme, where some deliver strong performances and others struggle. Maike is eliminated due to her stiff walk and lackluster performance at the shoot, while others advance to the next round.: Booked for job: Selma Schröder; Eliminated: Maike Nitsch; Featured photographer: Derek Kettela; Special guest: Thomas Hayo; Featured client: Emmi AG
275	13	"Überraschung! Die Models bekommen Besuch aus der Heimat"	13 May 2023
The remaining models participate in a "rich girl" photo shoot, where they're surprised by their loved ones. The models then spend time with their relatives in a penthouse, receiving gifts and letters. At the elimination walk, they wear giant princess dresses and face obstacles in front of their family and friends. Some models excel, while others struggle. In the end, Nina fails to make it into the Top 10 and is eliminated due to her lack of progress and wooden performance.: Bottom three: Nina Kablitz, Olivia Hounkpati & Somajia Ali; Eliminated: Nina Kablitz; Featured photographer: Yu Tsai; Special guests: Angelina Jordan & Sofia Vergara
276	14	"Ab in die Wüste: Die Models erwartet ein extravagantes Fotoshooting"	18 May 2023
The Top 10 participate in a road trip, with some starting with the final job casting for Peek & Cloppenburg, where Selma books her third and final job. The models then do a colorful fantasy photo shoot, where some excel and others struggle. Somajia tests positive for Covid and has to isolate. At the elimination walk, the models wear all-black outfits and flat shoes, with some delivering strong performances and others facing criticism. Olivia and others advance to the next round, while Mirella is eliminated due to being outperformed by others.: Booked for job: Selma Schröder; Bottom four: Katherine Markov, Mirella Janev, Olivia Hounkpati & Selma Schröder; Walk-off: Mirella Janev & Olivia Hounkpati; Eliminated: Mirella Janev; Featured photographer: Kristian Schuller; Special guests: Esther Perbandt & Karolina Kurkova; Featured client: Peek & Cloppenburg
277	15	"Viva Las Vegas: Unvergesslicher Abend mit Heidi Klum"	25 May 2023
The models arrive in Las Vegas and had a night out with Heidi and Tiesto. The next day, they participate in an underwater shoot, where some excel and others struggle due to fear or tension. At the elimination walk, Somajia returns after her Covid quarantine and impresses with her newfound power and confidence. Some models advance to the next round, while Katja is eliminated due to her stiffness and weak performance, despite her passion for modeling.: Bottom two: Katherine Markov & Selma Schröder; Eliminated: Katherine Markov; Featured photographer: Russell James; Special guests: Stefanie Giesinger & Tiesto
278–279	16–17	"Happy Birthday Heidi Klum / Das Cover-Shooting für die Harper’s Bazaar"	1 June 2023
To celebrate Heidi's 50th birthday, a one-hour special will air, summarizing her life, followed by a recap of the three most memorable makeover episodes from seasons 3 to 11. The remaining models participated in the highly-anticipated Harper's Bazaar cover shoot, where some excel and others struggle to connect with the camera. They later prepare for a live drag show performance, learning choreography and lip-syncing. At the show, some models shine, while others face difficulties. In the end, Heidi and guest judge Kerstin Schneider decide to eliminate two models, Anna-Maria and Ida, leaving the Top 6 to advance to the semifinals.: Bottom three: Anna-Maria Fuhrmann, Ida Kulis, & Nicole Reitbauer; Eliminated: Anna-Maria Fuhrmann & Ida Kulis; Featured photographer: Regan Cameron; Special guests: DeJa Skye, Kahanna Montrese, Kerstin Schneider, Shannel & Yara Sofia
280	18	"Halbfinale"	8 June 2023
The Top 6 models participate in a trapeze photo shoot and a Mac Cosmetics campaign, showcasing their skills and personalities. They then receive support from loved ones and prepare for the final elimination walk with guest judges Philipp Plein and Elle Macpherson. After delivering their walks, the judges deliberate and announce the Top 5 finalists: Selma, Olivia, Somajia, Nicole, and Vivien. Coco is eliminated due to lacking confidence and power in her presence, but is praised for her captivating face and fighting spirit. The Top 5 models advance to the finale.: Bottom two: Coco Clever & Vivien Blotzki; Eliminated: Coco Clever; Featured photographer: Max Montgomery; Special guests: Drew Elliott, Elle Macpherson & Philipp Plein
281	19	"Finale"	15 June 2023
The Top 5 models master their opening performance and participate in various challenges, including a reverse walk and quick change walk. After a series of eliminations, the competition narrows down to the Top 2: Somajia and Vivien. The finalists participate in a pre-recorded segment with Jennifer Lawrence and have their final walks. In the end, Vivien is crowned as the eighteenth winner of Germany's Next Topmodel, with her Harper's Bazaar cover revealed as the prize.: Final five: Nicole Reitbauer, Olivia Hounkpati, Selma Schröder, Somajia Ali & Vivien Blotzki; Eliminated: Nicole Reitbauer; Final four: Olivia Hounkpati, Selma Schröder, Somajia Ali & Vivien Blotzki; Bottom two: Selma Schröder & Vivien Blotzki; Eliminated: Selma Schröder; Season 19 wildcard: Tracy Baumgarten; Final three: Olivia Hounkpati, Somajia Ali & Vivien Blotzki; Bottom two: Olivia Hounkpati & Vivien Blotzki; Eliminated: Olivia Hounkpati; Final two: Somajia Ali & Vivien Blotzki; Germany's Next Topmodel: Vivien Blotzki; Special guests: Alex-Mariah Peter, Anita Schaller, Christian Cowan, Friedrichstadt-Palast ensemble, Jean Paul Gaultier, Jennifer Lawrence, Kim Petras, Leni Klum, Lieselotte Reznicek, Lou-Anne Gleisseneibner, Loreen, Luca Lorenz, Luca Vanak, Majnoon, Marcus Schenkenberg, Martina Gleisseneibner Teskey, Nikeata Thompson, Noëlla Mbunga, Scorpions, Thomas Hayo, Vanessa Kunz, Vivien Sterk & Yannik Zamboni

== Summaries ==
=== Results table ===
Place	Model	Episodes																				
Place	Model	1	2 (Note: In episode 2, the twelve models who won their respective duels during the photo shoot, were granted immunity from elimination. This episode was a non-elimination because of the panel abruptly being canceled due to a thunderstorm. Nevertheless, the thirteen models without immunity, were put into the shoot-out.)	3 (Note: In episode 3, Melissa and Slata were eliminated outside of panel after losing the shoot-out.)	4	5 (Note: In episode 5, Sarah refused her makeover and decided to quit the competition. Anya, Coco, Elsa, Jülide, Katherine, Selma and Tracy landed in the bottom seven. However, Tracy also decided to quit the competition—which resulted in a non-elimination. Nevertheless, the remaining bottom six models were put into the shoot-out. Furthermore, there was no official shoot, outside of the makeovers.)	6 (Note: In episode 6, Jülide was eliminated outside of panel after losing the shoot-out.)	7	8 (Note: In episode 8, Charlene, Ina, Maike, Marielena, Nicole and Zuzel joined the competition. Charlene and Zuzel were eliminated outside of panel for their poor performance during bootcamp. Furthermore, only the wildcard contestants participated in the photo shoots.)	9	10 (Note: In episode 10, there was no official shoot outside of the interview challenge.)	11 (Note: In episode 11, there was no official shoot outside of the go-sees marathon.)	12	13	14 (Note: In Episode 14, Somajia tested positive for COVID-19 and was put into quarantine. Therefore, she was absent from elimination.)	15 (Note: In Episode 15, Somajia was still in quarantine and could not participate in this week's photoshoot. She would eventually return from quarantine during elimination.)	16	17	18			
1	Vivien	SAFE	LOW	SAFE	SAFE	SAFE	SAFE	SAFE	LOW	SAFE	SAFE	SAFE	SAFE	SAFE	SAFE	SAFE	SAFE	LOW	SAFE	LOW	LOW	WIN
2	Somajia	SAFE	LOW	SAFE	SAFE	SAFE	SAFE	SAFE	SAFE	SAFE	SAFE	SAFE	SAFE	LOW	SAFE	SAFE	SAFE	SAFE	SAFE	SAFE	SAFE	OUT
3	Olivia	SAFE	LOW	SAFE	SAFE	SAFE	SAFE	SAFE	SAFE	SAFE	SAFE	SAFE	SAFE	LOW	LOW	SAFE	SAFE	SAFE	SAFE	SAFE	OUT	
4	Selma	SAFE	LOW	SAFE	SAFE	LOW	SAFE	SAFE	SAFE	SAFE	SAFE	SAFE	SAFE	SAFE	LOW	LOW	SAFE	SAFE	SAFE	OUT		
5	Nicole	—N/a	—N/a	—N/a	—N/a	—N/a	—N/a	—N/a	LOW	SAFE	SAFE	SAFE	SAFE	SAFE	SAFE	SAFE	LOW	SAFE	OUT			
6	Coco	SAFE	IMM	SAFE	SAFE	LOW	LOW	LOW	SAFE	SAFE	SAFE	SAFE	SAFE	SAFE	SAFE	SAFE	SAFE	OUT				
7-8	Anna-Maria	SAFE	IMM	SAFE	SAFE	SAFE	SAFE	SAFE	SAFE	SAFE	LOW	SAFE	SAFE	SAFE	SAFE	SAFE	OUT					
7-8	Ida	SAFE	IMM	SAFE	SAFE	SAFE	SAFE	SAFE	LOW	SAFE	SAFE	SAFE	SAFE	SAFE	SAFE	SAFE	OUT					
9	Katherine	SAFE	IMM	SAFE	SAFE	LOW	SAFE	SAFE	SAFE	SAFE	SAFE	SAFE	SAFE	SAFE	LOW	OUT						
10	Mirella	SAFE	LOW	SAFE	SAFE	SAFE	SAFE	SAFE	LOW	LOW	LOW	SAFE	SAFE	SAFE	OUT							
11	Nina	SAFE	LOW	SAFE	SAFE	SAFE	SAFE	SAFE	LOW	SAFE	SAFE	SAFE	SAFE	OUT								
12	Maike	—N/a	—N/a	—N/a	—N/a	—N/a	—N/a	—N/a	SAFE	SAFE	SAFE	LOW	OUT									
13-14	Cassy	SAFE	LOW	SAFE	SAFE	SAFE	SAFE	SAFE	SAFE	SAFE	SAFE	OUT										
13-14	Marielena	—N/a	—N/a	—N/a	—N/a	—N/a	—N/a	—N/a	SAFE	SAFE	SAFE	OUT										
15	Anya	SAFE	IMM	SAFE	SAFE	LOW	SAFE	SAFE	SAFE	LOW	OUT											
16	Ina	—N/a	—N/a	—N/a	—N/a	—N/a	—N/a	—N/a	SAFE	OUT												
17	Leona	SAFE	IMM	SAFE	SAFE	SAFE	SAFE	SAFE	OUT													
18-19	Charlene	—N/a	—N/a	—N/a	—N/a	—N/a	—N/a	—N/a	OUT													
18-19	Zuzel	—N/a	—N/a	—N/a	—N/a	—N/a	—N/a	—N/a	OUT													
20	Lara	SAFE	LOW	SAFE	SAFE	SAFE	SAFE	OUT														
21	Elsa	SAFE	LOW	SAFE	SAFE	LOW	OUT															
22	Jülide	SAFE	IMM	SAFE	SAFE	LOW	OUT															
23	Tracy	SAFE	IMM	SAFE	SAFE	QUIT																
24	Sarah	SAFE	IMM	SAFE	SAFE	QUIT																
25-27	Eliz	SAFE	LOW	SAFE	OUT																	
25-27	Emilia	SAFE	IMM	SAFE	OUT																	
25-27	Zoey	SAFE	IMM	SAFE	OUT																	
28-29	Juliette	SAFE	IMM	OUT																		
28-29	Melina	SAFE	LOW	OUT																		
30-31	Melissa	SAFE	LOW	OUT																		
30-31	Slata	SAFE	LOW	OUT																		
32-35	Alina	OUT																				
32-35	Ana	OUT																				
32-35	Elisabeth	OUT																				
32-35	Indira	OUT																				

The contestant won best performance
The contestant was immune from elimination
The contestant withdrew from the competition
The contestant was absent from panel but was declared safe
The contestant was eliminated
The contestant was eliminated outside of judging panel
The contestant was in danger of elimination
The contestant won the competition

=== Photo shoot guide ===
- Episode 2 photo shoot: Styling beachwear in pairs
- Episode 3 video shoot: One-take self introduction videos
- Episode 4 photo shoot: Mad Hatter from Alice In Wonderland
- Episode 6 photo shoot: Sedcard
- Episode 7 video shoot: Marilyn Monroe as Lorelei Lee from Gentlemen Prefer Blondes with the Elevator Boys
- Episode 8 photo shoots: Black and White test shots; Sedcard
- Episode 9 photo shoot: Posing in a giant toy machine for Skechers
- Episode 12 photo shoot: Portraying legendary songs of past decades in groups
- Episode 13 photo shoot: Rich girls in a luxurious penthouse
- Episode 14 photo shoot: Posing in the desert with colorful balls and fabric
- Episode 15 photo shoot: Underwater prisoners in the streets of Las Vegas
- Episode 16 photo shoot: Harper's Bazaar cover
- Episode 17 photo shoots: Cirque du Soleil on a trapeze; MAC Squirt Plumping Gloss Stick campaign
- Episode 18 video shoot: Re-enacting a scene from No Hard Feelings with Marcus Schenkenberg

== Controversies ==
In February 2023, at the beginning of the 18th season, Heidi Klum gave a 10-minute speech in which she denied all allegations against her and the show and blamed the candidates themselves. This was once again heavily criticized by both the viewers and the media across Germany. The Berliner Morgenpost wrote: "Everything is wrong, says Klum. She emphasized that 'everything is real' on her show. There is no text or storyline for the models. That's why it's not her fault if a young model feels misrepresented after the broadcast. 'We can only portray a person as they are,' philosophizes Klum. Whether this is true remains questionable. On the one hand, because a story can be cobbled together afterwards that doesn't have to have anything to do with reality. On the other hand, because in the show very young girls in absolutely exceptional and stressful situations meet experienced editors who know exactly what the viewers later want to see on television." Die Welt called Heidi Klum's statement "bizarre". Frankfurter Allgemeine called it a "Catwalk of Shame". Web.de headlined: "Why Heidi Klum's statement is dishonest". Annabelle (magazine) (Switzerland) headlined: "Heidi Klum, this justification went wrong". In an article, Puls24 (Austria) asked whether Heidi Klum practiced perpetrator-victim reversal and Gaslighting. Frankfurter Allgemeine headlined: "This woman only has dollar signs in her eyes" and also assumed that Heidi Klum was doing a perpetrator-victim reversal. BILD asked: "How evil is Heidi Klum really?".

In April 2023, Heidi Klum said about everything that happens at Germany's Next Topmodel: "At the end of the day I'm the boss and I make the rules!"

In April 2023, former contestant Lijana Kaggwa (from season 14) criticized the way broadcaster Pro7, the production company, and Heidi Klum dealt with contestant Anya Elsner. She was presented in an exaggeratedly negative and very one-sided negative way in season 18 and subsequently received countless hateful comments on the Internet. Even some tabloid media such as Focus (German magazine), Berliner Kurier or DASDING spread the hate and cyberbullying about the young contestant in a low-level and anti-social way. Lijana Kaggwa criticized the fact that Germany's Next Topmodel repeatedly produced cyberbullying and hatred by misrepresenting a young contestant and takes the risk of destroying a young woman's life for ratings. A month earlier, viewers were horrified by the bullying of other season 18 contestants towards Anya Elsner.

In April 2023, founder and CEO of one of the largest modeling agencies in Europe, MGM Models, Marco Sinervo, said that not a single one of the contestants from the 18th season has any chance as a model. He also said that Germany's Next Topmodel is shameful for the entire fashion industry.

In May 2023, ninth placer Katherine Markov said that she was misrepresented on Germany's Next Topmodel. She is nowhere near as religious as shown on the show.

Also in May 2023, 10th placer Mirella Janev said about Germany's Next Topmodel, that the show is not about modeling, but about cringe walks and shock value to get the ratings. "I don't know if it's because the viewership has lost its level or the production itself and to what extent that is mutually dependent, but I have the feeling that simply watching 'Germany's Next Top Model' over the time, the show has lost respect.", Janev added. In addition, she continued, if the contestants quarreled, the production would also fuel them.

In June 2023, Berliner Zeitung headlined: "The finale of Germany's Next Topmodel is the most embarrassing show on German TV."
