= Germany's Next Topmodel season 17 =

Model contest on television

Germany's Next Topmodel
- Season 17
- Judges: Heidi Klum
- No. of contestants: 31
- Winner: Lou-Anne Gleissenebner
- No. of episodes: 17

Release
- Original network: ProSieben
- Original release: 3 February – 26 May 2022

Season chronology
- ← Previous; Season 16 Next → Season 18

The seventeenth season of Germany's Next Topmodel aired on German television network ProSieben from 3 February to 26 May 2022.

This is the first season where the maximum age limit was removed, allowing contestants of all ages (lowest age limit still being 18) to enter the contest. Historically, this is the Top Model season to date to cast Barbara Radtke, 68, the oldest contestant, and Wiebke Schwartau, 1.95 m, the tallest female contestant, in the entire franchise.

The winner of this season was 18-year-old Lou-Anne Gleissenebner from Klosterneuburg, Austria. Her prizes include:

- A cover and spread in the German edition of Harper's Bazaar.
- A cash prize worth €100,000.
- An advertising campaign with MAC Cosmetics.

Due to the COVID-19 epidemic, the season was filmed under strict COVID-19 regulations, including travel restrictions. Nevertheless, this was the first season to film abroad since the fifteenth season, as the previous season was filmed entirely in Germany. However, a preselection was still held instead of open castings, and the first episode once again started with 31 finalists. The international destinations of this season were set in Athens, Mykonos, Los Angeles and Ibiza.

== Contestants ==
Ages stated are as of the beginning of the contest

Contestant	Age	Height	Hometown	Finish	Place
Emilie Clement	19	1.79 m (5 ft 10 1/2 in)	Tafers, Switzerland	Episode 1	31-29
Meline Kermut	20	1.76 m (5 ft 9 1/2 in)	Bergisch Gladbach	Episode 1	31-29
Pauline Schäfer	18	1.66 m (5 ft 5 1/2 in)	Schwerte	Episode 1	31-29
Kim Bieder	20	1.70 m (5 ft 7 in)	Rheine	Episode 2	28-27
Matilda 'Wiebke' Schwartau	22	1.95 m (6 ft 5 in)	Berlin	Episode 2	28-27
Kristina Ber	20	1.77 m (5 ft 9 1/2 in)	Lübeck	Episode 3	26-25
Lisa-Marie Cordt	22	1.74 m (5 ft 8 1/2 in)	Hannover	Episode 3	26-25
Lenara Klawitter	24	1.75 m (5 ft 9 in)	Lingen	Episode 4	24 (quit)
Kashmira Maduwege	20	1.55 m (5 ft 1 in)	Winnenden	Episode 4	23
Laura Wende	19	1.75 m (5 ft 9 in)	Günzach	Episode 5	22
Barbara Radtke	68	1.68 m (5 ft 6 in)	Handewitt	Episode 6	21-20
Jasmin Jägers	23	1.77 m (5 ft 9 1/2 in)	Düsseldorf	Episode 6	21-20
Julia Weinhäupl	21	1.73 m (5 ft 8 in)	Surberg	Episode 7	19-18
Laura Bittner	20	1.74 m (5 ft 8 1/2 in)	Großenhain	Episode 7	19-18
Jessica Adwubi	23	1.85 m (6 ft 1 in)	Berlin	Episode 8	17-16
Paulina Stępowska	32	1.70 m (5 ft 7 in)	Berlin	Episode 8	17-16
Annalotta Bönninger	20	1.81 m (5 ft 11 1/2 in)	Schwerte	Episode 9	15
Viola Schierenbeck	21	1.75 m (5 ft 9 in)	Dublin, Republic of Ireland	Episode 10	14-13
Inka Ferbert	19	1.74 m (5 ft 8 1/2 in)	Nierstein	Episode 10	14-13
Amaya Baker	18	1.70 m (5 ft 7 in)	Böblingen	Episode 11	12
Vanessa Kunz	20	1.75 m (5 ft 9 in)	Metzingen	Episode 12	11
Sophie Dräger	18	1.72 m (5 ft 7 1/2 in)	Harsewinkel	Episode 13	10-9
Juliana Stürmer	24	1.75 m (5 ft 9 in)	Berlin	Episode 13	10-9
Lena Krüger	20	1.54 m (5 ft 1/2 in)	Teltow	Episode 14	8
Vivien Sterk	21	1.70 m (5 ft 7 in)	Prien am Chiemsee	Episode 15	7
Lieselotte Reznicek	66	1.73 m (5 ft 8 in)	Berlin	Episode 16	6
Anita Schaller	20	1.77 m (5 ft 9 1/2 in)	Neustadt an der Donau	Episode 17	5
Noëlla Mbunga	24	1.65 m (5 ft 5 in)	Berlin	Episode 17	4
Martina Gleissenebner-Teskey (Note: Lou-Anne and Martina are mother and daughter; however, they competed individually.)	50	1.73 m (5 ft 8 in)	Klosterneuburg, Austria	Episode 17	3
Luca Lorenz	19	1.68 m (5 ft 6 in)	Munich	Episode 17	2
Lou-Anne Gleissenebner	18	1.82 m (5 ft 11 1/2 in)	Klosterneuburg, Austria	Episode 17	1

== Episode summaries ==
No. overall	No. in season	Title	Original release date
246	1	"Auftakt in Athens"	6 February 2022
The season starts with the Top 31 models arriving in Athens, Greece, for their first challenge: a fashion show showcasing designs by Jasmin Erbas, with Kylie Minogue as guest judge. Some models shine, while others struggle with the humid catwalk or revealing outfits. Twenty-eight models advance to the next round, with some receiving feedback to improve their presence, walk, or spark. In the end, Heidi eliminates three models: Emilie for walking barefoot and having a weak performance, Meline for her unfitting facial expression, and Pauline because the judges didn't see any spark and she seemed like she didn't enjoy walking the show.: Eliminated: Emilie Clement, Meline Kermut, & Pauline Schäfer; Special guests: Jasmin Erbas & Kylie Minogue
247	2	"Bootcamp Edition"	10 February 2022
The remaining models participate in a series of challenges, including a catwalk training and a tug of war photo shoot in duels, where they compete against each other. The models that win twice are safe from elimination. After the challenges, Heidi eliminates two models: Kim and Wiebke, who didn't stand out in a positive way.: Immune from elimination: Amaya Baker, Anita Schaller, Luca Lorenz, Martina Gleissenebner-Teskey, Paulina Stępowska, & Vivien Sterk; Bottom four: Kim Bieder, Kristina Ber, Sophie Dräger, & Wiebke Schwartau; Eliminated: Kim Bieder & Wiebke Schwartau; Featured photographer & special guest: Yu Tsai
248	3	"Promo Edition"	17 February 2022
The models participate in a dance challenge and a natural beauty campaign shoot. After the shoot, Heidi chooses 10 models for the opening: Amaya, Annalotta, Barbara, Jessica, Kashmira, Lena, Lou-Anne, Luca, Paulina, and Sophie. They receive immunity from the elimination walk, showcasing designs by Christian Cowan. The remaining models practice their walks and take polaroid photos, with some struggling with their performances. After the elimination walk, Heidi eliminates Kristina for lacking strong presence and seriousness, and Lisa-Marie for not delivering anything that would make her stand out.: Immune from elimination: Amaya Baker, Annalotta Bönninger, Barbara Radtke, Jessica Adwubi, Kashmira Maduwege, Lena Krüger, Lou-Anne Gleissenebner, Luca Lorenz, Paulina Stępowska, & Sophie Dräger; Eliminated: Kristina Ber & Lisa-Marie Cordt; Featured photographer & director: Rankin; Special guests: Christian Cowan, Miguel Zarate, & Rankin
249	4	"Action Edition"	24 February 2022
The models participate in a video shoot where they get paired up and have to create a scene of an argument, followed by getting catapulted into the air. Some models shine in the challenge, while others struggle. Lenara quits the competition due to homesickness and feeling uncomfortable around the other girls, especially Noella, whom she accuses of being hurtful. The remaining models participate in this week's elimination walk in colorful swimwear, where some deliver strong performances, while others struggle. After much deliberation, Heidi eliminates Kashmira for not offering much variety in her walk.: Quit: Lenara Klawitter; Bottom two: Kashmira Maduwege & Laura Wende; Eliminated: Kashmira Maduwege; Featured director: David Helmut; Special guests: Jasmine Sanders
250	5	"Casting Edition"	3 March 2022
The models participate in a casting marathon, where they have four castings and the booked models receive immunity from the live walk. Sophie, Juliana, Barbara, Amaya, and Lou-Anne get booked for jobs and are immune. The remaining models face the elimination walk in revealing lingerie outfits, where some deliver strong performances, while others struggle. After the live walk, Heidi eliminates Laura W. for being one of the weakest girls, despite seeing some progress.: Booked for job & immune from elimination: Amaya Baker, Barbara Radtke, Juliana Stürmer, Lou-Anne Gleissenebner & Sophie Dräger; Bottom three: Julia Weinhäupl, Laura Wende, & Paulina Stępowska; Eliminated: Laura Wende; Special guests: Jean Paul Gaultier; Featured clients: Delicatelove, Faces magazine, Jean Paul Gaultier, Shape magazine, & Themis Z
251	6	"Das große GNTM Umstyling!"	10 March 2022
The models arrive in Los Angeles and get separated into two groups, with one group receiving makeovers. Some models, like Vanessa and Jasmin, struggle with their new looks, while others, like Noëlla and Luca, are more positive. The models then participate in a combination of this week's elimination walk and photo shoot, where some deliver strong performances, while others struggle. After the challenge, Heidi eliminates Barbara for her confusing performance and Jasmin for being the weakest and disrespectful behavior regarding her makeover.: Best performers: Amaya Baker, Lou-Anne Gleissenebner, Viola Schierenbeck, & Vivien Sterk; Bottom five: Anita Schaller, Barbara Radtke, Jasmin Jägers, Jessica Adwubi, & Julia Weinhäupl; Eliminated: Barbara Radtke & Jasmin Jägers; Featured photographer: Richard Hübner; Special guests: Sarina Novak & Wendy Iles
252	7	"Sedcard-Shooting"	17 March 2022
The episode starts with Inka rejoining the group and participates in a sedcard shoot, where the top 12 models will be featured in a calendar for a cancer charity. After the shoot, the models participate in this week's elimination walk with a creepy vintage dolls theme, where some models shine, while others falter. At panel, Heidi eliminates Julia for her lack of sense of timing and uncontrolled movements, and Laura B. for not presenting herself well enough.: Best performers: Inka Ferbert, Luca Lorenz, & Vanessa Kunz; First eliminated: Julia Weinhäupl; Bottom two: Laura Bittner & Viola Schierenbeck; Second eliminated: Laura Bittner; Featured photographer: Sheryl Nields; Special guests: Coco Rocha & Stefanie Giesinger
253	8	"Social Media Edition"	24 March 2022
The remaining models participate in a video shoot where they have to sell unusual products, and some deliver strong performances, while others struggle. The models then participate in an interview challenge with Claudia von Brauchitsch, where they have to interact with each other and answer uncomfortable questions, and some shine with their professionalism, while others clash with each other. After the challenges, the models participate in this week's elimination walk where they have to be fashion aliens from outer space, and some deliver strong performances, while others struggle. After the live walk, Heidi eliminates Jessica and Paulina for their weak performances.: Best performers: Anita Schaller, Luca Lorenz, & Noëlla Mbunga; Bottom three: Jessica Adwubi, Lieselotte Reznicek, & Paulina Stępowska; Eliminated: Jessica Adwubi & Paulina Stępowska; Featured director: Mario Schmolka; Special guests: Claudia von Brauchitsch & The Blonds
254	9	"Fantasy Edition"	31 March 2022
The models participate in a photo shoot in a 10-meter height, dressed in plush toys, where they have to bring out their extroverted side, and some deliver strong performances, while others struggle. The models then participate in a casting for a Levi's campaign, where Juliana and Noëlla get booked for the job along with Inka. After the campaign shoot, the models participate in this week's elimination walk where they have to be dressed in red dresses as living tongues, and some deliver strong performances, while others falter. After the live walk, Heidi eliminates Annalotta for her weak performance.: Booked for job: Inka Ferbert, Juliana Stürmer, & Noëlla Mbunga; Best performers: Martina Gleissenebner-Teskey & Vivien Sterk; Bottom two: Annalotta Bönninger & Lieselotte Reznicek; Eliminated: Annalotta Bönninger; Featured photographer: Marc Baptiste; Special guests: Pabllo Vittar & Nikeata Thompson; Featured client: Levi's
255	10	"Castingmarathon in L.A."	7 April 2022
The models participate in various castings, with some booking jobs and others facing rejection. Luca books a job for an Invisibobble campaign, Noëlla for a Six campaign, and Vivien for a Jean & Len campaign. Martina and Anita book a job for a Lala Berlin campaign. The models then participate in another combined elimination walk and photo shoot, where they are dressed in Moschino as 50s housewives. Some deliver strong performances, while others struggle. In the end, Heidi eliminates Viola and Inka for their weak performances.: Booked for job: Anita Schaller, Luca Lorenz, Martina Gleissenebner-Teskey, Noëlla Mbunga & Vivien Sterk; Bottom four: Inka Ferbert, Lena Krüger, Lou-Anne Gleissenebner, & Viola Schierenbeck; Eliminated: Inka Ferbert & Viola Schierenbeck; Featured photographer: Vijat Mohindra; Special guests: Jeremy Scott; Featured clients: Invisibobble, Jean & Len, Lala Berlin, & Six
256	11	"Bodypainting-Shooting"	14 April 2022
This week, the remaining models first participated in this week's elimination walk where they have to walk in pairs attached to each other, and some duos struggle to synchronize their performances. After the walk, the models participate in a casting for Berlin Fashion Week, where Martina gets booked for the job. The models then participate in a nude photo shoot with golden body painting, where some deliver strong performances, while others struggle. In the end, Heidi eliminates Amaya for her weak performance.: Booked for job: Martina Gleissenebner-Teskey; Best performer: Vivien Sterk; Bottom three: Amaya Baker, Anita Schaller & Sophie Dräger; Eliminated: Amaya Baker; Featured photographer: Brian Bowen Smith; Special guests: Maye Musk & Soulin Omar; Feature client: Marc Cain
257	12	"Der Einzug in die Top 10"	21 April 2022
The models participate in a coaching session with Nikeata Thompson, where they receive feedback on their strengths and weaknesses. They then participate in a trampoline photo shoot with Yu Tsai, where some deliver strong performances, while others struggle. The models later participate in this week's elimination walk, where they have to find their way out of a labyrinth before walking in front of Heidi and guest judge Peter Dundas. In the end, the Top 10 models are Sophie, Lou-Anne, Vivien, Luca, Martina, Lieselotte, Lena, Anita, Juliana, and Noella, eliminating Vanessa in the process, for her weak performance.: Bottom three: Anita Schaller, Noëlla Mbunga, & Vanessa Kunz; Eliminated: Vanessa Kunz; Featured photographer: Yu Tsai; Special guests: Nikeata Thompson & Peter Dundas
258	13	"Dream Edition"	28 April 2022
The models participate in a casting for a Dyson job, where they have to style their hair using Dyson products and talk about it for one minute. Vivien gets booked for the job despite not finishing her speech in time. The models then participate in a video shoot with actress Brigitte Nielsen, where they have to come up with their own story and bring it to life on screen. Some models deliver strong performances, while others struggle. The models later participate in this week's elimination walk, where they have to write a letter from the perspective of their younger selves and release it into the air in the form of a balloon. In the end, Heidi eliminates Sophie and Juliana for their weak performances.: Booked for job: Vivien Sterk; Best performer: Lou-Anne Gleissenebner; Eliminated: Juliana Stürmer & Sophie Dräger; Featured director: Lance Drake; Special guests: Brigitte Nielsen & Kim Petras; Featured client: Dyson
259	14	"Sportsfest"	5 May 2022
The models participate in a casting for Emmi Caffé Latte, where they have to choose an outfit that describes their superpower and take test shoots. Noëlla books the job, while Lieselotte and Martina get into a disagreement over Lieselotte's attitude towards the casting. The models then compete in duels, including a photo shoot and an elimination walk, where they have to showcase their modeling skills and athleticism. After the duels, Heidi eliminates Lena for her weak overall performance.: Booked for job & best performer: Noëlla Mbunga; Bottom three: Lena Krüger, Luca Lorenz, & Martina Gleissenebner-Teskey; Eliminated: Lena Krüger; Featured photographer: Max Montgomery; Special guests: Thomas Hayo; Featured client: Emmi AG
260	15	"Cover-shooting für die Harper’s Bazaar"	12 May 2022
The models participate in the highly-anticipated Harper's Bazaar cover shoot in the desert, where they have to pose with a robot. Some models struggle to find their groove, while others shine with their performances. They later have to learn a dance choreography to The Motto by Tiësto and Ava Max & present it at the elimination walk. After the elimination walk, Heidi eliminates Vivien for not standing out enough. The remaining seven models make it to the semifinals.: Best performers: Lieselotte Reznicek, Lou-Anne Gleissenebner & Luca Lorenz; Eliminated: Vivien Sterk; Featured photographer: Regan Cameron; Special guests: Ava Max & Kerstin Schneider
261	16	"Skyline Shooting"	19 May 2022
The models participate in a photo shoot where they have to swing in the air as if they're floating. Some models struggle with their performances, while others impress with their movements. The models later participate in their final elimination walk, where they have to present a flaming dress on the runway. After deliberation, Heidi and Leni decide on the finalists, choosing Martina, Luca, Anita, Lou-Anne, and Noella to make it to the finale. Lieselotte is eliminated, finishing in sixth place.: Best performer: Anita Schaller; Bottom two: Lieselotte Reznicek & Noëlla Mbunga; Eliminated: Lieselotte Reznicek; Featured photographer: Kristian Schuller; Special guests: Leni Klum
262	17	"Das große Finale"	26 May 2022
The finale features the top twenty models performing with Heidi, and the five finalists walking the runway in designer outfits. Anita and Noella are eliminated, leaving the Top 3 to rest before participating in a live photo shoot with Ellen von Unwerth. Luca and Lou-Anne make it to the Top 2, with Martina finishing in third place. The Top 2 then participate in a challenging upside-down walk before Lou-Anne is crowned as the seventeenth winner of Germany's Next Topmodel and appears on the cover of Harper's Bazaar, with Luca as the runner-up.: Final five: Anita Schaller, Lou-Anne Gleissenebner, Luca Lorenz, Martina Gleissenebner-Teskey and Noëlla Mbunga; Bottom two: Anita Schaller and Martina Gleissenebner-Teskey; Eliminated: Anita Schaller; Final four: Lou-Anne Gleissenebner, Luca Lorenz, Martina Gleissenebner-Teskey and Noëlla Mbunga; Bottom two: Martina Gleissenebner-Teskey and Noëlla Mbunga; Eliminated: Noëlla Mbunga; Personality Award: Sophie Dräger; Final three: Lou-Anne Gleissenebner, Luca Lorenz and Martina Gleißenebner-Teskey; Bottom two: Lou-Anne Gleissenebner and Martina Gleissenebner-Teskey; Eliminated: Martina Gleissenebner-Teskey; Final two: Lou-Anne Gleissenebner-Teskey and Luca Lorenz; Germany's Next Topmodel: Lou-Anne Gleissenebner; Featured photographer: Ellen von Unwerth; Special guests: Alex-Mariah Peter, Dascha Carriero, Jeremy Scott, Julian Macdonald, Killian Kerner, Liliana Maxwell, Måneskin, Marina Hoermanseder, Nikeata Thompson, Romina Palm, Soulin Omar & Tom Kaulitz

== Summaries ==
=== Results table ===
Place	Model	Episodes																			
Place	Model	1	2 (Note: In Episode 2, Amaya, Anita, Luca, Martina, Paulina, and Vivien were granted immunity from elimination.)	3 (Note: In Episode 3, Amaya, Annalotta, Barbara, Jessica, Kashmira, Lena, Lou-Anne, Luca, Paulina, and Sophie were granted immunity from elimination.)	4 (Note: In Episode 4, Lenara decided to quit the competition.)	5 (Note: In Episode 5, Amaya, Barbara, Juliana, Lou-Anne and Sophie were booked for the job and were granted immunity from elimination. Furthermore, there was no official shoot outside of the go-sees marathon.)	6 (Note: In Episode 6, Inka tested positive for COVID-19 and was put into quarantine. Therefore, she was absent in this week's episode.)	7	8	9	10	11	12	13	14	15	16	17			
1	Lou-Anne	SAFE	SAFE	IMM	SAFE	IMM	HIGH	SAFE	SAFE	SAFE	LOW	SAFE	SAFE	HIGH	SAFE	HIGH	SAFE	SAFE	SAFE	LOW	WIN
2	Luca	SAFE	IMM	IMM	SAFE	SAFE	SAFE	HIGH	HIGH	SAFE	SAFE	SAFE	SAFE	SAFE	LOW	HIGH	SAFE	SAFE	SAFE	SAFE	OUT
3	Martina	SAFE	IMM	SAFE	SAFE	SAFE	SAFE	SAFE	SAFE	HIGH	SAFE	SAFE	SAFE	SAFE	LOW	SAFE	SAFE	LOW	LOW	OUT	
4	Noëlla	SAFE	SAFE	SAFE	SAFE	SAFE	SAFE	SAFE	HIGH	SAFE	SAFE	SAFE	LOW	SAFE	HIGH	SAFE	LOW	SAFE	OUT		
5	Anita	SAFE	IMM	SAFE	SAFE	SAFE	LOW	SAFE	HIGH	SAFE	SAFE	LOW	LOW	SAFE	SAFE	SAFE	HIGH	OUT			
6	Lieselotte	SAFE	SAFE	SAFE	SAFE	SAFE	SAFE	SAFE	LOW	LOW	SAFE	SAFE	SAFE	SAFE	SAFE	HIGH	OUT				
7	Vivien	SAFE	IMM	SAFE	SAFE	SAFE	HIGH	SAFE	SAFE	HIGH	SAFE	HIGH	SAFE	SAFE	SAFE	OUT					
8	Lena	SAFE	SAFE	IMM	SAFE	SAFE	SAFE	SAFE	SAFE	SAFE	LOW	SAFE	SAFE	SAFE	OUT						
9-10	Juliana	SAFE	SAFE	SAFE	SAFE	IMM	SAFE	SAFE	SAFE	SAFE	SAFE	SAFE	SAFE	OUT							
9-10	Sophie	SAFE	LOW	IMM	SAFE	IMM	SAFE	SAFE	SAFE	SAFE	SAFE	LOW	SAFE	OUT							
11	Vanessa	SAFE	SAFE	SAFE	SAFE	SAFE	SAFE	HIGH	SAFE	SAFE	SAFE	SAFE	OUT								
12	Amaya	SAFE	IMM	IMM	SAFE	IMM	HIGH	SAFE	SAFE	SAFE	SAFE	OUT									
13-14	Inka	SAFE	SAFE	SAFE	SAFE	SAFE	—N/a	HIGH	SAFE	SAFE	OUT										
13-14	Viola	SAFE	SAFE	SAFE	SAFE	SAFE	HIGH	LOW	SAFE	SAFE	OUT										
15	Annalotta	SAFE	SAFE	IMM	SAFE	SAFE	SAFE	SAFE	SAFE	OUT											
16-17	Jessica	SAFE	SAFE	IMM	SAFE	SAFE	LOW	SAFE	OUT												
16-17	Paulina	SAFE	IMM	IMM	SAFE	LOW	SAFE	SAFE	OUT												
18-19	Julia	SAFE	SAFE	SAFE	SAFE	LOW	LOW	OUT													
18-19	Laura B.	SAFE	SAFE	SAFE	SAFE	SAFE	SAFE	OUT													
20-21	Barbara	SAFE	SAFE	IMM	SAFE	IMM	OUT														
20-21	Jasmin	SAFE	SAFE	SAFE	SAFE	SAFE	OUT														
22	Laura W.	SAFE	SAFE	SAFE	LOW	OUT															
23	Kashmira	SAFE	SAFE	IMM	OUT																
24	Lenara	SAFE	SAFE	SAFE	QUIT																
25-26	Kristina	SAFE	LOW	OUT																	
25-26	Lisa-Marie	SAFE	SAFE	OUT																	
27-28	Kim	SAFE	OUT																		
27-28	Wiebke	SAFE	OUT																		
29-31	Emilie	OUT																			
29-31	Meline	OUT																			
29-31	Pauline	OUT																			

The contestant won best performance
The contestant was immune from elimination
The contestant withdrew from the competition
The contestant was eliminated
The contestant was in danger of elimination
The contestant won the competition

=== Photo shoot guide ===
- Episode 2 photo shoot: Tug of war in pairs
- Episode 3 photo shoot and video shoot: Promo shoot in groups + opening credits with Heidi Klum
- Episode 4 video shoot: Old timers while acting out an argument scene
- Episode 6 photo shoot: Posing at the runway in velvet catsuits
- Episode 7 photo shoot: Sedcard & yeswecan!cer 2022/2023 Calendar Campaign
- Episode 8 video shoot: Social media influencers selling a product
- Episode 9 photo shoot: Plush Couture in mid-air in groups
- Episode 10 photo shoot: Retro housewives dressed in Moschino
- Episode 11 photo shoot: Nude covered in gold body paint on a big clock
- Episode 12 photo shoot: Jumping on a trampoline in Los Angeles
- Episode 13 video shoot: Visitors in a jail phone booth with Brigitte Nielsen
- Episode 14 photo shoot: Playing tennis showcasing white fashion gowns
- Episode 15 photo shoot: Harper's Bazaar cover
- Episode 16 photo shoot: Posing in heights & couture dresses
- Episode 17 photo shoot: Jumping on a pink giant bed dressed in Moschino

== Controversies ==
Jasmin Jägers boycotted the live finale of season 17. Due to the bad experiences of former participants, she no longer wants to be associated with Germany's Next Topmodel.

During the live finale Heidi Klum said towards the criticism of the show: "Dear critics, unfortunately I have to disappoint you. We're going on as before." This was condemned in the strongest terms by both the German media and viewers and caused outrage in Germany. Der Spiegel headlined: "Final in Heidi's torture cellar". Stern (magazine) headlined "Stupid instead of diversity - how Heidi Klum doesn't want to change anything" and T-Online said: "The ego show of the GNTM deadbeat mom". The well-known German comedian Carolin Kebekus said "Germany's Next Topmodel made many great: eating disorders, self-loathing, cyberbullying" and "this year they went crazy for diversity because every woman has the right to be humiliated by Heidi Klum."
