= Leni Klum =

German and American model (born 2004)

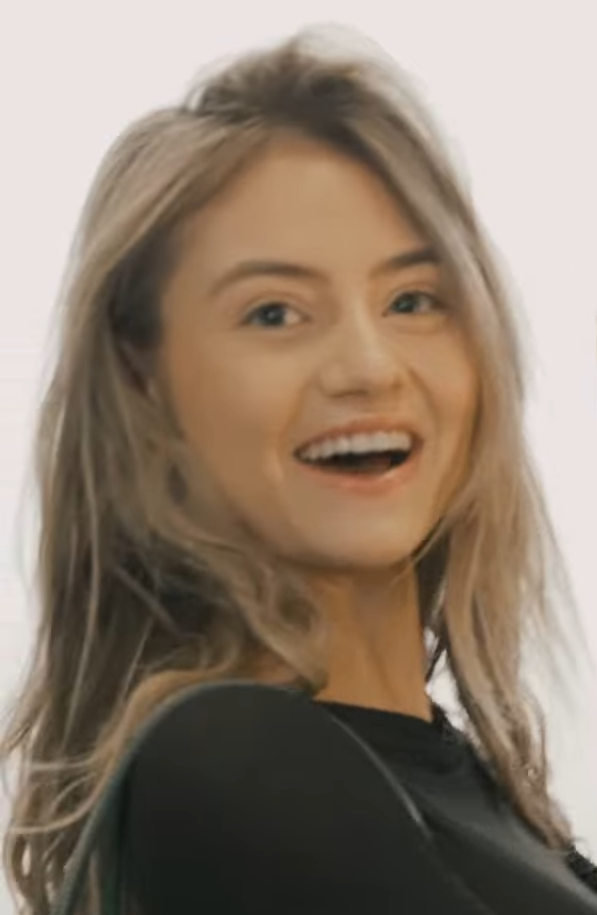
- Klum in 2023
- Born: Leni Olumi Klum; May 4, 2004 (age 22); Lenox Hill, New York City, U.S.
- Citizenship: Germany, United States (since 2020)
- Occupation: Model
- Years active: 2020–present
- Parents: Heidi Klum (mother); Flavio Briatore (father); Elisabetta Gregoraci (step-mother); Seal (adoptive father); Tom Kaulitz (step-father)
- Relatives: Falco Nathan Briatore (half-brother); Bill Kaulitz (step-uncle)
- Modeling information
- Height: 5 ft 2.3 in (158 cm)
- Hair color: blonde
- Eye color: blue
- Agency: IMG

Leni Olumi Klum (/liːˈnaɪ/ lee-NY; born May 4, 2004) is a German and American fashion model. She is the oldest child of Heidi Klum and Flavio Briatore, the adopted daughter of Seal, and the step-daughter of Tom Kaulitz.

== Early life ==
Leni Olumi Klum was born on May 4, 2004, at Lenox Hill Hospital in Lenox Hill, Manhattan in New York City. The first of four children born to German-American model Heidi Klum. Klum's father is Italian businessman and managing director of Renault's Formula One team Flavio Briatore; Klum's mother and father separated while her mother was pregnant. Heidi soon began a relationship with British singer Seal, who was present for Leni's birth and adopted her when she was five years old. Through Heidi's marriage to Seal, Klum has three younger half-siblings: Henry, Johan, and Lou. Klum has remained close to Seal; in 2021 they made their first joint red-carpet appearance at the Los Angeles premiere of The Harder They Fall, a film directed by Seal's brother Jeymes Samuel. Briatore was not involved in Leni's upbringing, though she reestablished a relationship with him by 2023.

Klum grew up out of the public eye but became interested in modeling when she was 11 or 12, though her mother did not allow her to model until she turned 16. Raised in Los Angeles, she graduated from Pacifica Christian High School in 2022, and enrolled at New York University, studying interior design. Klum has said that she tries to ignore the negative reactions and focus on positive feedback.

== Career ==
At the end of 2020, Klum made her modeling debut on the January/February 2021 cover of Vogue Germany, appearing alongside her mother wearing colourful coordinated pantsuits. She walked her first runway as the opening model in a digital edition of Berlin Fashion Week at the start of 2021. Klum appeared on her first solo magazine cover in April 2021, wearing a floral dress for Glamour Germany. She then signed with CAA Fashion, later changing her representation to IMG. In 2021, Klum released her first fashion collection, a capsule collaboration with the online retailer About You, opening the brand's fashion week show in Berlin. Klum walked Dolce & Gabbana's Alta Moda haute couture show in Ortigia, Sicily, in July 2022, having appeared in the same show the previous year.

Klum appeared on various other magazine covers before turning 20, including Harper's Bazaar Kazakhstan, Hunger, Flaunt, and Rollacoaster, and was in advertising campaigns for brands such as Dior, Fila, and Michael Kors. Klum and her mother have modeled together in a series of lingerie advertisements for Intimissimi since 2022, which received some criticism. Klum appeared as a guest judge in the semifinals of her mother's show Germany's Next Topmodel in 2022 and returned in the finals in 2023. She amassed more than 800,000 followers on Instagram by 2023.
