= Sheryl Nields =

American portrait photographer

- Born: Los Angeles, California, U.S.
- Known for: Portrait photography
- Website: Copious Management

Sheryl Nields is an American portrait photographer.

== Early life and education ==
Nields grew up in Los Angeles, California. She attended Parsons School of Design, and then worked as an assistant to Patrick Demarchelier and Walter Chin. She started photographing musicians and bands. A photograph of Beck appeared in Spin in 1994.

== Career ==
Nields has photographed actors and musicians including Sheryl Crow, Christina Hendricks, Scarlett Johansson, Milla Jovovich, Diane Lane, Tobey Maguire, Prince, Ben Stiller, Charlize Theron, and Naomi Watts. Nields was among the thirty-five photographers included by Fergus Greer in The World’s Top Photographers: Portraits in 2004. In 2005 she photographed Carmen Electra for 4 Inches, a fundraising book and auction project for the Elton John AIDS Foundation. A photograph of Jack Black was used for the movie poster for Nacho Libre in 2006. In 2009 she photographed Dita Von Teese for Dita Stripteese, a collection of three striptease flip books. For Traummänner at the Deichtorhallen in Hamburg in 2011, she photographed a friend in a Spider-Man mask and sweatshirt.
