= Kevin Germanier =

Swiss fashion designer (born 1992)

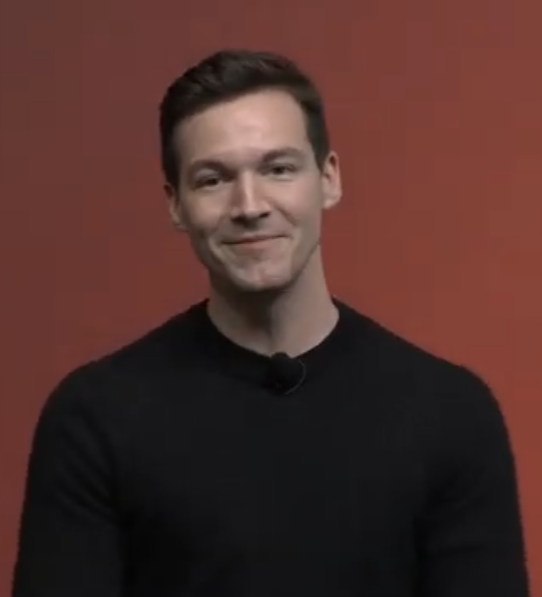
- Germanier in 2024
- Born: 1992 (age 33–34); Granges, Valais, Switzerland
- Education: Central Saint Martins
- Occupation: Fashion designer
- Years active: 2018–present
- Known for: Founder of the fashion house Germanier

Kevin Germanier (also styled Kévin Germanier; born 1992) is a Swiss fashion designer based in Paris. He is the founder of the fashion house Germanier, launched in 2018, whose collections are built almost entirely from upcycled materials such as discarded beads and sequins, unsold fabric, and salvaged plastics.

Germanier won the EcoChic Design Award in 2015 while a student at Central Saint Martins in London, and was later a finalist for the ANDAM Creative Label Prize in 2018 and a semi-finalist for the LVMH Prize in 2019. He became widely known in 2024 after designing costumes for the opening and closing ceremonies of the 2024 Summer Olympics in Paris, among them the gilded "Golden Voyager" worn by the acrobat Arthur Cadre. In January 2025 he presented his first haute couture collection as a guest house on the official calendar of the Fédération de la Haute Couture et de la Mode.

== Early life and education ==
Germanier was born in 1992 in Granges, a village in the Swiss canton of Valais. He has attributed his interest in reused materials to his childhood, where his mother and grandmother would embroider over a hole in a garment rather than replace it. After a foundation year in art and design in Geneva, he enrolled at Central Saint Martins.

In 2015, while representing the United Kingdom as a student at Central Saint Martins, he won the EcoChic Design Award, a Hong Kong competition organized by the environmental non-governmental organization Redress and since renamed the Redress Design Award. The prize was a commission to create the first upcycled collection for the luxury brand Shanghai Tang; Germanier spent three months with the brand's design team, and the collection was released in 2016. He has traced his use of salvaged beadwork to a placement in Hong Kong, where he obtained bags of pearls that had faded in a shop window, and to glass beads being discarded because their individual tinting made them impossible to melt down and reuse.

A six-month internship at Louis Vuitton in 2015 helped finance his studies, and he graduated in 2017.

== Career ==
=== Founding of Germanier ===
After graduating, Germanier settled in Paris and launched his label the following year, showing for the first time at Paris Fashion Week in March 2018. He worked as a junior designer in Louis Vuitton's leather goods department, moonlighting on his own collections in the evenings, before leaving to concentrate on the business full-time. The retailer Matches Fashion became the label's early exclusive stockist, and by the end of 2018 the house employed about twelve people across Paris, London and Switzerland.

The house was a finalist for the ANDAM Creative Label Prize in 2018, an award won that year by Ludovic de Saint Sernin, received the New Generation Award from Vogue Talents and Swarovski the same year, and was a semi-finalist for the LVMH Prize in 2019. Germanier was named to the Forbes 30 Under 30 Europe list in the arts and culture category in 2020, and has served as an international judge of the Redress Design Award since 2023. His label has shown on the official Paris Fashion Week calendar since 2020.

In 2023 he received the Prix Rünzi, an award of 20,000 Swiss francs presented since 1972 by the "Divisionnaire F. K. Rünzi" foundation to figures who have brought distinction to the canton of Valais.

=== 2024 Summer Olympics ===
Germanier was responsible for costumes at the opening and closing ceremonies of the 2024 Summer Olympics in Paris. For the closing ceremony he designed the "Golden Voyager," an aerial figure performed by the dancer and contortionist Arthur Cadre; he worked on the costume in secrecy for nine months and described the commission as the largest platform he had been given. The design combined pearls with recycled videotape from cassettes kept since his childhood, alongside textiles from LVMH's Nona Source deadstock platform and gold beads and sequins diverted from landfill through his sourcing house in Hong Kong. His team produced more than 120 additional looks for the ceremony's dancers.

=== Haute couture ===
Germanier joined the official Paris haute couture calendar as a guest house and showed his first couture collection in January 2025. The Fédération de la Haute Couture et de la Mode reserves the legally protected "haute couture" designation for a small group of accredited houses, which must meet requirements on workshops, staffing and made-to-measure production, but also invites additional guest designers to the calendar each season; Germanier has continued to show in that capacity. His second couture collection, Les Joueuses, was presented in July 2025 at the IRCAM in Paris and comprised about thirty looks.

=== Work with LVMH ===
Germanier was creative director of Prélude, an initiative launched by LVMH to rework mainly unsold products from its fashion houses, first shown in 2024. For his spring 2026 couture collection he used leftover stock from seven LVMH-owned houses, including French team uniforms designed by Berluti for the 2024 Olympic and Paralympic ceremonies. An excerpt from the collection opened the Global Fashion Summit in Copenhagen on May 6, 2026, presented alongside LVMH's environment development director Hélène Valade.

=== Other work ===
Germanier was head of costume for the Eurovision Song Contest 2025 in Basel. He dressed the presenters Michelle Hunziker, Sandra Studer and Hazel Brugger and supplied roughly 200 costumes for the semi-finals and the final, but not for the competing acts.

Between November 2025 and March 2026 the Museum of Contemporary Design and Applied Arts in Lausanne gave him a carte blanche exhibition, Les Monstrueuses, his first solo museum show. In 2026 he became the first fashion designer to create an official poster for the Montreux Jazz Festival, producing an embroidered artwork for the festival's 60th edition from materials recovered from his earlier collections; earlier posters have been made by artists including Andy Warhol, Keith Haring and David Bowie.

== Design approach ==
Germanier works with upcycled and deadstock materials, including beads, crystals, feathers and reclaimed textiles, and developed a silicone-based method of fixing beadwork that distinguishes his construction from conventional hand embroidery. He sources from second-hand shops and from suppliers of damaged or surplus components, drawing on contacts in countries including France, South Korea, Italy, China and Thailand, and has also built collections from unsold stock held by LVMH-owned houses. Knitwear for the label is hand-made by his grandmother and a circle of knitters in Valais; a piece from that line was worn by Lily Collins in Emily in Paris. He also works with artisans in Brazil, India and the Philippines.

He has rejected the assumption that recycled clothing must look austere, arguing that sustainable fashion can be glamorous and desirable. He has also played down the activist framing sometimes applied to his work, telling Agence France-Presse that the studio makes embellished dresses rather than solving medical problems, and noting that fashion remains a commercial business. Reporting on the commercial side of upcycling has noted that the practice carries high costs and limits the quantities designers can produce.

== Personal life ==
Germanier lives and works in Paris and dresses in black, reserving color for his designs.
