= Lou-Anne Gleißenebner-Teskey =

Austrian fashion model (born 2003)

Lou-Anne Gleissenebner
- Born: 20 May 2003 (age 22); Monte-Carlo
- Occupation: Model
- Modeling information
- Height: 1.74 m (5 ft 8 1/2 in)
- Hair color: Blonde
- Eye color: Blue
- Agency: Visage Models (Linz); Fashion Model Management (Milan); Berta Models (Barcelona); Models Office (Brussels); Twenty Model Management (Cape Town)

Lou-Anne Gleissenebner (born 20 May 2003) is an Austrian fashion model. She is best known as the winner of the seventeenth season of Germany's Next Topmodel.
