= Alex Mariah Peter =

German model (born 1997)

- Born: 6 November 1997 (age 28); Cologne, Germany
- Modeling information
- Hair color: Black
- Eye color: Brown

Alex Mariah Peter (born 6 November 1997) is a German model who won Germany's Next Topmodel in 2021.

== Personal life ==
Peters is of Korean and South African descent. She is the first transgender model to win Germany's Next Topmodel.
