= David Montgomery (photographer) =

American photographer (born 1937)

- Born: David Montgomery; February 8, 1937 (age 89); Brooklyn, New York, U.S.
- Occupation: Photographer
- Known for: Portrait photography
- Website: [www.davidmontgomery.net]

David Montgomery (born February 8, 1937) is an American photographer known for his portraits of the rich and famous. He studied music at the Juilliard School of Music. He was an assistant to photographer Lester Bookbinder in New York and accompanied him on a working visit to the United Kingdom in the early 1960s and stayed.

== Photograph archive ==
Montgomery's photographic subjects have included Bill Clinton, Lucian Freud, Mick Jagger, Jimi Hendrix, Margaret Thatcher, Peter O'Toole and Andy Warhol. His photographs of Andy Warhol have been included in The Andy Warhol Museum in Pittsburgh. For his photograph of Hendrix, which is shown in the inside cover of the 1968 album Electric Ladyland, Montgomery started a fire using a can of petrol to photograph flames behind Hendrix. He also photographed Queen Elizabeth II in 1967, being the first American to do so, after which he said that he was never frightened of a subject again, going on to photograph five British prime ministers.

== Personal life ==
Montgomery has been married twice. With his first wife, Caroline, he has two daughters, Rebecca Montgomery and Krishna Montgomery. He married his second wife, Martine (née King), in 1982. They have a daughter Marissa Montgomery and a son Max Montgomery, who is also a photographer. He lives with his wife in a five-bedroom Victorian terraced house in Chelsea, London.
