= Vivien Blotzki =

German model (born 2001)

- Born: 2 February 2001 (age 25); Mayen-Koblenz, Germany
- Modeling information
- Height: 1.80 m (5 ft 11 in)
- Hair color: Black
- Eye color: Brown
- Agency: Louisa Models; Stellar Talent Management; Modellink Agency (Göteborg); Dominique Models Agency (Brussels)

Vivien Blotzki is a German model and the winner of the 18th season of Germany's Next Topmodel.

== Personal life ==
Bloztki is of Brazilian descent via her mother. Blotzki was notable for being the first plus-size model to win Germany's Next Topmodel.
