= Miss Universe Germany =

National beauty pageant competition in Germany

Miss Universe Germany Organization
- Formation: 2009; 17 years ago
- Type: Beauty pageant
- Headquarters: Berlin
- Location: Germany
- Members: Miss Universe
- Official language: German
- President: N/A
- Website: missuniversegermany.de

Miss Universe Germany is a national Beauty pageant in Germany to select an official candidate for the Miss Universe pageant.

== History ==
The Miss Germany started in 1952. Miss Universe Germany started in 2009. Currently, the German franchise of Miss Universe is owned by former Miss Universe Germany winner Natalie Ackermann. She is also the franchiser of Miss Universe Colombia in Colombia. In Miss Universe Germany all the States of Germany but also some of the regions are represented as well.

=== 1952-1999 ===
In 1952 Miss Germany started with Renate Hoy as the first winner, who then became 4th Runner-up at Miss Universe. In 1961, Germany has the official winner of Miss Universe 1961, Marlene Schmidt. From 1985 : MGC - Miss Germany Corporation GmbH (Oldenburg), the official winner will be selecting by the organization. In 1991, the MGA (Miss Germany Association, Bergheim near Cologne) of Detlef Tursies run a Miss Germany pageant for the first time. The winners participate in Miss Universe. In 1999, MGA transforms into MGO (Miss Germany Organisation). From 2000, they award the title Miss Deutschland, and change their name again: MGO - Komitee Miss Deutschland. In 1999 is the last of Miss Germany Company sent the candidate for Miss Universe, she is Diana Drubig.

=== 2000-2008 ===
The Miss Deutschland came into being in 2000, inheriting the since 1952 established official winner of Miss Germany pageant, that would compete at the international Miss Universe pageant. On occasion, when the winner does not qualify (due to age) for either contest, a runner-up is sent. After 2008, Miss Germany for Miss Universe selected by Miss Universe Deutschland pageant.

== Titleholders ==
=== Miss Universe Germany ===
- : Declared as Winner
- : Ended as runner-up or top 5/6 qualification
- : Ended as one of the finalists or semifinalists
- : Ended as special awards winner

Year	State	State Election	Miss Universe Germany	Placement at Miss Universe	Special awards	Notes
Kim Kelly Braun directorship — a franchise holder to Miss Universe since 6th March 2025
2026	Hesse	-	Celina Weil	TBA		Previously Miss Deutschland 2024 and 4th runner-up of Miss Intercontinental 2024
2025	Hamburg	-	Diana Fast	Did not compete		She became the first mother to win the Miss Universe Germany title.
Natalie Ackermann directorship — a franchise holder to Miss Universe between 2021 - 2024
2024	North Rhine-Westphalia	Cologne	Pia Theissen	Unplaced		
2023	Baden-Württemberg	Ravensburg	Helena Bleicher	Unplaced		
2022	Saxony	Düsseldorf	Soraya Kohlmann	Unplaced		
2021	North Rhine-Westphalia	Düsseldorf	Hannah Seifer	Unplaced		The 1st Colombian-German Miss Universe Germany History
Kim Kotter directorship — a franchise holder to Miss Universe between 2009―2019
Due to the impact of COVID-19 pandemic, no representative in 2020
2019	Berlin	Munich	Miriam Rautert	Unplaced		
2018	Berlin	Berlin	Celine Willers	Unplaced		
2017	Saxony-Anhalt	Halle	Sophia Koch	Unplaced		
2016	North Rhine-Westphalia	Eschweiler	Johanna Acs	Unplaced		
2015	Bavaria	Berlin	Sarah-Lorraine Riek	Unplaced		
2014	Saxony	Berlin	Josefin Donat	Unplaced	Best National Costume (Top 5)	
2013	Berlin	Berlin	Anne-Julia Hagen	Unplaced		
2012	Norddeutschland	Berlin	Alicia Endemann	Unplaced		
2011	Saxony	Berlin	Valeria Bystritskaia	Unplaced		
2010	Bavaria	Berlin	Kristiana Rohder	Unplaced		
2009	Saxony-Anhalt	Berlin	Martina Lee	Unplaced		

=== Miss Deutschland 2000-2008 ===
- : Declared as Winner
- : Ended as runner-up or top 5/6 qualification
- : Ended as one of the finalists or semifinalists
- : Ended as special awards winner

Year	State	State Election	Miss Deutschland	Placement at Miss Universe	Special awards
Miss Deutschland: MGO – Komitee Miss Deutschland (Bergheim near Cologne) directorship "Miss Universe Deutschland" — a franchise holder to Miss Universe in 2008
2008	Berlin	Berlin	Madina Taher	Unplaced	
Miss Deutschland: MGO – Komitee Miss Deutschland (Bergheim near Cologne) directorship — a franchise holder to Miss Universe between 2000―2007; in 2006 and 2007 there were appointment girls. In 2007 Angelina (a Runner-up of Miss Deutschland 2005) was designated as Miss Germany Universe 2007 and in 2006 Natalie (Miss Nordrhein Westfalen 2006) was designated as Miss Germany Universe 2006.
2007	Berlin	Berlin	Angelina Glass	Unplaced	
2006	North Rhine-Westphalia	Düsseldorf	Natalie Ackermann	Unplaced	Best National Costume (Top 20)
2005	North Rhine-Westphalia	Aachen	Asli Bayram	Unplaced	
2004	Süddeutschland	Duisburg	Shermine Shahrivar	Unplaced	
2003	Bavaria	Bielefeld	Alexandra Vodjanikova	Unplaced	
2002	Hamburg	Kaiserslautern	Natascha Börger	Top 10	
2001	Thuringia	Kaiserslautern	Claudia Bechstein	Unplaced	
2000	Ostdeutschland	Kaiserslautern	Sabrina Schepmann	Unplaced	

=== Miss Germany 1952-1999 ===
- : Declared as Winner
- : Ended as runner-up or top 5/6 qualification
- : Ended as one of the finalists or semifinalists
- : Ended as special awards winner

Year	State	State Election	Miss Germany	Placement at Miss Universe	Special awards
Miss Germany Organisation directorship — a franchise holder to Miss Universe in 1999
1999	Saxony	Trier	Diana Drubig	Unplaced	
Miss Germany Association, Bergheim near Cologne directorship — a franchise holder to Miss Universe between 1991―1998
1998	Rhineland-Palatinate	Trier	Katharina Mainka	Unplaced	
1997	Schleswig-Holstein	Trier	Agathe Neuner	Unplaced	
1996	Brandenburg	Trier	Miriam Ruppert	Unplaced	
1995	Rhineland-Palatinate	Trier	Ilka Endres	Unplaced	
1994	Baden-Württemberg	Chemnitz	Tanja Wild	Unplaced	
1993	Hamburg	Bremen	Verona Feldbusch	Unplaced	
Miss Germany Company directorship — a franchise holder to Miss Universe between 1985―1992
1992	Thuringia	Cottbus	Monika Resch	Unplaced	
1991	Saxony	Berlin	Katrin Richter	Unplaced	
1990	Hesse	Berlin	Christiane Stöcker	Unplaced	Miss Congeniality
1989	Bavaria	Hamburg	Andrea Stelzer	Top 10	
1988	Berlin	Düsseldorf	Christiane Kopp	Unplaced	
1987	North Rhine-Westphalia	Munich	Dagmar Schulz	Unplaced	
1986	Bavaria	Darmstadt	Birgit Jahn	Unplaced	
1985	Baden-Württemberg	Baden-Baden	Angelika Roth	Unplaced	
Miss Germany Corporation (German TV) directorship — a franchise holder to Miss Universe between 1979―1984
1984	North Rhine-Westphalia	Bad Mondorf (Luxembourg)	Brigitte Berx	Top 10	
1983	Mecklenburg-Vorpommern	Badgastein (Austria)	Loana Radecki	Top 12	
1982	Lower Saxony	Palma de Mallorca (Spain)	Kerstin Paeserack	Top 12	
1981	Bavaria	Munich	Marion Kurz	Top 12	
1980	Lower Saxony	Berlin	Kathrin Glotzl	Unplaced	
1979	Berlin	Bremen	Andrea Hontschik	Top 12	
Miss Germany Corporation (German’s Casting) directorship — a franchise holder to Miss Universe between 1979―1984
1978	Brandenburg	Appointed	Maria Gottschalk	Unplaced	
1977	Berlin	Appointed	Marie Gassen	4th Runner-up	
1976	Saxony-Anhalt	Appointed	Birgit Hamer	Unplaced	
1975	Saarland	Appointed	Sigrit Klose	Unplaced	
1974	Mecklenburg-Vorpommern	Appointed	Ursula Faustle	Unplaced	
1973	Bavaria	Baden-Baden	Dagmar Winkler	Unplaced	
1972	Brandenburg	Appointed	Heidi Weber	Top 12	
Miss Germany Corporation (Opal Company) directorship — a franchise holder to Miss Universe between 1952―1971
1971	Bavaria	Appointed	Vera Kists	Unplaced	
1970	Bavaria	San Juan (Puerto Rico)	Irene Neumann	Unplaced	
1969	Bavaria	Munich	Gesine Froese	Unplaced	
1968	Bavaria	Munich	Lilian Atterer	Unplaced	
1967	Schleswig-Holstein	Berlin	Fee von Zitzewitz	Unplaced	
1966	North Rhine-Westphalia	Berlin	Marion Heinrich	Top 15	
1965	North Rhine-Westphalia	Berlin	Ingrid Bethke	Unplaced	Miss Congeniality
1964	Berlin	Berlin	Martina Kettler	Unplaced	
1963	Bavaria	Travemünde	Helga Carla Ziesemer	Top 15	
1962	Hesse	Travemünde	Gisela Karschuck	Unplaced	
1961	Baden-Württemberg	Baden-Baden	Marlene Schmidt	Miss Universe 1961	
1960	Rhineland-Palatinate	Baden-Baden	Ingrun Helgard Moeckel	Top 16	
1959	Berlin	Baden-Baden	Carmela Künzel	Top 16	
1958	Bavaria	Baden-Baden	Marlies Behrens	Top 16	
1957	Hamburg	Baden-Baden	Gerti Daub	4th Runner-up	Miss Photogenic
1956	Berlin	Baden-Baden	Marina Orschel	1st Runner-up	Miss Photogenic
1955	North Rhine-Westphalia	Baden-Baden	Margit Nünke	3rd Runner-up	
1954	Bremen	Baden-Baden	Regina Ernst	3rd Runner-up	
1953	Berlin	Wiesbaden	Christel Schaack*	Top 16	
1952	Rhineland-Palatinate	Baden-Baden	Renate Hoy	4th Runner-up	

=== State rankings ===
State	Title	Year
Berlin	15	1953, 1956, 1959, 1964, 1977, 1979, 1985, 1988, 2006, 2007, 2008, 2013, 2015, 2018, 2019
Bavaria	12	1958, 1963, 1968, 1969, 1970, 1971, 1973, 1981, 1986, 1989, 2003, 2010
North Rhine-Westphalia	9	1955, 1965, 1966, 1984, 1987, 2005, 2016, 2021, 2024
Saxony	5	1991, 1999, 2011, 2014, 2022
Rhineland-Palatinate	4	1952, 1960, 1995, 1998
Baden-Württemberg	3	1961, 1994, 2023
Saxony Anhalt	3	1976, 2009, 2017
Hamburg	3	1957, 1993, 2002
Brandenburg	3	1972, 1978, 1996
Thuringia	2	1992, 2001
Schleswig-Holstein	2	1967, 1997
Hesse	2	1962, 1990
Mecklenburg-Vorpommern	2	1974, 1983
Lower Saxony	2	1980, 1982
Norddeutschland	1	2012
Süddeutschland	1	2004
Ostdeutschland	1	2000
Saarland	1	1975
Bremen	1	1954

== See also ==
- Miss Germany

== Official website ==
- missuniversegermany.de
