= Miriam Rautert =

Miss Universe Germany 2019

- Born: 21 March 1996 (age 30); Port of Spain, Trinidad and Tobago
- Occupations: Model; journalist
- Height: 1.65 m (5 ft 5 in)
- Beauty pageant titleholder
- Title: Miss Universe Germany 2019
- Hair color: Black
- Eye color: Brown
- Major competitions: Miss Universe Germany 2019 (Winner); Miss Universe 2019 (Unplaced)

Miriam Rautert (born 21 March 1996) is a German model and beauty pageant titleholder who was crowned Miss Universe Germany 2019. She represented Germany at the Miss Universe 2019 pageant. In 2021, she became a contestant in Germany's Next Topmodel (season 16).

== Personal life ==
Rautert was born on 21 March 1996 in Port of Spain, Trinidad and Tobago and raised in Hagen, Germany. She has a degree in journalism and corporate communication from a private university in Iserlohn, and moved to Berlin for the sixth semester in 2018. Rautert is the second Miss Universe Germany of mixed ethnicity.

== Pageantry ==
=== Miss Universe Germany 2019 ===
Rautert joined at a major national pageant, this time at the Miss Universe Germany 2019 competition in Berlin on 1 September 2019. She went on to win the competition, beating the runners-up were Christine Annabelle Keller and Alena Krempl. Rautert was crowned by outgoing Miss Universe Germany 2018 Celine Willers.

=== Miss Universe 2019 ===
As Miss Universe Germany, Rautert represented Germany at the Miss Universe 2019 where she did not place.

Awards and achievements
Preceded by Celine Willers	Miss Universe Germany; 2019	Succeeded by Hannah Seifer
