= Celina Weil =

German model and beauty pageant winner

- Celina at the 2026 Cannes Film Festival
- Born: 6 December 2000 (age 25); Frankfurt, Germany
- Height: 176 cm (69 in)
- Beauty pageant titleholder
- Title: Miss Germany 2024; Miss Universe Germany 2026
- Major competitions: Miss Germany 2024; (Winner); Miss Intercontinental; (4th Runner-Up); (Miss Intercontinental Europe); Miss Universe Germany 2024; (Winner); Miss Universe 2026; (TBD)

Celina Weil (born 6 December 2000) is a German model and beauty pageant winner who was crowned Miss Germany 2024.

In 2026, She won Miss Universe Germany 2026 and will represent Germany at Miss Universe 2026 in San Juan, Puerto Rico.

== Early life and career ==
Celina Weil grew up in a village north of Frankfurt and, as of 2024, is studying economics at Goethe University Frankfurt.

As a model, she has walked in international fashion weeks, including New York Fashion Week and Paris Fashion Week. Additionally, various media outlets have reported on her, including Bild, Die Zeit, and RTL News.

== Pageantry ==
In 2023, she participated in the "World Top Model" competition and reached the finals in Monaco. In 2024, she won the Miss Germany competition, and subsequently represented Germany in the Miss Intercontinental competition in Sharm El Sheikh, where she was the highest-ranking European contestant and received the title of "Miss Intercontinental Europe".

=== Accolades ===
- 2024: Miss Germany
- 2024: Miss Intercontinental Europe
- 2026: Miss Universe Germany
