= Gernot Endemann =

German actor (1942–2020)

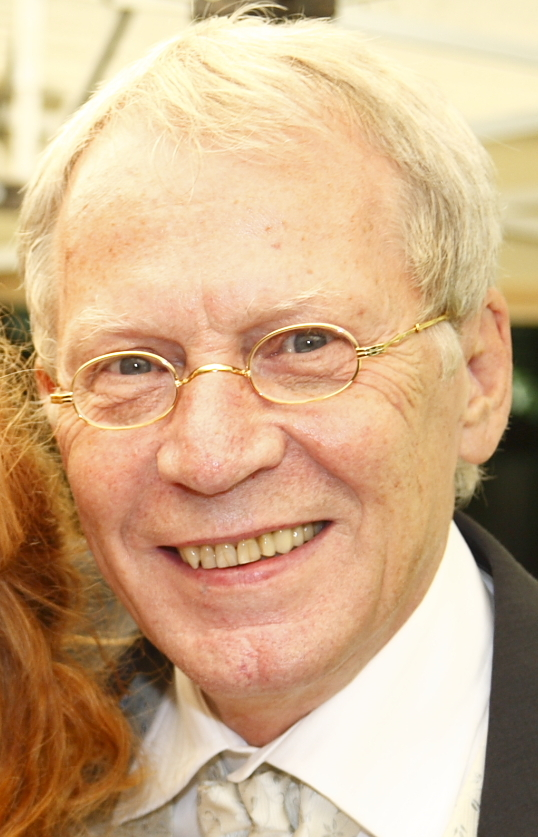
- Endemann in 2010
- Born: 24 June 1942; Essen, Westphalia, Prussia, Germany
- Died: 29 June 2020 (aged 78); Hanover, Lower Saxony, Germany
- Occupation: Actor
- Years active: 1965–2019
- Spouse(s): Reinhild Schneider; Jocelyne Boisseau Sabine Schmidt-Kirchner (after 2009)
- Children: 4, including Alicia

Gernot Endemann (24 June 1942 – 29 June 2020) was a German film and television actor. He was at one time married to the French actress Jocelyne Boisseau.

== Filmography ==
Year	Title	Role	Notes
1969	Herzblatt oder Wie sag ich's meiner Tochter?	Otto	
1969	Angels of the Street	Blinky	
1970	The Sex Nest	Stefan Bornemann alias Columbus	
1970	Under the Roofs of St. Pauli	Herzberg, ein Primaner	
1972	Einmal im Leben – Geschichte eines Eigenheims	Real Estate Broker	TV miniseries
1972	Willi Manages The Whole Thing	Julius Appel	
1976	Shout at the Devil	Braun	
1983	Mandara	Apotheker Timm	12 episodes
1987	Der Schatz im Niemandsland	Harald Friesecke	5 episodes
1999	Long Hello and Short Goodbye	Kommissar / Inspector	
2005	Smile of the Monsterfish	Knottke	
2005	Kometen	Lutz Seppelfricke	

== Bibliography ==
- Ottoson, Robert. American International Pictures: A Filmography. Garland, 1985.
