= Germany's Next Topmodel season 16 =

Model Contest on Television

Germany's Next Topmodel
- Season 16
- Judges: Heidi Klum
- No. of contestants: 31
- Winner: Alex-Mariah Peter
- No. of episodes: 17

Release
- Original network: ProSieben
- Original release: 4 February – 27 May 2021

Season chronology
- ← Previous; Season 15 Next → Season 17

The sixteenth season of Germany's Next Topmodel aired on German television network ProSieben from 4 February to 27 May 2021, under the catch phrase We are GNTM.

The winner of this season was 23-year-old Alex-Mariah Peter from Cologne, who is notably the first trans woman to win Germany's Next Topmodel. Her prizes include:

- A cover and spread in the German edition of Harper's Bazaar.
- A cash prize worth €100,000.
- An Opel Mokka

The following prize have been removed:

- A modeling contract with Günther Klum's OneEins GmbH Management worth €140,000.

Due to the COVID-19 epidemic, the season was filmed under strict COVID-19 regulations, including travel restrictions, resulting in the sixteenth season being the first and only season filmed entirely in Germany. As a result of these restrictions, a preselection was held instead of open castings, and the first episode started with 31 finalists.

== Contestants ==
Ages stated are as of the beginning of the contest

Contestant	Age	Height	Hometown	Finish	Place
Franziska Bergander	24	1.74 m (5 ft 8 1/2 in)	Nürnberg	Episode 1	31-26
Maria-Sophie Damiano	19	1.55 m (5 ft 1 in)	Konstanz	Episode 1	31-26
Vanessa Gros	21	1.83 m (6 ft 0 in)	Munich	Episode 1	31-26
Alexandra Reinke	21	1.75 m (5 ft 9 in)	Köln	Episode 1	31-26
Samantha Herbst	21	1.78 m (5 ft 10 in)	Hamburg	Episode 1	31-26
Lena Schreiber	21	1.73 m (5 ft 8 in)	Main-Spessart	Episode 1	31-26
Ricarda Häschke	21	1.77 m (5 ft 9 1/2 in)	Pinneberg	Episode 2	25 (quit)
Anna-Maria 'Maria' Schimanski	21	1.69 m (5 ft 6 1/2 in)	Flensburg	Episode 2	24
Sara Ullmann	20	1.77 m (5 ft 9 1/2 in)	Aichtal	Episode 3	23 (quit)
Nana Fofana	19	1.80 m (5 ft 11 in)	Hamburg	Episode 3	22
Mira Folster	19	1.77 m (5 ft 9 1/2 in)	Bordesholm	Episode 4	21 (quit)
Sarah Ahrend	22	1.76 m (5 ft 9 1/2 in)	Kaiserslautern	Episode 4	20
Amina Hotait	21	1.73 m (5 ft 8 in)	Berlin	Episode 5	19
Miriam Rautert	25	1.65 m (5 ft 5 in)	Berlin	Episode 6	18
Chanel Silberberg	21	1.72 m (5 ft 7 1/2 in)	Oer-Erkenschwick	Episode 7	17
Jasmine Jüttner	21	1.80 m (5 ft 11 in)	Vienna, Austria	Episode 8	16 (quit)
Alysha Hübner	19	1.68 m (5 ft 6 in)	Berlin	Episode 8	15
Linda Braunberger	20	1.73 m (5 ft 8 in)	Niederelbert	Episode 9	14
Mareike Müller	26	1.80 m (5 ft 11 in)	Halle	Episode 9	13
Romy Wolf	19	1.73 m (5 ft 8 in)	Zittau	Episode 10	12 (quit)
Larissa Onac	22	1.77 m (5 ft 9 1/2 in)	Achim	Episode 11	11
Elisa Schattenberg	20	1.74 m (5 ft 8 1/2 in)	Dortmund	Episode 12	10
Ana Martinovic	20	1.77 m (5 ft 9 1/2 in)	Neu-Ulm	Episode 13	9
Angelina 'Luca' Vanak	19	1.78 m (5 ft 10 in)	Bitterfeld-Wolfen	Episode 14	8
Liliana Maxwell	21	1.79 m (5 ft 10 1/2 in)	Rheda-Wiedenbrück	Episode 15	7
Yasmin Boulaghmal	19	1.80 m (5 ft 11 in)	Braunschweig	Episode 16	6
Ashley Amegan	23	1.76 m (5 ft 9 1/2 in)	Fürstenfeldbruck	Episode 16	5 (quit)
Romina Palm	21	1.68 m (5 ft 6 in)	Köln	Episode 17	4
Soulin Omar	20	1.73 m (5 ft 8 in)	Hamburg	Episode 17	3
Dascha Carriero	21	1.78 m (5 ft 10 in)	Solingen	Episode 17	2
Alex-Mariah Peter	23	1.83 m (6 ft 0 in)	Köln	Episode 17	1

== Episode summaries ==
No. overall	No. in season	Title	Original release date
229	1	"High Fashion in Berlin"	4 February 2021
The season starts with 31 girls arriving in Berlin, where they'll be staying for the duration of the competition. The girls participate in their first fashion show, where they face challenges on the runway. Heidi and guest judge Manfred Thierry Mugler provide feedback. In the end, Franziska, Alexandra, Samantha, Vanessa, and Lena, are the first set of models to be eliminated.: Eliminated: Alexandra Reinke, Franziska Bergander, Lena Schreiber, Maria-Sophie Damiano, Samantha Herbst & Vanessa Gros; Special guests: Thierry Mugler
230	2	"Willkommen im Modelloft!"	11 February 2021
The Top 25 models move into a loft in Berlin, where they face challenges and conflicts. Heidi provides catwalk training, and some models struggle with stiffness and shyness. They participate in a photo shoot and video shoot, where some models shine while others struggle. The models later participate in the elimination walk wearing designs by Marina Hoermanseder. In the end, Heidi eliminates Maria, who struggled with insecurity and posing.: Quit: Ricarda Häschke; Bottom two: Larissa Onac & Maria Schimanski; Eliminated: Maria Schimanski; Featured photographer: Rankin; Special guests: Marina Hoermanseder & Rankin
231	3	"Primaballerina"	18 February 2021
The remaining models participate in a ballet class to prepare for a photo shoot, where some excel while others struggle. The photo shoot involves duels, where the better-performing model advances to the next round. Some models shine, while others face challenges. Meanwhile, Alex comes out as transgender, earning applause from the other models. The models later participate in the elimination walk with a nightmare theme, where some struggle while others impress. In the end, Heidi eliminates Nana, who struggled with posing and walking.: Quit: Sara Ullmann; Immune: Alex-Mariah Peter, Alysha Hübner, Amina Hotait, Ashley Amegan, Chanel Silberberg, Elisa Schattenberg, Larissa Onac, Linda Braunberger, Luca Vanak, Romy Wolf & Soulin Omar; Eliminated: Nana Fofana; Featured photographer: Markus Schäfer; Special guests: Nikeata Thompson
232	4	"Fashion Divas und Roller Girls"	25 February 2021
The models participate in a roller-skate teaching and a photo shoot with dogs, where some excel while others struggle. Soulin impresses with her poses, while Liliana faces challenges due to her fear of dogs. The models later participate in the elimination walk with revealing outfits, where some feel uncomfortable while others shine. In the end, Heidi eliminates Sarah, who struggled with stiffness and lacked creativity.: Quit: Mira Folster; Eliminated: Sarah Ahrend; Featured photographer: Ellen von Unwerth; Special guests: Oumi Janta
233	5	"Das große #GNTM-Umstyling!"	4 March 2021
The models receive makeovers, leading to varying reactions. Some struggle with their new looks, while others shine. The elimination walk that doubles as this week's photo shoot features Christian Cowan's designs, where Soulin stands out for her confidence and power, earning her a frontrunner status that frustrates Linda. In the end, Heidi eliminates Amina, who struggled with her walk and didn't use advice from Christian.: Eliminated: Amina Hotait; Featured photographer: Mato Johannik; Special guests: Christian Cowan & Wendy Iles
234	6	"Sedcard-Shooting"	11 March 2021
For this week, the models first participated in this week's elimination walk as ice queens, where some shine while others face challenges. The week's focus shifts to a Levi's campaign casting, where Soulin stands out for her authenticity and dynamic performance, landing the first job of this season. However, her success sparks controversy and drama among the other models. At the sedcard shoot, some models earn immunity, while others struggle to impress. In the end, Heidi eliminates Miriam, whose modeling style is deemed too robotic and outdated.: Booked for job: Soulin Omar; Immune: Alysha Hübner, Ana Martinovic, Ashley Amegan, Dascha Carriero, Elisa Schattenberg, Luca Vanak, Romy Wolf & Soulin Omar; Bottom four: Jasmine Jüttner, Liliana Maxwell, Linda Braunberger & Miriam Rautert; Eliminated: Miriam Rautert; Featured photographer & special guest: Christian Anwander; Featured client: Levi's
235	7	"Back to the 80's"	18 March 2021
The models participate in a press teaching with Christian Düren, where they face challenging questions and learn to handle difficult situations. Some models, like Soulin and Dascha, impress with their professionalism and confidence, while others struggle with insecurity and attitude. The models later participate in a press conference, where they showcase their improved skills. An 80s-themed commercial shoot follows, where the models have to improvise and sell a product. Some models shine, while others face challenges. After the shoot, the models participate in an emoji-themed elimination walk, where most receive positive feedback. After the walk, Heidi eliminates Chanel, citing her lack of skills and enthusiasm as a model.: Bottom three: Ashley Amegan, Chanel Silberberg & Mareike Müller; Eliminated: Chanel Silberberg; Featured director: David Helmut; Special guests: Christian Düren, Stefanie Giesinger & Marcus Butler
236	8	"Strike A Pose!"	25 March 2021
The remaining models participate in this week's photo shoot in a rotating cube, where they pose in groups and compete for the best photo. Soulin stands out, winning the first group, but faces criticism from Linda, who accuses her of faking emotions for the cameras. The models later receive a dance performance challenge during the elimination walk, where they struggle to master the choreography and convey confidence. At the runway, some models shine, while others face challenges. In the end, Heidi eliminates Alysha, who struggled with her performance and didn't convince in the photo shoot.: Quit: Jasmine Jüttner; Eliminated: Alysha Hübner; Featured photographer: Pamela Hanson; Special guests: Sonia Bartucelli & Valentina Sampaio
237	9	"And Action!"	1 April 2021
The models evaluate themselves, ranking their performances and personalities. Soulin tops the performance list, while Mareike surprisingly ranks highest in personality. The girls then face a challenging photo shoot 122 meters high in the sky, where some struggle with fear and panic. Linda, in particular, has a panic attack and refuses to continue the shoot, instantly being eliminated from the competition. The remaining models participate in an obstacle course elimination walk, where they showcase their modeling skills while navigating challenges. In the end, Heidi eliminates Mareike, citing her consistent struggles with performance.: Eliminated outside of panel: Linda Braunberger; Bottom two: Luca Vanak & Mareike Müller; Eliminated: Mareike Müller; Featured photographer: Rasmus Kaessmann; Special guests: Jochen Schweizer, Katy Bähm & Rebecca Mir
238	10	"Berlin is Calling!"	8 April 2021
The models participate in a video shoot with guest judge Otto Waalkes, where they portray emotions like sadness, anger, and euphoria. Some models struggle to connect with their emotions, while others shine. Romy leaves the competition due to mental health concerns, citing the pressure as too much. The remaining models participate in a casting for the Opel Mokka campaign, where Ashley impresses the clients with her story and presence, winning the campaign. The models later participate in this week's elimination walk with a night club theme, where they successfully showcase their energy and dancing skills. After the walk, Heidi announces a non-elimination round, with Elisa narrowly avoiding elimination due to her strong performance in the live walk.: Quit: Romy Wolf; Booked for job: Ashley Amegan; Eliminated: None; Featured director: Reza Norifarahani; Featured director: Reza Norifarahani; Special guests: Albrecht Schäfer, Esther Perbandt, Marcel Ostertag, & Otto Waalkes; Featured client: Opel
239	11	"Art Edition"	15 April 2021
The models participate in a casting for Bauer, where Ana impresses the clients with her naturalness and easygoing presence, winning the job. Meanwhile, tensions rise between Ashley and Elisa, and later Dascha, over Ashley's comment about Dascha being "vulgar." The models then participate in a photo shoot where they're styled as artistic butterflies, with some struggling to bring the picture to life. At the elimination walk, the girls transform into haute couture artworks, with Soulin delivering the best performance. After the walk, Heidi announces the Top 10, with Soulin being the first girl to make it in. Larissa gets eliminated due to her performance not being strong enough, while Ashley barely makes it into the Top 10 despite struggling with stiffness and being in her comfort zone.: Booked for job: Ana Martinovic; Bottom two: Ashley Amegan & Larissa Onac; Eliminated: Larissa Onac; Featured photographer: Kristian Schuller; Special guests: Miss Fame; Featured client: Bauer Media Group
240	12	"Casting Edition"	22 April 2021
The remaining models participate in a casting marathon, with some booking jobs and others facing rejection. Soulin books her third job, while Dascha books her second job in a row after impressing at a casting for Kilian Kerner's fashion show. Ashley and Soulin receive praise for their performances, while Romina and Luca struggle to find the right balance. Liliana books a job and makes it to the Top 9 despite Heidi's frustration with her inconsistency. In the end, Elisa gets eliminated due to her lack of passion and power, leaving her and her friend Romina emotional.: Booked for job: Alex-Mariah Peter, Dascha Carriero (x2), Liliana Maxwell & Soulin Omar; Eliminated: Elisa Schattenberg; Bill Kaulitz; Special guests: Kilian Kerner; Featured clients: Flaconi, Galvan London, InStyle Germany, Invisibobble & Kilian Kerner
241	13	"Nacktshooting"	29 April 2021
The models participate in a nude photo shoot, where some struggle to find the right balance and others shine. Soulin impresses with her natural sensuality and delivers a powerful message about breaking boundaries, which sparks a discussion with Yasmin about cultural differences. Meanwhile, Romina and Ana seek advice on how to be more relaxed, and Romina later books her first job at a casting for Dyson. At this week's elimination walk, the girls face a huge challenge with a 20m high catwalk and an outfit change, with Dascha and Liliana delivering weaker performances. Yasmin impresses Jochen Schweizer and books her first job, and Romina and Yasmin are among the winners this week. Ana gets eliminated due to her struggles with portraying strength and power, despite her ambition.: Booked for job: Romina Palm & Yasmin Boulaghmal; Bottom three: Ana Martinovic, Dascha Carriero & Liliana Maxwell; Eliminated: Ana Martinovic; Featured photographer: Markus Jans; Special guests: Bill Kaulitz, Jacky Wruck, Jochen Schweizer & Tom Kaulitz; Featured clients: Dyson & Jochen Schweizer
242	14	"It's Fashion Week!"	29 April 2021
The models participate another casting marathon, with some booking jobs and others facing rejection. Romina books her second job, and Dascha and Soulin each book their third job. Liliana also books her second job after impressing at the Nylon casting despite some mistakes. At the About You fashion show, the girls get to walk and Lena Gercke chooses Alex to walk for her own brand LeGer, booking Alex's second job. Luca gets eliminated due to still not having any jobs, despite her positive attitude, and the other girls are emotional about losing her.: Booked for job: Alex-Mariah Peter, Dascha Carriero, Liliana Maxwell, Romina Palm & Soulin Omar; Bottom two: Ashley Amegan & Luca Vanak; Eliminated: Luca Vanak; Special guests: Kilian Kerner & Loredana; Featured clients: Andmetics, Elias Rumelis, Lala Berlin, Lena Gercke, & Nylon Germany
243	15	"Boys Edition"	13 May 2021
The remaining models learn a contemporary dance performance and participate in an ice-themed photo shoot. Soulin impresses with her ambition and use of time, while Alex proves her potential despite initial hesitation. Romina gets praise for her imagination and determination, and Dascha brings great energy to the shoot. At the elimination walk, Alex and Soulin shine, while Liliana fails to reach the semifinals and gets eliminated due to her struggles with control and commitment.: Booked for job: Soulin Omar; Eliminated: Liliana Maxwell; Featured photographer: Max Montgomery; Special guests: Magic Mike Live crew; Featured client: Wolfgang Joop
244	16	"Halbfinale"	20 May 2021
The semifinalists participate in the highly-anticipated cover shoot for Harper's Bazaar, with some struggling initially but improving over time. Soulin and Alex shine in their performances, and both are announced as the first two finalists. Ashley and Romina also impress with their speeches and runway performances, and they join Soulin and Alex in the finale. Yasmin's walk lacks attitude, and Dascha's dress mishap on the runway is notable, but Dascha's overall performance earns her a spot in the finale. Yasmin misses the Top 5 and get eliminated due to lacking variety in her performances. Ashley decides to quit for personal reasons, making it a Top 4 finale.: Eliminated: Yasmin Boulaghmal; Quit: Ashley Amegan; Featured photographer: Marcin Tyszka; Special guests: Alessandra Ambrosio & Kerstin Schneider
245	17	"Das große Finale"	27 May 2021
The Top 4 finalists, Romina, Soulin, Dascha, and Alex, walk the runway in superhero costumes and perform various challenges. Romina is eliminated first, followed by Soulin in third place. Dascha and Alex advance to the Top 2, competing in a flower walk, live music video shoot, and final walk. In the end, Alex is announced as the sixteenth winner of Germany's Next Topmodel, praised for her gracefulness, calmness, and ability to overcome obstacles.: Final four: Alex-Mariah Peter, Dascha Carriero, Romina Palm & Soulin Omar; Bottom two: Dascha Carriero & Romina Palm; Eliminated: Romina Palm; Final three: Alex-Mariah Peter, Dascha Carriero & Soulin Omar; Bottom two: Alex-Mariah Peter & Soulin Omar; Eliminated: Soulin Omar; Personality Award: Liliana Maxwell; Final two: Alex-Mariah Peter & Dascha Carriero; Germany's Next Topmodel: Alex-Mariah Peter; Special guests: Nikeata Thompson, Tokio Hotel, VIZE & Zoe Wees

== Summaries ==
=== Results table ===
Place	Model	Episodes																		
Place	Model	1	2 (Note: In Episode 2, Ricarda decided to quit the competition.)	3 (Note: In Episode 3, the ten models who won their respective duels during the photo shoot, were granted immunity from elimination. Furthermore, Sara decided to quit the competition.)	4 (Note: In Episode 4, Mira decided to quit the competition.)	5	6 (Note: In Episode 6, Alysha, Ana, Ashley, Dascha, Elisa, Larissa, Linda, Luca, Romy, & Soulin were granted immunity from elimination.)	7 (Note: In Episode 7, Jasmine was absent because she felt sick, and was therefore taken to the hospital.)	8 (Note: In Episode 8, Jasmine decided to quit the competition.)	9 (Note: In episode 9, Linda was eliminated outside of panel after refusing to participate in the photo shoot.)	10 (Note: In Episode 10, Romy decided to quit the competition, which resulted in a non-elimination.)	11	12	13	14 (Note: In Episode 14, there was no official shoot outside of the go-sees marathon.)	15	16 (Note: In Episode 16, Ashley decided to quit the competition—making Alex, Dascha, Romina and Soulin the finalists.)	17		
1	Alex-Mariah	SAFE	SAFE	IMM	SAFE	SAFE	SAFE	SAFE	SAFE	SAFE	SAFE	SAFE	SAFE	SAFE	SAFE	SAFE	SAFE	SAFE	LOW	WIN
2	Dascha	SAFE	SAFE	SAFE	SAFE	SAFE	IMM	SAFE	SAFE	SAFE	SAFE	SAFE	SAFE	LOW	SAFE	SAFE	SAFE	LOW	SAFE	OUT
3	Soulin	SAFE	SAFE	IMM	SAFE	SAFE	IMM	SAFE	SAFE	SAFE	SAFE	SAFE	SAFE	SAFE	SAFE	SAFE	SAFE	SAFE	OUT	
4	Romina	SAFE	SAFE	SAFE	SAFE	SAFE	SAFE	SAFE	SAFE	SAFE	SAFE	SAFE	SAFE	SAFE	SAFE	SAFE	SAFE	OUT		
5	Ashley	SAFE	SAFE	IMM	SAFE	SAFE	IMM	LOW	SAFE	SAFE	SAFE	LOW	SAFE	SAFE	LOW	LOW	QUIT			
6	Yasmin	SAFE	SAFE	SAFE	SAFE	SAFE	SAFE	SAFE	SAFE	SAFE	SAFE	SAFE	SAFE	SAFE	SAFE	SAFE	OUT			
7	Liliana	SAFE	SAFE	SAFE	SAFE	SAFE	LOW	SAFE	SAFE	SAFE	SAFE	SAFE	SAFE	LOW	SAFE	OUT				
8	Luca	SAFE	SAFE	IMM	SAFE	SAFE	IMM	SAFE	SAFE	LOW	SAFE	SAFE	SAFE	SAFE	OUT					
9	Ana	SAFE	SAFE	SAFE	SAFE	SAFE	IMM	SAFE	SAFE	SAFE	SAFE	SAFE	SAFE	OUT						
10	Elisa	SAFE	SAFE	IMM	SAFE	SAFE	IMM	SAFE	SAFE	SAFE	SAFE	SAFE	OUT							
11	Larissa	SAFE	LOW	IMM	SAFE	SAFE	SAFE	SAFE	SAFE	SAFE	SAFE	OUT								
12	Romy	SAFE	SAFE	IMM	SAFE	SAFE	IMM	SAFE	SAFE	SAFE	QUIT									
13	Mareike	SAFE	SAFE	SAFE	SAFE	SAFE	SAFE	LOW	SAFE	OUT										
14	Linda	SAFE	SAFE	IMM	SAFE	SAFE	LOW	SAFE	SAFE	OUT										
15	Alysha	SAFE	SAFE	IMM	SAFE	SAFE	IMM	SAFE	OUT											
16	Jasmine	SAFE	SAFE	SAFE	SAFE	SAFE	LOW	—N/a	QUIT											
17	Chanel	SAFE	SAFE	IMM	SAFE	SAFE	SAFE	OUT												
18	Miriam	SAFE	SAFE	SAFE	SAFE	SAFE	OUT													
19	Amina	SAFE	SAFE	IMM	SAFE	OUT														
20	Sarah	SAFE	SAFE	SAFE	OUT															
21	Mira	SAFE	SAFE	SAFE	QUIT															
22	Nana	SAFE	SAFE	OUT																
23	Sara	SAFE	SAFE	QUIT																
24	Maria	SAFE	OUT																	
25	Ricarda	SAFE	QUIT																	
26-31	Alexandra	OUT																		
26-31	Franziska	OUT																		
26-31	Lena	OUT																		
26-31	Maria-Sophie	OUT																		
26-31	Samantha	OUT																		
26-31	Vanessa	OUT																		

The contestant withdrew from the competition
The contestant was eliminated
The contestant was eliminated outside of the judging panel
The contestant was in danger of elimination
The contestant won the competition

=== Photo shoot guide ===
- Episode 2 photo shoot and video shoot: Promo shoot in groups and opening credits with Heidi Klum
- Episode 3 photo shoot: Ballet dancers in pairs
- Episode 4 photo shoot: Luxurious women in front of a hotel with dogs
- Episode 5 photo shoot: Posing at the end of the runway in Christian Cowan gowns
- Episode 6 photo shoot: Sedcard
- Episode 7 video shoot: 80's themed television spots
- Episode 8 photo shoot: Posing in a large, vertical, rotating square in groups of four
- Episode 9 photo shoot: Fairies at a height of 122 meters
- Episode 10 video shoot: Emotions with Otto Waalkes
- Episode 11 photo shoot: Artistic butterflies in an abandoned ruin
- Episode 12 photo shoot: Polaroid test shots
- Episode 13 photo shoot: Composite nude shots
- Episode 15 photo shoot: Ice queens with the Magic Mike Crew
- Episode 16 photo shoot: Harper's Bazaar cover
- Episode 17 music video: Behind Blue Eyes by Tokio Hotel & VIZE

== Controversies and criticism ==
Throughout the season, six contestants quit the competition, breaking the record for most voluntary exits in the history of Germany's Next Topmodel. Most of them stated that during filming, they were feeling mentally and physically exhausted.

Contestant Ashley Amegan stated that the production team had bullied her into changing her personality for the show. That's why she left the show even though she made it to the live finale.
