= Jocelyne Boisseau =

French actress

- Born: 7 December 1953 (age 72); Paris, France
- Occupation: Actress
- Years active: 1974–present
- Spouse: Gernot Endemann
- Children: Marine Endemann; Alicia Endemann

Jocelyne Boisseau is a French film and television actress. She was married at one time to the German actor Gernot Endemann.

== Selected filmography ==
- Au plaisir de Dieu (1977, TV miniseries)
- Perceval (1978)
- Pour tout l'or du Transvaal (1979, TV miniseries)
- Henry V in the BBC Television Shakespeare series, as Katherine
- Randale (1983)
- Der Schatz im Niemandsland (1987, TV miniseries)
- Moselbrück (1987–1993, TV series)

== Bibliography ==
- Ewert, Kevin. Henry V: A Guide to the Text and Its Theatrical Life. Palgrave Macmillan, 2006.
