= Sarah-Lorraine Riek =

German model and beauty pageant titleholder

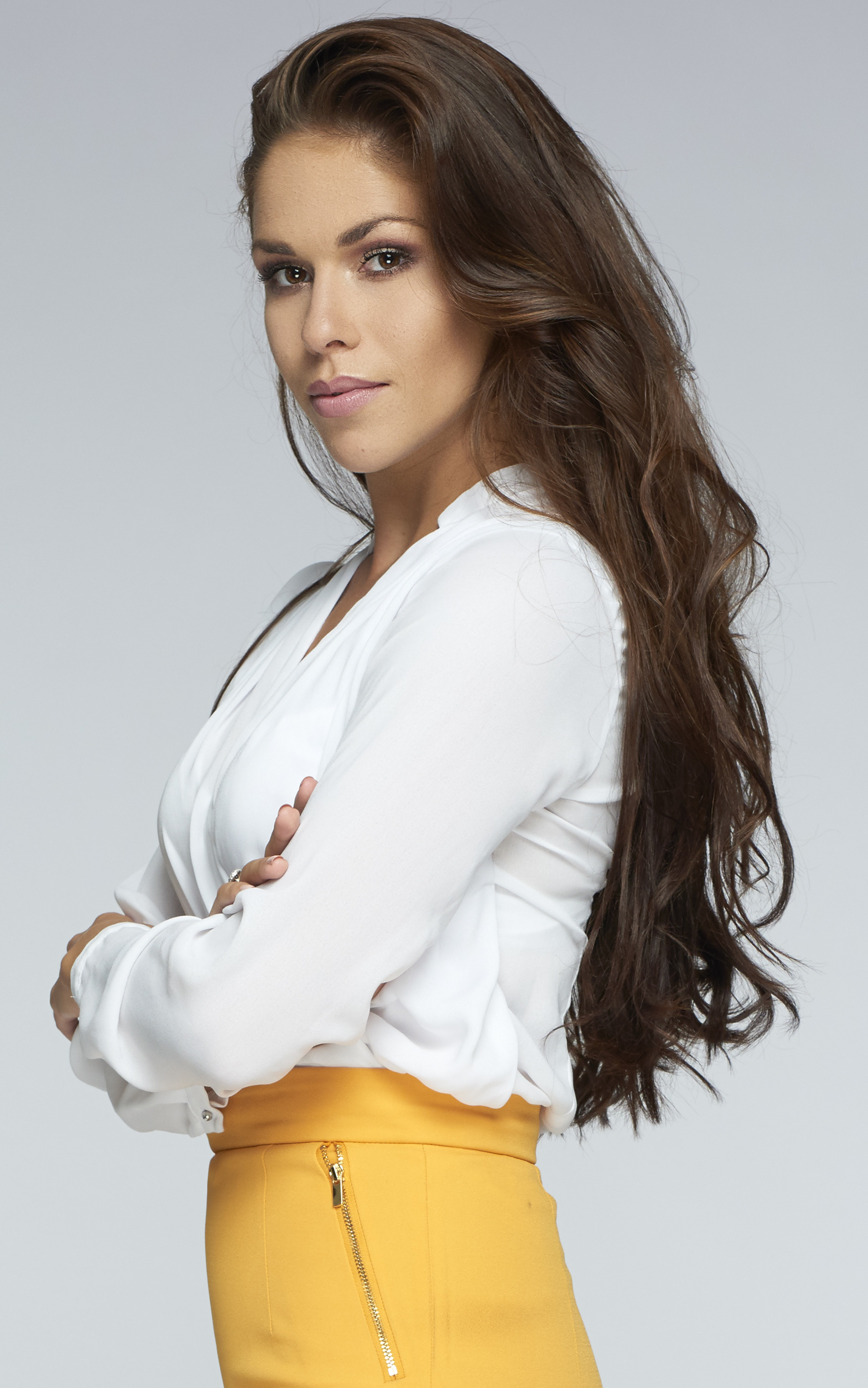
- Born: Sarah-Lorraine Riek; 15 November 1992 (age 33); Heidenheim, Germany
- Occupation: Model
- Height: 1.72 m (5 ft 8 in)
- Beauty pageant titleholder
- Title: Miss Bavaria 2012; Miss Germany Universe 2015
- Hair color: Dark brown
- Eye color: Hazel
- Major competitions: Miss Deutschland 2012 (3rd Runner up); Miss Germany Universe 2015 (Winner); Miss Universe 2015 (Unplaced)

Sarah-Lorraine Kessel (born 15 November 1992 as Sarah-Lorraine Riek) is a German model and beauty pageant titleholder who was crowned Miss Universe Germany 2015 and represented Germany at the Miss Universe 2015 pageant.

== Career ==
Sarah-Lorraine Riek was born in Heidenheim on 15 November 1992. She grew up in South Korea, Malaysia, Sweden and the US before her family moved to a small Bavarian village called Syrgenstein in 2001.

In 2012 Riek was crowned Miss Bavaria and competed in the Miss Germany pageant in Halle. She was awarded Miss Internet by the Miss Germany Organization.

During her reign as Miss Bavaria she worked as an ambassador and founder of an awareness and prevention project for cervical cancer in cooperation with the Euromed clinic in Fürth.

On 11 October 2015 Riek was crowned Miss Germany Universe 2015 at the DorMero Hotel in Bonn. As Miss Germany, she competed at the Miss Universe 2015 pageant held at Planet Hollywood Las Vegas on 20 December 2015.

Riek holds a degree in business and law and aspires to be a lawyer for human rights.

In 2018 Kessel married the German soccer player Benjamin Kessel.

Awards and achievements
Preceded by Josefin Donat	Miss Universe Germany; 2015	Succeeded by Johanna Acs
