= Miss Universe Germany 2009 =

- Date: July 5, 2009
- Venue: Hotel Park-Inn, Dortmund, Germany
- Broadcaster: ARD
- Entrants: 7
- Winner: Martina Lee; Saxony Anhalt

The Miss Universe Germany 2009 pageant was held on July 5, 2009. This year only 7 candidates were competing for the national crown. Each delegate represents a states and regions of the country. The chosen winner will represent Germany at the Miss Universe 2009. The winner of best national costume, the costume will be use in Miss Universe 2009.

== Final results ==
Final results	Contestant
Miss Universe Germany 2009	Saxony Anhalt - Martina Lee
1st Runner-up	Norddeutschland - Valeria Bystritskaia
2nd Runner-up	Bavaria - Lara Waltemode

== Official Delegates ==
Represent	Contestant	Age	Height (ft.)	Height (mtr.)	Hometown
Bavaria	Lara Waltemode	17	5'5"	1.70	Munich
Berlin	Catrina Homova	18	5'9"	1.75	Berlin
Mitteldeutschland	Ulrike Wolful	22	6'0"	1.83	Berlin
Norddeutschland	Valeria Bystritskaia	22	5'9"	1.76	Karlsruhe
North Rhine Westphalia	Valora Roucek	19	5'5"	1.64	Cologne
Saxony Anhalt	Martina Lee	24	5'8"	1.74	Meinerzhagen
Thuringia	Susanna Yurash	20	5'11"	1.81	Erfurt
