= Svetlana Tsys =

Miss Germany 2007

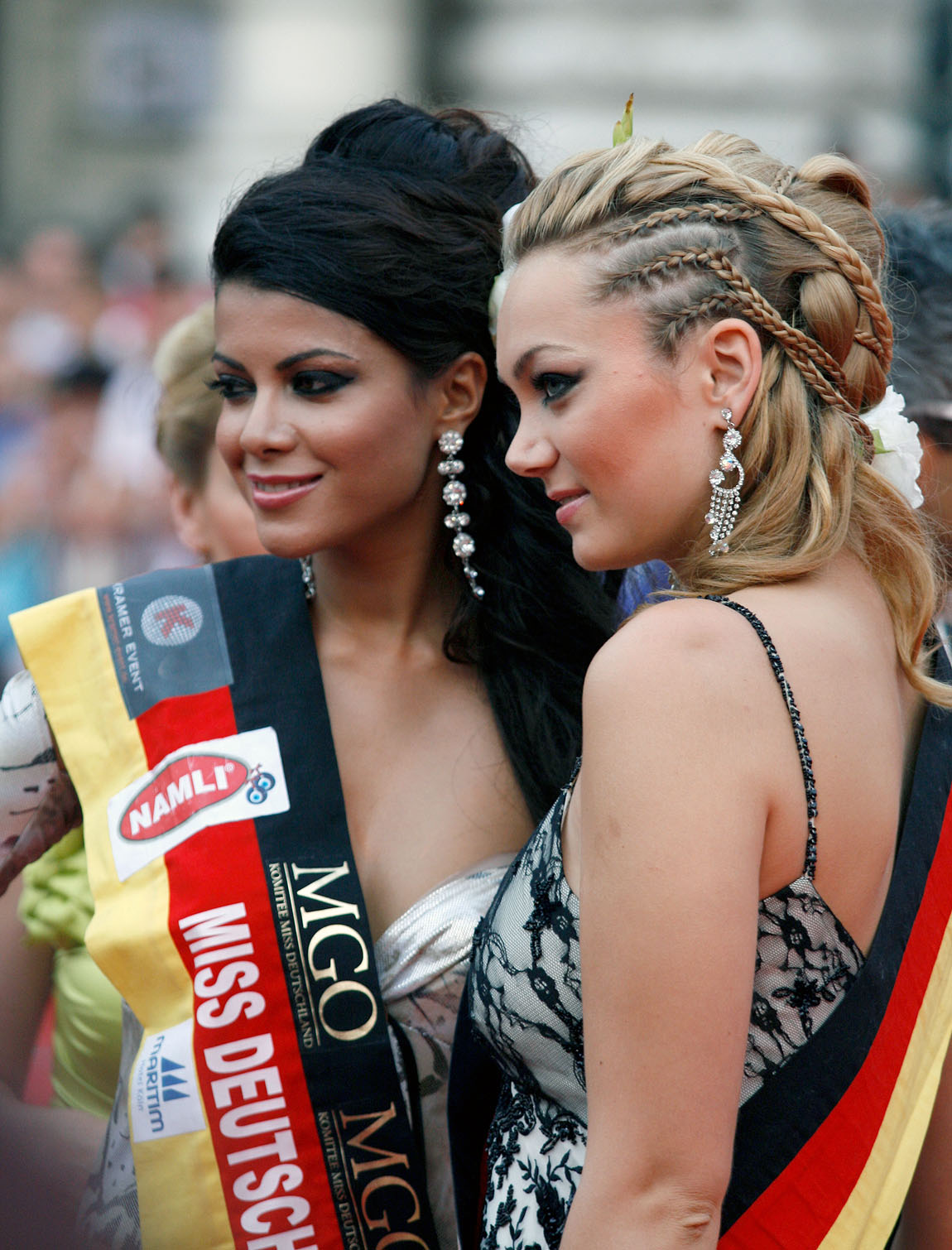
- Zallascht Sadat and Svetlana Tsys on the red carpet of the Life Ball 2010
- Born: Svetlana Tsys; 1988 (age 37–38); Stavropol, Russian SFSR, Soviet Union
- Height: 1.80 m (5 ft 11 in)
- Beauty pageant titleholder
- Title: Miss Germany 2007
- Hair color: Blonde
- Eye color: Green
- Major competitions: Miss Berlin 2003 (Dethroned); Miss Germany 2007 (Winner); Miss International 2007 (Unplaced); World Miss University 2008 (Unplaced)

Svetlana Tsys (Russian: Светлана Цыс; born 1988) is a German model and beauty pageant titleholder who was crowned Miss Germany 2007.

== Early life ==
Svetlana Tsys is the daughter of German Russian parents. She speaks German, English, and Russian.

== Pageant experiences ==
=== Miss Berlin 2003 ===
Svetlana Tsys was crowned as Miss Berlin at the age of 14 years. She had to return the crown at the time when it was found that she had not yet reached the compulsory minimum age of 16.

=== Miss Germany 2007 ===
Svetlana Tsys was crowned as Miss Germany 2007 in Hurghada on 26 January 2007.

Awards and achievements
Preceded by Daniela Domröse	Miss Germany; 2007	Succeeded by Janice Behrendt
