= Helena Bleicher =

German beauty queen

- Born: 25 December 1998 (age 27); Ravensburg, Germany
- Occupation: Model
- Height: 1.84 m (6 ft 1/2 in)
- Beauty pageant titleholder
- Title: Miss Universe Germany 2023
- Major competitions: Miss Universe Germany 2023 (Winner); Miss Universe 2023 (Unplaced)

Helena Bleicher (born 25 December 1998) is a German model and beauty pageant titleholder who was crowned Miss Universe Germany 2023 and represented her country at Miss Universe 2023.

== Pageantry ==
=== Miss Universe 2023 ===
Bleicher represented Germany at the 72nd Miss Universe competition held in El Salvador on 18 November 2023.

Awards and achievements
Preceded by Soraya Kohlmann	Miss Universe Germany; 2023	Succeeded by Pia Theissen
