= Apameh Schönauer =

German-Iranian beauty queen who was crowned Miss Germany 2024

- آپامه شوناور
- Born: 4 July 1984 (age 42); Tehran, Iran
- Children: 2

Apameh Schönauer (Persian: آپامه شوناور, born July 4, 1984, Tehran) is a German-Iranian architect who was crowned Miss Germany 2024. She is married and has two children.

Her selection caused some controversy since the competition eliminated the age limit this year, and she was 39 at that time. Further compounding this was that Schönauer was not an ethnic German, in a competition centered around the beauty of German women. The Miss Germany competition was heavily revamped starting with the 2020 competition, and is no longer based primarily on appearance, but also on character, accomplishments, creativity, and life experiences. Furthermore, she had worked in the same coworking space as the organiser and allegedly had completed a design work for the semi-final round.
