= Susanne Erichsen =

German model and entrepreneur (1925–2002)

Susanne Erichsen (born Susanne Firle; 30 December 1925 in Berlin-Steglitz – 13 January 2002 in Berlin) was a German beauty queen, model and entrepreneur.

== Soviet forced labor ==
While working in a film studio in Potsdam, then in the Soviet zone of occupation, on 15 June 1945 she married a Norwegian engineer Sven Erichsen. The Soviets promised to move them to Norway via Moscow, but instead the couple was sent to Stalinogorsk for forced labor to rebuild the town. After five months, her husband was returned to Norway, and she never saw him again. Susanne Erichsen did two years of hard labor, including work in a coal mine in Siberia. She was not sent home to Berlin until 1947, when, due to starvation and abuse, she was too sick to be of further use.

== Fashion and modelling career ==
Back in Germany, she was discovered by a female fashion journalist and worked in the following years as a model and photo model. While vacationing on the island of Sylt in the early summer of 1950 she took part in Miss Schleswig-Holstein beauty contest, and won.

On 2 September 1950 she was crowned Miss Germany at the Kurhaus of Baden-Baden. Berlin fashion designers such as Heinz Oestergard and Gehringer & GLUPP participated. The award ceremony was almost a scandal; five of the seven judges protested because the fact Erichsen had been married once before violated the rules. However, because Erichsen's marriage had been officially annulled after a few months, she went on to win. Five days later, on September 9, she participated in the Miss Europe pageant at Rimini.

In 1952, she traveled as an "Ambassador of German Fashion" in the United States. Life magazine devoted a three-page article to Erichsen. At the New York agency Frances Gill models of her caliber received nearly 100 dollars an hour (then 420 dollars), more than half as much as German industrial workers in a month.

After her stay in the USA, Erichsen started to design her own fashions. She founded the Susanne Erichsen GmbH teen models, with a retail space on the Kurfürstendamm and production facilities in Berlin-Tempelhof. She is credited with having introduced the concept of the 'teenager' into the German vernacular.

In 1967, she founded in Berlin a mannequin and model school, which she headed for many years.

== Death ==
In early 2002 Erichsen died of a stroke while in a nursing home. Her autobiography (Ein Nerz und eine Krone. Die Lebenserinnerungen des deutschen Fräuleinwunders (Note: The term "Fräuleinwunder" was coined by the Munich reporter of Time Magazine Franz Spelman in reference to Erichsen and the term caught up in the United States.), 2003) was completed by a co-author and editor, Dorothée Hansen.
