= Germany's Next Topmodel season 15 =

Germany's Next Topmodel
- Season 15
- Judges: Heidi Klum
- No. of contestants: 28
- Winner: Jacqueline Wruck
- No. of episodes: 17

Release
- Original network: ProSieben
- Original release: 30 January – 21 May 2020

Season chronology
- ← Previous; Season 14 Next → Season 16

The fifteenth season of Germany's Next Topmodel aired on German television network ProSieben from 30 January to 21 May 2020, under the catch phrase Get ready for GRL Power.

The winner of this season was 21-year-old Jacqueline Wruck from Kiedrich. Her prizes include

- A modeling contract with Günther Klum's OneEins GmbH Management worth €140,000.
- A cover and spread in the German edition of Harper's Bazaar.
- An advertising campaign for Philipp Plein's parfum.
- A cash prize worth €100,000.

The international destinations of this season were set in Santa Cruz, Los Angeles, New York City, London, Milan, Paris, Montego Bay and Ocho Rios.

Due to the COVID-19 epidemic in Germany, the live finale aired without a live studio audience. Furthermore, Heidi Klum joined from Los Angeles via video link due to international travel restrictions. Christian Anwander hosted the finals.

== Contestants ==
(ages stated are at start of contest)

Contestant	Age	Height	Hometown	Finish	Place
Daria Cupachin	22	1.75 m (5 ft 9 in)	Seevetal	Episode 2	28-26
Charlotte Steinborn	23	1.75 m (5 ft 9 in)	München	Episode 2	28-26
Nina-Sue Wurm	19	1.76 m (5 ft 9 1/2 in)	Dießen am Ammersee	Episode 2	28-26
Saskia Mächler (Note: Saskia previously competed in the twelfth season of the series, where she placed twenty-eighth to twenty-seventh.)	22	1.73 m (5 ft 8 in)	Braunschweig	Episode 3	25-24
Malin Blumenthal	21	1.78 m (5 ft 10 in)	Berlin	Episode 3	25-24
Alina Enders	23	1.73 m (5 ft 8 in)	Köln	Episode 4	23-21
Valeria Zock	19	1.77 m (5 ft 9 1/2 in)	Freiburg im Breisgau	Episode 4	23-21
Laura Schäfer	19	1.74 m (5 ft 8 1/2 in)	Düsseldorf	Episode 4	23-21
Cassandra Feliciano	27	1.73 m (5 ft 8 in)	Gera	Episode 6	20-19
Marie Rathay	19	1.73 m (5 ft 8 in)	Landau in der Pfalz	Episode 6	20-19
Pinar Aygün	22	1.84 m (6 ft 1/2 in)	Mühlacker	Episode 6	18-17
Sarah Sonko	23	1.76 m (5 ft 9 1/2 in)	Köln	Episode 6	18-17
Lucy Hellenbrecht	21	1.74 m (5 ft 8 1/2 in)	Kassel	Episode 7	16
Mareike Lerch	24	1.78 m (5 ft 10 in)	Berlin	Episode 8	15 (quit)
Julia Figueroa	20	1.70 m (5 ft 7 in)	Schweinfurt	Episode 8	14
Johanna Höpfler	20	1.80 m (5 ft 11 in)	Remseck	Episode 9	13
Bianca Eigenfeld	18	1.78 m (5 ft 10 in)	Aachen	Episode 10	12
Julia Przybylski	17	1.84 m (6 ft 1/2 in)	Dortmund	Episode 11	11
Nadine Wimmer	20	1.72 m (5 ft 7 1/2 in)	Fürstenfeldbruck	Episode 12	10
Vivian Cole	21	1.83 m (6 ft 0 in)	München	Episode 13	9
Maribel Sancia Todt	18	1.75 m (5 ft 9 in)	Mülheim an der Ruhr	Episode 14	8
Larissa Neumann	19	1.76 m (5 ft 9 1/2 in)	Mörfelden-Walldorf	Episode 15	7
Tamara Hitz	19	1.75 m (5 ft 9 in)	Vienna, Austria	Episode 16	6
Anastasia 'Nastya' Borisova	20	1.73 m (5 ft 8 in)	Berlin	Episode 16	5
Lijana Kaggwa	23	1.79 m (5 ft 10 1/2 in)	Kassel	Episode 17	4 (quit)
Maureen Ugodi	20	1.70 m (5 ft 7 in)	Vienna, Austria	Episode 17	3
Sarah Posch	20	1.75 m (5 ft 9 in)	Vorau, Austria	Episode 17	2
Jacqueline 'Jacky' Wruck	21	1.74 m (5 ft 8 1/2 in)	Kiedrich	Episode 17	1

== Episode summaries ==
No. overall	No. in season	Title	Original release date
212	1	"Mädchen, Models, München!"	30 January 2020
The new season began with a big casting. Then, the girls had to do a fashion show in Julien MacDonald gowns. The girls got tips and help from star guest Milla Jovovich. After that, 25 girls were chosen by Heidi Klum to be part in the fifteenth cycle of Germany's Next Topmodel.: Special guests: Julien MacDonald & Milla Jovovich
213	2	"Welcome to the Jungle!"	6 February 2020
The girls arrived in Costa Rica. There, they had their first big photoshoot with fashion photographer Rankin. Before the shoot, Heidi announced that 3 girls would get a chance to join the competition: Jacky, Maribel and Valeria. At the shoot, the girls had to pose in the jungle in groups with a male model. On the next day, the girls had a quick catwalk teaching with model Stella Maxwell. At elimination, Charlotte, Daria and Nina-Sue were eliminated.: Wildcard: Jacky Wruck, Maribel Sancia Todt & Valeria Zock; Eliminated: Charlotte Steinborn, Daria Cupachin & Nina-Sue Wurm; Featured photographer: Rankin; Special guest: Stella Maxwell
214	3	"Das Nacktshooting"	13 February 2020
The week started with a catwalk training with Heidi. After that, the girls had their next big photoshoot. The girls had to pose nude on the beach with a horse. On the next day, four of the girls (Lucy, Malin, Tamara & Valeria) had a quick catwalk teaching with model Joan Smalls. At elimination, Malin and Saskia were eliminated.: Eliminated: Malin Blumenthal & Saskia Mächler; Featured photographer: Vicky Lawton; Special guest: Joan Smalls
215	4	"Time For Action!"	20 February 2020
The week started with a stunt teaching before their next big photoshoot. The girls had an action shoot. They had to jump while posing as action stars. Then, the girls had a workout on the beach. On the next day, the girls had to walk in outfits from The Blonds. At elimination, Alina, Laura and Valeria were eliminated.: Eliminated: Alina Enders, Laura Schäfer & Valeria Zock; Featured photographer: Max Montgomery; Special guests: The Blonds
216	5	"Umstyling"	27 February 2020
The girls arrived in Los Angeles and moved into their model loft. This week was the big makeover. After that, the girls had their sedcard photoshoot. At elimination, it was announced that Heidi couldn't participate at the elimination because she had a parasite. Cassandra, Johanna, Maribel, Marie and Tamara landed in the bottom five but were saved, because Heidi was absent.: Bottom five: Cassandra Feliciano, Johanna Höpfler, Maribel Sancia Todt, Marie Rathay & Tamara Hitz; Eliminated: None; Featured photographer: Christian Anwander; Special guest: Wendy Iles
217	6	"Das große Krabbeln"	5 March 2020
The 6th week started with a catwalk training. Anastasia, Jacky and Lijana were invited for a casting for the German InStyle. Anastasia was booked for the job. Then, the girls had their next photoshoot. They had to pose in a cave with tarantulas, scorpions or cockroaches. After the shoot, Cassandra and Marie were eliminated. At elimination, the girls had to walk in gowns from the designer Peter Dundas. In the end, Pinar and Sarah S. were eliminated.: Booked for job: Anastasia Borisova; Shoot-out: Cassandra Feliciano, Johanna Höpfler, Maribel Sancia Todt, Marie Rathay & Tamara Hitz; Eliminated outside of panel: Cassandra Feliciano & Marie Rathay; Eliminated: Pinar Aygün & Sarah Sonko; Featured photographer: Lado Alexi; Special guest: Peter Dundas; Featured client: InStyle Germany
218	7	"Everybody comes to Hollywood!"	12 March 2020
This week started with a photoshoot. The girls had to portray Marilyn Monroe while posing in a box. On the next day, the girls had an interview challenge. Anastasia, Maribel and Sarah P. struggled the most while Julia P., Tamara and Vivian were declared the winners of the challenge. At elimination, Lucy was eliminated.: Challenge winner: Julia Przybylski, Tamara Hitz & Vivian Cole; Eliminated: Lucy Hellenbrecht; Featured photographer: Yu Tsai; Special guest: Alessandra Ambrosio
219	8	"Catwalk-Time!"	19 March 2020
The week started with a casting for got2b. Tamara was booked for the job. Later, the girls flew to Berlin for Berlin Fashion Week. There, the girls went to 5 different castings. Anastasia, Johanna, Lijana, Maureen and Sarah P. were booked for a job. After this, Mareike decided to quit the competition. At elimination, the girls had to walk in a fashion show in Christian Cowan's designs while posing at the end of the runway for a photoshoot. Julia F. and Maribel landed in the bottom two. In the end, Julia F. was eliminated.: Quit: Mareike Lerch; Booked for job: Anastasia Borisova (2x), Johanna Höpfler, Lijana Kaggwa, Maureen Ugodi, Sarah Posch & Tamara Hitz; Bottom two: Julia Figueroa & Maribel Sancia Todt; Eliminated: Julia Figueroa; Featured photographer: Robert Erdman; Special guest: Christian Cowan & Nikeata Thompson; Featured clients: Anja Gockel, Got2b, Kilian Kerner, Levi's, Marcel Ostertag, & Wolfgang Joop
220	9	"Color Splash"	26 March 2020
The girls moved into their model mansion. After that, the girls had a dance teaching. On their next photoshoot, the girls had to pose in groups while being splashed with colored powder. At elimination, the girls had to perform their dance in groups while musician Ava Max sang. Johanna and Maribel landed in the bottom two. In the end, Johanna was eliminated.: Bottom two: Johanna Höpfler & Maribel Sancia Todt; Eliminated: Johanna Höpfler; Featured photographer: Kristian Schuller; Special guests: Ava Max & Kristian Schuller
221	10	"Wild Wild West"	2 April 2020
The week started with another stunt teaching. That week the girls had a video shoot. The girls had to portray cowgirls while acting out a fighting scene. At elimination, the girls had to walk in gowns from designer Jeremy Scott while lip-syncing to their song on the runway. In the end, Bianca was eliminated.: Eliminated: Bianca Eigenfeld; Featured director: Mario Schmolka; Special guest: Jeremy Scott
222	11	"Boys Boys Boys!"	9 April 2020
The next week started with a teaching on how to pose underwater. On the next day, the girls had to pose underwater as princesses with a male model. Then, the girls had a casting for John Frieda. Larissa was booked for the job and got immunity for the next elimination. At elimination, the girls each had to perform a different style of dance. In the end, Julia P. was eliminated.: Booked for job & immune from elimination: Larissa Neumann; Eliminated: Julia Przybylski; Featured photographer: Russell James; Special guests: Massimo Sinato & Rebecca Mir; Featured client: John Frieda
223	12	"Kalendar Girls"	16 April 2020
The week started with a photoshoot for the amfAR charity calendar. The girls had to pose nude with ballons. After that, Heidi chose Jacky and Tamara to come with her to the amfAR gala. At the fitting for the amfAR gala, designer Christian Siriano booked Jacky for his fashion show. At elimination, the girls had to walk in recycled outfits. The girls also had to make a speech about a personal message. Anastasia, Nadine and Tamara landed in the bottom three. In the end, Nadine was eliminated.: Booked for job: Jacky Wruck; Bottom three: Anastasia Borisova, Nadine Wimmer & Tamara Hitz; Eliminated: Nadine Wimmer; Featured photographer: Brian Bowen Smith; Special guest: Chiara Ferragni; Featured client: Christian Siriano
224	13	"Over The Edge"	23 April 2020
The week started with a casting for Dyson. Jacky was booked for the job. After that, the girls had their next photoshoot. The girls had to jump from a platform while being suspended in the air. On the next day, the girls had another dance teaching. At elimination, the girls had to dance and perform in groups. Anastasia, Larissa and Vivian landed in the bottom three. In the end, Vivian was eliminated.: Booked for job: Jacky Wruck; Bottom three: Anastasia Borisova, Larissa Neumann & Vivian Cole; Eliminated: Vivian Cole; Featured photographer: Vijat Mohindra; Special guest: Nicole Scherzinger; Featured client: Dyson
225	14	"Transformation"	30 April 2020
The week started with a teaching with former judge Thomas Hayo. On the next day, the girls had their next photoshoot. The girls had to portray aliens while posing with a child. At elimination, Anastasia, Lijana and Maribel landed in bottom three. In the end, Maribel was eliminated.: Bottom three: Anastasia Borisova, Lijana Kaggwa & Maribel Sancia Todt; Eliminated: Maribel Sancia Todt; Featured photographer: Derek Kettela; Special guest: Thomas Hayo
226	15	"The cover is yours!"	7 May 2020
The week started with the biggest photoshoot of the season, the Harper's Bazaar cover shoot. After that, the girls got visits from their family and friends. On the next day, the girls had a casting for Sephora. Maureen was booked for the job. Tamara was booked for a Philipp Plein fashion show. At elimination, the girls walked in August Getty couture dresses. Larissa and Tamara landed in the bottom two. In the end, Larissa was eliminated.: Booked for job: Maureen Ugodi & Tamara Hitz; Bottom three: Anastasia Borisova, Larissa Neumann & Tamara Hitz; Eliminated: Larissa Neumann; Featured photographer: Regan Cameron; Special guest: August Getty, Coco Rocha & Kerstin Schneider; Featured clients: Philipp Plein & Sephora
227	16	"Halbfinale"	14 May 2020
The week started with the next photoshoot. The girls had to pose in couture dresses at a height of 15 meters. After the shoot, Tamara was eliminated. On the next day, Heidi visited the girl in their model mansion and did a teaching with them. At elimination, the girls walked in Julien MacDonald dresses and against top model Toni Garrn. Anastasia and Lijana landed in the bottom two. Anastasia was eliminated, making Jacky, Lijana, Maureen and Sarah P. the Top 4.: Shoot-out: Anastasia Borisova & Tamara Hitz; Eliminated outside of panel: Tamara Hitz; Bottom two: Anastasia Borisova & Lijana Kaggwa; Eliminated: Anastasia Borisova; Featured photographer: Marc Baptiste; Special guest: Julien MacDonald & Toni Garrn
228	17	"Das große Finale"	21 May 2020
The big finale started with a fashion show. After that, Lijana decided to quit the competition because of the cyberbullying and hate commentary she received over the past few weeks for her behavior on the show. Then, the girls had their last photoshoot. The girls portrayed burlesque girls while posing in a life-sized martini glass. After that, Maureen was eliminated. Next, the remaining two girls had their last fashion show. After the final runway, Jacky was declared the 15th winner of Germany's Next Topmodel.: Final four: Jacky Wruck, Lijana Kaggwa, Maureen Ugodi & Sarah Posch; Quit: Lijana Kaggwa; Final three: Jacky Wruck, Maureen Ugodi & Sarah Posch; Bottom two: Maureen Ugodi & Sarah Posch; Eliminated: Maureen Ugodi; Personality Award & booked for job: Tamara Hitz; Final two: Jacky Wruck & Sarah Posch; Germany's Next Topmodel: Jacky Wruck; Featured photographer: Christian Anwander; Special guests: Carina Zavline, Christian Anwander, Friedrichstadt-Palast ensemble, Gisele Oppermann, Jacqueline Thießen, Klaudia Giez, Micaela Schäfer, Nikeata Thompson, Philipp Plein, Rebecca Mir, Sara Kulka, Tatjana Wiedemann, Theresia Fischer & Thomas Hayo; Featured client: Philipp Plein

== Summaries ==
=== Results table ===
Place	Model	Episodes																		
Place	Model	1	2 (Note: In episode 2, Jacky, Maribel and Valeria joined the competition.)	3	4 (Note: In episode 4, Maureen was sick and couldn't participate in this week's photoshoot.)	5 (Note: In episode 5, Cassandra, Johanna, Maribel, Marie and Tamara landed in the bottom five but were saved, because Heidi had a parasite and couldn't participate at the elimination. Nevertheless, they were put into the shoot-out.)	6 (Note: In episode 6, Cassandra and Marie were eliminated outside of panel after losing the shoot-out. Bianca was sick and was absent from elimination.)	7	8 (Note: In episode 8, Mareike decided to quit the competition.)	9	10	11 (Note: In episode 11, Larissa was booked for the job and was granted immunity from elimination.)	12	13	14	15	16 (Note: In episode 16, Tamara was eliminated outside of panel after losing the shoot-out.)	17 (Note: In episode 17, Lijana decided to quit the competition during the finale.)		
1	Jacky	—N/a	SAFE	SAFE	SAFE	SAFE	SAFE	SAFE	SAFE	SAFE	SAFE	SAFE	SAFE	SAFE	SAFE	SAFE	SAFE	SAFE	SAFE	WIN
2	Sarah P.	SAFE	SAFE	SAFE	SAFE	SAFE	SAFE	SAFE	SAFE	SAFE	SAFE	SAFE	SAFE	SAFE	SAFE	SAFE	SAFE	SAFE	LOW	OUT
3	Maureen	SAFE	SAFE	SAFE	—N/a	SAFE	SAFE	SAFE	SAFE	SAFE	SAFE	SAFE	SAFE	SAFE	SAFE	SAFE	SAFE	SAFE	OUT	
4	Lijana	SAFE	SAFE	SAFE	SAFE	SAFE	SAFE	SAFE	SAFE	SAFE	SAFE	SAFE	SAFE	SAFE	LOW	SAFE	LOW	QUIT		
5	Anastasia	SAFE	SAFE	SAFE	SAFE	SAFE	SAFE	SAFE	SAFE	SAFE	SAFE	SAFE	LOW	LOW	LOW	SAFE	OUT			
6	Tamara	SAFE	SAFE	SAFE	SAFE	LOW	SAFE	SAFE	SAFE	SAFE	SAFE	SAFE	LOW	SAFE	SAFE	LOW	OUT			
7	Larissa	SAFE	SAFE	SAFE	SAFE	SAFE	SAFE	SAFE	SAFE	SAFE	SAFE	IMM	SAFE	LOW	SAFE	OUT				
8	Maribel	—N/a	SAFE	SAFE	SAFE	LOW	SAFE	SAFE	LOW	LOW	SAFE	SAFE	SAFE	SAFE	OUT					
9	Vivian	SAFE	SAFE	SAFE	SAFE	SAFE	SAFE	SAFE	SAFE	SAFE	SAFE	SAFE	SAFE	OUT						
10	Nadine	SAFE	SAFE	SAFE	SAFE	SAFE	SAFE	SAFE	SAFE	SAFE	SAFE	SAFE	OUT							
11	Julia P.	SAFE	SAFE	SAFE	SAFE	SAFE	SAFE	SAFE	SAFE	SAFE	SAFE	OUT								
12	Bianca	SAFE	SAFE	SAFE	SAFE	SAFE	—N/a	SAFE	SAFE	SAFE	OUT									
13	Johanna	SAFE	SAFE	SAFE	SAFE	LOW	SAFE	SAFE	SAFE	OUT										
14	Julia F.	SAFE	SAFE	SAFE	SAFE	SAFE	SAFE	SAFE	OUT											
15	Mareike	SAFE	SAFE	SAFE	SAFE	SAFE	SAFE	SAFE	QUIT											
16	Lucy	SAFE	SAFE	SAFE	SAFE	SAFE	SAFE	OUT												
17-18	Pinar	SAFE	SAFE	SAFE	SAFE	SAFE	OUT													
17-18	Sarah S.	SAFE	SAFE	SAFE	SAFE	SAFE	OUT													
19-20	Cassandra	SAFE	SAFE	SAFE	SAFE	LOW	OUT													
19-20	Marie	SAFE	SAFE	SAFE	SAFE	LOW	OUT													
21-23	Alina	SAFE	SAFE	SAFE	OUT															
21-23	Laura	SAFE	SAFE	SAFE	OUT															
21-23	Valeria	—N/a	SAFE	SAFE	OUT															
24-25	Malin	SAFE	SAFE	OUT																
24-25	Saskia	SAFE	SAFE	OUT																
26-28	Charlotte	SAFE	OUT																	
26-28	Daria	SAFE	OUT																	
26-28	Nina-Sue	SAFE	OUT																	

The contestant was eliminated
The contestant was eliminated outside of judging panel
The contestant was in danger of elimination
The contestant won the competition

=== Photo shoot guide ===
- Episode 2 photo shoot: Posing in the jungle in groups with a male model
- Episode 3 photo shoot: Nude on the beach with a horse
- Episode 4 photo shoot: Jumping while posing as action stars
- Episode 5 photo shoot: Sedcard
- Episode 6 photo shoot: Posing in a cave with insects
- Episode 7 photo shoot: Portraying Marilyn Monroe in a box on the Walk of Fame
- Episode 8 photo shoot: Posing at the end of the runway in Christian Cowan gowns
- Episode 9 photo shoot: Posing in groups while being splashed with colored powder in a desert in groups
- Episode 10 video shoot: Cowgirls in a bar fight scene
- Episode 11 photo shoot: Underwater princesses while posing with a male model
- Episode 12 photo shoot: amfAR charity calendar
- Episode 13 photo shoot: Jumping while being suspended in the air
- Episode 14 photo shoot: Aliens while posing with a child
- Episode 15 photo shoot: Harper's Bazaar cover
- Episode 16 photo shoot: Posing in heights & couture dresses
- Episode 17 photo shoot: Burlesque girls on top of a life-sized martini glass

== Controversies ==
In January 2021, former contestant Maribel Sancia Todt said that the production portrayed her as "pretty stupid" and "introverted". This behavior was "totally provoked" by the production crew. "They made me so sick and unsettled with their questions," explains Maribel. As a result, she refused to speak and became more and more silent. Her conclusion: "I was just smart enough to keep my mouth shut at the right moment."

Contestant Lijana Kaggwa received death threats after participating in the show. She told that she was spat on the street and people tried to poison her dog, which led to police protection. She decided to quit at the live final due to these incidents. Christian Vock from web.de criticized the show for not being completely aware of these death threats. He said that the editing room was mainly used to show unpleasant statements from Lijana on TV and thus exaggerate it. Mareike Fangmann from Stern wrote: "The broadcasting channel ProSieben has also a complicity because the broadcaster knows exactly how to cut scenes together in order to identify a clear bitch. Good for the ratings, good for the show. [...] But ProSieben should have protected Lijana beforehand. Could have omitted scenes to protect her and thus incited less hatred."

In May 2022, Lijana Kaggwa reveals the inhumane practices of Germany's Next Topmodel in a YouTube video. The video has 2.4 million views in nine days. Nathalie Volk (contestant from Season 9) said that Lijana Kaggwa is telling the truth and furthermore that this show is bullying and assault. There was an incident when Heidi Klum threw her into the pool and threw off color balloons. She was 16 years old at the time and also bled. She said: "I have scars on my body because of Heidi." The broadcaster ProSieben takes legal action against Lijana Kaggwa and Nathalie Volk. Volk said: "I find it unbelievable that the broadcaster would like to report us, Lijana and me. I've also spoken to many Americans here. They are also totally appalled that the broadcaster and the broadcasting group want to sue young women for telling the truth." She also stated that she is still traumatized by the show.

In the course of the allegations of former contestants against the show and Heidi Klum, the Germany-wide very famous YouTuber Rezo also strongly criticized Germany's Next Topmodel and was surprised that the show had not yet been canceled. His video is called: "Abu$e, lies and minors".

In July 2022, after Lijana Kaggwa was sued by the creators for her criticism of the show, the court agreed that Lijana Kaggwa was right on crucial points. She can now officially say and write: "The production of 'Germany's Next Topmodel' manipulated me on the set in such a way that I correspond to the role model of the bitch. Entire actions were given to me.” Lijana Kaggwa can therefore continue to be critical about the show and has just announced another unveiling video on Instagram, which is supposed to be about the court process and the verdict.

In March 2023, former judge Peyman Armin apologized to Lijana Kaggwa for what she had experienced in Germany's Next Topmodel. He also apologized for being part of Germany's Next Topmodel and promised to never take part in the show again. All of this was broadcast in the format "13 questions" on ZDF.
