= Alicia Endemann =

German actress (born 1988)

- Born: 15 December 1988 (age 37); Hamburg, West Germany
- Beauty pageant titleholder
- Title: Miss Universe Germany 2012
- Hair color: Dark Red
- Eye color: Hazelnut
- Major competitions: Miss Universe Germany 2012 (Winner); Miss Universe 2012 (Unplaced)

Alicia Endemann (born 15 December 1988, Hamburg) is a German actress and beauty pageant titleholder who was crowned Miss Universe Germany 2012 She represented Germany at Miss Universe 2012.

Endemann, whose parents are both actors, Jocelyne Boisseau and Gernot Endemann, has also taken up acting. She starred in 364 episodes of the Nickelodeon television series, Das Haus Anubis, as Luzy Rosaline Schoppa between 2009 and 2012. In 2013, she starred in the television drama Danni Lowinski, as a German lawyer, Claudia. In 2016, she starred in French movie as Anneke in Ma famille t'adore déjà

She speaks five languages and has studied Marketing and Management at college in Antwerp, Belgium.

Awards and achievements
Preceded by Valeria Bystritskaia	Miss Universe Germany; 2012	Succeeded by Anne-Julia Hagen
