= Miss Europe 1956 =

International beauty pageant

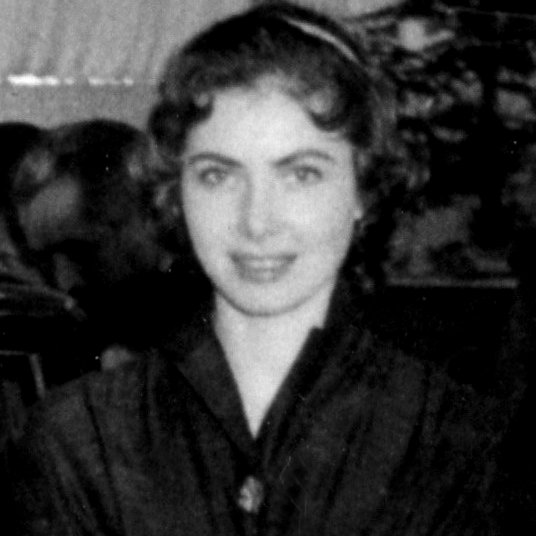
- Margit Nünke
- Date: 1 June 1956
- Venue: Stockholm, Sweden
- Entrants: 13
- Placements: 5
- Withdrawals: Denmark
- Returns: Ireland
- Winner: Margit Nünke; Germany

Miss Europe 1956 was the 19th edition of the Miss Europe pageant, held in Stockholm, Sweden on 1 June 1956. At the end of the event, Inga-Britt Söderberg of Finland crowned Margit Nünke of Germany as Miss Europe 1956.

Contestants from thirteen countries competed in this year's pageant.

== Results ==
=== Placements ===
Placement	Contestant
Miss Europe 1956	West Germany – Margit Nünke
1st runner-up	Sweden – Ingrid Goude
2nd runner-up	Italy – Brunella Tocci
3rd runner-up	Austria – Traudl Eichinger
4th runner-up	Holland – Rita Schmidt

== Contestants ==
=== Selection of participants ===
Contestants from thirteen countries competed in this edition. This edition saw the return of Ireland and the withdrawal of Denmark. Despite confessing that she is already married, Phyllis Glass of Ireland was still allowed to compete.

=== List of contestants ===
Thirteen contestants competed for the title.

Country/Territory	Contestant	Age (Note: Ages at the time of the pageant)	Hometown
Austria	Traudl Eichinger	–	Vienna
Belgium	Rosette Ghislain	22	Hainaut
England	Ilena Nelson	18	Liverpool
Finland	Sirpa Koivu	18	Salo
France	Gisèle Charbit	18	Casablanca
Greece	Rona Karakasi	–	Athens
Holland	Rita Schmidt	20	Alkmaar
Ireland	Phyllis Glass	22	Dublin
Italy	Brunella Tocci	19	Rome
Sweden	Ingrid Goude	19	Sandviken
Switzerland	Yvonne Bridel	–	–
Turkey	Ayşe Banu Denizli	–	Istanbul
West Germany	Margit Nünke	24	Stettin
