= Miss Universe Germany 2017 =

- Date: September 24, 2017
- Venue: Dormero Hotel Bonn, Windhagen, Germany
- Entrants: 10
- Placements: 3
- Winner: Sophia Koch; Saxony-Anhalt

The Miss Universe Germany 2017 pageant was held on September 24, 2017 in the Dormero Hotel Bonn in Windhagen. At the conclusion of the final night of competition, Sophia Koch from Saxony-Anhalt won the title. She represented Germany at Miss Universe 2017 pageant held in November 2017. The director of the pageant, Kim Kotter set thirty-two franchise holders to be able to select candidates to represent states and regions of the country.

== Final results ==
Final results	Contestant
Miss Universe Germany 2017	Saxony-Anhalt - Sophia Koch
1st Runner-up	Lower Saxony - Sophie Imelmann
2nd Runner-up	Westdeutschland - Dalina Staszewski

== Official Delegates ==
State	Contestant	Age	Height	Hometown
Bavaria	Jasmin Griebl	21	180 cm (5 ft 11 in)	Schwandorf
Hesse	Camilla Schenkel	21	172 cm (5 ft 7 1/2 in)	Wetzlar
Lower Saxony	Sophie Imelmann	21	172 cm (5 ft 7 1/2 in)	Garbsen
North Rhine-Westphalia	Mara Weinert	22	174 cm (5 ft 8 1/2 in)	Troisdorf
Ostdeutschland	Tanja Gremmelmaier	19	179 cm (5 ft 10 1/2 in)	Eitting
Rhineland-Palatinate	Christina Peno	21	173 cm (5 ft 8 in)	Dudenhofen
Saxony	Vivien Wehner	21	174 cm (5 ft 8 1/2 in)	Leipzig
Saxony-Anhalt	Sophia Koch	20	170 cm (5 ft 7 in)	Halle
Süddeutschland	Mona Schafnitzl	21	170 cm (5 ft 7 in)	Mindelheim
Westdeutschland	Dalina Staszewski	20	179 cm (5 ft 10 1/2 in)	Oberhausen
