= Miss Germany 2014 =

- Date: August 31, 2014
- Venue: The Tagore Centre, Berlin, Germany
- Broadcaster: ARD
- Entrants: 15
- Winner: Josefin Donat; Saxony

The Miss Universe Germany 2014 pageant was held on August 31, 2014. This year only 15 candidates were competing for the national crown. Each delegate represents a states and regions of the country. The chosen was Josefin Donat she represented Germany at the Miss Universe 2014. The winner of best national costume, the costume used in Miss Universe 2014.

== Final results ==
Final results	Contestant
Miss Universe Germany 2014	Saxony - Josefin Donat
1st Runner-up	Bavaria - Sandra S. López
2nd Runner-up	Baden-Württemberg - Valmira Krasniqi
Semifinalists	Bavaria - Martina Ivezaj; Berlin - Brenda Schwuchow; Hesse - Liz Valdéz; Berlin - Susanna Schönfelder; Bavaria - Jasmin Herzinger; North Rhine-Westphalia - Johanna Acs

== Official Delegates ==
Represent	Contestant	Age	Height
Bavaria	Sandra S. López	25	1.77 m (5 ft 9 1/2 in)
Baden-Württemberg	Valmira Krasniqi	18	1.74 m (5 ft 8 1/2 in)
Bavaria	Martina Ivezaj	24	1.76 m (5 ft 9 1/2 in)
Berlin	Albana Nocaj	24	1.76 m (5 ft 9 1/2 in)
Brandenburg	Brenda Schwuchow	20	1.80 m (5 ft 11 in)
Hesse	Liz Valdéz	25	1.79 m (5 ft 10 1/2 in)
Mecklenburg-Western Pomerania	Viktoria Fischer	20	1.79 m (5 ft 10 1/2 in)
Norddeutschland	Sofie-Susan Henry	22	1.72 m (5 ft 7 1/2 in)
North Rhine-Westphalia	Johanna Acs	22	1.75 m (5 ft 9 in)
Ostdeutschland	Susanna Schönfelder	26	1.81 m (5 ft 11 1/2 in)
Saxony	Josefin Donat	19	1.78 m (5 ft 10 in)
Saxony-Anhalt	Fabienne Hanisch	18	1.85 m (6 ft 1 in)
Schleswig-Holstein	Sabrina Licata	25	1.88 m (6 ft 2 in)
Süddeutschland	Jasmin Herzinger	20	1.83 m (6 ft 0 in)
Thuringia	Pia Maria Buchmeier	19	1.73 m (5 ft 8 in)
