= Anne-Julia Hagen =

German model and beauty pageant winner

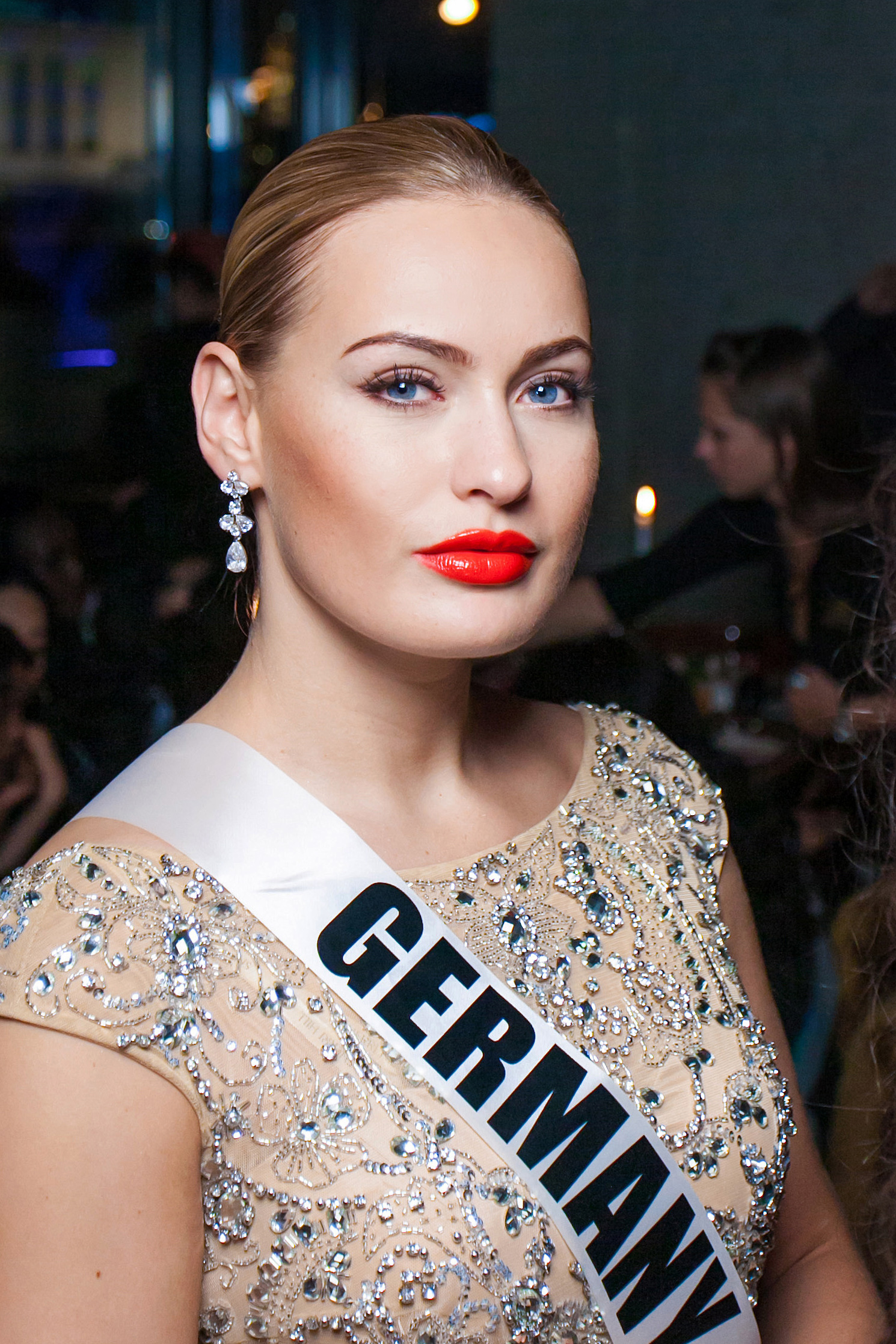
- Born: Anne-Julia Hagen; 22 May 1990 (age 36); West Berlin, West Germany
- Height: 1.74 m (5 ft 8 1/2 in)
- Beauty pageant titleholder
- Title: Miss Germany 2010; Miss Universe Germany 2013
- Hair color: Blonde
- Eye color: Blue
- Major competitions: Miss Germany 2010 (Winner); Miss Universe Germany 2013 (Winner); Miss Universe 2013

Anne-Julia Hagen (born 22 May 1990) is a German model and beauty pageant titleholder who was crowned Miss Universe Germany 2013 and represented her country at the Miss Universe 2013 pageant. She would later appear on the CNBC game show Deal or No Deal as a briefcase model (holding briefcase 23) in 2018.

== Early life ==
Hagen was a student of English and American Studies as well as Cultural Studies at the University of Potsdam. She majored in Military Studies and, as of 2018, was enrolled in an individual Ph.D. program. She is fluent in German and English and has a good command of French.

== Pageantry career ==
=== Miss Germany 2010 ===
Hagen was crowned as Miss Germany 2010 at the Europa Park in Rust on 13 February 2010. She entered the pageant as Miss Berlin 2010.

=== Miss Universe Germany 2013 ===
Hagen was crowned Miss Universe Germany 2013 at the conclusion of the final casting held on 8 September 2013 in Amersfoort/Netherlands.

Awards and achievements
| Preceded by Doris Schmidts | Miss Germany; 2010 | Succeeded by Anne-Kathrin Kosch |
| Preceded by Alicia Endemann | Miss Universe Germany; 2013 | Succeeded by Josefin Donat |
