= Arena of Fear =

1959 film directed by Arthur Maria Rabenalt

- Austrian film poster
- German: Geliebte Bestie
- Directed by: Arthur Maria Rabenalt
- Written by: Hans Fritz Köllner; Kurt Nachmann; Heinrich Seiler (novel)
- Produced by: Herbert Gruber
- Starring: Gerhard Riedmann; Margit Nünke; Willy Birgel
- Cinematography: Günther Anders
- Edited by: Arnfried Heyne
- Music by: Bert Grund
- Production companies: Sascha Film; Lux-Film Wien
- Distributed by: UFA
- Release date: 18 February 1959
- Running time: 96 minutes
- Country: Austria
- Language: German

Arena of Fear (German: Geliebte Bestie) is a 1959 Austrian drama film directed by Arthur Maria Rabenalt and starring Gerhard Riedmann, Margit Nünke and Willy Birgel.

The film's sets were designed by the art directors Alexander Sawczynski and Werner Schlichting. Location filming took place at the Circus Busch-Roland.

== Cast ==
- Gerhard Riedmann as Ruda, Raubtierdompteur
- Margit Nünke as Beatrix
- Willy Birgel as Cameron, Kunstschütze
- Fred Bertelmann as John
- Mady Rahl as Marianne
- Gustav Knuth as Carl de Vries
- Massimo Giuliani as Willi, Dodys Sohn
- Gretl Schörg as Olga
- Sigrid Marquardt as Anita
- Heinz Moog as director Larzheim
- Charles Baumann as Cavalli
- Leopold Hainisch as Riley
- Mario Kranz as Tierwärter Freese
- Emanuel Sackey as Taula
- Ljuba Welitsch as Mama Allison
- Walter Giller as Dody
- Karl Kritel as Emil
- Otto Hejdusek as Wirt
- Berta Vitek as Frau Sandomir
- Josef Menschik as Zöllner

== See also ==
- Men Are That Way (1939)
