= Margit Nünke =

German model and actress

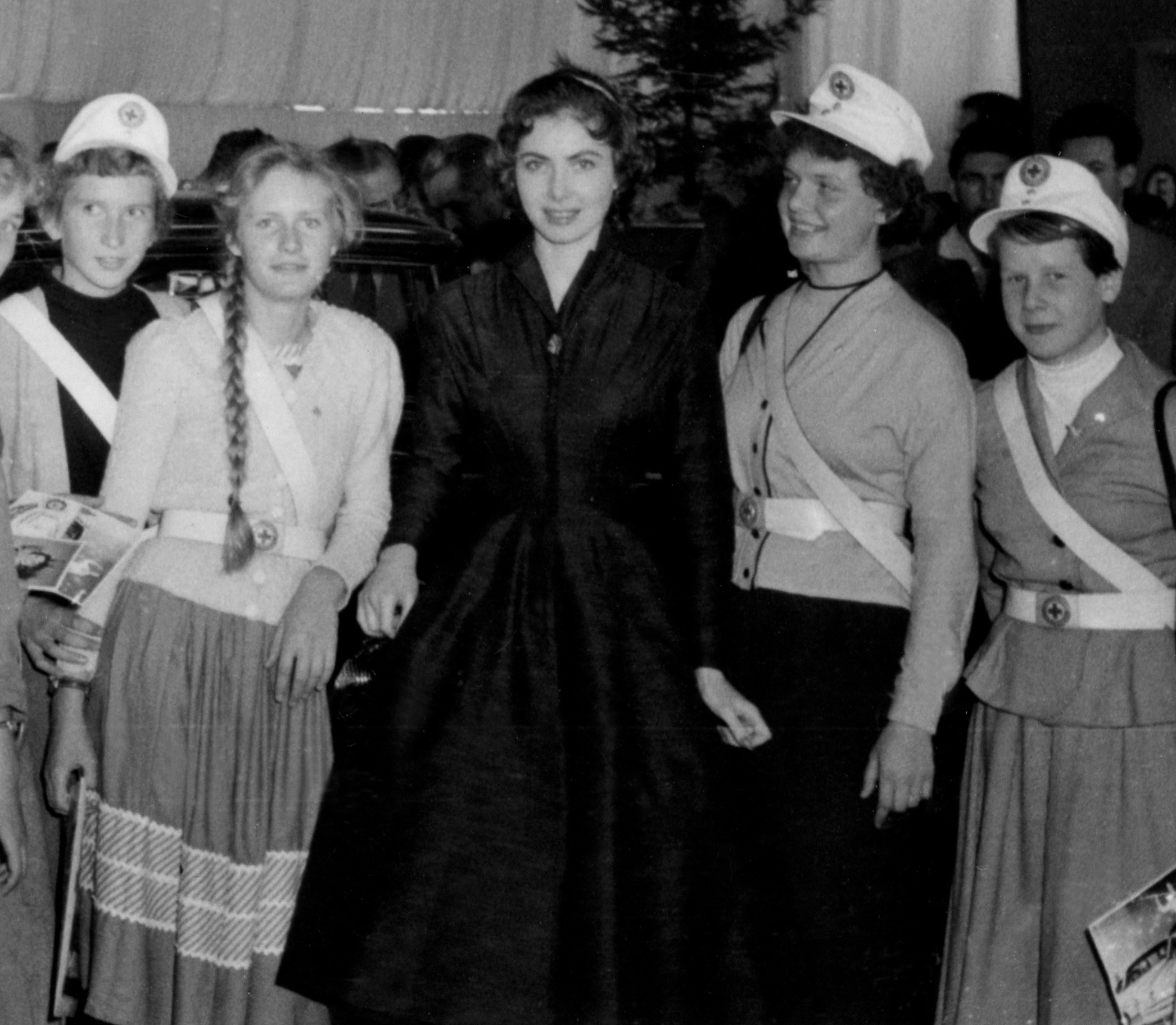
Margit Nünke as Miss Germany at International Motor Show Germany 1955 in Frankfurt

Margit Nünke (15 November 1930, in Stettin – 10 January 2015, in Munich) was a German actress, model and beauty pageant titleholder.

== Life ==
Nünke became Miss Germany on 11 June 1955 after previously being Miss North Rhine-Westphalia. In 1956, she won the election for Miss Europe 1956. When Miss Universe 1955 in Long Beach, California, they reached the final and 4th place.

She appeared from 1957 to 1965 in nine feature films and two television movies, and from 1984 to 1985 in the TV series A class apart with. Margit Nünke was the female lead in several films and was a partner of Peter Alexander, Gerhard Riedmann, and Toni Sailer, among others. As a singer, she recorded several singles, including a duet with Peter Garden.

== Later years ==
Nünke lived in Munich with her husband of more than 40 years, actor Peter Garden. Garden died on 7 January 2015; Margit Nünke died three days later.

== Selected filmography ==
- Engaged to Death (1957)
- Arena of Fear (1959)
- Twelve Girls and One Man (1959)
- Guitars Sound Softly Through the Night (1960)
