= Alessandra Alores =

Ukrainian-born German model

- Born: Alexandra Vodjanikova; 6 October 1984 (age 41); Kyiv, Ukrainian SSR, Soviet Union
- Occupation: Model
- Known for: Miss Universe 2003 contestant, Top Model of the World 2007 winner

Alessandra Alores (born Alexandra Vodjanikova, 6 October 1984, Kyiv, Ukrainian SSR) is a Ukrainian-German model.

== Сareer ==
On 18 January 2003 Vodjanikova was crowned Miss Deutschland at the Nachtarena nightclub in Bielefeld. During her interview she named Saddam Hussein as the politician she would most like to meet. Weeks later she flew to Baghdad with her manager on a peace mission organized by German anti-war groups. A meeting with the Iraqi president did not take place, but she visited the ruins of Babylon and met his son Uday Hussein. Later that year, still competing under her birth name, she represented Germany at Miss Universe 2003 in Panama City, reached the semi-finals at Miss Europe and took part in Miss International.

Later Vodjanikova worked as a model under the name Alessandra Alores, signing with Wilhelmina and IMG Models in New York. In January 2008 she won the Top Model of the World final in Hurghada, Egypt. On 6 September 2009 she was crowned Miss World Deutschland in Moers but was later disqualified by the Miss World Organisation due to unauthorized photo shoots and replaced by Stefanie Peeck.
