= Jacqueline Wruck =

German model (born 1998)

- Born: 5 November 1998 (age 27)
- Known for: Winner the 15th season of Germany's Next Topmodel

Jacqueline "Jacky" Sarah Wruck (born 5 November 1998) is a German model. She won the 15th season of Germany's Next Topmodel.

== Biography ==
Wruck applied for the 15th season of Germany's Next Topmodel, but only joined the show after the start of the season together with two other candidates as a replacement. She accompanied Klum to the amfAR-Gala in New York and ran on the New York Fashion Week. In the final she won Euro 100,000 and a contract with ONEeins fab. She also appeared on the cover of the magazine Harper's Bazaar.

Before her modeling career, Wruck worked as a veterinary assistant in her parents' veterinary practice. She lives in the Rheingau.
