= Valeria Bystritskaia =

Miss Universe Germany 2011

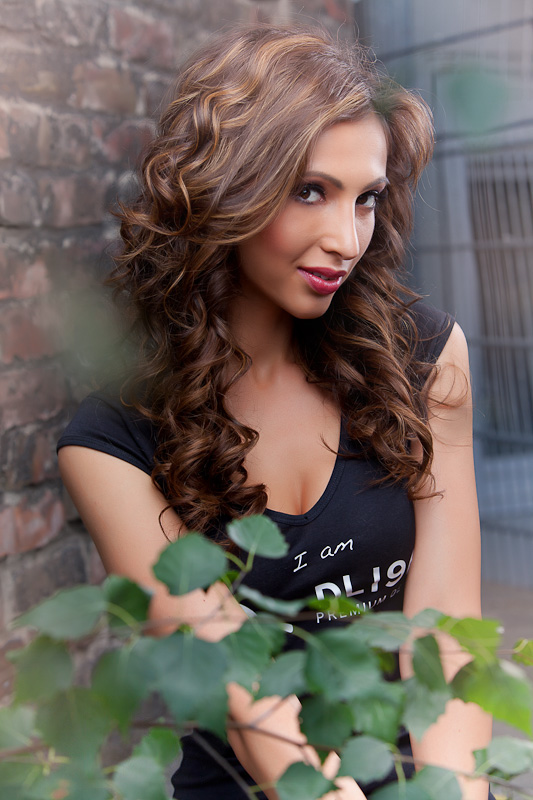
- Valeria Bystritskaia
- Born: Valeria Bystritskaia; 20 June 1986 (age 40); Moscow, Soviet Union
- Height: 1.76 m (5 ft 9 1/2 in)
- Beauty pageant titleholder
- Title: Miss Universe Germany 2011
- Hair color: Dark brown
- Eye color: Hazelnut
- Major competitions: Miss Universe Germany 2011 (Winner); Miss Universe 2011 (Unplaced)

Valeria Bystritskaia (born 20 June 1986 in Moscow) is a Russian-German actress, model and beauty pageant titleholder. She was born to a Ukrainian Jewish mother and Russian father, and moved to Germany with her mother at age 7 to escape antisemitism in Russia. She was elected on 7 July 2011 in Berlin during the Berlin fashion Week as Miss Universe Germany 2011.

She represented Germany at Miss Universe 2011 on 12 September 2011 in São Paulo in Brazil. She was a favorite to win the title. Valeria Bystritskaia is 176 cm tall and her measurements are 86–60–90 cm. Following her victory she faced antisemitic harassment, despite having not publicized her Jewish background during the Miss Universe pageant. She decided to leave Germany and settled in the United States.

Awards and achievements
Preceded by Kristiana Rohder	Miss Universe Germany; 2011	Succeeded by Alicia Endemann
