= Josefin Donat =

Miss Universe Germany 2014

- Born: Josefin Donat; 22 February 1994 (age 32); Leipzig, Germany
- Occupation: Nurse
- Height: 5 ft 5 in (1.65 m)
- Beauty pageant titleholder
- Title: Miss Universe Germany 2014
- Hair color: Blonde
- Eye color: Blue
- Major competitions: Miss Universe Germany 2014 (Winner); Miss Universe 2014 (Unplaced)

Josefin Donat (born 22 February 1994) is a German nurse and beauty pageant titleholder who was crowned Miss Germany Universe 2014 and represented her country at the Miss Universe 2014 pageant.

== Pageantry ==
=== Miss Universe Germany 2014 ===
Donat was crowned as Miss Germany Universe 2014 representing Leipzig on 31 August 2014.

=== Miss Universe 2014 ===
Donat represented Germany at Miss Universe 2014 but did not place in the competition. Her national costume, dedicated to the 25th anniversary of the Fall of the Berlin Wall, placed in the Top 5 of Best National Costume but failed to place in the Top 15 semi-finalists.

Awards and achievements
Preceded by Anne-Julia Hagen	Miss Universe Germany; 2014	Succeeded by Sarah-Lorraine Riek
