= Der Schatz im Niemandsland =

- Starring: Horst Buchholz
- Country of origin: Germany

Der Schatz im Niemandsland is a German television series.

== See also ==
- List of German television series
