= Miss Universe Germany 2018 =

- Date: August 19, 2018
- Venue: Dormero Hotel Bonn, Windhagen, Germany
- Entrants: 10
- Placements: 3
- Winner: Celine Willers; Berlin

The Miss Universe Germany 2018 pageant was held on August 19, 2018 in the Dormero Hotel Bonn in Windhagen. The winner will represent Germany at Miss Universe 2018. The director of the pageant, Kim Kotter has set thirty-two franchise holders to be able to select candidates to represent states and regions of the country.

== Final results ==
Final results	Contestant
Miss Universe Germany 2018	Munich – Celine Willers
1st Runner-up	North Rhine-Westphalia – Franciska Acs
2nd Runner-up	Westdeutschland – Aleksandra Modic

== Official Delegates ==
Representing	Contestant	Age	Height	Hometown
Baden-Württemberg	Vanessa Schmitt	22	1.70 m (5 ft 7 in)	Bruchsal
Berlin	Celine Willers	25	1.77 m (5 ft 9 1/2 in)	Berlin
Bremen	Caroline Krüger	21	1.76 m (5 ft 9 1/2 in)	Bremerhaven
Hessen	Chiara Wulff	25	1.70 m (5 ft 7 in)	Hanau
Lower Saxony	Marina Steinborn	19	1.73 m (5 ft 8 in)	Cuxhaven
Mitteldeutschland	Farina Lege	18	1.75 m (5 ft 9 in)	Hannover
Norddeutschland	Paula Essam	23	1.70 m (5 ft 7 in)	Cologne
North Rhine-Westphalia	Franciska Acs	23	1.72 m (5 ft 7 1/2 in)	Düsseldorf
Rhineland-Palatinate	Gretel Ballestas	24	1.70 m (5 ft 7 in)	Mainz
Westdeutschland	Aleksandra Modic	18	1.74 m (5 ft 8 1/2 in)	Wetzlar
