= Miss Germany =

National beauty pageant in Germany

Miss Germany Corporation
- Formation: 1927; 99 years ago
- Type: Beauty pageant
- Headquarters: Berlin
- Location: Germany
- Members: Miss Universe (Miss Germany 1952–1999) (Miss Deutschland 2000–2008); Miss World (1952–1992); Miss International (1960–2014); Miss Europe (1927–2006)
- Official language: German
- CEO: Horst Klemmer (1960–present)
- Staff: 4

Miss Germany is a national beauty pageant in Germany. The contest was held for the first time in 1927. Since 2020 it is used to honour women with special achievements.

== History ==
In the past there were several organisations which claimed the title: In the 1920s already, German jurisdiction decided that the title Miss Germany could not be patented or registered, thus everybody was allowed to run a contest and name the winner Miss Germany. A similar decision followed in 1982. This resulted in having two titleholders in some years (as in 1928, 1931, 1953 and 1982), elected by different associations.

In 1953, the new organiser and main sponsor of the pageant, the Opal stocking industries, acquired the international franchises for Miss Europe, Miss World, and Miss Universe and built up a kind of monopoly: Other promoters could not delegate their winners to international competitions, thus such rival contests became unattractive. The election of Heidi Krüger by the daily newspaper Hamburger Morgenpost remained an exception for many years.

During the National Socialist era there were no beauty contests. The Nazi government prohibited them as "Jewish-Bolshevik decadence", and instead of them publicised the election of (local) Harvest, Bloom, and Wine Queens. The government forbade Charlotte Hartmann from taking part in the Miss Europe contest in Paris, France. She had been elected Miss Germany a few days before the beginning of the Nazi rule, and secretly took part in the pageant, nevertheless. However, the Saar Territory which was governed by the League of Nations chose a Miss, who was allowed to travel to international competitions.

In the GDR, beauty pageants were also forbidden as "degradation and exploitation of the woman by capitalism". Nevertheless, in the Eastern part of Berlin some contests were held, camouflaged as culture evenings, in the second half of the 1980s. The winners received a cake and a bouquet as a prize. In 1990, the MGC (see above) held the only official election for Miss DDR. The winner, Leticia Koffke, became the first all-German Miss Germany a few months later following reunification.

In some years, no national contests were held: the German delegates for international pageants were handpicked from the regional winners, without a final, as happened from 1972 to 1978. In 1971, the term of Irene Neumann was even extended for another year.

After the bankruptcy of the Opal company, a period of decline followed. There were no financially strong sponsors. Members of the Revolution of 1968 and feminists mobilized against the "meat-inspects". Public interest diminished. Influential organisers became not active before the end of the 1970s. The international franchises held by Opal became vacant. In 1979, Miss Germany was elected live in the German television for the first time. It was not until 1982 that the first rival contest was held again after a long interval.

Since 1985, at least two organisations run rival pageants:

- The MGC (Miss Germany Corporation, Oldenburg) of Horst Klemmer, compère in preliminaries and finals of the 1960s, together with his son Ralf, send their winners to the Miss World and Queen of the World pageants. After an unsuccessful lawsuit of event-manager Erich Reindl in 1982, neither MGC nor another promoter can claim protection of the title. Not before 1999, MGC succeed in having registered Miss Germany as a trade mark at the Office for Harmonization in the Internal Market in Alicante (Spain), and secure the exclusive rights. From 2000 on, other organisers have to pick up other titles—not only for the pageants, but also for their companies' names. In addition to Miss Germany, MGC temporarily held also Miss World Germany, German Miss World, Queen of Germany, and Beauty Queen of Germany. Moreover, there are contests for Misses Germany and Mister Germany and Miss Germany 50 plus. In 2010, it acquired the Miss Earth license -where the Miss Germany winner will take part.
- The Miss Germany Company holds beauty pageants from 1985 to 1991: Miss Europe 1991—Susanne Petry—came there. Not much is known about this company, besides the names of their winners. The company possibly is a predecessor of MGA.
- In 1991, the MGA (Miss Germany Association, Bergheim near Cologne) of Detlef Tursies run a Miss Germany pageant for the first time. The winners participate in Miss Universe, Miss International, Miss Europe, and Miss Intercontinental. In 1999, MGA transforms into MGO (Miss Germany Organisation). From 2000, they award the title Miss Deutschland, and change their name again: MGO - Komitee Miss Deutschland. Furthermore, they hold the international franchises as mentioned above.
- A short time before the title gains exclusivity, the situation becomes most unclear: In 1999, a third Miss Germany appears—Yvonne Wölke from Berlin. In autumn of 1999, two other organisations chose their titleholders for the year 2000—Model of Germany Productions in Mainz-Kastel (= Miss Germany No. 4), and the MGF (Miss Germany Foundation, Barby) in Magdeburg, who awards the title Miss Millennium Deutschland (from 2001, Princess of Germany).

== Titleholders ==
=== 1927–1933 ===
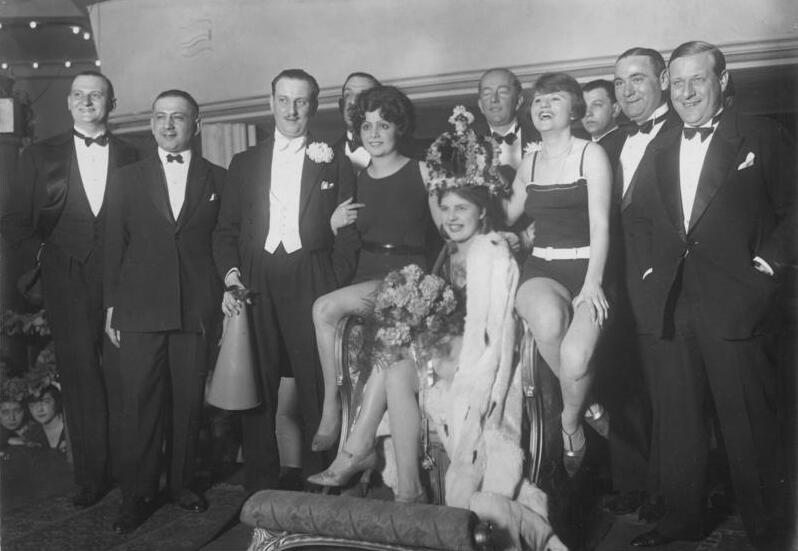
Hildegard Quandt as first Miss Germany, 1927

Year	Miss Germany	Site of Election
1927	Hildegard Quandt	Berlin
1928	Hella Hoffmann	Berlin
1928	Margarete Grow	Berlin
1929	Elisabeth Rodzyn	Berlin
1930	Dorit Nitykowski	Berlin
1931	Ruth Ingrid Richard	Berlin
1931	Daisy D'ora	Berlin
1932	Ruth Behnen	Berlin
1932	Liselotte de Booy-Schulze	Berlin
1933	Charlotte Hartmann	Berlin

Notes: Daisy d'Ora was a pseudonym. The real name of the 1931 winner was Daisy, Baronesse von Freyberg. – In 1935, Elisabeth Pitz from Saarbrücken participated in the Miss Europe Pageant in Paris as last German delegate before World War II. But she was not Miss Germany.

=== 1949–1984 ===
Year	Miss Germany	Regional Titleholder	Site of Election	Placement	Notes
1949	Inge Löwenstein	Miss Stuttgart	Bad Homburg	-	
1950	Susanne Erichsen	Miss Schleswig-Holstein	Baden-Baden	-	
1951	Vera Marks	Miss Bodensee	Baden-Baden	-	
1952	Renate Hoy	?	Baden-Baden	Fourth Runner-up; Miss Universe 1952	
1953	Christel Schaack	Miss Berlin	Wiesbaden	Top 16; Miss Universe 1953	Miss Europe 1954
1953/54	Heidi Krüger	?	Hamburg		
1954	Regina Ernst	Miss Bremen	Baden-Baden	Third Runner-up; Miss Universe 1954	
1955	Margit Nünke	Miss Köln	Baden-Baden	Third Runner-up; Miss Universe 1955	Miss Europe 1956
1956	Marina Orschel	Miss Berlin	Baden-Baden	First Runner-up & Miss Photogenic; Miss Universe 1956	
1957	Gerti Daub	Miss Hamburg	Baden-Baden	Fourth Runner-up & Miss Photogenic; Miss Universe 1957	
1958	Marlies Behrens	Miss Bayern	Baden-Baden	Top 15; Miss Universe 1958	
1959	Carmela Künzel	Miss Berlin	Baden-Baden	Top 15; Miss Universe 1959	
1960	Ingrun Helgard Moeckel	Miss Rheinland	Baden-Baden	Top 15; Miss Universe 1960	Miss Europe 1961
1961	Marlene Schmidt	Miss Baden-Württemberg	Baden-Baden	Miss Universe 1961	
1962	Gisela Karschuck	Miss Hessen	Travemünde	Unplaced; Miss Universe 1962	
1963	Helga Carla Ziesemer	Miss Bayern	Travemünde	Top 15; Miss Universe 1963	
1964	Martina Kettler	Miss Berlin	Berlin	Unplaced; Miss Universe 1964	
1965	Ingrid Bethke	Miss Nordrhein-Westfalen	Berlin	Miss Congeniality; Miss Universe 1965	
1966	Marion Heinrich	Miss Nordrhein-Westfalen	Berlin	Top 15; Miss Universe 1966	
1967	Fee von Zitzewitz†	Miss Schleswig-Holstein	Berlin	Unplaced; Miss Universe 1967	
1968	Lilian Atterer	Miss Bayern	Munich	Unplaced; Miss Universe 1968	
1969	Gesine Froese	Miss Bayern	Munich	Unplaced; Miss Universe 1969	
1970	Irene Neumann	?	San Juan (Puerto Rico)	Unplaced; Miss Universe 1970	
1971	Irene Neumann	—	term extended without election	-	
1972	Heidi Weber	Miss Bayern	appointed without election	Top 12; Miss Universe 1972	
1973	Ingeborg Martin	?	Munich	Top 15; Miss International 1973	
1974	Monja Bageritz	Miss Rheinland	appointed without election	-	
1975	Marina Langner	?	appointed without election	First Runner-up; Miss World 1975	
1976	Monika Schneeweis†	?	Baden-Baden	Unplaced; Miss World 1976	
1977	Dagmar Winkler	Miss Bayern	Baden-Baden	Second Runner-up & Miss Photogenic; Miss World 1977; First Runner-up; Miss International 1977; First Runner-up; Miss Europe 1978/1977	
1978	Monika Greis	Miss Süddeutschland	appointed without election	Unplaced; Miss World 1978	
1979	Andrea Hontschik†	Miss Berlin	Bremen, Studio Radio Bremen (1)	Top 12; Miss Universe 1979; Top 15; Miss World 1979	
1980	Gabriella Brum	Miss Berlin	Berlin	Miss World 1980	Resigned 18 hours after winning the Miss World title
1981	Marion Kurz	Miss Bayern	Munich	Top 12; Miss Universe 1981	
1982	Kerstin Paeserack	Miss Niedersachsen	Palma de Mallorca (Spain)	Top 12; Miss Universe 1982	
1982	Monika Baier	?	Nuremberg	-	
1983	Angela Michel	Miss Franken	Augsburg	-	
1983	Loana Radecki	Miss Berlin	Badgastein (Austria)	Top 12; Miss Universe 1983	
1984	Brigitte Berx	Miss Nordrhein-Westfalen	Bad Mondorf (Luxembourg)	Top 10; Miss Universe 1984	

Note: (1) In 1979, the Miss Germany election was broadcast live on German TV for the first time.

=== From 1985: MGC - Miss Germany Corporation GmbH (Oldenburg) ===
Year	Miss Germany	Regional Titleholder	Site of Election	Placement	Notes
1985/86	Patricia Patek	Miss Hessen	Wangerooge	Miss Metronational	
1986/87	Anja Hörnich	Miss Saarland	Oberstdorf	-	
1987/88	Susann Stoss	Miss Rheinland-Pfalz	Bonn - Bad Godesberg	Queen of the World 1988	
1988/89	Nicole Reinhardt	Miss Baden-Württemberg	Cologne	-	
1989/90	Claudia Weins	Miss Nordrhein-Westfalen	Schwäbisch-Gmünd	-	
1990/91	Leticia Koffke	Miss Brandenburg	Wesseling (near Cologne)	-	
1991/92	Ines Kuba	Miss Berlin	Oldenburg	Queen of the World 1992	
1992/93	Astrid Kuhlmann	Miss Bayern	Berlin	-	
1993/94	Cornelia Oehlmann	Miss Baden-Württemberg	Hanover	-	
1994/95	Beate Almer	Miss Bayern	Cologne	-	
1996	Yasemine Mansoor	Miss Berlin	Berlin	Queen of the World 1996	
1997	Sabrina Paradies	Miss Norddeutschland	Berlin	-	
1998	Michalina Koscielniak	Miss LR-Kosmetik	Berlin	-	
1999	Alexandra Phillips	Miss Süddeutschland	Berlin	-	
2000	Sandra Hoffmann	Miss Mitteldeutschland	Berlin	-	
2001	Mirjana Bogojevic	Miss Hamburg	Berlin	-	
2002	Katrin Wrobel	Miss Berlin	Berlin	-	
2003	Babett Konau	Miss Schleswig-Holstein	Rust	-	
2004	Christina Pinel (Miss Germany)	Miss Nordrhein-Westfalen	Rust	-	
2005	Antonia Schmitz	Miss Nordrhein-Westfalen	Rust	-	
2006	Isabelle Knispel	Miss Berlin	Rust	-	
2007	Nelly Marie Bojahr	Miss T-Online	Rust	-	
2008	Kim-Valerie Voigt	Miss Norddeutschland	Rust	-	
2009	Doris Schmidts	Miss Baden-Württemberg	Rust	-	
2010	Anne Julia Hagen	Miss Berlin	Rust	-	Miss Universe Germany 2013
2011	Anne-Kathrin Kosch	Miss Thüringen	Rust	-	
2012	Isabel Gülck	Miss Schleswig-Holstein	Rust	-	
2013	Caroline Noeding	Miss Niedersachsen	Rust	-	
2014	Vivien Konca	Miss Nordrhein-Westfalen	Rust	-	
2015	Olga Hoffmann	Miss Pearl.tv	Rust	-	
2016	Lena Bröder	Miss Westdeutschland	Rust	-	
2017	Soraya Kohlmann	Miss Sachsen	Rust	-	Miss Universe Germany 2022
2018	Anahita Rehbein	Miss Baden-Württemberg	Rust	-	
2019	Nadine Berneis	Miss Baden-Württemberg	Rust	-	
2020	Leonie von Hase	Miss Schleswig-Holstein	Rust	-	
2021	Anja Kallenbach	Miss Thüringen	Rust	-	-
2022	Domitila Barros	TBD	Rust	-	-
2023	Kira Geiss	TBD	Rust	TBD	TBD
2024	Apameh Schönauer	TBD	Rust	TBD	TBD
2025	Valentina Busik	TBD	Rust	TBD	TBD

=== 1985–1991: Miss Germany Company ===
Miss Germany Company winner was sending to Miss Universe.

Year	Miss Germany	Regional Titleholder	Site of Election	Placement	Notes
1985	Anke Symkowitz	Miss Baden-Württemberg	Baden-Baden, Baden-Württemberg	-	
1986	Birgit Jahn	Miss Bayern	Darmstadt, Hesse	Unplaced; Miss Universe 1986	
1986/87	Dagmar Schulz	Miss Nordrhein-Westfalen	Munich, Bavaria	Unplaced; Miss Universe 1987	
1987/88	Christiane Kopp	Miss Berlin	Düsseldorf, North Rhine-Westphalia	Unplaced; Miss Universe 1988	
1988/89	Andrea Stelzer	Miss Bayern	Hamburg	Top 10; Miss Universe 1989	
1989/90	Christiane Stöcker	Miss Hessen	-	Miss Congeniality; Miss Universe 1990	
1990/91	Susanne Petry	Miss Saarland	East Berlin (Berlin)	Miss Europe 1991; Miss Intercontinental 1992	
1991/92	Monika Resch	Miss Thüringen	Cottbus, Brandenburg	Unplaced; Miss Universe 1992	

=== 1991–1999: MGA - Miss Germany Association GmbH (Bergheim near Cologne) ===
Miss Germany Association GmbH winner was sending to Miss Universe.

Year	Miss Germany	Regional Titleholder	Site of Election	Placement	Notes
1989/90	Marion Winz	Miss Nordrhein-Westfalen	Kaarst, North Rhine-Westphalia	-	
1991	Petra Hack	Miss Nordrhein-Westfalen	Bielefeld, North Rhine-Westphalia	-	
1992	Diana Leisgen	Miss Nordrhein-Westfalen	Dresden, Saxony	-	
1992	Meike Schwarz	Miss Saarland	Dresden, Saxony	Top 15; Miss International 1992	
1993	Verona Feldbusch	Miss Hamburg	Bremen	Miss Intercontinental 1993	
1994	Tanja Wild	Miss Baden-Württemberg	Chemnitz, Saxony	Unplaced; Miss Universe 1994	
1995	Ilka Endres	Miss Rheinland-Pfalz	Trier, Rhineland-Palatinate	Unplaced; Miss Universe 1995	
1996	Miriam Ruppert	Miss Arabella TV	Trier, Rhineland-Palatinate	Unplaced; Miss Universe 1996	
1997	Nadine Schmidt	Miss Rheinland-Pfalz	Trier, Rhineland-Palatinate	Miss Baltic Sea 1997	
1998	Katharina Mainka	Miss Rheinland-Pfalz	Trier, Rhineland-Palatinate	Unplaced; Miss Universe 1983	
1999	Diana Drubig	Miss Sachsen	Trier, Rhineland-Palatinate	Unplaced; Miss Universe 1999	

=== 1999–2000: Other organizers ===
Year	Miss Germany	Regional Titleholder	Site of Election	Placement	Notes
1999	Yvonne Wölke	Berlin	Rolf Eden	-	
2000	Sonja Strobl	Mainz-Kastel	Model of Germany Productions	-	

Notes: Yvonne Wölke became Miss Berlin and participated in Miss Deutschland in 2002. – The pageant and the title of Model of Germany Productions later had to be renamed Model of Germany.

=== 2020: Miss Germany Organisation (Miss Germany Earth) ===
Year	Miss Germany	Regional Titleholder	Site of Election	Placement	Notes
2020	Annabella Fleck	-	-	Top 20; Miss Earth 2020	(silver) Swimsuit; (bronze) Evening Gown

== Miss Deutschland ==
=== Miss Deutschland from 2000: MGO/KMD - Komitee Miss Deutschland (Bergheim near Cologne) ===
From the following competitions, certainly, only Miss Deutschland is of importance. In the inland it does not have the same prestige as Miss Germany, but compensates this, as the election always takes place (and is announced in the media) some weeks before. One can estimate the international presence of the organization by the four assigned titles for 2006. For the other contests there are no complete data available. Also it is not always known whether they still exist. They are only shown here in order to obtain an impression how unclear the situation still is, although there is only one Miss Germany since 2000. Since 2009 German representative to Miss Universe has selected from Miss Universe Germany Organization.

Year	Miss Deutschland	Regional Titleholder	Site of Election	Placement	Notes
2000	Sabrina Schepmann	Miss Ostdeutschland	Kaiserslautern, Rhineland-Palatinate	Miss Intercontinental 2000	
2001	Claudia Bechstein	Miss Thüringen	Kaiserslautern, Rhineland-Palatinate	Unplaced; Miss Universe 2001	
2002	Natascha Börger	Miss Hamburg	Kaiserslautern, Rhineland-Palatinate	Top 10; Miss Universe 2002; Top 12; Miss International 2004	Reina del Coffee Mundial 2002 & Top Model of the World 2002
2003	Alexandra Vodjanikova	Miss Bayern	Bielefeld, North Rhine-Westphalia	Unplaced; Miss Universe 2003	
2004	Shermine Shahrivar [Sharivar]	Miss Süddeutschland	Duisburg, North Rhine-Westphalia	Miss Europe 2005	
2005	Asli Bayram	Miss Nordrhein-Westfalen	Aachen, North Rhine-Westphalia	Unplaced; Miss Universe 2005	
2006	Daniela Domröse	Miss Bayern	Krefeld, North Rhine-Westphalia	-	
2007	Svetlana Tsys	Miss Ostdeutschland	Hurghada (Egypt)	Unplaced; Miss International 2007	
2008	Janice Behrendt	Herford	Dortmund, North Rhine-Westphalia	-	
2009	Alessandra Alores	Köln	Moers, North Rhine-Westphalia	-	
2010	Zallascht Saddat	Miss MGO Süddeutschland	Bergheim, North Rhine-Westphalia	Miss Globe 2011	
2012	Susan Henry	Miss MGO Hessen	Halle, Saxony-Anhalt	Unplaced; Miss Intercontinental 2012	
2013	Elena Schmidt	Miss MGO Berlin	Berlin	Top 15 & Miss Congeniality; Miss Intercontinental 2013	
2014	Egzonita Ala	Miss MGO Süddeutschland	Dortmund, North Rhine-Westphalia	Unplaced; Miss World 2014	
2015	Albjona Muharremaj	Miss MGO Bayern	Dortmund, North Rhine-Westphalia	Unplaced; Miss World 2015	
2017	Dalila Jabri	Miss MGO Nordrhein-Westfalen	Bremen	Unplaced; Miss Intercontinental 2017	
2018	Olivia Möller	Miss MGO Nordrhein-Westfalen	Bremen	Top 20 & Best Evening Gown; Miss Intercontinental 2018	
2019	Philine Dubiel-Hahn	Miss MGO Ostdeutschland	Magdeburg, Saxony-Anhalt	Unplaced; Miss Intercontinental 2019	
2020/2021	Luisa Rüger	Miss MGO Sachsen Anhalt	Bornheim, North Rhine-Westphalia	Top 20, Best in Swimsuit, & Miss Sunrise Resort; Miss Intercontinental 2021	
2022	Tatjana Genrich	Miss MGO Sachsen Anhalt	Online	4th Runner-Up, Best in Swimsuit, & Miss Europe Intercontinental; Miss Intercontinental 2022	
2023	Laura Göcht	Miss MGO Norddeutschland	Hurghada (Egypt)	Unplaced; Miss Intercontinental 2023	
2024	Celina Weil	Miss MGO Mitteldeutschland	Wernigerode, Saxony-Anhalt	4th Runner-Up & Miss Europe Intercontinental; Miss Intercontinental 2024	
2025	TBD	TBD	Wernigerode, Saxony-Anhalt	TBD	

=== Miss Universe Deutschland ===
Year	Miss Deutschland	Regional Titleholder	Site of Election	Placement	Notes
2008	Madina Taher	Miss Berlin Universe	Berlin	Unplaced; Miss Universe 2008	

== Model of Germany from 2000: Model of Germany Productions (Stuttgart) ==
Year	Model of Germany	Regional Titleholder	Site of Election
2000	Sonja Strobl	Saarland Model	Mainz-Kastel
2000	Anja Schröder	Niedersachsen Model	Mainz-Kastel
2001	Slata Hellmann	Thüringen Model	Würzburg'
2002	Pamela Schneider	Berlin Model	Stuttgart
2003	Kristin Wünsche	Mitteldeutschland Model	Friedrichshafen
2004	pageant not held		
2005	Yvonne Maier	Baden-Württemberg Model	Rheinmünster
2006	pageant not held		
2007	?	Baden-Württemberg Model	?

Note: The first pageant was held in the end of 1999 under the title of Miss Germany, but later had to be renamed.

== Miss World Germany ==
=== 1992–1999: Miss World Germany: MGC ===
Year	Miss World Germany	Regional Titleholder	Site of Election	Placement	Notes
1992	Carina Jope	Miss Hessen World	?	Unplaced; Miss World 1992	
1993	Petra Klein	Miss Rheinland-Pfalz World	?	Unplaced; Miss World 1993	
1994	Marte Helberg	Miss Hamburg World	?	Unplaced; Miss World 1994	
1995	Isabell Brauer	Miss Baden-Württemberg World	Köln	Unplaced; Miss World 1995	
1996	Melanie Ernst	Miss Baden-Württemberg World	Köln	Unplaced; Miss World 1996	
1997	Katja Glawe	Miss Berlin World	Berlin	Unplaced; Miss World 1997	
1998	Sandra Ahrabian	Miss Bayern World (?)	Mannheim	Unplaced; Miss World 1998	
1999	Susan Hoecke	Miss Berlin World	München	Unplaced; Miss World 1999	

=== 2000–2001: German Miss World: MGC ===
Year	Miss World Germany	Regional Titleholder	Site of Election	Placement	Notes
2000/01	Natascha Berg	Miss Hessen World	Hannover	Unplaced; Miss World 2000	
2001/02	Adina Wilhelmi	Miss Süddeutschland World	Hannover	Unplaced; Miss World 2001	

=== 2008–2009: Miss World Deutschland ===
Year	Miss World Germany	Regional Titleholder	Site of Election	Placement	Notes
2008	Anne Katrin Walter	Kiel	Erfurt	Unplaced; Miss World 2008	
2009	Alessandra Alores	Köln	Moers	-	

== Beauty Queen of Germany: MGC ==
Year	Beauty Queen of Germany
2000	Agnes Glowacki

=== Beauty-Queen of Germany: BQOG-Management ===
Year	Beauty Queen of Germany
2004/05	Nadine Trompka

=== Queen of Germany: MGC ===
Year	Beauty Queen of Germany	Regional Titleholder	Site of Election
1999	Julienne Grötsch	Queen of Thüringen	Rothenburg ob der Tauber
2000	pageant not held		
2001	Pamela Jones	?	Bamberg
2002	Claudia Grohmann	?	Bamberg
2003	Melanie Eder	Queen of Bayern (?)	München
2004	Ann-Cathrin Schmidt	Queen of Sachsen-Anhalt (?)	Berlin

== Miss Germany 50 plus: From 2012 by MGC - Miss Germany Corporation GmbH ==
Year	Miss Germany 50 Plus	Regional Titleholder	Site of Election
2012/13	Christine Wache	Miss Germany 50 plus 2012	Berlin
2014	Monika Roemer Emich	Miss Germany 50 plus 2014	Flein
2015	Kerstin Marie Huth Rauscher ?	Miss Germany 50 plus 2015	Frankfurt
2016	Martina Selke	Miss Germany 50 plus 2016	Hessen

== Queen of Germany: QGE - Queen of Germany Entertainment (Neuhardenberg, near Frankfurt/Oder) ==
Year	Queen of Germany Entertainment	Regional Titleholder	Site of Election
2000	Yvetta Leogrande	Queen of Niedersachsen	TV-Studio Sat.1
2001-04	?		
2005	Stephanie Schießl	Queen of Bayern	?
2006	Alis Scharkoi	Queen of Berlin	Weimar Atrium
2007	Katrin Schwarz	Queen of Niedersachsen	Duisburg

=== Miss Millennium Deutschland: MGF - Miss Germany Foundation (Barby, Sachsen-Anhalt) ===
Year	Miss Millennium Deutschland
2000	Nadin Becker

=== Princess of Germany: Princess Entertainment & Media Group (Barby, Sachsen-Anhalt) ===
Year	Princess of Germany	Regional Titleholder	Site of Election
2001	Mirjana Bogojevic	?	Halle
2002	Nicole Kratochvil	Princess of Niedersachsen	Halle
2003	Katrin Reimann ?	?	?
2004	Josephina Balasus	Princess of Sachsen-Anhalt	Leipzig

Princess Entertainment is successor of MGF (renamed because the title Miss Germany must not be used any longer). – The pageants concentrate on the new (eastern) lands of the Federal Republic. Note: Mirjana Bogojevic had been elected also as Miss Germany of MGC in 2001.

== Top Model of Germany: MGA/MGO Komitee Miss Deutschland (Bergheim near Cologne) ==
Year	Top Model of Germany
1993-99	?
2000	Heike Schmidt

=== Top Model of Germany: Yet-Set Corporation (Cologne) ===
Year	Top Model of Germany
2001	Daniela Dürr
2002-04	?
2005	Sarah Zöllner

This pageant was promoted by MGA and MGO from 1993 to 2000. In 2001, Yet-Set Corporation in Cologne claims title protection (Titelschutz) according to German law (§ 5 Abs. 3 MarkenG).

=== Model of the World Germany ===
Year	Model of the World Germany	Regional Titleholder	Site of Election
2001	Karin Gillich	Model of the World Bayern	Ulm
2002	Evelina Janke	Model of the World Bremen	München
2003	Stephanie Thier	Model of the World Bayern	Wiesbaden
2004	Daniela Domröse	Model of the World Süddeutschland	Neunkirchen
2005/06	Hana Nitsche	Model of the World Rheinland-Pfalz	Regensburg
2007	Natalie Sulianto	Model of the World Mitteldeutschland	München
2008	Sandra Klinker	Model of the World Bremen	München

=== Miss Millennium Deutschland: MGF - Miss Germany Foundation (Barby, Sachsen-Anhalt) ===
Year	Miss Millennium Deutschland
2000	Nadin Becker

=== Miss Allemagne: Yet-Set Corporation (Cologne) ===
For this pageant Yet-Set Corporation in Cologne also claims title protection in 2001. For winners' names there are contradictory information: In 2001, both Jennifer Dietrich and Eileen Bali are named. In 2003, the pageant happened in Kiel (winner unknown). It seems to have been the last edition.

== Miss pageants in the GDR ==
Miss DDR and predecessors (1986-1988 private events, 1990 MGC)

Year	Miss World Germany	Regional Titleholder	Site of Election
1986	Katrin Gawenda	Miss Frühling (Miss Spring)	Berlin
1987	Cornelia Franzke	Miss Frühling (Miss Spring)	Berlin
1988	Gabi Kirmihs	Miss Sommer (Miss Summer)	Berlin
1990	Leticia Koffke	Miss DDR (Miss GDR)	Schwerin

Note: Leticia Koffke later became Miss Germany for united Germany.

== Titles at major international competitions ==
=== Miss World ===
- 1956: Petra Schürmann (ranked only third in Miss Germany pageant, but was delegated to Miss World because of her better knowledge of English)
- 1980: Gabriella Brum (resigned the day after her election as Miss World)

=== Miss Universe ===
- 1961: Marlene Schmidt

=== Miss International ===
- 1965: Ingrid Finger
- 1989: Iris Klein

=== Miss Europe ===
- 1954: Christel Schaack (disqualified for being a widow)
- 1956: Margit Nünke
- 1961: Ingrun Helgard Moeckel
- 1965: Juliane Herm
- 1972: Monika Sarp
- 1991: Susanne Petry (later disqualified)
- 2005: Shermine Shahrivar (is not Miss Germany but Miss Deutschland)

== See also ==
- Miss Universe Germany
