= Germany's Next Topmodel season 10 =

Germany's Next Topmodel
- Season 10
- Judges: Heidi Klum; Thomas Hayo; Wolfgang Joop
- No. of contestants: 23
- Winner: Vanessa Fuchs
- No. of episodes: 16

Release
- Original network: ProSieben
- Original release: 12 February – 28 May 2015

Season chronology
- ← Previous; Season 9 Next → Season 11

The tenth season of Germany's Next Topmodel aired on German television network ProSieben from 12 February to 28 May 2015 under the catch phrase Celebrate Beauty.

The judging panel remains unchanged, while Kristian Schuller served as exclusive featured photographer for this season.

The winner of the competition was 19-year old Vanessa Fuchs from Bergisch Gladbach. Her prizes include:

- A modeling contract with Günther Klum's OneEins GmbH Management
- A cover and spread in the German edition of Cosmopolitan
- A cash prize worth €100,000.
- An Opel Adam

The international destinations for this season were set in Los Angeles, Oahu, Miami, New York City, Milan, London, Dubai, Auckland, Malé and Paris.

== Contestants ==
(ages stated are at start of contest)

| Contestant | Age | Height | Hometown | Finish | Place |
|---|---|---|---|---|---|
| Sarah Kocar | 22 | 1.73 m (5 ft 8 in) | Ingolstadt | Episode 4 | 23–22 (quit) |
| Annabel Paasch | 16 | 1.83 m (6 ft 0 in) | Rostock | Episode 4 | 23–22 (quit) |
| Laura Weidner | 17 | 1.80 m (5 ft 11 in) | Ingolstadt | Episode 4 | 21–20 |
| Ariana Xhatova | 18 | 1.79 m (5 ft 10 1/2 in) | Kaiserslautern | Episode 4 | 21–20 |
| Adriane Sutsch | 18 | 1.78 m (5 ft 10 in) | Geisenfeld | Episode 5 | 19 |
| Jovana Bulic | 18 | 1.88 m (6 ft 2 in) | Eupen, Belgium | Episode 6 | 18–16 |
| Lena Stockhausen | 18 | 1.82 m (5 ft 11 1/2 in) | Erkrath | Episode 6 | 18–16 |
| Daniela Wolking | 22 | 1.88 m (6 ft 2 in) | Böblingen | Episode 6 | 18–16 |
| Irene Pichler | 20 | 1.76 m (5 ft 9 1/2 in) | Vienna, Austria | Episode 7 | 15–14 |
| Neele Busse | 18 | 1.77 m (5 ft 9 1/2 in) | Halle | Episode 7 | 15–14 |
| Erica Santos Silva | 21 | 1.75 m (5 ft 9 in) | Stuttgart | Episode 8 | 13 |
| Sandy Provazek | 20 | 1.74 m (5 ft 8 1/2 in) | Fellbach | Episode 9 | 12–11 |
| Varisa Caluk | 16 | 1.85 m (6 ft 1 in) | Innsbruck, Austria | Episode 9 | 12–11 |
| Laura Dünninger | 17 | 1.80 m (5 ft 11 in) | Nürnberg | Episode 10 | 10–9 |
| Sara Faste | 16 | 1.78 m (5 ft 10 in) | Lengerich | Episode 10 | 10–9 |
| Chiara 'Kiki' Hölzl | 17 | 1.79 m (5 ft 10 1/2 in) | Braunau, Austria | Episode 12 | 8 |
| Jülide 'Jüli' Ürküt | 17 | 1.75 m (5 ft 9 in) | Niederkrüchten | Episode 13 | 7–6 |
| Lisa Bärmann | 19 | 1.76 m (5 ft 9 1/2 in) | Contwig | Episode 13 | 7–6 |
| Darya Strelnikova | 22 | 1.73 m (5 ft 8 in) | Munich | Episode 14 | 5 |
| Katharina Wandrowsky | 19 | 1.76 m (5 ft 9 1/2 in) | Hamburg | Episode 15 | 4 |
| Ajsa Selimovic | 18 | 1.75 m (5 ft 9 in) | Burladingen | Episode 16 | 3 |
| Anuthida Ploypetch | 17 | 1.76 m (5 ft 9 1/2 in) | Lübeck | Episode 16 | 2 |
| Vanessa Fuchs | 19 | 1.78 m (5 ft 10 in) | Bergisch Gladbach | Episode 16 | 1 |

== Episode summaries ==
| No. overall | No. in season | Title | Original release date |
|---|---|---|---|
| 133 | 1 | "Scouting Berlin and Cologne" | 12 February 2015 |
The first episode of Germany's Next Topmodel 2015 starts in Berlin, where host Heidi Klum and her fellow regular judge Thomas Hayo pick up the third judge, Wolfgang Joop, at his home to board the Germany's Next Topmodel coach. Casting begins, inviting individual contestants with a personal pick-up and the episode ends with a mass-casting in Cologne.
| 134 | 2 | "Scouting Nuremberg, Ingolstadt and Munich" | 19 February 2015 |
In the second episode, Heidi and Thomas continue their casting trip throughout Nuremberg and Ingolstadt. Live auditions take place and some girls receive a wildcard which guarantees a position in the competition. Later, the last auditions are being held in Munich as a mass casting.
| 135 | 3 | "Wrapping castings and first show" | 26 February 2015 |
Third episode chronicles the wrapping of mass castings in Munich. Heidi, Thomas and Wolfgang challenge their select girls with a first runway show for a Turkish designer, the difficult part: the runway is filled with loose gravel. The episode ends with eliminations for a final group of girls, now heading for Los Angeles in the next episode.
| 136 | 4 | "Das große Umstyling" | 5 March 2015 |
Upon arrival in Los Angeles, the girls get to know their accommodation during the next weeks. Since Daniela reached the house first, she was selected by the jury as "group leader". Heidi later gathers them in a nondescript warehouse for the big style and hair makeover. Drama ensues especially from Erica. They also shoot their sedcards with Kristian Schuller.: Quit: Annabel Paasch & Sarah Kocar; Eliminated: Ariana Xhatova & Laura Weidner; Featured photographer: Kristian Schuller
| 137 | 5 | "The First Shooting (Das erste Shooting)" | 12 March 2015 |
The color yellow is the theme of this week's shooting for Cosmopolitan. In turn each of the girls is photographed as part of a small group on a Los Angeles back-lot. Heidi and the judges reveal a new mode of operation in this year's GNTM edition: Under the moniker "World of Topmodel", each week some of the girls are sent to real castings in diverse locations across the globe - this week, three contestants are sent to London, to audition for a job offered by a German lifestyle magazine.: Booked for job: Laura Dünninger & Katharina Wandrowsky; Bottom four: Adriane Sutsch, Daniela Wolking, Lena Stockhausen & Sandy Provazek; Eliminated: Adriane Sutsch; Featured photographer: Kristian Schuller; Featured client: Joy
| 138 | 6 | "In Dizzy Height (In schwindelerregender Höhe)" | 19 March 2015 |
An L.A. airport serves as the location for the "Helicopter Shoot", a remake of a photo challenge from a previous cycle. This week's "World of Topmodel" job is in Dubai and Ajsa, Sara and Varisa fly over, Varisa being handicapped with bruised knees injured during the helicopter shoot just before leaving. Ajsa and Varisa are booked for the campaign with Amato Couture. The other girls do a photo challenge recreating childhood photos, with Jüli winning the challenge. They are also fitted into Wolfgang Joop's designs, presenting them at the elimination catwalk. Jovana and Lena are eliminated, while Daniela and Sara land in the bottom two. In the end, Daniela is eliminated as well.: Booked for job: Ajsa Selimovic & Varisa Caluk; Challenge winner: Jüli Ürküt; First eliminated: Jovana Bulic & Lena Stockhausen; Bottom two: Daniela Wolking & Sara Faste; Second eliminated: Daniela Wolking; Featured photographer: Kristian Schuller; Featured client: Amato Couture
| 139 | 7 | "Body painting (Das Bodypainting)" | 26 March 2015 |
This week's "World of Topmodel" holds a one-day-trip to Oahu, Hawaii for three of the girls: among them Erica, who is not selected in the casting for Surfer Magazine's photo shoot and resorts to drama. Back in L.A. the troupe is faced with the next photo challenge: a colorful body-painting shooting in a West L.A. studio loft. Overshadowed by Erica's bad mood, the girls blame her for ruining the shooting for all of them. The episode ends with the obligatory "live walk", the challenge here is the catwalk is suspended between a stack of sea shipping container, 42ft above ground. Judge Wolfgang Joop is absent for the entire episode.: Booked for job: Darya Strelnikova & Jüli Ürküt; Challenge winner & immune from elimination: Anuthida Ploypetch & Jüli Ürküt; First eliminated: Irene Pichler & Neele Busse; Bottom two: Erica Santos Silva & Lisa Bärmann; Second eliminated: None; Featured photographer: Kristian Schuller; Featured client: Surfers magazine
| 140 | 8 | "Underwater (Unter Wasser)" | 2 April 2015 |
"World of Topmodel" is a casting for a blouse manufacturer in Milan, Italy. Darya, Lisa and Varisa are invited, with Varisa booking the job. Lisa is however later asked to join a group shot. This, among other things, causes a lot of drama from Darya. Three challenges follow: an underwater / water-tank shoot with Schuller, where Kiki, Katharina and Anuthida produce great pictures, a "water-splashing" shoot with a stunt driver on an L.A. parking lot, where Varisa and Vanessa win themselves immunity, and the usual live walk on 8th & Hope's Helipad, combined with a styling game where each of the girls is asked to select an outfit for her teammate. Wolfgang Joop is absent for the entire episode (reported sick).: Booked for job: Varisa Caluk; Challenge winner & immune from elimination: Vanessa Fuchs & Varisa Caluk; First eliminated: Erica Santos Silva; Bottom two: Lisa Bärmann & Sandy Provazek; Second eliminated: None; Featured photographer: Kristian Schuller; Special guests: Erin Wasson; Featured client: 0039 Italy
| 141 | 9 | "Pure adrenaline (Adrenalin pur)" | 9 April 2015 |
Kristian Schuller stages an American Football shoot. The "World of Topmodel" trip is a flight to Auckland, New Zealand, where Anuthida, Darya, Jüli, Katharina and Vanessa attend a casting for an editorial and cover shoot for Remix Magazine, with Darya and Anuthida booked, and compete for a gig as catwalk model presenting Heidi Klum's own brand of lingerie, where Darya, Anuthida and Katharina are booked, with Anuthida being chosen to close the show. The episode centers on drama, as Varisa is said to be bullying some of the other girls. At panel the girls have the opportunity to save one girl. Jüli is saved with having one more vote than Sandy. Sandy and Varisa are eliminated for their weak performance during this week.: Booked for job: Anuthida Ploypetch (x2), Darya Strelnikova (x2) & Katharina Wandrowsky; Immune from elimination: Jüli Ürküt; First bottom two: Sandy Provazek & Vanessa Fuchs; First eliminated: Sandy Provazek; Second bottom two: Laura Dünninger & Varisa Caluk; Second eliminated: Varisa Caluk; Featured photographer: Kristian Schuller; Special guests: Toni Garrn; Featured clients: Heidi Klum Intimates & Remix Magazine
| 142 | 10 | "Bubble Gum" | 16 April 2015 |
Heidi opens the episode with a so-called Out-of-bed challenge - each girl is being photographed just after waking up. World of Topmodel is a cover shoot for Shape magazine, executed later on in Miami, FL, after a casting in L.A, where Laura, Darya and Kiki reach the second round. In the end, Darya books the job, much to Laura's disappointment. Kristian Schuller does a camera test with each of the girls, giving them a few lines and some simple acting instructions in a spec bubble-gum commercial, where Anuthida performs best with Laura being second. The girls do training for cover shoots with having one high fashion and a body shot. Anuthida who has started to earn her reputation as a favorite the week before is deemed best along with Jüli and Katharina. Laura is surprisingly eliminated for having said to want to leave the competition at several times and in spite of her strong week. Sara, who the judges feel is not ready yet, is eliminated second. One segment centers on Anuthida who is reunited with her father after 15 years while he lived in Las Vegas without them having stayed in contact.: Booked for job: Darya Strelnikova; Eliminated: Laura Dünninger & Sara Faste; Featured photographer: Kristian Schuller; Featured client: Shape Germany
| 143 | 11 | "Bald Heads (Das Glatzenshooting)" | 23 April 2015 |
The episode's first segment is a recap of Anuthida's family-reunion from last week. Heidi inspects all the girls' social media accounts, where Darya and Ajsa receive bad critique for their pictures. Katharina wins the challenge to take a new photo in LA for social media. This week's casting is for Opel, where Anuthida is booked for the important commercial. Kristian Schuller then challenges the girls in a mannequin-themed shoot where each girl receives a bold head by special-effects makeup. The shoot turns out to be especially challenging for Darya who carried over a bad mood from the previous segment where Heidi coached the girls in social media etiquette. Back at the villa, Wolfgang Joop asks the girls to style an outfit for Heidi, the reward is an expensive dress from a famous designer that Heidi has worn as well. Vanessa's outfit wins the challenge with Katharina being second. Vanessa therefore gets to wear Heidi's red dress to the elimination (all the other girls wear black Haute Couture outfits) and gets to close the show. As usual, the episode closes with a live walk, where only Anuthida, Katharina and Jüli receive good critique, while Darya is heavily critiqued for her unprofessional mood at the shoot and during the entire week. Vanessa and Kiki are critiqued for their walks. Ajsa is critiqued for her unprofessional smile when presenting Haute Couture. Lisa performs weak at the photo shoot and on the runway. Ajsa, Vanessa, Kiki and Lisa land in the bottom four. Lisa and Kiki even in the bottom two. When Lisa reaches the next round Kiki thinks she is eliminated but she is surprised by the judges.: Challenge winners: Katharina Wandrowsky & Vanessa Fuchs; Booked for job: Anuthida Ploypetch; Bottom four: Ajsa Selimovic, Kiki Hölzl, Lisa Bärmann & Vanessa Fuchs; Eliminated: None; Featured photographer: Kristian Schuller; Special guests: Zach King; Featured client: Opel
| 144 | 12 | "The Dancing (Das Tanzshooting)" | 30 April 2015 |
First, Heidi does mail bag with the girls. Then, three are flying over to New York for a Fashion Week casting (World of Topmodel). Back in L.A. the troupe is being coached for an upcoming shoot with Kristian. A choreographer instructs them in doing some basic routines. Again, room for drama between Darya and Kiki. After the shoot, Heidi chooses Katharina (with Vanessa being second) to have performed best. Anuthida struggles with the male models that are part of the shoot. The live walk is inspired by the classic Singing in the Rain, with artificial rain pouring down on the runway. Most of the girls receive negative feedback for their walk performances, but Heidi especially praises Lisa and Ajsa for having understood the briefing. In the end, Kiki is eliminated for her weak performance at both walk and photo shoot.: Booked for job: Anuthida Ploypetch & Lisa Bärmann; Eliminated: Kiki Hölzl; Featured photographer: Kristian Schuller; Featured client: Roberto Lòpez Etxberrìa
| 145 | 13 | "Clear the Ring (Manege frei)" | 7 May 2015 |
The episode starts with Heidi surprising the girls and cooking "Spinatknödel" with them, just before Kiki has to leave the villa. The next day, there is a casting for Gillette/Venus. Vanessa, Anuthida and Katharina are booked for the job and shoot a commercial. At the photo shoot, each girl is photographed in a specific circus-themed setting. Vanessa is deemed best by Kristian Schuller (followed by Darya). Ajsa and Katharina also perform well while Jüli, Anuthida and Lisa struggle. The girls that were not booked for the job go through a two-part challenge: First, they are interviewed by Steven Gätjen; after that, the girls simulate a red carpet moment. Lisa wins the challenge and accompanies Wolfgang to an Oscar party. At the elimination walk, the girls are required to take off their outfits' jackets while walking through a confetti rain. During the finale, Lisa slips badly. Vanessa, Darya and Katharina reach the semi-final directly, while Anuthida is criticized for her weak performance this week, but also makes the semi-final due to her job. Next, Jüli is eliminated for her bad week. Ajsa reaches the semi-final as well, having scored a good week. Lisa is eliminated second.: Challenge winner: Lisa Bärmann; Booked for job: Anuthida Ploypetch, Katharina Wandrowsky & Vanessa Fuchs; Eliminated: Jüli Ürküt & Lisa Bärmann; Featured photographer: Kristian Schuller; Special guests: Kate Upton; Featured client: Gillette Venus
| 146 | 14 | "Das Halbfinale" | 10 May 2015 |
In contrast to previous cycles, the semi-final episode is a small scale live-on-tape show set in an old church. Heidi and the judges present this week's episode in segments, intertwined with live-show style interviews and sentiments from friends and family. The episode's first job is the cover shoot for Cosmopolitan magazine, where all girls perform well. Afterwards, every girl is given an Opel Adam. They then fly to New York where each girl has to act in a New York street scene for Maybelline. Vanessa wins this job and shoots a campaign for the brand. Flying over to Paris, the girls compete again, this time for participation in Wolfgang Joop's Wunderkind runway show. Vanessa wins. The episode closes with a live walk in front of the jury, and much critique for Darya, who is eliminated.: Booked for job: Vanessa Fuchs (x2); Bottom two: Ajsa Selimovic & Darya Strelnikova; Eliminated: Darya Strelnikova; Featured photographer: Christian Anwander; Special guest: Susanne Bohl; Featured client: Maybelline New York & Wunderkind
| 147 | 15 | "The Finale, Part 1 (Das Finale, Teil 1)" | 14 May 2015 |
The live show in Mannheim's SAP Arena was opened by the four finalists, leading into an opening act with the whole cycle 10 cast walking the stage's catwalk and Jason Derulo performing his new single. Heidi entered the stage via show lift from the ceiling and her fellow judges were introduced in an equally dramatic act. The first live walk followed, where each of the finalists had to act doll-like first and then present a matching thematic walk, followed by Katharina's elimination from the competition. Just before the show entered the next act, after about an hour of airtime, Heidi led over to an irregular commercial break, followed by a segment of clips from the previous episodes. The remainder of the show was canceled and ProSieben aired a rerun of The Blind Side. Tweets and news coverage spread the information that the show was stopped and the location evacuated due to a bomb threat. ProSieben later officially confirmed they would not carry on with the finale show. As it was later revealed, Jüli had won the online voting between the girls who didn't reach the final and thus would have been the girl to open the top 18 walk. The day following the finale, it was announced that the new pre-recorded finale would air on 28 May. Viewers who had purchased tickets for the live final had their money reimbursed.: Top 18 walk opener: Jüli Ürküt; Final four: Ajsa Selimovic, Anuthida Ploypetch, Katharina Wandrowsky & Vanessa Fuchs; Eliminated: Katharina Wandrowsky; Special guests: Jason Derulo (announced: Alisar Ailabouni, Lovelyn Enebechi, Lena, Lena Gercke, Stefanie Giesinger, Luisa Hartema, Jennifer Hof, Barbara Meier, Olly Murs & Sara Nuru)
| 148 | 16 | "The Finale, Part 2 (Das Finale, Teil 2)" | 28 May 2015 |
The live finale continued in New York City after the original finale had to be postponed. The winners from cycles past, with the exception of Jana Beller who was absent due to a bereavement, made an appearance for the final show. Vanessa was declared Germany's Next Topmodel.: Final three: Ajsa Selimovic, Anuthida Ploypetch & Vanessa Fuchs; Eliminated: Ajsa Selimovic; Final two: Anuthida Ploypetch & Vanessa Fuchs; Germany's Next Topmodel: Vanessa Fuchs

== Summaries ==
=== Results table ===
| Place | Model | Episodes | | | | | | | | | | | | | |
| Place | Model | 4 (Note: Prior to the start of episode 4, Annabel and Sarah decided to quit the competition.) | 5 | 6 | 7 (Note: In episode 7, Anuthida and Juli won the challenge and were granted immunity from elimination.) | 8 (Note: In episode 8, Vanessa and Varisa won the challenge and were granted immunity from elimination.) | 9 (Note: In episode 9, Jüli was voted by the girls to be granted immunity from elimination.) | 10 | 11 (Note: In episode 11, Ajsa, Kiki, Lisa, and Vanessa landed in the bottom four but were saved, which resulted in a non-elimination.) | 12 | 13 | 14 | 15 (Note: Episode 15 was the original live finale of the season. In a first for the show and the franchise, the finale had to be canceled after the police were notified of a possible bomb threat. Everyone in the arena had to be evacuated, and the remainder of the show had to be carried out later in a new episode with the remaining three contestants.) | 16 | |
|---|---|---|---|---|---|---|---|---|---|---|---|---|---|---|---|
| 1 | Vanessa | SAFE | SAFE | SAFE | SAFE | IMM | LOW | SAFE | LOW | SAFE | SAFE | SAFE | SAFE | SAFE | WIN |
| 2 | Anuthida | SAFE | SAFE | SAFE | IMM | SAFE | SAFE | SAFE | SAFE | SAFE | SAFE | SAFE | LOW | LOW | OUT |
| 3 | Ajsa | SAFE | SAFE | SAFE | SAFE | SAFE | SAFE | SAFE | LOW | SAFE | SAFE | LOW | SAFE | OUT | |
| 4 | Katharina | SAFE | SAFE | SAFE | SAFE | SAFE | SAFE | SAFE | SAFE | SAFE | SAFE | SAFE | OUT | | |
| 5 | Darya | SAFE | SAFE | SAFE | SAFE | SAFE | SAFE | SAFE | SAFE | SAFE | SAFE | OUT | | | |
| 6–7 | Jüli | SAFE | SAFE | SAFE | IMM | SAFE | IMM | SAFE | SAFE | SAFE | OUT | | | | |
| 6–7 | Lisa | SAFE | SAFE | SAFE | LOW | LOW | SAFE | SAFE | LOW | SAFE | OUT | | | | |
| 8 | Kiki | SAFE | SAFE | SAFE | SAFE | SAFE | LOW | SAFE | LOW | OUT | | | | | |
| 9–10 | Laura D. | SAFE | SAFE | SAFE | SAFE | SAFE | SAFE | OUT | | | | | | | |
| 9–10 | Sara | SAFE | SAFE | LOW | SAFE | SAFE | SAFE | OUT | | | | | | | |
| 11–12 | Sandy | SAFE | LOW | SAFE | SAFE | LOW | OUT | | | | | | | | |
| 11–12 | Varisa | SAFE | SAFE | SAFE | SAFE | IMM | OUT | | | | | | | | |
| 13 | Erica | SAFE | SAFE | SAFE | LOW | OUT | | | | | | | | | |
| 14–15 | Irene | LOW | SAFE | SAFE | OUT | | | | | | | | | | |
| 14–15 | Neele | SAFE | SAFE | SAFE | OUT | | | | | | | | | | |
| 16–18 | Daniela | SAFE | LOW | OUT | | | | | | | | | | | |
| 16–18 | Jovana | SAFE | SAFE | OUT | | | | | | | | | | | |
| 16–18 | Lena | SAFE | LOW | OUT | | | | | | | | | | | |
| 19 | Adriane | LOW | OUT | | | | | | | | | | | | |
| 20–21 | Ariana | OUT | | | | | | | | | | | | | |
| 20–21 | Laura W. | OUT | | | | | | | | | | | | | |
| 22–23 | Annabel | QUIT | | | | | | | | | | | | | |
| 22–23 | Sarah | QUIT | | | | | | | | | | | | | |

The contestant quit the competition
The contestant was immune from elimination
The contestant was in danger of elimination
The contestant was eliminated
The contestant won the competition

=== Photo shoot guide ===
- Episode 4 photo shoot: Sedcard
- Episode 5 photo shoot: Construction workers for Cosmopolitan
- Episode 6 photo shoot: Helicopter on a rooftop
- Episode 7 photo shoot: Tribal powder covered in body paint
- Episode 8 photo shoot: Underwater couture
- Episode 9 photo shoot: Football editorial
- Episode 10 commercial: Bubble gum / Energy drink
- Episode 11 photo shoot: Bald editorial
- Episode 12 photo shoot: Dancing with fabric
- Episode 13 photo shoot: Circus editorial
- Episode 14 photo shoot: Cosmopolitan covers
