= Germany's Next Topmodel season 11 =

Germany's Next Topmodel
- Season 11
- Judges: Heidi Klum; Thomas Hayo; Michael Michalsky
- No. of contestants: 24
- Winner: Kim Hnizdo
- No. of episodes: 15

Release
- Original network: ProSieben
- Original release: 4 February – 12 May 2016

Season chronology
- ← Previous; Season 10 Next → Season 12

The eleventh season of Germany's Next Topmodel aired on German television network ProSieben from 4 February to 12 May 2016.

Thomas Hayo returns as a judge alongside new addition Michael Michalsky, who replaces Wolfgang Joop. This season also introduces a new format featuring teams and a battle concept. This panel of judges and format would remain in place for the following two seasons.

The winner of the competition was 20-year-old Kim Hnizdo from Bad Homburg vor der Höhe, representing Team Michael. Her prizes include:

- A modeling contract with Günther Klum's OneEins GmbH Management.
- A cover and spread in the German edition of Cosmopolitan.
- A cash prize worth €100,000.
- An Opel Adam

The international destinations for this season were set in Lanzarote, Fuerteventura, Madrid, Milan, Los Angeles, New York City, Miami, Sydney, Shanghai and Majorca.

== Contestants ==
(ages stated are at start of contest)

Team	Contestant	Age	Height	Hometown	Finish	Place
Michael	Luisa Bolghiran	19	—N/a	Cologne	Episode 2	24 (quit)
Michael	Fred Riss	17	1.75 m (5 ft 9 in)	Ratzeburg	Episode 2	23
Thomas	Laura-Penelope Baumgärtner	19	1.71 m (5 ft 7 1/2 in)	Berg, Switzerland	Episode 2	22 (quit)
Thomas	Saskia Böhlcke	18	1.74 m (5 ft 8 1/2 in)	Hanover	Episode 2	21
Michael	Sophie Schweer	19	1.76 m (5 ft 9 1/2 in)	Ahlen	Episode 3	20-19
Michael	Shirin Kelly	24	1.74 m (5 ft 8 1/2 in)	Neutraubling	Episode 3	20-19
Michael	Cindy Unger	20	1.76 m (5 ft 9 1/2 in)	Dresden	Episode 4	18
Thomas	Jennifer Daschner	17	1.76 m (5 ft 9 1/2 in)	Sulzbach-Rosenberg	Episode 5	17-16
Thomas	Laura Bräutigam	16	1.75 m (5 ft 9 in)	Murr	Episode 5	17-16
Michael	Christin Götzke	17	1.76 m (5 ft 9 1/2 in)	Siegen	Episode 6	15-14
Michael	Yusra Babekr-Ali	18	1.74 m (5 ft 8 1/2 in)	Munich	Episode 6	15-14
Thomas	Lara-Kristin Bayer	16	1.80 m (5 ft 11 in)	Essen	Episode 7	13
Thomas	Camilla Cavalli	18	1.79 m (5 ft 10 1/2 in)	Offenbach am Main	Episode 8	12
Thomas	Julia Wulf	20	1.76 m (5 ft 9 1/2 in)	Hamburg	Episode 9	11 (quit)
Michael	Laura-Franziska Blank	21	1.78 m (5 ft 10 in)	Altenstadt	Episode 9	10
Michael	Laura Bleicher	19	1.80 m (5 ft 11 in)	Ingolstadt	Episode 10	9
Michael	Luana Florea	19	1.78 m (5 ft 10 in)	Bucharest, Romania	Episode 11	8
Thomas	Elena Kilb	19	1.80 m (5 ft 11 in)	Hof	Episode 13	7
Michael	Lara Helmer	20	1.76 m (5 ft 9 1/2 in)	Munich	Episode 14	6
Thomas	Taynara Silva Wolf	19	1.74 m (5 ft 8 1/2 in)	Stadtlohn	Episode 15	5
Thomas	Jasmin Lekudere	20	1.77 m (5 ft 9 1/2 in)	Dornbirn, Austria	Episode 15	4
Thomas	Fata Hasanovic (Note: Fata previously competed in the ninth season of the series, where she placed twenty-third to twentieth.)	20	1.76 m (5 ft 9 1/2 in)	Berlin	Episode 15	3
Thomas	Elena Carriere	19	1.77 m (5 ft 9 1/2 in)	Hamburg	Episode 15	2
Michael	Kim Hnizdo	19	1.75 m (5 ft 9 in)	Bad Homburg von der Höhe	Episode 15	1

== Episode summaries ==
No. overall	No. in season	Title	Original release date
149	1	"Neue Regeln. Neue Jury. Neuer Style."	4 February 2016
This was the casting episode. The top 50 girls were narrowed down to the top 30 after meeting the judges for the first time. The top 30 contestants then had their first live runway show. After the runway concluded, 24 contestants were chosen to advance into the competition. The contestants were divided into two teams of twelve. Half of them would be in Team Michael and the other half in Team Thomas.
150	2	"Zwei Teams, zwei Inseln"	11 February 2016
The contestants were divided into two teams and sent to Lanzarote and Fuerteventura, where they faced challenging shoots and runway challenges. At elimination, Fred and Saskia were sent home, while Laura Penelope chose to leave rather than cut her dreadlocks. Luisa had previously withdrawn from the competition for personal reasons, which was not shown on the episode.: Quit: Luisa Bolghiran; Challenge winner: Shirin Kelly; Best performer: Cindy Unger; Bottom five: Fred Riss, Lara-Kristin Bayer, Laura Penelope Baumgärtner, Saskia Böhlcke & Sophie Schweer; Quit: Laura Penelope Baumgärtner; Eliminated: Fred Riss & Saskia Böhlcke; Featured photographer: Matt McCabe; Special guests: Toni Garrn
151	3	"Das Sirupshooting"	18 February 2016
After castings in Madrid and Milan, the teams reunited in Los Angeles.: Booked for job: Julia Wulf (x2), Lara Helmer, Shirin Kelly & Yusra Babekr-Ali; Best performer: Lara Helmer; Eliminated: Shirin Kelly & Sophie Schweer; Featured photographer: Blake Little; Featured clients: Dora Abody, Haze&Glory, Maria Escoté, & Tom Rebl
152	4	"Das große Umstyling"	25 February 2016
The contestants underwent dramatic makeovers, causing tension among some of the girls. They then participated in a sedcard photoshoot and a challenge creating speed camera B&W pictures, which Lara-Kristin won, earning immunity. At elimination, the girls showcased Haute Couture dresses, with Kim and Julia impressing the judges. Cindy was ultimately eliminated due to her poor performance.: Challenge winner & immune from elimination: Lara-Kristin Bayer; Eliminated: Cindy Unger; Featured photographer: Max Montgomery; Special guest: Andreja Pejić & Wendy Iles
153	5	"Es geht hoch hinaus"	3 March 2016
The contestants participated in a high-altitude swing shoot, with Fata impressing Heidi. The teams then went to separate locations, with Team Thomas in New York City and Team Michael in Miami, where they faced various castings and challenges. At elimination, the girls walked a runway with pyrotechnics, and Jennifer and Laura were eliminated. Laura's departure prompted Jasmin to consider quitting, but she was convinced to stay.: Booked for job: Elena Kilb, Jasmin Lekudere, Julia Wulf, Taynara Silva Wolf & Luana Florea; Best performer: Fata Hasanovic; Eliminated: Jennifer Daschner & Laura Bräutigam; Featured photographer: Robert Erdmann; Special guest: Eva Cavalli; Featured client: Fashion Avenue News Magazine, Indie magazine, & Shape Germany
154	6	"Lasst die Puppen tanzen"	10 March 2016
The contestants were divided into groups for a themed photoshoot and later faced a runway challenge in ill-fitting shoes, which Team Michael won. At elimination, the girls walked the runway suspended like dolls, and Christin was eliminated due to poor performance. Yusra was also sent home after landing in the bottom two with Laura Franziska.: Booked for job: Team Michael; First eliminated: Christin Götzke; Bottom two: Laura Franziska Blank & Yusra Babekr-Ali; Second eliminated: Yusra Babekr-Ali; Featured photographer: Rankin; Special guests: Winnie Harlow
155	7	"Nackt im Dschungel"	17 March 2016
Team Michael attended a Berlin Fashion Week casting, with Luana booking the job and earning immunity. The teams then participated in a nude photoshoot in a Sydney jungle, with some girls hesitant to pose nude. At elimination, the girls walked a red carpet in front of the Sydney skyline, and Lara-Kristin was eliminated after landing in the bottom three with Camilla and Lara.: Booked for job & immune from elimination: Luana Florea; Bottom three: Camilla Cavalli, Lara Helmer & Lara-Kristin Bayer; Eliminated: Lara-Kristin Bayer; Featured photographer: Damian Bennett; Special guests: Michael Costello; Featured client: Maybelline New York
156	8	"Jetzt wird's heißkalt"	24 March 2016
The girls were shocked to see paparazzi pictures of last week's elimination, with Kim upset about a revealing photo. They then did an ice-themed photoshoot, where Fata excelled. After a beach fashion challenge won by Jasmin, the girls walked the runway as "space goddesses" at elimination. Camilla was ultimately eliminated after landing in the bottom two with Elena K.: Challenge winner: Jasmin Lekudere; Best performer: Fata Hasanovic; Bottom three: Camilla Cavalli, Elena Kilb & Laura Franziska Blank; Eliminated: Camilla Cavalli; Featured photographer: Henryk Lobacezwski
157	9	"Die Goldenen Zwanziger"	31 March 2016
The models attended a casting for Heidi's underwear line, with Elena C. booking the job. They then participated in a group photoshoot with snakes, where Jasmin impressed the judges and won a new Opel Adam. At elimination, the girls wore the same red dress, and Julia was sent home due to health issues. Laura Franziska was also eliminated after landing in the bottom three with Luana and Lara.: Booked for job: Elena Carrière; Quit: Julia Wulf; Best performer: Jasmin Lekudere; Bottom three: Lara Helmer, Laura Franziska Blank & Luana Florea; Eliminated: Laura Franziska Blank; Featured photographer: Adam Flipp & Mario Schmolka; Featured client: Heidi Klum Intimates
158	10	"Blind Marriage"	7 April 2016
The girls learned about working with male models and participated in a fashion film depicting a wedding ceremony, with Elena C. excelling. She later landed a job at a Philips casting. At elimination, the girls walked on treadmills, and Laura was sent home after landing in the bottom two with Lara.: Booked for job: Elena Carrière; Bottom three: Elena Kilb, Lara Helmer & Laura Bleicher; Eliminated: Laura Bleicher; Featured photographer: Christian Anwander; Special guests: Aladdin Ishmael, Del Keens, John Economou, Marcellus Williams; Featured client: Philips
159	11	"Blanker Horror"	14 April 2016
The girls attended a casting for the label, Boulezar with Jasmin booking the job. They then created outfits from Levi's clothes in a challenge, which Elena C. won. The photo shoot took place in a haunted mansion with a male model. At the live walk, the girls wore full-body B&W outfits, and Luana was eliminated after landing in the bottom two with Lara. Heidi chose Kim and Elena C. to attend the amfAR gala in New York.: Booked for job: Jasmin Lekudere; Challenge winner: Elena Carrière; Bottom two: Lara Helmer & Luana Florea; Eliminated: Luana Florea; Featured photographer: Russell James; Featured client: Boulezar
160	12	"Tränen über Tränen"	21 April 2016
Kim and Elena C. attended the amfAR gala with Heidi, and the girls then participated in a rain-themed photoshoot. Kim booked a job with Opel. The contestants' loved ones visited, and at the elimination, the girls walked the runway as Old Hollywood divas. In a surprise twist, their loved ones handed out photos, and no one was eliminated.: Booked for job: Kim Hnizdo; Eliminated: None; Featured photographer: Brian Bowen Smith; Special guests: Jay Z, Paris Hilton, Robert De Niro, Ryan Reynolds, Uma Thurman, & Zac Posen; Featured client: Opel
161	13	"Einzug ins Halbfinale"	28 April 2016
The girls attended a casting for Gillette Venus, with Fata booking the job. They then participated in a photoshoot with their family members, with Kim and Jasmin impressing Heidi. At elimination, the girls walked the runway as princesses, and Elena K. was eliminated after landing in the bottom four with Taynara, Lara, and Fata. Kim, Jasmin, and Elena C. advanced directly to the semifinals.: Booked for job: Fata Hasanovic; Bottom four: Elena Kilb, Fata Hasanovic, Lara Helmer & Taynara Silva Wolf; Eliminated: Elena Kilb; Featured photographer: Andrew Macpherson; Special guests: Patrick Karcher; Featured client: Gillette Venus
162	14	"Das Halbfinale"	5 May 2016
The girls participated in a Cosmopolitan cover shoot and created their own 3D action figures. They also showcased their own fashion shows, making it tough for Heidi to decide on the final contestants. Ultimately, Lara was eliminated, while Kim, Fata, and Elena C. advanced directly to the finale. Jasmin and Taynara also made it through, marking the first time five contestants reached the finale.: First eliminated: Lara Helmer; Bottom two: Jasmin Lekudere & Taynara Silva Wolf; Second eliminated: None; Featured photographer: Brian Bowen Smith; Special guest: Stefanie Giesinger & Susanne Bohl
163	15	"Das große Finale"	12 May 2016
The finalists attended castings in Shanghai, and before the first elimination, Elena came out as bisexual and revealed her crush on Kim. Taynara, Jasmin, and Fata were eliminated in successive rounds, and in the end, Kim was crowned the winner, with Elena placing second.: Booked for job: Elena Carrière (x2), Fata Hasanovic (x2), Kim Hnizdo (x2), Jasmin Lekudere (x2) & Taynara Silva Wolf; Final five: Elena Carrière, Fata Hasanovic, Jasmin Lekudere, Kim Hnizdo & Taynara Silva Wolf; Bottom two: Fata Hasanovic & Taynara Silva Wolf; Eliminated: Taynara Silva Wolf; Top 21 walk opener: Laura Bleicher; Final four: Elena Carrière, Fata Hasanovic, Jasmin Lekudere & Kim Hnizdo; Eliminated: Jasmin Lekudere; Final three: Elena Carrière, Fata Hasanovic & Kim Hnizdo; Bottom two: Fata Hasanovic & Kim Hnizdo; Eliminated: Fata Hasanovic; Final two: Elena Carrière & Kim Hnizdo; Germany's Next Topmodel: Kim Hnizdo; Featured photographer: Kristian Schuller; Special guests: Jay Sean, Nick Jonas, Rebecca Mir, Sean Paul, & will.i.am; Featured clients: Alicia Lee, Blink Gallery, Cindy Soong, Fengyi Tan, Helen Lee, & Yuzzo

== Summaries ==
=== Results table ===
Team Thomas	Team Michael

Place	Model	Episodes																
Place	Model	2 (Note: Prior to the start of episode 2, Luisa decided to quit the competition. Later during the episode, Laura Penelope also decided to quit the competition.)	3	4 (Note: In Episode 4, Lara-Kristin won the challenge and was granted immunity from elimination.)	5	6	7 (Note: In Episode 7, Luana was booked for the job and was granted immunity from elimination.)	8	9 (Note: In Episode 9, Julia decided to quit the competition.)	10	11	12 (Note: Episode 12 was a non-elimination.)	13	14	15			
1	Kim	SAFE	SAFE	SAFE	SAFE	SAFE	SAFE	SAFE	SAFE	SAFE	SAFE	SAFE	SAFE	SAFE	SAFE	SAFE	SAFE	WIN
2	Elena C.	SAFE	SAFE	SAFE	SAFE	SAFE	SAFE	SAFE	SAFE	HIGH	SAFE	SAFE	SAFE	SAFE	SAFE	SAFE	SAFE	OUT
3	Fata	SAFE	SAFE	SAFE	HIGH	SAFE	SAFE	HIGH	SAFE	SAFE	SAFE	LOW	LOW	LOW	LOW	LOW	OUT	
4	Jasmin	SAFE	SAFE	SAFE	SAFE	SAFE	SAFE	SAFE	HIGH	SAFE	SAFE	SAFE	SAFE	LOW	LOW	OUT		
5	Taynara	SAFE	SAFE	SAFE	SAFE	SAFE	SAFE	SAFE	SAFE	SAFE	SAFE	SAFE	LOW	LOW	OUT			
6	Lara	SAFE	HIGH	SAFE	SAFE	SAFE	LOW	LOW	LOW	LOW	LOW	LOW	LOW	OUT				
7	Elena K.	SAFE	SAFE	SAFE	SAFE	SAFE	SAFE	LOW	LOW	LOW	SAFE	SAFE	OUT					
8	Luana	SAFE	SAFE	SAFE	SAFE	SAFE	IMM	SAFE	LOW	SAFE	OUT							
9	Laura Bl.	SAFE	SAFE	SAFE	SAFE	SAFE	SAFE	SAFE	SAFE	OUT								
10	Laura Franziska	SAFE	SAFE	SAFE	SAFE	LOW	SAFE	LOW	OUT									
11	Julia	SAFE	SAFE	SAFE	SAFE	SAFE	SAFE	SAFE	QUIT									
12	Camilla	SAFE	SAFE	SAFE	SAFE	SAFE	LOW	OUT										
13	Lara-Kristin	LOW	SAFE	IMM	SAFE	SAFE	OUT											
14–15	Christin	SAFE	SAFE	SAFE	SAFE	OUT												
14–15	Yusra	SAFE	SAFE	SAFE	SAFE	OUT												
16–17	Jennifer	SAFE	SAFE	SAFE	OUT													
16–17	Laura Br.	SAFE	SAFE	SAFE	OUT													
18	Cindy	HIGH	SAFE	OUT														
19–20	Shirin	SAFE	OUT															
19–20	Sophie	LOW	OUT															
21–22	Fred	OUT																
21–22	Saskia	OUT																
23	Laura Penelope	QUIT																
24	Luisa	QUIT																

The contestant won best photo
The contestant quit the competition
The contestant was immune from elimination
The contestant was in danger of elimination
The contestant was eliminated
The contestant won the competition

=== Photo shoot guide ===
- Episode 2 photo shoots: Swimwear on the beach; Sand dune in B&W
- Episode 3 photo shoot: Wearing swimwear covered in syrup
- Episode 4 photo shoot: Sedcards
- Episode 5 photo shoot: Swing couture
- Episode 6 photo shoot: Colorful outfits in groups
- Episode 7 photo shoot: Nude with animals in the jungle
- Episode 8 photo shoot: Ice fairies
- Episode 9 photo shoot: 20's lingerie in groups with a snake
- Episode 10 video shoot: Brides with an "ugly" model
- Episode 11 photo shoot: Exorcism with a male model
- Episode 12 photo shoot: 40's styling while crying in the rain
- Episode 13 photo shoot: Posing with family members
- Episode 14 photo shoot: Cosmopolitan covers
- Episode 15 photo shoot: Posing on the beach with inflatable toys
