= MLHLND =

Australian singer, music producer and fashion photographer

- Born: Max Wilkinson
- Genres: Pop
- Occupations: Singer, songwriter, producer, photographer
- Instruments: vocals; acoustic guitar; electric guitar; piano; keyboard; bass
- Years active: 2014–present
- Labels: Personal Best; Independent
- Website: mlhlnd.com

MLHLND is the stage name of Australian singer, songwriter, music producer and fashion photographer Max Wilkinson.

== Career ==
=== Solo and Die For You (2008–2013) ===
In 2008 after posting original tracks to Myspace, Wilkinson was scouted by Trevor Steel and Chris Johns of Sunday Morning Records to play lead guitar for the newly formed electro-pop band Die For You. In 2009, Die For You embarked on the nationwide Stack Is The New Black Tour supporting Australian pop-punk act Short Stack.

=== MLHLND (2014–present) ===
In 2013, Wilkinson began work on a new project in New York City with Autre Ne Veut producer Joel Ford. Returning to Australia as MLHLND, Wilkinson quickly signed a record deal with Personal Best Records and began releasing music. In October 2014, MLHLND released "Pretty", a soft single, to introduce himself as an artist and tease the upcoming release of his debut single.

MLHLND's debut single "Clothes Off" was released on 28 November 2014 to high critical acclaim. Mike Wass of Idolator called the track "a steamy bedroom romp", comparing MLHLND to an 80's Prince as he "really occupies an entirely new space with his dreamy synths, R&B-influenced vocal style and bold pop sensibility". Nic Kelly of EMI called the track "stunning", dubbing MLHLND "Australian pop's newest forward thinker". The single also gained commercial success, gathering over 200,000 plays on Spotify.

After his debut performance in 2015 at annual outdoor lighting festival Vivid Sydney, MLHLND continued releasing new music. To online and radio success, MLHLND released his debut EP Twenty First Century Love, Vol. I on 1 April 2016 exploring themes of love, lust and heartbreak. The single "Pure" was released off of Twenty First Century Love, Vol. I to online success, with a risque video of couples seen passionately kissing. "Closer", gained over 100,000 streams on Spotify.

Twenty First Century Love, Vol. II was released on 26 August 2016 with the single "Non Stop". Triple J's Dave Ruby Howard reviewed the lead single, stating "to borrow from Tracy Morgan, somebody's gonna get pregnant somewhere while this is on." MLHLND followed up the success of "Non Stop" with the single "Twenty First Century Love" being released on 5 May 2017. "Twenty First Century Love" has been featured in Season 12, Episode 15 of Germany's Next Top Model.

=== Fashion photography (2016–present) ===
In 2015, MLHLND began work extending his creative portfolio as a fashion photographer, having been featured in print publications Sticks & Stones Agency, Flake Mag, Baltisoul and Last Daze.

== Discography ==
=== Singles ===
- "Clothes Off" (2014)
- "Pure" (2016)
- "Non Stop" (2016)
- "Twenty First Century Love" (2017)

=== EPs ===
- Twenty First Century Love, Vol. I (2016)
- Twenty First Century Love, Vol. II (2016)
