= Germany's Next Topmodel season 12 =

Germany's Next Topmodel
- Season 12
- Judges: Heidi Klum; Thomas Hayo; Michael Michalsky
- No. of contestants: 28
- Winner: Céline Bethmann
- No. of episodes: 16

Release
- Original network: ProSieben
- Original release: 9 February – 25 May 2017

Season chronology
- ← Previous; Season 11 Next → Season 13

The twelfth season of Germany's Next Topmodel aired on German television network ProSieben from 9 February to 25 May 2017 under the catch phrase Are you ready?.

The judging panel remains unchanged, and the teams and battle concept remain the same. This season introduced the shoot-out, where two or more of the previous week's worst-performing models face an elimination duel during their next shoot.

The winner of this season was 18-year-old Céline Bethmann from Koblenz, representing Team Thomas. Her prizes include:

- A modeling contract with Günther Klum's OneEins GmbH Management worth €140,000.
- A cover and spread in the German edition of Cosmopolitan.
- A cash prize worth €100,000.
- An Opel Adam.

The international destinations for this season were set in Barcelona, Menorca, Majorca, Paris, Marseille, Los Angeles, New York City, Las Vegas and London.

== Contestants ==
(ages stated are at start of contest)

Team	Contestant	Age	Height	Hometown	Finish	Place
Thomas	Christina Wiessner	19	1.70 m (5 ft 7 in)	Holzkirchen	Episode 2	28–27
Michael	Saskia Mächler	19	1.72 m (5 ft 7 1/2 in)	Dortmund	Episode 2	28–27
Thomas	Elisa Weihmann	16	1.78 m (5 ft 10 in)	Königs Wusterhausen	Episode 2	26–25
Michael	Victoria Wanke	17	1.72 m (5 ft 7 1/2 in)	Friedrichshafen	Episode 2	26–25
Michael	Claudia Fiedler	22	1.78 m (5 ft 10 in)	Landau an der Isar	Episode 3	24
Michael	Milena Ziller	18	1.77 m (5 ft 9 1/2 in)	Stuttgart	Episode 3	23–21
Thomas	Chaline Bang	16	1.78 m (5 ft 10 in)	Stuhr	Episode 3	23–21
Michael	Kimberly Pereira	18	1.75 m (5 ft 9 in)	Hamburg	Episode 3	23–21
Thomas	Helena Fritz	18	1.75 m (5 ft 9 in)	Nebikon, Switzerland	Episode 4	20 (quit)
Thomas	Aissatou Niang	18	1.75 m (5 ft 9 in)	Garching	Episode 4	19
Michael	Deborah Lay	21	1.70 m (5 ft 7 in)	Köln	Episode 4	18
Michael	Melina Budde	19	1.80 m (5 ft 11 in)	Oberhausen	Episode 5	17
Thomas	Neele Bronst	20	1.75 m (5 ft 9 in)	Hamburg	Episode 6	16
Thomas	Julia Fux	20	1.78 m (5 ft 10 in)	Reichenthal, Austria	Episode 7	15
Thomas	Greta Faeser	21	1.78 m (5 ft 10 in)	Hamburg	Episode 8	14 (quit)
Michael	Julia Steyns	23	1.80 m (5 ft 11 in)	Trier	Episode 8	13
Michael	Soraya Eckes	17	1.78 m (5 ft 10 in)	Sylt	Episode 9	12
Michael	Giuliana Radermacher	20	1.78 m (5 ft 10 in)	Herbolzheim	Episode 10	11
Michael	Brenda Hübscher	23	1.83 m (6 ft 0 in)	Berlin	Episode 11	10
Thomas	Sabine Fischer	23	1.75 m (5 ft 9 in)	München	Episode 13	9
Michael	Anh Phuong Dinh Phan	25	1.78 m (5 ft 10 in)	Köln	Episode 14	8
Michael	Carina Zavline	19	1.71 m (5 ft 7 1/2 in)	Paris, France	Episode 14	7
Thomas	Lynn Petertonkoker	18	1.78 m (5 ft 10 in)	Beckum	Episode 15	6-5
Thomas	Maja Manczak	18	1.79 m (5 ft 10 1/2 in)	Langen	Episode 15	6-5
Michael	Leticia Wala-Ntuba	18	1.74 m (5 ft 8 1/2 in)	Ingolstadt	Episode 16	4
Michael	Romina Brennecke	20	1.84 m (6 ft 1/2 in)	Hambrücken	Episode 16	3
Thomas	Serlina Hohmann	22	1.78 m (5 ft 10 in)	Koblenz	Episode 16	2
Thomas	Céline Bethmann	18	1.81 m (5 ft 11 1/2 in)	Koblenz	Episode 16	1

== Episode summaries ==
No. overall	No. in season	Title	Original release date
164	1	"Ein Flughafen für #GNTM"	9 February 2017
The twelfth season of Germany's Next Top Model started with a casting where thousands of girls had applied. Only a few managed to move on to the next round. Afterwards, the girls had to prove themselves a second time and run on a treadmill before the jury. Céline, Deborah, Greta and Leticia got a ticket immediately. At the end of the week the girls had to lay down a walk in elegant dresses. Only 28 girls made it to the next week.
165	2	"Die Topmodel-Cruise beginnt"	16 February 2017
This week's challenge was to make a photo with a self-timer. The better one won a point for their team. The challenge was won by Team Michael. This week's photoshoot was a paddleboarding shoot in bikinis. After the photoshoot Heidi decided to throw Christina and Saskia out for their bad performances at the shoot. At elimination, Elisa was eliminated for being too young and Victoria for her bad performance at photoshoot and runway.: Challenge winner: Team Michael; Eliminated outside of panel: Christina Wiessner & Saskia Mächler; Best performer: Giuliana Radermacher & Julia Fux; Eliminated: Elisa Weihmann & Victoria Wanke; Featured photographer: Max Montgomery
166	3	"Ein Shooting in extremen Höhen"	23 February 2017
The girls had a photoshoot on a box at dizzying heights. Afterwards, Heidi announced that Claudia is out. At elimination, Milena was eliminated for her worse performance at the photoshoot, Chaline for being to young and Kimberly for her bad performance at both, runway and photoshoot.: Shoot-out: Claudia Fiedler & Neele Bronst; Eliminated outside of panel: Claudia Fiedler; Best performer: Carina Zavline; Eliminated: Chaline Bang, Kimberly Pereira, & Milena Ziller; Featured photographer: Max Montgomery; Special guests: Mac Folkes & Nikeata Thompson
167	4	"Das große Umstyling"	2 March 2017
This week was the big makeover. Helena refused her makeover and decided to quit the competition. This week's photoshoot was the sedcard shoot. After the shoot Aissatou was eliminated outside of judging panel. At elimination, Deborah, Julia, Lynn, Melina, Neele and Sabine landed in the bottom six. In the end, Deborah was eliminated for her weak week.: Quit: Helena Fritz; Shoot-out: Aissatou Niang & Brenda Hübscher; Eliminated outside of panel: Aissatou Niang; Bottom six: Deborah Lay, Julia Fux, Lynn Petertonkoker, Melina Budde, Neele Bronst & Sabine Fischer; Eliminated: Deborah Lay; Featured photographer: Brian Bowen Smith; Special guest: Wendy Iles
168	5	"Challenges in der Wüste"	9 March 2017
This week's photoshoot was a Desert shoot. Carina, Céline, Maja and Serlina were booked for a casting. Céline was booked for the job. At elimination, Melina and Sabine landed in the bottom two. In the end, Melina was eliminated.: Booked for job: Céline Bethmann; Bottom two: Melina Budde & Sabine Fischer; Eliminated: Melina Budde; Featured photographer: Kristian Schuller; Special guests: Nadine Leopold, Mac Folkes, Nikeata Thompson & Christina Hammer; Featured client: Shape Germany
169	6	"Als Burlesque Girls in Las Vegas"	16 March 2017
Carina, Giuliana and Greta were invited for a casting in Paris. Greta was booked for the job. This week's challenge was to pose in groups in front of a car is driving. This challenge was won by Team Michael. The photoshoot this week was a burlesque shoot. At elimination, Giuliana and Neele landed in the bottom two. In the end, Heidi decided to eliminate Neele from the competition.: Booked for job: Greta Faeser; Challenge winner: Team Michael; Best performer: Brenda Hübscher; Bottom two: Giuliana Radermacher & Neele Bronst; Eliminated: Neele Bronst; Featured photographer: Ellen von Unwerth; Special guests: Felix Schmitt; Featured client: Kaviar Gauche
170	7	"Sexy Graffiti Shooting"	23 March 2017
This week's challenge was to dance a choreography in groups. This challenge was won by Serlina. Anh, Greta, Lynn and Sabine were booked for a casting and Sabine was booked for the job. This week's photoshoot was a nude graffiti shoot. At elimination, Giuliana and Julia F. landed in the bottom two and Julia F. was the next to leave the competition.: Booked for job: Sabine Fischer; Challenge winner: Serlina Hohmann; Bottom two: Giuliana Radermacher & Julia Fux; Eliminated: Julia Fux; Featured photographer: Christian Anwander; Special guests: Mac Folkes & Nikeata Thompson; Featured client: Joy
171	8	"Der harte Kampf um Jobs"	30 March 2017
The models flew to Berlin at Berlin Fashion Week. Anh, Brenda, Carina, Romina, Sabine and Serlina were booked for a job. Before the photoshoot Greta decided to quit the competition. This week's photoshoot was to pose with their mentors and dogs. Every girl had only 8 minutes. The best team was Team Michael. The challenge prize was to decide who should be immune from the elimination. The girls opted for Giuliana. At elimination, Julia St, Leticia, Lynn, Maja and Soraya landed in the bottom five. In the end, Julia St. was eliminated.: Booked for job: Anh Phuong Dinh Phan, Brenda Hübscher, Carina Zavline, Romina Brennecke, Sabine Fischer & Serlina Hohmann; Quit: Greta Faeser; Challenge winner: Team Michael; Immune from elimination: Giuliana Radermacher; Bottom five: Julia Steyns, Leticia Wala-Ntuba, Lynn Petertonkoker, Maja Manczak & Soraya Eckes; Eliminated: Julia Steyns; Featured photographer: Thomas Patton; Special guest: Michael Costello; Featured client: About You, Lana Mueller Couture, Marcel Ostertag, & Maybelline New York
172	9	"Boys! Boys! Boys!"	6 April 2017
The week starts with a teaching about posing with boys. Leticia, Sabine and Soraya were booked for a casting and Sabine was booked for the job. This week's photoshoot was to pose with a male model wearing lingerie. At elimination, Brenda, Serlina and Soraya landed in the bottom three. In the end, Soraya was eliminated from the competition.: Booked for job: Sabine Fischer; Best performer: Leticia Wala-Ntuba; Bottom three: Brenda Hübscher, Serlina Hohmann & Soraya Eckes; Eliminated: Soraya Eckes; Featured photographer: Rankin; Special guest: Wolfgang Joop; Featured client: as much again Lookbook
173	10	"Der Einzug in die Top 10"	13 April 2017
This week's photoshoot was a fashion video shoot with Shaun Ross. Some of the girls did really well but others did not do so well. Anh, Leticia and Romina were booked for a casting and Leticia was booked for the job. At elimination, Brenda, Giuliana and Sabine landed in the bottom three. Sabine was safe, leaving Brenda and Giuliana in the bottom two. In the end, Giuliana was eliminated.: Booked for job: Leticia Wala-Ntuba; Best performer: Carina Zavline; Bottom three: Brenda Hübscher, Giuliana Radermacher & Sabine Fischer; Eliminated: Giuliana Radermacher; Featured director: Lance Drake; Special guests: Shaun Ross, Mac Folkes & Nikeata Thompson; Featured client: Refinery29
174	11	"Enthüllung: Die Models im Interview"	20 April 2017
The week started with a teaching on how to behave at an interview. This week's photoshoot was posing in a big plastic bubble. Leticia and Lynn flew to New York City after being chosen by Heidi to go to the amfAR Gala. They did not come back because of a snowstorm in New York. That's why Heidi decided that Leticia and Lynn were secure from elimination. At elimination, Brenda was eliminated for her bad performance at photoshoot and runway. After Brenda's elimination, Anh and Sabine landed in the bottom two. But neither of them were eliminated.: Best performer: Serlina Hohmann; Immune from elimination: Leticia Wala-Ntuba & Lynn Petertonkoker; Eliminated: Brenda Hübscher; Bottom two: Anh Phuong Dinh Phan & Sabine Fischer; Eliminated: None; Featured photographer: Markus Schäfer; Special guests: Julia Bauer, Patricia Riekel & Philipp Plein
175	12	"Abgedreht: Als Alice im Puppenhäuschen"	27 April 2017
This week's photoshoot was to pose as Alice from Alice in Wonderland. The girls had a casting for Opel Adam and Carina was booked for the job. At elimination, nobody was eliminated.: Booked for job: Carina Zavline; Best performer: Lynn Petertonkoker; Eliminated: None; Featured photographer: Kimberley Gordon; Special guests: Giuseppe Fiordispina; Featured client: Opel
176	13	"Panik beim Unterwasser Shooting"	4 May 2017
This week started with a casting for Gillette Venus and Céline was booked for the job. This week's photoshoot was to pose as underwater goddesses. At elimination, Sabine was eliminated for her bad performance at the shoot. Later, Anh and Romina landed in the bottom two. No one was eliminated, but both must have go to the Shoot out next week.: Booked for job: Céline Bethmann; Best performer: Serlina Hohmann; First eliminated: Sabine Fischer; Bottom two: Anh Phuong Dinh Phan & Romina Brennecke; Second eliminated: None; Featured photographer: Peter Taras; Special guest: Patrick Karcher; Featured client: Gillette Venus
177	14	"Der Einzug ins Halbfinale"	11 May 2017
The week started with a teaching about showing emotions. This week's photoshoot was to portraying emotions in Black-and-white. After the photoshoot Heidi announced that Anh is out. At elimination, Carina and Serlina landed in the bottom two. In the end, Carina was eliminated.: Shoot-out: Anh Phuong Dinh Phan & Romina Brennecke; Eliminated outside of panel: Anh Phuong Dinh Phan; Best performer: Leticia Wala-Ntuba; Bottom two: Carina Zavline & Serlina Hohmann; Eliminated: Carina Zavline; Featured photographer: Yu Tsai; Special guests: Nina Franoszek & Philipp Plein
178	15	"Das Halbfinale"	18 May 2017
This week's photoshoot was the Cosmopolitian shoot. At elimination, Thomas and Michael had to decide who would not be in the final. Michael chose Romina and Thomas choose Lynn. After that was the final runway. Leticia was the first to reach the final and then Romina. After that Heidi decided that Lynn is not in the final, because she had not booked a job. After Lynn's elimination, Heidi announced that Céline is the third finalist. Then, Maja was the second eliminated, because she neither had received a job. After that Serlina became the fourth finalist.: Eliminated: Lynn Petertonkoker & Maja Manczak; Featured photographer: Special guests: Anja Delastik & Susanne Bohl
179	16	"Das spektakuläre Finale"	25 May 2017
The final started with a fashion show. Then followed the first decision. Leticia and Romina landed in the Walk-off and Leticia was the first eliminated. Then they had to prove again on the runway. After that, Romina was the second eliminated. The last task was a beauty shot in front of a black wall in pairs. After the final runway, Céline was declared the winner of Germany's Next Topmodel.: Final four: Céline Bethmann, Leticia Wala-Ntuba, Romina Brennecke & Serlina Hohmann; Walk-off: Leticia Wala-Ntuba & Romina Brennecke; Eliminated: Leticia Wala-Ntuba; Final three: Céline Bethmann, Romina Brennecke & Serlina Hohmann; Eliminated: Romina Brennecke; All-Stars walk opener & Personality award: Julia Fux; Final two: Céline Bethmann & Serlina Hohmann; Germany's Next Topmodel: Céline Bethmann; Featured photographer: Markus Schäfer; Special guests: Barbara Meier, Beth Ditto, Helene Fischer, James Blunt, Kim Hnizdo, Naomi Campbell, Rebecca Mir, Robin Schulz, Stefanie Giesinger, & Wolfgang Joop

== Summaries ==
=== Results table ===
Team Thomas	Team Michael

Place	Model	Episodes																	
Place	Model	1 (Note: In Episode 1, Celine, Deborah, Greta and Leticia were granted immunity from elimination. Brenda and Maja were saved by their respective mentors.)	2 (Note: In Episode 2, Christina and Saskia were eliminated outside of panel for their poor performance during the photoshoot.)	3 (Note: In Episode 3, Claudia was eliminated outside of panel after losing the shoot-out.)	4 (Note: In Episode 4, Helena refused her makeover and decided to quit the competition. Aissatou was eliminated outside of panel after losing the shoot-out.)	5	6	7	8 (Note: In Episode 8, Greta decided to quit the competition. Giuliana was voted by the girls to be granted immunity from elimination.)	9	10	11 (Note: In Episode 11, Leticia and Lynn were granted immunity from elimination.)	12 (Note: Episode 12 was a non-elimination.)	13	14 (Note: In Episode 14, Anh was eliminated outside of panel after losing the shoot out.)	15	16		
1	Celine	IMM	SAFE	SAFE	SAFE	SAFE	SAFE	SAFE	SAFE	SAFE	SAFE	SAFE	SAFE	SAFE	SAFE	SAFE	SAFE	SAFE	WIN
2	Serlina	SAFE	SAFE	SAFE	SAFE	SAFE	SAFE	SAFE	SAFE	LOW	SAFE	HIGH	LOW	HIGH	LOW	LOW	SAFE	LOW	OUT
3	Romina	SAFE	SAFE	SAFE	SAFE	SAFE	SAFE	SAFE	SAFE	SAFE	SAFE	SAFE	SAFE	LOW	SAFE	SAFE	LOW	OUT	
4	Leticia	IMM	SAFE	SAFE	SAFE	SAFE	SAFE	SAFE	LOW	HIGH	SAFE	IMM	LOW	SAFE	HIGH	SAFE	OUT		
5–6	Maja	SAVE	SAFE	SAFE	SAFE	SAFE	SAFE	SAFE	LOW	SAFE	SAFE	SAFE	SAFE	SAFE	SAFE	OUT			
5–6	Lynn	SAFE	SAFE	SAFE	LOW	SAFE	SAFE	SAFE	LOW	SAFE	SAFE	IMM	HIGH	SAFE	SAFE	OUT			
7	Carina	SAFE	SAFE	HIGH	SAFE	SAFE	SAFE	SAFE	SAFE	SAFE	HIGH	SAFE	SAFE	SAFE	OUT				
8	Anh	SAFE	SAFE	SAFE	SAFE	SAFE	SAFE	SAFE	SAFE	SAFE	SAFE	LOW	LOW	LOW	OUT				
9	Sabine	SAFE	SAFE	SAFE	LOW	LOW	SAFE	SAFE	SAFE	SAFE	LOW	LOW	LOW	OUT					
10	Brenda	SAVE	SAFE	LOW	SAFE	SAFE	HIGH	SAFE	SAFE	LOW	LOW	OUT							
11	Giuliana	SAFE	HIGH	SAFE	SAFE	SAFE	LOW	LOW	IMM	SAFE	OUT								
12	Soraya	SAFE	SAFE	SAFE	SAFE	SAFE	SAFE	SAFE	LOW	OUT									
13	Julia S.	SAFE	SAFE	SAFE	SAFE	SAFE	SAFE	SAFE	OUT										
14	Greta	IMM	SAFE	SAFE	SAFE	SAFE	SAFE	SAFE	QUIT										
15	Julia F.	SAFE	HIGH	SAFE	LOW	SAFE	SAFE	OUT											
16	Neele	SAFE	LOW	SAFE	LOW	LOW	OUT												
17	Melina	SAFE	SAFE	SAFE	LOW	OUT													
18	Deborah	IMM	SAFE	SAFE	OUT														
19	Aissatou	SAFE	SAFE	LOW	OUT														
20	Helena	SAFE	SAFE	SAFE	QUIT														
21–23	Kimberly	SAFE	SAFE	OUT															
21–23	Chaline	SAFE	SAFE	OUT															
21–23	Milena	SAFE	SAFE	OUT															
24	Claudia	SAFE	LOW	OUT															
25–26	Victoria	SAFE	OUT																
25–26	Elisa	SAFE	OUT																
27–28	Saskia	SAFE	OUT																
27–28	Christina	SAFE	OUT																

The contestant was eliminated outside of judging panel
The contestant withdrew from the competition
The contestant was immune from elimination
The contestant won best photo
The contestant was in danger of elimination
The contestant was eliminated
The contestant won the competition

=== Photo shoot guide ===
- Episode 2 photo shoot: Paddleboarding in bikinis
- Episode 3 photo shoot: On a box in extreme heights
- Episode 4 photo shoot: Sedcard
- Episode 5 photo shoot: Dirty in the desert
- Episode 6 photo shoot: Burlesque Girls in Las Vegas
- Episode 7 photo shoot: Graffiti bodypainting
- Episode 8 photo shoot: Posing with their mentors and dogs in elegant dresses
- Episode 9 photo shoot: On a bed with male models wearing lingerie
- Episode 10 video shoot: Action fashion film with Shaun Ross
- Episode 11 photo shoot: Posing in a plastic ball
- Episode 12 photo shoot: Portraying 'Alice in Wonderland' in a little doll house
- Episode 13 photo shoot: Underwater Goddesses
- Episode 14 photo shoot: Portraying emotions in B&W
- Episode 15 photo shoot: Cosmopolitan cover
- Episode 16 photo shoot: Beauty shot in pairs
