= Wunderkind (fashion) =

German fashion brand

- Company type: GmbH & Co. KG
- Industry: Fashion
- Founded: 2003
- Headquarters: Potsdam, Germany
- Key people: Wolfgang Joop, founder and designer Edwin Lemberg, CEO
- Products: Clothing, accessories
- Number of employees: 15
- Website: www.wunderkind.com

Wunderkind (German pronunciation: [ˈvʊndɐkɪnt]) is a German fashion brand. It was established by Wolfgang Joop and his partner Edwin Lemberg in Potsdam in 2003.

The company headquarters is the Villa Rumpf in Potsdam.

== History ==
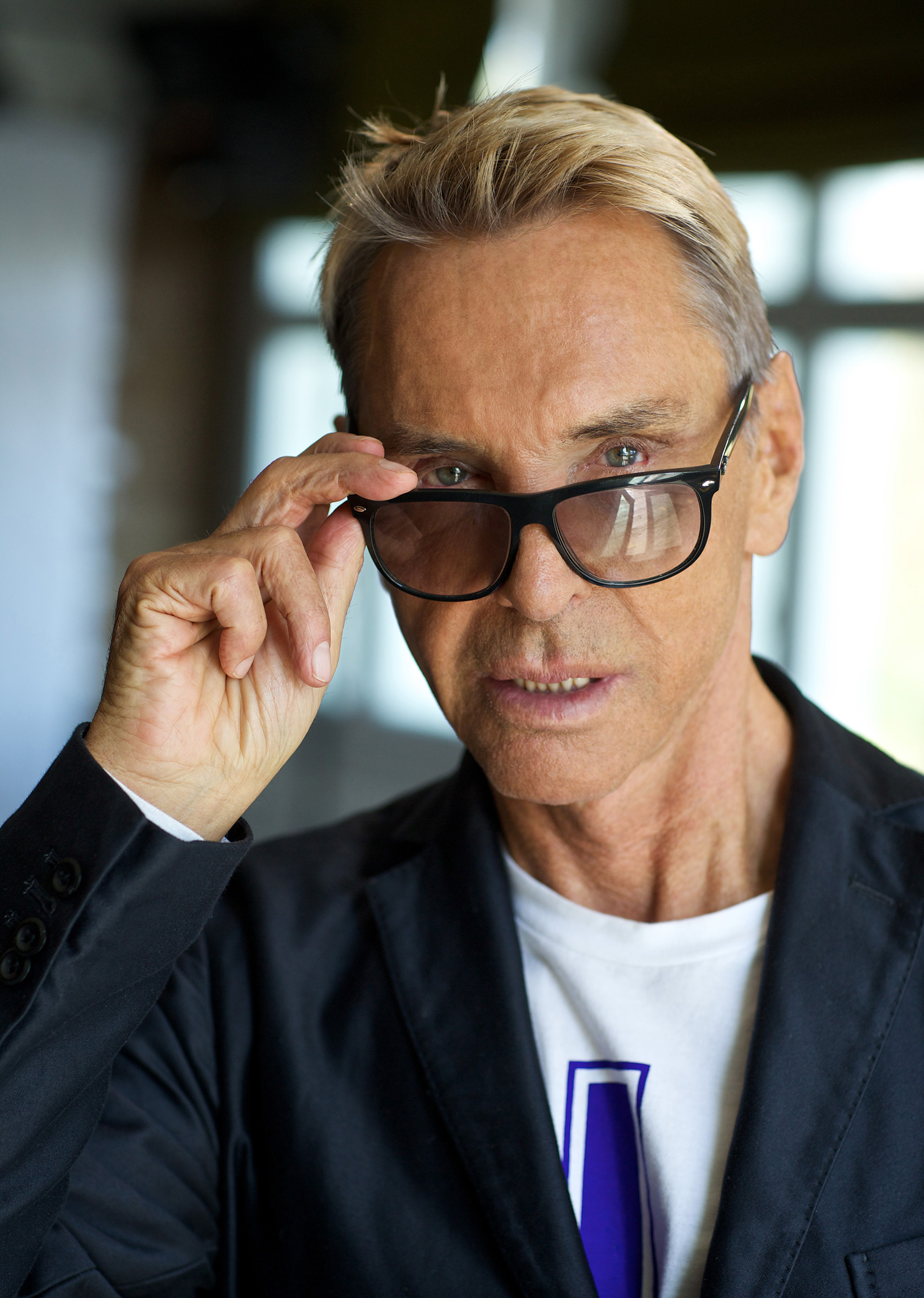
Wunderkind designer Wolfgang Joop (2015)

The label was started in Potsdam by Wolfgang Joop and Edwin Lemberg in 2003. Joop's first international Wunderkind show was at the New York Fashion Week in September 2004. The show was presented in New York City for three consecutive seasons before it switched location to Paris in 2006. A collection was presented during Paris Fashion Week each season until the spring 2011 season before a dispute with investors forced the brand to take a hiatus. Joop came back with a collection in the spring of 2012 which he presented in his hometown of Potsdam and received positive reception. The show celebrated a comeback during Paris Fashion Week for the spring 2013 season but on a smaller scale than before. In the fall of 2017, Joop retired from the brand and Hugo Boss alum Peter Kappler was assigned as the new CEO of the brand.

== Stores ==
In 2013 Wunderkind opened a store in Munich and announced that it would open others in Paris, Potsdam, and on the island of Sylt. The brand can also be found online on websites such as Farfetch, Shopstyle, and Avenue 32.
