= Manfred Baumann =

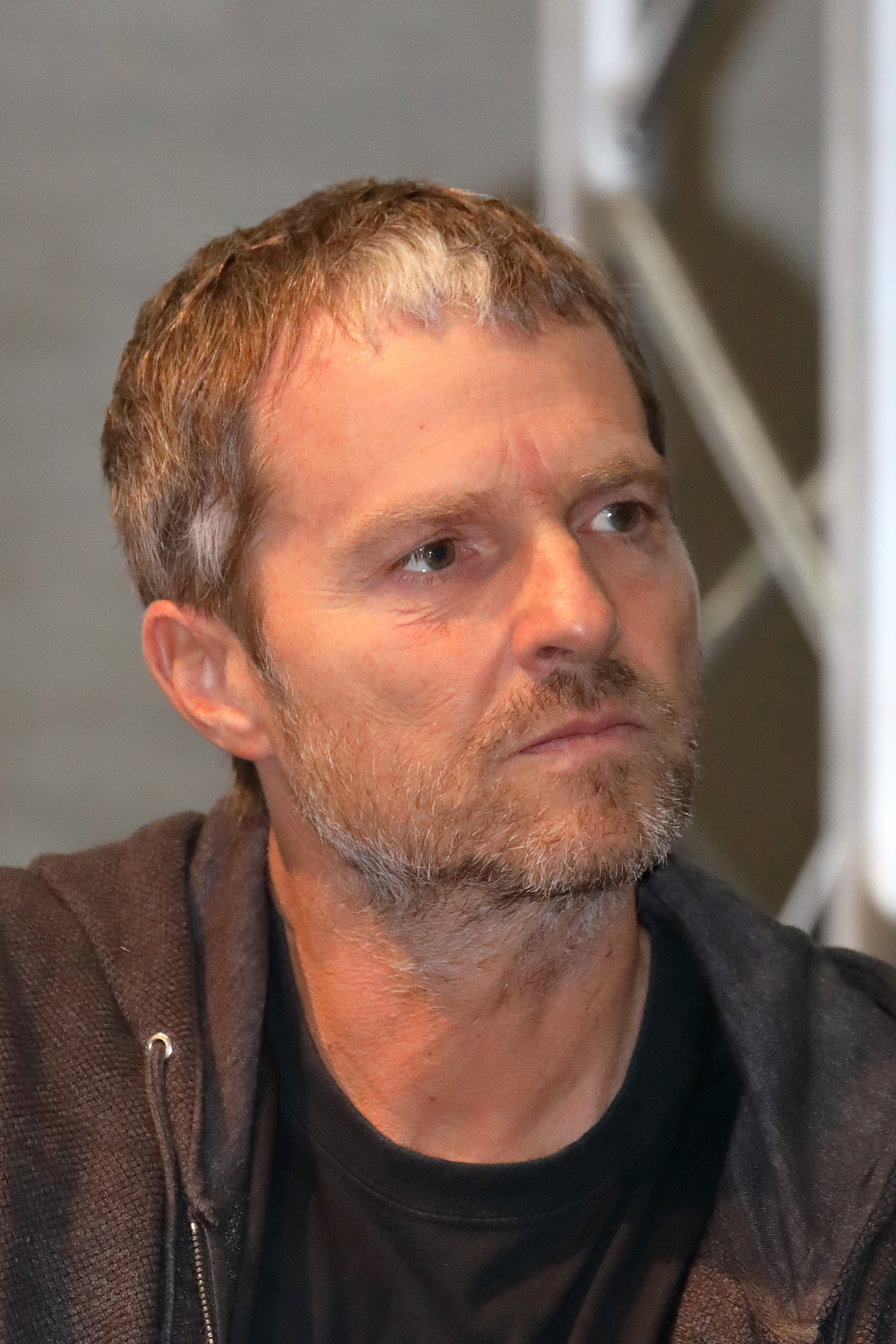
Manfred Baumann (2018)

Manfred Baumann (born March 1, 1968 in Vienna) is an Austrian photographer. He is best known for his work in portrait photography, landscape photography, and nude photography.

== Life ==
Baumann grew up in Hietzing, the 13th district of Vienna, where he also attended school. After finishing secondary school, he began an apprenticeship at the Vienna-based trading company Julius Meinl at age 16 and eventually became a branch manager. In 1995, he moved to Canada to work as a photographer but returned to Vienna two years later to continue working independently. He credits his grandfather, who was also a photographer, as one of his biggest inspirations and the person who gave him his first camera, a Praktica.

In 2002, Baumann began photographing celebrities. In 2005, with the help of a friend, he arranged a shoot with Roger Moore. This led to further sessions with Olivia Newton-John, Toni Garrn, Kirk Douglas, Paul Anka, Tony Curtis, David Hasselhoff, John Malkovich, William Shatner, Don Johnson, Jack Black, and Bruce Willis.

In 2013, he began collaborating with the National Geographic Society and in 2016 with Leica Camera. In 2017, he held his first museum exhibition on Mustangs at the Natural History Museum, Vienna.

In 2014, he supported the animal welfare organization Four Paws by photographing German-speaking celebrities like Michael Mittermeier, Jeanette Biedermann, and Roberto Blanco for the campaign “More Humanity for Animals.” Since 2016, he has been teaching globally for the Leica Akademie.

In 2017/2018, Baumann appeared alongside Robert Lewandowski in an international campaign for a smartphone company. His exhibition “Vienna” was shown in 2018/2019 at the Grand Hotel Wien, followed by his first Australian exhibition in February 2019.

Since 2020, Baumann’s work on the Lipizzaner horses has been on permanent display at the Spanish Riding School in Vienna.

In 2022, he was a guest speaker at the Adobe MAX Conference in Los Angeles.

In 2023, Baumann was a speaker at the LSI/Leica conference in New York. That same year, he curated an exhibition titled “REBIRTH” in Vienna focusing on breast cancer patients.

In summer 2024, his exhibition “Reflections of Life” premiered at the Leica Gallery in Boston. It is set to continue at Leica Gallery Washington, D.C. in 2025.

Also in 2025, he will open the exhibition JANE at the Grand Hotel Wien, dedicated to Jane Goodall and her life’s work.

To mark Leica’s 100-year anniversary in spring 2025, one of Baumann’s portraits of Jane Goodall was featured on the “Wall of Leica” in New York.

Manfred Baumann is married and has a son from a previous relationship. He lives and works in both Austria and the United States. He supports various animal welfare organizations. Together with his wife, Nelly Baumann, he is an honorary ambassador for the Jane Goodall Institute.

== Exhibitions and work ==
His photographs have been published in various photography magazines such as Fotomagazin, Photographie, Chip Magazin, and Digital Photographer Magazine.

His work also appears regularly in lifestyle and general interest magazines such as: *Forbes*, People Magazine, Vogue (French, US, German), GQ, Vanity Fair, InStyle, Maxim, National Geographic, Malibu Magazine, Esquire, Playboy (US, German, French), Penthouse, Stern, Spiegel, Paris Photo, Maxima, Leica Fotomagazin, and others.

== Exhibitions ==
- 2012: Photokina – Cologne (guest appearance with live shoots and 130-meter-long exhibition)
- 2017: The Collection – Leica Gallery Vienna
- 2017: Mustang – Natural History Museum Vienna
- 2020: Lipizzaner – Spanish Riding School, Vienna
- 2024: Reflections of Life – Leica Gallery Boston

== Books and calendars ==
- Just Naked!, Heel Verlag, Frankfurt am Main 2002, ISBN 3-89365-970-6
- Fine Nude Art, Media Service Stuttgart, Amstetten 2005, ISBN 3-902211-30-X
- Celebrities, Novum Verlag, Neckenmarkt 2008, ISBN 3-85022-580-1
- Top 20 Girls 2008, Mohn Kalender, ISBN 3-8318-1288-8
- Erotic Vision, Edition Skylight, Oetwil am See 2009, ISBN 3-03766-596-3
- Manfred Baumann – PHOTOGRAPHIE, Self-published, Vienna 2010, ISBN 978-3-200-01840-2
- Manfred Baumann Calendar 2011, ISBN 978-3-200-01958-4
- Sexy Camera Work, Edition Skylight, Oetwil am See 2012, ISBN 978-3-03766-633-3
- Manfred Baumann Calendar 2012, ISBN 978-3-200-02329-1
- Manfred Baumann Calendar 2013, ISBN 978-3-99018-140-9
- LIVE, Bucher Verlag, Hohenems 2013, ISBN 978-3-99018-186-7
- Old World, New World, National Geographic, Hamburg 2013, ISBN 978-3-86690-365-4
- L.A.Stories, echomedia, Vienna 2014, ISBN 978-3-902900-65-4
- End of Line: The Last Journey of Death Row Inmates to Execution, Novum Verlag, Neckenmarkt 2015, ISBN 3-99048-508-3
- My World of Photography 1991–2016, Novum Verlag, Neckenmarkt 2016, ISBN 3-99048-638-1
- Mustangs, Novum Pro Verlag, Neckenmarkt 2017, ISBN 978-3-99064-073-9
- Vienna, Edition Roesner, Krems an der Donau 2018, ISBN 978-3-903059-75-7
- Face to Face, Hatje Cantz Verlag, ISBN 978-3-7757-5085-1
- VENUS – The Art of Beauty, Novum Verlag, ISBN 978-3-99146-407-5
