= Giuliana Farfalla =

German model

- Born: Pascal Radermacher; 23 April 1996 (age 29); Herbolzheim, Germany
- Occupation(s): Model and television host
- Height: 1.78 m (5 ft 10 in)

Giuliana Radermacher (born 23 April 1996), known by her stage name Giuliana Farfalla, is a German model.

== Biography ==
Farfalla is from Herbolzheim in Breisgau. She was assigned male at birth, and had sex reassignment surgery at the age of 16.

Farfalla participated on the twelfth season of Germany's Next Topmodel, and finished in eleventh place. In January 2018, she became the first transgender model to appear on the cover of the German Playboy. In the same month, she appeared on the twelfth season of Ich bin ein Star – Holt mich hier raus!.
