= Vanessa Fuchs =

German model (born 1996)

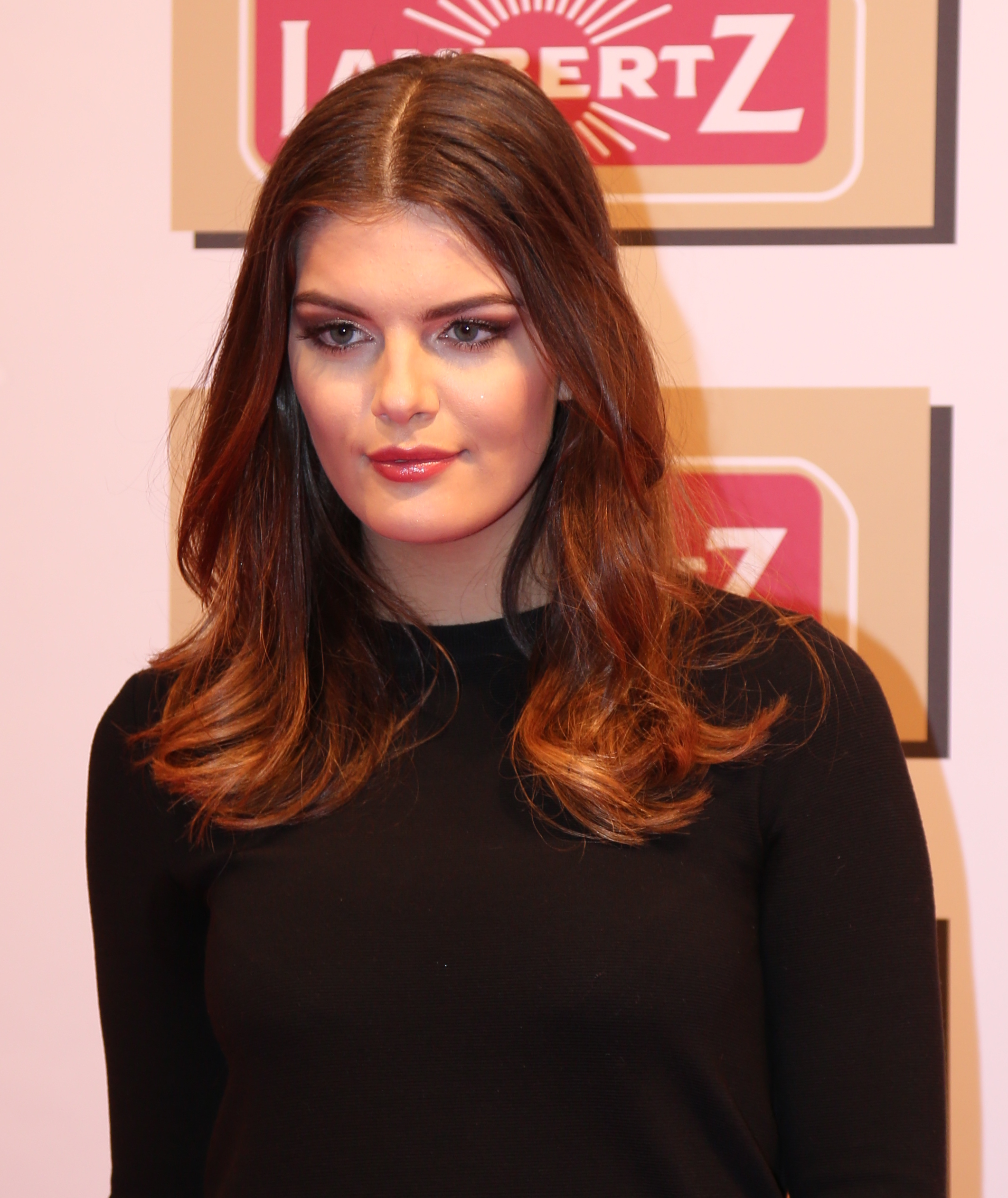
- Fuchs in 2017
- Born: Vanessa Ann Fuchs; 22 March 1996 (age 29); Bergisch Gladbach, Germany
- Occupation: Model
- Height: 1.80 m (5 ft 11 in)

Vanessa Ann Fuchs (born 22 March 1996 in Bergisch Gladbach) is a German model, currently based in New York City.

At the age of 19, the 1.80-metre-tall (5 ft 11 in) Vanessa Fuchs became the winner of the tenth cycle of Germany's Next Topmodel. The final of the event with Heidi Klum was broadcast on ProSieben on 28 May 2015. As the winner, Fuchs received a model contract with Günther Klum's model agency ONEeins, an Opel Adam Rocks and prize money of 100,000 euros.

As of July 2020, she has over 300,000 followers on Instagram.
