= Toni Garrn =

German fashion model (born 1992)

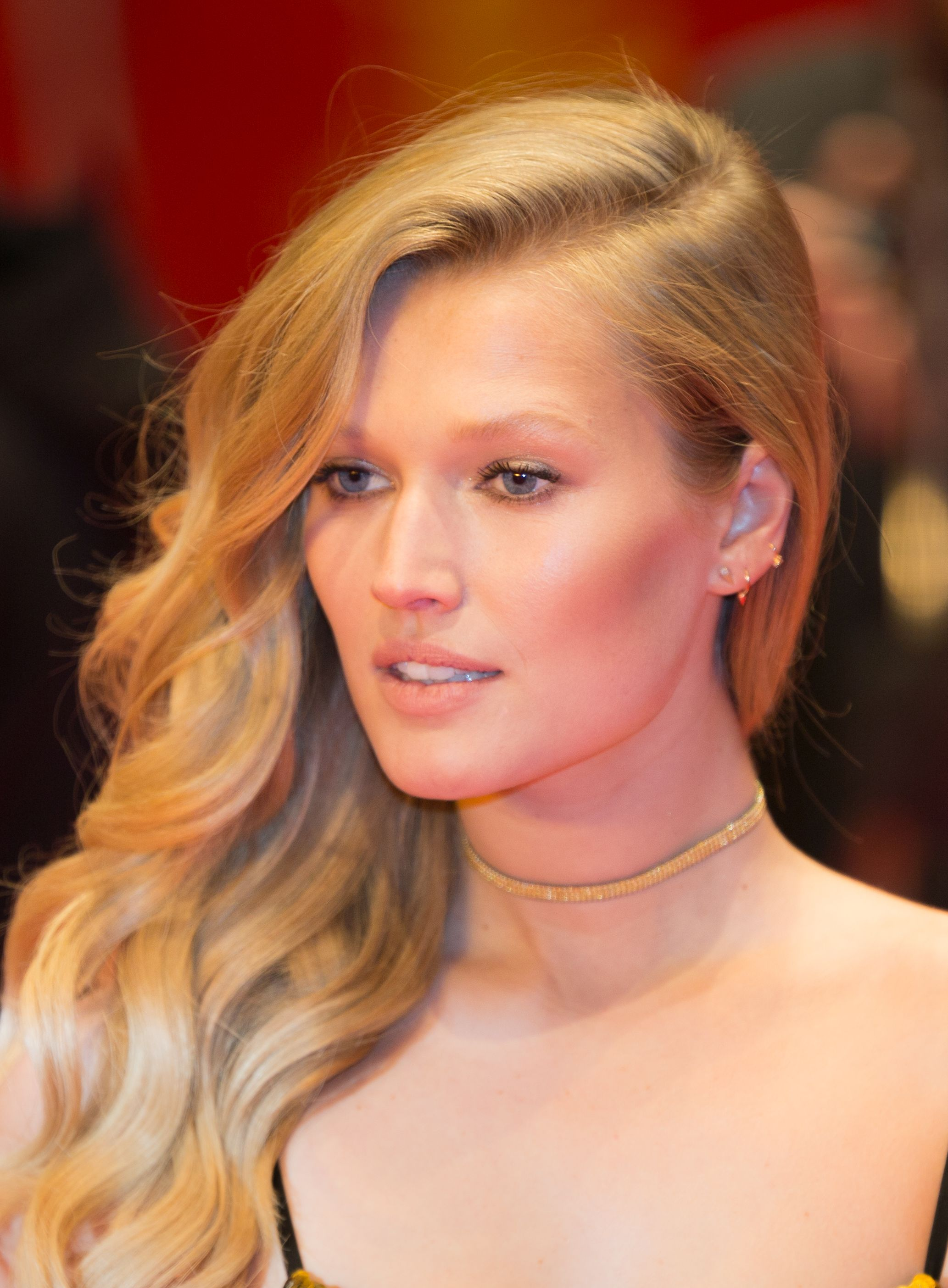
- Garrn in 2017
- Born: Antonia Garrn; 7 July 1992 (age 33); Hamburg, Germany
- Spouse: Alex Pettyfer (m. 2020; sep. 2023)
- Children: 1
- Modeling information
- Hair color: Blonde
- Eye color: Blue
- Agency: The Lions (New York, Los Angeles); Women Management (Paris, Milan); Storm Management (London); View Management (Barcelona)

Antonia Garrn (German pronunciation: [ˈtoːni ˈɡaʁn]; born 7 July 1992) is a German model. She rose to prominence in the fashion industry after signing an exclusive contract with Calvin Klein in 2008. She was married to British actor Alex Pettyfer, with whom she has a daughter.

== Early life ==
Garrn was born in Hamburg. Her father works for an oil company and her mother is a businesswoman. She has an older brother, Niklas (born 1990), who is also a model. When Garrn was two years old, she moved to London with her family, and later to Athens when she was six, where she studied at Campion School (Athens). By the age of 10, she moved back to Hamburg with her family. Garrn can play classical piano, having taken lessons since age 6.

When Garrn was 13, she was discovered during the 2006 FIFA World Cup in her hometown Hamburg, and then signed with New York agency Women Management.

Garrn's native languages are English (from having lived in England as a child) and German; she can also speak French.

== Career ==
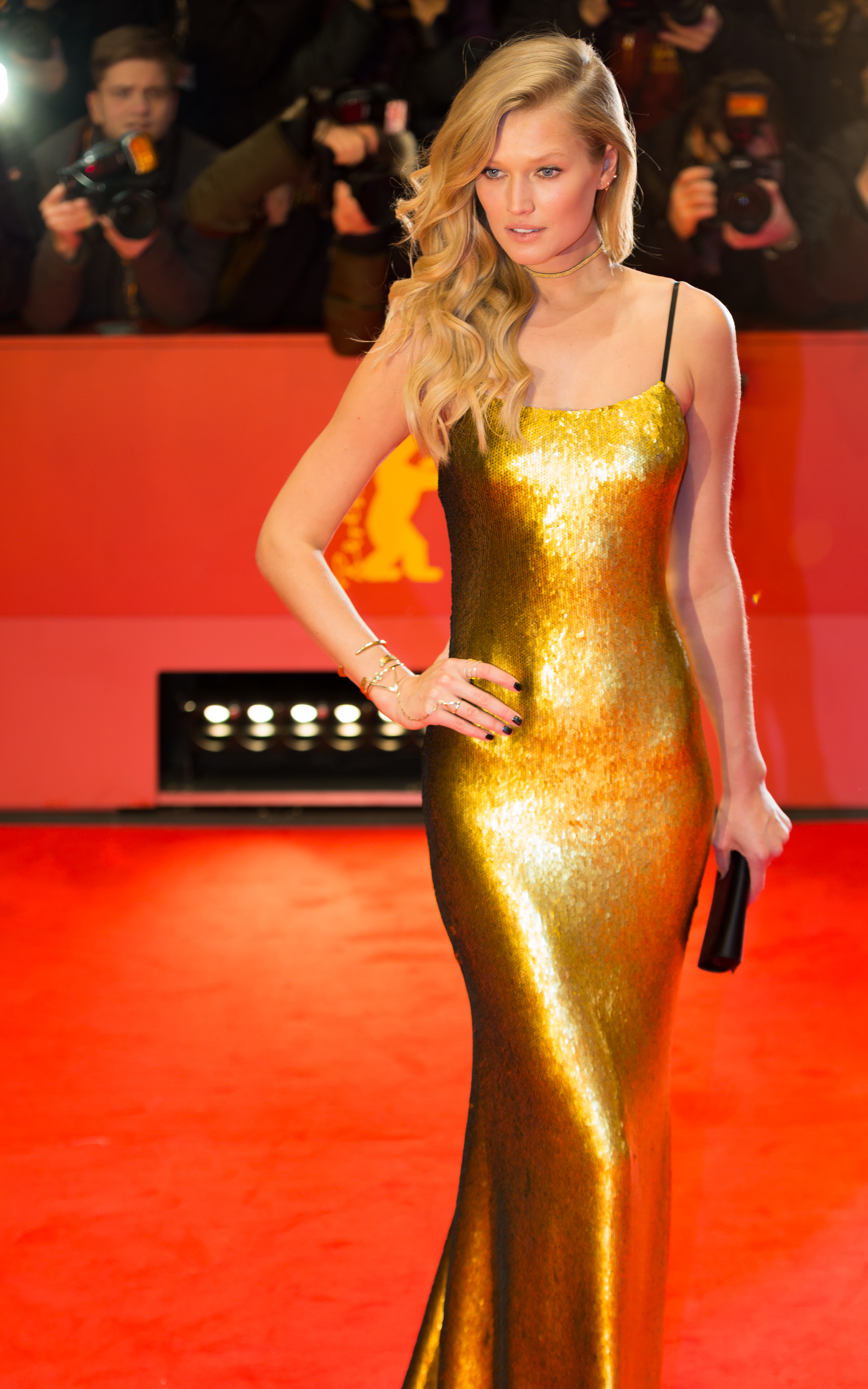
Garrn at the Berlinale 2017

Garrn debuted on the runway at age 15 as an exclusive for the Calvin Klein Spring/Summer 2008 runway show in New York. She then went on to be featured in the designer's ad campaign. The following season, she again walked exclusively for Calvin Klein. In the 2009-seasons, she walked over 60 shows for prestigious designers such as Stella McCartney, Dior, Louis Vuitton, Chanel, Hermès, Dolce & Gabbana, Michael Kors and others during fashion week.

She has appeared in Vogue (Paris, Italy, Germany, Russia, China, Spain, Mexico, Japan, Korea, US), Muse, Elle (US, Italy, France), Numéro (France, Tokyo), Glamour (US), Marie-Claire (Italy), Another Magazine, Harper's Bazaar (US), i-D, and on the covers of Tush magazine and V magazine as the eighth ranked model of spring 2008. She also covered the February 2009 edition of Numéro for their #100 issue.

In early 2012, she re-entered the Top 50 Models Women-list of the international modelling site models.com, ranking in 20th place. She was first featured on the list in 2009, eventually peaking in 11th place.

In 2014, she collaborated with German denim label Closed and designs her own line of jeans. Proceeds from the sales of her Closed T-shirt, her "Toni" jeans for women are donated to a charity that focuses on the education of young girls in Africa.

Garrn's résumé includes covers for French, Japanese, Chinese, German and Russian Numéro, German, Italian, Mexican, Spanish, Turkish, Ukrainian, Korean, Russian, Portuguese, and Thai Vogue, German and South African GQ, W, French, German and Italian Elle, Madame Figaro, Muse, Harper's Bazaar, Allure, Glamour, The Edit and Grazia.

She appeared in advertisements for Calvin Klein, Prada, Versace, Cartier (fragrance), Jill Stuart, Fendi, Chloé, Emporio Armani, Hugo Boss, Zara, H&M, Dior, Donna Karan, JOOP!, Shiseido, Filippa K, J.Crew, Neiman Marcus, Givenchy (makeup), Tommy Hilfiger, Juicy Couture, Massimo Dutti, Max Mara, Peek & Cloppenburg, Express, Ralph Lauren, Burberry, L'Oréal, Biotherm, NARS Cosmetics, Mango, Ann Taylor, Blumarine, Aigner, Lancel, Alexandre Vauthier, Elie Saab, Calzedonia, Seafolly and Schwarzkopf.

Garrn has worked with photographers like Steven Meisel, Peter Lindbergh, Karl Lagerfeld, Manfred Baumann, Paolo Roversi, Mariano Vivanco, Miles Aldridge, Craig McDean, Corinne Day, Camilla Åkrans, Ellen von Unwerth, Mert and Marcus, Victor Demarchelier, David Bellemere, Greg Kadel and Mario Testino.

=== Victoria's Secret ===
In 2011, Garrn started modeling for Victoria's Secret, firstly appearing in their catalogs doing the clothing line. Soon after she walked in the 2011 Victoria's Secret Fashion Show, and did a photo-shoot for the PINK-line with fellow model Shanina Shaik. Her first Victoria's Secret fashion show casting was actually in 2010, but she was ultimately not cast for that year's show.

In April 2012, Garrn was reported incorrectly by the media to have been chosen to become an official Victoria's Secret Angel. Soon after it was revealed that Garrn was merely chosen to star in a Victoria's Secret campaign for the "Dream Angel" line alongside Erin Heatherton and Lindsay Ellingson as well as the "Angels in Love" commercial starring Elyse Taylor.

On 17 April 2012, Garrn and the Victoria's Secret Angels, Erin Heatherton and Lindsay Ellingson, launched the Victoria's Secret "Love Is Heavenly" fragrance in a Victoria's Secret store in SoHo. In November 2012, she returned to the catwalk of the Victoria's Secret Fashion Show for the second time, closing the show. She also walked the show in 2013 and again in the 2018 show after a hiatus.

=== Acting ===
Garrn was cast to play the role of Reeva Steenkamp in the 2017 Lifetime movie Oscar Pistorius: Blade Runner Killer. The film chronicles Oscar Pistorius' conviction of culpable homicide after fatally shooting Steenkamp on 14 February 2013 in his Pretoria home. In the same year Garrn appeared in the first two episodes of the German drama series You Are Wanted. In 2018, she appeared in Head Full of Honey by Til Schweiger and in Álvaro Soler's music video "La Cintura". In 2019, she appeared in a minor role in the superhero film Spider-Man: Far from Home.

== Philanthropy ==
In 2014, Garrn became an ambassador for Plan International's global Because I Am a Girl campaign and has hosted and co-hosted several fundraising events in support of Plan.

In February 2016, Garrn established the Toni Garrn Foundation, which raises money for projects advocating for and advancing girls' access to education in Burundi, Ghana, Rwanda and Uganda. She has hosted an annual fundraiser for her charity aptly titled "Supermodel Flea Market" in which donated clothes from celebrities and models are sold.

In 2025, Garrn was recognized by the Gates Foundation for her philanthropic work and named one of several Goalkeepers.

== Personal life ==
Garrn lived in an apartment in Financial District, Manhattan in New York City with her best friend Ali Stephens.

She did not appear at fashion week in February 2010 in order to focus on the final exams of the Abitur.

Garrn was in a relationship with actor Leonardo DiCaprio from 2013 to 2014.

Garrn was engaged to English actor Alex Pettyfer on 24 December 2019. They married in Hamburg, Germany on 2 October 2020. The couple has a daughter who was born in July 2021. On 22 April 2023, on her Instagram account, Garrn announced that she and Pettyfer were divorcing.

== Filmography ==
Year	Title	Roles	Note
2011	Life + Times: Empire State of Mind	Herself	Short film
2016	The Shift		Short film
2017	Under the Bed	Lisa	TV movie
2017	You Are Wanted	Katja	2 episodes
2017	Oscar Pistorius: Blade Runner Killer	Reeva Steenkamp	
2018	Head Full of Honey	Nora	
2019	Berlin, I Love You	Heather	
2019	Spider-Man: Far From Home	The Seamstress	
2021	Crisis	Sarah	
2021	Warning	Olivia	
