= Lovelyn Enebechi =

German-Nigerian fashion model

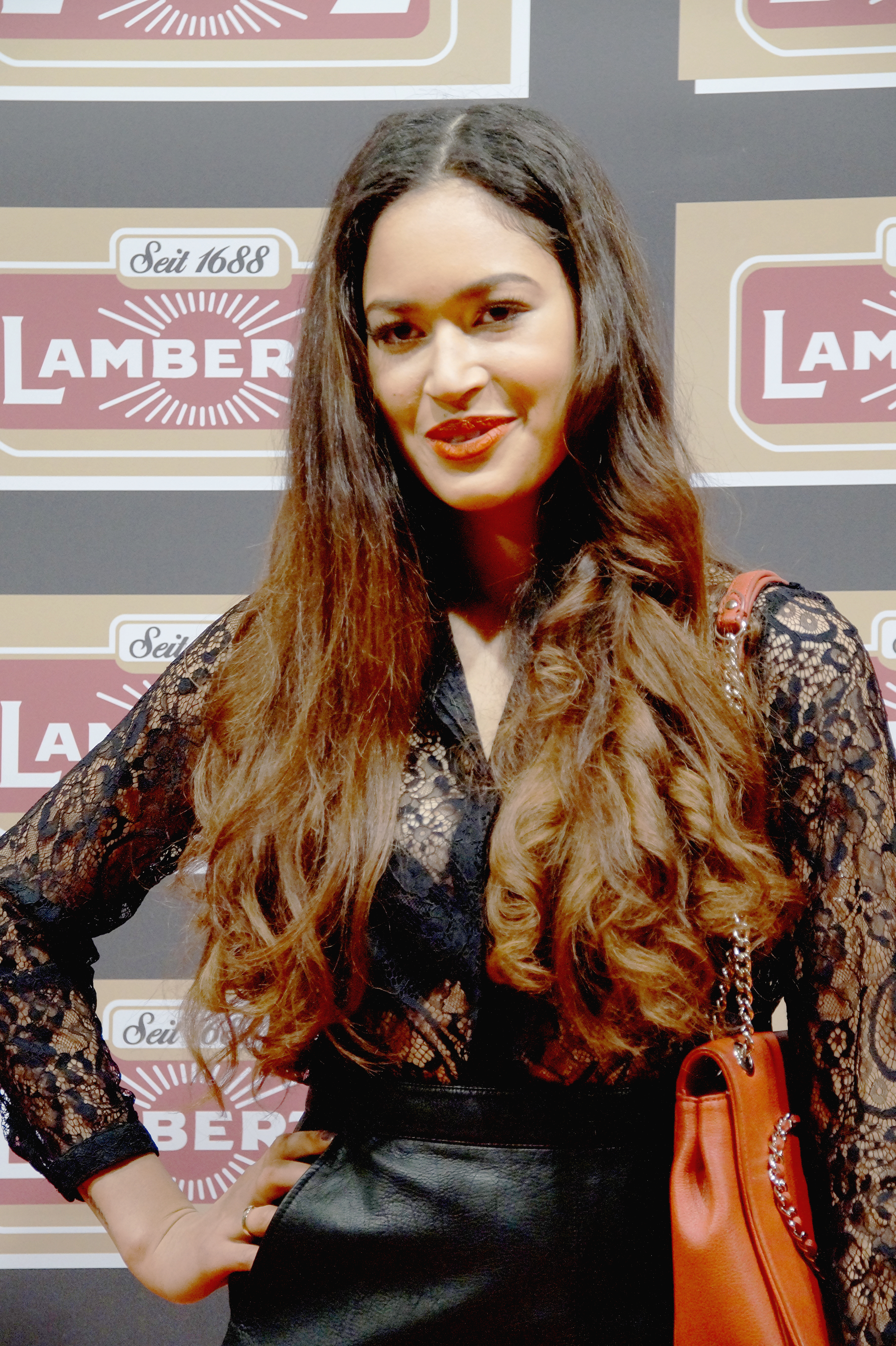
- Born: Lovelyn Chinwe Enebechi; 21 October 1996 (age 29); Hamburg, Germany
- Occupation: Model
- Modeling information
- Height: 1.77 m (5 ft 10 in)
- Hair color: Brown
- Eye color: Brown
- Agency: ONEeins fab Management

Lovelyn Chinwe Enebechi (born 21 October 1996) is a German-Nigerian fashion model, best known for winning the eighth cycle of Germany's Next Topmodel.

== Germany's Next Topmodel ==
Enebechi was chosen from 15,500 applicants to be one of the final 25 finalists of cycle 8 of Germany's Next Topmodel. Ultimately, she was crowned the winner of the competition during the cycle's live finale on 30 May 2013, beating Maike van Grieken. As her prizes, she received a spread in and cover of German Cosmopolitan, an Opel Adam, a modeling contract with ONEeins Management, a €250,000 cash prize and an apartment in a fashion capital of her choice.
