= JOOP! =

German luxury fashion house

- Type: Private company
- Industry: Fashion, cosmetics
- Founded: 1986
- Headquarters: Hamburg, Germany
- Key people: Wolfgang Joop
- Products: Clothes
- Website: www.joop.com

Joop GmbH, branded JOOP! (pronounced [joːp] in German, roughly: yope; known in English as /dʒuːp/), is a German luxury fashion house specializing in contemporary clothing and cosmetics.

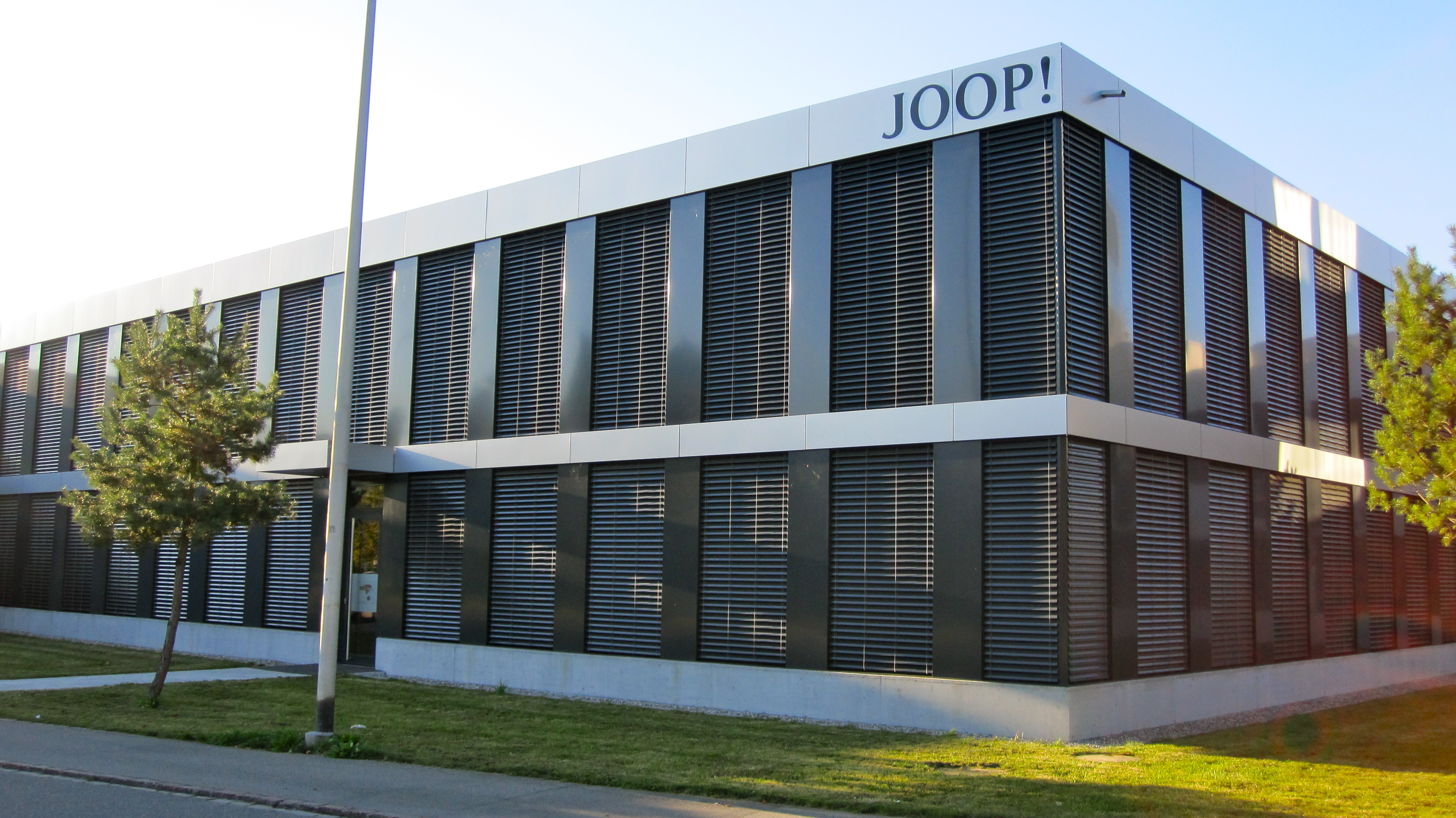
Building of JOOP! in Kreuzlingen

== History ==
The company was founded as a designer label by German fashion designer Wolfgang Joop in Hamburg, Germany, in 1986. Joop, who had been selling designer clothing under his last name since 1981, established a successful license business that eventually offered upscale womenswear, menswear, kid's clothing, accessories, and home articles. To distinguish the brand from himself as an artist he added an exclamation mark to the name. A secondary denim and sportswear collection, Joop! Jeans was created in 1988. The company is most notable for its vast fragrance range originally launched in 1987. In the mid-1990s, Joop! fragrances were introduced to the American market while its fashions were presented at New York Fashion Week and sold by American retailers such as Saks Fifth Avenue.

In 1998, Wolfgang Joop and his estranged business partner sold 95% of their Joop shares to an investor while Joop remained the brand's creative director. In 2001, Joop sold the remaining 5% and left the company. The conglomerate company, Wünsche AG of Hamburg, itself heavily in debt and unable to turn the Joop! brand into a global player as it had planned, declared bankruptcy at the end of 2001. In 2003, Joop was sold by Wünsche AG's liquidator to three of Joop's former licensees in equal shares and business units (fashion, accessories/leather, and fragrance/cosmetics). In 2006, the fashion licensee, Swiss-based Holy Fashion Group, paid off the accessories/leather licensee, Egana Goldpfeil, and now owns Joop's clothing and accessories business. The fragrance and cosmetics business remains with Coty, Inc. of New York. The Joop! Jeans and kidswear lines were discontinued in the late 2000s. Holy Fashion Group, whose owners are descendants and former owners of Hugo Boss, is based in Kreuzlingen, Switzerland.

Joop offers contemporary womenswear and menswear under the Joop! Collection and Joop! Casual labels as well as shoes and accessories, underwear (Joop! Bodywear), jewellery, watches (Joop! Time), fragrances, and a home collection (Joop! Living) at a mid-range price level primarily in German, Austrian, and Swiss markets. The company maintains retail stores in Hamburg and Düsseldorf, an online store as well as several outlet stores. In Germany, Joop! is a well-known brand; its brand awareness among the population reaches 82%.

In 2020, Joop! announced it would be expanding its men's collection to the UK, aiming to double its revenues. Via fashion distribution agency, Love Brands, the brand has a showroom based in Wapping, London.
