= Céline Bethmann =

German model (born 1998)

- Born: 4 July 1998 (age 26); Koblenz, Germany
- Occupation: Model
- Years active: 2017–present
- Modeling information
- Height: 1.81 m (5 ft 11 1/2 in)
- Hair color: Brown
- Eye color: Blue
- Agency: Elite Model Management (London, Barcelona, Milan & Copenhagen)

Céline Bethmann (born 4 July 1998) is a German model and the winner of Germany's Next Topmodel in 2017.

== Early life ==
Bethmann was born in Koblenz and lives with her sister and mother. To participate in Germany's Next Topmodel, she left Koblenz high school at the Carthage before taking her Abitur.

== Career ==
In the final of the twelfth season of the show on 25 May 2017, 18-year-old Bethmann won the competition. She received a contract with model agency ONEeins, an Opel Adam, and prize money of €100,000.

Bethmann signed with Elite Model Management in London, Milan, Paris, Barcelona and Copenhagen. She has had jobs in Paris, Milan, Cuba, Barcelona and London.

In March 2017, Céline made her catwalk debut walking shows in Paris, such as Balmain, Yohji Yamamoto, Tsumori Chisato presentation, and Agnès b.

Bethmann also featured in an editorial for Elle France and Italia. She works for various brands like Sarda World, Bershka and Urban Outfitters.
