= Wolfgang Joop =

German fashion designer (born 1944)

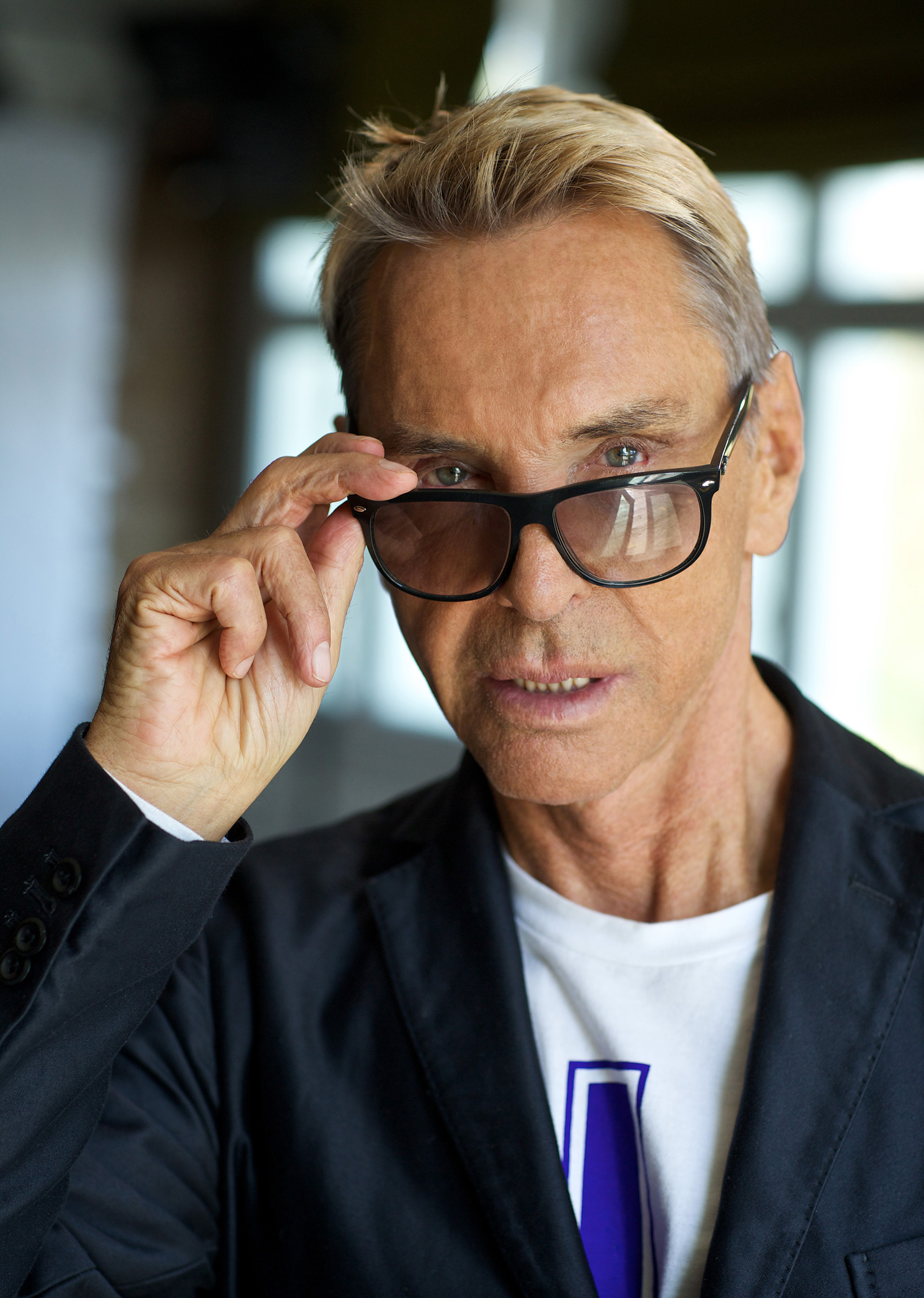
- Wolfgang Joop photographed by Oliver Mark, Berlin 2015
- Born: 18 November 1944 (age 81); Potsdam, Germany
- Labels: JOOP!; Wunderkind
- Spouses: Karin Benatzky (m. 1970; div. 1985) Edwin Lemberg (m. 2013)
- Children: Jette Joop; Florentine Joop
- Parents: Gerhard Joop; Charlotte Joop
- Awards: See corresponding section

Wolfgang Joop (born 18 November 1944) is a German fashion designer. He is the founder of the fashion and cosmetics company JOOP! as well as the fashion brand Wunderkind.

== Early life ==
Joop was born in Potsdam to editor and author Gerhard Joop and his wife Charlotte. He grew up on his grandparents' farm in Bornstedt until 1954, when his family moved to Braunschweig, where his father had been hired as chief-editor of cultural magazine Westermanns Monatshefte. During the GDR period, Ulla Ebert, the sister of Joop's mother, lived in the property and was financially supported for its preservation by the family from the West. After the German reunification, Joop's parents moved back to Bornstedt.

After getting his Abitur in 1964 at the Wilhelm-Gymnasium in Braunschweig, Joop began studies in advertising-psychology in 1966 at the Braunschweig University of Technology, which he did not finish. After dropping out, he worked as a restorer. In 1968, he began studies in art education that he also did not finish.

== Fashion career ==
=== Career beginnings ===
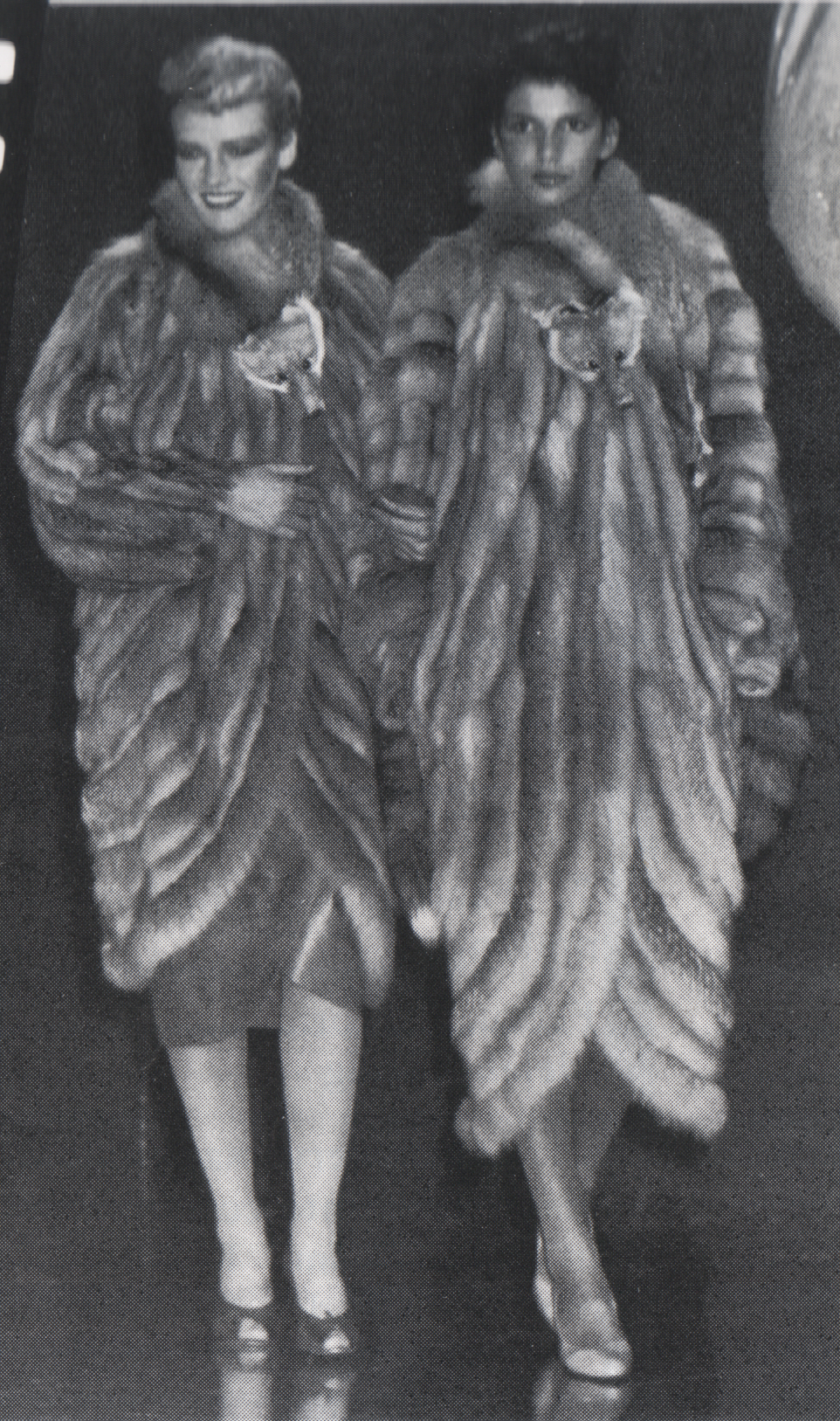
Coats from a fur collection by Wolfgang Joop (1979)

Joop began his career in 1970, when he took part to a competition by German women's magazine Constanze with his then-wife Karin Benatzky and they were awarded all three first prizes. This success landed him a job as fashion editor at the Hamburg-based women's magazine Neue Mode in 1970, from which he resigned in 1971 to continue working independently, including as a freelance journalist and designer.

Joop achieved international success in 1978 with his first fur collection. In 1985, he was invited to become a guest lecturer of fashion design at the University of the Arts in Berlin. He was made honorary professor in 1987.

=== JOOP! ===
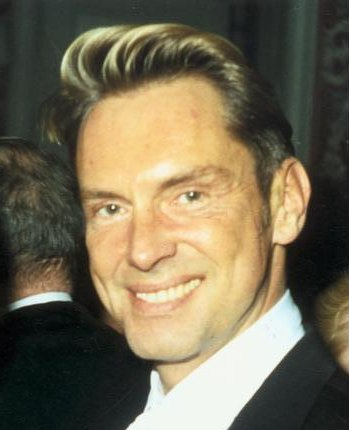
Joop in 1992

In early 1982, Joop presented his first ready-to-wear women's collection, followed by his first men's collection in 1985. Two years later, with the launch of his first perfume collection, he made his name a trademark, with capital letters to symbolise energy along with an exclamation mark. Clothes, shoes, jewelry, eyeglasses, and perfume were immediately available under this brand. The "JOOP!" label became available for licensing, and Joop's company no longer produced any of its own goods for sale. Since 1997, Joop's products have been sold through JOOP! GmbH with the exception of Parfum JOOP!, which was sold to Coty/Lancaster in 1991 followed by licensee contracts. In 1998, Joop sold 95% of his JOOP! shares to Wünsche AG for 150 million Deutsche Mark, but remained the brand's creative director. In 2001, he sold the remaining 5% and left the company.

=== Wunderkind ===
In 2003, Joop and his partner Edwin Lamberg founded the high-end couture fashion label Wunderkind. Joop first presented Wunderkind with the Fall/Winter collection 2003 in Potsdam to an audience of press and retail guests. Wunderkind made its international début in New York City in September 2004, when it was invited by the CFDA to premiere the collection at New York Fashion Week, and moved to Paris in 2006. Boutiques were opened in Berlin, London, and Sylt. In January 2011, it was reported that Wunderkind faced restructuring, with the dismissal of almost all its staff, and its March Paris Fashion Week show was cancelled. That same year, Joop designed the bridal gown worn by Princess Sophie of Isenburg for her marriage to Prince Georg of Prussia in August. After over a year of inactivity, Wunderkind presented a new show in Potsdam on 10 May 2012. A new general manager was put in place and there are plans to open another store in Berlin and for steady but slower growth.

== Other activities ==
Independently from his labels, Joop released two men's perfumes in collaboration with Coty Prestige: Wolfgang Joop (2008) and Wolfgang Joop: Freigeist (2010). In late 2009, he began a collaboration with the Bayreuth-based healthcare company medi, for which he designed a series of high-priced compression stockings that he also presented at the Paris show of his label Wunderkind in late 2009. He worked with medi again in 2012. In October 2010, Joop became a creative consultant for Galeria Kaufhof. In September 2011, the collection "GALERIA 1879 by Wolfgang Joop", named after the founding year of the chain, was made available for sale in all Kaufhof stores.

=== Art ===
Joop has diverse interests and is involved in many activities beyond fashion and design, including illustration. Over 100 of his works are on show at the Museum für Kunst und Gewerbe in Hamburg. Since 2009, he has been selling some of his drawings through the gallery Lumas. He also creates sculptures, one of which can be found in the cemetery of Bornstedt. Joop also collects art, particularly contemporary paintings and sculptures, as well as furniture.

=== Writing ===
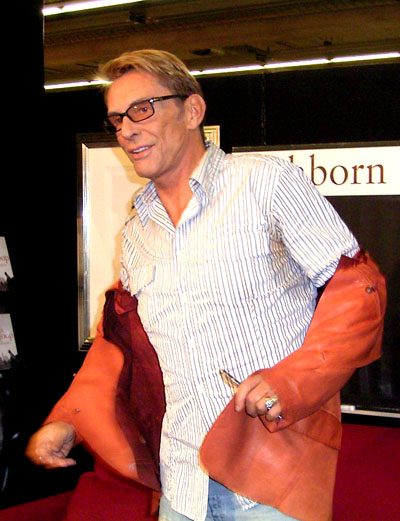
Joop at the Frankfurt Book Fair in 2003

Joop has written several books, including the gift book Das kleine Herz (2001), the cookbook Hectic Cuisine (2002), the autobiography Stillstand des Flüchtigen (2002), the novel Im Wolfspelz (2003), and Wolfgang Joop, Wunderkind: 14467 Potsdam, published by Rolf Heyne Collection (2009). His second autobiography Undressed. Aus einem Leben mit mir (2013) was written in collaboration with journalist and author Rebecca Casati. He also authored numerous articles for publications such as Der Spiegel, Stern, and Welt am Sonntag.

=== Acting and television ===
Joop had a main role in Oskar Roehler's satirical film Suck My Dick (2001). He also had roles in various other films such as Tears in Florence (1984), The Summer of the Samurai (1986), and Beloved Sister (2002). In 2014 and 2015, he was a judge on Germany's Next Topmodel alongside Heidi Klum and Thomas Hayo. He also reappeared on the show as a guest judge in 2017 and 2018.

=== Philanthropy ===
Joop supports the organisation Dunkelziffer e. V. for sexually abused children as well as the Hamburg Leuchtfeuer for people with AIDS. He also has been volunteering for the Deutsche Knochenmarkspenderdatei.

== Awards ==
- 1983: Fil d'or (award by the Confédération Internationale du Lin, Monte Carlo)
- 1984: Das Goldene Spinnrad (fashion prize by the city of Krefeld and of the European Silk Commission)
- 1995: Forum-Preis (award by the magazine Textilwirtschaft)
- 2005: Osgar (media prize by Bild)
- 2009: Bambi in the category "Sonderpreis der Jury"
- 2011: Radio Regenbogen Award in the category "Medienmann"
- 2012: Designpreis der Bundesrepublik Deutschland in the category "Lebenswerk"

== Personal life ==
In 1970, Joop married Karin Benatzky, then an art student. They divorced in 1985. They have two daughters, fashion and jewel designer Henriette, known as Jette (born 1968), and painter and author Florentine (born 1973). Joop came out as bisexual in a January 1996 interview with Der Spiegel. Since separating from Benatzky, he has been in a relationship with Edwin Lemberg. They entered a civil union in 2013 in Potsdam, which only became known in 2017.

In 2001, Joop caused controversy with a statement regarding the September 11 attacks, saying: "I do not regret that the symbol of the Twin Towers is not standing anymore, because they represented capitalist arrogance."
