= Kim Hnizdo =

German model (born 1996)

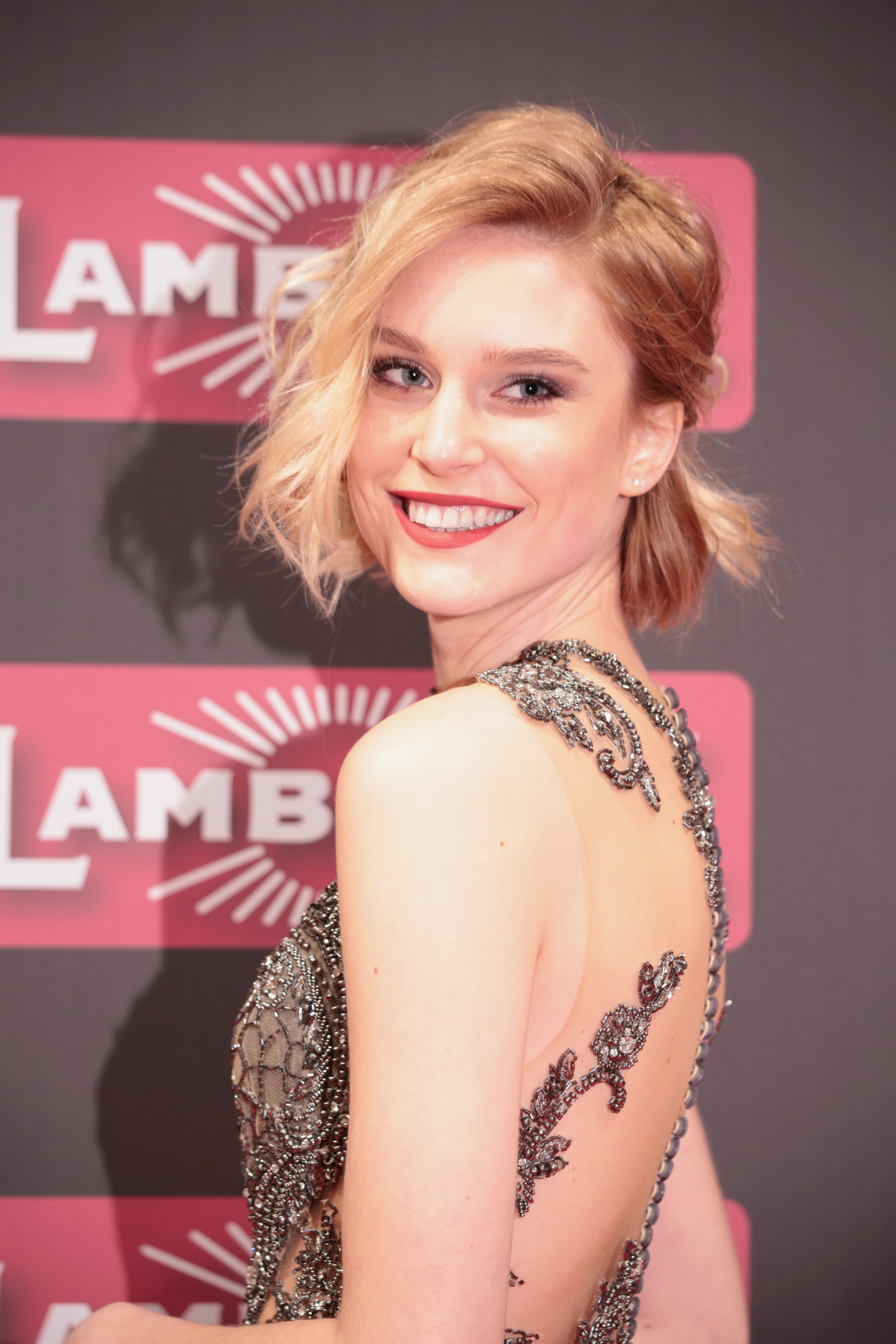
- Hnizdo in 2018
- Born: Kim Laura Hnizdo; 13 April 1996 (age 30); Hessen, Germany
- Occupation: Model
- Years active: 2016–present
- Modeling information
- Height: 5 ft 9 1/2 in (1.77 m)
- Hair color: Blonde
- Eye color: Blue

Kim Laura Hnizdo (born 13 April 1996) is a German model and the winner of Germany's Next Topmodel in 2016.

== Life ==
Hnizdo graduated from the Humboldtschule in Bad Homburg, and began to study law at the Justus Liebig University of Giessen.

She is the winner of the eleventh season of the castingshow Germany's Next Topmodel. As the winner, Hnizdo received a model contract with the Model Agency ONEeins, an Opel Adam and prize money to the amount of €100,000.
