= Sergio Bucher =

Spanish/Swiss businessman (born 1963)

- Born: 7 November 1963 (age 63); La Chaux-de-Fonds, Switzerland
- Education: Engineer in Applied Mathematics, Ecole Polytechnique Fédérale de Lausanne
- Occupation: Businessman

Sergio Bucher Rodriguez (born November 1963) is a dual-nationality Spanish/Swiss businessman. His career took him through companies such as Inditex, Nike, Puma and Amazon, before he became the chief executive of Debenhams in October 2016, succeeding Michael Sharp. He stepped down in 2019. Between 2020 and 2026, he became member of the executive board for the Otto Group. Since 2026, he serves as a non-executive board member in companies such as Otto Group, Bonprix and World Retail Congress.

== Early life ==
He is half Spanish and half-Swiss. He studied Applied Mathematics Engineering at the École Polytechnique Fédérale de Lausanne.

== Career ==
From 1987 to 1997 he worked for DuPont. He worked from 1998 to 2000 at Grupo Cortefiel in Spain, then from 2000 to 2003 at Inditex in Spain where he founded Inditex's lingerie chain Oysho. From 2004 to 2008 he was general manager for Retail at Nike, Inc. for EMEA, and retail director of Spain and Portugal. He worked from 2009 to 2013 for Puma SE as general manager of global retail.

From 2013 to 2016 he headed Amazon's fashion business in Europe where he centralised fashion activities and opened one of the largest digital content factories in Europe in Shoreditch (London)

In May 2016, it was announced that he would become the chief executive of Debenhams in October 2016. Sergio Bucher was at the helm for three years, leading the company’s complex transformation and oversaw the administration process that concluded with the support of its lenders.

From February 2020 till 2026, he served as member of the executive board for Retail and Brands at the Otto Group, where he oversaw a portfolio of multichannel companies such as Crate & Barrel, Freemans & Grattan plc, Manufactum, Frankonia and Otto International, the sourcing operation of the Otto Group, acting as the chairman of the board of those companies.

In 2026, he took positions as non-executive director on the supervisory (or advisory) board of several companies, such as the Otto Group, Bonprix and the World Retail Congress. Previously, he also served as Non-executive director for Namshi.com in Dubai.
