= Strauss (company) =

German brand manufacturer

Strauss Deutschland GmbH & Co. KG
- Industry: Workwear, personal protective equipment, safety footwear
- Founded: 1948
- Founder: Engelbert Strauss
- Headquarters: Biebergemünd (Hesse), Germany
- Revenue: €1.4 billion (2023)
- Owner: Henning Strauss; Steffen Strauss
- Number of employees: 1,700 (2023)
- Website: strauss.com

Strauss Deutschland GmbH & Co. KG is a German manufacturer of workwear, safety footwear and personal protective equipment. Headquartered in Biebergemünd, Hesse, Germany, it had a revenue of approximately €1.4 billion in 2023. The corporate logo shows an ostrich which is "strauss" in the German language.

== History ==
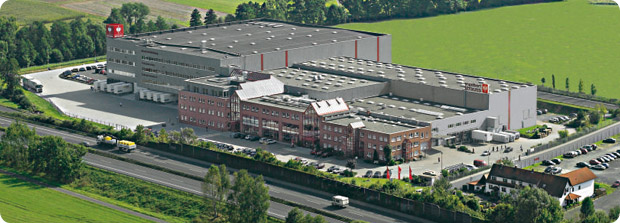
Strauss headquarters in Biebergemünd

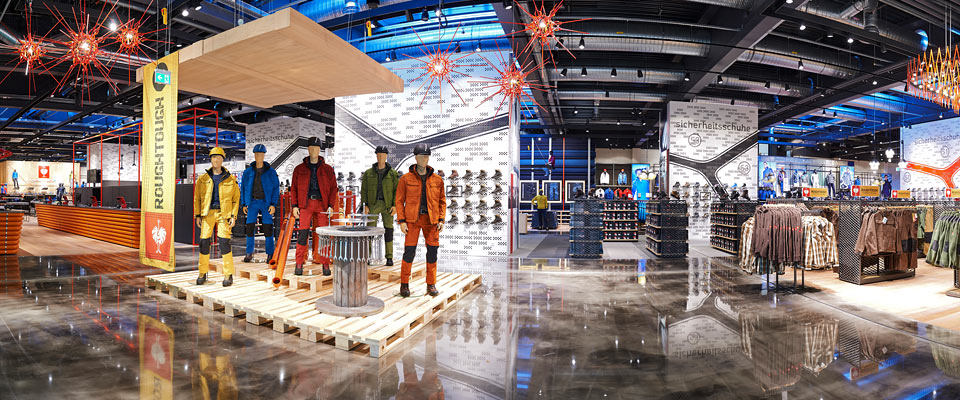
Interior view of the Strauss speciality store in Biebergemünd

Logo as of 2009

=== Foundation and beginnings ===
The company’s history began with Engelbert Strauss (*1908). His father, August, had already been working as a travelling salesman across Germany from as early as 1902, selling brooms (German Besen) and brushes manufactured in Kassel – a district of Biebergemünd known as Besenkassel.

After World War II, around 1948, Engelbert Strauss continued the family trading tradition and founded the company bearing his name. Eventually, he expanded the product range to include work protection clothing. The first products were gloves, which still remain part of the product range in 2024. In the 1960s the company switched to mail order business, and started its catalogue business in 1973. Over time, the product range grew to include clothing and footwear, such as overalls, high-visibility vests, chainsaw-protection trousers, and safety boots. In the early 1990s, the company relocated its headquarters to Biebergemünd. During the same decade, it also began developing its online shop.

=== Brand expansion and transformation ===
In 1996, Strauss expanded and opened its first subsidiary in Austria. After the founding of a second subsidiary in England in 2002, others followed, including in the Netherlands, Belgium, Switzerland, the Czech Republic, Sweden, and Denmark.

In 2008, the company began using cinema advertising as well as collaborations with bands to produce original promotional songs. In the Frankfurter Allgemeine Zeitung, Sebastian Balster describes these measures as marking the beginning of the transformation from a retailer into a lifestyle outfitter. Strauss also supplied equipment for the television show Zuhause im Glück – Unser Einzug in ein neues Leben. In the years that followed, this transformation was further driven by sports sponsorships.

In 2015 the company was awarded the German Logistics Prize and in 2016 it was awarded the European Logistics Prize.

In 2020, Strauss opened the CI Factory, a new logistics and distribution centre with its own production facilities in the immediate vicinity of its headquarters. In 2022, the Strauss CI Factory Chattogram was added as another company location in Bangladesh. In October 2023, Strauss launched a new site in Los Angeles with the independently operated Engelbert Strauss, Inc.

In 2024, the company opened the Alea Resort in Bad Orb, featuring a hotel, spa, and flats – a project that involved an investment in the tens of millions. The same year, Strauss entered into a partnership with Bauhaus. As part of this collaboration, Strauss launched four pop-up stores within Bauhaus branches, making Strauss products available in external retail for the first time.

== Company structure ==
Strauss in managed by the fourth generation of the family. The managing directors are Steffen and Henning Strauss, the grandsons of company founder Engelbert Strauss. The company employs around 1,700 people. In 2023, the company achieved a turnover of €1.4 billion.

=== Locations ===
In addition to its online shop, the company operates four of its own retail outlets, known as Workwearstores, located in Biebergemünd directly next to its headquarters, in Hockenheim (near Mannheim), Bergkirchen (near Munich), and Oberhausen (in the Ruhr region). The Schlüchtern site houses an in-house shoe factory, as well as facilities for customising workwear. The Campus in the Paddies functions both as a Workwear Academy and as a development centre for professional clothing, and also houses a small-scale production unit.

In 2023, the company manufactured in 28 countries worldwide, with 90% of its production taking place in Asia. Some production facilities in Southeast Asia work exclusively for the company. The largest production partners in 2023 were located in Bangladesh (41% PA), China (21%), Vietnam (11% PA), Laos (8% PA), Myanmar (7%), and Turkey (5%). In Bangladesh alone, products are manufactured in 15 facilities employing around 15,000 people in total.

=== Products ===
Strauss supplies workwear and safety equipment, including textiles, footwear, tools, and accessories for trades people, industry, and the construction sector. The company offers in-house textile customisation, including embroidery, printing, and laser technology. Children's products are also available.

== Branding, partner- and sponsorships ==
According to journalists such as Sebastian Balster from Frankfurter Allgemeine Zeitung and Jonas Metzner from the German Business Insider, the original workwear brand has evolved beyond its initial target audience to establish itself as a streetwear and lifestyle brand. Initially, Strauss primarily supplied workwear for tradespeople, gardeners, and manual workers. This changed when the company began expanding its target audience through modern designs. As Metzner notes, Strauss transformed into a cult brand through its strategic sponsorship activities.

The brand has received awards, such as the Goldene Brandzeichen (Golden Branding Iron) in 2021, awarded by the Marketing Club Frankfurt. In 2024, the brand was honoured with the TW Forum Award, which has been presented annually by the German magazine Textilwirtschaft since 1959.

=== Social partnerships ===
Strauss has been a member of the Fair Wear Foundation since 2016, an independent, non-profit organisation that works with its members to improve working conditions in the textile industry. Another partner is the Deutsche Gesellschaft für Internationale Zusammenarbeit (GIZ). Together with GIZ, Strauss has been establishing a chair for sustainability and textile innovation at the Ahsanullah University of Science and Technology (AUST) in Bangladesh's capital Dhaka since February 2020. A school was also opened in north-west Bangladesh in 2024 in cooperation with the Don Bosco Mission.

Other project partners are the Technical University of Dresden (TUD) and the United Nations University Institute for Integrated Management of Material Fluxes and of Resources (UNU-FLORES).

In addition, Strauss has been a member of the Alliance for Sustainable Textiles since 2015. The federal government's initiative aims to make social and ecological improvements in global textile production. The company has been a Bluesign system partner since 2013, and supports the Cotton made in Africa initiative. The company claims to be committed to climate and environmental protection. In a pilot project together with Bundesforst, 1000 giant trees are to be preserved in the North Hessian Oberaula, part of the forest area can develop back into a primeval forest without forestry intervention. Strauss promotes antonius – Human Network.

=== Culture ===
In 2019, Strauss cooperated with the US rock band Metallica and outfitted the tour crew. In May 2022, the partnership was continued with a new collection.

In 2023, Strauss also announced a collaboration with Nintendo, launching a Super Mario collection. The same year, Strauss released a Fast & Furious collection and supplied clothing for the film’s production team. The company also maintains a partnership with the American Stuntmen’s Association, supplying it with functional clothing.

=== Sports ===
Since 2010, Strauss has been a partner of the German national football team. Over the years, the partnership has expanded and, as of 2025, includes collaborations with the men’s and women’s national teams, the U21 national team, the men’s DFB-Pokal, the women’s DFB-Pokal final, and the DFB-ePokal. During the 2019/2020 DFB-Cup season, the Strauss logo was featured on the sleeves of Eintracht Frankfurt's jersey.

From 2012 to 2014, the company was an advertising partner of the Four Hills Tournament and from 2012 to 2013, a sponsor of the FIM Endurance World Championship. Since 2014, the company has repeatedly acted as sponsor of the European Women's and Men's Handball Championships, as well as the Champions Hockey League and the IIHF Ice Hockey World Championship. Since summer 2021, it has also collaborated with FC Bayern Munich. In 2024, the company became a sponsor of Liverpool F.C. and Los Angeles FC. Strauss is also a partner of the Mexico national football team.

Until 2027, Strauss is an official partner of the UEFA Europa League and UEFA Conference League. In collaboration with the UEFA Foundation for Children, Strauss provided shirts for the 22 player escorts at the finals in 2022, 2023, and 2024. Strauss was also the official workwear partner of UEFA Euro 2024 in Germany, launching a campaign that recruited and kitted out 12 ball kids for all 51 matches.

In 2022 and 2023, Strauss was the title sponsor of the Prime League, a League of Legends esports regional league for the Germany–Austria–Switzerland region.

Since the release of Farming Simulator 22, players have been able to dress their characters in Strauss workwear. Strauss has also been featured as an in-game advertising partner in EA Sports’ FIFA series since FIFA 21, a partnership which continued into EA Sports FC 24.

In February 2023, the Kansas City Chiefs of the NFL named Strauss its workwear sponsor in Germany as part of the NFL's "International Home Marketing Area" program, ahead of their NFL International Series game in the 2023 season. In August 2023, the NFL announced a league-wide sponsorship with Strauss as European workwear partner.

In 2024, Major League Baseball announced a sponsorship with Strauss through 2027, in which the company's logo will appear on all helmets worn by players during postseason games beginning that year, all neutral site games played in Europe beginning in 2025, and all Minor League Baseball games beginning in 2025.
