= Bonprix =

German fashion retailer

Bonprix Handelsgesellschaft mbH
- Type: GmbH
- Industry: Multichannel fashion sale
- Founded: 1986; 40 years ago
- Headquarters: Hamburg, Germany
- Key people: Torben Hansen (managing director), Kai Heck, Carolin Klar, Matthias Wlaka, Marcus Ackermann (Chairman)
- Revenue: €1.52 billion (2023/24)
- Owner: Otto Group
- Number of employees: 2500 (2024)
- Website: en.bonprix.de

Bonprix Handelsgesellschaft mbH (stylised: bonprix Handelsgesellschaft mbH) is a German fashion company, headquartered in Hamburg. It is a subsidiary of Otto Group and is active in over 25 predominantly European markets.

As a multichannel provider, the company operates online and mobile shops as well as a mail order catalogue. In Germany, Bonprix is one of the largest online shops and ranked 4th in the 2023 EHI Retail Institute ranking of the highest-grossing online shops in the main product segment of fashion.

== History ==
=== Company history ===
Bonprix Handelsgesellschaft mbH was founded in 1986 as a subsidiary of Otto Group. In 1989, the company reached a revenue of DM1 million for the first time.

Since the 1990s, Bonprix has been expanding into various countries. In 2009, the American swimwear manufacturer Venus Swimwear was acquired and expanded in the following years. In 2010, the company achieved sales of over €1 billion for the first time.

=== Development of the business model ===
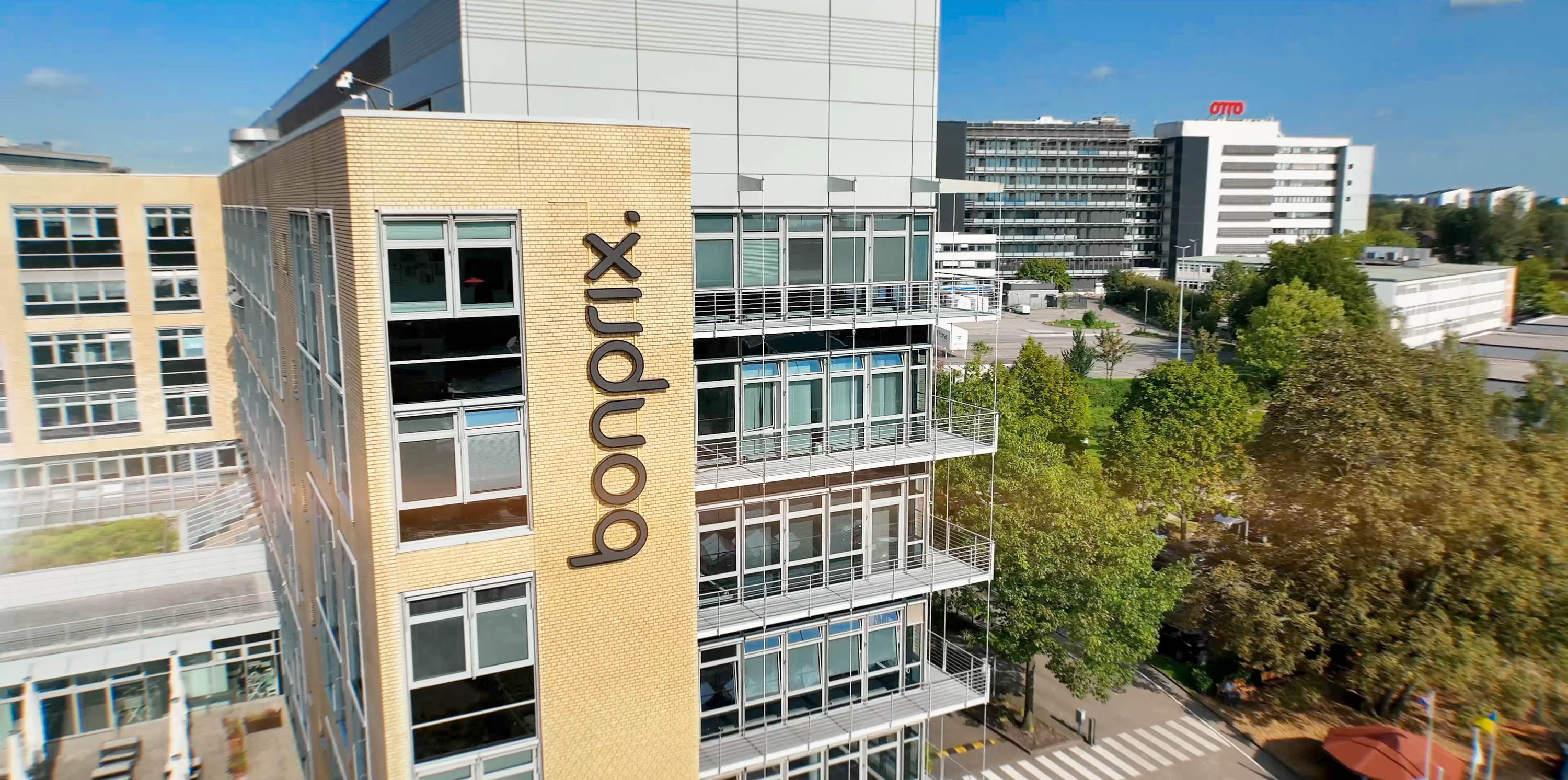
Bonprix headquarters in Hamburg

The first Bonprix mail order catalogue was released in 1986, featuring 32 pages; by 2015, the catalogues had expanded to over 200 pages.

The company's German webshop went online in 1997. By 2020, online shops had been launched in eight other countries. In 2011, Bonprix launched the first German webshop for mobile devices, followed by international mobile shops. In 2016, the Bonprix app was introduced.

Bonprix opened a first retail store in 1999 in Hamburg. Further stores followed in Germany and other countries. Since 2016, the company has been restructuring its retail network; by 2020, most retail stores had closed. In 2019, the "Fashion Connect Store" opened in Hamburg, a pilot project for a digitally assisted shopping experience. This last store was closed in 2023, meaning that Bonprix no longer has a location-based retail business.

== Business operations ==
=== Corporate structure ===
The Bonprix Group consists of seven companies, all of which are part of the Otto Group. In the fiscal year 2023/2024, the Bonprix Group generated a revenue of €1.52 billion and is thus one of the highest-grossing companies in the Otto Group. Overall, Bonprix sells its products in over 25 countries and employs around 2500 people. In 2019, more than 54% of the revenue was generated abroad. As of 2023, online sales account for around 90% of sales.

=== Products ===
Bonprix's product range includes clothing, shoes, and accessories for women, men, and children, as well as home textiles, furniture, and decorative items. The collections are designed in-house and produced on a contract manufacturing basis. Bonprix primarily sells its own brands, except for shoes, where third-party brands are also offered. The company operates a logistics centre in Hamburg, which is one of the largest of its kind in Europe.

=== Distribution channels ===
Bonprix follows a multichannel strategy. The company primarily sells its products through online and mobile shops, as well as catalogues. E-commerce has become the company's most important distribution channel; in the 2020/21 fiscal year, around 88% of sales were generated through online and mobile shops. Bonprix's logistics partner since 1996 has been the Otto subsidiary Hermes Fulfilment.

=== Sustainability ===
Since 2017, the company has been increasingly using sustainable materials and climate-friendly transport. Sustainably sourced fibres made up about half of the textile materials used in 2021. This share is planned to be increased to 100% by 2030 as part of the company's corporate responsibility strategy. By the end of 2031, all main materials are to be made from organic wool and fibres.

== Awards ==
- 1st place in the "Best Brand Shop" category at the Internet World Business Shop Awards 2019.
- 1st place in the "Fashion and Accessories" category at the German Online Retail Awards 2019.
