= Barbara Turf =

American business executive and schoolteacher (1943–2014)

Barbara Turf (February 28, 1943 – July 12, 2014) was an American business executive and former schoolteacher who served as the CEO of Crate & Barrel, a houseware and furniture retail chain, from 2008 until 2012. Crate & Barrel is headquartered in Northbrook, Illinois.

Turf was born Barbara Dorini to Italian immigrant parents in Chicago. She was raised in the Little Village neighborhood of Chicago. Her mother, Minnie Dorini, was a seamstress, while her father, Angelo Dorini, worked for the city of Chicago. She earned a bachelor's degree from the University of Illinois at Urbana–Champaign and began her career as a teacher at Mater Christi Catholic School and Longfellow Public School.

In 1967, Turf began working as a temporary summer employee at Crate & Barrel's original store on Wells Street in Chicago. She soon left the teaching profession to join Crate & Barrel as a full-time employee. She began working at the company's headquarters in 1974. Turf worked in the personnel, merchandising and marketing departments during her first twenty years with the company.

In 1996, Turf was promoted to President of Crate & Barrel. Under Turf, the company acquired The Land of Nod, a children's brand, in 2000. She also launched CB2, a division of Crate & Barrel aimed at a younger, hipper consumer demographic.

Turf became CEO of Crate & Barrel in 2008, succeeding retiring CEO and company founder, Gordon Segal. As CEO, Barbara Turf expanded Crate & Barrel into new overseas emerging markets in Asia and the Middle East. She also shepherded the company during the 2008 financial crisis and the resulting economic downturn during the following years. Turf retired as CEO in 2012, but remained with Crate & Barrel by joining its board of directors.

In addition to Crate & Barrel, Turf served on the boards of directors for Ann Taylor Stores Corp. and the Gucci Group.

Turf was diagnosed with the pancreatic cancer. Crate & Barrel's founders, husband and wife Gordon and Carol Segal, established the Chicago Pancreatic Cancer Initiative in her honor and donated millions to pancreatic cancer research.

Barbara Turf died from pancreatic cancer on July 12, 2014, at age 71. She had resided in Winnetka, Illinois, since 1998.
