= Yatego =

Online shopping center

- Website type: Ecommerce
- Founded: 2003
- Headquarters: Sankt Georgen im Schwarzwald, {{{location_country}}}
- Employees: 110
- Website: www.yatego.com

Yatego is a virtual shopping mall where traders are able sell their goods. Each trader has an online shop that is also integrated in the Yatego platform. After the login process customers may make their purchases throughout the platform in all shops.

Yatego was founded in Munich by Michael Ollmann in 2003. The Yatego website was launched in June 2003.

== Development ==
When Yatego was launched it featured about 100 traders. This table shows the growth of the Yatego platform.

Month/Year	Traders	Products
04/2003	about 200	about 400.000
04/2004	612	586.508
04/2005	1.226	948.639
04/2006	1.982	1,34 Mill.
04/2007	4.086	1,81 Mill.
04/2008	5.613	2,1 Mill.
04/2009	7.278	2,6 Mill.
04/2010	8.548	3,1 Mill.
04/2011	10.200	3,7 Mill.

According to Nielsen NetRatings the Yatego platform grew by 137% in 2006. ComScore listed Yatego as the fastest growing website in Germany.

Yatego was one of the winners of "Jobmotor 2008" (Job-engine) because the company created jobs during times of commercial and financial crisis. There are three company categories nominated to "Jobmotor 2008": Small companies (up to 20 employees), medium-sized companies (from 20 to 200 employees) and large companies (exceeding 200 employees). Yatego was the winner in the category of the medium-sized companies.

== Navigation ==
Search function

Yatego can be searched for merchandise in all categories and for keywords (optionally to defined prices). While entering a search term the Yatego System shows suggestions of completed terms in a drop-down menu, also displaying the quantity of articles listed for the search term. A correction tool promotes an effective search in which the system recognizes that a more common search term creates more results (for example by correcting the spelling). Yatego also offers an advanced search option where the description of the article is also being scanned.

Yatego may be searched by brand, top sellers, bargain-priced goods, themes, traders/shops, branches, and coupons.

Categories

All goods on Yatego are published in categories divided into a maximum of three levels (Main category - mid-level category - subcategory).

== Order process ==
Payment

When Yatego receives an order, the buyer needs to pay directly to a trader or dealer. There are various forms of payment which vary from trader to trader. P

Shipping

The trader who has received the customer's payment ships the products. Shipping methods and costs vary from trader to trader.

Cooperations

- Safety: The Yatego platform cooperates with iClear payment intermediary service and EHI Retail Institute.
- Price search engines: The Yatego platform provides the possibility to export the products into price search engines such as Google product search, Kelkoo and Milando.
- Payment providers: EOS Payment Solutions, Elavon Merchant Service, Wirecard, American Express, Moneybookers, Sofortüberweisung
- Environment/Waste management: Landbell
- Import of articles: Yatego allows traders to import their articles from other online-shop systems, in some cases using the service of a third party service provider (such as XT-Commerce, OSCommerce, OXID eSales, plentyMarkets, Afterbuy (via PX Webdesign) and JTL ERP).
- Export of orders: Yatego features special interfaces to third party data processing tools such as Afterbuy and AuktionMaster for automatic transfer of product and customer information. Ordering data may be exported as a CSV-file or can be sent via POST for continued automated processing. Yatego maintains a certified order link to the inventory control system "Actindo".
- Legal texts: Yatego maintains a partnership with legal document services Protected Shops. Yatego merchants are able to receive the legal texts for their Yategoshop automatically.
- Shipping: A cooperation agreement between DHL shipping services and Yatego enables connected dealers to forward ordered merchandise at lower rates.
- Participating Investors: Acton Capital Partners

== Quality management ==
The assignation to categories is generally automated. Yatego provides a constant manual control of the category's content. To open a new online-shop, a trader must present a valid business registration. For larger shops quality control is obligatory.

== Awards and nominations ==
- Job engine 2008 (by the chamber of trade commerce, the chamber of industry and commerce Freiburg and Constance and the association of industrial enterprises of the region Baden (WVIB))
- Nomination for "company of the year 2009 (Oskar Patzelt-Preis)
- Company of the month September (Association of Promotion of Business of the region Schwarzwald-Baar-Heuberg mbH)
- Runner-up at the "Lea-price of small and medium-sized businesses for social responsibility (Caritas/Department of commerce of the federal state of Baden-Württemberg)
- Awardee at the "Ausbildungsass 2009"-price (Ace of professional formation 2009)
- 5th place at the Deloitte Fast50 technology-award and nominee for Fast500 EMEA

== Engagement ==
- For retail: Yatego maintains contact with public institutions, such as the association to promote the economy and the Chamber of Industry and Commerce. In September 2009 Yatego and Baden-Württemberg's secretary of economy Ernst Pfister discussed the common goal to promote the stationary retail industry.
- Legal aspects: in May 2007 Yatego founded an arbitration board as a reaction to the wave of admonitions in online business Customers may also consult the arbitration board in case of doubts and questions.
- The children's aid organization "Aktion Kindertraum": Since the foundation of Yatego, the company donates to the children's aid organization "Aktion Kindertraum". In the pre-Christmas period 2008 Yatego donated 5 Euro for every indemnity contract signed between a trader that sells on Yatego and the Landbell company.
- For fair internships and real opportunities for graduates: Yatego joined the initiative "Fair company"

== In the media ==
- Yatego enjoys favorable response by the local press.
- The radio station SWR reported about the award Job motor 2008. The radio station Radio 7 reported about the award "company of the month september".
- Yatego appears mainly on the internet. Life-style magazines and specialized press also comment.
- The cooperations of Yatego have been reported.
- In Oct. 2009 Yatego and IP Germany announced the entry of Yatego in TV-advertisement. In Nov. 2009 Yatego appeared as sponsor of German TV channel VOX's TV series "Wohnen nach Wunsch- Das Haus" (Living as you desire - the home). Producer of the spots is the well-known advertisement agency Jung von Matt. In 2011 Yatego intends to continue these activities.
- On the social network Facebook Yatego is represented since 2010 with a separate page.

== Further information ==
As Yatego reached the number of 10.000 connected dealers the company celebrated that achievement by initiating an E-Commerce Fair at the St. Georgen Civic Center, to which all dealers, partners and the interested public were invited. The event was accompanied by lectures on the subjects of online trading and online retailers.
