= Tony Rampton =

Tony Rampton may refer to:

- Tony Rampton (basketball)
- Tony Rampton (businessman)
