= Lifestyle store =

Retail store identified with a lifestyle

A lifestyle store is a retail store that sells products from several categories under a single brand. The format is intended to associate the brand with a particular aspirational lifestyle. Lifestyle stores may sell clothing, housewares, furniture, stationery, gifts and other consumer products.

Examples of lifestyles associated with such brands include "fashionable", "active", "healthy" and "back-to-basics".

== History ==
Design Research, founded in 1953, has been described as an early example of the lifestyle-store format. The retailer carried a broad range of products, including furniture, clothing, toys and cookware, across different price ranges.

Lifestyle stores include:

- Design Research (defunct)
- Habitat (known as "Conran's" in the U.S.)
- Crate & Barrel
- Workbench
- Muji
- Pottery Barn

The term has also been used for stores carrying multiple product lines from a single fashion brand.
