= Design Research (store) =

Retail store chain (US, 1953–1978)

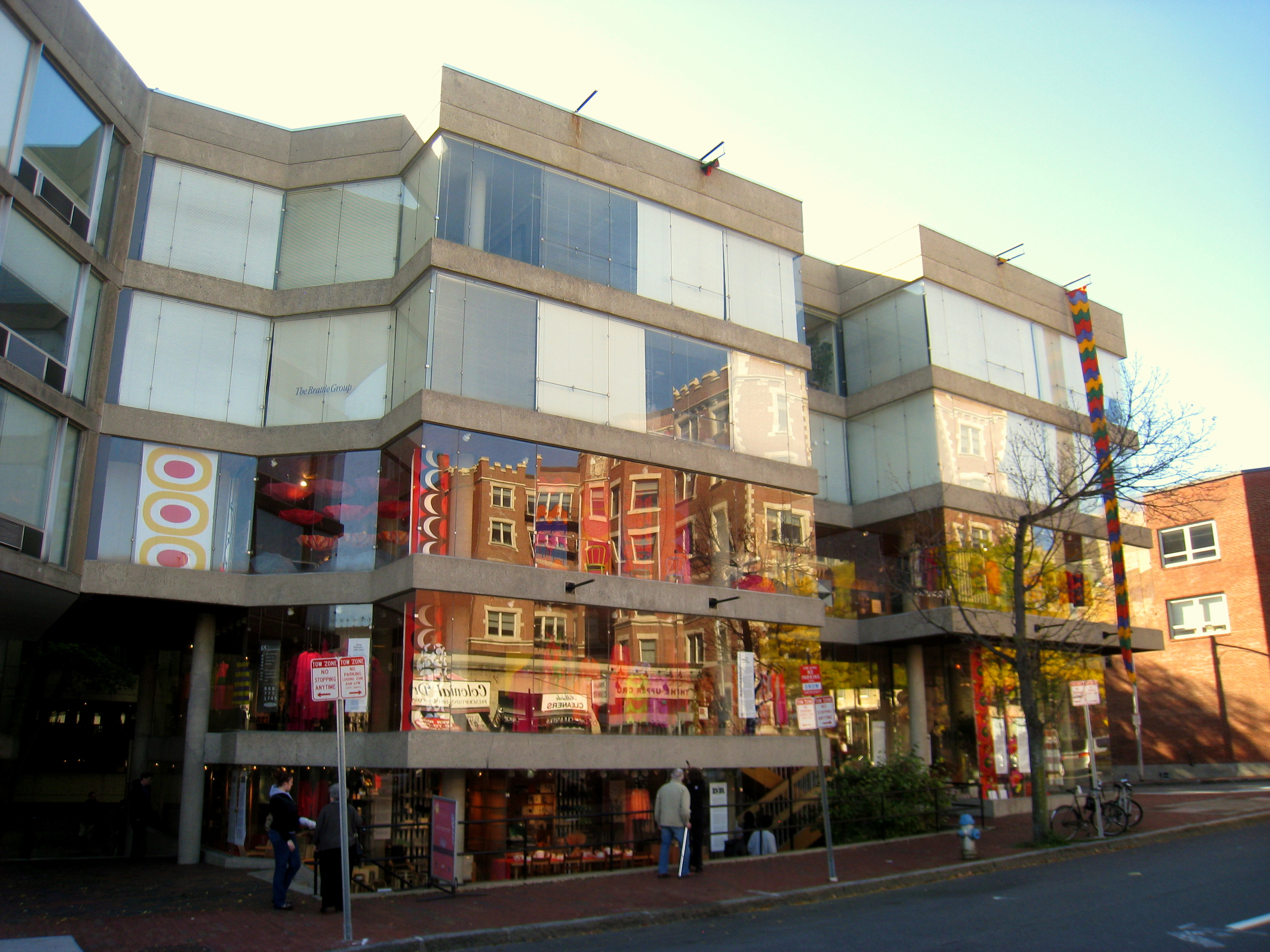
- Design Research was temporarily revived as a street-visible exhibition in 2009
- Trade name: D/R
- Founded: 1953; 73 years ago in Cambridge, Massachusetts
- Founder: Ben Thompson
- Defunct: 1978
- Fate: Bankruptcy; Brand rights acquired jointly by Crate & Barrel and Pottery Barn

Design Research (abbreviated and trademarked as D/R) was a retail store founded in 1953 by Ben Thompson in Cambridge, Massachusetts, and which introduced the concept of lifestyle store. In the 1970s under subsequent ownership, it became a chain of a dozen stores across the United States, and went bankrupt in 1979. Thompson's goal was to provide "a place where people could buy everything they needed for contemporary living", notably modern European furnishings and in particular Scandinavian design.

Without question, D/R was the most influential force in twentieth-century America in creating an awareness and appreciation for modern design in the consumer world.

— Rob Forbes, founder
Design Within Reach

D/R has continued to have an outsized reputation: in 2000, a survey of influential design stores named D/R as number one, though it had then been closed for 22 years. The store influenced later retailers like Crate & Barrel, Design Within Reach, Pottery Barn, Workbench, and Conran's.

== Selection of products ==
The genius of Ben Thompson was that he wasn't a retailer, so he didn't approach retailing in a conventional way at all... Eventually we took the whole idea and translated it into a reproducible formula.

— Lon Habkirk
Crate & Barrel

Design Research carried an eclectic selection of products, from furniture to clothing, from toys to pots and pans, at a wide range of prices, introducing the idea of a lifestyle store. It carried furnishings by such designers as Marcel Breuer, Hans Wegner, Alvar Aalto, and Joe Colombo.

Design Research was the exclusive US representative for the Finnish clothing and textiles of Marimekko from 1959 to 1976. Jacqueline Kennedy was pictured on the cover of Sports Illustrated in 1960 in a Marimekko sundress purchased at D/R.

== Stores ==
The original Design Research store was in a 19th-century wood frame mansard house at 57 Brattle Street, in Harvard Square, Cambridge. D/R later added stores in Hyannis Port, Massachusetts; Lexington Avenue (1961) and East 57th Street (1964) in New York City; and Ghirardelli Square in San Francisco (1965).

Harvard University bought the original Brattle Street store and demolished it in 1969 to build the Gutman Library of its School of Education.

This marvelous building... is conceived as a five-story glass showcase, faceted like the surface of a diamond. The facade is so transparent that the merchandise on display indoors becomes part of the architecture.

— Robert Campbell
architecture critic, The Boston Globe

In 1969, Thompson opened a new, much larger, Cambridge store in his revolutionary new building on Brattle Street with entirely glass walls.

Until 1969, D/R stores were all located in urban areas, but under new management, D/R opened stores in suburban shopping malls, which Thompson disapproved of: South Shore Plaza in Braintree, Massachusetts (1972); South Coast Plaza in Costa Mesa, California (1972); and The Mall at Chestnut Hill in Newton, Massachusetts (1974). The company also opened urban stores at the Embarcadero Center in San Francisco (1973), and in downtown Philadelphia in Rittenhouse Square (1975).

=== The Brattle Street store ===
In 1969, Thompson moved the original Cambridge store to a revolutionary new 24,000-square-foot (2,200 m^{2}) building designed by his firm, Benjamin Thompson and Associates, at 48 Brattle Street in Harvard Square, on a block that came to be known as "Architects' Corner". The 5-story building consists of flat concrete slabs supported by interior columns, and enclosed by frameless tempered glass walls. The use of butted glass with no frame or mullions was unprecedented, and "allowed D/R to be a building almost 'without architecture'".

It immediately received favorable reviews: "points the way to a method of glass building that could create a warmer city, adding color and light and optimism to the life of the streets". The building won many awards over the years:

- 1970: New England AIA Honor Award, New England Chapter of the American Institute of Architects
- 1971: Harleston Parker Medal for Outstanding Architecture, Boston Society of Architects
- 1971: National Honor Award, American Institute of Architects
- 2003: AIA Twenty-five Year Award for "architecture of enduring significance"

==== Later tenants ====
Since D/R closed in 1979, the Brattle Street building has had various tenants:

- from 1979-January 2009, a Crate & Barrel store;
- from October 2009 to April 2010, a temporary installation of D/R goods, visible from the street but not open to the public;
- from August 2010 to January 2025, an Anthropologie store;
- from November 2025, a Muji store.

== Corporate history ==
Design Research was started by the architect Ben Thompson in 1953. Spencer Field, a furniture designer, joined the firm as a 50-50 business partner in the early 1950s. By 1966, it was clear that the company was underfinanced for Thompson's expansion plans, and he started looking for outside investors. The company was reorganized as a new corporate entity in 1967 and was recapitalized, with Field's interest being bought out in February 1968 by Peter J. Sprague, an entrepreneur and chairman of National Semiconductor, who became chairman.

In 1969, Sprague forced Thompson out as director of the company, but Thompson remained a stockholder. Under a succession of presidents, D/R opened more new stores, but Thompson felt that they had lost their distinctive style and approach. By 1976, the business was deteriorating, and in 1979 it declared bankruptcy. Rights to the names "Design Research" and "D/R" were bought jointly by Crate & Barrel and Pottery Barn.

== Bibliography ==
- Janet Levy, "Design Research: Marketing 'Good design' in the 50s, 60s, and 70s", Master of Arts thesis at Parsons The New School for Design, 2004. chapter list
- Walter J. Salmon, "Design Research, Inc.", Harvard Business School Case 578-203 (not seen)
- Thompson, Jane; Lange, Alexandra (2010). Design Research: the store that brought modern living to American homes. San Francisco: Chronicle Books. ISBN 978-0-8118-6818-1.
- Andrew Wagner, "Partners in Design", Dwell October/November 2005 full text original magazine spread
- "Ben Thompson", ArchitectureBoston, Spring 2011 issue, Boston Society of Architects. Issue is dedicated entirely to Thompson with articles by various authors.
