= EOS Group =

German holding company

EOS Holding GmbH

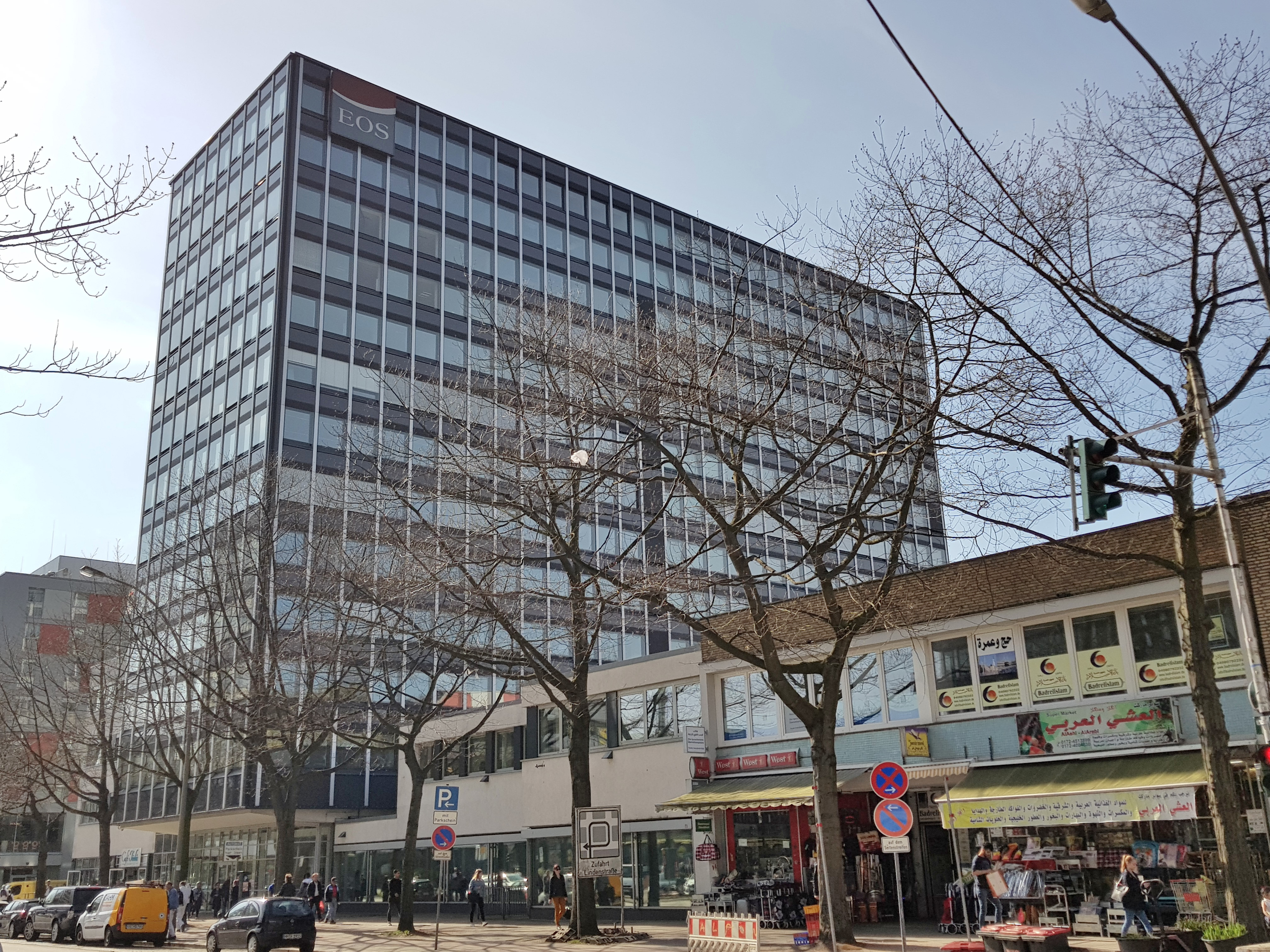
- EOS Building in Hamburg
- Trade name: EOS Group
- Type: GmbH
- Industry: Debt collection, financial services
- Founded: 1974
- Headquarters: St. Georg, Hamburg, Germany
- Key people: Marwin Ramcke
- Revenue: EUR 853,1 million (fiscal 2019/20) Number of employees was 7,578 (fiscal 2019/20)
- Net income: 316,746,000 (2026)
- Total assets: 3,742,074,000 (2026)
- Number of employees: 7,578 (fiscal 2019/20)
- Parent: Otto Group
- Website: eos-solutions.com

The EOS Group is a holding company that operates financial services companies with locations in Europe, the United States and Canada. Its core activity is receivables management including receivables purchasing and debt collection. The group, which has its headquarters in Hamburg, is part of the Otto Group.

== Company history ==
=== The first three decades ===
Deutscher Inkasso-Dienst (DID), the nucleus of the group, was established in 1974 as a spin-off of the legal department of Otto-Versand (now: OTTO). The company dealt with collecting outstanding receivables for Otto-Versand and also for non-group companies. Early on, the service provider focused on correspondence and dialogue with defaulting payers and on the acquisition of external clients. In the 1980s and 1990s, the company grew through acquisitions in Germany, through expansion in Europe, and through expansion of its range of services.

In 2000 the EOS Holding was established, introducing the umbrella brand EOS. The company entered the US when it took over Collecto in 2001, a company founded in 1992. In 2004 the group established a special company for medical debt recovery, EOS Health Honorarmanagement AG, which established itself over the following years particularly as a service provider for dental practices.

=== Since 2005 ===
In July 2005 the group acquired a majority stake in Europe Matrix Financial Services S.A. with operations in Greece, Bulgaria, Macedonia and Serbia. In fiscal 2007/08 it entered Russia, China and the Benelux countries. At the same time the group acquired a stake in direct marketing specialist CoXulto (Stuttgart). By the end of this period the group had almost 3,500 employees. In 2009 the group purchased the Spanish debt collection service provider Acción de Cobro from Banco Pastor. It entered the Croatian market by establishing EOS Matrix d.o.o. Thanks to a majority shareholding in WCF Finetrading AG, the group expanded its activities in commodity pre-financing, a business segment that the company then relinquished in 2017.

A location in Ukraine was established in 2010. In the same year, the company strengthened its presence in the USA through the acquisition of True North AR. This was followed in 2011 by the purchase of a majority stake in Hoepers Recuperadora de Crédito S.A, a debt collection service provider in Brazil. Since April 2011 the company has also been offering its services in France following its takeover of debt collection company Credirec. The group acquired the Canadian debt collection company Nor-Don Collection Network (NCN) in 2011. In 2013 the group took over the debt collection unit of Spanish bank Banco Popular, and purchased the company SAF Forderungsmanagement from Deutsche Telekom. In 2015 it acquired the Swisscom debt collection subsidiary Alphapay. At the end of 2015 EOS and Euler Hermes sold Bürgel to CRIF. The group strengthened its market position in France and Belgium in 2016 through the purchase of Contentia.

In 2016 the group took on an administrative role (Verwaltungshelfer) for the recovery of outstanding debts for the administrative district of Wittenberg, and acted in a similar way in the same year for the Bundesagentur für Arbeit. The city of Essen engaged three debt collection service providers in 2016 including EOS.

On 1 March 2017 Klaus Engberding became Chairman of the Board of Directors of EOS Holding GmbH. He succeeded Hans-Werner Scherer, who had led the group for many years.

At the end of 2018, the Group sold Health AG and the Swiss Zahnärztekasse AG to BAWAG P.S.K.

On February 1, 2022, Marwin Ramcke took over as CEO.

== Present day ==
=== Range of services and customers ===
The group provides international financial services mainly in receivables management. Its three main areas of activity are fiduciary collection, receivables purchasing and business process outsourcing. The company says it serves around 20,000 customers, including primarily mail order companies and online retailers, banks, telecoms companies, utilities, the real estate business and the public sector.

=== Organisation and locations ===
EOS is a member of the Otto Group. It dominates the financial services segment within the group and is regarded within the group as having very high margins. At the beginning of the year 2020, the group included more than 60 operating companies. It has established locations in 26 countries in Europe and North America. The company's US subsidiary is EOS CCA.

=== Financial information ===
The group's fiscal year begins – like that of the Otto Group – on 1 March and ends on 28 February of the following year, or 29 February in leap years. In 2019/20 the company achieved a revenue of 853,1 million euros. Since 2005, credit rating agency Euler Hermes Rating has consistently awarded EOS Holding the rating A.

== Miscellaneous ==
=== Surveys on payment practices and financing methods ===
For many years the group has been conducting surveys on payment practices in various European countries. In addition, it investigates payment practices by systematically comparing specific countries or defined groups, e.g. of companies in Germany.

In 2003 the group funded a study at the Heinrich Heine University Düsseldorf on new financing methods for small and medium-sized enterprises. In addition, an "EOS Financial Panel" developed and operated over several years to investigate and inform on the use of various financing instruments.

=== Criticisms ===
The press occasionally criticises the debt collecting practices of group companies. This criticism is related to demands for payment of sums that are decades old, or demands made despite incorrect invoices or charges that are excessively high and/or are questionable. However, among debt counsellors the company is regarded as "a provider about which there are only a few complaints".

=== Data theft 2017 ===
In April 2017 around 33,000 files from EOS Schweiz AG got into the hands of the Süddeutsche Zeitung newspaper. They were said to include sensitive personal data like medical files, correspondence and credit card bills showing the names of creditors and debtors, their registered addresses and information on the amount of outstanding debt. The newspaper said that it had obtained the data from an informer, but the informer stated that they were acquired from hackers who had found a vulnerability in the server software. The company closed the security gap and announced an overhaul of processes.

=== Buildings ===
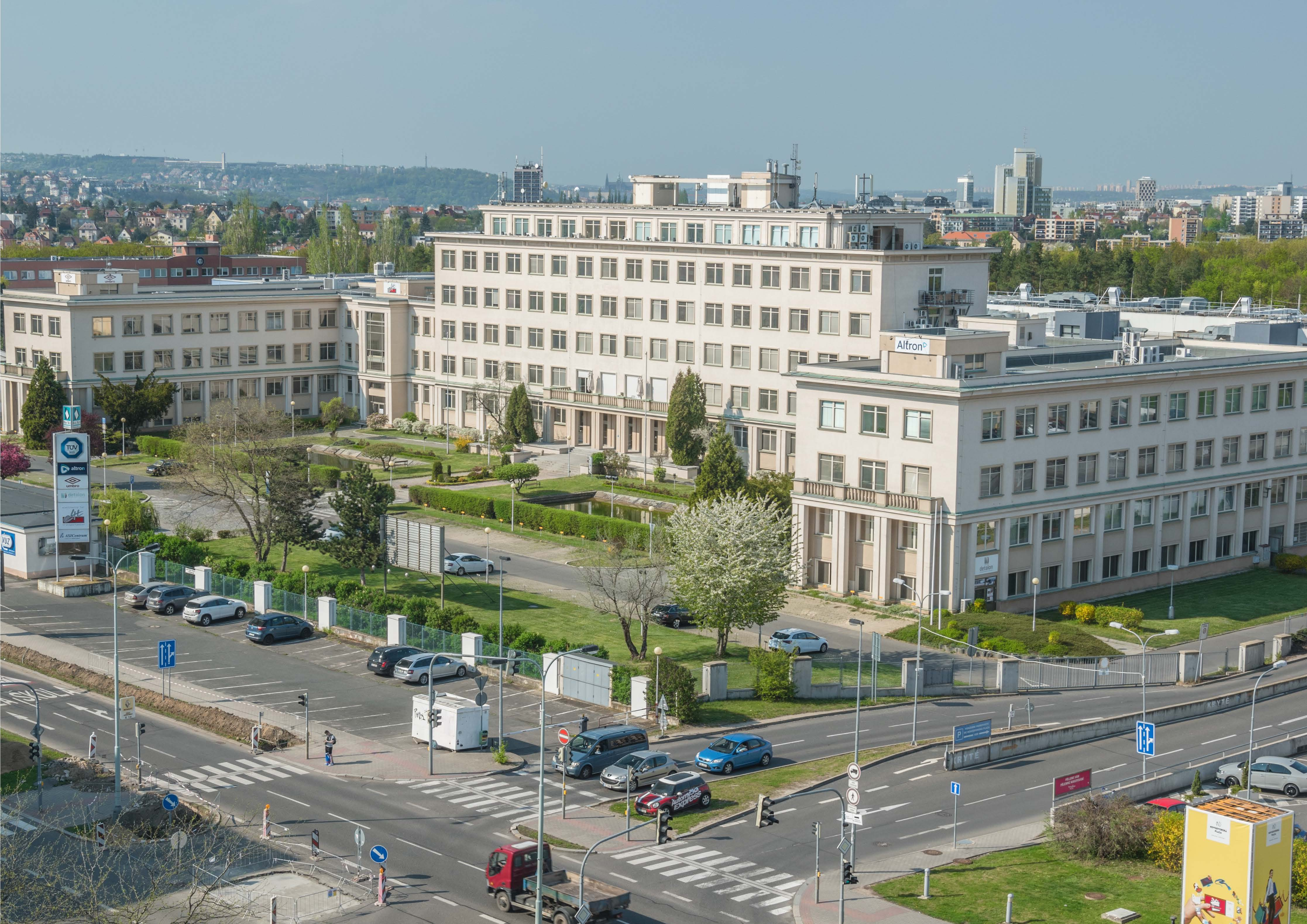
Building in Prague

The head office is located on the Steindamm, a street in Hamburg's St. Georg district. This property of the Karl and Rudolf Förster heirs was designed by Adolf Böhringer, built from 1966 to 1967, extended laterally in 2003 and energetically renovated in 2011.

The building that accommodates the company's Czech subsidiary EOS KSI Česká republika, s.r.o. was built in Prague between 1955 and 1958 according to plans produced by architect Karel Prager. It initially housed a research centre for communication named after Russian physicist Alexander Stepanovich Popov.
