= Hanseatic Bank =

Private bank based in Hamburg, Germany

- Type: GmbH & Co KG
- Industry: Banking, Financial services
- Founded: 1969
- Headquarters: Bramfelder Chaussee 101, 22177 Hamburg, Germany
- Number of locations: 1
- Area served: Germany
- Key people: Michel Billon (managing director); Detlef Zell (managing director)
- Products: Consumer credit (credit cards, personal loans) Deposit and savings Insurance Factoring (receivables management)
- Net income: €59 million (2020)
- Total equity: €433 million (2020)
- Number of employees: 545
- Website: www.hanseaticbank.de

Hanseatic Bank is a private bank based in Hamburg and operating throughout Germany, part of the Paris-based Société Générale group. It specializes in four core businesses: deposit-taking, real-estate related financing, receivables management and credit cards. The company's products are distributed by partners as well as directly in one of the ten branches, online or through its own service center. Additionally, within the framework of factoring collaborations, Hanseatic Bank acquires receivables from companies within and outside of the Otto Group. The bank has more than 500 employees working at the headquarter and the subsidiary Hanseatic Service Center GmbH in Hamburg.

== History ==
The bank was founded in 1969 as a consumer credit institution to finance goods purchased by customers of the mail order firm Otto Versand. At the time, the bank was operating under the name Hanseatic Bank Teilzahlungsfinanzierungs-GmbH & Co KG. Its initial activity consisted of providing Otto customers with consumer credits for their purchases from mail-order catalogues and managing the corresponding payment transactions.

In 1976, it was converted into a chartered universal bank. This enabled the product portfolio to be expanded to include all banking products. In addition to issuing consumer loans, savings certificates and deposits made it possible for customers to make secure investments. Later, this segment was further expanded to include transactions with funds and life insurance policies. A branch network was set up as part of the introduction of deposit-taking business. In 1976, branch offices were opened in Essen, Hanau, Hanover and Nuremberg in addition to Hamburg. In 1985, the bank was one of the first providers to introduce ATMs in Germany.

=== 1990 - 2005 ===
After the German reunification in 1990, the branch network was extended to the East German cities of Leipzig, Dresden, Erfurt, Schwerin and Rostock from 1991 to 1993. The factoring business with Otto and Schwab was also introduced in 1990.

The development of the real estate business started in the mid-1990s. From 1996 to 2005, the pre-financing of the state subsidy for owner-occupied homes was part of the portfolio. Since 1997, the bank offers its own product “EigentümerDarlehen”, a personal loan for home owners.

=== 2005 - present ===
Until 2005, Otto Versand held 90 percent and Schwab Versand 10 percent of the shares in Hanseatic Bank. In 2005, the major French bank Société Générale acquired 75 percent of the shares; Otto Group continues to own a 25-percent stake.

In 2006, Hanseatic Bank founded its subsidiary Hanseatic Service Center GmbH (HSCE), where the employees are responsible for the lending and deposit administration and answer customers’ and partners’ questions via phone and e-mail.

In 2007, the bank developed a customer credit card for Otto and Schwab customers. One year later, the bank's own GenialCard credit card was launched, followed by the GoldCard in 2015. In the meantime, the credit card business has been further expanded with cooperation partners.

On February 10, 2019 Hanseatic Bank celebrated its 50th anniversary.

In 2020, all branch locations outside of Hamburg were closed. Hanseatic Bank is currently only operating with one branch in Hamburg.

=== Former managing directors ===
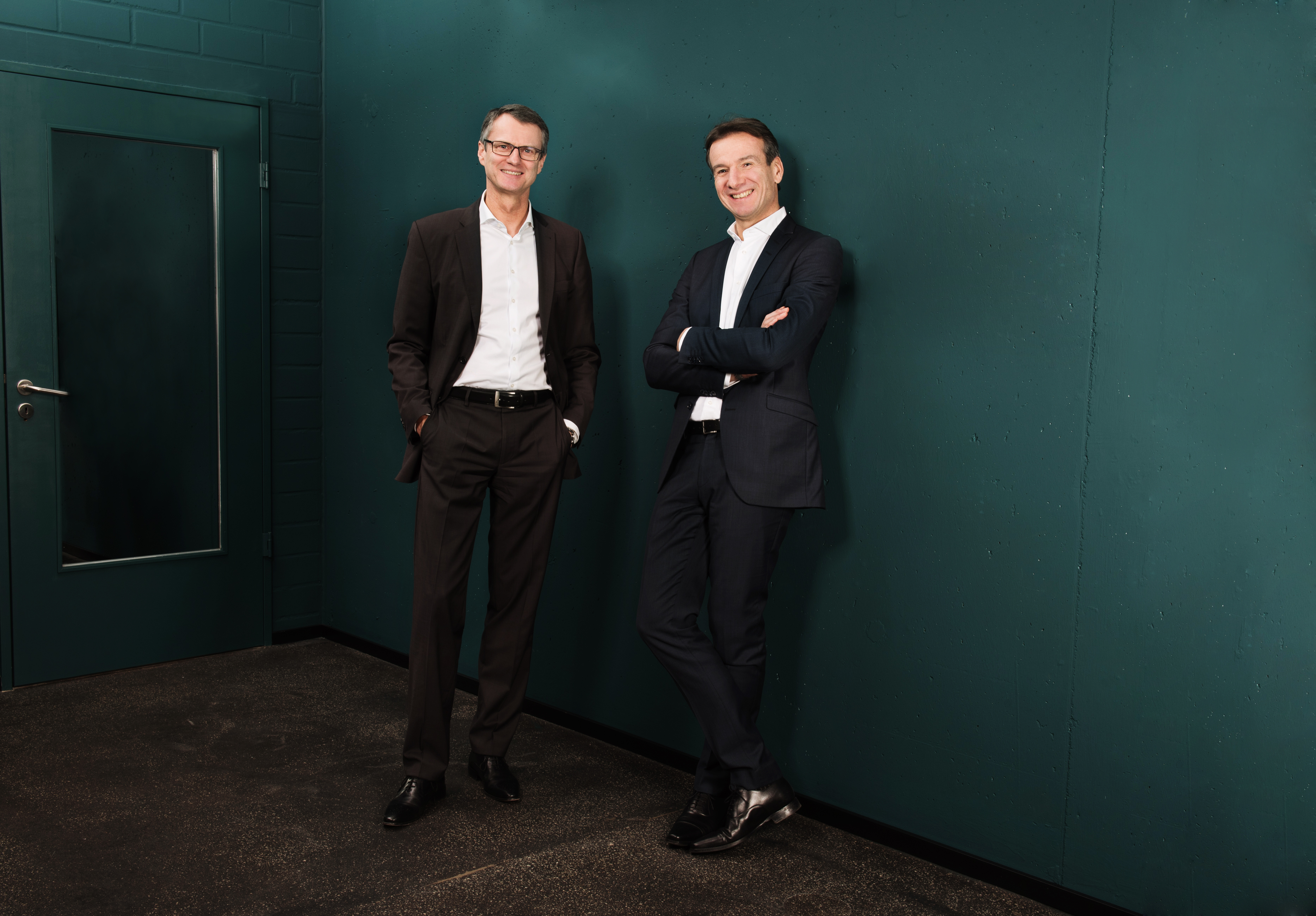
The managing directors of Hanseatic Bank: Detlef Zell and Michel Billon

Since its foundation, Hanseatic Bank has had 14 different managing directors. Currently, Detlef Zell and Michel Billon hold this office.

The managing directors in detail:

- until 1969: Horst Hansen
- 1969-1971: Wilhelm Hopp
- 1971-1973: Peter Ott
- 1973-1977: Walter Willhöft
- 1974-1985: Friedhelm Rüther
- 1977-1981: Dr. jur. Ullrich Pannwitz
- 1981-1992: Dr. jur. Michael E. Crüsemann
- 1981-1983: Hans Duve
- 1985-2001: Karl-Heinz Albien
- 1992-2007: Torsten Brandes
- 2001-now: Detlef Zell
- 2006-2009: Arnaud Leclair
- 2009-2010: Stéphane Riehl
- 2010-now: Michel Billon
