= Waltrop =

- Town
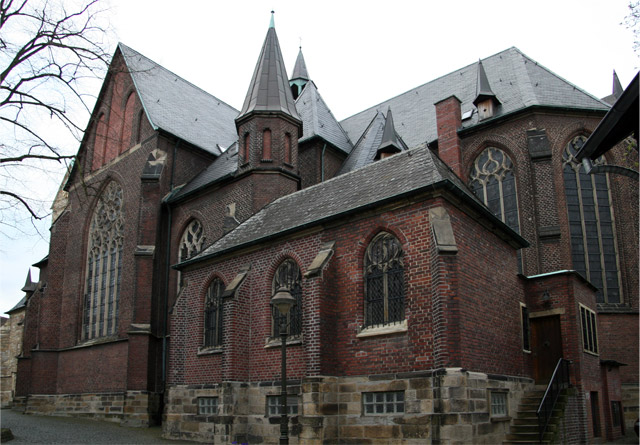
- Saint Peter Church

- Coat of arms

- Location of Waltrop within Recklinghausen district
- Interactive map of Waltrop
- Location within Germany Location within North Rhine-Westphalia
- Coordinates: 51°37′N 07°23′E
- Country: Germany
- State: North Rhine-Westphalia
- Admin. region: Münster
- District: Recklinghausen

Government
  - Mayor (2020–25): Marcel Mittelbach (SPD)

Area
  - Total: 47.09 km^{2} (18.18 sq mi)
- Elevation: 67 m (220 ft)

Population (2025-12-31)
  - Total: 29,125
  - Density: 618.5/km^{2} (1,602/sq mi)
- Time zone: UTC+01:00 (CET)
  - Summer (DST): UTC+02:00 (CEST)
- Postal codes: 45731
- Dialling codes: 02309, 02363 (Oberwiese)
- Vehicle registration: RE

Waltrop (German pronunciation: [ˈvaltʁɔp]) is a town in the district of Recklinghausen, in North Rhine-Westphalia, Germany. It is situated on the Datteln-Hamm Canal, approximately 15 km east of Recklinghausen and 15 km north-west of Dortmund.

== Division of the town ==
The town of Waltrop is surrounded by the Bauerschaften (rural boroughs) Lippe (Unterlippe/Oberlippe), Elmenhorst, Brockenscheidt, Leveringhausen, Oberwiese and Holthausen.

== History ==
People already settled in this area about 2,000 years ago.

The village developed around the parish church of St. Peter which was built in the 9th/10th century. It is known that in 1432 Waltrop was a part of the county Dortmund. After the Soest Feud, the archbishops of Cologne could intervene against the counts of Mark, so that Waltrop became a part of Vest Recklinghausen.

The production of coal in the mine started in 1905. As a consequence, Waltrop grew larger and became an industrial town. One coal mine was closed down in 1979, the other closed in 1992.

In 1939, Waltrop got its municipal rights.

== Population ==
Historical population

Year	Pop.	±% p.a.
1965	23,968	—
1970	25,743	+1.44%
1975	26,833	+0.83%
1980	27,029	+0.15%
1985	27,394	+0.27%
1990	29,354	+1.39%
1995	30,466	+0.75%

Year	Pop.	±% p.a.
2000	30,406	−0.04%
2005	30,099	−0.20%
2010	29,636	−0.31%
2015	29,354	−0.19%
2020	29,472	+0.08%
2025	29,125	−0.24%

Source: Landesdatabank Nordrhein-Westfalen

== Governance ==
The town council of Waltrop consists of 36 seats, which are divided into 6 parliamentary groups since September 2020:

- SPD, 13 seats
- CDU, 12 seats
- Greens, 5 seats
- Waltroper Aufbruch (WA), 3 seats
- FDP, 2 seats
- Die Linke, 1 seat

Since 2020 Marcel Mittelbach (SPD) is mayor of Waltrop.

== Notable places ==
Waltrop is home to a museum of old ship lifts, including the Henrichenburg boat lift and a historical coal mine, called Zeche Waltrop.

== Local industry ==
- Manufactum, upscale retailer for traditionally-made household goods
- Langendorf, a tipping trailer manufacturer

== Notable people ==
- Sylvia Dördelmann (born 1970), rower
- Christoph Korte (born 1965), rower
- Michel Lewandowski (1914–1990), footballer
- Alexander Baumjohann (born 1987), footballer
- Nikolas Breuckmann (born 1988), mathematical physicist

== Twin towns – sister cities ==
Waltrop is twinned with:

- Herne Bay, United Kingdom (1976)
- Cesson-Sévigné, France (1984)
- San Miguelito, Nicaragua (1988)
- Gardelegen, Germany (1990)
- Görele, Turkey (2012)
