= Biebergemünd =

- Municipality
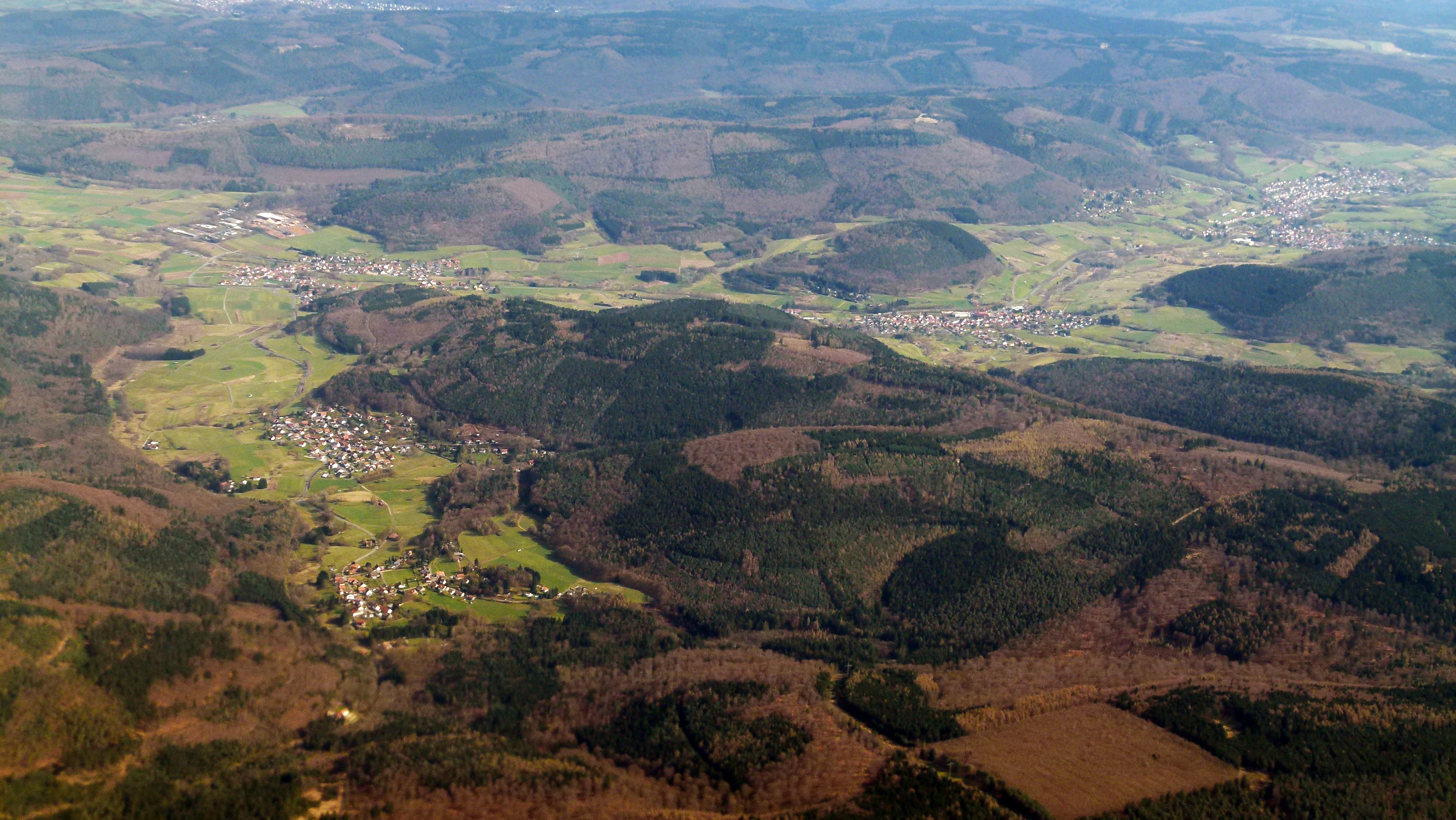
- The southern part of the municipality, seen from the southwest

- Coat of arms

- Location of Biebergemünd within Main-Kinzig-Kreis district
- Interactive map of Biebergemünd
- Location within Germany Location within Hesse
- Coordinates: 50°12′25″N 9°16′47″E
- Country: Germany
- State: Hesse
- Admin. region: Darmstadt
- District: Main-Kinzig-Kreis
- Subdivisions: 6 Ortsteile

Government
  - Mayor (2021–27): Matthias Schmitt

Area
  - Total: 78.45 km^{2} (30.29 sq mi)
- Elevation: 135–200 m (443–656 ft)

Population (2025-12-31)
  - Total: 8,187
  - Density: 104.4/km^{2} (270.3/sq mi)
- Time zone: UTC+01:00 (CET)
  - Summer (DST): UTC+02:00 (CEST)
- Postal codes: 63599
- Dialling codes: 06050
- Vehicle registration: MKK
- Website: www.biebergemuend.de

Biebergemünd (German pronunciation: [ˈbiːbɐɡəˌmʏnt]) is a municipality in the Main-Kinzig district, in Hesse, Germany. It has a population of over 8,000 and lies in the wooded hills of the Spessart.

== Etymology ==
The name derives from the River Bieber, which flows (mündet) into the Kinzig at Wirtheim.

== Geography ==
=== Location ===
Biebergemünd is mostly located in the Hessian part of the Spessart at elevations between 140 and 250 metres above NHN. Around 70% of the municipal territory is covered by forest. In the north, the municipality extends into the valley of the Kinzig river.

=== Neighbouring communities ===
The municipality's territory borders on the state of Bavaria in the south. The neighbouring communities are (from the north, clockwise): Wächtersbach, Bad Orb, Jossgrund, Flörsbachtal, Wiesener Forst, Geiselbacher Forst and Huckelheimer Wald (three wooded gemeindefreie Gebiete, Bavaria), Kleinkahl (Bavaria), Linsengericht and Gelnhausen.

=== Subdivisions ===
A map of the constituent communities

Villages that belong to Biebergemünd, (population numbers for 2013):

- Bieber (2,228)
- Breitenborn/Lützel (400)
- Kassel (2,464)
- Lanzingen (632)
- Roßbach (755)
- Wirtheim (1,911).

== History ==
Pre-historic hillforts were located on several hills in the area. Those on the hills Burgberg (Bieber), Alteburg (Kassel) and Hainkeller (Lützel) are attributed to the Celts, or more specifically to the late Hallstatt and early La Tène cultures, circa 540 to 340 BC. Although the reason for this concentration of Iron Age settlements in this area is not known, it may be associated with the presence of ores and mining activities (see below).

The area is mentioned quite early in documentary sources: in 886 the settlement Hegersfeld (Wirtheim) makes an appearance, followed by Wirtheim and Kassel in a gift by Otto II in 976. Although Bieber is a very old settlement, it only appears in written documents in 1339 (as the seat of a court of the Archbishop of Mainz administered by the Counts of Rieneck). Originally a poor village of foresters, its fortunes improved with the establishment of mines (first mentioned in 1494). Silver, copper, lead and (later) cobalt, nickel, bismuth and iron were mined in the area. Originally the Mainz authorities conducted the mining jointly with the Lords of Hanau, but after 1546 Mainz left Hanau in charge. The local mining industry peaked in the 18th century under the family von Cancrin. In 1925, the mines were closed.

In 1736, Bieber fell to the Landgraviate of Hesse-Darmstadt along with the County of Hanau. It came to the Kingdom of Prussia in 1866.

A local narrow-gauge track was built in 1885 to transport ore from the mines to the Kinzig valley at Gelnhausen. It covered a distance of around 23 km and was known as the Spessartbahn. After 1895 the trains also transported passengers. The last passenger service was discontinued in 1951.

The current municipality was created in the 1970s as part of the Gebietsreform in three steps: In 1970, Wirtheim and Kassel merged to become "Biebergemünd". In 1971, Bieber, Roßbach, Lanzingen, Breitenborn and Lützel merged to become "Bieber". Finally, in 1974 Biebergemünd and Bieber merged to become the Großgemeinde Biebergemünd.

== Economy ==
Biebergemünd is located on the Deutsche Ferienroute Alpen–Ostsee, a marked scenic route for tourists.

The largest single private employer is Engelbert Strauss GmbH & Co. KG (founded in 1948), a manufacturer of workwear. Its number of employees has almost quadrupled from 300 ten years ago. Its annual turnover is in the "500 million to 1 billion euro" bracket.

== Arts and culture ==
=== Points of interest ===
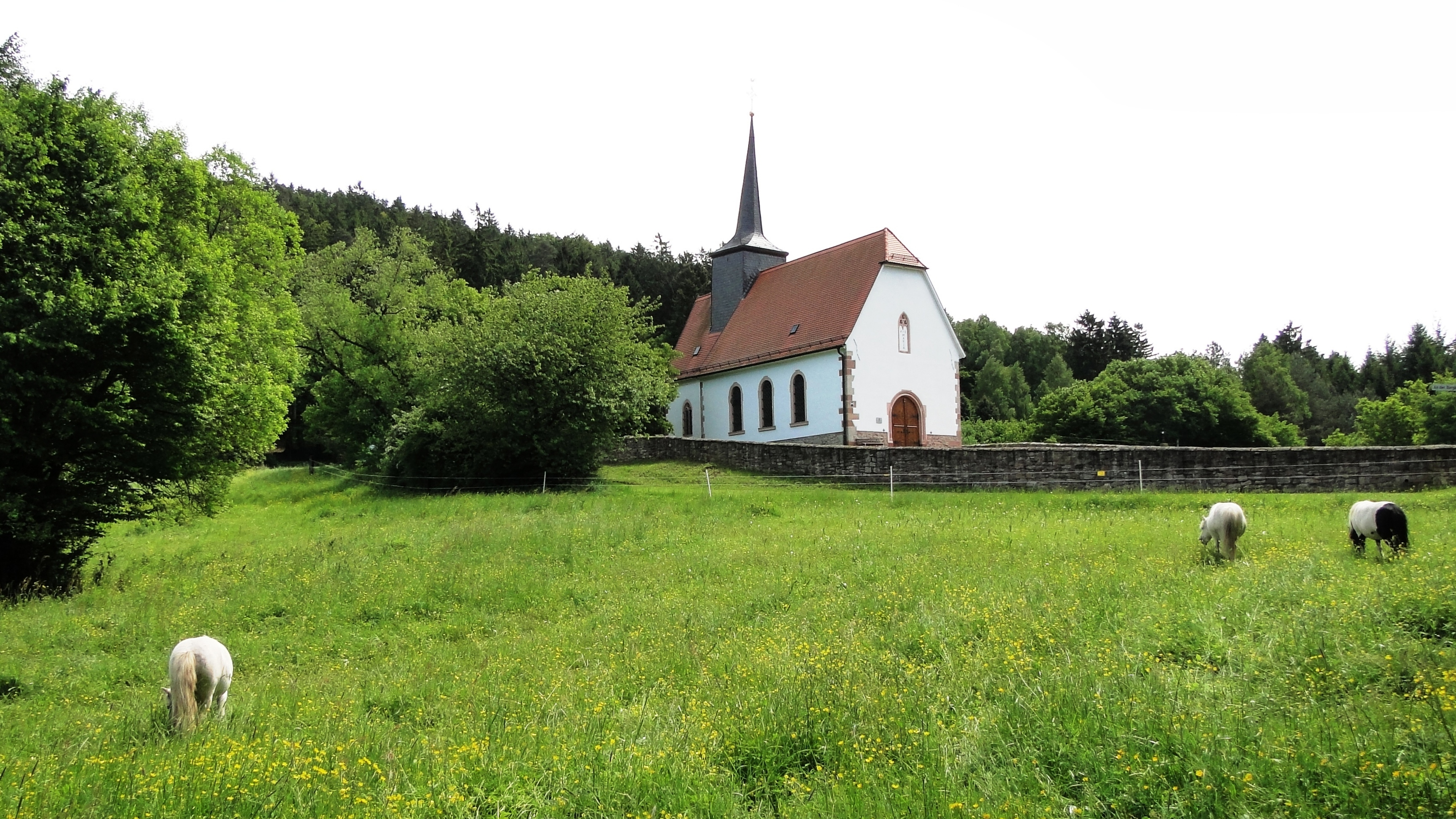
Burgbergkapelle St. Mauritius (Bieber)

The small Biebergrundmuseum in Bieber, opened in 2000, showed exhibits on local history. It closed on 3 May 2015, however. No date for reopening has yet been scheduled.

Two signposted hiking trails, part of the European project Europäische Kulturlandschaft Spessart which point out cultural highlights and explain the ways in which human habitation has changed the landscape, are located in the municipality. The first focuses on the mining history of the area. The second highlights the Celtic presence at Kassel (at the prehistoric settlement known today as Alteburg).

The Alteburg is roughly 3 km east of Kassel. Its hill-top fortification covers an area of 5.1 hectares, with ramparts of up to 6 m height, surrounded by a moat. Access was by three gates. It mostly dates to the early Middle Ages, but made use of an earlier, Celtic hillfort. Radiocarbon dating has put the foundations in the range of 540 to 340 BC. The upper layers likely date from 705 to 905 AD.

The Burgberg, ca. 2 km from Bieber, also features traces of pre-historic walls and ramparts. More prominent are the remains of early medieval walls of up to 5 m height with a moat 5 to 7 m wide and up to 1.5 m deep. The fortification covers an area of 4.9 hectares and when in use had two gates.

The third circular rampart is found on the Hainkeller, above the Lützelbach valley. It is a double ring fort that likely served as a local centre in the 4th and 3rd century BC. The distance between the inner and outer rampart averages 30 m. The inner circle covers an area of 2.4 hectares.

The Gothic parish church of Bieber was rebuilt in the 17th and 18th centuries and features a notable pulpit from 1797.

The Burgbergkapelle St. Mauritius (chapel) on the Burgberg near Bieber dates to the 14th and 15th centuries. The interior is Baroque. The chapel stands close to the remains of a circular rampart, likely built in prehistoric times.

Few traces remains of the historic mining activities near Bieber. The forest has covered the previously largely treeless hills around the Lochborn. Since in early modern times mines usually had ceiling heights of just 50 centimetres, children or people suffering from stunted growth were often used as miners ("dwarves"). Bieber is one of the towns that may have inspired the legends about "dwarves" which served as the source of the fairy tale of Snow White, as written down by the Brothers Grimm, who grew up in nearby Steinau an der Strasse. Thus Bieber marks the endpoint of the Schneewittchenweg hiking trail that crosses the Spessart from Lohr am Main.

In the south, Biebergemünd borders on the nature preserve of the Wiesbüttmoor, a rare hanging bog, and the Wiesbüttsee, an artificial lake created for mining operations in the 18th century.

== Government ==
The mayor of Biebergemünd is Matthias Schmitt, elected in 2021.

== Infrastructure ==
=== Transport ===
Wirtheim is located on the Bundesautobahn 66 between Hanau and Fulda. Bundesstrasse 276 crosses the municipality from northwest to southeast.

There is a railway stop at Wirtheim on the line connecting Hanau to Fulda. The narrow-gauge Spessartbahn from Gelnhausen to the former mining area at Lochborn (southeast of Bieber) was discontinued in 1951.

=== Utilities ===
There are highly controversial plans to build several large wind farms in the municipality. If implemented, a total of around 50 wind turbines of 200 metres height would be erected in prominent positions on hills around Biebergemünd. Environmentalists and many locals reject these plans due to the destruction of forests and animal habitats, possible health risks to residents and a threat to local property values and, in particular, to the tourism business as a result of a declining attractiveness of the region to visitors.

== Education ==
Biebergemünd has four kindergartens, 3 Grundschulen and one Haupt- und Realschule (see Education in Germany).
