= Grattan plc =

British clothing retailer

Grattan Plc
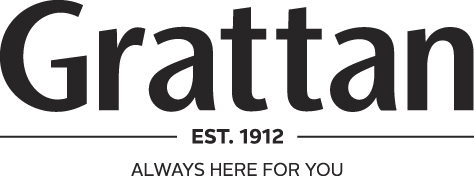
- Company type: Clothing
- Industry: Clothing catalogue
- Founded: 1912 as Grattan Stores; 1995 as Grattan Plc
- Founder: John Enrico Fattorini
- Headquarters: Bradford, UK
- Area served: UK, Ireland
- Key people: Ann Steer (CEO)
- Products: Clothing and household
- Owner: Otto Group
- Website: http://www.grattan.co.uk/

Grattan is an English catalogue clothing retailer based in Bradford, England with 18 stores and 2 main catalogues and a number of specialty catalogues. Grattan has approximately 2,600 employees.

== History ==
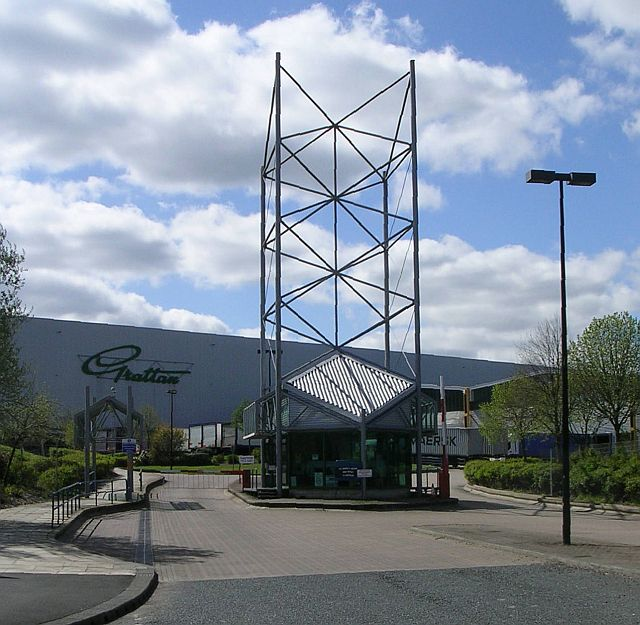
Grattan headquarters in Bradford.

Grattan catalogues was founded in 1912 by John Enrico Fattorini, in Bradford, West Yorkshire after he fell out with his cousin while working at Empire Stores.

The company was purchased by Next plc for 300 million pounds in 1986, a deal which saw Next outbid future Grattan owners Otto Versand. By the 1990s Grattan was the UK's fourth largest catalogue company with 13% of the mail order market.

In 1991 Grattan was purchased by Otto Versand for 165 million pounds. In 2000 its administrative department was merged with Freemans, under the banner of Otto UK.

Grattan's celebrity campaigns have included the model Penny Lancaster-Stewart and the TV presenter Nicky Hambleton-Jones.

In May 2009 the company announced plans to cut over 1000 jobs at their bases in Bradford, Sheffield, Peterborough and London in an effort to streamline the company and return the Freemans Grattan Holdings company back to profitability.

In 2012 Grattan announced plans to open a new head office in Bradford.

== Sponsorship ==
The Bradford-based catalogue company sponsored Bradford City A.F.C. from 1989 to 1991. From 2006 to 2010, Odsal Stadium in Odsal, West Yorkshire, England, was named Grattan Stadium for sponsorship reasons.
