= EOS CCA =

American customer care provider

CCA
- Company type: Private
- Industry: Debt collection
- Founded: Norwell, Massachusetts, U.S. (1991)
- Founder: Paul E. Leary, Sr.
- Headquarters: Norwell, Massachusetts, U.S.
- Number of locations: 6 Centers
- Area served: U.S.
- Key people: Paul E. Leary, Sr. (Founder); Paul Leary, JR. (CEO)
- Services: Debt collection Accounts receivable
- Number of employees: Approx 500
- Parent: EOS Group
- Subsidiaries: AffordaCare; CA Service Bureau; EOS ACA; EOS RRI; EOS CCA Rochester; True North AR; U.S. Asset Management
- Website: eos-cca.com
- Footnotes / references Data as of November, 2010

EOS CCA is a provider of debt collection services located in Norwell, Massachusetts. EOS CCA is the U.S. Receivables Management Division of the international EOS Group based in Hamburg, Germany.

== History ==
Paul E. Leary Sr. founded Collecto, Inc. d/b/a Collection Company of America in 1991. In 2006, Collecto, Inc. started doing business as CCA. In 2001, CCA joined the EOS Group of Hamburg, Germany. On October 5, 2009, Collecto, Inc., d/b/a CCA, and its six affiliated companies changed their d/b/a to EOS CCA.

In 2001, EOS CCA became the U.S. arm of the EOS Group, a worldwide accounts receivables collection and financial services provider. CCA was renamed EOS CCA in 2009.

== Business ==
EOS USA is one of America's largest debt collection firms. The company provides a variety of debt recovery and collection services, including credit bureau reporting, scoring services, and analytics.

EOS USA is a division of the EOS Group, one of Europe's largest ARO organizations. EOS USA consists of EOS USA, EOS Healthcare and EOS CCA. Headquartered in Norwell, Massachusetts, EOS USA has four additional regional offices in California, Illinois, Kentucky and Texas.

As of December 2016, EOS CCA employs approximately 500 people in the United States.

EOS CCA is headquartered just outside Boston at 700 Longwater Dr Norwell, Massachusetts 02061 with regional centers across the United States. EOS USA has four additional regional offices in California, Illinois, Kentucky and Texas.
