= Michel Lewandowski =

Footballer (1914–1990)

Personal information
- Birth name: Mieczyslaus Lewandowski
- Date of birth: 28 May 1914
- Place of birth: Waltrop, Kingdom of Prussia
- Date of death: 7 September 1990 (aged 76)
- Place of death: Lens, France
- Position: Midfielder

Youth career
- Pogon-Marles

Senior career*
Years	Team	Apps	(Gls)
1935–1938	Béthune		
1938–1945	Lens		
1945–1950	Roubaix-Tourcoing		
- JA Armentières

International career
- France Military

Managerial career
- US Billy-Berclau
- AS Lens
- * Club domestic league appearances and goals

Michel Lewandowski (born Mieczyslaus Lewandowski; 28 May 1914 – 7 September 1990) was a professional footballer who played as a midfielder. Born in the Kingdom of Prussia, he played his entire career in France and was a French military international.

== Playing career ==
Mieczyslaus Lewandowski was born in Waltrop in the Kingdom of Prussia, German Empire. He was of Polish descent. Having first played for Pogon-Marles and Béthune, Lewandowski was discovered by Lens in 1938, where he became professional. He played eleven matches for Lens in the 1938–39 Division 1. In 1945, he signed for Roubaix-Tourcoing. He won the 1946–47 Division 1 with the club before leaving in 1950, signing for JA Armentières that year.

Naturalized on 23 February 1939, Lewandowski was selected for the France military national team.

== Managerial career ==
After his retiring from football, Lewandowski went on to coach US Billy-Berclau and AS Lens.

== Honours ==
Roubaix-Tourcoing

- Division 1: 1946–47
