= EuroShop =

Retail trade fair in Düsseldorf, Germany

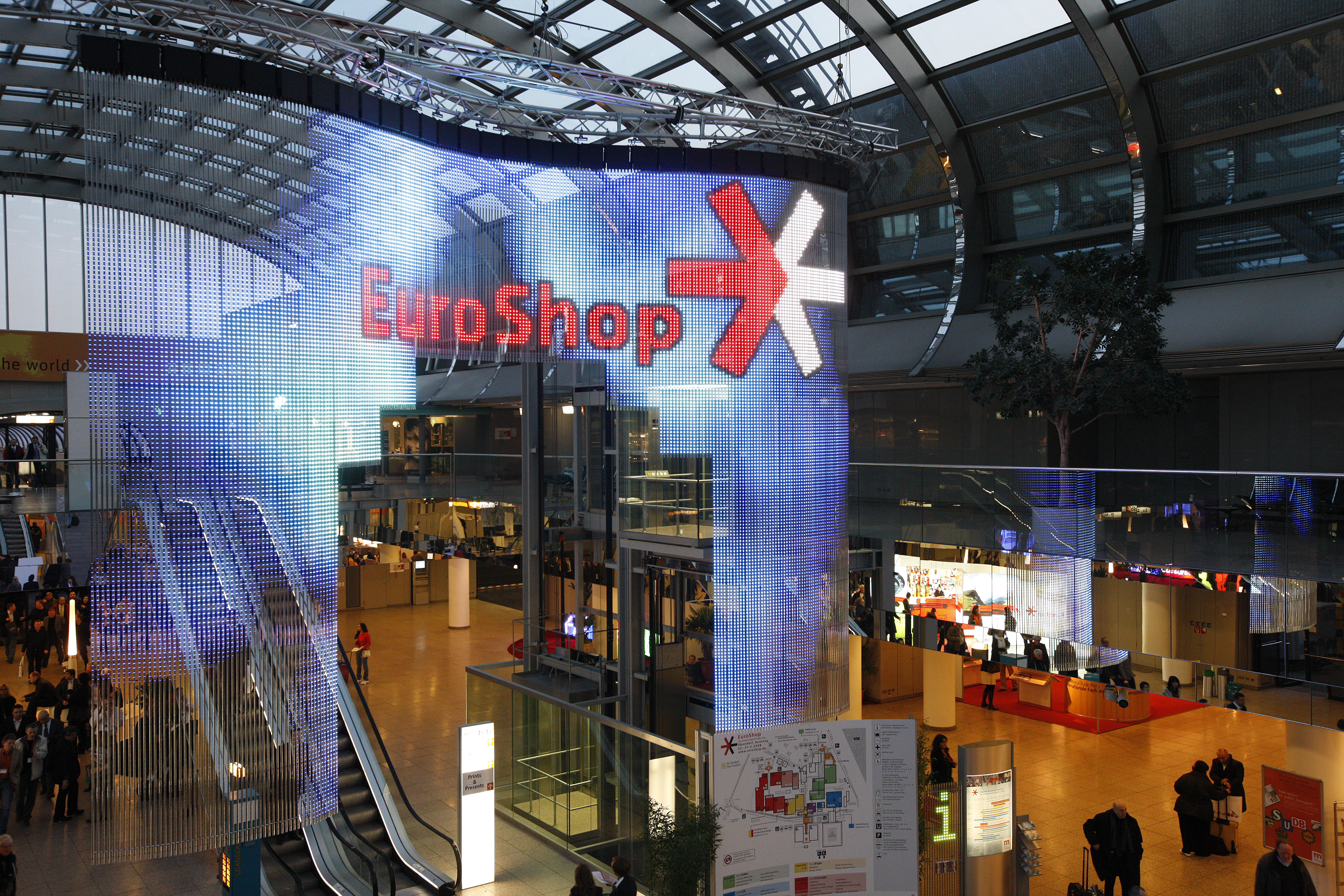
EuroShop 2008

EuroShop is a trade fair for retail capital goods, held at the Messe Düsseldorf exhibition grounds in Düsseldorf, Germany. It has been held since 1966, every two years until 1972 and every three years since 1975. Messe Düsseldorf organises the fair in cooperation with the EHI Retail Institute. Admission is restricted to trade visitors.

== History ==
The fair was founded in response to changes in European retailing during the 1960s, when self-service formats and the first discount stores increased demand for shopfitting and merchandise presentation. Messe Düsseldorf and the EHI Retail Institute, then named Institut für Selbstbedienung, agreed to establish it in 1965. The first edition ran from 11 to 15 June 1966 at the former exhibition grounds at the Ehrenhof.

Shopfitting, window dressing and shelving dominated the early editions; display advertising, lighting and stand construction followed up to the 1990s. As information technology gained ground, Messe Düsseldorf added a separate event between EuroShop editions, the "Technology Forum 97", first held in October 1997. It was renamed "Retail Technology" in 2000 and, when EuroShop was restructured in 2002, took the name EuroCIS from the fair's technology segment. In EuroShop years EuroCIS forms one of the fair's sections; in other years it is staged separately.

The 2002 restructuring divided EuroShop into four areas: EuroConcept, EuroSales, EuroExpo and EuroCIS. This arrangement lasted until 2014. For the 2017 edition the organiser replaced it with seven areas it called "experience dimensions"; their number, scope and names have changed several times since.

== Format ==
At the 2026 edition the exhibits were grouped into seven dimensions: shopfitting and store design, lighting, refrigeration and energy management, expo and event marketing, retail technology, retail marketing, and food service equipment. The emphasis has shifted over time from shopfitting towards technology and energy. Visitors come mainly from retailing and wholesaling, architecture, store planning, design and marketing.

Awards presented at the fair include the reta awards (retail technology awards europe), the EuroShop RetailDesign Award, the EXHIBITOR Mag EuroShop Award and a science award.

== Editions outside Germany ==
Messe Düsseldorf has run related events abroad since the 2010s. C-star in Shanghai was the first, later trading as China In-store; the company also organises In-store Asia in Mumbai. A first EuroShop Middle East is scheduled for 25–27 October 2027 in Dubai, postponed from October 2026.

== Facts and figures ==
The 2026 edition ran from 22 to 26 February across 14 halls, with 1,840 exhibitors from 61 countries and more than 81,000 trade visitors from 141 countries. AUMA, the German trade fair industry association, records 80,146 visitors and 102,856 m^{2} of net exhibition space. The next edition is scheduled for 18–22 February 2029.

Year	Exhibitors	Visitors	Exhibition space in m^{2}
1966	331	28,762	19,614
1968	387	28,419	25,249
1970	454	40,582	33,164
1972	478	41,393	39,198
1975	522	40,710	37,867
1978	560	45,514	40,701
1981	597	45,742	41,966
1984	760	61,202	43,896
1987	943	80,541	60,888
1990	1,120	100,640	79,842
1993	1,473	91,436	95,430
1996	1,508	100,967	90,856
1999	1,587	92,377	96,524
2002	1,595	92,532	98,907
2005	1,652	90,963	94,843
2008	1,895	104,766	106,871
2011	2,036	107,273	107,971
2014	2,229	109,496	116,579
2017	2,369	113,906	127,592
2020	2,292	94,339	123,799
2023	1,824	81,484	102,927
2026	1,840	80,146	102,856
