= Crate & Barrel =

International home decor company

Euromarket Designs, Inc.
- Trade name: Crate & Barrel
- Type: Private; Subsidiary
- Industry: Retail
- Founded: December 7, 1962; Chicago, Illinois, U.S.
- Founders: Gordon Segal; Carole Segal
- Headquarters: Northbrook, Illinois, U.S.
- Number of locations: 75 Crate & Barrel stores / 16 Crate & Barrel outlets / 31 Crate & Barrel warehouses / 26 CB2 stores / 1 CB2 outlet / 10 Hudson Grace stores (2022)
- Area served: United States; Canada; Mexico; Colombia; Costa Rica; Peru; Philippines; Singapore; Taiwan; United Arab Emirates; Saudi Arabia
- Key people: Sergio Bucher, Chairman of the Board (2020–present) Janet Hayes, CEO (2020–present)
- Products: Housewares, furniture, and home accessories
- Revenue: US$2.5 billion (est.)
- Owner: Otto Group (1998–present)
- Number of employees: 7,500
- Website: crateandbarrel.com

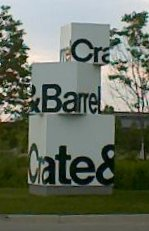
Crate & Barrel headquarters

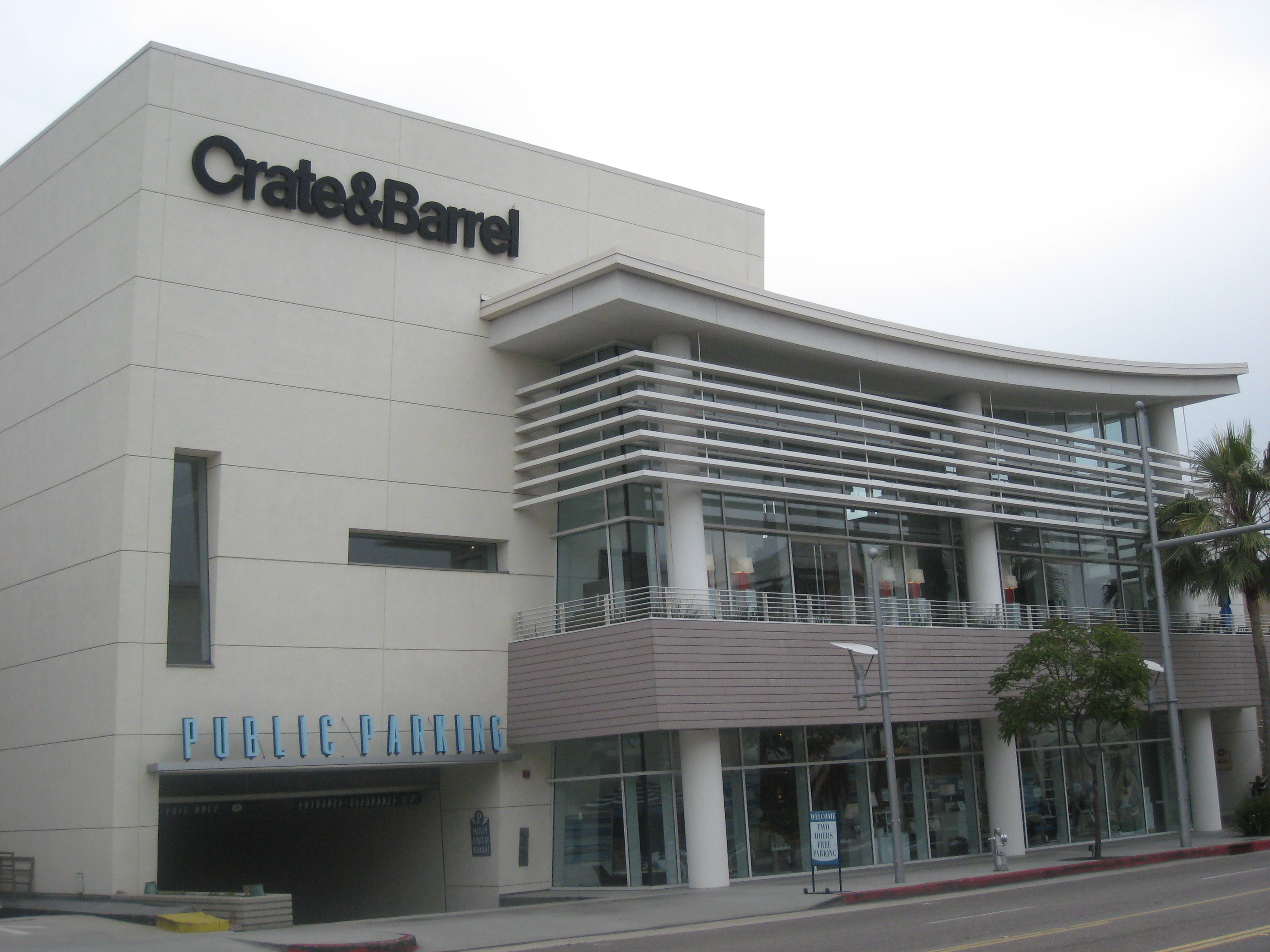
Crate & Barrel store on Beverly Drive in Beverly Hills, California

Euromarket Designs Inc., doing business as Crate & Barrel (stylized as Crate&Barrel), is an international furniture and home décor retail store headquartered in Northbrook, Illinois. They employ 8200 employees across over 100 stores in the United States and Canada, with franchises in Central America, South America, Asia and United Arab Emirates.

== History ==
=== Founding ===
Gordon and Carole Segal opened the first Crate & Barrel store on December 7, 1962, at age 23. The 1,700-square-foot (160 m^{2}) space in part of an old elevator factory was located at 1516 North Wells Street in the then-bohemian Old Town neighborhood of Chicago, Illinois; for a brief period, it was managed by Harrison Ford. The inspiration was their honeymoon in the Caribbean, where the Segals saw inexpensive yet tasteful European household products for sale. They became interested in providing functional and aesthetically pleasing products to young couples just starting out. Surprised to see that European manufacturers offered many beautiful and durable products at reasonable prices, they were inspired to start their own store in the United States. The Segals started by recruiting an employee and leasing an abandoned elevator factory on Chicago's Wells Street. They traveled throughout Europe buying directly from glassblowers, ceramicists and factories making French copper pots and simple white bistro dinnerware.

The first store opened in response to a flourishing of world trade in home furnishings in the early 1960s, round of talks about the General Agreement on Tariffs and Trade. The Segals sought out small European companies that were not represented in America and negotiated direct purchases from these factories that could be sold to the consumer while avoiding a wholesaler's markup. To this day, a majority of Crate & Barrel's products are direct imports from Europe, though Thai, Mexican and Indian glass and textiles can also be found in their stores.

The Segals derived the company name by the materials that they originally used to display items in their Chicago store. A friend suggested they call their company "Barrel and Crate", but Carole thought they should reverse the order of the words. They turned over the crates and barrels that the merchandise came in, let the wood excelsior spill out, and stacked up the china and glass. This helped emphasize their strongest selling point — that their products were direct imports.

In 1966, Segal and the designer Lon Habkirk visited the Design Research store in Cambridge, Massachusetts, which had an "enormous influence" on their retailing approach. Habkirk later remarked, "Eventually we took the whole idea and translated it into a reproducible formula."

=== Growth ===
In 1968, the Segals opened their second store in the Plaza del Lago shopping center in suburban Wilmette, Illinois, and third in Oak Brook, Illinois in 1971. Its first store outside the Chicago area opened in Chestnut Hill, Massachusetts in 1977. In 1979, it opened its second Cambridge, Massachusetts, store in the building designed for the recently closed Design Research, which they had so admired; that store closed in 2009.

By 1985, the chain had grown to 17 stores, and has continued to grow. In March 1995, it opened its first New York location (its 59th location), in Manhattan. After selling a majority stake to German mail order company the Otto Group in 1998, Otto became the sole owner in 2011. By 2002, it had grown to approximately 100 locations, and over 135 locations by late 2004.

Crate & Barrel's flagship store, located in Chicago on Michigan Avenue in the "Magnificent Mile", closed in January 2018. The building became the world's largest Starbucks coffee roastery and retail space. Today, there are 93 Crate & Barrel Stores in the United States and Canada, including 10 outlets.

In 2019, Crate & Barrel partnered with the Cornerstone Restaurant Group to open The Table at Crate, a full-service restaurant at the Crate & Barrel Oak Brook store in Oakbrook, IL. It also acquired Hudson Grace, a boutique home décor, entertaining and gift brand based in San Francisco. Crate and Barrel plans to grow the Hudson Grace brand through retail expansion into niche markets and an invigorated online presence to engage new and existing customers across channels.

=== International expansion ===
Crate & Barrel Holdings has 22 stores in Canada, Colombia, Costa Rica, Mexico, Peru, Philippines, Singapore, Taiwan and United Arab Emirates. In September 2008, Crate & Barrel opened its first location outside the United States, at Yorkdale Shopping Centre in Toronto, Ontario, Canada. A new two-story 35,000-square-foot (3,300 m^{2}) building, similar to other newly opened stores in the U.S., was constructed. A second Canadian store in Calgary opened in October 2009. A third Canadian store opened in Mississauga, Ontario, on October 28, 2010, at Square One Shopping Centre. Additional stores opened in 2011 in Edmonton, Alberta at Southgate Centre, another in Spring 2012 at Carrefour Laval Shopping Centre in Laval, Quebec, and another in Oakridge Centre mall in Vancouver, British Columbia, in early 2013. Future international expansion in Canada and possibly other countries is also reportedly planned.

In the fall of 2009, the company reported plans to open two stores in Dubai in 2010 via a franchise agreement with Al Tayer Group.

Crate & Barrel opened its first Asian store in Singapore in January 2013, occupying two floors at Ion Orchard.

Crate & Barrel has three stores in Taiwan, one is in Taipei and the other in Taoyuan and Taichung.

Crate & Barrel opened its first store in Peru in 2015, and opened its first store in Colombia in December 2016 in Bogota- Parque La Colina Mall, via a franchise agreement with Falabella (retail store).

In July 2017, Crate & Barrel opened its first store in Central America in Escazú, Costa Rica, inside Avenida Escazú mall.

=== Management ===
Barbara Turf, first hired in 1968, succeeded Gordon Segal as CEO of the company in May 2008. In November 2008, it was reported that sales for the prior year for the chain were $1.3 billion. Turf retired in 2012. Sascha Bopp was named to replace her. Sascha Bopp departed August 2014. While a replacement was sought, Otto Group asked Segal to return as a consultant.

Doug Diemoz, formerly with competitors Restoration Hardware and Williams Sonoma, became CEO of Crate & Barrel on August 1, 2015. Doug Diemoz departed April 2017. It was announced Neela Montgomery would assume his role.

Neela Montgomery, former member of the executive board with the Otto Group, led the company as CEO until August 2020, ending six-years with the Otto Group.

Sergio Bucher became Chairman of the Board of Crate & Barrel Holdings in February 2020 at a time when the Crate & Barrel brand had lost part of its design appeal. This led to a change at the helm of the company with the departure of Neela Montgomery and the arrival of Janet Hayes.

Janet Hayes became the CEO of Crate & Barrel Holdings on August 1, 2020, after a long tenure at WSI, where she was President of Pottery Bark Kids, then President of the William Sonoma brand .

The cooperation between Bucher and Hayes led to an unprecedented growth of the company and a return to its Scandinavian design heritage, including the opening of a new celebrated flagship store in New York City.

== Products ==
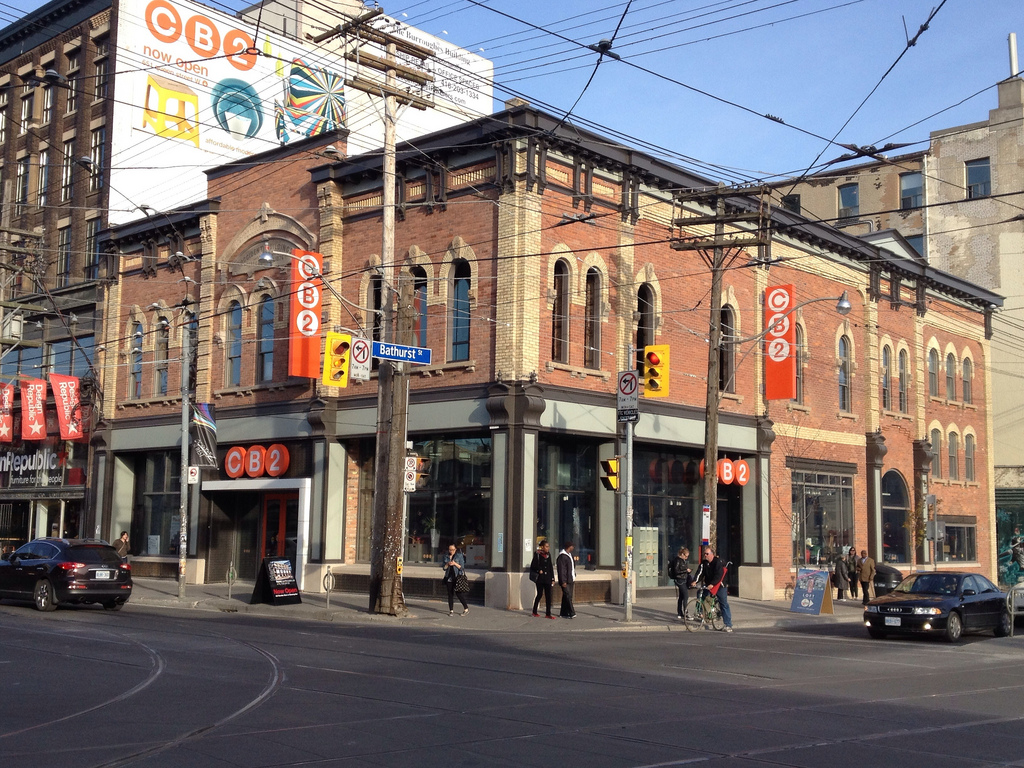
CB2 in Toronto

Crate & Barrel offers a variety of "upmarket" housewares, furniture, and related merchandise. These are displayed in the "vignette" style, where items are grouped together as they might appear in the home. The company was an innovator of this style, which has since become more widely used.

== Sister stores ==
Crate & Barrel has two sister brands. CB2 is a home furnishings division geared toward young adults created in 2000. The brand now has 25 stores across the U.S. and Canada. An additional store was planned to open in Denver in 2018.

Crate & Barrel's kids brand, The Land of Nod, acquired in 2001, closed all stores by the end of Spring 2018. On March 7, 2018, Crate & Barrel launched Crate & Kids, a kids furnishings, home goods and gifts product offering launching online and in 38 stores.

In 2019, Crate & Barrel announced its acquisition of Hudson Grace, a boutique home décor, entertaining and gift brand based in San Francisco and in 10 stores.

== Legal issues ==
Biometric privacy settlement

In 2024, Crate & Barrel agreed to a $2.4 million settlement resolving a class-action lawsuit alleging violations of the Illinois Biometric Information Privacy Act (BIPA). The suit claimed the company required employees in Illinois to scan their fingerprints for timekeeping without obtaining written consent or providing disclosures as required under the statute. A county judge approved the settlement, which established a fund to compensate class members without the company admitting liability.

ZIP Code class actions

Crate & Barrel has faced multiple class action lawsuits related to retail practices, including actions alleging that the retailer unlawfully collected customers' ZIP Code during credit card transactions. These lawsuits were preliminarily resolved in the early 2010s through settlements that provided merchandise certificates and credits to class members.

Trade secrets litigation In 2017, Restoration Hardware Inc. filed a lawsuit against Crate & Barrel and former executives who had left RH to work at Crate & Barrel, alleging misappropriation of trade secrets and breach of contractual obligations. The suit contended that confidential information pertaining to business strategies and operations was improperly taken to benefit the rival retailer. The case was later dropped.
