= Cotton made in Africa =

Project initiative launched and managed by the Aid by Trade Foundation

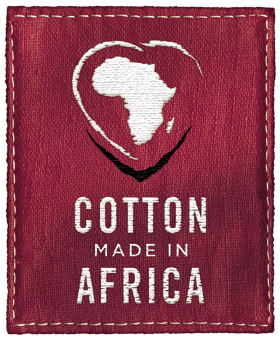
- Formation: 2005; 21 years ago
- Founder: Dr. Michael Otto
- Type: Project initiative
- Purpose: To improve living conditions of African smallholder cotton farmers
- Headquarters: Hamburg, Germany
- Coordinates: 53.5583221°N 10.0090019°E
- Parent organization: Aid by Trade Foundation
- Website: cottonmadeinafrica.org

Cotton made in Africa ("CmiA") is a project initiative launched and managed by the Aid by Trade Foundation (AbTF), headquartered in Hamburg, Germany. AbTF was founded in 2005 by Dr. Michael Otto, the Hamburg business entrepreneur and Chairman of Otto Group. Cotton marketed under the badge is produced according to strict criteria for environmental, economic, and social sustainability.

== Development work in Africa ==
=== Core principles ===
"Helping people to help themselves" is a core CmiA principle. The smallholder farmers receive on-site training in improved cultivation methods which allow them to increase their crop yields, generate higher income and thus raise their standard of living through their own efforts. CmiA plans to finance training over the long term through financial contributions from participating cotton trading companies, as well as through levying CmiA licence fees. Strictly speaking, CmiA is not organic cotton but places a strong emphasis on reducing the use of pesticides. However, pesticides listed under the Stockholm Convention are banned, as non-degradable or partially degradable organic toxins, so-called POPs.

=== Countries ===
CmiA Project countries include the West African states of Benin and Burkina Faso apart from Zambia - and more recently, Mozambique (April 2008 onwards). These four countries are amongst the poorest on the planet. The CmiA Project reaches around 130,000 smallholder farmers in these regions and their efforts produce ~85,000 tonnes of raw CmiA cotton from a cultivation area of ~160.000 hectares.

=== Training ===
During their on-site training, the African smallholder farmers learn about efficient methods of cultivation and best practices to conserve precious resources, thereby increasing their crop yield and quality. This qualification approach is aimed at helping the smallholder farmers find their way out of the poverty trap in the long term, through ownership-driven practices that contribute to a significant improvement in the farmers’ income. Initial studies show that the Project has benefitted the countries: in Zambia, for instance, the crop yields of some groups of farmers have more than doubled, while in Benin the quality of the cotton has been substantially improved after only two planting seasons.

=== Strategic alliance ===
In its detailed implementation of the Project, the Foundation works closely with its partners and specialists on site in the Project areas. Besides the German Federal Ministry for Economic Cooperation and Development (BMZ), CmiA is also supported by the Bill & Melinda Gates Foundation, while the DEG, GTZ as well as the cotton traders Dunavant, ICA Talon and Faso Coton also participate in the Project. Further stakeholders supporting CmiA in an advisory capacity are Accenture, Avery Dennison, German Agro Action, German Nature and Biodiversity Conservation Union (NABU), McCann Erickson and the World Wide Fund For Nature. With the signature of a partnership agreement in December 2008 between the DEG and the Bill & Melinda Gates Foundation for the support of the cotton sector in sub-saharan Africa, CmiA gained a further valuable partner and sponsor to help finance the roll-out of the Project to other West African countries.

=== Verification ===
In-field cotton production, transport, ginning and storage of the raw cotton are all evaluated within the framework of an independent verification process based on a filter and traffic-light system. The structure and content of the CmiA verification system was prepared by the Dutch University of Wageningen and subsequently further developed by the consultancy PriceWaterhouseCoopers, in close co-operation with central Aid by Trade Foundation stakeholders. The core of the verification system contains a filter based on a series of exclusion criteria, as well as a group of sustainability indicators. The exclusion criteria include the most abusive forms of child labour, slavery, forced labour and infringement of freedom of association (union membership). The sustainability indicators include soil and water protection practices such as crop rotation and soil re-fertilisation as well as the responsible use of pesticides.

== Marketing ==
=== Concept ===
As a pragmatic, market-orientated approach, the economic feasibility of Cotton made in Africa is not dependent on charity but on activating market forces. This means that expenses such as premium payments to the farmers, which ultimately add to the cost of the raw product, do not arise. CmiA-produced raw cotton is traded at market prices; in this regard the AbTF does not act as a cotton trader but rather as Project developer and holds the marketing rights to CmiA. As distribution partners, the members of the Demand Alliance pay a licence fee which is then reinvested in the Project countries.

=== Demand Alliance ===
CmiA targets the mass market for cotton goods, and the Demand Alliance of international textile companies is a decisive factor in the Project initiative’s success. These companies take up CmiA cotton for the production of their own goods and through this demand create a pull effect which runs right along the textile chain to reach the smallholder farmers in Africa. Demand Alliance members include Anson's, Celio, Otto Group, Peek & Cloppenburg, PUMA, QVC, Tchibo, Tom Tailor, s.Oliver and 1888 Mills, LLC.

=== Quality Seal ===
Cotton made in Africa is used in the fashion and home textiles segments and all articles using CmiA are distinguished by a red label. CmiA is an ingredient brand: this means that it is not a product brand, but rather a brand for African cotton which is used as a raw material in branded products. CmiA thus defines itself as a Quality Seal and appears besides an already existing brand. It is also applied by branded product suppliers as an ‘extra quality mark’ to distinguish and differentiate their respective product.

=== Consumer trends ===
A 2008 survey of German consumers, commissioned by Accenture and carried out by market research institute Forsa, confirms the validity of the business model and development approach of initiatives such as Fairtrade or CmiA and organic products. Results show that 85 percent of German consumers are willing to pay more for clothing that can be proven to have been produced under environmentally sustainable and ethical working conditions. According to the survey, the significance of the topic of sustainability in consumer behaviour is also growing: a quarter of consumers surveyed stated they were willing to pay over 20 percent more for clothing produced under sustainable conditions, although one in three responders stated they planned to reduce their clothing expenditure. A clear consequence of these developments is that companies which ignore the trend towards sustainability are very likely to lose customers. 77 percent of Germans stated that they would buy less or even no products from their preferred supplier, if it could not prove that these had been produced under sustainable conditions. However, demand for standard-compliant cotton comes mainly from Europe and North America. Opportunities for expanding sustainable cotton consumption are likely to come from emerging economies.
