= The Land of Nod (company) =

- Type: Private
- Industry: Retail (specialty)
- Founded: 1996 in Highland Park, Illinois
- Headquarters: Northbrook, IL
- Key people: Janet Hayes, CEO (present)
- Products: Furniture, bedding, toys, gifts, and room accessories for children
- Website: www.crateandbarrel.com/kids

The Land of Nod was a catalog, internet, and retail store company, based in Northbrook, Illinois, specializing in children's furniture, bedding, and accessories.

Scott Eirinberg and Jamie Cohen launched the company in 1996 out of Eirinberg's basement in the Chicago suburbs. In 2000, The Land of Nod formed an equity partnership with Crate & Barrel to help expand their presence in the United States market. In 2010, Eirinberg left the company and in February 2011, Cohen left the company.

Land of Nod, which had been owned by Crate & Barrel since 2001, closed all its stores in February 2018 and transitioned to an online-only model, with a section on Crate & Barrel's website stylized as Crate&BarrelKids
