= Tony Rampton (businessman) =

British businessman (1915–1993)

Tony Rampton OBE
- Born: Anthony Rampton; 24 October 1915; Kingston upon Thames, Surrey, England
- Died: 30 December 1993 (aged 78); London, England
- Education: Harrow School
- Alma mater: The Queen's College, Oxford
- Occupations: Businessman and philanthropist
- Spouse(s): Joan Shanks (m. 1939–1993); his death
- Children: Four, including Richard Rampton

Anthony Rampton OBE (1915–1993) was a British businessman and philanthropist, and chairman of the clothing retailer Freemans from 1965 to 1984.

== Early life and education ==
Rampton was born on 24 October 1915 in Kingston upon Thames, Surrey, England. He attended Harrow School (where it was said that he could throw a cricket ball further than any other pupil before or since) and read law at The Queen's College, Oxford.

== Career ==
In 1938, he joined the Freemans catalogue and online retail company which his grandfather had co-founded in 1906. After service in the Royal Berkshire Regiment in World War II, notably in India, he rejoined the company and served as its Managing Director (1964–1965), Chairman (1965–1984) and President (1984–1988). Under his leadership the company computerised, expanded, and built a large warehouse facility in Peterborough. In 1963 Freemans became a public company and Rampton received an unexpectedly large sum of money, much of which he and his wife gave to found the Hilden Charitable Fund, which aims "to address disadvantages, notably by supporting causes which are less likely to raise funds from public subscriptions" both in the UK and elsewhere.

He also worked in the areas of race relations and the adoption of children. He and his wife Joan set up the Standing Conference for Societies Registered for Adoption, which eventually became the British Association for Adoption and Fostering (BAAF).

In 1979, he was appointed by the then-Labour government to chair the government's Committee of Inquiry into the Education of Children from Ethnic Minority Groups, but the 1981 interim report "blamed, among other things, low teacher expectations and the racial prejudices of both white teachers and society at large". This was a politically unpopular finding, and was unacceptable to the now-Conservative government: Rampton was dismissed as chair to be replaced by Lord Swann. The committee's 1984 report Education for All came to the same conclusion.

In 1974, he established and personally funded the Freemans Trust, now the Tony Rampton Trust, which helps present or former employees of Freemans who are in need and also supports charities for which present or former employees volunteer or fund-raise.

== Personal life ==
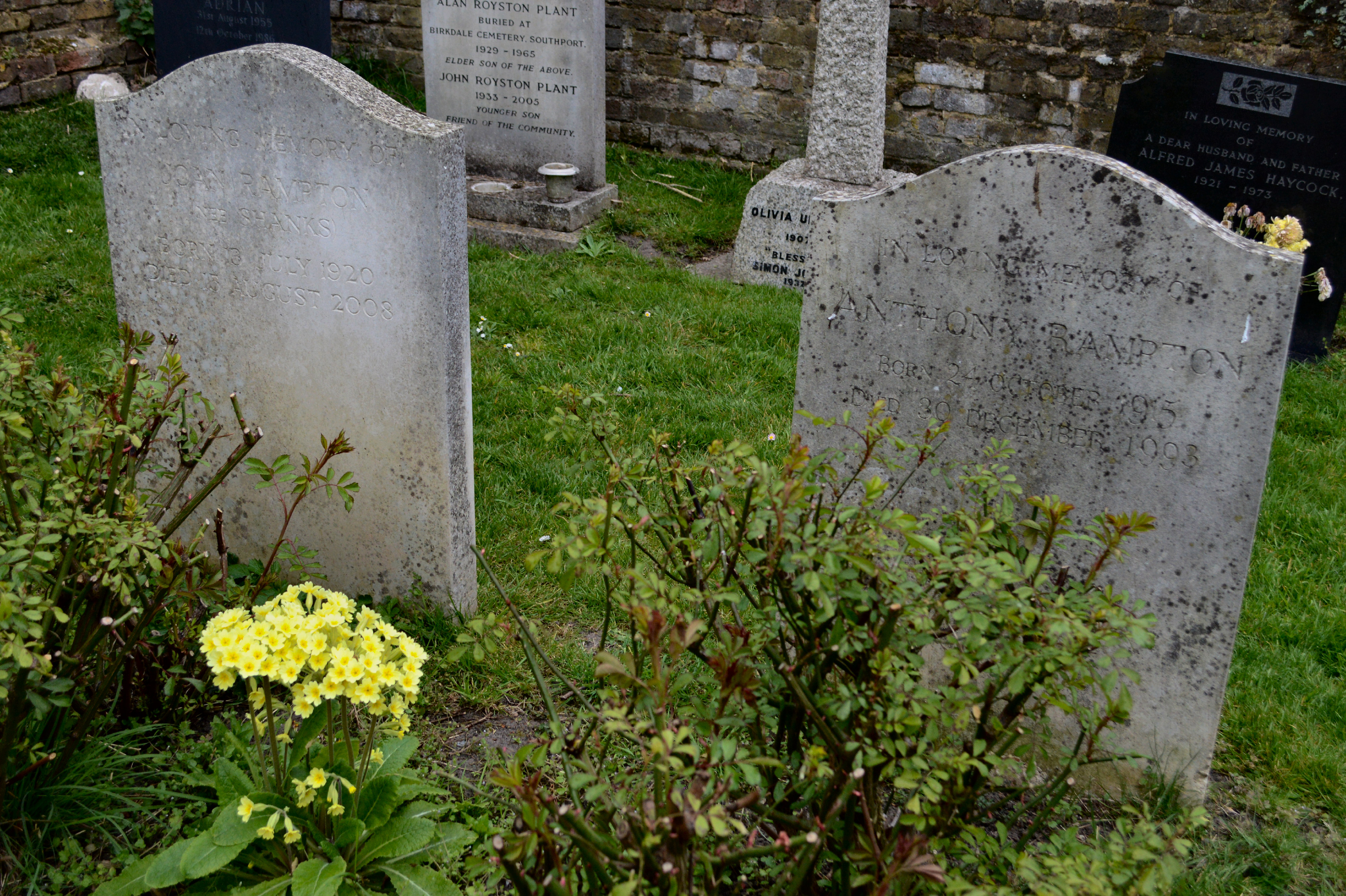
Graves of Tony and Joan Rampton at St Peter's Church, Petersham

In 1939, he married Joan Shanks. They lived at Gort Lodge, an early 18th-century Grade II listed house in Petersham, which was then in Surrey and is now in the London Borough of Richmond upon Thames, and had three sons, Richard, David and Ben, and a daughter, Elisabeth (Lizzie).

Rampton was also a very accomplished and largely self-taught amateur artist. Over the course of 30 years, he produced 350 paintings, including portraits, landscapes inspired by views of the Thames and of the Isle of Arran in Scotland where he and his family spent the summer months, and many pictures of buildings. He never exhibited during his lifetime but a retrospective exhibition of his work, opened by Michael Young, Baron Young of Dartington, was held at Orleans House Gallery in Twickenham, London in 1997.

He died in London on 30 December 1993, survived by his wife and children. His wife, Joan, died on 15 August 2008. They are buried at St Peter's Church, Petersham.
