= Manufactum =

German department store chain

Manufactum GmbH
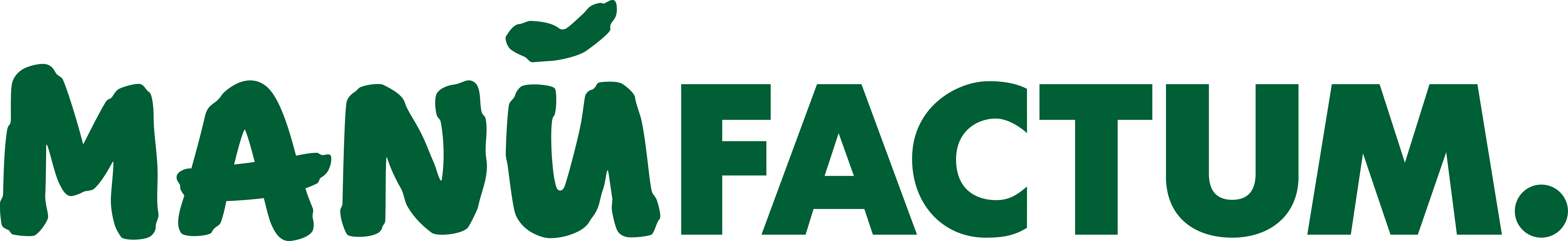
- Company type: Private
- Industry: Retail
- Founded: 1987
- Founder: Thomas Hoof
- Headquarters: Waltrop, Germany
- Key people: Alexander Peters (CEO); Kai Steffan (CEO); Maximilian Kleinert (CEO)
- Products: Household and garden goods, appliances, clothing, footwear, furniture, beauty products, tools, and electronics
- Revenue: ▲€ 75 million (2007)
- Number of employees: about 700
- Parent: Otto GmbH
- Website: manufactum.com

Manufactum GmbH (formerly Manufactum Hoof & Partner KG) is a German retailer with 14 full-sized stores in Germany and an online store that serves the majority of European Union member states. The company also sells cosmetics, apparel and shoes, computers, bikes, foodstuffs, books, bed and bath accessories, and furniture.

== History ==
Manufactum was founded in 1987 by Thomas Hoof, former managing director of the German Green Party in North Rhine-Westphalia. In 2008, Heine Versand, a wholly owned subsidiary of Otto GmbH, took over Manufactum. In 2007, Manufactum had 400 employees and annual sales of 75 million EUR.

Stores are currently located in Hamburg, Bremen, Berlin, Waltrop, Düsseldorf, Cologne, Bonn, Frankfurt, Freiburg, Münster, Stuttgart, Vienna, and Munich.

There is criticism that the typical high-priced Manufactum products are quite elitist and that Manufactum does not like to disclose it is benefiting from globalization because some of its products are made in Asia.

The brands "Manufactum Brot & Butter" (groceries; own stores in several German cities) and "Gutes aus Klöstern" (monastic products), the restaurant "Gasthaus Lohnhalle", and the designer furniture brand "Magazin" (with stores in Stuttgart, Bonn, Cologne and Munich) also belong to the Manufactum group.
