= Otto Group =

German multinational e-commerce company

Coordinates: 53°36′3.17″N 10°4′21.12″E

Otto GmbH & Co. KGaA
- Formerly: Werner Otto Versandhandel; Otto Versand
- Type: Private
- Industry: Retail, e-commerce
- Genre: Mail order
- Founded: 17 August 1949
- Founder: Werner Otto
- Headquarters: Hamburg, Germany
- Area served: Europe, United States of America, Canada, Asia
- Key people: Alexander Birken (Chairman of the Supervisory Board); Petra Scharner-Wolff (CEO and Chairman of the Executive Board)
- Revenue: €16.2 billion (2023)
- Owner: Michael Otto Foundation
- Number of employees: 41,186 (2023)
- Subsidiaries: Crate & Barrel, Bonprix
- Website: www.ottogroup.com/en

The Otto Group (Otto GmbH & Co. KGaA) is a German retail company based in Hamburg that operates companies worldwide in the retail, e-commerce, financing, logistics and mail order sectors. In 2023, the Group generated sales of €16.2 billion and had around 41,186 employees.

== History ==
In August 1949, Werner Otto founded the company Werner Otto Versandhandel (Otto Versand) in Hamburg. In 1950, the first catalogue with a print run of 300 copies was published, presenting 28 pairs of shoes on 14 hand-bound pages. The following year, the first printed catalogue comprised 28 pages and offered an extended product range, which subsequently further diversified in the 1950s and included, among others, porcelain, bicycles, and electrical appliances. After further expansion, Otto Versand moved into a 205,000-square meter building in 1960. The number of employees increased to 2,000.

In 1969, the Hanseatic Bank was founded, through which customers could finance their orders. At the same time, the Werner Otto Foundation was established in Hamburg to promote medical research. When postal strikes and higher rates posed a threat to operations in 1972, the delivery service Hermes Versand was established. In 1980, Otto Reisen GmbH was founded, marking the company's entry into the tourism industry.

In 1981, Michael Otto, son of the founder, took over the company. Throughout the following years, the Otto Group continued its expansion into Spain, Italy, Great Britain and other markets. By 1987, the Otto Group was considered the leading mail order company worldwide. After the fall of the Berlin Wall in 1989, sales also rose in Eastern Europe.

The 24-hour express service was introduced in 1990 and Otto Group launched an online shopping website in 1995. The catalogue, previously only available as a printed version, was published digitally on the internet for the first time in 1997.

Otto Group entered the US market in 1998 by acquiring a stake in the Chicago-based furniture store Crate & Barrel.

The two Austrian brands of the Otto Group, Universal and Otto, were bundled into Unito Versand & Dienstleistungen in 2003, and the mail order business in Germany was renamed Otto GmbH & Co KG. In 2005, the Otto Group sold 75% of the shares in Hanseatic Bank to Société Générale.

In 2009, the Otto Group secured the rights to the Quelle brand and numerous retail brands such as Privileg in a bidding process. Later, in 2012, the Neckermann brand was acquired. In 2014 the online fashion retailer About You was founded.

In the 2015/2016 financial year, over 90% of mail order sales were generated online, making the Otto Group the second-largest German online retailer behind Amazon, according to a study by the EHI Retail Institute.

The last printed edition of the Otto main catalogue was published in December 2018, as around 95% of all orders were received digitally by this point.

In 2023, the Otto Group entered into cooperations with Covariant and Boston Dynamics.

In December 2024, the Otto Group announced the sale of its 64.7% majority stake in About You to Zalando for approximately €1.13 billion (€6.50 per share). The transaction included the B2B platform Scayle. Following regulatory approval, the deal closed in July 2025.

== Corporate affairs ==
The key trends of the Otto Group are (as at the financial year ending February 28):

| Year | Revenue (€ bn) | Net income (€ m) |
|---|---|---|
| 2017 | 12.5 | 41 |
| 2018 | 13.7 | 516 |
| 2019 | 13.6 | 177 |
| 2020 | 14.3 | 214 |
| 2021 | 15.6 | 971 |
| 2022 | 16.1 | 1,814 |
| 2023 | 16.2 | –413 |
| 2024 | 15.0 | –426 |

== Corporate structure ==
The shares in the Group of Michael Otto and his son, Benjamin Otto, have been combined in a foundation since 2016.

The Group operates over 100 companies internationally, primarily in Germany, Europe, and the United States. The activities of the Otto Group's business include e-commerce, over-the-counter retail, and catalogue sales channels. In the 2023 financial year, the Otto Group generated revenue of €16.2 billion, of which around €12 billion was generated online, making the Otto Group one of the largest online retailers in the world. The following is an extract of some subsidiaries:

=== Platforms, brands, and retailers ===
- OTTO
- About You (Sold to Zalando in December 2024)
- Bonprix
- Crate & Barrel
- Heine
- Küche & Co
- Sheego
- Venus
- Witt
- Baur Retail
- Hanseatic
- Frankonia
- Freemans Grattan
- Limango
- Manufactum
- Unito

=== Services ===
- Baur Logistics
- Hermes Europe
- Girard Agediss
- Hermes Einrichtungs Service
- Hermes Fulfilment
- Hermes Germany
- Otto International
- EOS Group
- Hanseatic Bank
- Otto payments

== Sustainability ==
Activities concerning sustainability are the responsibility of the executive board. These activities relate to both ecological and economic sustainability, which were anchored in the Otto Group's corporate objectives in 1986. The Otto Group pursues a partnership with Save the Children, among others.

In 2005, the Aid by Trade Foundation was created, which originated the initiative Cotton made in Africa. The cotton sourced from growers of the Cotton made in Africa initiative is used by the Otto Group and other textile companies such as ASOS and S.Oliver.

== Criticism ==
In 2016, the UK branch of Hermes was criticized by The Guardian for paying its suppliers less than the minimum wage. Hermes couriers were self-employed and were paid based on the parcels delivered. Hermes was again criticized by a major newspaper in 2021, when an article in The Times published allegations about the mishandling of packages and bad customer service.

== Literature ==
- Brock, Christian; Streubig, Andreas (2014). "Nachhaltigkeitsmanagement am Beispiel der Otto Group – Herausforderungen, Strategie und Umsetzung". In Kenning, Peter; Kirchgeorg, Manfred (eds.). Sustainable Marketing Management (in German). Wiesbaden: Springer Fachmedien Wiesbaden. pp. 339–357. doi:10.1007/978-3-658-02437-6_17. ISBN 978-3-658-02436-9.
- Joseph, Ugesh A. (9 March 2016). The 'Made in Germany' Champion Brands. Routledge. pp. 35–37. ISBN 978-1-317-02503-0.
