= Freemans =

British online clothing retailer

Freemans plc
- Type: Plc
- Industry: Clothing retail catalogue
- Founded: 1905
- Founders: A.C. Rampton, W.E. Jones, S.C. Rampton and H.A. Freeman
- Headquarters: Bradford, England, United Kingdom
- Key people: Ann Steer (CEO)
- Products: Clothing
- Parent: Otto Group
- Website: freemans.com

Freemans is a British online and catalogue multi-channel retailer headquartered in Bradford, England. Freemans offers a range of products, predominantly clothing, footwear and homewares.

== History ==
The company was founded as Freemans & Co in 1905 by four partners, A.C. Rampton, W.E. Jones, S.C. Rampton and H.A. Freeman and began life with only twelve staff out of a terraced house based in Clapham, south London. Each member put up £100 as capital to get the business going, equivalent to £10,513 in 2025.

Freemans specialised in selling clothing items and distributed its catalogue each month throughout the United Kingdom. The initial catalogues were made up of black and white illustrations that reflected the available products. Of the product range the "made to measure" suits were a success, offering a cheap tailored opportunity for customers at the time, costing only 30 shillings, equivalent to £158 in 2025. The company used agency representatives in local areas as a form of credit control and to manage sales, with most goods being sold on credit. Women, however, were restricted by law as they could not negotiate credit arrangements and required a husband's signature to purchase goods. Therefore, the majority of agents were men.

A year after it was founded, the newly named Freemans of London moved to larger premises at 215 Lavender Hill, Wandsworth. Company staff are affectionately nicknamed "The Lavender Hill Mob", some 45 years prior to the famous British film of the same name being made.

In 1914 the company was forced to direct its efforts towards the war effort and, ceasing expansion plans, focus on buying blankets and selling them to the Government and the armed forces.

The 1920s saw the introduction of colour photographs in the Freemans catalogues and the company continued to expand, with 200 people being employed by 1922. This led to another move, into a converted cinema that was formerly known as "the Gem", but saw the company remain in the Lavender Hill area of London.

Freemans grew to dominate the mail order landscape in the 1930s, being the largest mail order company in the UK, with over 30,000 agents. Expansion also meant that the company needed to find larger premises; it moved to 139 Clapham Road, London, in 1937.

By 1937 Freemans had expanded its product line to include important labour-saving household service items such as vacuum cleaners and washing machines. Now in new offices, it also became a privately held company.

Being situated so close to London had unfortunate consequences during the Second World War as the Clapham offices were bombed, killing 23 members of staff and destroying all company records. However, the company continued to trade, now limited to a much smaller range of products due to the scarcity of suppliers and more essential use of raw materials. In fact the catalogue featured only clothing items, but these could now be purchased using the newly introduced coupon rate system. By the end of the war as rationing had taken full effect, clothing coupons were the only way to pay for clothes.

Despite the staff count reducing to less than 300 by 1945, the 1950s was a period of boom for the mail order industry. New levels of disposable income as part of a "post-war" boom led to increased levels of consumerism and Freemans capitalised on this by producing a fully colourised 1000-page catalogue that was distributed by mail and featured a much wider range of products. The credit proposition was also giving Freemans a USP that wasn't available on the high street, and was also perhaps the primary reason catalogue shops such as Grattan, Littlewoods and Empire Stores did so well during this period.

In 1963 Freemans PLC was floated on the stock market as it became a public limited company, and it installed its very first computer, being the first mail order company to do so. This was just one example of how Freemans built a name as the most pioneering mail order company in the UK, followed by the introduction of telephone ordering.

In early 1992 Freemans bought the loss-making Dutch mail order company Ter Meulen Post, the former mail order arm of the Rotterdam department store chain Ter Meulen, from Vendex International. The takeover cost 320 of the business's 440 jobs. After a loss of 9 million guilders in 1992, Ter Meulen Post was wound down, and on 1 October 1993 its activities were taken over by the German Klingel group.

Looking further afield, Freemans opened a new international division, with the aim to break into the worldwide marketplace. The venture eventually made Freemans one of the 140 recipients of the Queens Award for Export Achievement in 1995.

In 1969 the company required more warehouse space and opened an automated distribution centre in Peterborough, England. It became the first company to post goods in plastic packaging and was also the first UK company to generate heat from waste packaging.

Once again Freemans looked at an innovative way to progress its business as it introduced a telephone ordering service for its agents. This was further developed five years later as a telephone system was introduced to deal with both customer and agent queries.

Tony Rampton, grandson of one of the founders, served Freemans as Managing Director (1964–1965), Chairman (1965–1984) and President (1984–1988).

== Sears PLC ==
In 1988 Freemans was purchased by Sears PLC, whose other investments included bookmakers William Hill and the controlling arm of Selfridges, turning it into one of the country's largest retail organisations. It also meant that Freemans could now easily source and stock popular high street brands and promote them in its catalogue.

== Innovation ==
In 1994 the Freemans range was produced and distributed on a CD. This was an innovative stage at a time for a business which over the past century had relied heavily on its catalogue consisting of paper. The idea won many awards for creativity and ingenuity, but was subsequently superseded by the presence of an online catalogue in the form of a company e-commerce website which was created in 1997. By then, Sears had sold Freemans, leaving it an independent company once again.

In 1997 Littlewoods plc attempted to take over Freemans but the move was blocked by the Monopolies and Mergers Commission of the Board of Trade. However, within two years the company had attracted the attention of German mail order giant Otto Versand, which had already entered the UK market with the purchase of established mail order name Grattan in 1991.

Initially, Freemans operations remained in London, but it was quickly integrated with the Bradford-based Grattan, not only utilising its head office at Anchor House, Ingleby Road, Bradford, but also warehousing in Peterborough and Bradford and a call centre in Sheffield.

In 2005 Freemans revamped its website. This was the first in a number of moves to react to the increasing online business. By 2008 the brand logo had changed from Freemans to Freemans.com to reflect the doubling in online sales over the previous two years.

A year later Freemans was presented an award by More magazine for "Most Aspirational Mail Order Catalogue" and by Prima magazine for "Best Mail Order Brand", a title it retained the following year.

The parent company, now renamed Otto UK, announced a restructure of the UK-based business in 2009, bringing all its home shopping brands together under the brand Freemans Grattans Holdings (FGH) and utilising the popularity of the Freemans name in the UK.

To this day, customers must order online before receiving catalogues or brochures by post; these are no longer available on request.

== Sponsorship and celebrity endorsement ==
Freemans embraced the concept of celebrity endorsement and elicited the help of one of the world's first international supermodels, Twiggy, to promote the brand in the 1960s.

Pop icon Lulu began modelling for the Freemans catalogue in the 1970s and early 1980s as the brand looked to capture a boutique atmosphere but within the catalogue format. Lulu's brightness and bounce were the selling points for its young fashion. At the same time the catalogue offered Lulu the chance to promote her exclusive fashion range produced by Lenbry Fashions.

The 1970s also saw star of the BBC sitcom Butterflies, Wendy Craig, model for the catalogue company.

In the early 1980s, model and actress Lorraine Chase promoted the "Lorraine Chase Collection" through the Freemans catalogue. It also gave supermodel Yasmin Le Bon one of her first major modelling campaigns in the 1980s.

TV presenter Des Lynam was chosen to promote the catalogue company's leisurewear in the early 1990s, securing a five-year deal. From 2007 to 2009, television and West End star Denise Van Outen promoted the catalogue's new "One Collection".

Other celebrities associated with the brand include British swimmer and Olympic silver medallist Sharron Davies and Liverpool-born TV presenter Keith Chegwin.

Freemans were shirt sponsors for local football team Bradford City AFC from 1991 to 1993; the shirt was made by Bukta in Bradford City's traditional claret and amber colours for the home shirt and a plain white for the away strip.

The company also sponsored the Celebrity Mum of the Year Award in 2006, an award which was won by Sharon Osbourne.

== In popular culture ==
The Clapham Road home of Freemans of London is featured on themed tours of London as one of the top industry-related places to visit in London.

Alan Davies cited the Freemans catalogue in one of the jokes at his 2012 Edinburgh stand-up show, highlighting how renowned the catalogue's history remains amongst the mainstream population.
