= EHI Retail Institute =

German research and educational institute for the retail industry

The EHI Retail Institute e. V. (EHI) is a research and educational institute for the retail industry and its partners based in Cologne, Germany. The EHI is supported by retail companies and trade associations and sponsored by manufacturers of consumer and capital goods. The EHI network has around 770 members worldwide. In addition, the EHI is the founder and conceptual partner of EuroShop, an international trade fair for retail investment goods.

== History ==
The EHI as it is known today emerged as the German Retail Institute (DHI) in 1989 from the merger of the former retail institutes ISB (Institute for Self-Service and Retail Management, founded in 1957) and RGH (Rationalisation Association of the Retail Trade, founded in 1951). In 1993, the institute was renamed EHI (EuroHandelsinstitut), and in 2006, EHI Retail Institute.

In 1967, the RGH created the basis for uniform item numbering (BAN), the predecessor of the EAN numbers. The BAN-L centre within RGH, founded in 1969, became the Centrale für Coorganisation in 1974, which has been called GS1 Germany since 2005. EHI has a 50% stake in GS1 Germany.

Since 1999, the association has been certifying online shops with the EHI seal of quality. Internet retailers that are allowed to use the EHI seal of quality meet standards of respectability, data protection and data security and undergo an annual review.

In 2001, Foodplus GmbH, in which EHI has a 100% stake, emerged from one of EHI's business units.

In February 2006, Götz W. Werner took over the presidency of EHI. Kurt Jox became his successor in 2018. Jox, who retired from his last position as CEO of Tessner Holding, was succeeded in November 2021 by Markus Tkotz, CEO of Markant AG, for a term of three years.

In 2018, the mobile payment initiative was founded together with various market players.

== Research priorities ==
- Trade structures
- Retail, real estate and expansion
- Technology
- Shop planning and shop fitting
- Logistics and packaging
- E-commerce
- Marketing/CRM
- Security
- Public relations
- Climate and Energy

== Awards ==
Since 2008, EHI and GS1 have been awarding the Science Award, worth a total of €40,000, for excellent scientific work and cooperation projects that are highly relevant for the retail industry and cooperation partners along the value chain. Since 2008, the institute has also been presenting the Retail Technology Awards (reta awards) for the best technology solutions in retail and the Retail Design Awards for the most convincing store concepts. The three prizes are awarded at the Euroshop trade fair.
