= Benjamin Otto =

German entrepreneur

- Born: June 9, 1975 (age 50); Hamburg, Germany
- Education: European Business School London
- Occupation: Businessman
- Known for: About You
- Spouse: Janina Lin Otto
- Parent(s): Michael Otto (father); Christl Otto (mother)
- Relatives: Werner Otto (grandfather); Katharina Otto-Bernstein (aunt); Frank Otto (uncle); Alexander Otto (uncle); Janina Özen-Otto (sister)
- Website: benjamin-otto.info

Benjamin Otto (born 9 June 1975) is a German entrepreneur and one of the founders of the online fashion retailer About You. He is a member of the Otto family, which operates the retail and services company Otto Group.

== Life ==
Otto was born on 9 June 1975 in Hamburg. His grandfather, Werner Otto (1909–2011), founded the mail-order company that later became the Otto Group. His father is entrepreneur Michael Otto (born 1943), who was chief executive officer of the Otto Group from 1981 to 2007 and subsequently chaired its supervisory board. Benjamin Otto grew up in Hamburg together with his sister Janina. After completing his Abitur in 1995, he undertook vocational training as a banker at Berenberg Bank. From 1998 to 2001, he studied business administration at the European Business School London.

Otto is married to Janina Lin Otto.

== Career ==
After completing his degree, Otto founded the technology company Intelligent House Solutions, which developed smart home technology products. The business later evolved into Evoreal Holding, a project development group. In early 2019, Otto sold his shares in the company to his business partner.

In 2013, Otto co-founded the start-up Collins together with Tarek Müller and Sebastian Betz; this venture would later become the German online fashion retailer About You. On 1 June 2015, Otto stepped down as chief executive officer of Collins and joined the Otto Group as an active shareholder within the family business.

Otto is also active in the start-up and venture capital sector. Through his company BPO Capital, he invests in early-stage digital business models, and he is an investor in the venture capital firm Revent Ventures, which finances start-ups in areas such as climate technology, educational technology, and e-health.

Together with his wife Janina Lin Otto, he founded the Holistic Foundation in 2018 and is the chair of the foundation board. In 2022, he co-founded the platform Holi.Social with his wife and Piet Mahler, which connects initiatives and organisations involved in voluntary work.

Otto is the vice chair of the foundation board of the Michael Otto Foundation, which represents the foundation as majority owner of the Otto Group. Since June 2015, he has also been vice chair of the shareholder's council, which defines and supervises the strategic direction of the company.

In March 2024, the Otto Group announced that the company's strategic leadership will be transferred from Michael Otto to Benjamin Otto by 2026. Benjamin Otto is scheduled to assume the chair of both the foundation board and the shareholder's council on 1 March 2026.
