= Film Manufacturers Inc. =

Film Manufacturers Inc. is a Film and TV production company with offices in New York City and Munich, Germany. Founded by filmmaker Katharina Otto-Bernstein, the production company develops, produces and co-produces fiction and non-fiction entertainment.

In 2006, FMI’s Absolute Wilson had its world premiere at the Berlin Film Festival; after a successful international festival run, it went on to win the Art Film of the Year award from Art Basel. In 2007, Absolute Wilson – The Biography was published by Prestel Publishing as a companion book.

Otto-Bernstein directed and produced Beautopia for FMI, which screened in competition at Sundance Film Festival in 1998 and won the Silver Hugo at the Chicago Film Festival the same year. FMI's other titles include The Need For Speed, Coming Home, When Night Falls Over Moscow, and The Second Greatest Story Ever Told.

Mapplethorpe: Look at the Pictures, produced by Otto-Bernstein for FMI, received its premiere at Sundance Film Festival in January 2016, followed by the International Premiere at the Berlin Film Festival in February, and a world television premiere on HBO in April. The film was released theatrically in the US and UK in April 2016, followed by the rest of the world. Mapplethorpe: Look at the Pictures was nominated for two Emmy Awards: Outstanding Documentary Or Nonfiction Special and Outstanding Cinematography For A Nonfiction Program.

In 2018, FMI executive-produced The Price of Everything, a documentary examining the role of art and artistic passion in today’s money driven, consumer-based society. The film had its world premiere at Sundance Film Festival, followed by a theatrical run, and a TV premiere on HBO.

In 2019, FMI was a co-producer on the Amazon Prime TV-Series Fur Umme, which is currently developing its second season.

In 2021, FMI produced the narrative feature Maalsund (starring Ulrich Tukur and Sibel Kekilli, Westdeutscher Rundfunk). Currently in pre-production are Heisenberg (directed by Uli Edel) and The Galapagos Affair (directed by Marc Rothemund).

In 2023, FMI produced Joyland. Initially banned in its home country, Pakistan, for its LGBTQ+ themes, the film premiered at the Cannes Film Festival in 2023 where it won the Un Certain Regard Jury Prize and Queer Palm. It was later Shortlisted as Best International Feature at the 96th Academy Awards and won the Independent Spirit Award for Best International Film in 2023.

In 2024, FMI executive produced Oh, Canada, which premiered at Cannes, and played at the New York Film Festival and Toronto International Film Festival.,

In 2025, FMI produced the documentary feature film "The Last Spy", a riveting biography of 102-year-old CIA spymaster Peter Sichel. The "fascinating" and "eye opening" film had its world premiere at the Munich Film Festival.

FMI was also an executive producer on Gus Van Sant's "Dead Man's Wire" which world premieres at the 82nd Venice International Film Festival and "A Sad and Beautiful World", which world premieres at Giornate Degli Autori.

== Films ==
- "Dead Man's Wire" (2025)
- "A Sad and Beautiful World" (2025)
- "The Last Spy" (2025)
- "When the Geese Flew" - Short film (2025)
- "Aria" - Short film (2025)
- "Kisses and Bullets" - Short film (2025)
- "Oh, Canada" (2024)
- "Crossing the river" - Short film (2024)
- "Obraza" - Short film (2024)
- "Out The Window Through THe Wall" - Short film (2024)
- "Children of Light" - Short film (2024)
- "Obsessed with light" (2023)
- "Joyland" (2023)
- "She Always Wins" - Short film (2023)
- "Maalsund", (2021)
- "Darling" - Short film (2019)
- "The Price of Everything" (2018)
- Mapplethorpe: Look at the Pictures (2016)
- Absolute Wilson (2006)
- Beautopia (1998)
- When Night Falls Over Moscow (1994)
- The Second Greatest Story Ever Told (1994)
- The Need For Speed (1993)

== TV Series ==
- Für Umme (2019)
