= Germany's Next Topmodel season 14 =

Germany's Next Topmodel
- Season 14
- Judges: Heidi Klum
- No. of contestants: 30
- Winner: Simone Kowalski
- No. of episodes: 16

Release
- Original network: ProSieben
- Original release: 7 February – 23 May 2019

Season chronology
- ← Previous; Season 13 Next → Season 15

The fourteenth season of Germany's Next Topmodel aired on German television network ProSieben from 7 February to 23 May 2019 under the catch phrase More Glam, More Stars, More Heidi.

Starting this season, there is no longer a permanent panel of judges. Thomas Hayo and Michael Michalsky did not return for their spots as judges, while the teams and battle concept were also removed. Both Hayo and Michalsky's places at judging remained open for guest judges each week. However, Hayo remains a recurring guest judge in the series. This format remains unchanged for all succeeding seasons. Notably, this is also the only season where guest judges have the opportunity to grant a wildcard for models who are in danger of elimination.

The winner of this season was 22-year-old Simone Kowalski from Stade. Her prizes included:

- A modeling contract with Günther Klum's OneEins GmbH Management worth €140,000.
- A cover and spread in the German edition of Harper's Bazaar.
- A cash prize worth €100,000.
- An advertising campaign for Michael Michalsky's parfum and Palmolive.

The international destinations this season were set in Sölden, Los Angeles, New York, Miami, Amsterdam and Paris.

== Contestants ==
(ages stated are at start of contest)

Contestant	Age	Hometown	Finish	Place
Anastasiya Baskakova	21	Stuttgart	Episode 2	30-27
Marlene Donner	19	Stuttgart	Episode 2	30-27
Debora do Nascimento Goulart	22	Berlin	Episode 2	30-27
Ann-Kathrin Grünewald	20	Haßfurt	Episode 2	30-27
Olivia Rhode	16	Munich	Episode 3	26 (quit)
Maria Willhauk	19	Heilbronn	Episode 3	25-22
Naomi Ufelle	16	Vienna, Austria	Episode 3	25-22
Celine Hamann	19	Malchow	Episode 3	25-22
Loriane Glocke	24	Munich	Episode 3	25-22
Kim Dammer	18	Oberhausen	Episode 4	21 (quit)
Joelle Pascai-Quednau	23	Mechernich	Episode 4	20-18
Melina Lucht	19	Duisburg	Episode 4	20-18
Catharina Maranca	19	Dortmund	Episode 4	20-18
Leonela Hires	19	Vienna, Austria	Episode 5	17
Luna Dzek Dukadjinac	21	Hann. Münden	Episode 6	16
Enisa Bukvic	24	Hamburg	Episode 7	15 (quit)
Jasmin Veit Cadete Rosado	18	Frankfurt	Episode 7	14 (DQ)
Melissa Hemberger	23	Rosenheim	Episode 8	13
Justine Klippenstein	20	Schloß Holte-Stukenbrock	Episode 9	12
Theresia Fischer	26	Hamburg	Episode 10	11
Julia Helm	23	Illertissen	Episode 11	10
Lena Lischewski	17	Essen	Episode 12	9
Tatjana Wiedemann	22	Leipzig	Episode 13	8
Sarah Almoril	20	Schlüchtern	Episode 14	7
Caroline Krüger	21	Bremerhaven	Episode 14	6
Alicija Köhler	18	Lehre	Episode 15	5
Vanessa Stanat	21	Bensheim	Episode 15	4 (quit)
Cäcilia Zimmer	18	Freiburg im Breisgau	Episode 16	3
Sayana Ranjan	20	Grevenbroich	Episode 16	2
Simone Kowalski	22	Stade	Episode 16	1

== Episode summaries ==
No. overall	No. in season	Title	Original release date
196	1	"Dinner mit Heidi"	7 February 2019
At the start of the new season, Heidi Klum met her Top 50 model contenders for a glittering dinner in Berlin. Then, she revealed that the girls have to walk in their first fashion show for designer Michael Michalsky. After the show, 30 girls got chosen.: Wildcard: Marlene Donner; Special guest: Lena Gercke
197	2	"Schneeköniginnen"	14 February 2019
Heidi Klum traveled with her 30 finalists to Sölden, Austria. Then, the girls had their first challenge. They had to compete in a shoot, in two teams and in sexy ski outfits against each other. Heidi choose Sayana and Tatjana to be the leader of their group. The prize was that the winning team would moving into a luxury hotel, whilst the losing team had to move in a rustic hut. The winning team was Tatjana's team. At the first main photo shoot with Kristian Schuller, the girls turned into radiant snow queens. And fashion designer Wolfgang Joop surprised the models with a professional runway teaching for the perfect appearance on the catwalk. At elimination, Catharina was eliminated but got a wildcard from Wolfgang and was saved. In the end, Anastasiya, Ann-Kathrin, Debora and Marlene were eliminated.: Challenge winner: Team Tatjana (Cäcilia Zimmer, Caroline Krüger, Celine Hamann, Julia Helm, Joelle Pascai-Quednau, Justine Klippenstein, Lena Lischewski, Leonela Hires, Loriane Glocke, Melissa Hemberger, Olivia Rhode, Sarah Almoril, Simone Kowalski, Tatjana Wiedemann & Theresia Fischer); Wildcard: Catharina Maranca; Eliminated: Anastasiya Baskakova, Ann-Kathrin Grünewald, Debora Goulart & Marlene Donner; Featured photographer: Kristian Schuller; Special guest: Wolfgang Joop
198	3	"Sexy-Edition"	21 February 2019
The new week started with a photoshoot. The girls had to pose as farm girls with Jordan Barrett. After the photoshoot, the girls had a catwalk training with Heidi. Then, the girls had to walk against each other in a challenge. Each one girl of the teams. The challenge has won by Team Sayana (Team Hütte). At elimination, Joelle was eliminated but got a wildcard from Ellen and was saved. In the end, Celine, Loriane, Maria and Naomi were eliminated.: Quit: Olivia Rhode; Challenge winner: Team Sayana (Alicija Köhler, Catharina Maranca, Enisa Bukvic, Jasmin Cadete Rosado, Kim Dammer, Luna Dukadjinac, Maria Willhauk, Naomi Ufelle, Melina Lucht, Sayana Ranjan & Vanessa Stanat); Wildcard: Joelle Pascai Quednau; Eliminated: Celine Hamann, Loriane Glocke, Maria Willhauk & Naomi Ufelle; Featured photographer & special guest: Ellen von Unwerth
199	4	"Social Media Edition"	28 February 2019
The girls arrived in Los Angeles. But Kim decided to quit the competition for personal reason and Jasmin couldn't fly because of problems back at home. They met with Winnie Harlow after they arrived. Winnie told the girls that they gonna be divided into 2 teams for this week's challenge. The leaders of the 2 groups were Lena and Simone. They had an Instagram challenge, where the girls had to make an Insta-story in Hollywood Boulevard. The winning team was Team Lena. They received clothes from Levi's when they arrived into the model villa. Then, the girls had an interview training with Julia Bauer. In this week's photoshoot the girls where dressed as alien stewardesses in which they were suspended in the air. Also, all of the photo where posted on Instagram and the girl who would get the most likes for her photo would be immune from elimination. At elimination, Enisa was immune for having the most likes for her photo. In the end, Catharina, Joelle and Melina were eliminated.: Quit: Kim Dammer; Challenge winner: Team Lena (Alicija Köhler, Cäcilia Zimmer, Enisa Bukvic, Julia Helm, Justine Klippenstein, Lena Lischewski, Leonela Hires, Sarah Almoril, Sayana Ranjan & Vanessa Stanat); Immune from elimination: Enisa Bukvic; Eliminated: Catharina Maranca, Joelle Juana Pascai Quednau & Melina Lucht; Featured photographer: Christian Anwander; Special guest: Julia Bauer & Winnie Harlow
200	5	"Das große Umstyling"	7 March 2019
Jasmin had arrived in Los Angeles. But the girls were not happy about that. This week was the big makeover. But with the help and advice, the girls were assisted by guest judge and Germany's Next Topmodel, season 9 winner Stefanie Giesinger. This week's photoshoot was the sedcard shoot. At the elimination, the girls walked in dresses from designer Michael Costello. But at the end of the catwalk, the girls had also to make a speech of their love for their own reflection. In the end, Leonela was eliminated.: Eliminated: Leonela Hires; Featured photographer: Max Montgomery; Special guest: Michael Costello, Stefanie Giesinger, & Wendy Iles
201	6	"Haute Couture Edition"	14 March 2019
The week started with a casting for About You. Sayana and Simone were booked for the job. At the photoshoot, the girls had to pose in the desert and in pairs. After the shoot, the girls had an Haute couture walk training with topmodel Toni Garrn. At the elimination, Enisa, Justine, Luna and Vanessa landed in the bottom four. Enisa got a wildcard from Toni and was saved. In the end, Luna was eliminated.: Booked for job: Sayana Ranjan & Simone Kowalski; Bottom four: Enisa Bukvic, Justine Klippenstein, Luna Dzek Dukadjinac & Vanessa Stanat; Wildcard: Enisa Bukvic; Eliminated: Luna Dzek Dukadjinac; Featured photographer: Mario Schmolka; Special guest: Toni Garrn; Featured client: About You
202	7	"Das Nacktshooting"	21 March 2019
The week started with a visit from supermodel Gisele Bündchen. The girls were very pleased about that. On the next day, Enisa had a panic attack and decided to quit the competition. In their next photoshoot, the girls had to pose nude with puppies. The girls also wore jewelry worth $2.5 million. After the photoshoot, Alicija was booked for a job. In the most shocking elimination yet, Jasmin was disqualified from the competition after getting involved in a physical altercation with Lena. After Jasmin left, Heidi announced that there will be no further elimination this week and no one else would be going home.: Quit: Enisa Bukvic; Booked for job: Alicija Köhler; Bottom two: Jasmin Cadete Rosado & Lena Lischewski; Disqualified: Jasmin Cadete Rosado; Eliminated: None; Featured photographer: Rankin; Special guest: Gisele Bündchen; Featured client: Federal Ministry for Digital and Transport & Rankin
203	8	"Casting Edition"	28 March 2019
The top 13 headed to Miami this week. Then, the girls had to do a casting marathon for 5 different clients. After the casting marathon, the girls flew back to Los Angeles. In L.A., the girls had their next photoshoot. The girls had to jump as elegantly as possible from a three-meter tower into a swimming pool with a big bag and in bikinis from Heidi's own collection. On the next day, the girls had to walk in a fashion show for designer Christian Cowan. After that was the elimination. Julia, Melissa and Sayana landed in the bottom three. In the end, Melissa was eliminated, thus sparing Julia and Sayana.: Booked for job: Sarah Almoril, Simone Kowalski, Tatjana Wiedemann, Theresia Fischer & Vanessa Stanat; Bottom three: Julia Helm, Melissa Hemberger & Sayana Ranjan; Eliminated: Melissa Hemberger; Featured photographer: Chuck Grant; Special guests: Christian Cowan & Zara Larsson; Featured clients: Blonde magazine, Fabrice Tardieu, InStyle Germany, Kaviar Gauche, & Nico Santos
204	9	"We love to entertain you!"	4 April 2019
The week started with a visit from moderator and entertainer Thomas Gottschalk. Alicija, Julia, Sarah and Vanessa were invited to a casting for the magazine ELLE. Alicija and Vanessa were booked for the job. In their next photoshoot, the girls had to pose in a circus with snakes. At elimination, the girls had to perform an act in front of an audience. In the end, Justine was eliminated.: Booked for job: Alicija Köhler & Vanessa Stanat; Eliminated: Justine Klippenstein; Featured photographer: Brian Bowen Smith; Special guest: Thomas Gottschalk; Featured client: Elle Germany
205	10	"Der Einzug in die Top 10"	11 April 2019
The week started with a dance teaching with Creative Director Thomas Hayo. The girls were also divided into 4 groups. After that, Cäcilia and Vanessa were invited to a casting for NYLON magazine in Amsterdam. Cäcilia was booked for the job. On the next day, the girls had a video shoot inspired by John Travolta's "Saturday Night Fever". At the elimination, the girls had a David Bowie inspired fashion show. Lena and Theresia landed in the bottom two. In the end, Theresia was eliminated.: Booked for job: Cäcilia Zimmer; Bottom two: Lena Lischewski & Theresia Fischer; Eliminated: Theresia Fischer; Featured director: Lance Drake; Special guest: Thomas Hayo; Featured client: Nylon Germany
206	11	"Boys Edition"	18 April 2019
The top 10 met with their co-partners for their next photoshoot and designer Michael Michalsky in the model villa. Michael Michalsky announced that the girls would each pose with a male model in their next photoshoot. On the next day, the girls had to pose with the male model in the rain. The girls also had a casting for John Frieda. Sarah and Simone were booked for the job. At elimination, Julia and Lena landed in the bottom two. In the end, Julia was eliminated.: Booked for job: Sarah Almoril & Simone Kowalski; Bottom two: Julia Helm & Lena Lischewski; Eliminated: Julia Helm; Featured photographer: Charlotte Rutherford; Special guest: Michael Michalsky; Featured client: John Frieda
207	12	"Glamour Edition"	25 April 2019
Heidi surprised the girls with an invitation for the amfAR Gala. Cäcilia and Vanessa were chosen to fly to New York and to go to the amfAR Gala. After that, was the next big photoshoot for the girls with star photographer Yu Tsai. The girls had a foam party with It-girl Paris Hilton. On the next day, was the elimination. The girls had to walk in elegant dresses with headdresses made of balloons. Lena and Tatjana landed in the bottom two. Paris Hilton got a wildcard from Heidi and was allowed to save one of the two girls. She chose Tatjana, while Lena was eliminated.: Bottom two: Lena Lischewski & Tatjana Wiedemann; Wildcard: Tatjana Wiedemann; Eliminated: Lena Lischewski; Featured photographer: Yu Tsai; Special guest: Kim Kardashian & Paris Hilton
208	13	"Drag Edition"	2 May 2019
The week started with dance teaching with 4 drag queens: Derrick Barry, Silky Nutmeg Ganache, Vanessa Vanjie Mateo & Nebraska Thunderfuck. After that, the girls had their next photoshoot. The girls were dressed as anime girls, while cycling a bike in the air. On the next day, the girls had a casting for Magdeburg-LosAngeles. Simone was booked for the job. At the elimination, the girls had to dance as drag queens in groups of two. Cäcilia, Sayana & Tatjana landed in the bottom three. Cäcilia was saved, leaving Sayana and Tatjana in the bottom two. Guest judge Bill Kaulitz got a wildcard and saved Sayana. In the end, Tatjana was eliminated.: Booked for job: Simone Kowalski; Bottom three: Cäcilia Zimmer, Sayana Ranjan & Tatjana Wiedemann; Wildcard: Sayana Ranjan; Eliminated: Tatjana Wiedemann; Featured photographer: Vijat Mohindra; Special guest: Bill Kaulitz; Featured client: Bill Kaulitz & Vogue Germany
209	14	"Personality Edition"	9 May 2019
The week started with a teaching with Heidi about their signature walks. On the next day, the girls had a casting for Sephora. Simone was booked for the job. After that, the girls had a body painting photoshoot on Rodeo Drive. After the shoot, Sarah was eliminated. At elimination, the girls had to show their signature walks in a fashion show in front of supermodel Naomi Campbell and photographer Matt McCabe. In the end, Caroline was eliminated.: Shoot-out: Caroline Krüger & Sarah Almoril; Eliminated outside of panel: Sarah Almoril; Booked for job & immune from elimination: Simone Kowalski; Eliminated: Caroline Krüger; Featured photographer: Matt McCabe; Special guests: Matt McCabe & Naomi Campbell; Featured client: Sephora
210	15	"Halbfinale"	16 May 2019
The week started with the Harper's Bazaar cover shoot. On the next day, the girls got visits from their family and friends. At the elimination, the girls had their last runway show. They wore Amato haute couture dresses. After that, Vanessa became the 1st finalist. Then, Simone became the 2nd finalist and Cäcilia became the 3rd finalist. Alicija and Sayana landed in the bottom two. In the end, Alicija was eliminated, making Sayana the 4th finalist. At the end of the episode, it was announced that Vanessa decided to quit the competition because of personal problems - making Cäcilia, Sayana and Simone the Top 3.: Bottom two: Alicija Köhler & Sayana Ranjan; Eliminated: Alicija Köhler; Quit: Vanessa Stanat; Special guests: Kerstin Schneider & Lena Meyer-Landrut
211	16	"Das große Finale"	23 May 2019
The final started with a girl-power inspired fashion show. Then followed the first elimination, with Cäcilia became the first grand finalist to be eliminated. Then, Sayana and Simone had to prove again on the runway. The last task was a crowd surfing photoshoot with male models. After the final runway, Simone was declared the winner of Germany's Next Topmodel.: Final three: Cäcilia Zimmer, Sayana Ranjan & Simone Kowalski; Eliminated: Cäcilia Zimmer; Personality Award: Tatjana Wiedemann; Final two: Sayana Ranjan & Simone Kowalski; Germany's Next Topmodel: Simone Kowalski; Featured photographer: Kristian Schuller; Special guests: Channing Tatum, Ellie Goulding, Jonas Brothers, Klaudia Giez, Taylor Swift, Thomas Gottschalk, Tokio Hotel & Tyra Banks

== Summaries ==
=== Results table ===
Place	Model	Episodes																
Place	Model	1 (Note: In episode 1, Marlene was originally eliminated but was saved by guest judge Lena Gercke.)	2 (Note: In episode 2, Catharina was originally eliminated but was saved by guest judge Wolfgang Joop.)	3 (Note: In episode 3, Olivia decided to quit the competition. Joelle was originally eliminated but was saved by guest judge Ellen von Unwerth.)	4 (Note: In episode 4, Kim decided to quit the competition. Jasmin was absent in this episode due to personal issues back at her home. Enisa was granted immunity from elimination for having the most likes for her photo.)	5	6 (Note: In episode 6, Enisa was in the bottom four but was saved by guest judge Toni Garrn.)	7 (Note: In episode 7, Enisa decided to quit the competition. Furthermore, Jasmin was disqualified from the competition after getting involved in a physical altercation with Lena, which resulted in a non-elimination.)	8	9	10	11	12 (Note: In episode 12, Tatjana landed in the bottom two with Lena but was saved by guest judge Paris Hilton.)	13 (Note: In episode 13, Sayana landed in the bottom three but was saved by guest judge Bill Kaulitz.)	14 (Note: In episode 14, Sarah was eliminated outside of panel after losing the shoot-out. Simone was booked for the job and was granted immunity from elimination.)	15 (Note: In episode 15, Vanessa decided to quit the competition—making Cäcilia, Sayana and Simone the finalists.)	16	
1	Simone	SAFE	SAFE	SAFE	SAFE	SAFE	HIGH	SAFE	SAFE	SAFE	SAFE	SAFE	SAFE	SAFE	IMM	HIGH	SAFE	WIN
2	Sayana	SAFE	SAFE	SAFE	SAFE	SAFE	HIGH	SAFE	LOW	SAFE	SAFE	SAFE	SAFE	SAVE	SAFE	LOW	SAFE	OUT
3	Cäcilia	SAFE	SAFE	SAFE	SAFE	SAFE	SAFE	SAFE	SAFE	SAFE	SAFE	SAFE	SAFE	LOW	SAFE	SAFE	OUT	
4	Vanessa	SAFE	SAFE	SAFE	SAFE	SAFE	LOW	SAFE	SAFE	SAFE	SAFE	SAFE	SAFE	SAFE	SAFE	QUIT		
5	Alicija	SAFE	SAFE	SAFE	SAFE	SAFE	HIGH	HIGH	SAFE	SAFE	SAFE	SAFE	SAFE	SAFE	SAFE	OUT		
6	Caroline	SAFE	SAFE	SAFE	SAFE	SAFE	SAFE	SAFE	SAFE	SAFE	SAFE	SAFE	SAFE	LOW	OUT			
7	Sarah	SAFE	SAFE	SAFE	SAFE	SAFE	HIGH	SAFE	SAFE	SAFE	SAFE	SAFE	SAFE	LOW	OUT			
8	Tatjana	SAFE	SAFE	SAFE	SAFE	SAFE	SAFE	SAFE	SAFE	SAFE	SAFE	SAFE	SAVE	OUT				
9	Lena	SAFE	SAFE	SAFE	SAFE	SAFE	SAFE	SAVE	SAFE	LOW	LOW	SAFE	OUT					
10	Julia	SAFE	SAFE	SAFE	SAFE	SAFE	SAFE	SAFE	LOW	SAFE	SAFE	OUT						
11	Theresia	SAFE	SAFE	SAFE	SAFE	SAFE	SAFE	SAFE	SAFE	SAFE	OUT							
12	Justine	SAFE	SAFE	SAFE	SAFE	SAFE	LOW	SAFE	SAFE	OUT								
13	Melissa	SAFE	SAFE	SAFE	SAFE	SAFE	SAFE	SAFE	OUT									
14	Jasmin	SAFE	SAFE	SAFE	—N/a	SAFE	SAFE	DQ										
15	Enisa	SAFE	SAFE	SAFE	IMM	SAFE	SAVE	QUIT										
16	Luna	SAFE	SAFE	SAFE	SAFE	SAFE	OUT											
17	Leonela	SAFE	SAFE	SAFE	SAFE	OUT												
18-20	Catharina	SAFE	SAVE	SAFE	OUT													
18-20	Joelle	SAFE	SAFE	SAVE	OUT													
18-20	Melina	SAFE	SAFE	SAFE	OUT													
21	Kim	SAFE	SAFE	SAFE	QUIT													
22-25	Celine	SAFE	SAFE	OUT														
22-25	Loriane	SAFE	SAFE	OUT														
22-25	Maria	SAFE	SAFE	OUT														
22-25	Naomi	SAFE	SAFE	OUT														
26	Olivia	SAFE	SAFE	QUIT														
27-30	Anastasiya	SAFE	OUT															
27-30	Ann-Kathrin	SAFE	OUT															
27-30	Debora	SAFE	OUT															
27-30	Marlene	SAVE	OUT															

The contestant withdrew from the competition
The contestant was immune from elimination
The contestant was in danger of elimination
The contestant was in the bottom or originally eliminated from the competition but was saved by the guest judge
The contestant was disqualified from the competition
The contestant was eliminated outside of judging panel
The contestant was eliminated
The contestant won the competition

=== Photo shoot guide ===
- Episode 2 photo shoot: Snow queens
- Episode 3 photo shoot: Posing as farm girls with Jordan Barrett
- Episode 4 photo shoot: Alien stewardesses
- Episode 5 photo shoot: Sedcard
- Episode 6 photo shoot: Gypsies in the desert
- Episode 7 photo shoot: Nude with puppies and jewelry
- Episode 8 photo shoot: Jumping from a three-meter tower in a swimsuit with a huge bag
- Episode 9 photo shoot: Posing in a circus with snakes
- Episode 10 video shoot: John Travolta's "Saturday Night Fever" inspired
- Episode 11 photo shoot: Posing in the rain with a male model
- Episode 12 photo shoot: Foam party with Paris Hilton
- Episode 13 photo shoot: Anime girls on a flying bike
- Episode 14 photo shoot: Body painting on Rodeo Drive
- Episode 15 photo shoot: Harper's Bazaar cover
- Episode 16 photo shoot: Crowd surfing

== Controversies ==
In episode 7, there was a physical fight between contestants Jasmin Cadete and Lena Lischewski shown on Television, leading to the disqualification of Cadete. The lawyer of Lischewski sued ProSieben and the cameramen saying: "It is unacceptable that a television station films how a minor is beaten by another participant during the filming and the present camera crew does not intervene immediately, but continues to film the scene."

After Vanessa Stanat quit, ProSieben took over her official Instagram account. Shortly after, Stanat did not have access to her personal account either. Many, including Stanat herself, believe that this happened due to ProSieben being angry about her announcing her quit just a few weeks before the finale. Rebecca Mir took to Instagram to discredit Stanat, however she and ProSieben received backlash, because ProSieben shared personal information about Stanat with Mir.

In August 2022, in the wake of allegations by former participants against Germany's Next Topmodel, the winner Simone Kowalski also spoke up as she said: "Top Model is very dangerous for today's and the previous generations! Many young women have mental trauma! Heidi says she's just being the hostess, but she has a responsibility to at least face the pain and trauma that has been inflicted on many girls!". Kowalski also teamed up with America's Next Top Model winner Lisa D'Amato to talk about her traumatic experiences with Germany's Next Topmodel. She said during the interview, that Germany's Next Topmodel made her sick: "They took everything from me, I almost lost my family, my friends, all my money. It was inhuman - they broke me mentally. I came on the show healthy and got sick." She also said that after the show she was forced against her will to work for Heidi Klum's father. To former contestants defending the show, she says: "Good for you, but not for everyone". In her opinion, Germany's Next Topmodel should be discontinued.
