= Giesinger =

Giesinger is a German surname. Notable people with the surname include:

- Ilse Giesinger (born 1947), Austrian politician
- Max Giesinger (born 1988), German singer-songwriter
- Stefanie Giesinger (born 1996), German model
