= Germany's Next Topmodel season 13 =

Germany's Next Topmodel
- Season 13
- Judges: Heidi Klum; Thomas Hayo; Michael Michalsky
- No. of contestants: 29
- Winner: Toni Dreher-Adenuga
- No. of episodes: 16

Release
- Original network: ProSieben
- Original release: 8 February – 24 May 2018

Season chronology
- ← Previous; Season 12 Next → Season 14

The thirteenth season of Germany's Next Topmodel aired on German television network ProSieben from 8 February to 24 May 2018 under the catch phrase Welcome to Paradise.

This is the final season to have Thomas Hayo and Michael Michalsky return for their spots as judges. This is also the last season to have the teams and battle concept.

The winner of this season was 18-year-old Toni Dreher-Adenuga from Stuttgart, representing Team Michael. Her prizes include:

- A modeling contract with Günther Klum's OneEins GmbH Management worth €140,000.
- A cover and spread in the German edition of Harper's Bazaar.
- A cash prize worth €100,000.
- An Opel Adam.

The following prize have been removed:

- A cover and spread in the German edition of Cosmopolitan.

The international destinations this season were set in Las Terrenas, Los Angeles, San Diego, New York, Cancún, Lisbon, Paris and Havana.

== Contestants ==
(ages stated are at start of contest)

Team	Contestant	Age	Hometown	Finish	Place
Michael	Selma Toroy	24	Nürnberg	Episode 2	29
Michael	Ivana Rajić-Hrnjić	22	Bad Wildungen	Episode 2	28 (quit)
Michael	Viktoria Wendell	21	Detmold	Episode 2	27–26
Thomas	Lania Barzanji	22	Hamm	Episode 2	27–26
Thomas	Liane Polt	17	Kufstein, Austria	Episode 3	25
Michael	Julia Freimuth	17	Plattling	Episode 3	24
Thomas	Elisabeth 'Lis' Kanzler	22	Pfaffenhofen an der Ilm	Episode 4	23–22
Thomas	Valerie Wersche	24	Zorneding	Episode 4	23–22
Thomas	Karoline Seul	19	Wesel	Episode 5	21
Thomas	Franziska Schwager	23	Hamburg	Episode 5	20–19
Michael	Isabella Özdemir	22	Pfullendorf	Episode 5	20–19
Michael	Sherezade 'Sarah' Amiri	19	Wolfschlugen	Episode 6	18
Michael	Gerda Sadzeviciute	25	Köln	Episode 7	17
Michael	Anne Volkmann	23	Passau	Episode 7	16
Thomas	Stephanie Groll	19	Starnberg	Episode 8	15
Thomas	Shari Streich	23	Hamburg	Episode 9	14
Thomas	Abigail Odoom	20	Hürth	Episode 9	13
Thomas	Bruna Rodrigues	24	Offenbach	Episode 10	12-11
Thomas	Victoria Pavlas	19	Ebreichsdorf, Austria	Episode 10	12-11
Thomas	Zoe Saip	18	Bad Vöslau, Austria	Episode 11	10
Thomas	Trixi Giese	17	Paris, France	Episode 12	9
Michael	Klaudia Giez	21	Berlin	Episode 14	8-7
Michael	Sara Leutenegger	23	Dübendorf, Switzerland	Episode 14	8-7
Michael	Sally Haas	17	Remscheid	Episode 14	6
Thomas	Jennifer Michalczyk	22	Niederkassel	Episode 15	5
Thomas	Christina Peno	21	Dudenhofen	Episode 16	4
Michael	Pia Riegel	22	München	Episode 16	3
Michael	Julianna Townsend	20	Klein-Winternheim	Episode 16	2
Michael	Oluwatoniloba 'Toni' Dreher-Adenuga	18	Stuttgart	Episode 16	1

== Episode summaries ==
No. overall	No. in season	Title	Original release date
180	1	"Auftakt in der Karibik"	8 February 2018
The 13th season of Germany's Next Top Model started with a big casting. Out of 100 applicants, only 50 girls have made it. They flew to the Caribbean. There, they had their first photoshoot and their first walk in front of Heidi. 29 girls made it to the next round.: Featured photographer: Shayan Asgharnia
181	2	"Das Nackt-Shooting"	15 February 2018
The new week started with a catwalk training. After that, the girls had to walk against each other in a challenge. Each one girl of their team. The challenge has won by Team Michael. The photoshoot this week was a nude photoshoot on the beach. The girls were shocked and unhappy about that. After the shoot, Selma was eliminated. At elimination, Ivana decided to quit the competition. After that, Lania and Viktoria W. were eliminated for their weak performance in the photoshoot.: Challenge winner: Team Michael; Shoot-out: Ivana Rajić-Hrnjić & Selma Toroy; Eliminated outside of panel: Selma Toroy; Best performers: Klaudia Giez & Pia Riegel; Quit: Ivana Rajić-Hrnjić; Bottom four: Gerda Lewis, Lania Barzanji, Liane Polt & Viktoria Wendell; Eliminated: Lania Barzanji & Viktoria Wendell; Featured photographer: Rankin; Special guests: Nikeata Thompson & Papis Loveday
182	3	"Sprung in den Winter"	22 February 2018
The week started with a photoshoot. The girls had to jump on a trampoline and were wearing fur. After the photoshoot, Liane was eliminated. The girls had their first casting for the Christian Cowan fashion show. All girls except Anne, Christina, Julia and Klaudia were booked. At elimination, Anne, Christina, Isabella, Julia, Klaudia, Victoria and Zoe found them self at the bottom. In the end, Julia was eliminated for her bad performance at the shoot and for not booking the job.: Shoot-out: Gerda Lewis & Liane Polt; Eliminated outside of panel: Liane Polt; Booked for job: Abigail Odoom, Bruna Rodrigues, Franziska Schwager, Gerda Lewis, Isabella Özedemir, Jennifer Michalczyk, Julianna Townsend, Karoline Seul, Lis Kanzler, Pia Riegel, Sally Haas, Sara Leutenegger, Sarah Amiri, Shari Streich, Stephanie Groll, Toni Dreher-Adenuga, Trixi Giese, Valerie Wersche, Victoria Pavlas & Zoe Saip; Best performer: Pia Riegel; Bottom seven: Anne Volkmann, Christina Peno, Isabella Özedemir, Julia Freimuth, Klaudia Giez, Victoria Pavlas & Zoe Saip; Eliminated: Julia Freimuth; Featured photographer: Max Montgomery; Special guests: Tim Labenda; Featured client: Christian Cowan
183	4	"Das große Umstyling!"	1 March 2018
The girls arrived in Los Angeles. There, they got their new makeovers. On the next day, the girls had a sedcard photoshoot. At elimination, Lis and Valerie were eliminated.: Bottom four: Karoline Seul, Lis Kansler, Trixi Giese & Valerie Wersche; Eliminated: Lis Kanzler & Valerie Wersche; Featured photographer: Brian Bowen Smith; Special guests: Kerstin Weng & Wendy Iles
184	5	"Das Einhorn-Rodeo"	8 March 2018
The week started with a Unicorn Rodeo photoshoot. After the shoot, Karoline was eliminated. On the next day, Abigail, Bruna and Sally flew to Cancun, Mexico for a casting for the German InStyle. Sally was booked for the job. The other 17 girls had a challenge, where they had to change into a party outfit in a lift and against each other. The challenge was won by Team Thomas. At elimination, Bruna, Franziska, Gerda, Isabella, Jennifer, Pia, Sara, Shari, Victoria and Zoe landed in the bottom ten. In the end, Franziska and Isabella were eliminated.: Shoot-out: Karoline Seul & Trixi Giese; Eliminated outside of panel: Karoline Seul; Challenge winner: Team Thomas; Booked for job: Sally Haas; Best performer: Klaudia Giez; Bottom ten: Bruna Rodrigues, Franziska Schwager, Gerda Lewis, Isabella Özedemir, Jennifer Michalczyk, Pia Riegel, Sara Leutenegger, Shari Streich, Victoria Pavlas & Zoe Saip; Eliminated: Franziska Schwager & Isabella Özedemir; Featured photographer: Shane Russack; Special guests: Caroline Daur, Kerstin Weng, Nikeata Thompson & Papis Loveday; Featured client: InStyle Germany
185	6	"GNTM Hip-Hop Edition"	15 March 2018
The week started with a Hip Hop video shoot with Brooke Candy. Most of the girls did not do so well, but Pia and Shari were praised. After that, Klaudia, Toni and Zoe were invited to a casting for Nylon magazine to Portugal. Zoe was booked for the job. The other girls had a challenge. They had to dance against each other. The challenge was won by Team Thomas. At elimination, Sarah was eliminated.: Challenge winner: Team Thomas; Booked for job: Zoe Saip; Best performers: Pia Riegel & Shari Streich; Bottom three: Gerda Lewis, Jennifer Michalczyk & Sarah Amiri; Eliminated: Sarah Amiri; Special guests: Brooke Candy, Cro, Dennis Jauch & Jarren Barboza; Featured client: Nylon Germany
186	7	"Boys, Boys, Boys"	22 March 2018
The week started with a photoshoot. The girls had to pose with a nude male model. After the shoot, Gerda was eliminated. Anne, Bruna, Christina, Julianna, Pia, Sally, Sara, Toni, Victoria & Zoe were invited to a casting for Deichmann. Bruna, Julianna, Pia, Sally and Toni were booked for the job. The other 6 girls had a workout with James Wilson. At elimination, Abigail, Anne, Shari, Victoria & Zoe landed in the bottom five. In the end, Anne was eliminated.: Shoot-out: Gerda Lewis & Jennifer Michalczyk; Eliminated outside of panel: Gerda Lewis; Booked for job: Bruna Rodrigues, Julianna Townsend, Pia Riegel, Sally Haas & Toni Dreher-Adenuga; Best performer: Julianna Townsend; Bottom five: Abigail Odoom, Anne Volkmann, Shari Streich, Victoria Pavlas & Zoe Saip; Eliminated: Anne Volkmann; Featured photographer: Yu Tsai; Special guests: Andreas Conze & James Wilson; Featured client: Deichmann
187	8	"Magic Bride"	29 March 2018
Bruna, Christina, Sara and Trixi were invited for a casting for Elle magazine in Paris, France. Christina was booked for the job. The girls had a video shoot. They had to portray a bride in a pub, where each girl also had a different emotion to portray. At elimination, the girls had a challenge. The theme was a beauty pageant. They had to walk against each other, had to make a speech and say why they are better than the other one. Klaudia won the challenge and got immunity, but she also had the choice to save an eliminated girl. Stephanie and Trixi were eliminated, but Klaudia decided to save Trixi, while Stephanie had to leave.: Booked for job: Christina Peno; Challenge winner & immune from elimination: Klaudia Giez; Bottom four: Jennifer Michalczyk, Shari Streich, Stephanie Groll & Trixi Giese; Originally eliminated but saved: Trixi Giese; Eliminated: Stephanie Groll; Featured director: Lance Drake; Special guests: Magic Mike Live crew; Featured client: Elle Germany
188	9	"Action Edition"	5 April 2018
The week started with a photo shoot. The girls had to portray Hollywood divas in extreme heights. After the shoot, Shari was eliminated. The girls had a casting for About You. Julianna and Toni were booked and flew to Havana, Cuba. But they also got immunity for the next elimination. At elimination, Abigail, Bruna and Victoria landed in the bottom three. In the end, Abigail was eliminated for her bad performance at the photoshoot.: Shoot-out: Jennifer Michalczyk & Shari Streich; Eliminated outside of panel: Shari Streich; Booked for job & immune from elimination: Julianna Townsend & Toni Dreher-Adenuga; Best performer: Christina Peno; Bottom three: Abigail Odoom, Bruna Rodrigues & Victoria Pavlas; Eliminated: Abigail Odoom; Featured photographer: Markus Schäfer; Special guests: Julian Jansen & Sofia Tsakiridou; Featured client: About You
189	10	"Surprise, Surprise"	12 April 2018
The week started with a fashion gymnastics photoshoot. Christina, Julianna, Pia and Toni were invited for a casting in Lisbon, Portugal. Pia and Toni were booked for the job. The other 8 girls moved in their new home. At elimination, the girls had a Mickey Mouse runway show. After that, Bruna and Victoria were eliminated, because of their weak performance at the photoshoot.: Booked for job: Pia Riegel & Toni Dreher-Adenuga; Best performer: Klaudia Giez; Eliminated: Bruna Rodrigues & Victoria Pavlas; Featured photographer: Oliver Beckmann; Featured client & special guests: Wincent Weiss
190	11	"Social Media Edition"	19 April 2018
The week started with a photoshoot. The girls were driving through Los Angeles and were taking a shower. After that, the girls had a casting for Gilette Venus. Christina was booked for the job. Then the girls had an interview with Julia Bauer. At the end of the teaching, it was revealed that Klaudia, Pia and Trixi were the best. At elimination, Zoe was eliminated.: Booked for job: Christina Peno; Eliminated: Zoe Saip; Featured photographer: Christian Anwander; Special guests: Julia Bauer; Featured client: Gillette Venus & Braun
191	12	"Family & Friends"	26 April 2018
The week started with a photo challenge. But what the girls did not know was that they got visits from their family and friends except Trixi. Toni and Klaudia went with Heidi to the amfAR Gala. This week the girls had a 60s housewives video shoot. The girls also had to sell a product. At elimination, Sally, Sara and Trixi landed in the bottom three. In the end, Trixi was eliminated.: Best performer: Toni Dreher-Adenuga; Bottom three: Sally Haas, Sara Leutenegger & Trixi Giese; Eliminated: Trixi Giese; Featured director: Justin Wu
192	13	"Water Edition"	3 May 2018
This week started with a teaching. The girls learn how to pose underwater. Christina, Jennifer and Julianna were invited for a casting for Maybelline. Julianna was booked for the job. At the next day, the girls had an Underwater mermaid photoshoot. After that, the girls had a challenge. The girls were divided into groups. They had to portray twins with their styling. Sally and Toni won the challenge. At elimination, Nobody was eliminated. Later, Heidi announced, that all girls, who weren't booked for a job yet (Jennifer, Klaudia and Sara) plus Toni, are next week in the Shoot out and two girls will be going home.: Challenge winner: Toni Dreher-Adenuga & Sally Haas; Booked for job & immune from elimination: Julianna Townsend; Eliminated: None; Featured photographer: Chris Straley; Special guests: Virginia Henkins & Wolfgang Joop; Featured client: Maybelline New York
193	14	"Drag Edition"	10 May 2018
The week started with a casting for MCM Worldwide. Christina and Toni were booked for the job. After that, the girl a Gender swap photoshoot with Alessandra Ambrosio. After the shoot, Klaudia and Sara were eliminated. At elimination, the remaining 6 girls had a runway show with the drag queens. After that, Sally was eliminated because of her weak performance at the photoshoot and runway.: Shoot-out: Jennifer Michalczyk, Klaudia Giez, Sara Leutenegger & Toni Dreher-Adenuga; Eliminated outside of panel: Klaudia Giez & Sara Leutenegger; Booked for job: Christina Peno & Toni Dreher-Adenuga; Best performer: Toni Dreher-Adenuga; Bottom two: Jennifer Michalczyk & Sally Haas; Eliminated: Sally Haas; Featured photographer: Kristian Schuller; Special guest: Alessandra Ambrosio, Farrah Moan, Jaidynn Diore Fierce, Laganja Estranja, Misty Violet, Moni Stat, & Morgan McMichaels; Featured client: MCM Worldwide
194	15	"Das Halbfinale"	17 May 2018
The week started with the Harper's Bazaar cover shot. On the next day, the girls had a last runway training. At elimination, the girls had their last runway show and were wearing Jean Paul Gaultier couture dresses. Heidi announced that Toni is the 1st finalist. After that, Pia became the 2nd finalist. Then, Christina became the 3rd finalist. Jennifer and Julianna landed in the bottom two and Jennifer was eliminated making Julianna the 4th finalist.: Bottom two: Jennifer Michalczyk & Julianna Townsend; Eliminated: Jennifer Michalczyk; Featured photographer: Regan Cameron; Special guests: Kerstin Schneider, Nikeata Thompson & Papis Loveday
195	16	"Das große Finale"	24 May 2018
The final started with a drag queen fashion show. Then followed the first decision. Christina and Julianna landed in the bottom two and Christina was the first eliminated. Then they had to prove again on the runway. After that, Pia was the second eliminated. The last task was a photoshoot with german singer Wincent Weiss. After the final runway, Toni was declared the winner of Germany's Next Topmodel.: Final four: Christina Peno, Julianna Townsend, Pia Riegel & Toni Dreher-Adenuga; Bottom two: Christina Peno & Julianna Townsend; Eliminated: Christina Peno; Final three: Julianna Townsend, Pia Riegel & Toni Dreher-Adenuga; Bottom two: Julianna Townsend & Pia Riegel; Eliminated: Pia Riegel; Personality Award: Klaudia Giez; Final two: Julianna Townsend & Toni Dreher-Adenuga; Germany's Next Topmodel: Toni Dreher-Adenuga; Featured photographer: Rankin; Special guests: Cro, Rebecca Mir, Rita Ora, Shawn Mendes & Wincent Weiss

== Summaries ==
=== Results table ===
Team Thomas	Team Michael

Place	Model	Episodes																	
Place	Model	1	2 (Note: In Episode 2, Selma was eliminated outside of panel after losing the shoot-out. Furthermore, Ivana decided to quit the competition.)	3 (Note: In Episode 3, Liane was eliminated outside of panel after losing the shoot-out.)	4	5 (Note: In Episode 5, Karoline was eliminated outside of panel after losing the shoot-out.)	6	7 (Note: In episode 7, Gerda was eliminated outside of panel after losing the shoot-out.)	8 (Note: In episode 8, Trixi was originally eliminated but was saved by Klaudia as she won the elimination walk and had a chance to save one girl.)	9 (Note: In Episode 9, Shari was eliminated outside of panel after losing the shoot-out. Julianna and Toni were booked for the job and were granted immunity from elimination.)	10	11	12	13 (Note: In Episode 13, Julianna was booked for the job and was granted immunity from elimination. Jennifer, Klaudia, Sara, and Toni landed in the bottom four but were saved. Nevertheless, they were put into the shoot-out.)	14 (Note: In Episode 14, Klaudia and Sara were eliminated outside of panel after losing the shoot-out.)	15	16		
1	Toni	SAFE	SAFE	SAFE	SAFE	SAFE	SAFE	SAFE	SAFE	IMM	SAFE	SAFE	HIGH	LOW	HIGH	HIGH	HIGH	HIGH	WIN
2	Julianna	SAFE	SAFE	SAFE	SAFE	SAFE	SAFE	HIGH	SAFE	IMM	SAFE	SAFE	SAFE	IMM	SAFE	LOW	LOW	LOW	OUT
3	Pia	SAFE	HIGH	HIGH	SAFE	LOW	HIGH	SAFE	SAFE	SAFE	SAFE	SAFE	SAFE	SAFE	SAFE	SAFE	SAFE	OUT	
4	Christina	SAFE	SAFE	LOW	SAFE	SAFE	SAFE	SAFE	SAFE	HIGH	SAFE	SAFE	SAFE	SAFE	SAFE	SAFE	OUT		
5	Jennifer	SAFE	SAFE	SAFE	SAFE	LOW	LOW	SAFE	LOW	SAFE	SAFE	SAFE	SAFE	LOW	SAFE	OUT			
6	Sally	SAFE	SAFE	SAFE	SAFE	SAFE	SAFE	SAFE	SAFE	SAFE	SAFE	SAFE	LOW	SAFE	OUT				
7–8	Klaudia	SAFE	HIGH	LOW	SAFE	HIGH	SAFE	SAFE	IMM	SAFE	HIGH	HIGH	SAFE	LOW	OUT				
7–8	Sara	SAFE	SAFE	SAFE	SAFE	LOW	SAFE	SAFE	SAFE	SAFE	SAFE	SAFE	LOW	LOW	OUT				
9	Trixi	SAFE	SAFE	SAFE	LOW	SAFE	SAFE	SAFE	SAVE	SAFE	SAFE	SAFE	OUT						
10	Zoe	LOW	SAFE	LOW	SAFE	LOW	SAFE	LOW	SAFE	SAFE	SAFE	OUT							
11–12	Bruna	SAFE	SAFE	SAFE	HIGH	LOW	SAFE	SAFE	SAFE	LOW	OUT								
11–12	Victoria	SAFE	SAFE	LOW	SAFE	LOW	SAFE	LOW	SAFE	LOW	OUT								
13	Abigail	SAFE	SAFE	SAFE	SAFE	SAFE	SAFE	LOW	SAFE	OUT									
14	Shari	SAFE	SAFE	SAFE	SAFE	LOW	HIGH	LOW	LOW	OUT									
15	Stephanie	SAFE	SAFE	SAFE	SAFE	SAFE	SAFE	SAFE	OUT										
16	Anne	LOW	SAFE	LOW	SAFE	SAFE	SAFE	OUT											
17	Gerda	LOW	LOW	SAFE	SAFE	LOW	LOW	OUT											
18	Sarah	SAFE	SAFE	SAFE	SAFE	SAFE	OUT												
19–20	Franziska	SAFE	SAFE	SAFE	SAFE	OUT													
19–20	Isabella	SAFE	SAFE	LOW	SAFE	OUT													
21	Karoline	SAFE	SAFE	SAFE	LOW	OUT													
22–23	Lis	SAFE	SAFE	SAFE	OUT														
22–23	Valerie	SAFE	SAFE	SAFE	OUT														
24	Julia	SAFE	SAFE	OUT															
25	Liane	SAFE	LOW	OUT															
26–27	Lania	SAFE	OUT																
26–27	Viktoria	SAFE	OUT																
28	Ivana	LOW	QUIT																
29	Selma	LOW	OUT																

The contestant was eliminated outside of judging panel
The contestant withdrew from the competition
The contestant was immune from elimination
The contestant was originally eliminated from the competition but was saved
The contestant won best photo
The contestant was in danger of elimination
The contestant was eliminated
The contestant won the competition

=== Photo shoot guide ===
- Episode 1 photo shoot: 60 second test shoot (Casting)
- Episode 2 photo shoot: Nude on the beach
- Episode 3 photo shoot: Wearing fur whilst jumping on a trampoline
- Episode 4 photo shoot: Sedcards
- Episode 5 photo shoot: Fairies on a Unicorn Rodeo
- Episode 6 video shoot: Hip Hop music video
- Episode 7 photo shoot: Posing with a nude male model
- Episode 8 video shoot: Brides in a pub with the Magic Mike crew
- Episode 9 photo shoot: Hollywood divas on the roof
- Episode 10 photo shoot: Fashion gymnastics in mid-air
- Episode 11 photo shoot: Taking a shower in Los Angeles
- Episode 12 video shoot: 60's wives whilst selling a product
- Episode 13 photo shoot: Underwater mermaids
- Episode 14 photo shoot: Gender Swap with Alessandra Ambrosio
- Episode 15 photo shoot: Harper's Bazaar cover
- Episode 16 photo shoot: Posing with singer Wincent Weiss
