= Simone Kowalski =

German fashion model

- Born: 25 July 1997 (age 29); Stade, Lower Saxony, Germany
- Occupation: Model
- Years active: 2019–present

Simone "Simi" Kowalski (born 25 July 1997) is a German fashion model who became known as the winner of the fourteenth cycle of Germany's Next Topmodel in 2019. She is sometimes referred to as Simi.

== Life and career ==
Kowalski lives in Stade. In her youth she practiced athletics at VfL Stade. She studies international primary school teaching.

In 2019, she participated in the 14th season of Germany's Next Topmodel. In the final of the casting show, which took place on May 23, 2019 in Düsseldorf's ISS Dome, she was chosen as the winner. She received a contract with the model agency ONEeins fab Management, prize money of 100,000 euros and a cover shoot for the fashion magazine Harper's Bazaar.

In 2020 Kowalski said about Germany's Next Topmodel that "it is not right that it is perceived as entertainment, how young people make each other down." She also stated, that she is not able to watch the show.

In August 2022 in the wake of allegations by former participants against Germany's Next Topmodel, Simone Kowalski also spoke up as she said: "Top Model is very dangerous for today's and the previous generations! Many young women have mental trauma! Heidi says she's just being the hostess, but she has a responsibility to at least face the pain and trauma that has been inflicted on many girls!". Kowalski also teamed up with America's Next Top Model contestant Lisa D'Amato to talk about her traumatic experiences with Germany's Next Topmodel. She said during the interview, that Germany's Next Topmodel made her sick: "They took everything from me, I almost lost my family, my friends, all my money. It was inhuman - they broke me mentally. I came on the show healthy and got sick." She also said that after the show she was forced against her will to work for Heidi Klum's father. To former contestants defending the show, she says: "Good for you, but not for everyone". In her opinion, Germany's Next Topmodel should be discontinued.
