= Toni Dreher-Adenuga =

German fashion model

- Born: Oluwatoniloba Dreher-Adenuga; 27 November 1999 (age 26); Stuttgart, Baden-Württemberg, Germany
- Occupation: Model
- Years active: 2018–present
- Modeling information
- Hair color: Black
- Eye color: Dark brown
- Agency: ONEeins fab Management

Oluwatoniloba "Toni" Dreher-Adenuga (born 27 November 1999) is a German fashion model who became known as the winner of the thirteenth cycle of Germany's Next Topmodel in 2018. She is sometimes referred to as Toni.

== Life and career ==
Dreher-Adenuga was born in Stuttgart. She has an older sister and a younger brother. Her parents migrated from Nigeria to Germany in 1986. She attended the Stuttgart girl Gymnasium St. Agnes where she got her Abitur in 2017. She performs as a slam poet and leads a youth church service of the free church Body of Christ Church.

In 2018, she took part in the thirteenth season of Germany's Next Topmodel and was designated as the winner during the finale, which took place on 24 May 2018 in the ISS Dome of Düsseldorf. As such, she earned a modelling contract with the agency ONEeins fab Management, a car, and a price of 100,000 euros.
