= Mapplethorpe: Look at the Pictures =

- Film poster
- Directed by: Randy Barbato; Fenton Bailey
- Produced by: Katharina Otto-Bernstein
- Starring: Debbie Harry; Fran Lebowitz; Robert Mapplethorpe; Paul Martineau; Brooke Shields
- Music by: David Benjamin Steinberg
- Production company: Film Manufacturers Inc.
- Distributed by: HBO
- Release date: January 2016 (Sundance)
- Running time: 108 minutes
- Country: United States
- Language: English

Mapplethorpe: Look at the Pictures is a 2016 American documentary film about the photographer Robert Mapplethorpe, directed and executive produced by Randy Barbato and Fenton Bailey, and produced by Katharina Otto-Bernstein for Film Manufacturers Inc.

Mapplethorpe: Look at the Pictures, received its premiere at Sundance Film Festival in January 2016, followed by the international premiere at the Berlin Film Festival in February, and a world television premiere on HBO in April. The film was released theatrically in the US and UK in April 2016.

== Selected cast ==
- Debbie Harry
- Fran Lebowitz
- Robert Mapplethorpe
- Paul Martineau
- Brooke Shields

== Reception ==
Izy Radwanska Zhang, writing for the British Journal of Photography, stated "Aside from telling a gripping story, Bailey and Barbato have succeeded in capturing the overwhelming sense of adoration and emotional paralysis felt by all those who were influenced by Mapplethorpe."

Peter Bradshaw, writing in The Guardian, stated that it was an "interesting if flawed documentary study", that "the movie is, for me, a little uncritical on the subject of Mapplethorpe’s weaknesses: his lucrative celebrity portraits now look, frankly, uninteresting" and "for me, the problem with this film is that it doesn’t analyse Mapplethorpe’s much admired photographs of flowers. How seriously did the artist take these images – how seriously should we take them? Was it that pistels and stamens and petals resembled genitalia? Is that not the point? Or were the flowers simply there to deflect criticism, to underscore a spurious context and artistic good faith? It’s difficult to tell. This otherwise thorough study does justice to Mapplethorpe’s talent."
