= TRIP – Remix Your Experience =

TRIP – Remix Your Experience is a German Gesamtkunstwerk, a synthesis of the arts, authored and produced by Frank Otto and Bernt Köhler-Adams in 2005. As early as December 2004, it was premiered for the very first time as a multimedia installation at the Instituto Superior de Arte under the auspices of the Havana Film Festival. The world premiere as an experimental film took place in September 2005 at Expo 2005 in the prefecture of Aichi in Japan as an element of the official supporting cultural programme for the German pavilion. A full-scale performance was given for the first time in December 2005 in the US at Bergamot Station in California.

== Content and Plots ==
In all of the forms in which this psychedelic work is depicted, the recipient viewer/listener is called upon as the “final author” to allow their own individual storyline to arise. The basis for the cinematic-musical concept piece is formed by a Progressive rock piece of music 74 minutes long. The session formation “The Element Project” interprets a variety of human relationships to the environment, to nature and love in English. The spectrum of stylistic tools ranging from Rock to Jazz, Blues, Ethno and on to the avant-garde defines the dramatisation of four different films.

- artwork is a painting performance on the floor which comes about before a bookshelf wall of video films. It tells the tale of a housepainter and how, for him, the fresh paint he applies seems to become a painting that grows larger and larger in the course of his boring work. He encounters a mermaid thereby, who takes on human form in association with the fairy tale by Hans Christian Andersen, yet is unable to speak and can no longer leave her element. He finds her shyness so appealing that he follows her in her travels, trying time and again to win her affections, until he finally grasps that he will have to adapt himself to her and becomes one with the painting.
- seamusic is a diving excursion to unknown creatures in the underwater world: from macro-footage of plankton to symbiotic relationships and a crab riding rodeo-style on an alga in an underwater storm, all the way to dynamic diving camera sequences of moray eels on the hunt. Apart from “speed-ups” to illustrate the motoric movement of sea cucumbers, all of the shots are genuine documentary film footage of nature.
- playing planet uses docufiction to juxtapose the relationships of different cultures from 15 countries. The woman who lives in a traditional Sudanese family while working in a scientific laboratory, or the young American woman (Amber Steele) who uses provocative behaviour that deviates from the norm to put herself at a distance to her warfare-conducting homeland. The flight of an Indian couple to enable a marriage based on love, or the struggle to obtain justice for oneself in Haiti. Accounts of a Brazilian voodoo cult and on to the magic of Chinese dragons, of dynamite fishing to sport diving, the joy of having a meal and the kick from a parachute jump.
- In track 2, a young woman riding the underground subway explores the thoughts and dreams of her fellow travellers within the tunnel walls. 30 episodes by 30 film-makers in just as many cinematic styles. The range encompasses animation film, collages, B/W silent film, photo film, art film, karaoke and video clips in stories about the ceremonial birth of Earth, duelling, love, lost toys, discovering the unknown, Barbie and Ken, and lots more.

As regards the 8 additional video-wall films from the bookshelf wall in “artwork”, these equally deal with a mimical portrait that interprets the music, two computer animations, two VJ productions and documentary footage of the painting performance, straight through to the musicians involved.

== Forms of Depiction ==
- The feature-length film version shows the four 4:3 films in split-screen. The video-wall films have been arranged on both sides to complement, thus resulting in a 16:9 screen format.
- The multimedia installation consists of at least 4 screen projections and 8 or more plasma screens, depending on the installation venue. As an alternative to this, the cupola projection.
- The performance enhances one of the two forms above by adding live appearances by the musicians from “The Element Project” and the dance piece by Amber Steele.
- The synthesis of the arts shows the feature-length film version behind the main stage, accompanied by drums, keyboard and lead vocals, as well as the 4 films placed singly in separate positions, each of which allows for stage performances. The added screen installations and points for performance cued by the lighting director within the audience area can extend to include several thematic zones. In this case the performance shall be expanded to include artistic appearances and a picture gallery. For the remaining senses, opportunities exist to enjoy food, beverages and smoking (even in the USA).
- As a music film, the DVD is being offered in two versions. The double DVD contains the film version including multi-angle options at selected places on Disc 1: Disc 2 contains a 79-minute documentary film about the project, additional multi-angle bonus material from “track 2”, the movie-theatre trailer and “Underway”, a video clip. Besides these two DVDs, the “Complete Edition” also includes two more discs containing the four individual films, as well as the permanent multi-angle option of being able to change to another film while one film is running, yet without interrupting the music. There are settings for Dolby Digital 5.1, DTS 5.1 and Dolby Digital Stereo.

== Performances ==
The premiere in Germany was acclaimed as the coup at the film festival Filmfest Hamburg 2005. Once the individual films had been screened at various international film festivals, the complete version debuted in 2006 at the 59th Cannes Film Festival before an international film audience. Aside from the film industry, one performance subsequently constituted the “Grand Finale” at the 2006 “Festival of the Fourth Dimension” in Sophia Antipoles, the first global festival for art and technology. Following the German cinema premiere, a 15-city tour of movie theatres including live performances (18 August to 18 September 2006) ensued to accompany the film's release. For the first time in television history, the synchronised parallel broadcast of a film feature occurred simultaneously in 4 variations on 4 TV stations on June 2, 2007 (3sat, theaterkanal, ZDFinfo and ZDFdokukanal). As a cupola projection, TRIP has been a Fulldome programme feature at the Hamburg Planetarium since July 2007. After 5 shows in New York, e.g. at the Bronx Museum of the Arts, the DVD was released in the U.S.

== Critiques ==
When the film was released in Germany, discussion surrounding the feature-length film was highly controversial from a variety of viewpoints:

- Cinema (09/2006) comes to a “thumbs-up” conclusion: “A feast for the eyes for those whose thoughts stray - you look here, you look there or simply give a listen to the cool music. Films like this used to be called ‘films to get stoned to’.”
- Der Spiegel (07/08/2006), in contrast, posts its commentary on one of the video-wall films as: “Alongside several surprisingly impressive chance encounters of image and sound, the recordings of an ecstatically music-making Otto act like documents made for private pleasure which should never have been allowed to meet the public's eye.”
- Prinz (09/2006) establishes: “Surely not something for everyone's tastes, but a wonderfully unorthodox pleasure for imaginative friends of Progressive Rock.”
- Welt am Sonntag (06/08/2006) titled it a “Confusing Abundance of Impressions”, and Rolling Stone Germany (09/2006) headlined it “Righteously Psychedelic”.
- Max (09/2006) judged “... but at any rate, an ecstasy of images and sounds that leads the viewer from Haiti to the Berlin subway. Forceful.”
- ARD Tagesschau summarised the premiere at the Hamburg Planetarium on 26 July 2007 with: “What has emerged is a trip that intoxicates, even without drugs.”

== Awards ==
- Angel of Los Angeles / Silver Lake Film Festival inter alia
- Spirit Award for “playing planet” at the Brooklyn International Film Festival
- Finalist at DomeFest Chicago 2008
