= Deutsche EuroShop =

German real estate investment company

Deutsche EuroShop SE
- Type: Public
- Traded as: FWB: DEQ; SDAX
- Industry: Real estate
- Founded: 1997
- Headquarters: Hamburg, Germany
- Key people: Hans-Peter Kneip (CEO and CFO)
- Products: Investment in shopping centers
- Revenue: €270.4 million (2025)
- Total assets: €4.604 billion (end 2025)
- Number of employees: 7 (average, 2025)
- Website: www.deutsche-euroshop.de

Deutsche EuroShop SE is an internationally active German real estate investment company headquartered in Hamburg. It is the largest German investor in shopping centers, and the country's only publicly traded company to do so exclusively. Deutsche EuroShop was spun off from Deutsche Bank in 2000 and has been one of the largest real estate companies listed on the Frankfurt Stock Exchange since 2001. At the end of 2025, the firm held investments in 21 properties in Germany, Austria, Poland, the Czech Republic and Hungary.

== History ==
The company was founded on 10 October 1997, as a pure shelf company with the name TORWA Beteiligungs AG. The company's name was changed to Deutsche EuroShop AG on 21 August 2000. At that time, Deutsche Grundbesitz Management GmbH was the sole shareholder and provided the company with EUR 580 million as a capital reserve with no obligation in return, which Deutsche Grundbesitz Management GmbH, DI Deutsche Immobilien Treuhandgesellschaft and DB Immobilienfonds Kappa Dr. Rühl KG acquired the stakes in eight shopping centres. The management was operated in 2001 by ECE Projektmanagement GmbH & Co. KG.

Deutsche EuroShop has been listed on the German stock exchange since 2 January 2001, and the entire proceeds from the issue went to Deutsche Grundbesitz Management GmbH (later name change to DB Real Estate), a subsidiary of Deutsche Bank. The chairmen of the board were Knut Neuss and Jürgen Wundrack, and the chairman of the supervisory board was Helmut Ullrich. The company was run by Claus-Matthias Böge from 2003 to 2015, by Wilhelm Wellner from 2015 to 2022, and by Hans-Peter Kneip as CEO since 2022. On 15 April 2003 the company was included in the Prime Standard, and on 14 July 2003 in the SDAX. It was included in the EPRA index on 2 January 2004 and, from 20 September 2004, in the MDAX, which it had to leave on 23 September 2019. It was subsequently listed on the SDAX again. There is also a listing in the North German regional index HASPAX. On 10 November 2005 the company received approx. EUR 67 million from a capital increase. Further capital increases followed on 7 July 2009 and on 1 February and 23 November 2010, which brought the company a total of 322 million euros. In November 2012, Deutsche EuroShop generated proceeds of around EUR 167.7 million from the placement of a convertible bond and shares from a capital increase. The convertible bond was finally converted to 99.5% in November 2017, the total number of shares was 61,783,594.

Due to the COVID-19 pandemic, Deutsche EuroShop suffered loss of rent of 24.2% in the first half of 2020. The valuation of real estate assets was also devalued by an average of 5.5%.

As a result of the successful takeover by Oaktree Capital Management and CURA Vermögensverwaltung, the family office of the Otto family, Deutsche EuroShop had to leave the SDAX on 19 September 2022. The Executive Board team consisting of Wilhelm Wellner († 2022) and Olaf Borkers left the company by mutual agreement following the successful takeover bid.

On 1 October 2022, Hans-Peter Kneip took over the management of Deutsche EuroShop as sole member of the Executive Board (CEO and CFO). After the COVID-19 pandemic subsided, Deutsche EuroShop experienced a resurgence with rising customer numbers and tenant turnover. At the beginning of 2023, shares in six shopping centres were acquired and a capital increase of around EUR 315 million was implemented. Furthermore, the company increased investments in its shopping centers. As a result of the company's new direction and the increased share price, Deutsche EuroShop returned to the SDAX on 23 September 2024 and belongs once again to the largest listed companies on the Regulated market of the Frankfurt Stock Exchange.

On 28 March 2025, Deutsche EuroShop announced the reappointment of Hans-Peter Kneip to the Executive Board. On 10 April 2025, CEO Kneip presented the expansion of the Main-Taunus-Zentrum in Sulzbach near Frankfurt to include the ‘Food Garden’, a 9,000 square metre park-like catering area developed especially for the shopping centre with eight restaurants, including The ASH, L'Osteria and ALEX. On 11 June 2025, Deutsche EuroShop placed its first Green bond of EUR 500 million, which generated strong investor demand and was seven times oversubscribed. In mid-2025, Deutsche EuroShop's shopping centres were revalued slightly for the first time after years of declining property valuations.

Effective 31 July 2026, Deutsche EuroShop was converted into a European Company (Societas Europaea, SE).

== 25th anniversary on the stock exchange ==
Deutsche EuroShop celebrated its 25th anniversary on the stock exchange with the traditional bell ringing ceremony on the trading floor of the Frankfurt Stock Exchange. At this event on 29 January 2026, Hans-Peter Kneip, CEO of Deutsche EuroShop, paid tribute to the company's long-term success at the interface between real estate, retail and the capital market.

Special guests included Alexander Otto, CEO of the ECE Group, Jürgen Fitschen, former Co-CEO of Deutsche Bank, Michael Diederich, global co-head of Deutsche Bank's corporate bank and former member of the FC Bayern Munich executive board and spokesman of the UniCredit Bank executive board, Karin Dohm, member of the board of Deutsche Bahn and former deputy chair of the supervisory board of Deutsche EuroShop, Manfred Zaß, inventor of the name "DAX" and former chair of the supervisory board of Deutsche EuroShop, as well as current and former members of the executive and supervisory boards.

== Shareholder structure ==
The company's share capital is divided into 75,743,854 shares. As of December 2025, Deutsche EuroShop had over 10,000 shareholders. 77.2% are owned by Hercules BidCo GmbH, a consortium of the companies Oaktree Capital Management and CURA Vermögensverwaltung, the family office of the Otto family. The free float amounts to 16.2%.

== Corporate governance ==
=== Board ===
The company is managed by Hans-Peter Kneip as CEO and CFO.

=== Supervisory board ===
The supervisory board consists of nine members. The chairman is Peter Ballon.
