= 98.8 KISS FM Berlin =

Coordinates: 52.457233°N 13.320141°E

KISS FM 98.8
Germany
- Broadcast area: Berlin and parts of Brandenburg
- Frequencies: FM: 98.8 MHz; DAB+:7B

Programming
- Language: German
- Format: Rhythmic CHR

Ownership
- Owner: 100% Frank Otto Medienbeteiligungsgesellschaft mbH & Co. KG

History
- First air date: 1 January 1993
- Former frequencies: Cable: 98.45; DAB+: 5C (Germany, 1 August 2011–31 March 2014); 9D (North Rhine Westphalia, 29 October 2021–31 October 2022)

Links
- Website: kissfm.de

KISS FM 98.8 is a privately owned radio station broadcasting to Berlin and parts of Brandenburg on 98.8 FM MHz specialising in R&B, dance, hip hop and pop. It also broadcasts via analogue cable and via DAB+ in Berlin and Brandenburg on 97.90 MHz. Its studios are part of the medienzentrum Berlin located in the shopping center Das Schloss in the district of Steglitz. Gross advertising revenue of Kiss FM amounted to €11.2m in 2011.

== Audience reach and competitors ==
KISS FM has a technical reach of 4.2 million listeners living in Berlin and Brandenburg. Its core target group are young people living in Berlin between the ages of 14 and 29 years. Within this target group, KISS FM is third place with 23,000 listeners per hour, behind 104.6 RTL and Star FM. In the target group most important to advertisers, people aged 14–49, KISS FM is sixth place with 35,000 listeners. In total, KISS FM reaches 57,000 listeners per hour in Berlin and Brandenburg.

Its most important competitors are JAM FM, another black music station with a Rhythmic CHR format, Fritz, the public radio station for youths in Berlin and Brandenburg (operated by Rundfunk Berlin-Brandenburg), and Energy Berlin, which is part of NRJ, a Pan-European chain of youth-oriented radio stations.

== History ==
KISS FM started its broadcasts from Voltastraße in the locality of Wedding in January 1993. It was named after the New York radio station 98.7 Kiss FM which was one of the first stations to play rap music regularly, catering only to an African-American audience. The vision of the Berlin adaptation was to play "underrepresented music". The broadcasting license for KISS FM was tied to certain requirements which are still in force today. KISS FM must air a program with music and spoken word which focuses on all fields of young life in Berlin, especially vocational training, work, leisure time and youth-related problems. Furthermore, the program must be socially engaged, react to current trends and put an emphasis on the integration of minorities living in Berlin.

In its beginning, KISS FM was broadcast solely via analogue cable on 98,45 MHz, making it hard for the station to reach a significant number of listeners. On 1 August 1994, the cable frequency was switched to today's 97,90 MHz. In the same month, Kiss FM was considering to discontinue its broadcasts due to financial issues and appealed to the regional media authority MABB to assign an FM frequency to the station. After a decision by the MABB in December 1994, Kiss FM received the frequency 98.8 from BFBS on 28 February 1995.

In its first five years, KISS FM regarded itself as a DJ radio and a representative for Berlin's club scene. Its slogan at that time was "Power Music Radio". The daytime programming was formatted, offering a mix of R&B, hip hop and dance music. Typical artists heard on the station included Freundeskreis, Apollo 440, Run DMC, Janet Jackson, Robert Miles or Nas. In the nighttime, DJ shows were aired focusing on all kinds of urban & dance music genres. Among its DJs were Paul Van Dyk, Ray Cokes and DJ Tomekk. KISS FM also participated in the Love Parade and the Christopher Street Day in Berlin with its own truck.

Shortly after the commissioning of the new frequency, a quarrel flared up between the majority shareholder Frank Otto and founder Costoula Dornbach who held 24.8% of the shares. Frank Otto had to sell some of his shares due to media concentration regulations in order to become a co-partner in a news-talk radio venture. He installed a new managing director in March 1995 replacing the founder with the aim of turning KISS FM into a CHR format and thus making his shares more attractive to prospect buyers. After hefty protests by the staff, the managing director Norbert Schmidt quit his job and the threatened DJ shows were left untouched. Andreas Clausen, a former presenter and managing director from OK Radio in Hamburg, became then the new person in charge.

In 1996, KISS FM was shown for the first time in the radio audience study Media Analyse with an average of 20,000 listeners per hour, 80% of them living in West Berlin. Faced with financial shortages, KISS FM couldn't offer any major promotions with cash prizes to its listeners. Instead the station had to come up with innovative and inexpensive ideas. For instance, the morning show hosts revealed the "money hits" during a 104.6 RTL promotion and told their listeners when to call in at the competing station with the right answer.

In the meantime, founder Costoula Dornbach was squeezed out of the co-partnership with the aid of an expulsion proceeding which was approved by the court. The French radio station Europe 1 became a new shareholder and bought out the other co-partner Nikolaos Chrissidis who held 25% of the shares. These changes of the shareholder structure also meant a transition from a DJ station covering niche genres to a formatted radio station catering to a young, urban audience.

Although the personnel was able to avert this trend at first, the formatting was completed in the fall of 1998, beginning with the new period of the radio audience study. The musical focus was now solely on the ever more popular R&B and hip-hop, while electronic music was banned from the program completely. Most of the DJ shows were cancelled at this point, with the exception of "Boogie Down Berlin" with DJ Tomekk whose appearances on-air phased out around 1999, when he came to national fame with his hit single 1, 2, 3, ... Rhymes Galore. What was left from the DJ shows were two hours each weekday and five hours on the weekend with more or less generic DJ sets which were repeated many times, lacking the personality and the eclectic selection of the earlier DJ shows.

To set itself apart from other radio stations in Berlin, the new morning show tried to deliver the most outrageous contests. The best examples for this might be "Extreme Microwaving", where listeners microwaved objects like auto batteries or dead mice, or the search for "the best tits in Berlin" with a very explicit description of the breasts on-air. After receiving various rebukes by the media authority of Berlin-Brandenburg, and because the renewal of the broadcasting license was due in 2007, one could observe that future promotions on the station became far less scandalous with campaigns against truancy and youth violence in Berlin.

Despite the slight changes, the media authority decided in 2007 to renew the licence for only two years instead of the usual seven years due to the doubtful programming development. KISS FM had to guarantee the MABB that the program would be free of sexism and misogyny and that the station would clearly distance itself from violence. The Kiss FM staff also had to promise not to make sexist, discriminatory, and vulgar remarks on air.

One year earlier, in 2006, Kiss FM moved to the medienzentrum Berlin in the shopping centre Das Schloss, with the radio stations Berliner Rundfunk 91.4 and 94,3 RS2.

Since the fall of 2008, dance music was brought back to the station, and now accounts for a significant amount of the music played, while hip-hop music was drastically cut down. Artists that are being played on the station include Lady Gaga, Rihanna, Taio Cruz, David Guetta, and one-hit wonders like Stromae, Yolanda Be Cool, or Edward Maya. This development was accompanied by a new sound design and new hosts like BJ Barry, and female rappers She-Raw and Visa Vie.

Especially the "BJ Barry Show", which aired in the drive time from 2008 to 2010, stood out from the rest of the program, because of the creative freedom the host received. Contrary to the usual practice to use the drive time show as a promotion vehicle for the morning show, the "BJ Barry Show" mainly consisted of live listener calls, studio guests, and contests. Major promotions during the audience survey didn't cause any outrage anymore, shifting the focus from scandalous contests to sweepstakes related to the music being played on the station, like "Track Discoverer". Also, while still being the exception, editorial contributions in the morning show increased, showing a drastic change in content. Examples are school tours, reports on youth centres in Berlin, or a special show reminding of the fall of the Berlin wall in 1989. In the meantime, the licence for Kiss FM was extended until 2016.

In 2011, Frank Otto bought all shares (49.8%) from minority owner Europe 1 making his company the sole shareholder of Kiss FM. From 1 August 2011 to 31 March 2014, Kiss FM started airing nationwide via the new digital radio standard DAB+.

== Notable personnel ==
- Lars Schlichting, a cast member on the reality TV series The Real World: London, who deejayed for the station at the time he was featured on that show.
