= Michael Otto (businessman) =

German businessman (born 1943)

- Born: 12 April 1943 (age 83); Chełmno (Kulm), Reichsgau Danzig-West Prussia
- Education: University of Hamburg; LMU Munich
- Occupation: Former head of Otto Group
- Children: Benjamin Otto; Janina Özen-Otto
- Parent: Werner Otto (father)
- Relatives: Katharina Otto-Bernstein (sister); Frank Otto (brother); Alexander Otto (brother)

Michael Otto (born 12 April 1943) is the honorary chairman of the supervisory board of Germany's Otto Group, one of the world's largest mail order companies, with €15.6 billion in revenue in 2021.

== Life and career ==
Otto was born in 1943 in Kulm as the son of Werner Otto. In 1945, he fled with his family to Hamburg, where his father founded a mail-order shoe business in 1949, which would later become Otto Group. After an apprenticeship in banking at Merck Finck & Co in Munich, he studied economics at the University of Hamburg and LMU Munich and obtained a doctorate.

In 1971, he became a member of the executive board responsible for textile purchasing in his father's company.

In February 1981, Otto became chairman of the executive board of the Otto Group. He remained in office until October 2007 and was chairman of the supervisory board until March 2025. During his tenure, the Otto Group developed from a catalogue mail-order company into a digital retail group. In 1986, he made environmental protection a corporate objective. Measures included changes towards more environmentally compatible production, waste separation and a shift from air freight to sea transport. The group also acquired various companies including Limango, Manufactum and SportScheck, and founded companies including About You and Bonprix.

The family members were the former owners of Spiegel, Inc. (the parent company of Eddie Bauer and former owners of Spiegel catalog), which filed for bankruptcy on 17 March 2003. On 25 May 2005, Spiegel, Inc. emerged from bankruptcy, was renamed Eddie Bauer Holdings, and is now owned primarily by Commerzbank. The Otto Group no longer has any stake in the company.

Until April 2014, Otto was a member of the supervisory board of Axel Springer SE. He was also a partner in Robert Bosch Industrietreuhand KG until April 2016, which holds 93% of the voting rights in Robert Bosch GmbH. Otto is also a member of Deloitte's advisory board.

In 2011, Otto was criticised over wage dumping and precarious working conditions among parcel couriers at the group-owned subsidiary Hermes Europe. In August 2011, ARD broadcast the report Das Hermes-Prinzip: Ein Milliardär und seine Götterboten on the subject. Michael Otto and Hermes denied the existence of precarious working conditions, attributing problems to individual subcontractors. In September 2011, Hermes announced that it had ended cooperation with several subcontractors and that the Otto Group's ethical standards would in the future apply to companies and suppliers working on Otto's behalf.

The wealth of the Otto family was listed under Michael Otto's name on the Forbes 2015 billionaires list at US$15.4 billion. The family ranked 51st worldwide and seventh among German billionaires.

In April 2015, Otto announced that he would transfer his majority stake in the Otto Group, and thus much of his wealth, to a new charitable foundation. Its annual distributions were intended to support cultural, social, environmental and charitable projects while ensuring the Otto family's long-term influence over the group.

On 1 March 2025, he handed over the chairmanship of the supervisory board to his former chief executive Alexander Birken. Since 2025, he has been honorary chairman of the supervisory board.

Otto is married to Christl Otto and is the father of Janina (born 1973) and Benjamin Otto (born 1975) and lives in Hamburg, Germany.

== Honorary positions ==
To support specific projects in the field of nature conservation, Otto established the Michael Otto Stiftung für Umweltschutz (Michael Otto Foundation for Environmental Protection) in 1993, renamed Umweltstiftung Michael Otto (Environment Foundation Michael Otto) in 2018, and is chairman of its board of trustees. In 2005, he founded the Aid by Trade Foundation, which supports smallholder farmers in Africa, and chairs its board of trustees.

Otto is president and founder of Stiftung KlimaWirtschaft (formerly Stiftung 2 Grad) which promotes the transition towards a carbon-free economic system. He once stated about this transition: "Understanding climate protection as a modernisation project for the economy can now play an important role in overcoming the consequences of the Corona crisis – and at the same time help to avoid profound negative impacts of the climate crisis."

He belonged to Helmut Schmidt's Friday Society and was deputy chairman of the board of the cultural circle of German industry within the BDI.

Further honorary positions include:

- co-founder and honorary senator of the German National Foundation
- member of the board of trustees of the Helmut and Loki Schmidt Foundation
- co-founder and honorary council member of the World Future Council
- chairman of the board of trustees of the Society for Politics and Economics (Haus Rissen Hamburg)
- honorary chairman of the foundation council of WWF Germany
- member of the Club of Rome

== Awards and honours ==
For his engagement in the fields of the environment and sustainability, Otto received awards, including the German Environmental Prize in 1997 and the Sustainability Leadership Award in 2002. In 1999, the University of Hamburg awarded him honorary senatorial status, as it had previously done for his father Werner Otto in 1988. In 2000, Otto also became an honorary senator of Ernst Moritz Arndt University of Greifswald.

In 2001, he was named Manager of the Year, and in 2005 he received the Vernon A. Walters Prize of Atlantik-Brücke for promoting German-American relations. On 30 November 2006, on the proposal of Federal President Horst Köhler, he was awarded the Grand Cross of Merit with Star of the Order of Merit of the Federal Republic of Germany. In 2007, he received the German Retail Award in the Lifetime Award category. The Theodor Heuss Foundation awarded him the Theodor Heuss Prize in 2010 for a company culture regarded as exemplary in both economic and ethical terms. In 2013, the WWF named the newly described hawkweed species Pilosella ottonis, endemic to the Spessart, after him. On the occasion of his 75th birthday, Otto was invited to a Senate breakfast by Hamburg mayor Peter Tschentscher in 2018 and was granted the honorary title of professor.

=== Further honours ===
- 1982: German Marketing Prize
- 1986: Manager of the Year
- 1991: Eco-Manager of the Year
- 1998: Alexander Rüstow Plaque of the Aktionsgemeinschaft Soziale Marktwirtschaft
- 2001: Induction into the DMA Hall of Fame, New York
- 2004: Prize for Understanding and Tolerance of the Jewish Museum Berlin
- 2005: special prize of B.A.U.M. (Bundesdeutsche Arbeitskreis für Umweltbewusstes Management e. V. )
- 2006: German Founders' Prize, lifetime achievement category
- 2008: Medal for Services to Foundations
- 2012: Honorary doctorate from HHL Leipzig Graduate School of Management
- 2012: Manager Magazin Hall of Fame
- 2013: Steiger Award for commitment to the environment
- 2013: Honorary citizen of Hamburg
- 2015: Bavarian Order of Merit
- 2016: Honorary member of the Patriotic Society of 1765
- 2017: German CSR Prize
- 2017: Hans Lenz Medal for services to amateur music-making
- 2019: EWS Award of the Verein Europäischer Wirtschaftssenat
- 2019: Hamburg Citizens' Prize of the CDU for engagement in environmental protection
- 2021: Global Economy Prize of the Kiel Institute for the World Economy
- 2025: Reinhard Mohn Prize "Strengthening Democracy" of the Bertelsmann Stiftung
- 2025: Hall of Fame (Handelsblatt)

== Publications ==
- Michael Otto (ed.): Das Michael Otto Prinzip. Steidl, Göttingen, 2023, ISBN 978-3-96999-239-5.

== Films ==
- Typisch! Michael Otto: Ein Leben zwischen Bangladesch und Blankenese. Documentary film, Germany, 2018, 30 minutes. Written by Frank Sieren, produced by NDR, in the series Typisch!, first broadcast 27 September 2018.
- Die Ottos. Documentary film, Germany, 2012, 45 minutes. Written and directed by Dagmar Wittmers, produced by NDR, in the series Deutsche Dynastien, first broadcast 7 May 2012.
- Amerika war mein Jugendtraum. Documentary, Germany, 2011, 22:44 minutes. Produced by n-tv, first broadcast 21 June 2011, online video.
- Mit langem Atem. Documentary, Germany, 2008, 45 minutes. Directed by Meike Hemschemeier and Thomas Weidenbach, produced by WDR, first broadcast 23 September 2008.
- Das Hermes-Prinzip – Der Milliardär und seine Götterboten, documentary by Monika Wagener and Ralf Hötte, Germany, 45 minutes, produced by WDR, first broadcast 3 August 2011.
