= Frank Otto (media entrepreneur) =

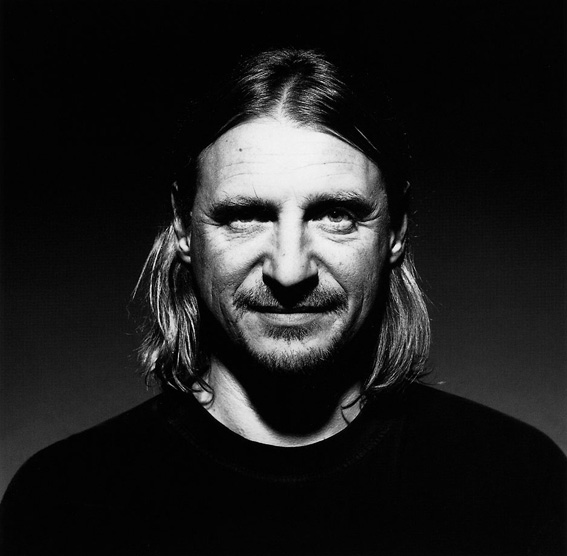
- Otto in 2004
- Born: 7 July 1957 (age 69); Hamburg, West Germany
- Education: Muthesius Academy
- Occupations: Media entrepreneur, musician
- Parent: Werner Otto
- Relatives: Michael Otto (brother); Katharina Otto-Bernstein (sister); Alexander Otto (brother)
- Website: Frank Otto Medien

Frank Otto (born 7 July 1957) is a German media entrepreneur and pioneer in the field of private radio and private television in Germany. Aside from Frank Otto Medien Beteiligungs GmbH & Co.KG, he is also involved in various radio and TV stations.

== Biography ==
Frank Otto is the second-eldest son of Werner Otto, the founder of the Otto Group. Born in Hamburg, he was trained as a restorer of paper and graphics at the Hamburg Museum of Arts and Crafts and studied Fine Art at the Muthesius Academy of Kiel. After that, he was active as a musician and music producer.

In 1987, he founded OK Radio, the second Hamburg-based private radio station (now HAMBURG ZWEI) and is the majority shareholder to this day. Together with Time Warner and Sony Television he became co-founder of the European music television channel VIVA in 1993. In 1995 he founded Hamburg 1, one of the first private regional television in Germany. Among other things, he is involved with the Schleswig-Holstein radio delta radio and Radio NORA and 98.8 KISS FM Berlin, Energy Saxony, Hamburg Zwei, NRW1 and RauteMusik.FM.

Along with Kathrin Lohmann, Frank Otto is currently one of the managing directors of Film Manufacturers GmbH, Germany. In addition, Otto scored the soundtrack for his sister's, Katharina Otto-Bernstein's award-winning film, Beautopia.

From 1999 to 2003 he was also editor of the Hamburger Morgenpost.

At the Expo 2005 in Aichi, Japan, his music and multimedia project TRIP – Remix Your Experience was presented for the first time. The first full-scale performance was given in December 2005 in the USA at Bergamot Station in California. His production company established for this purpose, ferryhouse, further developed for a music label in 2007 (Releasing The Subways, Compact Space, Wolfgang Michels, Carl Carlton, Ashley Hicklin, Gabriella Cilmi, Nick Howard, Irie Révoltés incl. Alle Farben Remix).

In the same year, he co-founded XOUNTS which became an official art-partner of the IFA before trading began. Since 2008 he has been involved in the Radio Park group. In the following spring he co-founded the Untitled – Publishing and agency. The open air theater Loreley was revived and upgraded by him and Ulrich Lautenschlager since 2010. Frank Otto lives in Hamburg's Uhlenhorst at the Alster.

== Charity ==
Since 1993 Frank Otto is an active member at the board of the Hamburger Presse Club. Around the same time his involvement in the Board of Trustees of Hamburg Leuchtfeuer began, where he also laid the foundation stone of the Leuchtfeuer Foundation in 2004.

He is co-initiator of the Beatles-Platz and in August 2008 he became co-founder of the Foundation Popkurs. As the first chairman, he is engaged with Hamburg Hoch 11. He is also a board member for the Club Foundation, the IHM community of interest Hamburg music industry and the Committee on media and creative economy of the Hamburg Chamber of Commerce.

He is a shareholder in the non-profit company Kunsthaus Hamburg, a supporter of the Palace of Culture Hamburg, ambassador of the World Future Council and a boardmember of Luca Foundation, as well as a promoter of the first hour at Reading without nuclear power - The Renewable Reading Days, millionways and Viva con Agua.

== Honors ==
2013: Order of Merit of the Federal Republic of Germany
