= Alexander Otto (businessman) =

German billionaire businessman (born 1967)

- Born: 7 July 1967 (age 58)
- Education: Harvard College; Harvard Business School
- Occupation: Businessman
- Parent(s): Werner Otto; Maren Otto
- Relatives: Katharina Otto-Bernstein (sister); Michael Otto (brother); Frank Otto (brother)

Alexander Otto (born 7 July 1967) is a German billionaire businessman. As of December 2024, Forbes estimated his net worth to be US$8.4 billion.

== Early life ==
Alexander Otto was born on 7 July 1967. He is son of Werner Otto and his third wife, Maren Otto. He earned a bachelor's degree from Harvard College, and an MBA from Harvard Business School.

== Career ==
Otto is a part-owner of Otto Group, founded by his father Werner Otto. He is the majority owner and CEO of ECE Group, a commercial property company specialising in shopping centres, which was also founded by his father. He has joined the family business in 1994.

He is also a member of the supervisory board of the Otto Group, of Deutsche EuroShop AG and of SITE Centers in Cleveland/USA.

According to the magazine Forbes his net worth is $12.1 Billion. The Otto family is consistently ranked among the wealthiest Germans.

== Personal life ==
Otto is married to Dorit Otto and lives in Hamburg, Germany.
