= About You Awards =

German social media award

- Awarded for: Influential social media personalities
- Country: Germany
- Presented by: About You
- Website: www.aboutyou-awards.de

The About You Awards (stylized as ABOUT YOU Awards) is an awards ceremony presented annually by the German online fashion retailer About You GmbH. The award ceremony honors influential social media personalities in Germany. Prizes are awarded in several categories.

The About You Awards are an element of the About You marketing strategy which is focused on social media, native advertising and cooperation with influencers.

== History ==
The awards were first held in 2017 in Hamburg and have since taken place in Munich (2018, 2019) and Cologne (2021). The process of determining the laureates of the About You Awards has changed somewhat during the three years of the award's existence, as have the categories. In 2017 and 2018, candidates in five resp. seven categories (Fashion, Beauty, Lifestyle, Fitness, Upcoming and, in 2018, YouTube and Music) were nominated by About You, and the winners were then chosen by public voting. In 2019, category winners and recipients of the honorary and special awards were chosen by a jury, following a public nomination process on social media. Besides appointing the jury, About You had convened a committee of former award nominees, winners and laudatory speakers, referred to as the "About You Awards Academy", which has assisted the jury with the selection of the winners. That year, the categories were Style, Comedy, Music, Newcomer and Health, with additional honorary awards (Empowerment and Idol of the Year) and a Special Award for Business Achievement. Internationally known awardees included model Heidi Klum (Special Award) and the Swedish climate activist Greta Thunberg (Empowerment).

The 2020 awards were postponed and later cancelled due to the COVID-19 pandemic. In 2021, nominees in five categories (Style, Business, Empowerment, Sports and Digital Art) were chosen by the "About You Awards Academy", and winners were then selected by a combination of public and jury voting. The awards ceremony was held without a live audience, again due to the COVID-19 pandemic. Awardees included the Syrian swimmer Yusra Mardini and the Italian influencer Chiara Ferragni.

== Broadcasting ==
The award show is broadcast by ProSieben, Germany's second largest privately owned television network, and streamed on About You's social media channels. According to the organizer's estimates, the 2018 About You Awards were watched by more than eight million spectators on all channels.
