= Werner Otto (entrepreneur) =

German entrepreneur

- Born: 13 August 1909; Seelow, German Empire
- Died: 21 December 2011 (aged 102); Berlin, Germany
- Occupation: Businessman
- Known for: Founder, Otto Group
- Spouses: Eva Haffner (m.1939, div. 1949) Jutta Becker (m.1952, div. ?); Maren Stücken (m. 1963)
- Children: Ingvild Goetz; Michael Otto; Frank Otto; Katharina Otto-Bernstein; Alexander Otto

Werner Otto (13 August 1909 – 21 December 2011) was a German entrepreneur. In 1949, he founded the Otto Group, which eventually became the world's largest mail order group. He was married three times and had five children.

Otto and his family consistently ranked among the wealthiest Germans.

== Early life ==
Werner Otto was born the son of the retailer Wilhelm Otto and his wife Frieda. His mother died shortly after giving birth to a daughter in 1910. He attended the school in Schwedt, later the high school in Prenzlau (Uckermark).

== Career ==
After a commercial apprenticeship, he started his own business as a retail merchant in Szczecin.

For the dissemination of leaflets, Otto was sentenced in 1934 to two years imprisonment. After his release, he operated a cigar shop and married in 1939 his first wife, Eva Haffner. In 1941, their daughter Ingvild was born and two years later son Michael. The end of the war saw Otto with a head injury in a military hospital. After the war he fled with his family from Soviet-controlled East Germany to Hamburg, which was under British control. There he founded a shoe factory in 1948, which went bankrupt a year later in 1949. In the same year he divorced. Motto for his life was "Panta rhei" — everything flows.

=== Mail order company 'Otto Versand' ===
On 17 August 1949, Otto founded the mail order company 'Otto Versand' (Otto GmbH & Co KG) in Hamburg. The first catalog had 14 pages, was hand-bound and included only shoes. In the following years the Otto Group expanded more and more. In 1981, the management of the fast-growing company was turned over to his eldest son, Michael Otto.

In 1952, Otto married Jutta Becker and 1957 his second son Frank was born, the only child from his second marriage. In the 1960s, he started the Sagitta Group, today's Park Property, one of the largest real estate companies in Canada.

Through his North American experiences, Werner Otto got the idea to found another enterprise, the ECE Projekt Management GmbH & Co. KG, which he did in 1969. The company builds and manages shopping malls; finance and staff. ECE is one of the leading developers, implementers, owners and operators of large commercial real estate in Europe.

His third wife Maren Stücken gave birth to Otto's youngest children Katharina and Alexander in the 1960s. Katherina is a filmmaker in New York. Alexander received from his father the real estate company ECE entrusted.

In his range of social causes, he founded in 1969 the Werner Otto Foundation, which supports medical research.

In 1973, when he was over 60, Otto developed the Paramount Group in New York, to invest in US real estate.

At Harvard University he donated a new museum building, the Werner Otto Hall, for the art of German Expressionism, out of the Busch-Reisinger Museum. The building has now been demolished as part of a redevelopment project led by Renzo Piano.

In 2011, he died at the age of 102 in Berlin. His widow, Inga Maren Otto, is a German art collector and philanthropist.

== Awards ==
Otto was awarded the Grand Cross 1st class of the Order of Merit of the Federal Republic of Germany, was an honorary senator of the city of Hamburg, and on his 100th birthday became an honorary citizen of the city of Berlin. Otto is included in Germany's Hall of Fame in the history museum in Bonn.
