= Stefanie Giesinger =

German model

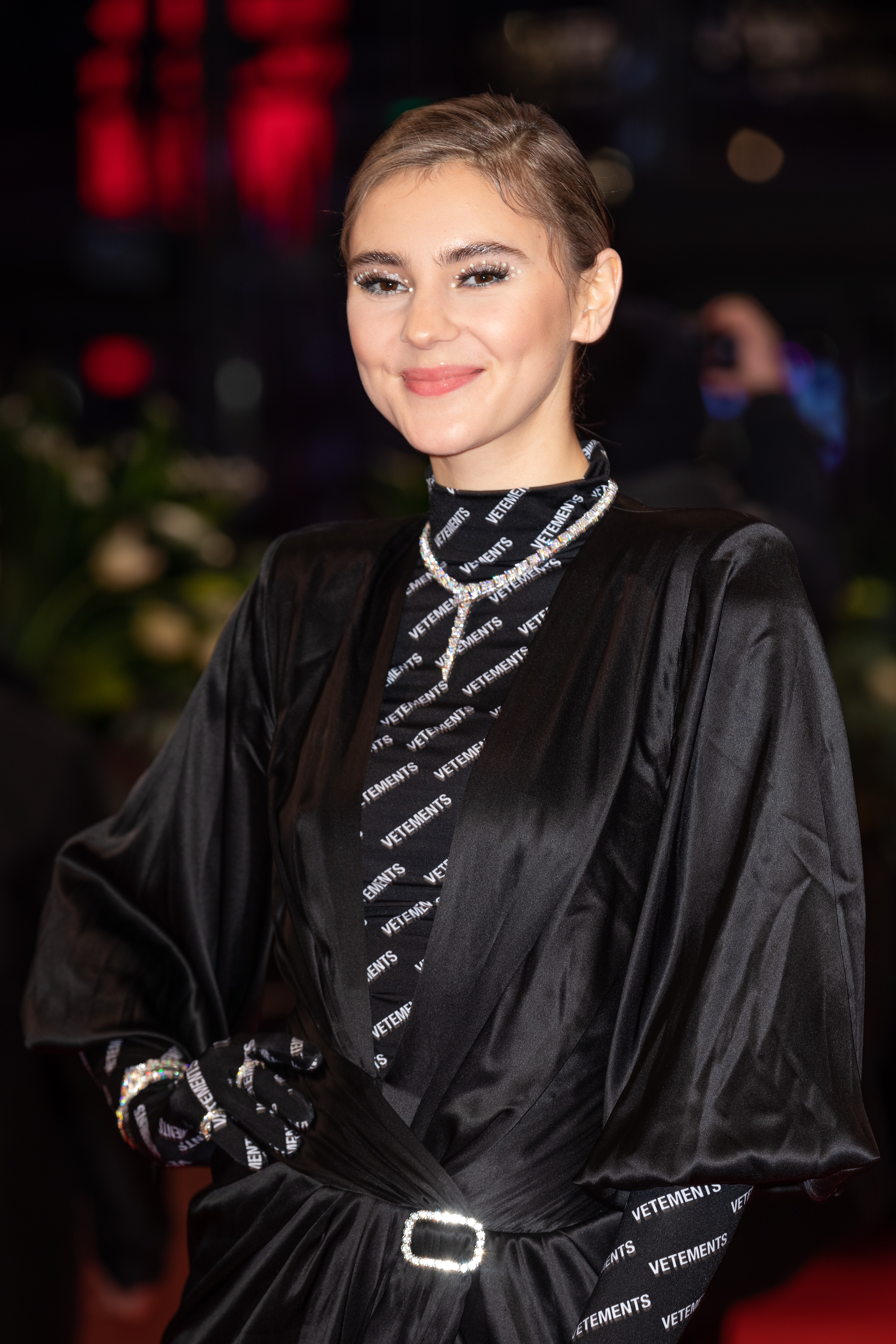
- Giesinger in 2020
- Born: 27 August 1996 (age 28); Kaiserslautern, Germany
- Occupation: Model
- Years active: 2014–present
- Modeling information
- Height: 176.53 cm (5 ft 10 in)
- Hair color: Light brown
- Eye color: Brown
- Agency: Muse Management (New York)
- Website: stefaniegiesinger.com

Stefanie Giesinger (born 27 August 1996) is a German model. She was the winner of the ninth season of the modeling-competition Germany's Next Topmodel, and was on the cover of the German Cosmopolitan in June 2014.

== Early life ==
Giesinger was born in Kaiserslautern. Her parents are ethnic German and emigrated from Siberia to Germany in 1995, a year before her birth. She has primary ciliary dyskinesia and had to undergo an emergency operation at the age of 13.

== Career ==
After winning Germany's Next Topmodel in 2014, she was signed to Günther Klum's modelling agency ONEeins. She did not extend her two-year contract. In 2014, she was cast for the movie Der Nanny, which was released in 2015. She was also cast for the music video to the song "80 Millionen" by German artist Max Giesinger (not related), and walked for Dolce & Gabbana during Milan Fashion Week 2017. In 2018, she was honoured as "Idol of the Year" at the About You Awards held by German fashion online retailer About You.

== Personal life ==
Between 2016 and 2022 she was in a relationship with the British YouTuber Marcus Butler.
