= The Last Spy =

Film about US intelligence officer Peter Sichel

- Directed by: Katharina Otto-Bernstein
- Written by: Katharina Otto-Bernstein
- Produced by: Katharina Otto-Bernstein; Oleg Dubson; Sabine Schenk; Kathrin Lohmann
- Starring: Peter Sichel
- Cinematography: James Carman
- Edited by: Matthew Cohn
- Music by: David Steinberg
- Production company: Film Manufacturers Inc.
- Distributed by: Dogwoof (United Kingdom); Menemsha Films (United States)
- Release date: June 29, 2025 (Munich Film Festival)
- Running time: 106 minutes
- Countries: Germany; United States
- Languages: English; German

The Last Spy is a 2025 German-American documentary film written and directed by Katharina Otto-Bernstein. The film centers on Peter Sichel (1922–2025), a German-born Jewish refugee who served in the Office of Strategic Services (OSS) during World War II and later became a senior officer in the Central Intelligence Agency (CIA) during the early Cold War.

Built around an extensive interview with Sichel conducted near the end of his life, the film traces his flight from Nazi Germany, wartime intelligence work, and subsequent career with the CIA in Berlin, Washington, D.C., and Hong Kong. It also examines Sichel's later criticism of American covert intervention and the personal consequences of a career built around secrecy.

The film premiered at the Munich Film Festival in June 2025 and subsequently screened at international festivals including Film Fest Gent, the Haifa International Film Festival, the Palm Springs International Film Festival, and the New York Jewish Film Festival. A shorter television version, titled Der Jahrhundert-Spion in German and L'Espion aux mille vies in French, was broadcast by Arte in 2025. Dogwoof and Menemsha Films distribute the film in the United Kingdom and United States, respectively.

The film received generally positive reviews, with critics highlighting Sichel's first-person account of the early CIA and the documentary's examination of American foreign policy during the Cold War.

== Synopsis ==
The Last Spy is structured around an extended interview with Peter Sichel. Sichel recounts his childhood in a German Jewish family, his family's flight from Nazi Germany, and his arrival in the United States as a refugee.

After joining the U.S. Army during World War II, Sichel was recruited by the Office of Strategic Services, where he worked in intelligence operations involving German prisoners of war. Following Germany's defeat, he remained in Berlin and became increasingly involved in intelligence gathering directed at the Soviet Union. He later joined the newly established CIA, becoming its station chief in Berlin before holding subsequent assignments in Washington, D.C., and Hong Kong.

Through Sichel's recollections, the film examines the development of the CIA during the early Cold War and the agency's growing involvement in covert political operations. Sichel reflects critically on U.S. interventions in countries including Iran, Guatemala, and Indonesia and on disagreements within the intelligence community over the effectiveness and consequences of such operations.

== Production ==
The Last Spy was written and directed by Katharina Otto-Bernstein and produced by Otto-Bernstein, Oleg Dubson, Sabine Schenk, and Kathrin Lohmann. The film was produced by Film Manufacturers Inc., in association with KJ Entertainment, Schenk Productions Inc., Drymen Pictures, Mass Distraction Media, and Hangtime International Pictures.

Sichel serves as the film's principal narrator. His account is supplemented by interviews with his wife and children, journalists and authors including Carl Bernstein, Stephen Kinzer, Scott Anderson, and Adam LeBor, as well as historian Peter Grose. The film also features Kartika Sukarno, daughter of Indonesian president Sukarno, and Erick Arbenz, grandson of Guatemalan president Jacobo Árbenz, providing perspectives on the consequences of U.S. intervention in their respective countries.

The film combines interview material with archival footage, photographs, home recordings, and excerpts from fictional works connected to Sichel's wartime experiences.

James Carman served as cinematographer. Matthew Cohn edited the film, with additional editing by Bernadine Colish and Joseph Ruscitto. The original score was composed by David Steinberg.

The feature-length version runs 106 minutes. A shorter, 92-minute television version was produced for German-language and French-language broadcasts.

== Release ==
The Last Spy had its world premiere at the Munich Film Festival on June 29, 2025.

Later in 2025, the film screened at Film Fest Gent and at the Haifa International Film Festival, where it had its Israeli premiere.

On November 13, 2025, the television version was presented at a public screening and discussion at the State Chancellery of Rhineland-Palatinate in Mainz as part of the SchUM Kulturtage. The event was presented by Arte/ZDF and the State Chancellery and included Otto-Bernstein, Sichel's daughter Bettina Sichel, and State Secretary Heike Raab.

The 92-minute television version, titled Der Jahrhundert-Spion in German and L'Espion aux mille vies in French, was broadcast by Arte on November 18, 2025.

In January 2026, the film had its U.S. premiere at the Palm Springs International Film Festival, where it was included in the festival's Best of Fest program. The Last Spy subsequently screened at the New York Jewish Film Festival, presented by the Jewish Museum and Film at Lincoln Center, on January 18, 2026, and continued to be shown on the U.S. festival circuit.

The film opened theatrically in the United Kingdom on April 24, 2026. The release began with screenings at Bertha DocHouse in London and was followed by screenings at JW3 and other cinemas. Dogwoof handled the UK release and international sales, while Menemsha Films acquired U.S. distribution rights.

== Reception ==
The Last Spy received generally positive reviews, with critics frequently commenting on the film's connections between Sichel's experiences during the Cold War and contemporary international politics.

Danny Leigh of the Financial Times awarded the film four out of five stars, describing it as an "absorbing film" and noting the contemporary resonance of Sichel's recollections of American intervention in Iran and other Cold War conflicts.

Allan Hunter of Screen International described the documentary as "fascinating and wide-ranging", writing that Sichel's life provided enough material "to fill a miniseries, never mind a single feature".

Reviewing the film for KPBS, Beth Accomando described it as "a fascinating film" that provides "candid insights that illuminate ongoing issues today", highlighting Sichel's criticism of the tendency of political officials to disregard intelligence that conflicts with their expectations.

Dan Carrier of the Camden New Journal gave the film four out of five stars, writing that "this extraordinary story of an extraordinary man is more than a documentary", and emphasizing the film's examination of the political uses of intelligence.

German reviews also focused on the film's historical and contemporary dimensions. Film-Rezensionen rated the film nine out of ten and described it as a "gripping tell-all tale", while Schwäbische Zeitung, covering the film at the Munich Film Festival, called it an "impressive" documentary. The Münchner Merkur described the film as offering a rare view inside American foreign intelligence.

Writing in The Jerusalem Post following the film's Israeli premiere, Hannah Brown described The Last Spy as "a fascinating look at the life of CIA spymaster Peter Sichel."
