= Jordan Barrett =

Australian model (born 1996)

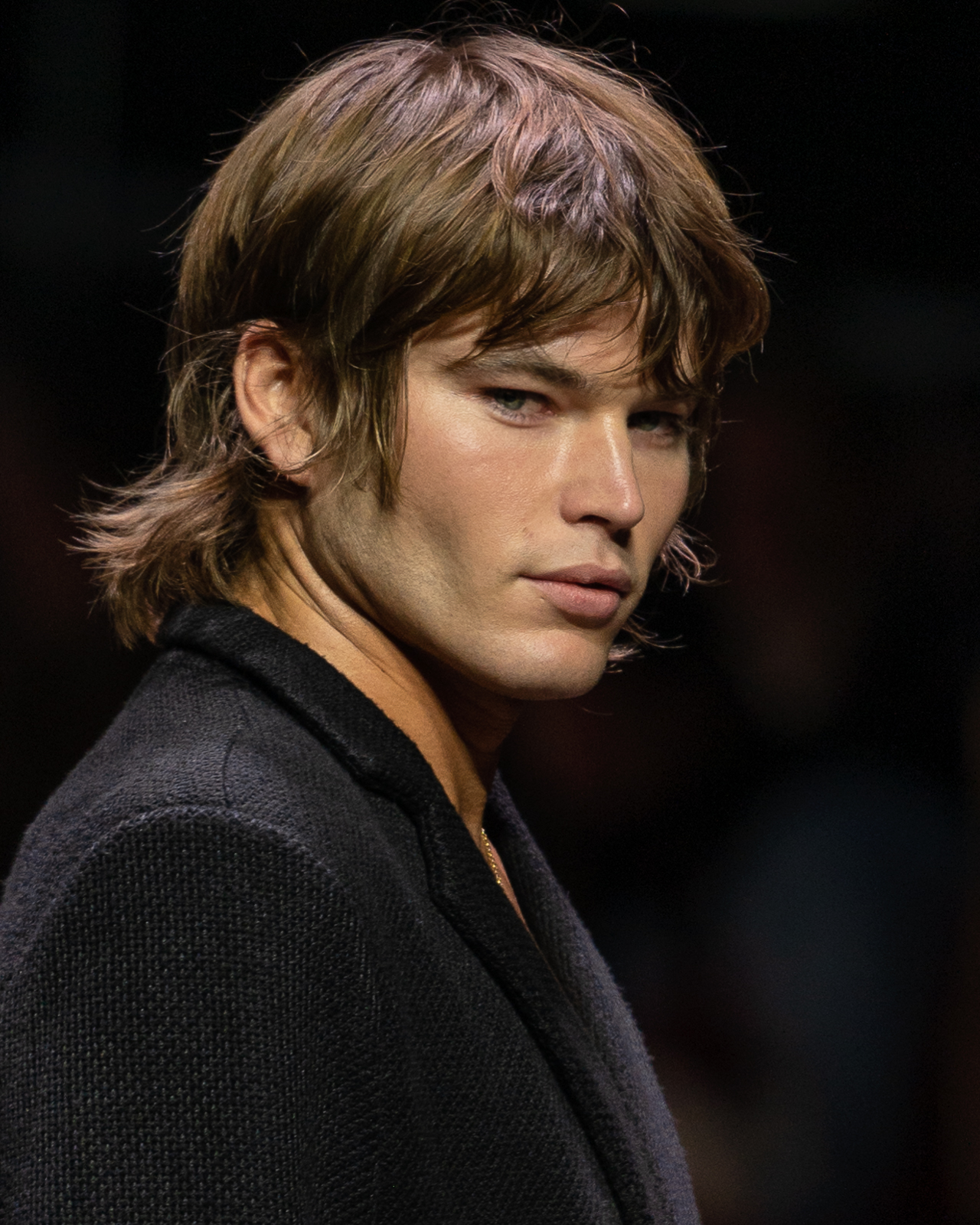
- Barrett at the Berlin Fashion Week, 2022
- Born: Jordan Kale Barrett; 2 December 1996 (age 29)
- Other name: Robert Turner
- Occupation: Fashion Supermodel
- Years active: 2010-present
- Partner: Fernando Augusto Casablancas (m. 2021)
- Modelling information
- Height: 188 cm (6 ft 2 in)
- Hair colour: Blond
- Eye colour: Green (yellow central heterochromia)
- Agency: IMG New York (New York), TESS Management (London)

Jordan Kale Barrett is an Australian supermodel.

== Career ==
Barrett was scouted when he was 14 by a model scout from IMG Australia. In September 2015, Barrett starred in an issue of VMAN magazine and Arena Homme+ SS Magazine, shot by Stephen Klein.

Barrett has featured in campaigns for Tom Ford, Balmain, Versace, Moschino as well as Coach. Barrett has featured on the covers of Vogue Netherlands Man, CR Book by Carine Roitfeld, Wonderland Magazine, 10 Magazine, Numéro Homme, and Hercules. Collier Schorr in Collaboration with Barrett created "I BLAME JORDAN Book" for Moma PS1 New York. Barrett also received the "Man Of Style" award at The GQ Awards.

== Personal life ==
In August 2021, Barrett married fellow model Fernando Augusto Casablancas in Ibiza, Spain.
