= The Price of Everything =

2018 American documentary on contemporary art

- Film poster
- Directed by: Nathaniel Kahn
- Produced by: Jennifer Blei Stockman; Debi Wisch; Carla Solomon; Lisa Remington; Kayla Malahiazar; Katharina Otto-Bernstein
- Starring: Jeff Koons; George Condo; Njideka Akunyili Crosby; Larry Poons
- Cinematography: Bob Richman
- Edited by: Sabine Krayenbühl
- Music by: Jeff Beal
- Distributed by: HBO Documentary Films
- Release date: 19 January 2018 (Sundance Film Festival)
- Running time: 98 minutes
- Country: United States
- Language: English

The Price of Everything is a 2018 American documentary film directed by Nathaniel Kahn and produced by Jennifer Blei Stockman, Debi Wisch, Carla Solomon and Katharina Otto-Bernstein for HBO.

The film features interviews with people prominently involved in contemporary art and the market for it, including; artists Jeff Koons, Larry Poons, Njideka Akunyili Crosby and Gerhard Richter, George Condo, Marilyn Minter art dealer Gavin Brown, Sotheby's executive vice president Amy Cappellazzo, auctioneer Simon de Pury, collectors Stefan Edlis and Gael Neeson and Inga Rubenstein, and art critic Jerry Saltz.

First released at the Sundance Film Festival, the film's first post-Sundance premier was at the True/False Film Festival in Columbia, Missouri.

The film takes its title from a quote from the 1892 Oscar Wilde play Lady Windermere's Fan delivered on screen by art collector Stefan Edlis: "There are a lot of people who know the price of everything and the value of nothing".

== Awards ==
| Year | Award | Category | Result | Ref |
|---|---|---|---|---|
| 2018 | Sundance Film Festival | U.S. Documentary Competition (Grand Jury Prize) | Nominated | |
| 2019 | News and Documentary Emmy Awards | Outstanding Arts & Culture Documentary | Nominated | |

== See also ==
- The Lost Leonardo, 2021 documentary film about the most expensive art sale in history
