= Peter Sichel =

German-American wine merchant (1922–2025)

- Portrait as a private in the U.S. Army, 1942
- Born: Peter Max Ferdinand Sichel; September 12, 1922; Mainz, Hesse, Germany
- Died: February 24, 2025 (aged 102); New York City, U.S.
- Occupations: Wine merchant, author
- Children: 3 (1 deceased)

Peter M. F. Sichel (September 12, 1922 – February 24, 2025) was a German-American wine merchant and operative of the U.S. secret services, who popularized the Blue Nun wine brand, (for a while the largest international wine brand in the world). Prior to this he ran the CIA's operations in Berlin and later in Hong Kong during the early stages of the Cold War.

== Biography ==
=== Early life ===
Sichel was born in Mainz, Germany, in September 1922, to a Jewish family, where his grandfather's family wine business, H. Sichel Söhne, had been established in 1857. He was educated in Germany and then, in 1935, was sent to be educated in England. He attended St Cyprian's School and Stowe School. While he was at school in England, his parents escaped from Nazi Germany on a ruse, and the family settled in France. The firm had offices in London and Bordeaux, and at the start of World War II, while he was apprenticed to the Bordeaux firm, he was interned as he was German.

=== Service with the CIA ===
Sichel escaped to the USA via France and Spain and joined the US Army a week after the bombing of Pearl Harbor. He was recruited by the US Office of Strategic Services, running agents in Germany for which he was given the Distinguished Intelligence Medal. Sichel's unit utilized the novel approach of employing German POWs to infiltrate Germany from the Western front on the basis that anti-Nazi German POW would both be reliable and could easily explain their being missing from their units amidst the chaos of German military retreats.

During this time Jack Hemingway, son of renowned author of Ernest Hemingway was sent to the front to assist Sichel's infiltration operations. Jack Hemingway would be captured during this time, and Sichel would later say "Jack was the most beautiful, dumbest man I have ever met." Shortly after the War, he was sent to Berlin to head the secret Strategic Services Unit. He reported in early 1946 on the methods the Soviets were using to control the political parties in the Soviet sector of Germany (which became East Germany).

He moved back to Washington in 1954 to head the German and eastern European desk, where he was involved in the establishment of Radio Free Europe, and oversaw the Operation Gold tunnel into East Berlin to tap underground Soviet telephone lines.

Sichel continued to work for the Central Intelligence Agency in Berlin, Washington and Hong Kong until 1960, when he left, saying "I left because the CIA did things I didn't like, such as send people into the Ukraine to work in fabricated resistance groups. They were potentially being sent to their deaths. I made a huge fuss."

Viewed as a vocal internal critic, in the late 1950s he had been investigated by the FBI under suspicion of having communist sympathies.

In a documentary about Sichel released after his death, The Last Spy by filmmaker Katharina Otto-Bernstein, Sichel criticised U.S. governments for deposing democratically elected leaders in Guatemala, Indonesia, Congo and Iran.

=== Wine entrepreneur ===
He took over the family wine business in Germany but made his principal residence New York City, where the family also had an import business, which he dissolved, instead appointing Schieffelin, then a large drinks company, U.S. importer of his family's wines. At this time, wine was taking off as a drink in America, overtaking fortified wine, and he worked with Schieffelin to develop Blue Nun, one of the wines in his family's portfolio, as a wine you can drink "right through the meal", using widespread advertising. At its peak in the 1980s, annual sales in the US reached 1.25 million cases and 3 million cases worldwide.

Sichel often appeared on television in Germany as a witness to the immediate post-war years in Berlin when he was head of the CIA in Berlin, and wrote several books on German wine and a guide to wine. In 1995, the Sichel company was sold to another German company, Langguth. Peter also helped arranged sale of part of the Schieffelin company to LVMH. He helped to found the German Wine Society, the Society of Wine Educators and to bring the Commanderie de Bordeaux to the US. He received the Distinguished Service Award from the Wine Spectator in 1989. He was president of the International Wine and Spirit Competition in 1991. Until 2006, he was a principal shareholder of Bordeaux Château Fourcas-Hosten in Listrac, which he sold to members of the Hermès family.

The Blue Nun Wine brand is referenced in popular culture by band Beastie Boys, as a track from their third album Check Your Head.

=== Personal life and death ===
Sichel was the father of the late filmmaker Alex Sichel and the screenwriter Sylvia Sichel, both best known for the 1997 teen drama All Over Me. His other daughter Bettina is a partner in a California winery, Laurel Glen Vineyard. He turned 100 in September 2022.

Peter Sichel died on February 24, 2025, at the age of 102.

== Publications ==
- Peter M.F. Sichel and Judy Ley, Which Wine: The Wine Drinker's Buying Guide, 1975, ISBN 0-06-013867-X
- Peter M.F. Sichel, The Wines of Germany: Completely Revised Edition of Frank Schoonmaker's Classic, 1980, ISBN 0-8038-8100-2
- Peter Sichel, On Wine: How to Select and Serve: Vol 1, audio recording, Columbia Special Products (CSP 151).
- Peter M.F. Sichel, The Secrets of My Life, 2016, ISBN 978-1-4808-2406-5
