= Katharina Otto-Bernstein =

German-American filmmaker and producer

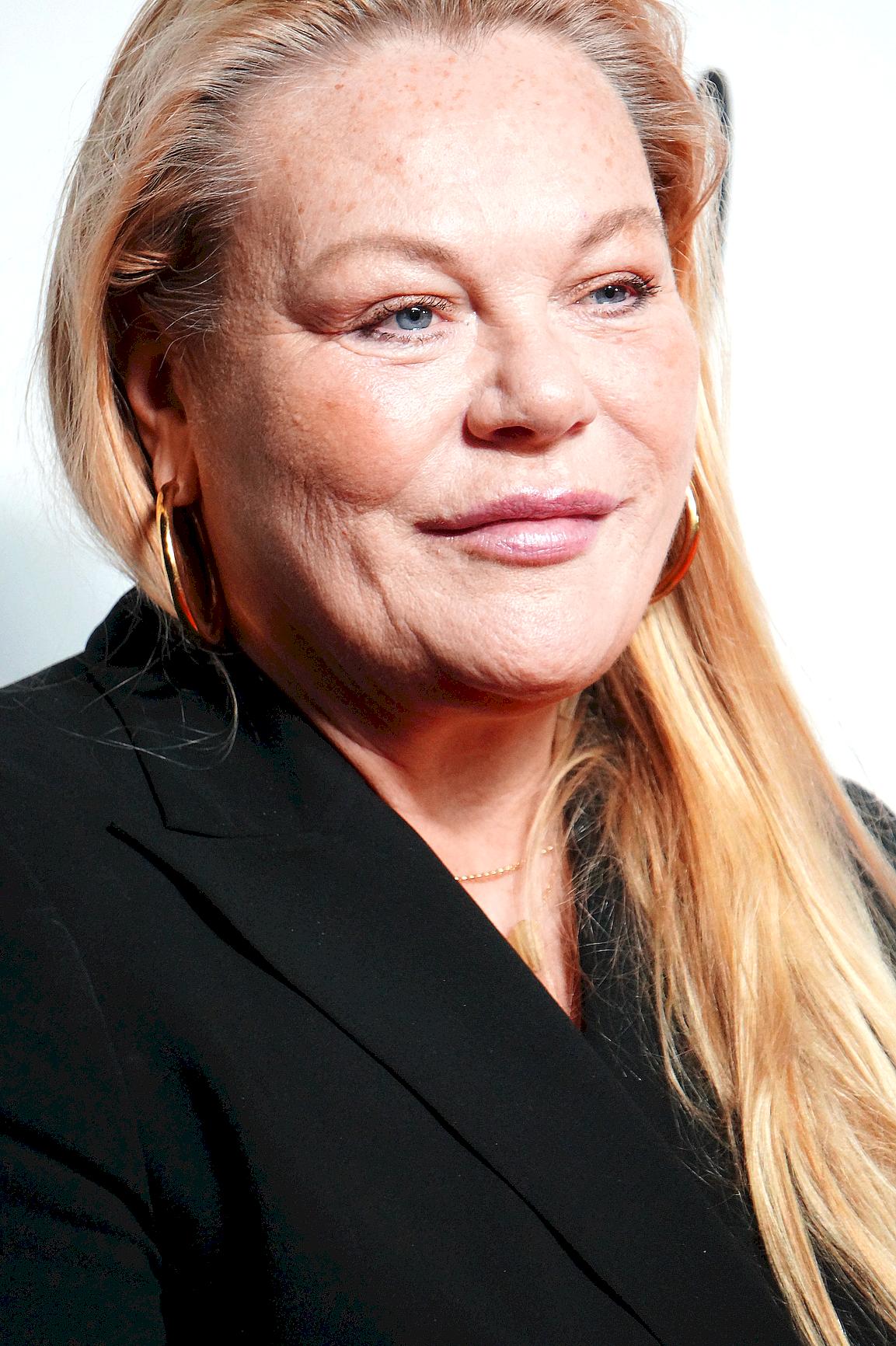
- Otto-Bernstein in 2025
- Born: Katharina Otto; Hamburg, Germany
- Education: Columbia University (BA, MFA)
- Occupations: Filmmaker; producer
- Parent: Werner Otto (father)
- Relatives: Michael Otto (brother); Frank Otto (brother); Alexander Otto (brother)

Katharina Otto-Bernstein is a German-American filmmaker and producer. She has directed and produced films including The Last Spy, Oh, Canada, Joyland, The Price of Everything, Mapplethorpe: Look at the Pictures, Absolute Wilson, When Night Falls Over Moscow, The Need for Speed: Bicycle Messengers in New York, and Beautopia. She is the author of Absolute Wilson—The Biography of theater director Robert Wilson and has worked as dramaturge in theater and dance (Karole Armitage's Fables on Global Warming).

== Early life and education ==
Otto-Bernstein (née Otto) was born in Hamburg, Germany. She attended St. Clare's Hall in Oxford, England. She later earned a bachelor's degree and an MFA in Film from Columbia University School of the Arts.

== Career ==
As an undergraduate, Otto-Bernstein worked for Town & Country and wrote a lifestyle column for German Vogue. In 1989, while enrolled in the Columbia University graduate film program, she was hired by British director Don Boyd (Aria, Twenty-One, My Kingdom) to work on an East-West thriller. When the production crew arrived in Berlin, Otto-Bernstein witnessed the fall of the Berlin Wall, and the unification of East and West Germany. This event led her to direct the television documentary Coming Home (1990), which focuses on the reunification of German families. She also compiled the interview collection In the Shadow of the Wall, which featured interviews with East German personalities, including intelligence agents Günter Guillaume and Ruth Kuczynski (aka Red Sonja).

After returning to the US, Otto-Bernstein directed the comedy The Second Greatest Story Ever Told (1992), starring Mira Sorvino and Malcolm McDowell; the television documentary The Need for Speed: Bicycle Messengers in New York (1993); and the American segments of the documentaries When Night Falls Over Moscow - Arms Dealing in the Former Soviet Union and The Industrialists Hall of Fame (1993).

Otto-Bernstein's Beautopia premiered at the Sundance Film Festival in 1998. The film explores the modeling industry and features fashion figures such as Claudia Schiffer, Kate Moss, Cindy Crawford, Naomi Campbell, Karl Lagerfeld, and Calvin Klein. Beautopia was nominated for the Grand Prize at Sundance and won the Silver Hugo award at the Chicago International Film Festival. Janet Maslin of The New York Times described the film as "a terrific and lively feminist analysis".

In 1998, Otto-Bernstein met American theatre and opera director Robert Wilson (Einstein on the Beach, Black Rider, Lohengrin) at a cocktail party. This meeting led to a seven-year collaboration on the biopic Absolute Wilson. The film features collaborators such as Philip Glass, David Byrne, Tom Waits, Jessye Norman, and Susan Sontag in one of her last interviews. Absolute Wilson premiered at the 2006 Berlin International Film Festival and was shown at various international festivals, earning the Art Film of the Year award from Art Basel. Kirk Honeycutt of The Hollywood Reporter wrote that "An artist who operates on such a ground-breaking, international level as Robert Wilson deserves a documentary as good as Absolute Wilson." A. O. Scott of The New York Times noted that "Absolute Wilson makes you wish you had been there. Ms. Otto-Bernstein has performed heroic work.". HBO distributed the film in North America and Studio Canal in Europe.

In 2006, Otto-Bernstein published Absolute Wilson: The Biography (Prestel, Random House). She also wrote the chapter "Absolute Watermill" for the book Robert Wilson: The Watermill Center: A Laboratory for Performance (2012, Daco-Verlag, Stuttgart). Additionally, her short story "Dog Days" appeared in No Better Friend: Celebrities and the Dogs They Love, a collection of essays edited by Elke Gazzara.

In 2013, Otto-Bernstein was dramaturge on choreographer Karole Armitage's ballet Fables for Global Warming. (Armitage was nominated for a Tony Award for the musical Hair.)

In 2016, Otto-Bernstein directed and produced Mapplethorpe: Look at the Pictures, a feature-length portrait of the American artist Robert Mapplethorpe. This film premiered at the Sundance Film Festival and the Berlin International Film Festival. The film was released theatrically worldwide and premiered on HBO on April 4, 2016. Mapplethorpe: Look at the Pictures received nominations for two Emmy Awards, two Critics' Choice Movie Awards, a Cinema Eye Honors Award, a Realscreen Award, a GLAAD Media Award, and a Grierson Award.

In 2018, Otto-Bernstein was an executive producer on The Price of Everything, a documentary examining the role of art in a consumer-based society. The film premiered at the Sundance Film Festival and was released theatrically in October, followed by a TV premiere on HBO.

In 2019, Otto-Bernstein co-produced the Amazon Prime TV Series Für Umme.

In 2021, Otto-Bernstein co-produced the narrative feature Maalsund, starring Ulrich Tukur and Sibel Kekilli, for Westdeutscher Rundfunk.

In 2023, Otto-Bernstein was a producer on Joyland. Initially banned in its home country, Pakistan, for its LGBTQ+ themes, the film premiered at the Cannes Film Festival in 2023 where it won the Un Certain Regard Jury Prize and Queer Palm. It was later Shortlisted as Best International Feature at the 96th Academy Awards and won the Independent Spirit Award for Best International Film in 2023.

In 2024, Otto-Bernstein was an executive producer on Oh, Canada, which premiered at Cannes, and played at the New York Film Festival and Toronto International Film Festival.,

In 2025, Otto-Bernstein wrote, directed and produced the documentary feature film "The Last Spy", a riveting biography of 102-year-old CIA spymaster Peter Sichel. The "fascinating" and "eye opening" film had its world premiere at the Munich Film Festival. The same year, Otto-Bernstein was also an executive producer on Gus Van Sant's "Dead Man's Wire" which will world premiere at the 82nd Venice International Film Festival. She was also an executive producer on "A Sad and Beautiful World", which premiered at Giornate Degli Autori.

She is currently at work on a feature documentary "A Test of Civilization", which examines the only intergovernmental effort to save German and Austrian Jews following Nazi Germany's annexation of Austria in 1938.

Otto-Bernstein is a founder of Film Manufacturers Inc., a production company with offices in New York City and Munich, that develops, produces, and co-produces fiction and non-fiction entertainment.

== Personal life ==
Otto-Bernstein is married to New York art dealer Nathan A. Bernstein, with whom she has two children. She is the chair of the Columbia University School of the Arts Dean's Council.

== Works ==
- "A Test of Civilization" (2028) - Writer, Director, Producer
- "Dead Man's Wire" (2025) - Executive Producer
- "A Sad and Beautiful World" (2025) - Executive Producer
- "The Last Spy' (2025) - Writer, director, producer
- "Oh, Canada" (2024) - Executive Producer
- "Joyland" (2023) - Producer
- "The Price of Everything" (2018) - Executive Producer
- Mapplethorpe: Look at the Pictures (2016) - Producer
- Fables for Global Warming (2013). Armitage Gone! Dance. Choreography by Karole Armitage - Dramaturge
- No Better Friend: Celebrities and the Dogs They Love (2013), ISBN 0762783745, Edited by Elke Gazzara - Writer
- Robert Wilson: The Watermill Center: A Laboratory for Performance - (2012), ISBN 9783871350542 - Writer
- Absolute Wilson: The Biography (2006), ISBN 9783791334509 - Writer
- Absolute Wilson (2006) - Writer, director, producer
- Beautopia (1998) - Writer, director, producer
- When Night Falls Over Moscow (1994) - Writer, director
- The Second Greatest Story Ever Told (1994) - Director, producer
- Industrialists Hall of Fame (1993) - Writer, director
- The Need For Speed (1993) - Writer, director, producer
- Coming Home (1990) - Writer, director
- Teething with Anger (1989) - Actress

== Selected awards and honors ==
- Mapplethorpe: Look at the Pictures (2016) - Nominee for Primetime Emmy Award, Cinema Eye Award, Critics Choice Award, The Grierson Award and GLAAD Media Award
- Columbia University Alumni Medal of Achievement (2009)
- Absolute Wilson (2006), Winner of Art Film of the Year Award, Art Basel, Nominee for Best Documentary, Warsaw International. Film Festival
- Beautopia (1998) – Winner, Best Documentary, Chicago International Film Festival, 1998., Grand Prize Nominee, Sundance Film Festival
