= About You (company) =

German online retailer

About You Holding AG
- Type: Subsidiary (AG)
- Industry: E-commerce
- Founded: 2014; 12 years ago
- Founder: Tarek Müller; Sebastian Betz; Hannes Wiese
- Headquarters: Hamburg, Germany
- Area served: 25 countries in Europe
- Revenue: ▲€2.44 billion (2025)
- Operating income: ▼ –€63 million (2025)
- Net income: ▼ –€115 million (2025)
- Total assets: ▼€1.12 billion (2025)
- Total equity: ▼€592 million (2025)
- Number of employees: 1,482 (2025)
- Parent: Zalando
- Website: www.aboutyou.com

About You Holding AG (stylized as ABOUT YOU) is a German fashion online retailer headquartered in Hamburg. Founded in 2014 as a subsidiary of the Otto Group, it grew rapidly to become Hamburg’s first unicorn startup company in 2018. The company operates as a major e-commerce platform across 25 European countries, focusing on personalization and influencer marketing.

In July 2025, Zalando SE acquired a controlling stake in the company, subsequently securing over 90% of the share capital. Following the acquisition, the company delisted from the Frankfurt Stock Exchange and became a subsidiary of the Zalando Group. While About You maintains a distinct brand identity, its logistics and IT infrastructure have been integrated into Zalando's broader operations. The company continues to sell private label products, including the fashion brand Edited.

== History ==
About You was launched in Germany on May 5, 2014. The company emerged from Collins (an allusion to American management expert Jim Collins and his book "Built to last"), an e-commerce project financed and overseen by the Otto Group, which invested a three-digit million amount in the project. Founders and managers were Benjamin Otto, Tarek Müller, Sebastian Betz und Hannes Wiese. Benjamin Otto is the son of Otto Group chairman Michael Otto; he left Collins in 2015 to become managing partner at the Otto Group. Hannes Wiese was the former head of the Otto Group's strategy department, while Betz and Müller were independent entrepreneurs whose former companies were acquired by the Otto Group. Before starting Collins, Tarek Müller had already attained some prominence in Germany as a young serial entrepreneur, having developed his first income-generating website at the age of 13.

About You webshops were launched in Austria and Switzerland (2015), the Netherlands and Belgium (2017), Poland and the Czech Republic (2018), Hungary, Slovakia and Romania (2019), Slovenia, Estonia, Latvia, Lithuania and Croatia (2020).

In 2016, the investment firms SevenVentures, a subsidiary of the German media company ProSiebenSat.1 Media, and German Media Pool bought a minority stake in the company. Three years after its founding, the investors valued About You at more than 300 million euros. In July 2018, the Danish company Heartland A/S, parent of the Bestseller clothing company, acquired a 29 % stake in About You. In this context, About You was valued at over one billion dollars, making the online retailer the first Hamburg-based unicorn. Otto, though still owning the largest share of the company, now held less than 50%, and About You was deconsolidated.

Since November 2017, About You has offered its e-commerce infrastructure (software for webshops), an in-house development, under the name "About You Cloud" and later, since the end of 2021 under the name of "SCAYLE - Your Commerce Engine", as a licensed product to other online retailers. On August 18, 2023, Scayle was established as a distinct wholly-owned subsidiary of About You SE, formally separating the parent company's B2B operations. The spin-off aimed to market the proprietary e-commerce infrastructure as a standalone Software-as-a-Service (SaaS) product for third-party retailers.

On December 11, 2024, Zalando announced its intention to acquire 100% of About You. On January 20, 2025, Zalando made a public takeover offer; not subject to any minimum acceptance threshold. The transaction was completed on July 11, 2025. As part of the acquisition, Zalando increased its stake to 91.45% of About You shares.

== Corporate affairs ==
The key trends for About You are (as at the financial year ending February 28):

	Revenue (€m)	Net profit (€m)	Number of orders (m)	Average order value (Note: incl. VAT) (€)
2018	283	–115		
2019	461	–114		
2020	743	–79.8		
2021	1.166	–59.9	23.2	57.1
2022	1.731	–124	32.9	57.8
2023	1.904	–229	39.4	54.8
2024	1.935	–113	37.8	58.0
2025	2.442	–115	22.6	58.7

== Expansion ==
After starting in Germany, About You was exported to several European countries. They started with countries neighboring Germany and then exported to various countries in Europe. From 2017, the expansion was made to significantly more countries. It is available in 25 countries.

Country	Launch
Germany	05/05/14
Austria	07/08/14
Switzerland	26/08/15
Belgium	10/10/17
Netherlands	10/10/17
Poland	08/08/18
Czech Republic	10/10/18
Slovakia	03/06/19
Hungary	07/09/19
Romania	01/10/19
Slovenia	19/05/20
Estonia	03/06/20
Latvia	03/06/20
Lithuania	03/06/20
France	04/08/20
Croatia	08/09/20
Bulgaria	20/10/20
Denmark	10/11/20
Finland	10/11/20
Sweden	10/11/20
Spain	23/03/21
Italy	14/09/21
Greece	28/09/21
Portugal	26/10/21
Luxembourg	19/09/2023
Cyprus	no official launch date
Ireland	exit country

== Business and marketing specifics ==
About You has implemented a cross-channel marketing approach with the smartphone app as its most important sales channel, generating 75 percent of the company's revenue. The About You shop currently (2020) offers more than 400,000 articles from over 2000 brands. There have been a number of exclusive collection deals, e.g. a limited Disney collection and a Nike collection in 2019. The shop's target customer base are women and men between the ages of 18 and 49, but it has also started (in 2019) selling children's clothes.

The retailer's own brand Edited is sold via the webshop of the same name and by more than 100 retail partners in Germany, the Netherlands, Belgium, Switzerland, Austria, Denmark and the Czech Republic.

=== Influencer marketing ===
The company cooperates with more than 100 local influencers (2019), many of whom feature in themed photo collections on the shop's home page presenting fashion styles they have chosen from the shop's product range. Select influencers get to develop their own collections. Among the prominent cooperators are Stefanie Giesinger and Lena Gercke.

=== Personalization ===
About You's shop's logo changes from "About You" to "About <customer's name>" after login. The webshop and the app generate personalized feeds and tailored product suggestions for customers based on former purchases, likes of brands, people and product groups and purchase probabilities of people with similar profiles. In 2017, About You has been described as having "the technological edge in terms of personalization" over Zalando and other German online retailers.

=== Events and TV ===
Since 2017, About You organizes the About You Awards, a yearly award show that honors popular influencers. The show is broadcast on TV by ProSieben, Germany's second largest privately owned television network.

Starting on April 20, 2019, an afternoon TV-Show named "All About You – das Fashion Duell", with the company as official title sponsor, has run for ten episodes, also on ProSieben. It was succeeded by "Style your Star – It's About You", another sponsored afternoon format, running from June 29 till August 31, 2019.

In 2019, About You has also started a collaboration with the organizers of a beach music festival, Pangea, which was re-branded as the "About You Pangea Festival".

== Awards ==
About You has been awarded the Internet World Business B2B trade journal's Shop Award for the best German online shops for four consecutive years from 2015 to 2018. In 2017, the company won the EHI Retail Institute's Retail Technology Award in the category "Best Customer Experience".

In 2019, the "About You Cloud" (the proprietary webshop infrastructure software that the company licenses to other online retailers) has received the "Deutscher Exzellenzpreis" ("German Excellence Award") in the category "Cloudservices".
