= From Ashes to New discography =

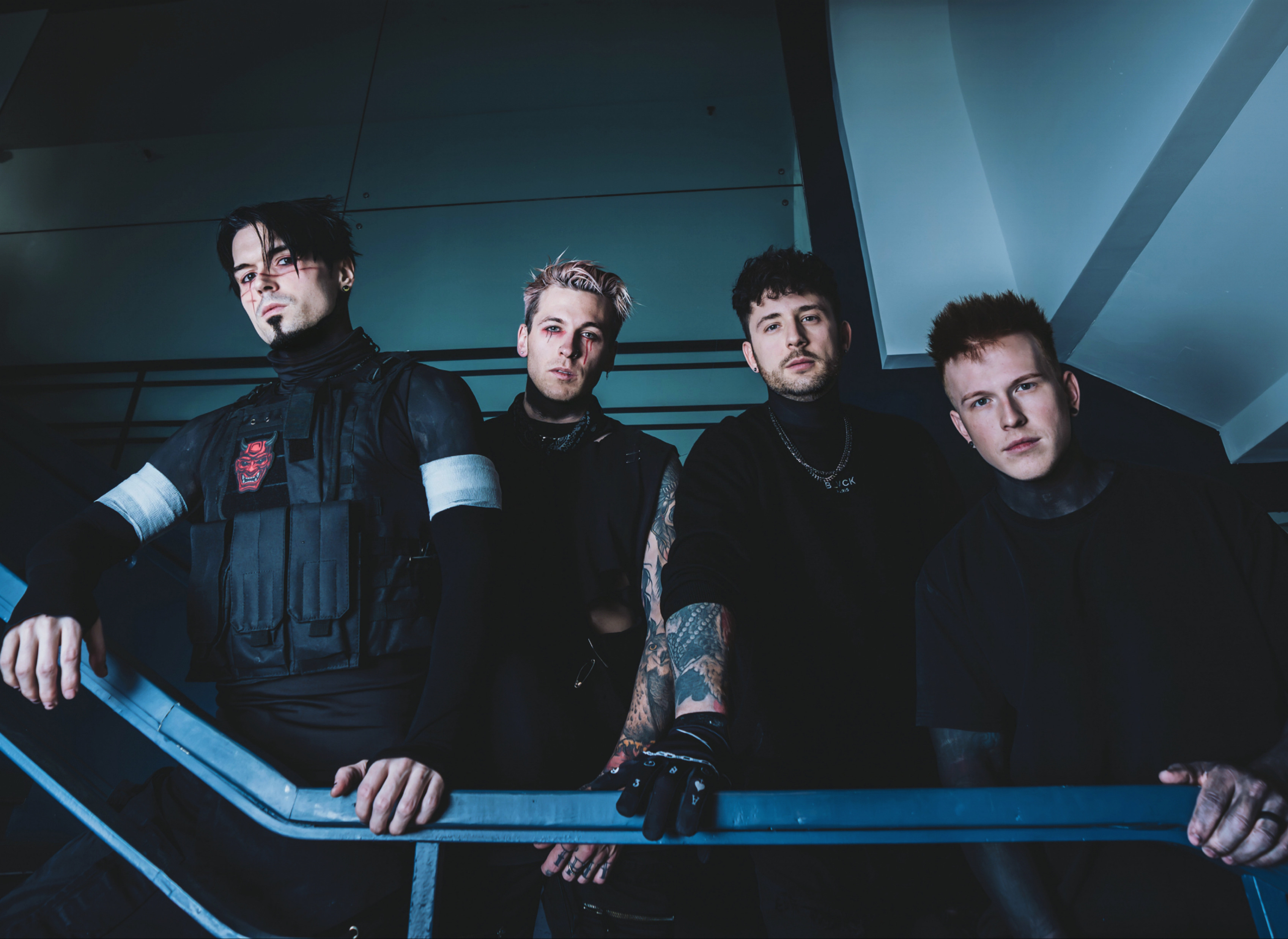
- From Ashes to New in 2024
- Studio albums: 5
- EPs: 5
- Singles: 35
- Music videos: 29

American rock band From Ashes to New have released five studio albums, five extended plays, 35 singles, and 29 music videos.

== Studio albums ==
List of studio albums, with selected details and peak chart positions
Title	Details	Peak chart positions						
Title	Details	US	US Alt.	US Hard	US Indie	US Rock	SWI	UK Rock
Day One	Released: February 26, 2016; Label: Eleven Seven; Formats: CD, digital download	53	4	2	5	6	—	—
The Future	Released: April 20, 2018; Label: Eleven Seven; Formats: CD, digital download, vinyl	163	18	14	10	38	—	—
Panic	Released: August 28, 2020; Label: Better Noise; Formats: CD, digital download, vinyl	— (Note: "Panic" did not enter the US Billboard Hot 200, but peaked at number 69 on the US Top Album Sales chart.)	—	23	—	—	—	— (Note: "Panic" did not enter the UK Rock & Metal Albums Chart, but peaked at number 68 on the UK Albums Downloads Chart.)
Blackout	Released: July 28, 2023; Label: Better Noise; Formats: CD, digital download, vinyl	—	—	—	—	—	98	31
Reflections	Released: April 17, 2026; Label: Better Noise; Formats: CD, digital download, vinyl	—	—	—	—	—	—	— (Note: "Reflections" did not enter the UK Rock & Metal Albums Chart, but peaked at number 29 on the UK Albums Downloads Chart.)

== Extended plays ==
- From Ashes to New (2013)
- Downfall (EP) (2015)
- Quarantine Chronicles, Vol. 1 (2021)
- Quarantine Chronicles, Vol. 2 (2021)
- Quarantine Chronicles, Vol. 3 (2021)

== Singles ==
=== As lead artist ===
List of singles as lead artist, with selected chart positions, showing year released and album name
Title	Year	Peak chart positions					Album
Title	Year	US Air.	US Main.	US Rock	US Hard Rock	FIN Air.	Album
"My Fight"	2013	—	—	—	—	—	From Ashes to New EP
"I Will Show You"	2014	—	—	—	—	—	From Ashes to New EP
"Downfall"	2015	—	—	—	—	—	Day One
"Through It All"	2015	34	6	41	— (Note: While failing to make the Hard Rock chart, "Through It All" peaked at number 11 on its digital sales component chart.)	—	Day One
"Same Old Story"	2016	—	—	—	—	—	Day One
"Lost and Alone"	2016	—	24	—	—	—	Day One
"The Last Time" (featuring Deuce)	2016	—	—	—	—	—	Day One
"Breaking Now"	2016	—	30	—	—	—	Day One
"Crazy"	2018	23	3	45	—	—	The Future
"My Name"	2018	—	—	—	—	—	The Future
"Finally See"	2018	—	—	—	—	—	Non-album singles
"Broken"	2018	37	12	—	—	—	The Future
"Make Everything Ok"	2018	—	—	—	—	—	Non-album singles
"Light It Up"	2018	—	—	—	—	—	Non-album singles
"The Future"	2018	—	—	—	—	—	The Future
"Pray for Me"	2018	—	—	—	—	—	Non-album singles
"Panic"	2020	38	11	—	13	—	Panic
"What I Get"	2020	—	—	—	—	—	Panic
"Bulletproof"	2020	—	—	—	—	—	Panic
"Scars That I'm Hiding" (original or featuring Anders Fridén)	2020	41	16	—	—	61	Panic
"Heartache"	2022	—	—	—	21	—	Blackout
"Until We Break" (featuring Matty Mullins)	2022	—	—	—	— (Note: While failing to make the Hard Rock chart, "Until We Break" reached number 23 on its digital component chart.)	—	Blackout
"Hate Me Too"	2023	22	8	—	—	—	Blackout
"Nightmare"	2023	27	4	—	18	—	Blackout
"Armageddon"	2023	—	—	—	—	—	Blackout
"Thriller" (with No Resolve)	2023	—	—	—	—	—	Non-album singles
"Barely Breathing" (original or featuring Chrissy Costanza)	2024	20	2	—	11	—	Blackout
"One Foot in the Grave" (featuring Aaron Pauley)	2024	—	—	—	— (Note: While failing to make the Hard Rock chart, "One Foot in the Grave" peaked at number eight on its digital sales component chart.)	—	Blackout
"New Disease"	2025	—	—	—	—	—	Reflections
"Drag Me"	2025	17	1	—	16	—	Reflections
"Villain"	2026	—	—	—	25	—	Reflections
"Die for You" (original or featuring Neoni)	2026	12	1	—	5	—	Reflections
"—" denotes a recording that did not chart or was not released in that territory.

=== As featured artist ===
List of singles as featured artist, with selected chart positions, showing year released and album name
Title	Year	Peak chart positions		Album
Title	Year	US Air.	US Main.	Album
"Yuve Yuve Yu" (The Hu featuring From Ashes to New)	2019	25	4	The Gereg
"The Retaliators (21 Bullets)" (The Retaliators featuring Asking Alexandria, Mötley Crüe, Ice Nine Kills and From Ashes to New)	2022	47	15	The Retaliators
"XOXO" (Blind Channel featuring From Ashes to New)	2024	—	—	Exit Emotions
"Adrenaline" (Excision and Sullivan King featuring From Ashes to New)	2025	—	—	Raise the Dead EP
"—" denotes a recording that did not chart or was not released in that territory.

== Music videos ==
List of music videos, showing year released and directors names
Title	Year	Director	Album
"Stay This Way"	2013	David B. Godin	From Ashes to New EP
"Through It All"	2015	Jim Foster	Day One
"Lost and Alone"	2016	Unknown	Day One
"Breaking Now"	2016	Orie McGinness	Day One
"Lost and Alone" (Alternative Version)	2017	Jim Foster	Day One
"Crazy"	2018	Raul Gonzo	The Future
"Broken"	2018	Patrick Tohill	The Future
"My Name"	2019	Josh Adams	The Future
"Every Second" (featuring Eva Under Fire)	2019	Robyn August	Non-album single
"Panic"	2020	Josiah Moore	Panic
"Scars That I'm Hiding" (featuring Anders Fridén)	2020	Unknown	Panic
"Bulletproof"	2020	Unknown	Panic
"Light Up the Sky"	2021	Clint Tustin	Quarantine Chronicles Vol. 2
"Wait For Me" (featuring Trevor McNevan)	2021	JosiahX	Quarantine Chronicles Vol. 3
"Heartache"	2022	JosiahX	Blackout
"Until We Break" (featuring Matty Mullins)	2022	Eric DiCarlo	Blackout
"Nightmare"	2023	JosiahX	Blackout
"Hate Me Too"	2023	JosiahX	Blackout
"Hate Me Too" (Alternative Version)	2023	Michael Lombardi	Blackout
"Armageddon"	2023	Eric DiCarlo	Blackout
"Monster in Me"	2023	Jensen Noen	Blackout
"Thriller"	2023	Drake Whelton	Non-album singles
"Barely Breathing" (featuring Chrissy Costanza)	2024	JosiahX	Blackout
"One Foot In the Grave" (featuring Aaron Pauley)	2024	JosiahX	Blackout
"Live Before I'm Dead (Hours)"	2024	JosiahX	Blackout
"New Disease"	2025	JosiahX	Reflections
"Villain"	2026	Matt Brandyberry	Reflections
"Die for You"	2026	Orie McGinness	Reflections
"Forever"	2026	Orie McGinness	Reflections
"Love Me"	2026	Unknown	Reflections
