= Fashion activism =

Using fashion as a medium for social and environmental change

Fashion activism is the practice of using fashion as a medium for social, political, and environmental change. The term has been used recurringly in the works of designers and scholars Lynda Grose, Kate Fletcher, Mathilda Tham, Kirsi Niinimäki, Anja-Lisa Hirscher, Zoe Romano, and Orsola de Castro, as they refer to systemic social and political change through the means of fashion. It is also a term used by some fashion designers, one being Stella McCartney. The spectacle of fashion activism as street protest has also been a theme in Paris Catwalk shows. The term is used by Céline Semaan, co-founder of the Slow Factory Foundation.

According to Google Ngram Viewer, the term's popularity takes off in the 1990s, even though signaling activism through the means of dress has been practiced much longer. In his book Dress-codes (2021), legal scholar Richard Thompson Ford stated that clothing has been designed and used with political intentions throughout the ages, and the documented evidence stretches at least back to the renaissance in the Western world.

As with other forms of activism, the aim is to promote, impede, direct, or intervene into social arrangements of dress to lay claim to a certain political agenda as well as influence systemic change within the fashion industry. It merges popular styles of dress, from clothing and shoes, to headwear and accessories, with efforts to implement social and political change beyond the designated channels of influence offered by the local political system, such as voting.

The field of fashion activism spans practices across the boundaries of fashion commodities and the fashion system, to activate members of the public to take action in contested issues. That is, the activism includes awareness raising and civic mobilization, as well as behavior change and pushes for environmental as much as socio-political and systemic impact.

Fashion activism can be used as a form of protest, whether expressing dissent or support. The term, however, can suffer from being imprecise as much dressed forms of dissent clash with both the term "fashion" and "activism." For example, the use of traditional ethnic dress as a protest against "progressive" politics (or colonialism, or Universal Human Rights, or feminism) may not be seen as "fashion." Likewise, the discarding of such traditional ethnic dress items in favor of dress with western connotations (such as pants) may not be "fashion" either, yet a powerful form of expressing political dissent. Another ambiguous element of the term concerns cause and effect; for example, if wearing short skirts cause women's liberation, or if it is the effect of a liberation already having happened through other, more powerful, political means.

== Examples of everyday fashion activism ==
Fashion activism can take place on catwalks and in art galleries, but the use of the term connotes garments donned in everyday life. Everyday examples of fashion activism in Western societies range from apparel with peace sign symbols that were popularized in the late 20th century, the use of military dress as anti-war activism amongst the hippies in the 1960s, the 'Make America Great Again' hats sported by Donald Trump supporters throughout and following the 2016 presidential campaign, and the controversial use of Hawaii shirts amongst proponents of the "Boogaloo" movement.

=== 'Loud' vs 'quiet' activism ===
Charles J. Thompson states that fashion activism becomes especially visible in clashing opposites, such as where the red 'Make America Great Again' hats and the knitted 'Pussyhats' act as clashing socio-cultural markers of opposing political views. These two opposing hats could be an example of protest-driven and explicitly political forms of dressed activism. Other scholars have put emphasis on forms of fashion activism that highlights reflection, repair, self-care, and reconciliation, through the means of dress - what they call 'quiet activism'. This type of non-confrontational and constructive activism resonates with the general approach of craftivism, and the works of Sarah P. Corbett.

Paul Neary, designer of the Melt the ICE Hat, stated that "Not everybody is built for the front line. Not everybody is built to shout"

=== Global tensions ===
It is common to claim fashion activism as a Western phenomenon, even though it may take its most apparent form in expressing global tensions. Especially women's dress is heavily policed in countries such as Afghanistan, Iran, Saudi Arabia and Sudan, to name a few, and also in the US people have been brought to court for their choices of dress. Franz Fanon and Homi K. Bhabha wrote that clothes are used to negotiate and resist occupation or colonial forces of assimilation as a form of hybridity. By wearing traditional dress populations challenge the formation of loyal colonial subjects. Wearing symbols of opposing sides in global conflicts is also a popular form of fashion activism, such as ethnic or religious insignia and army patches. Another example can be the Russian gymnast Ivan Kuliak who taped the letter “Z” to the front of his outfit in 2022 in support of the Russian invasion of Ukraine.

=== Slow factory ===
Beyond the use amongst designers promoting sustainability and user engagement, the term has also more recently been re-coined by designer Céline Semaan in her work with the NYC-based fashion lab Slow Factory. In this context, items in her collections have been used as means of fashion activism; a 'Dignity Key' necklace with which people can show support for displaced Middle Eastern refugees, a 'Banned' scarf showing the universal impact of President Trump's Muslim ban, and a '1st Amendment Flight Jacket' collaboration with ACLU, featuring the First Amendment text is written in Arabic, standing up to the rise in islamophobia in the United States and hate crimes against American Muslims.

== Fashion design items that influenced socio-political events ==
Popular items of clothing often comment on political events. Examples range from renaissance rebellion against sumptuary laws to the dresses of the courts commenting on current wars, to dress items part of women's and trans liberation in the 20th century.

=== Bloomers ===
The Bloomers, a garment suggesting unrestricted movement as opposed to the constructed figures of the Victorian age, were made popular by women's rights activists in the 1850s. They suggested a comfortable alternative to the constricting dresses worn by Western women at the time. Taking their name from their best-known advocate, the women's rights activist Amelia Bloomer, they also came to symbolize the wider suffragette movement and dress reform.

=== The mini skirt ===
The mini skirt made its debut in 1964 and quickly became a bastion of youth culture and defiance. Mary Quant, the London-based designer responsible for the skirt, sought to reflect an era that was “arrogant, aggressive, and sexy.” Accordingly, the mini skirt was a popular choice for independent and progressive women in the 1960s. During the violent protests and events of May 1968 in France, the mini skirt became a symbol of female revolution and defiance. Andre Courrèges popularized the hemline in France. While the nostalgia of the 1970s saw a return to more conventional hemlines, the mini skirt persists as a symbol of women's rights and sexual liberation to this day.

=== The slogan T-shirt ===
The slogan T-shirt has been favored by activists since its inception. Fueled by the DIY ethos of the punk era, Vivienne Westwood's subversive t-shirt designs brought the slogan aesthetic into the mainstream in the 1970s. In 1979, designer Katharine Hamnett launched a label and line of shirts driven by the concept of ‘right livelihood;’ the shirt slogans were based on the central messages of Buddhism. The T-shirts were “designed to be seminal, to make people think, and then hopefully act,” Hamnett said in an interview. In recent years, slogan tees have become a staple in popular culture, from runways to stadiums. British designer Daniel W. Fletcher organized an anti-Brexit sit-in with protesters wearing “stay” shirts and hoodies. Many prominent designers and labels such as Dior, Public School, Everlane, and Slow Factory have produced slogans supporting women's rights, gay rights, immigrants, refugees, and conservation efforts.

=== The Keffiyeh ===
The Keffiyeh is a traditional black and white scarf worn around the head or neck. According to design critic Hala Malak, the Keffiyeh dates back to pre-Islamic Sumer. High priests would wear turbans and fishing nets when praying for prosperous fishing seasons; the integration of these two textiles eventually led to the classic fishnet pattern the Keffiyeh is known for. Following the 1936 Arab Revolt, the Keffiyeh became a symbol of political uprising and rebellion. It was not until the rise of Arafat in the 1960s that the scarf came to symbolize Palestinian solidarity. The scarf has appeared among many leftist groups and anti-war organizations. The scarf was used as a fashion accessory in Balenciaga's F/W 2007 show. The Keffiyeh is a fashion staple in the west, although few are aware of its rich political history. Today, the Kaflab Foundation works with artists and designers to explore and destigmatize Arab heritage and identity through the Keffiyeh.

=== Serpica Naro ===
Serpica Naro was an activist brand set up by Milan-based chain-worker activists in 2005. Its mission was to infiltrate the Milan Fashion Week to stage a protest over labor conditions in the fashion industry. By setting up a brand, utilizing made-up Japanese street credibility, the activists managed to convince the organizers of the fashion week the brand was legit and got a show booked on the official schedule. On the catwalk, the activists used garments to perform critiques of the working conditions across the fashion economy.

== See also ==
- Environmental impact of fashion
- Sustainable fashion
