= Don't panic =

Don't panic or do not panic, may refer to:

== Books ==
- "Don't Panic" (The Hitchhiker's Guide to the Galaxy), a catchphrase from The Hitchhiker's Guide to the Galaxy by Douglas Adams
- Don't Panic: The Official Hitchhiker's Guide to the Galaxy Companion, a 1988 book by Neil Gaiman

== Film and television ==
- "Don't panic!", a catchphrase of Lance-Corporal Jack Jones from the British TV series Dad's Army
- Don't Panic (film), a 1987 English-language Mexican supernatural horror film
- "Don't Panic!", the English title for a Spanish language 1988 film originally named "El secreto de la ouija"; see Juan Ignacio Aranda
- Don't Panic TV, an Italian pornographic channel that caused outcry in South Africa
- Don't Panic — The Truth about Population, a 2013 television documentary

== Music ==
- Don't Panic (All Time Low album), 2012
- Don't Panic (Section Boyz album), a 2015 mixtape and song by Section Boyz
- "Don't Panic" (Coldplay song), a 2001 song
- "Don't Panic" (French Montana song), a 2014 song
- "Don't Panic", a song by Ellie Goulding from her 2015 album Delirium
- "Don't Panic", a song by Lena from her 2012 album Stardust
- "Do Not Panic", a song by Shinedown off their 2022 album Planet Zero

== Other ==
- Don't Panic! (Brand), LGBTQ clothing company
- Don't Panic (S42), the SpaceX Starship spaceship used on Starship flight 15

== See also ==
- Don't (disambiguation)
- Panic (disambiguation)
- The dictionary definition of don't at Wiktionary
- The dictionary definition of panic at Wiktionary
