= Sarah Corbett =

Sarah Corbett is the name of:

- Sarah Corbett (poet), British poet
- Sarah Corbett (activist), British crafts activist
