= I Don't =

I Don't may refer to:

- "I Don't" (Mariah Carey song)
- "I Don't" (Danielle Peck song)
- "I Don't", a song by Survivor from the album Reach

== See also ==
- Don't (disambiguation)
