= Mathilda Hamilton =

Swedish missionary and entrepreneur

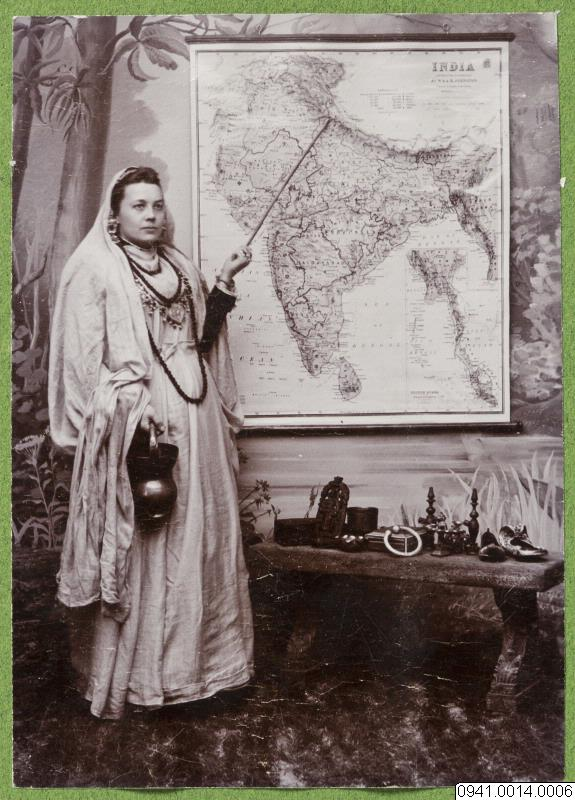
Mathilda Hamilton

Mathilda Strömberg Hamilton born Mathilda Christina Strömberg (1864–1935) was a pioneering Swedish female missionary and entrepreneur. Together with her husband, a Swedish cleric whom she met in the United States, she travelled extensively, especially to India. On their return to Sweden, in 1901 Mathilda Hamilton opened a shop where she sold Indian crafts to support the missionary work. After a few years, her business was so profitable that she became a millionaire. She bought goods in many other countries to enhance her sales in Sweden, using the takings to run vocational schools in India. Her Indiska Utställningen (Indian Exhibition) shop in central Stockholm was behind today's numerous Indiska shops in Scandinavia.

== Biography ==
Born in Finspång, Östergötland, on 19 August 1864, Mathilda Christina Stömberg was the daughter of Gustaf Strömberg (1832–1898), a master mason, and his wife Johanna Sofia née Lindholm (1843–1926). An only child, she was brought up in a well-to-do working-class home where she was privately tutored. Despite the existing difficulties for women to earn their own living, in 1888 aged 24 she travelled alone to the United States determined to become a missionary. While a student at Carleton College in Northfield, Minnesota, she interrupted her studies to go on a lecture tour where she spoke on sobriety and mission work. At one of her lectures, she met the Swedish pastor, Gustaf Adolf Nilsson (1865–1933). They married and changed their surname to Hamilton.

They joined the Scandinavian Alliance Mission (SAM) founded by Fredrik Franson. Under his leadership, they travelled to Harsil, a small town in the north of India where they hoped to establish a mission. As a result of the difficulties they experienced there and only sporadic support from SAM, Mathilda Hamilton decided to return to Sweden. But impressed with the fine Indian handicrafts she had discovered, she decided to arrange for them to be sold in Sweden.

Her shop Indiska Utställningen in central Stockholm was opened in 1901 turned out to be a highly profitable attraction. As a result, Hamilton soon became a millionaire and was able to travel abroad to countries including Turkey, Syria, Spain, Morocco and Palestine where she acquired an even wider variety of goods for her shop. These included porcelain, embroidered silks and tiger skins. In 1902, she published Kvinnan i Brahmas, Buddhas och Muhameds Länder to draw attention to the problems of women around the world.

Hamilton's plans to open a trading company in India for importing goods from Sweden were less successful, suffering from the outbreak of the First World War in 1914. She returned to Sweden where further business plans were impeded by her increasingly poor health. Mathilda Hamilton died on 14 February 1935 in a care home in Lidingö.
