= Don't Panic! (brand) =

American LGBTQ Fashion Brand

- Country: United States
- Previous owners: Skyler Thomas Hynes
- Registered as a trademark in: USPTO Serial # 74255196 (lapsed) Australia application # 591192 (lapsed)
- Website: dontpanic.com

Don't Panic Designs, Inc. was an American fashion brand founded in Los Angeles by Skyler Thomas Hynes. The trademark attributed to Don't Panic! was active in the United States from 1992 to 2003. The brand primarily sold T-shirts with humorous slogans and designs focused on LGBTQ culture and activism, politics, and current events. Early in its development, actress Liza Minnelli ordered a shirt from Hynes reading "Don't Panic!" which inspired the brands name.

Skyler Thomas Hynes wearing a Don't Panic! T-shirt.

== History ==
Hynes first found success at the 1990 Los Angeles Gay Pride Parade selling DIY screen-printed "NOBODY KNOWS I'M GAY" T-shirts. He steadily expanded the Don't Panic! product line to include mugs, stickers, accessories, and more. The brand participated in trade shows, ran a mail-order catalog, and eventually expanded into retail. Throughout its lifetime, the brand had storefronts in Miami, Provincetown, West Hollywood, New York City, San Francisco, Sydney, and London.

Street view of a Don't Panic! retail location.

Don't Panic! catalog Page

== Impact ==
Don't Panic! was active during the AIDS crisis and collaborated with the nonprofit AIDS research organization amfAR: "A glass Christmas tree ornament with an AIDS awareness ribbon dangling inside is a bestseller; a portion of the proceeds from its sales (nearly $200,000 to date) goes to Americans for AIDS Research (AmFAR)."

The Wearing Gay History archive, which includes over 4,500 LGBTQ T-shirts, Includes multiple Don't Panic! items. In the book Wearing History: T-shirts from the Gay Rights Movement, Steve Gdula writes about the brand's impact, stating "By [...] turning a taboo into something mundane, the creators of the “Don’t Panic!” Line of T-shirts, hats, stickers, and coffee mugs were helping their fellow GLBT community members increase their visibility and hopefully diffuse bigotry at the same time."

Person in Don't Panic! "Nobody Knows I'm a Drag Queen" T-shirt.

== See also ==
- Don't panic (disambiguation)
- Portal:LGBTQ
- AIDS crisis
- Political T-shirt
- Fashion activism
- Bernie Farber, Canadian activist who wore a "NOBODY KNOWS I'M GAY" T-shirt at the 2009 Toronto pride parade, resulting in controversy.
