= Panic (disambiguation) =

Panic is a sudden, overwhelming fear.

Panic may also refer to:

== Psychology and sociology ==
- Mass hysteria, the manifestation of the same or similar hysterical symptoms by more than one person
- Moral panic
- Panic attack, clinical diagnosis

== Arts and entertainment ==
=== Films ===
- Panic (1928 film), a German film directed by Harry Piel
- Panic (1946 film), also known as Panique, 1946 French film by Julien Duvivier
- Panic (1963 film), a British crime film
- Panic (1977 film), also known as Panique, 1977 Canadian film by Jean-Claude Lord
- Panic (1983 film), an Italian-Spanish film directed by Tonino Ricci
- Panic (2000 film), a film starring William H. Macy
- PANICS, a 2005 machinima film

=== Music ===
==== Performers ====
- Black Flag (band), originally named Panic, a punk rock group
- The Panics, a rock band from Australia
- A common abbreviation for Panic! at the Disco, an alternative rock band from the United States
- Panic, rock band formed in 1981, the first band of Dave Mustaine, later of Metallica and Megadeth
- Panic, a Korean ballad duo fronted by Lee Juck

==== Albums ====
- The Panics (EP 1), a 2002 EP by The Panics
- The Panics (EP 2), a 2002 EP by The Panics
- Panic (MxPx album), a 2005 album by MxPx
- Panic (Circle album), a 2007 album by the Finnish rock band Circle
- Panic (Caravan Palace album), a 2012 Caravan Palace album
- Panic (From Ashes to New album), a 2020 album by From Ashes to New

==== Songs ====
- "Panic", a song by Anthrax from the 1984 album Fistful of Metal
- "Panic/Tainted Love", a 1985 single by Coil, from the album Scatology
- "Panic" (The Smiths song), a 1986 song by The Smiths
- "Panic" (Birtwistle), 1995 concertante by Harrison Birtwistle
- "Panic", a song by No Doubt from the 2003 album Everything in Time
- "Panic", a song by Backstreet Boys from the 2007 album Unbreakable
- "Panic", a song by Therapy? from Never Apologize Never Explain, 2004
- "Panic" (Sublime with Rome song), a 2011 song by Sublime with Rome from Yours Truly
- "Panic" (From Ashes to New song), a 2020 song by From Ashes to New

=== Other arts and entertainment ===
- Panic (play), a 1935 play by Archibald MacLeish
- Panic (comics), a 1950s EC Comic
- Panic! (video game), a 1993 video game for Sega CD
- Panic (novel), a 2005 thriller by Jeff Abbott
- Panic: The Story of Modern Financial Insanity, a non-fiction book by Michael Lewis
- "Panic" (Dead Zone), an episode of the TV series Dead Zone
- Panic (TV series), a teen drama television series
- Panic! (TV series), a 1950s TV anthology series
- Panic, a character in the Disney film Hercules (1997) and the associated TV series

== Computing ==
- Kernel panic, a fatal error condition associated with Unix-like computer operating systems
- Panic, a 1992 PC demo by Future Crew

== Economics ==
- Bank run, when a large number of bank customers withdraw their deposits because they believe the bank is, or might become, insolvent
- Financial crisis, a variety of situations in which some financial institutions or assets suddenly lose a large part of their value

== Organizations ==
- Panic Inc., an American Mac software and video game company based in Portland, Oregon.
- PANIC (Prevent AIDS Now Initiative Committee), the activist group behind the 1986 initiative statute California Proposition 64 (1986)

== People ==
- Panić, an ethnic Serbian surname
- Horst Panic (1938–2025), Polish football player and manager

== Places ==
- Panic, Pennsylvania, a community in the United States
- Panic, a village in Hereclean Commune, Sălaj County, Romania
