= Craftivism =

Form of activism centered on practices of craft

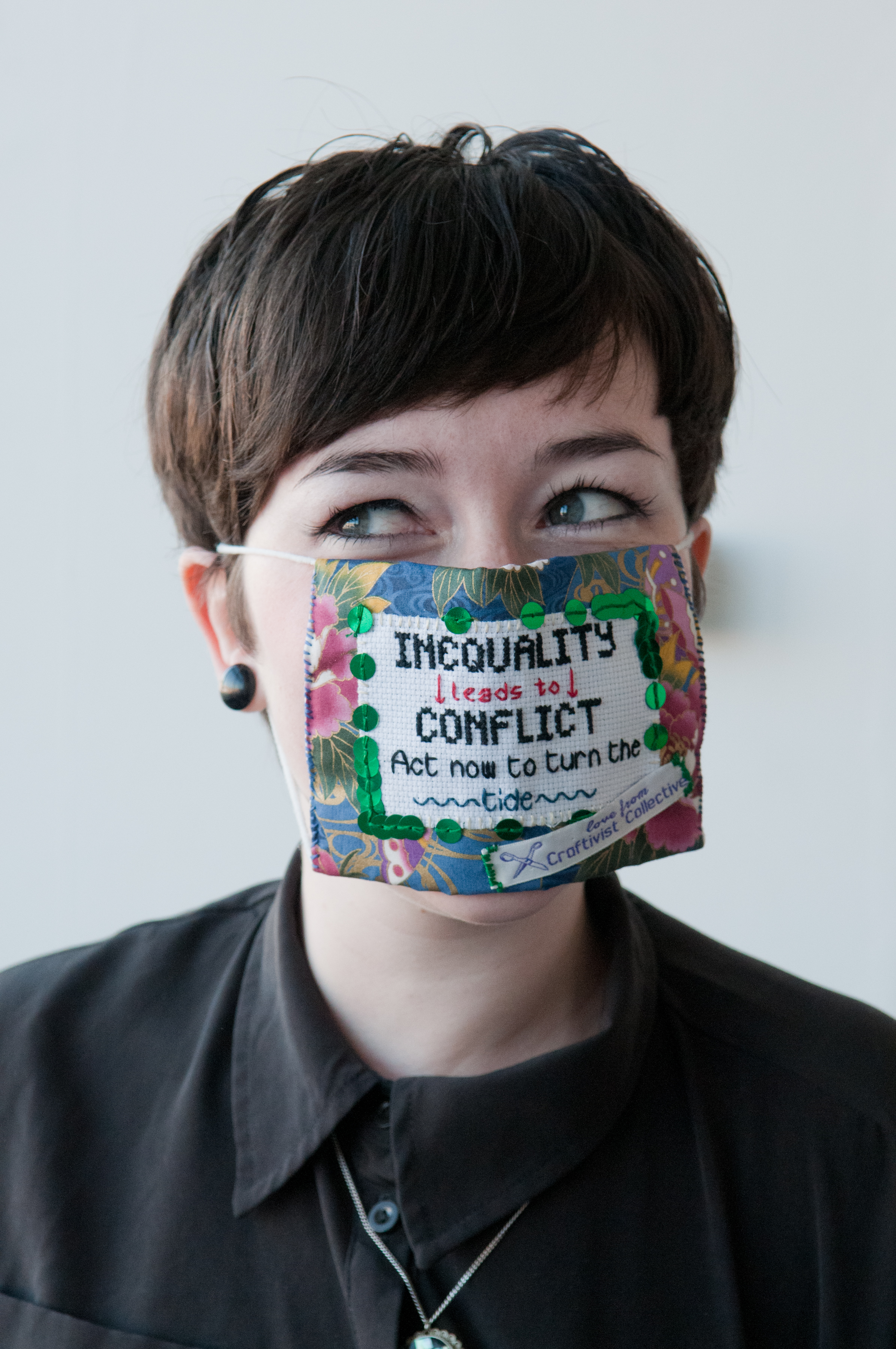
A woman wearing a craftivist facemask.

Craftivism is a contemporary form of activism that uses craft as its primary mode for political and social engagement. Craftivism is not tied to any single ideology, incorporating themes of anti-capitalism, environmentalism, solidarity, third-wave feminism, and other related movements. Much of the practice draws on techniques historically classified as the domestic arts, inclusive of sewing, quilting, embroidery, and other forms of handwork traditionally associated with home and women's labor. Craftivism is defined by the repurposing of these practices as tools for social expression, political commentary and collective action.

Craftivism includes, but is not limited to, various forms of needlework including yarn-bombing or cross-stitch. Craftivism is a social process of collective empowerment, action, expression and negotiation. In craftivism, engaging in the social and critical discourse around the work is central to its production and dissemination. Practitioners are known as craftivists. The word 'craftivism' is a portmanteau of the words craft and activism.

== Background ==
Domestic arts (crafts) have been a feminized form of art throughout history. Because of its perceived femininity, it was often rendered invisible in larger conversations about art. Instead, contemporary scholarship emphasizes that the marginalization of textile labor has made crafts a powerful tool for feminist resistance, with craftivism using gendered materials to challenge the invisibility of women's work, suffering, and overlooked social issues.

The term craftivism was coined in 2003 by writer Betsy Greer in order to join the separate spheres of craft and activism. Her favorite self-created definition of the term states, "craftivism is a way of looking at life where voicing opinions through creativity makes your voice stronger, your compassion deeper & your quest for justice more infinite". Greer's formulation has since expanded into diverse social practices, with craftivism now understood as an explicitly political form of making that incorporates and emphasizes the marginalized voices of communities and individuals.

A history of Craftivism and creative activism was written by Australian artist and activist, Sayraphim Lothian, including a foreword by Greer. Lothian's main body of work consists of making "tiny handcrafted artworks out on the street for people to find and take home, injecting tiny, unexpected and magical moments in passers-by's lives." The book, Guerrilla Kindness and Other Acts of Creative Resistance, was published in 2018.

More recent scholarship traces the political significance of contemporary craftivism to specific activist contexts. Some examples include data-driven visualization, which uses forms of knitting and embroidery to emphasize underrepresented social issues, and Eastern European craftivist practices that use traditionally-recognized forms such as the cross-stitch and garment alteration as documentation of protest movements and critique on authoritarianism.

== Forms and Movements ==
=== Feminism ===
Craftivism identifies strongly with feminist movements. Craftivism is often interpreted as having emerged from third-wave feminism but feminist activism and craft were unified beforehand.

Practices of craft or "domestic arts" have traditionally existed and been organized spatially within the private sphere. Therefore, the labor and production of craft was generally interpreted as unproductive female labor in the home, as it was never integrated into profit-making systems. Rather, it was marginalized and undervalued. As a result, women's significant and creative work in the private sphere—clothing the family, knitting blankets, weaving the loom—did not receive the same respect as male-dominated activity in the public realm. Furthermore, the patriarchy has been successful in claiming these domestic values for women and using it as a way to keep women in subservient roles. The rise of consumer-friendly crafts, including kits, transfers and readymade designs, has further diminished the status of craft and women's amateur practices. Women and craft have been excluded from the fine art world and as a result many women put their creativity towards craft practices. Craft was "a universal female art from transcending race, class, and national borders. Needlework is the one art in which women controlled the education of their daughters and the production of art, and were also the critics and audience." Although practices of craft were spatially organized within the private sphere, women occasionally would organize groups to engage in these practices collectively. In these craft circles or meet ups women would not only share patterns and skills but also engage in conversation about their lives in the private sphere. These groups of women would discuss their lives and personal struggles encountered as women. This type of group discussion is a form of activism rooted in Consciousness raising that was key to Second-wave feminism as it helped to raise awareness about the types of oppression women were experiencing in their everyday lives.

The Anti Capitalist, Anti Sweatshop and DIY movements popularized practices of craft for activism. These movements influenced third-wave feminists to adopt a craftivism ethos. Most forms of craftivism identify strongly with third-wave feminism. Third-wave feminist crafters are attempting to subvert the association of craft with domesticity by embracing domestic arts while identifying as feminists who are making the choice to embrace this new domesticity. Third-wave feminists are reclaiming knitting, sewing, and other crafting activities traditionally feminized and associated with the private sphere. Through this reclamation, contemporary women aim to reconnect with the female-dominated art forms, to legitimatize the importance of undervalued craft, and to show that 21st century women have the privilege to express themselves through craft, with fewer constraints exercised by the patriarchy. This act of resistance and shattering of the public/private binary is expressed physically through public knitting and craft circles who take a private-sphere activity and insert themselves in the male-dominated spaces of the city One example would be the Anarchist Knitting Mob who held a "Massive Knit" event in Washington Square Park to honor the death of activist and urbanist Jane Jacobs. Knitters decorated the trees, benches, and light posts with colorful yarn and unique patterns. Craftivism can also focus on doing activism in a slow, quiet, compassionate way. Sarah Corbett, founder of Craftivist Collective, encourages craftivists to set up private and public what she coined 'stitch-in' workshops.

=== Environmentalism ===
Craftivism is also centered on ideas of environmentalism and sustainability. When buying new materials, many craftivists choose organic fabrics and fairly traded products such as home-spun yarns. Yet, even more popular within the movement is the utilization of vintage, thrifted and repurposed goods in order to minimize waste and promote reuse. This display of resourcefulness acknowledges the finite resources on Earth, and the valorization of quality over quantity. Craftivist, Betsy Greer, is quoted saying, "While I think that crafting has become something fairly elite and cliquish in some areas, at its heart, it is very much made for individuals who value both their time and their money".

Environmental craftivism has been used alongside 'traditional' forms of activism, such as by the Knitting Nanna's Against Gas (KNAG) who formed on the Northern Rivers area of New South Wales in June 2012 to protest the destruction of land for mining of non-sustainable energy sources in the region. The group describes themselves "as an international disorganization where people come together to ensure that our land, air and water are preserved for our children and grandchildren". Often their activism centers around knit -ins on mining or potential mining sites, in front of politicians and offending companies offices as well as in support of rallies and other community events. At their core is the idea of bringing people together in a non-violent, "mild mannered yet stubborn front" through their craft activities, no matter on the participant's skill levels.

The Tempestry Project is an example of an artwork that uses craft and craftivist techniques to highlight the impacts of climate change on the planet. The collaborative and ongoing project presents climate change data in visual form through knitted and crochet forms. Initiated in 2016, Tempestries are made so that each row is knitted in a specific color to represent the temperature of that location on that specific day. Anyone is able to participate in the project and create their own Tempestry. The Tempestry Project's goal is "to scale this down into something that is accurate, tangible, relatable, and beautiful".

Another form of environmental craftivism could be the act of making pouches or blankets for wildlife affected by environmental disaster, as was the case for many crafters globally who helped hurt wildlife affected by the devastation 2019-2020 Australian Bushfire season.

=== Anti-(_) movements ===
==== Anti-capitalism ====
Historically, craft was the pre-capitalist form of production, where each created item possessed a "use-value," a term comparing the usefulness of an item to the exchange equivalent. Now within a capitalist system of mass production, craft has become a commodity to be bought and sold for money, where it is now referred to as having an "exchange-value". Due to this movement from use-value to exchange-value, there is less emphasis on the time and skill expended to create an object, and more importance on making it available to the masses as inexpensively as possible. Traditionally associated with a strong community so vital to the creation and distribution of craft, crafting has since lost its use-value and has been "captured by capital".

A popular way to resist the commoditization of craft is through the Do-It-Yourself or DIY movement. Popularized through "zines" of the 1990s, DIY inspires people to be self-sufficient and to rely less on the market for basic necessities that can easily be created on one's own. DIY is a resistance to both the capitalist nature of the fashion industry and pressures to conform and buy a style. Crafters have also subverted the market through the use of open source patterns and information sharing on the internet. Sites like Burdastyle allow crafters to upload and download sewing projects at no charge. Similarly, Cat Mazza's online software KnitPro allows users to download images into detailed knitting patterns at no charge.

==== Anti-sweatshop ====
Efforts within the craftivist movement against capitalism focus primarily on the international issue of sweatshops. Some craftivists believe that either sewing one's own clothing or buying only hand-made is the best way to protest unfair labor practices around the globe. Other craftivists take the issue even further, using the act of crafting as a protest against sweatshops. Artist and activist Cat Mazza created a campaign against the inhumane labor practices of Nike through the creation of a giant blanket depicting Nike's trademark swoosh. From 2003 to 2008, international crafters were asked to mail in 4x4 inch stitched squares to border the blanket and to sign a petition against Nike. Mazza also created a second web-based software called Knitoscope that transforms video into animated knitted stitches. In the MicroRevolt website, Cat Mazza introduced a web application that translates digital images into needlecrafts, such as crochet, knitting, and embroidery. Through implementing the KnitPro program, the organization knitted logos in the Tactical media lab in Troy, New York.

Each video has a corresponding testimony featuring various professionals who work against sweatshop labor.

Artist and Activist Kirsty Robertson feels that the subversive efforts of craftivists against capitalism are limited by their dependency on the internet and new communication. She points out that for this reason, global justice knitters are not completely removed from the economy themselves.

=== Anti-war ===
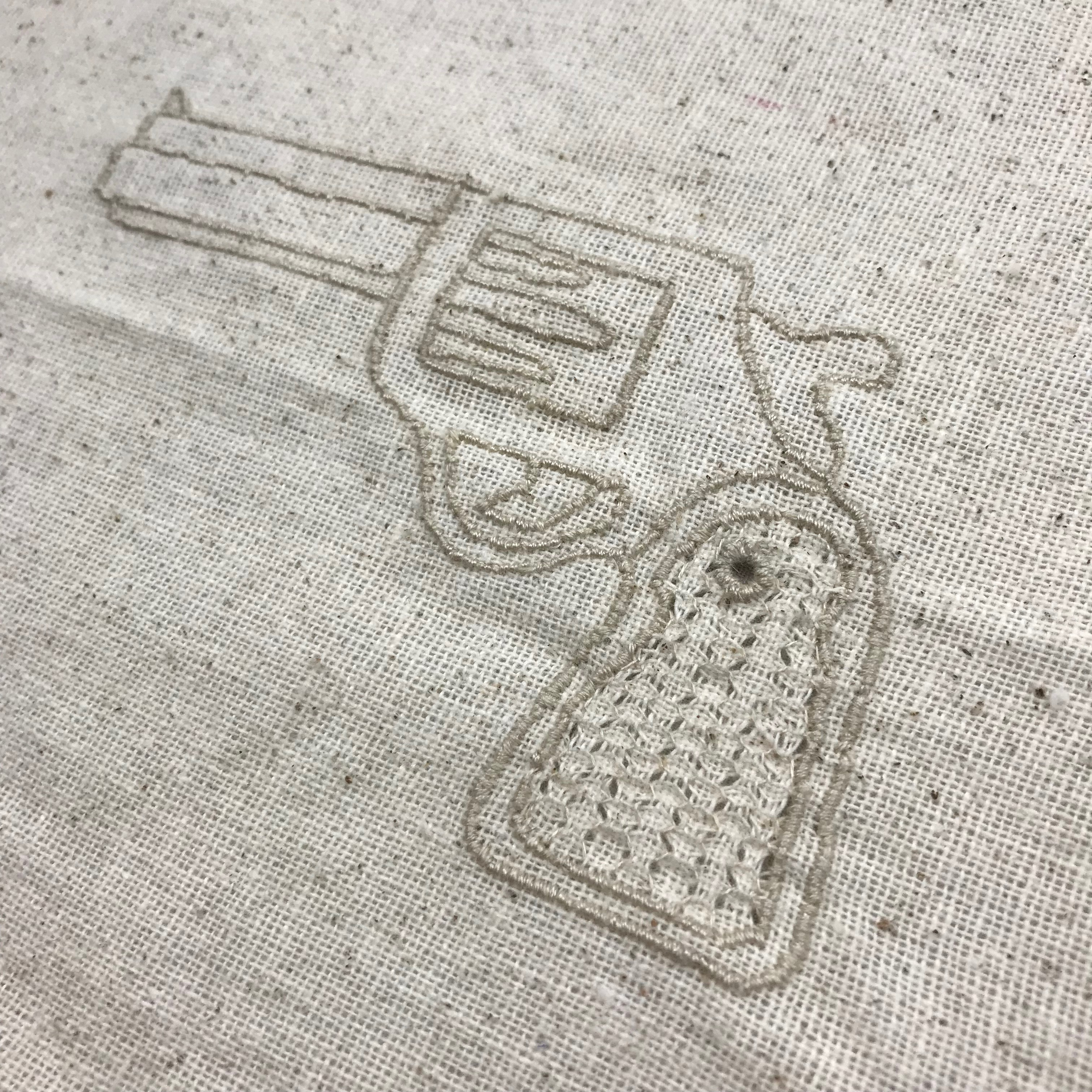
An embroidered gun created for the End Gun Violence Project.

Some craftivists see their art form as a protest against war and violence. Anti-war craftivists choose to make their statement by juxtaposing a colorful, soft, and fuzzy yarn with cold and dangerous weapons. In 2006, Danish artist Marianne Jorgensen stitched a giant pink "tank blanket" and placed it over a M24 Chafee combat tank to protest the Iraq war. She has been making these blankets since Denmark entered the Iraq War, and doesn't plan to stop until it is over. She writes on her website that, "Unsimilar to a war, knitting signals home, care, closeness and time for reflection...When [the tank] is covered in pink, it becomes completely unarmed and it loses its authority". Much like Jorgensen, Canadian artist Barb Hunt works to question the acceptance of military logic in society by creating knitted antipersonnel land mines out of wool.

Similar to her campaign against Nike, Cat Mazza started an anti-war effort entitled "Stitch for Senate" on the fourth anniversary of the Iraq War. She enlisted two people from each state to knit a soldier's helmet liner which would be sent on to every senator. Unlike the apolitical Operation Home Front efforts that knitted gear for soldiers, Mazza wanted "to start a dialogue about the war and to get politicians to keep the promises they made during the midterm elections".

The Viral Knitting Project is an anti-war effort that translates the 0/1 binary code of the dangerous Code Red computer virus into a knitting pattern of knit/purl. The color and code relate to the anti-terrorism alerts of post 9/11 United States. The project is attempting to "draw together links between technology, culture, capitalism and war".

=== Anti-Racism ===
==== Black Lives Matter ====
Sisters In Stitches, a group primarily composed of women of color, was established in the late 1990s to raise awareness for a number of causes using quilting.

In response to the killing of Trayvon Martin and the subsequent rise of the Black Lives Matter movement, Taylor Payne and CheyOnna Sewell founded Yarn Mission, a "knitting collective that is purposefully Pro-Black, Pro-Rebellion, and Pro-Community for the achievement of Black Liberation."

Following the killings of Breonna Taylor and George Floyd and subsequent global Black Lives Matter protests, independent artists donated proceeds towards anti-racism projects, mutual aid funds, and national bailout funds to help protesters detained by law enforcement. Artists used sites like Etsy to promote BLM donations. Some crafters donated either a percentage of proceeds or in full, and others made crafts to spread the message of the movement, making t-shirts, face masks, and stickers. There have been criticisms, however, concerning non-Black sellers profiting off the movement. "Both independent creatives and companies should be donating profits to demonstrate solidarity," said Fresco Steez, an activist with Movement for Black Lives and co-founder of Black Youth Project 100. "And it can't just be a percentage. Otherwise, businesses [and creative independents] are essentially benefitting from the social struggles at the heart of the protests," she said.

=== Social justice issues ===
The Craftivist Collective, founded by Sarah Corbett, is an inclusive group of people committed to using thoughtful crafted works to help themselves and encourage others be the positive change they wish to see in the world. There is a manifesto and a checklist of goals for the work of the group which includes being welcoming, encouraging and positive, creative and non-threatening, and focusing on global poverty and human rights injustices.

One of the Craftivist Collective's key achievements was to convince the M&S board to pay their 50,000 employees the living wage in 2015. This campaign was awarded with the Economic Justice Campaigner of the year 2017 by Sheila McKechnie Foundation, who was also nominated for the 2017 Care2 UK Impact Award.

On the back of this award, Sarah Corbett continues to work with large charities to deliver strategic craftivism projects and teach them in the art of gentle protest.

== Criticism ==
Craftivism has been shaped by longstanding discourse regarding the status of women's creative expression in the art world, especially the use of art as a means of political and social commentary. Women's textile work has historically been positioned as "applied" or "decorative", a hierarchy that positioned fiber-based and home-women's craft forms as a less influential forms relative to painting and sculpting. Contemporary scholars claim that the devaluation of textile arts in the realm of political commentary contributes to the ongoing invisibility of gendered labor. This devaluation often leads to the dismissal of craftivist actions as to be apolitical or sentimental, even when targeting relevant political issues.

Feminist art discourse has also raised questions on whether craftivism challenges or reinforces domesticity and 'traditional' roles associated with femininity, something that the contemporary feminism movement is desperate to pull away from. Certain critics argue that using traditionally feminine materials and techniques risks the reproduction of gendered expectations, other scholars emphasize that the reclamation of domestic craft serves as a feminist strategy, drawing political force from the very history that undervalues women's labor. This tension is a part of a broader and more complex feminist movement discourse, regarding the role of embodied material practices as a form of political resistance.

Intersectional critiques further shape the discussion of craftivism as a mode of political and social commentary. Feminist activism has prominently struggled with issues of exclusion, and these dynamics become visible within craft-based movements as well. Commentators have argued that projects such as the Pussyhat movement unproportionally reflected the priorities and aesthetics of cisgender white women, raising questions in regards to the priorities and goals of the movement; who's experiences are centered and whose are marginalized within highly visible craftivist campaigns. Another notable critique is that forms of craftivism associatyed with white, Western femininity, such as yarnbombing or decorative textile work, has often been perceived as 'benign' and 'cosy', while more politically urgent textile work created by marginalized communities often receives less recognition or undergoes more scrutiny.

Craftivism has also been criticised for its uneven global visibility. In Eastern Europe, textile-based activism has played a meaningful role in documenting political violence and advancing feminist resistance. Some examples include Belarusian protest embroidery and Ukrainian garment interventions. Despite the prominence of these movements as a form of political testimony in their respective region, such movements have failed to receive any notable Western media coverage, emphasizing how craftivism is especially susceptible to geopolitical and cultural biases.

Concerns over growing institutionalization of craftivism should also be noted. As craft-based activism enters classrooms, museums, and community programs, its political intent may be softened due to the institutional emphasis on reflection, collaboration and, dialogue. Raising a concern regarding the future of the movement, more accurately its unintentional depoliticization, instead framing the movement as therapeutic and aesthetic, rather than confrontational and political. Craftivism is at risk of this due to its limited application and recognition on global platforms.

Despite these criticisms however, craftivism continues to provoke discussion in regards to labor, forms of femeninity, material practices, activism, and modes of femenist resistance.

== In transition ==
In the spring of 2009, an online debate began over the definition of craftivism. The debate spread after the self-titled Craftivism team on Etsy had an inner-group argument about the political affiliation of its members, causing some members to leave the group. The original description of the group states, "The Etsy Craftivism Team is a team of progressive Etsyans who believe that craft and art can change the world. Some of us use our work to carry messages of protest and political activism. Others believe that the act of making craft can be an act of resistance. Still others see that by buying and selling directly from the maker we are challenging the all pervasive corporate culture that promotes profit over people." Conservative members accused the group of assuming a liberal agenda, and argued that politics should not be involved. Some members of the group felt that the mere act of crafting itself was political, while others felt that the act must also be attached to a political message. Rayna Fahey from Radical Cross Stitch replied to a thread stating "Personally if a John McCain supporter joined this group and told me that my latest piece in support of indigenous sovereignty was a well-made piece that serves the purpose for which it was designed well, I'd think that was awesome and I'd have hope for the future of this world." In contrast, craftivist Betsy Greer believes that "the personal is political," and that you cannot separate the two. Sarah Corbett from Craftivist Collective adds that craftivism is "to think critically and discuss compassionately how we can all be part of positive social change."

=== Contemporary American politics ===
Since the 2016 election, the massive increase in public activism has given rise to more methods of art activism and craftivism as well. The Pink Pussyhat Project was popularized with the Women's March from 2017 and 2018. There was also a movement called the Welcome Blanket project, which aims to show solidarity to immigrants and refugees with blankets. Additionally, there has been The Kudzu Project, a guerilla knitting art installation started in Charlottesville, VA where flash installations of knitted kudzu vines were draped on Confederate monuments to "call attention to the role of these statues in perpetuating false narratives about the Civil War and white supremacy."

In response to the January 2026 ICE operation in Minnesota knitting a Melt the ICE Hat became a popular example of craftivism.

== Contemporary craftivism through a virtual world ==
From even before the pandemic, the emergence of online crafting communities has facilitated new forms of participation and community. Even though it's been moved online, the social aspects of craft "were considered highly salient" because of the "profoundly collective phenomenon" of practices like knitting.

Since the start of the pandemic, sewers and crafters have come together to create and distribute reusable fabric face masks. The demand for face masks, particularly reusable ones, came about with the supply shortage of personal protective equipment such as N-95 face masks throughout the pandemic. The Million Mask Challenge, a virtual challenge that started on Facebook, rapidly evolved to an international challenge to sew and distribute face masks to healthcare workers, then other frontline workers.

== Bibliography ==
- Bratich, Jack (2006). "The Other World Wide Web: Popular Craft Culture, Tactical Media, and the Space of Gender". Revision for Critical Studies in Media Communication.
- Greer, Betsy (2008). Knitting for Good!. Trumpeter. ISBN 978-1-59030-589-8.
- McFadden, David Revere (2007). Radical Lace and Subversive Knitting. Antique Collector's Club. ISBN 978-1-85149-568-9.
- Railla, Jean (2004). Get Crafty. Random House. ISBN 0-7679-1720-0.
- Spencer, Amy (2005). DIY: The rise of lo-fi culture. Marion Boyars Publishers. ISBN 978-0-7145-3105-2.
