= Gentle protest =

Type of activism

- Years active: 2015 -
- Major figures: Sarah Corbett

Gentle protest is an approach to activism which states that it aims to change hearts, minds, policies and laws through thoughtful and compassionate actions, intending to invite reflection and respectful conversation rather than division. It is purposefully non-aggressive.

Its name came from a 2015 exhibition by Sarah Corbett at Föreningen Handarbetets Vänner in Stockholm which aimed to show that protests do not always have to be aggressive. The message of the exhibition was: "If we want our world to be more beautiful, kind & just, then our activism should be beautiful, kind & just". The exhibition was shown at Helsinki Design Week and as part of The Future Is Present exhibition at Designmuseum Denmark.

Corbett is an activist for social justice, Ashoka fellow, author and founder of the Craftivist Collective, a global social enterprise for individuals, groups and organisations to learn how to use crafts as a tool for activism. She has said that 'gentleness'—which is not passive or weak—is the golden thread that creates real positive impact in her work.

In 2017 she wrote a book, How To Be A Craftivist: The Art of Gentle Protest, and ran a six-week online course titled "The School of Gentle Protest" as part of a project funded by Arts Council England in collaboration with the University of Lincoln. Visiting professors included Orsola de Castro of Fashion Revolution and Catherine Howarth, CEO of ShareAction.

Gentle protest has been used as a framework by groups in Potsdam, the Lake District, and at WWF to protest on a broad range of issues. Corbett has worked with organisations including The Scout Association.
