= Craftivist Collective =

British advocacy group

- Founded: 2009
- Founder: Sarah Corbett
- Type: Social enterprise
- Location: London, England
- Website: craftivist-collective.com

The Craftivist Collective is "an inclusive group of people committed to using thoughtful, beautiful crafted works to help themselves and encourage others be the positive change they wish to see in the world." It was set up in 2009 by Sarah Corbett. It is based in London.

The Independent describes it as "a social enterprise that helps people to engage in activism, or craftivism, in a quiet, non-confrontational manner". The Guardian has called it "new mindful activism" that is "thought-out, strategic and engaging in approach".

They were named by the Times as one of their five 'New Tribes' of 2012.

Activist and Nobel Peace Prize laureate Malala Yousafzai has taken part in a workshop. Other followers of the movement include Lauren O'Farrell, Reverse graffiti artist Moose, Guardian craft columnist Perri Lewis, jewellers Tatty Devine, comedian Josie Long, Tilly Walnes, entrant in the first series of the Great British Sewing Bee, Company craft columnist and author Jazz Domino Holly, and mosaic artist Carrie Reichardt. Sam Roddick is a mentor to the group and suggested the honorary label 'Craptivist' to cover non-crafty supporters.

There is a manifesto and a checklist of goals for the work of the group which includes being welcoming, encouraging and positive, creative and non-threatening, and to focus on global poverty and human rights injustices.

The group is supported by patrons.

== About ==
The Craftivist Collective's efforts have been deemed 'guerrilla crafting', as their projects often involve leaving crafted messages in public places. Their projects are often small-scale, intended to bring viewers closer to the work. There are lists of projects to do and video tutorials online. They run talks, workshops, stalls and exhibitions and sell Craftivist Collective kits and merchandise.

The 'collective' is a loose term that encompasses anyone who gets involved. The group particularly seeks to engage people who haven't previously had much involvement or interest in civic engagement. For many members the group is a stepping stone to more traditional activist methods. Corbett calls it 'slow activism' and 'introverted activism', saying "it's not about performance and vying for attention, it's about offering people the choice to engage".

The groups hold regular meetings. Other groups such as Women's Institutes and schools have also been involved in projects. The collective is self-funded and receives donated materials from supporters.

== History ==
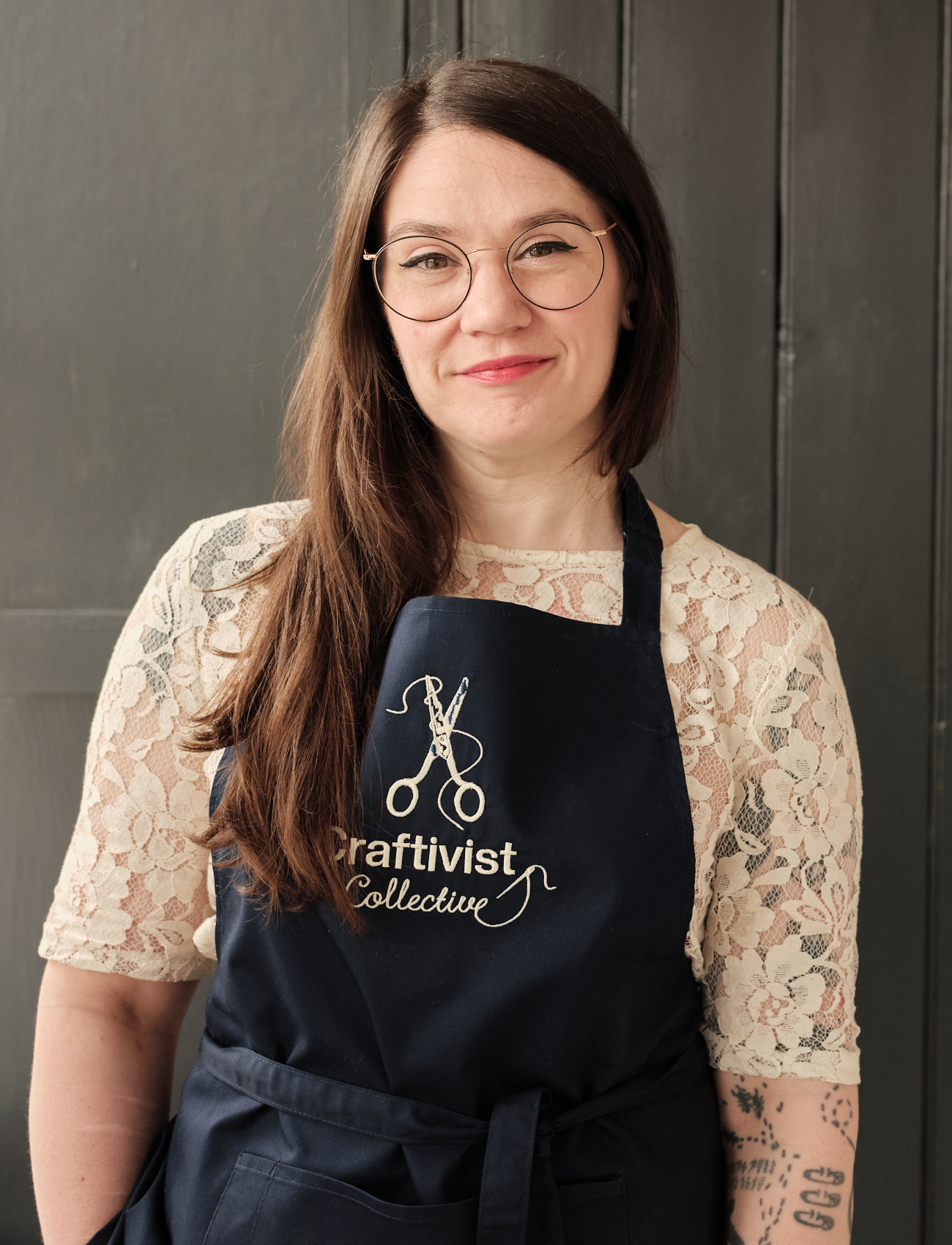
Founder Sarah Corbett in 2023

A self-proclaimed 'burnt-out activist' who disliked the image of the aggressive activist, but wanted to do something to change the world, Sarah Corbett was involved in activism while growing up in Liverpool and then studying at the University of Manchester. She worked for traditional charities for seven years. It was after moving to London for a job in 2007 and joining various activist groups that she started getting increasingly into her hobby of cross-stitch, finding that it helped with stress.

She didn't feel like she fit into any of the activist groups she joined in London. She had been cross-stitching as a hobby since the age of 18 and in August 2008 had the 'light bulb' idea to combine the two.

Corbett set up the Lonely Craftivist blog in 2008 and began receiving comments and emails from people around the world asking to join in. She held a first meeting and got in touch with sociologist Betsy Greer who coined the word 'craftivism' in 2003. Greer encouraged Corbett to found and coordinate a national group called Craftivist Collective. In 2012, Corbett went part-time at her Oxfam job to devote more time to the collective, and in October 2012 she gave up her job to work full-time for Craftivist Collective.

The collective's work employs craft to speak to broader issues. In 2010 and 2011, the group left 'samplers' around London Fashion Week Sites with cross-stitched statistics on the low wages of laborers making the clothes that high-paid fashion models wore on the runway. Sarah Corbett encourages people to send cross-stitched messages to politicians, arguing that they are more memorable than an email or a petition. In 2015, Corbett and the Craftivist Collective researched the members of the board for Marks & Spencer, a retail company that failed to pay its employees livable wages. The group presented cross-stitched gifts to M&S board members, encouraging the company to pay 50,000 of their staff members fairly. Ten months later, the company made significant changes to their wages; Corbett said that the board took her side and that it was "the most powerful campaign they'd witnessed."

== Partnerships ==
The group have worked with:

- Bystander Revolution
- Christian Aid
- Mind
- One World Week
- Oxfam
- People & Planet
- Save the Children
- Toms Shoes
- UNICEF
- War on Want

They co-created the Craftivism badge for Girlguiding.

Their manifesto was used by the World Wildlife Fund in a campaign that helped change the law to protect migratory birds.

The collective supports Fine Cell Work, a social enterprise that trains prisoners in needlework.

== Workshops ==
The group have run workshops at:

- Anya Hindmarch
- Craft Contemporary in Los Angeles
- Greenbelt festival
- Hayward Gallery
- NUS Student Conference
- Queen Elizabeth Hall
- Secret Cinema
- Secret Garden Party
- Sheffield Doc/Fest
- Southbank Centre
- Tate Britain
- UCL
- Victoria and Albert Museum with Coats
- Wilderness Festival
- The Women's Library

== Exhibitions ==
The group's work has been exhibited at:

- The Bluecoat gallery in Liverpool
- The People's History Museum
- St Fagans museum in Cardiff
- The Ulster Hall, Belfast

== Talks and lectures ==
- Bauhaus University
- British Museum
- Leeds College of Art
- Parsons The New School for Design
- Sunday Wise
- TedX
- University College London
- Wigtown Book Festival

== Books ==
- A Little Book of Craftivism, published in 2013 by Cicada.
- How To Be A Craftivist, published in 2017 by Unbound.
- Canary Craftivists Manual, self-published in 2021.
- Craftivist Collective Handbook: 20 craft projects to help to make a positive difference in our world, due to be published in 2024 by Unbound.

== Media ==
- BBC Radio 4 'Four Thought'
- NPR
- Sarah Brown's Better Angels podcast
- Material Matters with Grant Gibson podcast
- Al Jazeera
- Canal+ television show Nouveaux Explorateurs: Megalopolis

== Awards ==
- Civility in Politics - Campaigner of the Year 2022, nominated alongside Marcus Rashford and Richard Ratcliffe, partner of Nazanin Zaghari-Ratcliffe
- Sheila McKechnie Foundation - Economic Justice Campaigner 2017, winner
- Care2 Innovator Award 2017
- Observer Ethical Awards - Arts & Culture Award 2013, runner-up
