= From Ashes to New =

American rock band

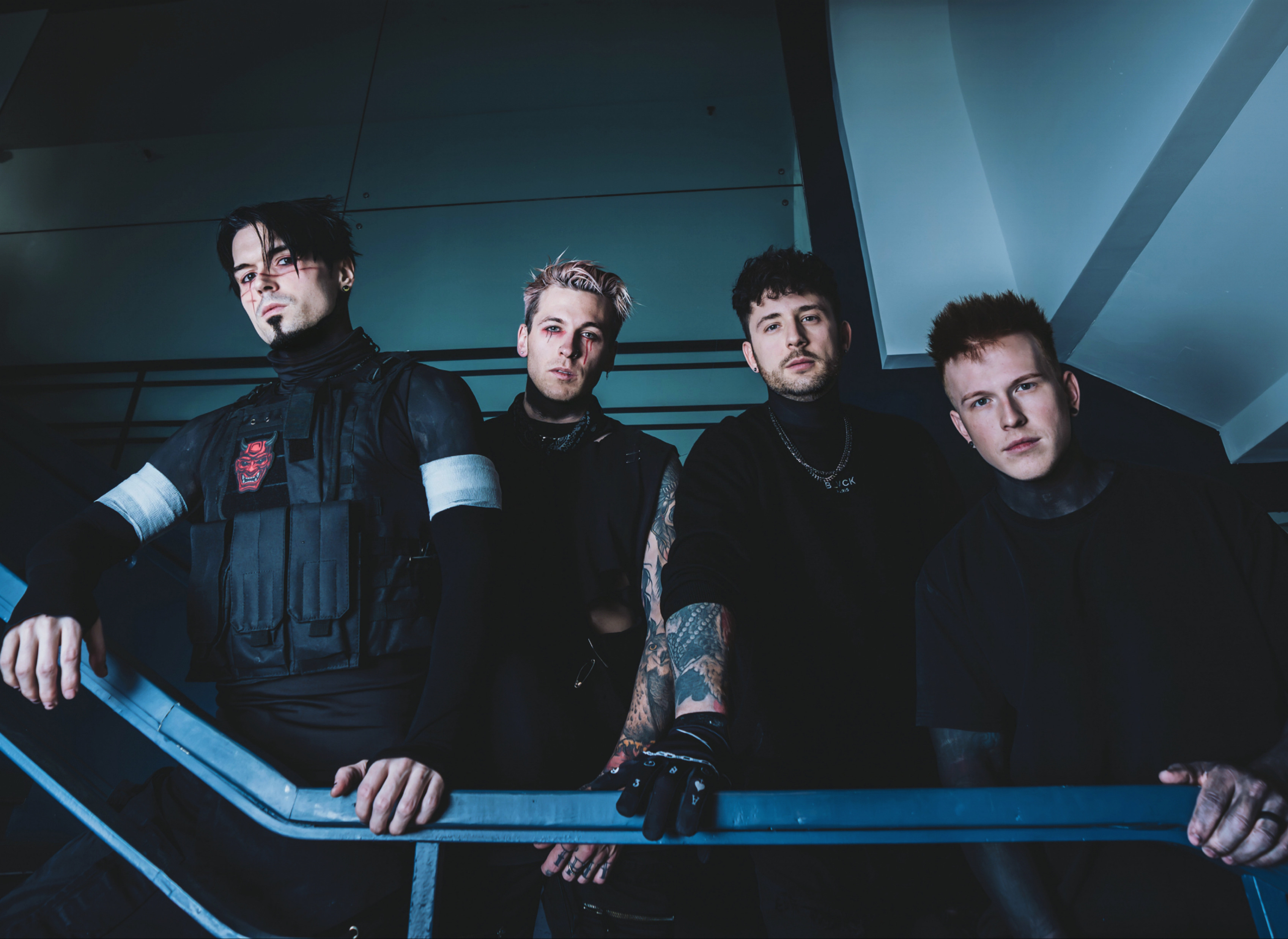
- From Ashes to New in 2024

Background information
- Origin: Elizabethtown, Pennsylvania, U.S.
- Genres: Nu metal; rap metal; alternative metal; rap rock
- Works: Discography
- Years active: 2013–present
- Labels: Eleven Seven; Better Noise
- Members: Matt Brandyberry; Lance Dowdle; Mat Madiro; Danny Case; Jimmy Bennett
- Past members: Branden "Boo" Kreider; Chris Musser; Tim D'onofrio; Dan Kecki; Garrett Russell; Jon-Mikel Valudes
- Website: fromashestonew.com

From Ashes to New is an American rock band from Elizabethtown, Pennsylvania. The band's lineup frequently shifted in its early years, with musician Matt Brandyberry being the founding and sole constant member of the group. The band has released five studio albums, Day One, The Future, Panic, Blackout and Reflections. They have found success with many of their singles, including "Through It All", "Crazy", and "Panic", which reached peaks of 6, 3, and 11, respectively, on the Billboard Mainstream Rock chart. Their singles "Nightmare", "Until We Break", "Hate Me Too", and "Armageddon", from the album Blackout, have earned them success as well.

== History ==
From Ashes to New was formed in 2013 in Lancaster, Pennsylvania, releasing their debut single, "My Fight", followed by an eponymous extended play. In 2015, they released a second extended play, Downfall, as a taste of their debut album, set to be released in 2016. Day One was released on February 26, 2016. A deluxe edition of the album was released exclusively online on November 18, 2016. It includes an acoustic version of "Lost and Alone" as well as other new tracks. This deluxe edition was exclusively digital, with no Compact Disc or LP Record versions available.

The band also recorded a song with CFO$, "Hail the Crown", the main theme song for the professional wrestling program WWE 205 Live.

In December 2016, they began recording for their second studio album. On March 11, 2017, it was announced that drummer Tim D'onofrio and lead vocalist Chris Musser had decided to leave the band, and that Mat Madiro, formerly from Trivium, had stepped in as their new drummer. The band began looking for a new lead singer through social media websites. After a series of auditions submitted by fans, Danny Case (formerly of Vanity Strikes) was revealed to have been chosen as the new lead singer on July 13, 2017.

On February 1, 2018, the band released "Crazy", the first single from their upcoming album The Future. The full album was released on April 20, 2018. The album debuted at number 163 on the Billboard 200 chart.

On October 4, 2019, a remix of The Hu's "Yuve Yuve Yu" was released, featuring new vocals by Case.

On July 25, 2025, the band released "New Disease" from their upcoming album Reflections. Rap vocalist, Matt Brandyberry, says of the song's theme, "Every day there's a new wave of people going out of their way to be recognized no matter the cost. We are hypnotized by our vices...we will kill ourselves to be noticed." The album was released on April 17, 2026, via Better Noise Music. A deluxe edition of the album released on November 13, 2026 featuring four additional songs.

== Musical style and influences ==
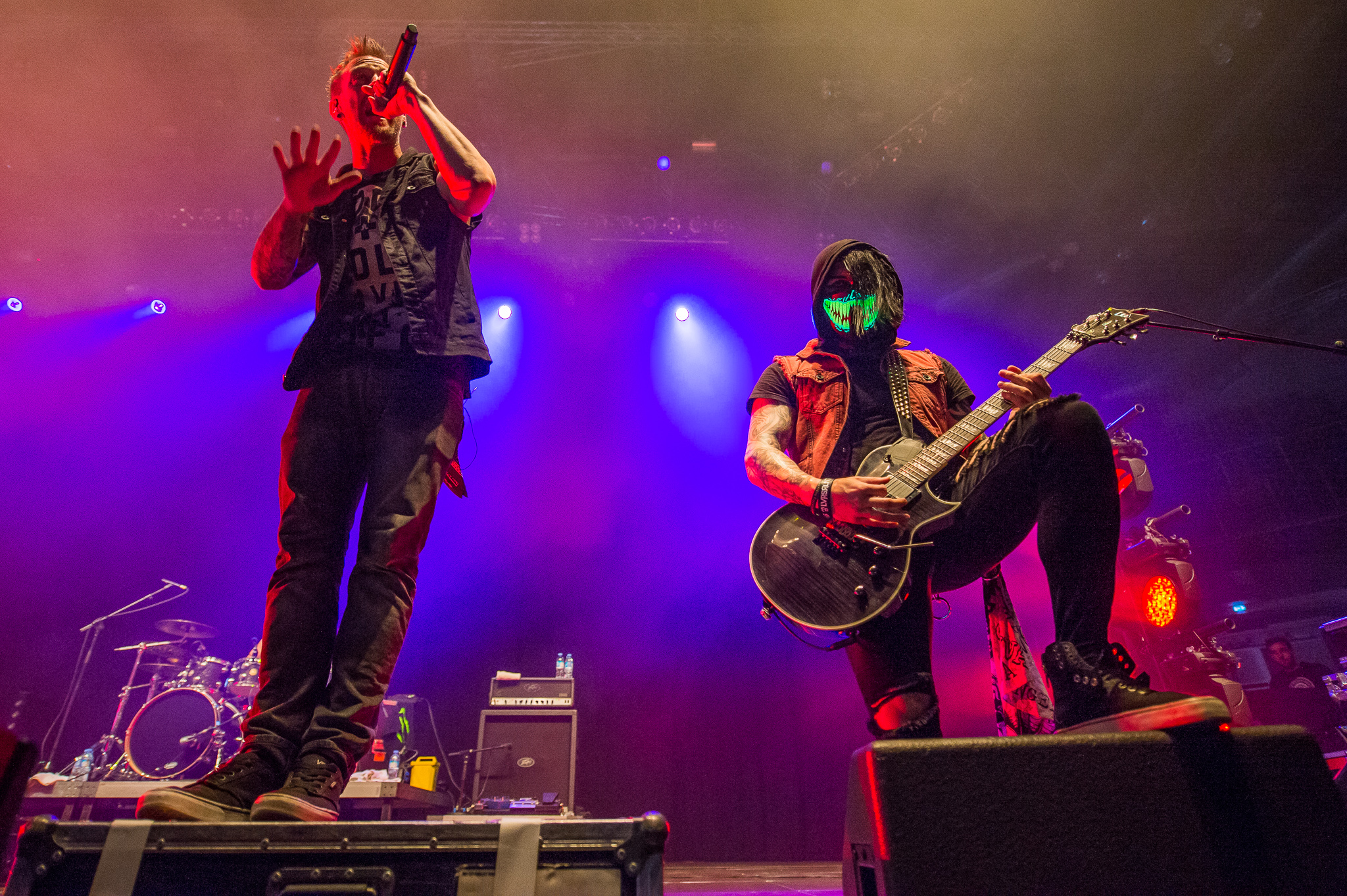
From Ashes to New performing at Rock im Park in 2016

From Ashes to New has been described as rap metal, nu metal, rap rock, and alternative metal. The band's music also features elements of genres such as alternative rock, punk rock, hard rock, heavy metal, hip-hop, electronicore, and electronica.

The band's influences include Bone Thugs-n-Harmony, Korn, Linkin Park, Skrillex, Sevendust, Breaking Benjamin, Eminem, DMX, Drag-On, Pantera, Glassjaw, Alexisonfire, Alice in Chains, Of Mice & Men, and Papa Roach.

== Band members ==
Current

- Matt Brandyberry – rap vocals, keyboards, synthesizers, programming (2013–present); clean vocals (2017, 2020–present); bass, rhythm guitar (2017–2025); unclean vocals (2020–present)
- Lance Dowdle – lead guitar, bass (2015–present)
- Mat Madiro – drums, percussion (2017–present, touring 2016)
- Danny Case – lead vocals (2017–present)
- Jimmy Bennett – rhythm guitar, bass (2025–present, touring 2023–2025)

Former

- Jon-Mikel Valudes – drums, percussion (2013–2014)
- Dan Kecki – lead guitar (2013–2015)
- Garrett Russell – bass (2013–2015)
- Chris Musser – clean vocals (2013–2017)
- Branden Kreider – rhythm guitar, unclean vocals (2013–2017); bass (2015–2017)
- Tim D'onofrio – drums, percussion (2014–2017)

Timeline

== Discography ==
- Day One (2016)
- The Future (2018)
- Panic (2020)
- Blackout (2023)
- Reflections (2026)
