= Céline Semaan Vernon =

Lebanese fashion designer

Céline Semaan-Vernon
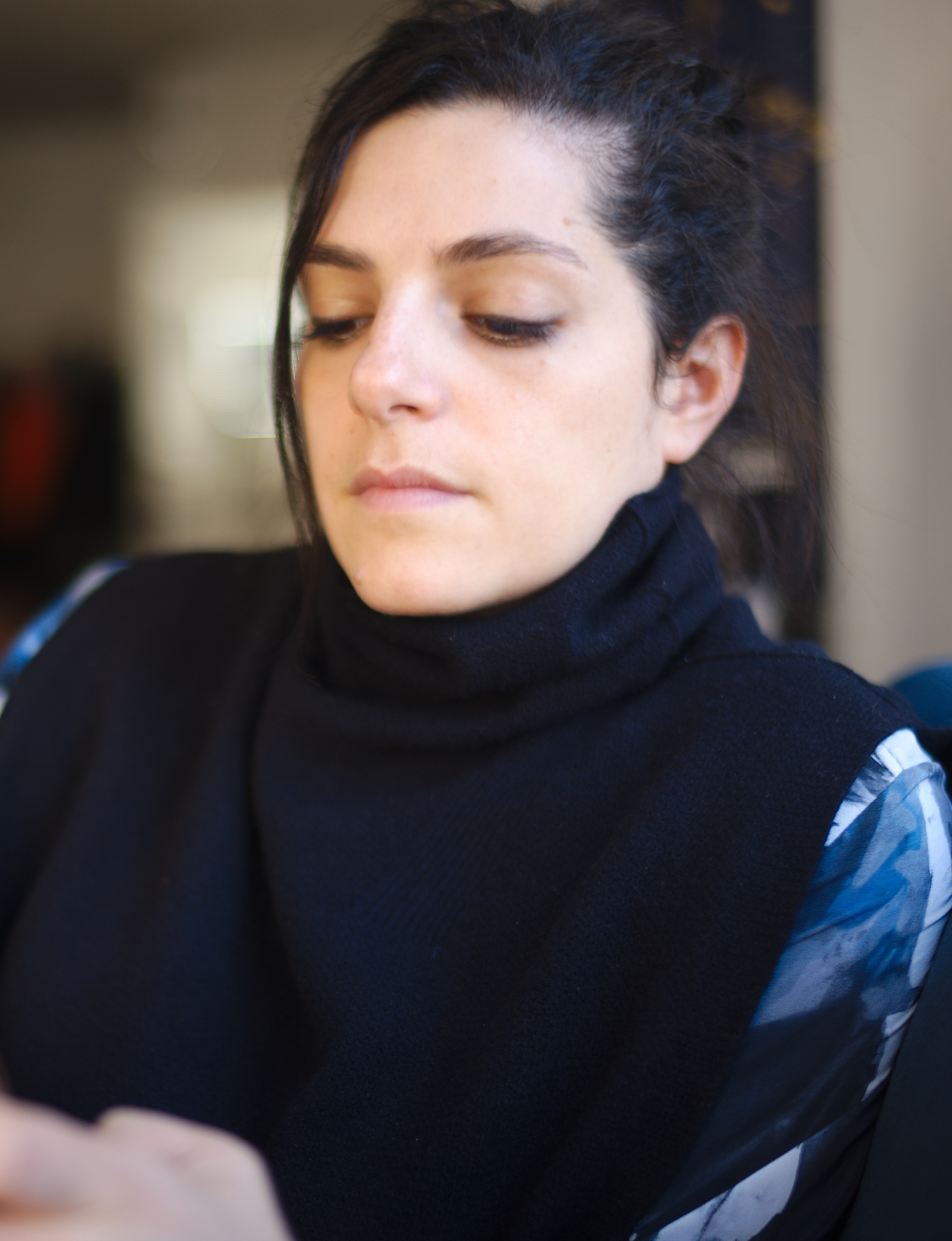
- Céline Semaan-Vernon in 2018
- Born: Céline Semaan; 1982 (age 43–44); Beirut, Lebanon
- Occupations: Fashion designer and writer
- Known for: Fashion activism MIT Media Lab Director’s Fellow; United Nations
- Website: https://celinecelines.com/

Céline Semaan-Vernon is a Lebanese-Canadian artist, designer, writer, and advocate. She is the founder of Slow Factory Foundation, a 501c3 public service organization. She is on the council of Progressive International, became a Director's Fellow of MIT Media Lab in 2016, and served on the board of directors of American Institute of Graphic Arts (AIGA) NY, a nonprofit design organization.

== Career ==
Semaan began her career as a designer and community organizer. She worked as a user-experience designer for Huge, General Assembly, and Condé Nast.

As an artist and designer her work has been featured in the Museum of Modern Art and Cooper Hewitt in New York, the de Young Museum in San Francisco.

Semaan is a recognized expert in the space of environmental and social justice. She coined the term fashion activism, and has also worked extensively to raise awareness of other issues and causes around social and environmental justice by broadening her platform, such as bringing the word 'decolonize' to the pages of popular fashion magazines.

She is known for her activism in social justice causes especially around refugees, cultural appropriation, and Arab identity, her advocacy for sustainable practices in fashion, and her work as a digital and product designer.
