= Reflections (From Ashes to New album) =

Studio album by From Ashes to New
- Released: April 17, 2026; November 13, 2026 (Deluxe)
- Length: 40:25
- Label: Better Noise
- Producers: From Ashes to New; Jon Lundin

From Ashes to New chronology
Blackout (2023)	Reflections (2026)

Singles from Reflections
- 1. "New Disease" Released: July 24, 2025; 2. "Drag Me" Released: December 4, 2025; 3. "Villain" Released: January 29, 2026; 4. "Die for You" Released: March 5, 2026; 5. "Forever" Released: April 16, 2026

Reflections (Deluxe)

Singles from Reflections (Deluxe)
- 1. "Die For You (feat. Neoni)" Released: August 21, 2026; 2. "Love Me" Released: September 25, 2026

Reflections is the fifth studio album by American rock band From Ashes to New. The album was released on April 17, 2026, via Better Noise Music. A deluxe edition of the album released on November 13, 2026 featuring four additional songs.

== Critical reception ==
Professional ratings
Review scores
Source	Rating
Distorted Sound	4/10

New Noise Magazine stated that "Across 12 songs, the group explores mental health, themes of heaven and hell, and reaching a place where one can feel satisfied with what they have done along with other topics while dipping into new sonic territory and vocal duties, with Brandyberry singing on "Die For You"".

Blabbermouth.net states that the album consists of "12 songs that brim with even more confidence and power than before".

Colin Jones of Distorted Sound was critical of the album. He praised the catchy choruses and Danny Case's vocals, but criticized Matt Brandyberry's rapped lyrics as "eye-rolling" and called the overall instrumentation "bog standard". Summarizing the album, he wrote, "There’s nothing truly offensive about Reflections, but there’s even less to praise. It’s another factory-produced hard rock record that will inevitably stream well and have zero cultural impact."

== Track listing ==
No.	Title	Length
1.	"Drag Me"	3:06
2.	"Forever"	3:38
3.	"Villain"	3:53
4.	"Die For You"	3:27
5.	"Black Hearts"	3:22
6.	"Upside Down"	3:12
7.	"(Not) Psycho"	3:09
8.	"Parasite"	3:20
9.	"New Disease"	3:13
10.	"Darkside"	3:35
11.	"Falling from Heaven"	3:01
12.	"Your Ghost"	3:23
Total length:		40:25

Deluxe edition
No.	Title	Length
13.	"Love Me"	3:39
14.	"After Death"	3:35
15.	"Die For You" (Feat. Neoni)	3:27
16.	"Die For You" (Feat. The Midnight)	4:20
Total length:		55:28

== Charts ==
Chart (2026)	Peak position
UK Albums Downloads (Official Charts)	29
