= Melt the ICE Hat =

Fashion activist hat

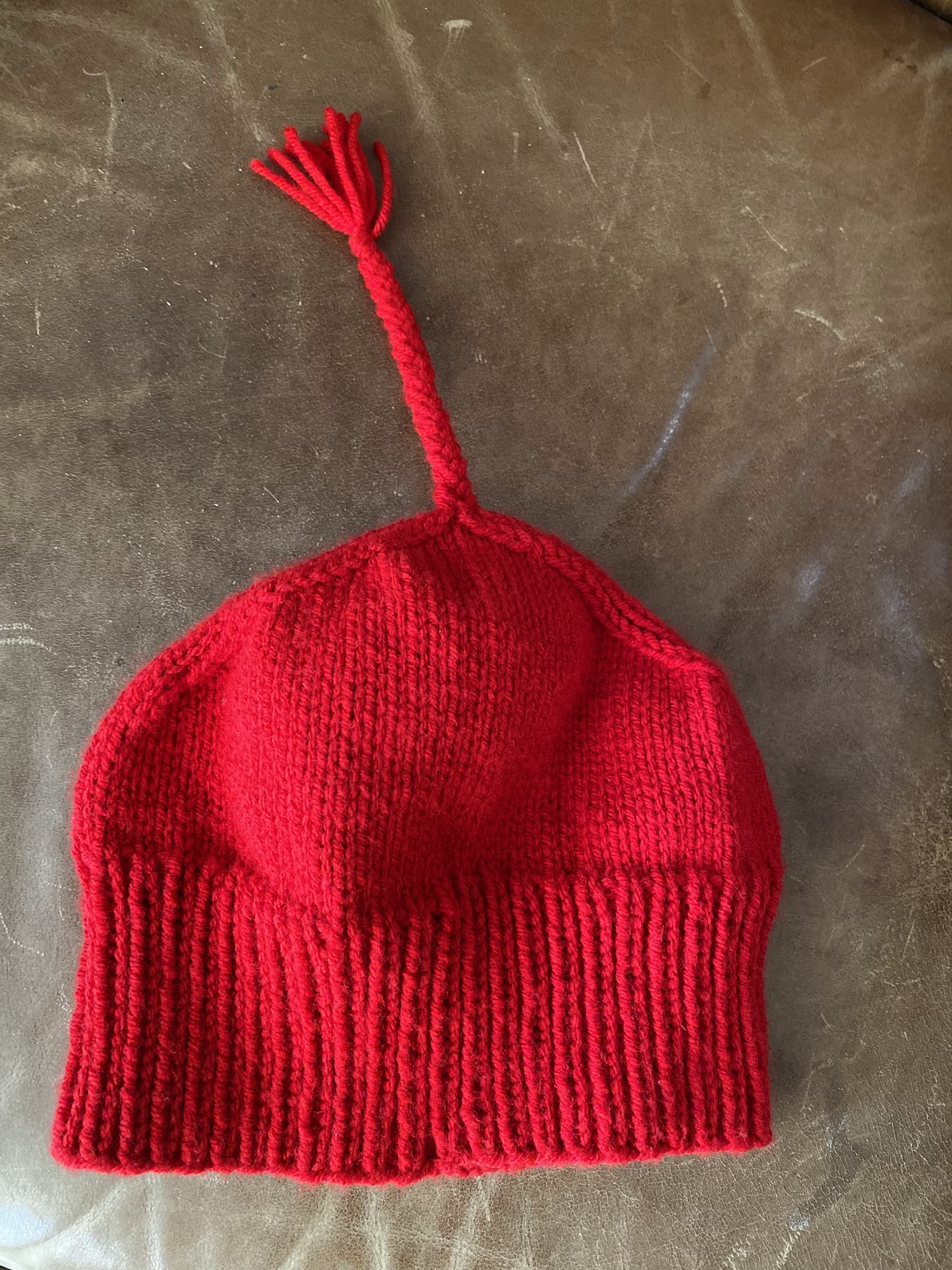
a Melt the ICE Hat, 2026

The Melt the ICE Hat is a red knit hat with a braided tassel designed by Paul Neary as a fashion activism and craftivism response to the January 2026 ICE operation in Minnesota inspired by the Norwegian resistance hat popular during Norway's Nazi occupation.

== Background ==
Minnesotans seeking a way to protest ICE activity in their state through knitting and crocheting, and disinterested in returning to the pussyhats popularized as a symbol of resistance against Donald Trump in 2016, began knitting red hats as a symbol of resistance against escalating violence, unconstitutional detainment of American citizens, and the deaths of Renée Good and Alex Pretti.

The design for the hat was shared widely on social media. Interest in the hat resulted in a shortage of red yarn throughout Minnesota.

== Historical background ==
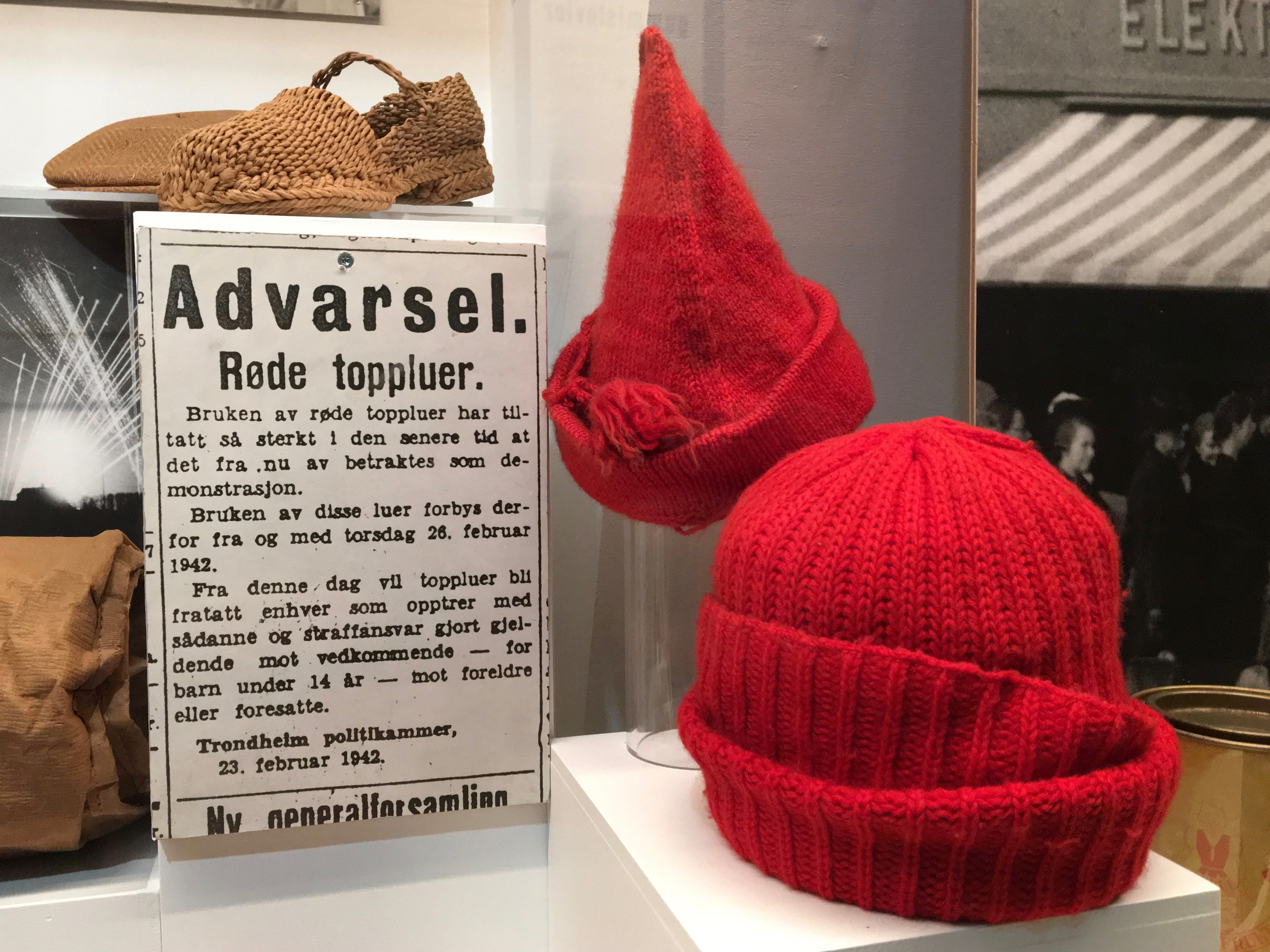
Examples of Norwegian resistance hats displayed in Norway's Resistance Museum.

During the Nazi occupation of Norway, knitting and wearing red toppluer or nisselue style hats became a symbol of Norwegian resistance.

== See also ==
- Craftivism
- Fashion Activism
- Knit Cap
- Phrygian Cap
- Pussyhat
