= Crazy (From Ashes to New song) =

Single by From Ashes to New

from the album The Future
- Released: February 1, 2018
- Recorded: 2017
- Genre: Rock
- Length: 3:10
- Label: Eleven Seven
- Songwriters: Danny Case; Matt Brandyberry; Lance Dowdle; Mat Madiro; Grant McFarland
- Producers: Grant McFarland; Carson Slovak

From Ashes to New singles chronology
"Through It All" (2015)	"Crazy" (2018)	"Panic" (2020)

Music video
- "Crazy" on YouTube

"Crazy" is a song by American rock band From Ashes to New. It was their first single off of their second album The Future. It peaked at number 3 on the Billboard Mainstream Rock Songs chart in July 2018.

== Background ==
The song was released as the first single from their second studio album, The Future, released ahead of the album itself in February 2018. The song debuted with a lyric video on February 2, followed by a full-fledged music video later being released a month later on March 6. The song was the first to be released with the band's new lineup; band founder Matt Brandyberry and guitarist Lance Dowdle returned from the earlier lineup, alongside new vocalist Danny Case and new drummer Mat Madiro, previously the drummer of Trivium. In July 2018, the song peaked at number 3 on the Billboard Mainstream Rock Songs chart, making it the band's highest charting song, ahead of "Through It All", which peaked at number 6.

== Themes and composition ==
The song's lyrics were written around an experience of Case's, with him explaining:

"'Crazy' is, at its core, a song about someone or something driving you absolutely out of your mind and feeling unable to walk away from it. I feel like everyone at one point or another experiences that in their lives. For me personally, I dated someone for a very short period of time and it felt like everything I said and did was wrong. I honestly thought I was losing my mind because I knew it was a bad situation, but I just felt like I couldn't walk away. I think having that life experience really helped when we sat down and wrote the lyrics"

Brandyberry stated that the song was also inspired by the difficulties he had been going through with the band in the years prior, including members leaving the band, and his resulting stress and anxiety because of it.

== Personnel ==
Band

- Danny Case – vocals
- Matt Brandyberry – vocals, rap vocals, keyboards, rhythm guitar
- Lance Dowdle – lead guitar
- Mat Madiro – drums

== Charts ==
Chart (2018)	Peak position
Germany Rock Airplay (Official German Charts)	3
US Hot Rock & Alternative Songs (Billboard)	45
US Rock & Alternative Airplay (Billboard)	23
US Mainstream Rock (Billboard)	3
