= Blackout (From Ashes to New album) =

Studio album by From Ashes to New
- Released: July 28, 2023
- Studio: Atrium Audio
- Genres: Rap metal; hard rock; rap rock; nu metal
- Length: 41:17
- Label: Better Noise
- Producers: Carson Slovak; Grant McFarland; Josh Gilbert; Matt Brandyberry

From Ashes to New chronology
Panic (2020)	Blackout (2023)	Reflections (2026)

Singles from Blackout
- 1. "Heartache" Released: June 17, 2022; 2. "Until We Break" Released: October 7, 2022; 3. "Nightmare" Released: February 3, 2023; 4. "Hate Me Too" Released: March 17, 2023; 5. "Armageddon" Released: May 19, 2023

Blackout (Deluxe)
- Deluxe edition cover

Singles from Blackout (Deluxe)
- 1. "Barely Breathing" Released: February 2, 2024; 2. "One Foot in the Grave" Released: April 19, 2024

Blackout is the fourth studio album by American rock band From Ashes to New. It was released on July 28, 2023, through Better Noise Music. The deluxe edition was released on June 7, 2024. The album reached number one on multiple charts around the world, including in Japan, the UK, Australia, and Germany.

== Background and release ==
On June 17, 2022, the first single, titled "Heartache", was released. The band released the next single, "Until We Break", featuring Matty Mullins of Memphis May Fire, on October 7.

On February 3, 2023, the third single, "Nightmare", was released. On March 17, alongside the release of the fourth single, "Hate Me Too", the band announced the title of their fourth studio album, Blackout, and its release date of July 28. The fifth single, "Armageddon", was released on May 19.

On February 2, 2024, the band released a re-recording of the track "Barely Breathing", with guest vocals from Chrissy Costanza of Against the Current. On April 19, the band released the single "One Foot in the Grave", featuring Aaron Pauley of Of Mice & Men, and announced that the album's deluxe edition would release June 7, including collaborations with Yelawolf and Sullivan King.

== Composition ==
Blackout has been described as rap metal, hard rock, rap rock, and nu metal.

== Critical reception ==
Professional ratings
Review scores
Source	Rating
My Global Mind	8/10
Wall of Sound	7.5/10

My Global Mind stated that "From the moment the spitfire lyrics in "Heartache" open, to the closer "Broken by Design", the album steamrolls with a ferocious groove" and "The dual vocals of Danny Case and Matt Brandyberry (rap vocals) do complement the band's sound quite well".

Heavy Magazine called the work "A prequel of sorts to their 2016 debut Day One, Blackout mirrors the frame of mind experienced during its writing stage, harnessing feelings and emotions that encapsulate the distress of a pre-apocalyptic world referenced heavily on that debut album but with the benefit of years of touring and recording under their belts".

== Track listing ==
All tracks are written by Danny Case, Lance Dowdle, Mathew Madiro, and Matt Brandyberry, with additional writers where noted.

Blackout track listing
No.	Title	Writer(s)	Length
1.	"Heartache"	Carson Slovak; Chris Kelly; Grant McFarland	3:45
2.	"Nightmare"	Slovak; McFarland	3:07
3.	"Hate Me Too"	Slovak; McFarland	3:30
4.	"Hope You're Happy"	Slovak; McFarland; KJ Strock	3:36
5.	"Barely Breathing"	Slovak; McFarland; Kane Churko	3:08
6.	"Dead to Me"	Slovak; McFarland	3:19
7.	"Monster in Me"	Slovak; McFarland	3:34
8.	"Echoes"	Slovak; McFarland	3:27
9.	"Armageddon"	Slovak; Kelly; McFarland	3:33
10.	"Legacy"	Slovak; McFarland	3:39
11.	"Until We Break" (featuring Matty Mullins)	Slovak; Kelly; McFarland	3:34
12.	"Broken by Design"	Slovak; McFarland; Churko	3:05
Total length:			41:17

Deluxe edition
No.	Title	Writer(s)	Length
13.	"Barely Breathing" (featuring Against the Current)	Slovak; McFarland; Churko	3:10
14.	"One Foot in the Grave" (featuring Aaron Pauley)	Slovak; Kelly; McFarland	3:28
15.	"Live Before I'm Dead (Hours)"	Jonathan Gering	3:30
16.	"Monster In Me" (featuring Yelawolf)	Slovak; McFarland; Yelawolf	3:36
17.	"Nightmare" (Sullivan King remix)	Slovak; McFarland	2:54
18.	"Hate Me Too" (acoustic)	Slovak; McFarland	3:36
Total length:			61:39

== Personnel ==
Credits adapted from Tidal.

From Ashes to New

- Danny Case – lead vocals
- Matt Brandyberry – rap vocals, keyboards, rhythm guitar, bass
- Lance Dowdle – lead guitar, bass
- Mat Madiro – drums

Additional musicians

- Matty Mullins (Memphis May Fire) – guest vocals (11)
- Chrissy Costanza (Against the Current) – guest vocals (13)
- Aaron Pauley (Of Mice & Men) – guest vocals (14)
- Yelawolf – guest rap vocals (16)
- Sullivan King – remixer (17)

Additional personnel

- Carson Slovak – production, engineering
- Grant McFarland – production, programming, engineering
- Josh Gilbert – production (1, 3, 4, 5, 8, 10, 13)
- Ted Jensen – mastering (all except 16 & 18)
- Joseph McQueen – mixing (all), mastering (16 & 18)
- Nick Squillante – mastering (3, 5, 7, 9, 14, 15)
- Jonathan Gering – production (15)

== Charts ==
Chart performance for Blackout
Chart (2023)	Peak position
UK Album Downloads (Official Charts)	65
UK Independent Album Breakers (Official Charts)	18
UK Rock & Metal Albums (Official Charts)	31
Swiss Albums (Schweizer Hitparade)	98
