= Evangelical Alliance Mission =

Evangelical Christian mission organization

The Evangelical Alliance Mission
- Abbreviation: TEAM
- Formation: October 14, 1890; 136 years ago
- Founder: Fredrik Franson
- Type: Non-profit, missions agency
- Legal status: Active
- Purpose: Evangelism, Church planting, Community development
- Headquarters: Maryville, Tennessee, U.S.
- Region served: Worldwide
- Fields: Healthcare, Education, Social Justice
- Affiliations: Inter-denominational Evangelical
- Staff: 575
- Website: team.org
- Formerly called: Scandinavian Alliance Mission (1890–1949)

The Evangelical Alliance Mission (TEAM) is an inter-denominational evangelical Christian missionary organization founded by Fredrik Franson. As a global missions agency, TEAM partners with the global church in sending disciples who make disciples and establish missional churches to the glory of God, going where the most people have the most need and proclaiming the gospel in both word and action.

Founded more than 130 years ago, TEAM partners with churches to send missionaries to work in evangelism, church planting, community development, healthcare, education, social justice, business as mission and many other areas of global missions.

== History ==
TEAM was founded on October 14, 1890, by Rev. Fredrik Franson (as the Scandinavian Alliance Mission, or S.A.M.). Early missionaries pioneered in China, Japan, South Africa, Mongolia, India and Venezuela Following Franson’s death in 1908, the mission continued to expand into Latin America and thrive in Africa and Asia. Following World War II, the ministry grew rapidly as wartime experiences fueled passions to serve overseas and provided new missionaries with the skills to do it.

In 1949, the Scandinavian Alliance Mission changed its name to become The Evangelical Alliance Mission, or TEAM, a better reflection of its broad scope of ministries and missionaries. In the decades following, TEAM opened major initiatives in the Arab world, and developed specialized ministries such as hospitals, Bible institutes, orphanages, publications, linguistic work, and children’s education to support its overall mission of church planting.

TEAM grew both organically and through mergers with other missions, and by the beginning of the 21st century had also renewed its focus on “post-Christian” regions of Europe and Central America. TEAM workers celebrated as the mission’s vision came full-circle when they began working for the first time in Sweden, homeland of founder Fredrik Franson.

Today, in a rapidly changing missions context both in the United States and abroad, TEAM and its network of over 2,000 churches continues to explore new fields for missionary work and innovative new ways to serve. Today, more than 575 TEAM missionaries and staff serve in more than 40 countries.
