= Don't Panic TV =

Pornographic TV channel

Don't Panic TV was an Italian-operated, British-owned pornographic channel that existed between 2002 and 2004. The channel broadcast pornographic movies, mostly of European production, over satellite. It was also broadcast over Africa, especially South Africa, where the channel was at the center of a large-scale controversy.

== History ==
Don't Panic was set up by a British company (Media Satellite) and was already available in a handful of European countries. The channel was founded in July 2002 and started broadcasting on November 1, 2002. The channel was multilingual, having several language tracks available. Due to a loophole, the channel was made available in South Africa from January 2003 (as the first such channel available in the country) by means of a subscription smartcard costing R2000 (US$250 at the time of its launch).

Shortly after broadcasts to South Africa began, the channel was already into hot water over the nature of its content - pornographic movies that are normally banned in South Africa - hot off the heels of debates regarding pornographic content on South African television, as e.tv had already broadcast softcore Emmanuelle movies, which paled in contrast to the hardcore movies broadcast by the Italian network. Bill Carne, an agent of the British owners of the network, wanted to sell 1,000 smartcards to receive the channel. Don't Panic TV was treated in South Africa as a "foreign satellite television service" under the grounds that ICASA didn't register the channel in South Africa. Smartcards were also given to ensure that access to under-18s was restricted. Local regulators, as soon as they became aware of the situation of the channel, said that they didn't have the power to control these broadcasts. Multichoice, on its part, was concerned that its DStv decoders were being used for such smartcards carrying its content and had already launched an investigation into the affair.

Multichoice opted to distance itself from the channel. Authorities quickly (by early March 2003) reacted, demanding Don't Panic TV withdraw from the South African market. Stanley Mamaregane of ICASA demanded that broadcasters without a license to operate in the country should be withdrawn. Two more adult channels were also scheduled to broadcast to the country by the end of the year. George Horn from Pretoria, holder of the distribution of smartcards in the country, claimed that ICASA's argument was "unfounded".

== Programming ==
Using the Irdeto encryption method, Don't Panic TV broadcast pornographic movies from renowned production companies such as Pinko and Trading, as well as interviews with porn actors and actresses. The channel broadcast three movies a day, repeated throughout the day to make a 24-hour cycle. Most of the feature films broadcast by Don't Panic were in English or Italian, and were mostly of Italian production.
