= Day One (From Ashes to New album) =

Studio album by From Ashes to New
- Released: February 26, 2016
- Genres: Nu metal; rap metal; electronic rock; hard rock
- Length: 36:56
- Label: Eleven Seven
- Producer: Grant McFarland

From Ashes to New chronology
Day One (2016)	The Future (2018)

Singles from Day One
- 1. "Through It All" Released: November 12, 2015; 2. "Same Old Story" Released: January 7, 2016; 3. "Lost and Alone" Released: April 14, 2016; 4. "Breaking Now" Released: December 5, 2016

Day One is the debut studio album by American rock band From Ashes to New. The album was released on February 26, 2016. A deluxe edition was released on November 18, 2016, which contains the acoustic version of "Lost and Alone" and three new tracks. This deluxe edition was exclusively digital, with no compact disc or LP record versions available. It is the only studio album to feature first vocalist Chris Musser, who left the band in March 2017.

== Critical reception ==
Professional ratings
Review scores
Source	Rating
Anti-Hero Magazine	(8/10)
KillYourStereo.com	(63/100)
Mosh	(6/10)
Rock Feed	4.5/5 stars

The album received generally positive reviews. In a positive review by RockFeed, reviewer Brian Storm states "Day One features a plethora of larger than life choruses and infectious melodies, something that will likely pay off for them on rock radio." In another positive review by Randy Shatkowski of Anti-Hero Magazine, he says that "the triple-threat of clean, soaring vocals, in your face rap, and guttural roars makes for a unique combination, even if the individual pieces have been used before". Johnny Guagliardo of KillYourStereo.com says in a mixed review that "Day One seems to follow some (unintended) weird formula, which gives you a good song then a not so good one...", and goes on to say that "they're recycling everything you heard in 1998, 2003 and then once again in 2007, merely under a new packaging."

== Track listing ==
All tracks are written by From Ashes to New and Grand McFarland.

No.	Title	Length
1.	"Land of Make Believe"	3:11
2.	"Farther from Home"	3:33
3.	"Lost and Alone"	3:09
4.	"Shadows"	3:26
5.	"Through It All"	3:33
6.	"Face the Day"	3:03
7.	"Downfall"	3:43
8.	"Breaking Now"	3:30
9.	"Every Second"	3:34
10.	"Same Old Story"	2:56
11.	"You Only Die Once"	3:22
Total length:		36:56

Deluxe edition
No.	Title	Length
12.	"The Last Time" (featuring Deuce)	3:02
13.	"An Ocean of Its Own"	3:31
14.	"Who's Laughing Now"	3:25
15.	"Lost and Alone" (acoustic)	2:58
Total length:		49:52

== Personnel ==
Credits adapted from AllMusic

From Ashes to New

- Matthew Brandyberry – rap vocals, keyboards, programming
- Chris Musser – unclean vocals, clean vocals
- Lance Dowdle – lead guitar, bass
- Branden Kreider – rhythm guitar, bass, unclean backing vocals
- Tim D'onfrio – drums, percussion

Additional personnel

- Daniel Kecki – guitar
- Garrett Russell – bass

Production

- Brian Gardner – mastering
- Grant McFarland – engineer, mixing, producer, backing vocals
- Adam Serrano – art direction, design
- Carson Slovak – engineer, mixing

== Chart performance ==
Chart (2016)	Peak position
US Billboard 200	53
US Digital Albums (Billboard)	12
US Top Album Sales (Billboard)	23
US Top Rock Albums (Billboard)	6
US Hard Rock Albums (Billboard)	2
US Independent Albums (Billboard)	5
US Alternative Albums (Billboard)	4
