= Betsy Greer =

American writer

Betsy Greer is a writer, editor, maker and speaker credited with originating the term craftivism.

== Biography ==
Greer was born in Cincinnati, Ohio in 1975, and grew up in Charlotte, North Carolina. She received her undergraduate degree in English literature from the University of North Carolina at Chapel Hill (1998) and her M.A. in sociology from Goldsmiths, University of London (2004). Greer currently resides in Durham, North Carolina.

== Publications ==
- Knitting for Good! (2008)
- Craftivism: The Art of Craft and Activism (2014)
