= Armageddon (From Ashes to New song) =

Single by From Ashes to New

from the album Blackout
- Released: May 19, 2023
- Genre: Rap rock
- Length: 3:33
- Label: Better Noise
- Songwriters: Danny Case; Matt Brandyberry; Grant McFarland; Carson Slovak; Chris Kelly; Lance Dowdle; Mat Madiro
- Producers: Brandyberry; McFarland; Slovak

From Ashes to New singles chronology
"Nightmare" (2023)	"Armageddon" (2023)	"Thriller (with No Resolve)" (2023)

Music video
- "Armageddon" on YouTube

"Armageddon" is a song by American rock band From Ashes to New. It was released on May 19, 2023, via Better Noise Music as a single from their fourth studio album, Blackout.

== Background and release ==
"Armageddon" was released on May 19 as a single from Blackout. The band described the song as focusing on the current state of the world and how fighting and division are contributing to some of the worst social times in recent history. The music video was released on May 19, 2023, alongside the single. It was directed by JOSIAHx and is apocalyptic-themed.

In an interview with New Noise Magazine, Danny Case said the band tried to blend his and Matt Brandyberry's vocal parts more closely. The magazine wrote that songs including "Armageddon" showed that approach through the interaction between the two vocalists and harkened back to Linkin Park and other early-2000s influences that inspired the band.

== Composition ==
The song has been described as a rap-rock track featuring rap verses, melodic choruses and rock instrumentation. It opens with synthesizers before transitioning into rock elements.

== Critical reception ==
MXDWN wrote that "Armageddon" "has something for everyone", and described it as having a "wide range of musical stylings" with "broad appeal". The publication also said the song's rap-style lyrics "offer listeners a glimpse into a deeper narrative". Metal Planet Music wrote that the song features moments of quiet and calmness mixed into extreme metalcore sections. The publication also commented on the band's use of dynamics and mixing, and noted moments of calmer vocals or instrumentals before "slamming back into the music". Riff Magazine described the song as having "anger and urgency" that "most closely fits the lyrical concept of 'pre-apocalyptic' times". Top Shelf Music wrote that the song has themes of societal turmoil and human fragility, and said its "addictive rhythm and harmonious blend of vocals and instrumentals" build into "an unforgettable crescendo".

== Personnel ==
Credits adapted from Apple Music:

- Danny Case – lead vocals
- Matt Brandyberry – vocals, keyboards, guitar, bass, programming
- Lance Dowdle – guitar
- Mat Madiro – drums
- Grant McFarland – producer
- Carson Slovak – producer
