= Fredrik Franson =

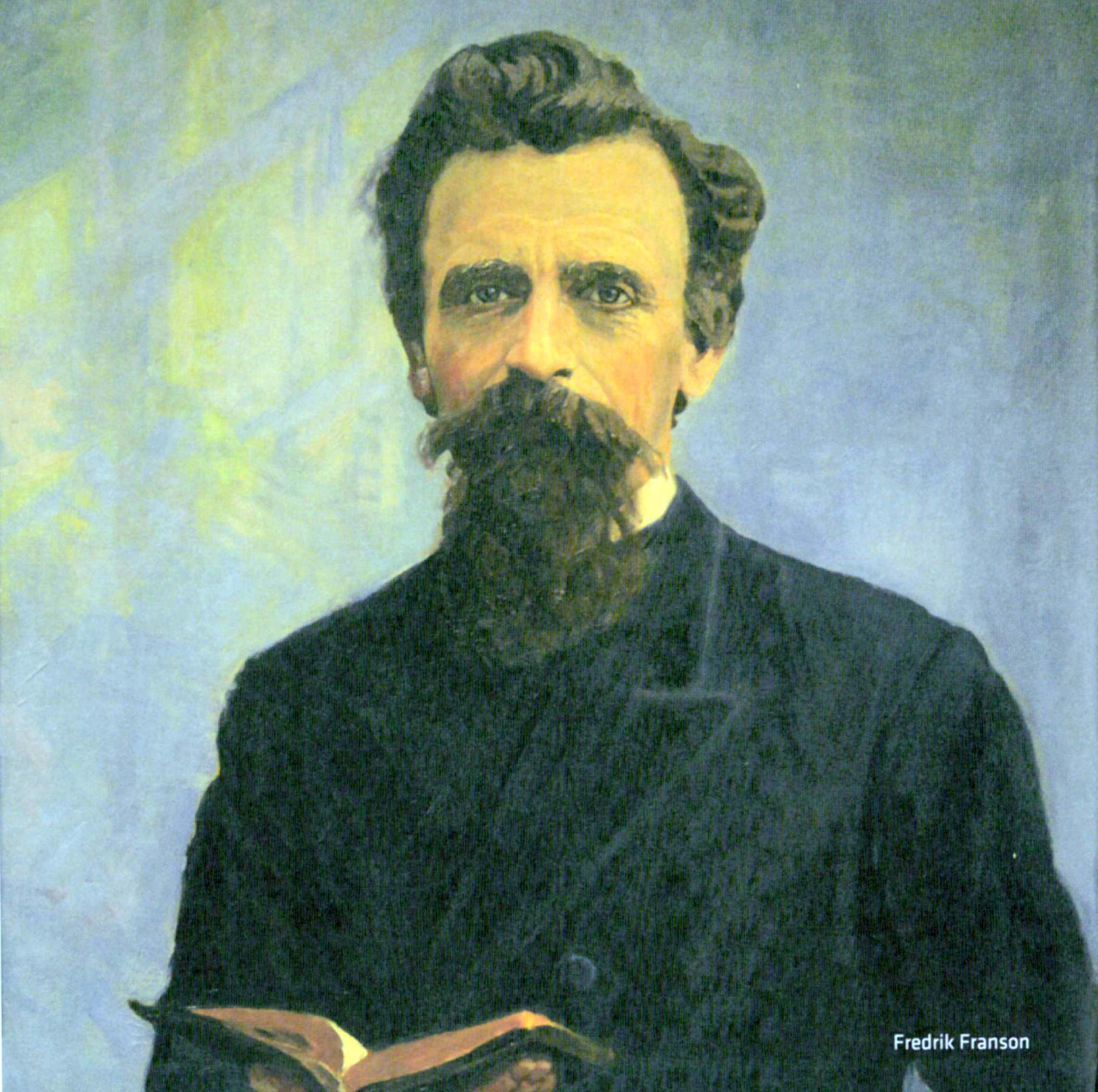
Fredrik Franson

Fredrik Franson (June 17, 1852 – August 2, 1908) was a Swedish-born American evangelical theologian, founder of The Evangelical Alliance Mission (TEAM), of Chicago, Illinois. He has been called "Moody's Swedish disciple".

== Biography ==
He was born in Pershyttan, Västmanland, Sweden to Frans Ersson and Maria Nilsdotter. His father died when he was young and his mother later remarried a member of the mission society, Per Olsson. He joined his two brothers, Frans and Eric, in America in 1869. He was accompanied by his parents, a brother August, and a half-sister Anna; the group traveled with Lutheran minister Olof Olsson. They settled in Saunders County, Nebraska, where the family established a home three miles north of Mead. He underwent a spiritual crisis while ill, leading to his religious awakening. In 1875, he joined a small Baptist church near his home in Estina, Nebraska, and was baptised. He preached his first sermon in that school house where the Baptist church held its services.

His next years were spent traveling to many countries teaching and preaching. Franson went to Chicago in 1876 hoping to meet the famous evangelist Dwight L. Moody. He became a part of the church founded by Moody and was trained by the evangelist as a counselor and learned Moody's revivalist preaching techniques. Like Moody, Franson was an ecumenist and believed in working together with other Christians to spread the gospel regardless of differences in denomination. He was part of the Free Mission Friends, who followed after Moody and distinguished themselves from the Mission Friends, who were followers of the more traditional Carl Olof Rosenius and Läsare movement. Franson adopted premillennial beliefs, preaching on the imminent rapture. One scholar argues that Franson, "more than any other Swede in America and Sweden, promoted the new premillennial view".

Franson began preaching in Lutheran Ansgar and Mission Synod churches, as well as Baptist churches in the Midwest; however, the Lutheran Augustana Synod disapproved of his preaching, deeming it novel, unconventional, and a threat. Franson returned to Nebraska to minister to Scandinavian immigrants, but in 1879 he felt led to go to Utah Territory to minister to some 30,000 Swedish immigrants who had gone there for inexpensive land. Franson's evangelistic endeavors were broadened to include members of the Church of Jesus Christ of Latter-day Saints who had recently settled in Utah Territory. In 1880, he worked with Leander Hallgren to establish a number of evangelical, non-denominational churches in Nebraska with an emphasis on setting aside denominational differences.

Two years later, Franson left for his homeland. He brought the seeds of the early Pentecostal movement to Sweden, preaching to large gatherings. In Norway, Franson founded free mission organizations in twelve cities. In Denmark, Franson was imprisoned for a month for his evangelical activities before being expelled. During this extensive ministry in Europe, he heard noted missionary statesman Hudson Taylor (1832–1905) challenge people to go to China with the gospel. From that encounter, Franson received a vision to form missions agencies in various European countries, and before he left the continent, six such organizations had come into being: Danish Mission Confederation, Swiss Alliance Mission, German Alliance Mission, Finnish Alliance Mission, Swedish Evangelical Mission in Japan, and Swedish Alliance Mission. All six agencies continue to send out missionaries to this day.

After arriving back in America, Franson continued to preach. His desire to motivate others for cross-cultural missions led him to form a training class in Brooklyn, New York. In 1890, he founded the Scandinavian Alliance Mission in Chicago, later known as The Evangelical Alliance Mission, also several missions in Sweden.

His first class on October 14, 1890, is recognized as the "birthday" of TEAM, although the early name for the agency was "The Scandinavian Alliance Mission." This name reflected Franson's vision to bring churches together into an alliance enabling even small congregations to have a part in sending out missionaries. Classes were also initiated in Chicago, Minneapolis and Omaha. Soon a formal board of directors came into being, and on January 17, 1891, the first band of 35 missionaries boarded a train for the West Coast and eventually China.

Photographs of these early missionaries depict a dedicated group of people who chose to live and dress as the Chinese did. Other groups soon joined the first recruits, and Franson fervently challenged still more to go. In order to get to China, the early missionaries had to pass through Japan, and that soon became a new field for the mission. In a similar manner, by 1892, a small group also went to Swaziland. In 1906 T. J. Bach and his wife left for Venezuela. Bach would later become TEAM's third general director. In 1897, Franson founded Svenska Mongolmissionen. The same year, he wrote Himlauret, in which he published his calculated date for the Second Coming of Christ. In 1908, following one of his lengthy trips to the fields, Franson took several days off to rest at the home of some friends in Idaho Springs, Colorado.

Franson died August 2, 1908, in Idaho Springs, Colorado. His age was 56. Services were held at the Presbyterian Church in Colon, Nebraska, and burial was in Estina Cemetery, south of Leshara. His body was later moved to Chicago into the Franson-Risberg Memorial Mission Home.

== Legacy ==
Franson's piety has led to him being described as a "Swedish Franciscan figure". The mission which Franson founded with one field and 50 missionaries has grown to well over 1000 missionaries in over 20 fields. His legacy was a group of dedicated people whose desire was to take the gospel to all people. Franson's two passions – evangelism and church planting – continue to be the focus of TEAM's worldwide ministry.

== Other sources ==
- Edward P. Torjesen (1983) Fredrik Franson : a model for worldwide evangelism (Pasadena: William Carey Library) ISBN 9780878081912
- O.C. Grauer (1939) Fredrik Franson: Founder of the Scandinavian Alliance Mission (Scandinavian Alliance Mission)
- David B Woodward (1966) Aflame for God: Biography of Fredrik Franson, founder of The Evangelical Alliance Mission (Moody Press)
- Torjesen Edwa (2013) Fredrik Franson (William Carey Library)
