= Panic (From Ashes to New song) =

2020 single by From Ashes to New

Single by From Ashes to New

from the album Panic
- Released: April 17, 2020
- Recorded: 2019
- Genre: Nu metal
- Length: 3:21
- Label: Better Noise
- Songwriters: Danny Case; Matt Brandyberry; Lance Dowdle; Erik Ron

From Ashes to New singles chronology
| "Crazy" (2018) | "Panic" (2020) | "What I Get" (2020) |

Music video
- "Panic" on YouTube

"Panic" is a song by American rock band From Ashes to New. It was their first single off of their third studio album Panic. It peaked on the Billboard Hard Rock Digital Song Sales chart at number 7 in May 2020, and at 11 on the Billboard Mainstream Rock Songs chart in 2020.

== Background ==
"Panic" was the first single released from From Ashes to New's third studio album, Panic. The song was released on April 17, 2020, and accumulated over 1.5 million streams in under a month. The song features the same lineup as their prior album, The Future, something the band felt was a strength in their favor in recording, as the band had been through multiple difficult lineup changes prior. The band returned to working with music producer Colin Brittain on the track, because they enjoyed working with him during the prior album on the track "Nowhere to Run", and worked with producer Erik Ron, known for working with Godsmack, because they felt he would help the song's quiet-loud dynamic. A music video for the track was also released; production for it was very difficult due to it occurring during the beginning of the COVID-19 pandemic. Band member Matt Brandyberry described it as a "race against the clock" and a "The Book of Eli" type situation to make, with crew members constantly leaving in order to self-quarantine, and local restaurants and hotels closing down to the public. The video was just finished before the state of New York was shut down.

== Themes and composition ==
Metal Injection described the song as "a song about dealing with anxiety" that "became an emotional anthem for what we are all going through", in reference to the COVID-19 pandemic.

== Personnel ==
Band

- Danny Case – lead vocals
- Matt Brandyberry – rap vocals, keyboards, rhythm guitar, bass
- Lance Dowdle – lead guitar, bass
- Mat Madiro – drums

Production

- Colin Brittain – producer

== Charts ==
| Chart (2020) | Peak position |
|---|---|
| US Mainstream Rock (Billboard) | 11 |
| US Rock & Alternative Airplay (Billboard) | 42 |
