= Through It All =

Single by From Ashes to New

from the album Downfall EP and Day One
- Released: November 21, 2015
- Length: 3:33
- Label: Eleven Seven
- Songwriters: From Ashes to New; Grant McFarland
- Producer: Grant McFarland

From Ashes to New singles chronology
"Downfall" (2015)	"Through It All" (2015)	"Same Old Story" (2016)

Music video
- "Through It All" on YouTube

"Through It All" is the first single by American rock band From Ashes to New's Downfall EP and their debut album Day One. The single was first released on November 21, 2015. Since its release, the song has peaked at No. 6 on the Billboard Mainstream rock chart. The song was certified Gold by the RIAA on November 4, 2025.

== Music video ==
A lyric video was premiered on August 10, 2015. The music video was released on November 13, 2015 and was directed by Jim Forster. It features "a young couple going through some highs and lows in their relationship".

== Charts ==
Chart (2016)	Peak position
US Hot Rock & Alternative Songs (Billboard)	41
US Rock & Alternative Airplay (Billboard)	35

== Certifications ==
Region	Certification	Certified units/sales
United States (RIAA)	Gold	500,000^{‡}
^{‡} Sales+streaming figures based on certification alone.
