= Pussyhat =

Pink cat-ear beanie hat

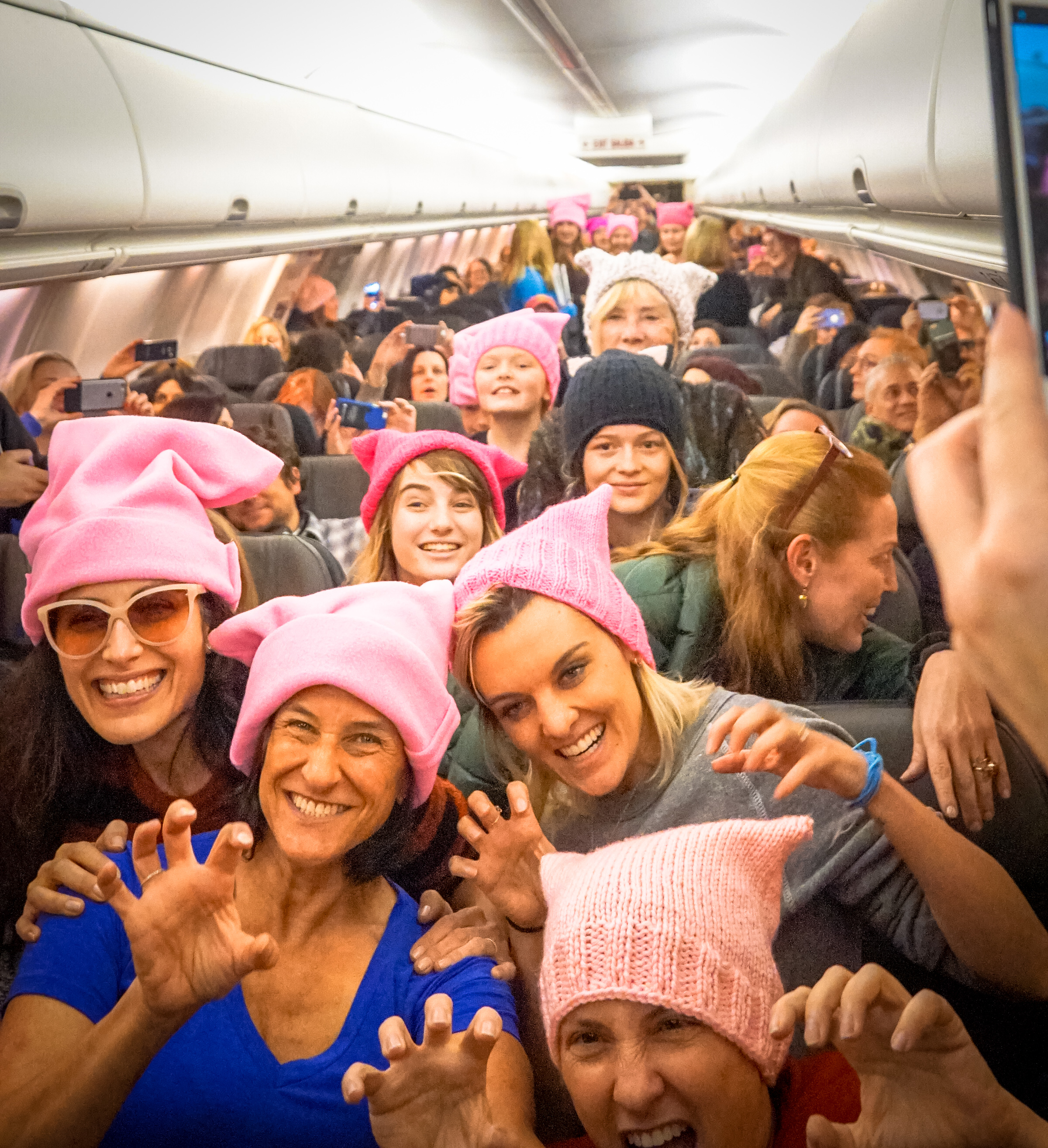
Sewn and knit pussyhats being worn on a plane to Washington, D.C.

A pussyhat is a pink, crafted brimless hat or cap, created in large numbers by women involved with the United States 2017 Women's March. They are the result of the Pussyhat Project, a nationwide effort initiated by Krista Suh and Jayna Zweiman, a screenwriter and architect located in Los Angeles, to create pink hats to be worn at the march.

In response to this call, crafters all over the United States began making these hats using patterns provided on the project Web site for use with either a knitting method, crocheting and even sewing with fabrics. The project's goal was to have one million hats handed out at the Washington March. The hats are made using pink yarns or fabrics and were originally designed to be a positive form of protest for Trump's inauguration by Krista Suh. Suh, from Los Angeles, wanted a hat for the cooler climate in Washington, D.C. and made a hat for herself to wear at the Women's March, realizing the potential: "We could all wear them, make a unified statement". One of the project founders, Jayna Zweiman, stated "I think it's resonating a lot because we're really saying that no matter who you are or where you are, you can be politically active." Suh and Zweiman worked with Kat Coyle, the owner of a local knitting supply shop called The Little Knittery, to come up with the original design. The project launched in November 2016 and quickly became popular on social media with over 100,000 downloads of the pattern to make the hat.

== Origins ==
Suh and Zweiman started the project in 2016, while Zweiman was recovering from a head injury. As she could not attend the Women's March during this period, Zweiman wished to create a visual symbol of protest as a contribution.

Designer Kat Coyle intended the Pussyhat to be easily replicable, giving it a simple pattern. Referring to how participants would appear at the Women's March, the project was envisioned as "a sea of pink, with each individual choosing their own shade, yet being part of a collective."

The idea for the Pussyhat Project emerged after the 2016 United States presidential election as a way to create a visible symbol of solidarity for women's rights. Suh and Zweiman, launched the project with the goal of providing pink, cat-eared hats for participants in the Women's March on Washington in January 2017. The project quickly gained momentum, with people around the world knitting and wearing pussyhats as a symbol of support for women's rights, reproductive rights, and opposition to the policies of the Trump administration.

== Name ==
The creators state that the name refers to the resemblance of the top corners of the hats to cat ears while also attempting to reclaim the term pussy, a play on Trump's widely reported 2005 remarks that women would let him "grab them by the pussy." Many of the hats worn by marchers in Washington, D.C., were created by crafters who were unable to attend and wished them to be worn by those who could, to represent their presence. Those hats optionally contained notes from the crafters to the wearers, expressing support. They were distributed by the crafters, by yarn stores at the points of origin, carried to the event by marchers, and also distributed at the destination. The production of the hats caused reported shortages of pink knitting yarn across the United States. On the day of the march, NPR compared the hats to the "Make America Great Again" hats worn by Trump supporters, in that both represented groups that had at one point been politically marginalized; both sent "simultaneously unifying and antagonistic" messages; and both were simple in their messages.

== Criticisms ==
=== Racism and transphobia charges ===
Critics have insisted that the hats should be evaluated not as a symbolic political parody but instead according to a visual measure of inclusion, that is, by how realistically they represent the anatomy of all potential participants. In particular, criticism has noted how the hats do not represent the anatomy of transgender women (who do not have a vulva) or women of color whose "genitals are more likely to be brown than pink".

Professor Cáel Keegan, who teaches Women, Gender and Sexuality Studies at Grand Valley State University in Michigan, said the hat's reference to pink vulvas was politically problematic for trans people: "any time feminism starts centering people based on anatomy, that gets kind of dangerous for trans people" who are also fighting for autonomy over their own bodies. He added that the knitted pink hats also do not reflect the anatomy of transgender women who have not opted for vaginoplasty surgery.

Others have criticized the Pussyhat Project for reflecting white feminist interests more than intersectional feminism or wider radical activism. This critique says it is problematic that the Pussyhat Project "galvanized the interest and action of hundreds of thousands of (white and middle-class) American women." Shannon Black, in an article in Gender, Place & Culture, notes the criticism of the premise of the Pussyhat Project being "as if women's rights are the most important cause in our nation." Critics argue that the participants in the Pussyhat Project represented one demographic group; its strong association with white middle class women could result in other groups feeling left out from an issue that personally affected them as well and discourage their participation.

In response to such criticisms, one of the two women who initiated the project responded: "I never thought that by calling it the 'pussyhat' that it was saying that women's issues are predicated on the possession of the pussy."" The creators, one of whom is Asian American, have said that the hat was not intended as a realistic representation of anatomy and that the color pink was meant to play on strong association of pink with femininity, as well as "caring, compassion, and love".

=== Representation issues ===
Racism and transphobia charges have generated concern surrounding who was welcome to don a pussyhat. "While the project states that 'people with any genital anatomy can be feminists,' the context in which it does so leaves it ambiguous as to whether individuals that identify as men, and not as women, are included in their assertion." As a result, the question of whether men could wear a pussyhat as a visual sign of solidarity with the Women's March and feminism arose.

=== Playful nature ===
In addition, some critics have noted that the pussyhat's emphasis on being "cute, kitsch, and crafty" may "discourage more critical modes of thinking and acting" and take away from the seriousness of the issue of women's rights. The creation may also come across as both too playful and too feminine which may have resulted and continue to result in the dismissal of the project.

=== Vulgarity ===
As a result of the immense outreach of the Pussyhat Project, local yarn and knitting supply stores experienced an influx of customers. However, several store owners expressed their frustrations with the Pussyhat. In a viral Facebook post that received international attention, one store owner stated, "With the recent women's march on Washington, I ask that if you want yarn for any project for the women's movement that you please shop for yarn elsewhere. The vulgarity, vile and evilness of this movement is absolutely despicable. That kind of behavior is unacceptable and is not welcomed at The Joy of Knitting." In a media interview, she also stated "I think if you want to get your point across you need to do it the right way and I just think that walking around dressed as a vulva is gross." Many agreed with the store owner's point that the hat's name was too vulgar and inappropriate and thus discredited the project.

== In popular culture ==
Pussyhats were featured months after the 2017 march on the Missoni fashion runway. Models were outfitted with pink hats combined with zigzag-striped ribbing as they walked the runway, and at the end of the show, Angela Missoni and celebrities wore the hats as well. She called the collection "pink is the new black" and donated some of the proceeds from the collection to the American Civil Liberties Union and the UN Refugee Agency.

The hats appeared on the covers of Time magazine and The New Yorker. The New Yorker had a painting of an African-American woman wearing a knit pussyhat, flexing her bared arm on its February 6, 2017, cover, in the style of the woman on the 1943 We Can Do It! poster (often mistakenly referred to as Rosie the Riveter). The painting, named "The March", was created by Abigail Gray Swartz, who marched in Augusta, Maine. The image was subsequently made available for sale on prints, mugs, t-shirts and other items.

Saturday Night Live had several skits in which pussyhats appeared. Its January 21, 2017, episode showed a distressed Russian woman putting on a hat and tiptoeing behind Vladimir Putin as he talked about Russia's recent "purchase" of the United States via the election. Another episode, hosted by Jessica Chastain, showed Aidy Bryant in the audience wearing a pussyhat.

== See also ==
- Melt the ICE Hat
- List of hat styles
