= Panic (From Ashes to New album) =

Studio album by From Ashes to New
- Released: August 28, 2020
- Recorded: 2019–2020
- Genre: Nu metal
- Length: 35:43
- Label: Better Noise
- Producers: Colin Brittain; Erik Ron

From Ashes to New chronology
The Future (2018)	Panic (2020)	Blackout (2023)

Singles from Panic
- 1. "Panic" Released: April 17, 2020; 2. "What I Get" Released: June 5, 2020; 3. "Scars That I'm Hiding" Released: August 3, 2020

Panic is the third studio album by American rock band From Ashes to New. It was released on August 28, 2020. The first single, "Panic", released ahead of the album in April 2020, and has since peaked in the top 20 of the Billboard Mainstream Rock Songs chart.

== Background and recording ==
Writing and recording for the album took place across 2019. Contrary to prior albums, the recording sessions feature the exact same lineup as their prior album, band members appreciated, with lineup changes and departures plaguing the band for years prior. The band chose to work with music producer Colin Brittain on the album; the band had previously worked with Brittain on a single song, "Nowhere to Run", on their prior album The Future (2018), and been happy with the results, and wished to collaborate with him for an entire album this time around. The band additionally chose to work with producer Erik Ron on two tracks, first single "Panic" and "Wait for Me", liking the "dynamic style" Ron had brought to Godsmack's When Legends Rise (2018) album.

Three songs were released prior to the album's release. In April 2020, the band released their first single, "Panic", along with an accompanying music video. The video, created during the early stages of the COVID-19 pandemic, was barely finished before the quarantine and shutdown of the state of New York, where it was filmed. A second song, "What I Get", was released on June 5, 2020. A third song, "Scars That I'm Hiding", was released on August 3, 2020. A version of the song featuring guest vocals by In Flames vocalist Anders Friden will appear on the soundtrack for the feature film The Retaliators, while the album version will not feature the guest vocals.

== Themes and composition ==
The album's sound was compared to the earlier work of Linkin Park. The track "Panic" was originally written as a song just generally about dealing with anxiety and depression, but retroactively was interpreted as being about dealing with COVID-19 pandemic due to the timing of its release. "What I Get" was described as "melodic alternative rock".

== Reception ==
Wall of Sound praised the album, comparing the album's sound to Linkin Park, concluding that "...it must be super hard to be frequently compared to such a huge music icon like Linkin Park but From Ashes to New do a great job in pulling it off. They've added heavy metal and innovative electronic components to make it their own fresh sound, creating a record that should not only be a big hit now, but a big hit for years to come."

== Track listing ==
No.	Title	Length
1.	"Scars That I'm Hiding"	2:55
2.	"Brick"	3:24
3.	"What I Get"	3:03
4.	"Blind"	2:45
5.	"SideFX"	4:07
6.	"Panic"	3:21
7.	"Wait for Me"	3:09
8.	"Bulletproof"	3:27
9.	"Nothing"	3:08
10.	"Death of Me"	3:00
11.	"Change My Past"	3:24
Total length:		35:43

== Personnel ==
Band

- Danny Case – lead vocals
- Matt Brandyberry – rap vocals, keyboards, rhythm guitar, bass, clean vocals on "Wait for Me"
- Lance Dowdle – lead guitar, bass
- Mat Madiro – drums

Production

- Colin Brittain – producer
- Erik Ron – additional production on "Panic" and "Wait for Me"
- Nik Trekov – engineering

== Chart performance ==
Chart (2020)	Peak position
US Top Current Album Sales (Billboard)	45
US Top Album Sales (Billboard)	69
US Top Hard Rock Albums (Billboard)	23
UK Albums Downloads (Official Charts)	68
