= Don't =

Don't, Dont, or DONT may refer to:

== Films ==
- Don't (1925 film), a 1925 silent comedy film
- Don't (1974 film), a 1974 film about the monarch butterfly
- Don't, a fake trailer from the film Grindhouse (2007)

== Songs ==
- "Don't" (Billy Currington song)
- "Don't" (Bryson Tiller song)
- "Don't", by Dinosaur Jr. from their album Bug, 1988
- "Don't" (Ed Sheeran song)
- "Don't" (Elvis Presley song)
- "Don't!", a song by Shania Twain
- "Don't", by M2M from their album The Big Room
- "Honey Don't, Carl Perkins song

== Surname ==
Dont or Dohnt is a German language surname

- Jakob Dont (1815–1888), Austrian composer
- Jay Dohnt (born 1989), Australian Paralympics athlete

== Other uses ==
- Don't (game show), a 2020 American game show with Adam Scott and Ryan Reynolds
- DONT, Disturb Opponents' Notrump, a bridge bidding convention
- "-dont" (actually "-odont"), a suffix meaning "tooth", used in taxonomy
- Doctor Don't, the teenage kid version of Doctor Eggman, from New Yoke City, in Sonic Prime

== See also ==
- Contraction (grammar)
- Do (verb)
