= The Future (From Ashes to New album) =

Studio album by From Ashes to New
- Released: April 20, 2018
- Genre: Nu metal
- Length: 39:52
- Label: Eleven Seven
- Producer: Nicholas Furlong; Grant McFarland; Carson Slovak

From Ashes to New chronology
Day One (2016)	The Future (2018)	Panic (2020)

Singles from The Future
- 1. "Crazy" Released: February 1, 2018; 2. "Broken" Released: March 9, 2018

The Future is the second studio album by American rock band From Ashes to New. The album was released on April 20, 2018. It is the first studio album by the band after the departure of lead vocalist Chris Musser and drummer Tim D'Onofrio, introducing Danny Case and Mat Madiro as the new vocalist and drummer. Promotional singles for the album, "Crazy" and "Broken", were released before the official album release.

== Background ==
In February 2016, From Ashes to New released their first album Day One. While on tour for Day One, lead singer Chris Musser and drummer Tim D’Onofrio left the band. At the time, From Ashes to New had not started writing The Future. Danny Case was chosen as the new lead singer while Mat Madiro, who temporarily played with the band during a 2016 tour, became their new drummer. In February 2018, the album's title and release date were announced.

== Writing ==
In previous From Ashes to New works, keyboardist and rapper Matt Brandyberry primarily wrote the band's songs. However, on The Future, the rest of the band joined Brandyberry and contributed to the writing stage. Case mentioned to MusicExistence that he believed that From Ashes to New had a quarter of the album done before he and Madiro joined the band as their new members.

== Recording ==
From Ashes to New recorded The Future alongside Grant McFarland and Carson Slovak at Atrium Audio. McFarland and Slovak were co-writers and co-producers of the band's previous album Day One. For The Future, the duo was joined by producer Nicholas Furlong who was a co-writer of "Nowhere to Run".

== Promotion ==
On February 1, 2018, the lyric video for the band's first single "Crazy" was released. A month later, a music video for "Crazy" came out on March 3. From Ashes to New's second single "Broken" debuted with a lyric video on March 9 before the release of The Future on April 20. An accompanying music video for "Broken" premiered on August 14 months after The Future came out.

== Tour ==
In August 2018, From Ashes to New announced a tour of the United States to be held from September 16 to October 14, 2018.

== Reception ==
Neil Z. Yeung of AllMusic felt The Future was a mixture of the band's previous genres with addition of electronic music. In a more mixed review, Sam Law of Kerrang! felt the mixture of genres sounded "more like the product of some considered planning meeting than textured, individual personalities" and gave the album three out of five.

== Track listing ==
No.	Title	Length
1.	"Wake Up"	3:50
2.	"Crazy"	3:05
3.	"My Name"	3:42
4.	"Gone Forever"	3:54
5.	"Broken"	3:20
6.	"Forgotten"	3:50
7.	"Enemy"	3:16
8.	"Nowhere to Run"	3:34
9.	"Let Go"	3:53
10.	"On My Own"	3:22
11.	"The Future"	3:45
Total length:		39:52

== Personnel ==
- Danny Case – lead vocals, acoustic guitar
- Matt Brandyberry – rap vocals, rhythm guitar, bass, keyboards, piano, programming
- Lance Dowdle – lead guitar, bass
- Mat Madiro – drums, percussion

Production

- Nicholas Furlong – producer
- Grant McFarland – co-producer, engineering
- Carson Slovak – co-producer, engineering
- Josh Wilbur – mixing
- Kyle McAulay – assistant engineering
- Ted Jensen – mastering
- Rob McDermott – executive producer
- Adam Serrano – art direction

Additional musicians

- Rowan Brandyberry – backing vocals
- Roan Brooks – backing vocals
- Gerald Brown – backing vocals
- Makaila Kecki – backing vocals
- Mia Kecki – backing vocals

== Charts ==
Chart (2018)	Peak position
US Billboard 200	163
US Top Rock Albums (Billboard)	38
US Top Alternative Albums (Billboard)	18
US Top Hard Rock Albums (Billboard)	14
US Independent Albums (Billboard)	10
