= Sarah Corbett (activist) =

English speaker, author and activist

Sarah P. Corbett
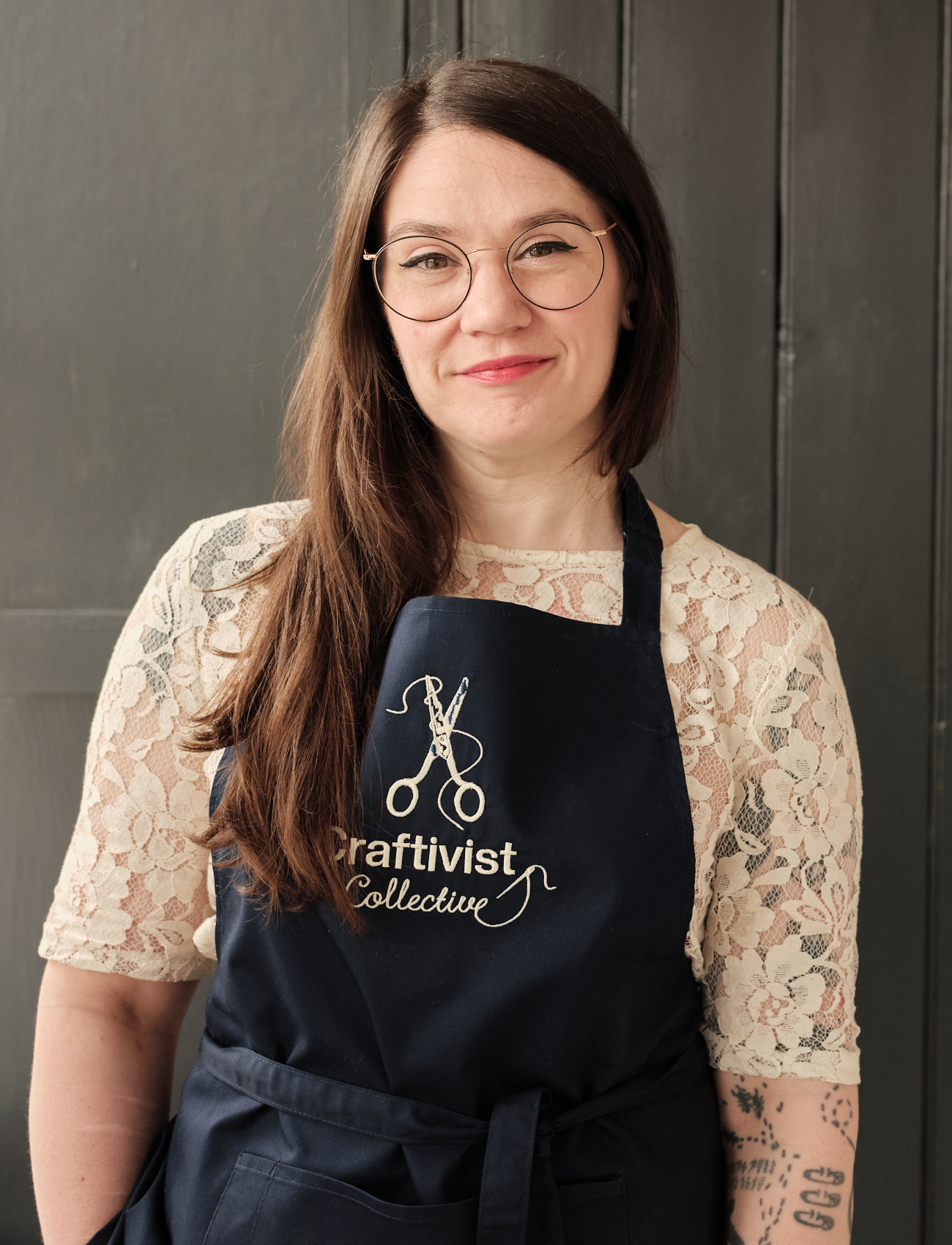
- Corbett in 2023
- Born: West Everton, Liverpool, England, UK
- Known for: Founder of Craftivist Collective and gentle protest

Sarah Corbett is an English activist, author, speaker, and the founder of Craftivist Collective. Corbett is known for developing the 'gentle protest' approach to activism, and coining the term 'gentle protest'.

In 2020 she was featured in Forbes' list of 100 UK Leading Environmentalists (Who Happen To Be Women).

She is a lifelong Ashoka fellow and in 2022 was awarded an honorary degree from Goldsmiths.

Her work is based on psychology and neuroscience, and her style is becoming a critical friend to those in power.

== Background ==
Corbett grew up in West Everton in Liverpool in the 1980s, when it was one of the most deprived wards in the UK. Her mother is a local councillor in Liverpool and her father is a vicar. Her parents have been a big influence on Corbett's politics, for example by taking her to South Africa as a child and on protests to save local housing from demolition. She has said "All we ever do around the kitchen table is talk about religion and politics."

At school Corbett was voted Head Girl and successfully campaigned for lockers for students. She studied at the University of Manchester where she was active in numerous campaign groups. After graduating she took a course on grassroots community action based on the work of Steve Biko. She went on to work for various international charities in their youth and community programmes and campaigns departments, including Christian Aid and the Department for International Development. In 2011 she worked on campaigns for Oxfam in London. In 2012 she went part-time at Oxfam to devote more time to the Craftivist Collective.

Corbett is a Christian who says faith plays a role in her craftivism and that she has "learnt to act out my faith rather than just talk about it".

One of Corbett's most distinctive features is her tattooed arms, which include a pair of scissors wrapped in thread, a sewing needle, measuring tape, and safety pins. The 'craft tattoos' remind her of "what I do and why and to make sure I keep going."

== Craftivism ==
Corbett has "a huge passion for craft". She has no formal training as an artist or craftsperson, saying "I can do it anyone can do it." Her main craft is cross-stitch, which she often uses to make mini-protest banners. She has described her work as using "creativity to make the public aware of the struggles people are still going through".

== Books ==
- A Little Book of Craftivism, published in 2013 by Cicada.
- How To Be A Craftivist, published in 2017 by Unbound.
- Canary Craftivists Manual, self-published in 2021.
- Craftivist Collective Handbook: 20 craft projects to help to make a positive difference in our world, due to be published in 2024 by Unbound.

== Exhibitions ==
=== Solo exhibitions ===
- 'Gentle Protest' in Stockholm
- 'Gentle Protest' at Helsinki Design Week

=== Group exhibitions ===
- 'Article 31.1' at Workshop 44
- 'Renegade Potters and Extreme Craft' at Ink_d
- 'Riot Here, Riot Now' at W3 Gallery
- 'Spoken Threads' in New York and Los Angeles

== Talks and lectures ==
Corbett's 2016 talk Activism Needs Introverts was featured on the TED homepage in November 2017 and has generated over 1 million views since.

Corbett has also spoken about craftivism at:

- TedX
- Salon London
- Lost Lectures
- Sunday Wise at The Ivy
- The Victoria and Albert Museum
- Women's Institutes
- Parsons The New School for Design
- Leeds College of Art
- Maker Faire

She's participated in a project with Falmouth University and been a Twitter chair and guest blogger for the British Museum.

== Writing ==
Corbett has written columns and blogs for:

- Crafty Magazine
- MrXStitch.com
- Campaign Central

== Media ==
Corbett was featured on Stitched Stories, a documentary by Northern Productions. She was also a panellist discussing 'Not Knowing' for the Lush Speakeasy podcast.

In April 2026, Corbett was interviewed for the National Museums Liverpool podcast speaking about her history as an activist and the effectiveness of The Craftivist Collective
