= Ruwanthi Gajadeera =

Sri Lankan sustainable fashion designer

- රුවන්ති පවිත්‍රා ගජධීර ருவந்தி பவித்ரா கஜதீர
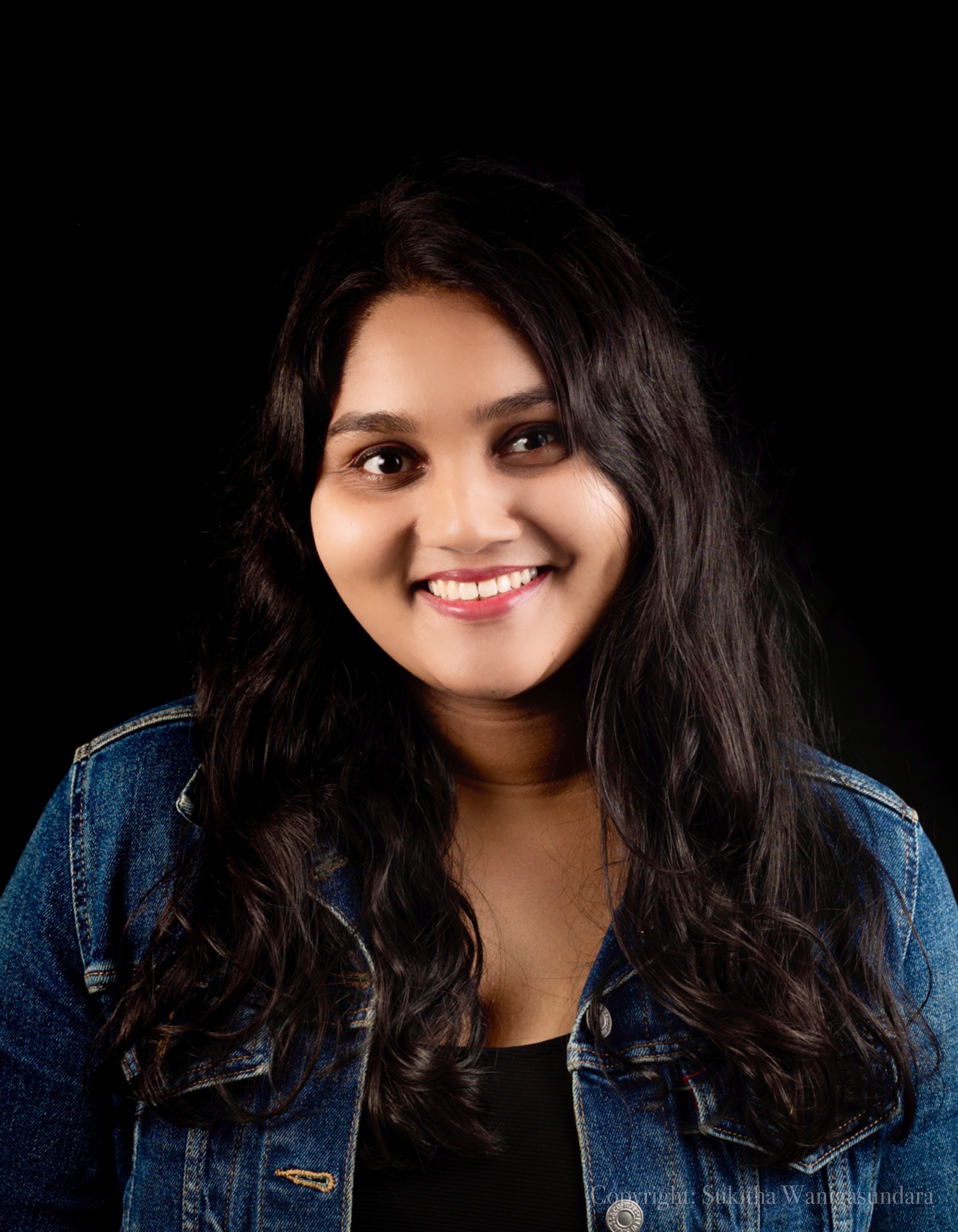
- Born: 20 August 1996; Sri Jayawardenepura Kotte, Sri Lanka
- Education: Northumbria University, University of Moratuwa, Ladies' College, Colombo
- Occupation: Fashion designer
- Years active: 2020-present
- Label: kǣli

Ruwanthi Gajadeera (Sinhala: රුවන්ති පවිත්‍රා ගජධීර, Tamil: ருவந்தி பவித்ரா கஜதீர; born 20 August 1996) is a Sri Lankan sustainable fashion and textile designer. She is the first South Asian fashion designer to win the Taiwan Fashion Design Awards at 2021 Taipei Fashion Week SS22. She has also represented Sri Lanka in a variety of other international competitions such as Redress Design Awards 2021, Hong Kong, International Baltic Ethnic Fashion Festival 2021, Saint Petersburg and Graduate Fashion Week 2021, London.

Through her designs, she attempts to communicate the importance of the slow fashion movement. She approached her aesthetic from the perspective by incorporating generational qualities of fashion and Buddhist philosophies. Ruwanthi's garments have showcased a combination of heritage crafts and high-tech techniques that express 3Rs (Reduce, Reuse and Recycle) in the complete garment lifecycle. She states that to create circular garments, she employs zero-waste, up-cycling, reconstruction techniques.

== Early life and education ==
Ruwanthi was born in Colombo to a Buddhist family. Ruwanthi spent her early childhood in Padiyathalawa, a town in Amapara. Later on, she moved to Colombo and studied at Ladies' College, Colombo. Upon completing her primary education she entered the University of Moratuwa to study landscape architecture, but later she became more interested in fashion and textile design. She dropped out of the University of Moratuwa and pursued her career in fashion design.

== Awards ==
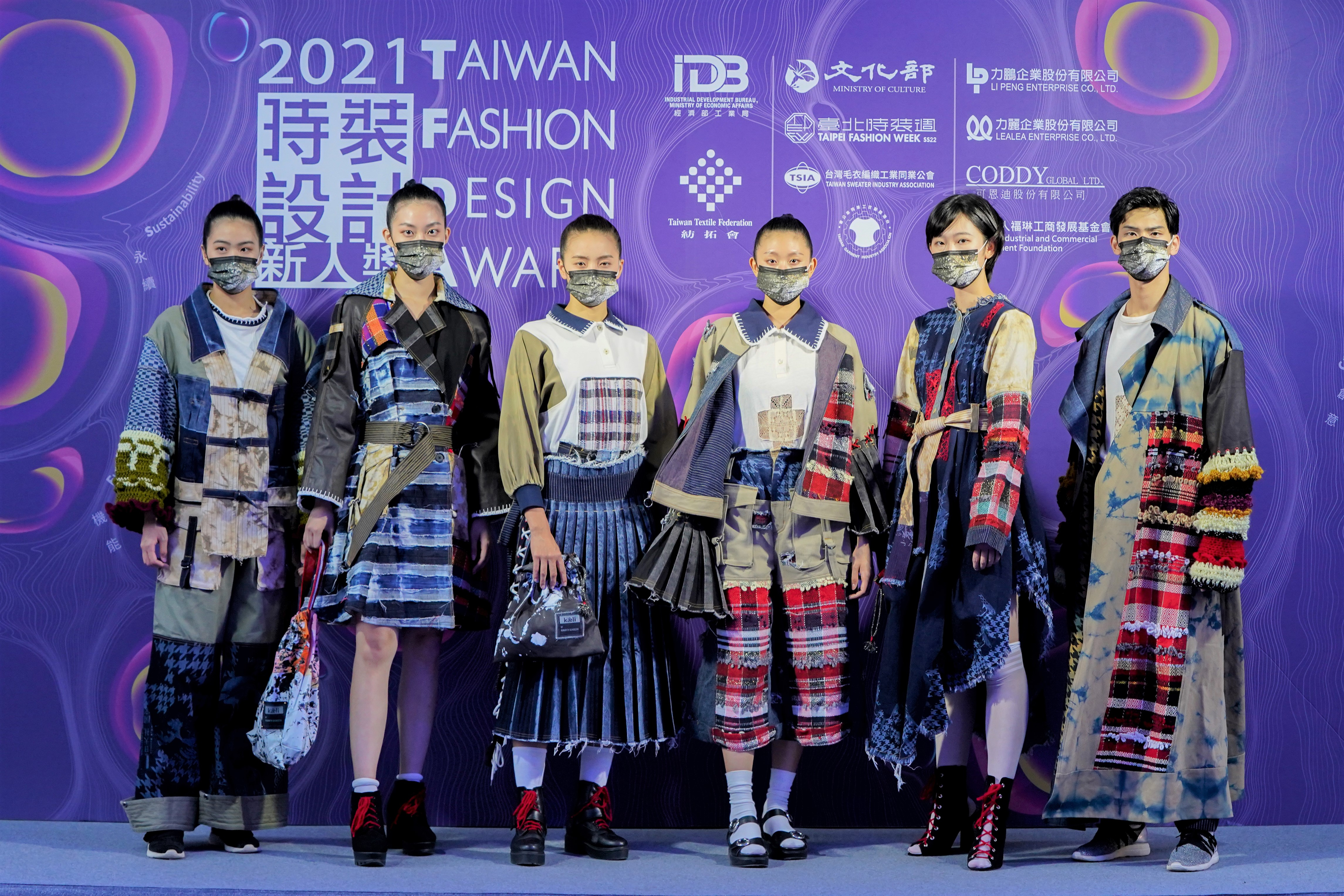
2021 Fashion Design Newcomer Award-First Prize Collection "kǣli"

- Fashion Design Newcomer Award - Taiwan Fashion Design Awards (2021).
- First Prize in Eco Fashion - International Baltic Ethnic Fashion Festival (2021).
- First Runner-Up - International Catwalk Award at Graduate Fashion Week (2021).
- Semi-finalist - Redress Design Award (2021).
