= FFFACE.ME =

International augmented reality studio

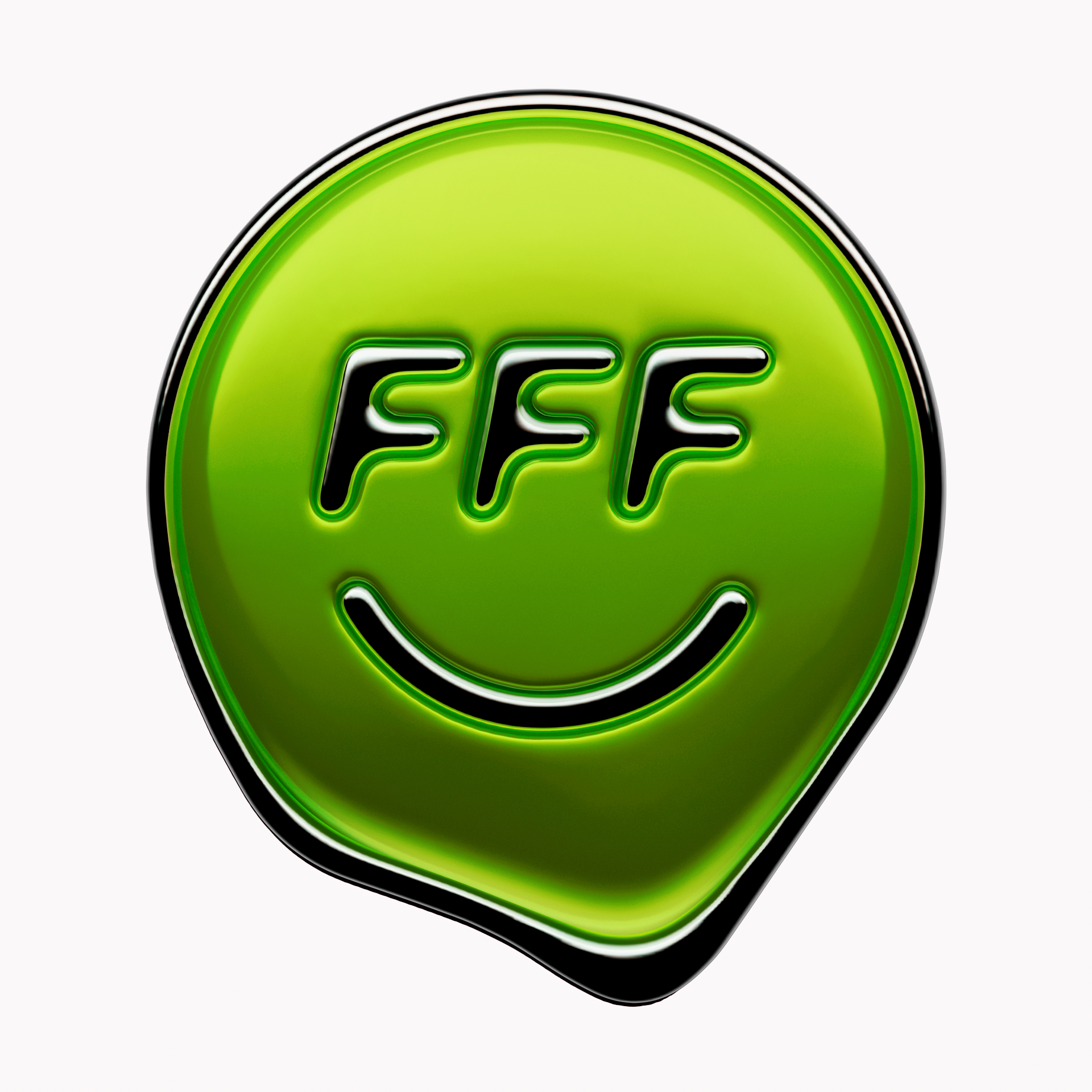
- Type: Private
- Founded: 2019
- Founder: Dmytro Kornilov
- Headquarters: London, United Kingdom
- Website: https://ffface.me/

FFFACE.ME is an international studio that creates AR filters and mirrors, digital fashion and beauty products, AI and Mixed Reality projects for brands' marketing communications.

Among the clients of FFFACE.ME are brands such as L’Oreal, Prada Beauty, MUGLER Beauty, Bershka, Clarins, Marc Jacobs, Ralph Lauren, Fendi, Puig, Hugo Boss, Dolce&Gabbana Beauty, Pepsi, Puma, Visa, Meta, Avon, Maybelline, Wella, La Roche-Posay, Porsche, and more.

== History ==
FFFACE.ME was founded by Dmytro Kornilov and Yegor Kumachov in June 2019 and initially focused on Instagram filters. Later, the studio shifted its focus to popularising AR mirrors and Semi-digital clothing among fashion and beauty brands.

In June 2020 FFFACE.ME in collaboration with Ukrainian brand Finch presented the world’s first capsule of semi-digital clothing.

In October 2020, FFFACE.ME collaborated with Ukrainian brand FINCH to create the world's first immersive fashion collection, allowing users to virtually give a go on looks via Instagram globally.

In 2021, FFFACE.ME introduced Europe's first virtual influencer Astra Starr.

In February 2021, the studio and apparel brand FINCH collaborated with 5 international digital artists, muralists, and designers to create a semi-digital clothing collection. Scanning the QR code printed on each item in the collection activates the AR component for that piece. The collection was presented at Dubai Expo in 2021 and at Milan Fashion Week in 2022.

In January 2023 FFFACE.ME became the official partner of Meta.

In April 5, 2023, FFFACE.ME collaborated with Bershka to introduce the world's first semi-digital clothing collection for the mass market. The "Wearable Art" collection was presented in the new Bershka store in Lisbon. Customers can add digital elements to specific physical garments using the Instagram filter. Following this, two more collections were presented: one in Milan in 2023, and another in Mexico in 2024.

In May 2023, FFFACE.ME introduced its latest innovative product - AR Mirrors. To promote Mugler's new fragrance Angel Elixir, the French brand created a series of interactive XR installations, which digitally apply the Angel Elixir effect on visitors of Charles de Gaulle Airport in Paris, Alexa Mall in Berlin, and PEP Mall in Munich.

In June 2023, FFFACE.ME became the first official partner of Metaverse Beauty World, assuming responsibility for AR Mirror integration.

In September 2023, FFFACE.ME launched a project for PRADA Beauty set against the backdrop of the Paris Opera. The project featured AR Mirrors with two Prada Paradoxe fragrances bottles. Visitors could see their reflections altered by an AR Filter and immediately receive a photo of the experience.

On October 11, FFFACE.ME collaborated with Maybelline New York to launch an augmented reality (AR) installation for Maybelline's Falsies Surreal mascara. FFFACE.ME implemented the world's largest AR mirror, covering 4,000 square meters on the facade of Gulliver Mall in Kyiv, Ukraine.

In October 2023, FFFACE.ME, in collaboration with digital artist Ines Alpha, created an official Instagram filter for The Rolling Stones' album release, providing fans with a new method to interact with the band's music and artistic concept.

In April 2024, FFFACE.ME collaborated with Dolce&Gabbana to present its latest make-up collection in New York City.

In April 2024, to support the launch of Polo Est. 67 Eau de Toilette by Ralph Lauren Fragrances FFFACE.ME launched a cross-platform XR campaign in offline retail and social media.

In April 2024, FFFACE.ME presented the world's first semi-digital jeans collection, which includes 5 items with AR layers.
