= Ecocitex =

Chilean textile recycling company

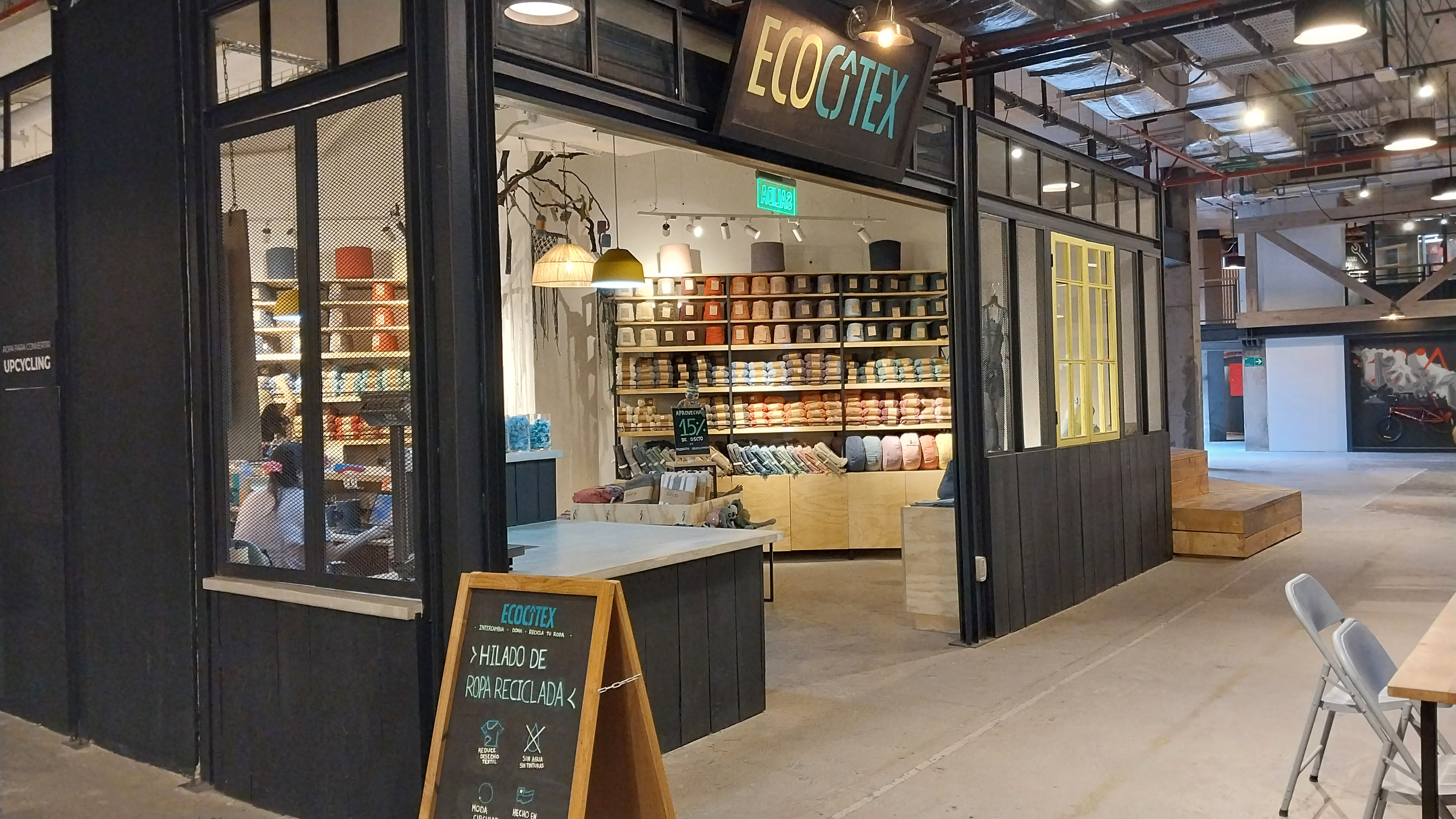
- Founded: 2020
- Founder: Rosario Hevia
- Website: www.ecocitex.cl

Ecocitex is a Chilean textile recycling company, which sells second-hand clothes and accessories created from second-hand clothes in poor condition, and produces and sells recycled yarn from second-hand clothes in poor condition.

== Context ==
The textile industry is a particularly polluting industry, which is responsible for 10% of greenhouse gas emissions in the world. In Chile, approximately 550 tonnes of textiles end up in landfills every year.

== Creation and history of the company ==
The Ecocitex company was born in 2020, as a means of industrially recovering textiles in poor condition received by the second-hand textile company Travieso. In September 2019, that company, created by Rosario Hevia and Daniela Ehijo, had more than 400 kilograms of clothes in poor condition, and after discovering an old spinning machinery, Rosario Hevia tried to create a yarn from these clothes, and succeeded in making it and then in selling it in the Travieso shop. Rosario Hevia and four other partners then bought the spinning factory, which was bankrupt, and created Ecocitex. Rosario Hevia became its general manager.

The name Ecocitex comes from economía circular textil (circular textile economy).

In June 2023, a fire affected the factory, and the company lost nine of its machines, the entire inventory as well as the store, all located in the commune of Macul.

== Recycling process and environmental impact ==
Ecocitex receives all types of clothing, which is then sorted: those in good condition are sold or given away, those in poor condition are transformed into hats or accessories and those in very poor condition are used for recycling. These are sorted again, this time by color, cut into pieces, shredded, then spun again to become recycled yarn.

The process does not use water or dye.

In 2023, the company indicated that it recycled 4 tonnes of clothing per month but had a capacity of 20 tonnes.

== Economic model ==
The company sells clothing in good condition as well as transformed clothing and recycled yarn. Ecocitex is loss-making during its first three years of operation. In 2021, the general manager indicated that the company “receives more clothes than it recycles and recycles more than it sells”.

In 2023, the company made three months of profits, but the partners still do not receive a salary.

== Social impact ==
The company employs women prisoners and people in social reintegration for part of the process, and works for this with the Abriendo Puertas foundation.
