= Fast fashion =

Fashion made quickly and cheaply

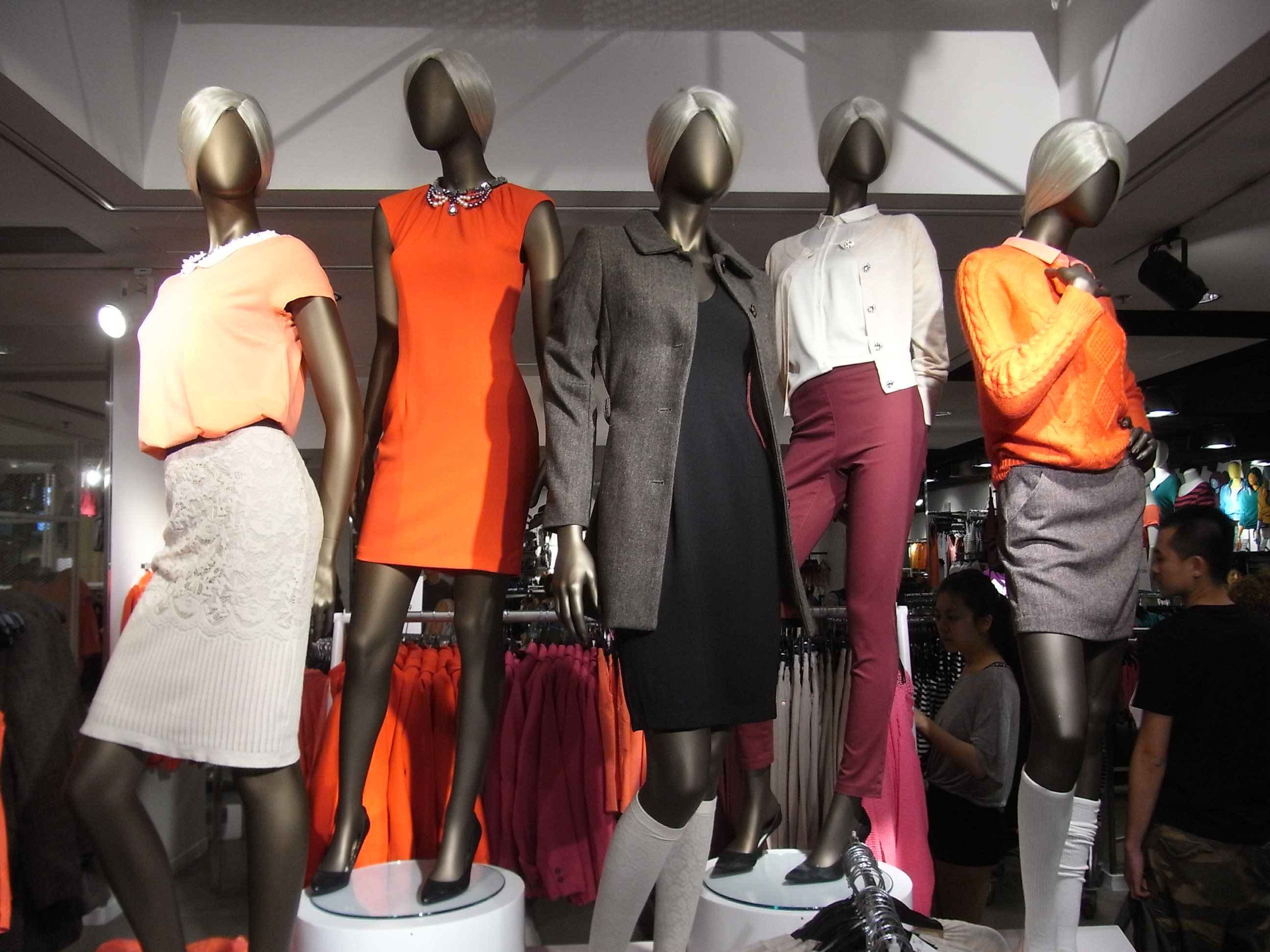
Clothing display at H&M department store, Hong Kong

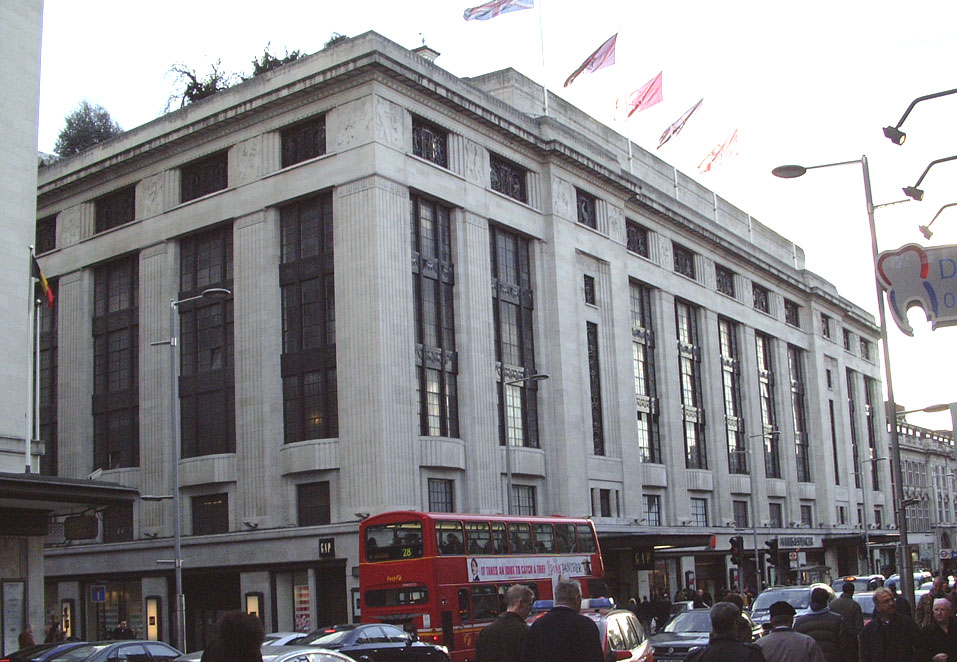
The former "Big Biba" building, c. 2006

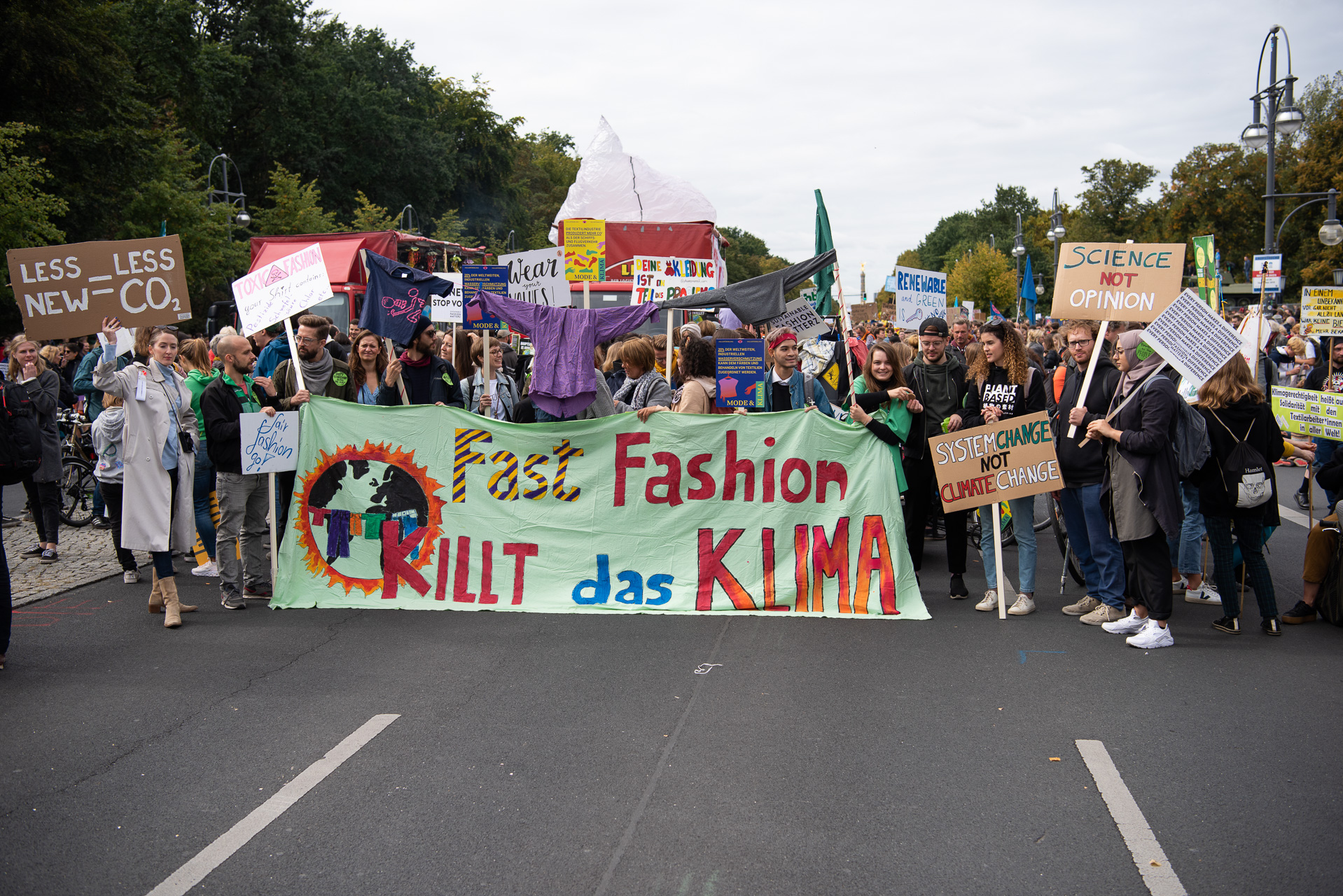
Protest on environmental impact of fast fashion

Fast fashion or ready-to-wear (RTW) (also prêt-à-porter) is a business model in textile manufacturing where companies quickly create and sell clothing and footwear at affordable prices by replicating the latest fashion trends and designs using cheap and fast mass production techniques. Fast fashion is defined by Merriam-Webster as "an approach to the design, creation, and marketing of clothing fashions that emphasizes making fashion trends quickly and cheaply available to consumers."

Multinational retailers that employ the fast fashion strategy include Shein, Temu, H&M, ASOS, Peacocks, Fashion Nova, Forever 21, Uniqlo, Edikted, Zaraand C&A.

As of 2026, 36% of clothing purchases worldwide are of the fast fashion category. The total market size of fast fashion clothing sales is estimated at $178 billion in sales per year.

Fast fashion brands have faced legal and regulatory issues due to alleged exploitation of labour, use of dangerous goods in their products, greenwashing their environmental impacts, and violations of intellectual property laws.

== Business model ==
Fast fashion brands aim to put popular styles on the market as quickly as possible at a lower price than their competitors via optimized supply chains and quick response manufacturing methods. These retailers produce and sell products in small batches, maintain surplus manufacturing capacity to adjust production levels, use category management organization, and are able to make substantial and immediate adjustments to manufacturing based on sales. Fast fashion companies generally invest heavily in marketing, particularly via social media, using influencers and internet celebrities to promote their brand.

The supply chains force factories into price competition for fear of losing business. This decreases financial risk from brands in fast fashion, while taking advantage of poorly regulated labor laws in manufacturing companies. The business model overall depends on vulnerable workers that endure wage suppression and an unsafe work environment. These unethical standards are capitalized when businesses bargain for extremely cheap prices with large expectations.

== History ==
Before the 19th century, fashion was a laborious, time-consuming process that required sourcing raw materials like wool, cotton, or leather, weaving the natural fibers into fabric, and then fashioning the fabric into functional garments. However, the Industrial Revolution changed the world of fashion by introducing new technology like the sewing machine and textile machines.

As a result, clothes became cheaper and easier to make and buy. Localized dressmaking businesses emerged, catering to members of the middle class, and employing workroom employees along with garment workers, who worked from home for meager wages. These dress shops were early prototypes of the so-called 'sweatshops' that would become the foundation for twenty-first-century clothing production.

Fast fashion originated with utility clothing and tailors who sold mass-produced affordable suits for men. In the 1960s, companies including Inditex and Chelsea Girl attained commercial acumen, but the brand Biba endured as a fast fashion icon.

Before the popularization of the fast fashion model, the fashion industry traditionally operated on a four-season cycle, with designers working months in advance to anticipate customer preferences. However, this approach underwent a significant transformation in the 1960s and 1970s, as the younger generations began to create new trends. During this period there was still a clear distinction between luxury goods and High Street fashion.

Fast fashion grew during the late 20th century as the clothing industry adopted cheaper manufacturing techniques including more efficient supply chains, new quick response manufacturing methods, increased usage of low-cost labor from Asia, and cheaper petroleum-based synthetic fibers.

Fast fashion particularly came to the fore during the vogue for "Boho-chic" in the mid-2000s.

In the 2010s and 2020s, fast fashion trends spread quicker via social media services such as Instagram, Pinterest, and TikTok. Through the creation of promotional opportunities, such as haul videos from influencers, fast fashion companies have been able to advertise and market their clothing towards Generation-Z. As haul videos provide an emotional trigger that stimulates impulse buying, fast fashion brands and Shein in particular, are able to motivate their customers to engage in purchasing. This impulse purchasing is defined as overconsumption, which has led to an increase in the amount of clothing produced and allowed for clothing to be easily disposed of after a few wears. The increase in speed of production and trend cycles has been defined as ultra-fast fashion.. Many of the companies with a high social media presence, such as Shein, Fashion Nova, and PrettyLittleThing, promote ultra-fast fashion.

== Industrialization and Long-Term Economic Growth ==
Nobel Prize winner and economist Arthur Lewis believes an agriculture sector and manufacturing sector are essential in market development. He calls this a "Dual Sector Model" theory. It explains that emerging markets grow by shifting low-productivity agriculture labor into higher productive manufacturing labor. Economists apply this framework to the fast fashion industry as the manufacturing can serve as a starting point for industrialization. Through this shift, moving unskilled workers out of rural areas raises wages which ultimately can boost countries from poverty. Economists additionally note that investments from fast fashion companies in poor countries support broader economic growth and help fund infrastructure necessary to support long term national development. For instance, Industry leaders draw parallels to Chinas rapid industrialization in the late 20th century, where millions of workers moved from rural farming to more productive urban jobs. Now China has the worlds second largest economy. Economists argue that apparel manufacturing can similarly act as a catalyst to lift countries out of poverty.

Additionally, due to the massive scale, the fast fashion sector provides employment to roughly 60-70 million workers. Higher employment rates leads to more income that circulates in the economy.

== Consumer Experience ==
Classism involves prejudice based on a person's perceived social or economic situation. Opinions are formed about how many clothes someone has, what style they are wearing, or the quality of one's clothing. Fast fashion helps reduce classism by providing all individuals access to affordable clothing that is on trend. This means that lower income consumers can wear similar pieces to their peers, reducing class based discrimination, even if they own less clothes overall.

== Environmental impact ==
The high-volume and rapid-turnover model of fast fashion encourages consumers to purchase more clothes and replace them more frequently. According to the United Nations Environment Programme, consumers are buying approximately 60% more clothing than in the past while keeping garments for about half as long. The organization also reports that the equivalent of one truckload of discarded textiles is landfilled or incinerated every second.

The catalyst for this extreme production of material can be traced to the idea of overconsumption. With the excessive intake of goods that exceeds the true need, overconsumption leads to Americans discarding 68 pounds worth of textiles, cloth, and clothing per year. This piles up in landfills, which is made up of about 66% of clothing waste, according to the Environmental Protection Agency. Additionally, textiles accounted for 4% of municipal waste.

Environmental pressures occur throughout the textile supply chain, from fibre production and dyeing to manufacturing, transportation, use and disposal. A scientific review published in 2020 estimated that the fashion industry produces more than 92 million tonnes of waste and consumes approximately 79 trillion liters of water annually. The review identified water consumption, chemical pollution, carbon emissions and textile waste as major environmental impacts associated with the industry. Furthermore, the fashion industry is estimated to contribute approximately 2-8% of global greenhouse gas emissions. A 2024 study comparing fast-fashion and traditional jeans consumption estimated that the carbon footprint per wear of fast-fashion jeans was 11 times higher than that of traditional fashion consumption. A 2026 life cycle assessment of fast-fashion polyester and cotton T-shirts found that polyester garments generally had higher environmental impacts than cotton garments, particularly in terms of greenhouse gas emissions. The study estimated emissions of 9.62 kg of carbon dioxide equivalent for polyester T-shirts and 6.10 kg for cotton T-shirts under the conditions examined. It also found that extending the lifespan of garments could reduce their carbon emissions by approximately 50%, highlighting the environmental effects of short clothing lifespans.

The extensive use of synthetic fibers creates an additional source of pollution. Fast fashion companies are searching for man-made and synthetic materials such as polyester, cotton, and fiber. During the production, each material requires a significant amount of pesticides, fungicides, and chemicals that release harmful acidic gasses into the environment. Additionally during the manufacturing process, the textile industry uses more than 15,000 different chemicals while spinning, weaving, dyeing, and completing the clothes. Synthetic garments release microplastic fibres during their production, wearing, washing, and disposal. According to the IUCN, these microplastics account for 35% of the microplastics present in the ocean. These chemicals have been linked to causing a variety of health complications amongst consumers such as cancer.

The European Environment Agency estimates that between 200,000 and 500,000 tonnes of microplastics from textiles enter the global marine environment each year. Fast-fashion garments are associated with particularly high releases because synthetic fabrics tend to shed more fibres during their first washes, while these garments are generally used for shorter periods and often wear out quickly. This is especially evident with increased consumption, currently 400% more than it two decades ago. While a majority of Gen Z participants in the ThredUP report wanting to shop more sustainably, 72% shopped in this market throughout 2022.

A 2024 literature review examining fast fashion consumption identified limited consumer knowledge about sustainability and insufficient information about clothing supply chains as factors that may influence how consumers dispose of their clothing. The review also highlights how limited supply-chain transparency makes it difficult to access the fashion industry's environmental impact.

However, specific fast fashion brands, such as Shein, argue that their business reduces the effect of clothing waste. Their brand focuses on current trends, highlighting items that customers are inclined to buy. By sticking to the desired, they end up with less excess items unsold. Therefore, their clothing waste is minimal compared to other stores. This extends as customers rewear their Shein items multiple times, and when time to discard their clothes, the data demonstrates consumers typically gift their old pieces.

Researchers have argued that reducing these environmental impacts requires lower production volumes, more sustainable practices throughout the supply chain and longer garment lifespans. Reuse, improved textile collection and recycling can reduce waste, although these measures do not entirely prevent the release of microplastics from synthetic clothing.

== Legal and regulatory issues ==
Many fast fashion brands have faced legal and regulatory issues related to exploitation of labour including low wages, poor working conditions and the use of sweatshops. In response, many brands audit supplier factories to ensure that working conditions comply with local laws.

Many fast fashion brands have also faced legal and regulatory issues because they produce clothing using non-biodegradable petroleum-based synthetic fibers and microplastics as well as hazardous chemicals including PFAS, endocrine disruptors, and carcinogens. They have been accused of greenwashing by hiding or misrepresenting their true impact on carbon emissions and plastic pollution. Shein was fined €1million in Italy for misleading environmental claims about its products. In response, some brands, such as H&M, have banned the use of PFAS, purchased carbon offsets and credits and promoted textile recycling.

Fast fashion brands have been sued for copying designs that may violate intellectual property laws. In many lawsuits, brands have been accused of copying designs, sometimes creating exact replicas, of major brands such as Ralph Lauren Corporation. Shein has faced numerous lawsuits alleging intellectual property infringement, including the unauthorized copying of designs. Most such copyright lawsuits are settled confidentially. From 2019 to 2024, Shein paid $1.4 million to independent artists in settlements.

=== Legal restrictions ===
In June 2026, the French government enacted landmark legislation intended to regulate ultra-fast fashion retailers, which produce clothing at an "exceptionally" high volume with little incentive for repairability in comparison to a garment's cost. It places a levy on each article of clothing which must be paid to the producer responsibility organization Refashion (which will begin at €0.25–€12.00 per-article, and increase annually over the next four years to €2–€20 by 2030), and makes the products ineligible for tax credits on donating unsold goods. The law also requires that ultra-fast fashion retailers place public interest messages on all sale listings regarding the environmental and social impacts of fast fashion, including its production and shipment, and encouraging consumers to explore sustainable options. Beginning 1 January 2027, the law will also ban all advertising of ultra-fast fashion, including influencer marketing.

French trade minister Serge Papin stated that the law is intended primarily to target retailers such as AliExpress, Shein, and Temu. China's Ministry of Commerce demanded that the law be pulled, arguing that it was a discriminatory trade restriction, and warning that it will "take necessary measures to safeguard the legitimate rights and interests of Chinese enterprises." French officials stated that they were willing to speak with China about the law and encouraged going through the World Trade Organisation, stating that "our Parliament is sovereign and has had its say. It has passed this law and we will fully respect its decision. This kind of threat, this challenge to a state's sovereign position, is coercion, economic retaliation. But for now, it remains a threat." The bill had also faced criticism from French lawmakers, including EELV MP Charles Fournier, for being "watered-down" through the legislative process to not target French and European companies such as H&M, Kiabi, and Zara.

In September 2026, the Green Party-led city council of Bristol, England passed a bylaw banning advertising for "high-carbon" products on city-controlled advertising spaces (such as billboards on bus stops), with the city notably classifying ultra-fast fashion as being covered by the law.

== Worker realities ==
The quick production of these clothes relies on cheap manufacturing. This typically takes place in low wage countries with harsh working standards. The workers receive wages that are not up to a living standard despite their long hours, often over 16 hours a day.

Around three quarters of the workers in this industry are women from the age range of 18 to 35. Several reports, as cited on the Earth Day Organization, found this majority often faces gender discrimination and abuse. Indonesian women in particular have documented exploitation, as young girls have been threatened their jobs if sexual favors and bribes are not completed to their managers.

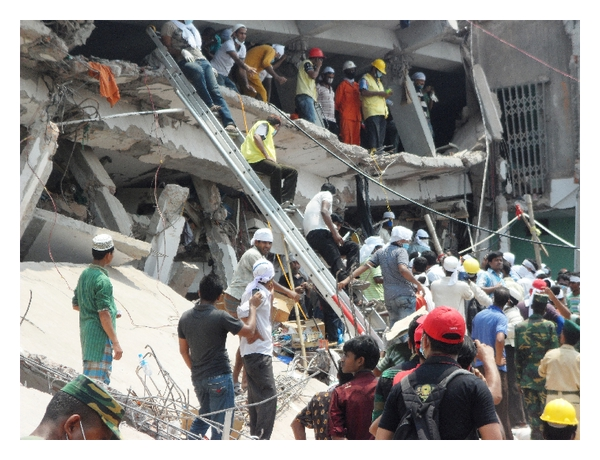
Rana Plaza post collapse in 2013.

In 2013, Bangladesh was one of the top countries for clothing exports. Rana Plaza, an eight story building in Bangladesh, was used for fast fashion manufacturing. On April 23, 2013, the structure was evacuated due to the discovery of building cracks which compromised safety. However, over 3,600 employees were forced to return to the Plaza the next day. When the power went out, the building shook and collapsed, killing more than 1,000 workers of all ages and leaving over 2,500 wounded. For many of the injured, untrained individuals amputated trapped workers without anesthesia or proper medical equipment.

== See also ==
- Cost per action – Measure of cost of online advertising
- Digital fashion – Visual representation of clothing with digital software
- Environmental impact of fashion
- Fast fashion in China
- Slow fashion – Concept in sustainable fashion
- Sweatshop – Workplace that has socially unacceptable working conditions
- The True Cost
- Thrifting – Retail establishment run by a charitable organization to raise money
- Zero-waste fashion – Sustainable clothing design
