= Gajadeera =

Gajadeera is a surname. Notable people with the surname include:

- Chandrasiri Gajadeera (1946–2019), Sri Lankan politician
- Ruwanthi Gajadeera, Sri Lankan textile designer
