= Haul video =

Genre of internet video

A haul video is a video recording posted to the Internet in which a person discusses items that they recently purchased, sometimes going into detail about their experiences during the purchase and the cost of the items they bought. The posting of haul videos (or hauls) was a growing trend between 2008 and 2016. Often the items bought are books, clothing, groceries, household goods, makeup, or jewellery.

== Details ==
The posting of haul videos grew as a trend between 2008 and 2016.

By late 2010, nearly a quarter of a million haul videos had been shared on the website YouTube alone. Certain videos have each received tens of millions of views. Many young adults (mostly women) have displayed their shopping hauls, while including their beauty and design commentary in the narration. The videos are often grouped by store name or by the type of product (cosmetics, accessories, shoes, postage stamps, etc.). Before haul videos became an online trend, millions of people spent time watching other people, in technical product videos unbox their latest new gadgets and technology. The trend of "unboxing videos" had emerged during 2006.

Haul videos have led to celebrity status for some people. Other haul video bloggers have entered sponsorship deals and advertising programs from major brands. The videos are rarely negative about the products being reviewed. This aspect of the genre of haul videos makes sponsorship by brand advertisers particularly appealing. Brands including J.C. Penney contacted haulers as part of their marketing efforts for Back to School 2010.

Haul videos also convinced three San Francisco Bay Area area natives to launch HaulBlog–a parody site that creates fake haul videos which poke fun at the phenomenon. The site is also home to the original monthly web series "The Haul Monitor" a humorous commentary show that features haul videos from around the community.

== Fashion media ==
Sarah Sykes and John Zimmerman of Carnegie Mellon University, HCII and School of Design wrote an article "Making Sense of Haul Videos: Self-created Celebrities Fill a Fashion Media Gap". They discuss their analysis and research project examining what makes video bloggers so popular on YouTube, as well as how it affects fashion media through the production of haul videos.

== Federal Trade Commission ==
The United States Federal Trade Commission recently enacted laws to regulate many types of online publishers and content creators. The posted information includes blogging and podcasting in text, images, audio, and video. While any publishers (including the haul-video creators) are allowed to accept free merchandise and advertising, the gifts or payments must be fully (and clearly) disclosed to reveal being paid by a brand name, as a sponsor, to review a product.

The Canadian Radio-television and Telecommunications Commission is also closely monitoring such Internet activities.

== See also ==
- Conspicuous consumption
- Outfit of the day
- Social media in the fashion industry
- Unboxing
