= Edikted =

Israeli fast fashion retail company

Edikted LLC
- Type: Private
- Industry: Retail
- Founded: 2020; 6 years ago
- Founder: Dedy Shwartzenberg, Zvika Alon
- Headquarters: Los Angeles, California, U.S.
- Number of locations: 11 (2025)
- Key people: Dedy Shwartzberg (CEO)
- Products: Apparel, accessories
- Website: edikted.com

Edikted LLC (pronounced "addicted") is an Israeli fast fashion retail company based in the United States. Originally founded in 2020 as an online store, the company has gained significant popularity among Generation Z women.

== Development ==
Edikted was founded online in 2020, by entrepreneurs Dedy Shwartzenberg and Zvika Alon. Shwartzenberg had previously worked with Israeli fashion company Adika. Its first brick-and-mortar store opened in 2023 in New York.

== Marketing ==
Edikted has been noted for its widespread advertising and marketing on social media platform TikTok. The company saw a rise in popularity from users posting with "#edikted". The hashtag had 183.6 million views on TikTok as of 2022, and Edikted's TikTok account has 820,000 followers as of 2025.

Edikted also holds mobile "pop-up" events that tour across colleges and universities in the United States.

== Stores ==
Edikted currently operates 11 brick-and-mortar stores in the United States:

- 518 Broadway, (SoHo, New York, New York)
- The Grove at Farmers Market (Los Angeles, California)
- Mall of America (Bloomington, Minnesota)
- King of Prussia Mall (King of Prussia, Pennsylvania)
- The Galleria (Houston, Texas)
- Town Center at Boca Raton (Boca Raton, Florida)
- Roosevelt Field (Uniondale, New York)
- Tysons Corner Center (Tysons, Virginia)
- Fashion Valley (San Diego, California)
- Americana at Brand (Glendale, California)
- Irvine Spectrum Center (Irvine, California)
- Garden State Plaza (Paramus, New Jersey)
