= Social media use in the fashion industry =

Use of social media platforms by fashion designers and consumers

Social media in the fashion industry refers to the use of social media platforms by fashion designers and users to promote and participate in trends. Over the past several decades, the development of social media has increased along with its usage by consumers. The COVID-19 pandemic was a sharp turn of reliance on the virtual sphere for the industry and consumers alike. Social media has created new channels of advertising for fashion houses to reach their target markets. Since its surge in 2009, luxury fashion brands have used social media to build interactions between the brand and its customers to increase awareness and engagement. The emergence of influencers on social media has created a new way of advertising and maintaining customer relationships in the fashion industry. Numerous social media platforms are used to promote fashion trends, with Instagram and TikTok being the most popular among Generation Y and Z. The overall impact of social media in the fashion industry included the creation of online communities, direct communication between industry leaders and consumers, and criticized ideals that are promoted by the industry through social media.

== Background ==
In 2003, at the beginning of social media development, MySpace was founded as a “social networking service.” It allowed people to create a profile, connect with other people, and post videos, pictures, and songs. As MySpace grew in popularity, it attracted interest from companies wishing to promote their brands on the social platform. MySpace is most well known for exposing musicians and artists who made it big in the industry, and companies wanted to capitalize on their popularity by making brand deals. One of MySpace's deals was with Chevrolet, putting on a ‘secret show’. They had a ‘secret’ list of 10 top artists on MySpace, and many artists posted about the show on their accounts. Another brand deal was with Gucci promoting their “Gucci Synch Watch”, which was very successful as Gucci tapped into the youthful audience on MySpace and advertised a sleek, simple, trendy unisex watch.

In 2005, YouTube was released and remains one of the most popular social media platforms today. YouTube allows users to upload videos and is free to anyone with access to the internet. It grew in popularity offering a range of videos: vlogs, cooking, health and diet videos, step-by-step tutorials, tutoring help, and more. Much like MySpace, users create accounts and can build a following, often referring to themselves as ‘YouTubers.’ When YouTube grew in popularity, it piqued the interest of brands wanting to partner with YouTube and individual YouTubers. Some brand deals were made by having ads at the beginning of each video, and the YouTuber would make a profit from each view they receive. Some deals are made by individual YouTubers thanking the brand in videos and promoting the brand's products. More recently, YouTube has delved into fashion. While there were always YouTube channels for Vogue and other fashion companies, popular YouTubers have been invited to different fashion shows and have filmed experiences there. Brands are able to target individual YouTubers based on their followers and the target audiences.

In 2010, Instagram was launched, which enlarged the scope of fashion advertising. Instagram allows people to post pictures and short videos with the ability to tag different accounts. For brand deals, companies can simply be tagged in a picture instead of creating ads or lines for a user to say. In each picture, users can tag the brands of clothing they were wearing, making it very easy to promote brands. Additionally, Instagram could display ads on users' feed based on other posts the users liked, which used by fashion companies to target their potential customers. Users also use Instagram to promote fashion when they get invited to fashion events. For example, they can take a picture at the event and post it to their Instagram and put their location at the venue and tag the company.

During the beginning of the COVID-19 pandemic, companies relied more on social media to keep their public virtually engaged. Fashion companies had virtual fashion shows, creating videos and content about their designs. As social media expands and new platforms come into existence, new ways of advertising are projected to be created.

== Uses ==
=== Advertising ===
Social media is a popular use of advertisement in the fashion industry. Information sharing has expanded due to the growth of social media platforms, which impacts social consumer involvement with fashion brands. Fashion companies use social media platforms to reach customers on emotional levels and stoke engagement with brand images and messages. Researchers in the United Kingdom have demonstrated that engaging with customers with social media messages that express social passion, social tendency, and personal warmth can boost social engagement with fashion brands. In social spheres, fashion is a method for individuals to represent their distinction through clothing. Some people who desire to socially influence others through their fashion and style now have the possibility thanks to social media in the fashion sector. Customers who want to purchase fashion brands frequently follow fashion authorities on social media and heed their recommendations for purchasing fashion products.

=== Influencers ===
Companies leveraged celebrities' fame and social standing to advertise their brands, as Tommy Hilfiger did when incorporating social media into their marketing strategy, making Gigi Hadid, who has 15.5 million Instagram followers as of 2016, a brand ambassador. Though recent developments in social media platforms have led to an increase in the awareness of influencers. Influencer marketing has emerged as a fast expanding marketing strategy in various industries as a result of the unheard-of increase in the number of social media influencers' followers. Recently, influencer marketing has received significant attention in the fashion industry. Research shows that influencer marketing may provide a rate of influence that is 11x times greater than that of other conventional advertising channels. Fashion consumers, specifically those in generations Y and Z, may be more influenced by influencers in the context of the fashion industries as they often view them as friends and personal assistants.

Fashion influencer marketing on social media platforms have led fashion consumption on social sopping services. One of these social fashion services is LTK (LIKEtoKNOW.it before 2021) where everyday consumers can find and purchase clothing worn by social media fashion influencers (also known as SMFIs). Launched in 2014, LTK has gained a massive following on Instagram (over 3 million) and has 1.3 million registered users on their mobile application. Utilizing SMFIs has led to massive sales within the fashion industry, 80% of visitors of Nordstrom's mobile platform are referred by influencers. Social media fashion influencers try new fashion products, adopt fashion trends and have power in what their audience purchases. Social media fashion influencers gain a following though promoting fashion products, and posting about their lavish lifestyles attained through their higher socioeconomic status. The attractive lifestyles of the influencers influence their followers to mimic their luxurious lifestyle and are allowed to consume the same products through social shopping services.

In addition to brands themselves having direct access to social media users, many content creators have great influence over consumers. "Influencers" across all social media platforms have great power when it comes to where people shop and what they purchase. Influencer marketing has become one of the most effective marketing strategies for many fashion brands. These brand deals and creator partnerships are targeted towards Millennial and Gen Z consumers, specifically on Instagram and TikTok, and 74% of consumers have made a purchase simply because an influencer they follow had recommended it.

=== Trends ===
The connection between social media and fashion has become common. Influencer marketing has emerged as a necessity and crucial component of advertising. 85% of American businesses are presently using influencer marketing as part of their marketing plan. Wearing fashion brands is a method to show oneself at social gatherings. Through their clothing, people try to demonstrate how distinct they are. Some people who really desire to socially influence others through their fashion and style now have the possibility thanks to social media in the fashion sector. Customers who want to purchase fashion brands frequently follow fashion authorities on social media and heed their recommendations for purchasing fashion products.

In January 2021, the Italian fashion house Bottega Veneta deleted all its social media accounts "to lean much more on its ambassadors and fans" to spread the company's social content, a trend that did not amplify.

=== Fashion campaigns ===
Fashion companies expanded in social media usage beyond advertisement to create a "conversation" with customers, allowing brands to have the opportunity to connect and develop relationships with customers through fashion campaigns.

Charlotte Russe has a successful social media campaign with a strong following on Twitter, Facebook, and YouTube. Their campaign focused on "user-generated content and social engagement." Charlotte Russe holds a weekly trivia contest on Twitter, which compels consumers to visit their website and ran a 'Be The Next Charlotte Russe Design Star' contest, producing the winning T-shirt design.

Marc by Marc Jacobs used social media for a worldwide model casting to showcase their new line. Marc selected models from Instagram that had the hash-tag #Marc and the campaign had almost 70,000 entries from around the world. The head designer wanted to use Instagram for his casting in order to connect with a younger demographic.

Louis Vuitton used Facebook to broadcast its Spring 2010 ready-to-wear show. The use of advertisements and influencers has helped Louis Vuitton grow between the years of 2010 and 2019. In 2019, Louis Vuitton partnered with YouTuber, Emma Chamberlain for Paris Fashion Week.

In 2012, Topshop partnered with Facebook to achieve the largest online audience of a live-stream London fashion show. Over 200 million people were exposed to images and content from the runway. A direct impact was seen by Topshop as customers were able to immediately purchase the looks from the runway, with the first dress on the catwalk selling out before the end of the show.

== Platforms ==
The emergence of social media platforms in the early 2000s has been utilized by fashion brands to promote their products through the use of company-made and influencer-created messages, and share their name beyond advertising. On social media, brands have created profiles as an interactive identity to communicate with their audience or consumers and some use social media for selling directly to customers. Platforms such as TikTok, Instagram, Facebook and YouTube have allowed fashion brands to engage with consumers, often younger than the traditional target market. Utilizing algorithms and personalized pages for the consumers, brands can track likes, dislikes, and analyze data to reach new consumers.

=== TikTok ===
Luxury brands have turned to TikTok to engage younger audiences. During Milan Fashion Week of February 2020, designer brand, Prada, collaborated with the TikTok influencer, Charli D’Amelio, and the video reached 36.8 million views. Later that year in September, TikTok launched its own fashion month and invited users to join by sharing content under hashtags #TikTokFashionMonth, #GetTheLook, and #Fashion101. New York Fashion Week's hashtags on TikTok were the most watched for the Fall 2020 fashion season, reaching 15.3 million visualizations and engaging 2.9 million users.

In September of 2023, TikTok launched its e-commerce "shop" tab to their app, allowing users to make direct purchases on the app from a large variety of retailers. This new feature, called "TikTok Shop" has been integrated into each users feed, or "For You Page" in which ads for products recommended to a user according to their algorithm are mixed into their feed. Creators on the app will be able to promote TikTok Shop products on their posts and then tag direct links to that products page on TikTok Shop. Additionally, brands selling a variety of items can have pages on the shop that display all of their products.

=== Instagram ===
With the 2010 launch of Instagram, the app since then has gained over millions of followers. Instagram is now considered to be one of the most powerful tools in shaping the way consumers perceive brands. 81% of Instagram users use the platform to research products and services and 50% of users have visited a website to make a purchase after seeing a product or a service.

Instagram has incorporated a “Shop” feature on the app; this feature presents the same design and layout as the content from followers, but when pictures are viewed, a marketplace window opens up as if you were shopping for the item on a website. The Shop feature makes content suggestions based on the users' data such as likes and following. Instagram users can comment on posted items and provide feedback and reviews of the product as well as rate their purchase. The posted items are associated with a brand, and this is linked to the brand's Instagram page. Instagram has added features to profile pages to assist in validation of verified brands, such as adding “Retailer” to the profile, to aid consumers in avoiding scams and faulty purchases.

With over 200 million active users, access to creative content is virtually unlimited. Many fashion-forward Instagram accounts with large followings are able to turn their passions into businesses, generating income using their status within the community.

Models and influencers who use Instagram for representation in fashion had a greater likelihood to walk on fashion runways. There is a direct correlation between user popularity on Instagram and their probability to succeed in the fashion industry.

=== Facebook ===
The introduction of the Facebook Pages allows brands to create a Facebook profile for their brand and promote their name. This allowed for consumers to like, follow, and interact with the company page. The company would then post feed that would be received by consumers in their recent posts. Visual media interactions on social media platforms such as Facebook has been successful with the distribution of fashion media. Interactions can take place between the brand and consumer, through advertisements, sharing behind the scenes content and commenting on profiles. Consumers can comment on brand's posts, post pictures in the product, click links, like, and share the page with their own network. Fashion brands utilize Facebook to further connect with their consumers and provide more incentives to shop through special deals in addition to creating brand trust through giving insight on Facebook posts.

=== Pinterest ===
Pinterest is a “visual discovery engine”. The social media component comes from users posting pins and creating pin-boards that other users can save and share. A class of second year fashion students at an American university have incorporated Pinterest into their course curriculum. The motive of utilizing social media in fashion was to open a dialogue of conversation between the designer and the consumer to directly access their wants and needs through the consumer's Pin-Board. Using the platform of social media also allowed students to reach a broader audience of customers and their needs.

=== YouTube ===
More recently, fashion brands have expanded because of YouTubers. YouTubers would receive PR packages and advertise the brand in their videos, and the millions of people watching would see these advertisements and be more inclined to look on these brands' websites and order them. Some YouTubers would be invited to fashion shows, or events from big brands and vlog their experience and upload it to YouTube.

=== Depop ===
In addition to fashion trends and advertisements being spread on social media, there are other ways that social media and fashion correlate. For example, there are social media platforms dedicated to buying and selling clothes, such as Depop. Depop is an online thrift store where users can post pictures of their clothing as advertisements to sell to other users. This site is one of the fastest growing e-commerce platforms with over 7 million active buyers. Depop acts more like social media than other resale apps because users are able to view sellers profile pages that display all of their items, with the ability to leave "likes" on posts.

== Impact on customers ==
=== Online communities ===
Social media platforms such as Facebook fan pages enable customers to communicate with each other and build online communities relating to common fashion interests. Customers rely on the opinions of other customers in online communities to make purchase decisions. 82% of U.S. adults have read online reviews before making first time purchasing decisions.

=== Benefits ===
Customers benefit from the fashion industry's use of social media, as it provides a way to easily communicate with companies and other customers and view product lines. Customers also view fashion companies’ social media pages as a form of entertainment, and some use them for building their own social media presence as content creators and fashion influencers.

=== Harms ===
The fashion industry's use of social media has been criticized for promoting unhealthy body image among young women. Social media exposes customers to images of idealized body standards, which leads to mental health concerns such as depression and social appearance anxiety. Instagram has been criticized for promoting users to “share only the best moments”, which pressures users to “look perfect” and thus created harmful effects such as eating disorders and depression among teenagers.

In response to the body image concerns, some brands have made efforts to promote body positivity through social media and marketing campaigns. The brand, Aerie, launched Aerie Real in 2014 to showcase diverse body sizes and stopped airbrushing models in their campaigns.

== Other Impacts ==
=== Fast Fashion ===
Fast fashion is a model of clothing production that focuses on quickly creating inexpensive, trend-driven pieces to keep up with constantly changing styles. The relationship between fashion and social media significantly accelerates this industry by increasing both the speed and volume of consumption. Platforms like TikTok allow trends to spread almost instantly by reaching widespread audiences and causing shifts in consumer demand. These platforms enable brands to design, produce, market, and sell clothing at an unprecedented pace, allowing companies like Shein to quickly respond to viral trends and continuously release new products.

=== Consumerism ===
In addition to fueling the fast fashion industry, fashion in social media also leads to an abundance of consumerism. Many social media platforms use "targeted advertising" in which users' personal data is tracked so that the product advertisements on their feed is personalized based on their likes and follows. Additionally, fear of missing out (FOMO) is another strategy used by fashion companies to incentives their audiences to buy their products. Social media constantly exposes users to trending styles and influencers, creating anxiety about missing out on what’s “in.” These two drivers of overconsumption lead to impulse purchases where consumers buy things that are unnecessary and beyond their essential needs just to keep up with trends.

== See also ==
- Digital fashion
- Outfit of the day
- Fashion influencers
- Online advertising
- Impact of the COVID-19 pandemic on the fashion industry
- Social media
- Social media marketing
