= Tribute Brand =

Fashion company

Tribute Brand is a fashion company founded in April 2020. It is considered the world’s first direct-to-consumer digital fashion brand. Digital clothing by Tribute Brand can be virtually fitted onto consumers' photos, worn in augmented reality and virtual spaces.

== History ==
Tribute Brand was co-founded by Gala Marija Vrbanić, Filip Vajda, Marina Jukić, and Igor Lipovac in April 2020 in Zagreb, Croatia.

The brand’s approach is attributed to the need for more inclusivity in the fashion industry as well as the necessity to reduce fashion’s waste problem. Digital fashion produces no material waste and fits any gender, sex and size. The inspiration for the brand comes from The Sims, Grand Theft Auto, and other video games where you can dress up video game characters.

In 2022 Tribute Brand participated in Decentraland’s Metaverse Fashion Week.

In 2022 Tribute Brand raised a $4.5 million seed round led by Collab+Currency, with Alice Lloyd George, Lattice Capital, RED DAO, and Flamingo DAO.

In 2022, Tribute Brand was included in the Dazed 100 list.

The same year the brand launched their first physical clothes. Their clothes features NFC tags connected to digital items that can be used in virtual spaces and augmented reality via their mobile app.

In 2023, Tribute Brand’s CEO Gala Marija Vrbanić was included in the Web3 category of the Top 100 Innovators list by Vogue Business, stating Tribute Brand’s aesthetic and processes have influenced others in the Web3 space.

Tribute Brand’s designs were worn by artists such as Charli XCX, Kim Petras, Symone, and fashion editor Nicola Formichetti.

Tribute Brand has created digital fashion designs in collaboration with luxury fashion houses, including Jean Paul Gaultier and Carolina Herrera.

=== Services ===
Tribute Brand creates both physical and virtual products. Examples include digital garments that can be fitted on a photograph, or worn in augmented reality by using their proprietary mobile app; digital avatars that can be used in immersive virtual spaces; physical products equipped with NFC tags connected to digital items and virtual experiences; and 3D models that can be used by creators.
