= Slow fashion =

Concept in sustainable fashion

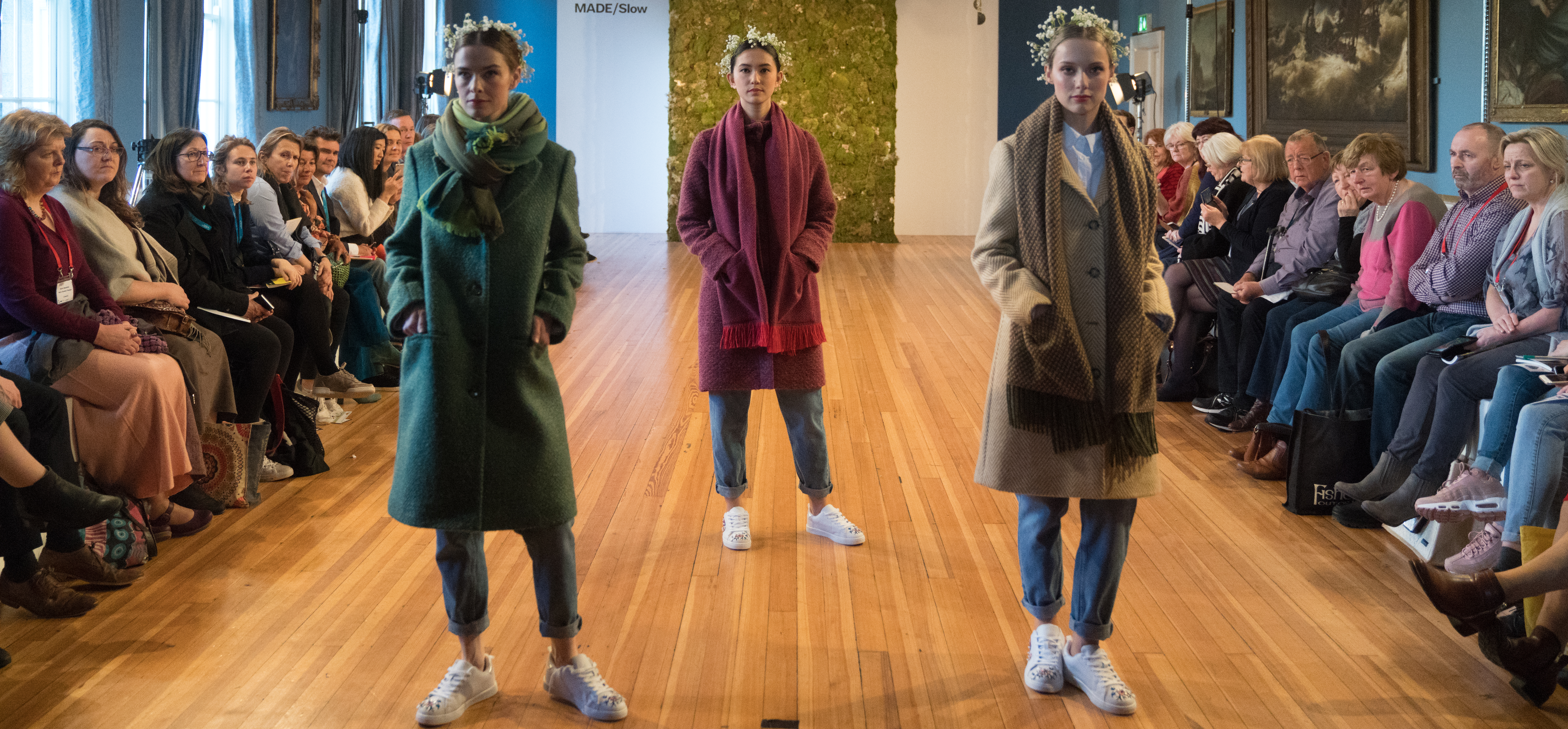
A 2018 slow fashion show in Ireland

Slow fashion is an important concept in the sustainable fashion movement and is contemplated as the opposite of fast fashion. Slow fashion is part of the "slow movement", which advocates for a system of clothing and apparel manufacture that is respectful to people, the environment, and animals. Contrary to fast fashion industrial practices, slow fashion involves local artisans and the use of eco-friendly materials.

The slow fashion or conscious fashion movement has risen in opposition to fast fashion, taking issue with responsibility for pollution (both in the production of clothes and in the decay of synthetic fabrics), poor workmanship, and emphasis on very brief trends over classic style.

In the rise of slow fashion, emphasis has been given to quality clothing that is more enduring.

British Vogue explained that the process of designing and creating clothing in slow fashion involves consciousness of materials, consumer demand, and climate impact.

== Principles ==
Slow fashion is a term used to "identify sustainable fashion solutions, based on the repositioning of strategies of design, production, consumption, use, and reuse, which are emerging alongside the global fashion system, and are posing a potential challenge to it".

As an alternative to fast fashion, its supporters say that it promotes a more ethical and sustainable way of living and consuming. "It encompasses the whole range of 'sustainable,' 'eco,' 'green,' and 'ethical' fashion movement." Slow fashion represents a different business models focusing on ethics, slowing down consumerism, and respecting the environment.

Slow fashion is often defined in opposition to fast fashion. Those who practice slow fashion say that it ensures quality manufacturing and lengthens the life of a garment or material. Slow fashion garments often places emphasis the quality of materials employed and of its production process and that comes at a higher cost to the consumer. Culturally, the movement focuses on encouraging both manufacturers and consumers to decrease production and consumption speed. For example, developing a connection with one's garment is often emphasised by slow fashion: consumers often keep articles of clothing longer than one season if they feel emotionally or culturally connected to them. Another example is the use of recycled materials or upcycling this to reduce the industry's carbon footprint. There are many approaches and business models within the slow fashion movement. Generally, they focus on either extending the life span of a product for a single consumer, giving a single product to multiple consumers, and/or integrating a second life for the product through recycling or upcycling.

Slow fashion is part of a movement which encourages companies to be more transparent about manufacturing processes and their environmental impact. To attract new customers, slow fashion companies emphasize transparency, from manufacturing to retail, with the stated aim of assisting buyers in making more eco-conscious purchasing decisions.

== History ==
Stella McCartney is a luxury designer who focuses on sustainable and ethical practices and has done so since the 1990s.

In 2009, Vogue and The VOU Fashion Magazines traced the history of the context of the Slow Fashion Movement.

In March 1990, the New York Times and Vogue published articles about the environmental trend in the fashion world. In the summer of 1990, British fashion designer Katharine Hamnett, who has been often recognized as one of the first designers to combine environmental activism with fashion, gave a speech about the environmental impacts of fashion at the United Nations. In 1995, Giorgio Armani began to use hemp in his Emporio Armani collection. In 2001, Natalie Chanin launched Project Alabama, a collection of 200 locally produced hand-sewn T-shirts that was well received at New York Fashion Week. The same year, Stella McCartney launched her own line, applying animal-friendly (no leather, no fur) policies.

Many companies have supported movements that advocate a shift away from fast fashion, such as the Fashion Revolution Day and Second Hand September campaigns. Major fast fashion retailers such as Zara and H&M have come forward either to pledge major change in the future or launch a clothing line dedicated to sustainable clothing.

The concept of slow fashion became more well-known after Elizabeth L. Cline published Overdressed: The Shockingly High Cost of Cheap Clothing, which described the pitfalls of fast fashion. The term "slow clothes movement" was coined by Angela Murrills, a fashion writer for Georgia Straight, a Vancouver-based online news magazine, and was adopted on blogs and the internet.

The expression "slow fashion" was also used in an article by Kate Fletcher published in The Ecologist in 2007, where she compared the eco/sustainable/ethical fashion industry to the Slow Food Movement:

The concept of slow fashion borrows heavily from the Slow Food Movement. Founded by Carlo Petrini in Italy in 1986, Slow Food links pleasure and food with awareness and responsibility. It defends biodiversity in our food supply by opposing the standardisation of taste, defends the need for consumer information and protects cultural identities tied to food. It has spawned a wealth of other slow movements. Slow Cities, for example, design with slow values but within the context of a town or city and a commitment to improve its citizens' quality of life.

The Slow Food Movement advocates for the "Good, Clean, Fair" principles: Good quality (flavorsome and healthy food); Clean production (that does not harm the environment); and Fair, accessible prices for consumers (along with fair conditions and pay for producers).

The slow fashion movement has been studied by Fletcher, a researcher, author, consultant, and design activist, and the author of Sustainable Fashion and Textiles. Her writings integrate design, fashion, and textiles as a necessary way to move towards a more sustainable fashion industry.

Based on the three principles of slow design that were created in 2006 in Milan, Hazel Clark, in SLOW + FASHION - an Oxymoron - or a Promise for the Future...? further defined what would become the main principles of slow fashion: taking a local approach; having a transparent production system; and making sustainable, sensorial products.

In 2019, academic Debapratim Purkayastha provided a case study on one active slow fashion company called 7Weaves. The Assam-based social venture deals in sustainably sourced and manufactured Eri silk products by working with both the forest-dependent indigenous people in the region and global slow fashion brands in the West. Eri silk is manufactured without killing silk worms, and 7Weaves uses only natural dyes when coloring the material.

7Weaves' workflow provided a sustainable livelihood to artisans who had traditional knowledge in handloom and sericulture techniques. The company guaranteed work for its artisans at a fixed monthly fee for the whole year and redistributed 50% of its annual profits to other artisans and workers in the supply chain. 7Weaves was also able to preserve the biodiversity of the ecologically fragile Assam valley region. Slow fashion brands from countries including Germany, France, Belgium and Australia source garments and fabrics from 7Weaves, and the company has achieved a prominent place in the slow fashion world.

In the 2020 spring-summer fashion season, high-end designers led the movement of slow fashion by creating pieces that developed from environmentally friendly practices in the industry.

== Marketing ==
Slow fashion has its own marketing strategies, as it targets consumers expecting classic and timeless pieces of clothes. Advertisements commonly emphasize versatility, low maintenance, and high quality.

Marketing strategies often revolve around highlighting conscious consumption, with ads that focus on environmentally and socially sustainable aspects of the clothes. Companies will emphasize that they change their active clothing line infrequently, produce and stock few items, pay great attention to the materials they use, and adhere to a non-exploitative model of production.

Slow fashion is also often associated with the sourcing of vintage and second-hand clothing from thrift shops, to the extent that they offer clothes that were not immediately produced within a just-in-time flow and provide recycled, cheaper clothing options. The authors of the 2024 content analysis examined over 1,000 Instagram posts from two slow fashion organizations in Southeast Asia and found that most of the posts focused on consumer education rather than sales promotion.

Approaches in slow fashion tend to be oriented towards three main types of approaches. The first encompasses extending "single-user lifetimes" of clothing which seeks to keep products in use as long as possible by a single consumer and the second focuses on putting "multiple-user lifetimes and the third focuses on "product reconstruction and recycling".

Business models that fall into the first category would be ones that offer repair services and warranties for their clothes. The second category encompasses business models that offer clothing rental or leasing. Brands that focus on upcycling or re-making existing clothing fall into the third type of approach.

== Production ==
The production process of slow fashion is divided worldwide to maximize efficiency and profit, since it is more time-consuming, local, and quality-oriented. Therefore, the slow fashion market is not always competitive. Several scholars have questioned the longevity of slow fashion in a market-driven society.

In slow fashion, designers are encouraged to use local workforces and resources. Quality is prioritized over quantity. The production chain is intended to be as transparent as possible, to redefine the hierarchy between designers, consumers, and producers. Fast fashion is typically ruled by trends that come and go quickly, encouraging rapid consumption. The end products offered to clients by slow fashion designers are made to last longer, unconnected to a specific trend.

Slow fashion has different production costs and companies cannot produce a high quantity of goods; they are generally unable to compete with the product count of fast fashion companies that use cheaper labor and resources to maximize profits.

By keeping the production in "productive communities", the slow fashion process is more transparent, highlighting less intermediation and a greater cultural and material value to the consumer.

=== Pricing ===
The pricing of slow fashion clothing varies. A second-hand dress from a thrift shop worth five dollars and a designer dress costing 700 dollars can both be considered slow fashion.

The concept of "cost per wear" is an indicator used by slow fashion advocates to assess the true value of a garment by dividing its purchase price by the estimated number of times it will be worn. This reasoning encourages investment in durable pieces whose unit cost per use is often lower than that of inexpensive garments that wear out quickly.

The mainstream Capitalist economic system focuses on economic growth and quantity of goods sold to measure success. However, research has shown that more parameters should be included in considering what makes a company successful due to perception and social conscience among consumers. People have expressed willingness to pay more for clothes when they know that their purchases have been produced with "sweat-free" manufacturing.

== Impact ==
The slow fashion movement is one component of the larger sustainable fashion culture. In 2018, a third of fashion consumers bought clothing once a month, a decrease from 37% in 2016, whereas those buying clothes every two or three months (or less) rose from 64% to 67%, according to the market research firm Mintel. While the slow fashion movement in and of itself cannot be definitively proven as the cause of those findings, consumers are overall buying fewer clothing items and falling off of the fast fashion trend cycle for reasons of their own.

After the release of the documentaries The True Cost and RiverBlue, companies that utilize fast fashion strategies found themselves accruing negative press. In the fiscal year of 2016, H&M had a total revenue around $25 billion. In 2018, however, H&M's stock and brand image has declined as consumer awareness of their environmentally unethical practices led to a drop in sales.

Zara and H&M have attempted to appeal to the public in statements where they praise ethical fashions. By launching collections aimed at sustainable fashions, the two companies have shifted their optics towards ethical practices. Professional and regulatory organizations, such as the United States Fashion Industry Association, have devoted attention to increasing "social compliance and sustainability" in their production standards.

== Reactions ==
In her 2016 article titled "Doing Good and Looking Good: Women in 'Fast Fashion' Activism", Rimi Khan criticized the slow fashion movement, particularly the work of high-profile designers and slow fashion advocates McCartney and Vivienne Westwood, as well as other well known industry professionals such as Livia Firth, for creating fashion products which cater to a mostly western, wealthy, and female demographic. Khan also pointed out that because most slow fashion products are significantly more expensive than fast fashion items, consumers are required to have a certain amount of disposable income in order to participate in the movement. Khan argues that by proposing a solution to fast-fashion that is largely inaccessible to many consumers, they are positioning wealthier women as "agents of change" in the movement against fast fashion, whereas the shopping habits of lower income women are often considered "problematic".

Andrea Chang provided a similar critique of the slow fashion movement in her article "The Impact of Fast Fashion on Women". She wrote that the slow and ethical fashion movements place too much responsibility on the consumers of fast fashion clothing, most of whom are women, to influence the industry through their consumption. Chang suggests that because most consumers are limited in their ability to choose where and how they purchase clothing, largely due to financial factors, anti-fast fashion activists should target lawmakers, manufacturers, and investors with a stake in the fast fashion industry rather than create an alternative industry that is only accessible to some.

Critics have called out certain brands who have claimed to respect slow fashion principles. Swedish brand H&M was accused of not being sustainable after reports that company policy dictates that unsold clothes be incinerated and destroyed. While H&M claims that they are striving to create sustainability to the best of their abilities, branding some items with green "Conscious" tags to signal that they contain "more sustainable materials," it is largely known that the company has not curbed the mass production of other garments. When a company purports that it values sustainability while operating in a way that does not align with that philosophy, this is called greenwashing.

== See also ==
- Ecodesign
- Empathic design
- Sustainable clothing
- Trashion
- Product tracing systems: allow to see source factory of a product
- Zero-waste fashion
