= Zero-waste fashion =

Sustainable clothing design

Zero-waste fashion refers to a fashion design strategy, that generates little or no textile waste during the production process, particularly focusing on the pattern making and cutting stages. It is a reaction to the high amount of discarded clothing items going into landfills around the world.

Zero-waste fashion strategies can be categorized under two general approaches: pre-consumer zero-waste fashion, which eliminates waste during manufacture, and post-consumer zero-waste fashion, which generates clothing from existing materials such as second-hand clothing and elements or textiles made from other discarded consumer products. Historically, zero-waste designs have been utilised in folk clothing, including the kimono, sari, and chiton, among others.

== Pre-consumer zero-waste fashion ==
Pre-consumer waste is created primarily by the fashion industry during the fibre, yarn, fabric, and garment manufacturing processes and includes unsuitable fibres, remnants, trimmings, cutoffs, and scraps of unsuitable quality. This waste consists of fibres, chemicals, dyes, and finishes that are ideal for recycling. Secondary pre-consumer waste consists of unsold finished stock of garments and other fabric items like curtains and bedding.

=== Zero-waste pattern design ===
In zero-waste pattern design, the designer creates a garment through the pattern-cutting process, working only within the space allotted by the fabric width. This approach directly influences the design of the final garment, as the pattern-cutting process is a primary design step. Alternatively, zero-waste manufacturing is an approach that aims to eliminate textile waste without modifying garment patterns. This approach allows garments and fabric to be fully used with no fabric wasted.

=== Gradable zero-waste apparel design ===
The Carrico Zero-waste Banded Grading technique is one proposed solution that utilises bands to cut patterns without wasting textiles. In this technique, carefully planned seam placements grow or shrink, allowing sizing of the clothing item up or down to create three different sizes of a garment. After conducting the study, they found that the technique was successful at creating one-piece or two-piece items. Some issues with this practice include the proportion of the differently sized garments and inconsistencies in seam allowances.

=== Differences from standard fashion production ===
A standard garment production process may begin with a drawing of the desired garment. A pattern is then generated to achieve this design, a marker is made to most efficiently use the fabric, and the pattern pieces are then cut from the cloth, sewn, packed, and distributed to retailers. Standard garment production generates an average of 15% textile waste.

=== Slow Fashion ===
Fast fashion is a system of seasons and microseasons, created by and at the retail stage, where certain clothes, designs and materials are advertised as being desirable for a short amount of time, at the end of which consumers are encouraged to abandon these and move on to buy other, more suitable clothes.

Slow fashion is seen as an antidote to fast fashion, and part of the larger slow movement culture, advocating for thoughtful manufacturing which is respectful of people, animals and the environment. Slow fashion encourages consumers to look at purchasing timeless garments and styles, believing that such items can last for years, rather than weeks, as well as only buying items which are needed. This reduction in demand can also lead to a reduction in transport costs, both financial and environmental.

== Post-consumer zero-waste fashion ==
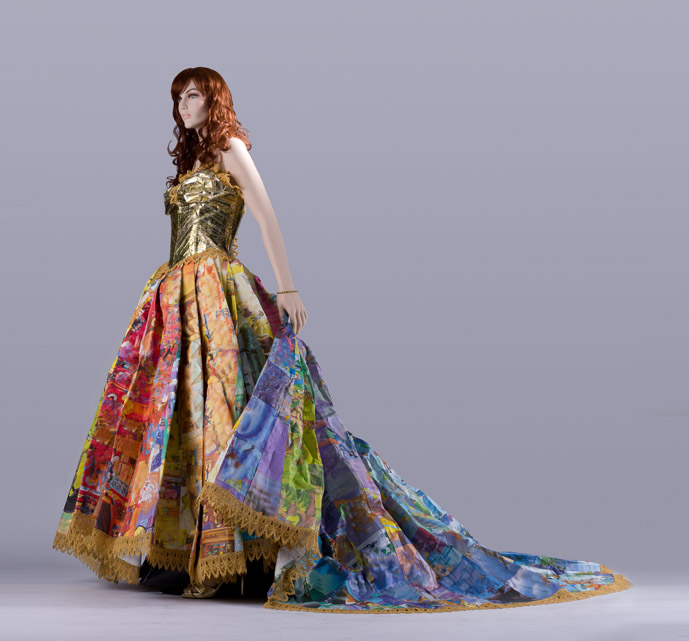
An example of post-consumer zero-waste fashion, this 'Storybook gown' is constructed of recycled and discarded children's books.

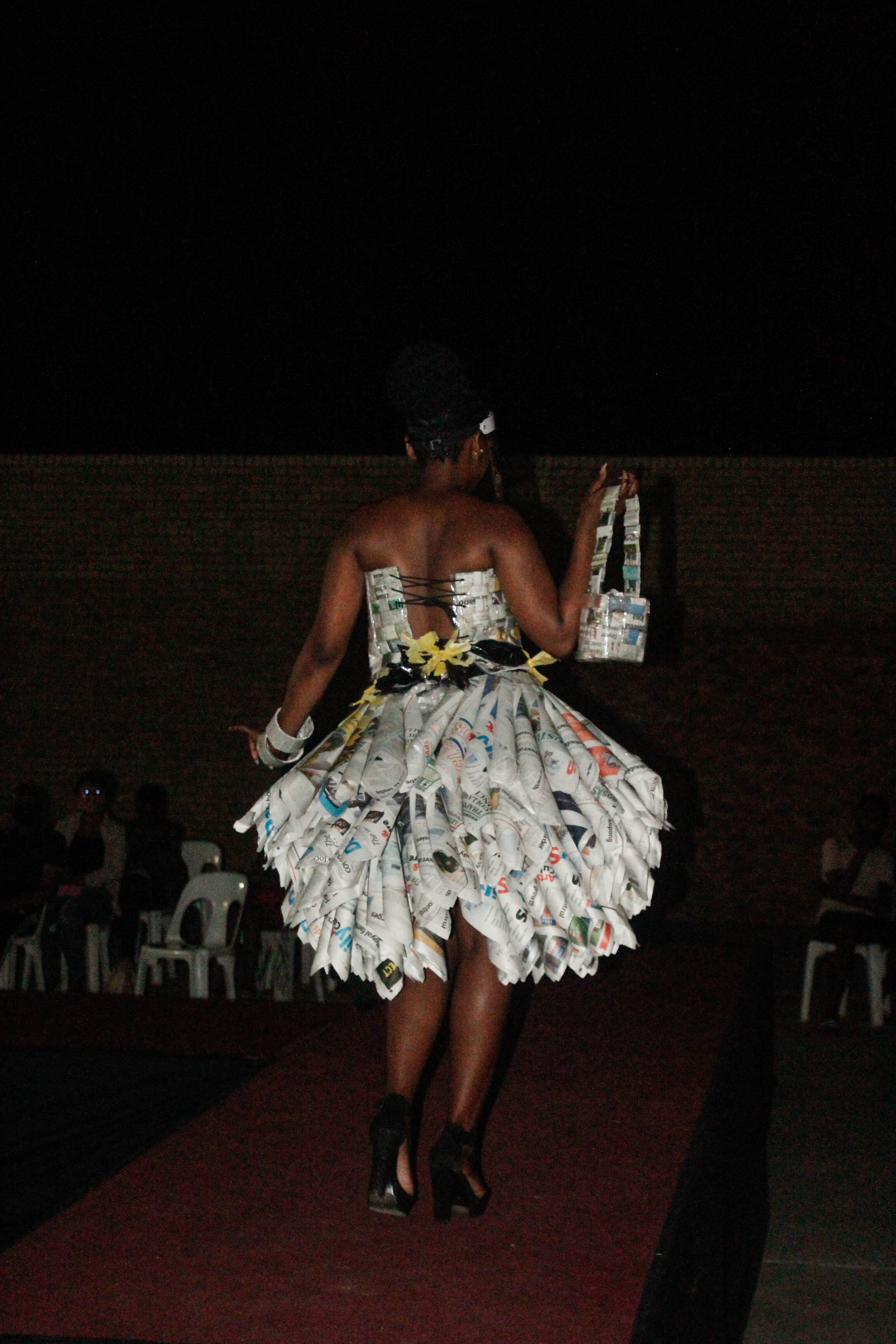
Fashion and Wellness shows a "Model showcasing a dress made out bulletin newspapers, this is an attempt towards clearing the environment and keeping it clean". This is from the theme "Health and wellness in Africa."

Post-consumer zero-waste fashion can also include used and discarded garments. Unwanted clothing can be sold on through donations to charity shops or through online sales.

However, less than one-third of discarded garments are resold as post-consumer recycled (PCR) clothing. In 2018 1.5 million tons of discarded clothing was sold by the EU to Asian and African countries, competing with local garment producers in those countries. Over two-thirds of discarded garments that are not incinerated are either torn and used as wiping rags or stripped down to extract yarn or fibres. The fibres, post-consumer recycled (PCR) textiles, remain in a closed loop where the recycling results in the manufacture of the same type of product: garments.

In an open loop, other types of discarded consumer goods are recycled to create zero-waste fashion. One example is rPET bottles, which are processed to extract polyester fibre used in the production of garments. Other examples of recycled consumer products not related to fashion that are used to create zero-waste fashion are old books, newspapers, plastics, and shopping bags.

== Waste elimination hierarchy ==
The waste hierarchy consists of the three 'R's' - Reduce, Reuse, Recycle - in order of impact. Zero-waste fashion design reduces or even eliminates pre-consumer textile waste. However, it does not necessarily address waste created during the use life and disposal phase of the garment's life cycle.

During textile production, many pollutants are emitted into the environment. The textile and apparel industries are some of the most polluting, and both have a low recycling rate of about 15%. Zero-waste fashion design could significantly reduce gaseous emissions during the production process and help to reuse material waste.

== Impact ==
Zero-waste fashion significantly impacts the industry by promoting sustainable practices, reducing environmental damage, and encouraging innovation in design and production. It challenges traditional methods and leads to more eco-friendly, ethical fashion choices.

== Limitations ==
While zero-waste fashion design methods offer sustainability benefits, they also face limitations. Variations in aesthetic appearances between sizes, increased production time, and challenges in documentation are some of the notable concerns. Informing customers about size variations, exploring ways to lower costs, and improving documentation practices can address these limitations. Continued research and innovation are important to overcome these limitations and advance sustainability practices in the fashion industry.

== Notable contributions ==
- Dorothy K. Burnham: Cut My Cote (1973) was a seminal text that summarized decades of Burnham's research into cuts of traditional dress and the influence of weave on costume cut.
- Madeleine Vionnet's design approach aligns well with zero-waste fashion design; many of her garments had minimal waste.
