= Outfit of the day =

Clothes worn by fashion bloggers

Outfit of the day (commonly abbreviated OOTD) is a phrase used online by users sharing what outfits (or "fits") they wear on a particular day or occasion. The video or post often mentions where each article of clothing, shoes, jewelry, and other accessories is from. OOTD posts are typically found on social media websites, such as Tumblr, Instagram, and Pinterest, and OOTD videos on YouTube and TikTok.

Motives for sharing OOTD content vary, from encouraging viewers to buy a certain product, showing off personal style, or giving outfit inspiration.

== History ==
"Outfit of the Day" videos started as early as 2010 but gained popularity in 2019.

By 2016, the hashtag "OOTD" on Instagram had over 80 million posts.

OOTD videos have become popular with the average internet user, as they express one's fashion sense and style to their followers.

== Use in marketing ==
Brands will use famous influencers to promote their products using the "outfit of the day" tactic in hopes that users will buy the product to emulate the influencer. This tactic has increased sales for many brands. Creators of OOTD content can also profit, often through brand deals or affiliate links.

Vogue has a recurring segment on YouTube that shows "Every outfit (fill in celebrity name here) wears in a week."

== Variants ==
A variant is "outfit(s) of the week" (OOTW), where a user will share multiple outfits to be worn over the course of several days or a week.

OOTDs are often seen in "Get ready with me" (GRWM) videos, where a user films their morning routine. In these videos, the filmers talk about their plans for the day, what makeup products they are using to get ready, and the "Outfit of the day" they are wearing.

== Criticism ==
Some fashion writers have suggested that the proliferation of OOTD content encourages people to buy new clothing rather than to wear already owned items.

Some stylists have also proposed that OOTD content encourages users to follow trends rather than explore and find their own style.

== See also ==
- Social media in the fashion industry
