= Environmental impact of fashion =

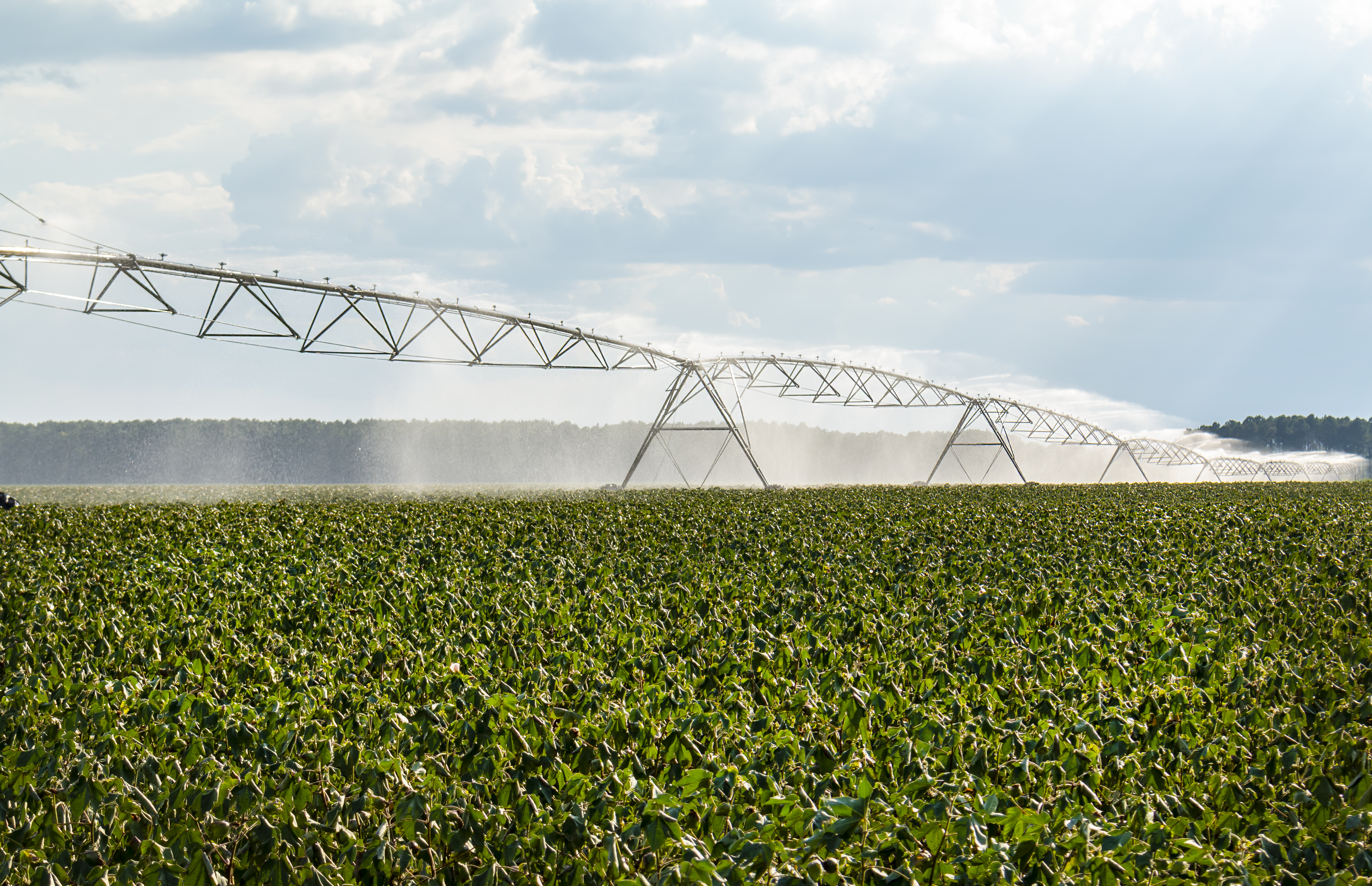
Production of cotton requires a large amount of water, and also produces wastewater.

The fashion industry, particularly the manufacturing and use of apparel and footwear, is a significant driver of greenhouse gas emissions, pollution, water use, and textile waste. During the 19th century, industrialization meant a move towards the manufacture of textiles on a large-scale, which only accelerated the environmental degradation.

The rapid growth of the fashion industry has led to around 100 billion items of clothing being consumed annually, a figure that is still increasing owing to the acceleration of fashion cycles and consumer demand for inexpensive yet fashionable garments.

Less than one percent of clothing is recycled to make new clothes. The clothing sector emits about 2% of world total greenhouse gases. The production and distribution of the crops, fibers, and garments used in fashion all contribute to differing forms of environmental pollution, including water, air, and soil degradation. The textile industry is the second greatest polluter of local freshwater in the world, and is culpable for roughly one-fifth of all industrial water pollution. Some of the main factors that contribute to this industrially caused pollution are the vast overproduction of fashion items, carbon emissions from producing some synthetic fibers such as polyester, the agriculture pollution of fashion crops, and the proliferation of microfibers across global water sources.

Efforts have been made by some retailers and consumers to promote sustainable fashion practices, such as reducing waste, improving energy and water efficiency, and using primarily eco-friendly materials. Counter movements, such as slow fashion, have also developed as a response to the growth of the industry. The Apparel Impact Institute’s Energy and Carbon Benchmark can be used.

Fast fashion is defined as "an approach to the design, creation, and marketing of clothing fashions that emphasizes making fashion trends quickly and cheaply available to consumers."

While traditional fashion processes usually take about 6 months to design, manufacture, and market products, fast fashion completes these processes in several weeks, allowing the quickly changing demands of consumers to be met. Fast fashion has been enabled by global supply chains, low-cost manufacturing and just-in-time inventory systems that enable retailers to produce and distribute clothing at a scale never before seen. Globalization encouraged the rapid growth of the fast fashion industry.

== Impact on waste and overconsumption ==
Elizabeth L. Cline's 2012 book Overdressed: The Shockingly High Cost of Cheap Fashion was one of the first investigations into the human and environmental toll of fashion. The practice has also come under criticism for contributing to poor working conditions in developing countries.

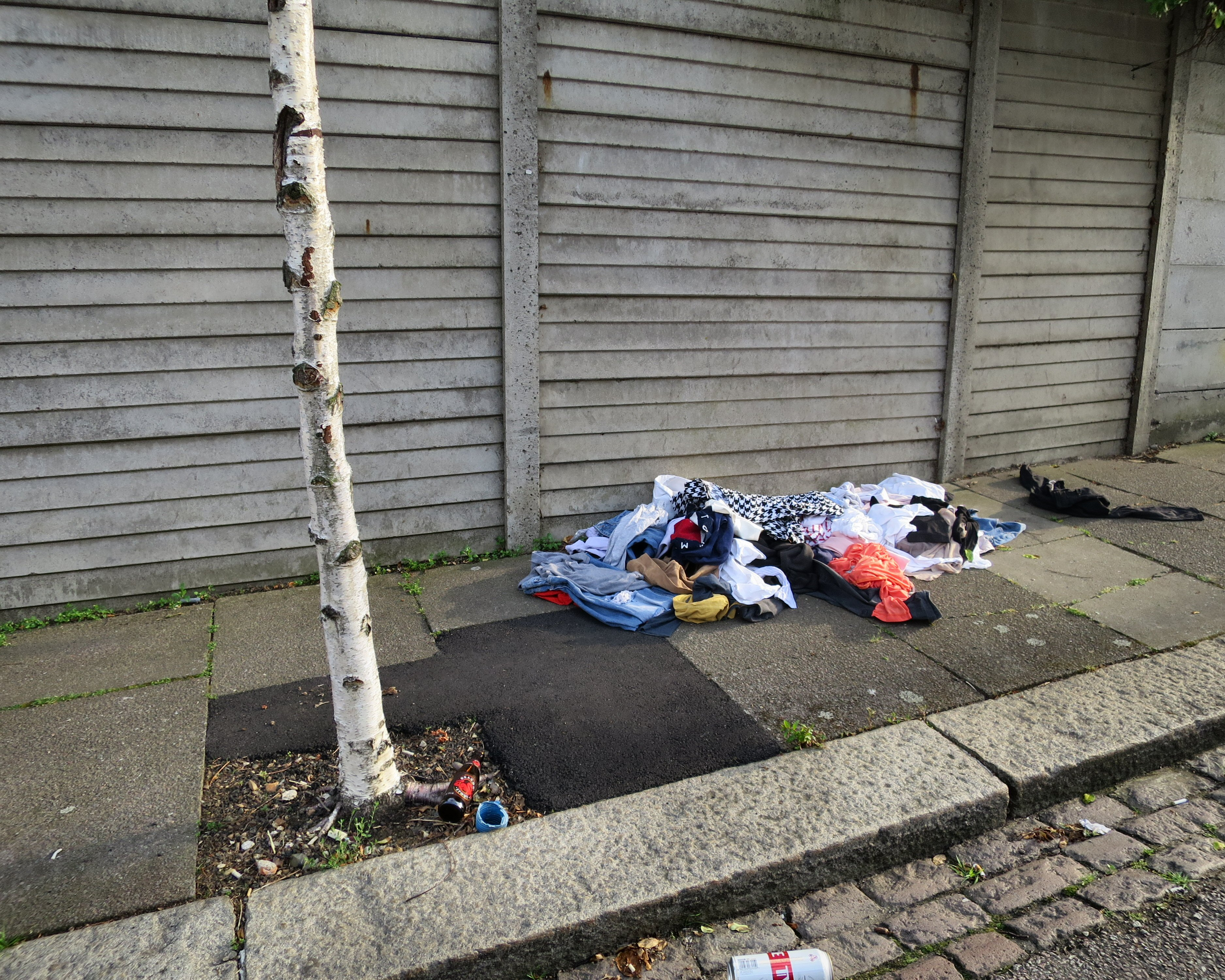
Discarded clothes in London, 2019

The cheaper prices of fast fashion typically lead to impulse purchases, resulting in a higher return rate; many of such returns are then discarded by the companies.

In 2022, fast fashion packaging was accountable for 40% of plastic waste. A recent survey found that nearly 10% of the microplastics found in the ocean occur from textile waste and discarded fashion clothing which may raise concerns going forward.

Fast fashion has led to increased dumping in Ghana, where about 40% of the second hand clothing delivered there from other countries cannot be sold or reused, and is collected by waste management services, burned or dumped in landfill.

In 2018, H&M's design team began implementing 3D design, 3D sampling and digital prototyping to help cut waste. Artificial intelligence can be used to produce small garment runs for specific stores.

In contrast to modern overconsumption, fast fashion traces its roots to World War II austerity, where high design was merged with utilitarian materials. The business model of fast fashion is based on consumers' desire for new clothing to wear. In order to fulfill consumers' demand, fast fashion brands provide affordable prices and a wide range of clothing that reflects the latest trends. This ends up persuading consumers to buy more items which leads to the issue of overconsumption.

Planned obsolescence, which is dominant in fashion marketing where trends change often, plays a key role in overconsumption. Fast fashion retailers sell clothing that is expected to be disposed of after being worn only a few times. Low-quality goods make overconsumption more severe since those products have a shorter life span and need to be replaced much more often.

== Impact on health ==
The fashion industry incorporates dangerous goods into fabrics, used to preserve and increase the durability of clothes. These include dyes containing heavy metals, lead, phthalates, and per- and poly-fluoroalkyl substances (PFAS), antimicrobial agents that promote bacterial resistance, and synthetic fibers that release microplastics and contain endocrine disruptors, carcinogens, and can cause skin irritation.

== Materials and textiles ==
The majority of fashion's environmental impact comes from its raw materials.

=== Synthetic materials ===
Synthetic materials in clothing require an estimated 342 million barrels of oil per year. Polyester was one of the most popular fibers used in fashion in 2017, found in about 60% of garments in retail stores and equalling about 21.3 million tons of polyester fiber. There was a 157% increase of polyester clothing consumption from 2000 to 2015. Washing polyester clothing leads to shedding of microplastics which enter water systems, including oceans. It is estimated that 35% of all microplastics in the ocean come from laundering synthetic textiles.

=== Cotton ===
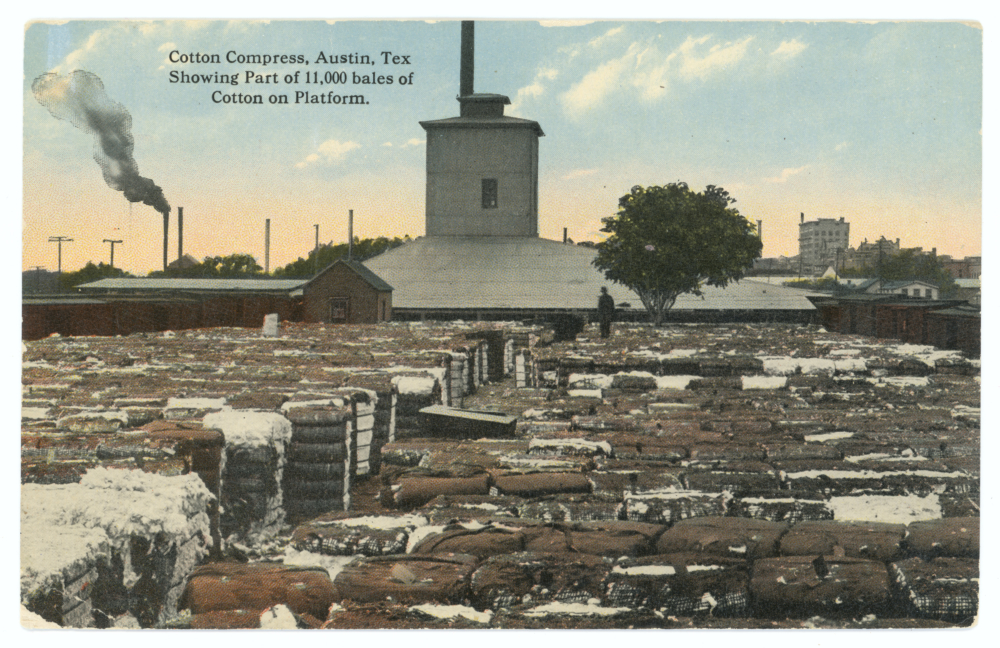
1913 image of cotton production in the United States.

Cotton is the most common non-food crop in the world. Cotton production uses 2.5% of the world's farmland. Half of all textiles produced are made of the fiber. Cotton is a water-intensive crop, requiring 3644 cubic meters of water to grow one ton of fiber, or 437 gallons per pound. Growing cotton requires 25% of insecticides and 10-16% of pesticides of what is used globally every year. Half of the top pesticides used in growing cotton in the US are deemed likely to be carcinogenic by the United States Environmental Protection Agency. Cotton production degrades the quality of the soil, leading to exhausted fields and expansion into new areas. Expansion into new areas leads to the destruction of local habitats and the associated pollution affects biodiversity.

=== Animal fibers and textiles ===
| Fiber | MJ of energy/kg of textile | liters of water/kg of textile |
|---|---|---|
| nylon | 250 | --- |
| acrylic | 175 | --- |
| polyester | 125 | 50,690-71,409 |
| polypropylene | 115 | --- |
| viscose | 100 | 3,000 |
| wool | 63 | 500 |
| cotton | 55 | 10,000-20,000 |

Energy use here is measured in megajoules needed to produce one kilogram of the given textile. Water use here is measured in liters of water needed to produce one kilogram of the given textile.

== Greenhouse gas emissions ==
In 2023 fashion emitted almost 2% of world total greenhouse gases, and it contributes to climate change through energy-intensive production. As of 2026 the United Nations Economic Commission for Europe still has a 2018 press release on their website which says 2% to 8%, despite this being criticised by BBC "More or Less" for being unsourced (they say there was a study which said 8% but it is old). According to the BBC "More or less" investigation in 2022 the best study at that time was the 2021 WRI report which gave 2%. The proportion of textile fibres used in clothing must be a factor in the calculation as some are used in other products, such as filters and seat belts.

Production of polyester emits significant amounts of greenhouse gas, followed by cotton, leather, wool, man-made cellulosic fibres and nylon. Most polyester is made in China: whereas the European Union Emissions Trading System may encourage reducing emissions prices on the Chinese national carbon trading scheme are far lower. It has been suggested that exporters to the EU should decarbonize in case clothing is included in the EU Carbon Border Adjustment Mechanism in future. Several strategies were suggested for manufacturers, including more use of textile based feedstock for polyester production, capturing of carbon dioxide from ethylene production, and a certification for low-carbon polyester. Reducing the share of electricity from coal-fired power stations and coal in process heating in clothes manufacturing countries such as China, India, and Pakistan would also help.

Recent research suggests that despite constituting a small fraction of total apparel volume, methane emissions from animal-based fibres (such as wool and leather) comprise a disproportionately large share of the fashion industry's greenhouse gas footprint. Indeed, one study estimates that, although wool and leather account for just 3–5% of global fashion production, they could be responsible for 70–80% of its methane emissions over 20 years.

== Water use and pollution ==
Improperly disposing of clothing can harm the environment, especially through wastewater. Chemicals from decomposing clothing can leach into the air and into the ground, affecting both groundwater and surface water. Aside from plastic pollution, textiles also contribute significantly to marine pollution. Unlike plastic, textile pollution's impact on marine life occurs in its various supply chain processes. Pollutants like pesticides and clothing manufacturing chemicals cling to particles that accumulate in the water ecosystem and consequently enter into human food chains.

=== Microfiber pollution ===
Plastic and synthetic textile are both created from a chemical structure called polymer. The Merriam-Webster dictionary defines polymer as "a chemical compound or mixture of compounds formed by polymerization and consisting essentially of repeating structural units." For plastic, the common polymer found is PET, polyethylene (PE), or polypropylene (PP), whereas for textile, the polymer found the most abundant in the collection of waste is polyester and nylon textiles.

Plastic Waste Generation by Countries, Regions and Polymer, 2019

Textiles shed microfibers at every stage of their life cycle, from production, to use, to end of life disposal. These fibers end up in the soil, air, lakes, and oceans. Microfiber pollution has existed as long as the textile industry has, but only recently has it come under public scrutiny. The Ocean Wise Conservation Association produced a study discussing the textile waste. For polyester, it stated that on average, humans shed around 20 to 800 mg micro polyester waste for every kg textile washed. A smaller amount for nylon is found; for every kg of fabrics washed, around 11 to 63 mg of nylon microfiber waste are shed into bodies of water. Washing synthetic textiles releases microplastics and microfibers into the oceans. This type of waste is most commonly found from washing machine cycles, where fibers of clothes fall loose during the tumbling process. An individual domestic load of laundry can shed up to 700,000 microfibers.

The Association also released a study stating that on average, households in the United States and Canada produce around 135 grams of microfibers, which is equivalent to 22 kilotons of microfibers released to the wastewater annually. This wastewater will go through various waste water treatment plants, however, around 878 tons of those 22 kilotons were left untreated and hence, thrown into the ocean.

Textiles are the main source of microfibers in the environment. Thirty five percent of the microplastics that are found in marine ecosystems, such as shorelines, are from synthetic microfibers and nanofibers. Such microfibers affect marine life in that fish or other species in the marine ecosystems consume them, which end up in the intestine and harm the animals. Microfibers have been found in the digestive tracts of widely consumed fish and shellfish. These fish are then consumed by humans, which leads to the absorption of micro pollutants in the fish in a process called biomagnification. Predators of the affected marine species are also harmed, as they ingest the microfibers previously ingested by their prey. The yearly shellfish consumption of microplastics was found to be 11,000 pieces, and microfibers were found in eighty three percent of fish caught in one lake in Brazil. In one study, the food consumption rates decreased in crabs who were eating food with plastic microfibers, which further lead to the available energy for growth to also decrease.

Techniques to address the environmental impacts of the fashion industry include a marine algal bioabsorbent, which could be used for dye removal through rich algal surface chemistry through heteroatom containing functional groups.

=== Water use ===
The fashion industry consumes a large amount of water to produce fabrics and manufacture garments every year. The global fashion industry uses 93 billion cubic meters of water per year, or 20 trillion gallons. This is four percent of all freshwater withdrawal globally. This amount is set to double by 2030 if it follows the current trend. According to the United Nations Environment Programme, the fashion industry is responsible for 20 percent of global wastewater. Manufacturing a single pair of Levi jeans, will on average, consume about 3,781 liters of water. On average, producing one kilogram of textiles requires 200 liters of water.

=== Water consumption ===
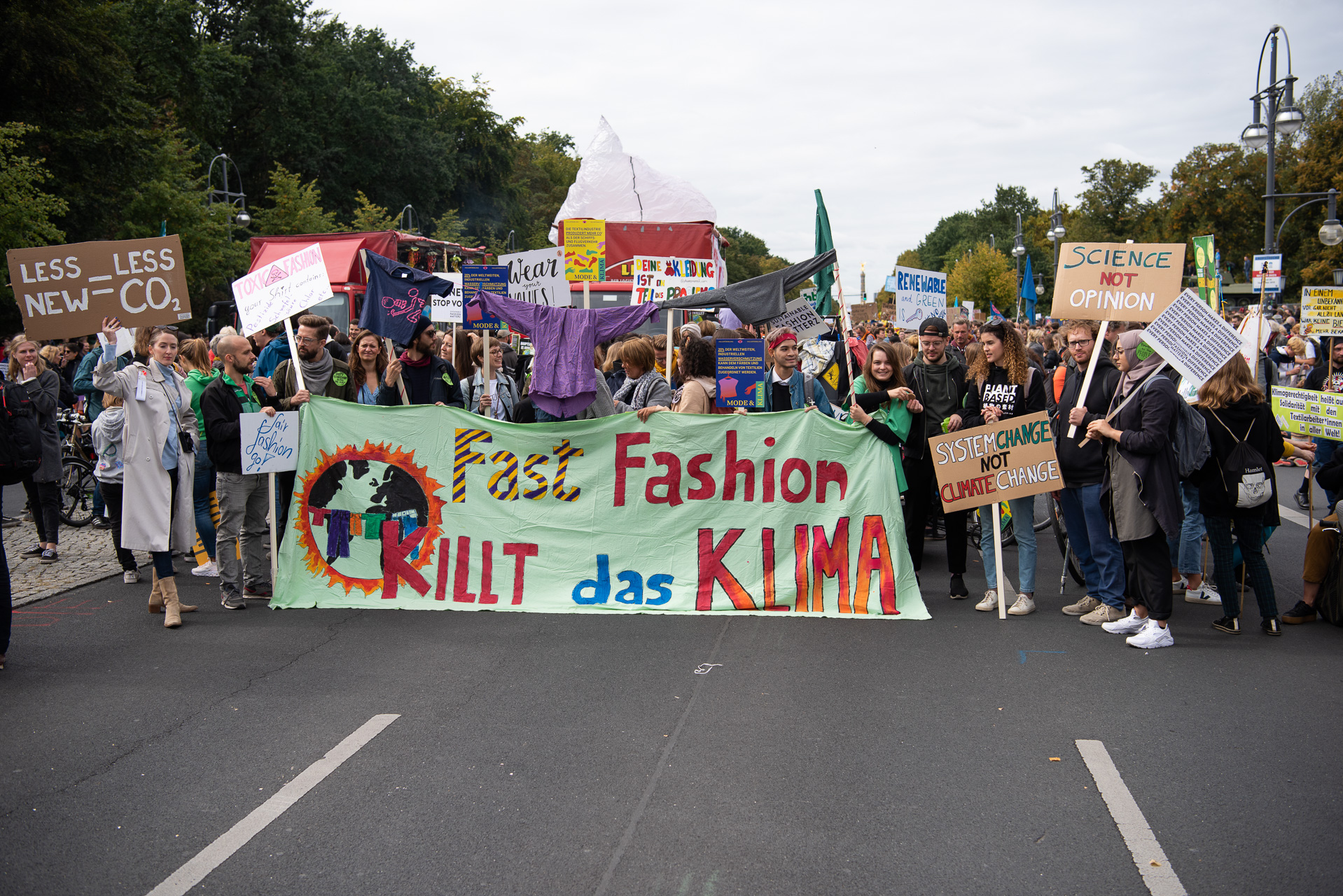
Protest on environmental impact of fast fashion

The fashion industry contributes to 20% of wastewater. Ellen MacArthur notes that a t-shirt requires over 2,000 liters of water to make. Fast fashion consumes large amounts of water, while processes such as dyeing and fiber production pollute waterways and release microplastics.

In 2014, journalist Elizabeth L. Cline, author of Overdressed: The Shockingly High Cost of Cheap Fashion and one of the earliest critics of fast fashion, noted that Americans purchase five times the amount of clothing than they did in 1980.

In the United Kingdom, textile consumption surged by 37% from 2001 to 2005. In 2018, global fiber production reached 107 million metric tons.

According to the European Environment Agency, the European Union generated an estimated 6.95 million tonnes of textile waste in 2020, equivalent to around 16 kg per person. Of this, about 4.4 kg per person was collected separately for reuse and recycling, while 11.6 kg per person ended up in mixed household waste.

As a whole, the textile industry occupies roughly 5% of all landfill space. As of 2018, the clothing industry produced about 92 million tons of textile waste annually, much of which is burned or goes into a landfill and less than 1% of used clothing is recycled into new garments. The clothing that is discarded into landfills is often made from non-biodegradable synthetic materials.

Pesticides and dyes are released into the environment by fashion-related operations. The growing demand for quick fashion continuously adds effluent release from the textile factories, containing both dyes and caustic solutions.

The materials used not only affect the environment in textile products, but also the workers and the people who wear the clothes. The hazardous substances affect all aspects of life and release into the environments around them.

Optoro estimates that 5 billion pounds of waste is generated through returns each year.

Between 2000 and 2019, fast fashion production doubled, with brands such as Zara producing 24 collections a year and H&M producing about 12 to 16 collections a year. The fast fashion industry relies on complicated, very extensive worldwide supply chains that drive environmental degradation.

Raw materials are extracted from land that is used for intensive agricultural production. As of 2022, fast fashion contributed 20% of all global wastewater, using about 93 billion cubic metres of water annually for manufacturing.

Garments are produced in factories, often located in low labor cost countries, and sometimes under conditions of labor exploitation. The focus of the industry on fast production and consumption cycles leads to overproduction, waste, and pollution.

Synthetic materials, such as polyester, which is manufactured from fossil fuels, contribute even more to environmental deterioration. Moreover, 92 million tons of textile waste, disposed of in landfills or by incineration, also contributes to pollution and water body contamination with microplastics. The environmental impact of fast fashion is a serious issue that a lot of the population does not acknowledge.

Fashion has significant impact during and after production. This industry is responsible for the pollution, waste, and carbon emission that is produced during the production of garments. The fashion industry produces 100 billion garments every year, and about 89% of their production goes into the landfill where they smoulder and pollute the air.

== Production and disposal of waste ==
According to the Environmental Protection Agency, 17 million tons of textile waste were produced in 2018 alone. Of those 17 million tons, 11.3 million tons of textile waste were discarded in landfills, 3.2 million tons were incinerated with energy recovery, and only 2.5 million tons were recycled. When textile clothing ends up in landfills, chemicals on the clothes such as the dye can leech into the ground and cause environmental damage. When unsold clothing is burned, it may pollute the air. In 2019, France announced that it was making an effort to prevent companies from this practice of burning unsold fashion items. Fashion is produced at such high and fast rates, that more than 40% of fashion goods are sold at a markdown.

Donations are often seen as a way to eliminate textile waste, however less than 20% of donated clothes go to thrift stores. Textiles that do not go to charities, landfills, or are recycled, are sent to developing countries in large bundles. There, they overwhelm waste management infrastructure and end up polluting local rivers, streams, and communities.

The packaging of clothing also contributes to the waste produced by the fashion industry. As online shopping, both for clothing and for other items, has become common, the amount of waste produced has totaled about 75 million tons in the United States alone. Many packaging materials are also non-recyclable.

== Sustainability efforts ==
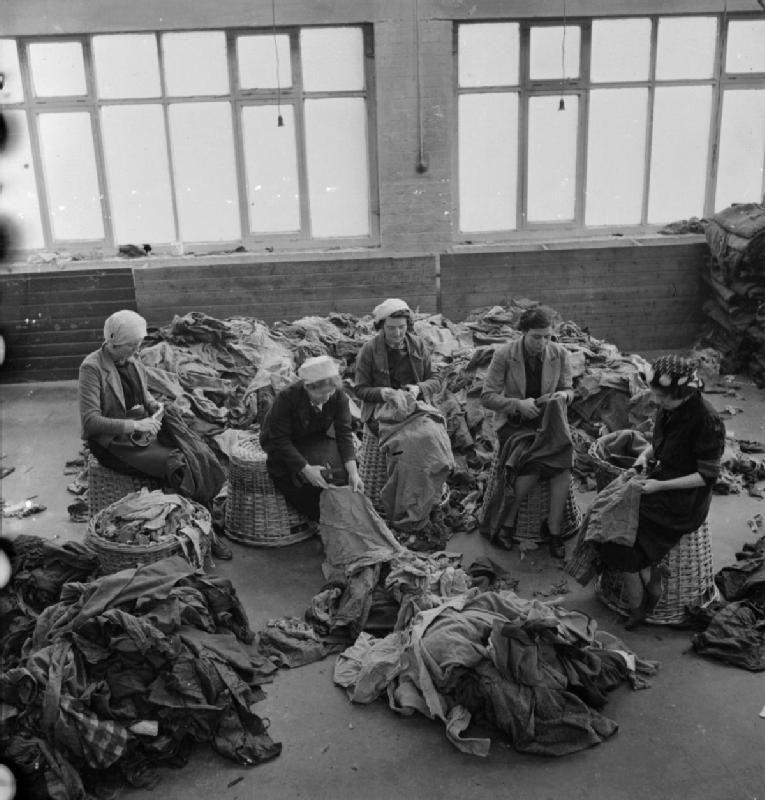
British women in World War II cutting salvaged clothes and rags for recycling.

The consumer use phase in the life cycle of clothing and other textiles is a significant area of impact, yet is often overlooked. While there is minimal research into energy efficient washers and dryers as a method of reducing impact on the consumer side, wearing garments for 9 months longer could cut overall waste by 22% and water use by 33%. On the producer side, choosing to make garments in popular colors and designs that consumers are more likely to buy is both a financially and environmentally responsible choice. Designing clothing that is more likely to be purchased can reduce waste on the production side. In 2018 the fashion retailer H&M ended up with $4.3 billion of unsold merchandise. Other retailers, such as Patagonia, have made efforts to create more sustainable clothing by using eco-friendly materials, such as organically farmed cotton and polyester made from recycled plastic bottles.

In order to extend the life cycle of garments and slow rates of production and overconsumption, business models such as 'clothing libraries' have been considered. These businesses collect pieces both from local shops and companies, and allow customers, who pay for a monthly subscription, to borrow clothes for a certain period of time. Business startups such as these have been tested in the Netherlands and Sweden, but there are concerns that clothing libraries will have little to no effect on reducing the effects.

=== Slow fashion ===
Slow fashion is a movement that seeks to oppose fast fashion, focusing on the production and sale of sustainable clothing created with eco-friendly materials. The movement encourages purchasing clothing from local sources as opposed to large brands, as these locally made pieces are often of a higher quality and will last longer than factory-made clothing, and will reduce pollution caused by the disposal of clothes. The slow fashion movement also challenges the ethical issues of fast fashion, such as the underpaying and overworking of factory workers, who often come from low-income countries.

== Deforestation and land use ==
The fashion industry's demand for goods like leather contribute heavily to deforestation and land use changes especially in tropical regions. As deforestation contributes to biodiversity loss and climate change, fixing the risk in the fashion supply chain is pivotal. Sustainable supply chain management with the importance of transparency is a possible solution. It focuses on traceability which makes sure of responsible sourcing which could help prevent the socio-environmental impacts coming with leather production.

Leather production, especially bovine leather is linked to deforestation in places like Brazil, where they need to clear the land for large scale cattle ranching. This is part of a bigger issue of "deforestation risk" which requires clearing native vegetation for production.

== See also ==
- Circular fashion – Application of circular economy to the fashion industry
- Digital Product Passport
- Textile recycling – Method of reusing or reprocessing used clothing, fibrous material and rags
- Trashion – Fashion made with trash
- Zero-waste fashion – Sustainable clothing design
