= Digital fashion =

Visual representation of clothing with digital software

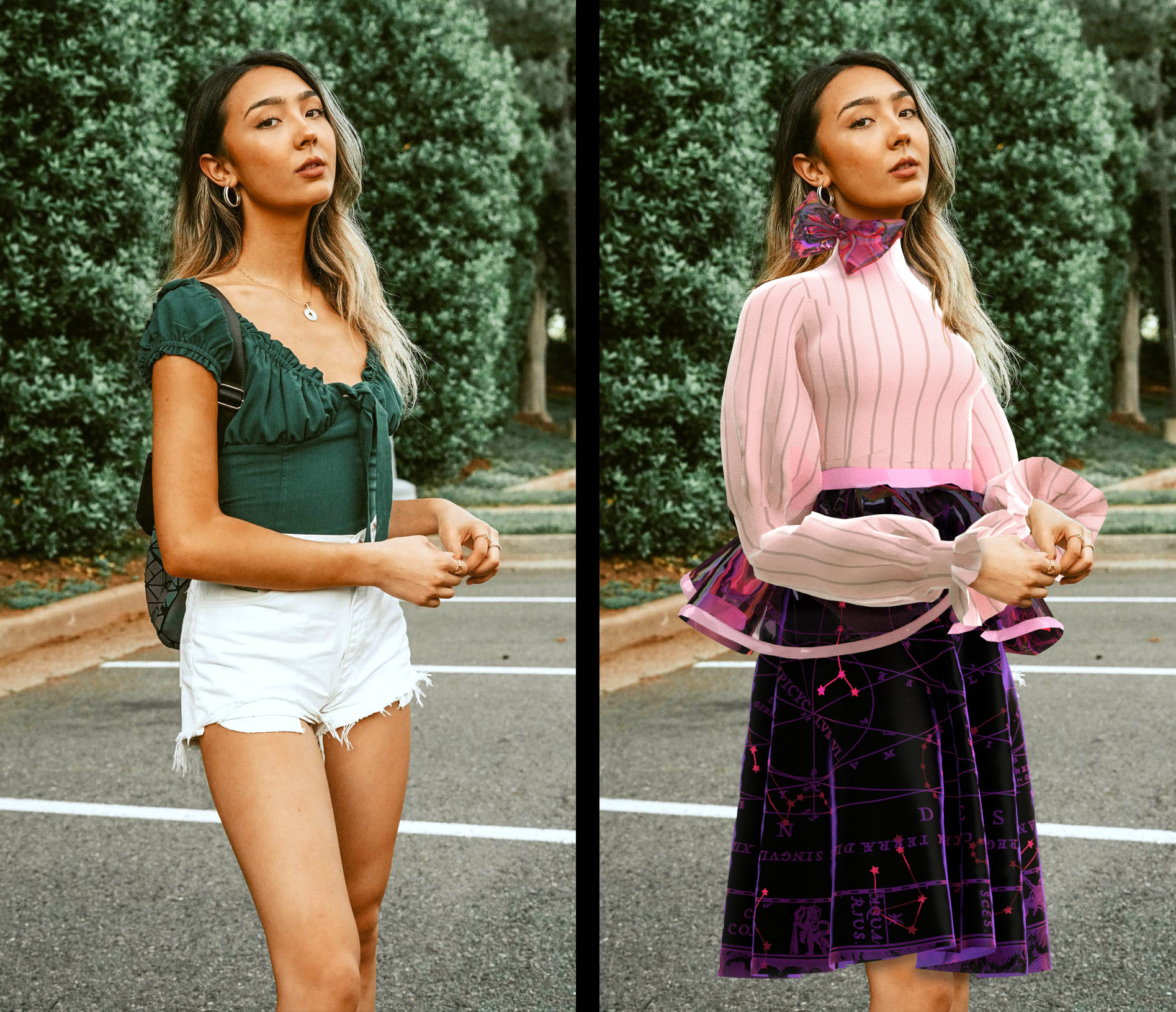
Digital fashion garments can be posed and composited onto photographs which can then be uploaded to social media to showcase the outfit.

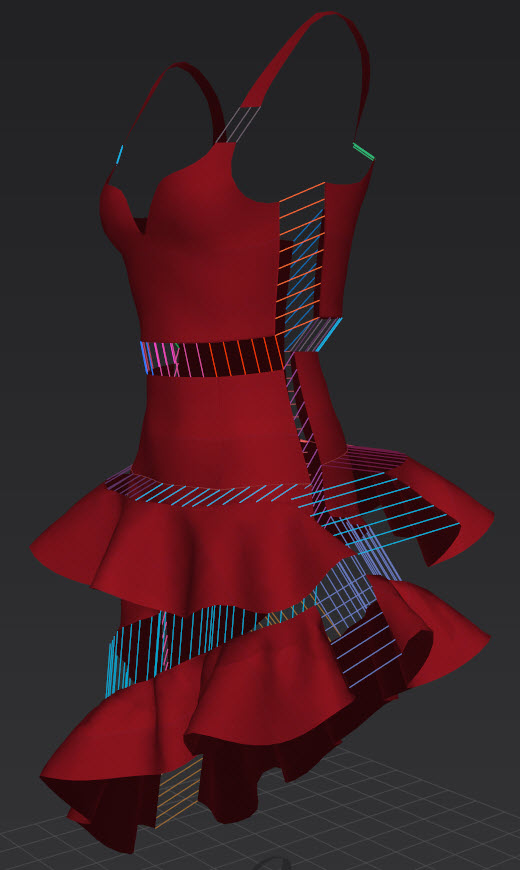
Digital clothing created with Marvelous Designer

Digital fashion is a field of fashion design that relies on 3D software or artificial intelligence to produce hyper-realistic, data-intensive digital 3D garment simulations that are digital-only products or digital models for physical products. Digital garments can be worn and presented in virtual environments, social media, online gaming, virtual reality (VR), and augmented reality (AR) platforms. The field aims to contribute to the development of a more sustainable future for the fashion industry. It has been praised as a possible answer to ethical and creative concerns of traditional fashion by promoting innovation, reducing waste, and encouraging conscious consumption.

However, empirical research has questioned whether digital fashion communities embody the radical and anti-consumerist values they claim. A 2025 study presented by YeSeung Lee at the FACTUM international conference on fashion communication analysed 88,141 posts across nine platforms over eight months using Pulsar. It found that only 4.8% of author biographies indicated any sociopolitical focus, and that discourse predominantly relied on generic slogans and trending buzzwords, primarily reinforcing existing fashion hierarchies and consumerist frameworks rather than challenging them.

Digital fashion is also the interplay between digital technology and couture. Human AI is an intersection of technology and human representation, in which human value is emphasized and enhanced by technology and the possibilities of discovering design. Information and communication technologies (ICTs) have been deeply integrated both into the fashion industry, as well as within the experience of clients and prospects. Such interplay has happened at three main levels.

1. ICTs are used to design and produce fashion products, while the industry organization also leverages digital technologies.
2. ICTs impact marketing, distribution and sales.
3. ICTs are extensively used in communication activities with all relevant stakeholders and contribute to co-create the fashion world.

The fashion industry in general has paved the way for digital fashion to be introduced with more technology being in the industry, like virtual dressing rooms and the gamification of the fashion industry. Digital fashion is also seen on many different online fashion retail websites. This evolution in the fashion industry has called for more education and research of digital fashion.

== Design, production, and organization ==
Among the many applications available to fashion designers to model the fusion of creativity with digital avenues, the Digital Textile Printing can be mentioned here.

=== Digital textile printing ===
Digital textile printing has brought together the worlds of fashion, technology, art, chemistry, and printing to produce a new process for printing textiles on clothing.

Digital printing is a process in which prints are directly applied to fabrics with a printer, reducing 95% of the use of water, 75% of the use of energy and minimizing textile waste. The main advantage of digital printing is the ability to do very small runs of each design (even less than 1 yard).

Digital Textile printing also offers other benefits, such as fast printing speeds that help the time and space needed to print different patterns on garments of choice.

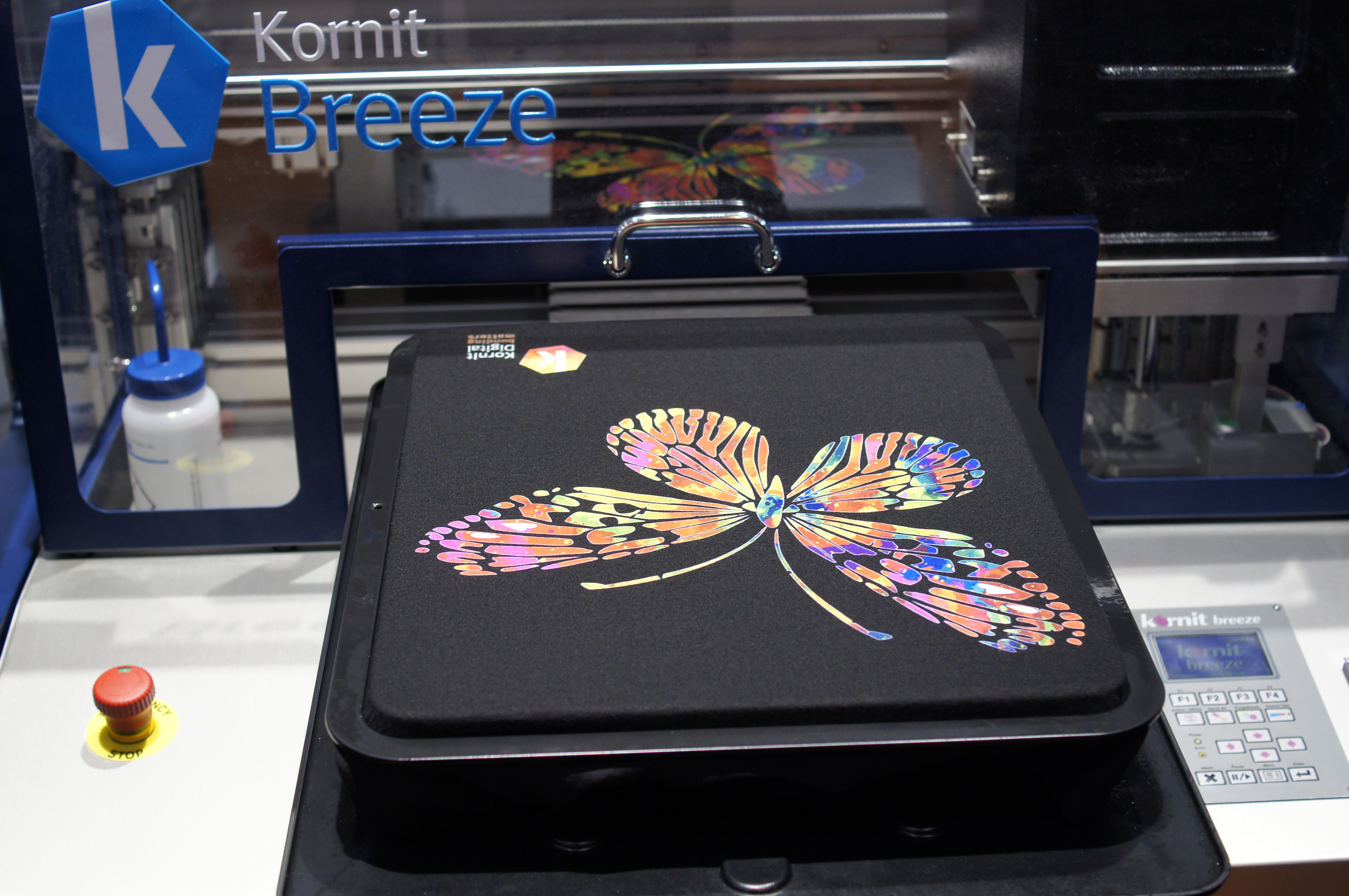
Example of digital textile printing using an Inkjet printer to create a butterfly design on a t-shirt using water-based color ink

== Marketing, distribution, and sales ==
While all digital channels can be used in order to market and sell fashion completely online (eCommerce), they usually are implemented in connection with offline channels (so-called "omni-channel"). Here, virtual and augmented reality play a crucial role.

The fashion industry has faced its own problems including pollution and fabric waste, which has resulted in a shift to more sustainable methods like digital fashion. The industry is also constantly being intertwined with digital media and has allowed for the use of digital tools within the business itself and with consumers. Two of the ways digital fashion is utilized with consumers is through virtual dressing rooms and virtual cosmetic counters.

Prospects and clients can use ICTs - own computers, tablets and smartphones - to virtually simulate fitting rooms and cosmetics counters and see how they look in specific outfits and makeup. Customers can give any look and decide on what suits them and buy products.

Oftentimes, beauty retailers will feature virtual fitting rooms to allow users to experience the look of their product before committing to a purchase. Some examples are color contact retailers Freshlook, which allows users to simulate contact lens wear in their color contacts studio before purchase. Colorful Eyes also offers a virtual color contact lens try-on room.

=== Virtual dressing room ===
A virtual dressing room (also often referred to as virtual fitting room and virtual changing room although they do perform different functions) is the online equivalent of the near-ubiquitous in-store changing room – that is, it enables shoppers to try on clothes to check one or more of size, fit or style, but virtually rather than physically.

Fashion retailer Topshop installed a Kinect-powered virtual fitting room at its Moscow store. Created by AR Door, the Augmented Fitting Room system overlays 3D augmented reality clothes on the customer. Simple gestures and on-screen buttons let users "try on" different outfits. However, the high variability of virtual fit platforms to predict consumer clothes sizes called into question the accuracy of these systems in their current form.

AI-powered Wardrobe and Outfit Planning

Beyond virtual fitting rooms, the integration of artificial intelligence has enabled the rise of digital wardrobe management. These platforms use computer vision and machine learning to catalog a user’s physical or digital garments, providing automated outfit recommendations based on weather, occasion, and personal style trends. Fashion-tech startups utilize AI-driven garment simulation to help users plan outfits virtually, bridging the gap between digital-only fashion and physical wardrobe utility. This "smart closet" approach aims to reduce "wardrobe fatigue" and decrease unnecessary consumption by maximizing the use of existing items through digital visualization.

=== Communication and experience co-creation ===
Fashion is also a matter of socially negotiating what is "in" or "out", fashionable or not. In other words, fashion items do not only play on the economic market of physical goods but also - and sometimes even more importantly - on the semiotic market of the production of social tastes and customs. Thanks to social media, and to all services offered by the so-called web2.0, laypeople can contribute to co-create the fashion world, shaping tastes, customs, and fashion-related values.

In many cultures, social media has influenced the dissemination of fashion trends and consumer behavior. The fashion industry, including fast fashion, has been shaped by production methods and is evolving due to digital technology.

Social media has also helped evolve to a point where not only can brands reach consumers, but consumers can reach brands as well. TikTok for example started a trend in 2020 with #GucciModelChallenge. This creates a space where the brand is gaining awareness from their consumers in the ever-changing digital age.

=== Gamification ===
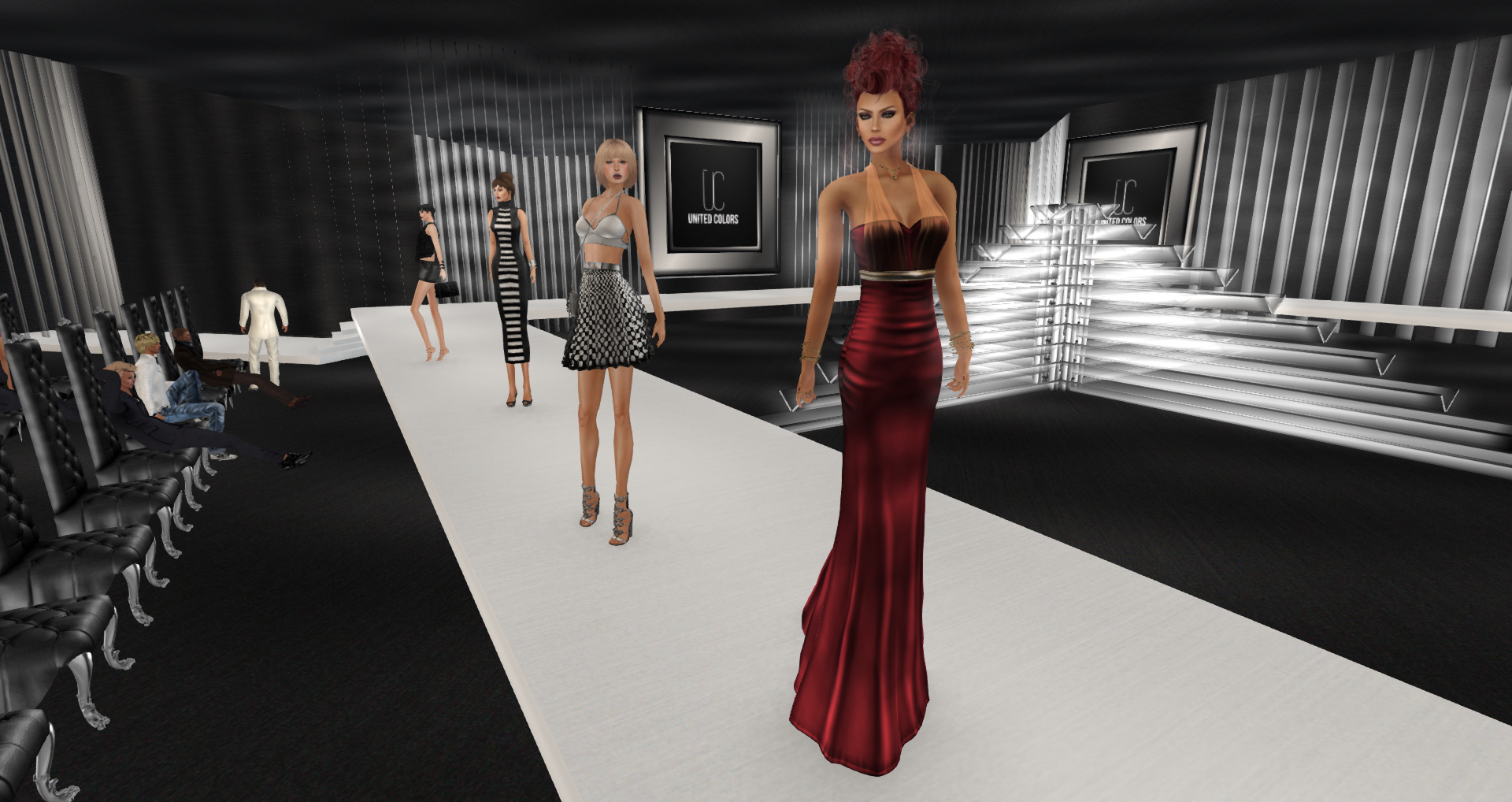
Virtual runway show in the game Second Life

Gaming has played an important role in fostering digital aspects of the fashion world, first beginning with dress-up games that used avatars and allowed players to select garments. Nevertheless, it seems it will now move on to the real world and start using avatars of real people.

Garments from luxurious brands have been copied and adapted into the aesthetics of games such as Animal Crossing: New Horizons and The Sims. As to the former, during COVID-19 lock-downs players recreated outfits from a variety of fashion brands, including Chanel, Gucci and Versace. It became a platform for users to showcase their costume designs.

In April 2019, Moschino collaborated with simulation game The Sims in a capsule collection that featured signature Jeremy Scott garments. The collection was made available to shop and the campaign was set against the backdrop of a Sims-like atmosphere. Furthermore, in May 2019, Nike partnered up with Fortnite to include their iconic Jordan sneakers. In similar fashion, in May 2020, Marc Jacobs designed 6 of the brand's favorite looks for Nintendo's Animal Crossing: New Horizons in a partnership with Instagram user @AnimalCrossingFashionArchive. They were made available to download.

Similarly, the other luxury brands mentioned, Louis Vuitton partnered with game League of Legends to create skins for characters within the game. Digital fashion in different video games allows users to express themselves beyond their avatars and combine the self-expression of fashion into the digital gaming realm.

== Digital fashion education and research ==
Nowadays, the fashion industry needs experts in digital fashion, equipped with the above-sketched knowledge and competencies. Several Bachelor and Master programs in Fashion have, in recent years, integrated Digital Fashion courses.

An example is Ravensbourne University's 'Digital Technology for Fashion Pathway,' launching October 2021. This new pathway will offer BA Fashion students the option to specialise in digital fashion with a focus on emerging technologies within this field. The Ravensbourne BA Fashion Class of 2020 paved the way for this new offering by collaborating with the gaming department and launching a digital fashion game live and in partnership with Twitch in July 2020, and featured in Forbes as 'Visionary.'

In 2021, University for the Creative Arts became the first major arts university to launch a new postgraduate higher education degree in Digital Fashion, the first Master's course of its kind in the UK. This new course allows creative researchers to learn how to create garments which are completely free from the material world, and how to fit them digitally to a client – whether they are a model for a virtual catwalk, a social media influencer looking to boost their reach, a gaming avatar in need of a fashion edge or a movie character being given a bespoke costume.

While there are not (yet) dedicated scientific journals devoted to the topic, several research activities have been done in the field. Among them, a dedicated conference took place in 2015 in Seoul, South Korea. SComS - Studies in Communication Sciences, a Swiss-based Communication Journal, has published a special thematic section on Fashion communication: Between tradition and digital transformation. In July 2019, a conference titled FACTUM19 - Fashion Communication: between tradition and future digital developments has taken place in Ascona (Switzerland), whose proceedings are published by Springer. During FACTUM19, a document titled "Fashion Communication Research. A way ahead" has been published.

Fashion is closely related with Art and Heritage. Several museums related to fashion have started to make their appearance in the past thirty years. Examples are the Museum Christian Dior Granville, the Museum Cristobal Balenciaga, The Armani Silos, The Museum Audemars Piguet. Among the most important initiatives to digitize fashion history, thus making such heritage available to researchers, practitioners and all interested people, two projects can be mentioned: Europeana Fashion and We Wear Culture by Google Arts and Culture.

== The rise of digital fashion during COVID-19 ==
Since the beginning of the 2020 pandemic, the fashion industry has suffered strong economic losses, as sales plummeted and jobs were lost, but it has since learned to digitally recover through virtual clothing, catwalks, and showrooms.

Amidst the COVID-19 pandemic, fashion is among the industries that have been forced to adapt their commercial and creative strategies to better suit the social distancing measures. Therefore, the digital channel has since seen a rise in use, offering live shopping and has been highlighted as the only way to overcome physical barriers. It is also believed that these changes will prevail in years to come, as reported by WGSN.

Among these circumstances, new digital fashion houses were born, looking to push the boundaries of design, innovation and sustainability: Tribute Brand, The Fabricant, Auroboros and RTFKT.

Once events only attended by selected people, catwalks and showrooms have become more accessible through live streaming and virtual fashion shows. Thus, they have resulted in high fashion becoming more procurable to the general public. Milan Fashion Week was renamed “Milan Digital Fashion Week” and the New York version prioritized outdoor spaces to further prevent the spread and set the maximum capacity at 50. The British Fashion Council also took upon the opportunity to show this year's designs online. In a historic moment at London Fashion Week 2021, the digital fashion house Auroboros became the first brand to present a solely virtual collection at a major international fashion week. Consequently, many celebrities decided to watch fashion shows that they used to attend front row from the comfort of their own homes and showed their glamorous looks from their Instagram pages.

In 2021, big virtual fashion events are becoming more common. An example of this is the International Digital Fashion Week. With this event, there is the largest virtual fashion show being held with over 100 designers in the fashion industry being represented. This has occurred as a result to the COVID-19 pandemic. However, now digital fashion has a chance to thrive in a new technology and fashion fusion industry.

The importance of fashion films has also been stressed as a medium to creatively show designers' upcoming collections. As a result, methods that were only used by digitally focused houses, such as The Fabricant, are expected to become the norm. Therefore, 3D experiences have gained momentum. As a matter of fact, high-profile models such as Bella Hadid have already incorporated such advanced and revolutionary practices into their curriculum, as seen in an Instagram post that displays the star getting a full body 3D scan for a Mugler Spring Summer 2021 film. The video shows her in a gold outfit as Pegasus, against the backdrop of a fantasy-filled world.

Other embraced formats include avatar video games such as Zepeto, which Louboutin partnered up with to showcase their SS21 collection. This way, attendees could create personalized avatars and view the brand's latest designs. On June 15, Balmain also resorted to digital fashion and created a virtual showroom hosted by the avatar of creative director Oliver Rousteing, who posted on Instagram his face getting 3D scanned, adding "#future".

Additionally, for their SS21 show, the Italian streetwear brand GCDS recreated a 3D runway with cutting-edge technology and avatars that displayed the digitally rendered clothes. They even incorporated the celebrity avatars of Dua Lipa, Anwar Hadid, Chiara Ferragni and Fedez, to name a few. They were shown sitting front row in the audience as if it had been a traditional show. It was referred to by the brand as the "first digital front row". The role of avatars influencers such as Lil Miquela and Noonoouri has been emphasized as well and definitely had an impact on the fashion industry during the pandemic, as they encouraged sales with the promotion of fashion brands.

One advantage of the digitalization of fashion is being eco-friendly, as it reduces fabric waste. Opposing beliefs state that clothing is only meant to be worn in real life and that the process involved with sewing has always been sacred.

== The Emergence of the NFT Clothes Industry ==
NFTs, unique digital assets that use blockchain technology to verify ownership and provenance, have been adopted by various industries for their ability to create, trade, and tokenize digital content. The NFT clothes industry is a natural extension of this trend, applying the same concept to digital fashion items. As virtual worlds, gaming platforms, and online social spaces become increasingly popular, the demand for customizable digital avatars and unique virtual outfits has grown. NFT clothes cater to this demand, offering users a way to stand out in the digital crowd.

The rise of the NFT clothes industry could present both opportunities and challenges for the traditional fashion sector. On the one hand, it allows designers to explore new creative possibilities without the constraints of physical materials and production costs. This opens up the potential for collaborations with digital artists and programmers, paving the way for more innovative designs and a broader audience reach.

It is claimed that the NFT clothes industry could promote sustainability by reducing waste, pollution, and resource consumption associated with physical fashion production.

== See also ==
- Cloth modeling
- History of Western fashion
- Index of fashion articles
- Fast fashion
