= Fast fashion in China =

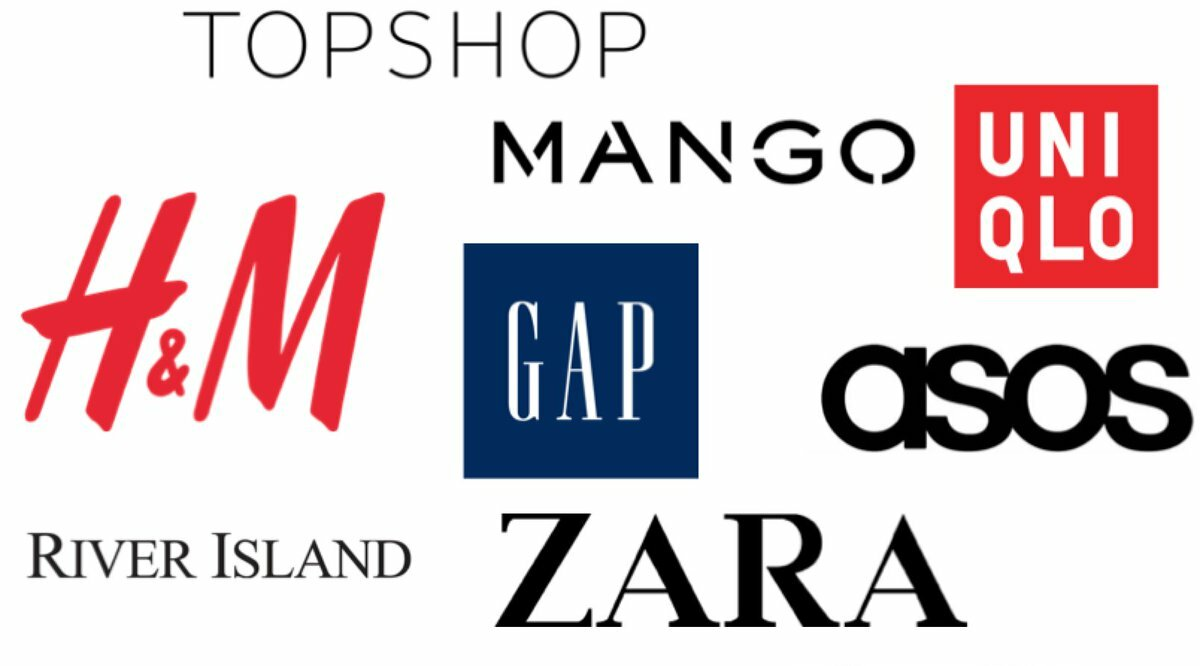
Fast fashion brands popular in China

Fast fashion is a term used to represent cheap, trendy clothing that is made to replicate higher-end fashion trends. In 2019, China was the leading producer of fast fashion clothing. Many sweatshops are located in China; there, workers are underpaid and overworked in unsafe environments. Overall, China produced 65% of the world's clothing in 2021, with a majority of these clothes being labeled as fast fashion. The top 10 competitors in the fast-fashion market made up 29.13% of the whole fashion market in 2020.

== Concept ==
Low wages and labor-intensive operations have historically characterized the garment industry. However, since the turn of the twenty-first century, China's globalization has led to the proliferation of the fast fashion industry, appealing to developing nations due to its inexpensive labor and lenient regulations. This has resulted in an industry marked by overconsumption and waste.

In previous years, trendy fashion was considered a luxury and was available at high prices. However, this has changed, as developing countries increasingly produce inexpensive clothing to meet demand from foreign investors and overseas markets. Its success is attributed to its broad appeal to different tastes, attracting a wide range of consumers. Another key aspect of fast fashion is its speed of production, with brands producing garments quickly so that they can be brought to market as soon as possible.

== The Industry in China ==
After recent years of tremendous economic growth in China, fast fashion consumption made its way into the lives of not only Chinese people but of people worldwide as well. Brands such as Shein, Zara, H&M, Uniqlo, and Zaful have dominated the fashion world. Shein dominates the fast fashion industry since it was founded 2008. In 2023, Shein emitted over 16.7 million metric tons of CO2 emissions. Residents in populated cities such as Beijing are starting to favor fast fashion brands over big-name brands in order to keep up with changing trends. A 2024 study based on 290 valid survey responses from fast fashion firms in China identified six key factors associated with supply chain performance: consumer orientation, inventory management, production management, logistics management, information systems and technology, and supplier orientation. Among these factors, consumer orientation and production management were significantly and positively associated with all six supply chain performance measures examined in the study.

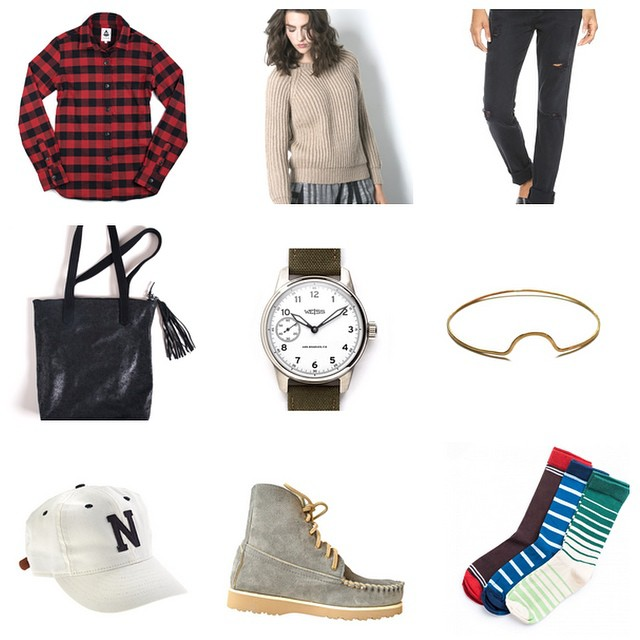
Minimalistic Wardrobe Avoids Overconsumption

In 2021, the fashion industry generated $31 billion globally. China, in particular, accounted for 32% of total brand clothing sales in 2017 alone. The rapid consumption lifestyle that China has taken on has contributed to the increase of fast fashion. The use of inexpensive materials and labor contributes to China's ability to maintain high production levels while keeping their economic debt minimal. By producing more fast fashion pieces, the economy benefits. However, rapid production of fashion comes at a cost of perpetuating the climate crisis, such as through marine pollution, cotton cultivation, and increased carbon emissions.

Fast fashion exists not only because it helps the economy but also because it fulfills a high-consumption lifestyle popular in Western countries. In addition, how fast fashion is marketed contributes to its fast consumption; fast fashion clothing is meant to be worn for the duration of a short-term trend. Once the trend is over, it may be disposed of, and its affordability encourages a lack of guilt over its waste. However, the amount of clothing that is quickly bought and discarded thus increases the amount of waste produced, exacerbating its environmental impact.

== Notable Companies ==
=== Shein ===
Shein is an online platform that quickly grew into a major global fast fashion retailer. It uses a digital business model based on e-commerce platforms, data analysis, and fast supply chains to quickly respond to fashion trends and customer demand. The company targets young consumers and has become very popular among Gen Z and younger Millennial shoppers because of the low prices and wide range of styles. Overall, Shein reflects the shift in the fashion industry toward faster and more algorithmic retail systems.

Shein's supply chain relies on a network of small manufacturers, mainly based in China. This allows it to produce and release new items very quickly. The company is reported to launch thousands of new products every day, which explains its strong position in the fast fashion market. However, with this rapid production model comes an environmental impact and poor labor conditions. Shein's transportation-related carbon emissions increased by 13.7% in 2024, reflecting the environmental impact of its production and global shipping model. Despite these issues, Shein continues to grow and remains a leading retailer in the fast fashion industry.

=== Tmall ===
Tmall Global is a third-party cross-border e-commerce platform business model that supplies imported goods from overseas directly to consumers in China. In the four years since its establishment, Tmall Global has expanded its operations and become a representative of China's cross-border e-commerce platforms. Its operations cover 75 countries and regions, with more than 19,000 international brands registered on the platform. Its products span more than 3,900 categories, including mother and baby products, beauty, health, food, clothing, home goods, and personal care.

The high volume of traffic and popularity of the Tmall Global platform have attracted overseas investors interested in entering the Chinese market. In 2018, the number of overseas brand registrations on Tmall Global increased by 122% year-on-year, with the fastest growth recorded in the second quarter, when registrations increased by more than 150% year-on-year. By the end of the second quarter, the total number of brand registrations had exceeded the figure for the whole of 2017. Alibaba's Tmall Global has also established cooperative relationships with the governments of several countries, including France and Italy, which are home to well-known brands.

In terms of luxury fashion and lifestyle, millennials account for more than 70% of Tmall's consumers and the category's gross merchandise value (GMV). Although Generation Z's contribution to the category's GMV was less than 5%, this consumer group recorded year-on-year (YoY) growth of more than 100% and a corresponding GMV growth rate of more than 150% in 2020. Furthermore, Generation Z's annual spending, which was less than half that of millennials, was expected to increase as members of the younger cohort entered the workforce and their incomes grew.

Temu

Temu is the international offshoot of the e-commerce giant PDD Holdings (the Chinese parent company of Pinduoduo) founded by Chen Lei, Colin Huang, and Zhao Jiazhen in China of 2015. The growing parent company became a giant by using social buying group deals and connecting agricultural producers directly to the consumers. In 2022, PDD Holdings decided to establish an international corporate presence and launched Temu in the United States in September 2022. Temu originally stood for "Team up, Price Down", reflecting the parent company's social-shopping and group-buying philosophy.

Temu ships goods straight from factories, connecting 80,000 to 100,000 manufacturers to consumers. However, unlike other direct fast-fashion rivals, Temu has a vast catalog ranging from home goods to electronics to clothes and even more. The increasing growth was a contribution of low prices, referral games, and widely spread advertisements such as the Superbowl and ongoing trends on social media. They share the same loophole as many other fast-fashion companies, using the "Next-Gen Manufacturing" and relying on tariff exemptions since any package under $800 can enter the country duty free and bypass rigorous customs inspections.

=== Uniqlo ===
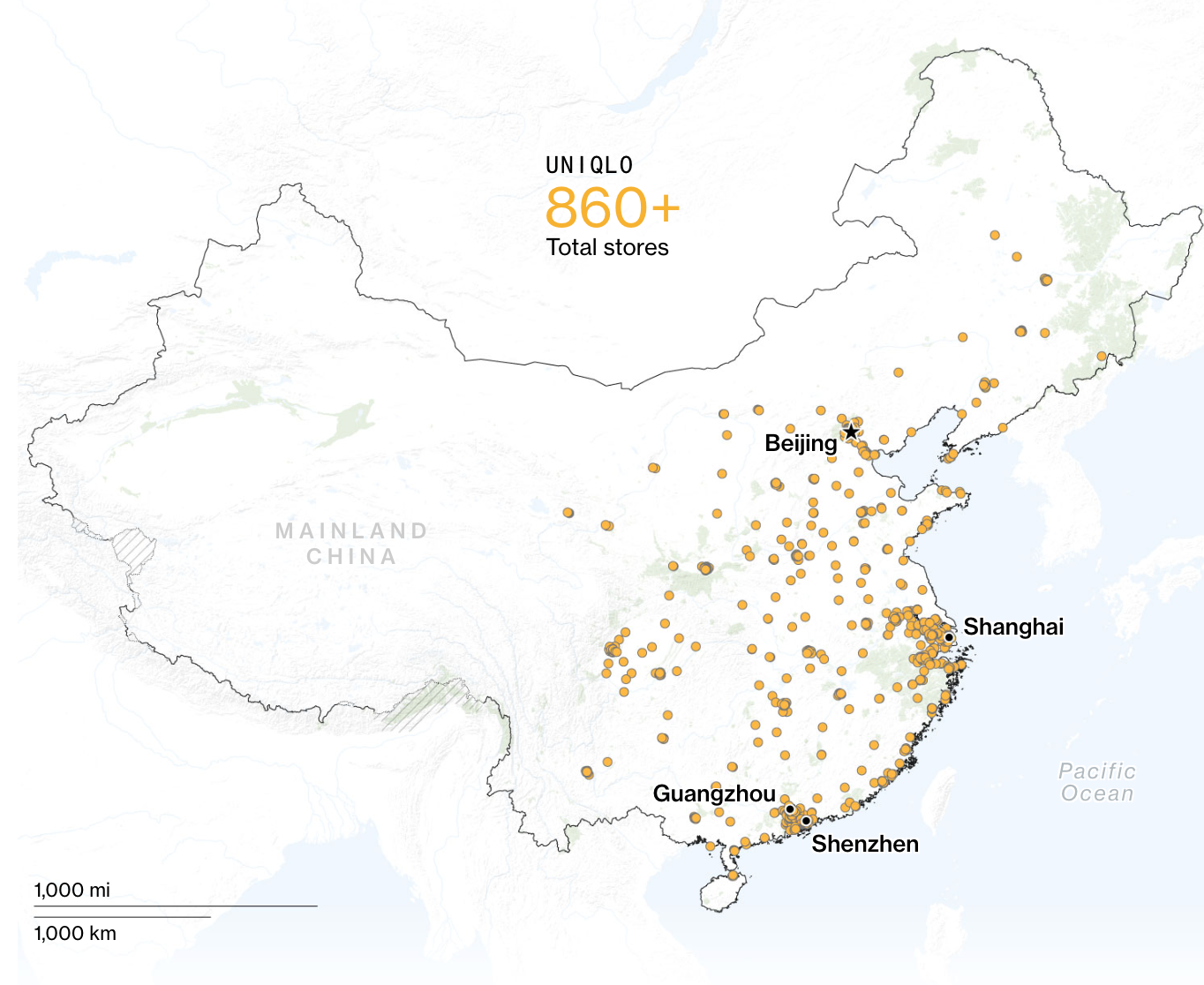
Uniqlo stores in China are concentrated around higher income regions.

Uniqlo, a Japanese-owned brand, was founded in 1974 by Tadashi Yanai. It is known for modern, casual apparel and essential, multi-functional garments. Despite China's anti-Japanese sentiment, Uniqlo secured 1.4% of China's $350 billion apparel market in 2021, which was larger than any other brand that year. Uniqlo was not only a hit in China but the rest of the world as well with 43 stores in the U.S. alone.

The difference between Uniqlo and most other fast fashion brands is that Uniqlo's garments are seen as high-quality while still remaining at an affordable price point. Many Chinese people associate Japanese goods with the highest caliber of quality. Uniqlo's success story has to do with their timing too: Yanai created the brand around when the Chinese middle class was increasing.

In terms of how ethical and environmentally friendly Uniqlo is, however, some have pointed out that it has not made sufficient progress. Like most brands, Uniqlo has set a climate change target to reduce carbon dioxide emissions. In its 2021 sustainability report, Uniqlo outlined steps to reducing water usage in jeans by 99%, reducing single-use plastic, and educating cotton farmers on agricultural chemicals. In 2020, Uniqlo stores in Japan increased their use of LED lights, leading to a 38.7% decrease of greenhouse gas emissions. While these statistics are on the brand's page, these targets are not accepted in the scientific community as sufficient ways to limit global warming.

=== Inditex ===
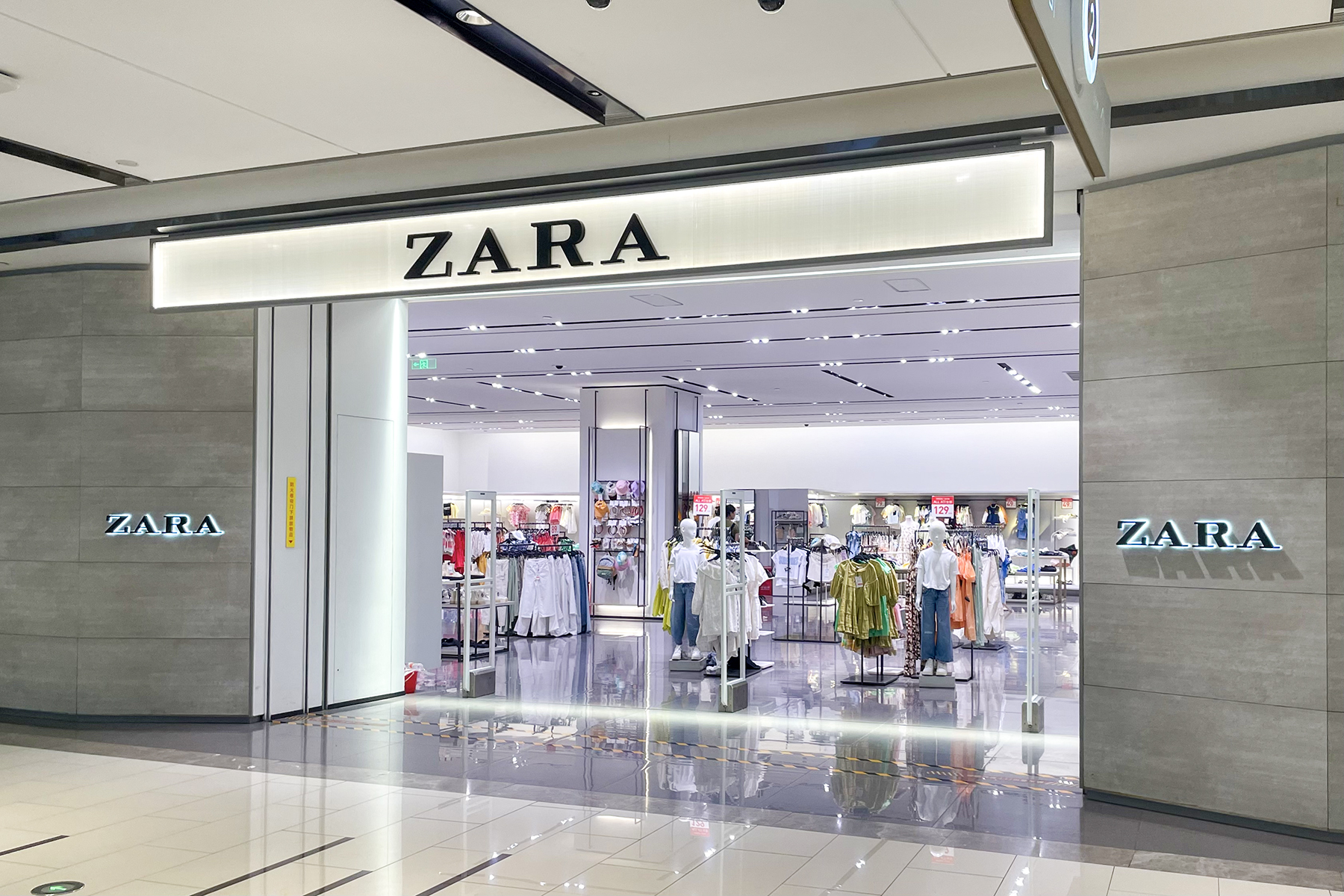
A Zara store in Zhengzhou

The most notable success story is Inditex, which owns companies such as Zara and Bershka. Inditex is a large brand with a net worth of $17.2 billion. Since its opening in 2007, it has opened over 330 stores in China by 2019. In particular, Zara is growing twice as fast as H&M due to its focus on value rather than price. Fast fashion, the term, was specifically coined by The New York Times in the nineties due to Zara's ability to produce a garment from start to finish in less than 20 days.

Inditex has targets to source fabrics more sustainably by 2025 and to have nothing sent to landfills by 2023. It is not uncommon that brands have recycling program policies implemented, but some question whether there's actually any follow-through.

==== H&M ====
Xinjiang, a province in Northwest China, is strategically important for China; not only is it the largest region there, but it's also a central hub for trading. While it's one of their poorest communities, it has high economic development. Additionally, it has an abundance of natural resources, as well as the Silk Road Economic Belt Project.

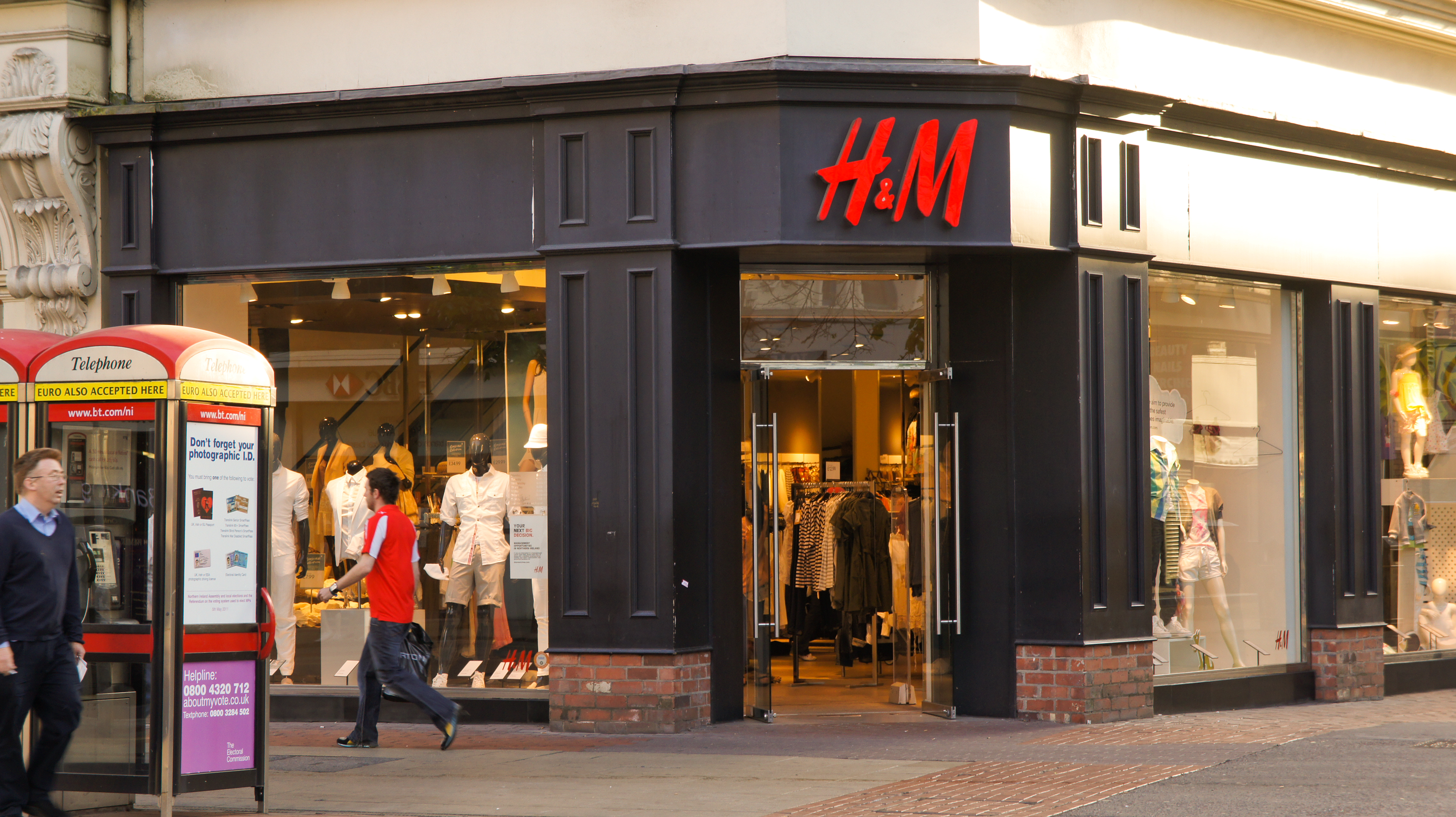
Belfast - H&M (5688674882)

Xinjiang also sources nearly 90% of China's cotton, outputting over 5.2 million tonnes. However, China also engages in detrimental human rights violations against the Muslim minority in Xinjiang. United States has imposed sanction on companies that are sourced from Xinjiang. Companies that have cut ties from China include H&M, Nike, and Zara.

In particular, H&M faced a huge boycott from China. The actor Huang Xuan, a brand ambassador for H&M in 2020, told CNN that they would never work with the company again. Beijing sent out a statement that these allegations are false and that the West is spreading lies. Nonetheless, many H&M shops in China have been forced to close. However, in 2022, H & M Hennes & Mauritz (H&M) reopened its official store on Tmall, more than a year after the Swedish retailer's online presence was removed from mainland China following the backlash over its refusal to use cotton from Xinjiang. A search on Tmall shows that H&M products are again available to consumers in mainland China, with 14.33 million subscribers registered on the platform.

== COVID-19 ==
As with many other industries in their peak, COVID put a pause on the textile industry, and China, in particular, implemented a Zero-COVID policy in August 2021. This reduced the amount of goods that could be shipped into China during a period of time. The policy negatively impacted fashion brands because it slowed down their production and reduced their shipments. Consumers also stopped buying as much and clothing sales in the US fell by 79%. However, COVID-19 didn't stop fast fashion altogether.

Zara's sales in 2020 made less than half of Shein's sales, threatening Zara's continued popularity. Meanwhile, Shein doubled its sales during 2020, with 35% of those sales accounting for Western clients. The reason for Shein's success, even during the COVID-19 pandemic, was due to their incredibly inexpensive clothing that remained affordable even amid crisis. In addition to affordable clothing, people turned to comfort as a priority and a trend toward leisurewear commenced. Consumers began buying more pajamas, sweat seats, and athleisure and traded out their tight jeans for baggy ones.

The pandemic also brought about a reassessment of the fashion industry and a call to change. Although there was a short hiatus in the industry's work towards the sustainable development goals, it picked its focus back up quickly. For example, H&M launched a summer dress collection as part of its Conscious range, as it continued on its journey to use only recycled and sustainably-sourced materials by 2030. In addition to retailers' focus on sustainability, consumers cared more about how their clothes were made than before the pandemic. 56% of consumer's agreed that sustainability is very or somewhat important when buying clothes. Consumer's also began to shop at and purchase second-hand more often and embrace pre-owned goods. The second-hand market in the US grew from $28B in 2019 to $49B in 2024, and is projected to hit $74B by 2029 as the stigma around used clothing diminishes.

== Environmental Impact ==
Despite the economic boost that the textile industry has provided, it also contributes negatively to the growing climate crisis. In recent years, fast fashion has majorly contributed to more plastic entering the ocean, overconsumption of goods, and increasing carbon emissions; in 2020, it was reported that the fashion industry accounts for 10% of global carbon dioxide emissions. In 2018, more than 10 different UN organizations pledged to establish a UN Alliance on Sustainable Fashion. A 2025 systematic review of research on fast fashion in six major garment-producing countries, including China, identified wastewater, sustainability, and environmental policy as important areas of research. The researchers also found that limited empirical research and a lack of consumer knowledge about the environmental effects of fast fashion remain barriers to improving sustainable clothing production.

=== Water Usage ===
Since the fast fashion industry relies heavily on water throughout its supply chain, it is one of the most water-intensive industries in manufacturing. Around 90 billion cubic meters of water are used every year for the fashion industry as part of the production and processing of textiles. A significant portion of this water use comes from cotton cultivation, which requires large amounts of irrigation and is often done in regions already facing water scarcity.

Water is also heavily used for dyeing and bleaching. During these stages, large volumes of freshwater are used and contaminated wastewater is often produced. These processes contribute to water pollution since it releases chemicals and untreated effluent into rivers and other water systems. Because of this, the fashion industry is responsible for a large share of global industrial wastewater and has a negative impact on environmental sustainability.

==== Marine Pollution ====
On average, between the years 2000 to 2014, people worldwide have bought 60% more clothes than before, and much of this growth was driven by China's desire to keep up with cheap new trends. Additionally, polyester, a common material used in clothing manufacturing, sheds thousands of microfibers with every wash, leading to a total of 500,000 tons of microfibers, equivalent to 50 billion plastic bottles, dumped into the ocean each year. It is estimated that one load of laundry produces up to 700,000 microfibers and other microscopic forms of plastic. A large portion of these plastics ends up on the ocean floor and does not decompose. Instead, they are consumed by fish and other marine species, allowing them to enter into the food chain. This not only causes harm to marine life but also poisons the food that people rely on as well.

=== Cotton Cultivation ===
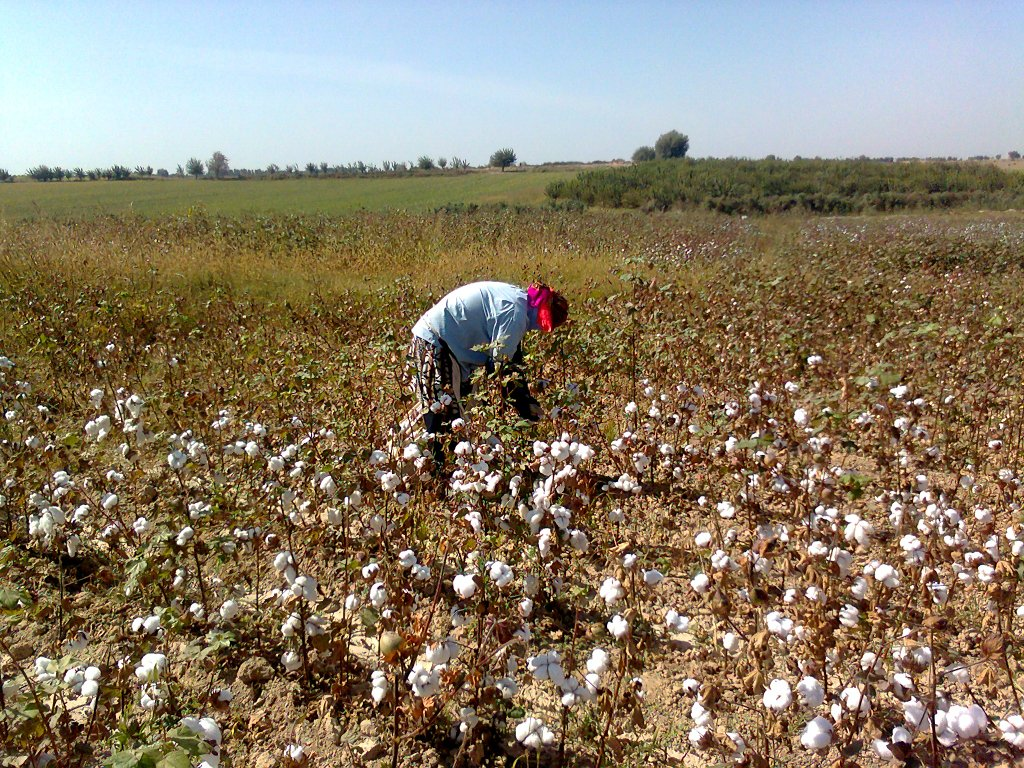
Cotton Cultivation

To produce 1 kilogram of cotton, nearly 15,000 liters of water are required. Since not all cotton is grown in rain-fed areas, it requires additional irrigation, which also adds to carbon dioxide emissions on top of water usage. More than 60% of all cotton production comes from irrigated farms. Additionally, places where cotton is grown in rain-fed areas also become areas that face drought issues. After clothing is made from cotton, it needs to be dyed, which takes in a lot of heat and releases harmful chemicals into surrounding waters and air.

==== Viscose Production ====
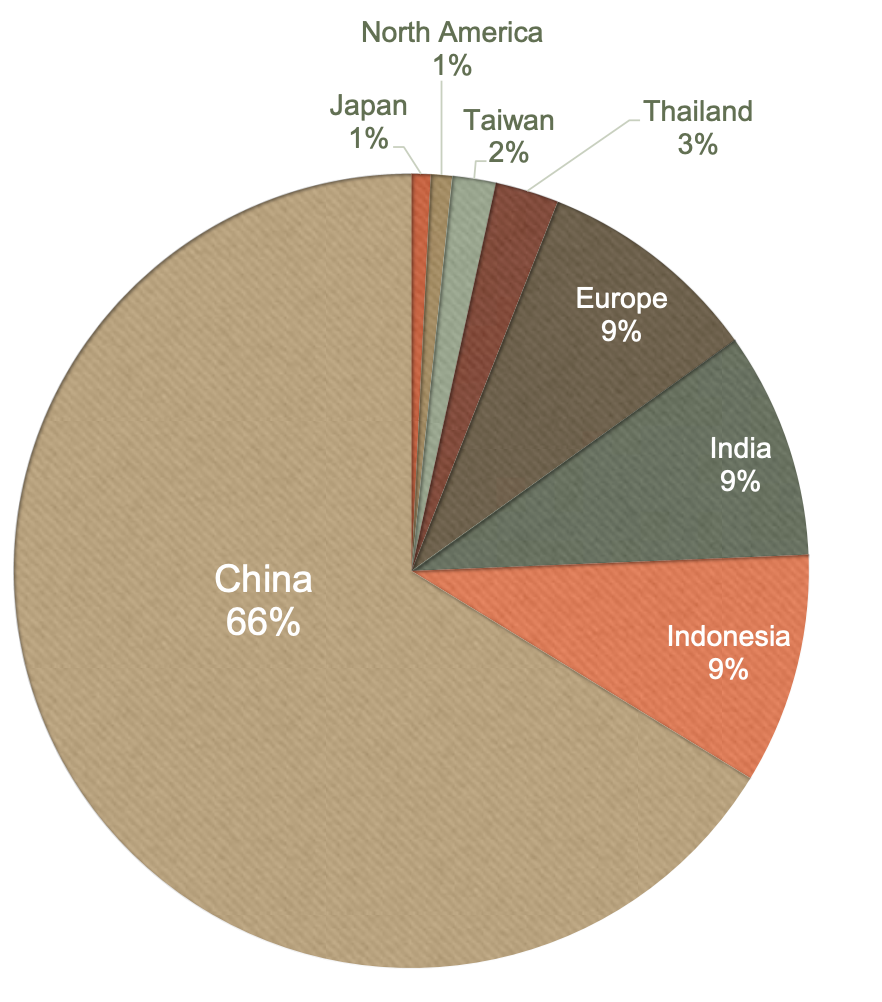
Viscose production in 2015

Viscose is marketed as a sustainable alternative to cotton polyester. As it is made from trees, it isn't inherently toxic to the environment. However, because of the mass amount of viscose needed for the growing fast fashion industry, it remains manufactured cheaply. Viscose is mainly manufactured in Southeast Asia, with China representing 66% of production in 2015. These manufacturers also dump untreated wastewater containing a multitude of chemicals; one major chemical is carbon disulphide, a solvent that is linked to severe medical conditions. Upon touch, it can burn through skin and cause severe eye damage. The wood pulp that viscose is made out of also raises high concerns for the environmental committee, as dissolving this material wastes 70% of a tree. This production has been linked to deforestation, specifically in the Indonesia rainforests.

==== Pesticides ====
Pesticides pose a major problem to crops, and cotton is among the most sprayed crops. Due to this heavy amount of chemicals, cotton production requires massive amounts of freshwater to wash it out.

In addition, most cotton that is grown is genetically modified to pests which lead to the problem of super weeds later on; these weeds need to be treated with even more pesticides, thus exacerbating harm to living organisms.

=== Overconsumption ===
Global consumption of apparel has risen to around 62 million tonnes per year. Due to the cheap production of clothes, they are worn only a few times before they are tossed, and nearly 85% of textiles end up in landfills every year. This is opposed to clothing that is made sustainably with better materials and thus can be worn for years and cycled through various owners.

For brands to keep up with current trends and thus continue competing in the fashion market, it is economically profitable for them to fulfill consumer demand with a constant cycle of overconsumption of goods. Especially in recent years, the time it takes for a trend to go out of style has decreased, leading to an increase in clothes being thrown out.

==== Carbon Emission ====
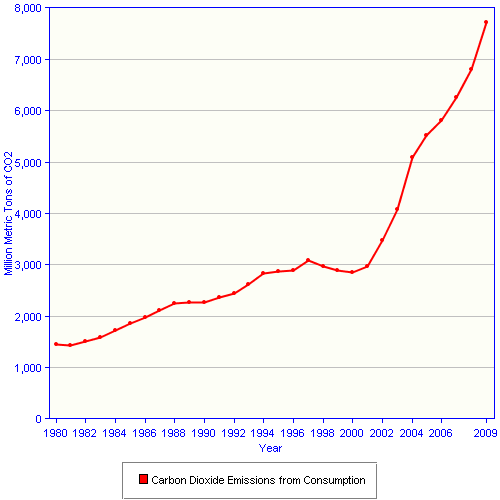
Carbon dioxide emissions due to consumption in China

Carbon dioxide emissions are a huge contributor to climate change, and China emits 13% of total emissions globally, estimating around 7.7 tons per person. China, however, participates in the Paris Agreement, a pledge for countries to achieve their peak emissions by 2030 and net-zero emissions before 2060. On estimation, if China were to continue emitting carbon dioxide levels at its current rate, they would use a lot of their carbon budget by 2050.

The fashion industry has been responsible for 10% of annual global carbon dioxide emissions. This figure is equivalent to the combined emissions of the entire economies of France, the United Kingdom, and Germany. This is partly attributable to the speed at which clothing from fast fashion brands is produced. These garments are manufactured in factories with few or no safety regulations, which produce clothing at a rapid pace. In 2018, the fashion industry was responsible for 2.1 billion metric tons of emissions.

In China, the highest emitter regions also happen to be the richest regions, such as Beijing and Shanghai; both these provinces are also the leading fashion hubs in China. Additionally, Beijing and Shanghai make up almost 50 million people.

=== Transportation ===
Since fashion brands use materials from all over the world and ship products out to a wide range of places, a lot of fast transportation is required. Transportation has accounted for roughly 15–20% of the total percent of emissions each year. This includes road transport, air freight, and ocean shipping. Of those three categories, air freight has a significantly larger impact with it producing 10 times as many emissions as road transport and 44 times as many as ocean shipping. Even though transport is a smaller share of emissions than production, it still contributes significantly and can grow as delivery speeds increase.

== Labor Concerns ==
=== Laborer Trafficking ===
China did not have labor laws until 1994, when it was established that workers could only work 44 hours a week with no more than 36 hours of overtime per month. However, these laws are regularly violated as many factories in China have shadow factories where workers are paid daily if they work overtime. These shadow factories are unknown to the government and are thus able to bypass rules.

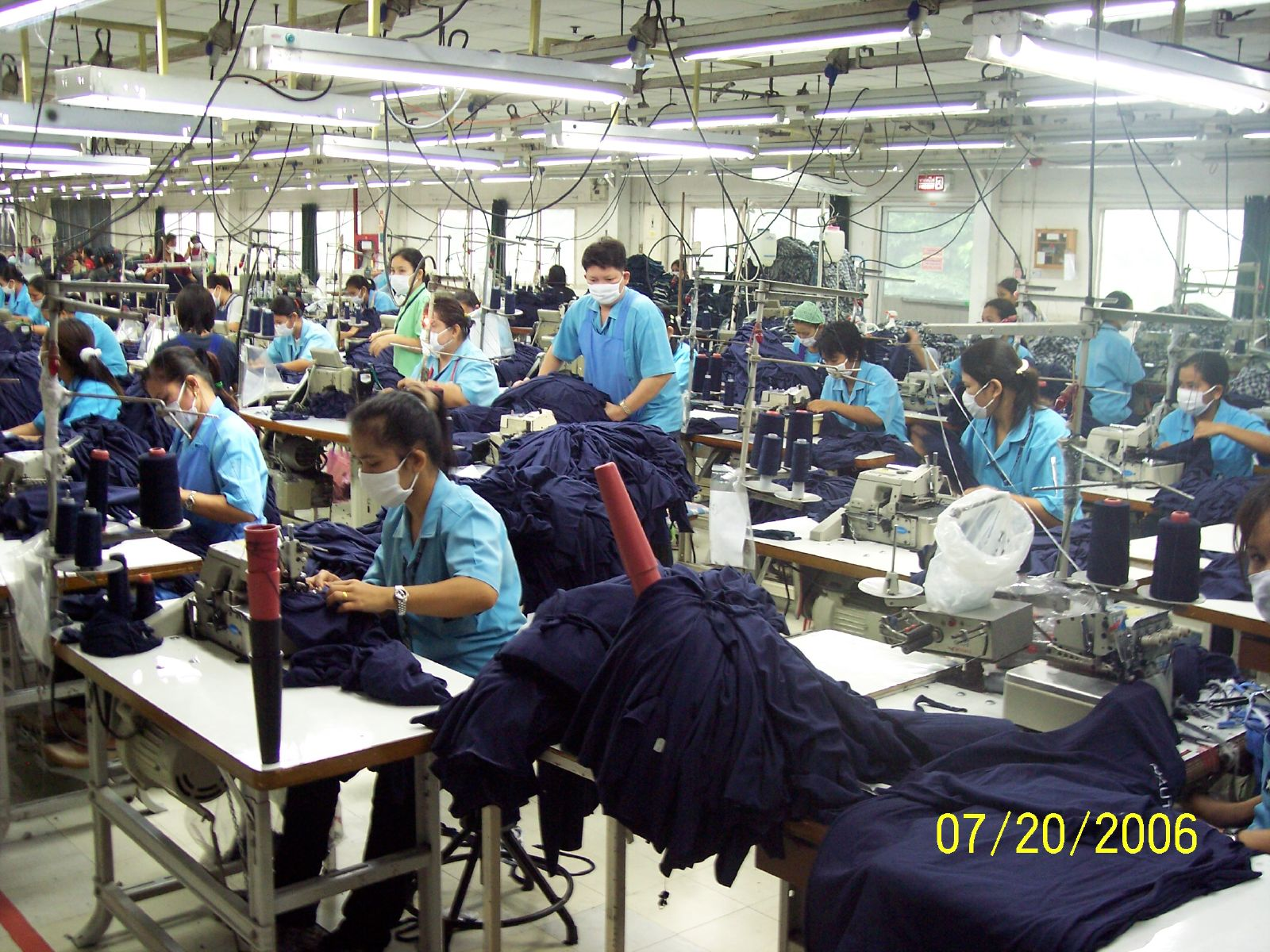
Thai garment sweatshop workers during work

Many factory workers' lives end in premature death due to their prolonged exposure to not only dangerous chemicals but also other health issues that come with being overworked. In 2008, more than 200 million workers in 16 million companies were exposed to harmful chemicals that led to conditions such as black lung and silicosis. However, workers are not the only ones exposed to these chemicals; consumers are too. Dermal absorption, a natural body process that allows the skin to absorb over 50% of chemicals, is an additional consequence of these products.

=== Uyghur Forced Labor ===
Uyghurs are predominately Muslim people found in Xinjiang. Xinjiang has imprisoned over 1 million Muslims in re-education camps, and the rest are subjected to everyday surveillance. Since 2014, Uyghurs have long faced discrimination for their Islamic beliefs. General Secretary of the Chinese Communist Party Xi Jinping, too, has destroyed many mosques and ruined many neighborhoods that house predominately Uyghur people.

Concerning fast fashion in Xinjiang, as many as one in five cotton products are products of human rights violations. Some of the world's biggest fast fashion brands are complicit with the human right's violations done on the Uyghurs; up to 1.8 million Uyghur and other Muslim people are forced into working for sweatshop factories. Since China is the number one producer of cotton, countless pieces of clothing have required forced, unethical labor.

In 2021, U.S. President Joe Biden signed into agreement the Uyghur Forced Labor Prevention Act that ensures products that are produced with forced labor are not allowed to be exported to the United States. However, the Chinese government has found ways around it.

== Sustainable Development Goals ==
The Sustainable Development Goals, adopted on 25 September 2015 as a part of the 2030 Agenda.

In 2017, the United Nations' member states came together to create 17 sustainable development goals to be achieved by 2030. These include reducing poverty, gender inequality, and climate change.

Goal 13 outlines steps for climate action. As the fashion industry uses mass amounts of fossil fuels to produce their garments, in order to reduce the warming of the planet, brands have implemented steps to achieve this SDG.

Goal 14 speaks on ways to improve the quality of water. Wastewater treatments are planned to be 65% to 90% effective at filtering out microfibers. It's estimated that the textile industry produces 0.12 million metric tons of microfibers per year.

One approach to improving sustainability in fast fashion industry it adopting a circular ecooomy model, which focuses on reducing textile waste by extending the lifespan of clothing through repair, reuse, resale, rental, and recycling. These practices support the United Nations' Sustainable Development Goal 12, which promotes responsible consumption and production.

== See also ==
- Textile industry in China
- Chinese clothing
