= Everlane =

American clothing retailer

Everlane, Inc.
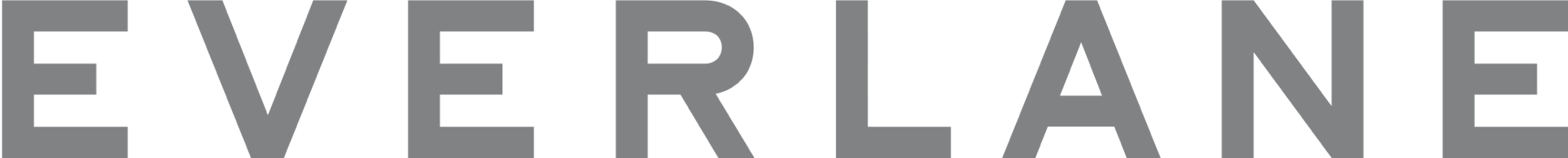

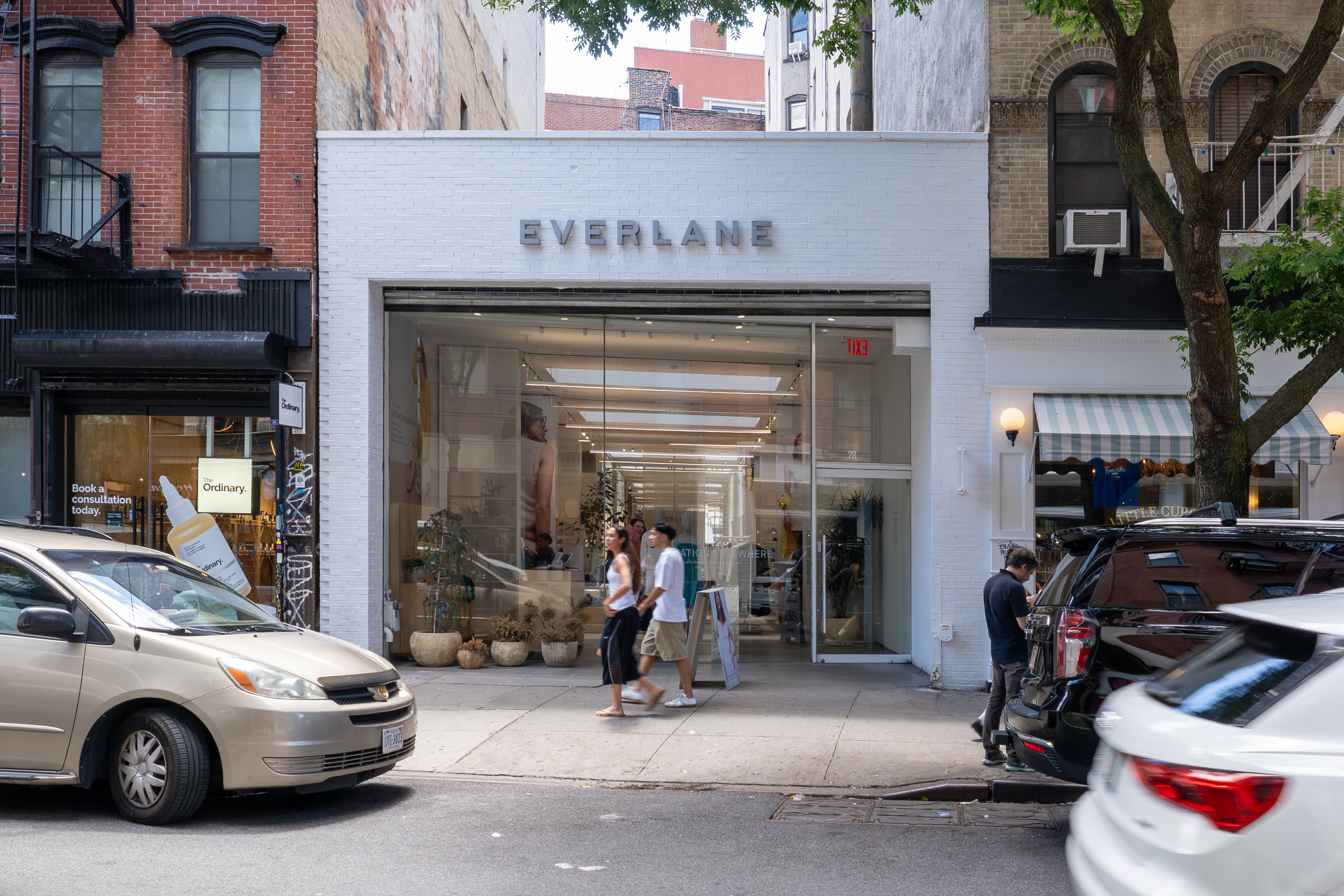
- Storefront in New York City
- Type: Subsidiary
- Industry: Retail
- Founded: 2010; 16 years ago
- Founders: Michael Preysman; Jesse Farmer
- Headquarters: 2170 Folsom Street, San Francisco, California, United States
- Area served: United States and Canada
- Key people: Alfred Chang (CEO); Rebekka Bay (head of product and design)
- Revenue: $40 million (2017)
- Parent: L Catterton (2024–2026); Shein (2026–present)
- Website: everlane.com

Everlane is an American clothing retailer that sells primarily online. The company was founded in 2010 by Michael Preysman and Jesse Farmer with the mission of selling clothing with transparent pricing. Everlane is headquartered in San Francisco, California, with stores in New York City, Washington, D.C., Boston, Los Angeles, Austin, and Palo Alto. Shein, a Chinese-owned fast fashion retailer, acquired Everlane for $100 million in May 2026.

== History ==
=== 2010–2020: Founding and growth ===
Everlane was founded in 2010 by Michael Preysman and Jesse Farmer as a direct-to-consumer online menswear retailer. The company enabled customers to see how much each item cost to produce and how big the company's markup for items was. The company opened brick-and-mortar stores in SoHo in New York City in 2017 and in San Francisco in 2018.

=== 2020–present: Decline and sale to Shein ===
In July 2020, The New York Times released a report with former employees accusing the company of hypocrisy, including anti-black behavior, union busting, and the company's public image not reflecting the company's internal culture. Former employees formed a collective called the "Ex-Wives Club" and released a public document on Google Docs detailing their experiences with anti-black behavior within Everlane. Preysman apologized to his workers but noted "we have no idea how to have a conversation with each other about it."

By the end of 2020, Preysman sold his shares to private equity firm L Catterton, giving that firm a minority stake. Preysman stepped down as chief executive in January 2022, but remained as executive chairman until 2025. In 2024, L Catterton became a majority owner. Under L Catterton, Everlane attempted to position itself as a more premium retailer. By March 2026, L Catterton began seeking investors for Everlane to address the company's roughly $90 million debt. By April 2026, Everlane announced its intent to move its headquarters from San Francisco to Los Angeles by August, reportedly due to a landlord dispute.

On May 17, 2026, Lauren Sherman at Puck reported that Everlane's board approved a deal to be acquired by Chinese fast fashion e-commerce platform Shein, valued at $100 million. Many media outlets highlighted the clashing of Everlane's sustainability mission in the background of Shein's ownership. Vogue called the acquisition "a metaphor for the state of sustainable fashion in 2026" and added that "[the] acquisition could paint a bleak picture for the future of sustainable fashion." The Atlantic said Shein "seems antithetical to the values [Everlane] once said it held." In The New York Times, fashion reporter Jacob Gallagher noted that the "shopping sustainably" crowd today buys used clothes which is considered more eco-conscious and unique, driven more by personal style than "adopting a virtue-signaling uniform." Gallagher also added people seem to care more about getting a good deal, over where their clothes came from.

== Products and sales ==
On its website Everlane attempted to educate customers about its supply chain, factories, employees, and the price breakdown of each product.

In 2018, the company pledged to stop using virgin plastic by 2021, including in packaging and in clothing made of synthetic fibers. On October 24, 2018, Everlane launched ReNew, a line of outerwear crafted from materials that were created out of three million recycled plastic bottles. The company planned to accomplish their goal by redeveloping the fabrics, yarns, and all raw materials that contained synthetic fibres into recycled components by 2021. In May 2019, Everlane released the DayGlove ReKnit, a shoe made entirely of recycled plastic bottles.

Everlane hired Icelandic singer Laufey as its Fall 2025 brand ambassador. Laufey and Everlane collaborated on a limited-edition capsule collection.

== Anti-union activity ==
In late December 2019, Everlane employees (most of them in the Customer Experience department) attempted to form a union under the auspices of the Communications Workers of America (CWA). In March 2020 union members asked to be officially recognized by the company. On March 27, 2020, the union group's Twitter account (@EverlaneU) tweeted:

Nearly every member of our team was just laid off. Retail workers from Everlane stores are being trained to replace us to answer your support emails. We are devastated beyond measure.

Forty-two out of 57 of the remote customer experience department had been laid off in addition to 180 part-time retail employees, while 68 full-time retail employees were informed they were furloughed. The layoffs were apparently surprising as employees had reportedly been reassured that business was strong. Everlane has since been receiving backlash, most notably from Senator Bernie Sanders, who wrote on his Twitter account: "Using this health and economic crisis to union bust is morally unacceptable."

== Awards and honors ==
In 2015, founder Michael Preysman was included in Forbes' 30 Under 30 for his work on the firm in "reinventing retail and E-Commerce." He has also been included in the BoF 500, an index of the people shaping the contemporary fashion industry.
