= Chris Xu =

Chris Xu may refer to:

- Chris Xu (table tennis) (born 1969), Chinese-born Canadian table tennis player
- Chris Jiashu Xu (born 1967), Chinese-born American real estate developer
- Chris Xu (entrepreneur), the founder of retail shipping company Shein
