= Jacob Gallagher =

Jacob Gallagher may refer to:

- Jacob Gallagher (Emmerdale)
- Jacob Gallagher (writer)
