= 2010 Asian Para Games closing ceremony =

The 2010 Asian Para Games closing ceremony was held at 8:00pm on 19 December in the Guangdong Olympic Stadium featuring Chinese cultural performances and fireworks. The 40-minute artistic performance was entitled "You Make the World Different" comprising three chapters, namely "Sky and Sea" (blue), "Leaf and Vein" (green), and "Light and Dream" (red), and was themed on the concepts of reunion and departure. It featured songs by local artists Cao Fujia, Huang Zheng, Xu Yang and Shi Peng and a performance by hundreds of children.

Among the highlights was as the cauldron flame was extinguished, the torch which ignited the cauldron during the opening ceremony was relit and passed down the man-made cliff below the cauldron by several disabled athletes forming the Chinese character for people "ren" (人). The flame was then carried in a rectangular lantern and handed over to Wan Qingliang, the mayor of Guangzhou. As the first Asian Para Games, the flame will be kept in Guangzhou forever. The torch and flag of the Guangzhou Asian Para games as well as the flag of the Asian Paralympic Committee were passed from Wan Qingling to Dato' Zainal Abu Zarin who passed it on to the President of South Korea Paralympic Committee for the 2014 Games. All future games closing ceremonies will involve delegations passing the torch and flag of the Guangzhou Games.

The closing ceremony was attended by President of Asian Paralympic Committee Dato' Zainal Abu Zarin and State Councilor of the People's Republic of China Liu Yandong. Wang Xinxian, President of Chinese Paralympic Committee, said, "We can say proudly that the Guangzhou 2010 Asian Para Games were a complete success under the theme, "We Cheer, We Share, We Win". We are confident that the Asian Para Games flame with the value of humanitarianism will forever light the way of human progress and a better tomorrow." Dato' Zainal Abu Zarin described the games as "the best Games for [disabled] athletes ever staged in Asia so far". The ceremony was watched by a 60,000 capacity-stadium crowd. The games were officially closed by Abu Zarin.
