= Smart Agriculture Competition =

- Industry: Agriculture
- Genre: Annual Agricultural Competition
- Founded: 2020
- Headquarters: Yunnan, China
- Area served: China
- Services: Agricultural productivity IoT; AI
- Parent: Pinduoduo
- Website: smartagricompetition.com/en

Smart Agriculture Competition is an annual greenhouse challenge and agricultural productivity competition launched by the largest agriculture technology platform Pinduoduo to encourage the use of data-driven tools to improve agricultural productivity and environmental sustainability.

The competition has the support of The Food and Agriculture Organization of the United Nations (FAO) and Wageningen University & Research (WUR), which are providing technical guidance. It is co-organized by China Agricultural University and Zhejiang University.

== Foundation ==
Agriculture-focused technology platform Pinduoduo hosted the inaugural competition in 2020, which attracted hundreds of young digital agricultural scientists from over 10 countries as well as many top growers in China to cultivate strawberries using artificial intelligence technology in greenhouses. The competition was judged by experts from countries including the Netherlands, Denmark, Spain, Italy and China.

According to The Food and Agriculture Organization (FAO), "In 2020's inaugural competition, the four technology teams employed data analysis, intelligent sensors and greenhouse automation to grow strawberries, and its output weight was 196% higher than that of the traditional farmers' team on average. They also outperformed the traditional teams in terms of cost effectiveness by an average of 75.5%. Two of the technology teams have started to commercialize their technology after the competition, resulting in real-life gains in productivity for local farmers."

In 2020's inaugural competition CyberFarmer-HortiGraph, announced as the winners of the inaugural Pinduoduo Smart Agriculture Competition-2020. It was reported that the "CyberFarmer-HortiGraph team outperformed traditional farmers by using algorithms and state-of-art greenhouse technology to remotely grow the best strawberry crops with the highest economic benefit".

== Current competition 2021 ==
In August 2021, The Smart Agriculture Competition-2021 was announced. Four finalist teams TomaGrow, HortiAI, CyberTomato, Hamato have been selected from 15 international teams for the final round of the Smart Agriculture Competition taking place at Pinduoduo's smart greenhouse base. The teams have to grow tomatoes within six months using various technologies such as nutritional modeling, growing environment control, and algorithmic controls to produce high-quality, nutritious, and high-yield tomatoes through green and sustainable practices. The teams must also demonstrate the commercial viability of their solutions.

Among the teams that took part in the competition is one from the University of Southern Denmark. The competition is an opportunity for the Danish agricultural community to learn more about China and contribute to its agricultural modernization drive, according to Thomas Hansen, the Danish Attache for Higher Education, Science, and Innovation to China. A multi-discipline team from Wageningen University & Research, the "knowledge heart" of Dutch greenhouse horticulture, offered training to the top teams and participated in knowledge-sharing sessions.

== Technical supporting partners ==
- The Food and Agriculture Organization of the United Nations
- Wageningen University & Research
- The Yunnan Academy of Agricultural Sciences
- Bayer Crop Science
- Ridder Group
