= The Starry Night Foundation =

Non-profit charitable trust

Starry Night Foundation
- Company type: Non-profit organization
- Founded: July 2020

The Starry Night Foundation is an international non-profit charitable trust in the field of scientific and medical research set up by entrepreneur Colin Huang and the founding team of Pinduoduo. The foundation is overseen by independent trustees.

== Foundation ==
Starry Night Foundation was launched in July 2020. According to Bloomberg, Huang and the Pinduoduo founding team donated 2.37% of Pinduoduo shares to the irrevocable trust to support fundamental research in biomedical science, agriculture and food.

In March 2021, it was announced that the Starry Night Foundation will be setting up a management council and academic committee for one of Starry Night’s science funds. The Starry Night Foundation committee has on board Professor Michael Levitt, who was awarded the Nobel Prize in Chemistry in 2013, and Professor Raoul Bino of Wageningen University & Research.
