= Temu =

Chinese online marketplace

- Website type: Online shopping
- Founded: July 2022; 4 years ago
- Area served: More than 90 markets (as of April 2025)
- Founders: Chen Lei, Colin Huang, Zhao Jiazhen
- Industry: E-commerce
- Parent: PDD Holdings
- Website: Official website
- Launched: September 2022; 4 years ago

Temu (/ˈtɛmuː/ TEM-oo, also /ˈtiːmuː/ TEE-moo; originally short for "Team Up, Price Down") is a Chinese-owned online marketplace operated by e-commerce company PDD Holdings, which was founded by Chen Lei, Colin Huang, and Zhao Jiazhen. It offers heavily discounted consumer goods, mostly shipped to consumers directly from China. By April 2025, the platform had expanded its operations to more than 90 markets.

In March 2024, Temu launched its Local Seller Program in the United States. As of July 2025, the program was operational in the UK, France, Italy, Japan, Mexico, and Australia, among other countries. The program is designed to avoid tariffs in the USA and other countries.

Temu's business model has allowed it to become popular among consumers, but has also drawn concerns over data privacy, forced labor, intellectual property, and the low quality of its marketplace products. The company has been embroiled in legal disputes with Shein, a direct competitor. The rise of Temu is one of Amazon's biggest challenges in years. A 2023 report by the U.S. House Select Committee on Strategic Competition found an "extremely high risk" of forced labor in the company's supply chains and accused it of exploiting the U.S. de minimis trade loophole to evade customs enforcement. The platform has faced multiple class action lawsuits over data privacy practices, investigations by South Korean and European regulators over toxic substances in products and breaches of the Digital Services Act, and criticism from consumer groups over product quality and safety. In the UK, the Advertising Standards Authority banned several Temu ads for sexualizing a child and objectifying women. The company has also been involved in an ongoing legal dispute with rival Shein over copyright infringement and antitrust allegations, with a UK trial expected in late 2026.

On October 17, 2022, Temu emerged as the most-downloaded U.S. shopping app. According to Sensor Tower, it was the most downloaded mobile app in any category in the U.S. between November 1 and December 14, 2022. According to Similarweb, as of September 2024, it became the second most-visited online shopping site in the world. As of December of the same year, the number of monthly active users of Temu's global smartphone app surpassed that of Amazon. In 2024, it was the most downloaded iPhone app in over 20 countries.

== Products ==
The products on Temu are available in over 600 categories, such as clothing, jewelry, pet supplies, and home and garden, among others. Its products are sold at competitive prices.

== History ==
Available territory map which Temu offers its services: Main countries with dedicated service and support. Countries with service restrictions, but with access for purchase and delivery. Regions/countries which services are unavailable. China, country of origin.

Temu is owned and operated by PDD Holdings, a multinational commerce group registered in the Cayman Islands with Dublin also listed as its principal office address. PDD Holdings also owns Pinduoduo, a popular online commerce platform in China. In the U.S., Temu is under the ownership of Whaleco, Inc., a subsidiary of PDD Holdings registered in the states of Delaware and Massachusetts.

The Temu platform first went live in the United States in September 2022, and ran ads during the February 2023 Super Bowl. In March 2023, Temu launched in Australia and New Zealand. In the following month, Temu launched in France, Germany, Italy, the Netherlands, Spain, and the UK. Temu eventually expanded into the Latin American market. On January 17, 2024, Temu officially launched in South Africa, the 49th country that Temu had entered since its launch. As of the same month, U.S. MAUs on the app reached more than 51 million.

In February 2024, Temu offered US$15 million in giveaways in multiple Super Bowl ads that several congressmen had asked the CBS network not to run. As a result of the ads, the company saw a spike in searches for their name and traffic, reaching 100 million active users in the U.S., over 130 million app downloads globally, and approximately 420 million monthly website visits, as per Semrush. Research by Sensor Tower estimated that in the last quarter of 2023 Temu users spent an average of 23 minutes a week on the app, compared with 18 minutes on Amazon and 22 minutes on eBay.

As of March 2024, Temu served approximately 30 million daily users in America. By August, the number of users of the Temu app had reached 91% of that of Amazon. As of December of the same year, Temu.com saw nearly 700 million monthly visits.

In 2024, Temu introduced the Local Seller Program, opening its marketplace to local sellers in numerous markets. This program enables sellers in these countries to list their products directly and fulfill domestic orders. Through this program, both small businesses and individual entrepreneurs in America can connect directly with millions of customers.

Temu's appearance at the 2024 Super Bowl garnered significant exposure, which made it a household name for U.S. consumers.

In January 2025, International Post Corporation released the 2024 edition of the IPC Cross-Border E-Commerce Shopper Survey Report, which showed Temu overtaking AliExpress as the second most used e-retailer for cross-border sales in the world.

As of March 2025, Temu was one of the most widely used online shopping websites in America. In May, it entered into a partnership with the International AntiCounterfeiting Coalition. In July, the company joined the International Trademark Association and became a member of the Anti-Counterfeiting Committee of the Association.

== Business model ==
Temu allows China-based vendors to sell and ship directly to customers without having to rely on intermediate distributors in the destination country, making products more affordable. Some sellers have stated that Temu asked them to lower their prices, even to the point of selling items at a loss. Temu offers free goods to some users who successfully refer new users via affiliate codes, social media, and gamification. Temu also uses "family warehouses", fulfillment centers run out of personal residences, often those of overseas Chinese immigrants. Online purchases on Temu can be made using a web browser or through a dedicated mobile app. Temu uses large-scale online advertising campaigns on Facebook and Instagram.

Temu requires its sellers to offer their products at prices lower than those found on AliExpress. Items not meeting Temu's minimum sales requirements (30 pieces and $90 in 14 days) are removed from the platform.

Competition between Temu and Amazon has led each company to match the other's supply chain strategy in 2024, with Temu onboarding warehouses in the United States to shorten delivery time, sell larger items, and diversify away from de minimis shipping, and Amazon signing up sellers in China to ship products directly to buyers as an alternative to using its existing "Fulfillment By Amazon" warehouses.

Temu's rapid ascent presented challenges no different from those of other Chinese e-commerce companies like Alibaba and Pinduoduo. PDD's revenue surged 86% despite missing Q2 estimates, wiping $55B off its market cap as executives flagged rising competition requiring heavy merchant investments. PDD's lean model (34% operating margin, 17K staff) beats Alibaba's 15% and JD.com's 3%.PDD Holdings uses lean operations and social commerce to outpace competitors like Alibaba and JD.com. Group buying and viral sharing for customers through WeChat creates bulk discounts that turn customers into salespeople, a strategy ignored by others.PDD Holdings recently warned investors that earnings would decelerate in 2024, as the company dealt with legal issues and a competitive environment in North America.

In March 2024, Temu initiated its Local Seller Program, enabling local sellers to sell products and fulfill orders within their own regions. As of October 2025, the initiative was available in more than 30 countries.

In September 2024, the Biden administration announced that it would propose a new rule to close the $800 de minimis exception to import duties and institute additional information disclosure requirements. The plan raised concerns that small sellers could be hurt disproportionately compared to larger platforms such as Temu.

In October 2024, Indonesia asked Apple and Google to block Temu from their app stores to protect small businesses in the country. In November 2024, Vietnam stated that Temu had not been authorized to do business in the country and suspended it the following month.

In May 2025, following US President Donald Trump's closure of the US de minimis exception as part of his sweeping tariff policy, Temu said it would stop selling goods from China directly to US customers. US orders would be "handled by locally based sellers, with orders fulfilled from within the country." Chinese products that arrived on U.S. soil prior to May 2 are exempt from the measure.

== Criticism ==
=== Intellectual property concerns ===
Sellers on Temu face recurring accusations of infringing upon intellectual property rights. Multiple instances of design theft have also been reported.

=== Advertisements ===
In 2023, five Temu ads were banned by the Advertising Standards Authority (ASA) in the UK for showing a bikini-wearing girl estimated to be aged eight to eleven in a pose that was "quite adult for her age," jockstraps that emphasised "the outline of the genitalia", cycling shorts that "appeared as underwear" with cut-out bottoms, and pictures of dresses that left out the models' faces. Temu said the picture of the girl violated the company's policy and would not be shown again but disputed the other findings by the ASA, saying not showing models' faces was not meant to objectify women and that other retailers had similar photos.

Temu is facing two class action lawsuits in the U.S. over unsolicited texts to numbers on the National Do Not Call Registry that continued even after recipients replied "stop".

=== Consumer complaints ===
According to Andrew Chow writing for Time, in 2022 Temu customers experienced a rash of undelivered packages, product discrepancies due to false advertisements, and mysterious charges, as well as unresponsive customer service.

According to Sarah Perez, writing for TechCrunch in relation to Temu's advertising campaigns, "These ads appear to be working to boost Temu's installs. But dig into the app's reviews and you'll find similar complaints to Wish, including scammy listings, damaged and delayed deliveries, incorrect orders and lack of customer service."

In October 2022, the Boston branch of the Better Business Bureau opened a file on Temu; by the end of 2022, they had received 31 complaints from customers regarding the website's service. In January 2024 the company has a BBB rating of C+, though the company is not BBB accredited. By December 2025, that rating was raised to B−.

=== Product quality ===
Some merchants use Temu as a clearing house where they attempt to sell off low quality, expired, or outdated products.

In August 2024, Seoul authorities discovered that products sold by popular online retailers Shein, Temu, and AliExpress contained toxic substances far exceeding legal safety limits. Inspections revealed alarming levels of harmful chemicals, such as phthalates, formaldehyde, and lead, in various items like shoes, hats, toys and nail polish. These substances pose significant health risks, including reproductive harm, carcinogenic effects, and liver poisoning. In response, South Korean officials demanded the removal of these products from sale, while the companies involved initiated internal investigations to enhance their safety compliance measures.

In a separate investigation conducted by Toy Industries of Europe (TIE) in early 2024, none of the 19 toys purchased from Temu complied with EU safety regulations, with 18 posing significant risks to children. The toys failed to meet critical safety standards, leading to potential hazards such as choking, strangulation, and chemical exposure. TIE highlighted the ongoing issue of third-party sellers on non-EU platforms, like Temu, who bypass stringent EU safety laws. This prompted calls for stricter enforcement and revision of the Toy Safety Regulation to close legal loopholes and ensure better protection for consumers.

In March 2024, BabyCenter did a review of the app Temu and said that the website had found products that have been recalled, could be counterfeit or circumvent U.S. safety standards and features that are important in preventing issues like choking.

=== Digital Services Act ===
In May 2024, the European Consumer Organisation launched a complaint against Temu with the European Commission alleging breaches of the Digital Services Act concerning trader traceability requirements and algorithmic transparency and accountability. In October 2024, the European Commission launched an investigation against Temu amid concerns over the sale of illegal and counterfeit products on the platform, the reappearance of previously banned sellers, and the app's addictive design. In July 2025, the European Commission stated that Temu was breaking EU rules by failing to prevent the sale of illegal products.

=== Data privacy ===
In May 2023, the United States–China Economic and Security Review Commission raised concerns about risks to users' personal data on Temu after Pinduoduo, its sister app in China, was suspended from Google Play because some of its versions, not available on Google's app store, were found to contain malware. Two days after releasing an update to remove the exploits, Pinduoduo disbanded the team of engineers and product managers who had developed them. According to a CNN source, most of the team were transferred to Temu, working in various departments, but a core group of engineers remained at Pinduoduo.

On May 17, 2023, Greg Gianforte, the governor of the US state of Montana banned Temu on government devices state-wide, along with ByteDance applications (including TikTok), WeChat, and Telegram.

According to Politico, "Apple said the company previously violated the company's mandatory privacy rules and misled people about how it uses their data."

Separate class action lawsuits were filed against Temu in 2023, located in Illinois and New York, each in regards to Temu's handling of private data collected via accounts made on their platform.

In February 2024, South Korea's Personal Information Protection Commission launched an investigation into Temu and other e-commerce platforms regarding the handling of user data. In June 2024, the Arkansas Attorney General filed a lawsuit against Temu alleging malware and deceptive trade practices. A similar lawsuit was filed by the Nebraska Attorney General in June 2025.

In December 2025, Arizona attorney general Kris Mayes sued Temu for consumer data theft and selling counterfeit brands. In January 2026, Texas governor Greg Abbott prohibited state employees from using Temu on all government devices and networks.

=== Forced labor concerns ===
In June 2023, the United States House Select Committee on Strategic Competition between the United States and the Chinese Communist Party stated that Temu did not maintain "even the façade of a meaningful compliance program" with the Uyghur Forced Labor Prevention Act to keep goods made by forced labor off its platform. The committee's report delivered a critical evaluation of Temu, suggesting that there was an "extremely high risk of forced labor contamination within Temu's supply chains." The report also found that Temu had exploited United States de minimis rules to evade customs enforcement. In 2024, Temu faced renewed criticism referring to the 2023 report from US Senator Tom Cotton, and US House representatives Kat Cammack and Michelle Steel after the company aired commercials during Super Bowl LVIII. In August 2024, over 20 U.S. state attorneys general requested information from Temu on its labor conditions, compliance with the Uyghur Forced Labor Prevention Act, and alleged connections with the Chinese Communist Party.

=== Fake postage labels ===
In 2025, sellers on Temu have faced accusations of using fake U.S. postage labels in an effort to dupe the United States Postal Service into delivering packages for free.

=== Anti-trust investigation ===
In October 2025, Germany's Federal Cartel Office launched an anti-trust investigation into Temu's operations in the country concerning merchant pricing.

=== Work concerns ===
Temu has been criticized for having an intense workplace culture and encouraging a 996 working hour system. This workplace culture has been connected to incidents of PDD Holdings employee deaths that have made international headlines.

In 2024, the Financial Times and The Wall Street Journal reported that Pinduoduo sued several former employees for violating non-compete clauses. The evidence Pinduoduo submitted to court includes video recordings of the former employees going to work for Pinduoduo's rivals. The company said it had obtained the evidence legally.

=== Lawsuits with Shein ===
In December 2022, Temu was sued by rival company Shein, accusing Temu of enlisting online influencers "to make false and deceptive statements" about Shein to promote its own goods. Temu later sued Shein in July 2023, alleging Shein "engaged in a campaign of threats, intimidation, false assertions of infringement, and attempts to impose baseless punitive fines" on clothing manufacturers thought to be working with Temu. On July 31, 2023, Shein won a temporary restraining order against Temu in a different case, alleging that the company used Shein's copyrighted images in product listings. Later in August, Shein sought an injunction against Temu, filed in London's High Court, alleging the company had "identified thousands of instances" where Temu's sellers copied its listing photos. Shein requested all violating posts be taken down and at least £100,000 in damages.

On July 18, 2023, Temu filed a federal lawsuit, accusing Shein of violating U.S. antitrust laws. Temu stated in the indictment that as of 2022, Shein owns more than 75% of the U.S. ultra-fast fashion market and leverages its market dominance to compel exclusive agreements with apparel manufacturers, restricting them from collaborating with Temu. Temu further contended that in May 2023, Shein mandated that its 8,338 manufacturers supplying or selling on their platform sign exclusive distribution agreements, preventing them from offering their products on the Temu platform or to Temu-affiliated sellers. Temu contends that these manufacturers linked to Shein constitute a substantial portion, estimated at 70% to 80%, of all merchants offering ultra-fast fashion products in the U.S., leading to higher prices, fewer consumer options, and hindered growth of the U.S. ultra-fast fashion market.

In October 2023, Shein and Temu requested that their respective cases against each other be dismissed without prejudice in Massachusetts and Illinois. Neither company offered further explanation or whether a settlement had been made.

In December 2023, Temu sued Shein again, accusing illegal interference with its suppliers.

In February 2024, Temu issued a counterclaim in the London High Court, accusing Shein of breaking British competition law by tying suppliers of fast-fashion products to exclusive agreements, a claim it values at 4.2 million pounds ($5.5 million) and which Shein denies. Temu also alleged that Shein "bullied, intimidated, and even detained" suppliers in China as part of a campaign of "mafia-style intimidation". Their cases at London's High Court are expected to come to trial towards the end of 2026.

In August 2024, Shein filed a copyright infringement lawsuit against Temu in U.S. federal court.

=== Tax avoidance ===
In October 2025, Temu attracted criticism for its "negligible" economic and tax footprint across Europe and the UK.

=== Subsidies investigation ===
In December 2025, the European headquarters of Temu in Ireland were raided by authorities as part of a foreign subsidy investigation. The European Commission charged Temu with failing to cooperate with the investigation.

=== EU fine ===
In May 2026, the EU fined Temu 200 million euros for allowing the sale of products illegal in the EU, including unsafe baby toys and defective electronics chargers.

== See also ==
- List of online marketplaces
