= SHEGLAM =

Cosmetics brand

- Type: Private
- Industry: Cosmetics
- Founded: 2019
- Founder: Sylvia Fu
- Headquarters: Singapore
- Area served: Global
- Products: Makeup, Skincare
- Parent: SHEIN
- Website: SHEGLAM

SHEGLAM is a cosmetics brand that was launched in 2019 by the e-commerce company SHEIN, Founded in Singapore, SHEGLAM uses direct-to-consumer business model. The brand markets to young consumers via social media platforms such as Instagram, TikTok, and YouTube, where influencers promote its products.

== Products ==
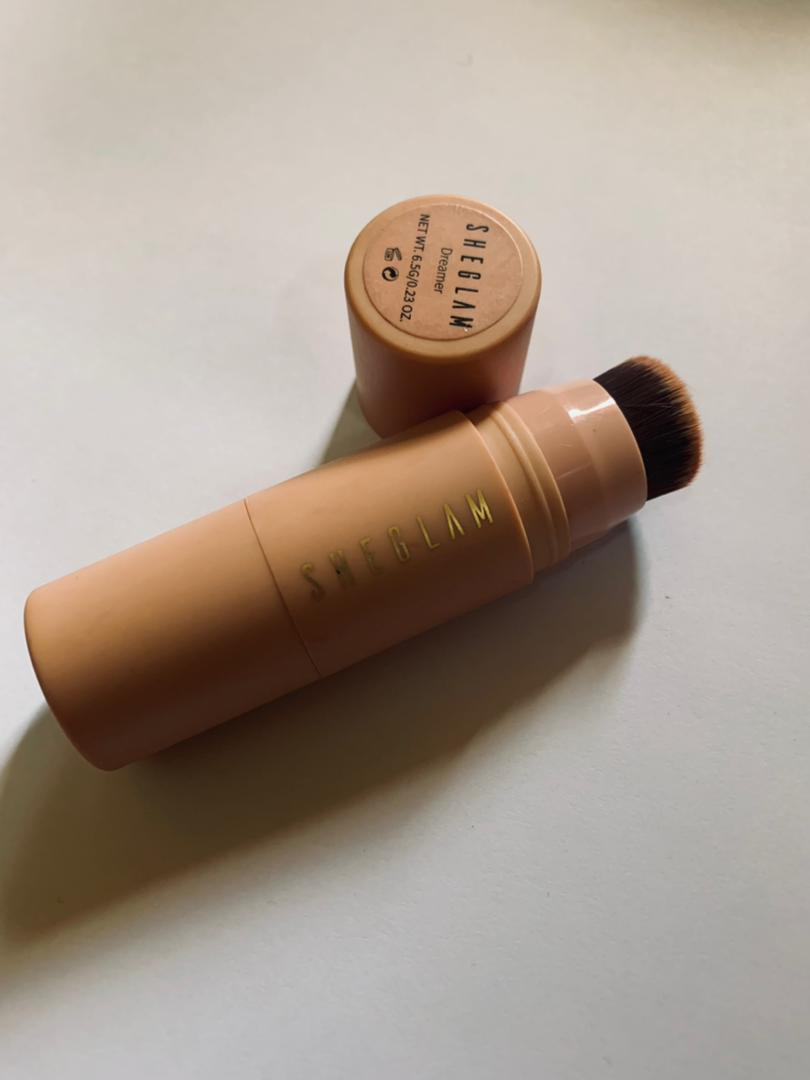
One of Sheglam's products

SHEGLAM offers a range of cosmetics, including foundations, eyeshadows, lipsticks, and skincare products.. The brand is Leaping Bunny certified and its products are cruelty-free

Its catalog includes:

- Face: foundations, concealers, primers, blushes, bronzers, highlighters, setting powders, and setting sprays
- Eyes: eyeshadow palettes, eyeliners, mascaras, brow gels, and lashes
- Lips: lipsticks, lip liners, glosses, and liquid lipsticks
- Tools: makeup brushes, sponges, and other beauty tools

== Marketing and growth ==
SHEGLAM initially focused its marketing efforts on the US market, but by 2023 it had expanded to Europe, the Middle East and Australia.

SHEGLAM made its brick and mortar debut at the UAE's Mall of the Emirates in November 2023 at department store Centrepoint. As of June 2024 it had over 150 stores in the Gulf Cooperation Council (GCC).

In September 2022 the company held a joint promotion with the Harry Potter franchise, and in November 2022 held a pop-up event with American actress and singer Ashley Tisdale.

Also check out-

- Fenty Beauty
- Sephora
- Ulta Beauty
- Shein
- Lakme
