= Shein =

Multinational online clothing retailer

- Native name: 希音
- Formerly: ZZKKO
- Traded as: SEHK: 625
- Industry: Retail
- Founded: October 2008; 18 years ago in Nanjing, China
- Founder: Chris Xu
- Headquarters: 112 Robinson Road, Singapore
- Area served: Worldwide
- Key people: Chris Xu CEO); Leigh Gui (CFO)
- Revenue: ▲US$38 billion (2024)
- Operating income: ▼US$1 billion (2024)
- Number of employees: 16,000+ (2024)
- Parent: Roadget Business Pte. Ltd.
- Subsidiaries: MOTF; ROMWE; Everlane; Missguided; SHEGLAM
- Website: shein.com

Shein
- Chinese: 希音
Transcriptions
Standard Mandarin
- Hanyu Pinyin: Xīyīn
- Bopomofo: ㄒㄧ ㄧㄣ
- Wade–Giles: Hsi^{1}-yin^{1}
- Tongyong Pinyin: Si-yin
- IPA: [ɕí.ín]
Yue: Cantonese
- Jyutping: hei1 jam1

Shein (/ˈʃiːɪn/ SHEE-in; styled as SHEIN; Chinese: 希音; pinyin: Xīyīn) is a global e-commerce platform specializing in fast fashion. While the company primarily focuses on women's clothing, it also offers men's apparel, children's wear, accessories, cosmetics, shoes, bags, and other fashion items. Shein mainly focuses on Europe, Americas, Australia, and the Middle East along with other consumer markets worldwide.

Founded in Nanjing, China, in October 2008 as ZZKKO by entrepreneur Chris Xu, Shein grew to become the world's largest fashion retailer as of 2022. The company is currently headquartered in Singapore.

Known for selling relatively inexpensive apparel, Shein's success has been credited to its popularity among younger Millennial and older Generation Z consumers. The company was initially compared to a drop shipping business, as it was not involved in design and manufacturing, instead sourcing products from the wholesale clothing market in Guangzhou. Beginning in 2012, Shein began to establish its own supply chain system, transforming itself into a fully integrated retailer. The company has established its supply chain in Guangzhou with a network of more than 3,000 suppliers as of 2022. However, it has faced controversy due to the reports of Chinese sweatshops and child labor.

In 2022, the company moved its headquarters from China to Singapore for regulatory, international expansion, and financial reasons – while keeping its supply chains and warehouses in China. In 2023, Shein generated US$32 billion in revenue. Shein was valued at $100 billion after a funding round in April 2022. As of February 2025, it was valued at $30 billion.

According to Bloomberg Businessweek and others, Shein's business model has benefitted from the China–United States trade war, particularly with regard to customs tax advantages. In recent years, Shein has found itself in the middle of trademark disputes, lawsuits involving competitors, and product safety concerns, as well as accusations of tax evasion and being involved in labor law and human rights violations.

== History ==
=== 2008–2012: founding and early business model ===
Shein, originally named ZZKKO, was founded in China in 2008 by entrepreneur and search engine optimization (SEO) marketing specialist Chris Xu (Xu Yangtian). Information on Xu's educational and career background remains elusive as of 2022, with sources conflicting on details of his biography. According to The Guardian, some sources have described him as a Chinese-American who graduated from George Washington University (GWU). However, other sources indicate that Xu was born in 1984 in Shandong province, and was educated at Qingdao University of Science and Technology. The Guardian notes that Xu is depicted in Chinese media coverage as an average student of poor origins. Shein has insisted that Xu was born in China.

The website SheInside.com was registered in March 2011, advertising itself as "a worldwide leading wedding dress company", although it sold general womenswear as well. At the time, Shein had no involvement in the design or production of the garments; it functioned similarly to a drop shipping firm, which sells items from third-party wholesalers directly to international customers.

=== 2012–2019: rebranding and retailer status ===
Shein made their products available in Spain, France, Russia, Italy, and Germany in the early 2010s; in addition to selling women's clothing, the company sells cosmetics, shoes, purses, and jewelry. In 2012, the company established the current website and began using social media marketing by collaborating with fashion bloggers for giveaways and advertising items on Facebook, Instagram, and Pinterest.

In 2014, Shein acquired Romwe, a Chinese e-commerce retailer, making it a fully integrated retailer. By 2016, the company had 100 employees and had already established its headquarters in Guangzhou. The firm's name changed again in 2015 from Sheinside to Shein, claiming that it needed a name that was simpler to remember and easy to find online.

By 2016, Xu gathered a team of 800 designers and prototype makers that manufactured Shein-branded clothing. The company began improving its supply chain, excluding vendors that provided low-quality items or photos.

==== Registration in Singapore ====
In 2019, Singapore-registered Roadget Business Pte listed Chris Xu and others as representatives. By 2021, Chinese corporate filing shows that Shein de-registered its main business, Nanjing Top Plus Information Technology Co Ltd. Singapore filings reportedly shows Roadget as the legal entity operating Shein's global website and owns Shein's trademarks.

=== 2020–2023 ===
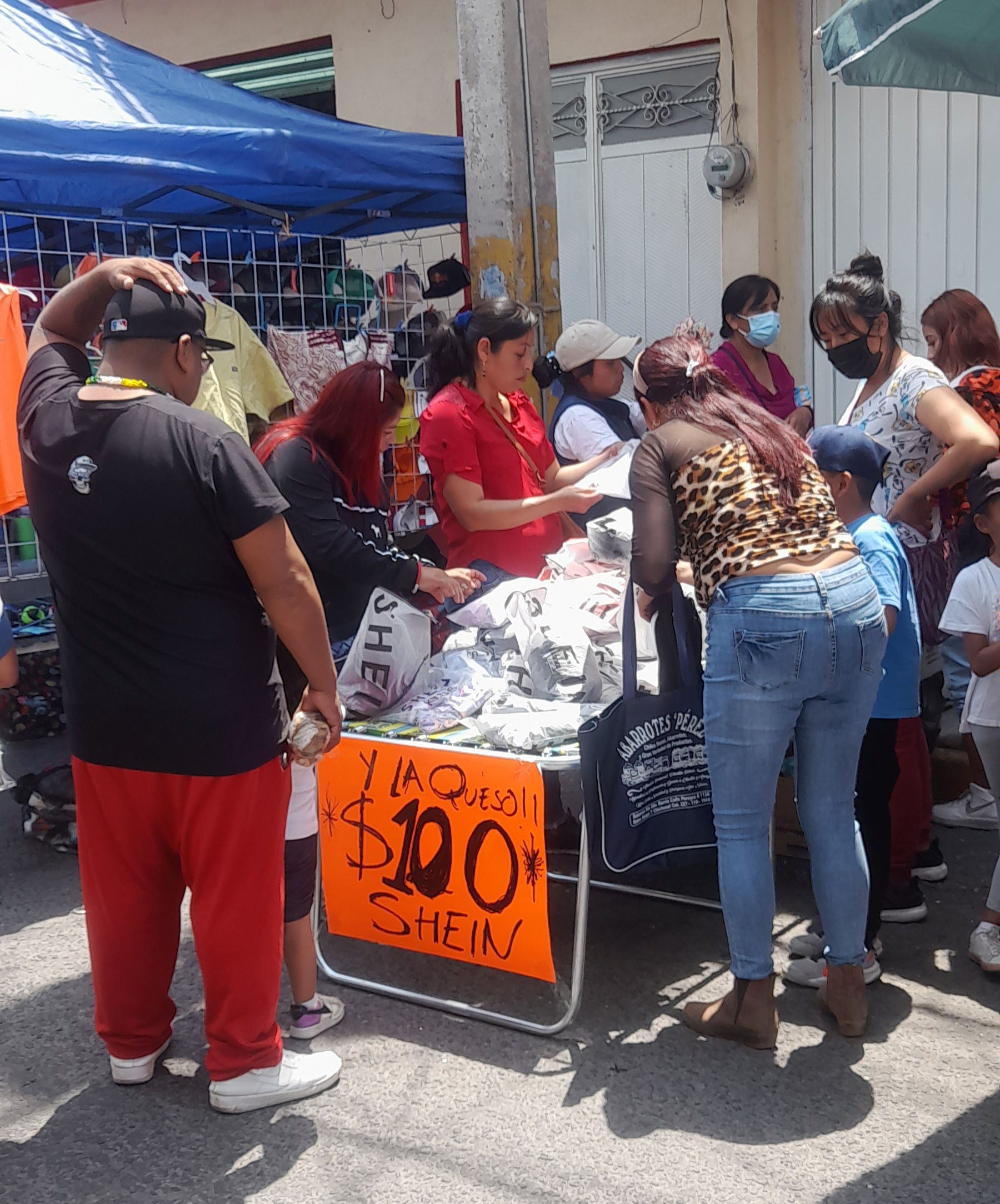
People shopping for clothes in Huejotzingo, Mexico, in 2023

Amid the COVID-19 pandemic in 2020, it reportedly made $10 billion in revenue, making it the seventh consecutive year of more than 100% sales growth for the company. As of October 2020, Shein was the world's largest online-only fashion firm. Shein was noted for being an early adopter of TikTok as a promotional tool, and the firm's ability to advertise viral items boosted its popularity. By November 2021, Shein grew from a company valued at $15 billion to one valued at $30 billion. According to Ernest Analytics, Shein became the largest fast fashion retailer in the United States in 2021, and had also launched online in Mexico. According to an investigation by Rest of World, Shein added anywhere between 2,000 and 10,000 individual styles to its app each day between July and December 2021. A survey of 7,000 American teenagers in 2022 ranked Shein as their second favorite e-commerce website. In early 2022, Shein moved its headquarters from China to Singapore.

In April 2022, Shein raised $1 billion to $2 billion in private funding and claimed 28% of the US fast fashion market. As of May 2022, it is the largest fast-fashion firm in the world. In a May 2022 article in Fortune, the company was described as catering to Generation Z consumers while using big data and rapid Chinese manufacturing to quickly design clothing at lower prices. The company was valued at $100 billion.

In October 2022, The Wall Street Journal reported that Shein generated US$24 billion in revenue in 2022, becoming almost as large as traditional fast fashion brands such as Zara and H&M. Its other competitors include ASOS, Fashion Nova, Forever 21, PrettyLittleThing, Temu, and Topshop. In August 2023, Shein and SPARC Group (the company that owns Forever 21) entered into a joint venture where each company acquired a minority stake of the other.

==== Expansion in North America and potential IPO ====
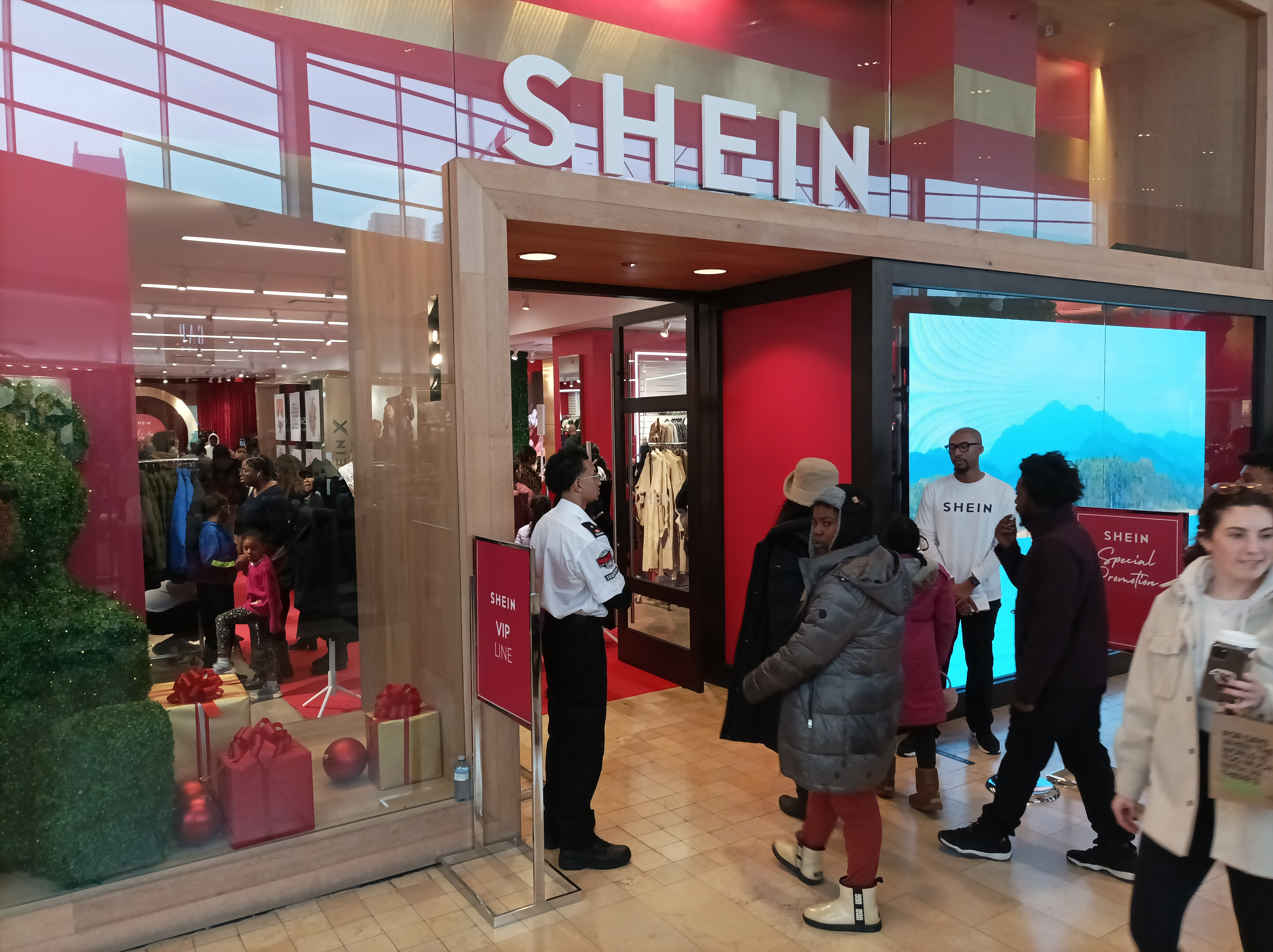
Shein pop-up store in Mississauga, Ontario, Canada, in 2023

Shein launched their marketplace, featuring third-party vendors, in Brazil and the United States in May 2022. In 2022, Shein established a distribution center in Whitestown, Indiana, with plans to open more distribution facilities in southern California and northeast US. In November 2022, Shein opened a new corporate office and distribution center in Markham, Ontario, to function as Shein's main distribution hub in Canada. Sales in 2022 were $23 billion.

In July 2023, Shein announced to investors it had seen its highest recorded profits for a first half of a year. The company had an estimated value of $66 billion, a drop from the estimated $100 billion in value in 2022, according to The Wall Street Journal. In February 2023, Marcelo Claure was appointed chair of the Latin American operations of Shein. According to reports, in 2023, although still domiciled in Singapore, Shein sourced primarily from manufacturers in China. In 2023, Shein had 100 factories in Brazil, and had outlined plans to increase that number to 2,000. In June 2023, the company faced an online backlash after international influencers toured and promoted its facilities in China.

In 2023, The Information reported that Shein representatives had informal discussions with U.S.-based tech giants Amazon and Google about a potential investment in the company. The report notes that the company was expected to debut on the New York Stock Exchange (NYSE) in the future. In August 2023 Shein received a temporary restraining order in the US against its competitive rival Temu on a trademark infringement case. They also were involved in US lawsuits against each other with accusations of monopolization. In June 2023, the company announced plans to open a warehouse in Mexico for a "bigger foothold" in Latin America. In December 2023, Temu sued Shein, alleging illegal interference with its suppliers.

In June 2024, Shein announced that it filed on the London Stock Exchange for an initial public offering, which generated criticism from human rights groups and policy researchers. In April 2025, the Financial Conduct Authority approved Shein's initial public offering prospectus. In April 2025, Bloomberg News reported that the Chinese government had blocked attempts by Shein to diversify its supply chain away from mainland China. Also in April, Shein raised the prices of its products for customers in the United States due to tariffs imposed by Donald Trump on goods imported from China, and in May 2025, Bloomberg News reported that Shein's IPO plans had stalled due to the effects of these tariffs. Shein also failed to secure the approval of the China Securities Regulatory Commission to list in London and is instead considering a listing in Hong Kong, according to The Guardian. Shein is reported to consider moving its headquarters back to China in order to sway the Chinese government to permit an IPO in Hong Kong.

In April 2025, President Trump announced that he would end the tariff loophole for low-cost packages, or what is also known as the de minimis exemption. The exemption allowed packages valued under $800 to enter the US without being subject to taxes. The president signed an executive order that ended the decades-old exemption for any package coming into the US from China or Hong Kong. This resulted in Shein and other companies like Alibaba and Temu announcing that they would have to raise prices for US customers starting April 25. Shein said it would seek to limit prices for customers. In addition to increased prices, the move will also make it longer for shipments of packages. In response, retailers like Alibaba, Shein, and Temu shifted more inventory to US warehouses, bulked shipments, and reduced advertising expenses while delivery times became longer and more complicated. Short-term negotiations did find a decrease in tariffs, but these were also temporary due to legal challenges. Many issues still remain unsettled, like pricing, sourcing, and fulfillment.

In May 2026, Shein agreed to acquire US clothing brand Everlane. The value of the deal was not disclosed by Shein or Everlane but reportedly valued the company at $100 million.

In August 2026, Shein filed to raise up to HK$13.86 billion (US$1.77 billion) through an initial public offering on the Hong Kong Stock Exchange. The company offered approximately 280 million Class B shares at HK$47.60 to HK$49.50 per share.

The offering went ahead at the end of August 2026 in a flotation which valued the company at $26.2 billion.

=== Lawsuits with Temu ===
In December 2022, Shein sued Temu alleging that Temu had enlisted online influencers "to make false and deceptive statements" about Shein to promote its own goods.

In August 2023, Shein sought an injunction against Temu, filed in London's High Court, alleging the company had "identified thousands of instances" where Temu's sellers copied its listing photos. Shein requested all violating posts be taken down and at least £100,000 in damages.

In February 2024, Temu hit back with a counterclaim in February, accusing Shein of breaking British competition law by tying suppliers of fast-fashion products to exclusive agreements, a claim it values at 4.2 million pounds ($5.5 million) and which Shein denies. Temu also alleged that Shein "bullied, intimidated, and even detained" suppliers in China as part of a campaign of "mafia-style intimidation". Their cases at London's High Court are expected to come to trial towards the end of 2026.

== Marketing ==
Shein is available through its website, and through dedicated mobile apps; it is distributed on the Google Play Store, App Store, Galaxy Store, and Huawei AppGallery. According to CNN, TikTok plays a large role in driving customers to the company website due to a TikTok trend of bulk buying clothes from Shein and presenting Shein clothes to their audience like a standard haul video. On May 17, 2021, the number of Shein's app downloads surpassed those of Amazon. Shein was the second most popular shopping app globally in 2021, and the most-downloaded app in May 2022.

Shein says it uses the psychology of the new generation and implements marketing strategies accordingly to achieve growth. In 2020, Shein was the most talked-about brand on TikTok and YouTube, and the 4th most talked-about brand on Instagram. Its low prices attract teenage internet shoppers with small budgets to post what they bought on social media.

For user growth, the company offers relatively low prices to stimulate demand. With more spending, customers can be rewarded with more discounts, which are encouraged to be applied to their next shopping trip. Shein not only makes use of its algorithm-driven recommendation system but also attracts customers to visit the platform frequently to do tasks, like adding items to their cart, watching live streams, conducting reviews of already purchased items and joining its contest show, to win points which can be redeemed later.

== Manufacturing ==
Originally, Shein did not design its clothes. The company mainly sourced its clothing from China's wholesale clothing market in Guangzhou. However, Shein became a fully integrated retailer in 2014 when it secured its supply chain system. Now, the company utilizes a network of manufacturing partners and suppliers to make and deliver its products.

Shein makes predictions on trends and produces items as quickly as three days after the identification of a trend. Shein also limits its orders to small batches of about 100 items to gauge customer interest. Order sizes are increased only if the small batches do well with consumers. In contrast, its competitors such as Zara order larger quantities (about 500), increasing their chances of losing profit if orders are not purchased in full. Bloomberg reported that Shein's small-batch ordering underpinned its growth, and that suppliers businesses expanded as Shein's scale increased.

== Lobbying ==
In 2022, Shein hired Akin Gump Strauss Hauer & Feld and Ben Quayle as lobbyists, according to U.S. federal lobbyist disclosures. According to Politico, Shein's lobbying campaign is geared toward rehabilitating its image in Washington.

== Tax treatment ==
Shein can avoid paying export and import taxes, contributing to larger margins. The U.S. legislative bill Section 321 in the Trade Facilitation and Trade Enforcement Act of 2015 (also referred to as "de minimis") states that any import up to $800 per person is duty-free. This bill has allowed Shein to deliver to the United States without paying taxes, allowing Shein to have a competitive advantage over domestic companies in the United States. In September 2024, the Biden administration announced that it would propose a new rule closing the $800 de minimis exception for Chinese e-commerce retailers such as Shein.

In April 2023, Brazilian officials stated that Shein used a loophole in Brazilian law to practice tax evasion and "smuggling" to consumers in the country.

=== Tax avoidance and evasion accusations ===
The United Kingdom requires foreign sellers shipping low-value consignments (under £135) to register for UK VAT, collect VAT from buyers on such shipments, and remit it to His Majesty's Revenue and Customs. It has been suggested that Shein failed to do so for at least 9 months after the requirement took effect, and its website does not display its UK corporate registration number or itemize VAT, as UK rules require.

In September 2025, The Guardian reported that the company had been accused of UK corporate tax avoidance by shifting profits to Singapore.

== Environmental impact ==
In 2023, Shein contributed 16.7 million total metric tons of carbon dioxide emitted into the air. The manufacturers’ rapid use of virgin polyester and large consumption of oil churns out the same amount of CO_{2} as approximately 180 coal-fired power plants. 76% of Shein's products use polyester, a fabric that easily sheds microplastics, and only 6% of those clothing items are recycled.

Deutsche Welle released a video in late 2021 detailing the ultra-fast-fashion system Shein is built on, criticizing the company's marketing to adolescents and young adults, as well as the caused environmental impact. Other media outlets have pointed at the addictive nature of the app, noting how its low prices encourage users to make impulse purchases. In 2023, Time magazine reported that the company was producing more than 6.3 million tons of carbon dioxide every year.

In response to criticism, Shein launched a resale service on its US app that enables the buying and selling of secondhand Shein fashion. Shein prices are highly affordable hence customers may choose to buy a new item rather than purchase a resale piece.

== Legal and regulatory issues ==
=== Unsafe chemical exposure ===
Shein was also cited in a Marketplace investigation overseen by professor Miriam Diamond at the University of Toronto for selling toddlers' jackets that contained almost 20 times the amount of lead permitted under Health Canada's safety regulations. The company also sold a red purse that contained five times the permitted amount of lead. Shein notified Marketplace that they would stop selling the two items and would stop getting supplies from the corresponding suppliers until the problem was addressed. In May 2024, South Korean authorities found that some of Shein products contained unsafe level of phthalates.

=== Labor law violations ===
Shein produces its clothing in Guangzhou. Often going overtime and lasting more than 10 hours, an employee's working hours are unpredictable, and some workers are paid as little as US$5/hour. Employees rent small rooms above the cloth and sewing machine-filled garment factories. They sleep on bunk beds and pay US$130 per month.

Because Shein produces 10,000 garments a day to maintain pace with fast-changing clothing trends, they do not stock up on inventory. Because about 60 percent of 18-year-olds are going to college, the amount of Chinese young people willing to work in clothing workshops has decreased, and there are fewer employees working in the Guangzhou workshops. There have been complaints from employees that their work is too taxing. During an investigation by Wired, Shein workers revealed that they often have to work 75-hour weeks in factories that lack sufficient windows or exits.

In 2021, a Public Eye investigation reported that employees of six Shein suppliers in Guangzhou were working 75 hours per week in breach of Chinese labor laws. Public Eye also discovered workshops with blocked corridors and stairways.

Channel 4's documentary, Inside The Shein Machine, sent undercover cameras to film factory workers who were forced to pull 17-hour shifts to make hundreds of garments a day. In one factory, they made a daily base salary of $20, which would then be docked by $14 if any garments had mistakes.

In 2024, Shein said it found two cases of child labour in its supply chain the prior year. Shein's general counsel for Europe, the Middle East and Africa, Yinan Zhu, disclosed the cases in a letter to MPs in the United Kingdom in 2025. One of the incidents involved a child aged 11 years and eight months.

Shein said it has built an in-house team to monitor supply-chain partners and engages with independent agencies such as Intertek to conduct regular and unannounced audits.

In 2025, Texas Attorney General Ken Paxton announced an investigation of Shein, citing unethical labor practices and the sale of unsafe consumer products.

=== ISO certification claim ===
In August 2021, Shein claimed on its website that its factories were certified by the International Organization for Standardization (ISO) and complied with standards set by "organizations like SA8000". While the ISO sets standards, it does not directly certify any company. SA8000 is not an organisation but a standard administered by Social Accountability International, which said Shein had received no such certification. The claim was removed after Reuters inquired the company about it.

=== Anti-modern slavery reporting ===
The United Kingdom's 2015 Modern Slavery Act requires companies over a certain size to make statements about how they are combatting modern slavery. A similar law has been passed in Australia. Shein declined to disclose its revenue to Reuters in 2021 but said it was in the process of preparing such statements.

In June 2023, Shein was included in a report by the United States House Select Committee on Strategic Competition between the United States and the Chinese Communist Party titled "Fast Fashion and the Uyghur Genocide".

=== European Commission investigation ===
In February 2025, the European Commission requested internal documents from Shein regarding risks linked to the presence of illegal goods on the marketplace as part of an existing investigation under the Digital Services Act. In May 2025, the European Commission alleged that Shein breached EU law.

=== Investigations by France ===
In November 2023, the French Ministry of Economics and Finance initiated an investigation into Shein to assess its compliance with international guidelines and French laws after the Socialist Party accused the company of not respecting human rights, the environment, and consumer interest. Shein said it would cooperate with the investigation. In November 2025, the French government moved to suspend the online platform of Shein until Shein could prove to authorities that it complies with local laws and regulations.

==== Childlike sex dolls ====
In November 2025, France's consumer watchdog reported that the company was selling sex dolls with a childlike appearance. They claimed there was "little doubt as to the child pornography nature of the content". Following media reports and protests in Paris, Shein banned the sale of sex dolls after French authorities threatened to shut down the site over its sale of sex dolls with child-like features. France announced it began proceedings to suspend the company's online website. This came an hour after Shein opened its first physical shop in the world on the sixth floor of Paris department store BHV. In February 2026, the European Commission opened a formal investigation into Shein over the issue.

=== Xinjiang cotton ===
In November 2022, Bloomberg News reported that Shein's apparel was made with cotton sourced from Xinjiang amid the persecution of Uyghurs in China. Following the report, a coalition of U.S. senators wrote to Shein to demand information about the potential use of forced labor in Xinjiang for cotton products.

Legal experts have noted that Shein may be able to avoid the repercussions of the Uyghur Forced Labor Prevention Act because most Shein parcels shipped to the U.S. are worth less than $800 (de minimis shipments), which means that inspection by customs may be waived.

In May 2023, a group of U.S. lawmakers called on the U.S. Securities and Exchange Commission to halt Shein's initial public offering until the company could verify that it does not use forced labor for its products. In August 2023, 16 U.S. states requested the Securities and Exchange Commission to audit Shein's supply chain for forced labor before its initial public offering.

In January 2025, Shein's general counsel in London, Yinan Zhu, refused to answer repeated questions in a parliamentary hearing about whether Shein sources cotton from Xinjiang.

=== Intellectual property infringement ===
Shein has been sued by independent creators and by companies such as Deckers Outdoor Corporation and Levi Strauss & Co. for copyright and trademark infringement. Most of these cases were settled out of court.

In a 2021 lawsuit, AirWair International Limited accused Shein and its sister company, Romwe, of selling copies of their designs (and calling them "Martins") at a cheaper price while using photos of authentic Dr. Marten shoes to "entice customers," to which Shein responded with a blanket denial of AirWair International's claims.

In March 2021, Ralph Lauren filed a trademark infringement and unfair competition lawsuit against Shein's parent company. In the complaint, Ralph Lauren said that Zoetop Business Co. selling clothing with a "confusingly similar" mark was an exploitation of their "goodwill and reputation of genuine Ralph Lauren products."

In 2022, Mexico's Secretariat of Culture questioned Shein's use of Mayan cultural elements in the design of one of its garments. The elements represented the "collective creativity" passed down through generations of Mayan people. Shein subsequently removed the item from its website.

==== Design theft accusations ====
Shein has been accused by dozens of artists, small fashion retailers, and brands such as Reclamare PH and Sincerely RIA, of copying their designs, including enamel pins. There is "little protection for creators", however, because items with basic, useful functions are not broadly covered by copyright laws, and any unique or creative element must be separated out when making claims. According to a lawyer interviewed by NPR, fast-fashion brands can walk a fine line by copying "just enough" without affecting anything that is "legally protected".

In 2018, Ilse Valfre, who owns the LA-based brand Valfré, was notified by her customers that Shein was selling "identical copies" of her products. Quinn Jones, who is the co-founder of the US company Kikay, said that he found earring designs on Shein that were very similar to Kikay's earrings. In response to the controversy, Shein removed the products and pledged to drop the supplier that produced the copied item.

To bring awareness to Shein's actions and to help support independent brands and artists, the hashtag "boycottShein" became popular on TikTok and Twitter in 2020. In 2021, Mariama Diallo, founder of and designer for Sincerely Ria, accused Shein of stealing her designs in a tweet that included comparative images to demonstrate her point.

In July 2023, a civil lawsuit was filed against Shein in the US alleging that its aggressive copyright infringement amounts to racketeering under the Racketeer Influenced and Corrupt Organizations Act (RICO). The lawsuit, filed by three fashion designers, claims that Shein produced, distributed, and sold exact copies of their creative work without permission. The lawsuit also alleged that Shein used artificial intelligence in the process, but what role it actually played is unclear.

An industry analyst expresses that as long as the company still has room to grow, it will be motivated to keep expanding its product offering as quickly as it can and accept that some of the items would not conform to intellectual property norms.

In January 2024, Japanese fashion giant Uniqlo said that it was suing Shein over copycats of a crossbody pouch. The lawsuit filed in Japan against Shein Japan and two subsidiaries demands the "immediate cessation of sales of the imitation products, and compensation for damages incurred", Uniqlo said in a statement.

=== Data security concerns ===
Shein experienced a data breach in 2018 that compromised the email addresses and encrypted passwords of 6.42 million users. According to the New York Attorney General's office, the company understated the scale of the breach. The number of affected accounts was actually 39 million; credit card information was also compromised, and many users were not notified or required to reset their password afterwards. In 2022, Shein's parent company, Zoetop, was fined $1.9 million by New York state authorities for its inadequate response to the data breach.

In 2023, US officials identified data-security risks associated with Shein and Temu as part of a broader review of Chinese-owned applications. In December 2023, the United States House Committee on Energy and Commerce requested more information from Shein on its data privacy practices and its relationship with the Chinese Communist Party. In January 2024, The Wall Street Journal reported that the Cyberspace Administration of China was scrutinizing Shein's data security practices.

In January 2026, Texas Governor Greg Abbott prohibited state employees from using Shein on all government devices and networks, citing data security and privacy concerns. In early May 2026, Ireland's Data Protection Commission announced a full-scale investigation into Shein and the amount and types of data about European customers that were being transferred back to China. GDPR regulations in the EU requires that data sent outside the EU, is given the same protections as if it was being sent within the EU.

=== App prohibition in India ===
In June 2020, the Shein app was banned in India due to privacy concerns. Following the 2020–2021 China–India skirmishes, the Ministry of Electronics and Information Technology of India classified the Shein app along with 59 other Chinese apps under Section 69A in The Information Technology Act, 2000, saying "[u]pon receiving recent credible inputs that such apps pose threat to sovereignty and integrity of India, the Government of India has decided to disallow the usage [...] both [on] mobile and non-mobile Internet-enabled devices." Section 69A grants the central government the "power to issue directions for blocking public access of any information through any computer resource".

=== Criticism for offensive images ===
In July 2020, a necklace with a swastika was removed from the site in response to widespread public criticism; the brand explained that it was a Hindu religious symbol, not a Nazi swastika.

In May 2021, Shein received criticism for offering a phone case with an image of a handcuffed Black man outlined in chalk. Shein issued an apology for the unintentionally offensive image and for using it without the permission of its original designer, who had created the image after the killing of Michael Brown. He later asked Shein to donate the proceeds from the sales to Black Lives Matter.

== See also ==
- SHEGLAM
- Temu
