= Chris Xu (entrepreneur) =

Chinese entrepreneur

- 许仰天
- Born: 1984 (age 41–42); Shandong, China
- Education: Qingdao University of Technology (BSc)
- Occupation: Businessman
- Title: Founder & CEO of Shein

Chinese name
- Simplified Chinese: 许仰天
- Traditional Chinese: 許仰天
Transcriptions
Standard Mandarin
- Hanyu Pinyin: Xǔ Yǎngtiān

Chris Xu, also known as Sky Xu and Xu Yangtian, is a Chinese entrepreneur and the founder of the online clothing retailer Shein. Xu is considered to be reserved and rarely appears in public.

== Biography ==
Xu is said to come from a poor family in Shandong province and to have studied at the Qingdao University of Technology. According to other sources, he studied at the George Washington University. He also has American citizenship and is a permanent resident of Singapore. According to information from Shein, he was born in China. After graduating, he worked in marketing at search engine optimization and became aware of the opportunities that arose from selling Chinese products abroad.

In 2008, Xu, together with two business partners, Wang Xiaohu and Li Peng, founded the online retailer Nanjing Dianwei Information Technology, which is said to have been a forerunner of Shein. Xu launched SheInside in Nanjing in 2011 to sell wedding clothing, which later became Shein. His two business partners claimed that Xu subsequently pushed them out of the company, stopped showing up at the office and took control of their business's PayPal account. Xu and Shein denied this version of events and threatened legal action.

In 2015, Xu moved his company's headquarters from Nanjing to Guangzhou and subsequently rose to become a global brand. In February 2022, Xu moved to Singapore according to reports, where Shein also moved its legal headquarters to. In the same year, Shein reached a valuation of $100 billion.

== Personal life ==
As of July 2025, Forbes estimated his net worth at $9.1 billion.
