= Lauren Sherman =

American journalist

Lauren Sherman is an American fashion journalist, and writer.

== Career ==
She graduated from Emerson College.

Sherman was a reporter at Forbes. She launched The Fashion Beat (http://www.tfbeat.com) in November 2009. She was Editor at Large at Fashionista, and was Executive Digital Editor at Lucky Magazine. She was the New York editor of the Business of Fashion. She is a writer for Puck.

She married Daniel Frommer.

== Works ==
- Sherman, Lauren; Fernandez, Chantal (2024-10-08). Selling Sexy. New York: Henry Holt. ISBN 978-1-250-85096-6.
