= Jacob Gallagher (writer) =

American fashion writer

- Occupations: Fashion writer and journalist

Jacob Gallagher is an American fashion writer and journalist. He is currently a men's fashion reporter for The New York Times and was previously the men's fashion columnist for The Wall Street Journal. He is also the co-author of The Men's Fashion Book, published by Phaidon Press in 2021. Although the book is encyclopedic in nature, the style and approach of the book has been praised by critics.
