= Colin Huang =

Chinese entrepreneur (born 1980)

- 黄峥
- Born: Huang Zheng; 1 January 1980 (age 46); Hangzhou, Zhejiang, China
- Education: Zhejiang University; University of Wisconsin (MS)
- Occupations: Businessman; investor; philanthropist; software engineer
- Known for: Founding Pinduoduo
- Title: Chairman and former CEO of Pinduoduo

Colin Huang Zheng (Chinese: 黄峥; pinyin: Huáng Zhēng; born 1 January 1980) is a Chinese businessman, investor, and philanthropist. He is the founder and former CEO of the e-commerce company Pinduoduo, which is now the largest agriculture platform in China. Huang is also the owner of at least three other limited liability Cayman companies, including Pinduoduo.

According to Forbes, Huang has an estimated net worth of US$27.6 billion as of 2026.

== Early life and education ==
Huang was born in 1980 in the outskirts of Hangzhou, Zhejiang. His parents were factory workers. He attended Hangzhou Foreign Language School.

At the age of 18, Huang began studying computer science at Chu Kuchen Honors College of Zhejiang University. During his freshman year, he was selected as a fellow at the Melton Foundation. Huang graduated with a master's degree in computer science from the University of Wisconsin in 2004.

== Business career ==
=== Early career ===
Huang interned at Google and Microsoft. In 2004, he became an engineer at Google. In 2006, he returned to China with Kai-fu Lee to expand Google services in China.

After resigning from Google in 2007, Huang started the e-commerce site Oku. He sold it for $2.2 million in 2010. In October, he ranked seventh on the 2019 Huron Report. In March, he ranked second in the 2020 Huron Global Young Zhuang Sect Self-Made Rich List. In November, he was named to the 2021 Forbes Rich List of Mainland China, ranking sixth with a wealth of ¥213.2 billion.

=== Pinduoduo IPO ===
Huang founded and led the Shanghai-based company Pinduoduo in 2015. Pinduoduo had a revenue of 1.4 billion yuan ($280 million) in 2017. In 2019, the company generated a revenue of $4.33 billion US dollars (30.14 billion RMB). The company became publicly traded following an initial public offering in the United States in July 2018, raising $1.6 billion in investment backing capital. After the public offering was floated on NASDAQ, Huang's 47% stake in Pinduoduo was valued at $14 billion, making him the thirteenth richest person in China.

On 1 July 2020, Huang stepped down as CEO of Pinduoduo but retained his titular position as the company's chairman. On 17 March 2021, Huang stepped down as chairman and entrusted the voting rights of his shares to the Board. The company said Huang will pursue "new, long-term opportunities."

== Philanthropy ==
By June 2020, Huang reduced his stake in Pinduoduo to 29.4% by donating 2.37% to a charitable foundation and 7.74% to the Pinduoduo Partnership. He also donated 2.37% to an irrevocable charity to promote social responsibility development and scientific research. Huang was named the leading philanthropist on the Hurun China Philanthropy List in 2021 after pledging US$1.85 billion for social responsibility projects and scientific research.

According to Bloomberg, Huang and the Pinduoduo founding team have donated 100 million (2.37% of Pinduoduo shares) to the Starry Night Charitable Trust to "support fundamental research in biomedical science, agriculture, and food."

== See also ==
- Duan Yongping
- Jack Ma
- Yiming Zhang
