= Pinduoduo =

Chinese e-commerce company

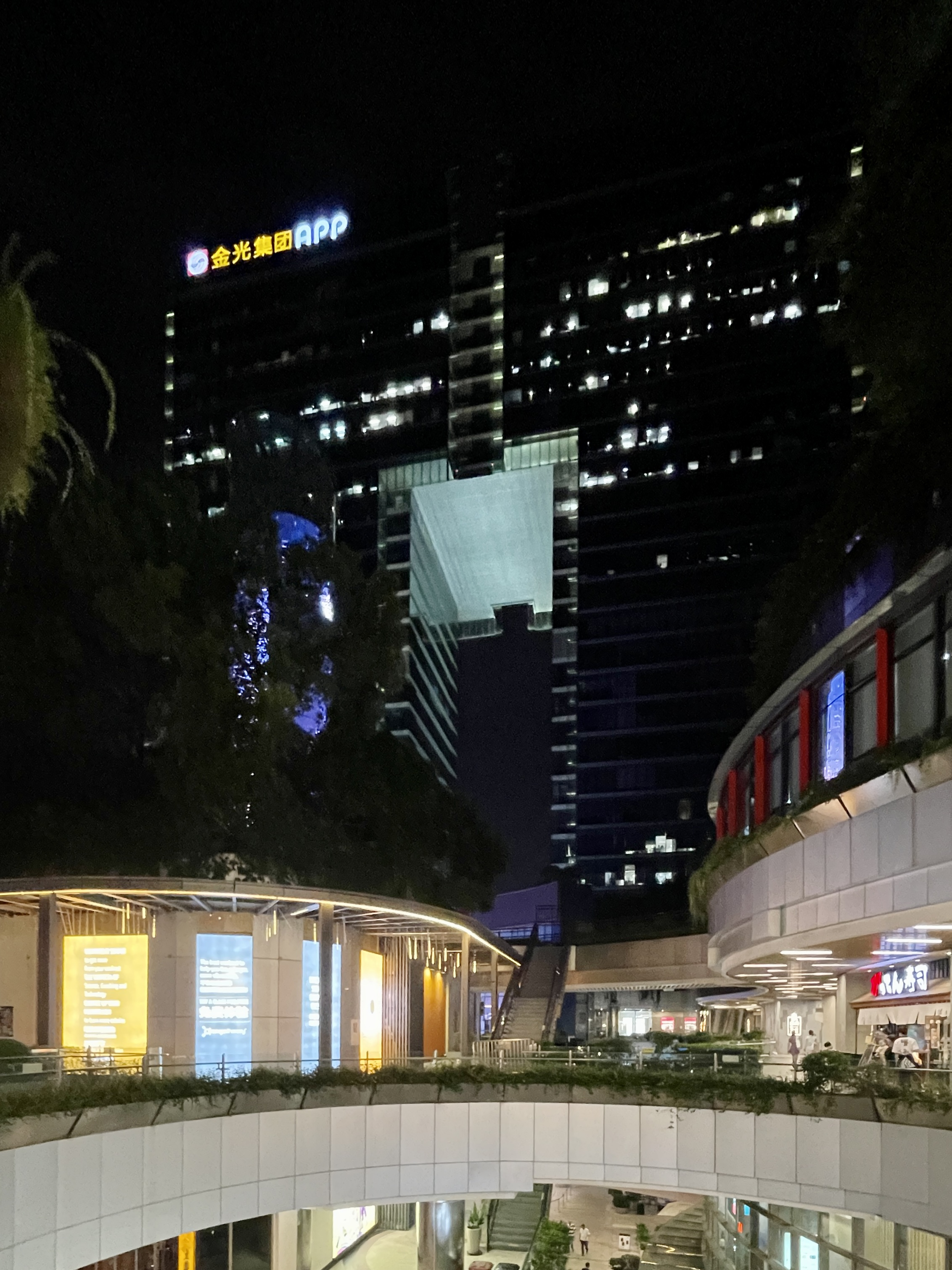
- Headquarters inside the Jin Hongqiao International Center, Shanghai
- Native name: 拼多多
- Type: Public
- Traded as: Nasdaq: PDD; Nasdaq-100 component
- Industry: Internet; Agriculture
- Founded: 2015; 11 years ago, China
- Founder: Colin Huang Zheng
- Headquarters: Shanghai, China
- Area served: China
- Key people: Lei Chen
- Products: E-commerce; Agriculture
- Revenue: ▲US$54.0 billion (2024)
- Net income: ▲US$15.4 billion (2024)
- Total assets: ▲US$69.2 billion (2024)
- Number of employees: 17,403 (2023)
- Parent: PDD Holdings
- Website: pinduoduo.com

Pinduoduo (Chinese: 拼多多; pinyin: Pīnduōduō) is a Chinese online retailer, with a focus on the traditional agriculture industry. The business is the largest asset of PDD Holdings, a company domiciled in the Cayman Islands and headquartered in Ireland that also owns the online marketplace Temu.

== History ==
Pinduoduo was founded in 2015 by Chinese businessman and software engineer Colin Huang and initially focused on the agriculture industry. It developed at a time when Alibaba and JD had significantly consolidated the Chinese e-commerce market and many analysts believed there was limited room for new market entrants.

On 7 June 2018, Legal Evening News reported that Pinduoduo investigated and shut down stores and removed listings that violated its platform policy against pornography and violence, following an earlier report by the newspaper.

On 20 January 2019, Pinduoduo reported to the police theft by hackers that exploited a loophole in their system and stole tens of millions of Yuan worth of vouchers.

During the initial COVID-19 lockdown in China in 2020, Pinduoduo started a program to assist rural Chinese farmers with selling their produce to customers online instead of relying on traditional in-person marketplaces. In August 2020, Pinduoduo launched Duo Duo Maicai, a service which enables consumers to preorder groceries for pickup at designated locations.

In 2020, Pinduoduo launched its B2B platform Duoduo Wholesale (Duoduo Pifa) to connect merchants with manufacturers and wholesalers. The feature was initially introduced without transaction commissions or promotion fees in order to attract suppliers. It mainly focused on the Chinese domestic market and primarily served merchants and suppliers operating within China. In 2020, Pinduoduo overtook Alibaba as China's top shopping app by user count, reaching 788.4 million annual active buyers by year's end, just edging Alibaba's 779 million (Tmall and Taobao combined). This marked the first major challenge to the dominance of Alibaba and JD.com in the market. Pinduoduo in 2023 reported 900 million annual active buyers while in 2025 Alibaba stated that Taobao and Tmall's platforms had reached around 1 billion annual active consumers.Pinduoduo pioneered viral sharing via WeChat, creating shopping teams where customers share product links with friends and family for group discounts. This turned customers into marketers with zero ad spend among segments in rural or low-income areas that Alibaba had traditionally ignored.

Pinduoduo generated RMB 4.17 trillion (US$590 billion) gross merchandise value (GMV) in 2021.

In September 2022, Pinduoduo's sister's company, Temu, was launched in the U.S. by PDD Holdings.

In 2023, PDD Holdings changed its legal domicile from Shanghai to Dublin.

In 2025-12-08, PDD launched Malaysia campaign, users in Malaysia can buy goods in PDD app with free shipping.

In March 2026, Pinduoduo announced the launch of 'Xinpinmu' (新拼姆), a new division to support the company's private-label projects. It is Pinduoduo's self-operated brand plan for the domestic and global market. It is not a new e-commerce platform, but PDD itself will manage the operation of its own brands directly.

== Corporate affairs ==
The key trends for Pinduoduo are (as of the financial year ending 31 December 2024):

	Revenue (USD billion)	Net income (USD billion)	Total assets (USD billion)	Employees
2017	0.3	(0.1)	2.1	1,159
2018	1.9	(1.5)	6.3	3,683
2019	4.3	(1.0)	10.9	5,828
2020	9.1	(1.1)	24.4	7,986
2021	14.7	1.2	28.4	9,762
2022	18.9	4.6	34.3	12,992
2023	34.9	8.5	49.0	17,403
2024	54.0	15.4	69.2	

== Criticism ==
=== Counterfeit products ===
Pinduoduo has been significantly criticised in domestic Chinese media for selling shanzhai products. The company responded with an open letter stating that it had, in a single week in August, shut down 1,128 stores, taken down more than 4 million listings, and blocked 450,000 suspected counterfeit goods listings from being published.

After it was listed on the Nasdaq in 2018, China's State Administration for Market Regulation announced probes into the retailer, based on reports of counterfeit materials available on the platform. Pinduoduo responded by intensifying efforts to remove counterfeit materials from its store. According to the company, it removed over 10.7 million suspicious items and blocked 40 million suspicious links on its platforms. Pinduoduo sought to reassure customers by stating that it would compensate customers with ten times the value of any counterfeit item found to have been sold through the platform. This was three times as much as the compensation mandated by China's Consumer Protection Law.

Pinduoduo also introduced a penalty on sellers of items under which it would freeze ten times the trading volume of any item found to be counterfeit. One thousand sellers responded with a protest in July 2018 at the company's headquarters, during which there were physical clashes with the company's security guards. Sellers have also challenged Pinduoduo's penalty in court, but as of at least 2021 Pinduoduo won a significant majority of these cases.

In April 2019, Pinduoduo was first named in the Office of the United States Trade Representative's list of Notorious Markets for Counterfeit Products and Piracy. As of 2023, Pinduoduo remains listed as a notorious market.

The company also disclosed that it had removed 500,715 items and closed more than 40 stores as of 4 February 2020, to protect consumers from counterfeit and substandard masks being sold by merchants hoping to profit amid the COVID-19 pandemic.

In April 2024, U.S. Sen. Tom Cotton (R-Ark.) and then-Sen. Marco Rubio (R-Fla.) wrote letters to the Biden administration, raising concerns about Temu and connections to forced labor and intellectual property theft. At least 20 states have filed consumer fraud litigation against the company over its labor practices and fraud concerns.

=== Malware concerns ===
In 2023, Google removed Pinduoduo's app from the Play Store after a Chinese cybersecurity firm found malware in app versions carried in Chinese app stores. Two days after releasing an update to address concerns, Pinduoduo disbanded the team of engineers and product managers who had developed the exploits. A majority of the team was transferred to Temu, working in various departments.

Six cybersecurity teams interviewed by CNN – including Finnish, Russian, US, and Israeli firms – as well as Chinese cybersecurity firm DarkNavy, all labeled Pinduoduo as malware or potential malware. In a report by Bloomberg News, a researcher from Kaspersky Labs stated the following: "Some versions of the Pinduoduo app contained malicious code, which exploited known Android vulnerabilities to escalate privileges, download and execute additional malicious modules, some of which also gained access to users' notifications and files".

Pinduoduo maintains a data sharing agreement with a unit of the People's Daily, the official newspaper of the Central Committee of the Chinese Communist Party.

=== Non-compete agreements ===
In 2024, the Financial Times and The Wall Street Journal reported that Pinduoduo sued several former employees for violating non-compete clauses. The evidence Pinduoduo submitted to court includes video recordings of the former employees going to work for Pinduoduo's rivals. The company said it does not "engage in any illegal or unethical surveillance practices of current or former employees."
