= The True Cost =

- Theatrical release poster
- Directed by: Andrew Morgan
- Produced by: Michael Ross
- Edited by: Michael Ross
- Music by: D
- Production companies: Untold Creative; Life Is My Movie Entertainment
- Distributed by: Life Is My Movie Entertainment; Bullfrog Films (home media)
- Release dates: May 15, 2015 (Cannes); May 29, 2015 (United States)
- Running time: 93 minutes
- Country: United States
- Language: English
- Budget: US$500,000

The True Cost is a 2015 documentary film directed by Andrew Morgan that focuses on fast fashion. It discusses several aspects of the garment industry from production—mainly exploring the life of low-wage workers in developing countries—to its after-effects such as river and soil pollution, pesticide contamination, disease and death. Using an approach that looks at environmental, social and psychological aspects, it also examines consumerism and mass media, ultimately linking them to global capitalism. The documentary is a collage of several interviews with environmentalists, garment workers, factory owners, and people organizing fair trade companies or promoting sustainable clothing production.

Morgan's attention was drawn to the topic after the 2013 Savar building collapse when a commercial building in Bangladesh named Rana Plaza toppled and killed over a thousand workers. Starting the project in October of that year, he traveled to thirteen countries to collect information and conduct interviews. The film was funded by Kickstarter and premiered as a side screening during the 2015 Cannes Film Festival in May 2015 before its release in select American and British theaters later that month. Critics have been both positive and dismissive, with reviews ranging from "vitally important documentary" to "vague liberal agitprop".

== Content ==
In The True Cost, Morgan examines the garment industry—specifically the fast fashion business— and links it to consumerism, globalization, capitalism, structural poverty, and oppression. In the film, it is stated that in the 1960s, the American fashion industry produced 95% of the clothes its people wore, while in the 2010s only 3% is produced in the United States, with the rest produced in developing countries. Operating in countries such as Bangladesh, India, Cambodia, and China, major brand manufacturers minimize costs and maximize profits by having companies in those countries competing against each other. The international brands pressure the factory owners, threatening to close and move production to another country if the clothes are not cheap enough; the owners, in turn, pressure their workers and, as one owner says, "They're hampering me, I'm hampering my workers".

According to Morgan, despite garment manufacturing being a three-trillion-dollar industry, the working conditions in those countries are poor. In addition to having to work in those conditions and live on low salaries, these workers have a difficult time demanding their rights; Bangladeshi workers in Dhaka may be beaten by their employers while Cambodians are shot by police. In Dhaka, workers must work in hot and chemical-ridden environments and structurally unsound buildings. The film shows the events of the 2013 Savar building collapse when an eight-story commercial building named Rana Plaza collapsed. Just prior to that, workers had been forced into the factory even though a crack was seen in the walls.

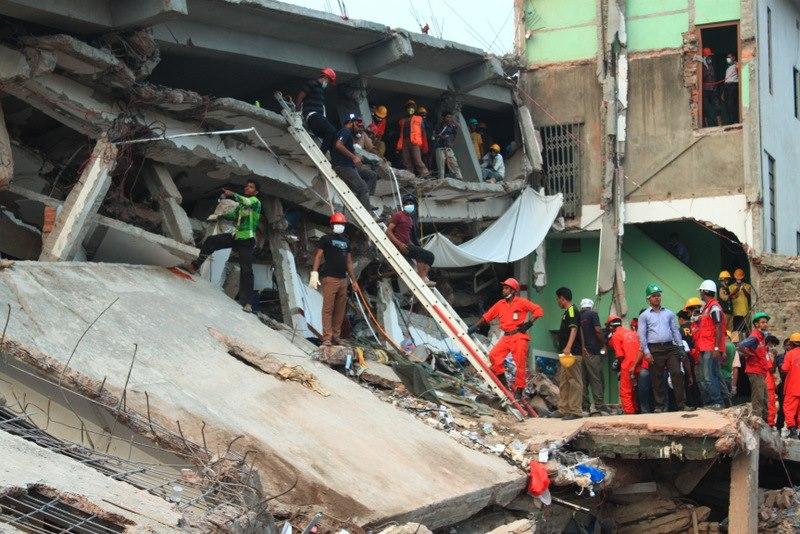
The Rana Plaza collapse in Bangladesh, an event that sparked Morgan's interest in making the film, is explored as an example of poor working conditions in developing countries.

The film shows how the demand for cotton in India has led to the planting of genetically modified (GM) cotton, and how the monopoly inherent in its use by seed companies causes an increase in the price of cotton, leading to suicides among farmers who lose their land to these companies because they cannot pay the higher seed prices. GM crops need more pesticides, causing environmental damage, birth defects leading to mental and physical disabilities among the Punjab people, and an increased rate of cancer. The film claims that sometimes the companies that produce the pesticides are the same ones that produce the needed medications. A similar scenario occurs in contaminated cotton fields in Texas, where pesticides are causing brain tumors. The garment industry is the second-most-polluting industry the world, according to the film, which is illustrated by leather tanneries pouring chromium into the Ganges River in Kanpur, India.

In the film, the focus returns to America, where it looks at how media affects the desire of people—especially teenagers—to buy and create an identity focused on consumption. This is borne out by a 500% worldwide increase in clothing consumption compared to the 1990s. However, clothes are quickly disposed of; an average American wastes 82 lb (37 kg) of textiles a year. Only 10% percent of donated clothes go to thrift shops; the rest go to landfills, such as those in Port-au-Prince, Haiti. Aside from weakening local industries by this constant disposal of clothes, land and water are polluted because most apparel is made from non-biodegradable materials.

Throughout the film, Morgan shows people who defend the low-cost prices such as Benjamin Powell of the Free Market Institute at Texas Tech University and Kate Ball-Young, former sourcing manager of Joe Fresh. Ball-Young says that, in comparison to more precarious alternative work, the fashion industry is a good choice for workers. Powell argues sweatshops are "part of the very process that raises living standards and leads to better working conditions over time". In contrast, the film shows a Texas organic cotton farmer, eco fashion activist Livia Firth and her sustainability-focused consulting firm, and people who manage fair trade clothing companies, such as animal-rights activist Stella McCartney, People Tree's Safia Minney, Redress's Christina Dean, and Patagonia's Vincent Stanley.

Other individuals interviewed and appearing in the film include: television personalities Stephen Colbert and John Oliver, economist Richard D. Wolff, John Hilary of the charity War on Want, professor of media studies Mark Crispin Miller, psychologist Tim Kasser, physician Pritpal Singh, and environmentalists Rick Ridgeway and Vandana Shiva.

== Production ==
The True Cost was produced by Morgan's Untold Creative in association with Life is My Movie Entertainment. The documentary's budget of US$500,000 was obtained through individual investors and Kickstarter, with Kickstarter crowd funders contributing US$76,546. Morgan refused to accept money from companies, non-governmental organizations, and foundations to keep the project "autonomous". During two years beginning in October 2013, Morgan traveled to twenty-five cities in thirteen countries, where he collected information and conducted interviews. Some of the interviews were made possible through the efforts of executive producer Livia Firth, who introduced Morgan to eco-fashion. Morgan had planned to interview Firth, but when she learned about the project she became interested in it and recommended people for him to talk to. Firth became heavily involved with the project, and after completing several interviews with her, Morgan showed Firth the final cut and made her an executive producer for the film. He had also planned to conduct interviews with 25 "major" brands, but none of them agreed to appear in the film.

With no knowledge of the fashion industry, Morgan decided to make a film on the topic after being shocked by the news of the collapse of Rana Plaza. After spending several days getting information, and discovering the industry's human rights violations and "staggering environmental impacts", he was sure he had to make the film. He had also previously had an appreciation for the genre, saying he was "actually fascinated by those [fashion] films that follow one person". Like Morgan a non-connoisseur of fashion, executive producer and eco-activist Lucy Siegle said that she does not like such films as they are usually limited to exploring the aesthetic aspects of the industry. It is The True Cost differential in her opinion; it "goes there and then some‍—‌it unravels the grim, gritty, global supply chain of fast fashion". Nevertheless, the film purposely does not give viewers a clear answer on how to solve the problems as there are "no straightforward answers". Morgan commented, "I'm probably most proud that we avoided easy answers and instead chose to trust people to both feel and think deeply about the issues raised."

This doesn't have to be [a] liberal versus pro-business debate. What it has to become is an honest debate. This isn't about 'Let's throw the system out the window.' I'm not against the idea of competition and profit and businesses. ... Those are really good forces. We can channel those forces in a more humane and more sustainable way. It's very similar to what's happened with the food movement. A lot of it starts with customer demand.

— Andrew Morgan, director

Regarding the ultimate objectives behind the making of the film, Morgan said he was not trying to blame just a single company nor the fast fashion industry as "it did not invent a very irresponsible way of manufacturing, it did not invent overmarketing the consumption of things." The director said the film was intended to be a caution on the "incessant consumption of mediocre stuff" and an incentive to view shopping as something more than a hobby, adding that buying is "a moral act and there is a chain reaction of consequences". He commented he was not trying to be "anti-business or anti-market" but was just reaffirming basic human rights and showing the limits of natural resources.

Morgan said his main hope for the film was that it would spark a debate on the topic and make people "more mindful and choose things that support life and not take it away." Morgan thought he had included a good number of counter-examples of how people can make a difference, so the film does not simply show "the destructive ways this industry operates but also the opportunity to reinvent it" through "small choices [that] actually impact those [big problems]." Ultimately, he considered his film an introduction to the topic that was able to connect several elements, any one of which would be worth being covered in a film.

== Release and response ==
To coincide with Fashion Revolution Day, which seeks transparency in clothes production, the trailer of The True Cost was released on April 24, 2015. It premiered at Cannes as a side screening during the 2015 Cannes Film Festival on May 15, when film producer Harvey Weinstein said, "This movie's going to shock the fashion world". A week before the official release, the crowd funders received personal links to allow them to watch the film. Distributed by Life is My Movie and Bullfrog Films, It was released on May 29 through iTunes, video on demand services, DVD, Blu-Ray, and in select theaters in Los Angeles, New York, Tokyo, and London. It has since been translated into 19 languages. After its release, companies that were subjects of the film, including H&M and Zara, defended themselves in a CNBC article. The film has been subject to dissonant reviews that ranged from extremely positive to very dismissive. Aggregator site Rotten Tomatoes says there were five positive reviews and three negative reviews‍—‌which indicates that 63% of critics were favorable‍—‌and that it received an average score of 6.3. Based on one positive, two mixed, and one negative review, Metacritic assigns an average score of 46 out of 100. It also received an Environmental Media Awards nomination for Best Documentary Film.

The New York Times reviewer Jeannette Catsoulis praised it for avoiding the dichotomy of "corporate greed versus environmental well-being", adding that instead of being an exposé, "Under the gentle, humane investigations of its director, what emerges most strongly is a portrait of exploitation that ought to make us more nauseated than elated over those $20 jeans". Tamsin Blanchard, for the Daily Telegraph, called it a work that will "do for the fast fashion business what Food Inc did for fast food". The Hollywood Reporter's Frank Scheck commended it for approaching an issue often "untouched by major news organizations". He said the film was "more despair-inducing than instructive", but was optimistic about its possible impact on the fashion culture, citing the effect that films such as Super Size Me and Fast Food Nation had on the fast food industry. Carson Quiros of Paste also compared it to the former film. David Noh of Film Journal International called it a "vitally important documentary" that contains scenes that "are enough to make you never want to go shopping again". Gabrielle Wilson of MTV stated it is "hard to swallow but never feels preach-y or like a barrage of depressive factoids" and will empower viewers to change their shopping habits. Casey Jarman said she was disappointed by "the only solution offered: eliminating global capitalism"; however, ultimately, she wrote for Willamette Week that it is a "compelling film, which is, above all else, a badly needed conversation-starter".

Alan Scherstuhl wrote a very critical piece for The Village Voice; he called the film predictable and repetitive, and said it contained several facts that have been clearly "common knowledge for years". Scherstuhl said it is scattershot, "a litany of Things We Can All Agree Are Bad", but ultimately jumps between several topics‍—‌without sufficient detail, in his opinion‍—‌but comes to no conclusion or alternative. Scherstuhl said not even common people would have their beliefs challenged and that they would "dismiss it as the vague liberal agitprop that it is". Similarly while saying the film discusses important issues, both Genevieve Koski of The Dissolve and Jennie Kermode of Eye for Film said it deals with several themes quickly but does not expand upon any of them. Koski said, "The True Cost is methodical to a fault", while Kermode said it is "a good starting point" on the topic. Fashion critic Vanessa Friedman said it has an "easy-to-swallow accessibility" but that it "oversimplifies" some aspects of the industry. In addition to commenting on the lack of attribution for "lots of eye-popping statements", she said, "trying to do everything, he skirted a lot of things". The Los Angeles Times' Martin Tsai criticized Morgan for interviewing his own executive producers, saying "the effects of fertilizers ... don't appear quite as tangible", and faulted Morgan for not exploring "retailer markups that could have gone toward improving sweatshop conditions instead of profit margins", but appreciated that he had interviewed people with both pro and con views. Lizzie Crocker of The Daily Beast said Morgan had socialist views and that the film implies he wants to go back to the 1960s. She also criticized some interviewees, such as Miller, whom she called a "conspiracy theorist", and Wolff, whom she called a "Marxist idealist". Crocker was dismissive of the film, saying, "the film loses focus and credibility, criticizing not just the fashion industry but the global capitalist system that supports it".

== See also ==
- China Blue
- Cotton production in the United States
- Textile industry in Bangladesh
