= ITMA (disambiguation) =

ITMA may refer to:

- Irish Traditional Music Archive, a national reference archive and resource centre for the traditional song, instrumental music and dance of Ireland, located in Dublin
- It's That Man Again, a BBC radio comedy programme which ran from 1939 to 1949.
- It's That Man Again (film), a 1943 film version of the radio show
- Chartered Institute of Trade Mark Attorneys, a UK professional body of trade mark attorneys
- ITMA exhibition, (Note: Article in development, meanwhile see Jacquard machine) a worldwide series of international textile and garment technology exhibition, held every four years since 1951.
- "ITMA", a song by Half Man Half Biscuit on the 1997 album Voyage to the Bottom of the Road
