= Sally Fox =

Sally Fox (or Sallie Fox) may refer to:

- Sallie Fox (1845–1913), California pioneer
- Sally Fox (politician) (1951–2014), American lawyer and politician
- Sally Fox (inventor) (born 1959), American inventor
- Sally Fox (photographer) (1929–2006), American photographer and book editor
