= Wool& (clothing brand) =

American merino-wool clothing brand

- Industry: Apparel
- Founded: 2018
- Founder: Mac Bishop
- Headquarters: Portland, Oregon, United States
- Products: Women's clothing
- Website: wooland.com

Wool& (stylized as wool&) is an American womenswear brand that produces merino-wool apparel, including dresses. The brand was launched in 2018 by entrepreneur Mac Bishop as a sister brand to the menswear label Wool & Prince.

The company has received media attention for its 100 Day Dress Challenge, which encourages participants to wear the same dress for 100 consecutive days and document the process.

== History ==
Mac Bishop, who founded Wool & Prince in 2013, is a member of the Pendleton Woolen Mills family. Wool& is a spinoff brand created to extend Bishop's merino-wool focus into womenswear, with garments designed to be worn for extended periods between washes.

== 100 Day Dress Challenge ==
Wool&'s "100 Day Dress Challenge" centers on wearing a single Wool& dress for 100 consecutive days while documenting outfits (often with daily photos). The participants could earn a voucher of 100 USD after completing the 100-day period.

In May 2021, The Guardian reported 978 successful completions of the challenge. Treehugger reported more than 1,100 completions and 1,173 official participants in 2021. Cornellians reported in 2025 that more than 8,000 people had completed the challenge.

== Materials and sourcing ==
The Woolmark Company has described Wool& and Wool & Prince as having traceable merino-wool collections sourced exclusively from Australia, and has framed the garments' odor- and wrinkle-resistance as enabling less frequent laundering.

== Reception ==
Fast Company included Wool& in a wider "wash-less" trend in fashion and linked the approach to environmental arguments about the impact of laundering over a garment's lifetime. In a 2021 review column, Outside wrote that the brand had been "making internet rounds" due to the 100-day challenge and reviewed a Wool& merino-blend dress, noting both benefits associated with wool and a tendency to not wrinkle during extended sitting.

== Gallery ==
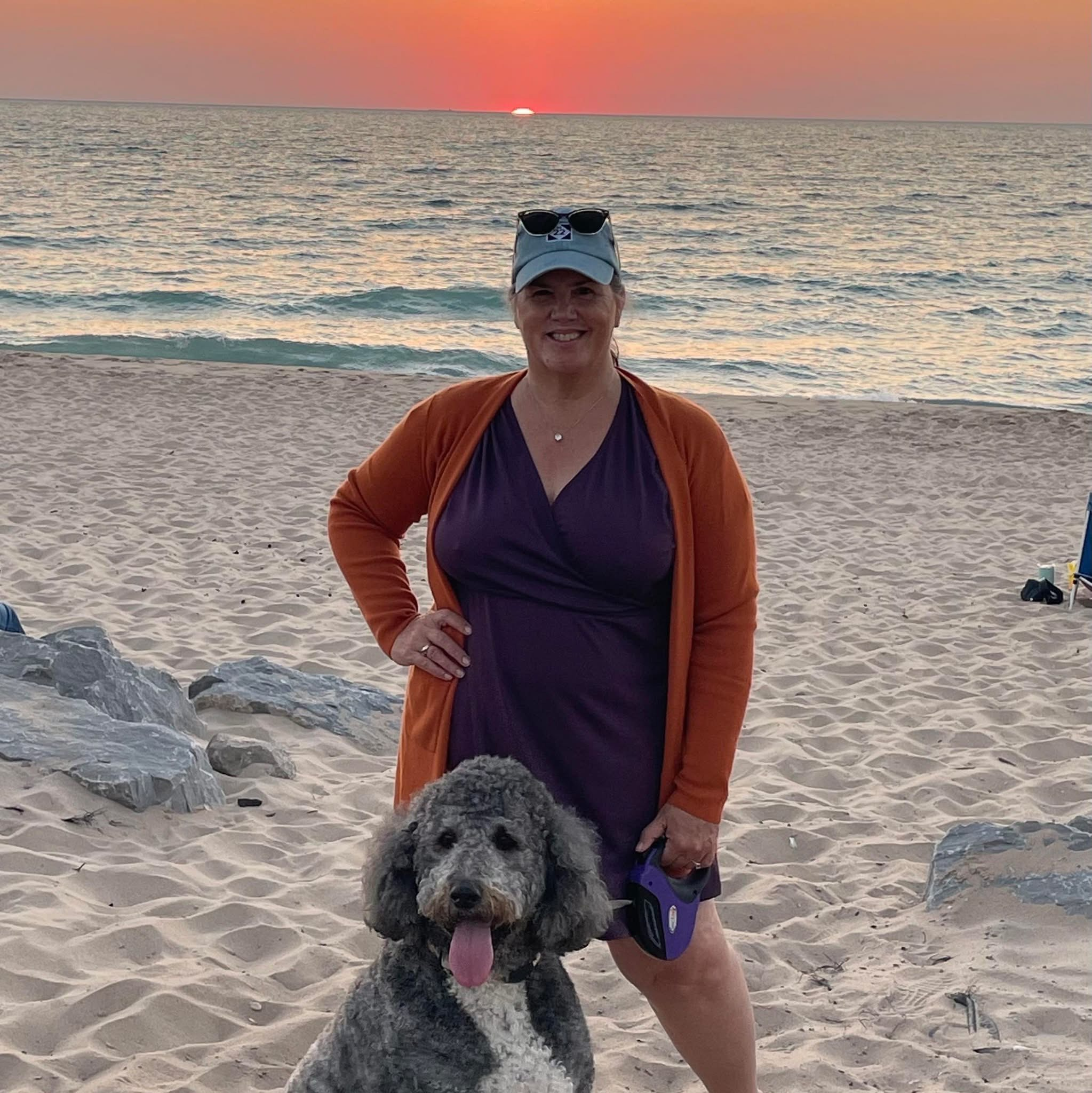
wool& Brooklyn dress in marionberry color

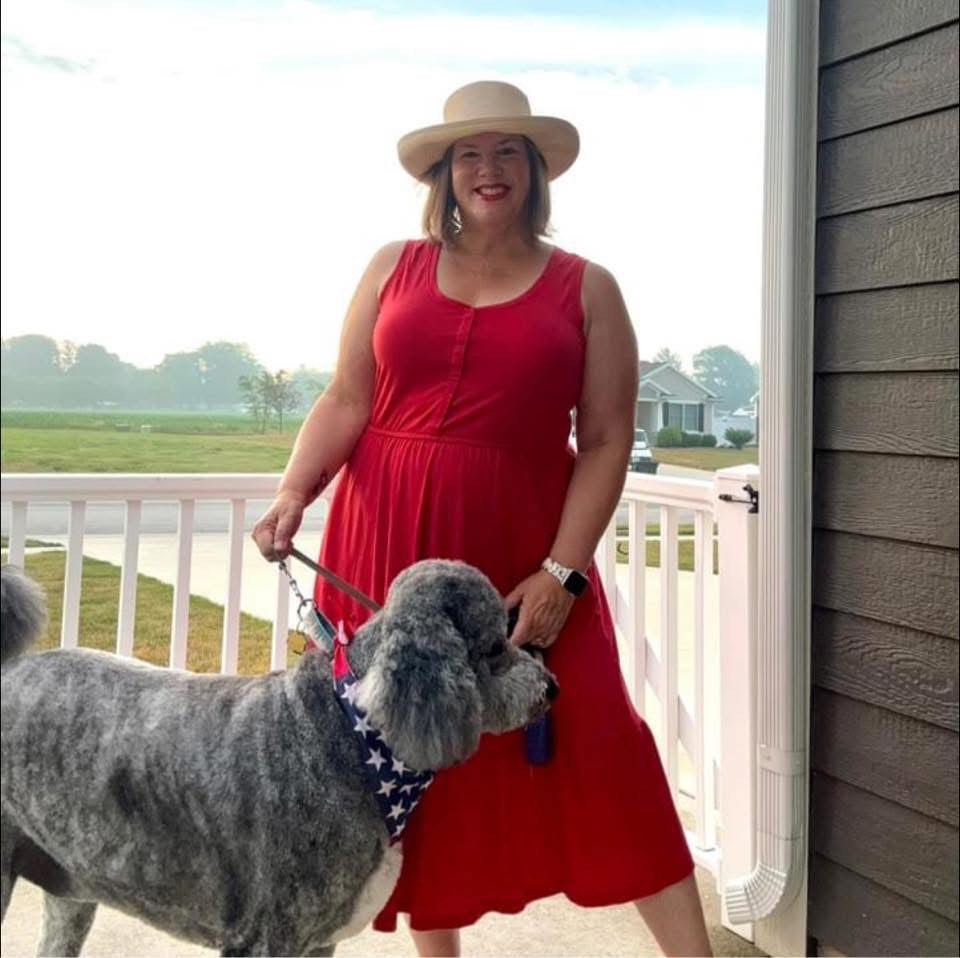
wool& Grace dress in coral color

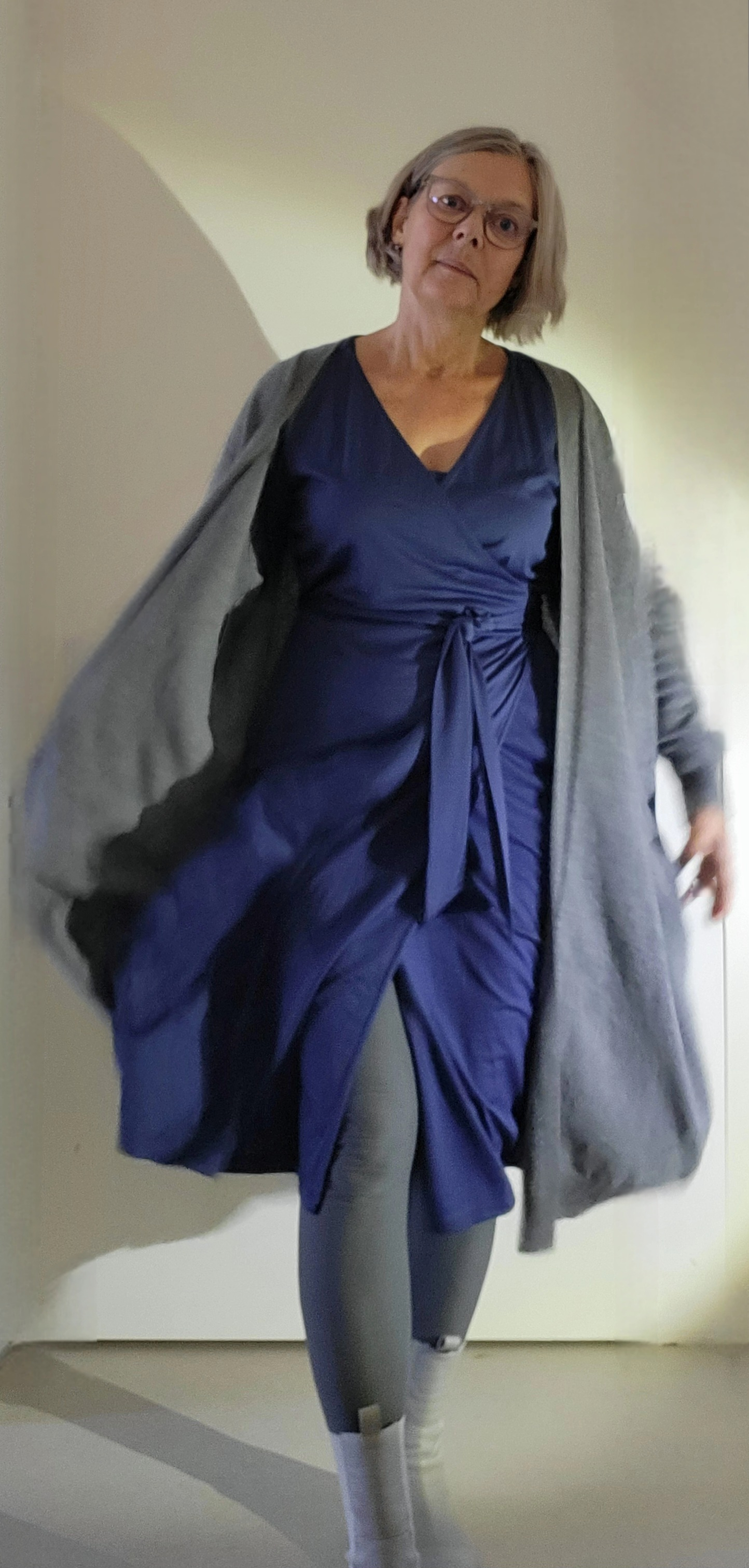
wool& Alana dress in aurora blue color

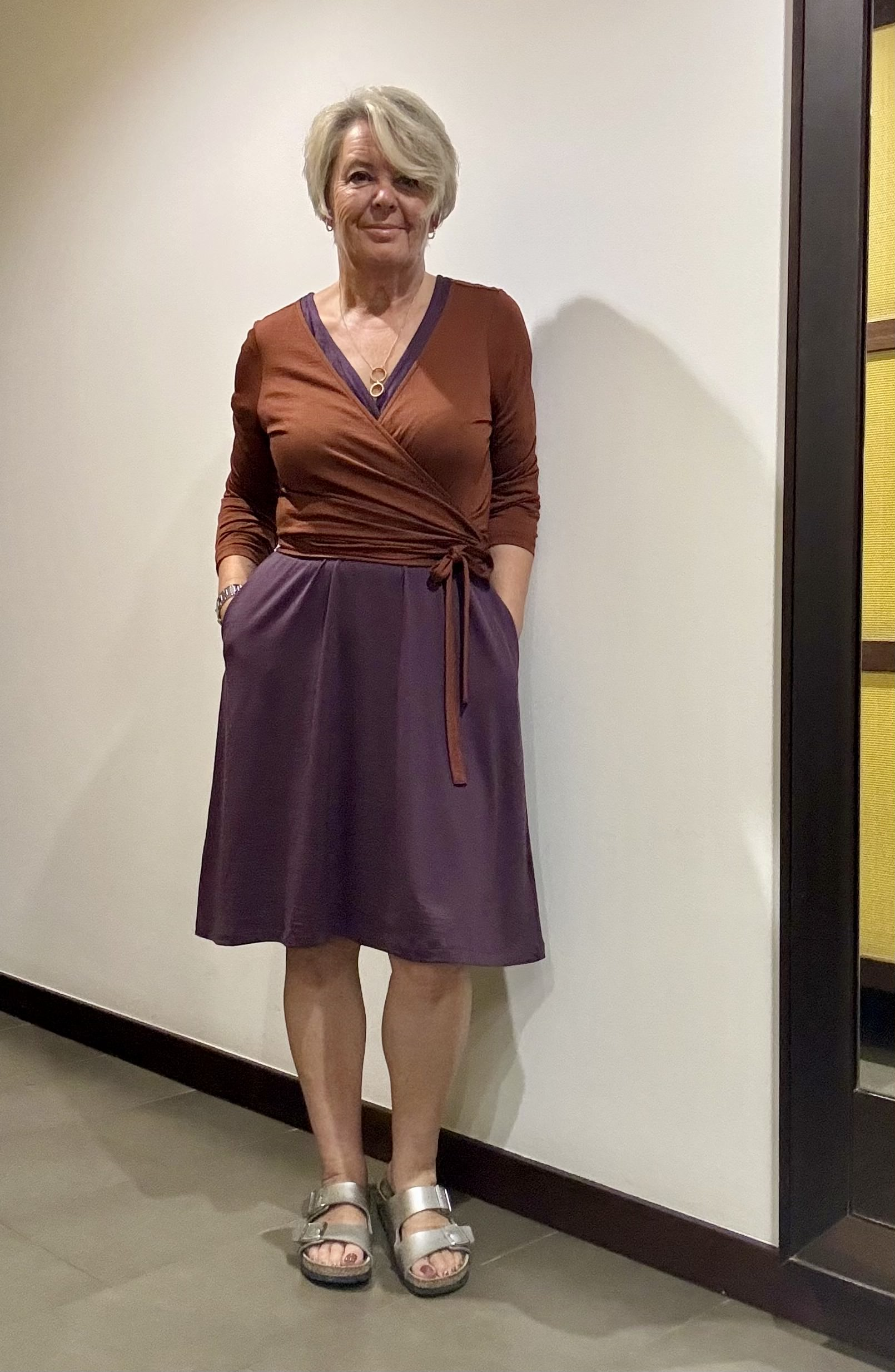
wool& Natalia wrap top

== See also ==
- Sustainable fashion
