= Lynda Grose =

American fashion designer

- Education: Kingston University, London, UK
- Known for: Sustainable Fashion/Design

Lynda Grose is a designer, educator, and author known for her pioneering work in sustainable fashion design.

== Career ==
In 1990 Grose co-founded Esprit's e-collection division, a five-year research and development project marketed in 13 countries, which is cited "as the first ecologically responsible clothing line developed by a major corporation" and "set pioneering standards for the textile industry". Ecollection was founded as part of Esprit's company-wide focus on environmental awareness, begun by Esprit co-founder Doug Tompkins. Ecollection featured Grose’s work researching the environmental impact of making Esprit clothing - from growing fibers, to dyeing, manufacturing and garment finishing. Ecollection used organic cotton, and ‘low impact’ dyes, which increased the fixation of dyestuffs to the cloth, and reduced energy and water use ( bi-functional reactive dyes and cold pad batch dyeing). Grose also began working with crafts cooperatives to hand-knit sweaters (Appalachian by Design)and make buttons and jewelry from tagua nuts (through Conservation International). Grose believed that community development and fair treatment of textile workers was as important a part of the project as using more sustainable materials.

In 2018, Grose co-founded the Union of Concerned Researchers in Fashion with Kate Fletcher, Timo Rissanen and Mathilda Tham. UCRF is a self-funded, fully independent global community of over 200 researchers and fashion practitioners working for systems change in the fashion sector. Grose is Professor in Fashion Design and Critical Studies at California College of the Arts. She is a founding member of The Center for Sustainable Design, Surrey, England, and the International Society for Sustainable Design,. She serves on the board of the Sustainable Cotton Project and U.S. an external advisor for UC Davis’s Maria Minnetti Shrem Institute for Sustainable Design, Fashion and Textiles.

== Work ==
Lynda Grose co-authored with Dr. Kate Fletcher the book Fashion and Sustainability Design for Change. She has published in journals and magazines and has contributed to 'Opening up the Wardrobe: a methods book' (Novus), 'Fashion Fibers: Designing for Sustainability', (Bloomsbury), The Routledge Handbook on Sustainable Fashion (Routledge), Sustainable Textiles: Life Cycle and Environmental Impact (Woodhouse Publishing, London), and Sustainability in Fashion and Textiles: Values, Design, Production and Consumption (Greenleaf Publishing).

=== Awards and nominations ===
In 2007, she was listed on Grist's list of “15 Green Fashionistas".
