= International Textile Machinery Association exhibition =

Exhibition related to textile materials

The ITMA exhibition is an event in the textile industry, where manufacturers from around the world gather to showcase their latest developments, innovations, and advancements in textile machinery. Begun in 1951, it serves as a platform for professionals in the textile supply chain to gain insights into the latest technological advancements and new machinery and devices that can enhance textile manufacturing processes, including the production of fibers, yarns, and the processing and finishing of textile products.

== History ==
ITMA is not the first of its kind exhibition. In the past, there have been references to exhibitions that are closely associated with it. One of them is the International Cotton Exposition. The International Cotton Exposition was a world fair held in Atlanta, Georgia, in 1881, showcasing the progress made in the city and developments in cotton production since its destruction in the Civil War and symbolizing the end of the Reconstruction Era and sectional tensions in the country.

The first international textile exhibition was held in 1951 at the "Grand Palais de la Foire de Lille" in Lille, France. Since 1951, the event has been held every four years in different countries. Soon the exhibition grew in size and participation of exhibitors. There were only 278 exhibitors at the first ITMA; the number increased to 881 at Basel, held in 1967, which was the fifth event.

=== Past ITMA exhibitions ===
Edition	City, Country
ITMA 1951	Lille, France
ITMA 1955	Brussels, Belgium
ITMA 1959	Milan, Italy
ITMA 1963	Hannover, Germany
ITMA 1967	Basel, Switzerland
ITMA 1971	Paris, France
ITMA 1975	Milan, Italy
ITMA 1979	Hannover, Germany
ITMA 1983	Milan, Italy
ITMA 1987	Paris, France
ITMA 1991	Hannover, Germany
ITMA 1995	Milan, Italy
ITMA 1999	Paris, France
ITMA 2003	Birmingham, United Kingdom
ITMA 2007	Munich, Germany
ITMA 2011	Barcelona, Spain
ITMA 2015	Milan, Italy
ITMA 2019	Barcelona, Spain
ITMA 2023	Milan, Italy
ITMA 2027	Hannover, Germany

== CEMATEX ==
CEMATEX is a consortium of nine national European textile machinery associations that owns ITMA. According to CEMATEX, it is "the world's largest international textile and garment technology exhibition."

== Technological Developments in the Textile Industry ==
Several machine suppliers display machines and textile testing devices at the International Textile Machinery Association exhibition that can make production more efficient and cost-effective. The following are some examples:

ITMA 1967 showcased developments in open-end spinning, and advancements in jet dyeing, Cotton maturity testing devices with near-infrared (NIR) technology were displayed at the 4th International Textile Machinery Association exhibition in Hanover, Germany. At the 12th ITMA, Shima Seiki presented how to knit a whole garment (1995).

== See also ==
- List of world's fairs
- International Bureau of Expositions
- World's fair (EXPO)
