= Naturally colored cotton =

Type of cotton

A naturally brown cotton boll

Naturally colored cotton is cotton that has been bred to have colors other than the yellowish off-white typical of modern commercial cotton fibres. Colors grown include red, green and several shades of brown. The cotton's natural color does not fade.

This form of cotton also feels softer to the skin and has a pleasant smell. Naturally colored cotton is still relatively rare because it requires specialized harvest techniques and facilities, making it more expensive to harvest than white cotton. By the 1990s, most indigenous colored cotton landraces or cultivars grown in Africa, Asia, and Central and South America were replaced by all-white, commercial varieties.

== History ==
Naturally colored cotton is believed to have originated in the Americas around 5000 years ago in the Andes. Naturally colored cotton today mostly comes from pre-Columbian stocks created by the indigenous peoples of South America (Vreeland, 1999). Mochica Indians could be credited with growing naturally colored cotton of many hues, which they maintained for over the last two millennia on the northern coast of Peru.

== Colors ==
Natural color in cotton comes from pigments found in cotton; these pigments can produce shades ranging from tan to green and brown. Naturally pigmented green cotton derives its color from caffeic acid, a derivative of cinnamic acid, found in the suberin (wax) layer which is deposited in alternating layers with cellulose around the outside of the cotton fiber. This type of fiber provides additional protection to human skin from the sun's UV rays. While green-colored cotton comes from wax layers, brown and tan cotton derive their color from tannin vacuoles in the lumen of the fiber cells.

== Limitations ==
The naturally colored cotton has a small fiber and is not suitable for heavy machine spinning. During World War II an insufficient supply of dye led to the cultivation of green and brown cotton in the Soviet Union. The US government also showed interest in cultivation of naturally colored cotton but later aborted the project due to low yield and short staple length.

“Later on US government instructed a famous agronomist, J.O. Ware, to study the Soviet cotton plants to determine whether they were commercially viable in the U.S. Ware and his colleagues concluded that the green and brown cotton plants yielded too little lint that was too short in staple length. Colored cotton was officially regulated to obscurity. Only in a few places were people still entranced by its possibilities.”

Due to the smaller fiber, it is impractical to use naturally colored cotton for clothing manufacture. But sometimes colored cotton is mixed in with conventional white cotton to make its fiber longer and stronger than other naturally colored cotton, to be used in typical looms. Since this hybrid cotton fiber is stronger, it is being used by Levi Strauss, L.L. Bean, Eileen Fisher, and Fieldcrest for clothes using khaki cloth.

== Commercial cultivation ==
Commercial cultivation still continues in South America as many big US companies such as Patagonia, Levi Strauss, and Esprit are buying naturally grown cotton along with white cotton which requires significant amount of insecticides and pesticides.

== Upgrade in technology ==
In 1982, Sally Fox a graduate in Integrated Pest Management from University of California started researching colored cotton, integrated her knowledge and experience in technology and introduced the first long fiber of naturally colored cotton. Sally Fox later started her company, Natural Cotton Colors, Inc. and obtained patents in different shades including: green, coyote brown, buffalo brown, and Palo Verde green under FoxFiber.

Later on, the technology was further improved by cotton breeder Raymond Bird in 1984. Bird began experimenting in Reedley, California, with red, green, and brown cotton to improve fiber quality. Later on Raymond Bird, along with his brother and C. Harvey Campbell Jr., a California agronomist and cotton breeder, formed BC Cotton Inc. to work with naturally colored cottons. Naturally colored cotton usually come in four standard colors - green, brown, red (a reddish brown) and mocha (similar to tan).

== Benefits ==
There is experimental evidence to demonstrate that naturally pigmented cottons, especially green cotton, have excellent sun protection properties, when compared with unbleached white cotton that needs to be treated with dyes or finishes to obtain similar properties. It is hypothesized that the pigments in naturally pigmented cotton fibers are present to provide protection from ultraviolet radiation for the embryonic cotton seeds, however they can also provide protection from the sun’s harmful rays for consumers who wear garments manufactured from these naturally pigmented fibers. The UPF values of the naturally pigmented cottons examined in a university study remained high enough, even after 80 AFUs (AATCC Fading Units) of light exposure and repeated laundering, that the fabrics merited sun protection ratings of “good” to “very good” according to ASTM 6603 voluntary labeling guidelines for UV-protective textiles.

== Use of dyes ==
Naturally colored cotton is different from white cotton as it does not need to be dyed. According to agronomists, the cost of dyeing could be up to half of the cost, and not dyeing is also environmentally friendly, as it eliminates disposal costs for toxic dye waste. Naturally colored cotton is also resistant to deterioration as compared with the conventional dyed white cotton. After laundering, the color becomes stronger and more intense, a characteristic documented during research studies at Texas Tech University. The length of time required to "bring out" the color varies with color and variety. Eventually, the colors may start to return to their original color. Some naturally colored cotton darkens with exposure to the sun. However, green is less stable and fades to tan when exposed to sunlight.

== Cost ==
Due to the non-industrialized product, naturally colored cottons yield less per acre, but growers are paid higher prices for their harvest. In 1993, colored cotton prices ranged from $3.60 to $4.50 per pound compared to conventional white cotton at $0.60 to $0.90 per pound.
