= People Tree =

Anglo-Japanese apparel company

People Tree Fair Trade Group Ltd.
- Type: Limited
- Industry: Clothing, home wares and food design, distribution and retailing; holding company
- Founded: 2007
- Founders: Safia Minney, James Minney
- Headquarters: London, United Kingdom
- Area served: United Kingdom; Europe; United States; Japan; Australia; New Zealand; Scandinavia
- Key people: James Minney (CEO); CJ Wilson (director); Richard Minney (director); Hana Sim (trademark owner)
- Products: Clothing, fashion
- Website: peopletree.com

Fair Trade Company KK
- Type: Limited
- Industry: Clothing, home wares and food design, distribution and retailing
- Founded: 1991
- Founders: Safia Minney, James Minney
- Headquarters: Tokyo, Japan
- Area served: Japan
- Key people: James Minney (CEO), Hana Sim (trademark owner)
- Products: Clothing, fashion
- Website: peopletree.co.jp

People Tree Ltd.
- Type: Private
- Industry: Clothing, and home wares design, distribution and retailing
- Founded: 1994
- Founders: Safia Minney, James Minney
- Defunct: October 18, 2023
- Fate: Entered liquidation due to bankruptcy
- Headquarters: London, United Kingdom
- Area served: United Kingdom; Europe; United States; Japan; Australia; New Zealand; Scandinavia
- Key people: James Minney (CEO)
- Products: Clothing, fashion
- Owner: People Tree Fair Trade Group Ltd (100%)
- Website: peopletree.co.uk; peopletree.eu; peopletree.de; peopletree.fr

People Tree is the trading or legal name of a number of current and former fair trade apparel, home wares and food businesses, starting with Fair Trade Company KK founded in Japan in 1991, (trading in Japan under the name People Tree or ピープルツリー in Japanese) and People Tree Ltd founded in the UK in 1994.

In 2007, the businesses were organised into a group under People Tree Fair Trade Group Ltd, United Kingdom (UK). The group formerly also included People Tree International Ltd (UK), People Tree Foundation (a UK charity), and People Tree Enterprises BV (Netherlands).

People Tree was one of the early proponents of fair trade and ethical fashion and was the first fashion company to be awarded the World Fair Trade Organization (WFTO) Fair Trade product label. People Tree Ltd was, prior to bankruptcy, a WFTO member. Fair Trade Company KK remains a member.

The group laid off all UK and European staff in 2023, amid financial trouble, and continued its founding company in Tokyo. People Tree Ltd, the UK trading business, went into liquidation in September 2023, with debts of £8.5 million, of which £4.8M were debts to directors and to other group companies, whilst £1.9M were debts to trade creditors including Fair Trade producers in developing countries.

People Tree businesses no longer own the trademarks to the name "People Tree" - see § Trademarks

In March 2025, Fair Trade Company KK transferred its profitable People Tree food business into a new entity, People Seed Co, a wholly-owned subsidiary of AiiA Corporation without any ownership remaining within the People Tree businesses. Fair Trade Company KK stated they had granted permission to People Seed for the use of the People Tree trademark, despite the People Tree Japanese trademark no longer belonging to Fair Trade Company KK or any People Tree business as of October 2024.

People Tree businesses have been funded primarily by commercial lenders including Johnan Shinkin Bank,, Sumitomo Mitsui Banking Corporation, Shoko Chukin Bank, Kansai Mirai Bank, Mitsubishi UFJ Financial Group, Oikocredit Ecumenical Development Cooperative Society, Shared Interest Society together with non-bank lenders such as Stella Bernrain and a variety of corporate and individual bondholders - many of whom lost their investments in 2023.

== History ==
=== Early years ===
The People Tree business developed from Global Village, an environmental campaigning non-governmental organization (NGO) founded by British born Safia Minney in Tokyo in 1991. It began as a clothing catalogue which featured hand woven and natural dyed hand bags, clothing, and clogs made by women from Bangladesh. Because it was difficult to find fair trade apparel products of a high enough quality for the Japanese market, Global Village started to do its own design in house. Safia Minney said, "When I started out [...] we were investing in labour-intensive process while the industry was going in the other direction: mass-manufactured fashion, using synthetics instead of natural materials. We were dealing with very disadvantaged people in remote places."

Initially the Global Village business was run from the home of Safia Minney, and her then-husband James Minney, also her business partner in founding People Tree. In 1995, Fair Trade Company KK was formed as a limited company in Japan by transferring the fair trading activity of Global Village, and a shop was opened in the fashionable Jiyūgaoka district, in Tokyo. In 1997, Safia Minney added a Fair Trade Fashion Collection, using eco-textiles, including organic cotton, to the products sold by Fair Trade Company. People Tree was working closely with textile artisan groups to help them meet environmental standards and develop their market potential, with two full-time designers.

In 2005, People Tree Japan launched its first 'prototype franchise' store in Tokyo.

=== British Expansion ===
In 2000, People Tree's business expanded to the UK where the brand formed a partnership with The Co-operative Group. In 2006, then-chief executive officer (CEO), Safia Minney persuaded Topshop executives to take People Tree into Topshop as a concession.

=== Recent History ===
By 2004, the UK company was selling to 20 different countries and turned over $1.79 million.

In 2015, founder and CEO, Safia Minney, left the business and separated from her husband James Minney, who was the chief financial officer (CFO).

In 2021 an e-commerce was launched as 'the new home of People Tree in Europe'. Since 2023, it has not had staff in the European Union (EU).

As of 2021, James Minney was CEO of People Tree.

In August 2023, People Tree Ltd laid off the majority of UK staff. CEO James Minney set out the problem in stark form:

"We are figuring out what is the right way to go forward and how we can build up from this minimal base to restart"

In September 2023, People Tree Ltd entered liquidation. People Tree Foundation Ltd and People Tree International Ltd were dissolved.

In March 2025, Fair Trade Company KK transferred its profitable food business to People Seed Co, a wholly-owned subsidiary of AiiA Corporation.

As of 14 August 2025, People Tree Fair Trade Group Ltd has applied to be struck-off from Companies House, the UK company register, the application signed by the companies three directors: James Minney, Richard Minney, and CJ Wilson.

=== Trademarks ===
In 2024-25, People Tree Fair Trade Group Ltd transferred its Japan, UK, Chinese, European, United States, South Korean and Taiwanese trademarks into the personal ownership of Hana Sim, CEO James Minney's current wife. People Tree Fair Trade Group Ltd allowed its Hong Kong and Australian trademarks to lapse due to non-payment of fees in 2024.

== Products ==
People Tree designs, manufactures, and markets its own label. It implemented the first supply chain for organic cotton and was the first organization in the world to achieve Global Organic Textile Standard (GOTS) certification for a supply chain located in the developing world. In the past it has worked in collaboration with designers like Orla Kiely and Bora Aksu, as well as London's Victoria and Albert Museum. People Tree is sold in 500 stores around the world including ASOS.com. The company also runs its own e-commerce business.
