= Fully fashioned knitting =

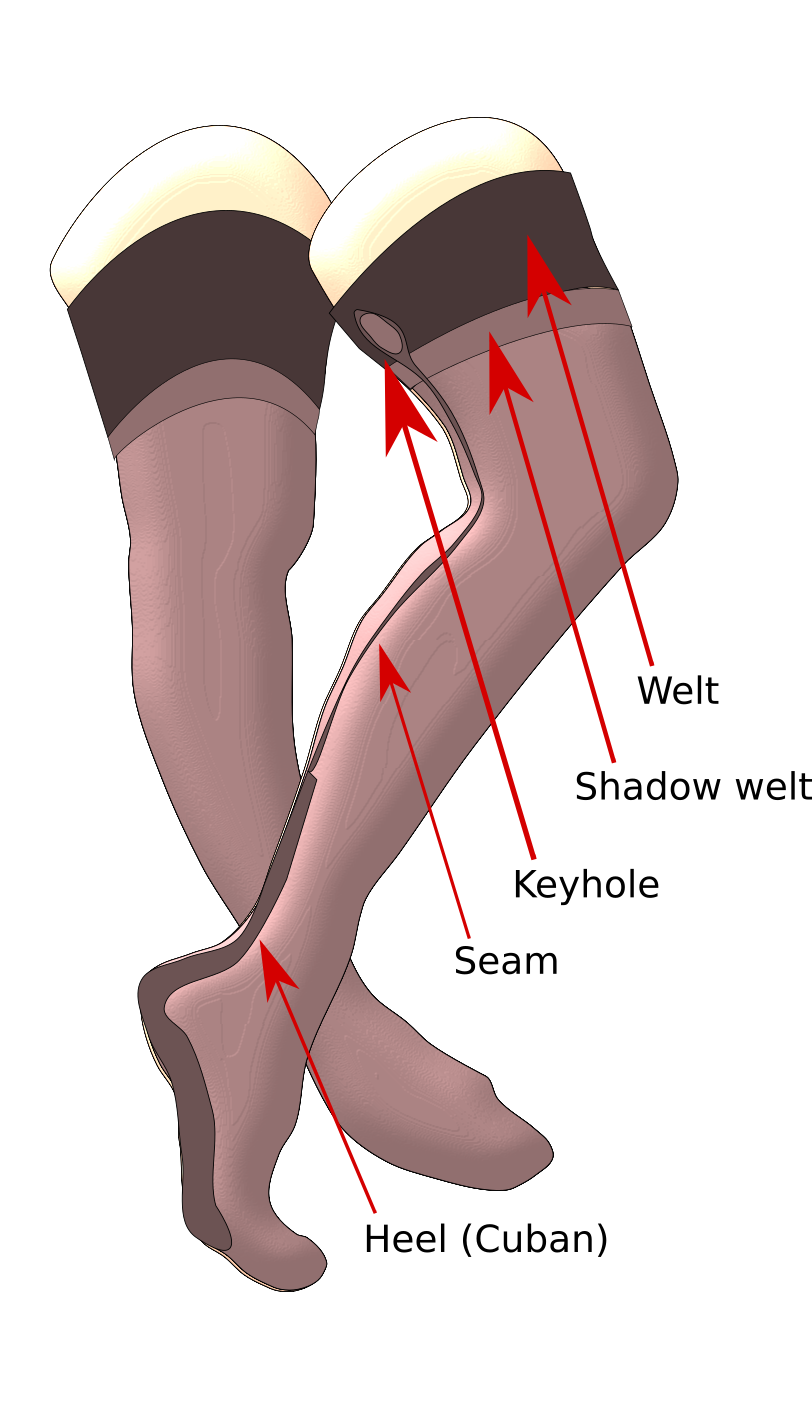
Fully fashioned stockings

Fully fashioned knitting machines are those warp knitting knitting machines which can shape a fabric by adding and reducing stitches. This method of shaping improves the fit of an article. Two types of warp knitting machines are in use, with different needles and mechanisms. Tricot machines produce fabric that is close-knit and smooth, good for close fitting garments, while Raschel machines are good for more structured garments.

Flat knitting machines are those machines which produce flat fabric of even width or by increasing or decreasing the number of stitches in the rows, flat but shaped pieces of fabric to be subsequently made up by sewing. Flat machines include machines for ordinary (weft) knitting and warp knitting.
