= Green textile =

Textiles or fibers produced sustainably

Green textiles are fabrics or fibres produced to replace environmentally harmful textiles and minimise the ecological impact. Green textiles (or eco-textiles) are part of the sustainable fashion and eco-friendly trends, providing alternatives to the otherwise pollution-heavy products of conventional textile industry, which is deemed the most ecologically damaging industry.

Green textiles may also refer to clothing or accessories designed to use organic or recycled materials, less packaging and more energy-efficient manufacturing.

== Types of green textiles ==
=== Silk ===
Silk is a traditional textile material made up of silk fibroin and sericin. The two materials in silk typically require prior separation before the silk can be further processed for clothing. Traditional textile methods involve soap, alkali, or both to degum textile silk. Ultrasonic degumming is a greener degumming process that is being researched. It includes degumming via sonification, which controls the rapid sol-gel transition of silk fibroin to form a hydrogel, regulating the protein structure to obtain protein-based materials.

=== Hemp ===
Hemp (Cannabis sativa) is a material used to produce fabrics at a lower cost than synthetic polymers. Hemp fibers are composed of cellulose, hemicellulose, pectin, lignin, and ester wax. The presence of cellulose allows hemp to have good water absorbency, comfort, and stability during textile processing. Ongoing research is being done on the incorporation of natural pomegranate extract into hemp fabrics to improve their dyeability and antibacterial properties.

=== Lyocell ===
Lyocell is a light cellulose fiber that is created by dissolving wood pulp. There are three general approaches to creating lyocell: physical blending, chemical reaction, and post-treatment. Lyocell is favoured, rather than its predecessor, viscose fibre, because lyocell's manufacturing process does not involve volatile and odorous carbon disulfide. Lyocell is 50% more absorbent than traditional cotton and requires less energy and water to produce, i.e. the chemicals used to produce the fibers are managed in a closed-loop system.

== Synthesis of green textiles ==
=== Via Nanoparticles ===
Green textiles are treated with green-synthesized nanoparticles. Nanoparticles are considered to be easy to synthesize, eco-friendly, and biocompatible in nature. Since textiles are host materials for the development of microbial infections, there is a need for antimicrobial clothing. Coating textile surfaces using nanoparticles or in-situ synthesis of nanoparticles with fabrics is an emerging tactic in yielding highly-finished green textiles.

Types of Nanoparticles

1. Silver Nanoparticles

Silver nanoparticles, also known as Nano Silver, are commonly used in biomedical fields due to their outstanding antimicrobial nature. They are also applicable in textiles, cosmetics, electronics, paints, the food industry, and medicinal fields. Nano Silver is synthesized by polysaccharides extracted from different marine macroalgae (Colpomenia sinuosa, Jania rubins, Pterocladia capillacae, and Ulva fasciata). Clusters of silver-poly(acrylates) can be synthesized via the reduction of silver nitrate. Nano Silver is the most common nanoparticle used in green textiles. It is a natural antimicrobial agent that acts as a catalyst for deactivating fungi, viruses, and bacteria required for oxygen intake. It also does not harm the human body's chemistry.

2. Gold Nanoparticles

Gold particles, called Collodial gold when dispersed in water, are used in the textile industry. Particle diameter varies from 1 to 100 nm. Textile functionalization using gold nanoparticles has improved in recent years. Green synthesis of gold nanoparticles is performed on cotton fabrics by in-situ synthesis for functionalization, popularized for cellulose material. It is treated by washing cotton fabric with HAuCl4 aqueous solutions in various concentrations. Gold particles were revealed with effective reduction of 4-nitrophenol by using sodium borohydride. Cotton fabrics treated with gold nanoparticles resulted in improved antibacterial activity, UV-blocking ability of the fabric, and improved Raman signs of dyes on fabric.

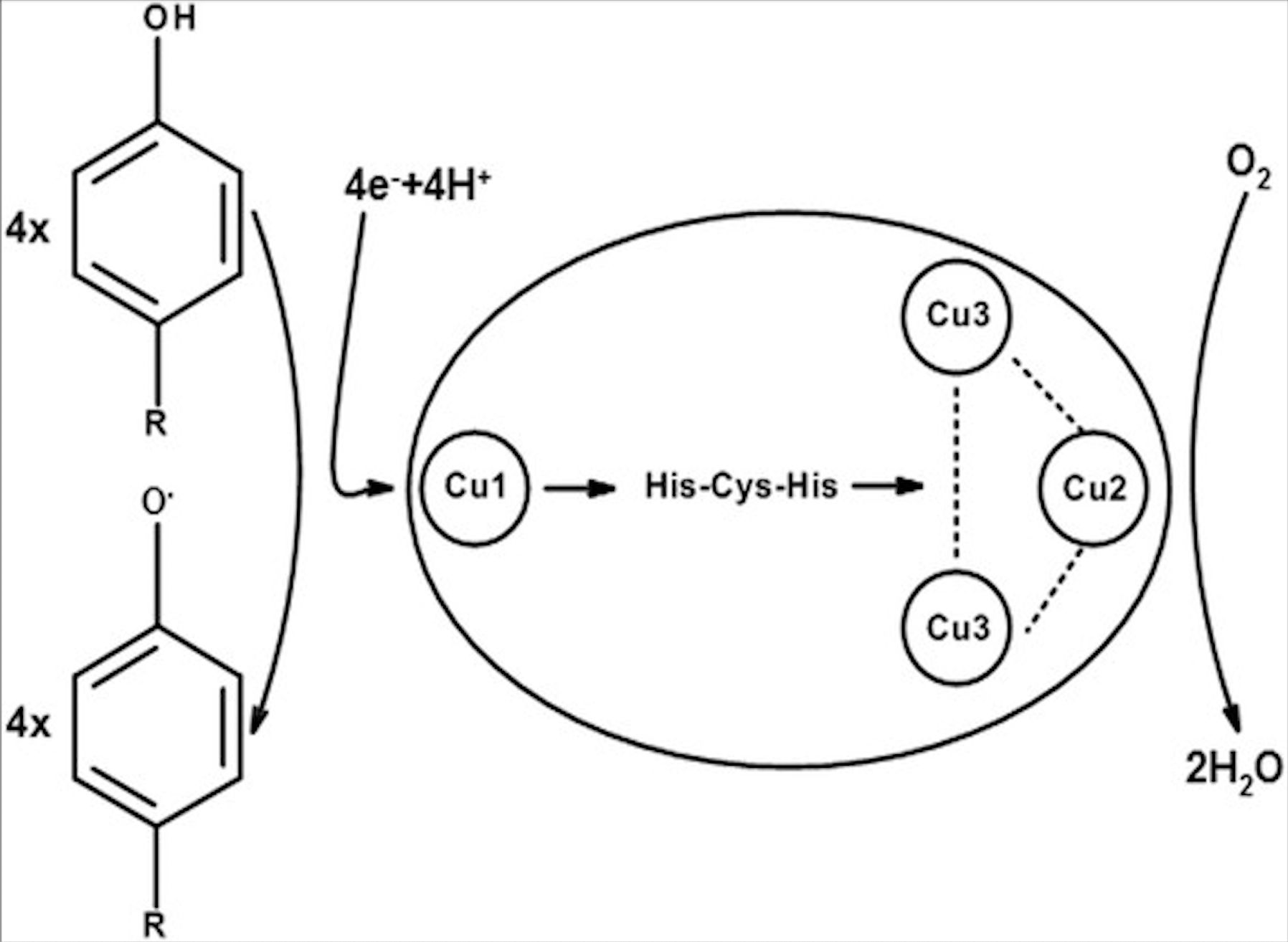
Schematic Diagram of Laccase-Catalyzed Oxidation

=== Via Laccase (Textile-dyeing) ===
Laccase is a multi-copper oxidase that catalyzes the oxidation of one electron of a wide range of phenolic and non-phenolic compounds to radical forms. The enzyme requires a molecule of oxygen as a co-substrate for catalysis and yields water as the sole by-product. Laccase-catalyzed synthesis of dye molecules represents a greener choice to reduce the environmental footprint of conventional synthesis processes. Laccase is considered to meet the textile industry's needs in terms of productivity, as it has proven to efficiently color nylon and wool fibers. Laccase has also proven to be difficult in keeping a low purity and homogeneity of the produced dyes.

== Uses and Applications ==
=== Green chemistry in wet processing of textiles ===
Wet processing is the treatment of textile substrates with colorants and chemicals. In conventional wet processing of textiles, excessive amounts of toxic and hazardous chemicals are utilized, and extremely large amounts of water are consumed.

Introduction of new bi- and multi-functional reactive dyes have significantly reduced energy and water consumption by at least half. This is caused by its enhanced properties in dye exhaustion, allowing for lower temperature conditions to be used.

Discovery of biodegradable dyes with improved fixation qualities. Alternative dye options such as pre-reduced sulfur and water-insoluble dyes that do not require reducing agents have made dyeing processes much more eco-friendly. Green reducing agents such as sugar-based reducing agents are commonly used to replace non-eco-friendly reducing agents like sodium sulfite.

Ionic liquids have been used as green solvents in making wet processing more sustainable. Research established that non-aqueous solvents could potentially replace water consumption in wet processing. This results in saving energy through indirect decrease in the usage of water. Ionic liquids possess high dissolving properties, are non-volatile, and have low vapor pressure which labels them as recoverable green solvents that produce no emissions and are eco-toxic.

== Impacts ==
=== Reduction of water pollution ===
Via Neutralization

Neutralization is the primary treatment where the suspended solids are eliminated via the technique of sedimentation, flotation, flocculation, and coagulation.

Anaerobic Bacteria

The secondary treatment process is to utilize anaerobic bacteria, and microorganisms, on the surface of sewage waters. The role of this bacteria is to reduce the amount of sludge and the ability to produce methane gas. This in turn can be used as an alternative energy source. An additional advantage to this treatment is that phosphorus can be removed as well.

Oxidation

The tertiary treatment for water pollution is through the use of redox reactions. Using redox reactions, chemical oxidation can be used to remove the color and odor, organic and inorganic compounds from wastewater. This is treated using specific ranges of pH to precipitate. Carbon oxidation can also be utilized. By using activated carbons from a range of commercial carbon-based porous-material, organic micropollutants can be removed from wastewater. The benefit is that it does not generate oxidation byproducts, thus different from a usual oxidation process.

== See also ==
- Environmental impact of fashion
- Green chemistry
- Water pollution
