= Safia Minney =

English businesswoman, author

Safia Minney MBE FRSA
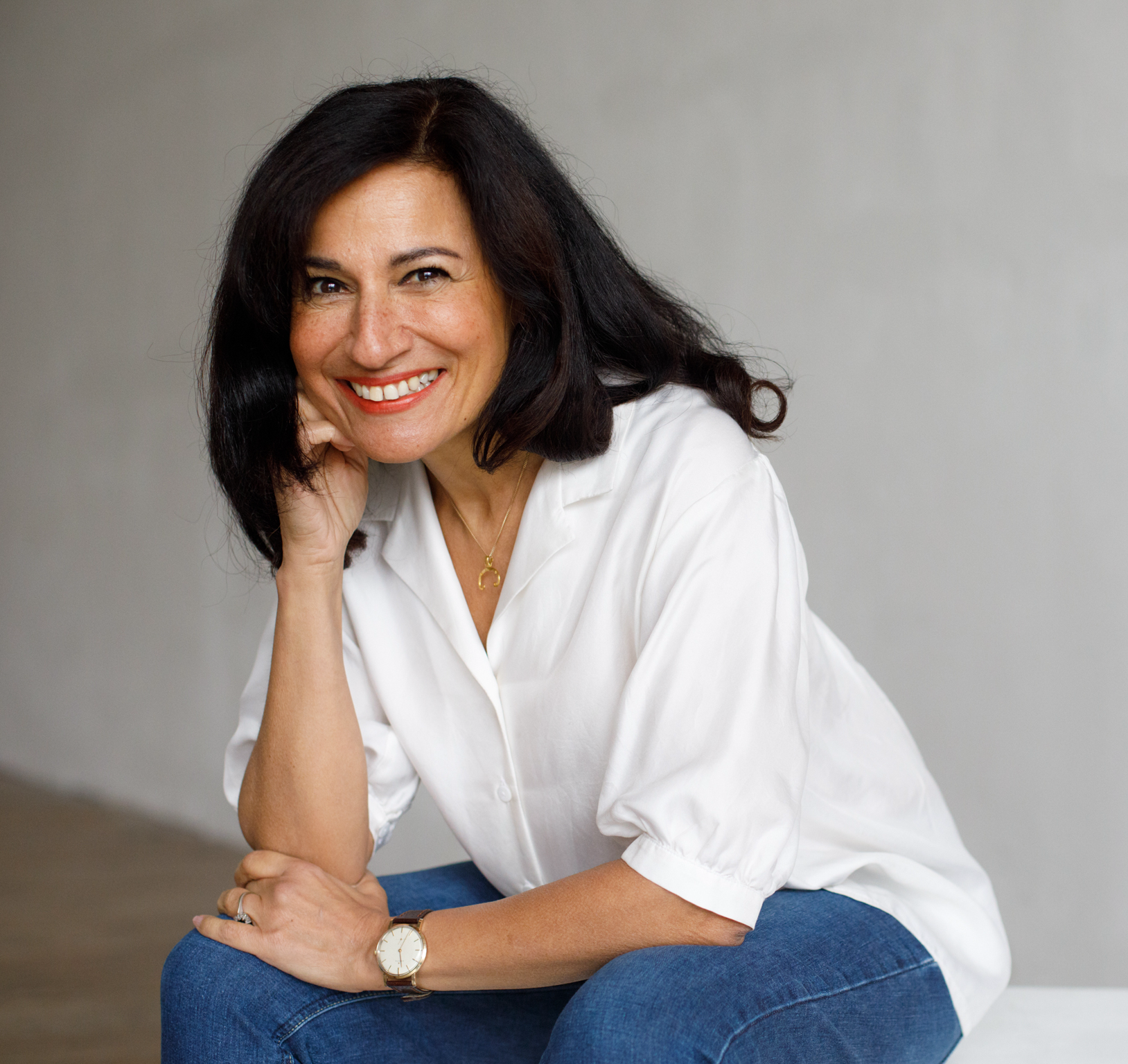
- Minney in 2017
- Born: 1964 (age 61–62)
- Occupations: Social entrepreneur, speaker, author

Safia Minney (born 1964) is a British social entrepreneur and author who was the founder of Global Village, which she set up in 1991, and the founder and former Global CEO of People Tree, a sustainable and Fair Trade fashion label. She is a spokesperson and campaigner on Fair Trade and ethical fashion. She initiated World Fair Trade Day in 1999, which is endorsed by the World Fair Trade Organization and their members and celebrated on the second Saturday of May each year.

Minney wrote the books Naked Fashion: the New Sustainable Fashion Revolution, Slow Fashion, Aesthetics Meets Ethics, Slave to Fashion and Regenerative Fashion.

== Early life ==
Minney was born in Britain in 1964 to a Swiss mother and Indo-Mauritian father.

== Career ==
=== Early work ===
Minney started her career in marketing and publishing. She worked for Creative Review magazine for four years and created her own social marketing consultancy working with magazine New Statesman and environmental organization Friends of the Earth. In 1990, Minney moved to Tokyo with her husband where she learnt Japanese before working for a publishing company, Amnesty International, and the Body Shop.

== Fair trade work ==
In 1991, Minney founded Global Village, a non-governmental trading organization in Japan. She began working with two students from Yokohama University, initially publishing a free leaflet that provided consumers with environmental and organic information and listings, and later also selling fair trade products.

In 1995, Fair Trade Company was formed as a limited company in Japan by transferring the fair trading activity of Global Village. A shop was opened in the Jiyugaoka district of Tokyo and in 1996 the business became a member of the World Fair Trade Organization.

In 2000, People Tree was launched by Fair Trade Company in London to establish fair trade fashion in Europe. In 2014, People Tree became the first company to be awarded the World Fair Trade Organisation Fair Trade product label with an international sales turnover of £8m. During her time at People Tree, Minney worked with designers, celebrities and influencers, including Emma Watson, Dame Zandra Rhodes, and Bora Aksu.

Minney left People Tree as Global CEO at the end of 2015 after separating from her husband James Minney, who was Chief Financial Officer. Following her departure, she spent some time as Managing Director of ethical shoe brand Pozu.
