= Complete garment knitting =

Complete garment knitting is a next-generation form of fully fashioned knitting that adds the capability of making a 3-dimensional full garment. Unlike other fully fashioned knitting, where the shaped pieces must still be sewn together, finished complete knitted garments do not have seams. The knitting machines' computerized instructions direct movement of hundreds of needles to construct and connect several tubular knitted forms to create a complete garment in a single production step.

The complete garment system's advantages lie in 1) a further reduction in materials beyond even fully fashioned production by eliminating seam allowances and 2) faster time to market by eliminating the need for sewing any components. These factors increases cost-effectiveness (especially important when using high-performance materials such as aramids for composites). One might also argue that cutting down on wasted by-product selvage makes complete garment better for the environment.

Two companies manufacture complete garment knitting machines: Shima Seiki and Stoll.

Examples of structures that are most often made with the complete garment technique are clothing (sportswear to sweaters) or technical textiles (car seat covers which also incorporate additional structural elements such as metal and plastic fasteners, composite preforms). The machines can produce a variety of topologies that were more difficult or impossible to create with knitting machines before, including: connected tubes, circles, open cuboids, and even spheres (for helmet shells and other preforms).

Complete garment knitting requires two needle beds for three-dimensional structures (such as clothing). As is the case with all fully fashioned knitting, machines require individual single needle selection (through electronic control) and presser feet (to hold down formed loops).

Note: Aspects of complete garment knitting such as changing the fabric width or diameter and connecting two sides of the structure together are also possible with a single needle bed for two-dimensional or 'flat' structures—and are achieved by:

1. Changing knit structure (e.g. rib to interlock)
2. Varying the structural elements (stitch length, weft insertion, knit, tuck, float)
3. Shaping through loop transfer
4. Wale fashioning by 'needle parking'
5. Segmented takedown for varying rates of takedown across the width of the fabric
