= Sally Fox (inventor) =

American inventor

- Born: 1955 (age 70–71); Palo Alto, California
- Education: California State Polytechnic University; University of California at Riverside (MBA)
- Known for: FoxFibre

Sally Fox (born 1955) is a United States cotton breeder who breeds naturally colored varieties of cotton. She is the inventor of Foxfibre and founder of the company Natural Cotton Colors. Fox invented the first species of environmentally friendly colored cotton that could be spun into thread on a machine.

Fox has been called a "cotton pioneer" for her efforts regarding organic, colored cotton and heirloom wheat.

== Early life and education ==
Fox was the sixth of seven children, born in 1955 in Woodside, California to two real estate agents. At the age of seven, her family moved to Menlo Park.

Fox first became interested in cotton fibers at the age of 12. After purchasing her first spindle with babysitting money, she created various threads from household objects such as dog hair and linen.

In high school, an entomology teacher and then Stanford Ph.D. student, Elizabeth Wangari, inspired Fox to take an interest in insects. Wangari helped Fox secure an internship at Zoecon Corporation in Palo-Alto. Fox went on to major in biology and entomology at California State Polytechnic University at San Luis Obispo.

After graduation, Fox joined the Peace Corps and travelled to The Gambia, West Africa in order to learn about the environmental factors harming local rice and peanut crops. It was here that Fox was first exposed, both socially and physically, to the dangers of pesticides such as DDT. Fox taught safety classes regarding the usage of pesticides but was forced to return home after becoming very sick (due to exposure). After her stint in the Peace Corps, Fox furthered her education by earning a master's degree in integrated pest management from the University of California at Riverside.

=== Inspiration to grow colored cotton ===
In the early 1980s, Fox began looking for a job. However, the 1980s farm crisis during this time period created a sparse job market. Fox first found work as a pollinator for a cotton breeder in California. During this job, Fox discovered a bag of seeds that produced brown, pest-resistant cotton. After a suggestion from her employer, Fox spun out the cotton and left her job so as to plant her first fields of naturally colored cotton.

== Natural Cotton Colors Inc. ==
Fox is the founder and owner of the company Natural Cotton Colors Inc. Fox's breakthrough occurred in 1988 at Texas Tech University when she successfully produced her first species of naturally colored cotton that could be spun on a machine. After a sale with a Japanese textile mill, Fox quit her job at Sandoz Crop Protection and founded Natural Cotton Colors Inc., setting up base in Wasco, California.

Fox's second major sale occurred in 1989, when she sold 122 bushels of cotton to a different Japanese mill for $279,000. Following these sales, Fox obtained Plant Variety Protection Certificates (the equivalent of patents for plants) and trademarked her cotton brand: FoxFibre. Not long after, L.L. Bean and Land's End put in significant orders for FoxFibre. Fox's business, Natural Cotton Colors, soon became a company/business worth $10 million.

However, Sally Fox and FoxFibre faced many obstacles in order to produce their cotton. Southern California cotton growers, who feared the crop would contaminate their own produce, pushed for re-enforcement of early 20th-century legislation that placed strict laws on Fox's growing process and her fields. In 1993, she relocated to Arizona. But in 1999, Arizona cotton growers pushed for similar laws on Fox's fields, causing Fox to relocate once again, this time to Northern California. The company faced further barriers when, between 1990 and 1995, a majority of the spinning mills in Europe, Japan and the United States closed down, possibly caused by increased globalization and industrialization.

=== FoxFibre ===
FoxFibre is the patented name of Fox's various breeds of naturally colored, organically grown cotton. Different colors available for textile industries, including Redwood, Coyote, New Green, and Buffalo.

Fox herself weeded, maintained, and grew cotton, each year harvesting and breeding only the best in color and in fiber. Fox even crossbred her brown cotton with traditional white cotton so as to produce crops with longer, stronger fibers for threading. Each color of cotton takes approximately ten years of cross-breeding before it can be sold on the market. Her work mirrors, and pushed for more innovation in, the scientific field of genetic engineering.

== Legacy ==
While Fox was not the first person to invent nor harvest naturally colored cotton, she was the first to invent a species of naturally colored cotton that could be spun into thread via machine. Naturally colored cotton has short, weak fibers that traditionally required hours upon hours of expensive hand threading. White cotton has stronger, longer fibers that are able to be threaded by a machine. However, the bleaching process of the white cotton is not environmentally friendly, creating large amounts of pollution as a byproduct. Fox's cotton was a gateway for the textile industry to see how good quality clothes could be made while prioritizing the health of the environment. Furthermore, Fox grows all her cotton without pesticides or chemical pesticides, further promoting and encouraging farmers and textile industries to grow environmentally friendly products.

Fox and her work has been featured in Civil Eats, Core77, the Sacramento Bee, and Popular Mechanics.

== Awards ==
- United Nations Programmed Award
- 1992, Edison Award for Environmental Achievement by the American Manufacturing Association
- Green Award from Green Housekeeping Magazine
- 1993, IFOAM - Organics International Organic Cotton Recognition Award
