= Milan Fashion Week =

Italian clothing trade show

Milan Fashion Week Settimana della moda di Milano
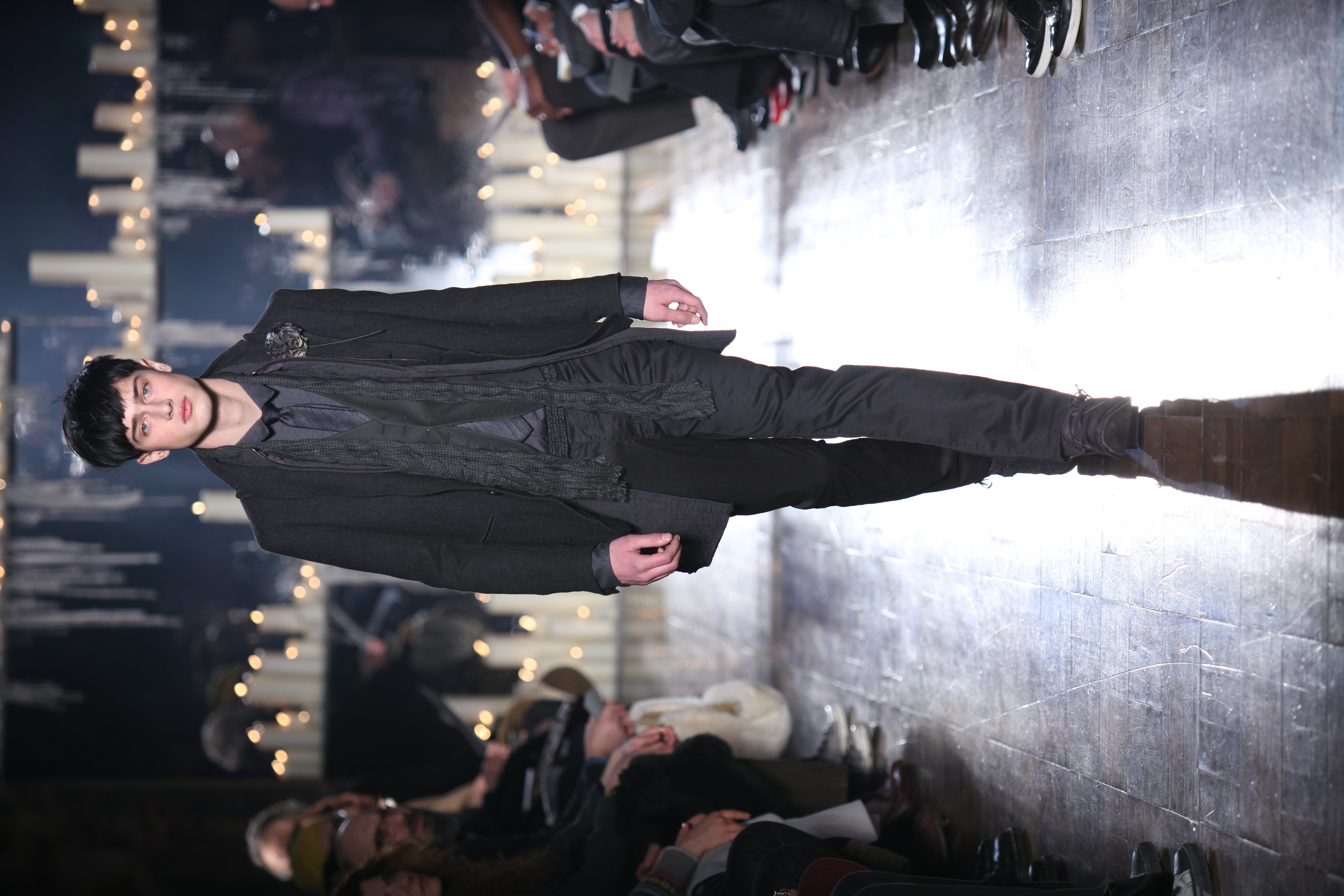
- A moment of the Milan Fashion Week in February 2010
- Genre: Clothing and fashion exhibitions
- Frequency: Semi-annually
- Locations: Milan, Italy
- Inaugurated: 1958
- Organiser: Camera Nazionale della Moda Italiana
- People: Maria Antonelli, Roberto Capucci, Princess Caracciolo Ginnetti, Alberto Fagiani, Giovanni Cesare Guidi, Germana Marucelli, Emilio Federico Schuberth, Simonetta Colonna Di Cesarò, Jole Veneziani, Francesco Borrello, Giovanni Battista Giorgini, Pietro Parisio.
- Website: www.cameramoda.it/en/

Milan Fashion Week (Italian: Settimana della moda di Milano) is a clothing trade show held semi-annually in Milan, Italy. Upcoming autumn/winter fashions are showcased in February/March of each year, and upcoming spring/summer fashions are showcased in September/October of each year. Many designers showcase new designs and upcoming collections. Milan Fashion Week is one of the "Big Four" global fashion weeks alongside New York, Paris, and London.

== History and operations ==
Milan Fashion Week, established in 1958, is part of the global "Big Four fashion weeks", the others being Paris Fashion Week, London Fashion Week, and New York Fashion Week. The schedule begins with New York, followed by London, and then Milan, and ending with Paris. Since the year 1958, Milan Fashion Week has been taking place semi-annually with a women's and a men’s fashion week.

Milan Fashion Week is partially organized by the National Chamber of Italian Fashion (Camera Nazionale della Moda Italiana), a non-profit association that disciplines, co-ordinates, and promotes the development of Italian fashion and is responsible for hosting the fashion events and shows of Milan. The Camera Sindacale della Moda Italiana, was set up on 11 June 1958. This was the forerunner of the body which subsequently became the Camera Nazionale della Moda Italiana.

Proprietors of the most important establishments in Italy, including some private establishments, which, in those days, played a crucial role in the promotion of this sector, were present at the Memorandum of Association: Roberto Capucci, Emilio Schuberth, Maria Antonelli, Princess Caracciolo Ginnetti, Alberto Fagiani, Giovanni Cesare Guidi, Germana Marucelli, Simonetta Colonna Di Cesarò, Jole Veneziani, Francesco Borrello, Giovanni Battista Giorgini, and the lawyer Pietro Parisio.

The events dedicated to women's fashion are the most important (Womenswear / Milan SS Women Ready to Wear, and Milano Moda Donna being the major fashion shows). The summer events dedicated to men include Menswear and Milano Moda Uomo.

In 2013, the Autumn/Winter Milan Fashion Week commenced on 20 January with Paola Frani's showcase. It was followed by presentations from renowned fashion houses including Armani, Bottega Veneta, Roberto Cavalli, Dolce & Gabbana, Etro, Fendi, Ferragamo, Gucci, Jil Sander, Marni, Max Mara, Missoni, Miu Miu, Moschino, Philipp Plein, Prada, Pucci, John Richmond, Tod's, Valentino, Versace and Zegna among others. The event also featured displays from emerging labels and young designers such as Au Jour Le Jour, Cristiano Burani, Gabriele Colangelo, Marco De Vincenzo, Stella Jean, Chicca Lualdi, MSGM, N°21, Fausto Puglisi, and Francesco Scognamiglio. Additionally, on 20 November 2013, Giorgio Armani made the announcement of his decision to join the Italian Chamber of Fashion.

In April 2015, Carlo Capasa was named president of the Camera Nazionale Della Moda Italiana succeeding former president Mario Boselli.

Certain shows are not held in conjunction with the Camera Nazionale Della Moda Italiana, including Dolce & Gabbana. The Camera Nazionale Della Moda Italiana has also been sharply criticized by designers such as Cavalli.

== 2020–2022: Milano Digital Fashion Weeks ==
Due to the COVID-19 pandemic, the 2020 edition took place only through digital media from 14 July to 17 July 2020. In 2022, Gucci made a debut at Milan Fashion Week, finding 68 pairs of twins to showcase their design.

== Locations ==
Milan Fashion Week includes more than 40 shows each season and transforms the city into a touristic hub by simply creating various venues for the shows selecting the most elegant and influential palaces to become the stage for design. Examples of locations are Palazzo Reale, Palazzo Serbelloni, and many others.

== Sustainability controversy ==
In 2014, Greenpeace protested to demand "toxic-free fashion" by hanging signs in the Galleria Vittorio Emanuele II. Chiara Campione of Greenpeace Italy said the demonstration was set up to "...ask Italian brands, especially Versace, because it has the highest level of hazardous chemicals in its products, to publicly commit to eliminate harmful substances from the various stages of production."

== Key revenues ==
In 2021, the following revenue was reported for Milan Fashion Week.

- Attendees / Visitors: 30,000
- Total Income: €64 million
- City Income: €15.5 million
- Business Income: €48.5 million
- Venue Income: €7 million
- Restaurant Income: €22 million
- Retail Income: €26 million
- Accommodation Income: €9 million
- Average Expenditure per Visitor: €1,902

== See also ==
- Berlin Fashion Week
- London Fashion Week
- New York Fashion Week
- Paris Fashion Week
- Shanghai Fashion Week
- São Paulo Fashion Week
