= Renato Balestra =

Italian fashion designer (1924–2022)

Renato Balestra OMRI
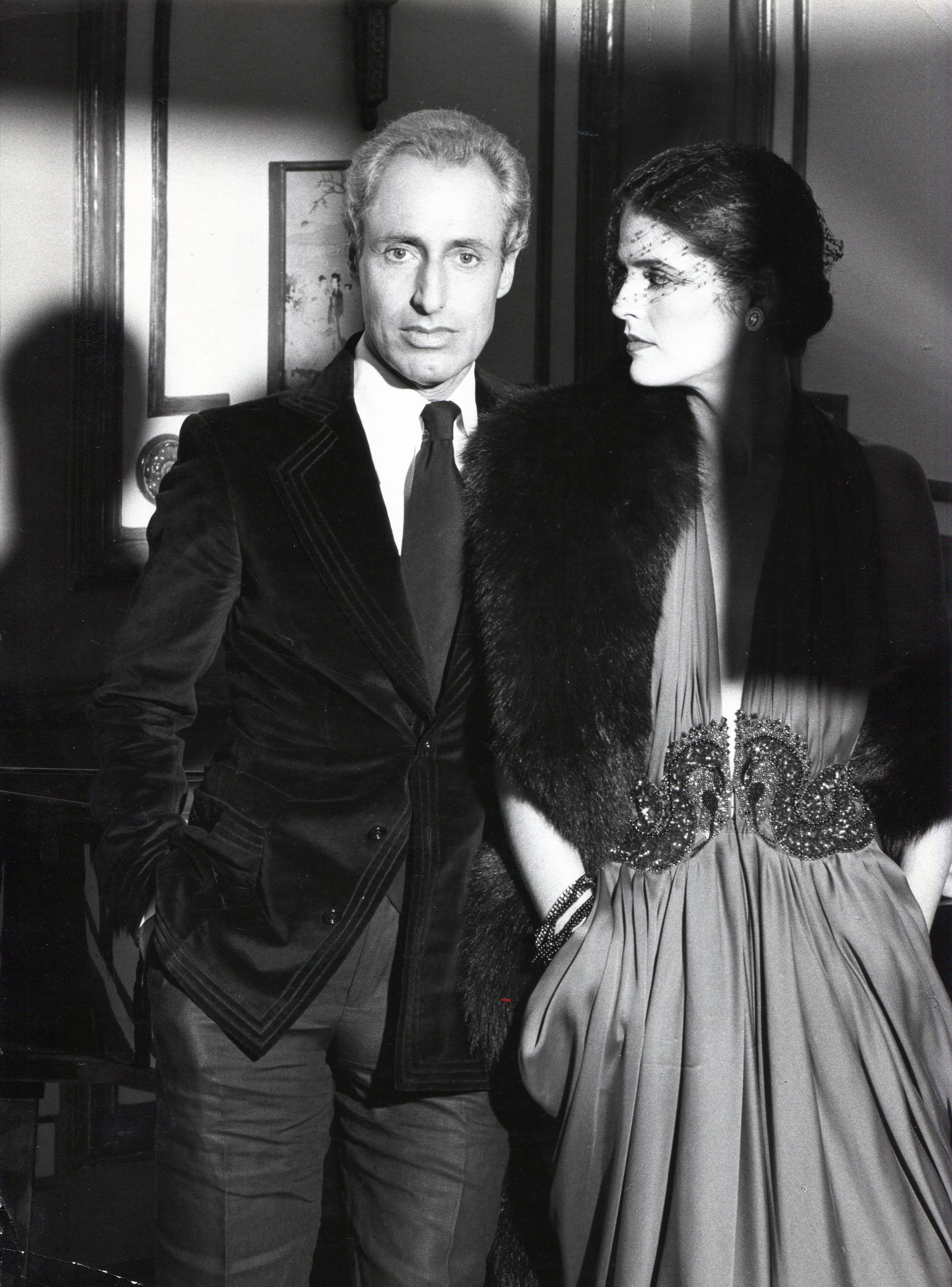
- Balestra in his atelier, 1978
- Born: Renato Balestra; 3 May 1924; Trieste, Kingdom of Italy
- Died: 26 November 2022 (aged 98); Rome, Italy
- Occupation: Fashion designer
- Years active: 1953–2022
- Label: Renato Balestra
- Children: Fabiana and Federica
- Awards: Grande ufficiale dell' Ordine al merito della Repubblica Italiana
- Website: balestraroma.com

Renato Balestra OMRI (3 May 1924 – 26 November 2022) was an Italian fashion designer, the founder of the Balestra brand and company.

== Life and career ==
=== Early life ===
Born in Trieste, Renato Balestra grew up immersed in the Mid-European cultural environment. In a family of architects and engineers, he stood out for his artistic spirit and explored painting, music and scenography in his free time.

His career in fashion began almost by chance, when friends sent one of his sketches to the Italian Fashion Center (Centro Italiano della Moda, CMI): immediately noticed for his talent, he was invited to take part in an Haute Couture show. By 1953, he had achieved such success that he quit his studies in engineering and completed his apprenticeship at Jole Veneziani's atelier.

Considered the "painter of fashion", he created a synergy with Italian Haute Couture, which he deeply transformed over the decades. By the 1970s, he was famous for his signature "Embroidery Painting", based on the original use of materials and actual painting on fabrics of any kind. His mastery of transparencies, through innovation and freedom of expression, spoke to modern, strong, and sensual women.

=== Rome ===
In 1954, he moved to Rome and began working as a designer for prestigious fashion houses such as Emilio Schuberth, Maria Antonelli, and the Sorelle Fontana. His strong passion for cinema led him to design costumes for Ava Gardner in The Barefoot Contessa and The Sun also Rises, for Gina Lollobrigida in Beautiful but Dangerous, for Sophia Loren in Lucky to Be a Woman, for Candice Bergen in The Adventurers, and for Shirley Jones, Micheline Presle, and Giorgia Moll in Dark Purpose.

=== Hollywood ===
As the international jet set noticed his talent more and more, in 1958 he began presenting his collections across the United States, from Los Angeles to New York City. He debuted in Hollywood with actresses such as Zsa Zsa Gabor, Tina Louise, Joan Bennett, Linda Christian, Natalie Wood, Ann Miller, and Arlene Dahl. Appreciated and loved not only for his designs but also for his optimism, he became a favorite of movie stars like Liz Taylor, Claudia Cardinale, Marina Cicogna, Lydia Alfonsi, Daniela Rocca, Yvonne Furneaux, Carroll Baker, Candice Bergen, and Cyd Charisse.

=== 1960s ===
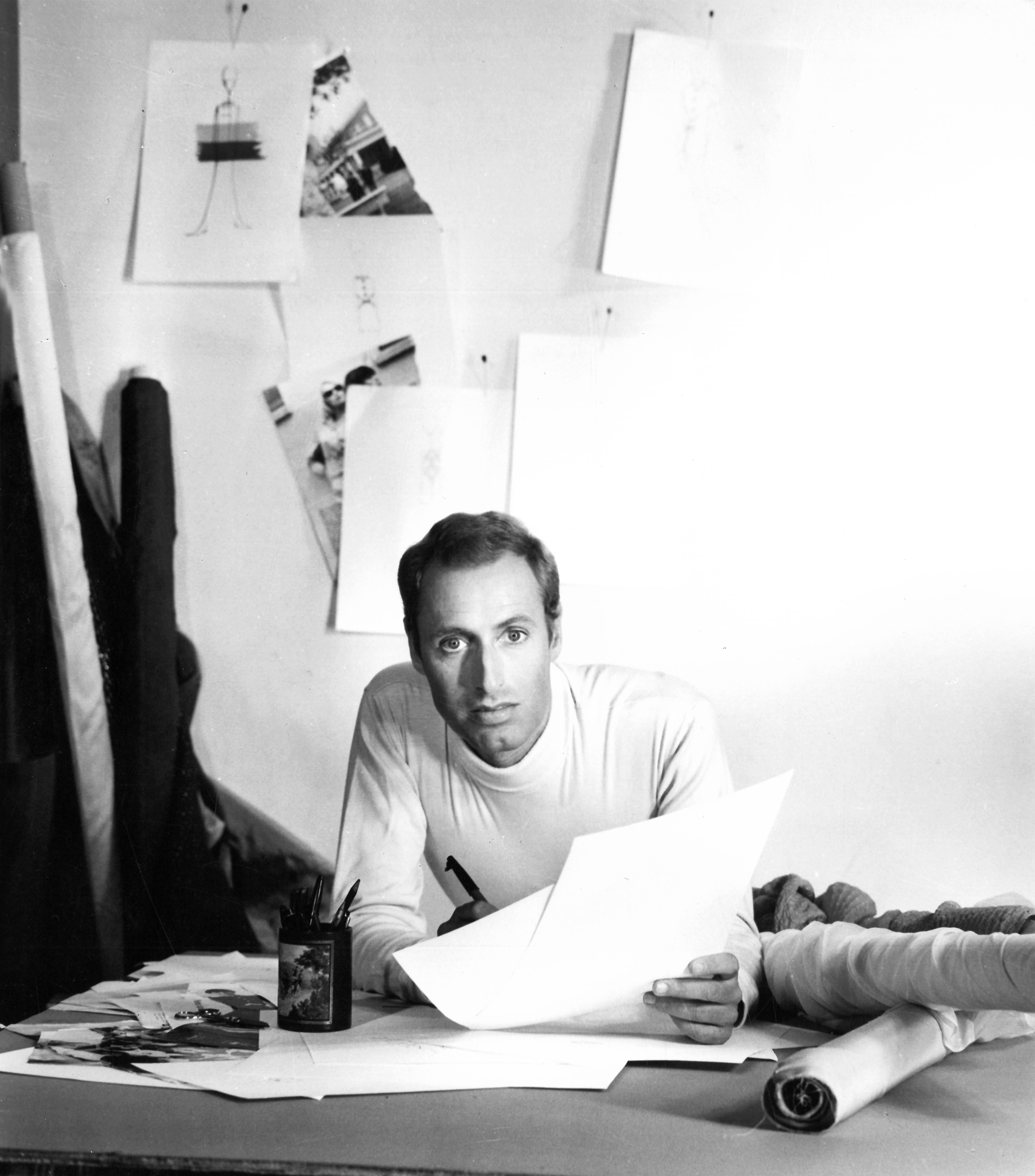
Renato Balestra portrait in his atelier in Rome at via Gregoriana 36.

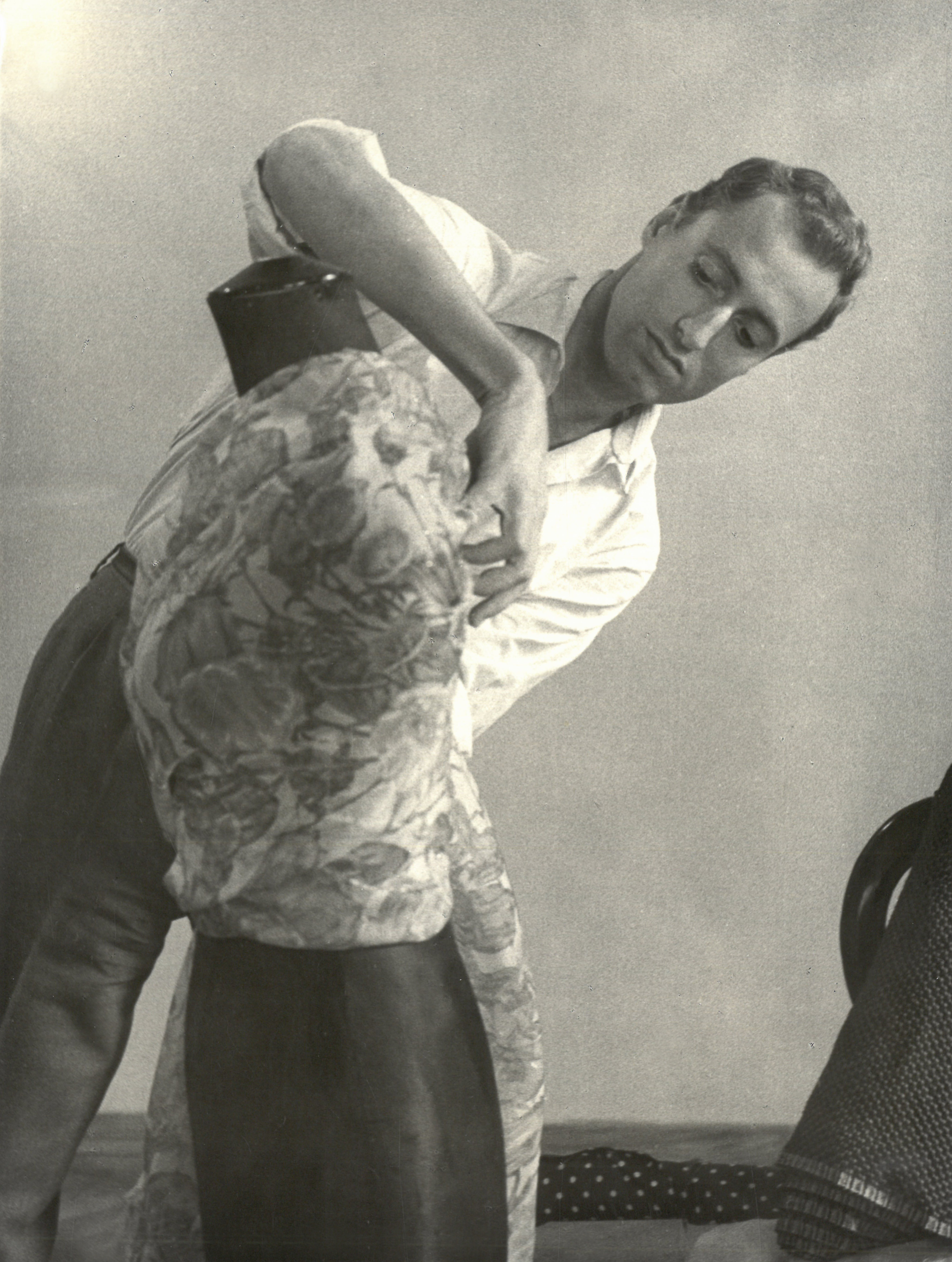
Renato Balestra in his Atelier in Rome.

In 1959, Balestra opened his first atelier in Rome at via Gregoriana 36. In 1961, he presented his first spring- summer haute couture collection at the Galleria Nazionale d'Arte Moderna. Those were the years when "Blu Balestra" first appeared, on a short satin dress: a bright, magical and timeless hue, a unique color that remains an indisputable symbol of the maison to this day.

In 1962, Balestra became a member of the National Chamber of Italian Fashion, and the Italian Trade Agency (ICE) chose him to promote Made in Italy quality around the world.

In January 1963, Balestra held his first show in Palazzo Pitti's Sala Bianca, launching a completely new concept of fashion that stood out for its simplicity, accuracy and spontaneity. He developed this new approach designing exclusive collections for Isetan in Tokyo as well as leading American department stores Saks Fifth Avenue, Bergdorf Goodman, Foley's, Neiman Marcus, and Lord & Taylor.

By the end of the 1960s, the Renato Balestra brand was distributed in over 70 American department stores and showcased on runways in the Philippines, Singapore, Thailand, Japan, Malaysia, Indonesia, the Middle East, and Far East. Soon, clients included the most powerful and elegant women in the world, from first ladies to princesses and empresses. Custom-made gowns and wedding dresses, highlighting various local cultures and materials, created a strong foundation for the designer's long-lasting career.

In 1973, the registration of the Renato Balestra brand was completed. As one of the first designers to believe in licensing, Balestra launched his namesake perfume in 1978 and went on to successfully explore and develop various products: not only fragrances, but also makeup, luggage, eyewear, and homeware.

=== Uniforms ===
His creativity enhanced further collaborations and flourished in skillfully executed uniforms for Philippines Airlines (1985), Alitalia Airlines (1986), and for the managers of the Agip Petroli factories (1988).

Balestra fashioned clothes for Farah Diba, Empress of Persia, for Imelda Marcos, first lady of the Philippines, and in 1985, in honor of Queen Sirikit of Thailand, he presented at the Mandarin Oriental in Bangkok the 1985 Spring/Summer collection made entirely in local mudmee silk. He dressed Saudi princesses and for Princess Noor bint Asem of Jordan on the occasion of her marriage to Prince Hamzah bin Hussein (2003) Balestra designed a unique wedding gown.

=== Opera costumes ===
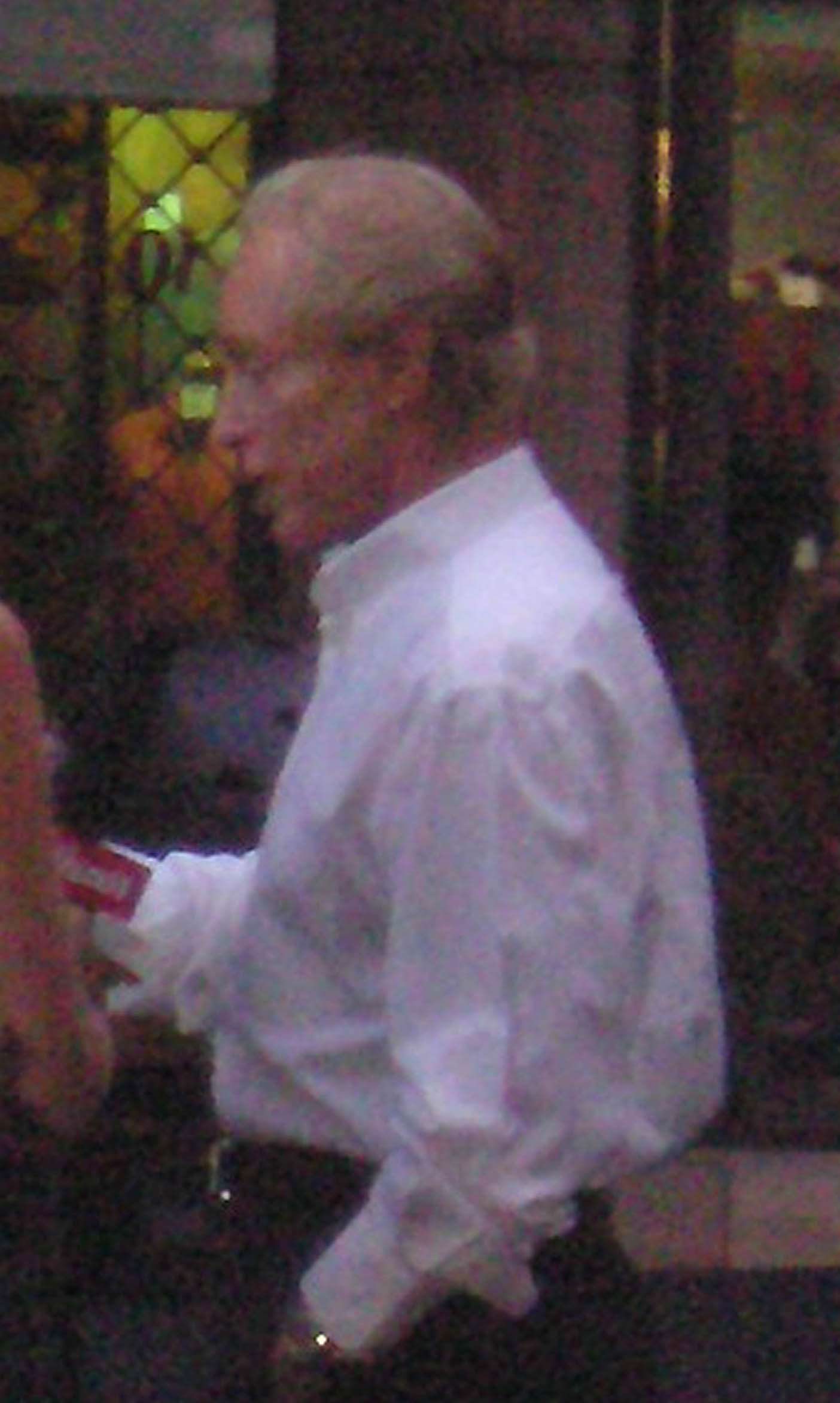
Renato Balestra, 2004

In 1988, he presented Rosa & Chic on Italian national TV Rai 2: it was the first time a fashion designer was entrusted with his own TV show. In 1991, he wrote his first book: Alla ricerca dello stile perduto (literally, In Search of Lost Style), published by Rusconi.

Balestra's interest in the arts – including theater – motivated him to design costumes for Cosi è (se vi pare) directed by Franco Zeffirelli (1985), Rossini's Cenerentola at the Belgrade Opera House (1988), and Strauss's The Rose-Bearer at the Verdi Theater in Trieste (for the opening of the 1999 opera season).

Balestra returned to design the costumes for the Cinderella musical produced by Broadway-Asia Entertainment, which went on a global tour from major Asian cities to America from 2009 to 2011. In 2019, he designed both the costumes and the scenography for Tchaikovsky's Swan Lake at the Belgrade Opera House.

=== Blu Balestra ===
Blu Balestra

Color coordinates
- Hex triplet: #000F9F
- sRGB^{B} (r, g, b): (0, 15, 159)
- HSV (h, s, v): (234°, 100%, 62%)
- CIELCh_{uv} (L, C, h): (19, 75, 265°)
- Source: https://balestraroma.com/it/
- B: Normalized to [0–255] (byte)

=== Special Projects ===
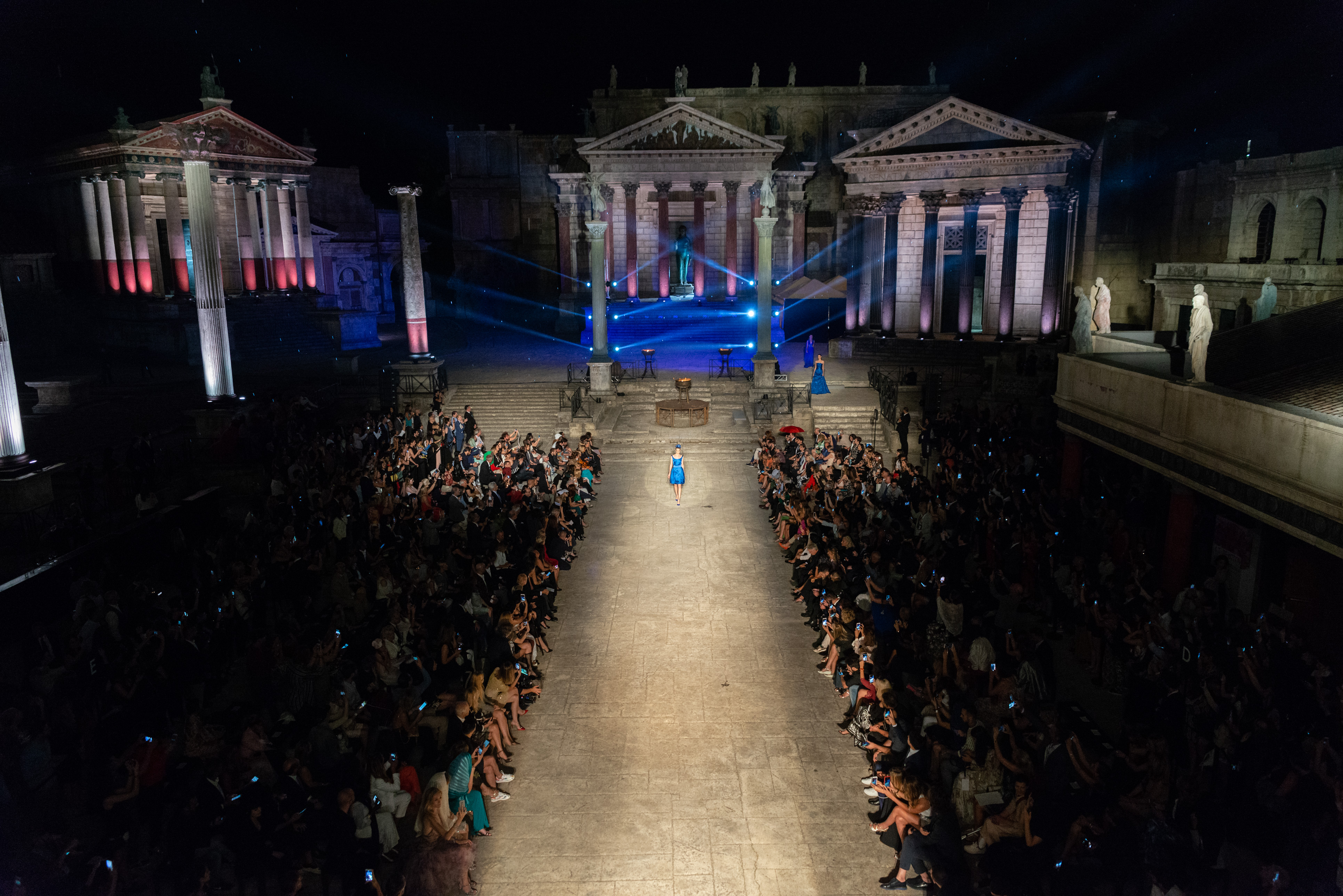
Balestra fashion show at Cinecittà in 2018

In 2013, his vision led him to launch a special project with AltaRoma for the new generation of fashion designers: Be Blu Be Balestra, a competition for young talents who reinterpret the iconic Blu Balestra under Balestra's personal guidance.

=== Career Celebration ===
In 2018, AltaRoma celebrated his career with an exceptional fashion show that showcased over 100 couture gowns from the Renato Balestra Archive in front of 2,500 guests.

=== Recognition ===
During his career, Balestra received prestigious awards in recognition of his talent: he was made Honorary Professor of the Beijing Fashion Academy; Italian President Giorgio Napolitano appointed him Grand Officer of the Order of Merit of the Italian Republic in 2009; and he was nominated International Couturier Extraordinaire by the Asian Couture Federation in Singapore.

=== The Archive ===
In 2019, Renato Balestra's archive was declared by the Ministry for Cultural Heritage and Activities (MiBAC) "of particularly important historical interest". It includes documentation produced from the mid-1950s to the present day, and is made up of over 40,000 sketches and drawings, clothes and tailoring, press reviews and photographs.

=== Personal life and death ===
Balestra died on 26 November 2022, at the age of 98.
