= Giovanni Battista Giorgini =

Italian entrepreneur

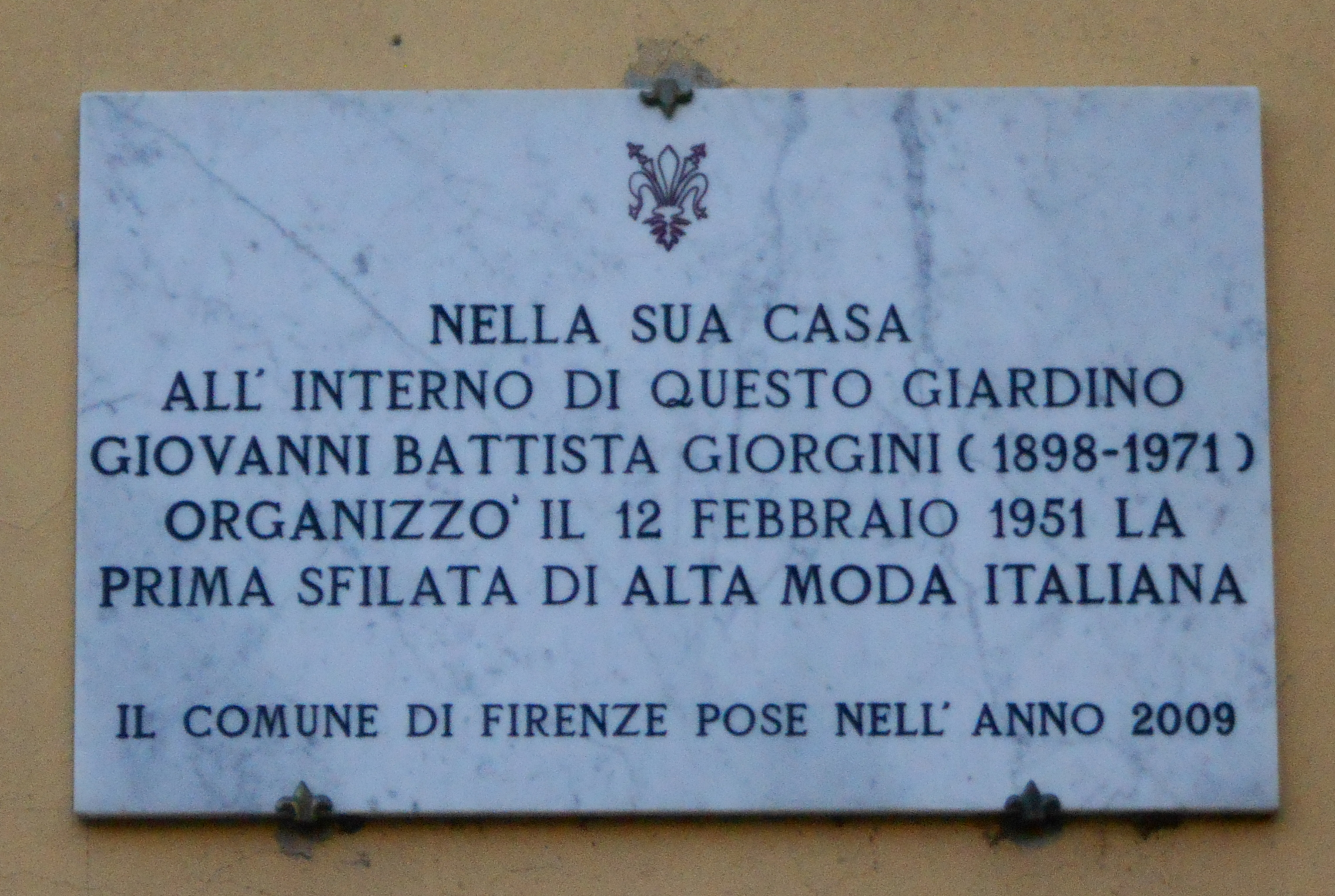
villa Torrigiani, via dei Serragli, Florence (Giardino Torrigiani) Translated from Italian: In his house inside this garden Giovanni Battista Giorgini (1898–1971) organized the first Italian Haute Couture Show on 12 February 1951. The municipality of Florence Posted in the year 2009.

Giovanni Battista Giorgini, nicknamed Bista (Forte dei Marmi, 25 August 1898 – Florence, 2 January 1971), was an Italian entrepreneur and member of the Giorgini family.

== Early life and family ==
Giovanni Battista Giorgini was a member of the Giorgini family, descending from a noble family from Lucca. His great-grandfather, Carlo, was a Deputy of the Kingdom of Italy; he was the brother-in-law of Vittoria Manzoni, the eighth daughter of the writer Alessandro Manzoni. His father, Vittorio Giorgini (1860–1919), helped his brother Alessandro in the family business in the marble trade. His mother, Florence Rochat (1860–1942) was Waldensian and originally from Francophone Switzerland. The boy grew up in a cultured and cosmopolitan environment, and he undertook classical studies at the University of Pisa with the intention of pursuing a diplomatic career.

At the age of 17, he followed in his family's footsteps and enrolled as a volunteer in the infantry to participate in the First World War. Shocked by the horrors of the war, he promoted the Christian Youth Association, equivalent to the evangelical organization YMCA. The untimely death of his father Vittorio in 1919 forced him to take care of the family businesses, ranging from marble to the shipping sector.

In 1921, he married Zaira Augusta Nanni, with whom he had three children: Graziella, Vittorio and Matilde. In the same year, he founded a branch of the Fasci di Combattimento in his home town of Forte dei Marmi, becoming its political secretary. In July of the same year, he participated in the Fatti di Sarzana and the following year in the Marcia su Roma.

== Career ==
In 1922, he moved to Florence, where, in 1923, he decided to start his own business by opening the "GB Giorgini & Co. Import-export" at 9 Calzaioli Street. He actively promoted Tuscan art, antiques and crafts, and in 1924 he made his first business trip to the United States. This trip was particularly difficult because at that time Italian exporters were not regarded well overseas. He decided to develop contacts with the "Italian House of Columbia University", "Italian American Society" and the YMCA, and at the same time, he selected Italian craftsmanship of the highest quality.

The crash of 1929 dealt a heavy blow to his work and forced him to close his New York office. Returning to Florence, Giorgini opened a shop on the Lungarno Acciaiuoli, "The Three Rooms", which offered exclusively Italian products. Due to financial difficulties, they had to move again in 1936 to a location down the street on the Lungarno Corsini that had extra rooms they rented to students of Smith College. The years that followed were very unstable until the end of the Second World War, when the Allies entrusted him with the management of the "Allied Forces Gift Shop" of Florence, a shop responsible for selling products to Anglo-American troops. In those years, he quickly got back in touch with all the Italian artisans with whom he had worked before the war, and of course with American buyers.

In the wake of the war, the skilled businessman immediately saw the potential of Italian fashion, which was then almost unknown in the world. Everything took place in Paris, where the few non-French designers opened their ateliers (Cristobal Balenciaga, Elsa Schiaparelli, etc.). Giovanni Battista Giorgini took the initiative to organize the "First Italian High Fashion Show" at his private residence in Florence at Villa Torrigiani. The show was held on February 12, 1951, in the presence of six important American buyers, who, as he himself stated in various interviews, "went to Florence as a simple courtesy visit". These were: Gertrude Ziminsky of B. Altman and Company in New York, John Nixon of Morgan's in Montreal, Jessica Daves of American Vogue, Ethel Frankau and Julia Trissel of Bergdorf Goodman in New York, and Stella Hanania of I. Magnin in San Francisco. Giorgini had planned to present 18 models from 10 Italian fashion houses. The Italian couturiers who presented at the show were: Princess Giovanna Caracciolo of Atelier Carosa, Alberto Fabiani, Duchess Simonetta Colonna di Cesaro Visconti of Simonetta, Emilio Schuberth, Sorelle Fontana, Jole Veneziani, Vanna (the trade name used by the tailors Anna Carmeli and Manette Valente), Vita Noberasko, and Germana Marucelli. The prêt-à-porter designers were Emilio Pucci, Giorgio Avolio, Baroness Clarette Gallotti of La Tessitrice Dell'Isola, and Marquise Olga di Grésy of Mirsa. Giorgini's resourcefulness, the quality of the products, the buyers' reputation, and the support of some journalists like Irene Brin, who as Italian editor for Harper's Bazaar advertised the event overseas, decreed its success.

It was an exceptional event, because from that moment on the world really started talking about Italian fashion. The second fashion show took place in July 1951 in the halls of the "Grand Hotel" in Florence. Beginning in 1952, two seasons of fashion shows per year (one in January and the other in July) were organized in the historic parade of the Sala Bianca of Palazzo Pitti in Florence with the stylists Sartoria Antonelli, Roberto Capucci, Vincenzo Ferdinandi, the Atelier Carosa, Giovanelli Sciarra, Polinober, Germana Marucelli, the Sartoria Vanna, Jole Veneziani and sixteen companies presented sportswear and boutiques. A very young Oriana Fallaci, sent by the weekly Epoca, told the news. In 1954, the Florence Center for Italian fashion was born, which had Mario Vannini Paren as its first director.

In the 1960s, Giovanni Battista Giorgini succeeded in conquering the Japanese market, selling Italian creations to Isetan, one of the most important department stores in the country. His emphasis on prêt-à-porter led to the early success of Florentine fashion shows, but this became a source of conflict with the great Roman fashion houses that decided to create competing Haute Couture fashion shows directly in Rome in 1967.

== Death and legacy ==
Giorgini died on January 2, 1971, in Florence, at Villa Torrigiani (The Torrigiani Garden), and was buried in the Cimitero degli Allori (cemetery) on Senese street.

His personal archive was filed in 2005 by his grandson Neri Fadigati at the Florence State Archives.
