= Emilio Pucci =

Italian fashion designer and politician

Don Emilio Pucci
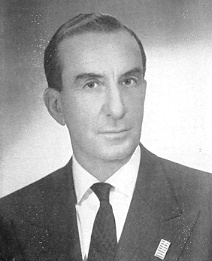
- Emilio Pucci in 1963
- Born: 20 November 1914; Naples, Kingdom of Italy
- Died: 29 November 1992 (aged 78); Florence, Italy
- Education: University of Georgia; Reed College (MA); University of Florence (laurea)
- Occupation: Fashion designer
- Known for: Geometric prints
- Label: Emilio Pucci
- Website: www.pucci.com

Marchese Emilio Pucci di Barsento (Italian pronunciation: [eˈmiːljo ˈputtʃi]; 20 November 1914 – 29 November 1992) was an Italian aristocrat, fashion designer and politician. He and his eponymous company Pucci designed geometric prints in many colors.

== Early life ==
Pucci was born in Naples in 1914 to the Pucci family, and he lived and worked in the Pucci Palace in Florence for much of his life.

At the age of 17 Pucci traveled to Lake Placid, New York, as part of the Italian team at the 1932 Winter Olympics, where he did not compete. After two years at the University of Milan, he studied agriculture at the University of Georgia in Athens, Georgia, United States. In 1935, he was given a full scholarship to Reed College in Oregon in return for developing a college ski team. He earned an MA in social science from Reed College in 1937, and was awarded his doctorate (laurea) in political science from the University of Florence in 1941.

== World War II ==
In 1938, Pucci joined the Italian Air Force, and served as an SM.79 torpedo bomber pilot during World War II, rising to the rank of captain and receiving decorations for valour. During the war he became a confidant of Benito Mussolini's eldest daughter, Edda, and played a key role in a plan to save the life of her husband, Mussolini's former Foreign Minister, Count Galeazzo Ciano, who was on trial for his part in the removal of Mussolini from power in 1943. The plan involved delivering some of Ciano's papers (which were highly critical of Mussolini) to the Gestapo so that they could be bartered for Ciano's life.

After Adolf Hitler vetoed the scheme, Pucci drove Edda to the Swiss border on 9 January 1944 and ensured her escape. Before departing, Edda wrote last pleas to Hitler, Mussolini, and General Wilhelm Harster, the SD commander in Italy, and Pucci delivered these letters to an intermediary. He then attempted to flee to Switzerland himself, but he was arrested and transported to San Vittore prison in Milan, where he was tortured by the Gestapo in a futile attempt to extract information. Pucci then managed to escape and reach Switzerland, where he remained until the end of the war.

== Fashion career ==
Emilio Pucci S.r.l.
- Type: Private
- Industry: Fashion
- Founded: 1947
- Founder: Emilio Pucci
- Headquarters: Florence, Italy
- Number of locations: 21 stores worldwide (2025)
- Area served: Worldwide
- Key people: Camille Miceli, Artistic Director
- Products: Clothing, homewares
- Revenue: ▲€60.1 million (2012)
- Owner: LVMH
- Website: www.pucci.com

Previous Emilio Pucci logo

The first clothes designed by Pucci were for the Reed College skiing team. His designs came to wider attention in 1947, when he was on leave in Zermatt, Switzerland. Skiwear that he had designed for a female friend was photographed by Toni Frissell, a photographer working for Harper's Bazaar. Frissell's editor asked Pucci to design skiwear for a story on European Winter Fashion, which ran in the winter 1948 issue of the Bazaar.

Pucci was the first person to design a one-piece ski suit. Although there had been some experiments with stretch fabrics in Europe before the war, Pucci's sleek designs caused a sensation, and he received several offers from American manufacturers to produce them. Instead, he left the Air Force and set up an haute couture house in the fashionable resort of Canzone del Mare on the Isle of Capri.

Initially, he used his knowledge of stretch fabrics to produce a swimwear line in 1949, but he soon moved onto other items such as brightly coloured, boldly patterned silk scarves. Stanley Marcus of Neiman Marcus encouraged him to use the designs in blouses and then a popular line of wrinkle-free printed silk dresses. In 1951 Giovanni Battista Giorgini invited journalists and buyers from around the world to a Made in Italy fashion show in Florence featuring Emilio Schuberth, Sorelle Fontana, Simonetta Colonna di Cesarò, Roberto Capucci, Alberto Fabiani, Jole Veneziani, and Pucci.

Pucci added a boutique in Rome as business thrived, helped by Capri's role as a destination for the international jet set. By the early 1950s, Pucci was achieving international recognition, receiving the Neiman Marcus Award in Dallas in 1954 and the Burdines Fashion Award in Miami in 1955. Marilyn Monroe was photographed by George Barris in a number of Pucci's items. After Monroe's death in 1962, she was interred wearing a Pucci dress. Pucci was commissioned by Braniff International Airways to design uniforms in 1968 and again in 1972. His print designs in acid yellow, lime green, turquoise, and pink captured the expressed 1960s psychedelia.

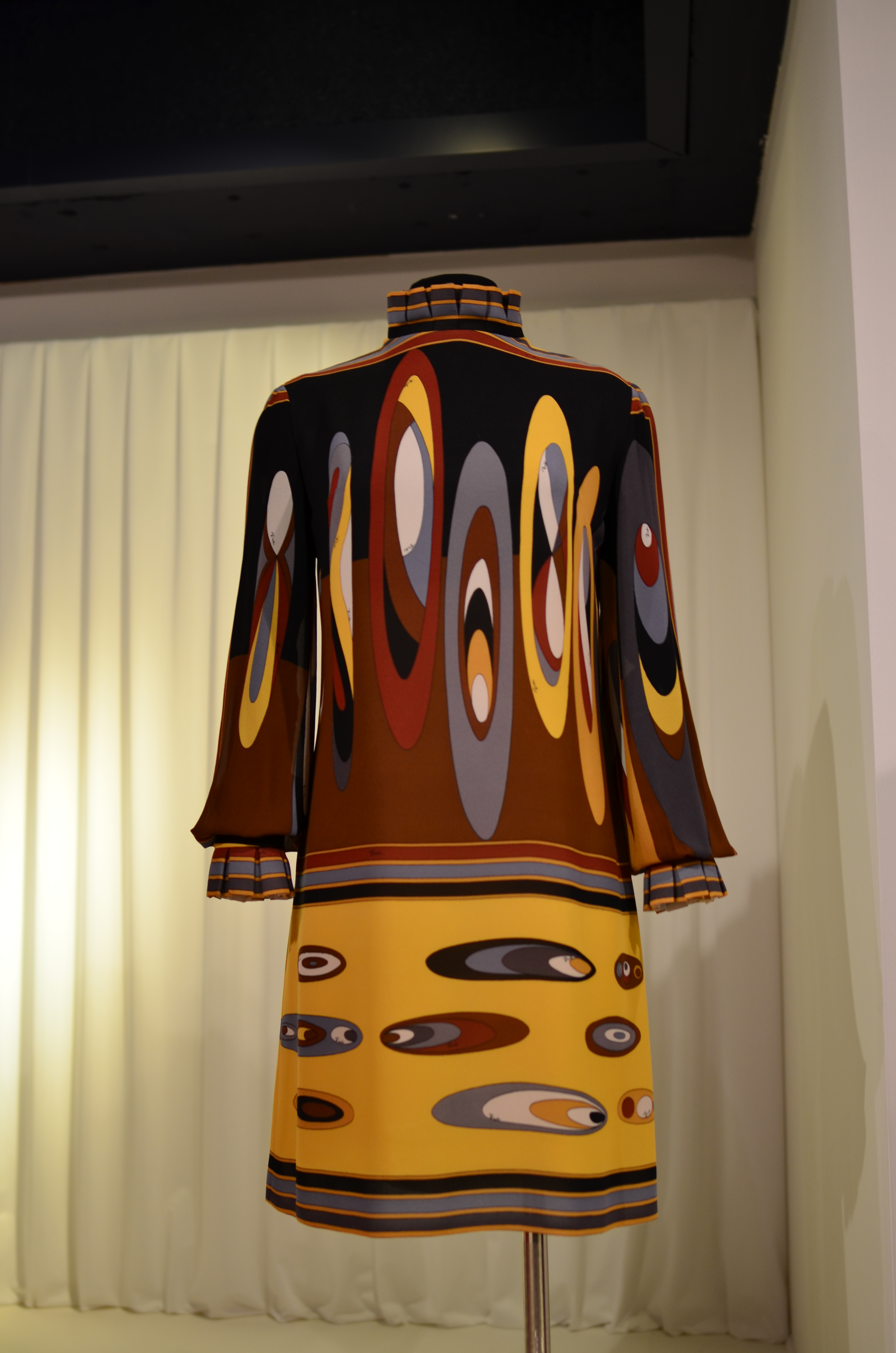
1970s Emilio Pucci cocktail dress sold at Frederick & Nelson in Seattle

As the decade progressed, his designs were worn by everyone from actress Sophia Loren to author Jacqueline Susann to First Lady Jackie Kennedy, as well as later pop icons, such as Madonna, during an early 1990s period of 60s revival. Whenever the Sixties were revived in fashion, Pucci was likely to be referenced. In fashion history, especially during the period of the 1950s and 1960s, Pucci was a perfect transition example between luxurious couture and ready-to-wear in Europe and the North America.

In 1959, Pucci decided to create a lingerie line. His atelier in Rome advised him to develop the line abroad, avoiding the difficulties of a decade earlier in matching available fabrics to the patterns of his first swimwear line. As a result, Pucci came to Chicago giving the lingerie contract to Formfit-Rogers mills. The venture proved to be successful, and Pucci was made vice president in charge of design and merchandising for the company a year later.

In February 1959, he married Cristina Nannini from Rome, about whom he later remarked, "I married a Botticelli." They had two children, Alessandro and Laudomia. Alessandro died in a car crash in 1998, six years after his father.

== Braniff Airways, NASA, and Lincoln ==
In 1965, New York ad agency Jack Tinker and Associates was hired by Braniff International Airways to update their image. The agency's Mary Wells hired Alexander Girard to remodel the terminals, and Pucci to design new clothes for the hostesses.

Pucci designed six complete collections for Braniff hostesses, pilots and ground crew between 1965 and 1974. By 1968 Barbie had versions of all of his first four uniforms. These were designed as individual components to be added or removed as weather dictated. The uniforms included turtlenecks, T-shirts, crop jackets, and culottes. Pucci incorporated Girard's "BI" logo into some of his prints.

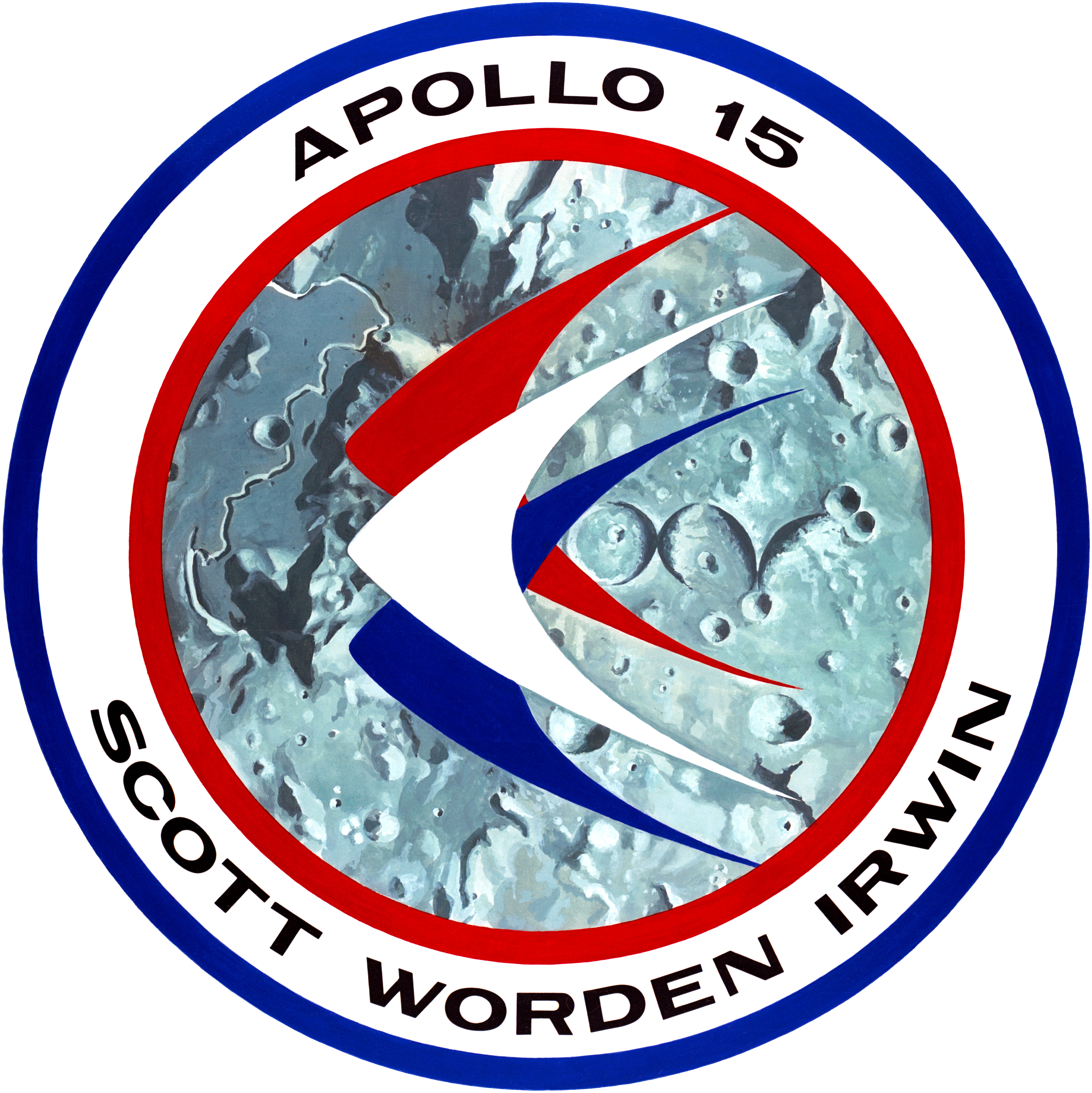

Pucci suggested the three bird motif for the design of the Apollo 15 mission patch.

From 1976 to 1983, Pucci chose exterior and interior colors and trim for a special Pucci Edition of the Lincoln Mark series of automobiles for the luxury Lincoln division of Ford Motor Company in the United States: a Mark IV in 1976, a Mark V from 1977 to 1979, and a Mark VI from 1980 to 1983, the details of the design changing slightly each year.

== Political career ==
Pucci contested the Florence–Pistoia district for the Italian Liberal Party in the Italian election of April 1963. He came second on their slate with 2,780 votes behind it:Vittorio Fossombroni, and the party won one seat. He succeeded Fossombroni in the Italian Chamber of Deputies in August of that year.

He retained his seat in the 1968 election and lost it in the 1972 election, in which he was the district's top PLI candidate with 4,231 votes.

== Pucci label ==
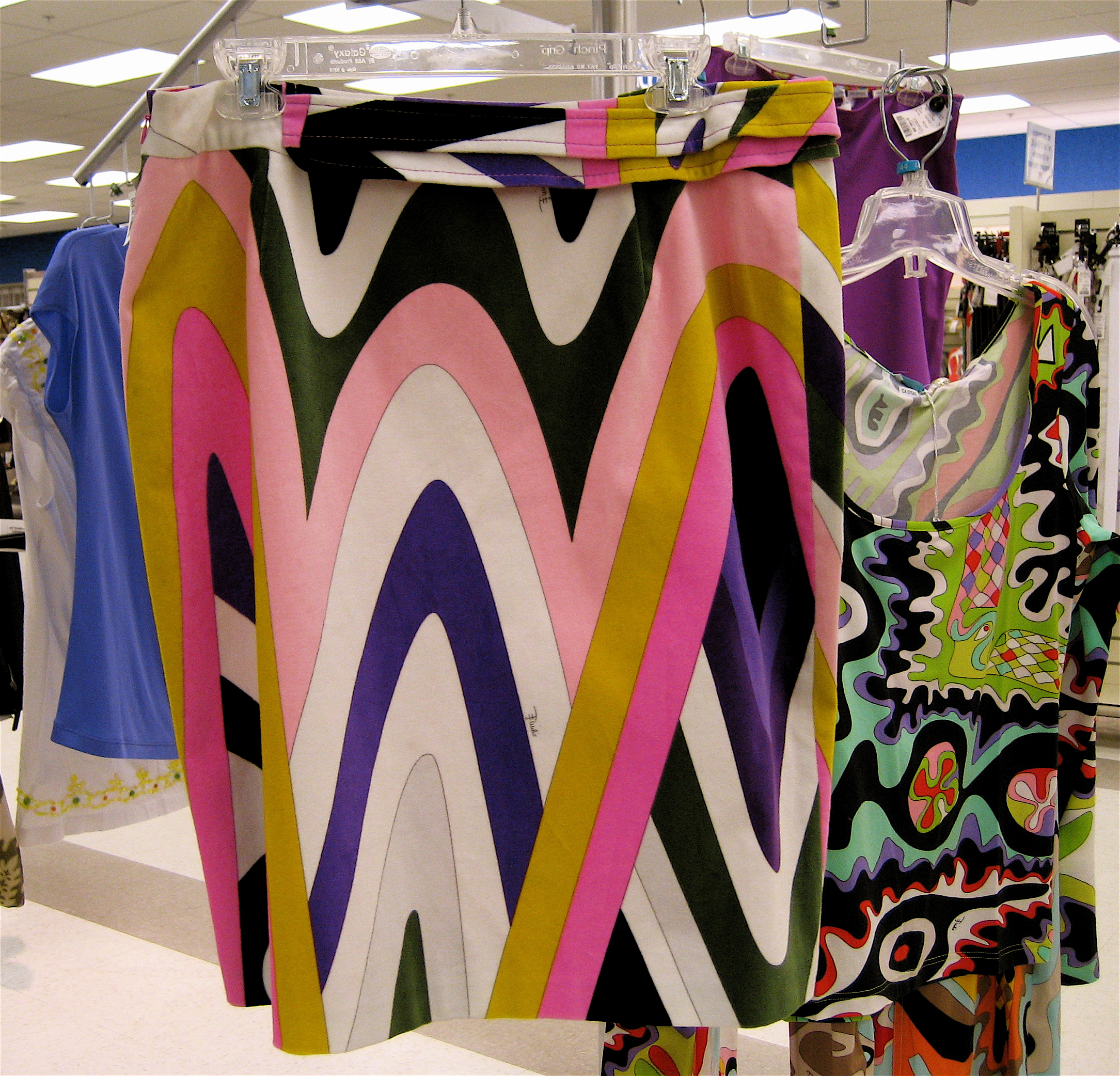
Pucci skirt and dress, 2007.

After Emilio Pucci's death in 1992, his daughter, Laudomia Pucci, continued to design under the Pucci name. The French LVMH luxury goods empire acquired 67% of Pucci in 2000. Laudomia became Image Director, while LVMH brought in major designers such as Christian Lacroix (creative director 2002–2005), and in October 2005, Matthew Williamson, and Peter Dundas from 2009.

Emilio Pucci clothes and accessories are sold through Emilio Pucci and Rossignol boutiques worldwide, and in high-end department stores designed by Lena Pessoa. The items mostly feature the designer's original brightly coloured, often swirly, prints or new designs in his original distinct style. The fashion house produces ready-to-wear clothes and accessories for women, in addition to a small range of men's accessories. In the past, the house has produced a more comprehensive range of men's wear, including a line in partnership with Ermenegildo Zegna, which included men's jackets lined with Pucci printed fabric, especially for American department store Saks Fifth Avenue. A limited-edition Pucci carrying case for the PlayStation Portable handheld gaming system was marketed by Sony as a high-end accessory on their PlayStation Signature line.

Pucci boutiques in the U.S., all designed by the Brazilian Lena Pessoa, are located in New York City, Las Vegas, Bal Harbour, Palm Beach, Beverly Hills, Boston, South Coast Plaza, East Hampton, New York, Miami and coming soon to Dallas. The newest of the stores just opened at 855 Monroe Ave. in New York City.

Clients include singer Kylie Minogue and presenter Alexa Chung.

Pucci also designed the costumes for Rita Ora's Radioactive Tour. In March 2014, Alessandra Carra stepped down as CEO of Pucci. In March 2015, Massino Giorgetti was named creative director, replacing Peter Dundas. Then from 2017 to 2021, Pucci operated without a creative director, relying on a team of designers. Since June 2021, LVMH owns 100% of Pucci. Laudomia Pucci remained in charge of the house's archives and heritage. In September 2021, Camille Miceli became creative director of Pucci. In July 2022, Saar Debrouwere took over as CEO of the fashion house.
