= Micol Fontana =

Italian stylist and entrepreneur

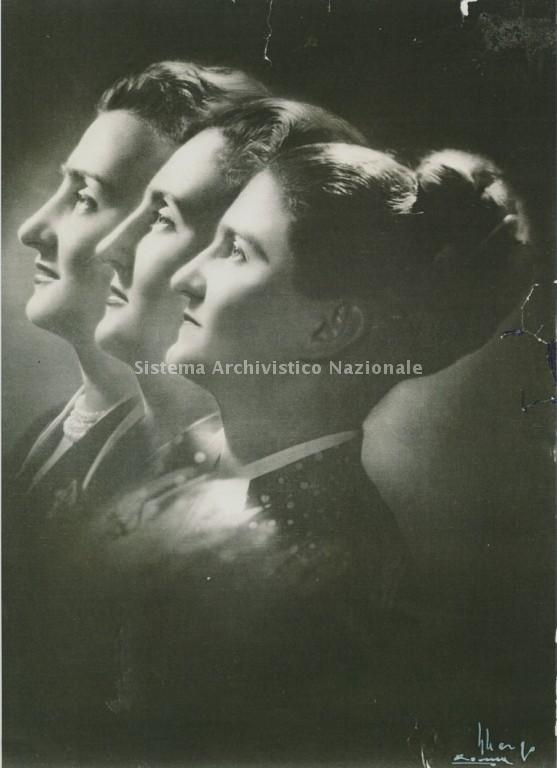

Micol Fontana (8 November 1913 – 12 June 2015) was an Italian stylist and entrepreneur, co-founder of the Sorelle Fontana fashion house. She was 101 years old when she died.

== Biography ==
Born in Traversetolo, Parma, Micol Fontana and her sisters Zoe and Giovanna moved to Rome in 1936 to launch a fashion career. They worked small jobs in the industry and finally opened their own shop, Casa di moda sorelle Fontana, in 1943.

She founded the S.I.A.M. - Italian High Fashion Syndicate in 1953, along with her sisters and other famous fashion designers such as Alberto Fabiani, Vincenzo Ferdinandi, Emilio Schuberth, Jole Veneziani, Giovannelli-Sciarra, Mingolini-Guggenheim, Eleanora Garnett, and Simonetta.

In 1957, the sisters designed Linda Christian's wedding dress for her marriage to Tyrone Power.

Following the deaths of her sisters and the selling of the company and brand to an Italian financial group in 1992, Micol established the Micol Fontana Foundation in 1994 with the goal of discovering and promoting new fashion talents.

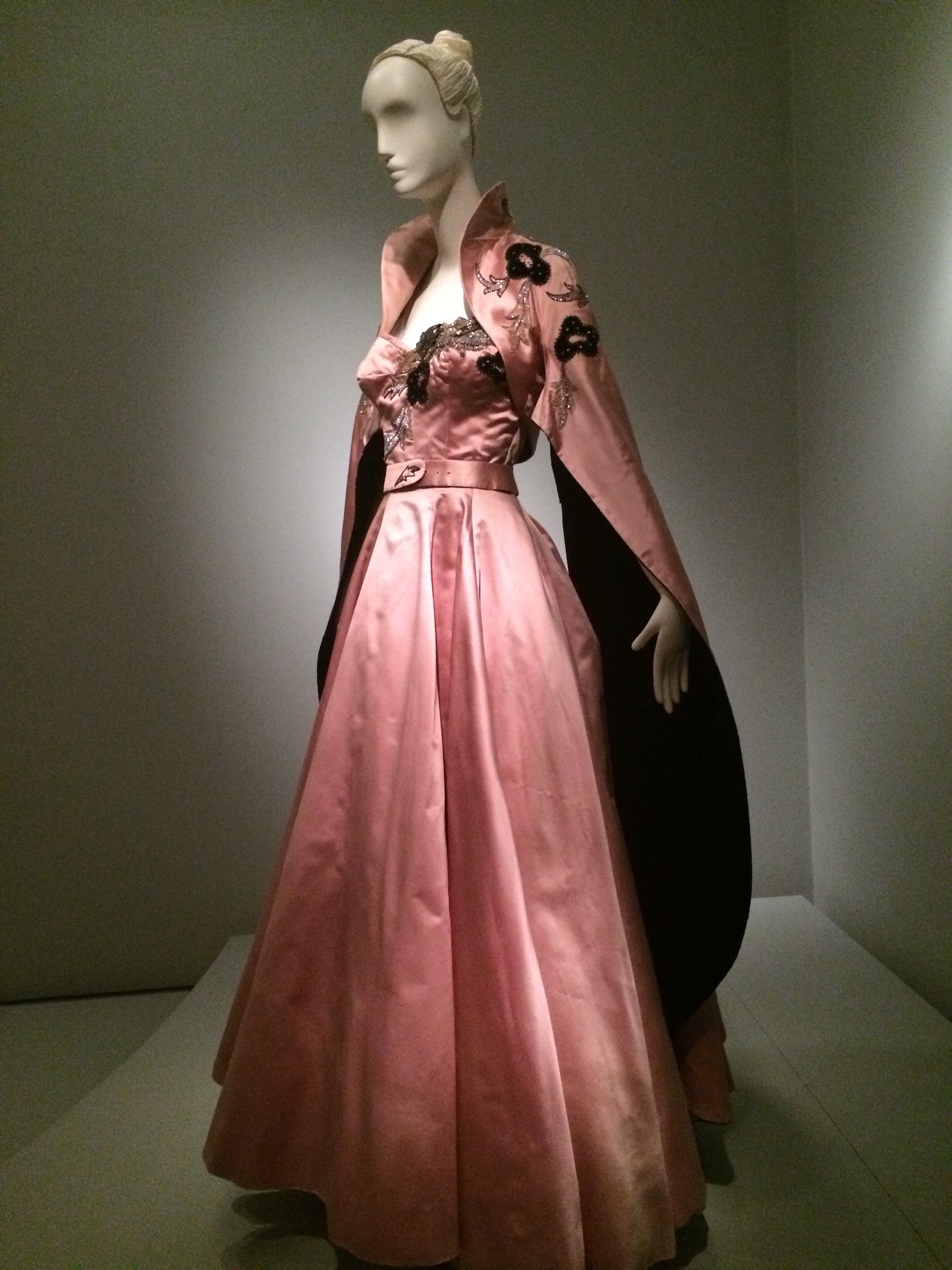

== Popular culture ==
As the designer of Margaret Truman's (daughter of U.S. President Harry S. Truman) wedding gown, Fontana was invited to appear as a mystery guest on the April 15, 1956 episode of What's My Line?. The Truman wedding occurred a few days later on April 21, 1956.

In La Dolce Vita, the tightly moulded priest’s cassock wore by Anita Ekberg in St Peter’s basilica was designed by Fontana.

A two-parts television miniseries based on the story of her fashion house, Atelier Fontana - Le sorelle della moda, was broadcast on Rai 1 in 2011, with Micol Fontana making a brief cameo as herself. She was portrayed by Alessandra Mastronardi.

== See also ==
- Sorelle Fontana
