= Casalegno =

Casalegno is a family name of Italian origin. Notable people with the surname include:

- Carlo Casalegno (1916–1977), Italian journalist and writer
- Elenoire Casalegno (born 1976), Italian television presenter
- Gabriele Casalegno (born c. 1923), Italian rugby player
- Gavin Casalegno, (born 1999), American actor
- Jacqueline Casalegno (1926–2019), French businesswoman
- Mattia Casalegno (born 1981), Italian artist
