= Maria Antonelli =

Maria Antonelli may refer to:

- Maria Elisa Antonelli (born 1984), Brazilian beach volleyball player
- Maria Antonelli (fashion designer) (1903–1969), pioneer of Italian fashion design
