= Atelier Fontana - Le sorelle della moda =

- Genre: Biographical drama
- Directed by: Riccardo Milani
- Starring: Alessandra Mastronardi; Anna Valle; Federica De Cola; Anna Bonaiuto; Gianni Cavina; Massimo De Santis; Marco Bocci; Paolo Bessegato; Marco Foschi; Massimo Wertmüller
- Composer: Andrea Guerra
- Country of origin: Italy

Original release
- Network: Rai 1
- Release: February 27 – February 28, 2011

Atelier Fontana - Le sorelle della moda ("Atelier Fontana - The sisters of fashion") is a 2011 Italian television miniseries directed by Riccardo Milani and broadcast on Rai 1. It is based on the story of the Sorelle Fontana fashion house and on real life events of the three founders, the sisters Zoe, Micol and Giovanna Fontana.

== Plot ==
Zoe, Micol and Giovanna Fontana are three young sisters who, after a peaceful childhood, work all together in the tailoring that their mother leads into her own home of Traversetolo, a small center in the province of Parma. Micol feels her self esteem a bit limited and dreams of opening a whole atelier in a big city. Meanwhile, while her elder sister Zoe marries Mario, a modest but very young boy, she lives a love story with Enrico Landi, the son of a very wealthy family, but he is known for scooping and therefore pissed off by the stern mom Amabile. But Micol has clear ideas about her future, and she soon convinces his sisters to move to Rome, then the Italian capital of fashion, so she marries Enrico, the great love of her life, despite being completely discharged by her parents.

In Rome, we are in the years 1938–39, the three girls find employment in some great tailor shops but they all struggle. Giovanna immediately chooses to leave her job as an employee, arranging for occasional jobs and looking after the house and the newborn daughter of Zoe. Micol has a turbulent relationship with the main Mazzocchi who, however, casually discovered the talent of his worker, slowly gives her more space. After having had a daughter, Maria Paola, Micol releases her oppressive employer thanks to the sponsorship of Princess Caetani, who finds out by chance that the creations she wears are actually the work of Micol himself, not Mazzocchi. With the support of this, the sisters can go in their own and open a whole tailoring. Micol also finds out that her husband has lied for months about his work and does not forgive him. With enormous sacrifices, then, the sisters are able to set up their first fashion show, but just on the eve of this comes the news that Henry took away his daughter Maria Paola. So Micol, busy retrieving the little girl, does not attend the triumph that has her first parade.

Micol returns to Rome with his daughter. About ten years later, it is thanks to little Maria Paola that Micol knows the famous actress Linda Christian. At the moment the meeting does not seem to have great consequences, but in reality will be decisive for the fate of the atelier. Meanwhile, Giovanna has also found love while Micol continues to raise the child without his father, being able to count on the support of his parents, who have now moved to Rome.

Business goes bad until Linda Christian returns to the atelier to ask Micol to pack her wedding dress for the wedding that will join her with Hollywood's Tyrone Power. It is the turning point that all awaited. The popularity of this event will make the Fontana Sisters famous all over the world and therefore very demanding. Overwhelming, however, prevents Micol from accompanying Tropea to her daughter, who leaves with her sister Giovanna. When it is almost released, Calabria suddenly comes to the news that the baby is very bad. Micol rushes to the bedside of his daughter, to whom the thoughtful dr. Leonardo Cafiero diagnoses typhus. Emergency in Rome, there is nothing left to do. The girl dies and Micol falls into depression. To support her, her husband Enrico returns incredibly. She seems to appreciate her closeness, but as soon as he starts to settle down again (for financial reasons and to enjoy what Micol has built with so much sacrifice), she hunts him permanently.

Determined to cancel the marriage, Micol now drags herself without understanding the meaning of her life, after the loss of her daughter. Following insistence he collects a council of Dr. Cafiero and an invitation of her friend Linda Christian, visiting her in Hollywood. In the United States, after a long stay, it rediscovers the lost stimuli and the contacts it initiates will be decisive for a further impulse to the activity of the Fontana atelier.

Again in Rome, the sisters welcome with pleasure the renewed enthusiasm of Micol, which seems even overwhelming. Not only has he committed himself to providing clothes for Ava Gardner's new film The Barefoot Contessa, but wants to build a high fashion collection that can launch it on the American market, she says she is very much in favor of accepting Italian style. The effort would seem unbearable, but with new funding and a great boost of the atelier, the three sisters, with no initial contrasts and internal divergence, can perfectly compile and meet all the demands.

Micol has also regained his love with Leonardo, as he seals the success of the three sisters, arrives at the private audience with the Pope, receiving them with a representation of women workers and proud parents. Mom Amabile will soon leave them, while her three daughters are now the undisputed ambassadors of Italian style in the world.

Micol Fontana appears in the very last sequence of the movie: she was the only one of the three sisters still alive in 2010, when the fiction was filmed.

== Main cast ==
- Alessandra Mastronardi as Micol Fontana
- Anna Valle as Zoe Fontana
- Federica De Cola as Giovanna Fontana
- Anna Bonaiuto as Mother Amabile
- Gianni Cavina as Giovanni Fontana
- Marco Bocci as Enrico Landi
- Marco Foschi as Leonardo
- Massimo Wertmüller as Mazzocchi
- Massimo De Santis as Zoe's husband
- Hariett McMasters-Green as Linda Christian
- Piera Degli Esposti as Princess Caetani
- Ariella Reggio as Grandma Zeide
- Micol Fontana as herself
