= Camera Nazionale della Moda Italiana =

Italian non-profit organization

- Italian Fashion Council or National Chamber for Italian Fashion
- Abbreviation: CNMI
- Nickname: Camera della Moda
- Formation: 1953
- Purpose: Promotion, coordination of the Italian fashion industry and the training of young Italian designers.
- Location(s): Via Gerolamo Morone n. 6. Milan, Italy
- Website: cameramoda.it

Camera Nazionale della Moda Italiana (often translated to National Chamber for Italian Fashion or Italian Fashion Council in English) is a non-profit organization, whose purpose is the promotion, coordination of the Italian fashion industry and the training of young Italian designers.

It is most well known for being the organizer of Milan Fashion Week, one of the big four global fashion weeks alongside New York, Paris, and London.

== History ==
Camera della Moda can trace its roots to the founding of Sindacato Italiano Alta Moda in 1953 by Sorelle Fontana, Simonetta Colonna di Cesarò, Vincenzo Ferdinandi, Jole Veneziani, Alberto Fabiani, Giovannelli-Sciarra, Mingolini-Gugenheim, Eleonora Garnett, among others.

It is based in Milan, Via Gerolamo Morone n. 6. It currently represents more than 200 companies operating in various sectors: clothing, accessories, leather goods, footwear, distribution.

Noted Italian fashion designer Loris Abate served as president of the group from 1985 to 1991. Giuseppe "Beppe" Modenese served as honorary president until his death on November 21, 2020. Mario Boselli, a former president, is now honorary president with Carlo Capasa serving as president.

== Structure ==
The governing bodies of the National Chamber of Italian Fashion are the Board of Directors and the Management Committee. The Board is composed of a number of members ranging from eleven to eighteen. It has the power to the ordinary and extraordinary management of the association. The Presidential Committee consists of the President and four Vice-Presidents of the Executive Council. It deals with the ordinary and in the urgent cases it could substitute the Executive Council.

== Activities ==
One of the key activities that is organized by the chamber is the fashion event to promote the Italian fashion. Chief among its activities is the Milan Fashion Week, which was established in 1958. It is one of the world's big five fashion weeks alongside New York, Paris, London, and Tokyo.

== See also ==
- British Fashion Council
- Council of Fashion Designers of America
- Fédération de la Haute Couture et de la Mode
