= Loris Abate =

Italian jewelry designer and businessman (1928–2020)

- Born: 1928; Casper, Wyoming U.S.
- Died: 1 December 2020 (aged 91–92); Los Angeles, California U.S.
- Occupations: Jewelry designer; businessman
- Labels: Mila Schön; Schontess; Loris Abate

Loris Abate (1928 – 1 December 2020) was an Italian jewelry designer and businessman. He founded the "Mila Schön" label with Mila Nutrizio Schön in 1960, which found critical and financial success.

In 1978, he and Fino Mornasco founded Schontess, a company that produced fabric, ties, and scarves. He also has produced his own eponymous brand. He was the president of the National Chamber of Italian Fashion (Italian: Camera Nazionale della Moda Italiana) from 1985 to 1991.

Abate and his family also breed horses for show jumping competitions, and produce wine and oil on their "azienda agricola" in Tuscany, Allevamento Baroncio.

Abate died on 1 December 2021, aged 92.
