= Vincenzo Ferdinandi =

Italian fashion designer

- Vincenzo Ferdinandi in 1950
- Born: 29 November 1920; Newark, New Jersey, US
- Died: 22 April 1990 (aged 69); Rome, Italy
- Occupation: Fashion designer

Vincenzo Ferdinandi (29 November 1920 – 22 April 1990) was an Italian designer among the founders of Italian haute couture.

== Biography ==
Born in the United States, he moved to Italy in the early 1950s to open an atelier in Rome in the fashionable Via Veneto.

He was among the first great haute couture designers to compete with the French in the international arena. In 1949 he was in Paris, called by Christian Dior for a stylistic collaboration with the French maison. After that experience, London also called him to design a line of shoes.

Together with other names of the Italian fashion of the time such as Roberto Capucci, the Sartoria Antonelli, the atelier Carosa, Giovannelli-Sciarra, Germana Marucelli, Polinober, the Sartoria Vanna and Jole Veneziani, he participated in 1952 in the first historical parade at the Sala Bianca in Palazzo Pitti in Florence. A very young Oriana Fallaci sent by the weekly Epoca told the news

In 1953, together with other major names of the time (including Emilio Schuberth, the Sorelle Fontana, Alberto Fabiani, Jole Veneziani, Giovannelli-Sciarra, Mingolini-Guggenheim, Eleonora Garnett, Simonetta), he founded the SIAM - Italian High Fashion Syndicate (later to become the National Chamber of Italian Fashion). In July 1954, together with the Sorelle Fontana, Emilio Schuberth, Giovannelli Sciarra, Garnett and Mingolini-Guggenheim he took part in "Alta Moda in Castel Sant'Angelo". On that occasion, the American Sally Kirkland, Fashion Editor of Life and of Vogue, was awarded for her role as ambassador of Italian fashion in the United States.

His creations are worn by actresses and women. Jennifer Jones, May Britt, Virna Lisi, Sylva Koscina, Isabella Albonico, Eloisa Cianni, Lucia Bosè, Lilli Cerasoli, Ivy Nicholson, Loredana Pavone, Joe Patterson, Anna Maria Ghislanzoni, Marta Marzotto and young Elsa Martinelli are some of these
