= The Barefoot Contessa =

1954 film by Joseph L. Mankiewicz

- Theatrical release poster
- Directed by: Joseph L. Mankiewicz
- Written by: Joseph L. Mankiewicz
- Produced by: Joseph L. Mankiewicz (uncredited)
- Starring: Humphrey Bogart; Ava Gardner; Edmond O'Brien; Marius Goring; Valentina Cortese; Rossano Brazzi
- Cinematography: Jack Cardiff
- Edited by: William Hornbeck
- Music by: Mario Nascimbene
- Production company: Figaro
- Distributed by: United Artists (United States); Dear Film (Italy)
- Release dates: September 29, 1954 (United States); March 12, 1955 (Italy)
- Running time: 130 minutes
- Countries: United States; Italy
- Languages: English; Italian; Spanish
- Box office: $3.3 million (US/Canadian rentals)

The Barefoot Contessa is a 1954 romantic drama film written and directed by Joseph L. Mankiewicz about the life and loves of fictional Spanish sex symbol Maria Vargas. It stars Humphrey Bogart, Ava Gardner, and Edmond O'Brien. The plot focuses on social positioning and power politics within the world of film and high society.

For his performance, O'Brien won the Academy Award for Best Supporting Actor and the corresponding Golden Globe. Mankiewicz was nominated for the Academy Award for Best Original Screenplay.

The majority of the film is explained by Harry Dawes (Bogart), narrating the events, with additional sections narrated by Oscar Muldoon (O'Brien) and Count Vincenzo Torlato-Favrini (Brazzi).

== Plot ==
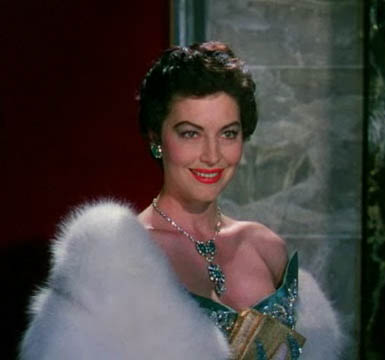
Gardner as Maria Vargas

Down-on-his-luck, washed-up film director and screenwriter Harry Dawes is reduced to working for business tycoon Kirk Edwards, who has decided that he wants to produce a film. Looking for a glamorous leading lady, they travel from Rome to a Madrid nightclub to see a dancer named Maria Vargas.

Maria is a blithe but proud spirit who likes to go barefoot and has a troubled home life. Maria immediately likes Harry, whose work she knows, but takes an instant dislike to Kirk. Although she flees during their meeting, Harry tracks her down to her family home and convinces her to fly with them to the United States to make her first film. Thanks to his expertise and the help of sweaty, insincere publicist Oscar Muldoon, her film debut is a sensation. Maria becomes an overnight star and Harry's career is resurrected; they become friends and make two more films together.

During a party at Maria's house in Hollywood, Kirk and wealthy South American playboy Alberto Bravano get into an argument over Maria. Alberto had conspicuously admired Maria during the evening. When Alberto invites her to join him on his yacht on the French Riviera, Kirk orders her to stay away from him. Offended by Kirk's attempted domineering, she accepts Alberto's invitation. Also seeing an opportunity, Oscar, tired of being Kirk's lackey, switches his allegiance to Alberto.

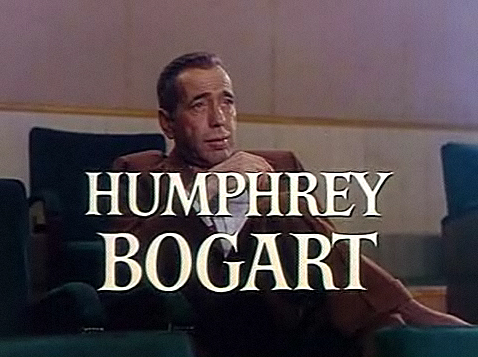
Bogart as director Harry Dawes

Maria is now a great star, but she is not satisfied. She envies the happiness her friend Harry has found with his script girl Jerry. One evening at the Monte Carlo Casino, Alberto goes on a losing streak and berates Maria in public for ruining his luck. Count Vincenzo Torlato-Favrini slaps him in the face, then escorts Maria from the casino.

Maria stays with Vincenzo and his widowed sister, Eleanora, at the count's palazzo in Rapallo, Italy. She has found the great love of her life, and they wed in a lavish ceremony, in which Harry gives away the bride. There is a problem, however: the count and his sister are the last of the Torlato-Favrinis; without offspring, the noble line will die out. The count is impotent due to a war injury, which he does not disclose to Maria until their wedding night.

On a rainy night, months later, with Harry in Italy, an unhappy Maria arrives at his hotel room and tells him about her husband's impotence. She has come up with a solution that appalls Harry: she has become pregnant by another man. She believes Vincenzo will welcome this child in order to perpetuate the family lineage. Harry warns her Vincenzo is too proud to accept this, but Maria feels otherwise and plans to tell him about her pregnancy that night.

After Maria leaves his hotel room, Harry notices Vincenzo's car trailing hers, and follows them. Back at the palazzo in the servants' quarters, Vincenzo shoots to death both Maria and her lover before she can tell him about the child. Harry arrives just as the shots are fired, but does not tell Vincenzo about the pregnancy. Shortly after her funeral, Vincenzo is taken away by the police.

== Cast ==
- Humphrey Bogart as Harry Dawes
- Ava Gardner as Maria Vargas
- Edmond O'Brien as Oscar Muldoon
- Marius Goring as Alberto Bravano
- Valentina Cortese (credited as Valentina Cortesa) as Eleanora Torlato-Favrini
- Rossano Brazzi as Count Vincenzo Torlato-Favrini
- Elizabeth Sellars as Jerry Dawes
- Warren Stevens as Kirk Edwards
- Franco Interlenghi as Pedro Vargas
- Mari Aldon as Myrna
- Alberto Rabagliati as nightclub proprietor
- Enzo Staiola as busboy
- Maria Zanoli as Maria's mother
- Renato Chiantoni as Maria's father
- Bill Fraser as J. Montague Brown
- John Parrish as Mr. Black
- Jim Gerald as Mr. Blue
- Diana Decker as drunken blonde
- Riccardo Rioli as Gypsy dancer
- Tonio Selwart as the pretender
- Margaret Anderson as the pretender's wife
- Gertrude Flynn as Lulu McGee
- John Horne as Hector Eubanks
- Bessie Love as Mrs. Eubanks
- Bob Christopher as Eddie Blake
- Anna Maria Paduan as chambermaid
- Carlo Dale as chauffeur

== Production ==
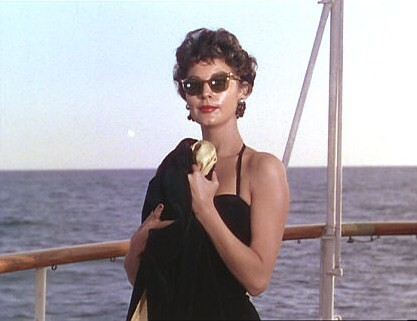
Gardner in a trailer for the film

In April 1953, The New York Times reported Joseph L. Mankiewicz was negotiating a termination to his three-picture contract with Metro-Goldwyn-Mayer (MGM) in exchange for permission to form Figaro, Inc., an independent production company. One month later, a settlement was reached that Mankiewicz would direct one more film with MGM. Meanwhile, his independent company Figaro, Inc. had signed a two-picture deal with United Artists (UA). His first project was reported to be The Barefoot Contessa, which Mankiewicz had initially written to be a novel.

The inspiration for the central character of Maria Vargas has been disputed. According to Turner Classic Movies (TCM), Mankiewicz took inspiration from Rita Hayworth, who had been married to Prince Aly Khan. Ava Gardner's biographer Lee Server stated Vargas was inspired by several Hollywood actresses, including Rita Hayworth, Linda Darnell, and Anne Chevalier. Mankiewicz initially sought an unknown actress, and then considered lesser-known actresses such as Rossana Podestà and Joan Collins. Eventually, Mankiewicz, along with United Artists studio executives Arthur B. Krim and Robert Benjamin, decided on casting Ava Gardner. Since Gardner was under contract with MGM, a loan arrangement was reached with a payment of $200,000 plus 10 percent of the box office returns. On the other hand, her co-star Humphrey Bogart received top billing but accepted less than half of Gardner's compensation.

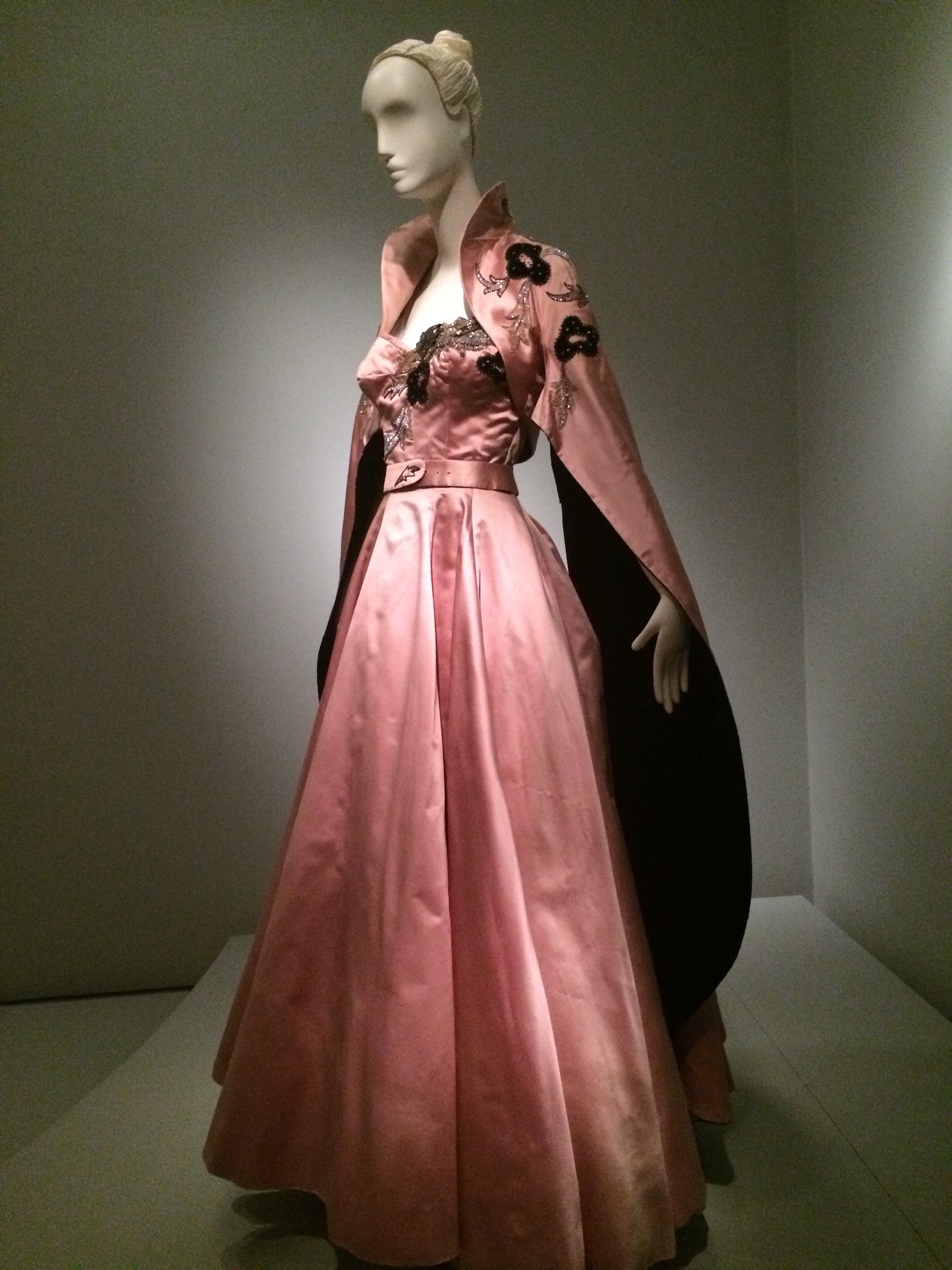
Silk evening ensemble designed by Micol, Zoe and Giovanna Fontana for Gardner's role in The Barefoot Contessa (Brooklyn Museum)

Filmed during the "Hollywood on the Tiber" phenomenon, principal photography began in January 1954 at Cinecittà in Rome. In her memoir, Gardner expressed she "felt nervous at being in such high-toned company. And I have to say that Mr. Bogart did not make my life any easier." On her first day of filming, Bogart turned away from her during one take and shouted, "Hey, Mankiewicz, can you tell this dame to speak up? I can't hear a goddamn word she says." As filming proceeded, multiple takes were done as Bogart had severe racking coughs while delivering his lines.

According to Gardner, her relations with Mankiewicz was "problematical at times". During one camera test, cinematographer Jack Cardiff had asked her to lay still at the edge of a sofa. As Cardiff tested his lenses, and Gardner laid pensively, Mankiewicz walked by and said, "You're the sittingest goddamn actress I've ever worked with." Gardner took offense to the statement and withdrew her personal trust in him. Decades later, Mankiewicz told his biographer Kenneth L. Geist: "I'm truly sorry about it. I made a stupid joke which I thought would make her laugh and relax, and it had just the opposite effect."

By March 1954, Gardner spent three weeks doing dance rehearsals and shot an elegant sequence in the olive groves of Tivoli outside of Rome. By April, exterior scenes were shot at Sanremo and Portofino. Bogart was not on location at Sanremo.

== Reception ==
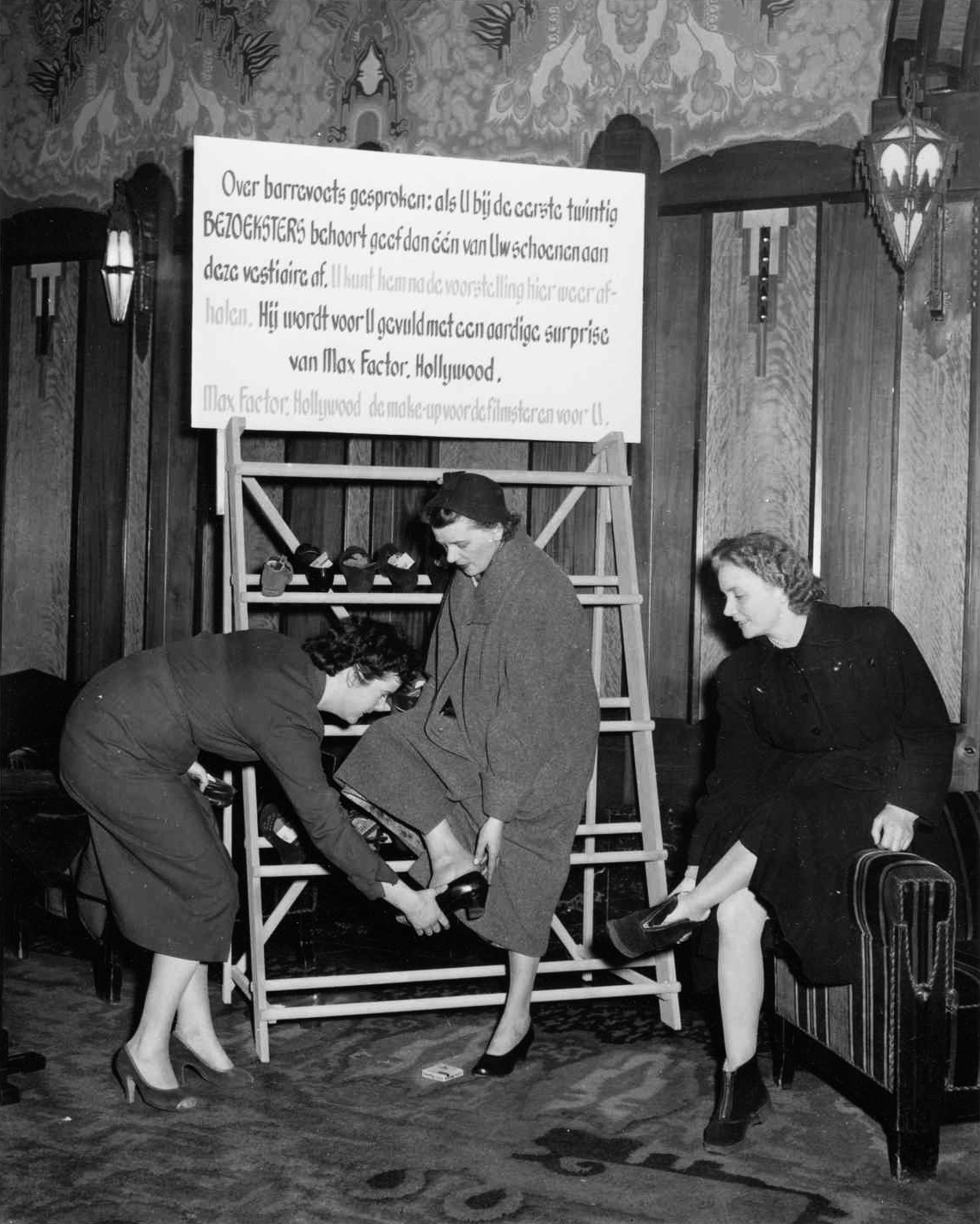
Publicity stunt at a 1955 screening of The Barefoot Contessa at the Tuschinski Theatre, Amsterdam; the first twenty ladies who left their shoes in the cloakroom at the theatre would receive free Max Factor products.

The film was praised by many critics for its extravagance, which earned the director many new admirers. Gene Arneel of Variety praised the film as a "dish of ingeniously-fashioned, original entertainment for grown-up viewers. it has a strong show business flavor and a line or two that might be beyond the ken of strangers in movie-making. But its basic story elements are strong and make for substantial fare on anyone's menu." Harrison's Reports felt Gardner was "most effective as the headstrong but sympathetic heroine" and also praised Bogart and O'Brien's performances, concluding it was a "notable production on every count, with much credit due Mr. Mankiewicz for the highly imaginative twists and directorial touches he has given to his well-written screenplay."

Philip K. Scheuer of the Los Angeles Times called the film Mankiewicz's "wickedest scalping job to date, not excepting All About Eve". He further stated the buildup to Gardner's entrance will be "the envy of every actress". The Chicago Tribune wrote: "The camera work is exceptionally fine, the color exquisite. Ava Gardner was never lovelier to look at, but she gives her role a self-conscious immobility much of the time. Edmond O'Brien is the personification of a good many public relations men I have known, but it's Humphrey Bogart who walks away with the top honors."

Some critics disapproved of the film. Bosley Crowther in The New York Times described it as a "grotesque barren film" about the "glittering and graceless behavior of the Hollywood-international set." Bennett Cerf, in a review for Saturday Review, wrote the film was "another picture far above the average run, but after a brave start author-director Joe Mankiewicz goes off the beam when he suddenly shifts the focus to a doomed Italian count". The 2012 book Feature Cinema in the 20th Century: Volume One: 1913–1950: a Comprehensive Guide called the film "dreadful", remarking that Mankiewicz's "intelligence and ambitious aims too often collide with an astonishing lack of subtlety and aesthetic judgment".

However, François Truffaut wrote: "what is beyond doubt is its total sincerity, novelty, daring, and fascination ... I myself accept and value it for its freshness, intelligence, and beauty ... A subtle and intelligent film, beautifully directed and acted." In 1998, Jonathan Rosenbaum of the Chicago Reader included the film in his unranked list of the best American films not included on the AFI Top 100. On Rotten Tomatoes, 100% of 12 critics gave the film a positive review.

=== Accolades ===
Award	Category	Recipient(s)	Result	Ref.
Academy Awards	Best Supporting Actor	Edmond O'Brien	Won	
Academy Awards	Best Story and Screenplay	Joseph L. Mankiewicz	Nominated	
Cahiers du Cinéma	Best Film	Joseph L. Mankiewicz	Nominated	
Golden Globe Awards	Best Supporting Actor – Motion Picture	Edmond O'Brien	Won	
New York Film Critics Circle Awards	Best Actor	Edmond O'Brien	Nominated	
Writers Guild of America Awards	Best Written American Drama	Joseph L. Mankiewicz	Nominated	

== In popular culture ==
The May 1955 issue of Mad (#23) has a parody by Jack Davis entitled "The Barefoot Nocountessa".

The Food Network cooking show Barefoot Contessa is named after Ina Garten's best-selling cookbook, The Barefoot Contessa Cookbook, which was in turn named after Garten's specialty food store, which she bought already named in 1978. The store, which is no longer in operation, opened in 1975 and was named after this film.

== Home media ==
The VHS from MGM was first released in 1990 and again in 1999 as part of the Vintage Classics lineup. MGM also released the DVD version in 2001.

On December 13, 2016, Twilight Time Movies released The Barefoot Contessa on high-definition Blu-ray. This release is a limited-edition release of 3000 copies.

== Bibliography ==
- Gardner, Ava (1992). Ava: My Story. London: Bantam Press. ISBN 978-0-7089-8631-8.
- Geist, Kenneth L. (1978). Pictures Will Talk: The Life and Films of Joseph L. Mankiewicz. New York: Scribners. ISBN 978-0-684-15500-5.
- Server, Lee (2006). Ava Gardner: Love is Nothing. New York: St. Martin's Press. ISBN 978-0-312-31209-1.
