= Jacqueline Casalegno =

French businesswoman (1926–2019)

- Born: 1 January 1926
- Died: 23 January 2019 (aged 93)
- Occupation: Businesswoman

Jacqueline Casalegno (1 January 1926 – 23 January 2019) was a French businesswoman. She was the founder and CEO of the Cameroonian business Chanas Assurance.

== Biography ==
Casalegno was the daughter of one of the first insurers in Cameroon. She founded Chanas Assurance after privatizing many Cameroonian agencies. She relinquished total control of the company in 2013. The clients consisted of 37% private Cameroonians, 20% the Casalegno group, 20% the Société Nationale des Hydrocarbures, 18% the OGAR Group, and 5% other European partners.

Casalegno died on 23 January 2019 at the age of 93.
