= Roberto Capucci =

Italian fashion designer (born 1930)

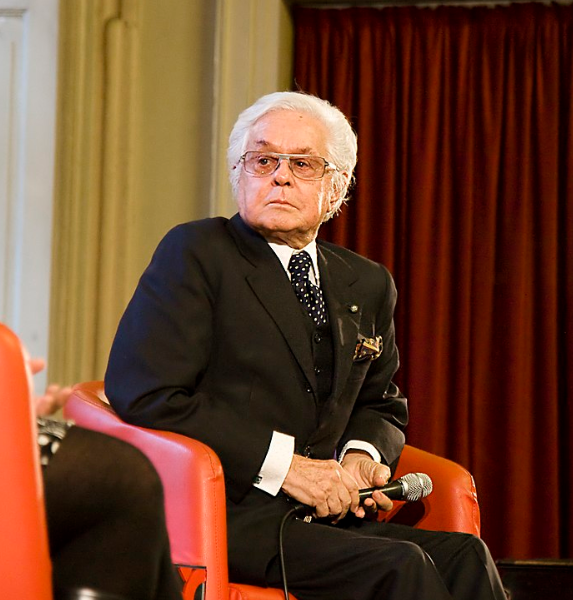
- Capucci in 2012
- Born: 2 December 1930 (age 95); Rome, Italy
- Education: Accademia di Belle Arti
- Occupation: Fashion designer
- Known for: Sculpture dresses
- Website: https://fondazionerobertocapucci.it/en/

Roberto Capucci (born 2 December 1930) is an Italian fashion designer.

== Early life and education ==
Capucci was born on 2 December 1930 in Rome, Italy. He studied art at the Accademia di Belle Arti, where he studied with artists such as Marino Mazzacurati, Marcello Avenali, and Libero De Libero.

== Career ==
During the 1950s, he started his first atelier on Via Sistina in Rome and showed his work at Giovanni Battista Giorgini's villa in Florence. A young Oriana Fallaci, reporting for the weekly Epoca, covered the news.

In 1952, he presented his work at the Sala Bianca of Palazzo Pitti in Florence alongside other designers such as Vincenzo Ferdinandi, Sartoria Antonelli, Atelier Carosa, Giovannelli-Sciarra, Polinober, Germana Marucelli, Sartoria Vanna, Jole Veneziani and 16 sportswear companies and boutiques.

In 1958, he introduced the Linea a Scatola (Box Line), which earned him the Boston Fashion Award (Filene's Young Talent Design Award) alongside Pierre Cardin and James Galanos.

In 1961, he received positive reviews from French critics at the Paris fashion shows, leading him to open his atelier at 4 Rue Cambon in Paris in 1962.

In 1968, he returned to Italy and began working in his studio on Via Gregoriana in Rome, where he presented his collections as part of the official fashion calendar organized by the Camera Nazionale della Moda Italiana. In the same year, he designed costumes for Silvana Mangano and Terence Stamp for Pier Paolo Pasolini's film Teorema.

In July 1970, Roberto Capucci presented his creations for the first time at the Nymphaeum of the National Etruscan Museum at Villa Giulia in Rome. The fashion show featured models without makeup or hairstyling wearing low-heeled boots. During this period, he began experimenting with rigid and structural decorative elements, such as precious fabrics, stones, and straw.

His career took a new direction in 1982, two years after he decided to leave the Camera Nazionale dell'Alta Moda, keeping his collections outside of official fashion calendars and institutions, showcasing them only when he deemed them to be ready.

A turning point in his career was in 1990 with the exhibition "Roberto Capucci, l'Arte nella Moda – Volume, Colore, Metodo", held at Palazzo Strozzi in Florence. His work has been exhibited at Kunsthistorisches Museum (Vienna, 1991), Philadelphia Museum of Art (Philadelphia, 1991), Schauspielhaus Theatre (Berlin, 1992), Nordiska Museet (Stockholm, 2001), and the Venaria Reale (Turin, 2007, 2016).

In 1995, he was invited to show his creations, such as Allanite, Antimonite and Cinabro at the Esposizione Internazionale di Arti Visive at La Biennale di Venezia.

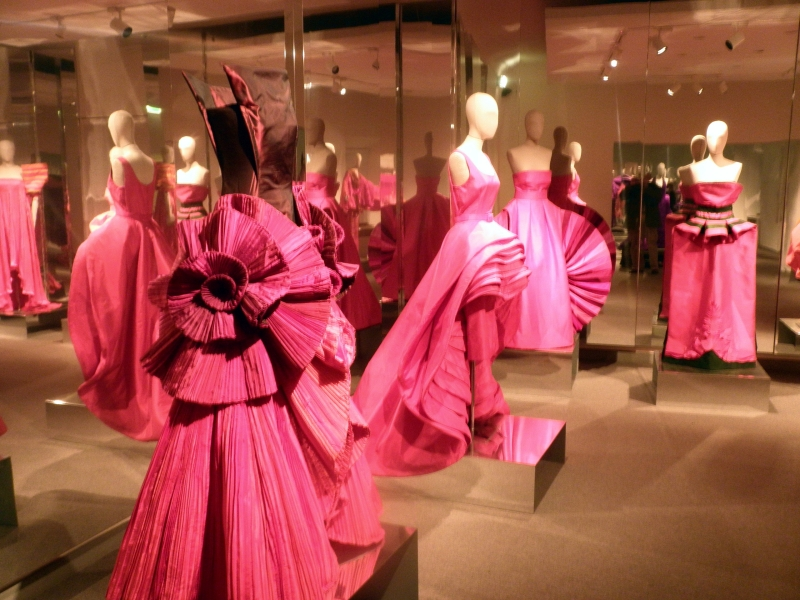
Capucci Museum in 2012

In 2005, with the Associazione Civita, he founded the Roberto Capucci Foundation, a foundation aimed at preserving his archive of 439 historical dresses, 500 signed illustrations, 22,000 original drawings, a full press release, and a photo and media library.

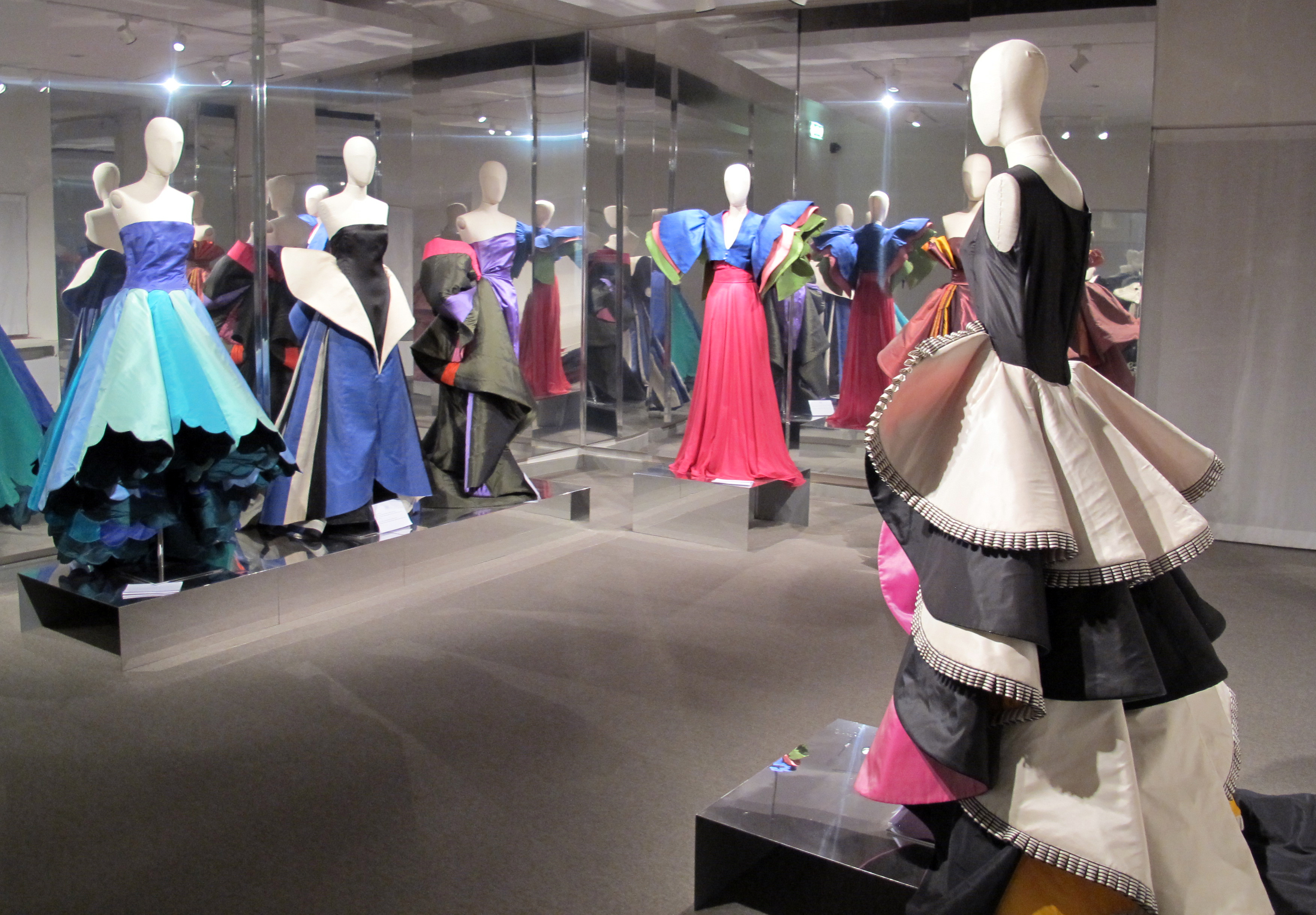
Capucci Museum in 2013

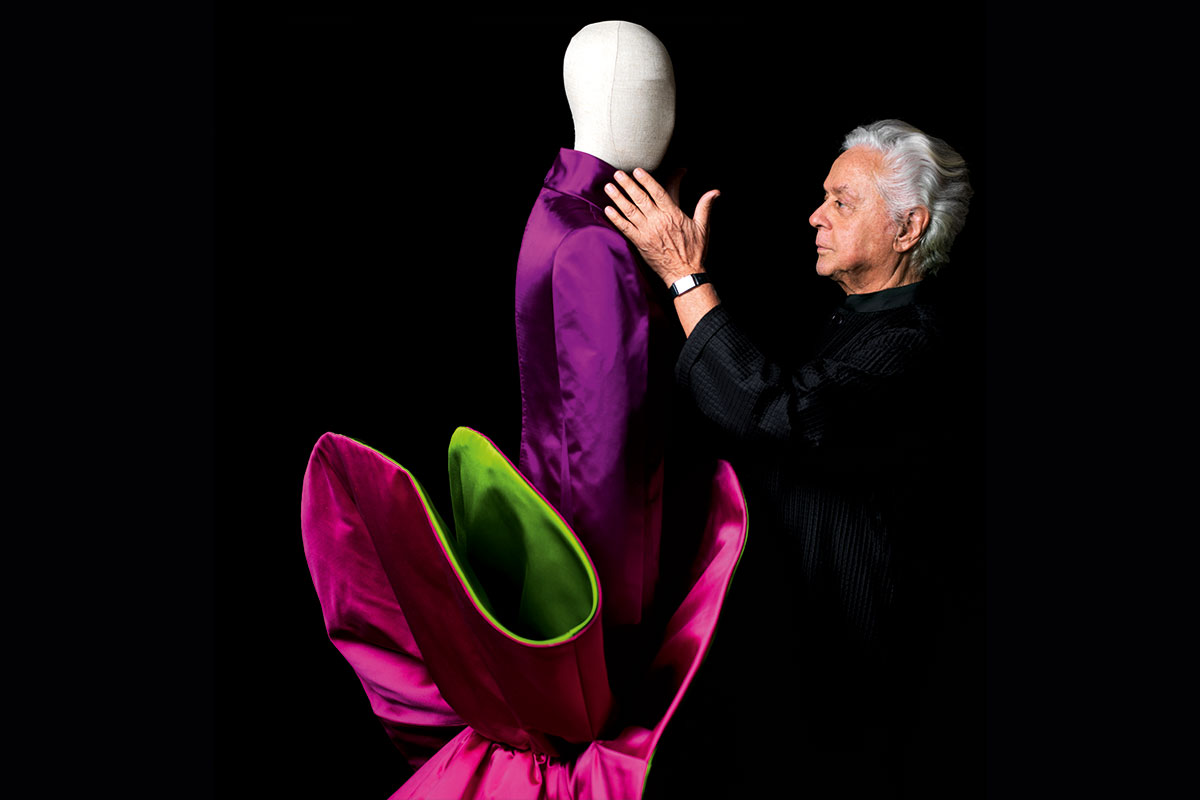
Capucci with one of his creations, Cerchio in Raso (2007).

In 2007, he inaugurated the Roberto Capucci Foundation Museum at Villa Bardini in Florence, hosting exhibitions and workshops.

In 2010, he collaborated with the artists Maurizio Martusciello and Mattia Casalegno on the audiovisual installation Il Gesto Sospeso, commissioned by FENDI and premiered at the Hadrian Temple during Rome Fashion Week.

From June to October 2012, the competition “Roberto Capucci per i giovani designer. Oltre agli abiti – Il design prende una nuova piega” ran. The awards ceremony for the competition took place on 9 April 2013 at the Royal Palace of Milan, with the finalists’ work being exhibited alongside dresses and 50 original sketches by Capucci at Palazzo Marando from 9 to 14 April 2013.

Since June 2025, an exhibition of Capucci's works, sketches, and pictures has been displayed at the Villa Pisani (Strà, Venice), curated by Enrico Minio Capucci, Paolo Alvise Capucci and Francesco Trentini.

== Exhibitions ==
Year	Title
2011	Roberto Capucci: Art into Fashion
2009	Fabric Sculpture Exhibit at Odescalchi Castle
2009	Roberto Capucci at Bracciano Castle
2009	Roberto Capucci fashion design at Palazzo Fortuny
2008	“Fantasie Guerriere” Warrior Fantasies
2007	Returning to Origins

== Family ==
Roberto Capucci has a younger brother, Fabrizio Capucci, and a niece, Sabrina Capucci, both with careers in acting.
