= Mattia Casalegno =

- Born: Naples
- Education: Sapienza University of Rome, UCLA
- Style: digital arts
- Movement: contemporary arts
- Website: www.mattiacasalegno.net

Mattia Casalegno is an Italian interdisciplinary artist, live-media performer and installation artist working in a broad range of media. His multidisciplinary work is influenced by both post-conceptual and digital art, and has been defined relational, immersive, and participatory. His practice explores the effects new media have on our societies, investigating the relationships between technology, the objects we create, our subjectivity, and the modes in which these relations unfold into each other.

== Biography ==
Casalegno was born in Naples, Italy and studied communication studies at Sapienza in Rome and Design Media Arts at UCLA.

In 2001 he co-founded with Giovanni D'Aloia the project Kinotek, a seminal VJing and live-media group based in Rome, among the first Italian collectives to use digital tools during their performances. In 2002 he collaborated with the duo Metaxu. In 2005 he collaborated with the electronic music composer Maurizio Martusciello in the audiovisual project X-Scape, presented at Mutek Festival in Montreal and IXEM in Venice.

His work often revolves around Deleuzian ideas. He reportedly manifested his interest in "painting the forces" and the use of audiovisual languages as "affections in their pure state". In an interview in 2010, discussing one of his projects, he alluded to the concept of ritornell in Deleuze and the capacity of structured sounds, notably rhythm, to define a space.

Casalegno's work often deploys technologies, ideas and aesthetics borrowed from science. He used EEG and Neurofeedback technologies in several installations and performances. His kinetic sculpture RBSC.01(2011–2014) is inspired by the RuBisCO enzyme, the most abundant protein on Earth. Talking about this piece, he stated: " After the disconnection from nature, desire is not coming from a lack of something, but out of production. [...] My machine is a kind of nothing in a way, because you need the symbol it produces to be within yourself. That symbol is this desire of transforming your environment in such egotistic and shortsighted ways. We might rationally conceive that we are going towards destruction, but we can’t escape to make ours what is outside of ourselves."

In other projects Casalegno tackles topics of ecology, system theory and biology, as in Strutture Dissipative (2009), "and the interactive audiovisual installation Il Gesto Sospeso, ideated in collaboration with the fashion designer Roberto Capucci and artist Maurizio Martusciello, and premiered at the Hadrian Temple for the Rome Fashion week in 2010.

In 2012 he designed a visualization of data from the NASA Exoplanet Science Institute as part of a site-specific performance by environmental artist Lita Albuquerque for the Knowledge Festival at the Mount Wilson Observatory in California. The durational performance was produced in collaboration with the LA Master Chorale and staged on one of bridges leading to the observatory.

In 2016 Casalegno produces the installation TWINS, inspired by Kinbaku, the Japanese art of bondage: "I like this idea of tying down some sort of freedom in order to induce a heightened state of awareness. You're tied your entire life. I like that state of mind, where you feel in danger. Your body is more open, in a way. [...] It might be a statement on the way we're living, on the relationship we have with technology. In the end, I’m interested in talking about what we do with technology – how we change with it."

In 2018 he created an immersive gastronomy project titled 'Aerobanquets RMX', inspired by the Italian Futurist's Cookbook. For this Mixed Reality project he collaborated with chef Chintan Pandya, food writer Gail Simmons, electronic musicians dj Spooky and Maurizio Martusciello, and restaurateur Roni Mazumdar.
