= Germana Marucelli =

Italian fashion designer (1905–1983)

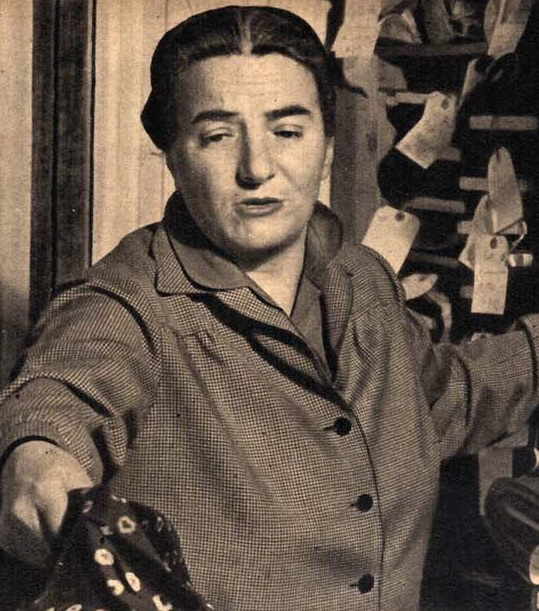
- Germana Marucelli in 1951
- Born: 13 October 1905; Settignano, Italy
- Died: 23 February 1983 (aged 77); Milan, Italy
- Occupation: Fashion designer

Germana Marucelli (13 October 1905 – 23 February 1983) was an Italian fashion designer.

== Life and career ==
Born in Settignano, Florence into a family of craftsmen, after the primary school at 11 years old Marucelli started working as an apprentice in her uncle's atelier, Chiostri. In 1925 she left Chiostri to work in another Florentine atelier, and in 1932 she was appointed director of Gastaldi tailoring in Genoa.

In 1938, Marucelli moved to Milan, where in via Borgospesso she opened her first atelier. During the war she was forced to abandon the atelier and to move in Stresa, guest of her friend and loyal customer Flora d’Elys. During the war years she conceived a new type of fashion, characterized by hourglass silhouettes, thus anticipating the New Look by Christian Dior. After the war, she came back to Milan and created the "Giovedì di Germana Marucelli" (i.e. "Thursdays by Germana Marucelli"), a series of Thursday cultural meetings which involved authors and artists.

In 1948, Marucelli collaborated with the painter and set designer Piero Zuffi for a collection inspired by surrealism, and the same year she was appointed production and advertising consultant of the textile company SNIA Viscosa. Thanks to this position she was then able to take over the Ventura atelier in Corso Venezia, where she opened her new atelier and workshop. In 1950, she founded and financed a poetry prize, the Premio San Babila.

In 1952, together with other designers such as Vincenzo Ferdinandi, Roberto Capucci the Sartoria Antonelli, the Atelier Carosa, Giovannelli-Sciarra, Polinober, the Sartoria Vanna, Jole Veneziani and sixteen sportswear companies and boutiques at the first historic show at the Sala Bianca of Palazzo Pitti in Florence. A very young Oriana Fallaci, sent by the weekly Epoca, told the news.

Between 1950s and 1960s, Marucelli established herself as one of the most important Italian fashion designers, with a style often inspired by classical and avant-garde figurative arts, such as the 1954 collection "fraticello" (i.e. "little friar"), inspired by the fifteenth century Tuscan painters, or the 1960 line "vescovi" (i.e. "bishops"), inspired by the sculptures of Giacomo Manzù. Other successful collections include the 1957 youthful line "Pannocchia", the 1963 transgressive line "Scollo a tuffo", and the 1965 line "Optical", she designed together with the kinetic artist Getulio Alviani.

In 1972, Marucelli made her last collection, then she semi-retired, continuing to dress only a limited circle of loyal customers, and opening a sewing school, restricted to her grandchildren and a few friends.
