= Emilio Schuberth =

Italian fashion designer

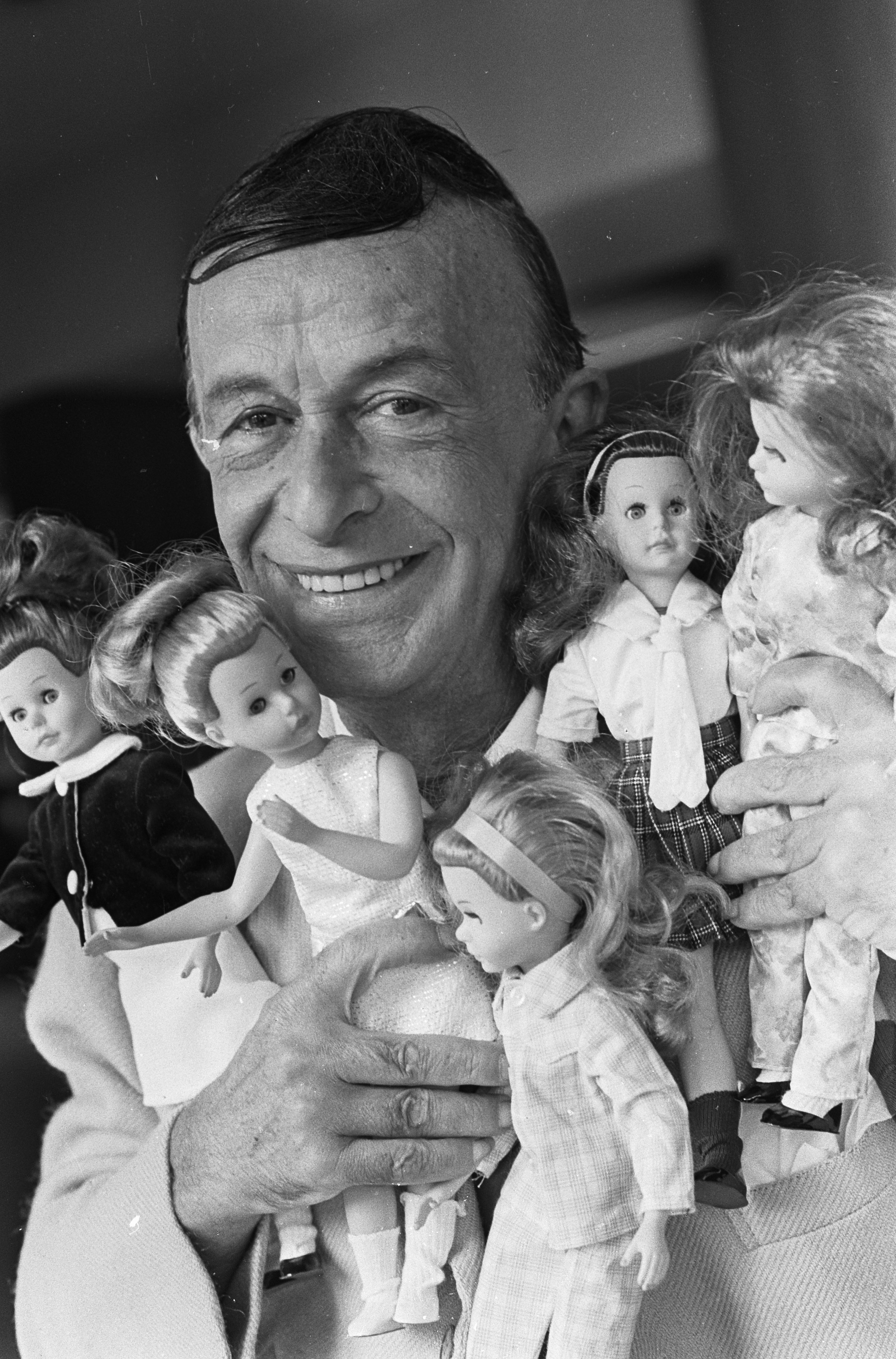
- Emilio Schuberth in 1967
- Born: Federico Emilio Schuberth; 8 June 1904; Naples, Italy
- Died: 5 January 1972 (aged 67); Rome, Italy
- Spouse: Maria JeIasi

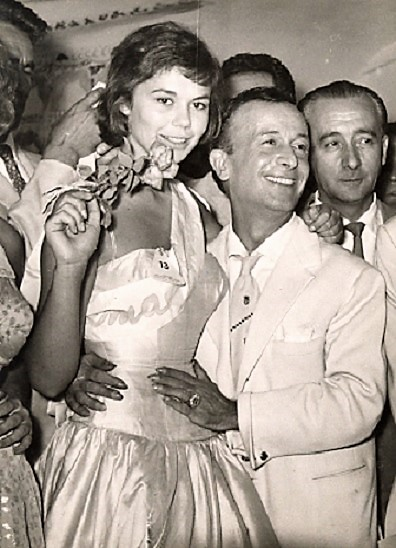
Emilio Schuberth with actress Giorgia Moll, 1955

Emilio Federico Schuberth (8 July 1904 – 15 January 1972) was an Italian fashion designer, popular in the 1940s and 1950s. Schuberth was called the "tailor of the stars", and his work was loved by many international celebrities like Princess Soraya of Iran, Rita Hayworth, Ingrid Bergman, Bette Davis, Brigitte Bardot, Sophia Loren, Gina Lollobrigida and Anna Magnani.

== Early life and education ==
He was born as Federico Emilio Schuberth on 8 June 1904 in the Vicaria neighborhood of Naples in Campania, Italy to parents Gotthelf and Fortunata Vittozzi. There were myths around his birth occurring in a Saxon castle which were untrue, however his father Gotthelf was Saxon. His mother Fortura was Spanish. He is said to have studied Painting at the Academy of Fine Arts in Naples, before pursuing fashion. In 1929 he married Maria Jelasi and together they moved to Rome where he apprenticed as a tailor at Montorsi tailor's workshop. Together the couple had two daughters.

In 1938, Schuberth opened a small millinery only designing couture hats and nothing ready-made, located on Via Frattina near the Spanish Steps in Rome. One of his hat clients was countess Ratti, a nephew of Pius XI, who suggested he open an atelier for women fashion serving the aristocracy. Early work from his fashion house he primarily offered knit separates ensembles for coastal vacations, and pared-down evening wear.

== History ==
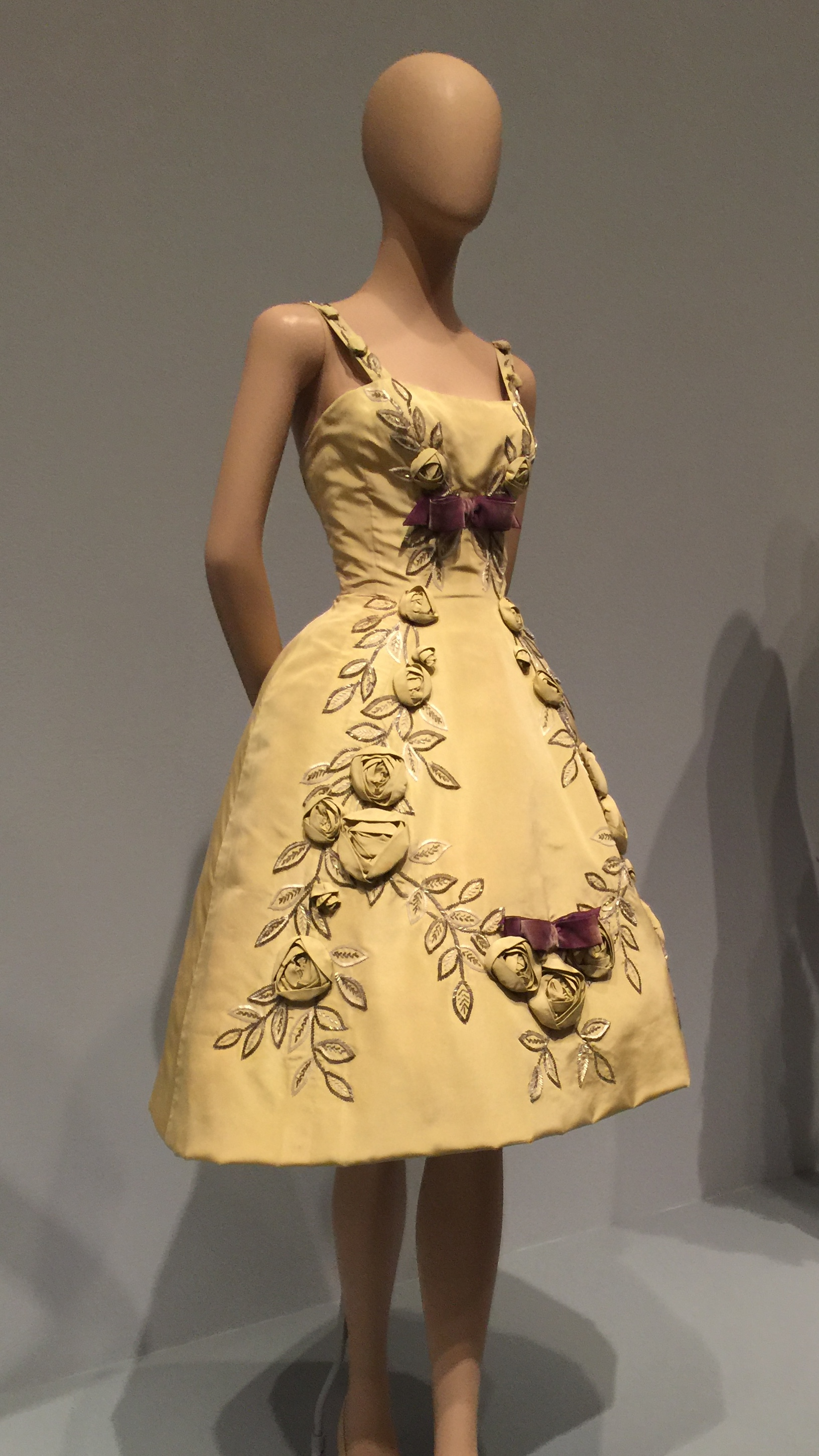
Cocktail dress by Emilio Schuberth, c.1961. (PMA)

In 1940 he established his own company, "Schuberth Emilio" located on via Lazio n. 9, however because of the popularity he moved locations within the same year to via XX Settembre n. 4, where his atelier remained. The inside of the atelier was designed and decorated similarly to the Parisian ateliers.

His clothing highlighted la bella figura, the Italian feminine ideal of “sensuality, grace, and love of leisure,” which was a popular aesthetic during the 1950s and often seen in Italian cinema from the postwar-era.

His popularity as a designer grew starting around December 1948 during the fashion show, French Fashion? Italian fashion at Casino de la Vallée in Saint-Vincent, Aosta Valley, Italy where he displayed his clothing alongside French designer Christian Dior and Dior d'Italia'. The historic debut of Italian fashion happened on February 12, 1951, at Villa Torrigiani the Florence home of Giovanni Battista Giorgini, where Schuberth's apparel designs were in attendance. Eventually this exposure lead to international buyers.

In 1953, he founded with many famous fashion designers including Alberto Fabiani, Vincenzo Ferdinandi, Sorelle Fontana, Jole Veneziani, Giovannelli-Sciarra, Mingolini-Guggenheim, Eleanora Garnett and Simonetta Colonna di Cesarò, the S.I.A.M. - Italian High Fashion Syndicate.

In 1955, he designed the wedding dress and trousseau of Maria Pia of Savoy, an Italian princess and daughter of King Humbert II.

== Death and legacy ==
He died from a heart attack in his home in Rome at the age of 67, on 5 January, 1972.

As a master of Italian fashion, his students included Valentino, and Roberto Capucci.

Schuberth's designs are held in the permanent collection at the Metropolitan Museum of Art, and the Philadelphia Museum of Art.
