= Sorelle Fontana =

Italian fashion house

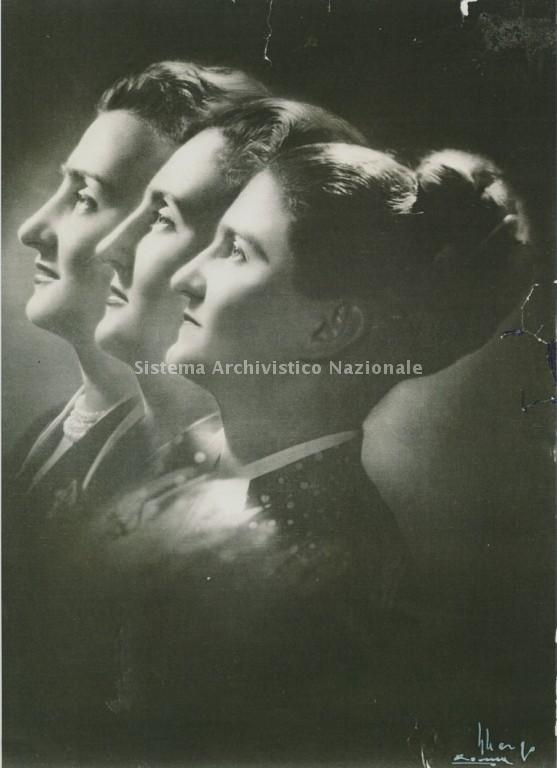
Portrait of Fontana Sisters: from left to right, Micol, Giovanna, and Zoe Fontana (1955)

Sorelle Fontana (literally "Fontana Sisters", also known as "Sorelle Fontana, Alta Moda SRL") is an Italian fashion house, specializing in production of high-fashion couture.

It was founded in Rome in 1943 by three sisters and Italian designers: Zoe Fontana (1911-1979), Micol Fontana (1913-2015) and Giovanna Fontana (1915-2004).

== History ==
Born in Traversetolo, Parma, the three Fontana sisters started working as dressmakers with their mother at a very young age. They moved to Rome in 1933 where they worked as apprentices in other tailoring and sewed clothes at home.

In 1907, the sisters inherited their grandmother's tailoring atelier.

In 1943, the sisters founded a high fashion atelier in Via Liguria initially inspired by Christian Dior's New Look. The turning point of their career happened in 1949, when Linda Christian bought a Sorelle Fontana dress for her wedding with Tyrone Power. From then on the Sorelle Fontana brand gradually raised in the international jet set. The sisters dressed many celebrities and several heads of state, including Elizabeth Taylor, Audrey Hepburn, Ava Gardner, Grace Kelly, Jacqueline Kennedy Onassis, Queen Soraya, Infanta Beatriz of Spain, Frederica of Hanover, Anita Ekberg and Joan Collins.

Their most famous creation was the provocative cassock dress that was worn by Ava Gardner inspired by the robes worn by Roman catholic priests, which had been approved by the Vatican before its release.

They founded the S.I.A.M. - Italian High Fashion Syndicate in 1953, along with many famous fashion designers such as Alberto Fabiani, Vincenzo Ferdinandi, Emilio Schuberth, Jole Veneziani, Giovannelli-Sciarra, Mingolini-Guggenheim, Eleanora Garnett, and Simonetta Colonna di Cesar.

In 1972, while continuing their production, they withdrew from official events of high fashion. After selling the company and the brand to an Italian financial group in 1992, Micol Fontana created the Micol Fontana Foundation in 1994.

A two-parts television mini-series based on the story of the fashion house, Atelier Fontana - Le sorelle della moda, was broadcast on Rai 1 in 2011. The sisters were portrayed by Alessandra Mastronardi (Micol), Anna Valle (Zoe), and Federica De Cola (Giovanna).

== In the popular culture ==
Ava Gardner wore Sorelle Fontana's dresses in many of her movies. Audrey Hepburn wore a Sorelle Fonatana's dress in the 1953 movie Roman Holiday.

As the designer of Margaret Truman's (daughter of U.S. President Harry S. Truman) wedding gown, Micol Fontana was invited to appear as a mystery guest on the April 15, 1956 episode of What's My Line? in New York City. The Truman wedding occurred a few days later on April 21, 1956 in Independence, Missouri.

In La Dolce Vita, the tightly moulded priest’s cassock wore by Anita Ekberg in St Peter’s basilica was designed by Sorelle Fontana.
