= Maria Antonelli (fashion designer) =

Italian fashion designer

- Born: 1903
- Died: 1969 (aged 65–66)
- Occupation: Fashion designer

Maria Antonelli (1903–1969) was an Italian fashion designer. A pioneer of Italian fashion design, Antonelli took part in the first Italian fashion shows.

== Early life ==
Maria Antonelli was born in 1903. She was apprenticed at Battilocchi Tailoring in Rome.

== Career ==
Antonelli founded her eponymous fashion house in 1930. In July 1951, together with other designers such as Vincenzo Ferdinandi, Roberto Capucci, the Atelier Carosa, Giovannelli-Sciarra, Polinober, Germana Marucelli and Jole Veneziani, she took part in the show organised by Giovanni Battista Giorgini in Florence that attempted to establish Italian fashion as a rival to France. Her designs have been described as having "minimalist silhouettes which pre-empted the 60s trend". She dressed the actresses Clara Calamai, Anna Magnani, and Alida Valli. In 1969, she took part in the Mare Moda festival, where her models were described by Antony King-Deacon of The Times as "thrashing about with their arms and legs in a sort of frenzied apathy. On they ran, harem-scarem, wiggle, scream, and they were gone."

== Death and legacy ==
Antonelli died in 1969. Her designs featured in the Victoria & Albert Museum's exhibition The Glamour of Italian Fashion 1945-2014 in 2014.
