= Epoca (magazine) =

Weekly news magazine in Italy (1950–1997)

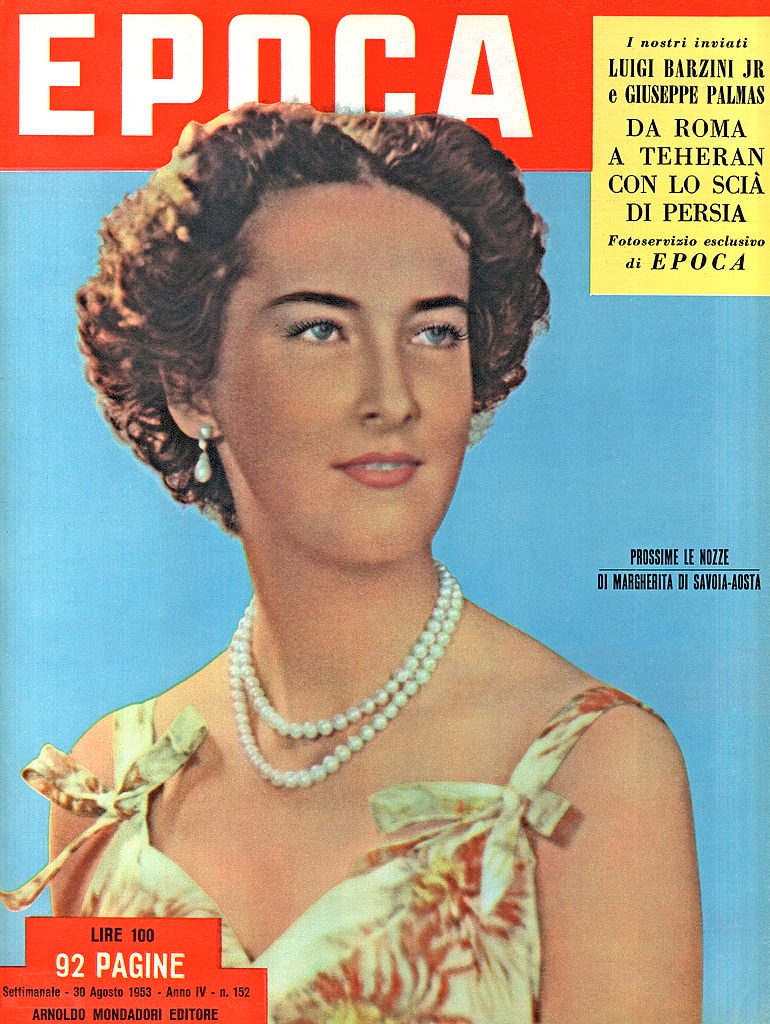
- 1953 cover featuring Margherita, Archduchess of Austria-Este
- Former editors: Alberto Mondadori; Enzo Biagi
- Categories: Current affairs magazine
- Frequency: Weekly
- Founded: 1950
- First issue: 14 October 1950
- Final issue: 25 January 1997
- Company: Mondadori; Rizzoli Editori
- Country: Italy
- Based in: Milan
- Language: Italian
- ISSN: 0013-9718
- OCLC: 1718813

Epoca (Italian: Age) was an illustrated weekly current events magazine published between 1950 and 1997 in Milan, Italy. It was one of the leading magazines during its run.

== History and profile ==
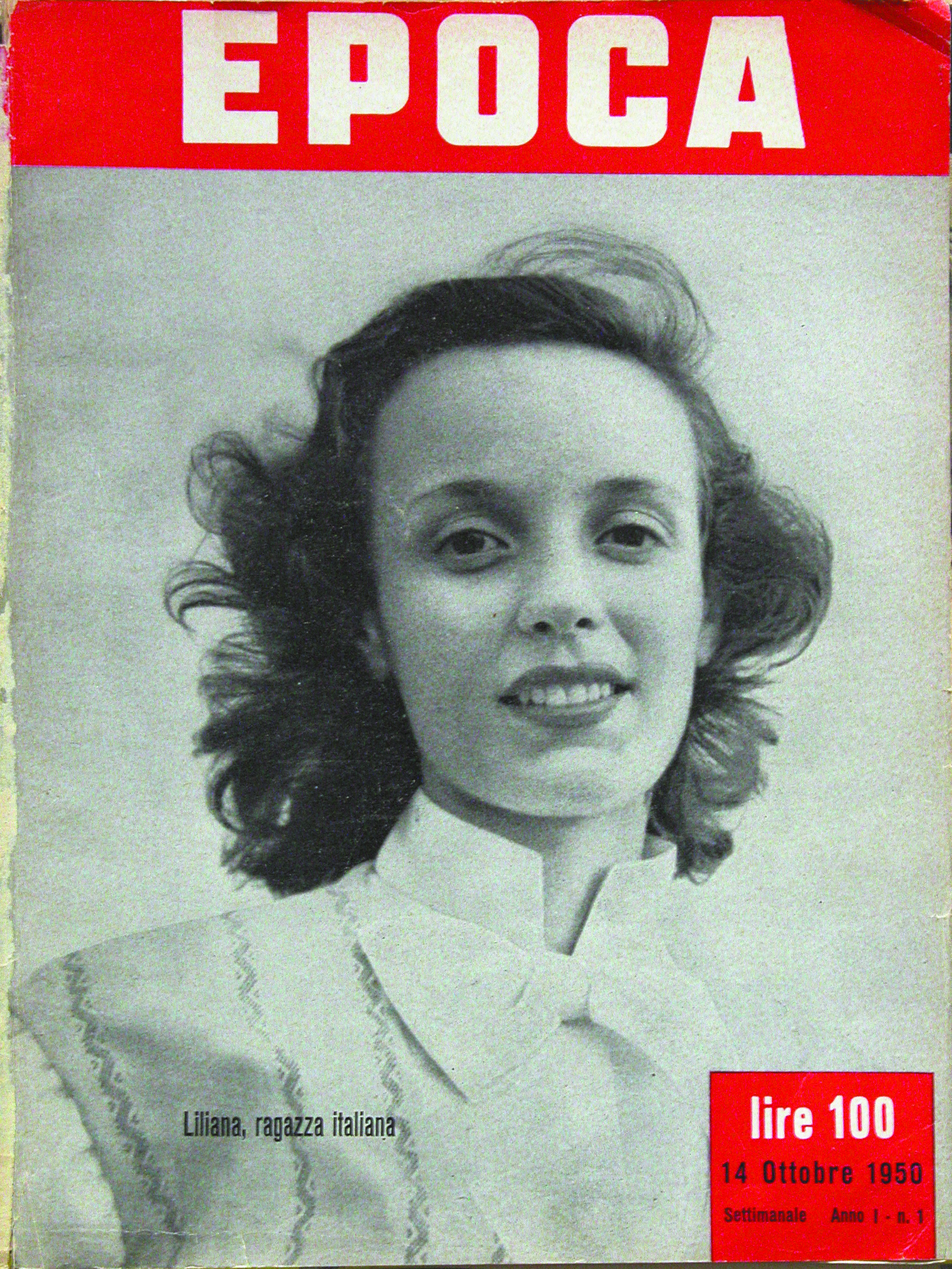
October 1950 issue of Epoca

Epoca was first published on 14 October 1950. The magazine was modeled on Life and Paris Match. Epoca was the first Italian publication which employed the illustrations like these and other popular magazines of the period such as Look.

Epoca was part of Mondadori and was based in Milan. Its first editor was Alberto Mondadori who was succeeded in the post by Enzo Biagi in 1953. During the period until 1960 when Enzo Biagi edited Epoca the magazine covered current affairs news, social attitudes as well as TV news. The magazine also included frequent and detailed articles about Hollywood stars of the period and Italian movie stars such as Gina Lollobrigida. The weekly had offices in New York City, Paris and Tokyo. From June 1952 to the late 1958 the Cuban-Italian writer Alba de Céspedes wrote an agony column, called Dalla parte di lei, in the magazine.

Then Epoca became part of Rizzoli Editori and began to cover travel and nature news with photographs and scientific articles. The magazine had a section called I bei posti (Italian: Beautiful Places) which featured the photographs of unknown places such as Bahamas, Marrakesh and Acapulco by Mario de Biasi, Alfredo Panucci and Giorgio Lotti.

Epoca was closed down in 1997 due to low circulation.

== Political stance ==
Epoca was established as a pro-American but also conservative magazine. In the period between 1952 and 1953 the magazine supported the Italian government. During the 1960s the magazine had a moderate political stance, but was extremely anti-communist. It was also culturally conservative during this period and considered miniskirts to be immoral clothing.

== Circulation ==
Epoca had a circulation of 150,000 copies in the period 1952–1953. The magazine sold 420,000 copies in 1955. Its circulation was 400,000 copies in 1963 and 305,000 copies in 1964. In 1970 the circulation of Epoca was 350,000 copies. The weekly had a circulation of 120,046 copies in 1984.

== See also ==
- List of magazines in Italy
