= Jole Veneziani =

Italian fashion designer

Jolanda Veneziani
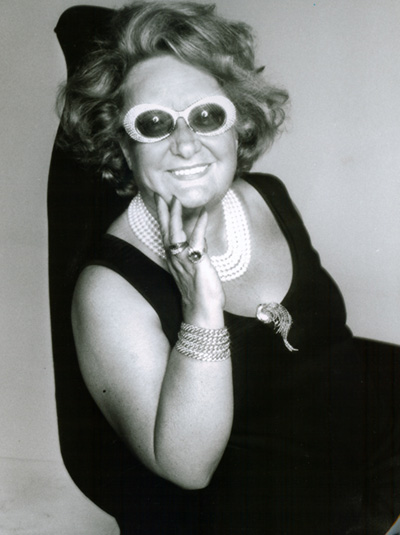
- Born: 11 July 1901; Taranto, Italy
- Died: 10 January 1989 (aged 87); Milan, Italy
- Known for: Haute couture

Jolanda Anna Maria Veneziani (11 July 1901 – 10 January 1989) was an Italian fashion designer.

== Biography ==
Born in Taranto in 1901, Jolanda moved to Milan with her family when she was still a child. She grew up in an artistic household where her father was a writer, her mother had a passion for classical music, and her brother was a screenplay writer. She studied accounting and started her career with the opening of a fur workshop.

At the height of the World War II despite many difficulties she grasped the desire for rebirth of the Milanese middle class and opened her refined atelier and then moved to via Monte Napoleone in 1943. Throughout the years that followed the designer cemented her fame as the pioneer of Made in Italy: in 1951 she participated in the famous fashion in Villa Torrigiani in Florence, she launched her Veneziani Sport collection and made the cover of Life magazine. Many famous divas like Marlene Dietrich and Maria Callas became her clients as well as personalities from Milanese high society.

In 1952, together with other designers such as Vincenzo Ferdinandi, Roberto Capucci, the Sartoria Antonelli, the Atelier Carosa, Giovannelli-Sciarra, Polinober, Germana Marucelli, the Sartoria Vanna and sixteen sportswear companies and boutiques at the first historic show at the Sala Bianca of Palazzo Pitti in Florence. A very young Oriana Fallaci, sent by the weekly Epoca, told the news.

She was the costume designer for the film Serenata al vento in 1956.

She worked as a consultant for Alfa Romeo to introduce new body colors and interior designs for the car manufacturer.

Her archives were entrusted to the foundation of Federico Bano in 1984, the Fondazione Bano onlus in Padua, and she officially retired from the fashion scene in 1985. A commemorative exhibition of her most prominent work was organized in October–November 2013 at the Villa Necchi Campiglio in Milan. The contemporary rooms of the Westin Palace Milan have framed sketches of Jole Veneziani.
