= Fashion Film Festival Milano =

Fashion film festival in Milan, Italy

Fashion Film Festival Milano is an international fashion film festival and cultural event that takes place annually during Milan Fashion Week in Milan, Italy in collaboration with Camera Nazionale della Moda Italiana. Founded in 2014 by Constanza Cavalli Etro, Fashion Film Festival Milano presents fashion film as a cinematographic product realized by the fashion industry as a communication and marketing tool. Since 2017, Fashion Film Festival Milano takes place as a hybrid event with digital screenings and in-person events that introduce fashion film to a global audience.

Logo Fashion Film Festival Milano

The festival is a platform for both established and emerging directors. In line with the festival's philosophy “The Big helps the Small”, FFFMilano provides fertile ground for new talents by showing their works that alongside those of renowned authors.

In recent editions, the festival screened an official selection of about 260 fashion films from more than 60 countries during a six-day event that features an international jury, an award ceremony celebrating winners and nominees of 15 award categories, feature film premieres, conversations with personalities from the creative industry, fashion organizations, activists, film directors, photographers, celebrities and special projects.

In its conversations and feature films premieres, the festival has encouraged the discussion of social values and the awareness of issues such as women's empowerment, sustainability, diversity and the support of young talent.

There are no fees for the submission of films or the participation in screenings and special events.

== Editions ==
=== 8th edition, 14–18 January 2022 ===
The eighth edition of the Fashion Film Festival Milano took place as a hybrid event with a mainly digital format, an in-person film screening and exhibitions, concurrently with Men's Fashion Week in Milan and in collaboration with Camera Nazionale della Moda Italiana. The jury was chaired by Valentino's creative director Pierpaolo Piccioli and included the fashion designers Stella Jean and Harris Reed, actress Alba Rohrwacher, Chiara Sbarigia, president of Istituto Luce-Cinecittà, photographer Nadia Lee Cohen, model and activist Lea T and Laura Brown, editor in chief of InStyle Magazine.

The program of the eighth edition was curated by 260 fashion films in competition, selected from more than 1.000 entries from 60 countries. It included three conversations: one with the fashion designers and founders of WAMI ("We Are Made in Italy") Stella Jean, Edward Buchanan and Michelle Ngonomo about the inclusivity of African culture in the Italian fashion Industry. There was also a conversation “Women In Film” between the president of Cinecittà Chiara Sbarigia, the writer and director Lisa Immordino Vreeland, director Alessandra Cardone and the journalist and writer Marta Stella. The "FFFMilanoForGreen" initiative featured a talk between Fanny Moizant, founder of the vintage and designer clothing platform Vestiaire Collective; Sara Maino, Head of Vogue Talents; and sustainable fashion designer Matteo Ward about building a better industry and reducing fashion's environmental impact and waste.

The nominated and winning films were presented in a digital awards ceremony and were announced on the occasion of two contemporary exhibitions open to the public at Triennale di Milano and MIAC – Museo dell’Audiovisivo e del Cinema of Cinecittà in Rome, Italy. The eighth edition closed with a screening of the documentary “Elio Fiorucci: Free Spirit” at Triennale di Milano.

=== 7th edition, 13–17 January 2021 ===
The seventh edition went online during five days of Men's Fashion Week and in collaboration with Camera della Moda Nazionale Italiana with a completely digital program. 200 fashion films, selected from 1000 entries from sixty countries, were presented in streaming on the festival's page on the CNMI's the website and the festival's official homepage.

The jury was chaired by art director and Oscar-nominated costume designer Tim Yip and included Lachlan Watson, Marcelo Burlon, Anna dello Russo, Milovan Farronato, Margherita Missoni, Paolo Roversi, Eliza von Guttman and Tamu McPherson. The #FFFMilanoForGreen and #FFFMilanoForWomen initiatives set the tone for a total of six conversations centered on sustainability and women's rights, including a discussion with the collective Girls in Film, while two directors’ talk introduced the streaming of the feature films "Halston" by Frederic Cheng and "Martin Margiela; in his own words" by Reiner Holzheimer.

The conversation with Javier Goyeneche and the screening of the three feature films, "Made in Bangladesh", "Let it be Law" and "I am Greta" put the theme of sustainability at the center of the seventh edition. At the digital awards ceremony "FFFMILANO Digital Awards", the nominated and awarded films were announced in video messages by the jurors, alternating with the messages of the winning directors, who received a digital version of the Fornasetti trophy.

=== 6th edition, 6–10 November 2019 ===
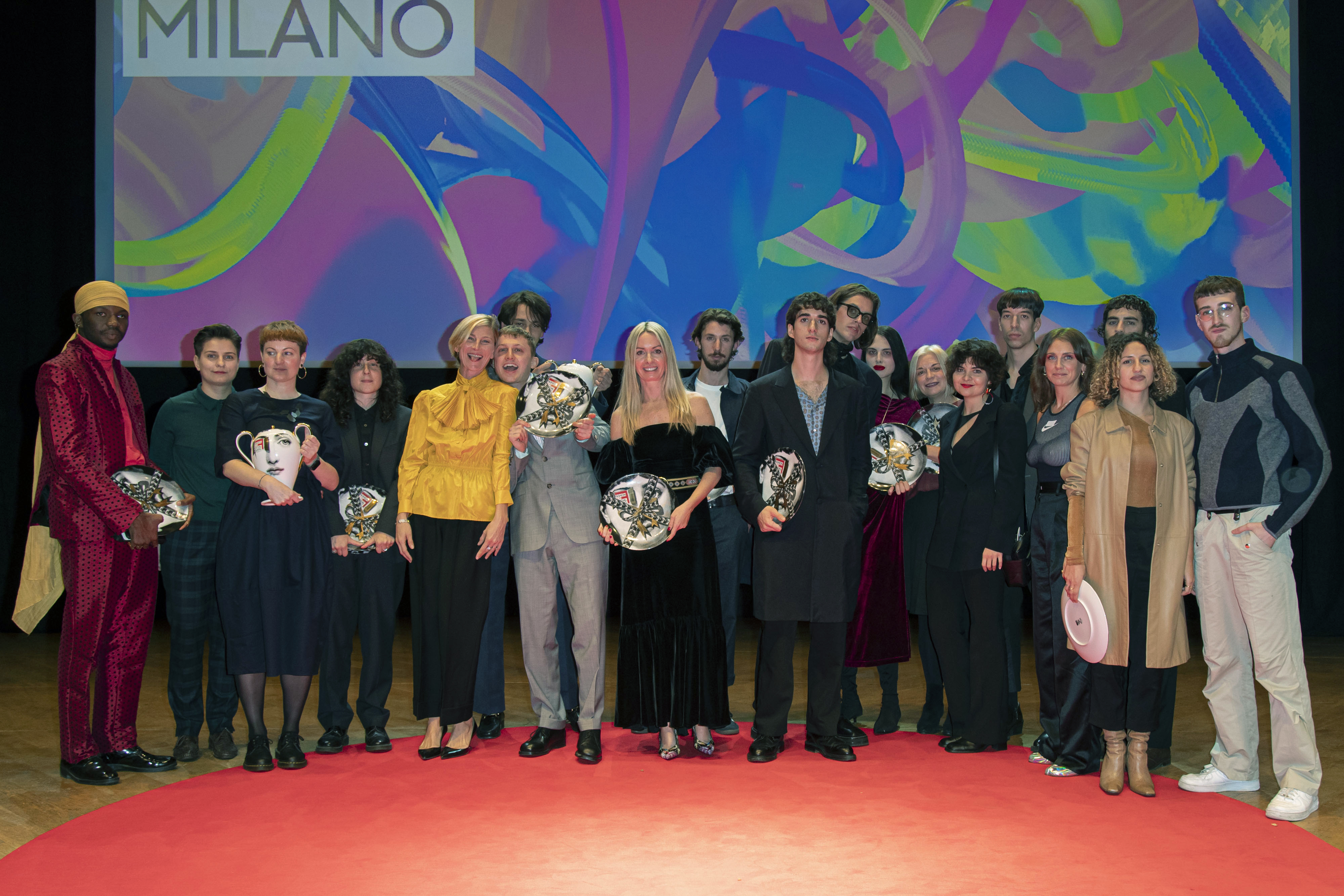
Winners of Fashion Film Festival Milano's 6th edition with Constanza Cavalli Etro (center)

The sixth edition inaugurated with the award ceremony Milan's Teatro dal Verme on November 6, 2019, and kicked off a five-day event from November 6–10. Inclusivity was the leading topic at this edition of the festival; several filmmakers explored the topic by questioning gender, race and disability. The contest featured 200 fashion films as the selection of 1000 entries from 50 countries, including films from Nigeria, China, Mexico, Finland and Iceland.

The jury was presided by fashion designer Giorgio Armani and included top model and human rights activist Waris Dirie, photographer Cass Bird, UNESCO ambassador for peace and sustainability and president of Instituto-E Oskar Mesavaht and curator Vicente Todolì. The edition featured the European and Italian premieres of “Peter Lindbergh: Women's Stories”, with an introduction by Paolo Roversi, Carla Sozzani and Alessia Glaviano and “The Times of Bill Cunningham”, introduced by director Mark Bozek.

The top model and founder of the Desert Flower Foundation Waris Dirie was appointed ambassador for the #FFFMilanoForWomen thematic section. Dirie held a conversation with actress and human rights activist Kiera Chaplin; followed by a talk between Mary Rozzi, founder of The September Issues magazine and Daria Bernardoni, editor-in-chief of the online magazine Freeda on “Independent Female Publishing”. The panel discussion “No Country for Women: How #GenerationEquality is breaking the rules within society” between Giorgia Roversi, Nicola Paòmarini and Francesca Vecchioni was accompanied by the film screening of “Fertility Day” by Sara Scamarcia and Paolo D’Orsogna.

The sixth edition in 2019 also featured the workshop "The Gaze of the Future Fashion Film Contest" in collaboration with Istituto Marangoni and with the participation of Constanza Cavalli Etro, Anna Dello Russo, Angelo Ruggeri and Andrea Pompilio as the jury, judging the 10 best videos produced by the students of Istituto Marangoni in Milan, Florence, London and Paris an awarding the film "In un mondo di etnie-chapter2" by Fabio Princigallo.

=== 5th edition, 20–25 September 2018 ===
With six days, the fifth edition was the longest festival's manifestation. It took place at Anteo Palazzo del Cinema from September 20–24 and organized its program according to two initiatives: "FFFMilanoForWomen" to promote the female universe and "FFFMilanoForGreen" to foster the discussion about environmental pollution caused by the fashion industry and the integration of innovative solutions.

The official selection featured 200 films selected from a total of 800 films received from 50 countries. There was a conversation between the art curator Caroline Corbetta, film director Alina Marazzi and Vicky Lawton, and a talk between Orsola de Castro, Hakan Karaosman, Marina Spadafora and Matteo Ward which tackled the perspectives of sustainable fashion, while the screening of “Riverblue” shed a light on the devastating effects caused by the production of fashion items.

A screening and talk with the special project for Vogue Italia “Through My Eyes Ep. III – Roots” showcased the films of three emergent film directors Andrea Pecora, Papa Omotayo and Eori Wakakuwa. There was a special screening of the film “We Margiela” and 500 VIP guests participated in the premiere of the documentary “McQueen”. The fifth edition closed with an award ceremony at Triennale di Milano. For the first time, the prize “Live the Moment Tribute” by Grey Goose was granted to director Virgilio Villoresi.

=== 4th edition, 23–25 September 2017 ===
The fourth edition took off with Milan's Fashion Week from September 23 to 25 and featured the screening of 160 fashion films in official selection chosen out of more than 800 submitted films from 50 countries. The fourth edition established the initiative "FFFMilanoForWomen" to present a strong and successful female universe and inaugurated with the premiere of the documentary "Franca: Chaos and Creation".

A conversation between Casey Legler, former Olympic swimmer and the first woman to have built a career as a men's clothes model and the president of the David di Donatello prize Piera Detassis. The collaboration with Vogue Italia renewned the project “Through my Eyes Ep. II – Women's View” with a conversation moderated by Alessia Glaviano and Clara Del Nero that explored the experience of female directors in the film industry. The initiative gained momentum with a series of three screenings with films by female directors.

The off-contest included a masterclass “From fashion to cinema and from cinema to fashion” with the costume designer Daniela Ciancio. The festival premiered Spike Jonze's and Natasha Lyonne's fashion films for Kenzo next to films by Spike Lee, Lola Schnabel, Martin Scorsesee and Lisa Immordino Vreeland. The model and actress Elisa Sednaoui presented her debut film “In conversation with Vogue Arabia” for Elie Saab.

=== 3rd edition, 24–26 September 2016 ===
The third edition ran from September 24 to 26 at Milan's Anteo Spazio Cinema with the inaugural screening and Italian premiere of the documentary film "Anna Piaggi: A Visionary In Fashion" directed by Alina Marazzi. The edition attracted 750 submissions from 50 countries after a cut down to 180 films was made by the artistic committee. Together with Vogue Italia the festival presented “Through My Eyes”, a special project showing short films made by emergent directors.

The off-contest saw four conversations: "Women in Cinema," a talk between director Alina Marazzi and writer and journalist Marta Stella; "Digital Insiders" a discussion with Simon Bekerman, Riccardo Conti, and Federico Sarica, founding editor of Rivista Studio; the conversation ”Fashion in Radio” between radio DJ La Pina and Nicoletta Morozzi; and a talk between founder of Purple Magazine, Olivier Zahm, and the curator Gloria Maria Cappelletti.

In collaboration with L'Archivio Nazionale Cinema d'Impresa the festival organized “Body&Garment”, a screening of experimental Italian films from the 60s and 70s directed by artists such as Bruno Munari, Ugo Nespolo and Mario Schifano. In collaboration with Discovery Channel the festival set up “FFFMilano Channel”, that ran from 10 September to 10 October 2016 as the first pop-up channel dedicated to fashion film. The third edition closed with an award ceremony at Triennale di Milano.

=== 2nd Edition, 20–22 September 2015 ===
The second edition opened Milan's Fashion Week with a three-day event from September 20 to 22 in 2015 at Anteo Palazzo del Cinema. The number of films submitted doubled to 600 entries from 45 countries, from which the festival's curator Gloria Maria Cappelletti and the festival's artistic committee selected 180 films for the competition. The jury included Vogue Editor-in-chief Franca Sozzani, British photographer and founder of Hunger Magazine Rankin, French director Bruno Aveillan and U.S. writer and director Lisa Immordino Vreeland, to name a few.

Films were screened across four different theatre rooms inside of Cinema Anteo, showcasing exclusive unreleased content, 15-second short films, films in official selections. The fourth room was reserved for three conversation: A conversation between Modesta Dziautaite, Patrizia Morosa and Lisa Immordino Vreeland; Alessia Glaviano, head of Global PhotoVogue interviewed Bruno Aveillan and the photographer Rankin. It also included a special screening on the occasion of Milano Film Festival that were held open-air at Parco Sempione and Triennale di Milano.

Starting with the second edition, the festival set up an online voting system that reported 3000 viewers who voted for the first time the winner of the “People's Choice Award”. For its second edition, the festival signed a sponsorship with Mercedes-Benz and won Paramount Pictures and MTV Italia as its media partner. Following the event, the festival was included in the exhibition “A-Z. Il nuovo vocabolario della moda italiana” at Triennale di Milano.

=== 1st Edition, 14–15 September 2014 ===
The first edition was launched in collaboration with the Italian Fashion Council, Camera Nazionale della Moda Italiana, and anticipated the Fashion Week in Milan with a two-day event from September 14–15, 2014. The jury was presided by Vogue Italia Editor-in-chief Franca Sozzani and included Oscar-winning film director Luca Guadagnino, Claudia Donaldson, Editor-in-chief of the video channel NOWNESS and fashion journalist Tim Blanks. In its first year, the festival awarded 14 categories: Standouts were Wes Andersons’ fashion film “Castello Cavalcanti” for Prada and Paolo Sorrentino's short movies series “Frames of Life” conceived for Armani. The emerging designer Rie Yamagata won three categories. The first edition presented 80 fashion films selected from 350 films submitted from 34 countries. It saw the participation of more than 4000 spectators.

== Awards ==
For every edition, Italian artist Fornasetti exclusively designs the trophies for Fashion Film Festival Milano. The festival organizes the competition in two categories “New Talents” and “Established Talents”, following the main principle to mutually support renowned and upcoming talents.

The current award categories are:

- Best Fashion Film
- Best Director
- Best Italian Fashion Film
- Best Experimental Fashion Film
- Best Documentary
- Best Styling
- Best Editing
- Best Music
- Best Photography
- Best Green Fashion Film
- Best New Fashion Film
- Best New Director
- Best New Italian Fashion Film
- Best New Designer/Brand
- People's Choice Award

== International Jury ==
Members to Fashion Film Festival Milano's international jury have included Oscar-winning film directors, renowned fashion designers, photographers and personalities from cultural industries spanning fashion, cinema, art and culture:

=== 2022 ===
- Pierpaolo Piccioli (President of FFM 2022 jury), Creative Director Maison Valentino
- Alba Rohrwacher, actress
- Laura Brown, Editor-in-chief Instyle Magazine
- Harris Reed, fashion designer
- Vincent Peters, photographer
- Chiara Sbarigia, President of Cinecittà
- Piero Piazzi, President of Women Management
- Nadia Lee Cohen, photographer and director
- Esteban Diacono, digital artist
- Lea T, top model and activist
- Stella Jean, fashion designer
- Arturo Galansino, Director Palazzo Strozzi
- Fanny Moizant, Founder of Vestiaire Collective
- Kerry Bannigan, Director Fashion Impact Fund

=== 2021 ===
- Tim Yip (President of FFFM 2021 jury), art director and Oscar-winning costume designer
- Lachlan Watson, actress
- Marcelo Burlon, Creative director
- Anna Dello Russo, journalist and influencer
- Milovan Farronato, curator
- Javier Goyeneche, Founder Ecoalf
- Margherita Missoni, fashion designer
- Paolo Roversi, photographer
- Elizabeth Von Guttman, Founder System Magazine
- Tamu McPherson, influencer

=== 2019 ===
- Giorgio Armani (President of FFFM 2019 jury), fashion designer
- Waris Dirie, top model and activist
- Ezra Petronio, Founder Selfservice Magazine
- Oskar Metsavaht, Founder and designer of Osklen
- Vicente Todolì, Artistic Director Hangar Bicocca
- Cristina Capotondi, actress
- Sissy Vian, stylist
- Cass Bird, photographer
- Angelo Flaccavento, fashion journalist

=== 2018 ===
- Anna Lily Amirpour, director
- Max Vadukul, photographer
- Caroline Corbetta, contemporary art curator
- Orsola de Castro, Founder Fashion Revolution
- Umit Benan, fashion designer
- Piera Detassis, journalist, essayist and film critic
- Nicoletta Santoro, stylist and creative director
- Pablo Arroyo, photographer and creative director
- Taz Vega, actress
- Bianca Balti, top model

=== 2017 ===
- Ilaria Bonacossa, Director MAAD, art historian and curator
- Carlo Capasa, President Camera Nazionale della Moda Italiana
- Eva Riccobono, model and actress
- Jim Nelson, journalist, former editor-in-chief GQ
- Federico Pepe, artist, graphic designer, publisher
- Sølve Sundsbø, fashion photographer and filmmaker
- Maria Luisa Frisa, art critic, fashion curator and Director of the degree course in Fashion Design and Multimedia Arts at Università Iuav di Venezia

=== 2016 ===
- Franca Sozzani (President of FFM 2016 jury), former Editor-in-chief Vogue Italia
- Claudia Llosa, director, winner of Golden Bear and Oscar nominee
- Michelangelo Di Battista, photographer and director
- Andrea Lissoni, Artistic director Haus der Kunst and curator
- Olivier Zaham, Founder Purple Magazine, photographer and director
- Miroslava Duma, digital entrepreneur
- Enrico Dorizza, entrepreneur
- Emanuela Martini, film critic

=== 2015 ===
- Franca Sozzani (President of FFM 2015 jury), former Editor-in-chief Vogue Italia
- Bruno Aveillan, filmmaker, photographer and contemporary artist.
- Lisa Immordino Vreeland, writer and director
- Rankin, photographer and director
- Mario Codognato, curator of contemporary art
- Sara Maino, Head of Special Projects Vogue Italia

=== 2014 ===
- Franca Sozzani (President of FFM 2014 jury), former Editor-in-chief Vogue Italia
- Luca Guadagnino, film director, producer, screenwriter.
- Jane Reeve, former CEO Camera Nazionale della Moda Italiana
- Claudia Donaldson, former Editor-in-chief NOWNESS
- Tim Blanks, Editor-at-large Business of Fashion

== Winning Films ==
=== 2022 ===
Title	Director(s)	Brand	Award(s)
A Night at the Museum	Byron Rosero	Moncler, NSS	Best Fashion Film, Best Music
The Magic of Suits	Virgilio Villoresi	Brunello Cucinelli	Best Italian Fashion Film
Iara	Florian Joahn	Vogue UK	Best Director
The Three Building Blocks	Miguel Thomé Oliari, Fernanda Pompermayer	Rocha	Best Editing
Ostal 24	Marine Serre, Sacha Barbin, Ryan Doubiago	Marine Serre	Best Photography
Evolver	Nin Bose, Nathan Collins, David Vigh	Bose Collins	Best Experimental Fashion Film
The Last Dance of Life	Claire Farin	DIDU	Best Styling
Back in the Island	Amanda Valle		Best Documentary
New World Order	Timur Celikdag	The Travel Almanac Magazine	Best Green Fashion Film, Best New Fashion Film
La Tassinara	Gregorio Franchett, Ilva Sapeha	Comio	Best New Italian Fashion Film
Soldaderas	Camila Arroyo	Sabrina OI	Best New Director
001 THE WALL COLLECTION 2021	Joyce NG	022397BLUFF	Best New Italian Designer/Brand
The Dreamers Room	Stefania Rocca	futuroRemoto	People's Choice Award

=== 2021 ===
Title	Director(s)	Brand	Award(s)
Le Mythe Dior	Matteo Garrone	Christian Dior Couture	Best Fashion Film, Best Music
The Life and Times of Mannequeen Town	Vincenzo Schioppa	Aspesi	Best Italian Fashion Film
Drag Syndrome	Jess Kohl	Vogue UK	Best Director
Silent Madness	Jordan Hemingway	Mowalola	Best Editing
Comfort Zone	Jordan Blady		Best Photography
Stories from a Twelfth-Floor Hotel Room	Zheqiang Zhang	Pseudonym	Best Experimental Fashion Film
WATA	Ronan Mckenzie, Joy Yamusangie	Gucci x GARAGE Magazine	Best Music, Best New Fashion Film, Best New Director
Gucci x Ssense	Matt Lambert	Gucci	Best Styling
Pelo Lacio	Diane Russo	Love Want Magazine	Best Documentary
Preservation Of Hezhen Fish Skin Tradition Through Fashion Higher Education	Zhongjin Zhang	Fishskinlab	Best Green Fashion Film
Embodiment	Ced Pakusevskiy	Barbara Bologna	Best New Italian Fashion Film, Best New Italian Designer/Brand
Brainwash	Paolo Forchetti	M1992	Best New Designer/Brand
Fur	Masha Butorina		People's Choice Award

=== 2019 ===
Title	Director(s)	Brand	Award(s)
72 hours in André Balazs’ Chateau Marmont with Kenneth Anger	Floria Sigismondi	System Magazine & Gucci	Best Fashion Film, Best Editing
Japan	Mario Sorrenti	Jil Sander	Best Italian Fashion Film
Nirvana	Jess Kohl	Nowness	Best Director, Best Documentary
The Twist	Lope Serrano AKA Canada	Miu Miu	Best Production
The Rite	Adam Csoka Keller	Nowness & The Royal Opera House	Best Photography
The Unseen	William Farr, Jon Emmony	Nowness	Best Experimental Fashion Film, Best Green Fashion Film
Captured Motion	Thibaut Grevet	Nike for Nowness	Best Music, Best New Fashion Film, Best New Director
JWA TV	Michael McCool	JW Anderson	Best Styling
Fashion in the Dark I	Emily Ford-Halliday		Best New Fashion Film
Where is Sunnei?	Van Khokhlov	Sunnei	Best New Italian Fashion Film
Udara	Daniel Obasi	Vlisco & Co	Best New Director
Untitled	Laurent Amiel	Marine Serre	Best New Designer/Brand
Body.Confy.Dance	Enea Colombi		Best New Italian Designer/Brand

=== 2018 ===
Title	Director(s)	Brand	Award(s)
Paused By	Wim Wenders	Jil Sander	Best Fashion Film, Best Director, Best Production, Best Photography
Prada Nylon Farm	Di-Al	Prada	Best Italian Fashion Film
Why Can't We Get Along	Benjamin Millepied, Aaron Duffy, Bob Partington	Rag & Bone	Best Editing, Best Experimental Fashion Film
Yo! My Saint	Ana Lily Amirpour	Kenzo	Best Music
Runaway Baby	Lola Bessis	Chloé	Best Styling, Best New Fashion Film, Best New Director
Muxes	Ivan Olita	Nowness	Documentary
Who Made My Clothes	Mj Delaney	Fashion Revolution	Best Green Fashion Film
Allegory of Water	Elena Petitti Di Roreto	Vogue Italia	Best New Italian Fashion Film
Kilon Shele Gan Gan	Dafe Oboro	Mowalola Studio	Best New Designer/Brand
Identity through Ferré	Federico Cianferoni	Fondazione Gianfranco Ferré	People's Choice Award

=== 2017 ===
Title	Director(s)	Brand	Award(s)
My Mutant Brain	Spike Jonze	Kenzo	Best Fashion Film, Best Director, Best Editing, Best Production, Best Photography, Best Music
Film Infinite Path	Francesco Torricella, Arice	Etro	Best Italian Fashion Film
Days of Being Mild	Robbie Hillyer Barnett	Ray-Ban	Best Experimental Fashion Film
Women in Uniform	Barbara Anastacio	Nowness	Documentary
Asymptote	Adam Csoka Keller, Evelyn Bencicova	Uniform	Best New Director, Best New Fashion Film
MONO – Y	Enrico Poli	Antonio Labroca	Best New Italian Fashion Film
Ethetics Episode 2: Mdingi Coutts	Amber Moelter	Lukhanyo Mding, Nicholas Coutts	Best New Designer/ Brand
Dilemma	Bonasia & Narcisi		People's Choice Award

=== 2016 ===
Title	Director(s)	Brand	Award(s)
Snowbird	Sean Baker	Kenzo	Best Fashion Film
Fragments d'un discours amoreux	Brigitte Niedermair		Best Italian Fashion Film
Albert The Dog	Pensacola	Ray-Ban	Best Director
Couples	Marcus Linner, Daniel de Viciola	Converse	Best Editing
Take Flight	Daniel Askill	The New York Times	Best Production
The Coded Body	Luke Clayton Thompson		Best Experimental Fashion Film
Migratory	Chantal Anderson	Objects Without Meaning	Best Photography
Three Women Arrive	Marie Schuller	Vogue Italia	Best Music, Best Styling
Ebonics	Luke Clayton Thompson	Grace Wales Bonner	Best New Designer/Brand
Omi Water	Papa Omotayo	Maki Oh	Best New Director
Valentino Fantastic Animals	Chris Edser	Valentino	Best Animation
Blue And You	Emma Westenberg		Best New Fashion Film
Becco di Rame	Melany		Best New Italian Fashion Film
In and Out of Control	Emir Eralp	Nowness	People's Choice Award

=== 2015 ===
Title	Director(s)	Brand	Award(s)
Legs are not doors	Harley Weir	Proenza Schouler	Best Fashion Film
Celia Birtwell	Virgilio Villoresi	Valentino	Best Italian Fashion Film
Jumper	Justin Anderson	Jonathan Saunders	Best Established Director
X	Rankin, Vicky Lauton, David Allain, Bronwen Parker-Rhodes, Trisha Ward, Jo Hunt	Coco de Mer	Best Editing
The Driver	Michael Pitt	Rag & Bone	Best Production
Blowing Riccardo	Marie Vic	Riccardo Tisci	Best Statement Fashion Film
Memory Imagination Reason	Jonas Lindstroem	Kostas Murkudis	Best Photography, Best Music
High Tide	Albert Moya	Dries Van Noten	Best Styling
Pippin and the Pursuits of Life	Femke Huuderman	Maaike Fransen	Best New Designer/Brand, Best New Director, Best New Fashion Film
Workout	Priscilla Santinelli		Best New Italian Fashion Film
Immaculate High	Wiissa	Stoned Immaculate Vintage	People's Choice Award

=== 2014 ===
Title	Director(s)	Brand	Award(s)
The Purgatory of Monotony	Ace Norton	Rhié	Best Fashion Film, Best Art Direction, Best New Talent Director
Leakage	Giulia Achenza		Best Italian Fashion Film
The Wall	Dominick Sheldon	several/many	Best Young and Established Director
Escandalo	Dean Alexander	Karla Colletto Swimwear	Best Editing
Noir	Marie Schuller		Best Styling
Play to Win, a Pingpong Battle	Roberto Delvoi	Andrea Pompilio	Best Music
Agi & Sam	Edward Housden	Agi & Sam	Best Emerging Designer

== Feature films ==
The festival's official program shows the best features films dedicated to honor important figures in the fashion industry and promote awareness of societal topics such as sustainability ("FFFMilanoForGreen"), women empowerment ("FFFMilanoForWomen") and young talents ("FFFMilanoForYoung"). Past editions have screened the Milanese, Italian or European premiere of documentaries.

Title	Year	Director(s)	Production country
Elio Fiorucci-Free Spirit	2017	Andrea Servi, Swan Bergman	Italy
A Folk Horror Tale	2021	Oliver Dahan	France
Step into Paradise	2021	Amanda Blue	Australia
Now	2020	Jim Rakete	Germany
Martin Margiela In His Own Words	2019	Reiner Holzemer	Germany, Belgium
Halston	2019	Frédéric Tcheng	United States
I am Greta	2020	Nathan Grossman	Sweden
Made in Bangladesh	2019	Rubaiyat Hossain	Bangladesh, France, Denmark, Portugal
Let It Be Law	2019	Juan Solanas	Francia, Argentina, Uruguay
The Times of Bill Cunnigham	2018	Mark Bozek	United States
Peter Lindbergh: Women's Stories	2019	Jean-Michel Vecchiet	Germany
McQueen	2018	Ian Bonhôte, Peter Ettedgui	United Kingdom
RiverBlue	2017	Roger Williams, David McIlvride	Canada
Franca – Chaos and Creation	2016	Francesco Carrozzini	United States, Italy
Anna Piaggi: una visionaria nella moda	2016	Alina Marazzi	Italy, Switzerland, Germany

== Structure ==
The festival is directed by Constanza Cavalli Etro. She is married to the Italian fashion designer Kean Etro, whom she followed to live in Milan, Italy, where she founded Fashion Film Festival Milano. Born in Argentina, she started her professional career in Mexico, where she founded the production and public relations agency CavalliCommunicacion and co-founded Mexico's Fashion Week.

Cavalli Etro was among the organizers of the first film festival in Argentina ("Festival Argentino de Cine) and in 2022 she co-founded "LAFA", the first Fashion Awards in Latin America.

Constanza Cavalli Etro appeared in Sheikha Intisar AlSabah's book "Circle of Love" (2019) as one of the women who are changing the international fashion and cultural scene. Forbes Italy named her as one of the 100 Successful Women of 2020 in Italy.

== See also ==
- List of fashion film festivals
