= List of fashion film festivals =

Fashion Film Festival (or FFF) is an international film festival focusing on, but not limited to, fashion films.

Fashion films were shown as early as 1911 in the Pathé newsreels, and festivals dedicated to them only appeared in 2000s.

For example, FashionTV Russia channel introduced a nomination for its annual Fashion Summer Awards "Fashion Film Festival".

== List of Fashion film festivals ==
Below is a list of international fashion film festivals that have toured major international events and received international media coverage, in chronological order of their emergence around the world:

Name	Est.	City	Organizer
Fashion in Film Festival or FFF	2006	London	Central Saint Martins
You Wear it Well Festival	2006	Los Angeles	Diane Pernet
A Shaded View on Fashion Film or ASVOFF	2008	Paris	Diane Pernet
La Jolla Fashion Film Festival	2012	La Jolla	Fred Sweet
Berlin Fashion Film Festival or BfFF	2012	Berlin	Philipp Ulita
London Fashion Film Festival or Lfff	2014	London	Beatrice Bloom
Fashion Film Festival Milano or FFFMILANO	2014	Milan	Constanza Cavalli Etro
Miami Fashion Film Festival or Miafff	2014	Miami	Grace Castro
Fashion Film Festival Istanbul or FFFISTANBUL	2015	Istanbul	Tuna Yilmaz
Buenos Aires International Fashion Film Festival or BAIFF	2015	Buenos Aires	Willmer Williams
Santiago International Fashion Film Festival or SFFF	2015	Santiago	Carlos Cabezas
Sarajevo Fashion Film Festival or sfff	2015	Sarajevo	Consortio civium Invictum
Cinettica Fashion and Art Film Festival or Cinettica	2017	Mexico City	Dfaniks
Fashionclash Fashion Film Festival or FASHIONCLASH or FFFF	2017	Maastricht	Branko Popovic
Be In Open Films or BIOF+	2018	Moscow	Alex Bazhenov
Canadian International Fashion Film Festival or CANIFFF	2016	Toronto	Roger Gingerich
La Boheme Cinema or International Film Festival of the La Boheme Magazine	2022	Moscow	La Boheme Magazine
World Fashion Shorts or WFS	2023	Moscow	Fashion Fund
