= Golden Spindle =

Russian fashion industry award

National Russian Award in the field of the fashion industry "Golden Spindle"
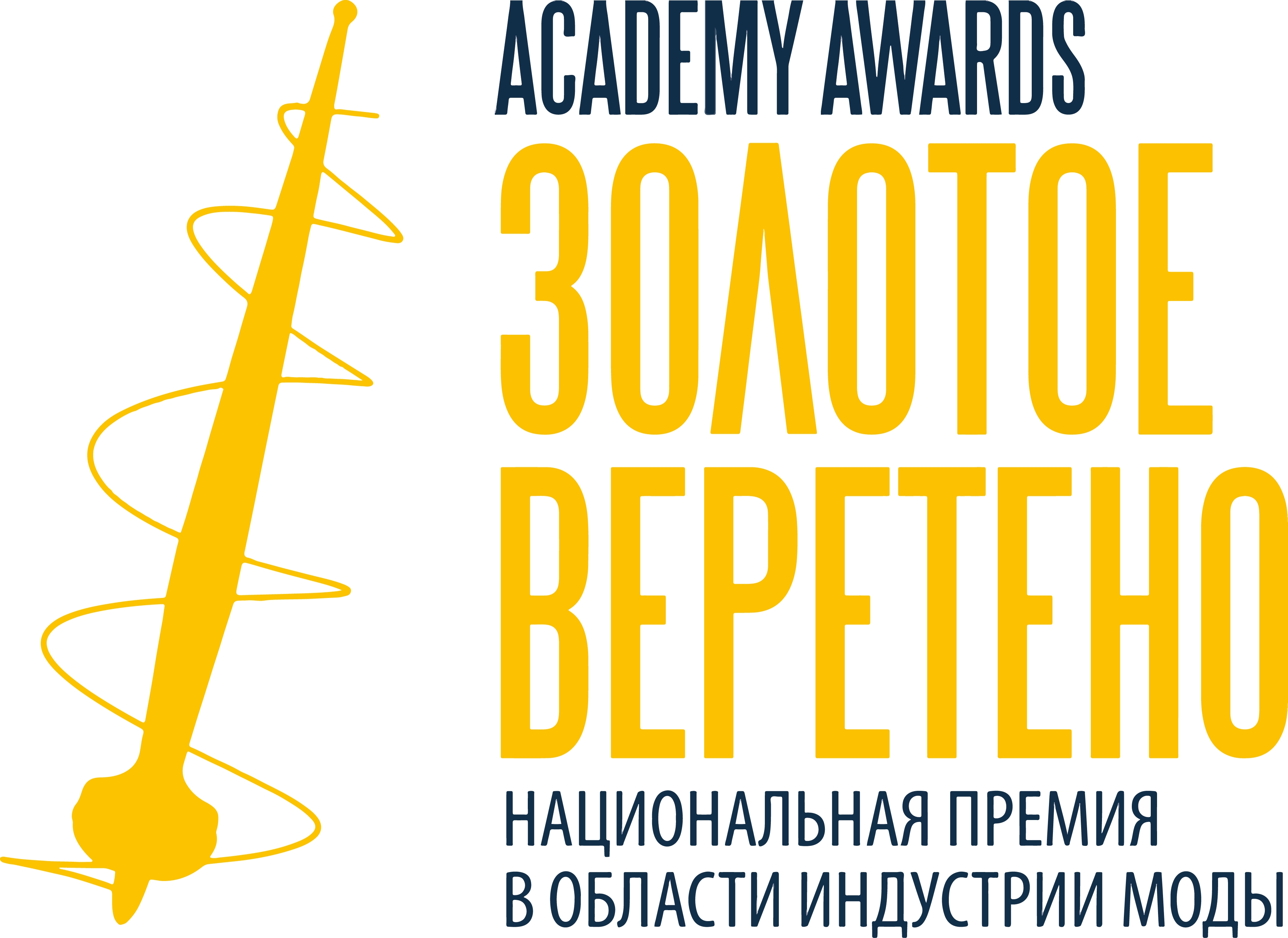
- Национальная премия в области индустрии моды «Золотое веретено»
- Awarded for: Excellence in the Russian fashion industry
- Country: Russia
- Presented by: Interregional Public Organization "National Academy of Fashion Industry"
- First award: 2003
- Website: fashion-academy.ru/award

The Golden Spindle is a Russian award in the field of the Russian fashion industry that has been awarded since 2003, when it was first presented as part of the Velvet Seasons Festival.

Since 2009, it has been awarded by the National Academy of the Fashion Industry.

The co-founders and co-organizers of the ceremony at various times were the Ministry of Industry and Trade of the Russian Federation, Chamber of Commerce and Industry of the Russian Federation, and the Russian Union of Textile and Light Industry Entrepreneurs.

Over the years, the number of award nominations has varied from five in 2003 to 34 in 2020.

== Awards events ==
From 2003 to 2012, the award ceremony was held at the Winter Theater in Sochi.

In 2013–2014 – in the Marble Hall of the Konstantinovsky Palace in Saint Petersburg. In 2015 – in the Sochi Olympic Park. In 2016–2019 – at the Expocentre in Moscow. In 2020, it was presented at the Mir Concert Hall in Moscow. Over the years, the winners of the award were Vyacheslav Zaitsev, La Boheme Magazine, and others.

== See also ==
- List of fashion awards
