= La Boheme Magazine =

Russian literary and art magazine

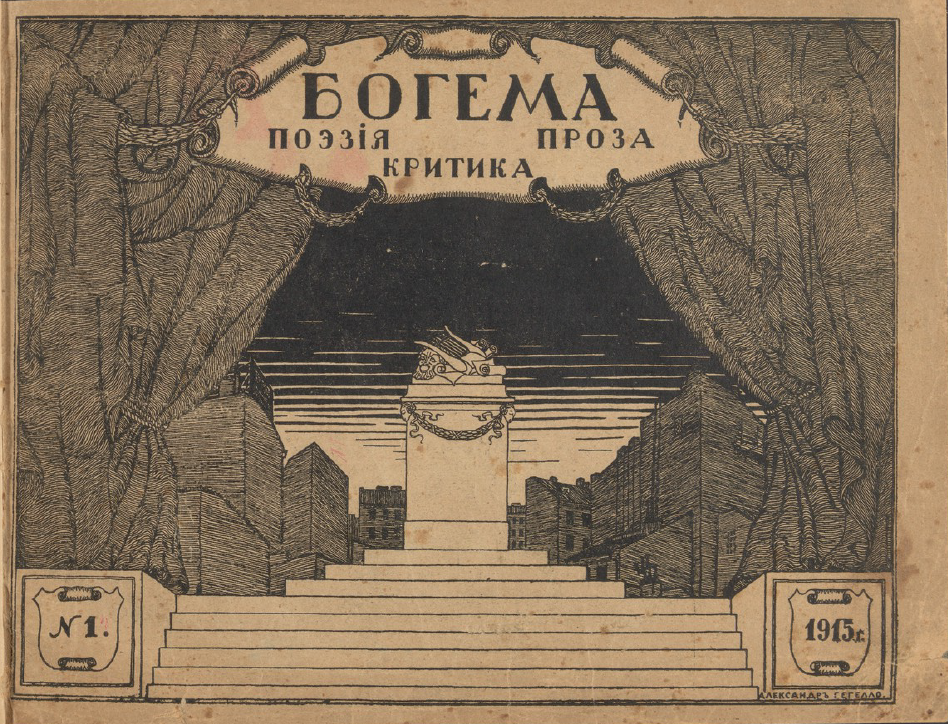
- Publisher: M. Silin, S. Cheremkhin, A. Lapitsky, V. Ananishnev
- Founded: 1915
- First issue: 1915
- Company: Moscluster LLC
- Country: Russia
- Language: Russian
- Website: laboheme.moscluster.com
- ISSN: 2658-5774

La Bohemе Magazine (Russian: Журнал "Богема") is a Russian literary and art magazine founded in 1915.

== History ==
The journal was published in 1915 in the publishing houses of M. Silin (No. 1–3), S. Cheremkhin (No. 4) and A. Lapitsky (No. 5–6). The editorial office was located in the apartment of Mikhail Reisner in Petrograd (Zagorodny Prospekt, 40, apt. 11).

The magazine was closed "for freethinking" after the sixth issue. In November 1915, it was revived by the Reisners under the name "Rudin". Produced until 1916, 8 issues were published.

Poets and writers L. Reissner, V. Zlobin, A. Lozina-Lozinsky, P. Ezersky, A. Balagin, V. Kholodkovsky published their works in the journal; artists A. Gegello, P. Shillingovsky, S. Skernovitsky, L. Slendzinsky, L. Rudnev, N. Lermontova and others.

In 1993, the publication was registered with Roskomnadzor. In 2017 it was registered by Moscluster.com with Roskomnadzor as an electronic media on the Internet.

The magazine is the official information partner of the Russian Gentry assembly, Mercedes-Benz Fashion Week Russia, Estet Fashion Week, FashionTV Russia "Fashion Summer Awards".

In 2022, the Russian video hosting Rutube Verified channel with the video version of La Bogeme Magazine. The video version of the magazine included such well-known fashion figures as Slava Zaitsev, Sergey Zverev, and also artists and actors Sergey Filin, Svetlana Zakharova (dancer), Alice Mon, etc.

La Boheme magazine has its own events in the field of fashion and culture (ecosystem of the magazine):

La Boheme Awards, which is included in the voluntary certification system of the Russia Rosstandart;

La Boheme Cinema, which is included in the state List of film festivals in Russia of the Ministry of Culture (Russia) in 2023, 2024, 2025; and is a fashion film festival.

etc.

== Editor-in-Chief ==
- A.A. Zueva
- G. Rozov
- Vladislav Ananishnev – publisher – winner of the FashionTV Russia award, member of the International Federation of Journalists.

== Honours ==
Professional honors and awards

Year	Nomination	Award
2020	Edition	National Fashion Industry Award "Golden Spindle
2022	Information partner	Neva Fashion Awards (Award of Neva Fashion Week)
2023	Fashion magazine	International Award in the field of beauty and health "Grace"
