= Betony Vernon =

American jewelry designer based in Paris

- Born: August 15, 1968 (age 57); Tazewell, Virginia
- Education: Virginia Commonwealth University, Domus Academy
- Occupation: Designer
- Known for: Design and sexual anthropology
- Labels: B.V. Betony Vernon, Paradise Found Fine Erotic Jewelry
- Spouse: Barnaba Fornasetti (married 2004–2014)

Betony Vernon (born August 15, 1968) is an American jewelry designer based in Paris. She produces luxurious erotic jewelry.

== Early life and education ==
Born in Tazewell, Virginia, Vernon is the third of four daughters. Her mother Ann Dearsley Vernon, was a British civil rights activist and art historian, and her father was an American pilot and inventor.

In 1990 she graduated cum laude from Virginia Commonwealth University with a degree in Art History and a double minor in Religious Studies and Goldsmithing.

After graduation, Vernon moved to Florence, Italy, to direct the metal-smithing program at Fuji Studio Art Workshop.

In 1992, Vernon developed her first erotic jewelry collection, naming it Sado-Chic.

After 5 years in Florence, she moved to Milan. Here she earned a master's degree in Industrial Design from Domus Academy. At the same time she founded her first design studio “Atelier B.V.” in Milan and she created one-of-a-kind objects for Luisa Via Roma.

== Career ==
In 1995 and 1998 she designed table objects for Florentine silversmith Pampaloni. During that time, she was also appointed as Design Director for the Italian interior design house Fornasetti.

Vernon has collaborated with several fashion designers, including Missoni, Alain Tondowski, Gianfranco Ferré and Jean-Paul Gaultier. In 2006, she designed a neckpiece for Swarovski’s Runway Rocks project that was later used by Lady Gaga for her Paparazzi video.

In 2006, Vernon worked with Los Angeles-based photographer Jeff Burton in the museum house of Carlo Mollino in Turin, Italy.

Vernon made “L’Envol” in 2008, a short video for SHOWstudio and her first collaboration with Nick Knight. Betony wrote, hosted, and co-produced “The Boudoir” for MTV Italy. The episodes aired on Love Line, a show dedicated to sexual education.

In November 2012, Vernon designed the Origin Chair, a functional sculpture carved in statuary marble from Monte Altissimo, Italy. It was unveiled in December 2012 at the Triennale Museum of Design and has since traveled to MUDAC - Museum of Design and Contemporary Art, Lausanne. In November 2015, the work was exhibited in Vernon's carte blanche for the Gewerbemuseum, Winterthur.

In 2017, Vernon unveils her Boudoir Box (1999-2000, leather case and sterling silver objects) for the first time to the general public as part of the Medusa exhibition at the City of Paris Museum of Modern Art.

In her Paris atelier she receives clients for bespoke fittings.

== Personal life ==
From 2004 to 2014, Vernon was married to Barnaba Fornasetti, son of Piero Fornasetti. She lives in Paris, France.

== Exhibitions ==
- 1993 - Primordi, international design, Triennale, Milan
- 1995 - Anni 90, Arte a Milano, Triennale, Milan
- 1999 - Il Classico, Norma e Variazione, Abitare il Tempo, Verona, Italy
- 2003 - Body Craze Selfridges, London
- 2005 - Touch Me, Victoria & Albert Museum, Contemporary Gallery, London
- 2008 - Sex in Design, Design in Sex, Museum of Sex, New York
- 2009 - Red Light Design - Salone del Mobile, Milan
- 2009 - The Fashion Body - Somerset House, London
- 2011 - Alta Rom Alta Moda - Casanatense Library, Rome
- 2012 - Selling Sex - SHOWStudio, London
- 2013 - KAMA - Sex and Design, Triennale Design Museum, Milan
- 2013 - GRASSI Museum of Applied Arts, Leipzig, Germany
- 2015 - Nirvana - Mudac, Lausanne
- 2016 - Nirvana - Gewerbemuseum, Winterthur
- 2016 - Body - Anthropogenicbody, Wroclaw, Poland
- 2017 - Medusa - Musée d'Art Moderne de la Ville de Paris, France

== Bibliography ==
- Vernon, Betony (2013). The Boudoir Bible: The Uninhibited Sex Guide for Today. Rizzoli. ISBN 978-0847840168.
