= Mercedes-Benz Fashion =

Series of fashion events sponsored by Mercedes-Benz

The fashion statement of the monokini made by Minimale Animale on the runways of Mercedes Benz Fashion Week in 2014.

Mercedes-Benz Fashion Week is a series of international fashion weeks sponsored by Mercedes-Benz, a brand of Daimler AG, and backed by IMG, a brand of TKO Group Holdings, among other partners. Designers featured during Mercedes-Benz Fashion Weeks include notable designers such as Rosenthal Tee, Mary Katrantzou and David Koma.

== Mercedes-Benz Fashion ==
Mercedes-Benz Fashion is a "fashion engagement programme" based in Stuttgart, Germany, a supplementary initiative of German automotive manufacturer Mercedes-Benz.

The automotive provider partners with select fashion weeks and events internationally, devises programmes to support fashion creatives and provide sponsorship.

The brand is active at approximately 80 fashion events in nearly 40 countries, including the International Festival of Fashion Photography and Fashion Accessories in Hyères, France.

In 2009, Mercedes-Benz Fashion established the Mercedes-Benz International Designer Exchange Program, later renamed the Mercedes-Benz Fashion Talents.

The 2022 edition of Mercedes-Benz Fashion Week Russia was cancelled due to the ongoing Russian invasion of Ukraine.

== Fashion Weeks ==
=== Locations ===
- Berlin, Germany (organized by IMG Worldwide, LLC)
- Colombo, Sri Lanka (organized by CFW Holdings Pvt. Ltd)
- Istanbul, Turkey (organized by İHKİB)
- Madrid, Spain (organized by IFEMA)
- Mexico City, Mexico (organized by COLOüRS México)
- Miami, Florida (organized by IMG Worldwide, LLC)
- New York City, New York (organized by IMG Worldwide, LLC)
- Russia (organized by IMG Worldwide, LLC)
- Tbilisi, Georgia (organized by BENEXT and Georgian Fashion Foundation)

In addition to the Fashion Weeks listed above, Tokyo Fashion Week was previously branded as Mercedes-Benz Tokyo Fashion Week for 10 years until 2016 when Amazon.com replaced Mercedes-Benz as title sponsor.
