= Costume National =

Italian fashion house

- Company type: Privately held
- Industry: Fashion
- Founded: 1986; 40 years ago Milan, Italy
- Headquarters: Milan, Italy
- Products: Ready to Wear, Accessories, Eyewear, Perfume
- Website: www.costumenational.com

Costume National is an Italian fashion house, founded in 1986 by Ennio Capasa, creative director, and his brother Carlo Capasa, CEO. Costume National's head office is located in Milan, Italy. The company produces clothing under the brands Costume National, Costume National Homme (for men) and C’N’C (an avant-garde “street-couture” line) as well as scents including The Trilogy, Scent Gloss, Scent Cool Gloss, Intense, 21, and Homme.

== History ==
The company was founded in 1986 in Milan by Ennio Capasa, who worked in Japan as an assistant to Yohji Yamamoto, and his brother Carlo Capasa. Its first womenswear collection was presented in Milan in the same year. In 1991, the ‘Woman Collection’ was presented in Paris. Between 1995 and 1998 the fashion house opened stores in Milan, New York City, Rome, Los Angeles and Paris.

In 2000, a menswear collection was streamed online in collaboration with Kataweb. Over the following three years, the company extended its range of products to include perfumes, eyewear, ready to wear apparel and footwear, plus accessories targeted at the younger generations.

== Distribution and Production ==
=== Costume National ===
The company's Thiene factory is responsible for men's and women's Ready To Wear production. The factory is mainly responsible for the cutting room, pattern-making, and finished product quality control. CN shoe factory, based in Fossò, develops and produces footwear. Leather bags and leather accessories are produced by selected partners and commercialized by CN Production. Leather clothing production is licensed to Leather Company, which works exclusively for Costume National. Costume National has 5 flagship stores which were all designed with the same concept of classical edginess and minimalism. In October 2008 Costume National launched its online store where the Costume National and Costume National Homme collections and accessories are available.

=== C’N’C Costume National ===
C'N'C Costume National is a fashion brand that produces and distributes Ready To Wear apparel for both Men and Women, in addition to footwear and accessories. The brand operates through a licensing agreement with ITTIERRE. Furthermore, PLUS IT, the accessories division of C'N'C Costume National, offers shoes, bags, and a range of small accessories that are distributed globally. The production facilities of the brand are situated in Italy, whereas its distribution network operates worldwide.

== Collaborations and co-branding ==
In 2005, Ennio Capasa created the DUCATI Black Dogo, a motorcycle that derives its name from the Argentine mastiff. This collaboration allowed him to design a series of special items of clothing under the C’N’C Costume National Ducati label.

To celebrate its 21st anniversary in 2007, the company presented the book 21 (a photographic journal of Capasa's career), a version of the Absolut Vodka bottle dressed in black vinyl with images of two women, the Alfa 147 C’N’C 21 (a limited-edition car costume), a unisex fragrance called ‘Costume National 21’, and a line of luxury sneakers under the name ‘Costume National Active’.

During Milan Design Week of 2009, the Dutch designer Maarten Baas presented his show event entitled “Real Time” in the C’N’C Costume National showroom. C’N’C Costume National showed the SS2010 Collection in Piazza Duomo in front of 40,000 guests, rather than to a limited number of those who are active in the industry. To celebrate Christmas 2009 the company participated in the Water Project, an Amref initiative.

In 2010, C’N’C Costume National showed the FW2010/2011 Collection at the Teatro dell’Arte of the Triennale di Milano.

== Eco-projects ==
In 2009, the company's ‘Solar Bag’, which featured solar panels which charged a battery concealed in the lining that was able to supply power to mobile phones, iPods and other digital accessories, received the “Chi é Chi Award” for the best eco-friendly fashion product. In 2008 Ennio Capasa designed a limited-edition t-shirt to support the Climate Project, an Al Gore initiative. To celebrate Christmas 2008 Costume National collaborated with Planete Urgence, an organization dedicated to environmental and social change, in a ‘Plant a Tree’ project.

== See also ==
- Italian fashion
- Made in Italy
