= List of film festivals in Russia =

This is a list of film festivals in Russia.

== International film festivals ==
In Russia, criteria have been developed for classifying film festivals as international.

Since 2019 every year, the Ministry of Culture of the Russian Federation compiles a List of international film festivals held in the territory of the Russia for the following calendar years: 2019, 2020, 2021, 2022, 2023, 2024, and 2025.

Below is a list of film festivals that have been included at least once by the Ministry of Culture of the Russian Federation in the state list of international film festivals:

Name	Est.	City	Year of first inclusion in the state list of international film festivals	Organizer
Moscow International Film Festival	1935	Moscow	2019	Mediafest LLC
Kinotavr	1990	Sochi	2020	Foundation for the Support and Development of Cinema and Art "Kinotavr"
Radiant Angel Film Festival	2003	Moscow	2019	Foundation for Social and Cultural Initiatives
Moscow Jewish Film Festival	2015	Moscow	2019	Arc pictures LLC
La Boheme Cinema	2022	Moscow	2023	La Boheme Magazine

== Film festivals not included in the state list of international film festivals ==
Name	Est.	City	Organizer
World Fashion Shorts	2023	Moscow	Fashion Fund
