= Carlo Capasa =

Italian fashion executive

- Born: January 21, 1958 (age 68); Lecce, Apulia, Italy
- Occupation: Fashion executive
- Title: President of Camera Nazionale della Moda Italiana (since 2015); Cofounder, CoSTUME NATIONAL (1986-2016)

Carlo Capasa is an Italian fashion executive who has been the president of the Camera Nazionale della Moda Italiana (National Chamber of Italian Fashion) since June 2015. His leadership has been marked by controversy over his perceived lack of action against racism in the industry and protests from designers of color against his leadership.

Prior to taking over the leadership of the Chamber, Capasa co-founded CoSTUME NATIONAL, in which he supported his brother Ennio Capasa, the creative director.

== Personal life ==
Capasa was born in Lecce in Italy's Apulia region. He is the older brother of Ennio Capasa and is married to Stefania Rocca.

== CoSTUME NATIONAL ==
Capasa cofounded CoSTUME NATIONAL with his brother in 1986 and they presented their first collection at the Milan Fashion Week. He became its CEO. The brand received favorable reviews globally. He and his brother exited the brand in 2016.

== Camera della Moda ==
In 2015, Capasa was selected as president of Camera Nazionale della Moda Italiana succeeding Mario Boselli, who stepped down and took on a role as honorary president. He was most recently reelected in June 2022 for his fifth two-year term atop the chamber.

=== Racism controversy ===
Capasa's term encountered controversy starting in 2020 when a member of Camera della Nova, Stella Novarino, took the stage at a Black Lives Matter protest to decry racial discrimination in Italy including within the fashion industry. She founded an initiative to promote BIPOC designers which Capasa initially expressed support for.

He later withdrew his support for the anti-racism initiative after Novarino continued her public criticism of racial discrimination and lack of inclusion in the industry. In 2023, Novarino withdrew from Camera della Moda under Capasa's leadership and began a hunger strike due to the lack of diversity and inclusion of designers of color.
