= Orsola de Castro =

Italian Fashion Designer and Author

Orsola de Castro (born 1966 in Rome) is an Italian upcyclist, fashion designer and author. She is the co-founder of Fashion Revolution, an activism movement which works towards a sustainable fashion industry, and was creative director until 2022. De Castro has been in the sustainable fashion space for more than 20 years, since founding upcycling brand, From Somewhere, in 1997.

== Career ==
In 1997 de Castro started From Somewhere, a fashion label that addressed and repurposed pre-consumer textile waste. From Somewhere's 100% upcycled collections have sold around the world featured regularly in the international fashion press; collaborations include upcycled collections for Tesco, Speedo and Topshop.

In September 2006 Orsola, together with her partner Filippo Ricci, started Estethica, a dedicated ethical fashion showcase at London Fashion Week for the British Fashion Council. Estethica ran from 2006 to 2014 and has showcased designers such as Christopher Raeburn, Katie Jones, Bottletop, People Tree and Veja.

In 2011, Orsola and Filippo founded Reclaim To Wear, an organization that brings designers, producers and distributors to create upcycled capsule collections. Reclaim To Wear collaborations include Livia Firth and Central Saint Martins. 'Topshop's Reclaim To Wear', a collaboration running from 2012 to 2014 in which Topshop reclaimed surplus and excess stock fabric from factories in Turkey, India and the UK to make 3 capsule collections.

In 2013, together with Carry Somers, Orsola co-founded Fashion Revolution, a creative campaigning initiative aimed at raising awareness about the fashion industry's human rights and environmental issues. Fashion Revolution was founded following the Rana Plaza 2013 Dhaka garment factory collapse in Bangladesh, which happened on 24/4/2013 and took the lives of more than 1,100 garment workers. On the first anniversary of the tragedy, 62 countries took part in the first Fashion Revolution Day on 24 April 2014. Since, the campaign has seen more than 1 million people around the globe ask fashion brands "Who Made My Clothes?" on social media as a call for industry transparency.

De Castro wrote her first book, Loved Clothes Last, published by Penguin Life (Penguin Group) in 2021 (Publication date 02/11/2021). The book is a memoir of her work as an upcyclist and practical guide to clothing longevity, mending and fashion activism.

Orsola continues to mentor emerging designers, both in her personal life and via The British Fashion Council, Fashion Open Studio and as a visiting fellow at Central St. Martins. Her past mentees include Bethany Williams, Angus Tsui, Kevin Germanier, Katie Jones and Matthew Needham.

== Personal life ==
Born in Rome in 1966, Orsola is the daughter of Venetian artist, Matilde Dolcetti. As a young artist, she took part in her first group exhibitions of etchings and drawings in Rome and Venice aged 15. Orsola moved to London, UK in 1982 where she lives today.

== Publications ==
Loved Clothes Last. Penguin Life, 2021.
