= Fashion Revolution =

Not-for-profit social movement

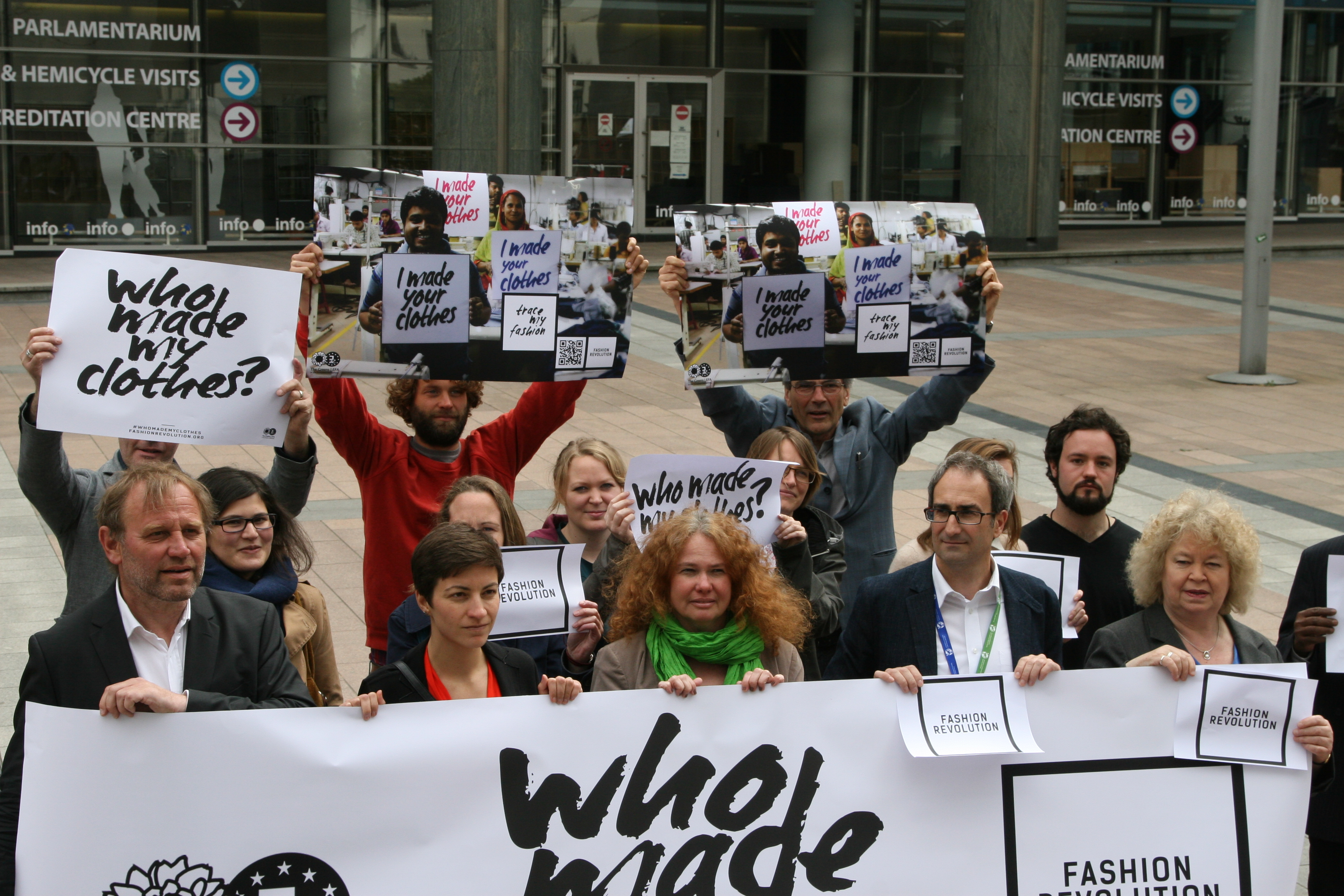
Protestors holding "Who Made My Clothes" signs

Fashion Revolution is a not-for-profit global movement represented by Fashion Revolution CIC, with teams in over 90 countries around the world. Fashion Revolution campaigns for reform of the fashion industry with a focus on the need for greater transparency in the fashion supply chain.

Starting in 2014, Fashion Revolution marks the anniversary of the Rana Plaza disaster in Bangladesh with Fashion Revolution Week and holds events each year. Between 2014 and 2020, millions of people around the world called on brands to answer the question Who Made My Clothes? The hashtag

1. WhoMadeMyClothes became the no.1 global trend on Twitter. They have faced criticisms specifically about the Global Fashion Transparency Index.

== History ==
Fashion Revolution was founded in 2013 in response to the Rana Plaza disaster in Bangladesh by Carry Somers and Orsola de Castro. The organization is funded by private foundations, institutional grants, commercial organizations, and donations from individuals. Somers and de Castro launched the

1. WhoMadeMyClothes hashtag in 2014.

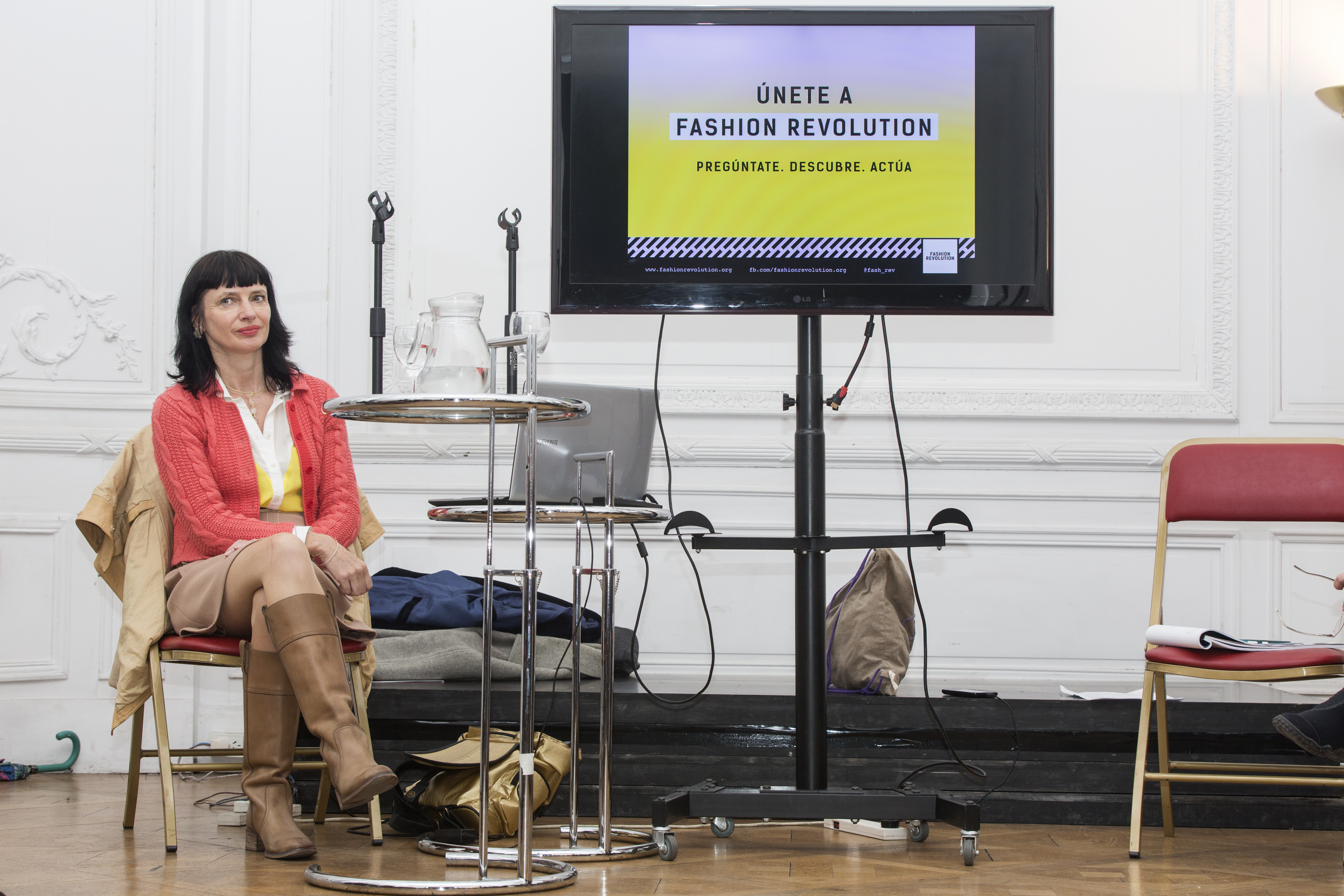
Carry Somers, founder, shares her work with Fashion Revolution.

== Fashion Revolution Week ==
The first Fashion Revolution Day took place on 24 April 2014. Fashion Revolution's hashtag #insideout was the no. 1 global trend on Twitter.

The second Fashion Revolution Day took place on 24 April 2015. The global reach from online news and broadcast media was 16.5 billion and 63 million people from across 76 countries made the hashtag

1. WhoMadeMyClothes the number one trend on Twitter The YouTube video The 2 Euro T-Shirt - A Social Experiment had over 6.5 million views and won a Cannes Lions award.

In its third year, Fashion Revolution activities took place over a week, from 18 to 24 April 2016 in over 90 countries around the world. This Fashion Revolution Week began with Fashion Question Time at the UK Houses of Parliament. and the launch of the first edition of the Fashion Transparency Index, which scored 40 large fashion companies on the information they disclose to stakeholders and the public about social and environmental issues across their supply chains. 70,000 people around the world asked brands

1. whomademyclothes with 156 million impressions of the hashtag on social media. G-Star Raw, American Apparel, Fat Face, Boden, Massimo Dutti, Zara, and Warehouse were among more than 1200 fashion brands and retailers that responded with photographs of their workers saying
2. imadeyourclothes.

In its fourth year, Fashion Revolution Week took place from 24 to 30 April 2017. On 24 April, the second edition of the Fashion Transparency Index was launched, with a review of the transparency of 100 large global fashion brands. 66,000 people attended around 1,000 Fashion Revolution events and there were 533 million impressions on social media posts using one of Fashion Revolution's hashtags during April. Over 2000 brands and producer groups responded, answering

1. imadeyourclothes.

In its fifth year, Fashion Revolution Week took place from 23 to 29 April 2018. Over 1000 Fashion Revolution events were held around the world, including Fashion Open Studio and Fashion Question Time at the Houses of Parliament. In April, the third edition of the Fashion Transparency Index was launched, ranking 150 brands on how much they disclose about their policies, practices, procedures and social and environmental impact.

Fashion Revolution Week continued in both 2019 and 2020. In 2020 Fashion Revolution launched a new hashtag #whatsinmyclothes focused on fabric composition and the chemicals used in textile production, linked to Carry Somers's participation in Exxpedition, an all-women round-the-world sailing voyage to investigate microplastic and chemical pollution in the oceans.

== Events ==
During Fashion Revolution Week, hundreds of events take place around the world. Fashion Revolution has organized high-level roundtable events on ethics, sustainability, and transparency in the fashion industry.

=== 2014 ===
- May 12: Roundtable Debate in UK House of Lords.

=== 2015 ===
- February 26: Fashion Question Time in the UK House of Commons with Mary Creagh MP, Lily Cole, Jenny Holdcroft, policy director of IndustriALL Global Union Catarina Midby, Global Head of Sustainable Communications, H&M's Dilys Williams, Head, Centre for Sustainable Fashion, and Anas Sarwar.
- June 29: Ethical Fashion 2020: a New Vision for Transparency in UK House of Lords.
- December 2: EU roundtable and White Paper called 'It's Time for a Fashion Revolution' about transparency launched in Brussels.

=== 2016 ===
- April 18: Fashion Question Time at the Houses of Parliament.

=== 2017 ===
- March 23: Fashion Revolution made their debut at Cape Town Fashion Week
- April 24: Fashion Question Time at the Houses of Parliament.
- April 24: Launch of Open Studios, a week-long series of events in London, New York, Athens, Prato, LA and Jakarta.
- April 24: Avery Dennison partnered with Fashion Revolution to create some branded patches (made with up to 90% recycled yarns)
- April 24: Collaborated with AEG/Electrolux on the Loved Clothes Last project and launched a video looking at mass production, consumerism, and the tragedy of modern-day landfills.

=== 2018 ===
- November 6: The "Who Made My Clothes" campaign film directed by MJ Delaney and produced by Futerra was awarded the Best Green Fashion Film award at the 2018 Fashion Film Festival Milano Hashtag Movements.

=== 2020 ===
- April 24: Fashion Question Time was live-streamed on YouTube to discuss trends in mass consumption.
- April 24: Fashion Revolution launched Fashion Open Studio, an international fashion showcase produced digitally to comply with COVID-19 stay at home orders.

=== 2021 ===
- Fashion Revolution co-founder Orsola de Castro published her first book "Loved Clothes Last."

=== 2022 ===
- May 24–28: A Textile Garden for Fashion Revolution at RHS Chelsea Flower Show designed by Lottie Delamain won silver gilt medal.

== Hashtag Movements ==
=== #InsideOut ===
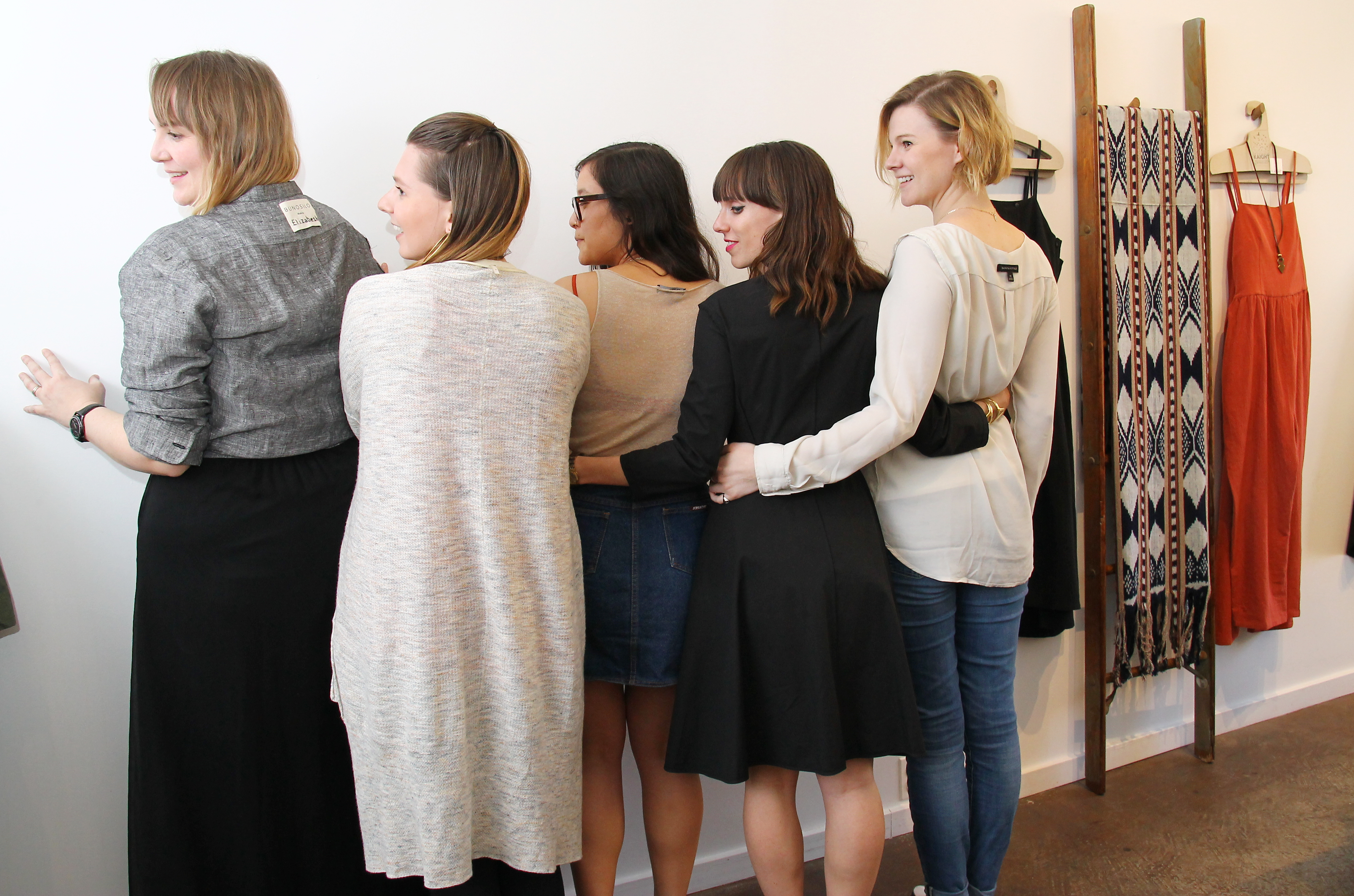
Women wear clothing inside out to support the #InsideOut movement and showcase where their clothes were produced.

For the first Fashion Revolution Day, the hashtag, #InsideOut, was created. #InsideOut became a #1 global trend on Twitter and celebrities including Christy Turlington, Livia Firth and Amber Valletta posted with the hashtag on their social media platforms. The hashtag encouraged people to wear their clothes inside out to reveal tags showing where the piece of clothing was made. Additionally, British Vogue ran a #InsideOut street style gallery on April 24, 2014.

=== #Haulternative ===
In 2015, Fashion Revolution came up with #Haulternative, a new movement to promote sustainable fashion by encouraging people to purchase used clothing over new clothing. The goal was to encourage the purchase of used clothes to mitigate the effects of the fashion manufacturing processes on the environment. There are several key aspects to the #haulternative campaign. These aspects are:

- Love story: fall back in love with the things you already own
- Broken & beautiful: share the story about an item of clothing that has become damaged or broken, but that you love and will cherish forever
- Fashion fix: make your clothes last longer by repairing them when necessary
- 2hand: recreate your favorite looks for a fraction of the price by buying from your local charity shops
- Swap: do a clothes swap with a friend
- DIY: turn your clothes to become something new by tailoring clothes to a different shape, adding new embellishments, or dying it with a different colour
- Vintage: going vintage gives you personal style and means you'll be reusing, repurposing and extending the life of beautiful clothes
- Slow: appreciate the beauty and true value of the handmade fashion items

The movement was promoted mainly through YouTube where Fashion Revolution worked with YouTube fashion vloggers to promote purchase of used clothes. The #Haulternative campaign, in conjunction with The Daily Telegraph, features fashion vloggers filming themselves doing an alternative fashion haul. Haulers who participated included CutiePieMarzia, Noodlerella, Bip Ling, Grav3yardgirl, and Shameless Maya with combined views of 2 million on YouTube. Besides the promotion through YouTube, Fashion Revolution also promoted #Haulternative by creating events with seasonal second-hand clothing pop-up stores in selected cities. In November 2019, Fashion Revolution collaborated with student ambassadors at Glasgow Clyde College to take students on guided walking tours across different second-hand clothing shopping routes.

== Fashion Revolution publications and podcasts ==
Fashion Transparency Index (2016 & 2017) ranks the biggest global fashion companies (40 in 2016, 100 in 2017) according to their level of transparency based on a questionnaire and publicly available information about supply chain issues.

Money, Fashion, Power (2017) is a zine which comprises 72 pages of poetry, illustrations, photography, graphic design and editorials exploring the hidden stories behind clothing, pricing, and the purchasing power of consumers. Collectible hard copies could be purchased and a free digital version was published online.

== Schools, colleges and universities ==
In 2014, Fashion Revolution published a quiz and an education pack for school, college and university teachers, and students.

In 2015, a new quiz and separate education worksheets were produced for primary schools (7–11 years), secondary schools (11–16 years), further education colleges (16–18 years) and universities (18+). These were published in English and translated into Spanish, Finnish and other languages by Country Coordination teams.

In July 2015, a collection of social media postings showing how teachers and students got involved in the Fashion Revolution was published on Pinterest, along with a 'who made my clothes?' film library, and a collection of 'imaginative ways in which the work of artists, activists and others can be used to inspire and engage people in the Fashion Revolution'.

In August 2016, three sessions were organized at the Annual Conference of the Royal Geographical Society (with Institute of British Geographers) conference in London with academic and activist speakers talking to the theme of "Scholar activism and the Fashion Revolution: 'who made my clothes?'" Session one focused on connecting producers and consumers, session two on slow sustainable fashion in practice and session three on engaging publics.

In June–July 2017, a free 3-week online course called 'Who Made My Clothes' was created in collaboration with the University of Exeter. Run by and featuring members of Fashion Revolution's Global Coordination Team - Ian Cook, Orsola de Castro, Sarah Ditty and Joss Whipple - the course included over 8,000 learners worldwide, and covered topics such as the pay and conditions of people working in the global garment industry.

In May 2020, a free 4-week online course called 'Fashion's Future: The Sustainable Development Goals' was created by and featuring members of Fashion Revolution's Global Coordination Team - Sarah Ditty, Ilishio Lovejoy and Sienna Somers - the course covered topics such as how the fashion industry works, how we interact with it and the impacts it has on people and planet, how the Sustainable Development Goals relate to the clothes we wear and many more interesting topics.

== Criticisms ==
In 2016, various fashion brands criticized Fashion Revolution by questioning the methods that the organization and the website Ethical Consumer used for the Fashion Transparency Index. In an article written by The Guardian, Ruth Stokes, author of The Armchair Activist's Handbook, says that meaningful change in the fashion industry can start with a Fashion Revolution Day hashtag campaign, but must go beyond it.
