= Rosenthal Tee =

- Born: 1987 or 1988 (age 37–38)
- Education: Istituto Marangoni, London College of Fashion and Central Saint Martins College of Art and Design
- Occupation: Fashion Designer
- Website: www.rosenthaltee.com

Rosenthal Tee is a Filipina clothing designer. She designs primarily bridal pieces and ready-to-wear evening gowns.

== Education ==
Tee graduated from Istituto Marangoni in 2013 with a master's degree in Fashion Design Womenswear with Distinction. She completed a pattern cutting course at the London College of Fashion, and jewellery design and textile print design courses from Central Saint Martins College of Art and Design.

== Fashion career ==
Working in Manila, Tee began creating pieces for Filipino celebrities such as Jodi Santamaria and Bianca Gonzales. In 2014, Tee was the youngest Filipino designer to be part of the Mercedes-Benz Fashion Week in Malaysia. Her first featured show took place at the 2015 Metrowear Luxe Fashion Show in Manila, where she was the opening designer.

Tee has produced collections for several New York Fashion Week featured showcases, including two shows sponsored by the Council of Aspiring American Fashion Designers, and produced by fashion producer Redeemer Resk 'Que.

She makes use of structural elements and natural femininity in her pieces. Sequins, lace and glimpses of skin are common elements of her pieces, with intricate beadwork and embroidery techniques.

Tee also currently serves as a professor at the SoFa Design Institute in Manila, Philippines.
