= La Jolla Fashion Film Festival =

- Location: La Jolla, California

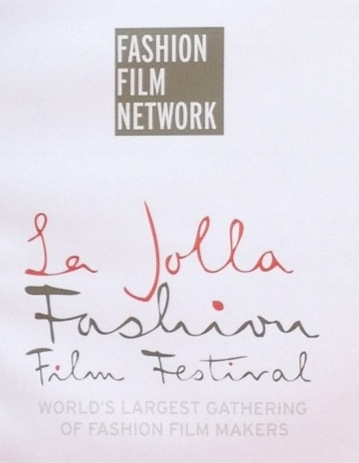
Annual La Jolla Fashion Film Festival in La Jolla, California

The La Jolla Fashion Film Festival (LJFF) is an annual three-day film festival and host of the International Fashion Film Awards held in La Jolla, California. The festival was created by Fred Sweet in 2009 and is the first international Fashion Film Festival of its kind to be founded in North America. This elite fashion industry event screens some of the top fashion films produced worldwide. The festival features panel discussions, seminars, after parties, and an award ceremony.

== See also ==
- List of fashion film festivals
