= FashionTV Russia =

Russian fashion and lifestyle television channel

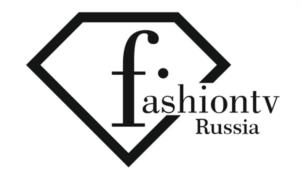
- Country: Russia
- Broadcast area: Russia
- Headquarters: Moscow

Programming
- Language: Russian
- Picture format: 16:9 (HDTV)

Ownership
- Owner: FashionTV LLC

History
- Launched: 2001

Links
- Website: fashiontv.ru

FashionTV Russia is the Russian branch of the international television channel FashionTV. It is a Russian fashion and lifestyle broadcasting channel that was founded in Moscow in 2001.

== History ==
It began broadcasting in 2001 with the assistance of Natalia Tyurina, the wife of Francois Tillier, vice president of Fashion TV. In February 2001, filming of music videos for Fashion TV's "Russian Window" began. In 2003, Igor Udalov and Natalia Tyurina left the channel. Ekaterina Vitebskaya was appointed the new general director. On January 28, 2007, Fashion TV stopped broadcasting on the NTV Plus satellite platform. In October 2007, the owner of the radio station "Megapolis FM" (Pleades group of companies), Alexander Shusterovich, acquired the perpetual rights to broadcast the channel, becoming the 100% owner of the company Fashion TV Russia. Former CEO Anton Gormakh left the TV channel on November 1, 2025, and ceased to be its co-owner.

== Background ==
=== CEO ===
CEO	Start year	End year	Ref.
Andrey Drozdov	2012	2021	
Andrey Shalakhov	2021	2022	
Anton Gormakh	2022	2025	
Oleg Fatun	2025	present	

=== Editors ===
Editor	Start year	End year	Ref.
Andrey Shalakhov	2013	2020	
Margo	2020	2022	
Inna Sigle	2022	2024	

=== Ecosystem ===
The channel's ecosystem includes the following events:

- Fashion New Year Awards - TV channel award for the year and Fashion Summer Awards where the results of the first half of the year are summed up;
- 100 Most Stylish People Awards - TV channel award in the field of style;
- Fashion Beauty Awards - TV channel award in the field of beauty and health;
- Fashion Travel Awards (Fashion Destination Awards) - TV channel award in the field of tourism;
- Reality show "Fashion Designer" - TV channel fashion design competition.
