= Carry Somers =

British author and campaigner (born 1966)

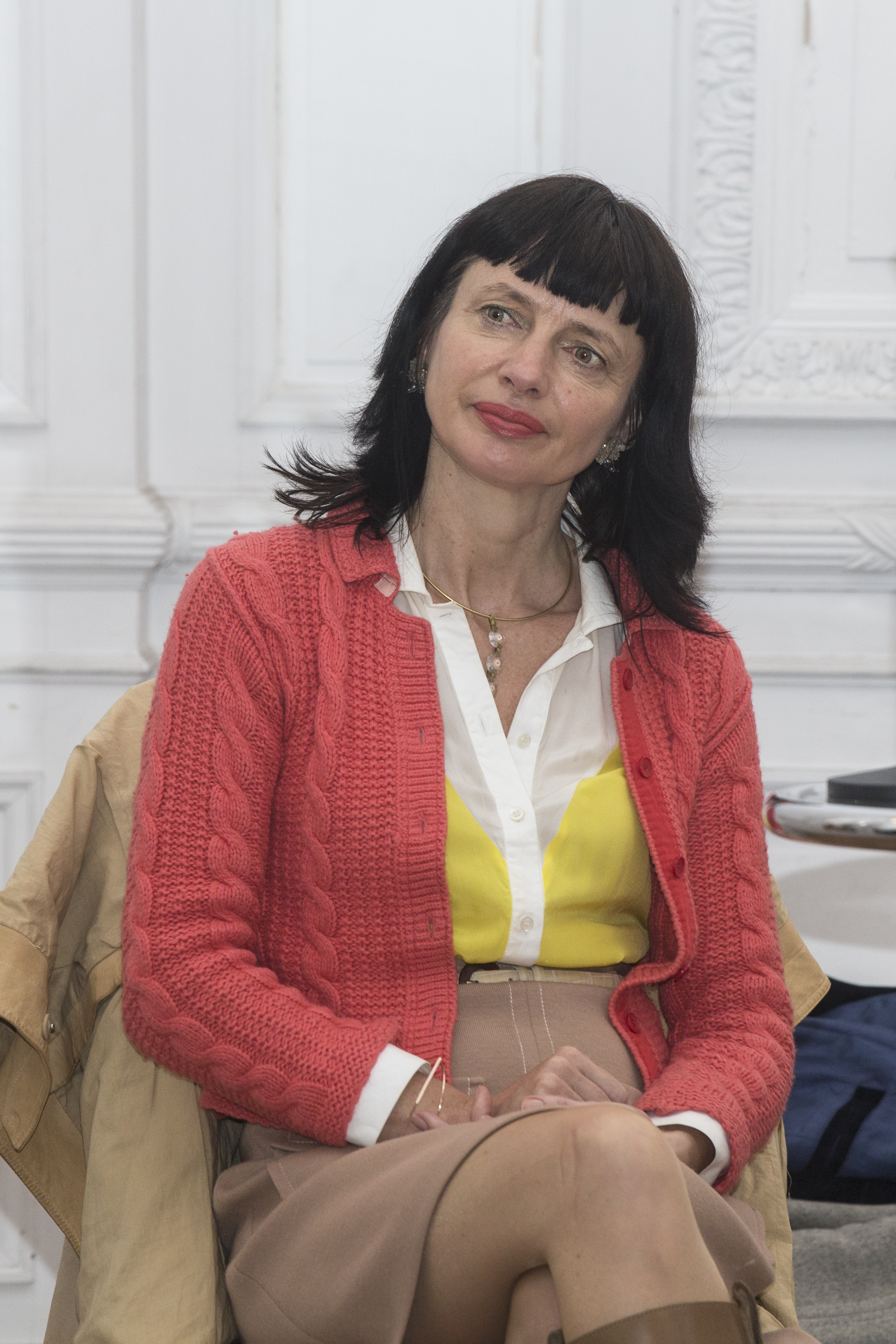
- Born: 1966 (age 59–60); Seaton, Devon, England
- Education: Colyton Grammar School, University of Essex
- Occupations: Author and campaigner
- Known for: Fashion Revolution, Pachacuti, The Nature of Fashion

Carry Somers (born 1966) is a British author and campaigner. She is co-founder of Fashion Revolution global movement and founded fair trade hat brand Pachacuti. In 2025, she published The Nature of Fashion: A Botanical Story of Our Material Lives with Chelsea Green in the UK and Rizzoli in the US. She received an honorary Doctor of Letters from Keele University in 2022 and is a Churchill Fellow.

== Background ==
Somers holds a Master's degree in Native American studies from the University of Essex and received the university's Alumnus of the Year award in 2009. Somers set up fair trade fashion brand Pachacuti in 1992 and co-founded Fashion Revolution in 2013. In 2022, Somers was awarded an honorary Doctor of Letters by Keele University.

== Career ==
=== Author and consultant ===
Somers is the author of ‘’The Nature of Fashion: A Botanical Story of Our Material Lives’’, published by Chelsea Green in 2025. The book is arranged in six parts, each made up of short narratives about the use of plant fibres and dyes in a particular place and period, and includes a glossary of plant names. In a review for Booklist, Kelly Fojtik described the book as drawing on an "encyclopedic knowledge of plants and history" and recommended it to readers interested in botany, history and thoughtful consumption.

In 2026, Somers co-authored a study published in iScience examining natural textile fibres preserved in a 150-year lake sediment record.

Somers has worked as a consultant for the International Trade Centre, a joint agency of the United Nations and World Trade Organization.

In 2023, Somers was awarded a Churchill Fellowship to research plant-based fibres and dyes. Her report, A Dictionary of Plant Fibre and Colour, was published by the Churchill Fellowship in 2024.

=== Fashion Revolution ===
Somers co-founded Fashion Revolution following the Rana Plaza disaster in Bangladesh on 24 April 2013.

Somers has convened roundtable discussions on ethics and sustainability at the UK Parliament, including the 2015 event Ethical Fashion 2020: A New Vision for Transparency and Fashion Question Time, held annually from 2015 to 2018 in Parliament and in 2019 and 2020 in partnership with the V&A Museum.

In 2020, Somers took part in eXXpedition's all-female Round the World research voyage, sailing across the South Pacific Gyre from the Galápagos Islands to Easter Island to investigate plastic and chemical pollution.

She collaborated with garden designer Lottie Delamain on the Textile Garden for Fashion Revolution, which was awarded a Silver Gilt medal at the RHS Chelsea Flower Show in May 2022.

=== Pachacuti ===
Somers founded the fair trade clothing brand Pachacuti in 1992. In 2009 it completed the pilot of the World Fair Trade Organization's Sustainable Fair Trade Management System, and The Guardian reported that it would be the first company to label all its products as certified fair trade and sustainable. According to Somers, Pachacuti was also a pilot for the European Union's Geo Fair Trade project, which traced its Panama hats by GPS to the coordinates of 154 weavers' homes and to each plot of land in the coastal cloud forest where the palm (Carludovica palmata) for weaving the hats is harvested. In September 2013, the WFTO said that Pachacuti and People Tree Ltd. were the first brands to launch products under its Fair Trade Guarantee System at London Fashion Week.

== See also ==
- Ethical consumerism
- Social entrepreneur
- Social enterprise
