= Stella Novarino =

Haitian-Italian fashion designer (born 1979)

Stella Novarino (born 17 June 1979) is an Italian fashion designer of partial Haitian origin. Her label, Stella Jean (/ˈstɛlə ˈʒɒn, -ˈʒɒ̃/), utilizes her mother's maiden name.

== Work ==
Novarino studied political science at Sapienza University of Rome, before dropping out.

Novarino dropped out of school and modeled for Egon von Fürstenberg. She decided she wanted to try designing while modeling. She is self taught. Her label uses her mother's maiden name Jean, instead of her birth surname Novarino, to reflect her Haitian heritage. She has collaborated with artisans from developing counties including Peru, Haiti, Burkina Faso, Benin, Mali, and Pakistan in producing her collections.

In 2011, Novarino won second place in a Vogue Italia emerging designers contest. In 2013, she was part of a at Armani/Teatro space showcasing emerging designers during Milan Fashion Week SS14 which included a collaboration with the International Trade Centre's Ethical Fashion Initiative to create sustainable printed fabrics. For a month in 2014, Victoria and Albert Museum in London exhibited one of her outfits while highlighting diverse designers.

Novarino designed the hand-painted uniforms of Haiti's 2026 Winter Olympics delegation, based on a 2006 depiction of a mounted Toussaint Louverture by Edouard Duval-Carrié. The uniforms went viral for their design and the small size of Haiti's two-person olympic delegation. Louverture's image was omitted from the uniform's final iteration due to Olympic regulations prohibiting political symbolism at the games, resulting in the uniforms only showing a charging horse.

== Activism ==
As of 2020, Novariono was the only Afro-European member of the Camera Nazionale della Moda Italiana. Stella Novarino took the stage at a BLM protest in June 2020 against racial discrimination in Italy and has later claimed to be the first and only Italian fashion designer to do so. In 2021, Novarino co-founded the We Are Made in Italy (WAMI) initiative with Edward Buchanan and Michelle Francine Ngonmo to showcase BIPOC designers with the support of Camera della Moda, including a Milan Fashion Week opening.

Despite WAMI's efforts, Camera della Moda eventually chose not to host a board it advocated for after Novarino publicly posted criticism of other Italian fashion brands. Carlo Capasa, president of Camera della Moda, stated that it "could not host any board that appeared to take public swipes at other members." In 2023, Novarino announced that she would withdraw from Milan Fashion Week and begin a hunger strike due to the lack of diversity and inclusion of designers of color.

== Personal life ==
Novarino was born and raised in Rome with a Haitian mother, Violette Jean, and an Italian father, Marcello Novarino. She is a mother of two, and resides in Rome with her children.
