= Ennio Capasa =

Italian fashion designer (born 1960)

- Born: 12 March 1960 (age 66); Lecce, Italy
- Known for: Alfa Romeo 147; Ducati Black Dogo
- Labels: CoSTUME NATIONAL; C'N'C

Ennio Capasa (born 12 March 1960) is an Italian fashion designer.

== Biography ==
After completing his studies at Milan's Accademia di Brera, Capasa moved to Tokyo to work with Yohji Yamamoto for two years.

Back in Italy, in 1986, he presented his first women's collection in Milan with CoSTUME NATIONAL. Since 1989 he has paraded his creations in Paris at the fashion week every year. The New York Times said that "Capasa inspired and revolutionized 90s fashion as much as Giorgio Armani did in the 80s. The Financial Times described his style as "a sobre yet refined style whose charm resides in the detail, the quality and overall aesthetic consistency" ...in which lines and looks are interpreted with precise cuts and few colours; black is not treated as a denial of colour but as its simplification.

As well as sculpture and Italy's sartorial traditions, Capasa is inspired by hard rock, funk, Italian 1960s cinema and Body Art.

A number of stars have chosen his clothes for tours or red carpet appearances including Mick Jagger, Willem Dafoe, Nicole Kidman, Cameron Diaz, Tom Cruise, Brad Pitt, Jude Law, Scarlett Johansson, Cate Blanchett, Keanu Reeves and Stefania Rocca.

Capasa is the stylist and art-director for CoSTUME NATIONAL, CoSTUME NATIONAL HOMME, and C'N'C CoSTUME NATIONAL – the line's brand for young people. He also designed the headquarters of the organization in Via Fusetti, Milan as well as his flagship stores around the world.

== Career ==
At the 1986 Milan fashion shows Capasa launched his first CoSTUME NATIONAL collection of women's ready-to-wear.

CoSTUME NATIONAL HOMME his menswear line, was first showcased in 1993 and continues to be paraded in Milan each year.

1995 was the year in which he attended personally to the interior design and launch of the first CoSTUME NATIONAL flagship stores in Milan, Tokyo, New York City and Hong Kong.

Over the years his designer label has developed in various directions.

As well as men's and women's ready-to-wear items, lingerie, perfumes and cosmetics (Costume National Scent), 2004 saw the birth of the C'N'C streetwear line for young people, produced and distributed by Itierre Spa.

== Transversal fashion projects ==
Capasa has also worked with theatre.

He designed the costumes for Frida's mirror, a play based on the life of Frida Kahlo with Ottavia Piccolo (Franco Parenti Theatre, Milan 1998); he was responsible for the set-up and staging of "Live Red: Blood, transformation and transfiguration in contemporary art" (PAC, Milan's Contemporary Art Pavilion, Milan 1999) and in 2002 he designed the costumes for "Le regole dell'attrazione" (The rules of attraction) with Valentina Cervi, Fabrizio Sacchi, Elio Germano, Lorenzo Lavia, directed by Luca Guadagnino.

In 2005 Capasa's passion for powerful motorbikes led him to design a limited series collection of accessories together with Ducati; the following year saw the launch of Black Dogo, an original, ultra-potent machine. Its look was the result of a joint project between Ducati and C'N'C CoSTUME NATIONAL.

To celebrate 21 years of CoSTUME NATIONAL, Ennio Capasa took on the staging of Michel Gondry's exhibition "L'arte del sogno" (Dream Art); he created the C'N'C CoSTUME NATIONAL dress for the Absolut vodka bottle – a sensual creation in vinyl-black and also the new Alfa Romeo 147 C'N'C CoSTUME NATIONAL – produced in limited numbers.

The anniversary also marked the opportunity to launch the new 21 CoSTUME NATIONAL perfume and organize the 21 CoSTUME NATIONAL photographic exhibition published by Assouline on 21 years of the company and the most significant stages in the development of his design.

The associated book features details of the working relationships, friendships, photographs and celebrities who espouse the CoSTUME NATIONAL philosophy including Willem Dafoe, Milla Jovovich, Mick Jagger, Hilary Swank, Keith Richards, Lenny Kravitz, Cameron Diaz, Shakira, Madonna.
