= Oskar Metsavaht =

Brazilian fashion designer

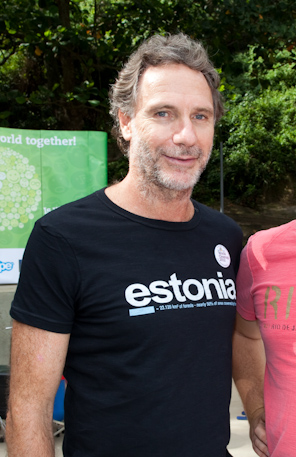
- Born: Oskar Metsavaht; 1961; Caxias do Sul, Rio Grande do Sul, Brazil
- Education: University of Rio de Janeiro
- Occupations: Fashion designer, UNESCO Goodwill Ambassador, environmentalist, honorary consul
- Label: Osklen

Oskar Metsavaht (Caxias do Sul, Brazil, 1961) is a Brazilian artist, academic degree in medicine, fashion designer and environmental activist. Oskar's work expresses the theme of preserving the forest, water and the empowerment and protection of the peoples of the forest, as an artist, designer and activist. He is founder and creative director of Osklen, a Brazilian fashion brand, recognized as one of the forerunners of the New Luxury concept that strives for the fusion between ethics and aesthetics and advocates conscious fashion through the adoption of sustainable practices. Creative Director of OM.art studio, where he hosts his art studio, an exhibition space and the studio for the development and production of art projects. Metsavaht serves as UNESCO Goodwill Ambassador. Creator of Janeiro Hotel, located in Leblon, Rio de Janeiro. He is also on the advisory board of the Inhotim Institute and board member of Museum of Modern Art (MAM) of Rio de Janeiro. In 2014, Oskar Metsavaht was awarded as Knight of Ordem do Mérito Cultural (Order of Cultural Merit) medal from the Ministry of Culture (Brazil) an honorary order granted by the Federal Government to personalities and institutions that make relevant contributions to Brazil's culture.

== Background ==
Oskar Metsavaht was born and grew up in Caxias do Sul, a city in Rio Grande do Sul state in Southern Brazil. His paternal grandparents came from Estonia to Brazil ("Metsavaht" means "forest guardian" in the Estonian language). His father was a doctor. His mother was a teacher of philosophy and was involved in various humanitarian projects in the Southern Brazil. He graduated from the University of Rio de Janeiro with a degree in medicine (trained as orthopedic surgeon) and later worked as a physician in poor communities.

== Career ==
=== Osklen ===
Early in his career, Oskar Metshavaht became a self-trained fashion designer and in 1989, he founded Osklen, a fashion brand for men and women wear. The company started with production of winter sportswear. In 1998, Osklen incorporated principles of sustainability – ASAP ("as sustainable as possible, as soon as possible") that in 2018 was adopted as official company's motto) and sought to use more sustainable fabrics (also applying socio-environmental criteria) such as Pirarucu fish leather, Amazonian jute, silk straw fibers, latex, and organic cotton for some of its clothes. According to the WhiteWall Magazine, in 2018, "Osklen had 47 percent sustainable pieces in its collection from 38 suppliers that the company had developed for the last 20 years". In 2012, Alpargatas acquired a significant stake of "Osklen" with the intention to expand the brand internationally. As of May, 2019, "Osklen" operated in more than 80 stores across Brasil and also had stores in USA, Uruguay and Greece.

=== Arts ===
In 2011, Oskar held his first solo exhibition, entitled Ipanema, during the Miami Basel Art Fair. In 2013, the exhibition was also shown at BA Photo Art, Recoleta Cultural Center, Buenos Aires and at the Quintenz Gallery in Aspen. In 2015, Oskar and his crew filmed a documentary about Ashaninka tribe living in the remote village of Apiwtxa. In 2016 he showed the exhibition Christ the Redeemer at the City Historical Museum in Rio de Janeiro. In 2017, Ipanema by Oskar Metsavaht exhibition opened at Casa de Cultura Laura Alvim, Ipanema, Rio de Janeiro and 'Soundtrack by Oskar Metsavaht' was shown at the Museum of Image and Sound in São Paulo. For the latter, Oskar took an acting role and brought to life the final project developed by Cris, an artist portrayed by Selton Mello in a movie alongside Ralph Ineson and Seu Jorge. The film also served as the starting point for Osklen's Fall/Winter 17 collection. The film, the collection and the exhibition were all developed simultaneously, in a collaboration with several artists. Osklen Spring/Summer 18 collection was inspired by Tarsila do Amaral. The idea came from an invitation made by Tarsila's family, who made the works and historical details of the notable Brazilian female artist available for Oskar and his design team. In December 2017, Oskar opened OM.art, an experimental space that houses content for contemporary reflections on art, science, politics, economy and philosophy.

== Environmentalism ==
In 2000, after encountering issues finding sustainable fabrics for his company, Metshavaht launched E-brigade, a movement intended to raise awareness and disseminate environmental information in Brazilian society. The movement later developed and lead to the creation of Instituto-E in 2006, an NGO which focuses on the preservation of biodiversity as well as the historical and cultural heritage of Brazil, through the development of various socio-environmental projects. A number of sources report that the organization "identifies alternative (not prior used in manufacturing) materials found in different regions of Brazil to develop for people's use. According to UNESCO's official page, in May, 2011, Metshavaht was appointed UNESCO's GoodWill Ambassador in Brazil, "in recognition of his work to support UNESCO’s actions in favor of a culture of peace, social inclusion and sustainable development, focusing on youth as a priority". Metshavaht is also a frequent speaker on conferences and events related to biodiversity and environmental issues. Representing Brazil and the South Atlantic countries, Oskar participated in the discussion on creating the South Atlantic Whale Sanctuary (SAWS) in a region that connects Brazil, Argentina, Gabon, Uruguay and South Africa. He is a recipient of several awards for his environmental contributions including “Faz a diferença” (2003), “Future Creator” (2007), "Paris Sustainability Fair award" (2012) and "Green Carpet Challenge Award" (2019).

== Personal life ==
Oskar Metsavaht lives and works between Rio de Janeiro and New York. He has a wife, Nazaré Metsavaht, and three children: Thomas, Felipe and Caetana.

== Documentary ==
- 2015. Asháninka expedition (July, 2015)

== Art projects ==
- 1995 – 2006 | Director - 'Surfing the Mountains' Trilogy
- 2001 | Project with Andy Warhol Foundation of Art
- 2007 | Creative Director - Sfera Arpoador watches for H.Stern
- 2012 | “The Creators Project” with Chris Milk and Takeshi Murata
- 2014 | Creative Immersion at Inhotim
- 2015 | Creative Immersion at the Ashaninka Indigenous Tribe, Acre, Brazil

== Solo exhibitions ==
- 2011 | ‘Ipanema’ | Miami Art Basel | Miami, EUA
- 2013 | ‘Ipanema’ | BA Photoart − Centro Cultural Recoleta | Buenos Aires, Argentina
- 2013 | ‘Ipanema’ | Quintenz Gallery | Aspen, EUA
- 2014 | ‘In California’ | Galeria Logo | São Paulo, Brasil
- 2016 | ‘Cristo Redentor − Divina Geometria’ | Museu Histórico da Cidade | Rio de Janeiro, Brasil
- 2017 | ‘Soundtrack’ | Museu da Imagem e do Som (MIS)| São Paulo, Brasil
- 2017 | ‘Ipanema’ | Casa de Cultura Laura Alvim | Rio de Janeiro, Brasil
- 2019 | ‘Cristo Redentor − Divina Geometria’ | Museu de Arte Sacra | São Paulo, Brasil

== Group exhibitions ==
- 2014 | Made by... Feito por Brasileiros | ‘Interfaces I − Man // Art // Nature’ | Cidade Matarazzo − São Paulo, Brasil
- 2015 | Arte.BA | ‘Elements of Style’ | Buenos Aires, Argentina
- 2015 | Ocupação Mauá | ‘Interfaces II − Man // Cosmos // Forest’ | ArtRio − Rio de Janeiro, Brasil
- 2015 | Arte Clube Jacarandá | ‘Parangoleando’ | Miami Art Basel, Shore Club − Miami Beach, EUA
- 2016 | Arte Clube Jacarandá | ‘Viewfinder’ | Vila Aymoré − Rio de Janeiro, Brasil
- 2016 | Este Arte | ‘Interfaces II − Man // Cosmos // Forest’ | Xippas Galleries − Punta del Este, Uruguai
- 2016 | Fiac | ‘Interfaces II − Man // Cosmos // Forest’ | Artcurial − Paris, França
- 2016 | Casa Itália (Comitê Olímpico Italiano − Coni) | ‘Divina Geometria’ | Costa Brava − Rio de Janeiro, Brasil
- 2017 | Art Rio | ‘Container’ | Marina da Glória − Rio de Janeiro, Brasil
- 2017 | Monumental − Arte em Movimento | ‘Parangoleando’ | Marina da Glória − Rio de Janeiro, Brasil
- 2018 | The Wrong − New Digital Art Bienalle | ‘Psychedelia Synthesis’ | Cidade das Artes − Rio de Janeiro, Brasil
- 2018 | Dialética | ‘Photo Synthesis’ | studio OM.art − Rio de Janeiro, Brasil
- 2018 | Labor | ‘Negro’ | studio OM.art − Rio de Janeiro, Brasil
- 2018 | Conjunctions | ‘Interfaces II − Man // Cosmos // Forest’ | Azulik Uh May / IK Lab − Tulum, México
- 2019 | Rios do Rio | ‘Photo Synthesis’ | Museu Histórico Nacional − Rio de Janeiro, Brasil
- 2019 | O Sagrado na Arte Moderna Brasileira | ‘Apocalypsis’ e ‘Contemplatio’ | Museu de Arte Sacra − São Paulo, Brasil
- 2019 | Árvore! A Tragédia da Paisagem | ‘Manifesto Amazônico I – Garimpo’ | Praça Adolpho Bloch − São Paulo, Brasil

== Collections ==
- 2016. Asháninka
- 2016. Museu de Arte do Rio | ‘Ascending’| Videoart
- 2016. Museu Histórico da Cidade do Rio de Janeiro | Apocalypsis| Mixed media on wood 100x100cm
- 2013. Endless Summer/Into the Mountain
- 2011. Royal Black artwork (Afro-Brazilian museum)
