= Fashion in Film Festival =

Film festival

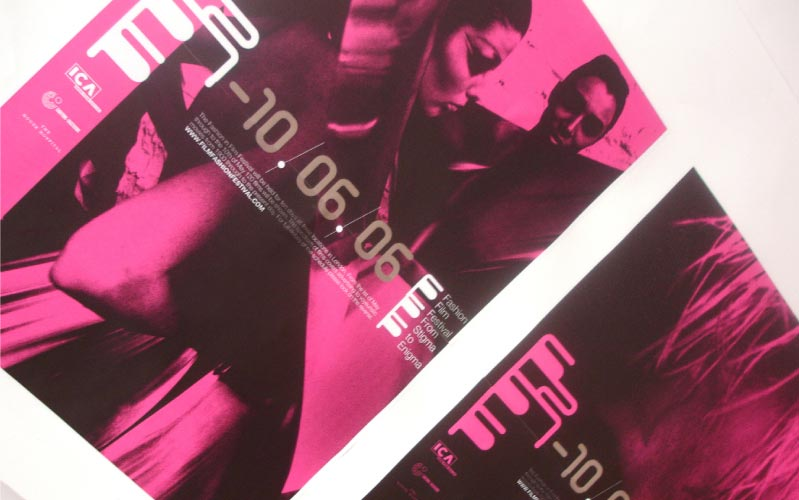
Poster for Fashion in Film Festival by Sean O'Mara

The Fashion in Film Festival (often abbreviated as FFF) is a biennial festival organised by Fashion in Film. The festival is currently in its eighth edition. It has previously been held at venues including BFI Southbank, Tate Modern, the Barbican Centre, the Horse Hospital and the Ciné Lumière in London and the Museum of the Moving Image in New York.

== History ==
The first Fashion in Film Festival was titled Between Stigma and Enigma and premiered in London in May 2006 at the Ciné lumière, the Horse Hospital and the Institute of Contemporary Arts. The programme subsequently toured to Kino Světozor in Prague and the Museum of the Moving Image in New York. The poster for the festival's visit to Prague was designed by Petr Babak; its bold colours and black hats suggest early films and later developments.

The second Fashion in Film Festival was titled If Looks Could Kill and was held in London in May 2008 at BFI Southbank, Tate Modern, the Ciné lumière, the Institute of Contemporary Arts and the Horse Hospital.

The third Fashion in Film Festival, Birds of Paradise was held in London in December 2010 at BFI Southbank, Tate Modern, the Barbican Centre, and the Horse Hospital, touring to the Museum of the Moving Image in New York in April 2011.

== Parent organisation Fashion in Film ==
Fashion in Film is based at Central Saint Martins College of Art and Design in London. It was founded by Marketa Uhlirova, Roger Burton and Christel Tsilibaris in 2005 as a way of encouraging critical response to the use of fashion, clothing, jewellery, make-up and accessories in film, and addressing current practices in the context of film's long history.

Fashion in Film commissions new public projects, bringing together artists, designers, photographers, filmmakers, performers and musicians. Fashion in Film present a mix of popular culture, art and the underground which shows how the moving image has represented and interpreted fashion as a concept, an industry and a cultural form. As well as curating the festival, Fashion in Film collaborates on smaller projects including special screenings, conferences and exhibitions.

== Fashion in Film festivals ==
- May – June 2025: Grounded: Fashion’s Entanglements with Nature in London.
- March 2019: Layering: Fashion, Art, Cinema in Miami. Presented in association with Miami Film Festival and Miami Design District.
- April 2018: Wearing Time: Past, Present, Future, Dream in New York at the Museum of the Moving Image.
- March 2017: Wearing Time: Past, Present, Future, Dream in London.
- January 2016: Wearing Time: Returns, Recalls, Renewals in Miami. Co-curated with Tom Gunning.
- March 2015: Frame by Frame in London.
- May 2013: Marcel L’Herbier: Fabricating Dreams in London.
- April - May 2011: Birds of Paradise tour to Museum of the Moving Image.
- December 2010: Birds of Paradise in London.
- November 2008: If Looks Could Kill tour to the Arnolfini in Bristol.
- May 2008: If Looks Could Kill in London.
- March 2007: Between Stigma and Enigma tour to the Museum of the Moving Image, New York.
- September 2006: Between Stigma and Enigma tour to Kino Svetozor, Prague.
- May 2006: Between Stigma and Enigma.

== Other projects ==
- November 2011: conference: Secrets of the Orient at Yale University.
- October 2011: film programme at Holon Fashion Week at Design Museum, Holon.
- June 2011: Fashion-Colour-Cinema-Inventory' for Arnhem Mode Biennale.
- May 2011: collaboration with Fokus Video Festival in Copenhagen.
- November - December 2010: installed Kinoscope Parlour, based on Edison's kinetoscope at 12 locations in London showing archive film. Locations included Somerset House, the V&A, Queens Road Market in Upton Park and Lewisham Library.
- September 2009: presented a programme of films at an international symposium at Museum Boijmans Van Beuningen in Rotterdam.
- October 2008 - March 2009: screenings at the V&A with Cold War Modern exhibition.
- October 2007: presented a two-day event focusing on sweatshops at the Horse Hospital.
- June 2007: collaborated with Arnhem Mode Biënnale
- November 2006: The Death of Taste: unpicking the fashion cycle film programme at Institute of Contemporary Arts.

== See also ==
- List of fashion film festivals
