= Russian fashion =

Fashion in Russia and the Soviet Union

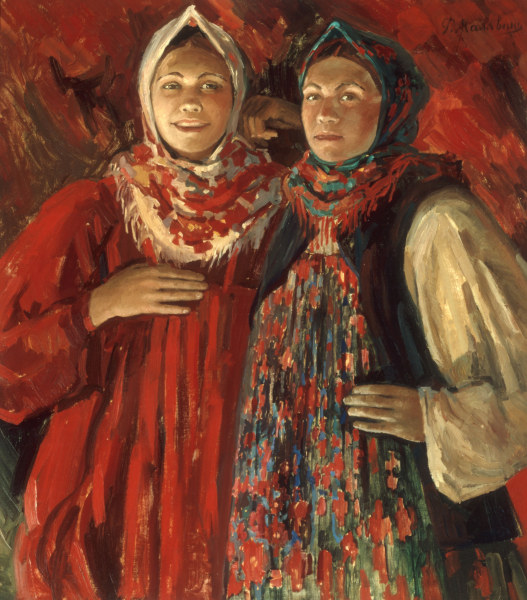
”Two Russian Beauties” by Filipp Malyavin (c.1905)

Russian fashion is diverse and reflects contemporary fashion norms as well as the historical evolution of clothing across the Russian Federation. Russian fashion is thought to be influenced by the state's former socialist ideology, the various cultures within Russia, and the cultures of surrounding regions.

== History of Soviet fashion ==
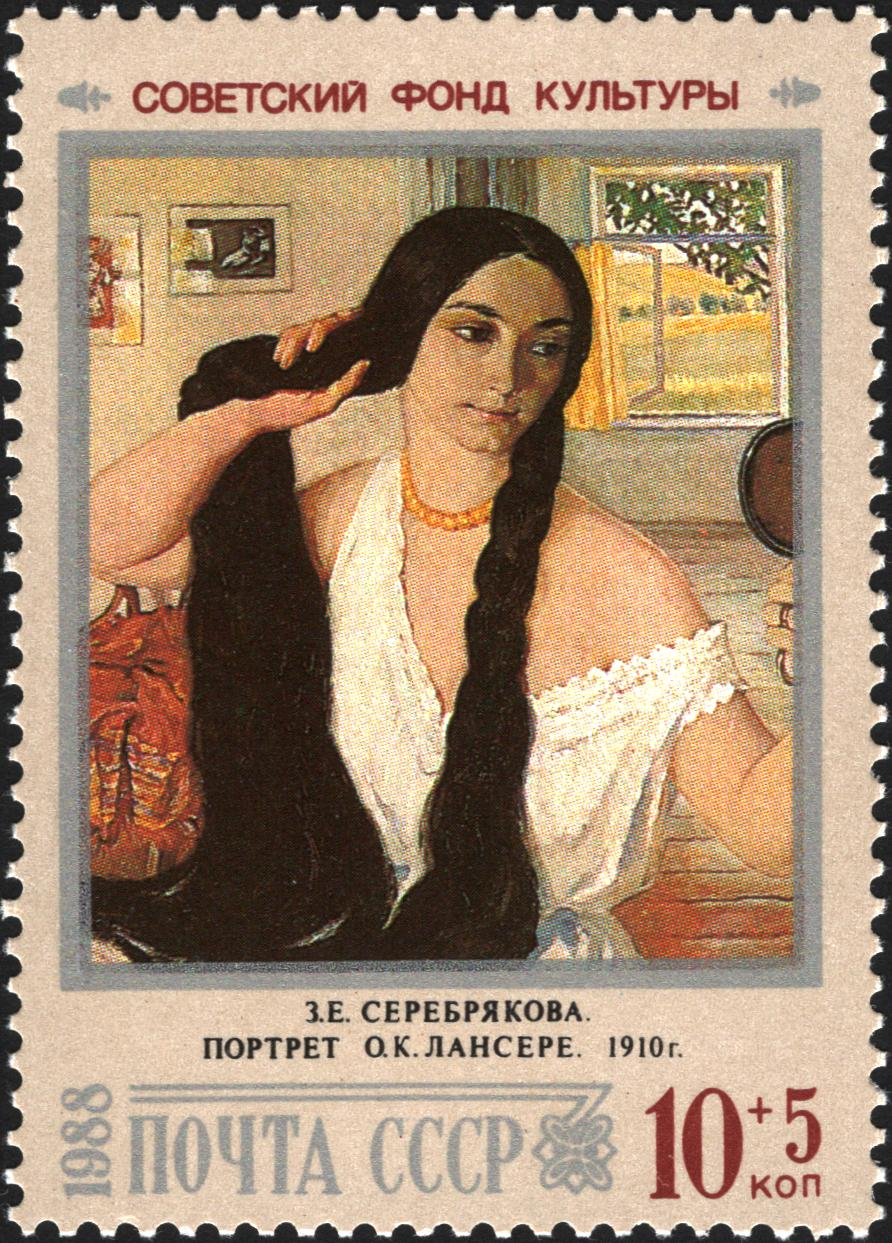
An USSR stamp, Painting. Date of issue: 22 August 1988. Designer: A. Zharov., Michel 5861, Scott B137 10+5 K. multicoloured. "Portrait of O.K. Lansere" (Z.E. Serebryakova, 1910)

=== Lenin era (1917–1920s) ===
The New Economic Policy's authorization of private business allowed Western fashion to enter the Soviet Union. However, Bolshevik ideology opposed Western fashion consumption as an intrinsically capitalist practice. Western fashion emphasized both economic status and gender differences in a system that sought to deemphasize both.

In the early 1920s, Party-sanctioned magazines like Rabotnitsa ("The Working Woman") and Krest’yanka ("The Peasant Woman") offered discourse on fashion. Covers displayed women in plain work clothes, yet the magazines often contained advertisements for private companies selling stylish attire. By 1927, however, the magazines’ message was consistent: women should be judged on their capability for work, not their appearance. Fashion, as a beauty aid, was therefore considered bourgeois and detrimental to socialist society.

In its place, the state commissioned projects to engineer a new Soviet type of dress, which drew on traditional clothing, constructivist forms, and technological facilities. Constructivists like Varvara Stepanova and Alexander Rodchenko agreed that fashion driven by the market was inherently harmful. They employed the simple geometry of cubism to design clothing that was functional, easily mass-produced, and sometimes unisex. Due to a lack of adequate material and machinery, however, this prozodezhda, or "production clothing", did not appeal to the proletariat audience for which it was intended. Designs were only available to the most privileged members of the intelligentsia, who ultimately preferred Western fashion to the highly experimental prozodezhda.

=== Stalin era (1930s–1950s) ===
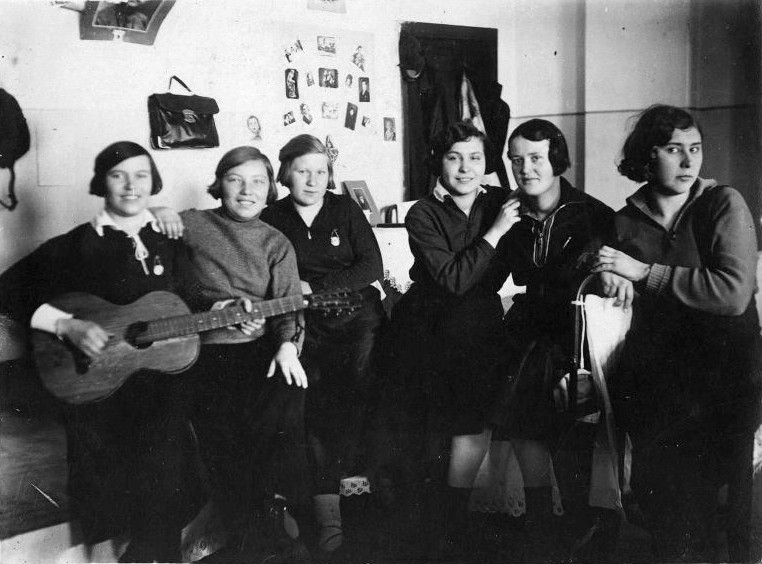
A group of women wearing skirts and collars in Vladimir, mid-1930s

During the Stalin era, anti-fashion sentiments dissipated. Party-sanctioned magazines now promoted fashion and beauty as necessary parts of a Soviet woman's life. Rabotnitsa included fashion advice in almost every issue and regularly reported on new fashion houses opening across the Soviet Union. Krest’yanka even organized traveling shows to bring fashion to the countryside. The promoted aesthetics were highly varied, ranging from urban polish to ornate decoration.

This new interest in fashion was connected to Joseph Stalin’s assertion that "life has become better and more cheerful". Persistent images of plain women and quaint peasants were thought to propagate the capitalist view that socialism engenders poverty. Fashionable and beautiful clothes were a signal of culture and quality of life equal (or superior) to that under capitalism. Stakhanovites, as foremost examples of successful workers, were expected to adhere to particularly high standards of appearance. They were often photographed wearing fine clothing even as they went to the factory.

In reality, the touted fashions were beyond most citizens’ means. Soviet industry was unable to produce fashionable clothing in significant quantity, and what did exist was not available for general sale. During World War II, the Soviet fashion industry went on hiatus. If the average Soviet citizen desired a particularly stylish item of clothing, they were usually forced to commission a private tailor. Day-to-day fashion was often self-produced, and magazines consistently advised women to take a do-it-yourself (DIY) approach to their appearance.

=== Khrushchev era (1950s–1960s) ===
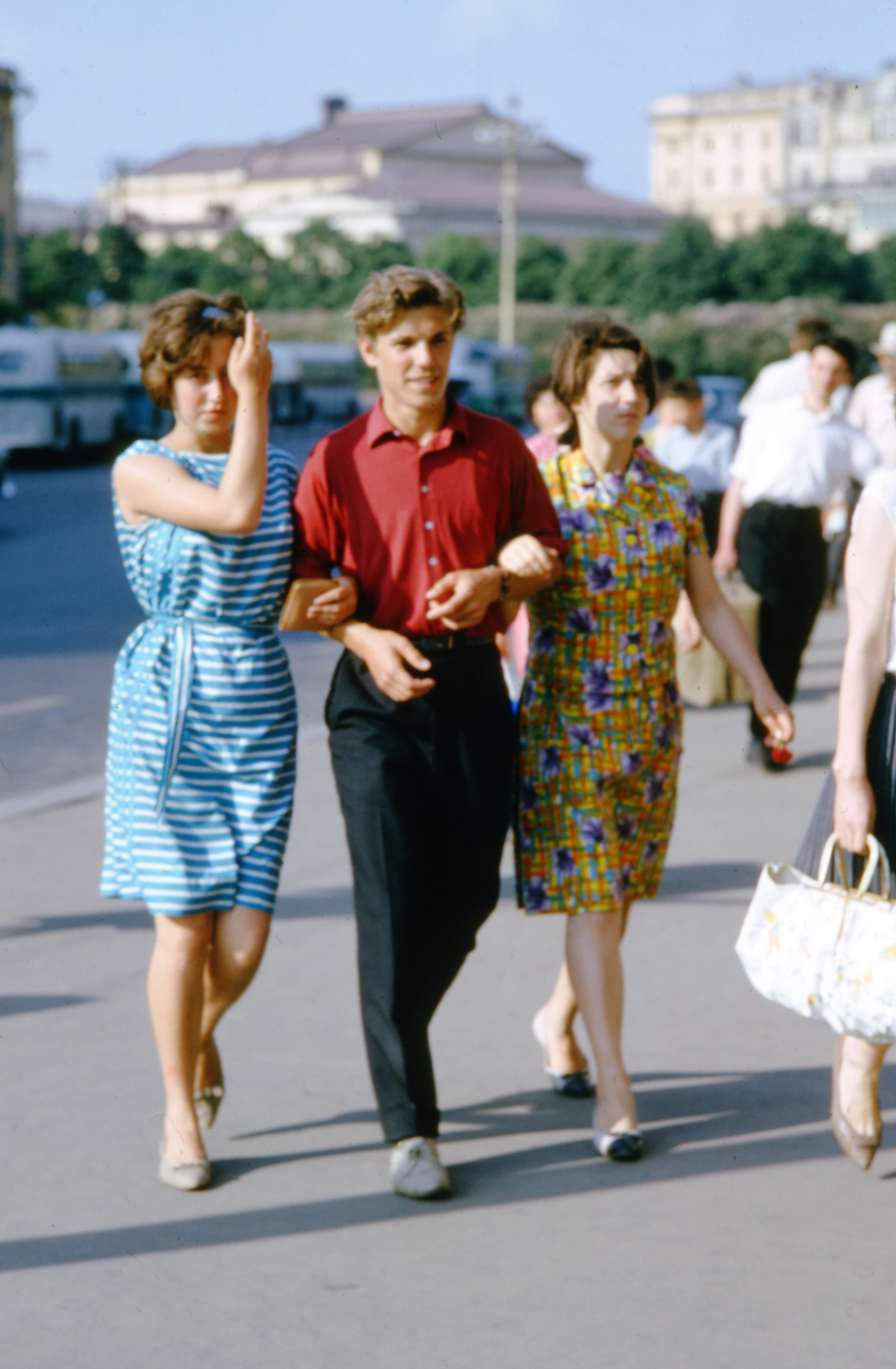
A trio of friends wearing bright fashionable attire in Moscow, 1964

The Khrushchev Thaw brought a greater representation of Western fashion to domestic media. Journalists were sent abroad to report on the latest international fashion trends. However, state-owned fashion institutions and magazines moderated these trends for Soviet audiences. Fashion "crazes" were rejected in favor of classic, long-running styles. In addition, moderation and modesty were stressed. Coco Chanel’s signature style, for example, was particularly admired as a symbol of timelessness and simple sophistication. An article in the New York Times from 1959 slammed Soviet fashions as unremarkable, "clumsy copies" of outdated Western forms. Availability of these styles, however, was on the rise. Shops like the newly reopened GUM department store now carried the new fashions, albeit at high prices.

Where previous generations reminisced about the Great Patriotic War and Joseph Stalin's red terror, the 1950s and 1960s, gave rise to the "Sputnik generation" and the stilyagi (Russian: стиляги) who championed a new, youthful wave in popular culture. In the mid-1950s, the Soviet government enacted an anti-stilyagi campaign through "public censure, humiliation and shame" for being influenced by and promoting excessively Western fashion norms.

In previous generations, fashion had not been a focal point for Soviet ideologists and was often viewed as an "anomaly in socialism" by these circles. However, at the turn of the Second World War, during the Khrushchev Thaw, authorities became aware of fashion as a ‘natural force’ in society; particularly as more women became interested in dressing well. Therefore, fashion became an avenue through which the Soviet government would, primarily, seek to rebuild a war-torn nation and revitalise the efforts of promoting pro-Party sentiment. The symbol of the post-War "New Soviet People" would thus emerge, wherein trendy youths would help construct the modernist image of a new communist utopia and subsequently help fight counterculture movements like the stilyagi from the pop-cultural front.

The institution of fashion in the Khrushchev era was characterised by a system of state-financed Parallel Organisations. There are indications that Khrushchev, while still opposing the excessive nature of art and architecture in Western culture, was lenient in his judgement towards fashion and the clothing industry. In 1964, Khrushchev oversaw the Fourth Session of the Supreme Council of the USSR that promoted measures towards The Communist Party Program in the field of Raising the People’s Prosperity. He declared:

Working people want to acquire clothes and shoes that have an up-to-date style and beautiful color and that correspond to the season and to fashion. This is a good thing.

But the Third Party Program to which he referred (adopted at the Twenty-Second Party Congress in 1961), and which promised the arrival of full communism in the 1980s, made no mention of the notion of fashion. As for clothing consumption, it was only meant to satisfy the "rational needs of reasonable people".

From the early 1960s to the late 1980s, the USSR would develop the largest system of fashion design and marketing in the socialist world; with 30 regional fashion houses employing over 2802 designers.

The state's new approach towards fashion was carefully calculated. The promotion of exorbitant fashion that occurred in the Stalin era, and the contrast to actual availability, had led to public resentment. In the Khrushchev era, the state-owned clothing industry was still unable to produce mass amounts of fashionable clothing. However, simplified fashions, rejection of excess, and high prices gave the industry a measure of control over consumer demand. By the early 1960s, the middle class' standards of appearance had risen such that Moscow street fashion was nearly indistinguishable from that in a Western city.

At the same time, counterculture fashion movements grew among elite youths. The stilyagi, or "style hunters", originally based their look on media portrayals of Western (especially American) fashions. Men wore items such as Hawaiian shirts, sunglasses, narrow slacks, and pointed shoes, while female stilyagi wore miniskirts and maintained a childlike demeanor. These styles were labeled as "excessive", and Komsomol groups would sometimes raid stilyagi hideouts and cut off their hair and pant legs.

To some historians, the Khrushchev era, thus, represented an ideological shift largely promoted by international contacts through commodity exchange; signifying the new current of Western values, at least, in relations to cultural expression. However, these views are controversial with some scholars taking aim at the growth of collective surveillance from the Soviet government and the emergence of ‘volunteer policing’ that increased the "prevalence of social control at the daily level under Khrushchev".

=== Brezhnev era (1970s–1980s) ===
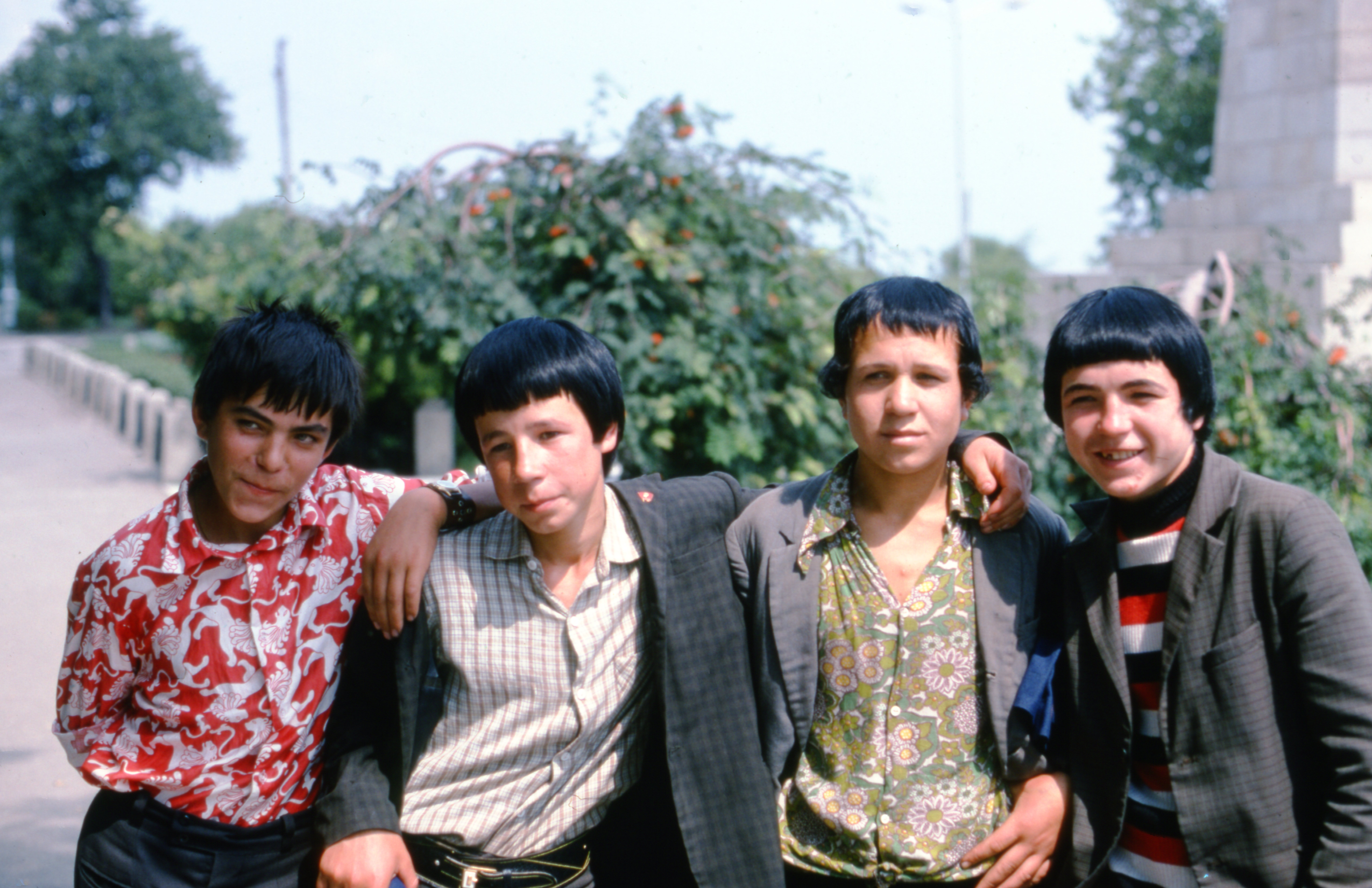
A group of boys wearing shirts and jackets pose together, Volga region, 1975

By the end of the 1960s, Soviet fashion institutions, like the centralized fashion bureau ODMO (All-Union House of Prototypes), were embracing increasingly novel Western trends. At the same time, there was still a need to establish distinctively Soviet fashions. "Space fashion," for example, fit directly into state ideology by glorifying a triumph of Soviet science.

Reality, however, differed from ODMO's designs. Soviet industry could not keep up with the demand for fashionable goods, and supply in USSR shops was worse than in other socialist countries. The public was also dissatisfied with the available items. For example, Soviet women so disliked promoted designs involving Russian ethnic prints that the style ultimately became more popular in the West than in the Soviet Union itself.

The middle class increasingly idealized Western fashion, as it was visible but not easily obtainable. American-made blue jeans were an especially desirable item. Secondhand stores were one source of Western fashion, as visitors from the West could import goods and sell them for high profits. The retail chain Beriozka also sold some Western clothing, but only to the privileged few who could pay in hard currency or foreign exchange certificates. Foreign exchange certificates and Western clothing were also available on the black market.

=== Gorbachev era (1980s) ===
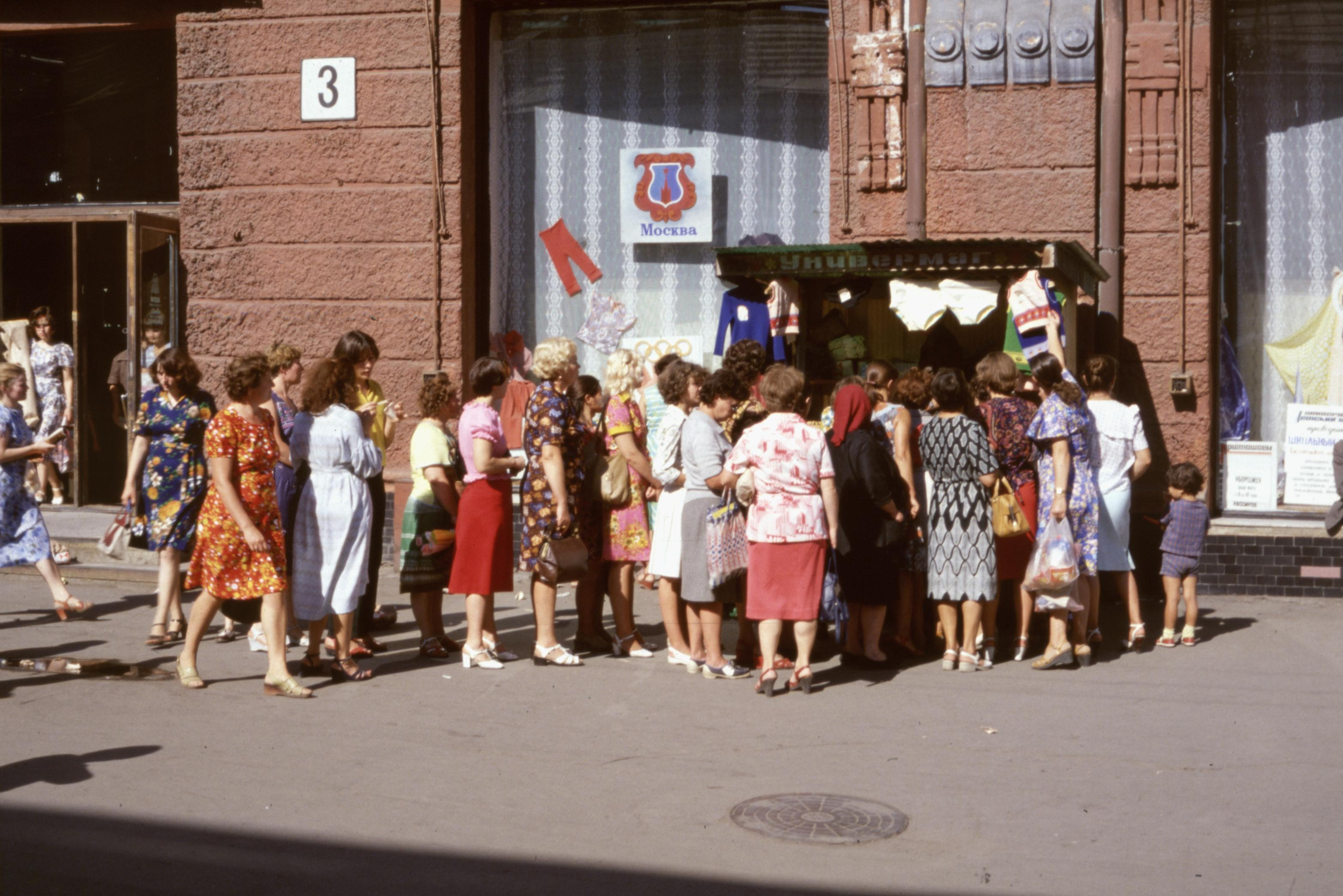
Women queue at a clothes stall in Irkutsk, 1981

Under perestroika, varied fashion became acceptable. In 1987, Gorbachev allowed a Russian edition of Burda Fashion magazine to be produced and distributed. The next year, Zhurnal mod began a new run as the first "proper" fashion magazine in the Soviet Union. In content, it was virtually indistinguishable from a Western fashion magazine, although ODMO provided all the styles.

When the nineteenth party conference met in the summer of 1989, they passed a resolution to increase the production of consumer goods. Fashionable clothes were mentioned specifically in the proceedings. Despite advocates for fashion at the highest level of bureaucracy, real changes in production failed to take place. The Ministry of Light Industries set quotas for the creation of new products, but textile factories recycled older patterns and products instead.

Meanwhile, relaxation of censorship under glasnost made the middle class even more aware of their Western counterparts. They felt that they deserved fashionable clothing as a status symbol, but still could not easily obtain it.

One of the brightest representatives of this era is a Russian designer Vyacheslav (Slava) Zaitsev.

In this era, Russian media in the field of fashion and culture were born, for example, the Magazine Krestyanka and others.

== Post-Soviet era (1990s-2010s) ==
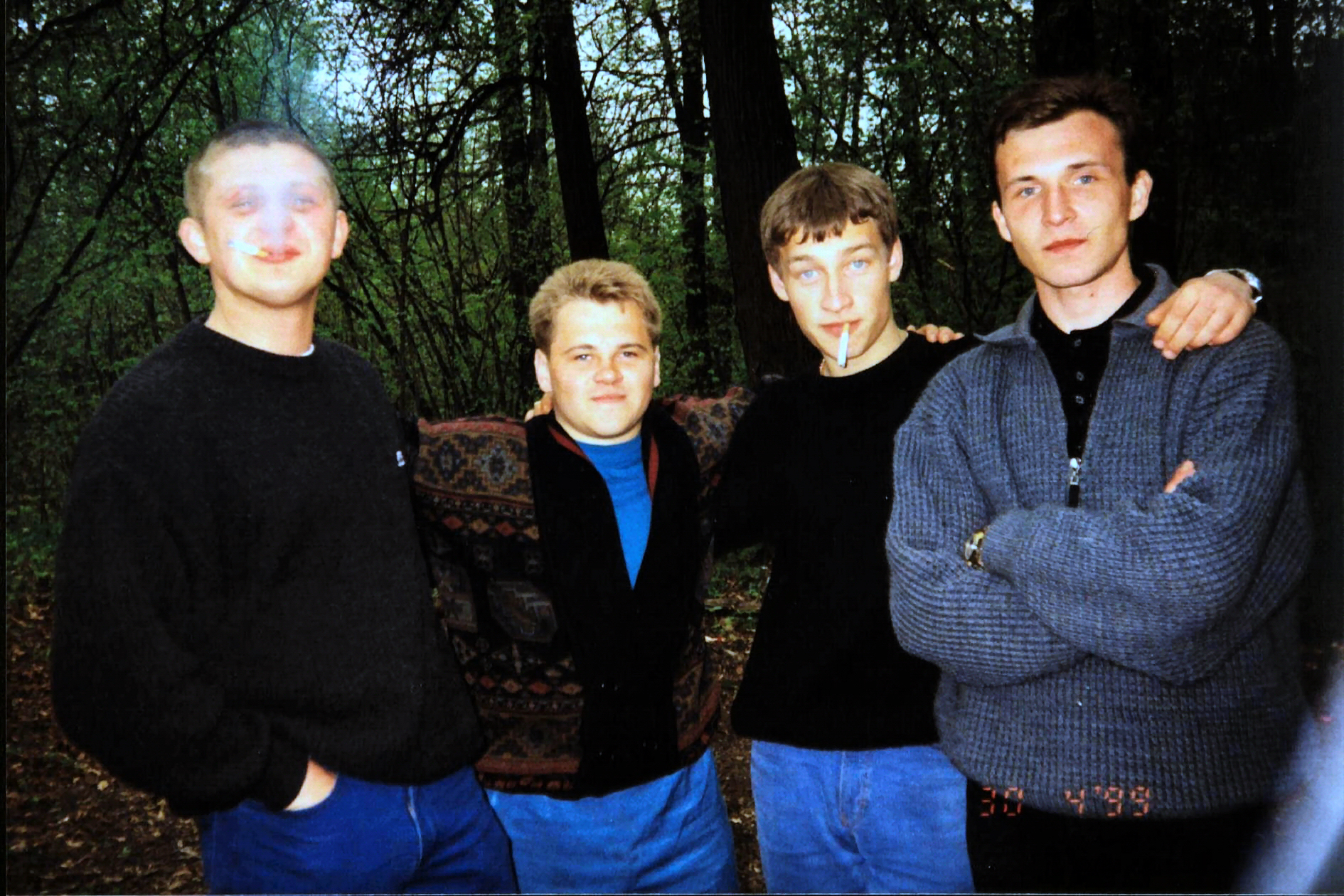
A group of young Russian men wearing blue jeans, late 1990s

The collapse of the USSR in 1991 resulted in the flooding of the consumer market with imported American and European designer clothing, especially blue jeans. Neon colors such as hot pink, orange, turquoise or electric blue, acid wash denim, rhinestone or sequin dresses, black leather jackets, and geometric printed clothing featuring triangles, zigzags, lozenges and lightning bolts were particularly popular in Yeltsin's Russia during the early to mid 1990s. Skater fashion was particularly popular among teenagers in many former Warsaw Pact countries.

Russian fashion during the 2000s and 2010s generally followed Western trends, with slim fitting grey or navy blue suits being particularly popular among professional men. At the same time, however, some traditional accessories such as the ushanka or astrakhan cap made a comeback as part of a backlash against the West, due to many Russians rediscovering their national pride.

Russian fashion media includes Fashion Collection, FashionTV Russia, InStyle Russia, Vogue Russia, Melon Rich, Moda.ru, and La Boheme Magazine.

== Historiography ==
Djurdja Bartlett highlights the difference between the production and consumption of fashion in the USSR (including satellite states such as Czechoslovakia, East Germany, Poland and Yugoslavia) and argued that production through Soviet-style five year plans slowed the development of fashion initially, when comparing these instances with the capitalist West. However, she makes clear that this changed during the post-war period when counter-culture movements began idolising "self-expression by means of clothing".

Olga Gurova discussed for the post-War and Khrushchev period how rather than producing new clothes, citizens would re-use old and worn-out clothes from the post-War period "when eagerness to acquire new fashion prevailed". Larissa Zakharova addressed this fact too and stated this individualistic element of ‘DIY-ing’ clothes was symbolic of Western fashion influence. Zakharova also argued that aside from the individual production of clothes, the fashion industry operated as an arm of state apparatus influenced by Soviet policy and ideology. Both of these modes existing in conjunction demonstrate the "various contradictions" of the Thaw era. In her paper ‘Dior in Moscow’, Zakharova further addresses how the Khrushchev administration tried to bolster the fashion culture in the Soviet Union by providing luxurious items inspired by the haute-couture fashion houses of the West but, at the same time, using this as precedence to secure a tighter grip over Soviet fashion houses.

Historians Mila Oiva, Anna Ivanova and Elena Huber placed women at the forefront of shifting fashion trends. How socialist fashion moved from abject functionality (funktsional’nost) to a desire for stylish items that coincided with the Western ‘haute-couture’ fashion houses largely has to do with the reimagination of the Soviet working woman as a woman that dresses "well and elegantly".

== See also ==
- Deconstruction (fashion) – Abstracted clothing style of the 1980s–90s
- Ushanka – Russian fur cap with ear flaps
- Astrakhan cap – Traditional sheep fur hat of Central and South Asia
- Lenin hat – Cap of type originally often worn by seafarers
- Stilyagi
- 1950s in Russian fashion
- 1960s in Russian fashion
- 1970s in Russian fashion
- 1990s in Russian fashion
- 2010s in Russian fashion
