= Fashion Week Mexico City =

Fashion event in Mexico

Fashion Week Mexico City is a semi-annual fashion week event held in Mexico City, Mexico. The Autumn/Winter fashion week takes place during the late first quarter or the year, and the Spring/Summer fashion week is held during the early fourth quarter or the year.
