= Fornasetti =

Luxury artistic design company

- Founders: Piero Fornasetti
- Key people: Barnaba Fornasetti
- Products: Porcelain, furniture, wallpaper, home fragrances
- Website: fornasetti.com

Fornasetti is a luxury artistic design company founded in 1940 in Milan by Piero Fornasetti, now run by the founder's son, Barnaba Fornasetti, which is known internationally for the creation of porcelain and handmade decorative objects for the home.

== History ==
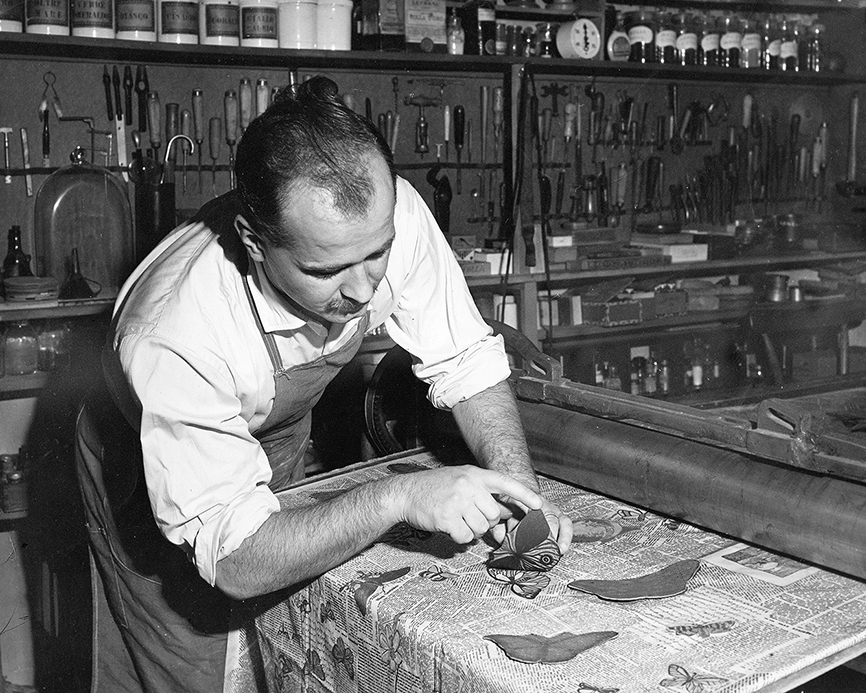
Piero Fornasetti working in his first workshop

The origins of the company lie in the activity of the art printworks that Piero Fornasetti opened in Milan in the 1930s. The "Stamperia d'Arte Fornasetti" enjoyed some success in the Milanese cultural scene; as Raffaele Carrieri wrote in Epoca in 1978: "He was the first to print lithographs of De Chirico in Milan, some considerable time ago". A crucial moment for the foundation of the company was the meeting between Piero Fornasetti and Gio Ponti, in the 1940s, which led to the opening of the Atelier Fornasetti. One of the first successes of the company, and its collaboration with Ponti, was the Architettura trumeau, which was then exhibited at the IX Milan Triennale in 1951, and is now included in the collection of the Victoria and Albert Museum in London.

In the 1950s, Fornasetti used the face of Lina Cavalieri for his series Tema e Variazioni, which over time became one of the icons of the Fornasetti style. Starting with a portrait of the actress, Fornasetti reworked over four hundred "variations", which continue to be developed by the company's creative department to this day. The series won over a large audience of writers and intellectuals: Alberto Moravia dedicated a text to the infinite variations of Lina Cavalieri's face, while Henry Miller chose one of the decorations of the series in 1971 as the cover of his autobiography My Life and Times.

At the end of the 1960s the cultural climate changed, with a decline in decoration in favor of rationalism and function over form. Fornasetti struggled to align himself with the new logic of the market and industrial production. The difficulties encountered in this period also led to a cooling in relations with Ponti, who reproached Fornasetti for being unable to reinvent himself. Fornasetti decided to give continuity to his work with other instruments and forms of expression. He continued to drive the work of his atelier and broadened the scope of his activities to include the cultural sphere. In 1977, together with a group of friends, he ran the Galleria dei Bibliofili, where he exhibited both his own work and that of contemporary artists.

In the early eighties Piero Fornasetti began to work with his son Barnaba. Their collaboration led to a first project, the Archivettura, a car decorated on an architectural theme. In this period, Fornasetti's fame once again garnered the attention of the public: in 1984 the Themes and Variations gallery opened in London on the initiative of Liliane Fawcett, in tribute to the work of the company and its creator. Piero Fornasetti died suddenly in 1988. His son Barnaba decided to continue the business and took over the management of the company. This led to a collaboration between Barnaba Fornasetti and Patrick Mauriès on a first full-length monograph, entitled Designer of Dreams, published in 1991 by Thames & Hudson. This was followed by an exhibition dedicated to the work of Piero Fornasetti at the Victoria and Albert Museum, and finally the launch of an English edition of the monograph, Fornasetti The Complete Universe, published by Rizzoli USA in 2010. In 1993 Barnaba Fornasetti expanded the company's horizons, in terms of product lines, geography and creative collaborations, for example with the world of fashion. This was the year the first collection of Fornasetti clothing was launched, in collaboration with Lawrence Steele.

With the advent of the new millennium, the new head of the company consolidated its presence in the modern panorama, expanding the variety of its output and its interaction with various contemporary artistic personalities. Collaborations multiplied, for example with Nigel Coates in the field of design, with Valentino and Comme des Garçons in the field of fashion, and with a number of contemporary artists, including the British painter Anj Smith.

Recent years have seen the Atelier undertake even more wide-ranging cultural initiatives. For the centenary of the birth of Piero Fornasetti, a retrospective was organised under the title Piero Fornasetti. 100 years of practical madness, presented at the Milan Triennale, the Musée des Arts Décoratifs in Paris and the Dongdaemun Design Plaza in Seoul. There were also exhibitions at the Museo Nazionale Romano Palazzo Altemps in Rome and at Artipelag in Stockholm. In 2015 the Atelier curated the decoration of the Rizzoli bookshop in New York City and the interior decoration of the Teatro dell'Arte at the Milan Triennale. The following year, the Atelier Fornasetti produced an opera, The Rake Punished, or Don Giovanni, involving among others the collaboration of the designer Romeo Gigli. The opera was staged at the aforementioned Teatro dell'Arte in Milan and at the Teatro della Pergola in Florence.

Between 2016 and 2019, two new single-brand stores were opened: a new flagship store in Milan, followed by a store inside Harrods in London. The decade ended with the establishment of Fornasetti Cult, a non-profit association to subsidise cultural projects and initiatives. The 2020s began with a collaboration with Louis Vuitton and Nicolas Ghesquière and with hybridisations in the art world such as the project Eroica: Beethoven and Bonaparte, exploring the link between Ludwig Van Beethoven and Napoleon Bonaparte.

== See also ==
- List of Italian companies
