= 2008 in architecture =

The year 2008 in architecture involved some significant architectural events and new buildings.

== Events ==
- February 10–11 – 2008 Namdaemun fire: The wooden superstructure of the 550-year-old Namdaemun gate in Seoul (South Korea) is destroyed by arson.
- June 20 – The Architects (Recognition of European Qualifications etc and Saving and Transitional Provision) Regulations 2008 comes into force in the UK.
- July 8 – The first in Francesco da Mosto's television series Francesco's Mediterranean Voyage is broadcast.
- October 2 – The William L. Slayton House, designed by I. M. Pei in 1958, is listed in the United States National Register of Historic Places.
- October – The inaugural World Architecture Festival is held in Barcelona.

== Buildings and structures ==
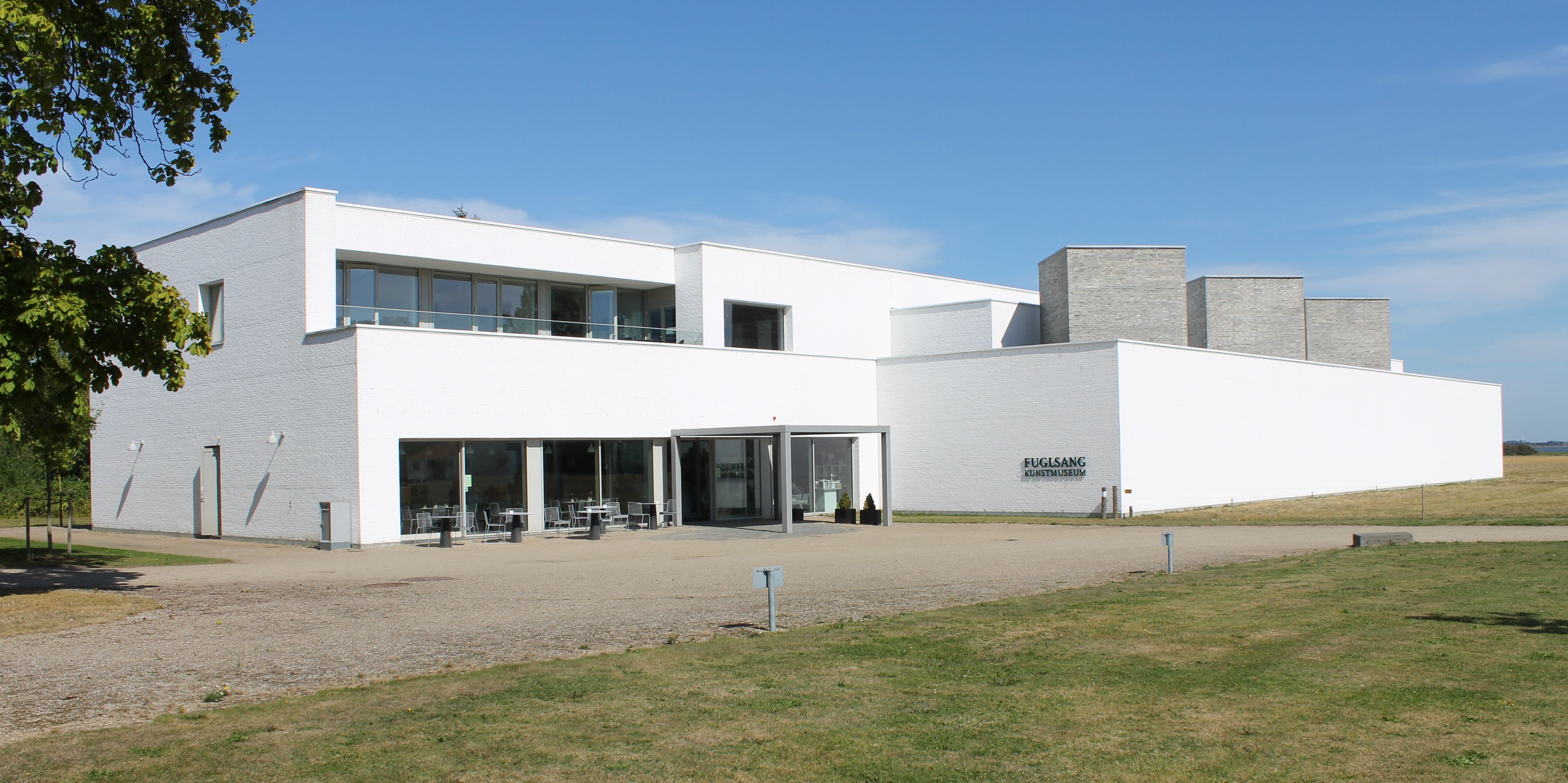
Fuglsang Art Museum in Lolland, Denmark

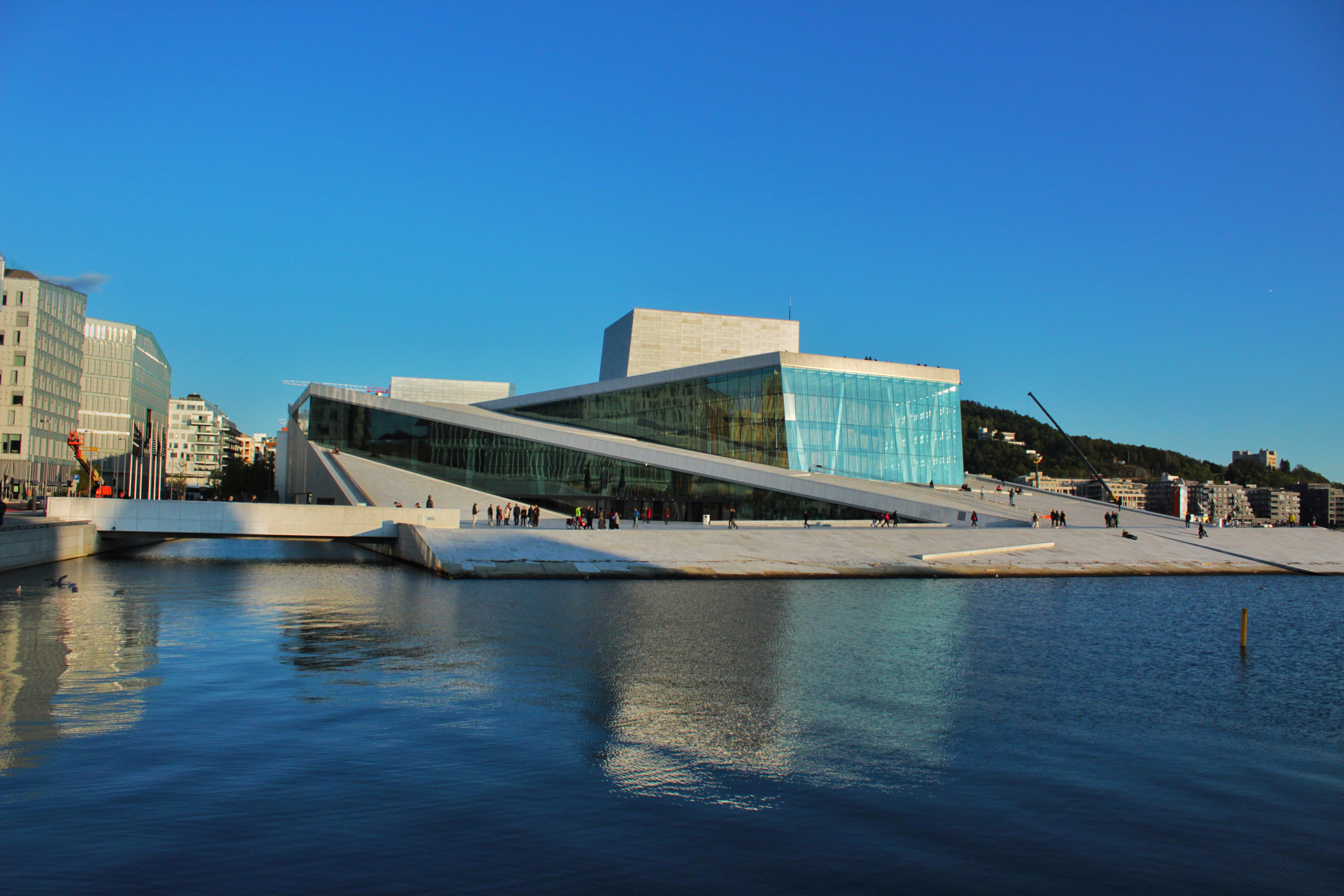
New National Opera House in Oslo, Norway

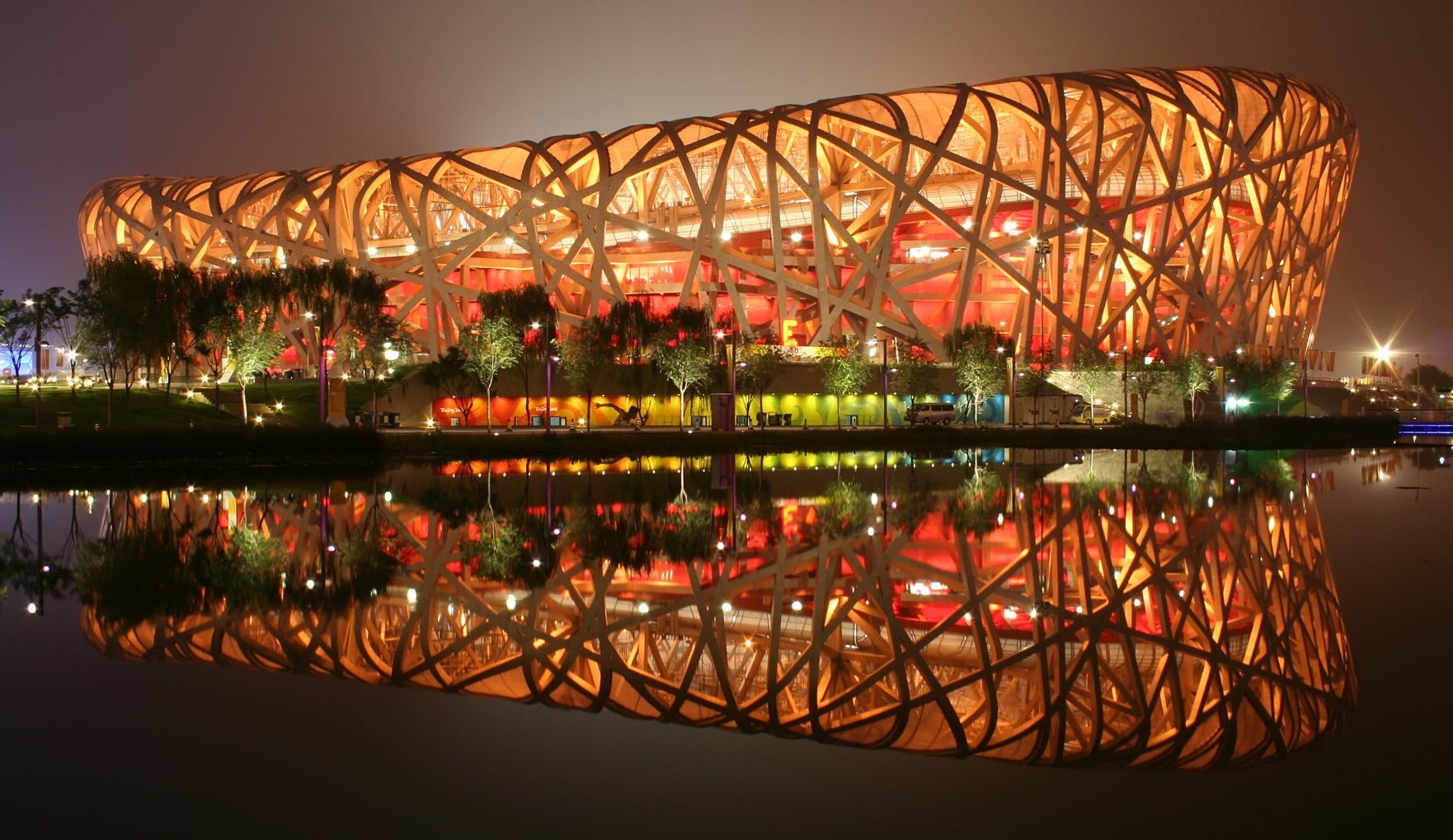
Beijing National Stadium

=== Buildings opened ===
- January 1 – China Central Television Headquarters building in Beijing, by Rem Koolhaas and OMA, officially opens.
- January 12 – New Amundsen–Scott South Pole Station officially inaugurated.
- January – Fuglsang Art Museum in Lolland, Denmark, designed by Tony Fretton, inaugurated.
- March 26 – Terminal 3 of the Beijing Capital International Airport opens, designed by Foster + Partners.
- March 27 – Heathrow Terminal 5, designed by the Richard Rogers Partnership, opens.
- April 12 – New National Opera House in Oslo opens.
- April – Maggie's Centre in London, a drop-in cancer care centre designed by Rogers Stirk Harbour + Partners, opens (Stirling Prize 2009).
- June – Contemporary Jewish Museum in San Francisco, designed by Daniel Libeskind, opened.
- June 25 – Chords Bridge ("Bridge of Strings") in Jerusalem, designed by Santiago Calatrava, inaugurated.
- June 28 – Beijing National Stadium designed by Herzog & de Meuron (known as the "Bird's Nest"), opened for the 2008 Summer Olympics.
- August 1 – Beijing South railway station, designed by Terry Farrell, opened.
- September
  - A. P. Møller School, Schleswig, Germany, designed by C. F. Møller Architects.
  - Darwin Centre II, Natural History Museum, London, designed by C. F. Møller Architects.
- September 11 – Ponte della Costituzione in Venice, designed by Santiago Calatrava, inaugurated.
- September 24 – Atlantis The Palm in Dubai, United Arab Emirates.
- September 27 – California Academy of Sciences in Golden Gate Park, San Francisco, designed by Renzo Piano.
- October 16 – Weill Hall, Cornell University, designed by Richard Meier
- November – New Ahus, Akershus University Hospital, Oslo, Norway, designed by C. F. Møller Architects, opened.
- November 11 – Curve (theatre) in Leicester, England, designed by Rafael Viñoly, is opened.
- November 20 – Peter B. Lewis Library at Princeton University, by Frank Gehry, officially dedicated.
- November 22 – Museum of Islamic Art, Doha, in Qatar, designed by I. M. Pei, is officially opened.
- The Public, West Bromwich, England, designed by Will Alsop, opens first stages to public.

=== Buildings completed ===
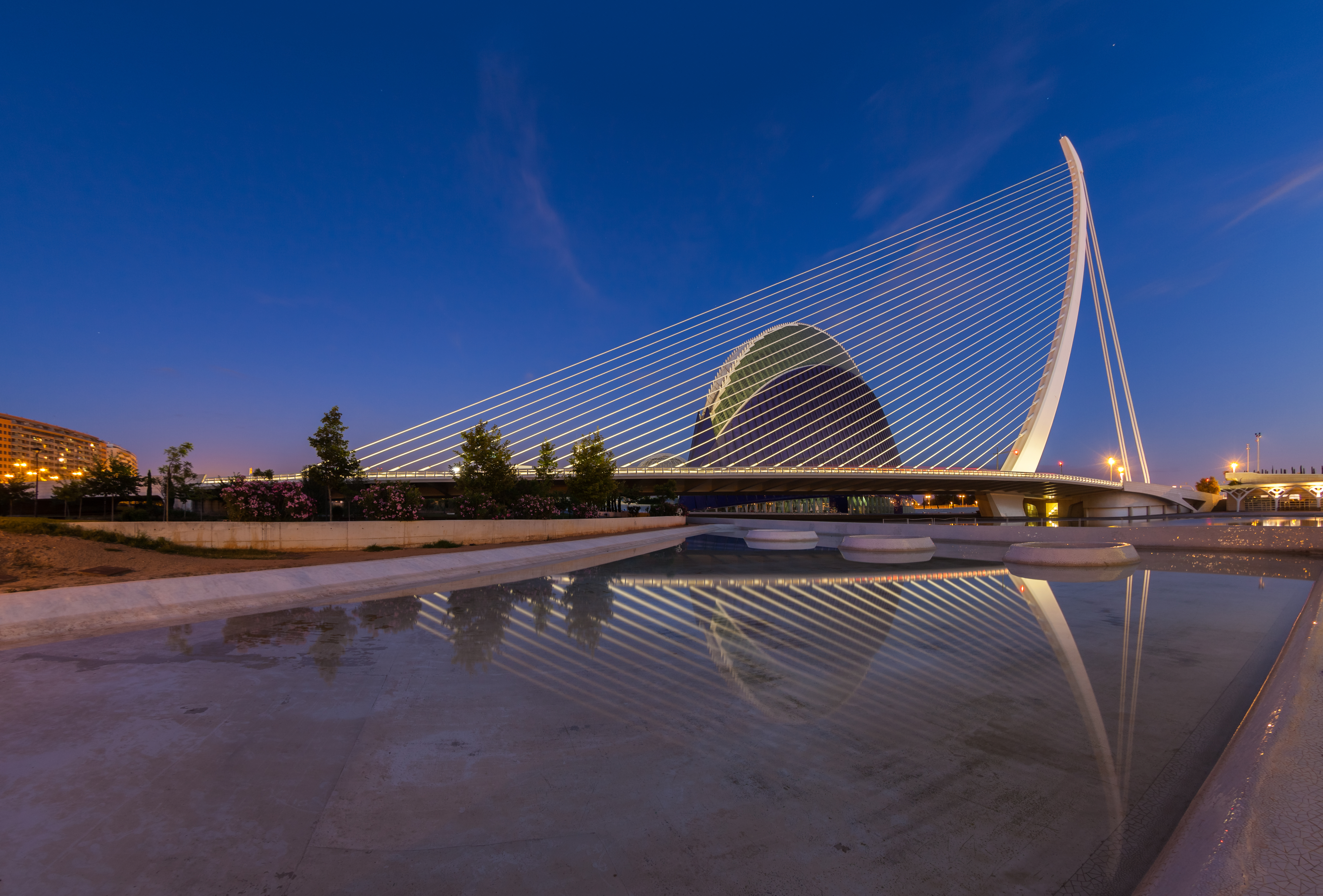
Assut de l'Or in Valencia, Spain

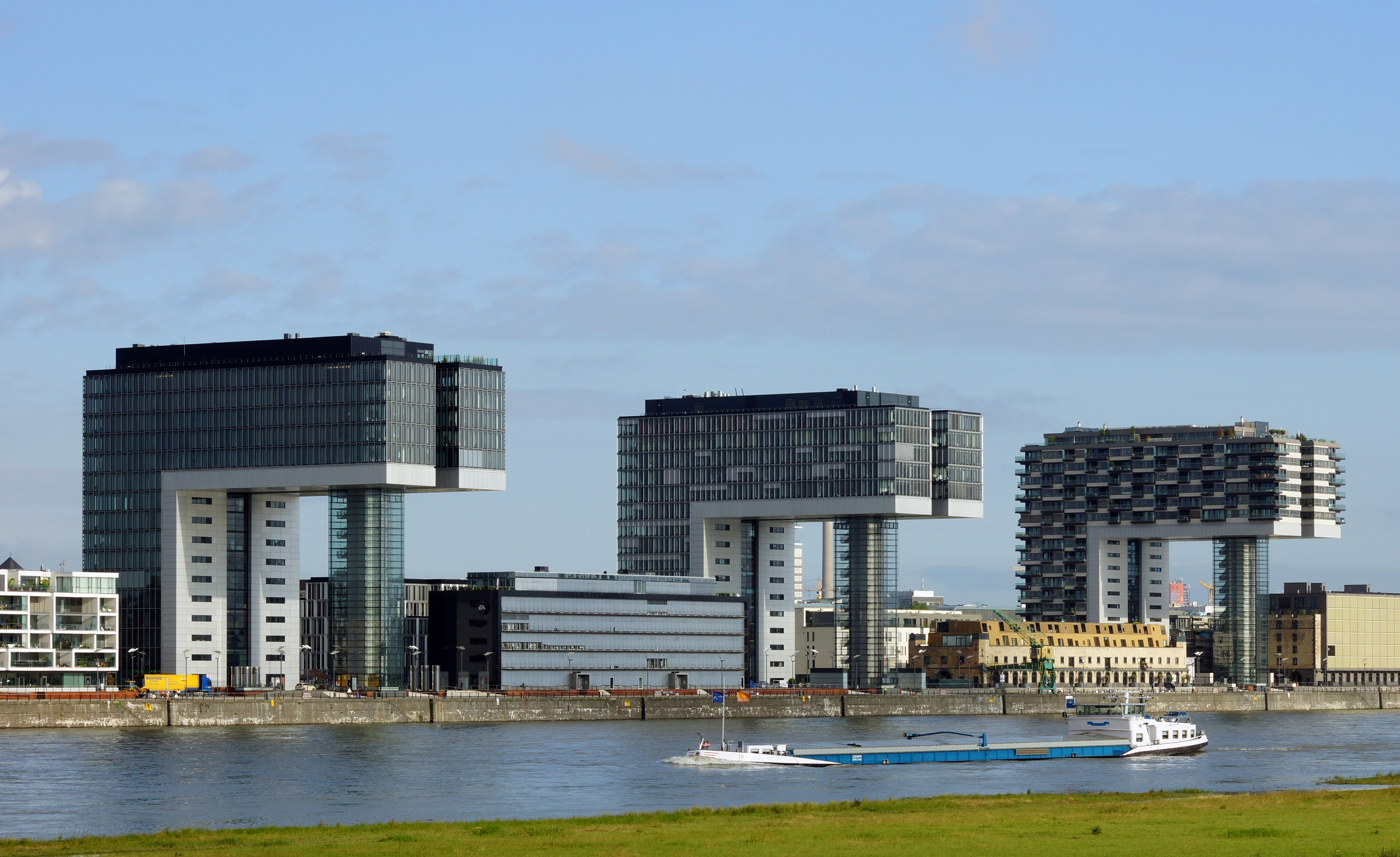
Kranhaus in Rheinauhafen, Cologne, Germany

- January 28 – Beijing National Aquatics Center, known as the "Water Cube", in readiness for the 2008 Summer Olympics.
- August 28 – Shanghai World Financial Center in Pudong, Shanghai, China, designed by William Pedersen.
- November – Transformation AGO (Art Gallery of Ontario) renovation by Frank Gehry.
- December – Assut de l'Or Bridge in Valencia, Spain, designed by Santiago Calatrava.
- date unknown
  - Remodelling of Lumen United Reformed Church in Bloomsbury, London, designed by Theis + Khan Architects.
  - Mountain Dwellings, Copenhagen, Denmark, designed by Bjarke Ingels.
  - Linked Hybrid, a nine-tower high-rise housing project by Steven Holl Architects, in Beijing, China.
  - 459 West 18th Street, Manhattan, a high-rise condominium designed by Della Valle + Bernheimer.
  - Living Shangri-La in Vancouver, Canada
  - Torre Caja Madrid (Caja Madrid Tower), Spain, designed by Foster and Partners.
  - First Kranhaus in Rheinauhafen, Cologne, Germany, designed by Alfons Linster and Hadi Teherani of BRT Architekten.
  - Westside shopping and leisure complex, Bern, Switzerland, designed by Daniel Libeskind.
  - Olnik Spanu House, Garrison, New York, United States, designed by Alberto Campo Baeza.
  - Library and Learning Center of the University of Vienna, by Zaha Hadid
  - Moliner House, Zaragoza, Spain, designed by Alberto Campo Baeza.
  - The Grey House, Highgate, London. Designed by Eldridge Smerin.

== Awards ==
- American Academy of Arts and Letters Gold Medal – Richard Meier
- AIA Gold Medal – Renzo Piano (Italy)
- Architecture Firm Award – KieranTimberlake Associates
- Driehaus Architecture Prize – Andrés Duany and Elizabeth Plater-Zyberk
- Emporis Skyscraper Award – Mode Gakuen Cocoon Tower in Shinjuku, Tokyo
- Grand Prix de l'urbanisme – David Mangin
- Lawrence Israel Prize – AvroKO
- LEAF Award, Grand Prix – schmidt hammer lassen for Performers House
- Praemium Imperiale Architecture Award – Peter Zumthor
- Pritzker Prize – Jean Nouvel
- Rome Prize for architecture – Frederick B. Fisher
- RAIA Gold Medal – Richard Johnson
- RIBA Royal Gold Medal – Edward Cullinan
- Stirling Prize – Feilden Clegg Bradley Studios, Alison Brooks Architects and Maccreanor Lavington for Accordia housing development, Cambridge
- Thomas Jefferson Medal in Architecture – Gro Harlem Brundtland
- Twenty-five Year Award – The Atheneum
- UIA Gold Medal – Teodoro Gonzalez de Leon
- Vincent Scully Prize – Robert A. M. Stern

== Deaths ==
- January 1 – Harald Deilmann, German architect (born 1920)
- January 30 – Fernando Higueras, Spanish architect (born 1930)
- February 9 – Carm Lino Spiteri, Maltese architect and politician (born 1932)
- March 5 – Nader Khalili, Iranian architect, writer, and humanitarian (born 1936)
- March 24 – Victor Christ-Janer, American modernist architect (born 1915)
- March 29 – Ralph Rapson, American architect (born 1914)
- March 31 – David Todd, American architect (born 1915)
- May 30 – Rodney Gordon, English architect (born 1933)
- June 15 – Walter Netsch, American architect (born 1920)
- July 6 – George Tibbits, Australian composer and architect (born 1933)
- September 18 – Abdur Rahman Hye, Pakistani architect (born 1919)
- November 14 – Sir Bernard Feilden, English conservation architect (born 1919)
- November 29 – Jørn Utzon, Danish architect (born 1918)

== See also ==
- Timeline of architecture
