= Francesco's Italy: Top to Toe =

2006 British television series

- Genre: Travel documentary
- Presented by: Francesco da Mosto
- Country of origin: United Kingdom
- Original language: English
- No. of episodes: 4

Production
- Running time: 60 minutes

Original release
- Network: BBC Two
- Release: 11 June – 2 July 2006

Related
- Francesco's Venice; Francesco's Mediterranean Voyage

Francesco's Italy: Top to Toe is a four-part BBC television series hosted by Francesco da Mosto and originally shown on BBC Two from 11 June to 2 July 2006. In the series, da Mosto drives his Alfa Romeo Spider the length of Italy, from North to South, exploring the architecture and traditions in different regions.

This series was rebroadcast by the Travel Channel in January 2007 and repeated on BBC2 in May 2007 and BBC Four in October–November 2007. The series was rebroadcast in Canada on the Knowledge channel during July and August 2011.

During Episode 1, "The Romantic North", da Mosto left his native Venice and his family, and visited the Fiat Factory in Turin, Romeo and Juliet's balcony in Verona and the city of Milan.

During Episode 2, "The Garden of Italy", da Mosto visited a 19th-century reproduction of Michelangelo's David in Florence, the city of Siena and the town of Assisi.

In Episode 3, entitled "The Heart of Italy" da Mosto visited the Trevi Fountain, explores Italians love/hate relationship with Benito Mussolini, visiting the city of Sabaudia, Rome and Naples, its underground secrets and the beautiful Chapel of St. Severo.

In the fourth episode, "The Land of My Mother", da Mosto travelled to Puglia where he visited the Trulli buildings; after that he went to Sicily where he climbed the summit of Mount Etna and explored the Capuchin catacombs of Palermo with its array of mummified bodies – before being reunited with his family at last.
