= Masayuki Ino =

Japanese fashion designer (born 1979)

- Born: 1979 (age 46–47); Gunma Prefecture, Japan
- Education: Tokyo Mode Gakuen
- Occupations: Fashion designer; businessman
- Label: Doublet
- Awards: Winner, LVMH Prize (2018)
- Website: doublet-jp.com

Masayuki Ino (Japanese: 井野 将之, Hepburn: Ino Masayuki; born 1979) is a Japanese fashion designer. He founded the luxury streetwear label Doublet in 2012 alongside patternmaker Takashi Murakami, and in 2018 became the first Asian designer to win the LVMH Prize.

== Early life and education ==
Ino was born in 1979 in Gunma Prefecture, and studied at the Tokyo Mode Gakuen. He then worked as an apprentice of Mihara Yasuhiro, where he was later appointed head of footwear and accessory design. Ino has been described as a "long-term protege" of Yasuhiro.

== Career ==
In 2012, Ino founded his own brand, Doublet, with Takashi Murakami, a patternmaker who had been his colleague at Mihara Yasuhiro. Doublet took its name from the word puzzle invented by Lewis Carroll, and he set out an idea of creating pieces "with a feel of disorder". His fashion designs are gender-neutral. The first Doublet collection debuted for spring 2013.

His signature style has been described as deconstructed and layered, with an emphasis on embroidery. He is also known for his creative presentations of his clothing, from pieces sold in goblets to artistic hangers.

He has collaborated with Valentino, mixing his style with the Valentino logo, and has collaborated with the bag company NewNeu to create a skateboard-shaped bag covered in velcro. His collaboration with shoe brand ASICS was intended to look like cardboard.

He won the professional division of the Tokyo New Designer Fashion Award in 2013 and the Tokyo Fashion Award in 2017; the latter brought exhibitions in Paris and Doublet's first runway show, held during the Fall 2017 season of Tokyo Fashion Week. He has been a member of the Business of Fashion 500 since 2022. His pieces have been worn by Kendall Jenner, Travis Scott, and Liam Payne.

He was awarded the LVMH Prize in 2018, becoming the first Asian to earn the prize; the win came with a €300,000 grant and a year of mentorship from LVMH. He was seen as an unexpected choice, due to his low profile outside of Japan, but was selected due to his creativity in both his outfits and their packaging: in the final round, he presented noodle pots that released shirts after being filled with water.

Doublet's first Paris Fashion Week presentation came for Fall 2020, a show that turned a Paris venue into a make-believe Tokyo family restaurant, with displays of artificial food and street-cast models carrying trays down the runway. Doublet's production is intentionally scarce, and is available only through select boutique stores such as Dover Street Market. As of 2026, Doublet's stockists include 10 Corso Como and Lane Crawford.

In Tokyo during the COVID-19 pandemic, Doublet staged its Spring 2021 show in a French restaurant turned haunted mansion, where a small live audience wearing virtual reality goggles watched models made up as zombies. For his Fall 2022 collection, inspired by the Tokyo Paralympics, he staged an "analogue metaverse" on a full-size replica of the Shibuya Crossing, with models of different body types wearing identical masks and pink wigs.

His Fall/Winter 2023 collection featured an amusement park and fantastical looks which included, in the words of Hypebeast, "furry looks and voguing mice". His Fall 2024 collection drew on a haunted house. His SS25 collection was inspired by anime and the idea of an oshi. His Fall/Winter 2025 was inspired by villains including the Cheshire Cat and The Joker, and used darker themes than his typical. His Spring 2026 collection featured haybale seating. His Fall 2026 collection, titled "Air", was widely acclaimed, and featured balloons and bubble wrap, and utilized a yarn that is made from captured CO2. His Spring 2027 collection featured a theme of people at three different times: morning, noon, and night. The show teased a new collaboration with Puma and introduced pieces made with recycled charcoal, banana fiber, and wood.

He is also known for his online demonstrations of his outfits, including demonstrations featuring individuals in drag.
