= Francesco's Venice =

- Genre: Documentary
- Presented by: Francesco da Mosto
- Country of origin: United Kingdom
- No. of seasons: 1
- No. of episodes: 4

Original release
- Network: BBC Two
- Release: October 16 – November 6, 2004

Francesco's Venice is a four-part BBC television documentary series hosted by Francesco da Mosto and first broadcast on BBC2 in 2004. The series follows da Mosto as he explores the history of Venice, beginning with its creation in the 5th century and concluding in the modern era. Each episode focuses upon a certain area of Venetian history, interlaced with various anecdotes from da Mosto's own experiences and family history. A book of the same name was published to accompany the series in 2004. Renowned cinematographer and Artist Fred Fabre achieved distinction in 2005 when he was honoured with a BAFTA for his outstanding work on the series.

#	Episode	Content	Original Broadcast
1	"Blood"	da Mosta family history, Doge of Venice, origins of Venice St. Mark, St. Mark's Square	16 October 2004
2	"Beauty"	Andrea Palladio, Marco Polo, Rialto Bridge, The Venetian Empire	23 October 2004
3	"Sex"	Antonio Vivaldi, Black Death, Giacomo Casanova, Napoleon's Invasion	30 October 2004
4	"Death"	Byron, Venetian Conservationist Movement, tourism, Venice's future	6 November 2004

== See also ==
- Francesco's Italy: Top to Toe
- Francesco's Mediterranean Voyage
