= Diego Vanassibara =

Diego Vanassibara (born 1983) is a London-based shoe designer from Caxias do Sul, Rio Grande do Sul, Brazil.

Vanassibara moved to England when he was 22 after studying architecture in Brazil. In London, he trained at the Cordwainer's College of footwear and launched his self-named label in 2013. In the same year, he won the Footwear Friends Awards from the British Footwear Association.

After being the first male shoe designer to receive the NEWGEN Men Award from the British Fashion Council, he was also a recipient of the initiative for six full seasons (AW14 – SS17).

Often presenting his collections at London Collection Men and Paris Men's Fashion Week. Rather than a traditional catwalk show, every season the designer showcases his work in the form of custom-made installations, which in some opinions have become a Diego Vanassibara seasonal tradition in the London calendar.

He is known for being featured by Footwear News as one of the rising talents in the high-end men's footwear, and noted by GQ Brazil as one of the emerging designers to join the elite of British fashion.

Diego Vanassibara footwear was already early on stocked worldwide at the Japanese stores Isetan and Dover Street Market Ginza, the French boutique L’Eclaireur, the Hong Kong–based shops Joyce and On Pedder among others.

His early work was characterized by incorporating on the shoes hand-carved wooden details made by artisans from Java, Indonesia. This was noted by GQ South Africa, arguing that the brand's heart lies in craftsmanship and innovation. Brazilian influences, architecture, and nature are recurring themes of the label's collections.

The brand also had two collaborations with Japanese designer Mihara Yasuhiro in 2015 for two of its shows during Paris Men's Fashion week. Within the same year, WWD mentioned Diego Vanassibara as one of the brands in its article: “The Dress Shoe Makes A Comeback,” describing shoes as a sports car for the foot.
