= Ca' da Mosto =

Coordinates: 45°26′23″N 12°20′09″E

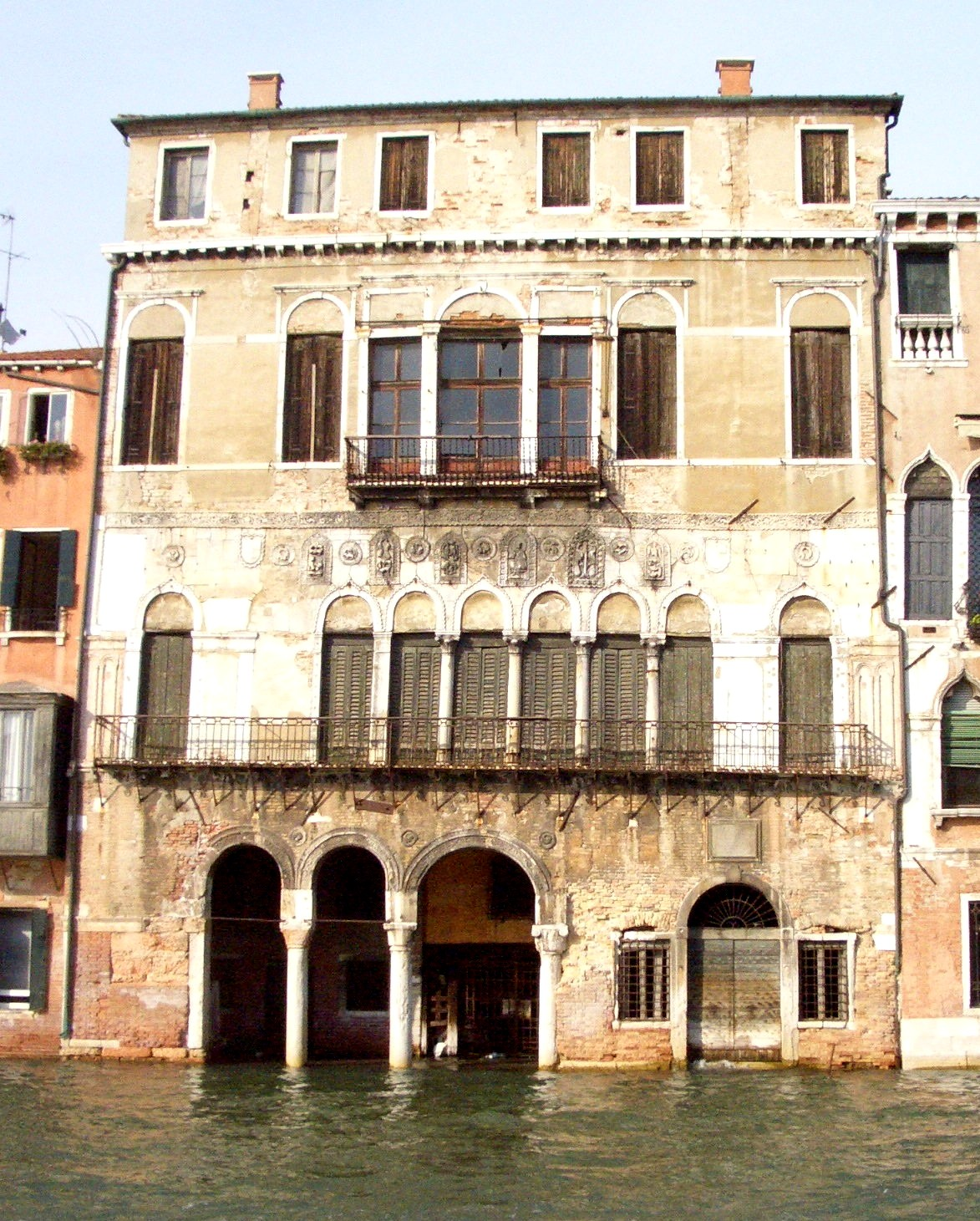
- The derelict Ca' da Mosto in 2005, prior to its refurbishment
- Interactive map of the Ca' da Mosto area

General information
- Type: Palace
- Architectural style: Byzantine
- Location: Venice, Italy

Website
- Venice Venice Hotel

The Ca' da Mosto is a 13th-century Venetian-Byzantine style palace, the oldest on the Grand Canal, located between the Rio dei Santi Apostoli and the Palazzo Bollani Erizzo, in the sestiere of Cannaregio in Venice, Italy. Today, it is home to the Venice Venice Hotel.

== Architecture ==
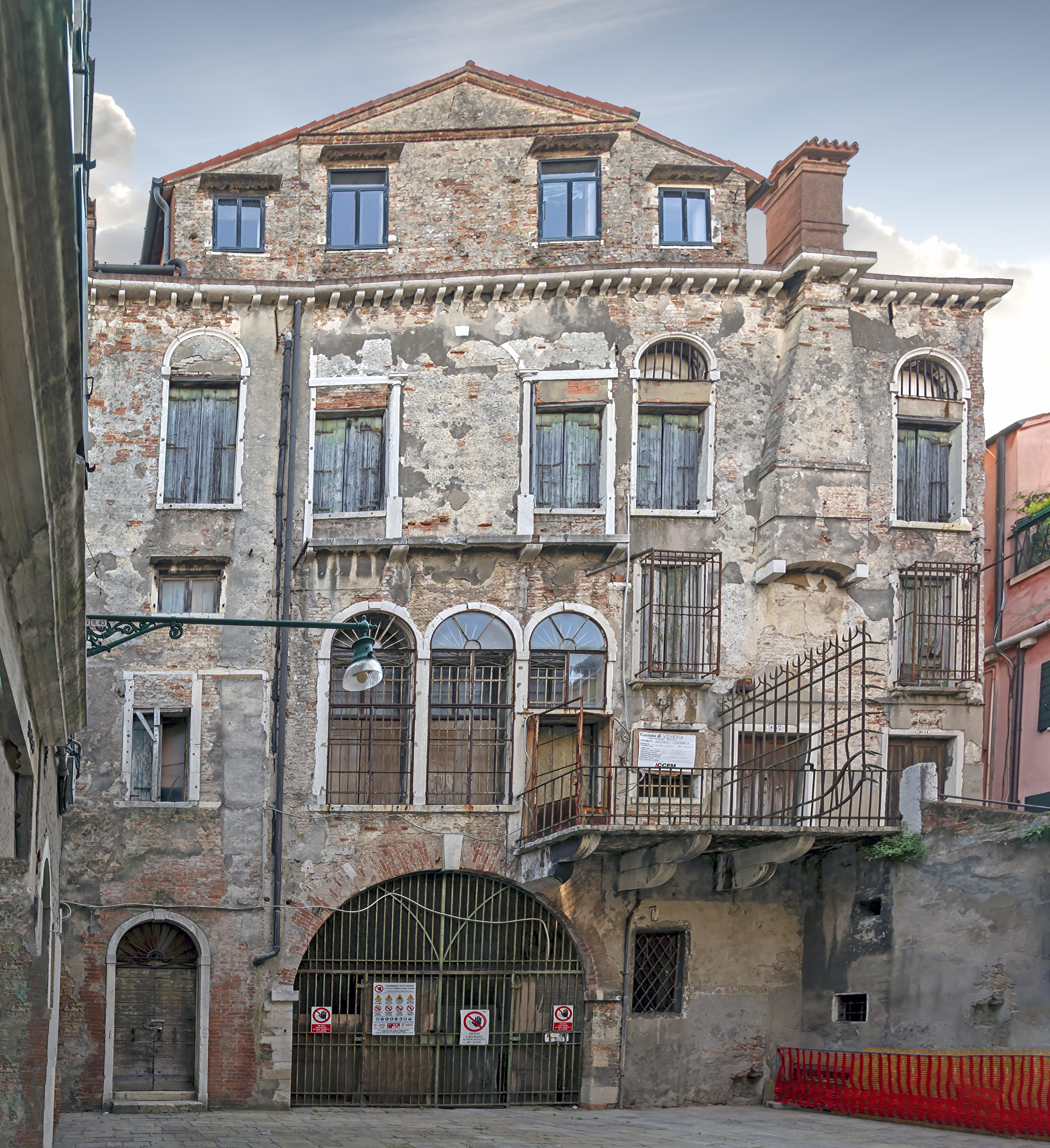
Ca' Da Mosto - facade on Campiello del Leon Bianco

The palace has high narrow arches and distinctive capitals. The features show its beginnings as a casa-fondaco, the home and workplace of its original merchant owner. A second floor was added at the beginning of the sixteenth century, and a third in the nineteenth. The central part of the first floor is decorated with a wide heptafora with leftmost opening currently closed up.

== History ==
The palace dates from the early 13th century; some studies, however, suggest that the structure is even older. Originally owned by the Barozzi family, the property was purchased by Marco da Mosto of the da Mosto family in 1266, from which the palace takes its name. The most famous da Mosto was Alvise Cadamosto, an Italian explorer who worked with slave traders in Portugal, and who was born in the palace in 1432. It stayed in the da Mosto family until 1603, when Chiara da Mosto left her entire estate to Leonardo Donà dalle Rose of the Donà family, a nephew of her second husband, rather than to her da Mosto relatives, with whom she had fallen out.

Between the 16th and the 18th centuries, the Ca' da Mosto housed the well-known Albergo Leon Bianco ("White Lion Hotel"). In 1769 and 1775 the Holy Roman Emperor and son of Maria Theresa, Joseph II, lived here during his stay in Venice.

== Present day ==
The Ca' da Mosto sat empty for decades prior to 2019, with the high waters of the canal having breached its basement. According to an interview in The Lady, the palace is admired by Francesco da Mosto, a descendant of its eponymous former owners, and is the Venetian building he would most like to see restored.

The Ca' da Mosto has since undergone a €3 million restoration, followed by an €8.7 million investment intended to transform the palace into the luxury Venice Venice Hotel. Beginning in January 2019, renovation works were originally scheduled for completion in 2020, but the COVID-19 pandemic delayed the hotel's opening until February 2022.

== See also ==
- Palazzo Falier, also one of the oldest Venetian buildings.

== Sources ==
- Francesco da Mosto, Francesco's Venice (London: BBC, 2004)
