= Paul Noritaka Tange =

Japanese architect

- Born: Tokyo
- Education: Gakushūin; Institut Le Rosey; Harvard University
- Occupation: Architect
- Parent: Kenzō Tange
- Buildings: Cocoon Tower
- Website: en.tangeweb.com

Paul Noritaka Tange (Japanese: 丹下ポール憲孝) is a Japanese architect who currently leads Tange Associates. He is the eldest son of the late architect Kenzō Tange.

== Biography ==
Tange was born in 1958 and received his primary education at Gakushūin in Tokyo. At the age of 14, he moved to Switzerland to study at Institut Le Rosey. He later pursued higher education at Harvard University in the United States, where his father had been invited to lecture.

In his second year at university, he told his father that he intended to become an architect. After 30 seconds of pause, Kenzo Tange responded with the advice: 'Since you only live once, do whatever you truly love as a lifelong passion'. Kenzo also famously encouraged Noritaka to 'focus on one thing for 72 hours'.

== Projects ==
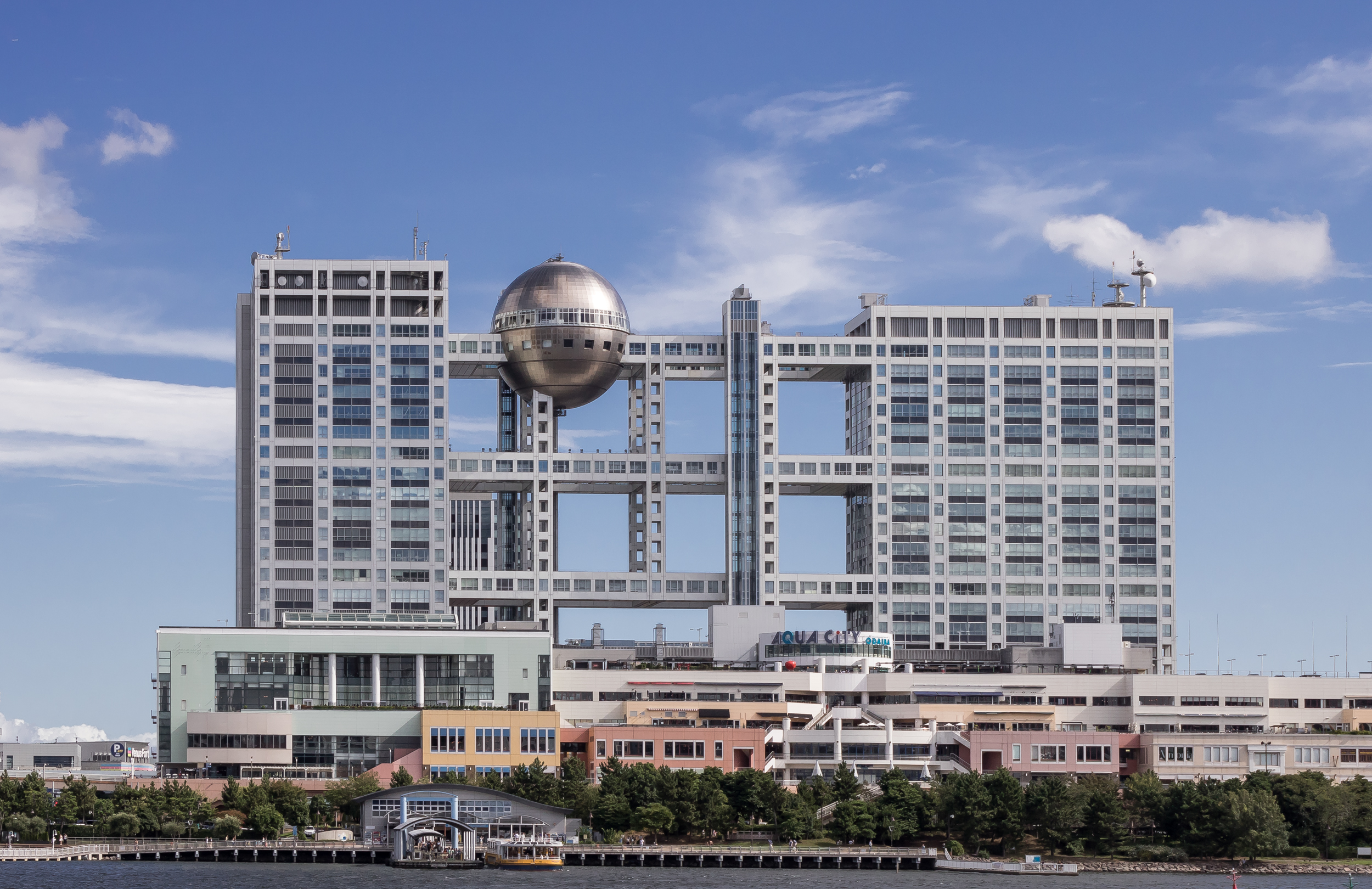
FCG Building (1996)

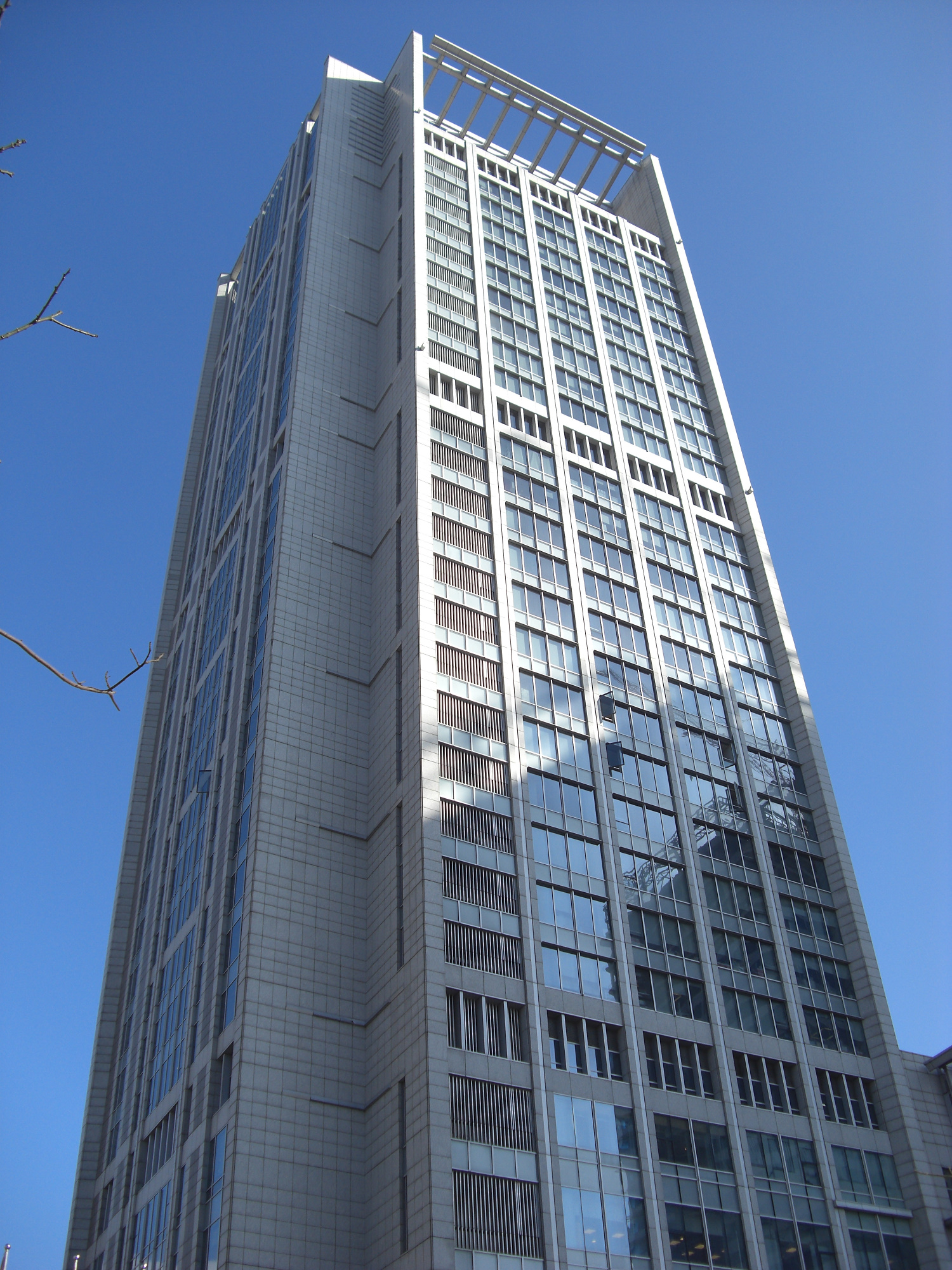
Uni-President International Tower, Taipei (2004

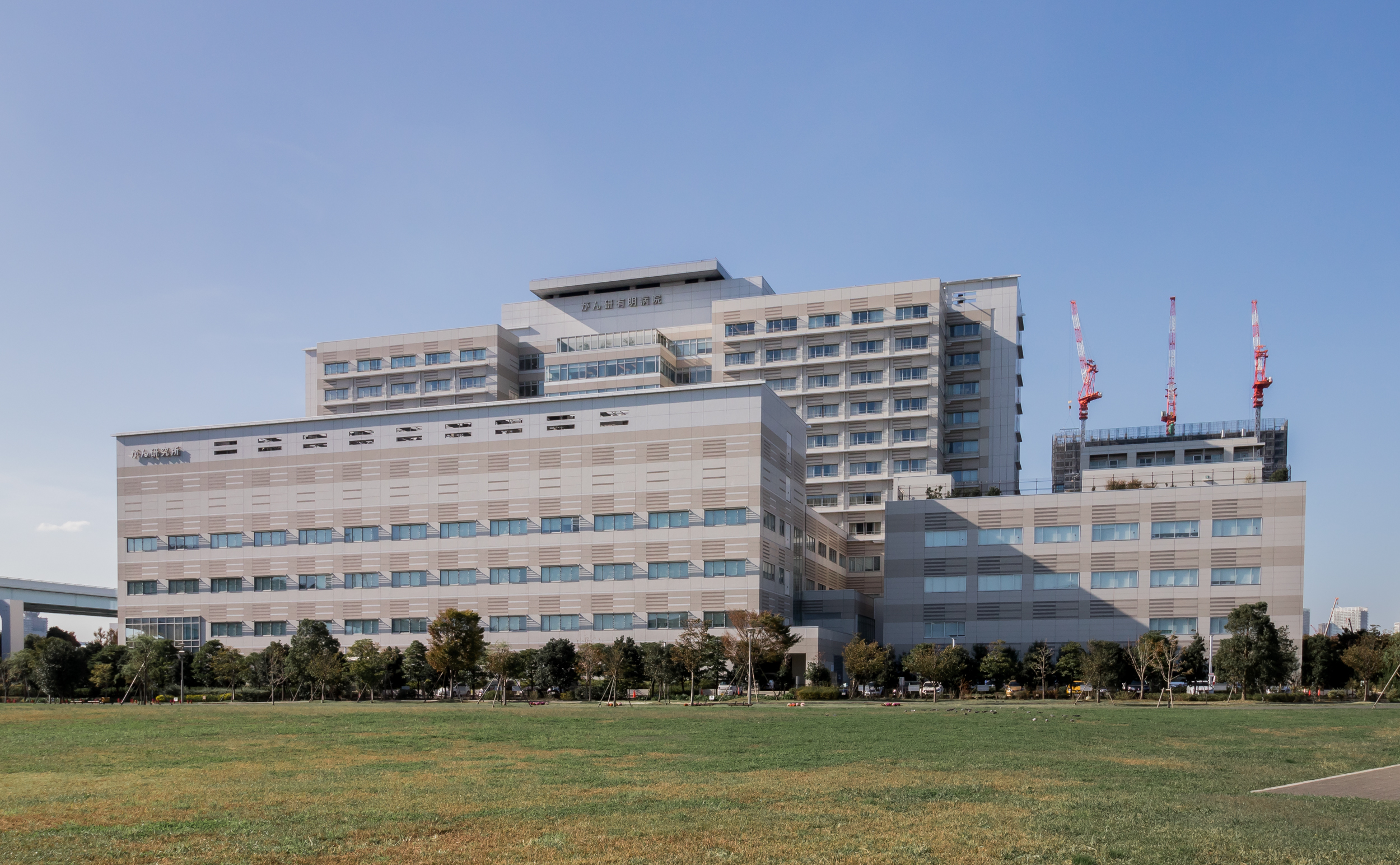
Cancer Institute Hospital of the Japanese Foundation for Cancer Research (2005)

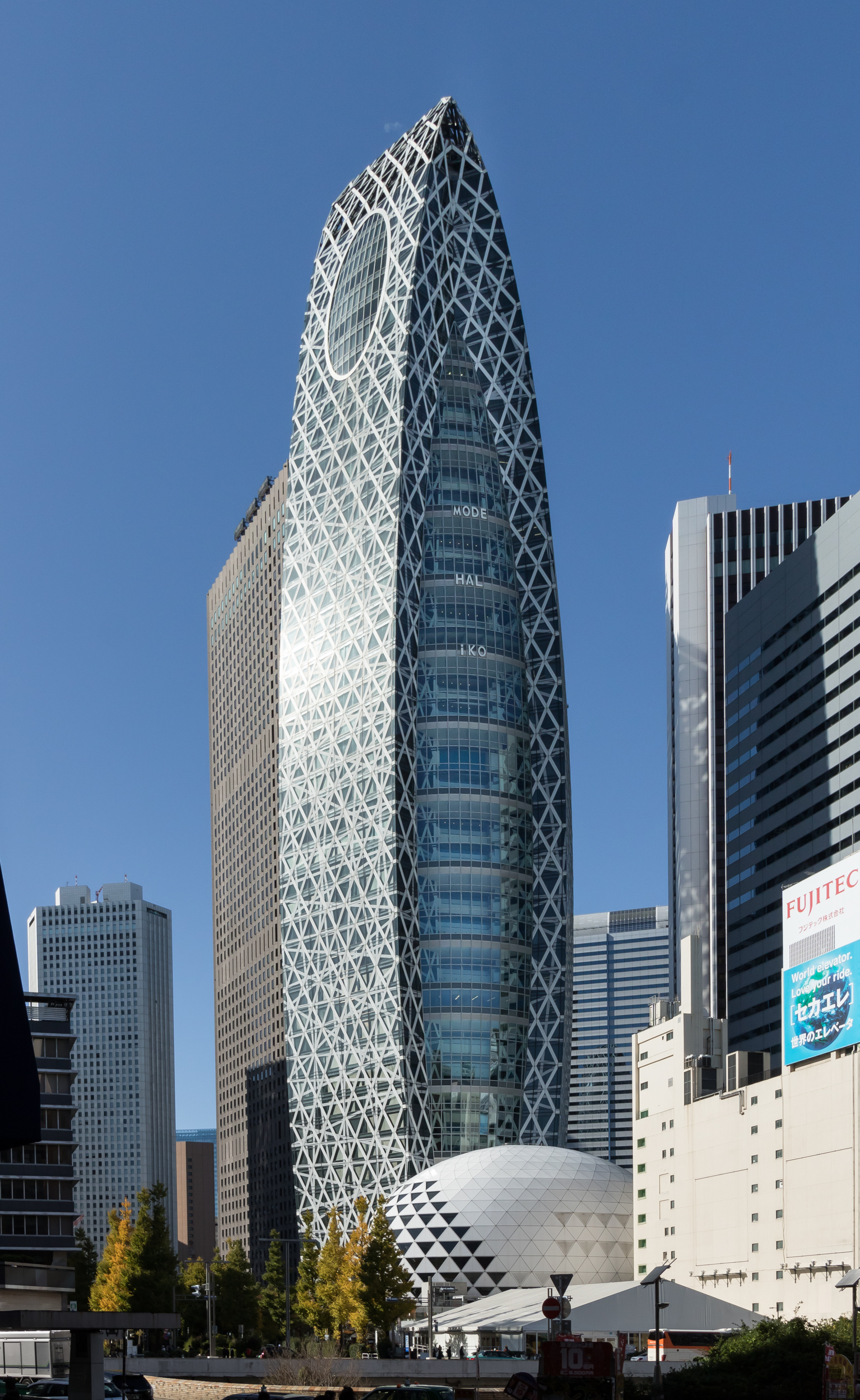
Cocoon Tower (2008)

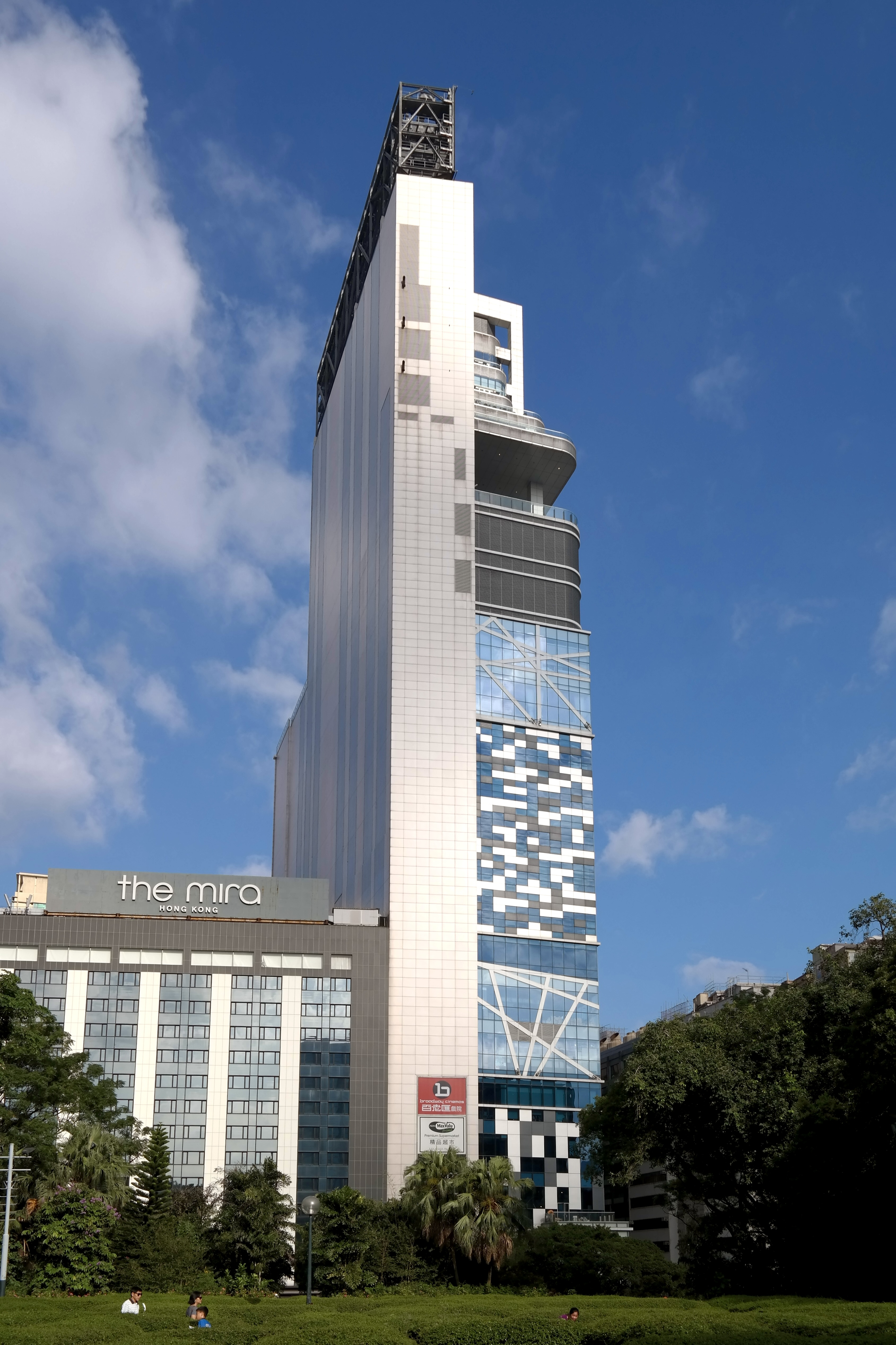
The ONE skyscraper (2010)

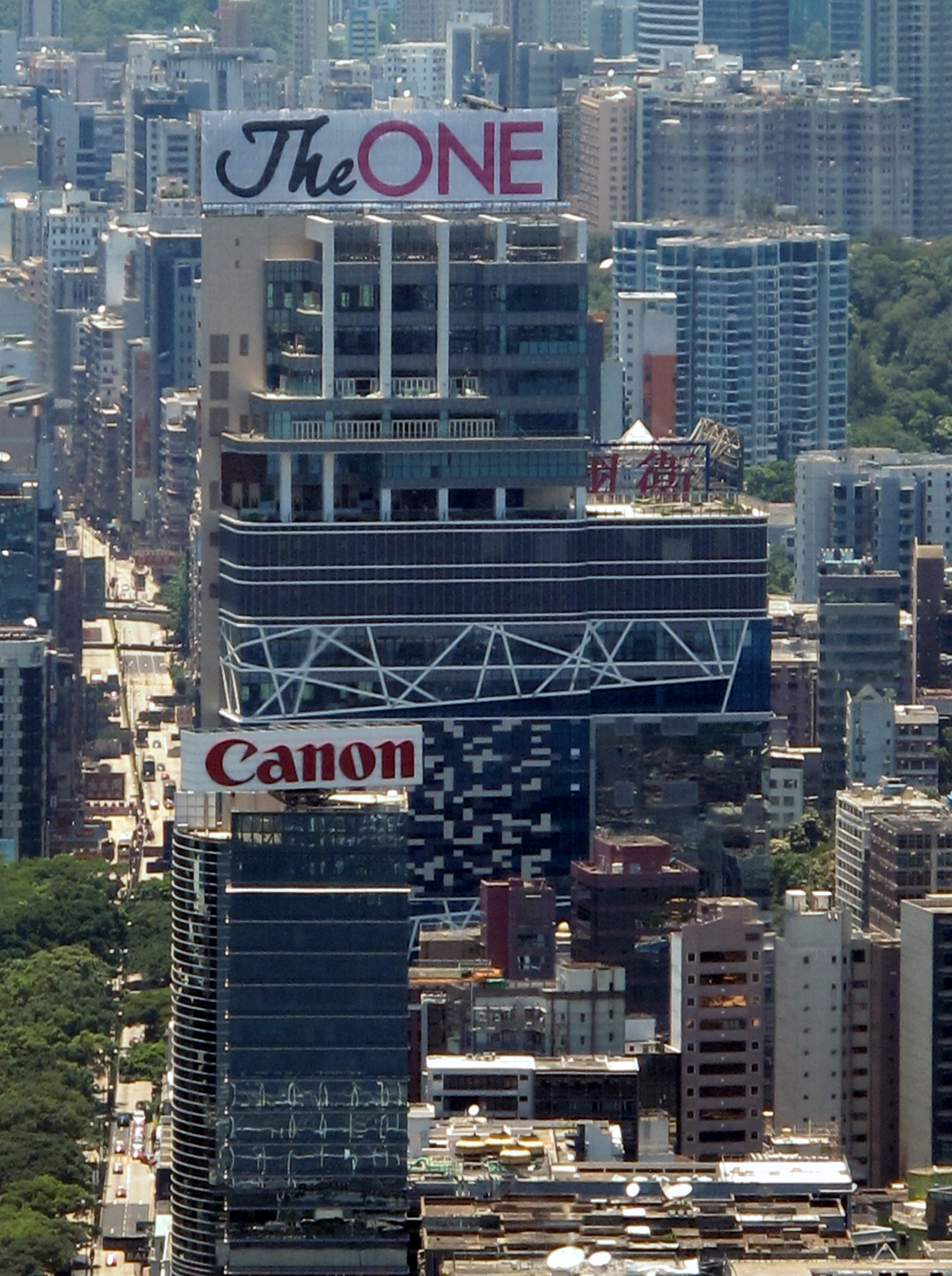
The ONE shopping centre, Hong Kong (2010)

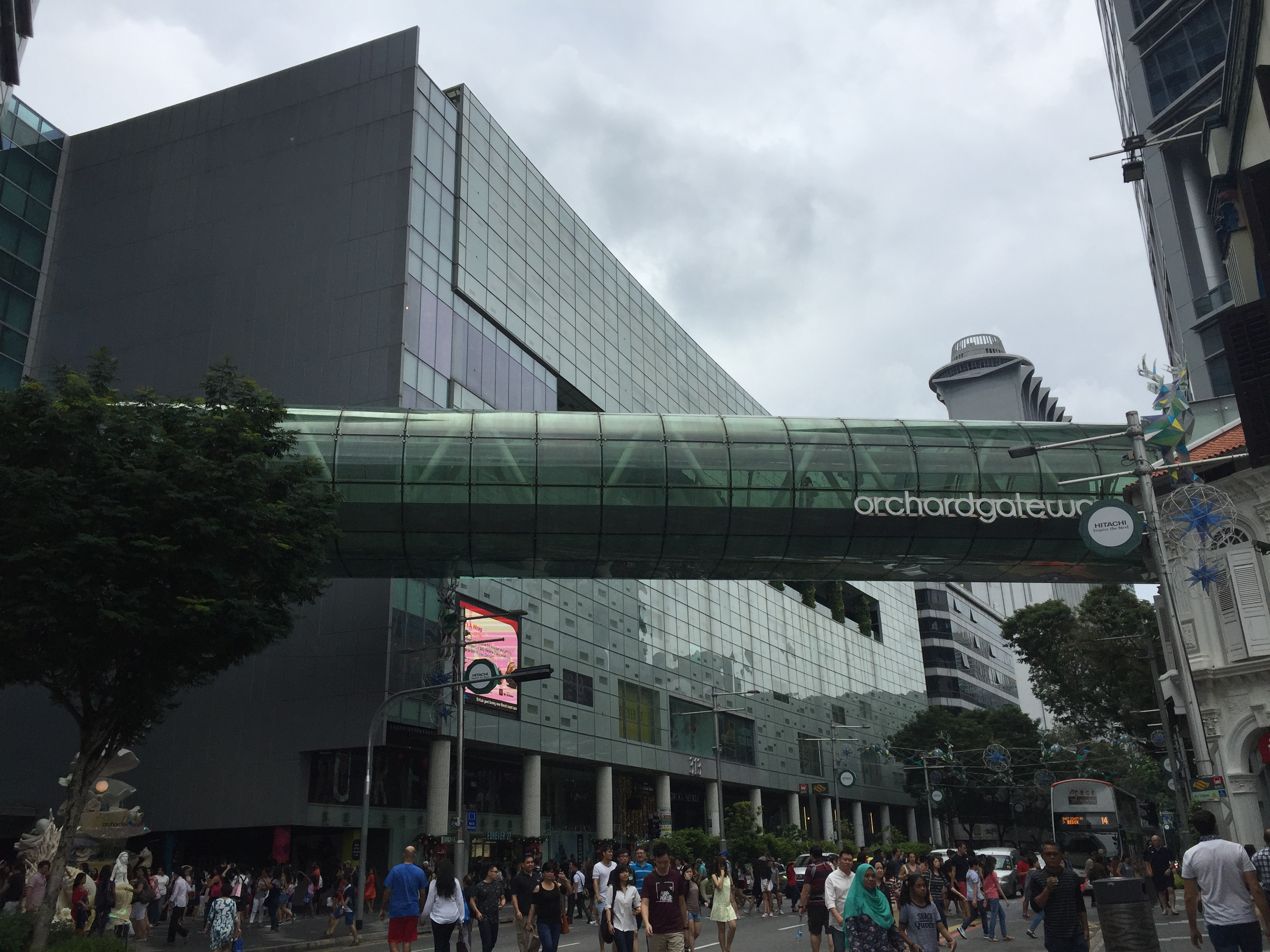
Orchard Gateway, Singapore (2014)

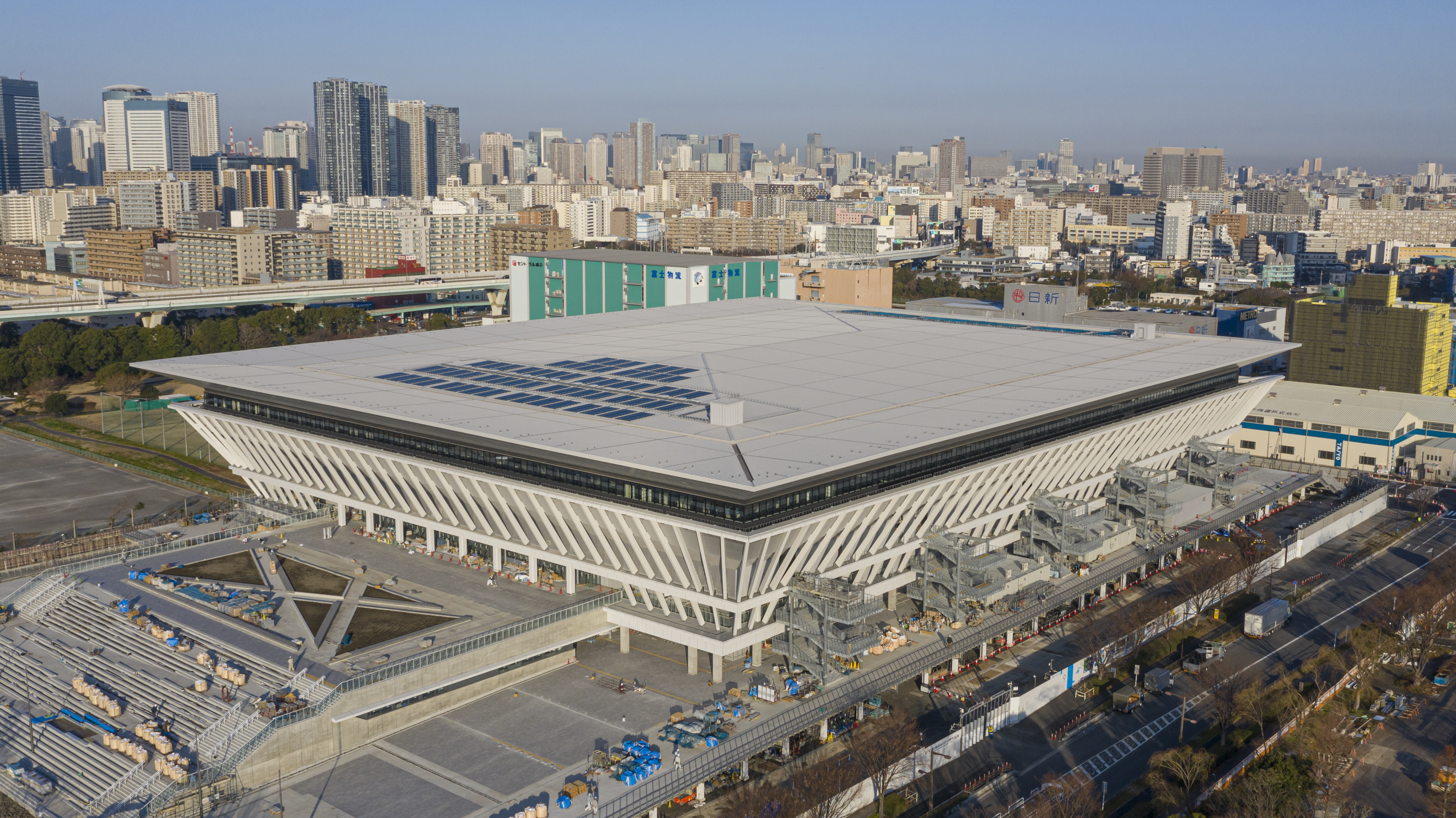
Tokyo Aquatics Centre (2020)
