= Mihara Yasuhiro =

Japanese fashion designer (born 1972)

Mihara Yasuhiro みはら やすひろ
- Born: 1972 (age 53–54); Nagasaki, Japan
- Occupation: Fashion designer
- Website: https://miharayasuhiro.jp/

Mihara Yasuhiro (みはら やすひろ, born June 1972) is a Japanese fashion designer who is the founder and creative director of the avant-garde luxury Japanese fashion house, Maison Mihara Yasuhiro (MMY).

== Biography ==
Mihara was born in June 1972 in Nagasaki, Japan. In 1993, he moved to Tokyo and started collegiate studies in textiles at Tama Art University. He cited John Moore, a shoe designer, and Christopher Nemeth as inspirations.

The next year, Mihara started a self-study of making shoes before launching his first label, archi doom in 1996. By November 1999, he founded the clothing label, SOSU MIHARA YASUHIRO and start presenting at Tokyo Fashion Week.

Mihara spent two years working on a collaboration with Puma, releasing his adapted versions in 2000.

In 2004, his first fashion show outside of Japan took place at Milan Fashion Week, followed by Paris Fashion Week. He continues to showcase his work at Paris Fashion Week, including menswear lines for Fall/Winter 2025-2026 and Spring/Summer 2026.

Mihara is married to internationally renowned jazz pianist Hiromi Uehara. His notable mentees include Masayuki Ino.
