= Chelsea Modern =

Residential building in Manhattan, New York

Coordinates: 40.744514°N 74.005516°W

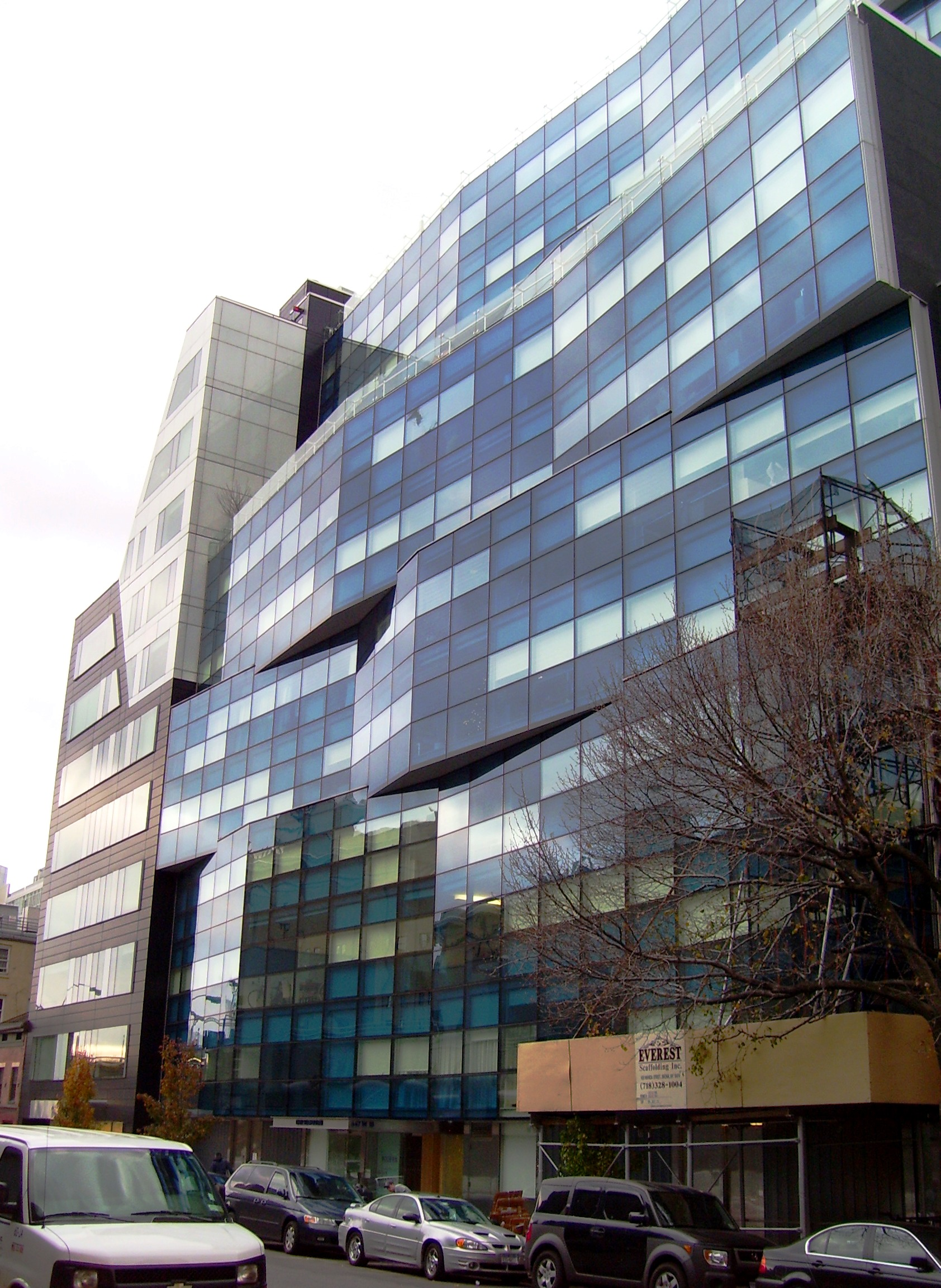
Chelsea Modern in 2010.

Chelsea Modern is a 12-story residential condominium building at 447 West 18th Street in Chelsea, Manhattan, New York City, next to 459 West 18th Street. It was built by Madison Equities in 2009 and designed by Audrey Matlock. It has 47 apartments.

It is notable for its horizontally angled façade that conjures the ripples on the nearby Hudson River, and for its windows that open outwards parallel to the façade and let air in, when open, on all four sides of the window. It also has duplex apartments with gallery spaces partially lit by translucent skylights that are part of the building's sidewalk.
