= Mode Gakuen Cocoon Tower =

Skyscraper located in Tokyo

- モード学園コクーンタワー
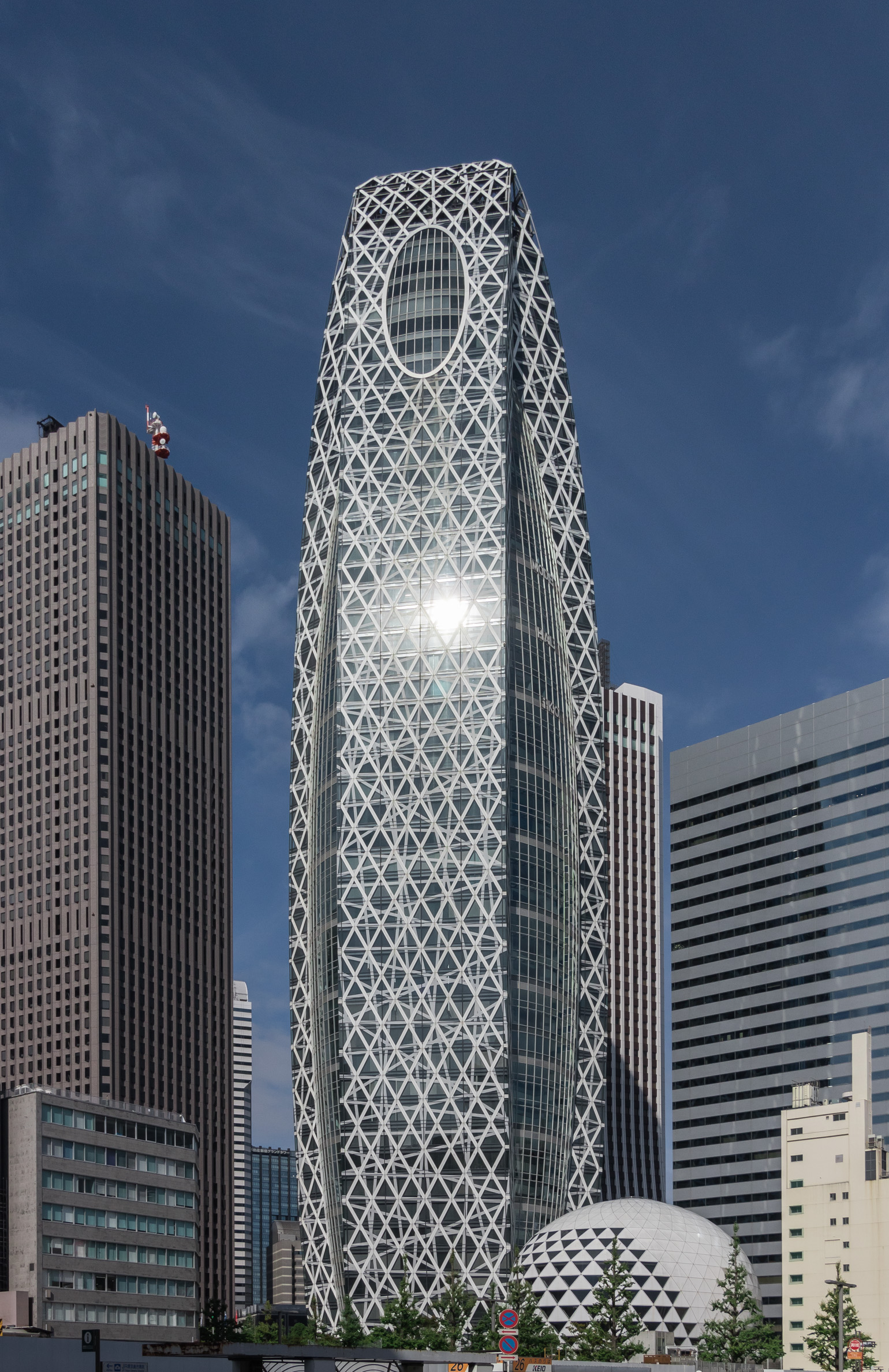
- Interactive map of the Mode Gakuen Cocoon Tower area

General information
- Type: Educational institution
- Architectural style: Structural expressionism
- Location: 1-7-3 Nishi-Shinjuku; Shinjuku, Tokyo, Japan
- Coordinates: 35°41′30″N 139°41′49″E
- Construction started: 2006
- Completed: 2008
- Opening: October 2008

Height
- Roof: 204 meters (669 ft)

Technical details
- Floor count: 50 above ground 3 below ground

Design and construction
- Architect: Tange Associates
- Structural engineer: Arup
- Main contractor: Shimizu Corporation

Mode Gakuen Cocoon Tower (モード学園コクーンタワー, Mōdo gakuen kokūn tawā) is a 204-metre-tall (669-foot), 50-story educational facility located in the Nishi-Shinjuku district in Shinjuku, Tokyo, Japan.

The building was designed by a team led by Paul Noritaka Tange, the son of Kenzo Tange. The building is home to three educational institutions: Tokyo Mode Gakuen (fashion vocational school), HAL Tokyo (special technology and design college), and Shuto Ikō (medical college). Completed in October 2008, the tower is the second-tallest educational building in the world and was the 17th-tallest building in Tokyo. It was awarded the 2008 Skyscraper of the Year by Emporis.

== Design ==
Mode Gakuen invited architects to compete to build its new Tokyo location, stipulating that the building could not be rectangular. About 50 architects submitted more than 150 proposals. The winner had a curved shell of white aluminum and dark blue glass, criss-crossed by a web of white diagonal lines. The architects, Tange Associates, said its cocoon-like shape symbolizes nurturing the students inside; they also said they wanted the building to revitalize the surrounding area and to create a gateway between Shinjuku Station and the Shinjuku central business district. The building earned the firm the Emporis 2008 Skyscraper of the year award.

== Facilities ==
Built on the former site of the now-demolished Asahi Life headquarters, construction of the Mode Gakuen Cocoon Tower began in May 2006 and was completed in October 2008. The 204 metres (669 feet)-tall, 50-story tower is the second-tallest educational building in the world (surpassed only by the main building of the Moscow State University) and was the 17th-tallest building in Tokyo. The vertical campus can accommodate 10,000 students for the three vocational schools that occupy the building. Tokyo Mode Gakuen, for which the building in named after, is a fashion school. The other schools, HAL Tokyo and Shuto Ikō, are information technology and medical schools, respectively, that are operated by Mode Gakuen University. Each floor of the tower contains three rectangular classrooms that surround an inner core. The inner core consists of an elevator, a staircase and a support shaft. Every three floors, a three-story student lounge is located between the classrooms and faces three directions: east, southwest and northwest.

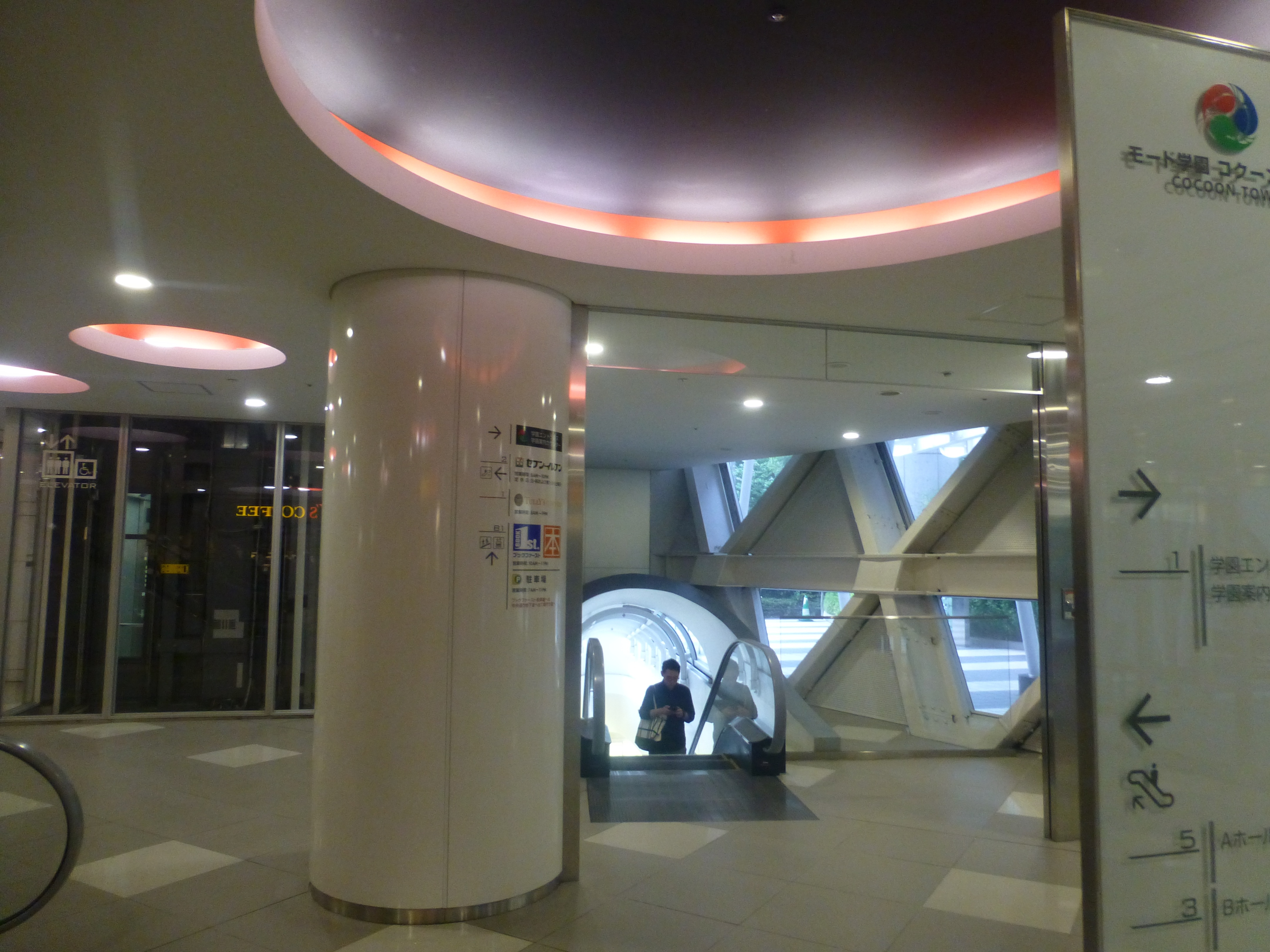
Inside the tower, 2016

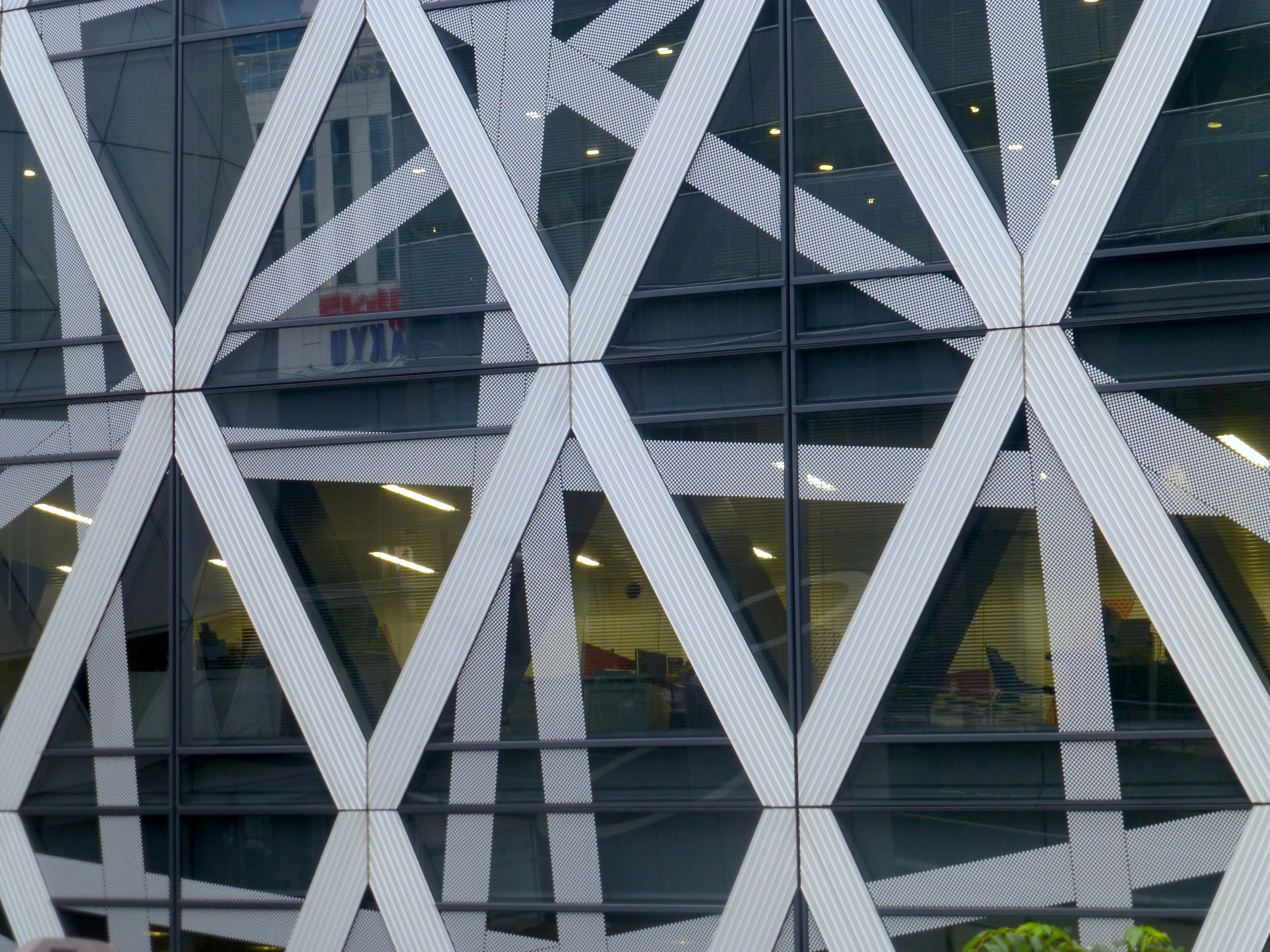
Detail of the façade, 2016

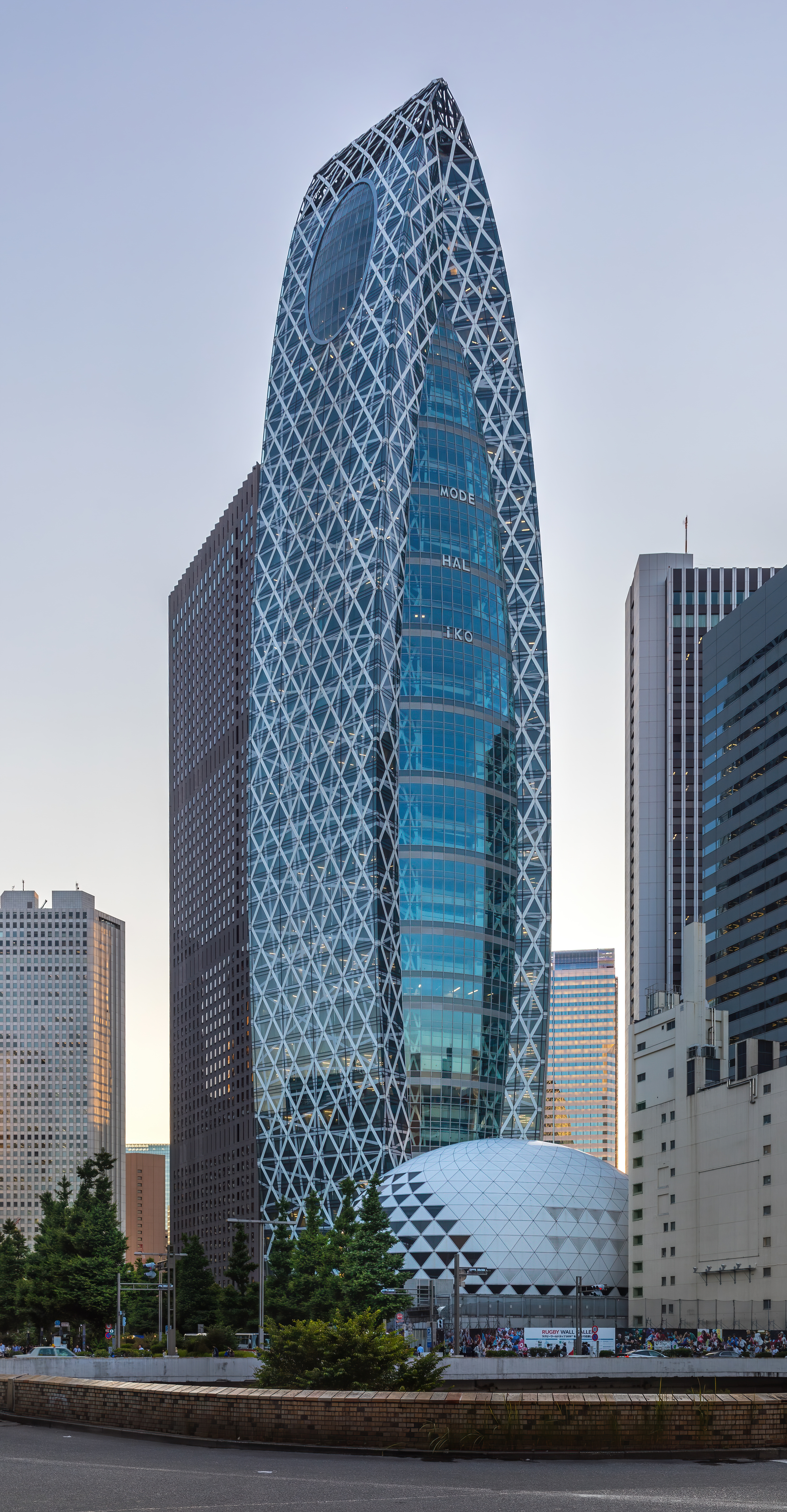
The tower in the evening, 2019

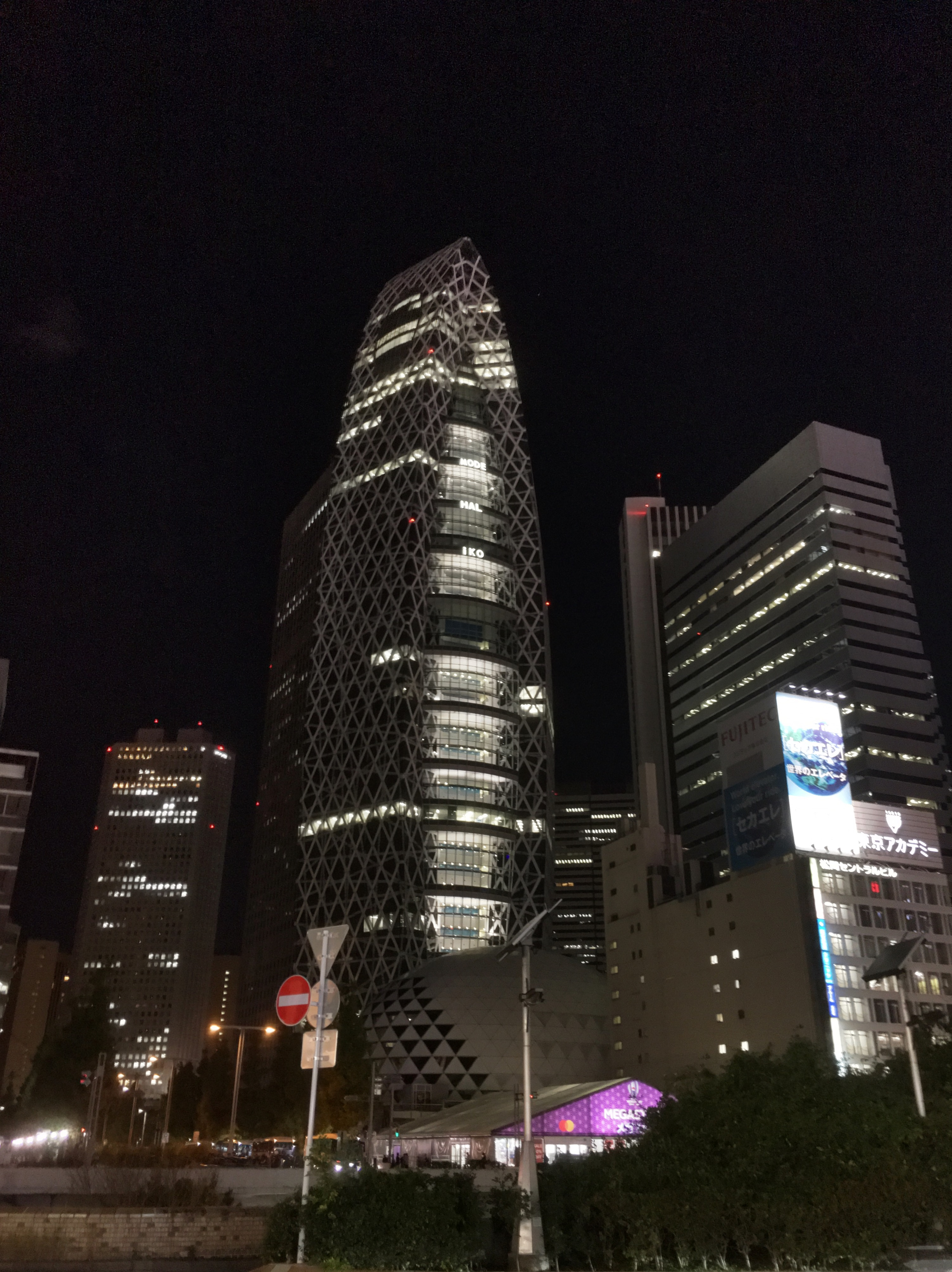
The tower at night, 2019

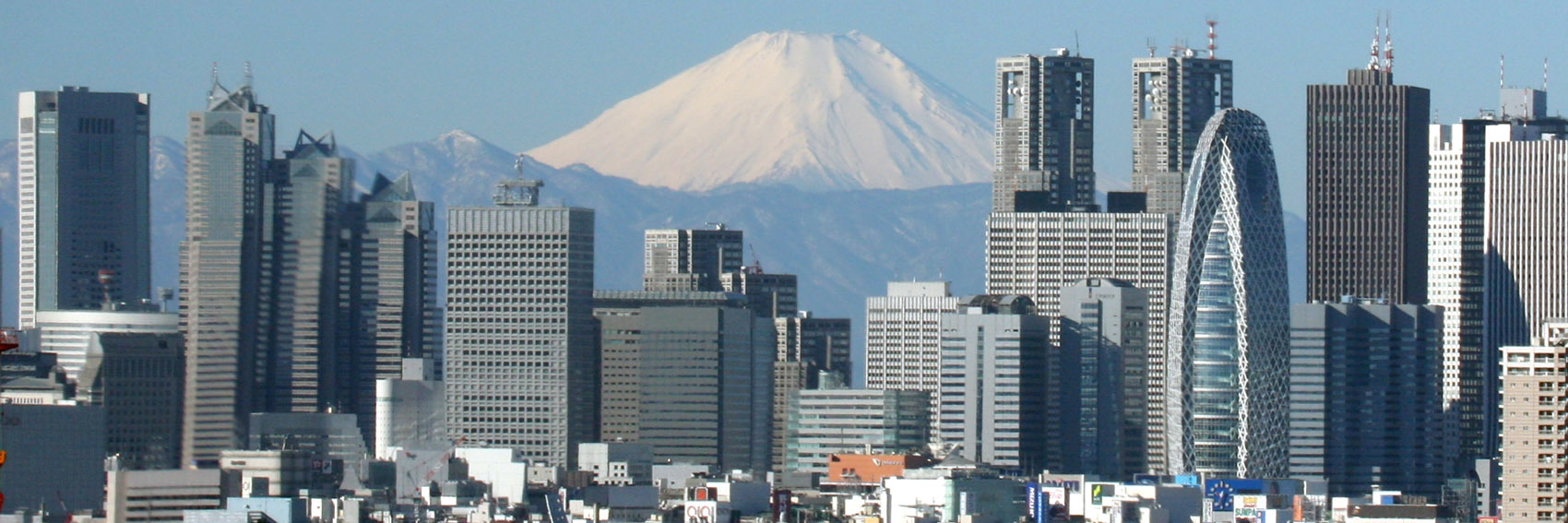
In the 2009 skyline

== Notable graduates ==
=== Tokyo Mode Gakuen ===
Masayuki Ino

== See also ==
- Mode Gakuen Spiral Towers
- 30 St Mary Axe
