= The Grey House, Highgate =

21st-century house in Highgate, London, England

The Grey House
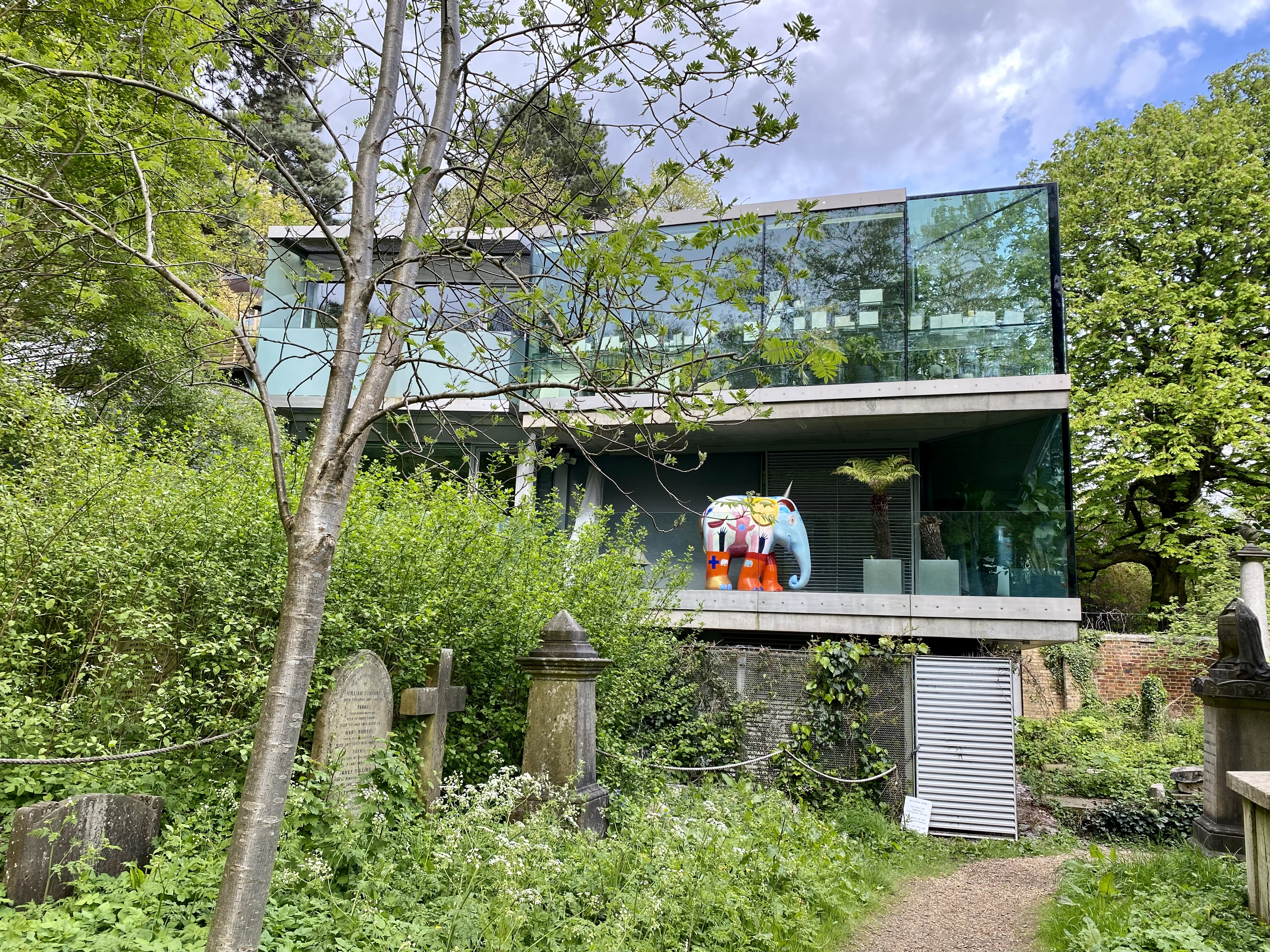
- The Grey House from Highgate Cemetery in 2024
- Interactive map of the The Grey House area

General information
- Location: 85 Swains Lane, Highgate, London, England
- Year built: 2008

Technical details
- Floor area: 4,162 square feet (386.7 m^{2})

Design and construction
- Architecture firm: Eldridge Smerin

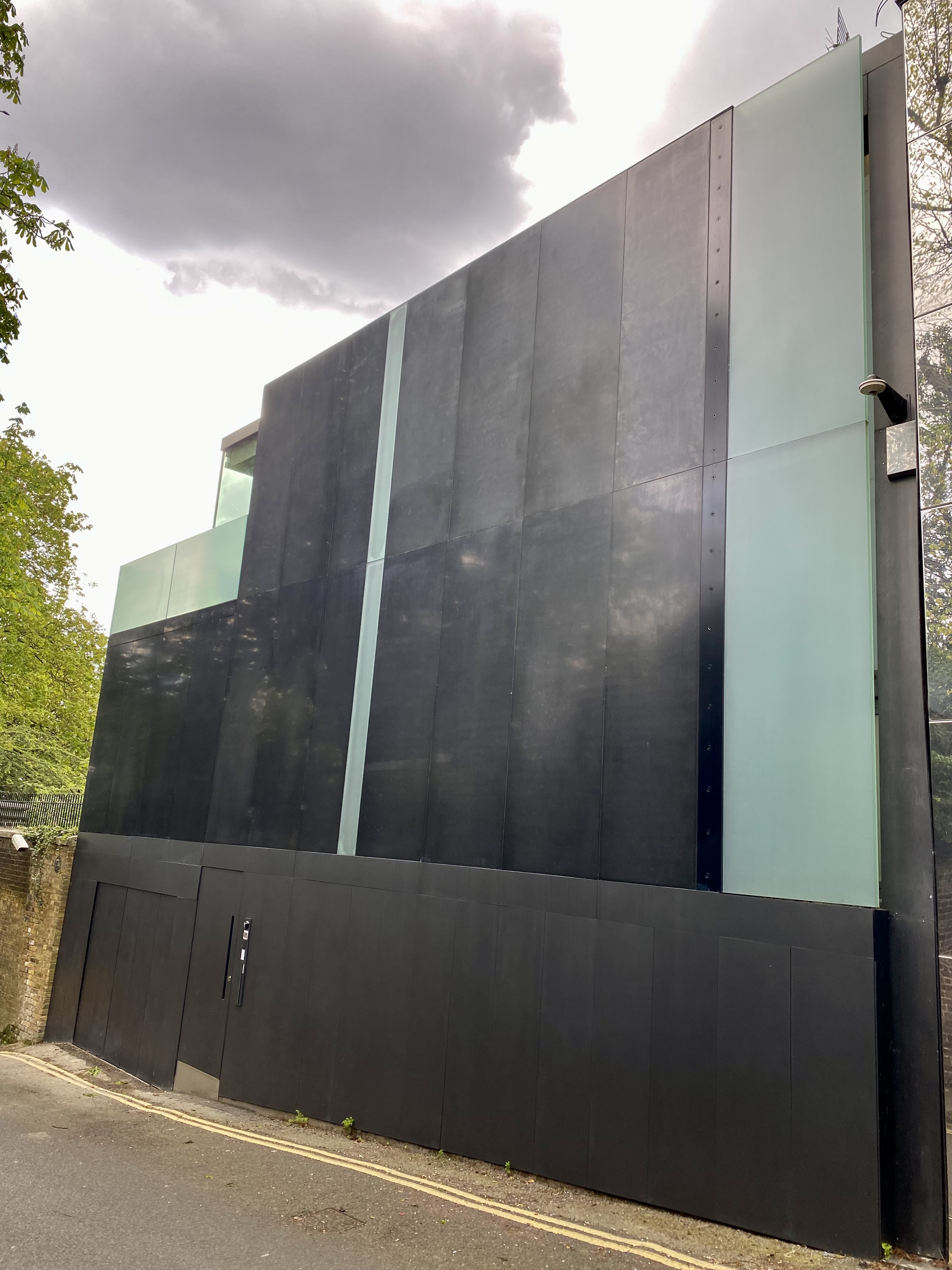
The house from Swain's Lane in 2024

The Grey House at 85 Swains Lane in Highgate in north London, is a house built in 2008 by the architectural firm Eldridge Smerin.

The house was one of the 97 recipients of the RIBA Award in 2009 and was shortlisted for RIBA's London Building of the Year award.

== Location ==
The house overlooks the West Side of Highgate Cemetery. Swains Lane used to form one of the four main routes up Highgate Hill, and there were houses on the site prior to the establishment of the cemetery; in 1609 a William Gwercie left one cottage, a garden and half an acre in his Will, having himself inherited them in 1591. In 1657 the physician, Elisha Coysh, lived in another. His property and half an acre of land can be traced on through Will records to Anna Sirdefield who died in 1882. By then there were six cottages on the site, and when she died the London Cemetery Company bought all six, and the land with them. The cemetery itself had been established in 1839.

In the late 1960s, financial precariousness of the cemetery led to the sale of several plots of land around the perimeter, including the Swains Lane site, where three modern houses were built. The plot now occupied by No. 85 was the last: it had been purchased by the architect John Winter, and he built a house there in 1981. Winter's 1981 house had a nautical appearance with blue cladding with white steel framing and large porthole windows. It was described as a "quirky box of tricks" by Building Design magazine. The house was heavily cantilevered, and unfortunately the cantilever gradually failed, partly because insufficient rebar had been used, leaving the house part-resting on the cemetery wall. The house was sold in 1998 to Richard Elliott, a photographer, chartered surveyor and developer. He lived in the 1981 house for seven years, but it was structurally failing and he eventually decided to demolish and replace it. He subsequently commissioned a new house from Eldridge Smerin having been inspired by another house in Highgate the firm had built, The Lawns, completed in 2001. The new house was completed in 2008. He felt that living in the house was like living in an "enchanted forest". He lived in the house for several years before selling.

The house appeared in multiple episodes in the fifth season of the BBC drama series Luther.

The Friends of Highgate Cemetery and The Highgate Society initially opposed the construction of the house. The objections were disregarded by Camden London Borough Council as they felt that the design "illustrates an inherently sensitive grasp of the site's context ... unique and responsive, but suitably neutral" and that "small intervention is not so significant" due to the large size and greenery of the cemetery.

== Description ==
The house has four bedrooms and four bathrooms, with three reception rooms. The basement has a home theatre and industrial equipment for the automated lighting and blinds of the house. Each bedroom has a balcony. The kitchen is situated on the top floor and has a retractable glass roof. It is 4,162 square feet (386.7 m^{2}) in size. The exterior facing Swains Lane features steel panels and black granite. The house has open-plan living areas and the south and west facades of the house are distinguished by a curtain wall of glass.

Ian Dungavell (Chief Executive of Highgate Cemetery) called it a "remarkable building, robustly finished ... and filled with light" with the glass "making you feel like you're standing in the Cemetery itself". Writing in The Guardian, Ros Anderson said that "the glass reflects tree trunks and leaves, giving it a fluid, almost ethereal, feel" but that the view from the house was "the real attraction. ... everything focuses your attention outwards".

The prominent use of glass in the Grey House followed the precedent set by John Winter's own modernist residence by the cemetery gate, 81 Swains Lane. Upon completion of the Grey House in 2008, Winter described it as "near to being a faultless building as I have seen for a long time" and that he was " ... lost in admiration for the excellence of the building work and the thorough rigour of the design". Writing in the newsletter of Highgate Cemetery, Ian Dungavell described the house as "a strikingly modern intervention in a landscape of crumbling monuments and overgrown trees". One former owner said of the house; "it's a very simple design inside - big open spaces and high ceilings. The living space is on the top floor and is up in the trees, so living there is to be surrounded by green. It's incredibly quiet, all you hear is birdsong. The regular avian visitors are magpies, crows and a robin. Occasionally there are jay, woodpecker and redwing and once, incredibly, a goshawk resting on the trees outside the top bedroom window. And at night, sometimes (rarely) a tawny owl comes to sit on the tall gravestone outside the living room. It has more soul than any other house I've ever lived in."
