= 459 West 18th Street =

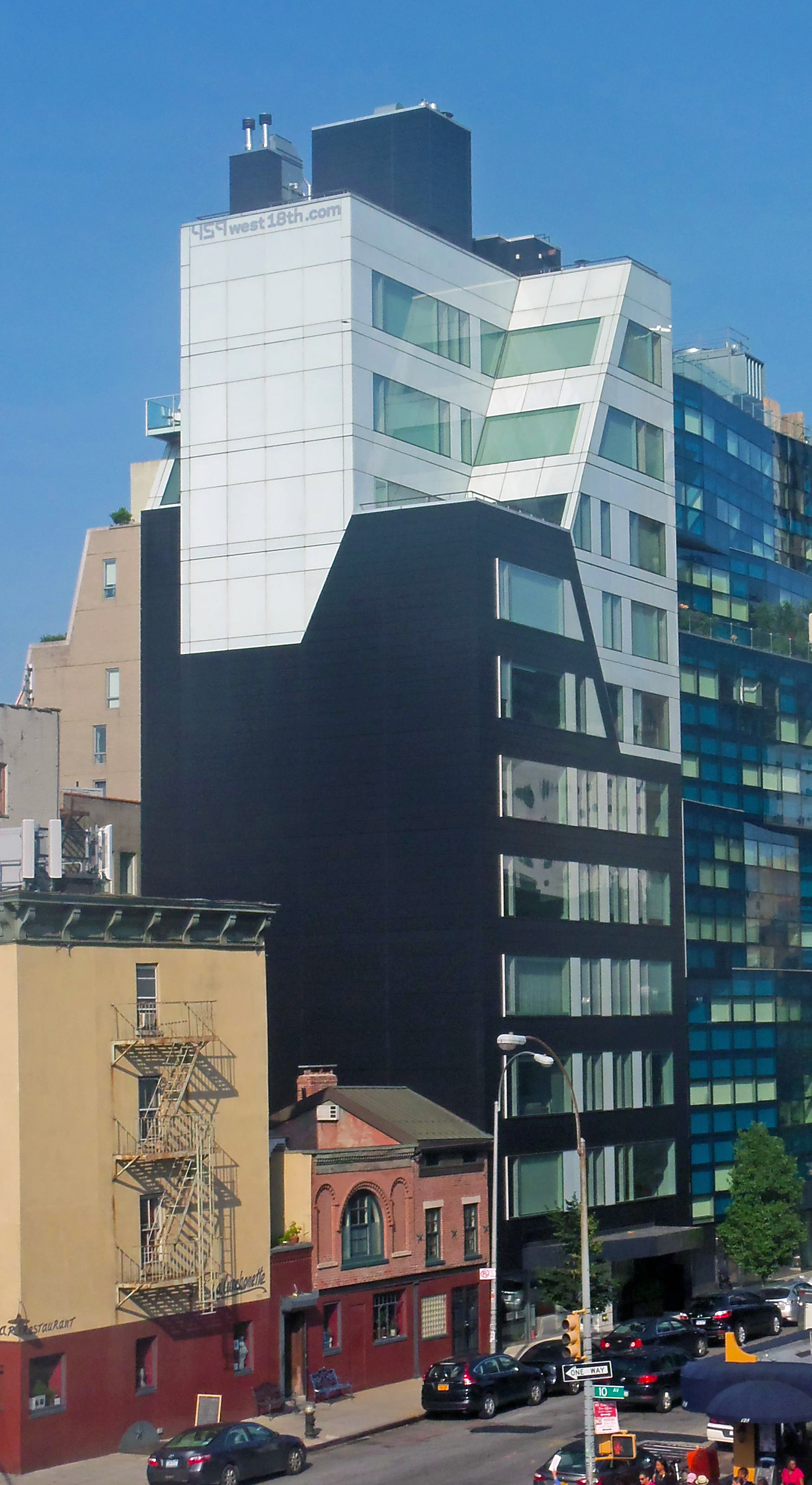
- West profile and south elevation from the High Line, 2013

- Location within Manhattan Location within New York City
- Etymology: Address

General information
- Type: Mixed-use high-rise
- Location: 457–459 West 18th Street, Chelsea, Manhattan, New York City, NY, United States
- Coordinates: 40°44′40.5″N 74°0′21″W
- Elevation: 10 feet (3.0 m)
- Completed: 2008

Height
- Architectural: 120 feet (37 m)

Technical details
- Structural system: Steel frame
- Material: Steel, aluminum, glass, concrete, composite.
- Floor count: 11
- Floor area: 29,700 square feet (2,760 m^{2})
- Grounds: 31,000 square feet (2,900 m^{2})

Design and construction
- Architecture firm: Della Valle + Bernheimer
- Developer: Alloy Development, LLC
- Main contractor: T.G. Nickel
- Awards: 2009 Annual Design Review Award for Multi-Family Housing, Architect

Other information
- Number of units: 10

Website
- 459west18th.com

459 West 18th Street is a mid-rise condominium located at that address in the West Chelsea neighborhood of the New York City borough of Manhattan. It is an 11-story building with retail space on its ground floor and 10 residential units, one on each floor, for a total of 29,700 square feet (2,760 m^{2}). Della Valle + Bernheimer of Brooklyn was the architect.

To ensure that its design was built as intended, the architects developed the property themselves, which also saved time and money on construction, important during the 2008 financial crisis, through Alloy Development, a subsidiary. They chose to have it sheathed in black composite and white glass, delineated by an irregularly shaped boundary on the building's upper stories meant to call attention to complex local zoning requirements. After it was finished in 2008, the building was quickly occupied as buyers, including CNBC anchor Simon Hobbs, were drawn by the nearby presence of the newly opened High Line. The year afterward it earned Architect magazine's Annual Design Review Award for Multi-Family Housing.

== Building ==
The building is located on a 31,000-square-foot (2,900 m^{2}) L-shaped lot on the north side of West 18th Street, a short distance east of the intersection with 10th Avenue, in the West Chelsea neighborhood. All the nearby blocks are characterized by dense urban development with multistory mixed-use buildings. The terrain is generally sloping up very gradually to the east from the Hudson River 600 feet (180 m) to the west.

Most of the buildings in the area are of late 19th or 20th-century construction, such as the two adjoining 459 to its west, and the commercial building across the street. There are, however, some other 21st-century buildings by notable architects in the neighborhood. On the immediate east is the 2009 Chelsea Modern by Audrey Matlock. Frank Gehry's 2007 IAC Building is located a block to the west at the 11th Avenue intersection, with Jean Nouvel's 100 Eleventh Avenue just to its north on the corner with 19th Street. Between it and 459 the High Line elevated linear park crosses 18th Street.

The building itself is a 120-foot (37 m) steel frame high-rise with concrete plank floors. Its 11 stories are faced in sheets of composite and opaque glass over aluminum panels. At street level the main entrance has a small roof covering ingress to its lobby and the retail space there. Its lower five stories occupy its full footprint. The facing on them is black composite, with fenestration consisting of tall strip windows, some 8 by 18 feet (2.4 by 5.5 m), with two-inch (5.1 cm) mullions concealing the venting, on the south face.

At the sixth floor the glass on the eastern side is white, with a diagonal divide between it and the black panels continuing to the next story where it ends at a small roof taking up the building's southwest corner. Above it the remaining three stories are all white, with the space above the roof opening up at a matching angle. On the roof the top of the elevator shaft and the hardware are all black.

Inside, the ground-floor space is currently occupied by an art gallery. The stories above are given over to one residential unit each from 1,451 to 1,693 square feet (134.8 to 157.3 m^{2}), with wide wood plank flooring and marble slabs. All have custom-designed Italian kitchens and bathrooms, along with the large windows.

== History ==
Jared Della Valle, one of the principals of Della Valle + Bernheimer, a small architectural firm based in the Brooklyn neighborhood of Dumbo, bought the property in 2006 along with one of his firm's clients, Katherine McConvey, for $5 million. Two years later, they were able to secure $19 million in financing from United Commercial Bank (UCB). The two planned to develop it from the start, and formed a company, Alloy Development LLC, in order to do so.

The project faced some unusual constraints. Its lot was L-shaped, 100 feet (30 m) deep on the east side but only 50 feet (15 m) on the west. In addition the neighborhood was subject to special zoning restrictions.

There were also economic constraints related to the 2008 financial crisis. UCB failed in 2009. Two of the apartment buyers reneged on their original agreements to purchase, although the ultimate outcome was beneficial to the developer.

The builders were able to adapt to those limitations. As both architect and developer, Della Valle was able to amend the design in ways that both made it cheaper to build but preserved the original design concept. The New York Times later reported that this shortened construction by four or five months.

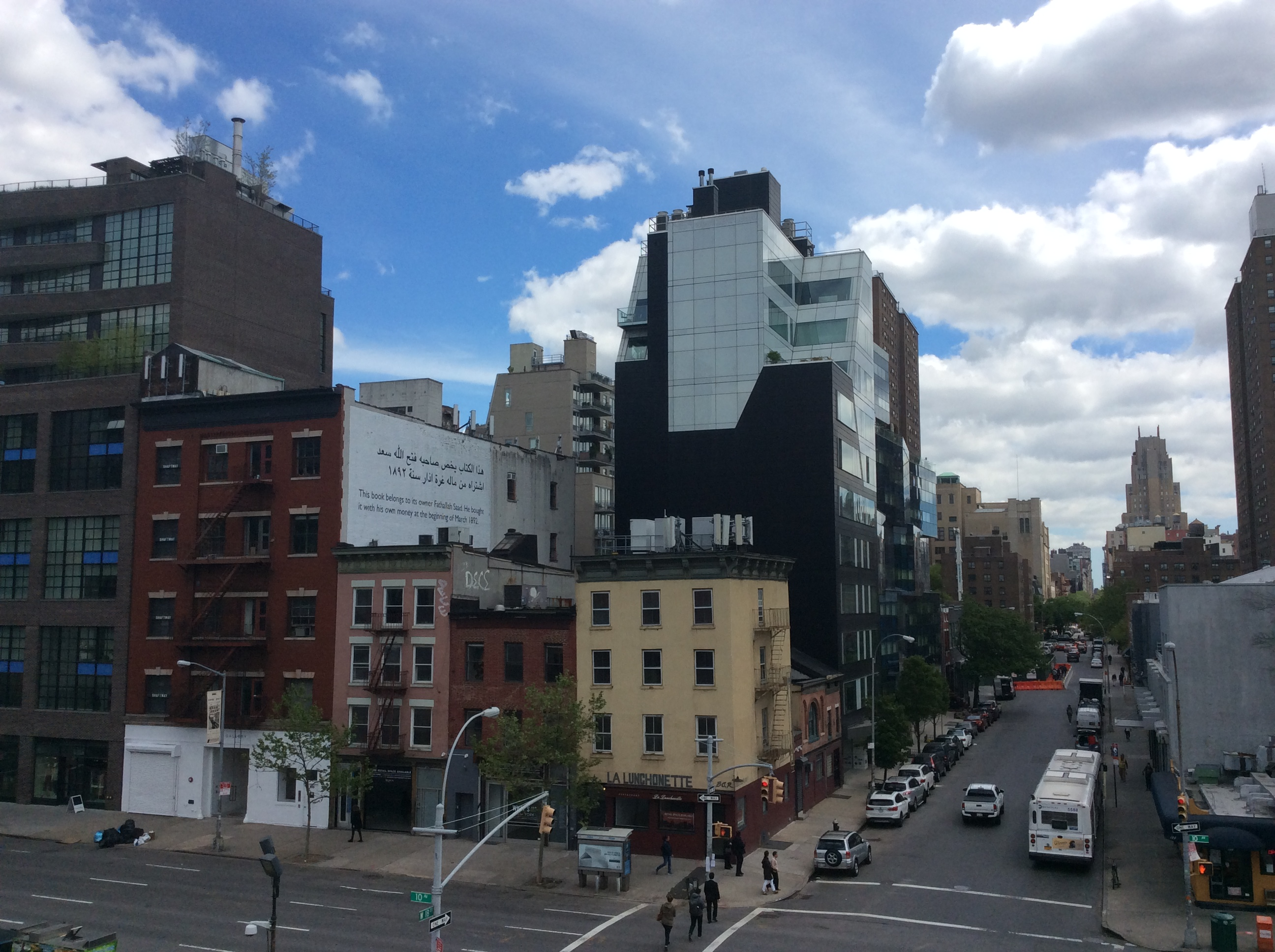
Seen in 2017

Construction itself was made as cost-effective as possible to further assuage the concerns of lenders in a difficult economy, using the CM at-risk model. Most parts were prefabricated. The building's windows were produced in China, then set in the facade panels by a company in Calverton, on Long Island, and then shipped to the site on flatbed trucks. According to Della Valle, one had merely 1 1/2 inches (3.8 cm) of overhead clearance when it crossed the Manhattan Bridge, leading the fabricators to say they would never build such large panels again. They were fully applied in two weeks.

When construction finished in 2008, at a final cost of $12 million, the builders were able to offer competitively priced residential units for the upscale neighborhood that was expected to sprout up around the High Line, set to open in the next year. They knew Nouvel's building nearby, a strong draw for the same buyers, would soon be completed as well. "Our goal was to deliver a true three-bedroom, and we aimed to cost $50 per square foot less than everybody else on the block," Della Valle told the Times in 2009, at which point they had sold seven of the apartments.

He believed they had met that expectation. Within the first year, all the apartments had sold in the range of $2.5–3.8 million. Among the early occupants was CNBC anchor Simon Hobbs, who moved into a two-bedroom unit in 2010. Five years later he in turn sold it to Bristol-Myers Squibb chief executive officer Giovanni Caforio for $3.9 million.

== Aesthetic ==
"On an experiential level," Della Valle + Bernheimer writes on its website, "the design intention was to construct a solid building that would give occupants a panoramic connection to the city." They wanted to avoid building another one of the many colorless and featureless "glass boxes" that had sprung up around New York in the early 21st century. In their first studies, they considered the idea of architecture from opposites, which ultimately led to using black and white laid in the shape of the "idealized zoning diagram" for the property, expressing the building's presence between Chelsea and the Meatpacking District.

"While many new buildings express visual connectivity to the city through ubiquitous expanses of transparent surfaces," the architects continue, pointing to the neighboring Chelsea Modern as an example, "our design posits that a solid, totemic object can be equally revealing." To that end the surfaces and windows are as minimalist as possible, with most outer hardware hidden and the large windows surrounded by only a small metallic sill and lintel. Jerry Della Valle told The New York Times that this allowed them to offer buyers a hundred feet (30 m) of windows in each unit, far more than they might get in a comparably priced TriBeCa apartment. His firm's website elaborates on this idea, stating that "the window becomes a minimal yet severe vitrine that is mostly invisible but forces spatial containment." The building overall "is thus articulated as a pair of linked or nested dualities: solid and void, black and white."

== Reception ==
The architectural community took note of the building. Even as it was being built, New York magazine included it in a guide to the emerging West Chelsea skyline. Four years later it was included in the Guide to Contemporary New York City Architecture. Despite the considerable difference in aesthetic between it and the neighboring Chelsea Modern, it notes, "their shouts for attention link them as much as the property line they share."

Architect, the magazine of the American Institute of Architects, gave the building one of its 2009 Annual Design Review Awards for Multi-Family Housing. According to the magazine, its jury referred to the two-tone design on the facade as "jacket and pants." It felt the building worked well both as an individual building and as a component of the neighborhood. “In that area, you have old, low buildings and new, high buildings, so it really reflects that contrast,” it quoted one juror as saying.

== See also ==
- Architecture of New York City
- List of residential condominiums in New York City
