= Eldridge Smerin =

British architectural firm

Eldridge Smerin is an architectural firm based in London. It was formed in 1998, by Nick Eldridge and Piers Smerin.

Eldridge Smerin's first completed project was the Lawns, a house in the Highgate Conservation area. It was nominated for the 2001 Stirling Prize. Subsequent projects include the Design Council Offices and a The Grey House, a house on Swain's Lane in Highgate Cemetery, nominated for the 2009 Manser Medal and Stephen Lawrence Prize.

Eldridge Smerin also won the 2009 Building Design One-off House Architect of the Year award.
