= Palazzo Bollani Erizzo =

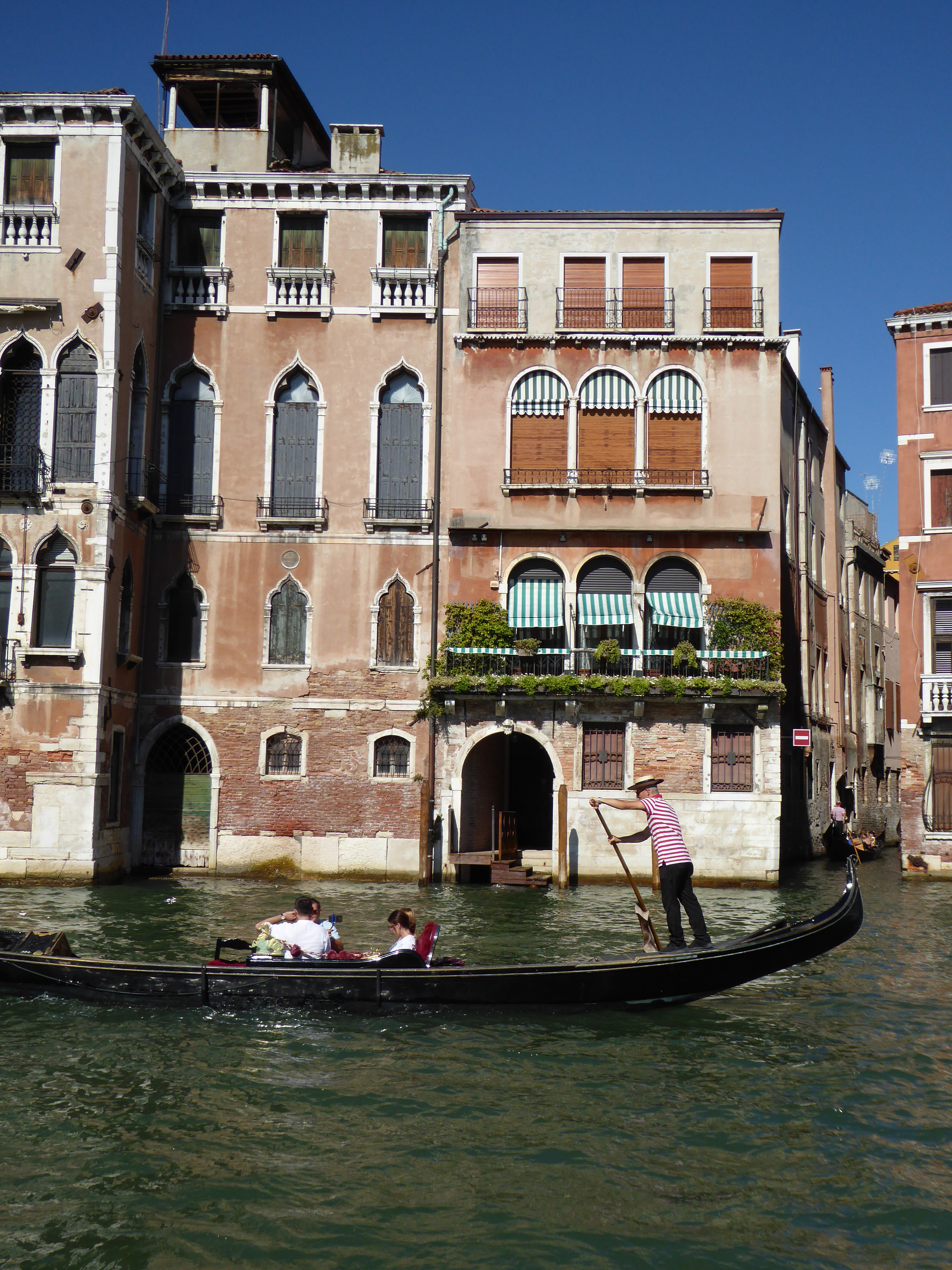
- Palazzo Bollani Erizzo, the right of three structures.
- Interactive map of the Palazzo Bollani Erizzo area

General information
- Type: Residential
- Architectural style: Venetian-Byzantine
- Location: Cannaregio district, Venice, Italy
- Coordinates: 45°26′22.51″N 12°20′10.51″E
- Construction started: 13th century

Technical details
- Floor count: 4 levels

Palazzo Bolani Erizzo is an ancient Venetian palace of the 13th century, built along the Grand Canal in the Cannaregio district. It stands wall to wall with Palazzo Dolfin.

== History ==
The palazzo was the ancient residence of the poet Pietro Aretino in the 16th century, and in the early 19th century the palace was bought by the Levi family. After the World War One, the engineer Gino Vittorio Ravà, a builder, resided there, who built the Scalzi bridge in Venice and invented the restoration system using the hydraulic jack method. During the World War Two, the palazzo was rented for a short time by poet Filippo Tommaso Marinetti who in 1944 founded the futurist association Cannaregio 5662.

== Architecture ==
The current palace is the result of the renovation of an older building that has been raised in more recent times. The narrow façade has the two noble floors, with each one featuring a three-part mullioned window with large arches on columns. The ground floor has an arched portal moved to the left position, which is adjoined by two small rectangular windows on the right. All arched openings and the lower part of the ground floor feature Istrian stone details. On the top floor there are four rectangular windows with a frontal balcony. While the two middle ones share a balcony with iron railings, the two lateral windows each have an own balcony.

== Panorama from the palazzo ==
According to E. Fahy, an oil painting by Francesco Guardi, representing the Grand Canal and Rialto bridge, shows the Venetian panorama as it was possible to observe from a window located on the first floor of the palazzo.
