= Francesco da Mosto =

Italian architect, historian and author

- Born: June 6, 1961 (age 65); Venice, Italy
- Occupations: Author, historian, architect
- Writing career
- Genres: History, culture, food, architecture

Francesco da Mosto (Italian pronunciation: [franˈtʃesko da (m)ˈmosto]; born 1961) is an Italian architect, author, historian, film maker and television presenter. He presented the three BBC 2 series Francesco's Venice (2004) and Francesco's Italy: Top to Toe (2006) where he explored the country in an Alfa Romeo Spider and Francesco's Mediterranean Voyage (filmed 2007, broadcast 2008) which sees him sailing aboard the Camper and Nicholsons ketch Black Swan from his home city, Venice, to Istanbul, visiting places including Split, Mostar and Dubrovnik. He presented the two part BBC 2 series: Shakespeare in Italy, (2012).

== Biography ==
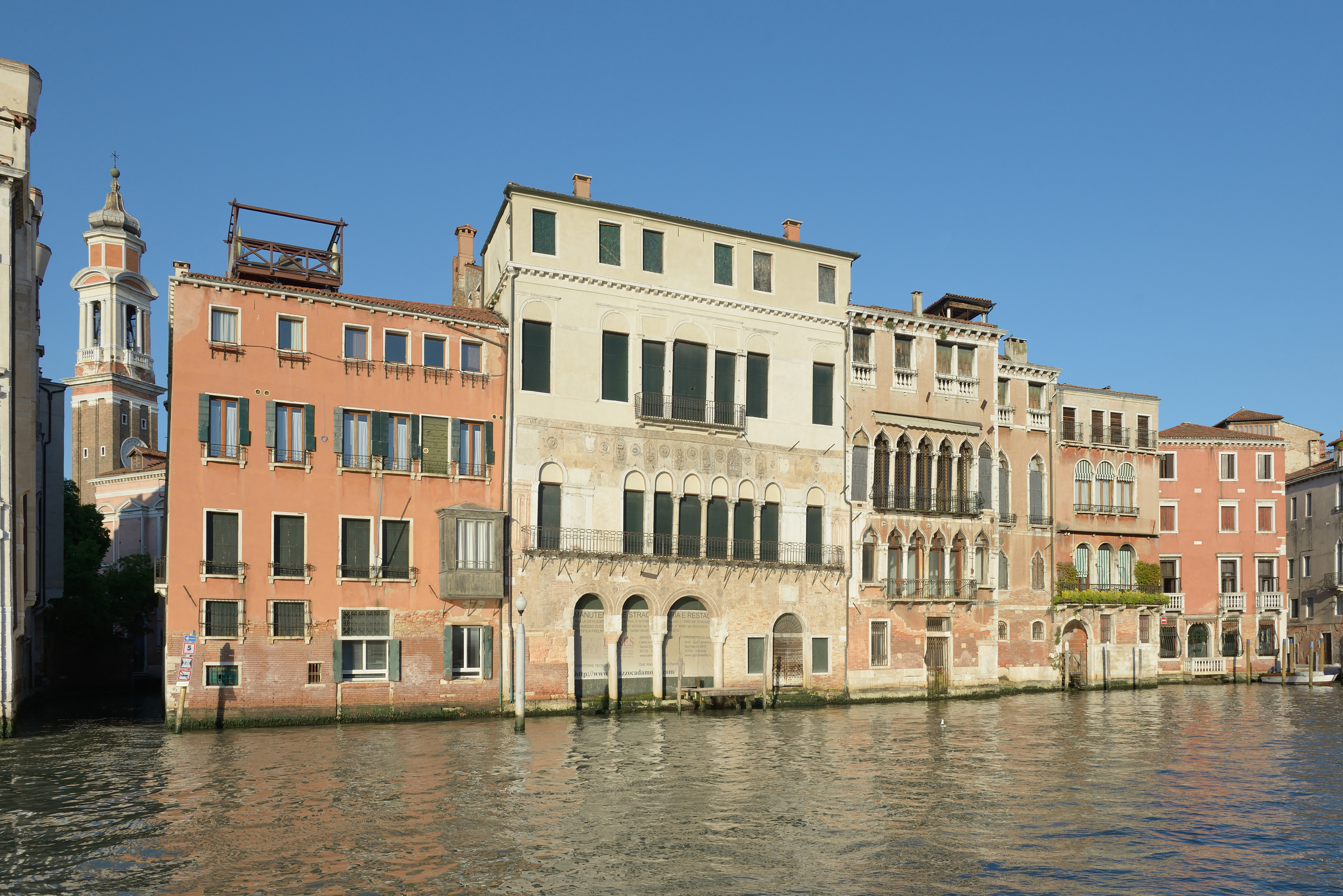
Ca' da Mosto

Da Mosto was born into an aristocratic family in Venice, and his family has been part of the city's history for several centuries. Originally, they were wine makers – the name da Mosto coming from the word mosto meaning grape must (juice from crushed grapes). Later, the family became traders, explorers and politicians.

The family's previous Venice residence, the Ca' da Mosto, which can be seen from the Rialto market by the Grand Canal, was lost through marriage in the 17th century, when Chiara da Mosto, a female member of the family, married four times, with each husband dying of natural causes – thus enabling her to become one of the wealthiest people in Venice.

Unfortunately for the da Mosto family, the childless widow had a falling-out with them and on her death in 1603 she left everything to Leonardo Donà dalle Rose, a nephew of her second husband, who went on to become Doge.

Da Mosto is the younger son of Count Ranieri da Mosto and Contessa Maria Grazia Vanni d'Archirafi, who comes from a very old Sicilian noble family who are the Dukes of Archirafi and include many noted Italian diplomats and bankers. A Roman Catholic, da Mosto took his first Holy Communion in the crypt of St Mark's. A few years later, he received the sacrament of Confirmation from the future Pope John Paul I.

Da Mosto lives in his family home in Venice, with his South African-born wife Jane, his four children including successful footballer Cosimo Da Mosto, and his parents. In 1919 Francesco's grandfather Andrea acquired the palazzo where the family now live. When he moved in, the empty picture frames on the walls of the portego were filled with copies of family pictures, including a 15th-century map of the voyages of Alvise da Mosto, who discovered the Cape Verde islands off the west coast of Africa.

When BBC Two decided to make a four-part series about the history of Venice, they contacted Francesco to be the host. He has now presented three series for BBC Two: Francesco's Venice, Francesco's Italy – from Top to Toe and Francesco's Mediterranean Voyage, with accompanying books to the series. He has also published a book entitled Francesco's Kitchen.

In the Doctor Who Confidential series 5 episode Death in Venice, Francesco is featured explaining the history of Venice to Matt Smith.

Shakespeare in Italy was broadcast on BBC Two on May 3 and 10, 2012.

In 2015, da Mosto co-presented the documentary A Sicilian Dream about the Targa Florio, a Sicilian motor race.

== Bibliography ==
- Francesco's Italy: Top to Toe. BBC Books. June 8, 2006. ISBN 978-0-563-49348-8.
- Francesco's Venice. BBC Books. February 8, 2007. ISBN 978-0-563-49363-1.
- Francesco's Kitchen. Ebury Press. October 4, 2007. ISBN 978-0-09-192228-3.
- Francesco's Mediterranean Voyage. BBC Books. May 1, 2008. ISBN 978-1-84607-340-3.

== Francesco's Italy: Top to Toe ==
Da Mosto's series Francesco's Italy: Top to Toe, broadcast on BBC Two, shows his journey from his home city of Venice to his mother's origins in Sicily. This series has four episodes: "The Romantic North", "The Garden of Italy", "The Heart of Italy", and "The Land of My Mother".

In the first episode, he visits the Romeo and Juliet balcony in Verona, and the city of Milan. During episode two, he visits Lucca and Florence. During episode 3, he visits Rome and Naples. In the final episode, he visits Sicily, where there is an emotional reunion with his family.
