= Tokyo Fashion Week =

Major fashion industry trade show in Tokyo, Japan

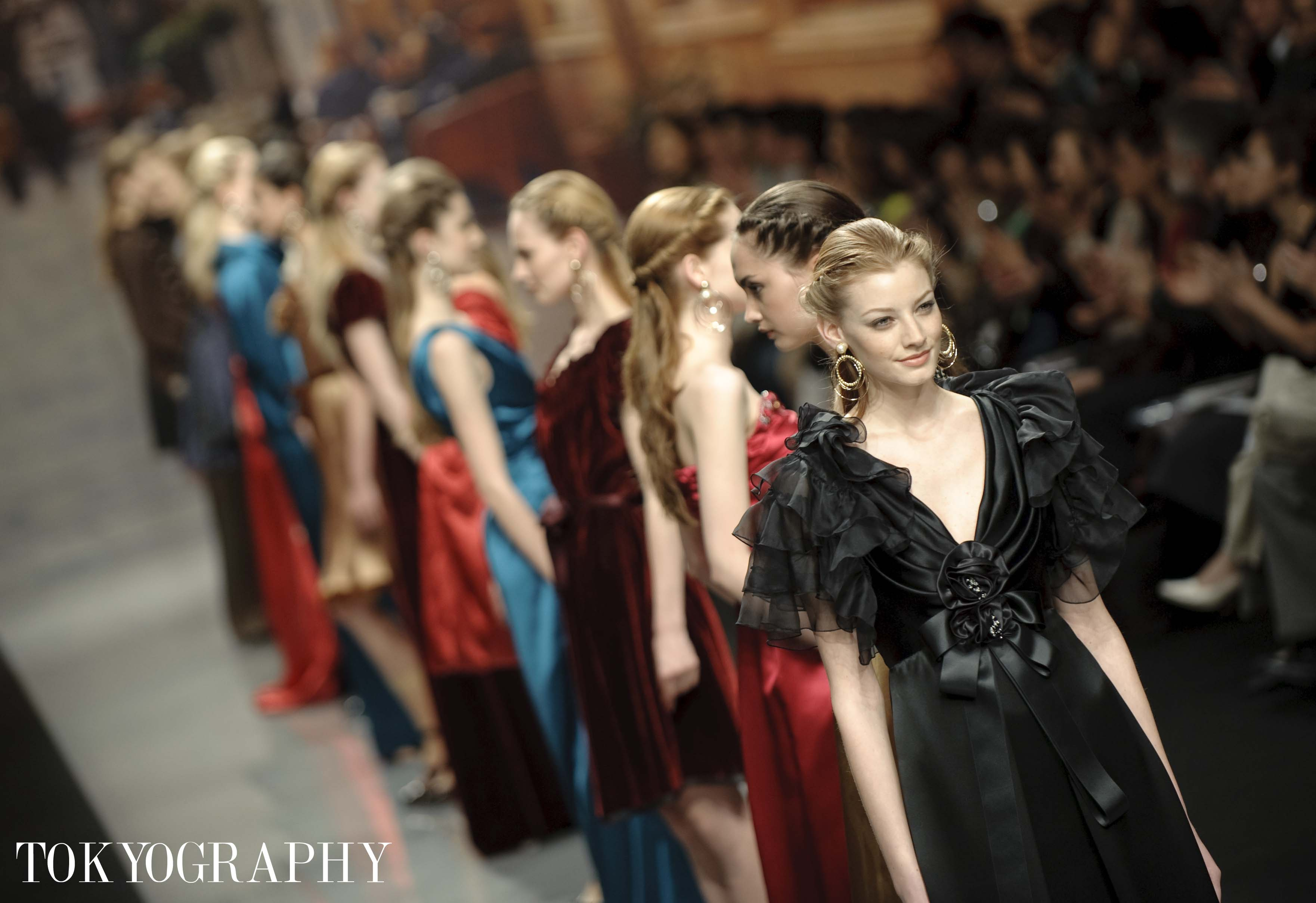
Tokyo Fashion Week in 2010

Tokyo Fashion Week (Japanese: 東京コレクション, also known as Tokyo Collection) is a fashion trade show held bi-annually in Tokyo, Japan. It is held twice a year with luxury, ready-to-wear, and streetwear brands presenting their spring collections and fall collections.

It is considered one of the "Big Five" global fashion weeks due to its frequent inclusion alongside the traditional "Big Four" weeks of New York, Paris, Milan, and London. This characterization is disputed by others who note that Tokyo's international influence lags its peers who make up the traditional Big Four. In recent years, promoting internationalization of Tokyo Fashion Week and Japan's fashion industry has been a key priority for industry leaders.

Tokyo Fashion Week is particularly known as the world's leading showcase for avant-garde and experimental fashion, as well as Tokyo streetwear. It is the largest fashion week in Asia.

Since 2019, Rakuten, Japanese technology conglomerate, has been the title sponsor branding the event as the Rakuten Fashion Week Tokyo. Prior title sponsors have included Amazon Fashion and Mercedes-Benz. The 2020 show was canceled as a result of the COVID-19 pandemic.
