= Francesco's Mediterranean Voyage =

Francesco's Mediterranean Voyage is a BBC Television documentary series first aired in 2008. It follows Venetian architect Francesco da Mosto as he follows the historical Venetian trading route from Venice through the Adriatic Sea, Corinth Canal, Aegean Sea and Dardanelles to Istanbul. This route was taken by, among others, his ancestor Alvise da Mosto. Travelling as a member of the crew of the Camper and Nicholsons ketch Black Swan, along the way he stops off at the ports that were visited by the earlier traders and were in many cases part of the Venetian Empire. The series was written by Da Mosto.

Eden broadcasts edited highlights of the episodes as repeats, seriously shortened to fit the same time slot as the BBC but with commercials replacing much of the content. When this happens the original programmes are removed from the BBC iPlayer. The series was broadcast on BBC Four in 2018.

Country	Place	Image	Country	Place	Image	Country	Place	Image
Episode 1			Episode 2			Episode 3		
Italy	Venice		Croatia	Pula		Bosnia and Herzegovina	Mostar	
Italy	Venice		Croatia	Church of Our Lady, Škriljinah		Bosnia and Herzegovina	Our Lady of Međugorje	
Italy	Venice		Croatia	Porer Lighthouse		Croatia	Hvar	
Italy	Venice		Croatia	Split		Croatia	Korčula	
Italy	Venice		Croatia	Split		Croatia	Dubrovnik	
Episode 4			Episode 5			Episode 6		
Montenegro	Madonna dello Scarpello		Greece	Corfu		Greece	Delphi	
Montenegro	Ulcinj		Greece	Ioannina		Greece	Corinth Canal	
Albania	Tirana		Greece	Meteora		Greece	Athens	
Episode 7			Episode 8			Episode 9		
Greece	Epidaurus		Greece	Delos				
Greece	Mystras		Greece	Tinos				
Greece	Mani Peninsula		Greece	Naxos				
Greece	Methoni		Greece	Santorini				
